= Gladys Akpa =

Nigerian footballer

Personal information
- Date of birth: 1 January 1986 (age 40)
- Position: Defender

Senior career*
Years	Team	Apps	(Gls)
- Sunshine Queens

International career^{‡}
- Nigeria
- * Club domestic league appearances and goals ‡ National team caps and goals as of 11 October 2014 (before the 2012 African Women's Championship)

Gladys Akpa (born 1 January 1986) is a Nigerian footballer who plays as a defender for the Nigeria women's national football team. She was part of the team at the 2010 African Women's Championship and 2012 African Women's Championship. At the club level, she played for Sunshine Queens in Nigeria. She played for Nigeria against Mali (20 November 2016), Ghana (23 November 2016), Kenya (26 November 2016), South Africa (29 November 2016) and Cameroon (3 December 2016).

== International career ==
Nigeria

- African Women's Championship Winner (2): 2010, 2016
- Consistent Call‑Ups: Continued national team involvement through 2016, included in the Super Falcons squad for the AWC qualifiers and final tournament under coach Florence Omagbemi

== Club career highlights ==
Sunshine Queens (NWPL): Played as a central/back defender. A notable moment came on May 11, 2015, when Akpa unintentionally scored an own goal in a 2–1 league match against Capital City Doves

== Participate in ==
2010 African Women's Championship

=== Group A ===
Pos	Team	Pld	W	D	L	GF	GA	GD	Pts	Qualification
1	Nigeria	3	3	0	0	10	1	+9	9	Advance to knockout stage
2	South Africa (H)	3	2	0	1	7	3	+4	6	Advance to knockout stage
3	Mali	3	1	0	2	3	11	−8	3	
4	Tanzania	3	0	0	3	3	8	−5	0	

Rules for classification: Group stage tiebreakers
(H) Hosts

All times are SAST (UTC+2)

31 October 2010
13:00

South Africa	2–1	Tanzania
Popela 35'; Mamello 87' (pen.)	Report	Chabruma 43'

Sinaba Stadium, Daveyton
Referee: Therese Neguel (Cameroon)
1 November 2010
15:30

Nigeria	5–0	Mali
Nkwocha 15', 16', 42'; Mbachu 70'; Ordega 84'	Report

Sinaba Stadium, Daveyton
Referee: Therese Sagno (Guinea)

4 November 2010
11:00

South Africa	1–2	Nigeria
van Wyk 44'	Report	Nkwocha 33', 39'

Sinaba Stadium, Daveyton
Referee: Fadouma Dia (Senegal)
4 November 2010
15:30

Mali	3–2	Tanzania
Konate 25'; Diarra 31'; N'Diaye 67'	Report	Mwasikili 30'; Swalehe 32'

Sinaba Stadium, Daveyton
Referee: Patricia Obone Obiang (Gabon)

7 November 2010
15:30

Mali	0–4	South Africa
	Report	Amanda 32', 76', 90'; Jermaine 84'

Sinaba Stadium, Daveyton
Referee: Fadouma Dia (Senegal)
7 November 2010
15:30

Tanzania	0–3	Nigeria
	Report	Nkwocha 12', 32'; Oparanozie 82'

Makhulong Stadium, Tembisa
Referee: Aissatta Ameyo Amegee (Togo)

== Knockout stage ==
=== Bracket ===
Semi-finals
11 November - Daveyton
Nigeria	5
Cameroon	1
11 November - Daveyton
Equatorial Guinea (a.e.t.)	3
South Africa	1

Final
14 November - Daveyton
Nigeria	4
Equatorial Guinea	2
Third place play-off
14 November - Daveyton
Cameroon	0
South Africa	2

=== Semi-finals ===
All times are SAST (UTC+2)

Winners qualified for 2011 FIFA Women's World Cup.

11 November 2010
10:30

Nigeria	5–1	Cameroon
Helen Ukaonu 33'; Oparanozie 45+1'; Nkwocha 58', 74', 81' (pen.)	Report	Ngock 47'

Sinaba Stadium, Daveyton
Referee: Therese Sagno (Guinea)

11 November 2010
15:30

Equatorial Guinea	3 – 1 (a.e.t.)	South Africa
S. Simporé 103', 120+5'; Jade 109'	Report	Dlamini 120+8'

Sinaba Stadium, Daveyton
Referee: Aisatta Ameyo Amegee (Togo)

=== Third place play-off ===
14 November 2010
10:00

Cameroon	0–2	South Africa
	Report	Skiti 8'; Dlamini 38'

Sinaba Stadium, Daveyton
Referee: Pamela Chiwaya (Zimbabwe)

=== Final ===
14 November 2010
14:00

Nigeria	4–2	Equatorial Guinea
Nkwocha 8'; Oparanozie 76'; Nke 77' (o.g.); Carol 84' (o.g.)	Report	Carol 62'; Jade 81'

Sinaba Stadium, Daveyton
Referee: Fadouma Dia (Senegal)

2012 African Women's Championship

=== Group B ===
Pos	Team	Pld	W	D	L	GF	GA	GD	Pts	Qualification
1	Nigeria	3	3	0	0	8	2	+6	9	Advance to knockout stage
2	Cameroon	3	1	1	1	5	3	+2	4	Advance to knockout stage
3	Ivory Coast	3	1	0	2	7	7	0	3	
4	Ethiopia	3	0	1	2	0	8	−8	1	

Rules for classification: Group stage tiebreakers
29 October 2012
14:30

Nigeria	2–1	Cameroon
Ohadugha 45+1'; Nkwocha 86'	Report	Manie 52' (pen.)

Nkoantoma Stadium, Bata
Referee: Gladys Lengwe (Zambia)
29 October 2012
17:30

Ivory Coast	5–0	Ethiopia
Nrehy 1', 9', 68'; Gnago 51'; N'Guessan 53'	Report

Nkoantoma Stadium, Bata
Referee: Kankou Coulibaly (Mali)

1 November 2012
14:30

Cameroon	4–1	Ivory Coast
Iven 11', 25'; Onguene 62'; Zouga 88'	Report	Nahi 18'

Nkoantoma Stadium, Bata
Referee: Neama Mohamed Rashad (Egypt)
1 November 2012
17:30

Ethiopia	0–3	Nigeria
	Report	Sunday 26'; Mbachu 64'; Nkwocha 66'

Nkoantoma Stadium, Bata
Referee: Maximina Bernardo (Angola)

4 November 2012
17:30

Nigeria	3–1	Ivory Coast
Chukwudi 9'; Ebere 39'; Mbachu 75'	Report	Nrehy 82'

Estadio de Malabo, Malabo
Referee: Insaf El Harkaoui (Morocco)
4 November 2012
17:30

Cameroon	0–0	Ethiopia

Nkoantoma Stadium, Bata
Referee: Aisha Nabikko Ssemambo (Uganda)

== Knockout stage ==
=== Bracket ===
Semi-finals
7 November – Malabo
Equatorial Guinea	2
Cameroon	0
7 November – Bata
Nigeria	0
South Africa	1

Final
11 November – Malabo
Equatorial Guinea	4
South Africa	0
Third place play-off
11 November – Malabo
Cameroon	1
Nigeria	0

=== Semi-finals ===
7 November 2012
14:30

Equatorial Guinea	2–0	Cameroon
Chinasa 7'; Añonman 40'	Report

Estadio de Malabo, Malabo
7 November 2012
17:30

Nigeria	0–1	South Africa
	Report	van Wyk 23'

Nkoantoma Stadium, Bata

=== Third place play-off ===
11 November 2012
14:30

Cameroon	1–0	Nigeria
Enganamouit 31'	Report

Estadio de Malabo, Malabo

=== Final ===
11 November 2012
17:30

Equatorial Guinea	4–0	South Africa
Chinasa 43', 72'; Tiga 66'; Añonman 70'	Report

Estadio de Malabo, Malabo
Attendance: 20 000
