= 2018 Women's Africa Cup of Nations =

Tournament details
- Host country: Ghana
- Dates: 17 November – 1 December
- Teams: 8
- Venues: 2 (in 2 host cities)

Final positions
- Champions: Nigeria (9th title)
- Runners-up: South Africa
- Third place: Cameroon
- Fourth place: Mali

Tournament statistics
- Matches played: 16
- Goals scored: 51 (3.19 per match)
- Top scorer: (South Africa) Thembi Kgatlana (5 goals)
- Best player: (South Africa) Thembi Kgatlana
- Fair play award: Cameroon

The 2018 Women's Africa Cup of Nations (officially known as the Total Women's Africa Cup Of Nations, Ghana 2018) was the 13th edition of the Africa Women Cup of Nations (formerly African Women's Championship), the biennial international football championship organised by the Confederation of African Football (CAF) for the women's national teams of Africa. The tournament was held in Ghana, from 17 November to 1 December 2018.

The tournament also doubled as the African qualifiers to the 2019 FIFA Women's World Cup. The top three teams qualified for the World Cup in France.

Nigeria, the two-time defending champions, won the tournament for their third consecutive and a record-extending 9th overall Africa Women Cup of Nations title.

== Sponsorship ==
In July 2016, Total secured an eight-year sponsorship package from the Confederation of African Football (CAF) to support 10 of its principal competitions. Due to this sponsorship, the 2018 Women's Africa Cup of Nations was named "2018 Total Women's Africa Cup of Nations".

== Host selection ==
There were no other associations bidding to host the event other than Ghana. Ghana was de facto awarded the hosting rights on 27 September 2016 and officially in mid December. It is the first time they hosted the women's event.

Following media reports in mid-2018 that Ghana may be stripped of the hosting rights, this topic was discussed at the meeting of the Organising Committee for Women's Football on 12 September, and a final decision not to replace Ghana as host was taken by the CAF Executive Committee at its meeting on 27–28 September, though the Secretariat would continue to closely monitor preparations.

== Mascot ==
The mascot for the 11th Edition of Total Women's African Cup of Nations is called Agrohemaa and it is represented by an eagle. The reason why the eagle is used for the tournament is because of its courage, strength, focus and immortality.

== Qualification ==
Ghana qualified automatically as hosts, while the remaining seven spots were determined by the qualifying rounds played in April and June 2018.

Equatorial Guinea were initially banned from the 2018 Africa Women Cup of Nations, but were reinstated after the ban was lifted in July 2017 at an emergency CAF committee meeting, and were included in the qualifying draw. However, FIFA banned them from qualifying for the 2019 FIFA Women's World Cup, meaning they could not qualify for the World Cup regardless of their performance in the Africa Women Cup of Nations.

=== Qualified teams ===
The following eight teams qualified for the final tournament. Initially, Kenya replaced Equatorial Guinea after they were disqualified by the CAF for fielding an ineligible player, but the decision was overturned on appeal, and Equatorial Guinea were reintegrated into the competition. Kenya appealed to the Court of Arbitration for Sport, but failed to overturn the decision.

| Team | Appearance | Previous best performance | FIFA ranking at start of event |
|---|---|---|---|
| Ghana (hosts) | 12th | Runners-up (1998, 2002, 2006) | 47 |
| Algeria | 5th | Group stage (2004) | 80 |
| Cameroon | 13th | Runners-up (1991, 2004, 2014, 2016) | 49 |
| Equatorial Guinea | 5th | Champions (2008, 2012) | 54 |
| Mali | 7th | Group stage (2006, 2016) | 89 |
| Nigeria | 13th | Champions (1991, 1995, 1998, 2000, 2002, 2004, 2006, 2010, 2014, 2016) | 38 |
| South Africa | 12th | Runners-up (1995, 2000, 2008, 2012) | 50 |
| Zambia | 3rd | Quarter-finals (1995) | 116 |

== Venues ==
The tournament was held in Accra and Cape Coast.

| Accra | 2018 Women's Africa Cup of Nations is located in Ghana | Cape Coast |
| Accra Sports Stadium | 2018 Women's Africa Cup of Nations is located in Ghana | Cape Coast Sports Stadium |
| Capacity: 40,000 | 2018 Women's Africa Cup of Nations is located in Ghana | Capacity: 15,000 |

== Squads ==
Each squad can contain a maximum of 21 players (Regulations Article 69).

== Match officials ==
A total of 16 referees and 16 assistant referees were appointed for the tournament.

Referees

- (Burundi) Suavis Iratunga
- (Eswatini) Letticia Viana
- (Ethiopia) Lidya Tafesse
- (Mauritius) Maria Rivet
- (Morocco) Bouchra Karboubi
- (Nigeria) Patience Madu Ndidi
- (Rwanda) Salima Mukansanga
- (Senegal) Fatou Thioune
- (Tanzania) Jonesia Kabakama
- (Togo) Vincentia Amedome
- (Tunisia) Dorsaf Ganouati
- (Zambia) Gladys Lengwe

Assistant referees

- (Ivory Coast) Kassonoux Denis
- (Cameroon) Josiane Nfongan
- (Democratic Republic of the Congo) Kanjinga Mujanayi
- (Egypt) Mona Atallah
- (Kenya) Mary Njoroge
- (Madagascar) Lidwine Rakotozafinoro
- (Malawi) Bernadettar Kwimbira
- (Mali) Fanta Kone
- (Mauritius) Queency Victoire
- (Morocco) Fatiha Jermoumi
- (Nigeria) Mimisen Iyorhe
- (Senegal) Adia Cisse
- (Zambia) Diana Chikotesha

== Draw ==
The draw for the final tournament was held on 21 October 2018, 19:00 GMT (UTC±0), at the Mövenpick Ambassador Hotel in Accra. The eight teams were drawn into two groups of four teams. The hosts Ghana were seeded in Group A and allocated to position A1, and the holders Nigeria were seeded in Group B and allocated to position B1. The remaining six teams were seeded based on their results in the last three editions of the Africa Women Cup of Nations, and drawn to any of the remaining three positions in each group.

| Seeds | Pot 1 | Pot 2 |
|---|---|---|
| Ghana (hosts); Nigeria (holders) | Cameroon; South Africa | Kenya; Mali; Algeria; Zambia |

Note: Kenya were initially included in the draw, but Equatorial Guinea were reinstated to the competition afterwards.

== Group stage ==
The top two teams of each group advance to the semi-finals.

Tiebreakers

Teams are ranked according to points (3 points for a win, 1 point for a draw, 0 points for a loss), and if tied on points, the following tiebreaking criteria are applied, in the order given, to determine the rankings (Regulations Article 71):

1. Points in head-to-head matches among tied teams;
2. Goal difference in head-to-head matches among tied teams;
3. Goals scored in head-to-head matches among tied teams;
4. If more than two teams are tied, and after applying all head-to-head criteria above, a subset of teams are still tied, all head-to-head criteria above are reapplied exclusively to this subset of teams;
5. Goal difference in all group matches;
6. Goals scored in all group matches;
7. Drawing of lots.

All times are local, GMT (UTC±0).

=== Group A ===
| Pos | Team | Pld | W | D | L | GF | GA | GD | Pts | Qualification |
|---|---|---|---|---|---|---|---|---|---|---|
| 1 | Cameroon | 3 | 2 | 1 | 0 | 6 | 2 | +4 | 7 | Knockout stage |
| 2 | Mali | 3 | 2 | 0 | 1 | 6 | 5 | +1 | 6 | Knockout stage |
| 3 | Ghana (H) | 3 | 1 | 1 | 1 | 3 | 3 | 0 | 4 | |
| 4 | Algeria | 3 | 0 | 0 | 3 | 2 | 7 | −5 | 0 | |

Source: CAF
Rules for classification: Group stage tiebreakers
(H) Hosts
17 November 2018
15:30

| Ghana | 1–0 | Algeria |
|---|---|---|
| Amfobea 13' | Report |

Accra Sports Stadium, Accra
Referee: Lidya Tafesse (Ethiopia)
17 November 2018
18:30

| Mali | 1–2 | Cameroon |
|---|---|---|
| A. Traoré 56' | Report | Meffometou 71'; Nchout 73' |

Accra Sports Stadium, Accra
Referee: Jonesia Rukyaa Kabakama (Tanzania)

20 November 2018
15:30

| Ghana | 1–2 | Mali |
|---|---|---|
| Addo 71' (pen.) | Report | Touré 24' (pen.), 75' |

Accra Sports Stadium, Accra
Referee: Letticia Antonella Viana (Eswatini)
20 November 2018
18:30

| Cameroon | 3–0 | Algeria |
|---|---|---|
| Onguéné 13'; Enganamouit 54'; Nchout 60' | Report |

Accra Sports Stadium, Accra
Referee: Fatou Thioune (Senegal)

23 November 2018
16:00

| Cameroon | 1–1 | Ghana |
|---|---|---|
| Manie 41' (pen.) | Report | Boakye 31' |

Accra Sports Stadium, Accra
Referee: Maria Rivet (Mauritius)
23 November 2018
16:00

| Algeria | 2–3 | Mali |
|---|---|---|
| Belkacemi 37'; Merrouche 63' (pen.) | Report | F. Diarra 58', 90+4' (pen.); Diadhiou 83' |

Cape Coast Sports Stadium, Cape Coast
Referee: Patience Madu Ndidi (Nigeria)

=== Group B ===
| Pos | Team | Pld | W | D | L | GF | GA | GD | Pts | Qualification |
|---|---|---|---|---|---|---|---|---|---|---|
| 1 | South Africa | 3 | 2 | 1 | 0 | 9 | 2 | +7 | 7 | Knockout stage |
| 2 | Nigeria | 3 | 2 | 0 | 1 | 10 | 1 | +9 | 6 | Knockout stage |
| 3 | Zambia | 3 | 1 | 1 | 1 | 6 | 5 | +1 | 4 | |
| 4 | Equatorial Guinea | 3 | 0 | 0 | 3 | 1 | 18 | −17 | 0 | |

Source: CAF
Rules for classification: Group stage tiebreakers
18 November 2018
15:30

| Nigeria | 0–1 | South Africa |
|---|---|---|
| | Report | Kgatlana 85' |

Cape Coast Sports Stadium, Cape Coast
Referee: Gladys Lengwe (Zambia)
18 November 2018
18:30

| Zambia | 5–0 | Equatorial Guinea |
|---|---|---|
| G. Chanda 7'; Lungu 43'; Kundananji 57', 87'; Mwakapila 66' (pen.) | Report |

Cape Coast Sports Stadium, Cape Coast
Referee: Bouchra Karboubi (Morocco)

21 November 2018
15:30

| Nigeria | 4–0 | Zambia |
|---|---|---|
| Oparanozie 41'; Ordega 69'; Ajibade 75'; Okoronkwo 90+4' | Report |

Cape Coast Sports Stadium, Cape Coast
Referee: Suavis Iratunga (Burundi)
21 November 2018
18:30

| Equatorial Guinea | 1–7 | South Africa |
|---|---|---|
| E. Obono 45+1' | Report | Motlhalo 19' (pen.); Nyandeni 21'; Jane 56'; Kgatlana 60', 63'; Mthandi 76'; Seoposenwe 79' |

Cape Coast Sports Stadium, Cape Coast
Referee: Dorsaf Ganouati (Tunisia)

24 November 2018
16:00

| Equatorial Guinea | 0–6 | Nigeria |
|---|---|---|
| | Report | Ordega 10'; Oshoala 13', 22', 33'; Oparanozie 48'; Chikwelu 63' |

Cape Coast Sports Stadium, Cape Coast
Referee: Vincentia Enyonam Amedome (Togo)
24 November 2018
16:00

| South Africa | 1–1 | Zambia |
|---|---|---|
| Kgatlana 8' | Report | Kundananji 10' |

Accra Sports Stadium, Accra
Referee: Carolyne Wanjala (Kenya)

== Knockout stage ==
In the knockout stage, extra time and a penalty shoot-out were used to decide the winner if necessary, except for the third place match, where a penalty shoot-out (no extra time) was used to decide the winner if necessary (Regulations Article 72).

=== Bracket ===
Semi-finals
27 November – Accra
Cameroon | 0 (2)
Nigeria (p) | 0 (4)
27 November – Cape Coast
South Africa | 2
Mali | 0

Final
1 December – Accra
Nigeria (p) | 0 (4)
South Africa | 0 (3)
Third place match
30 November – Cape Coast
Cameroon | 4
Mali | 2

=== Semi-finals ===
The semi-final winners qualified for the 2019 FIFA Women's World Cup.

27 November 2018
15:30

| Cameroon | 0–0 (a.e.t.) | Nigeria |
|---|---|---|
| | Report |
Penalties
| Nchout (penalty scored); Feudjio (penalty scored); Enganamouit (penalty missed); Ngo Mbeleck (penalty missed) | 2–4 | (penalty scored) Ebi; (penalty scored) Ajibade; (penalty scored) Oshoala; (penalty scored) Ebere |

Accra Sports Stadium, Accra
Referee: Lidya Tafesse (Ethiopia)

27 November 2018
18:30

| South Africa | 2–0 | Mali |
|---|---|---|
| Kgatlana 31'; Ramalepe 81' | Report |

Cape Coast Sports Stadium, Cape Coast
Referee: Jonesia Rukyaa Kabakama (Tanzania)

=== Third place match ===
The third place team qualified for the 2019 FIFA Women's World Cup.

30 November 2018
16:00

| Cameroon | 4–2 | Mali |
|---|---|---|
| Abena 32', 40'; Onguéné 62'; Manie 90+2' | Report | F. Diarra 44'; Awona 56' (o.g.) |

Cape Coast Sports Stadium, Cape Coast
Referee: Maria Rivet (Mauritius)

=== Final ===
1 December 2018
16:00

| Nigeria | 0–0 (a.e.t.) | South Africa |
|---|---|---|
| | Report |
Penalties
| Ebi (penalty missed); Ebere (penalty scored); Chikwelu (penalty scored); Ihezuo (penalty scored); Uchendu (penalty scored) | 4–3 | (penalty scored) Matlou; (penalty missed) Ramalepe; (penalty scored) Nyandeni; (penalty scored) Makhabane; (penalty missed) Motlhalo |

Accra Sports Stadium, Accra
Referee: Gladys Lengwe (Zambia)

== Goalscorers ==
There were 51 goals scored in 16 matches, for an average of 3.19 goals per match.

5 goals

- (South Africa) Thembi Kgatlana

3 goals

- (Mali) Fatoumata Diarra
- (Nigeria) Asisat Oshoala
- (Zambia) Racheal Kundananji

2 goals

- (Cameroon) Ninon Abena
- (Cameroon) Christine Manie
- (Cameroon) Ajara Nchout
- (Cameroon) Gabrielle Onguéné
- (Mali) Bassira Touré
- (Nigeria) Desire Oparanozie
- (Nigeria) Francisca Ordega

1 goal

- (Algeria) Lydia Belkacemi
- (Algeria) Imene Merrouche
- (Cameroon) Gaëlle Enganamouit
- (Cameroon) Claudine Meffometou
- (Equatorial Guinea) Elena Obono
- (Ghana) Elizabeth Addo
- (Ghana) Gladys Amfobea
- (Ghana) Portia Boakye
- (Mali) Aïssatou Diadhiou
- (Mali) Aissata Traoré
- (Nigeria) Rasheedat Ajibade
- (Nigeria) Rita Chikwelu
- (Nigeria) Amarachi Okoronkwo
- (South Africa) Refiloe Jane
- (South Africa) Linda Motlhalo
- (South Africa) Amanda Mthandi
- (South Africa) Mpumi Nyandeni
- (South Africa) Lebogang Ramalepe
- (South Africa) Jermaine Seoposenwe
- (Zambia) Grace Chanda
- (Zambia) Ireen Lungu
- (Zambia) Mary Mwakapila

1 own goal

- (Cameroon) Aurelle Awona (against Mali)

== Awards ==
The following awards were given at the conclusion of the tournament:

| Award | Winner |
|---|---|
| Best player | (South Africa) Thembi Kgatlana |
| Top scorer | (South Africa) Thembi Kgatlana |
| Fair Play | Cameroon |

Team of the Tournament
| Goalkeeper | Defenders | Midfielders | Forwards | Substitutes |
|---|---|---|---|---|
| (Nigeria) Tochukwu Oluehi | (South Africa) Lebogang Ramalepe (South Africa) Janine van Wyk (Nigeria) Onome Ebi (Cameroon) Claudine Meffometou | (Cameroon) Raissa Feudjio (Cameroon) Marlyse Ngo Ndoumbouk (Ghana) Elizabeth Addo | (Cameroon) Gabrielle Onguéné (South Africa) Thembi Kgatlana (Mali) Bassira Touré | (South Africa) Kaylin Swart (Nigeria) Asisat Oshoala (South Africa) Linda Motlhalo (Cameroon) Genevieve Ngo Mbeleck (Nigeria) Francisca Ordega (Mali) Fatoumata Diarra |

== Qualified teams for FIFA Women's World Cup ==
The following three teams from CAF qualified for the 2019 FIFA Women's World Cup.

| Team | Qualified on | Previous appearances in FIFA Women's World Cup^{1} |
|---|---|---|
| Nigeria | 27 November 2018 | 7 (1991, 1995, 1999, 2003, 2007, 2011, 2015) |
| South Africa | 27 November 2018 | 0 (debut) |
| Cameroon | 30 November 2018 | 1 (2015) |

^{1} Bold indicates champions for that year. Italic indicates hosts for that year.
