= Jermaine Seoposenwe =

South African soccer player (born 1993)

Personal information
- Date of birth: 12 October 1993 (age 33)
- Place of birth: Cape Town, South Africa
- Height: 1.67 m (5 ft 6 in)
- Position: Forward

Team information
- Current team: Monterrey
- Number: 12

Youth career
- Santos Ladies FC

College career
Years	Team	Apps	(Gls)
2014–2017	Samford	80	(39)

Senior career*
Years	Team	Apps	(Gls)
2018–2019	UWC Ladies		
2019	Gintra Universitetas	1	(3)
2020	Betis	2	(0)
2020–2022	Braga	38	(10)
2022–2023	Juárez	24	(7)
2023–	Monterrey	78	(22)

International career^{‡}
2010–2025	South Africa	112	(25)
Medal record
Representing South Africa
Women's Africa Cup of Nations
First place	2022 Morocco
Second place	2012 Equatorial Guinea
Second place	2018 Ghana
Third place	2010 South Africa
- * Club domestic league appearances and goals ‡ National team caps and goals as of 10 August 2025 (post the 2024 Women's Africa Cup of Nations)

Jermaine Seoposenwe (born 12 October 1993) is a South African soccer player who plays as a forward for Mexican Liga MX Femenil club Monterrey. She previously played for the South Africa national team.

== Club career ==
=== Gintra Universitetas ===
On 16 April 2019, it was announced that Seoposenwe had signed her first professional contract with Gintra Universitetas in Lithuania, joining them to play in the 2019-20 UEFA Women's Champions League season. She joined alongside South Africa teammate Nothando Vilakazi.

Seoposenwe made two Champions League appearances for Gintra, besides helping the side win the 2019 A Lyga Women and Amber Cup titles.

=== Real Betis ===
Seoposenwe signed for Spanish side Real Betis Balompie on 8 February 2020, making her debut in a 2–1 victory over RC Espanyol the following weekend.

The season would be called to an end early due to the COVID-19 global pandemic with Seoposenwe having made three appearances across all competitions.

=== SC Braga ===
On 6 July 2020, Seoposenwe was announced as a new player of SC Braga. She made an immediate impact at the club in her first campaign, scoring twice on 13 January 2021 against rivals SL Benfica in the final of the Taça de Portugal in a 3–1 victory.

In her second season at the club Seoposenwe scored 8 goals and provided 7 assists in 19 league appearances as the club finished third in the Campeonato Nacional. On 23 March 2022, SC Braga won the Taca da Liga on penalties against SL Benfica with Seoposenwe playing the entire 120 minutes.

=== FC Juarez ===
On 24 August 2022, Seoposenwe signed for Liga MX Femenil side FC Juarez on a free transfer. She revealed shortly after that she had previously agreed a pre-contract with French side FC Girondins de Bordeaux only for the relegation of the club's men's side to cause a change of direction.

Just a month after joining she set a new league record for fastest goal in a match, scoring after nine seconds in a 3-0 win over Necaxa.

In total she scored seven goals in 24 appearances for the club, helping Juarez reach the league's playoffs for the first time in their history during the 2023 Clausura.

=== C.F. Monterrey ===
Following the end of her Juarez contract, Seoposenwe moved to fellow Liga MX side C.F. Monterrey. On 28 May 2024 she scored in a 2-1 victory over Club America as her side were crowned 2024 Clausura champions.

On 26 November 2024, she helped her side to a second consecutive league title winning the 2024 Apertura in a penalty shootout against rivals Tigres UANL.

== International career ==
On 18 October 2015, Seoposenwe scored the winning goal against Equatorial Guinea which secured South Africa's qualification to the 2016 Summer Olympics in Rio de Janeiro. At the tournament she started all three of South Africa's matches as they exited at the Group Stage.

Seoposenwe was a key player for South Africa at the 2018 CAF Africa Women Cup of Nations with Banyana Banyana reaching the final only to lose to Nigeria in a penalty shootout. The result qualified South Africa for the 2019 FIFA Women's World Cup for their first appearance at the competition, with Seoposenwe part of the 23 player squad for the tournament in France. At the competition, she featured in matches with China and Spain.

On 4 July 2022, Seoposenwe scored Banyana Banyana's first goal in their 2–1 win against Nigeria at the 2022 Africa Women Cup of Nations.

In 2025 she announced her retirement after the 2024 Women's Africa Cup of Nations. She scored her 24th and last goal for the national team against Ghana. She retired having amassed 112 caps.

=== International goals ===
Scores and results list South Africa's goal tally first

No.	Date	Venue	Opponent	Score	Result	Competition
1	7 November 2010	Sinaba Stadium, Daveyton, South Africa	Mali	3–0	4–0	2010 African Women's Championship
2	11 March 2013	Tasos Markou, Paralimni, Cyprus	Northern Ireland	2–0	2–1	2013 Cyprus Women's Cup
3	6 March 2015	Paralimni Stadium, Paralimni, Cyprus	Belgium	1–0	1–0	2015 Cyprus Women's Cup
4	11 March 2015	GSP Stadium, Nicosia, Cyprus	Finland	1–2	1–2	2015 Cyprus Women's Cup
5	23 May 2015	Stade Augustin Monédan de Sibang, Libreville, Gabon	Gabon	1–1	3–2	2015 CAF Women's Olympic Qualifying Tournament
6	23 May 2015	Stade Augustin Monédan de Sibang, Libreville, Gabon	Gabon	2–1	3–2	2015 CAF Women's Olympic Qualifying Tournament
7	31 May 2015	Dobsonville Stadium, Johannesburg, South Africa	Gabon	1–0	5–0	2015 CAF Women's Olympic Qualifying Tournament
8	31 May 2015	Dobsonville Stadium, Johannesburg, South Africa	Gabon	4–0	5–0	2015 CAF Women's Olympic Qualifying Tournament
9	18 October 2015	Estadio de Bata, Bata, Equatorial Guinea	Equatorial Guinea	1–0	1–0	2015 CAF Women's Olympic Qualifying Tournament
10	28 July 2016	Estádio Luso Brasileiro, Rio de Janeiro, Brazil	New Zealand	1–3	1–4	Friendly
11	25 November 2016	Limbe Stadium, Limbe, Cameroon	Egypt	4–0	5–0	2016 Women's Africa Cup of Nations
12	6 June 2018	Setsoto Stadium, Maseru, Lesotho	Lesotho	1–0	1–0	2018 Women's Africa Cup of Nations qualification
13	10 June 2018	Dr. Petrus Molemela Stadium, Bloemfontein, South Africa	Lesotho	1–0	6–0	2018 Women's Africa Cup of Nations qualification
14	10 June 2018	Dr. Petrus Molemela Stadium, Bloemfontein, South Africa	Lesotho	4–0	6–0	2018 Women's Africa Cup of Nations qualification
15	10 June 2018	Dr. Petrus Molemela Stadium, Bloemfontein, South Africa	Lesotho	6–0	6–0	2018 Women's Africa Cup of Nations qualification
16	21 November 2018	Cape Coast Sports Stadium, Cape Coast, Ghana	Equatorial Guinea	7–1	7–1	2018 Africa Women Cup of Nations
17	4 July 2022	Stade Moulay Hassan, Rabat, Morocco	Nigeria	1–0	2–1	2022 Women's Africa Cup of Nations
18	14 July 2022	Stade Moulay Hassan, Rabat, Morocco	Tunisia	1–0	1–0	2022 Women's Africa Cup of Nations
19	18 February 2023	Gold City Sports Complex, Alanya, Turkey	Uzbekistan	1–0	3–0	2023 Turkish Women's Cup
20	10 April 2023	Serbian FA Sports Center, Stara Pazova, Serbia	Serbia	2–3	2–3	Friendly
21	23 February 2024	Chamazi Stadium, Dar es Salaam, Tanzania	Tanzania	1–0	3–0	2024 CAF Women's Olympic Qualifying Tournament
22	28 May 2025	Lucas Moripe Stadium, Pretoria, South Africa	Botswana	2–0	3–2	Friendly
23	28 May 2025	Lucas Moripe Stadium, Pretoria, South Africa	Botswana	3–0	3–2	Friendly
24	3 June 2025	Lucas Moripe Stadium, Pretoria, South Africa	Zambia	2–0	2–0	Friendly
25	7 July 2025	Honneur Stadium, Oujda, Morocco	Ghana	2–0	2–0	2024 Women's Africa Cup of Nations

== Honours ==
Gintra Universitetas

- A Lyga: 2019

SC Braga

- Taca de Portugal: 2019–20
- Taca da Liga: 2021–22

Monterrey

- Liga MX Femenil: 2024 Clausura, 2024 Apertura

South Africa

- Women's Africa Cup of Nations: 2022, runner-up: 2012, 2018

Individual

- Women's Africa Cup of Nations Team of the Tournament: 2022
- IFFHS CAF Women's Team of The Year: 2022
