= Amanda Dlamini =

South African soccer player and commentator (born 1988)

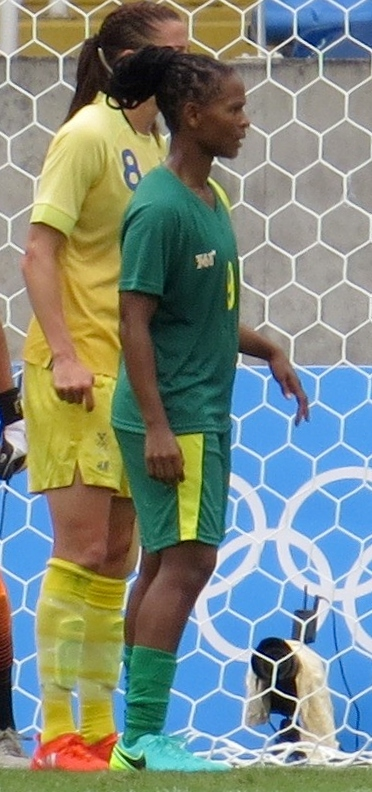
- Amanda Dlamini playing for South Africa at the 2016 Olympics

Personal information
- Full name: Amanda Sinegugu Dlamini
- Date of birth: 22 July 1988 (age 38)
- Place of birth: Harding, KwaZulu-Natal, South Africa
- Height: 1.64 m (5 ft 5 in)
- Position: Midfielder

Youth career
- –: Young Callies

Senior career*
Years	Team	Apps	(Gls)
–	Durban Ladies		
2013	University of Johannesburg		
–2019	JVW		

International career
2007–2018	South Africa	105	(24)
- * Club domestic league appearances and goals as of 15 September 2016

Amanda Sinegugu Dlamini (born 22 July 1988) is a former South African soccer player who is currently a soccer analyst and football administrator. She represented the South Africa women's national team at the 2012 (as the captain) and 2016 Summer Olympics.

Dlamini won her maiden national title with JVW in 2019. In 2024 she became the first woman to commentate a match at the Africa Cup of Nations when she commentated on the Morocco vs Tanzania match. She was appointed a CAF ambassador in October 2025.

== Early career ==
Dlamini was born in Harding in KwaZulu Natal. She started playing soccer in 1999 for a boys' team, Young Callies.

== Club career ==
At a club level, Dlamini has played for Durban Ladies and the UJ Ladies. She was part of the UJ Ladies team that won the inaugural Varsity Women's Football Cup in 2013 with Dlamini scoring from aset piece in a 6–0 win against TUT Ladies.

Dlamini played for JVW FC and was part of the team that won the 2019 Sasol League Championship.

== International career ==
She made her debut for the senior national team in 2007 in a 5–0 loss to Nigeria in an Olympic qualifier. She scored her first international goal against Netherlands. She was the top goalscorer of the 2008 Sasol Women's League. She was part of the squads that won bronze and silver medals at the 2010 African Women's Championship and 2012 African Women's Championship; at the 2010 championships, she was named Most Valuable Player. She was captain of the national team between 2011 and 2013.

She became the fifth female football player to win 100 caps for South Africa following a friendly match against the United States in July 2016, following Janine van Wyk, Nompumelelo Nyandeni, Portia Modise and Noko Matlou. Prior to the game, she said "It has always been a dream of mine to play for the national team, I have never wanted to do anything else but play football. I am what I am today because of the game. I have given so much to the game and to see myself so close to the 100 caps makes me very emotional". In the same match, American goalkeeper Hope Solo won her 100th cap for the United States.

She retired from international football in January 2018.

=== International goals ===
No.	Date	Venue	Opponent	Score	Result	Competition
1.	10 August 2008	Caledonian Stadium, Pretoria, South Africa	Netherlands	1–1	1–2	Friendly
2.	11 November 2010	Sinaba Stadium, Daveyton, South Africa	Equatorial Guinea	1–3	1–3	2010 African Women's Championship
3.	14 November 2010	Sinaba Stadium, Daveyton, South Africa	Cameroon	2–0	2–0	2010 African Women's Championship
4.	3 July 2011	Gwanzura, Harare, Zimbabwe	Botswana	1–0	4–0	2011 COSAFA Women's Championship
5.	6 July 2011	Gwanzura, Harare, Zimbabwe	Malawi	2–1	5–1	2011 COSAFA Women's Championship
6.	6 July 2011	Gwanzura, Harare, Zimbabwe	Malawi	3–1	5–1	2011 COSAFA Women's Championship
7.	28 February 2012	Dasaki Stadium, Achna, Cyprus	South Korea	1–0	1–2	2012 Cyprus Women's Cup
8.	18 October 2014	Independence Stadium, Windhoek, Namibia	Algeria	1–0	5–1	2014 African Women's Championship
9.	11 April 2015	Dobsonville Stadium, Johannesburg, South Africa	Botswana	3–0	5–0	2015 African Games qualification
10.	31 May 2015	Dobsonville Stadium, Johannesburg, South Africa	Gabon	2–0	5–0	2015 CAF Women's Olympic qualifying tournament

== Personal life ==
In 2012, she founded the Amanda Dlamini Girls Foundation aiming to provide basic help to girls in rural areas.

== Outside Football ==
Media

She is currently a soccer analyst at South African sports broadcaster Supersport. In 2024 she became the first woman to commentate a match at the Africa Cup of Nations. Her first match being the Morocco vs Tanzania match at the 2023 Africa Cup of Nations.

In October 2015 she was appointed a CAF ambassador and commentator for the CAF African Schools Football Championship.

Administration

In July 2021, she was appointed as the Senior Commercial and Marketing Manager of the South African Football Association (SAFA)

== Honours ==
South Africa

- African Women's Championship runners up: 2012 third place: 2010

University of Johannesburg

- Women's Varsity Football: 2013

JVW

- Sasol League National Championship: 2019
