= Desire Oparanozie =

Nigerian footballer

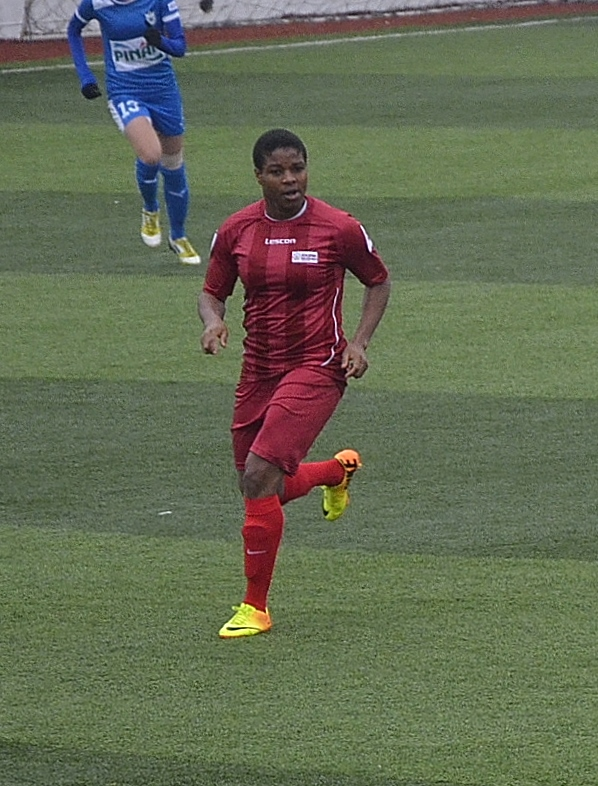
- Oparanozie playing for Ataşehir Belediyespor in the 2013–14 season

Personal information
- Full name: Ugochi Desire Oparanozie
- Date of birth: 17 December 1993 (age 32)
- Place of birth: Owerri, Nigeria
- Height: 1.65 m (5 ft 5 in)
- Position: Forward

Senior career*
| Years | Team | Apps | (Gls) |
| ??–2010 | Bayelsa Queens F.C. | | |
| 2010–2012 | Delta Queens F.C. | | |
| 2011 | → Lüleburgaz 39 Spor (loan) | | |
| 2012–2013 | Rossiyanka | 11 | (2) |
| 2013–2014 | Wolfsburg | 1 | (0) |
| 2014 | Ataşehir Belediyespor | 7 | (6) |
| 2014–2020 | Guingamp | 106 | (45) |
| 2020–2022 | Dijon | 25 | (7) |
| 2022–2023 | Wuhan Jianghan University | 0 | (0) |

International career^{‡}
| 2010–2023 | Nigeria | 49 | (33) |
- * Club domestic league appearances and goals as of 24 January 2021 ‡ National team caps and goals as of 31 August 2023

Ugochi Desire Oparanozie // (born 17 December 1993) is a former Nigerian footballer who played as a forward and the Nigerian national team.

== Club career ==
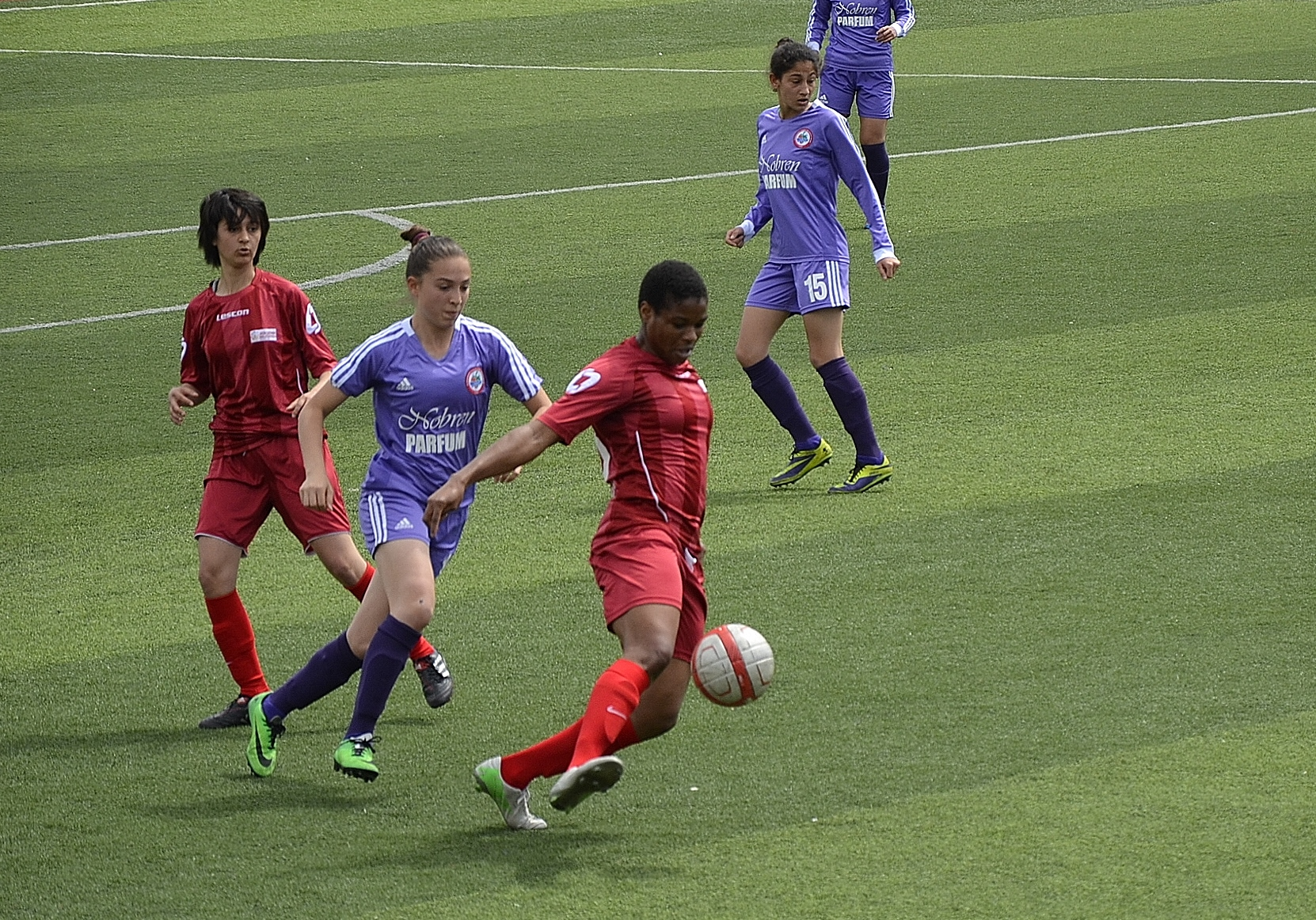
Oparanozie playing for Ataşehir Belediyespor in a home match against Kdz. Ereğlispor (2013–14)

Oparanozie started her career at Bayelsa Queens in the Nigerian Women's Championship and moved to Delta Queens in 2010. She then spent 2 months on loan at Düvenciler Lisesispor in the Turkish Women's First Football League in 2011, before returning to Delta Queens.

In 2012, she joined Rossiyanka from the Russian Women's Football Championship, playing four matches for them in the 2012–13 UEFA Women's Champions League, scoring one goal.

Oparanozie joined Bundesliga club VfL Wolfsburg for the 2013–14 season, signing a two-year contract. In the first half of the season, she only appeared in one game, and mostly played for Wolfsburg's second team. In the winter, after half a season, she left Wolfsburg. On 21 February 2014, Oparanozie transferred to Ataşehir Belediyespor to play the second half of the season in the Turkish Women's First Football League.

=== Guingamp ===
For the 2014–15 she joined Guingamp of the French Division 1 Féminine, where she was joined by Nigerian international captain Evelyn Nwabuoku during the following season.

Ahead of the 2019–20 season, Oparanozie was named club captain and began her leadership reign well with a win over Metz on the opening day of the season.

On 30 June 2020, Dijon FCO announced that She had signed a 2-year contract.

After leaving Guingamp, a bus-stop has been named after Oparanozie in Guingamp by her fans after her long stay at the French football club.

=== Wuhan Jianghan University ===
Oparanozie joined Chinese Women's Super League club Wuhan Jianghan University for the 2022 season.

== International career ==
As a junior international she scored 2 goals in the 2010 FIFA U-20 Women's World Cup and 3 goals in the 2012 tournament.

Oparanozie has been a regular member of the Nigerian national team since 2010, participating in the FIFA Women's World Cup tournaments of 2011, 2015, and 2019.

In April 2019, she was named captain of Nigeria by coach Thomas Dennerby who praised Oparanozie for her 'discipline and good character'.

Following the 2019 FIFA Women's World Cup, in her role as captain, she led calls for equal pay in Nigerian football, citing disparity with the bonuses received by the team's male counterparts.

She has also been part of the Nigerian squads of the African Women's Championship of 2010, 2014, 2016 and 2018, winning all four tournaments. She scored crucial goals in both the 2014 and 2016 finals.

On 16 June 2023, she was included in the 23-player Nigerian squad for the FIFA Women's World Cup 2023.

== International goals ==
| No. | Date | Venue | Opponent | Score | Result | Competition |
|---|---|---|---|---|---|---|
| 1. | 7 October 2010 | Makhulong Stadium, Tembisa, South Africa | Tanzania | 3–0 | 3–0 | 2010 African Women's Championship |
| 2. | 11 November 2010 | Sinaba Stadium, Daveyton, South Africa | Cameroon | 2–0 | 5–1 | 2010 African Women's Championship |
| 3. | 14 November 2010 | Sinaba Stadium, Daveyton, South Africa | Equatorial Guinea | 2–1 | 4–2 | 2010 African Women's Championship |
| 4. | 4 April 2011 | National Stadium, Abuja | Namibia | 3−0 | 7−0 | 2012 CAF Women's Olympic qualifying tournament |
| 5. | 4 April 2011 | National Stadium, Abuja | Namibia | 5−0 | 7−0 | 2012 CAF Women's Olympic qualifying tournament |
| 6. | 16 June 2012 | Teslim Balogun Stadium, Lagos, Nigeria | Zimbabwe | 2–0 | 4–0 | 2012 African Women's Championship qualification |
| 7. | 24 May 2014 | Stade Régional Nyamirambo, Kigali, Rwanda | Rwanda | 4–1 | 4–1 | 2014 African Women's Championship qualification |
| 8. | 7 June 2014 | Abuja Stadium, Abuja, Nigeria | Rwanda | 3–0 | 8–0 | 2014 African Women's Championship qualification |
| 9. | 7 June 2014 | Abuja Stadium, Abuja, Nigeria | Rwanda | 4–0 | 8–0 | 2014 African Women's Championship qualification |
| 10. | 7 June 2014 | Abuja Stadium, Abuja, Nigeria | Rwanda | 6–0 | 8–0 | 2014 African Women's Championship qualification |
| 11. | 11 October 2014 | Sam Nujoma Stadium, Windhoek, Namibia | Ivory Coast | 3–1 | 4–2 | 2014 African Women's Championship |
| 12. | 11 October 2014 | Sam Nujoma Stadium, Windhoek, Namibia | Ivory Coast | 4–2 | 4–2 | 2014 African Women's Championship |
| 13. | 14 October 2014 | Sam Nujoma Stadium, Windhoek, Namibia | Zambia | 3–0 | 6–0 | 2014 African Women's Championship |
| 14. | 14 October 2014 | Sam Nujoma Stadium, Windhoek, Namibia | Zambia | 5–0 | 6–0 | 2014 African Women's Championship |
| 15. | 25 October 2014 | Sam Nujoma Stadium, Windhoek, Namibia | Cameroon | 1–0 | 2–0 | 2014 African Women's Championship |
| 16. | 10 April 2015 | Moshood Abiola National Stadium, Abuja, Nigeria | Mali | 1–0 | 8–0 | Football at the 2015 African Games – Women's qualification |
| 17. | 10 April 2015 | Moshood Abiola National Stadium, Abuja, Nigeria | Mali | 4−0 | 8–0 | Football at the 2015 African Games – Women's qualification |
| 18. | 6 September 2015 | Stade Alphonse Massemba-Débat, Brazzaville, Congo | Congo | 1–0 | 5−1 | Football at the 2015 African Games – Women's tournament |
| 19. | 6 September 2015 | Stade Alphonse Massemba-Débat, Brazzaville, Congo | Congo | 3−0 | 5−1 | Football at the 2015 African Games – Women's tournament |
| 20. | 6 September 2015 | Stade Alphonse Massemba-Débat, Brazzaville, Congo | Congo | 4−1 | 5−1 | Football at the 2015 African Games – Women's tournament |
| 21. | 9 September 2015 | Stade Alphonse Massemba-Débat, Brazzaville, Congo | Tanzania | 1–0 | 3−0 | Football at the 2015 African Games – Women's tournament |
| 22. | 9 September 2015 | Stade Alphonse Massemba-Débat, Brazzaville, Congo | Tanzania | 2−0 | 3−0 | Football at the 2015 African Games – Women's tournament |
| 23. | 26 November 2016 | Limbe Stadium, Limbe, Cameroon | Kenya | 4–0 | 4–0 | 2016 Women's Africa Cup of Nations |
| 24. | 29 November 2016 | Limbe Stadium, Limbe, Cameroon | South Africa | 1–0 | 1–0 | 2016 Women's Africa Cup of Nations |
| 25. | 3 December 2016 | Stade Ahmadou Ahidjo, Yaoundé, Cameroon | Cameroon | 1–0 | 1–0 | 2016 Women's Africa Cup of Nations |
| 26. | 11 June 2018 | Agege Stadium, Lagos, Nigeria | Gambia | 1–0 | 6–0 | 2018 Women's Africa Cup of Nations qualification |
| 27. | 11 June 2018 | Agege Stadium, Lagos, Nigeria | Gambia | 3–0 | 6–0 | 2018 Women's Africa Cup of Nations qualification |
| 28. | 11 June 2018 | Agege Stadium, Lagos, Nigeria | Gambia | 4–0 | 6–0 | 2018 Women's Africa Cup of Nations qualification |
| 29. | 11 June 2018 | Agege Stadium, Lagos, Nigeria | Gambia | 6–0 | 6–0 | 2018 Women's Africa Cup of Nations qualification |
| 30. | 21 November 2018 | Cape Coast Sports Stadium, Cape Coast, Ghana | Zambia | 1–0 | 4–0 | 2018 Women's Africa Cup of Nations |
| 31. | 24 November 2018 | Cape Coast Sports Stadium, Cape Coast, Ghana | Equatorial Guinea | 5–0 | 6–0 | 2018 Women's Africa Cup of Nations |
| 32. | 8 April 2019 | Pinatar Stadium, Murcia, Spain | Canada | 1–0 | 1–2 | Friendly |
| 33. | 11 April 2023 | Marden Sports Complex, Alanya, Turkey | New Zealand | 3–0 | 3–0 | Friendly |

== Honours ==
=== International ===
Nigeria

- African Women's Championship: 2010, 2014, 2016, 2018

Individual

- 2014 African Women's Championship : Golden Boot

=== Club ===
Delta Queens

- Nigerian Women's Championship: 2011, 2012
