= 2012 African Women's Championship qualification =

Tournament details
- Dates: -
- Teams: 24 (from 1 confederation)

Tournament statistics
- Matches played: -
- Top scorer: -

This page provides the summaries of the matches of the qualifying rounds for the group stage of the 2012 African Women's Championship.

A total of 24 national teams entered qualification, which was held over two rounds. In the preliminary round, 20 nations were drawn in pairs. The ten winners joined the four semifinalists of the 2010 Women's African Football Championship in the first round, where the seven winners qualified for the finals.

== Preliminary round ==
The preliminary round was held on 13–15 January 2012 (first leg) and 27–29 January 2012 (second leg).

=== Summary ===
Team 1	Agg.	Team 2	1st leg	2nd leg
Egypt	4–6	Ethiopia	4–2	0–4
Namibia	2–7	Tanzania	0–2	2–5
Ivory Coast	10–1	Guinea	5–1	5–0
Kenya	w/o^{1}	Mozambique	—	—
Zambia	9–4	Malawi	7–0	2–4
Morocco	2–2 (5–3 pen)	Tunisia	2–0	0–2
Senegal	w/o^{2}	Burundi	—	—
Botswana	1–3	Zimbabwe	0–1	1–2
Uganda	1–5	DR Congo	1–1	0–4
Mali	0–8	Ghana	0–3	0–5

Notes

- Note 1: Mozambique advanced to the first round after Kenya withdrew.
- Note 2: Senegal advanced to the first round after Burundi withdrew.

=== Matches ===
14 January 2012
14:00 UTC+3

Egypt	4–2	Ethiopia
Atia 9', 62' (pen.); Tarek 67'; Abd El Hafiz 84'	Report	Biza; Abaa 90'

Cairo
29 January 2012

Ethiopia	4–0	Egypt
Zergaw 36', 53'; Siefu 70'; Gebrekirstos 85'	Report

Addis Ababa

Ethiopia advances to the first round.

14 January 2012

Namibia	0–2	Tanzania
	Report	Rashid 64'; Mwanahamisi 87'

Windhoek
29 January 2012

Tanzania	5–2	Namibia

Dar es Salaam

Tanzania advances to the first round.

14 January 2012

Ivory Coast	5–1	Guinea
Gnago 10', 72'; Nahi 21', 55'; Nrehy 35'	Report	Marra 40'

Abidjan
29 January 2012

Guinea	0–5	Ivory Coast

Conakry

Côte d'Ivoire advances to the first round.

Kenya	w/o	Mozambique

Mozambique advanced to the first round after Kenya withdrew.

14 January 2012
14:00 UTC+3

Zambia	7–0	Malawi
Sosala 2', 28'; Mupopo 4'; Bowa 35', 79'; Kibanji 50'; M.Zulu 57'	Report

Lusaka
29 January 2012

Malawi	4–2	Zambia

Blantyre

Zambia advances to the first round.

14 January 2012

Morocco	2–0	Tunisia
Jraidi 25'; Chebbak 63'	Report

Rabat
28 January 2012

Tunisia	2–0	Morocco
Houij 15', 37'
Penalties
	3–5

Soliman

Morocco advances to the first round.

Senegal	w/o	Burundi

Senegal advanced to the first round after Burundi withdrew.

14 January 2012

Botswana	0–1	Zimbabwe
	Report	Jene 47'

Gaborone
29 January 2012

Zimbabwe	2–1	Botswana

Harare

Zimbabwe advances to the first round.

14 January 2012

Uganda	1–1	DR Congo
Luwedde 19'	Report	Tondo 7'

Kampala
28 January 2012

DR Congo	4–0	Uganda
Pambani 2'; Malembo 25'; Diantesa 77' (pen.); Tondo 85'	Report

Kinshasa

Congo DR advances to the first round.

15 January 2012

Mali	0–3	Ghana
	Report	Ibrahim 35'; Myles 60'; Zikpi 75'

Bamako
29 January 2012

Ghana	5–0	Mali

Accra

Ghana advances to the first round.

== First round ==
The first round was held on 25–27 May 2012 (first leg) and 15–17 June 2012 (second leg).

=== Summary ===
Team 1	Agg.	Team 2	1st leg	2nd leg
Ethiopia	3–1	Tanzania	2–1	1–0
Ivory Coast	12–0	Mozambique	7–0	5–0
Zambia	2–6	South Africa	1–4	1–2
Morocco	0–0 (4–5 p)	Senegal	0–0	0–0
Zimbabwe	0–6	Nigeria	0–2	0–4
DR Congo	w/o^{1}	Equatorial Guinea	—	—
Ghana	2–2 (8–9 p)	Cameroon	1–1	1–1

Notes

- Note 1: Match has been called off. DR Congo advanced to the final tournament, as Equatorial Guinea is qualified as hosts.

=== Matches ===
27 May 2012

Ethiopia	2–1	Tanzania
	Report

16 June 2012

Tanzania	0–1	Ethiopia
	Report

Ethiopia advances to the final tournament.

26 May 2012

Ivory Coast	7–0	Mozambique
	Report

16 June 2012

Mozambique	0–5	Ivory Coast
	Report	B.Diakité 2'; Akaffou 25'; Gnago 29'; Nahi 45+1'; Essoh 90+1'

Côte d'Ivoire advances to the final tournament.

26 May 2012

Zambia	1–4	South Africa
	Report

16 June 2012

South Africa	2–1	Zambia
Modise 19', 46'	Report	Bowa 20'

South Africa advances to the final tournament.

26 May 2012

Morocco	0–0	Senegal
	Report

16 June 2012

Senegal	0–0	Morocco
	Report
Penalties
	5–4

Senegal advances to the final tournament.

27 May 2012

Zimbabwe	0–2	Nigeria
	Report

16 June 2012

Nigeria	4–0	Zimbabwe
Nkwocha 8'; Oparanozie 16'; Sunday 18'; Mbachu 58'	Report

Teslim Balogun Stadium, Lagos, Nigeria

Nigeria advances to the final tournament.

26 May 2012

Ghana	1–1	Cameroon
Okoe 81'	Report	Iven 65'

17 June 2012

Cameroon	1–1	Ghana
Manie 87' (pen.)	Report	Aduako 35'
Penalties
	10–9

Cameroon advances to the final tournament.

DR Congo	w/o	Equatorial Guinea

Matches cancelled; Equatorial Guinea qualify automatically as host of final tournament, and Congo DR qualify as walkover winners of this tie.
