= Genoveva Añonman =

Equatoguinean football manager

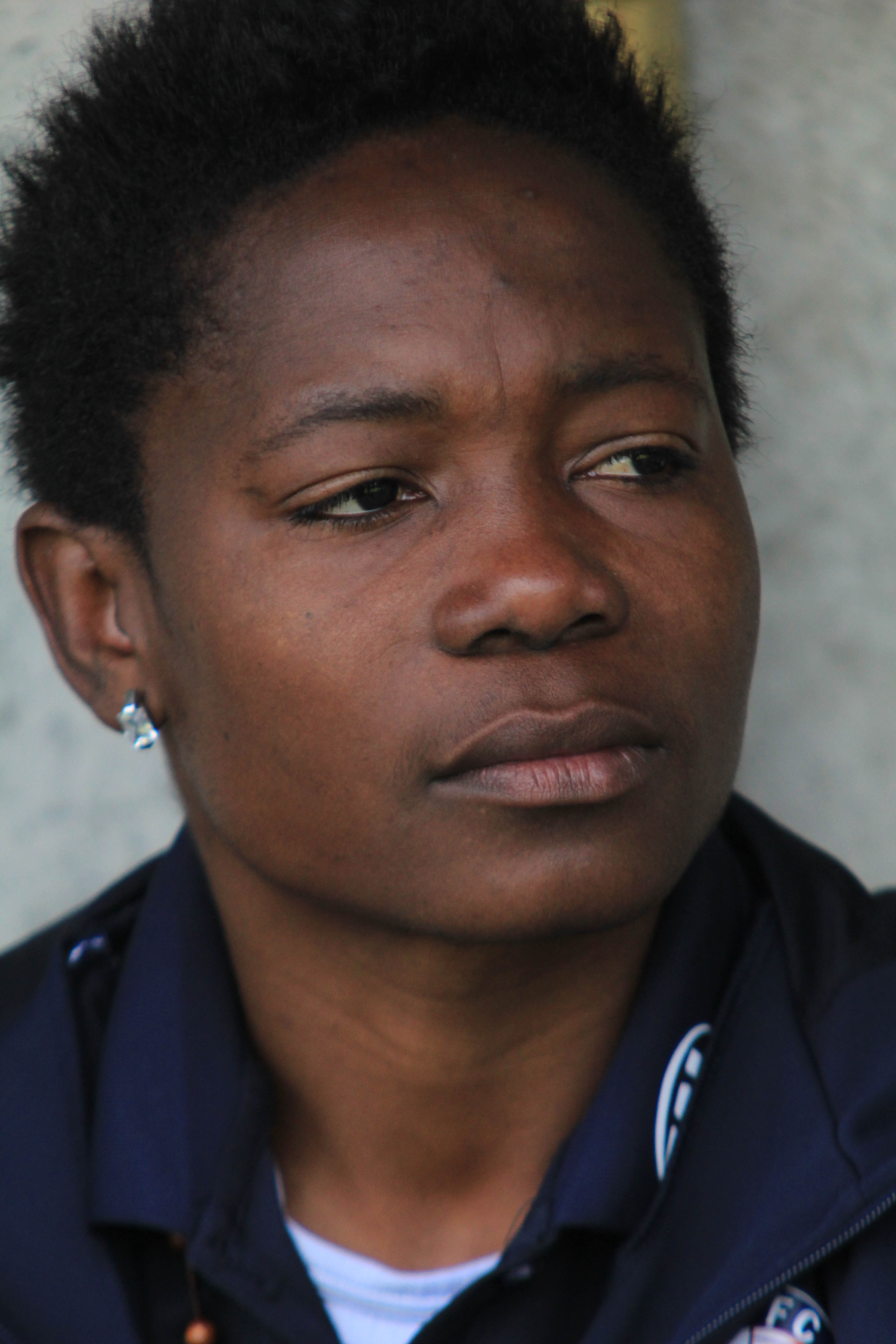
- Añonman in May 2012

Personal information
- Full name: Genoveva Añonman Nze Ataha
- Date of birth: 19 April 1989 (age 37)
- Place of birth: Kogo, Equatorial Guinea
- Height: 1.65 m (5 ft 5 in)
- Position: Forward

Team information
- Current team: 15 de Agosto Women (manager)

Senior career*
Years	Team	Apps	(Gls)
2002–2005	Águilas Verdes de Malabo		
2006	Las Vegas		
2006–2007	Mamelodi Sundowns		
2009–2011	Jena	50	(37)
2011–2015	Turbine Potsdam	79	(60)
2015	Portland Thorns	12	(1)
2016	Suwon FMC WFC		
2016–2017	Atlético Madrid	5	(3)
2017–2018	Maccabi Kishronot Hadera	6	(2)
2018	MSV Duisburg	7	(2)
2018	Leones Vegetarianos		
2019	Deportivo Evinayong		
2021–2022	Rafelbunyol	15	(20)
2023	Rafelbunyol	8	(8)

International career
2002–2018	Equatorial Guinea	32	(24)
- Equatorial Guinea B

Managerial career
- 2024: Santa Bibiana
- 2024–: 15 de Agosto Women
- 2025–: Equatorial Guinea U20 Women (assistant)
Medal record
Women's football
Representing Equatorial Guinea
Women's Africa Cup of Nations
First place	2008 Equatorial Guinea
Second place	2010 South Africa
First place	2012 Equatorial Guinea
- * Club domestic league appearances and goals as of 20 May 2023

Genoveva Añonman Nze Ataha (born 19 April 1989), also known as Genoveva Añonma, is an Equatorial Guinean football manager and former professional player who played as a forward. She coaches 15 de Agosto in the Equatoguinean Primera División femenina. She is the historical captain and top scorer of the Equatorial Guinea women's national team, for which she played for 16 years.

== Club career ==
Añonman, nicknamed Ayo, played in her country and South Africa before signing for Bundesliga team USV Jena in 2009. She was the team's top scorer in both seasons she spent in Jena. Following the 2011 World Cup she signed for defending champions Turbine Potsdam. She became the first foreigner to win the Bundesliga top-scorer award when she scored 22 goals in the 2011–12 season. In 2012, she was named African Women Footballer of the Year.

On 24 February 2015, it was announced that Añonman signed for the Portland Thorns for the 2015 National Women's Soccer League season, joining after the completion of that year's World Cup. She was waived by Portland Thorns FC in October 2015. In 2016, she played for Suwon FMC WFC in the South Korean WK-League.

== International career ==
Añonman was part of the Equatorial Guinea football team that won the 2008 African Women's Championship at home and finished runners up in South Africa two years later. After the 2010 African Women's Championship final, she and two other Equatoguinean players had been accused of being male by opponents. She rejected the allegations and was shown by a gender test to be female, wherein she was required to strip naked to demonstrate her gender.

Añonman played in the 2011 FIFA Women's World Cup, scoring Equatorial Guinea's only two goals in the tournament, in a 3–2 loss against Australia. She was included in the All-Star Team, becoming the first African player to earn this distinction. She won a second African Women's Championship in 2012, again at home.

=== International goals ===
Scores and results list Equatorial Guinea's goal tally first

No.	Date	Venue	Opponent	Score	Result	Competition
1	24 August 2002	Estadio La Paz, Malabo, Equatorial Guinea	Angola	1–0	1–3	2002 African Women's Championship qualification
2	3 November 2006	Oghara Township Stadium, Oghara, Nigeria	Algeria	1–0	3–3	2006 African Women's Championship
3	15 November 2008	Estadio de Malabo, Malabo, Equatorial Guinea	Cameroon	1–0	1–0	2008 African Women's Championship
4	18 November 2008	Estadio de Malabo, Malabo, Equatorial Guinea	Congo	4–2	5–2	2008 African Women's Championship
5	18 November 2008	Estadio de Malabo, Malabo, Equatorial Guinea	Congo	5–2	5–2	2008 African Women's Championship
6	21 November 2008	Estadio de Malabo, Malabo, Equatorial Guinea	Mali	2–1	2–1	2008 African Women's Championship
7	25 November 2008	Estadio de Malabo, Malabo, Equatorial Guinea	Nigeria	1–0	1–0	2008 African Women's Championship
8	29 November 2008	Estadio de Malabo, Malabo, Equatorial Guinea	South Africa	2–1	2–1	2008 African Women's Championship
9	23 May 2010	Sam Nujoma Stadium, Windhoek, Namibia	Namibia	2–1	5–1	2010 African Women's Championship qualification
10	8 November 2010	Sinaba Stadium, Daveyton, South Africa	Ghana	1–0	3–1	2010 African Women's Championship
11	17 April 2011	Estadio de Malabo, Malabo, Equatorial Guinea	Cameroon	1–0	0–3 (Note: Match forfeited.)	2012 CAF Women's Pre-Olympic Tournament
12	17 June 2011	Stade Jos Becker, Niederanven, Luxembourg	Luxembourg	4–0	8–0	Friendly
13	3 July 2011	Ruhrstadion, Bochum, Germany	Australia	1–1	2–3	2011 FIFA Women's World Cup
14	3 July 2011	Ruhrstadion, Bochum, Germany	Australia	2–3	2–3	2011 FIFA Women's World Cup
15	25 June 2012	Estadio de Malabo, Malabo, Equatorial Guinea	DR Congo	2–1	2–1	Friendly
16	31 October 2012	Estadio de Malabo, Malabo, Equatorial Guinea	DR Congo	1–0	6–0	2012 African Women's Championship
17	31 October 2012	Estadio de Malabo, Malabo, Equatorial Guinea	DR Congo	4–0	6–0	2012 African Women's Championship
18	31 October 2012	Estadio de Malabo, Malabo, Equatorial Guinea	DR Congo	5–0	6–0	2012 African Women's Championship
19	3 November 2012	Estadio de Malabo, Malabo, Equatorial Guinea	Senegal	5–0	5–0	2012 African Women's Championship
20	7 November 2012	Estadio de Malabo, Malabo, Equatorial Guinea	Cameroon	2–0	2–0	2012 African Women's Championship
21	11 November 2012	Estadio de Malabo, Malabo, Equatorial Guinea	South Africa	3–0	4–0	2012 African Women's Championship
22	23 May 2014	Stade Robert Champroux, Abidjan, Ivory Coast	Ivory Coast	1–0	1–1	2014 African Women's Championship qualification
23	2 August 2015	Estadio de Bata, Bata, Equatorial Guinea	Nigeria	2–1	2–1	2015 CAF Women's Olympic Qualifying Tournament
24	6 April 2016	Stade Mamadou Konaté, Bamako, Mali	Mali	1–0	1–1	2016 Africa Women Cup of Nations qualification

== Honors and awards ==
=== National team ===
- Africa Women Cup of Nations: 2008, 2012
