= Marlyse Ngo Ndoumbouk =

Cameroonian footballer

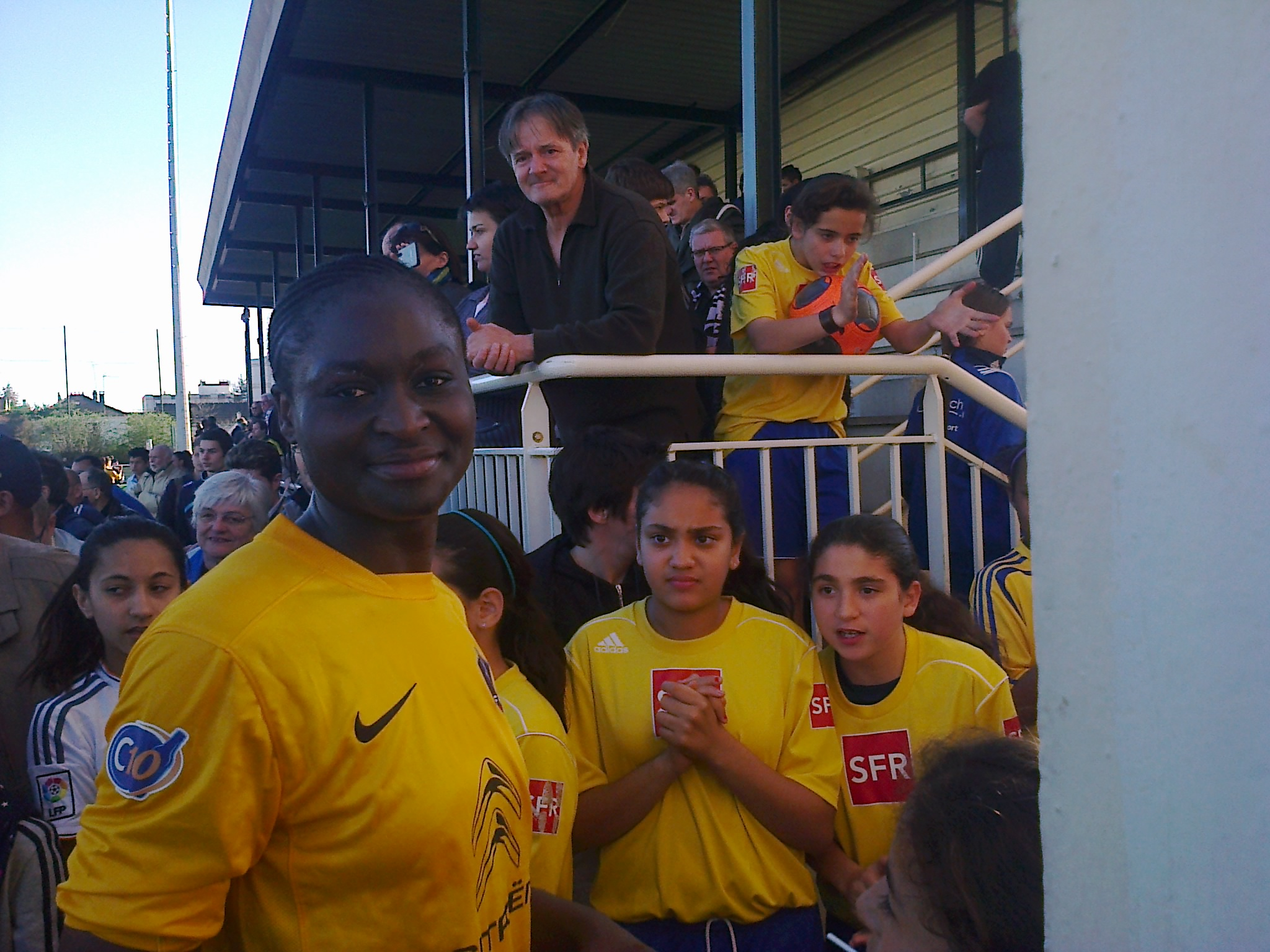
- Ngo Ndoumbouk with VGA Saint-Maur in March 2014

Personal information
- Full name: Marlyse Bernadette Ngo Ndoumbouk
- Date of birth: 3 January 1985 (age 41)
- Place of birth: Yaoundé, Cameroon
- Height: 1.79 m (5 ft 10 in)
- Positions: Forward; midfielder

Youth career
- 1995–1999: Louves MINCOF Yaoundé

Senior career*
Years	Team	Apps	(Gls)
2000–2006	Louves MINCOF Yaoundé	89	(30)
2007	Lorema FC	57	(27)
2008	FC Indiana	11	(0)
2009	Canon Yaoundé	29	(7)
2010–2011	USV Jena	16	(0)
2011	SC Sand		
2013	Tours	4	(5)
2013–2015	VGA Saint-Maur	56	(70)
2016–2019	Nancy	48	(48)
2019	Lille	0	(0)
2020-2021	FC Metz		
2021-2022	Racing FC Union		

International career^{‡}
2002–	Cameroon		(6)
- * Club domestic league appearances and goals as of 04 August 2019 (UTC) ‡ National team caps and goals as of 17 May 2019

Marlyse Bernadette Ngo Ndoumbouk (born 3 January 1985) is a Cameroonian footballer who plays as a forward/midfielder for the Cameroon women's national team.

== International career ==
Ngo Ndoumbouk played for the senior team of Cameroon at several Africa Women Cup of Nations editions (2006, 2008, 2010, 2018).

=== International goals ===
Scores and results list Cameroon's goal tally first

No.	Date	Venue	Opponent	Score	Result	Competition
1	11 July 2004	Stade Alphonse Massemba-Débat, Brazzaville, Republic of the Congo	Congo	2–0	2–0	2004 African Women's Championship qualification
2	22 July 2006	Ahmadou Ahidjo Stadium, Yaoundé, Cameroon	Kenya	4–0	4–0	2006 African Women's Championship qualification
3	4 November 2006	Warri Township Stadium, Warri, Nigeria	Mali	2–0	2–0	2006 African Women's Championship
4	18 November 2008	Estadio de Malabo, Malabo, Equatorial Guinea	Mali	2–1	2–1	2008 African Women's Championship
5	5 November 2010	Sinaba Stadium, Daveyton, South Africa	Ghana	2–1	2–1	2010 African Women's Championship
