= 2010 African Women's Championship =

Association football tournament

2010 Vroue se Afrikaanse Voetbalkampioenschap

Tournament details
- Host country: South Africa
- Dates: 31 October – 14 November
- Teams: 8
- Venues: 2 (in 2 host cities)

Final positions
- Champions: Nigeria (8th title)
- Runners-up: Equatorial Guinea
- Third place: South Africa
- Fourth place: Cameroon

Tournament statistics
- Matches played: 16
- Goals scored: 59 (3.69 per match)
- Top scorer(s): (Nigeria) Perpetua Nkwocha (11 goals)

The 2010 African Women's Championship was held in South Africa from 31 October to 14 November 2010. Seven national teams joined the host nation following a series of knock-out home and away ties. This tournament was also a qualification tournament for the 2011 FIFA Women's World Cup, with the two finalists, Nigeria and Equatorial Guinea qualifying for the finals in Germany.

== Qualification ==
A total of 23 national teams entered qualification which has held over two rounds. In the preliminary round, the 18 lowest-ranked nations were drawn in pairs. The nine winners joined five other national teams in the first round, where the seven winners qualified for the finals.

Qualified teams

- Algeria
- Cameroon
- Equatorial Guinea
- Ghana
- Mali
- Nigeria
- South Africa
- Tanzania

== Group stage ==
The final tournament was held in Gauteng, South Africa from 31 October to 14 November 2010. The seven first round winners joined the host in the finals. The draw took place on 21 September.

Matches were played at Sinaba Stadium in Daveyton and Makhulong Stadium in Tembisa (both located in the Ekurhuleni Metropolitan Municipality, Gauteng).

=== Tiebreakers ===
Where teams finish the group stage at an equal number of points, the ranking in the group is determined based on:

1. greater number of points in matches between tied teams
2. superior goal difference in matches between tied teams
3. greater number of goals scored in matches between tied teams
4. superior goal difference in all group matches
5. greater number of goals scored in all group matches
6. fair play criteria based on red and yellow cards received
7. drawing of lots

=== Group A ===
Pos	Team	Pld	W	D	L	GF	GA	GD	Pts	Qualification
1	Nigeria	3	3	0	0	10	1	+9	9	Advance to knockout stage
2	South Africa (H)	3	2	0	1	7	3	+4	6	Advance to knockout stage
3	Mali	3	1	0	2	3	11	−8	3	
4	Tanzania	3	0	0	3	3	8	−5	0	

Rules for classification: Group stage tiebreakers
(H) Hosts

All times are SAST (UTC+2)

31 October 2010
13:00

South Africa	2–1	Tanzania
Popela 35'; Mamello 87' (pen.)	Report	Chabruma 43'

Sinaba Stadium, Daveyton
Referee: Therese Neguel (Cameroon)
1 November 2010
15:30

Nigeria	5–0	Mali
Nkwocha 15', 16', 42'; Mbachu 70'; Ordega 84'	Report

Sinaba Stadium, Daveyton
Referee: Therese Sagno (Guinea)

4 November 2010
11:00

South Africa	1–2	Nigeria
van Wyk 44'	Report	Nkwocha 33', 39'

Sinaba Stadium, Daveyton
Referee: Fadouma Dia (Senegal)
4 November 2010
15:30

Mali	3–2	Tanzania
Konate 25'; Diarra 31'; N'Diaye 67'	Report	Mwasikili 30'; Swalehe 32'

Sinaba Stadium, Daveyton
Referee: Patricia Obone Obiang (Gabon)

7 November 2010
15:30

Mali	0–4	South Africa
	Report	Amanda 32', 76', 90'; Jermaine 84'

Sinaba Stadium, Daveyton
Referee: Fadouma Dia (Senegal)
7 November 2010
15:30

Tanzania	0–3	Nigeria
	Report	Nkwocha 12', 32'; Oparanozie 82'

Makhulong Stadium, Tembisa
Referee: Aissatta Ameyo Amegee (Togo)

=== Group B ===
Pos	Team	Pld	W	D	L	GF	GA	GD	Pts	Qualification
1	Equatorial Guinea	3	2	1	0	6	3	+3	7 (Note: Tied on head-to-head points. Overall goal difference: Equatorial Guinea +3, Cameroon +2.)	Advance to knockout stage
2	Cameroon	3	2	1	0	6	4	+2	7	Advance to knockout stage
3	Ghana	3	1	0	2	4	6	−2	3	
4	Algeria	3	0	0	3	2	5	−3	0	

Rules for classification: Group stage tiebreakers
Notes:

All times are SAST (UTC+2)

2 November 2010
11:00

Equatorial Guinea	2–2	Cameroon
Jade 2'; Jumária 30'	Report	Patiance 45+1'; Michele 57'

Sinaba Stadium, Daveyton
Referee: Aissata Ameyo Amegee (Togo)
2 November 2010
15:30

Algeria	1–2	Ghana
Ouadah 4'	Report	Agnes 62', 73'

Sinaba Stadium, Daveyton
Referee: Fadouma Dia (Senegal)

5 November 2010
11:00

Equatorial Guinea	1–0	Algeria
Chinasa 31'	Report

Sinaba Stadium, Daveyton
Referee: Kankou Coulibaly (Mali)
5 November 2010
15:30

Ghana	1–2	Cameroon
Agnes 31'	Report	Manie 24'; Ngo Ndoumbouk 37'

Sinaba Stadium, Daveyton
Referee: Pamela Chiwaya (Zimbabwe)

8 November 2010
15:30

Ghana	1–3	Equatorial Guinea
Agnes 40' (pen.)	Report	Añonma 12' (pen.); S. Simporé 58'; Chinasa 68'

Sinaba Stadium, Daveyton
Referee: Pamela Chiwaya (Zimbabwe)
8 November 2010
15:30

Cameroon	2–1	Algeria
Onguene 50'; Ejangue 65'	Report	Bouhani 55'

Makhulong Stadium, Tembisa
Referee: Therese Sagno (Guinea)

== Knockout stage ==
=== Bracket ===
Semi-finals
11 November - Daveyton
Nigeria	5
Cameroon	1
11 November - Daveyton
Equatorial Guinea (a.e.t.)	3
South Africa	1

Final
14 November - Daveyton
Nigeria	4
Equatorial Guinea	2
Third place play-off
14 November - Daveyton
Cameroon	0
South Africa	2

=== Semi-finals ===
All times are SAST (UTC+2)

Winners qualified for 2011 FIFA Women's World Cup.

11 November 2010
10:30

Nigeria	5–1	Cameroon
Helen Ukaonu 33'; Oparanozie 45+1'; Nkwocha 58', 74', 81' (pen.)	Report	Ngock 47'

Sinaba Stadium, Daveyton
Referee: Therese Sagno (Guinea)

11 November 2010
15:30

Equatorial Guinea	3 – 1 (a.e.t.)	South Africa
S. Simporé 103', 120+5'; Jade 109'	Report	Dlamini 120+8'

Sinaba Stadium, Daveyton
Referee: Aisatta Ameyo Amegee (Togo)

=== Third place play-off ===
14 November 2010
10:00

Cameroon	0–2	South Africa
	Report	Skiti 8'; Dlamini 38'

Sinaba Stadium, Daveyton
Referee: Pamela Chiwaya (Zimbabwe)

=== Final ===
14 November 2010
14:00

Nigeria	4–2	Equatorial Guinea
Nkwocha 8'; Oparanozie 76'; Nke 77' (o.g.); Carol 84' (o.g.)	Report	Carol 62'; Jade 81'

Sinaba Stadium, Daveyton
Referee: Fadouma Dia (Senegal)

== Awards ==
2010 African Women's Football Championship winners

Nigeria
8th title
