= Jade Boho =

Equatoguinean footballer (born 1986)

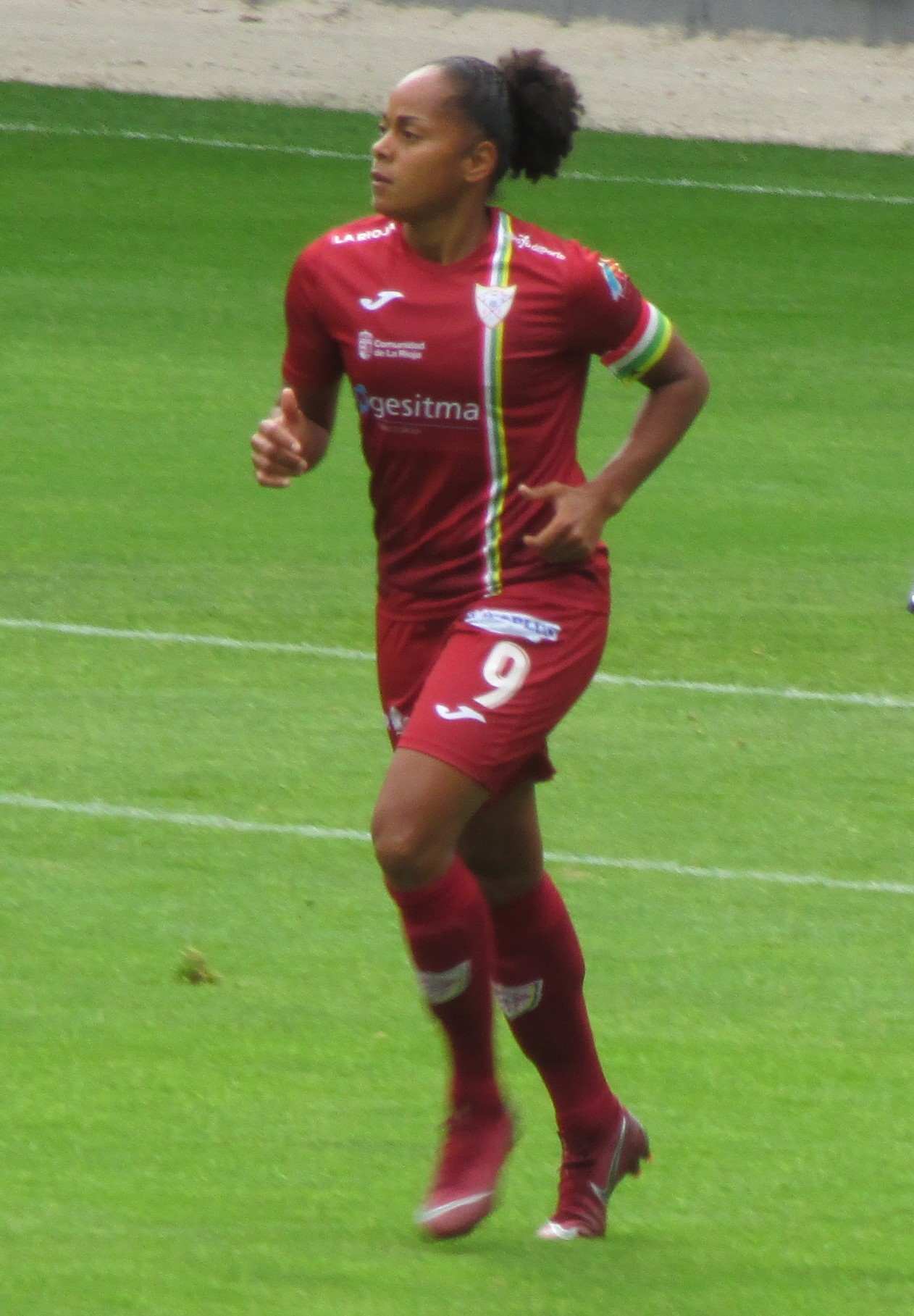
- Jade with Logroño in 2019

Personal information
- Full name: Jade Boho Sayo
- Date of birth: 30 August 1986 (age 40)
- Place of birth: Valladolid, Spain
- Height: 1.65 m (5 ft 5 in)
- Position: Striker

Youth career
- 2000–2003: Orcasitas

Senior career*
Years	Team	Apps	(Gls)
2003–2007	Torrejón	34+	(19+)
2007–2013	Rayo Vallecano	138	(44)
2013–2014	Atlético Madrid	28	(12)
2014–2015	Rayo Vallecano	29	(10)
2015	Bristol Academy	6	(3)
2016	Reading	8	(1)
2016–2018	Madrid CFF	22 (Note: Does not include league appearances from the 2016–2017 season.)	(14)
2018–2021	Logroño	76	(28)
2021–2022	Servette	18	(8)
2022–2023	Alhama	25	(3)

International career^{‡}
2003–2005	Spain U-19	21	(12)
2010–2018	Equatorial Guinea	13	(18)
Medal record
Women's football
Representing Spain
UEFA Women's Under-19 Championship
First place	2004 Finland
Representing Equatorial Guinea
Women's Africa Cup of Nations
Second place	2010 South Africa
First place	2012 Equatorial Guinea
- * Club domestic league appearances and goals as of 20 May 2023. ‡ National team caps and goals as of 13 April 2014

Jade Boho Sayo (born 30 August 1986), known as Jade Boho or just Jade, is a former professional footballer who played as a forward. She has spent most of her club career in Spain, but also competed in England and Switzerland. Born and raised in Spain to a Spanish father and an Equatorial Guinean mother, she has represented Spain and Equatorial Guinea at under-19 and senior levels, respectively.

== Early life ==
Jade took the surnames of her mother, Lourdes Cristina Boho Sayo, an Equatoguinean emigrant who received Spanish citizenship in August 1980, and, five years later, played Oud Anna in the film Dust, before Jade was born. Her father, whose name is unknown, was Spanish, from Valladolid, where Lourdes was working and living. Jade never met him.

== Club career ==
=== Spain ===
Jade previously played for AD Torrejón CF. and Rayo Vallecano, winning three championships and one national cup and playing the UEFA Champions League with the latter.

=== England ===
In summer 2015 Jade signed for Bristol Academy who were winless and at the bottom of the FA WSL table. Despite making long journeys for national team duty in Africa, she proved a prolific goalscorer and was hailed as "inspirational" by the team's coach. When Bristol were relegated, Jade left the club to sign for Reading ahead of the 2016 FA WSL season but her stay was short after making the decision to return to Madrid. Her last appearance for the club was on 30 October against Chelsea.

== International career ==
=== Spain U19 ===
Jade was born and raised in Spain, but her mother is from Equatorial Guinea, so she was eligible to represent either country. She played in the Spanish team that won the 2004 UEFA Women's Under-19 Championship, scoring the first goal of the final match against Germany.

=== Equatorial Guinea ===
Jade has been a member of the Equatoguinean senior team since 2010. Because Jade competed for Spain in the 2004 FIFA U-19 Women's World Championship, scoring two goals in the second match, she had been registered as a Spanish player in FIFA's database.

Just days prior to the 2011 FIFA Women's World Cup, FIFA temporarily suspended Jade from both international and club competition for two months, on the grounds that she was playing with Equatorial Guinea while having played with a Spanish national team within the past five years. Since the Equatoguinean Football Federation did not complete the process of changing her FIFA-registered nationality in a timely manner, she was declared ineligible, and Equatorial Guinea were also removed from qualifying for the 2012 Summer Olympics as a result. In September 2011 she announced she would not play for Equatorial Guinea anymore. However, Jade reversed her decision a year later, to go to Malabo for a friendly match against the Democratic Republic of the Congo in June 2012. She then won the African Championship that year.

=== International goals ===
Scores and results list Equatorial Guinea's goal tally first

No.	Date	Venue	Opponent	Score	Result	Competition
1	2 November 2010	Sinaba Stadium, Daveyton, South Africa	Cameroon	1–0	2–2	2010 African Women's Championship
2	11 November 2010	Sinaba Stadium, Daveyton, South Africa	South Africa	2–0	3–1	2010 African Women's Championship
3	14 November 2010	Sinaba Stadium, Daveyton, South Africa	Nigeria	2–3	2–4	2010 African Women's Championship
4	17 April 2011	Estadio de Malabo, Malabo, Equatorial Guinea	Cameroon	2–0	0–3 (Note: Match forfeited.)	2012 CAF Women's Pre-Olympic Tournament
5	23 June 2012	Estadio de Malabo, Malabo, Equatorial Guinea	DR Congo	2–0	3–0	Friendly
6	31 October 2012	Estadio de Malabo, Malabo, Equatorial Guinea	DR Congo	6–0	6–0	2012 African Women's Championship
7	3 November 2012	Estadio de Malabo, Malabo, Equatorial Guinea	Senegal	1–0	5–0	2012 African Women's Championship
8	3 November 2012	Estadio de Malabo, Malabo, Equatorial Guinea	Senegal	2–0	5–0	2012 African Women's Championship
9	7 June 2014	Estadio de Malabo, Malabo, Equatorial Guinea	Ivory Coast	1–0	2–2	2014 African Women's Championship qualification
10	23 May 2015	Stade de Kinkala, Kinkala, Republic of the Congo	Congo	2–0	3–0	2015 CAF Women's Olympic Qualifying Tournament
11	23 May 2015	Stade de Kinkala, Kinkala, Republic of the Congo	Congo	3–0	3–0	2015 CAF Women's Olympic Qualifying Tournament
12	31 May 2015	Estadio de Bata, Bata, Equatorial Guinea	Congo	1–0	4–0	2015 CAF Women's Olympic Qualifying Tournament
13	31 May 2015	Estadio de Bata, Bata, Equatorial Guinea	Congo	2–0	4–0	2015 CAF Women's Olympic Qualifying Tournament
14	31 May 2015	Estadio de Bata, Bata, Equatorial Guinea	Congo	3–0	4–0	2015 CAF Women's Olympic Qualifying Tournament
15	10 April 2016	Estadio de Malabo, Malabo, Equatorial Guinea	Mali	1–0	2–1	2016 Africa Women Cup of Nations qualification
16	26 November 2017	Estadio de Malabo, Malabo, Equatorial Guinea	Comoros	3–0	4–0	Friendly
17	26 November 2017	Estadio de Malabo, Malabo, Equatorial Guinea	Comoros	4–0	4–0	Friendly
18	6 June 2018	Kenyatta Stadium, Machakos, Kenya	Kenya	1–0	1–2	2018 Africa Women Cup of Nations qualification

== Honours ==
=== Club ===
- Rayo Vallecano
  - Spanish Championship: 2008–09, 2009–10, 2010–11
  - Copa de la Reina de Fútbol: 2008

=== International ===
- Spain U-19
  - UEFA Women's Under-19 Championship: 2004
- Equatorial Guinea
  - African Women's Championship: 2012; runner-up: 2010

== Personal life ==
Although born in Valladolid, Jade feels Madrilenian as she has lived in Madrid since she was three months old. She is openly lesbian.
