= Gloria Chinasa =

Nigerian footballer (born 1987)

Chinasa Okoro
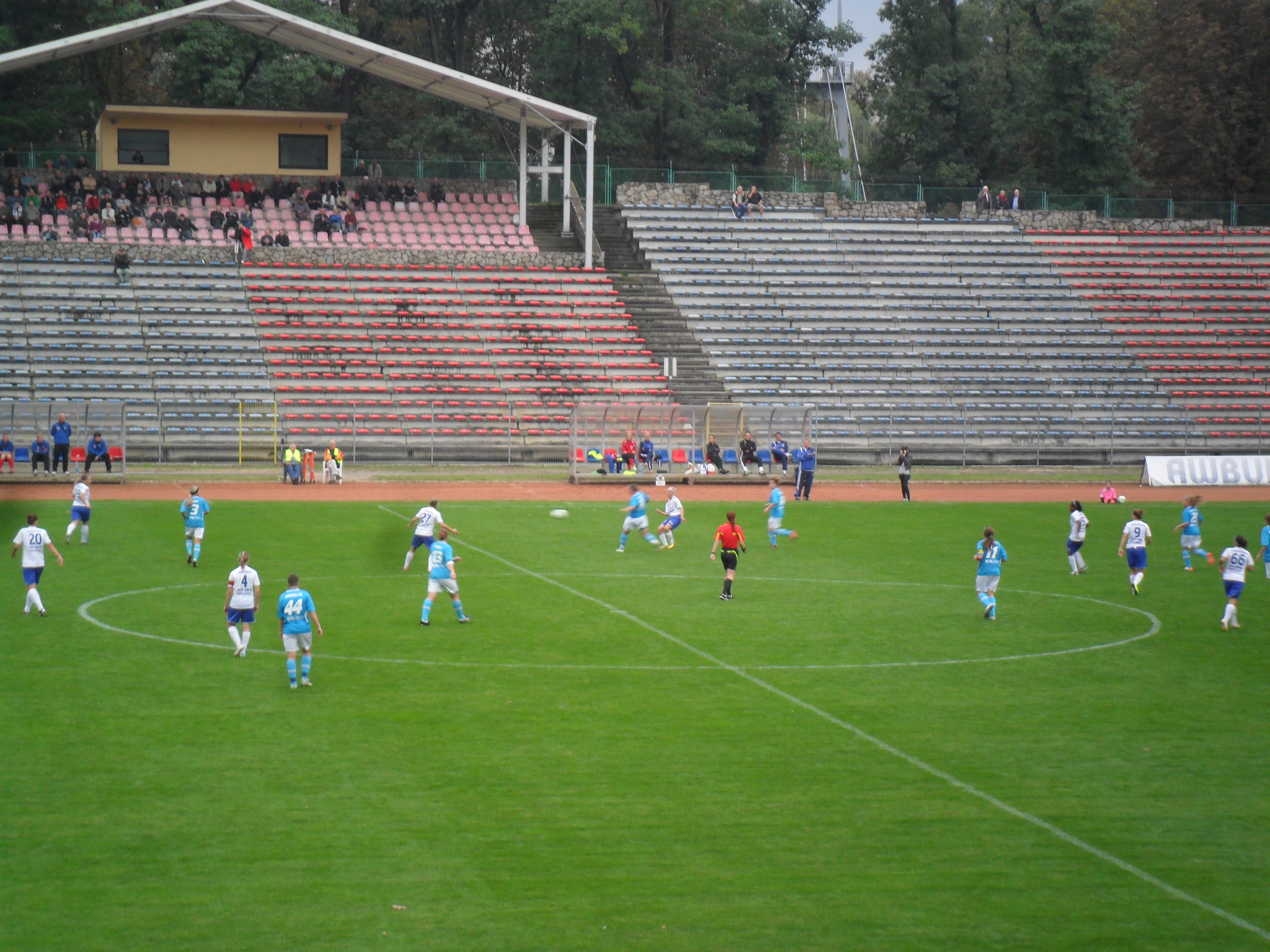
- Okoro with Unia Racibórz in 2012

Personal information
- Full name: Gloria Chinasa Okoro
- Date of birth: 8 December 1987 (age 38)
- Place of birth: Enugu, Nigeria
- Height: 1.61 m (5 ft 3 in)
- Position: Forward

Senior career*
Years	Team	Apps	(Gls)
2005–2011	Rivers Angels		
2011–2014	Unia Racibórz		(43)
2014–2015	Gintra Universitetas		
2015	Bobruichanka	9	(4)
2016	Vllaznia		
2017	Rouen		
2018	Estrellas de E'Waiso Ipola		
2018-2023	E Waiso Ipola		

International career
2006–2018	Equatorial Guinea		(13)
- * Club domestic league appearances and goals as of 24 November 2018

Gloria Chinasa Okoro (born 8 December 1987) is a former footballer who plays as a forward. Born and raised in Nigeria to Nigerian parents, she capped for the Equatorial Guinea women's national team.

== Club career ==
Chinasa was born and raised in Nigeria. She began her career in Port Harcourt-based club Rivers Angels. In 2005, she played a match against an Equatorial Guinean club and scored three goals. After that, she accepted a proposal to play for the Equatorial Guinea women's national team.

Chinasa played the 2011 World Cup, where she was a starting player in the 3–2 loss to Australia.

Following the World Cup, Chinasa signed for Ekstraliga Kobiet champions Unia Racibórz. She scored the team's only goal in the 2011–12 Champions League qualifying stage match against Pallokerho-35.

On 28 October 2006, Chinasa scored the first goal in history for Equatorial Guinea on African Women's Championship. She also became African Champion in tournaments held in 2008 and 2012.

== Career statistics ==
Scores and results list Equatorial Guinea's goal tally first

No.	Date	Venue	Opponent	Score	Result	Competition
1	28 October 2006	Oleh, Delta, Nigeria	Nigeria	1–2	2–4	2006 African Women's Championship
2	18 November 2008	Estadio de Malabo, Malabo, Equatorial Guinea	Congo	2–1	5–2	2008 African Women's Championship
3	21 November 2008	Estadio de Malabo, Malabo, Equatorial Guinea	Mali	1–0	2–1	2008 African Women's Championship
4	23 May 2010	Sam Nujoma Stadium, Windhoek, Namibia	Namibia	5–1	5–1	2010 African Women's Championship qualification
5	5 November 2010	Sinaba Stadium, Daveyton, South Africa	Algeria	1–0	1–0	2010 African Women's Championship
6	8 November 2010	Sinaba Stadium, Daveyton, South Africa	Ghana	3–1	3–1	2010 African Women's Championship
7	28 October 2012	Estadio de Malabo, Malabo, Equatorial Guinea	South Africa	1–0	1–0	2012 African Women's Championship
8	31 October 2012	Estadio de Malabo, Malabo, Equatorial Guinea	DR Congo	3–0	6–0	2012 African Women's Championship
9	7 November 2012	Estadio de Malabo, Malabo, Equatorial Guinea	Cameroon	1–0	2–0	2012 African Women's Championship
10	11 November 2012	Estadio de Malabo, Malabo, Equatorial Guinea	South Africa	1–0	4–0	2012 African Women's Championship
11	11 November 2012	Estadio de Malabo, Malabo, Equatorial Guinea	South Africa	4–0	4–0	2012 African Women's Championship
12	18 July 2015	National Stadium, Abuja, Nigeria	Nigeria	1–1	1–1	2015 CAF Women's Olympic Qualifying Tournament
13	9 June 2018	Estadio de Malabo, Malabo, Equatorial Guinea	Kenya	1–0	2–0	2018 Africa Women Cup of Nations qualification

== Honours ==
Unia Racibórz

- Ekstraliga: 2011–12, 2012–13
- Polish Cup: 2011–12

Estrellas de E'Waiso Ipola

- Liga Nacional de Fútbol Femenino: 2018

Equatorial Guinea

- Africa Women Cup of Nations: 2008, 2012

Individual

- Ekstraliga top scorer: 2011–12, 2012–13
- Polish Cup top scorer: 2012–13
