= 2012 CAF Women's Olympic qualifying tournament =

2011 CAF Women's Olympic Qualifying Tournament
Tournament details
- Dates: -
- Teams: (from 1 confederation)

Tournament statistics
- Matches played: -

The CAF Women's Pre-Olympic Tournament determined the two participants representing the African continent in Football at the 2012 Summer Olympics. The competition was played as knockout tournament of four rounds.

== Qualification ==
=== First round ===
First leg played on October 2, second leg played on October 23, 2010.

Team 1	Agg.	Team 2	1st leg	2nd leg
Botswana	2–6	Zambia	1–4	1–2

2 October 2010

Botswana	1–4	Zambia

Lobatse Stadium, Lobatse
23 October 2010

Zambia	2–1	Botswana

Nkoloma Stadium, Lusaka

=== Second round ===
The first leg was played on January 15, 2011, second leg on January 29, 2011. The first leg of Guinea v Ghana was played on January 16, 2011. The second leg of Ethiopia v Democratic Republic of Congo was played on January 30, 2011.

Team 1	Agg.	Team 2	1st leg	2nd leg
Gabon	w/o	Equatorial Guinea		
Angola	2–2 (a)	Namibia	2–2	0–0
Congo	w/o	Nigeria		
Cameroon	6–0	Mali	5–0	1–0
Guinea	1–7	Ghana	1–2	0–5
DR Congo	0–3	Ethiopia	0–0	0–3
Morocco	1–3	Tunisia	0–3	1–0
Zambia	1–5	South Africa	1–2	0–3

Gabon	Cancelled	Equatorial Guinea

Equatorial Guinea won on walkover.

15 January 2011

Morocco	0–3	Tunisia
	Report	Chebbi 3'; Houij 21'; Mlayeh 62'

Stade El Abdi, El Jadida
29 January 2011

Tunisia	0 – 1	Morocco
		Bouharat

Tunisia won 3–1 on aggregate.

=== Third round ===
The first leg was played on 1–3 April, second leg on 15–17 April.

Team 1	Agg.	Team 2	1st leg	2nd leg
Ethiopia	2–2 (a)	Ghana	1–0	1–2
Cameroon	0–2^{1}	Equatorial Guinea	0–0	0–2
Nigeria	9–0	Namibia	7–0	2–0
South Africa	1–1 (6–5 p)	Tunisia	1–0	0–1

2 April 2011
15:30 UTC+1

Cameroon	0–0	Equatorial Guinea
	Report

Ahmadou Ahidjo Stadium, Yaoundé, Cameroon
Attendance: 5,000
Referee: Kankou Coulibaly (Mali)
17 April 2011

Equatorial Guinea	2–0	Cameroon
Añonma 12'; Jade 58'

^{1} Equatorial Guinea were ejected from the competition for fielding an ineligible player, Jade Boho; Cameroon were advanced to the final round.

2 April 2011
13:00 UTC+2

South Africa	1–0	Tunisia
Matlou 47'	Report

King Zwelithini Stadium, Umlazi, South Africa
17 April 2011

Tunisia	1–0	South Africa
Penalties
	5–6

1–1 on aggregate. South Africa won 6–5 on penalties.

== Final round ==
The two winners qualified for the 2012 Olympic Games.

The first leg was played on 27 August, second leg on 11 September and 22 October.

Team 1	Agg.	Team 2	1st leg	2nd leg
Nigeria	3–3 (3–4 p)	Cameroon	2–1	1–2
South Africa	4–1	Ethiopia	3–0	1–1

27 August 2011
14:00

Nigeria	2–1	Cameroon
Oparanozie 44'; Nkwocha 60' (pen.)	Report (footofeminin)	Iroka 90+2' (o.g.)

National Stadium, Abuja
Referee: Nabikko Ssemmanbo (Uganda)
22 October 2011
15:30

Cameroon	2–1	Nigeria
Zouga 26'; Manie 84' (pen.)	Report; Report (footofeminin)	Nkwocha 78'
Penalties
Onguéné (penalty missed)	4–3	(penalty missed) Iroka; (penalty missed) Ikidi

Ahmadou Ahidjo Stadium, Yaoundé
Referee: Incaf El Harkaoui (Morocco)

27 August 2011
14:00 (15:00 UTC+2)

South Africa	3–0	Ethiopia
Matlou 6', 13', 90+2'	Report; Report (footofeminin)

Orlando Stadium, Soweto
11 September 2011
16:00 (18:00 UTC+3)

Ethiopia	1–1	South Africa
Mesfin 78'	Report (footofeminin)	Nyandeni 47'

National Stadium, Addis Ababa
Attendance: 15,000

== See also ==
- 2012 CAF Men's Pre-Olympic Tournament
