= Janine van Wyk =

South African soccer player (born 1987)

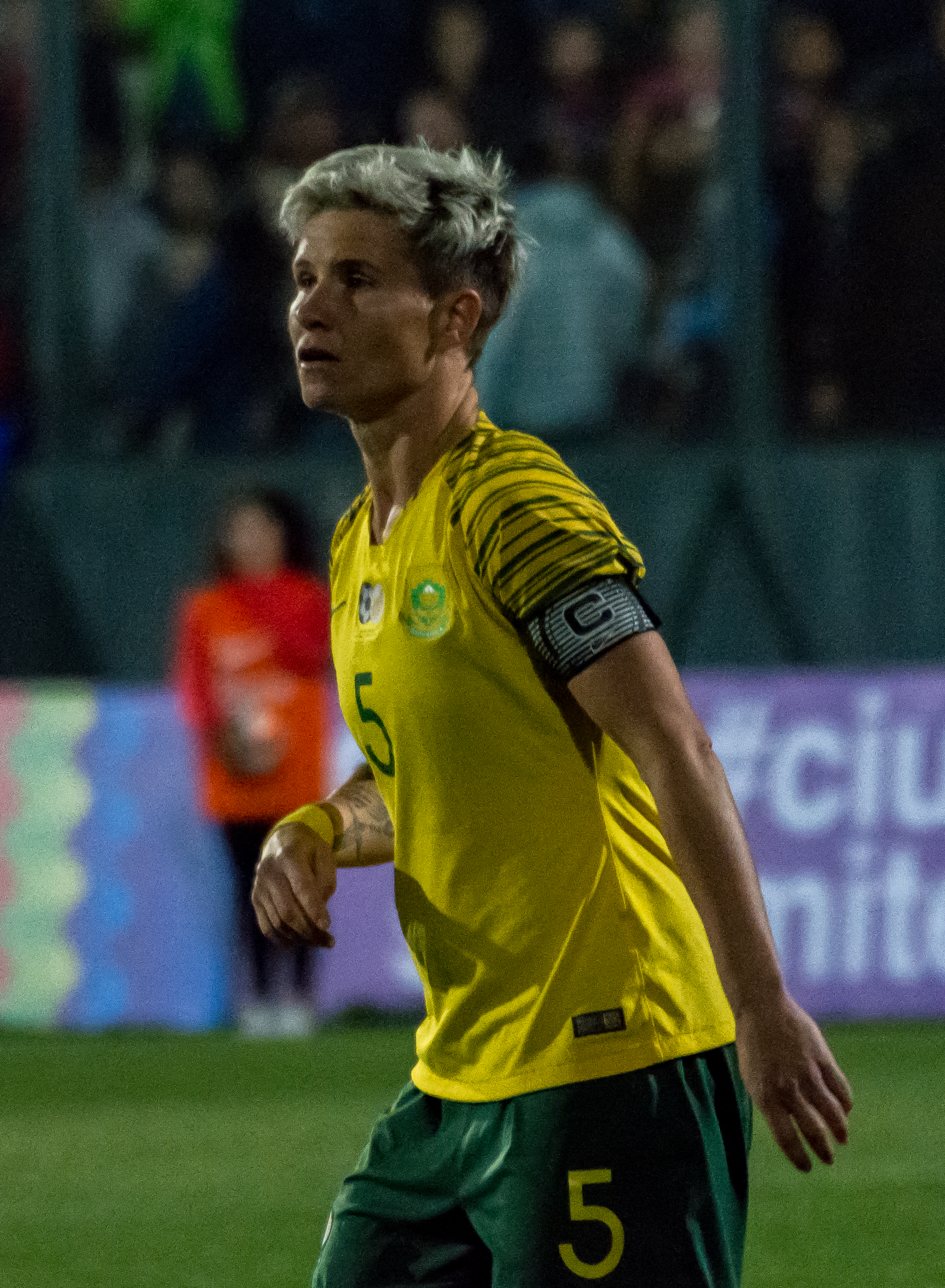
- Van Wyk in October 2018

Personal information
- Full name: Janine van Wyk
- Date of birth: 17 April 1987 (age 39)
- Place of birth: Alberton, South Africa
- Height: 1.64 m (5 ft 5 in)
- Position: Defender

Team information
- Current team: JVW (Head Coach)

Youth career
- Springs Home Sweepers
- Scaw Metals

Senior career*
Years	Team	Apps	(Gls)
- Moroka Swallows
- Palace Super Falcons
2013–2016	JVW		
2017–2018	Houston Dash	41	(0)
2019	JVW	6	(2)
2019–2020	Fortuna Hjørring	0	(0)
2020–2021	Glasgow City	3	(1)
2021-2022	JVW		
2022-2023	Ergotelis		
2023	JVW		

International career
2005–2023	South Africa	185	(12)

Managerial career
- 2016: JVW (player-coach)
- 2023-2024: JVW (assistant)
- 2025-: JVW
Medal record
Representing South Africa
Women's Africa Cup of Nations
Third place	2006 Nigeria
Second place	2008 Equatorial Guinea
Third place	2010 South Africa
Second place	2012 Equatorial Guinea
Second place	2018 Ghana
First place	2022 Morocco
- * Club domestic league appearances and goals as of 23:00, 22 March 2021 (UTC)

Janine van Wyk (Afrikaans: [jɑˈnin fan ˈvəik]; born 17 April 1987) is a former South African professional soccer defender, coach, and owner of JVW F.C., a club she founded and bears her name. Van Wyk was the captain of the South African women's national team, has the most international caps among African women's national teams with 185 and was the first South African ever to play in the U.S. National Women's Soccer League.

== Personal life ==
Van Wyk was born in Alberton to Dannie and Gwen van Wyk. She grew up in Germiston and started playing soccer at the age of 6, attending Hoërskool Alberton, an Afrikaans medium school that did not play soccer, along the way. Her first team was the Springs Home Sweepers in KwaThema. She came out at aged 15. In 2025 she and partner Julia Molin announced their pregnancy. The couple welcomed their son named Reece Mikael van Wyk on 22 June.

== Club career ==
A few years later, Van Wyk joined the Moroka Swallows and later, the Palace Super Falcons from Thembisa, where she was part of a team that won three consecutive league titles. Van Wyk called her time with the Super Falcons "memorable", and said that in the three league victories they were "untouchable". She then founded her own club, named JVW F.C. She previously served as player-coach for the club. Fans of football have nicknamed her "Booth".

On 21 December 2016, she signed with the Houston Dash in the National Women's Soccer League. In 2017 she made 17 appearances for the Dash. Van Wyk returned to Houston for the 2018 NWSL season, she appeared in 20 games. On 1 October 2018 van Wyk was waived by the Houston Dash and placed on re-entry waivers but her rights were not claimed by another team.

In August 2019, she signed for Danish club Fortuna Hjorring. After a knee injury during a training session and returning to South Africa, on 14 January 2020, van Wyk announced that she and Fortuna Hjorring had agreed to terminate her contract so she could focus on rehabilitation.

Van Wyk returned to Europe in July 2020 when she signed for Scottish Women's Premier League (SWPL) club Glasgow City. After making one appearance in a UEFA Women's Champions League match against VfL Wolfsburg, her SWPL debut was delayed for several months due to a combination of a knee injury and the suspension of the league during the COVID-19 pandemic.

== International career ==
Van Wyk made her national team debut in 2005 against Nigeria in the African Women's Championship. Van Wyk scored a stunning free kick when Banyana recorded their first ever win over Nigeria since the women's national team was formed in 1993. Van Wyk scored the only goal of that match, with Banyana knocking Nigeria out of the 2012 African Women's Championship. She was a member of the South African team who played at the 2012 Summer Olympics in London, United Kingdom. She said she was proud to represent her country at an Olympic Games, despite the team being knocked out in the first round.

Van Wyk played her 100th cap for South Africa against Namibia, winning 2–0 in August 2014. At the time, she was the second most capped South African women's player as her teammate Portia Modise won her 110th cap in the same match.

On 28 March 2016, she became South Africa's most capped player (male or female) when she made her 125th appearance against Cameroon. On 18 September 2018, she earned her 150th cap for South Africa. Van Wyk became the first Captain to lead her team to a Women's World Cup Appearance, as well as the first Captain in South Africa's history to lead a South African Team at the 2019 Women's World Cup. Van Wyk captained the Banyana Banyana to their first WAFCON victory in 2022, where they defeated hosts Morocco 2–1 in the final despite Van Wyk not starting the match. Van Wyk played her final match for South Africa on 4 December 2023, helping them secure WAFCON qualification in a 2–0 home victory over Burkina Faso.

=== International goals ===
No.	Date	Venue	Opponent	Score	Result	Competition
1.	15 July 2009	Olympisch Stadion, Amsterdam, Netherlands	Switzerland	3–1	3–2	Friendly
2.	4 November 2010	Sinaba Stadium, Daveyton, South Africa	Nigeria	1–2	1–2	2010 African Women's Championship
3.	7 November 2012	Nkoantoma Stadium, Bata, Equatorial Guinea	Nigeria	1–0	1–0	2012 African Women's Championship
4.	20 October 2021	Estádio do Zimpeto, Maputo, Mozambique	Mozambique	4–0	7–0	2022 Women's Africa Cup of Nations qualification

== JVW ==
Van Wyk founded a football club JVW in 2013 "with the intention to focus on the development of the female football player whilst providing a platform for them to reach higher levels in the sport. Starting with only one team in 2013 that participated in the Sasol League, JVW FC has grown tremendously in the past years developing young female athletes to now having Five teams representing the Football Club" The JVW First team won the Gauteng Sasol League in 2016, where Van Wyk served as a Player-coach, and reached the Sasol League National Championship final where they ultimately lost 1–0 to Bloemfontein Celtic Ladies. A couple years later in 2019 JVW FC won the Gauteng Sasol League once again and became the National Champions beating Limpopo representatives Maindies Ladies 2–0 in the final and booked their place in the recently launched (2019) National Women's League.

== Honours ==
Glasgow City

- Scottish Women's Premier League: 2020–21

South Africa

- Women's Africa Cup of Nations: 2022, runner-up: 2008, 2012, 2018; third place: 2006, 2010

Individual

- South African Football Association Best Female Player: 2010
- COSAFA Women's Championship Player of the Tournament: 2011
- Ekurhuleni Sports Awards Ekurhuleni Sports Woman of the Year: 2012
- Gauteng Sports Awards Sports Personality of the Year: 2015
- IFFHS CAF Women's Team of the Decade: 2011–2020
- IFFHS All-time Africa Women's Dream Team: 2021
