= Junior Khanye =

South African soccer player

Personal information
- Full name: Junior Thabo Khanye
- Date of birth: 18 June 1985 (age 41)
- Place of birth: Daveyton, South Africa
- Position: Winger

Youth career
- Kaizer Chiefs

Senior career*
Years	Team	Apps	(Gls)
- Kaizer Chiefs
- Platinum Stars
2008–2009	Maritzburg United		
2009–2011	United FC		
2013–2014	Malanti Chiefs		

International career
2005	South Africa U20	22	
	South Africa U23	15	
	South Africa	1	(0)
- * Club domestic league appearances and goals

Junior Thabo Khanye (born 18 June 1985) is a South African former soccer player who played for Malanti Chiefs, Kaizer Chiefs, Maritzburg United and Platinum Stars.

== Career ==
=== Club career ===
Khanye formerly played for Kaizer Chiefs and Platinum Stars. He signed for Maritzburg United in August 2008.

=== International career ===
Khanye has competed at the Toulon tournament with the South Africa Under-20 side. He played at the 2005 COSAFA Cup, and has also earned one cap for the South African national side.
