= Jolie Tuzolana =

DR Congolese footballer

Personal information
- Full name: Jolie Tuzolana Diasilua
- Date of birth: 6 April 1986 (age 40)
- Position: Forward

Senior career*
Years	Team	Apps	(Gls)
- La Source Brazzaville
- Force Terrestre

International career^{‡}
2006	DR Congo	3+	(0+)
- * Club domestic league appearances and goals ‡ National team caps and goals as of 3 November 2012.

Jolie Tuzolana Diasilua (born 6 April 1986), known as Jolie Tuzolana, is a DR Congolese footballer who plays as a forward. She has been a member of the DR Congo women's national team.

== Club career ==
Tuzolana has played for La Source Brazzaville in the Republic of the Congo and for Force Terrestre in the Democratic Republic of the Congo.

== International career ==
Tuzolana capped for the DR Congo at senior level during the 2006 African Women's Championship. She also attended the 2012 edition.

== See also ==
- List of Democratic Republic of the Congo women's international footballers
