= Aicha Konate =

Malian footballer (born 1984)

Personal information
- Date of birth: 12 August 1984 (age 42)

Senior career*
Years	Team	Apps	(Gls)
- Super Lionnes

International career
- Mali
- * Club domestic league appearances and goals

Aicha Konate (born 12 August 1984) is a Malian footballer. She has been a member of the Mali women's national team.

== International career ==
Konate capped for Mali at senior level during the 2006 African Women's Championship.
