= Ngozi Ebere =

Nigerian footballer (born 1991)

Personal information
- Full name: Ngozi Ebere
- Date of birth: 5 August 1991 (age 35)
- Place of birth: Port Harcourt, Rivers State, Nigeria
- Height: 1.75 m (5 ft 9 in)
- Position: Defender

Senior career*
Years	Team	Apps	(Gls)
?–2015	Rivers Angels		
2015–2017	Paris Saint-Germain	6	(0)
2017–2019	Barcelona FA	25	(7)
2019	Arna-Bjørnar	15	(2)

International career^{‡}
2010	Nigeria U20	2	(0)
2015–	Nigeria	20	(1)
- * Club domestic league appearances and goals as of 1 December 2019 ‡ National team caps and goals as of 17 June 2015

Ngozi Ebere (born 5 August 1991) is a Nigerian footballer who plays as a defender for the Nigeria women's national team. She was a member of the Rivers Angels who won the Nigerian domestic double in 2014, and the Nigerian national women's team who won the 2014 African Women's Championship.

== Career ==
=== Club ===
In 2014, Ngozi Ebere was part of the Nigerian domestic team Rivers Angels who won the Nigerian Women Football League and Nigeria Federation Cup double. During the course of the season, Ebere scored seven goals including the third and final goal in the final match of the season in the 3–1 victory over Sunshine Queens.

Ebere was signed by the French team Paris Saint-Germain in September 2015 on a two-year contract. She said at the time, "I am here to give the best of myself and to win trophies, I am very motivated by this new challenge that awaits me here in Paris. It’s a dream come true." She made her debut in a Division 1 Féminine match against Olympique Lyonnais on 27 September 2015. Two months later, she was placed on the five person shortlist for African Women's Footballer of the Year; she suggested that this nomination came as a result of her recent performances. During the course of her first season, she played in eight matches; six in the Division 1 Féminine and two in the Coupe de France Féminine.

The 2017–19 seasons she played in Cyprus at Barcelona FA, before moving on to the Norwegian club Arna-Bjørnar.

=== International ===
Ebere was included in the Nigeria women's national football team at the African Women's Championship in 2012; the title winning team of 2014, and the squad at the 2015 FIFA Women's World Cup.

== Honours ==
=== Club ===
Rivers Angels

- Nigerian Women Football League (1): 2014
- Nigeria Federation Cup (1): 2014

=== International ===
Nigeria

- African Women's Championship (2): 2014, 2016
