= 2012 African Women's Championship =

Copa Africana de Naciones femenina 2012 Coupe d'Afrique des Nations féminine 2012 Copa das Nações Africanas feminina 2012

Tournament details
- Host country: Equatorial Guinea
- Dates: 28 October – 11 November
- Teams: 8
- Venues: 2 (in 2 host cities)

Final positions
- Champions: Equatorial Guinea (2nd title)
- Runners-up: South Africa
- Third place: Cameroon
- Fourth place: Nigeria

Tournament statistics
- Matches played: 16
- Goals scored: 47 (2.94 per match)
- Top scorer(s): (Equatorial Guinea) Genoveva Añonman (6 goals)

The 2012 African Women's Championship was a football competition, which was organized by the Confederation of African Football (CAF). The final tournament was held in from 28 October to 11 November in Equatorial Guinea.

== Qualification ==
A total of 24 national teams entered qualification which was held over two rounds. In the preliminary round, 20 nations were drawn in pairs. The ten winners joined the four semifinalists of the 2010 Women's African Football Championship in the first round, where the seven winners qualified for the finals.

Qualified teams

- Cameroon
- DR Congo
- Equatorial Guinea
- Ethiopia
- Ivory Coast
- Nigeria
- Senegal
- South Africa

== Group stage ==
The seven first round winners will join the hosts in the finals. Equatorial Guinea was put in Group A as hosts, while Nigeria as winners of 2010 edition was put into Group B. The draw was held on 17 July 2012.

=== Tiebreakers ===
If two or more teams in the group stage are tied on points tie-breakers are in order:

1. Points in head-to-head matches between tied teams
2. Goal difference in head-to-head matches between tied teams
3. Goals scored in head-to-head matches between tied teams
4. Goal difference in all group matches
5. Goals scored in all group matches
6. Fair play conduct
7. Drawing of lots

=== Group A ===
| Pos | Team | Pld | W | D | L | GF | GA | GD | Pts | Qualification |
|---|---|---|---|---|---|---|---|---|---|---|
| 1 | Equatorial Guinea (H) | 3 | 3 | 0 | 0 | 12 | 0 | +12 | 9 | Advance to knockout stage |
| 2 | South Africa | 3 | 2 | 0 | 1 | 5 | 2 | +3 | 6 | Advance to knockout stage |
| 3 | DR Congo | 3 | 1 | 0 | 2 | 2 | 10 | −8 | 3 | |
| 4 | Senegal | 3 | 0 | 0 | 3 | 0 | 7 | −7 | 0 | |

Rules for classification: Group stage tiebreakers
(H) Hosts
28 October 2012
14:30

| Equatorial Guinea | 1–0 | South Africa |
|---|---|---|
| Chinasa 33' | Report |

Estadio de Malabo, Malabo
Referee: Therese Sagno (Guinea)
28 October 2012
17:30

| Senegal | 0–1 | DR Congo |
|---|---|---|
| | Report | Nona 74' (pen.) |

Estadio de Malabo, Malabo
Referee: Amegee Aissatta (Togo)

31 October 2012
14:30

| South Africa | 1–0 | Senegal |
|---|---|---|
| Mgcoyi 70' | Report |

Estadio de Malabo, Malabo
Referee: Lidya Tafese (Ethiopia)
31 October 2012
17:30

| Equatorial Guinea | 6–0 | DR Congo |
|---|---|---|
| Añonman 25', 66', 73'; Bwadi 39' (o.g.); Chinasa 63'; Jade 86' | Report |

Estadio de Malabo, Malabo
Referee: Christine Ziga (Ghana)

3 November 2012
17:30

| Equatorial Guinea | 5–0 | Senegal |
|---|---|---|
| Jade 5', 14'; Tiga 15'; Jumária 47'; Añonman 72' | Report |

Estadio de Malabo, Malabo
Referee: Grace Msiska (Malawi)
3 November 2012
17:30

| South Africa | 4–1 | DR Congo |
|---|---|---|
| Smeda 3'; Mgcoyi 10', 48', 57' | Report | Tuzolana 88' |

Nkoantoma Stadium, Bata
Referee: Gladys Lingwe (Zambia)

=== Group B ===
| Pos | Team | Pld | W | D | L | GF | GA | GD | Pts | Qualification |
|---|---|---|---|---|---|---|---|---|---|---|
| 1 | Nigeria | 3 | 3 | 0 | 0 | 8 | 2 | +6 | 9 | Advance to knockout stage |
| 2 | Cameroon | 3 | 1 | 1 | 1 | 5 | 3 | +2 | 4 | Advance to knockout stage |
| 3 | Ivory Coast | 3 | 1 | 0 | 2 | 7 | 7 | 0 | 3 | |
| 4 | Ethiopia | 3 | 0 | 1 | 2 | 0 | 8 | −8 | 1 | |

Rules for classification: Group stage tiebreakers
29 October 2012
14:30

| Nigeria | 2–1 | Cameroon |
|---|---|---|
| Ohadugha 45+1'; Nkwocha 86' | Report | Manie 52' (pen.) |

Nkoantoma Stadium, Bata
Referee: Gladys Lengwe (Zambia)
29 October 2012
17:30

| Ivory Coast | 5–0 | Ethiopia |
|---|---|---|
| Nrehy 1', 9', 68'; Gnago 51'; N'Guessan 53' | Report |

Nkoantoma Stadium, Bata
Referee: Kankou Coulibaly (Mali)

1 November 2012
14:30

| Cameroon | 4–1 | Ivory Coast |
|---|---|---|
| Iven 11', 25'; Onguene 62'; Zouga 88' | Report | Nahi 18' |

Nkoantoma Stadium, Bata
Referee: Neama Mohamed Rashad (Egypt)
1 November 2012
17:30

| Ethiopia | 0–3 | Nigeria |
|---|---|---|
| | Report | Sunday 26'; Mbachu 64'; Nkwocha 66' |

Nkoantoma Stadium, Bata
Referee: Maximina Bernardo (Angola)

4 November 2012
17:30

| Nigeria | 3–1 | Ivory Coast |
|---|---|---|
| Chukwudi 9'; Ebere 39'; Mbachu 75' | Report | Nrehy 82' |

Estadio de Malabo, Malabo
Referee: Insaf El Harkaoui (Morocco)
4 November 2012
17:30

| Cameroon | 0–0 | Ethiopia |
|---|---|---|
| | Report |

Nkoantoma Stadium, Bata
Referee: Aisha Nabikko Ssemambo (Uganda)

== Knockout stage ==
=== Bracket ===
Semi-finals
7 November – Malabo
Equatorial Guinea | 2
Cameroon | 0
7 November – Bata
Nigeria | 0
South Africa | 1

Final
11 November – Malabo
Equatorial Guinea | 4
South Africa | 0
Third place play-off
11 November – Malabo
Cameroon | 1
Nigeria | 0

=== Semi-finals ===
7 November 2012
14:30

| Equatorial Guinea | 2–0 | Cameroon |
|---|---|---|
| Chinasa 7'; Añonman 40' | Report |

Estadio de Malabo, Malabo
7 November 2012
17:30

| Nigeria | 0–1 | South Africa |
|---|---|---|
| | Report | van Wyk 23' |

Nkoantoma Stadium, Bata

=== Third place play-off ===
11 November 2012
14:30

| Cameroon | 1–0 | Nigeria |
|---|---|---|
| Enganamouit 31' | Report |

Estadio de Malabo, Malabo

=== Final ===
11 November 2012
17:30

| Equatorial Guinea | 4–0 | South Africa |
|---|---|---|
| Chinasa 43', 72'; Tiga 66'; Añonman 70' | Report |

Estadio de Malabo, Malabo
Attendance: 20 000

== Goalscorers ==
There were 47 goals scored in 16 matches, for an average of 2.94 goals per match.

6 goals

- (Equatorial Guinea) Genoveva Añonman

5 goals

- (Equatorial Guinea) Gloria Chinasa

4 goals

- (Ivory Coast) Ines Nrehy
- (South Africa) Andisiwe Mgcoyi

3 goals

- (Equatorial Guinea) Jade Boho

2 goals

- (Cameroon) Adrienne Iven
- (Equatorial Guinea) Adriana Aparecida Costa
- (Nigeria) Stella Mbachu
- (Nigeria) Perpetua Nkwocha

1 goal

- (Ivory Coast) Jeanine Alexise Gnago
- (Ivory Coast) Ange N'Guessan
- (Ivory Coast) Josée Nahi
- (Cameroon) Christine Manie
- (Cameroon) Gabrielle Onguéné
- (Cameroon) Gaëlle Enganamouit
- (Cameroon) Francine Zouga
- (Democratic Republic of the Congo) Lucie Mengi Nona
- (Democratic Republic of the Congo) Jolie Tuzolana
- (Equatorial Guinea) Jumária Barbosa de Santana
- (Nigeria) Ogonna Chukwudi
- (Nigeria) Ngozi Ebere
- (Nigeria) Martina Ohadugha
- (Nigeria) Esther Sunday
- (South Africa) Leandra Smeda
- (South Africa) Janine van Wyk

1 own goal

- (Democratic Republic of the Congo) Bwadi Mwalutshe (against Equatorial Guinea)
