= Makhulong Stadium =

Sports venue in South Africa

New Peter Mokaba Stadium
- Interactive map of New Peter Mokaba Stadium
- Location: [Limpopo], Gauteng, South Africa
- Capacity: 10,000

Construction
- Renovated: R38 million
- Architect: ACG Architects

Tenant
- Sekhukhune United

The Makhulong Stadium (sometimes referred to as Tembisa Stadium) is a South African multi-sports stadium in Tembisa, a township of Ekurhuleni. In 2009, it underwent a R38 million renovation and was brought up to Premier Soccer League standards.

In June 2010 a crowd crush of spectators before an exhibition game between the Nigeria and North Korea national football teams injured 16 people.

In March 2020, the Ekurhuleni municipality announced that it would renovate the stadium for Highlands Park F.C.
