= Estadio de Bata =

Football stadium in Bata, Equatorial Guinea

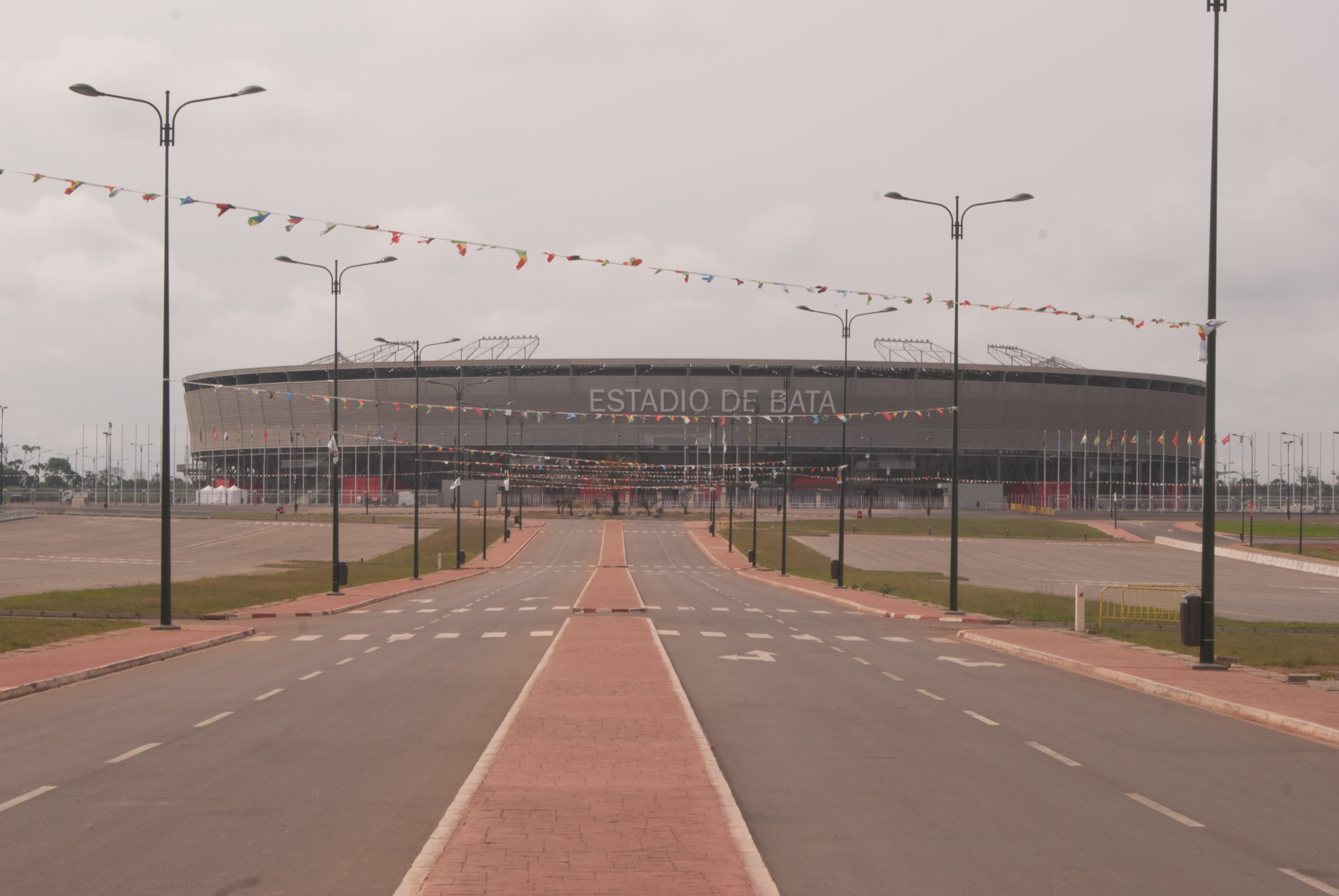
- Interactive map of Estadio de Bata
- Location: Bata, Equatorial Guinea
- Coordinates: 01°49′12″N 09°47′15″E
- Capacity: 35,700

Construction
- Built: 2007
- Renovated: 2011
- General contractor: Covec

Tenant
- Equatorial Guinea national football team

Estadio de Bata is a multi-use stadium in Bata, Equatorial Guinea. The stadium was built by the Chinese contractor Covec. It was completed in 2007 with a capacity of 22,000 people in a single tier pre-cast concrete structure. It was a venue for the 2008 Women's African Football Championship. It was expanded in 2011 with a new steel substructure upper tier to a 35,000 capacity as one of the host stadiums for the 2012 Africa Cup of Nations including the opening ceremony and semi-final matches. The stadium is located about 5 kilometers from the coast and adjacent to a sport complex currently under construction which features an indoor sports hall, covered swimming pool, hotel and most main sporting codes. Bata Stadium is the largest stadium in Equatorial Guinea's largest city.

== Design ==
The stadium is built around a football field with running track. The stadium platform is a square centre section with semi-circular ends. The first phase was a concrete lower tier with 21 rows and a steel cantilever roof over the east and west stands. The same contractor also constructed stadiums with the same basic plan configuration at Mongomo and at Ebebiyin but with fewer rows.

== Expansion ==
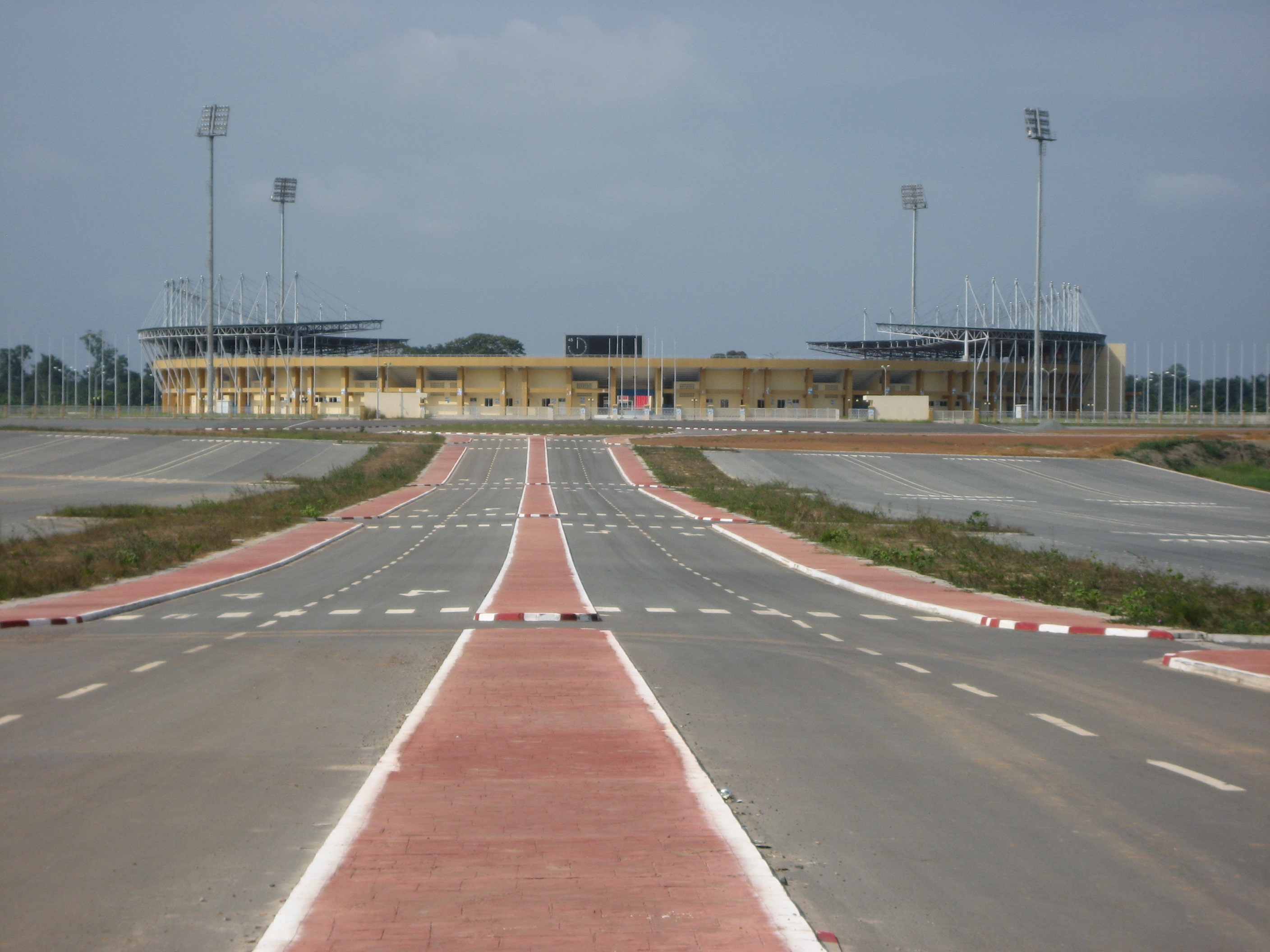
Bata Stadium in 2010

In 2011, Bouygues were appointed as contractors to expand the seating capacity to 35,000 for hosting the 2012 Africa Cup of Nations tournament semi-final. The expansion was done in a very short time with a new steel structure upper tier with 13 rows of seats and a new continuous cantilever roof.

== 2015 Africa Cup of Nations ==
On 14 November 2014 CAF announced that the oil-rich Equatorial Guinea would be the last-minute alternate hosts for the 2015 Africa Cup of Nations tournament. This happened after Morocco insisted that CAF must postpone the event due to concerns related to the 2014 Ebola outbreak in West Africa. CAF responded by expelling Morocco and withdrawing them as tournament hosts. Bata Stadium hosted four matches, including the opening game between Equatorial Guinea and the Republic of the Congo and the final match.

Preceded by FNB Stadium; Johannesburg	African Cup of Nations; Final venue 2015	Succeeded by Stade de l'Amitié; Libreville
