= Christine Manie =

Cameroonian footballer (born 1984)

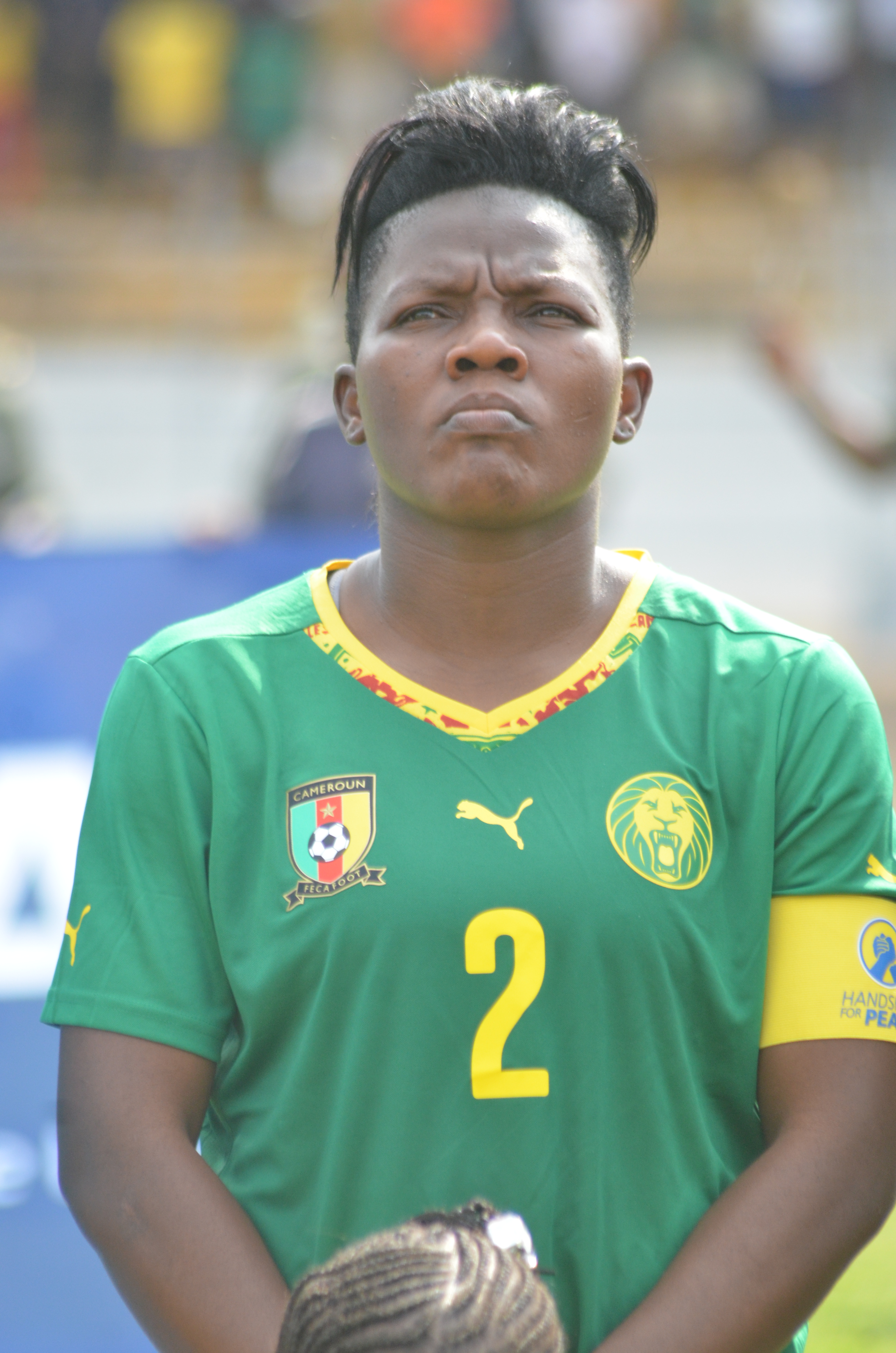

Personal information
- Full name: Christine Patiance Manie
- Date of birth: May 4, 1984 (age 42)
- Place of birth: Yaoundé, Cameroon
- Height: 1.60 m (5 ft 3 in)
- Position: Defender

Team information
- Current team: Bourges FC
- Number: 2

Senior career*
Years	Team	Apps	(Gls)
2005–2009	Canon Yaoundé		
2009–2011	FC Minsk		
2011–2012	CS Negrea Reşiţa		
2012–2016	CFF Olimpia Cluj		
2016–2020	Nancy Lorraine	56	(6)
2020-2023	Yzeure	48	(3)
2023-	Bourges FC	75	(4)

International career^{‡}
2008–2019	Cameroon	63+	(10+)
- * Club domestic league appearances and goals as of 20 Novembre 2026 ‡ National team caps and goals as of 16:24, 23 June 2015 (UTC)

Christine Patiance Manie (born 4 May 1984) is a Cameroonian footballer who plays as a defender for Bourges FC and the Cameroon women's national football team. At the 2014 African Women's Championship, Manie scored an extra-time winner in the semi-final against the Ivory Coast, which brought Cameroon to their first-ever FIFA Women's World Cup.

== Honours ==
FK Minsk

- Belarusian Women's Cup: 2011

CFF Olimpia Cluj

- Romanian Superliga: 2012–13, 2013–14, 2014–15
- Romanian Women's Cup: 2013, 2014, 2015
