= Daveyton =

- Location within Gauteng Location within South Africa Location within Africa
- Coordinates: 26°08′19″S 28°25′30″E
- Country: South Africa
- Province: Gauteng
- Municipality: Ekurhuleni

Area
  - Total: 14.45 km^{2} (5.58 sq mi)
- Elevation: 1,627 m (5,338 ft)

Population (2011)
  - Total: 127,967
  - Density: 8,856/km^{2} (22,940/sq mi)

Racial makeup (2011)
  - Black African: 98.5%
  - Coloured: 0.3%
  - Indian/Asian: 0.3%
  - White: 0.1%
  - Other: 0.8%

First languages (2011)
  - Zulu: 37.2%
  - Northern Sotho: 13.3%
  - Xhosa: 11.8%
  - Sotho: 10.5%
  - Other: 27.2%
- Time zone: UTC+2 (SAST)
- Postal code (street): 1520
- PO box: 1507
- Area code: 011

Daveyton is a township in the Ekurhuleni Metropolitan Municipality of Gauteng in South Africa. It borders Etwatwa to the north-east, Springs to the south and Benoni to the south-west. It is approximately 18 kilometres north-east of Benoni and 45 kilometers east of Johannesburg.

== History ==
Daveyton was established in 1952, and named after William Albert Davey (1900-1977), the Mayor of Benoni from 1951 to 1953. Daveyton achieved municipal status in 1983.

Numerous civic and youth organizations operated in the township since 1980, such as the East Rand Peoples Organisation, the Daveyton Students Congress Peoples Party, the Sinaba Party, Daveyton Peoples Party, and the Daveyton Youth Council. The East Rand Peoples Party and Daveyton Students Congress were affiliates of the United Democratic Front. Chris Hani led his last March from Daveyton to Modderbee Prison.

Owing to Daveyton's strategic infrastructure - notably affordable passenger rail services connecting to key economic hubs such as Benoni, Boksburg, Germiston and the Johannesburg CBD, alongside the presence of a UNISA campus and a TVET college - the township has experienced high levels of inward migration. According to the City of Ekurhuleni, this has resulted in population growth from 127,967 in 2011 to 192,200 in 2025.

== Culture and lifestyle ==
Soccer is the most popular sporting code in the township. Therefore, multiple tournaments are held during the festive season. Namely, the Ibhola Lethu tournament at Mabuya ground, organised by the community, and the Pollen Festive Games, organised by South African soccer legend Pollen Ndlanya. It is also the birthplace of some of the country's professional soccer players, like Jabu Pule, Junior Khanye and Clement Mazibuko, Katlego Mashego, Musa Nyatama and Xolani Mdaki. Daveyton also has a soccer team, Benoni United FC.

Other notable establishments in the area are the Ekurhuleni Metro Police Department offices, the Ekurhuleni Customer Care Centre, the Daveyton and Mokoka libraries, as well as the Ekurhuleni East College, Daveyton Campus (formerly known as Isidingo College). It also boast one of the biggest arts centre in Ekurhuleni, the old brewery which was converted into an art centre.

With the approval of the Provincial Government in the 1970s, Daveyton began using vintage Chevrolet Kommando and Constantia vehicles as modes of public transportation. They are commonly called amaPhela ('cockroaches') because they were so common in the streets of Daveyton. Hence, Daveyton was dubbed the "Chevrolet Township of South Africa". Though the use of these vehicles has been superseded by the modern, fuel efficient Toyota Avanza, there are still a few classic cars in Daveyton.

== Media ==
- Bopha! is a 1986 play by Percy Mtwa which was later adapted to film. The African-American filmmaker and actor Morgan Freeman directed the film, which also starred Danny Glover. The film was shot in Daveyton.
- Yizo Yizo, an uncompromising television drama series, was set in Daveyton with Davey Secondary being the fictitious Supatsela High School. The show achieved record-breaking audience ratings and cult status amongst South Africa's youth. It was directed by Teboho Mahlatsi and Angus Gibson and produced by Desiree Markgraaff.
- Daveytontv provides daily news in the Township and surrounding areas on Facebook, Youtube, Instagram, and Tik tok. Radiovutta is another platform that gives news about the township

== Infrastructure ==
=== Malls ===
Daveyton mall, Sesfikile Square, Majuteng Square, and Mayfield Square.

=== Higher Education ===
University of South Africa ekurhuleni campus and Ekurhuleni East College

=== Schools ===
Bafo Chiko Primary, Baikagetse Intermediary School, Daveyton Combined School Bhekimfundo Primary School, Davey Secondary School, Daveyton Intermediate School, Dinoto Technical Secondary, Dumehlezi Primary School Enkangala Primary School, Hb Nyathi Secondary School, Hulwazi Secondary School, Inkatha Ka Zulu Primary, Katlego Intermediary School, Kgalema Primary School, Lerutle Primary School, Lesiba Secondary School, Usizolwethu Special School, Letsha Primary School, Mabuya Secondary School, Madingoane Primary School, Matiyotenga Combined, Melodi Primary School, Moshoeshoe Primary School, Ntsikana Primary School, Rivoni Secondary School, Sibonelo Primary School, Siphethu Primary School, Siphumelele Primary School, Sozizwe Primary School, Daveyton Skills School and Unity Secondary School

=== Stadiums ===
- Sinaba Stadium

=== Health care ===
Daveyton main clinic, Daveyton east clinic and Sgodi clinic. Future projects include Daveyton hospital

=== Transport ===
Mini bus taxis, Ekurhuleni Traffic Department Offices and Daveyton to Johannesburg via Germiston Train service (Non-active since 2020 due Nationwide vandalizing of PRASA rail network during the Covid shutdowns but is in PRASA Rehabilitation programs)

=== Library ===
Daveyton library and Mokoka library
