= Sinaba Stadium =

Stadium in South Africa

Coordinates: 26°8′33″S 28°25′19″E

Sinaba Stadium is a multi-use stadium in Daveyton, South Africa. It is currently used mostly for football matches and was the home ground of Benoni Premier United. The stadium holds 15,000 people. It underwent a major upgrade during 2009, as it had been chosen as a training facility during the 2010 FIFA world cup in South Africa.

International matches cannot be held at the stadium since it does not meet FIFA regulations. An evaluation of the stadium's structural soundness led to the decision to demolish it. Over time, the Benoni North Local Football Association has bemoaned the facility for its inadequate upkeep and administration. SuperSport United looked at Sinaba Stadium as a potential replacement for Lucas Moripe Stadium, which was deemed too large for their requirements. Numerous football games have taken place in the stadium, including the 2010 opening game between South Africa and Tanzania at the seventh African Women's Championship.
