= DR Congo women's national football team results =

This article lists the results and fixtures for the DR Congo women's national football team.

Nicknamed "Les Léopards dames", derived from the men's team moniker "Les Léopards", the team represents the Democratic Republic of the Congo in international women's association football. It is governed by the Congolese Association Football Federation (FECOFA) and is a member of the Confederation of African Football (CAF).

The team made its international debut in 1998 during the qualification phase for the African Women's Championship. Namibia withdrew from the competition, granting DR Congo automatic qualification for the final tournament. In their opening match, the team recorded a 4–1 victory over Egypt, marking both their first international win and first tournament victory. DR Congo went on to finish third in the competition, which remains their best result to date. As of 12 June 2025, the team is ranked 109th in the FIFA Women's World Ranking.

== Record per opponent ==
Key

Positive balance (more wins than losses)
Neutral balance (as many wins as losses)
Negative balance (more losses than wins)

The following table shows DR Congo's all-time official international record per opponent:

Opponent	Pld	W	D	L	GF	GA	GD	PPG	Confederation	Last
Algeria	2	1	0	1	5	3	+2	1.50	CAF	2025
Angola	2	1	0	1	1	1	±0	1.50	CAF	2002
Benin	1	2	0	0	4	2	+2	3.00	CAF	2023
Botswana	4	3	1	0	9	2	+7	2.50	CAF	2025
Cameroon	8	1	3	4	6	15	−9	0.75	CAF	2019
Central African Republic	1	1	0	0	4	0	+4	3.00	CAF	2020
Chad	1	1	0	0	4	2	+2	3.00	CAF	2020
Congo	3	1	1	1	6	5	+1	1.33	CAF	2021
Egypt	1	1	0	0	4	1	+3	3.00	CAF	1998
Equatorial Guinea	7	1	3	3	5	14	−9	0.86	CAF	2023
Ethiopia	2	0	1	1	0	3	−3	0.50	CAF	2011
Gabon	1	0	1	0	0	0	±0	1.00	CAF	2020
Ghana	6	0	0	6	4	14	−10	0.00	CAF	2007
Mali	2	0	1	1	2	3	−1	0.50	CAF	2006
Morocco	4	0	1	3	5	9	−4	0.25	CAF	2025
Namibia	2	1	1	0	8	5	+3	2.00	CAF	2007
Nigeria	1	0	0	1	0	6	−6	0.00	CAF	1998
Rwanda	1	0	1	0	1	1	±0	1.00	CAF	2019
Senegal	6	2	0	4	4	9	−5	1.00	CAF	2025
South Africa	4	0	1	3	2	11	−9	0.25	CAF	2024
Tanzania	4	1	1	2	5	7	−2	1.00	CAF	2024
Uganda	4	1	1	2	7	6	+1	1.00	CAF	2024
Zambia	3	2	0	1	6	3	+3	2.00	CAF	2025
Total	71	20	17	34	92	122	−30	1.08	—	

Last update : Zambia v DR Congo, 12 July 2025

== Results ==
This section details the all-time results of the DR Congo women's national team against other national teams that are members of FIFA.

=== 1998 ===
17 October African Championship 1998	DR Congo	4–1	Egypt	Kaduna, Nigeria

20 October African Championship 1998	Nigeria	6–0	DR Congo	Kaduna, Nigeria

23 October African Championship 1998	Morocco	0–0	DR Congo	Kaduna, Nigeria

27 October African Championship 1998 SF	Ghana	4–1	DR Congo	Kaduna, Nigeria

30 October African Championship 1998 3rd	Cameroon	3–3 (a.e.t.) (1–3 p)	DR Congo	Kaduna, Nigeria

=== 2002 ===
22 September African Championship 2002 qualifying	Angola	1–0	DR Congo	Lubango, Angola

11 October African Championship 2002 qualifying	DR Congo	1–0 (a.e.t.) (4–5 p)	Angola	Kinshasa

=== 2003 ===
4 October 2003 All-Africa Games	DR Congo	5–2	Algeria	Kaduna, Nigeria

7 October 2003 All-Africa Games	Mali	0–0	DR Congo	Kaduna, Nigeria

10 October 2003 All-Africa Games	DR Congo	0–4	South Africa	Kaduna, Nigeria

2004 Olympic Games qualifying	Ghana	2–0	DR Congo	Ghana

2004 Olympic Games qualifying	DR Congo	1–2	Ghana	Kinshasa

=== 2006 ===
11 March African Championship 2006 qualifying	DR Congo	3–0	Zambia	Lubumbashi

25 March African Championship 2006 qualifying	Zambia	2–3	DR Congo	Chingola, Zambia

23 July African Championship 2006 qualifying	DR Congo	3–0	Senegal	Kinshasa

5 August African Championship 2006 qualifying	Senegal	2–0	DR Congo	Dakar, Senegal

29 October African Championship 2006	Cameroon	1–1	DR Congo	Ughelli, Nigeria

1 November African Championship 2006	DR Congo	2–3	Mali	Oghara, Nigeria

4 November African Championship 2006	DR Congo	1–3	Ghana	Ughelli, Nigeria

=== 2007 ===
22 January Friendly	Cameroon	3–0	DR Congo	Cameroon

17 February 2008 Olympic Games qualifying	Namibia	3–3	DR Congo	Namibia

10 March 2008 Olympic Games qualifying	DR Congo	5–2	Namibia	Kinshasa
				Stadium: Stade des Martyrs

1 June 2008 Olympic Games qualifying	Ghana	3–1	DR Congo	Ghana

15 June 2008 Olympic Games qualifying	DR Congo	0–1	Ghana	Kinshasa
				Stadium: Stade des Martyrs

=== 2008 ===
24 February African Championship 2008 qualifying	Congo	4–1	DR Congo	Brazzaville, Congo
		Report	Zuma	Stadium: Stade Alphonse Massemba-Débat

8 March African Championship 2008 qualifying	DR Congo	1–1	Congo	Kinshasa
		Report		Stadium: Stade des Martyrs

=== 2010 ===
7 March African Championship 2010 qualifying	Botswana	0–2	DR Congo	Gaborone, Botswana
		Report	Malembo 11'; Dianteso 17'	Stadium: University of Botswana Stadium; Referee: Gladys Lengwe (Zambia)

19 March African Championship 2010 qualifying	DR Congo	5–2	Botswana	Kinshasa
14:30 UTC+1	Malembo 20', 27'; Nzuzi 24', 28'; Mafuta 88'	Report	Ramasi 21', 55'	Stadium: Stade des Martyrs; Referee: Thérèse Abou'ou (Cameroon)

21 May African Championship 2010 qualifying	DR Congo	0–2	Cameroon	Kinshasa
15:30 UTC+1		Report	Mani 4'; Mbella 35'	Stadium: Stade des Martyrs; Referee: Deidre Mitchell (South Africa)

5 June African Championship 2010 qualifying	Cameroon	3–0	DR Congo	Yaoundé, Cameroon
15:30 UTC+1	Mani 23'; Enganamouit 45'; Onguene 86'	Report		Stadium: Stade Ahmadou Ahidjo; Referee: Agathe Athacou (Ivory Coast)

=== 2011 ===
15 January 2012 Olympic Games qualifying	DR Congo	0–0	Ethiopia	Kinshasa
13:30 UTC+1		Report		Stadium: Stade des Martyrs

30 January 2012 Olympic Games qualifying	Ethiopia	3–0	DR Congo	Addis Ababa, Ethiopia
13:00 UTC+1

=== 2012 ===
14 January African Championship 2012 qualifying	Uganda	1–1	DR Congo	Kampala, Uganda
	Luwedde 19'	Report	Tondo 7'	Stadium: Nakivubo Stadium

28 January African Championship 2012 qualifying	DR Congo	4–0	Uganda	Kinshasa
	Pambani 2'; Malembo 25'; Diantesa 77' (pen.); Tondo 85'	Report		Stadium: Stade des Martyrs

24 June Friendly	Equatorial Guinea	3–0	DR Congo	Malabo, Equatorial Guinea
	Tiga; Jade Boho; Nganda	Report		Stadium: Estadio de Malabo

26 June Friendly	Equatorial Guinea	2–1	DR Congo	Malabo, Equatorial Guinea
	Tiga; Añonman	Report	Ndulu	Stadium: Estadio de Malabo

18 October Friendly	DR Congo	0–0	Cameroon	Kinshasa

28 October African Championship 2012	Senegal	0–1	DR Congo	Malabo, Equatorial Guinea
17:30 UTC+1		Report	Nona 74' (pen.)	Stadium: Estadio de Malabo; Referee: Aissata Amegee (Togo)

31 October African Championship 2012	Equatorial Guinea	6–0	DR Congo	Malabo, Equatorial Guinea
17:30 UTC+1	Añonman 25', 66', 73'; Bwadi 39' (o.g.); Chinasa 63'; Jade 86'	Report		Stadium: Estadio de Malabo; Referee: Christine Ziga (Ghana)

3 November African Championship 2012	South Africa	4–1	DR Congo	Bata, Equatorial Guinea
17:30 UTC+1	Smeda 3'; Mgcoyi 10', 48', 57'	Report	Tuzolana 88'	Stadium: Nkoantoma Stadium; Referee: Gladys Lengwe (Zambia)

=== 2019 ===
26 March Friendly	Rwanda	1–1	DR Congo	Gisenyi, Rwanda
	Iradukunda 73'	Report	Mawete 26'	Stadium: Umuganda Stadium

5 April 2020 Olympic Games qualifying	Tanzania	2–2	DR Congo	Dar es Salaam, Tanzania
16:00 UTC+1	Minja 47'; Rashid 79'	Report	Kasaj 12'; Mfwamba 54'	Stadium: National Stadium

9 April 2020 Olympic Games qualifying	DR Congo	1–0	Tanzania	Kinshasa
16:30 UTC+1	Mfwamba 45'	Report		Stadium: Stade des Martyrs

3 October 2020 Olympic Games qualifying	Cameroon	2–0	DR Congo	Yaoundé, Cameroon
15:30 UTC+1	Meyong 28'; Nchout 30'	Report		Stadium: Stade Ahmadou Ahidjo; Referee: Patience Madu Ndidi (Nigeria)

8 October 2020 Olympic Games qualifying	DR Congo	2–1	Cameroon	Kinshasa
16:00 UTC+1	Diakiese 15'; Kasaj 34'	Report	Nchout 71'	Stadium: Stade des Martyrs

=== 2020 ===
20 February UNIFFAC Cup 2020	Equatorial Guinea	1–1	DR Congo	Ebibeyin, Equatorial Guinea
16:00 UTC+1	Nké 73'	Report	Pambani 80'	Stadium: Estadio de Ebibeyin

22 February UNIFFAC Cup 2020	DR Congo	4–0	Central African Republic	Mongomo, Equatorial Guinea
16:00 UTC+1	Kipoyi (??); Pambani (??); Kasaj (??); Kizinga (??)			Stadium: Estadio de Mongomo

24 February UNIFFAC Cup 2020	DR Congo	4–2	Chad	Mongomo, Equatorial Guinea
18:00 UTC+1	Mfwamba 25', 26'; Kabakaba 40', 50'	Report	Larkingam 55'; Ouamtibaye 80' (pen.)	Stadium: Estadio de Mongomo

26 February UNIFFAC Cup 2020	DR Congo	0–0	Gabon	Ebibeyin, Equatorial Guinea
16:00 UTC+1		Report		Stadium: Estadio de Ebibeyin

28 February UNIFFAC Cup 2020 Final	DR Congo	0–0 (2–4 p)	Equatorial Guinea	Mongomo, Equatorial Guinea
				Stadium: Estadio de Mongomo

=== 2021 ===
25 March Friendly	DR Congo	4–0	Congo	Kinshasa
	Kizinga 24'; Kasaj 34'; Pambani 35'; Mawanda 69'	Report		Stadium: Stade des Martyrs

=== 2023 ===
22 September WAFCON 2024 qualifying	DR Congo	2–1	Benin	Kinshasa
15:30 UTC+1	Pambani 14'; Kabakaba 56'	Report	Gnammi 30'	Stadium: Stade des Martyrs

26 September WAFCON 2024 qualifying	Benin	1–2	DR Congo	Cotonou, Benin
17:00 UTC+1	Gnammi 5'	Report	Kanjinga 31'; Kabakaba 34'	Stadium: Stade de l'Amitié

25 October 2024 Olympic Games qualifying	DR Congo	1–1	South Africa	Kinshasa
15:30 UTC+1	Mfwamba 40'	Report	Kgatlana 48'	Stadium: Stade des Martyrs

30 October 2024 Olympic Games qualifying	South Africa	2–0	DR Congo	Johannesburg, South Africa
14:00 UTC+1	Kgatlana 71', 88'	Report		Stadium: Orlando Stadium

1 December WAFCON 2024 qualifying	Equatorial Guinea	1–1	DR Congo	Malabo, Equatorial Guinea
16:00 UTC+1	Obono 20'	Report	Kabakaba 72'	Stadium: Estadio de Malabo

5 December WAFCON 2024 qualifying	DR Congo	2–1	Equatorial Guinea	Kinshasa
	Kanjinga 55'; Kipoyi 75'	Report	Obono 45'	Stadium: Stade des Martyrs

=== 2024 ===
30 May Friendly	Morocco	2–1	DR Congo	Berkane, Morocco
19:00 UTC+1	Chapelle 71'; Jraïdi 89'	Report	Er-Rmichi 77' (o.g.)	Stadium: Berkane Municipal Stadium

3 June Friendly	Morocco	3–2	DR Congo	Berkane, Morocco
19:00 UTC+1	Jraïdi 39', 43', 73'	Report	Mrabet 3' (o.g.); Kabakaba 90+1'	Stadium: Berkane Municipal Stadium; Referee: Emna Ajbouni (Tunisia)

12 July Friendly	Senegal	1–0	DR Congo	Thiès, Senegal
17:00 UTC+1	Vukulu 90+2' (o.g.)	Report		Stadium: Stade Lat-Dior

16 July Friendly	Senegal	2–0	DR Congo	Thiès, Senegal
17:00 UTC+1	Baldé 41'; Ndiaye 66'	Report		Stadium: Stade Lat-Dior

27 October Friendly	DR Congo	1–2	Uganda	Kinshasa
15:30 UTC+1	Mawete 61'	Report	Ikwaput 22'; Kabene 77'	Stadium: Stade des Martyrs

30 October Friendly	DR Congo	1–3	Uganda	Kinshasa
15:30 UTC+1	Mawete 61'	Report	Ikwaput 16', 28'; Nambi 35'	Stadium: Stade des Martyrs

=== 2025 ===
20 February WAFCON 2026 qualifying	Botswana	0–2	DR Congo	Francistown, Botswana
14:00 UTC+1		Report	Gaofetoge 1' (o.g.); Mabomba 90+8'	Stadium: Obed Itani Chilume Stadium

26 February WAFCON 2026 qualifying	DR Congo	0–0	Botswana	Kinshasa
17:00 UTC+1		Report		Stadium: Stade des Martyrs; Referee: Shamirah Nabadda (Uganda)

30 May Friendly	Tanzania	2–1	DR Congo	Dar es Salaam, Tanzania
18:00 UTC+1	Luvanga 28', 88'	Report	Dikisha 71'	Stadium: Azam Complex Stadium

3 June Friendly	Tanzania	3–1	DR Congo	Dar es Salaam, Tanzania
18:00 UTC+1	Clement 28'; Singano 44'; Luvanga 48'	Report	Dikisha 89'	Stadium: Azam Complex Stadium

29 June Friendly	Algeria	1–0	DR Congo	Blida, Algeria
17:00 UTC+1	Boussaha 30'	Report		Stadium: Mustapha Tchaker Stadium

6 July WAFCON 2024	Senegal	4–0	DR Congo	Mohammédia, Morocco
15:00 UTC+1	Diop 5', 22'; N. Ndiaye 13', 40'	Report		Stadium: El Bachir Stadium; Referee: Shahenda El Maghrabi (Egypt)

9 July WAFCON 2024	DR Congo	2–4	Morocco	Rabat, Morocco
20:00 UTC+1	Kanjinga 6'; Mawete 70'	Report	Chebbak 25', 43', 75'; Mrabet 83' (pen.)	Stadium: Olympic Stadium; Referee: Antsino Twanyanyukwa (Namibia)

12 July WAFCON 2024	Zambia	1–0	DR Congo	Mohammédia, Morocco
20:00 UTC+1	Kundananji 9'	Report		Stadium: El Bachir Stadium; Referee: Josphine Wanjiku (Kenya)

== Forthcoming fixtures ==
=== 2025 ===
October WAFCON 2026 qualifying	DR Congo	v	South Africa	Kinshasa

October WAFCON 2026 qualifying	South Africa	v	DR Congo	South Africa

== See also ==
- DR Congo women's national football team
- DR Congo national football team results (2020–present)
