= Central African Republic women's national football team results =

This article lists the results and fixtures for the Central African Republic women's national football team.

the Central African Republic women's national football team is the team representing the Central African Republic in international women's association football, It is governed by the Central African Football Federation and it competes as a member of the Confederation of African Football (CAF).

The national team appeared for the first time in the 2018 Women's Africa Cup of Nations qualification having been drawn to face Congo. the Central Africans debutants lost their first match (2–0) to the Congolese team. however, in their home match hosted in the Barthélemy Boganda Stadium the CAR team showed better performance resulting in their first draw with Christelle Demba scoring the team's first goal. 2020 saw the squad participating in the 2020 UNIFFAC Women's Cup where they drew the Gabonese and Chadian teams and lost to DR Congolese and Equatoguinean teams.

As of 13 October 2022, the Central African Republic team is yet to be ranked in the FIFA ranking.

== Record per opponent ==
Key

Positive balance (more wins than losses)
Neutral balance (as many wins as losses)
Negative balance (more losses than wins)

The following table shows Central African Republic' all-time official international record per opponent:

Opponent	Pld	W	D	L	GF	GA	GD	W%	Confederation
Cameroon	2	0	0	2	0	3	−3	0.00	CAF
Chad	1	0	1	0	0	0	0	0.00	CAF
Congo	2	0	1	1	1	3	−2	0.00	CAF
DR Congo	1	0	0	1	0	4	−4	0.00	CAF
Equatorial Guinea	1	0	0	1	1	4	−3	0.00	CAF
Gabon	1	0	1	0	1	1	0	0.00	CAF
Mali	2	0	0	2	1	10	−9	0.00	CAF
Total	10	0	3	7	4	25	−21	00.00	—

== Results ==
=== 2006 ===
19 February 2006 2006 AFWCON qualification Preliminary round 1st leg	Senegal	4–0	Central African Republic	Dakar, Senegal
--:-- UTC+0

=== 2018 ===
4 April 2018 2018 AFWCON qualification First round 1st leg	Congo	2–0	Central African Republic	Brazzaville, Congo
15:30 UTC+1	Kokolo 40' (pen.); Dembélé 44'	Report		Stadium: Stade Alphonse Massemba-Débat; Referee: Jonesia Rukyaa Kabakama (Tanzania)

4 April 2018 2018 AFWCON qualification First round 1st leg	Central African Republic	1–1 (3–1 agg.)	Congo	Bangui, Central African Republic
15:00 UTC+1	Demba 71'	Report	Dembélé 18'	Stadium: Barthélemy Boganda Stadium; Referee: Suavis Iratunga (Burundi)
Note: Congo won 3–1 on aggregate.

=== 2020 ===
18 February 2020 2020 UNIFFAC Women's Cup	Central African Republic	0–0	Chad	Mongomo, Equatorial Guinea
18:00				Stadium: Estadio de Mongomo

20 February 2020 2020 UNIFFAC Women's Cup	Gabon	1–1	Central African Republic	Mongomo, Equatorial Guinea
16:00	Mazaly 78'	Report	Yamale 61' (pen.)	Stadium: Estadio de Mongomo

22 February 2020 2020 UNIFFAC Women's Cup	DR Congo	4–0	Central African Republic	Mongomo, Equatorial Guinea
16:00	Kipoyi ??'; Pambani ??'; Kasaj ??'; Kizinga ??'			Stadium: Estadio de Mongomo

24 February 2020 2020 UNIFFAC Women's Cup	Equatorial Guinea	4–1	Central African Republic	Ebibeyin, Equatorial Guinea
16:00	Nke 10', 32'; Manga 33'; Obono	Report	Demba 31'	Stadium: Estadio de Ebibeyin

=== 2021 ===
18 October 2021 2022 AFWCON qualification First round 1st leg	Central African Republic	0–1	Cameroon	Douala, Cameroon
		Report	Nchout 90+1'	Stadium: Japoma Stadium

24 October 2021 2022 AFWCON qualification First round 2nd leg	Cameroon	2–0 (3–0 agg.)	Central African Republic	Yaoundé, Cameroon
	Yango 69'; Bodolo 90+3'	Report		Stadium: Stade Ahmadou Ahidjo
Note: Cameroon won 3–0 on aggregate.

=== 2023 ===
22 September 2023 2024 AFWCON qualification First round 1st leg	Central African Republic	1–7	Mali	Douala, Cameroon
14:00 UTC+1	Demba 45+3' (pen.)	Report	A. Diarra 3', 15' (pen.), 55'; F. Diarra 6'; O. Koné 18'; A. Traoré 43', 48'	Stadium: Stade de la Réunification

26 September 2023 2024 AFWCON qualification First round 2nd leg	Mali	3–0 (10–1 agg.)	Central African Republic	Bamako, Mali
16:30 UTC+0	A. Diarra 31'; A. Traoré 36'; S. Diarra 58'			Stadium: Stade du 26 Mars
Note: Mali won 10–1 on aggregate.

== See also ==
- Central African Republic national football team results
