= 2020 UNIFFAC Women's Cup =

Torneo Femenino UNIFFAC 2020

Tournament details
- Host country: Equatorial Guinea
- City: Ebibeyin; Mongomo
- Dates: 18 – 28 February
- Teams: 5 (from 1 sub-confederation)
- Venue: 2 (in 2 host cities)

Final positions
- Champions: Equatorial Guinea (1st title)
- Runners-up: DR Congo

Tournament statistics
- Matches played: 11
- Goals scored: 28 (2.55 per match)
- Top scorer(s): (Equatorial Guinea) Salomé Nke (4 goals)
- Best player: (Equatorial Guinea) Celestina Manga

The 2020 UNIFFAC Women's Tournament (Spanish: Torneo Femenino UNIFFAC 2020) is the inaugural edition of the UNIFFAC Women's Cup, an international women's football tournament contested by the women's national association football teams of Central Africa organized by the Central African Football Federations' Union. The tournament took place in Equatorial Guinea from 18 to 28 February 2020.

Host Equatorial Guinea claimed the inaugural title after defeating DR Congo 4–2 on penalties in the final.

== Participants ==
A total of 5 out of 8 UNIFFAC members confirmed their participation in the tournament.

Team	Appearance	Previous best performance	FIFA ranking December 2019
Central African Republic	1st	Debut	NR
Chad	1st	Debut	NR
DR Congo	1st	Debut	108
Equatorial Guinea	1st	Debut	71
Gabon	1st	Debut	126

Did not enter

- Cameroon
- São Tomé and Príncipe
- Congo

== Venues ==
Ebibeyin	Mongomo
Estadio de Ebibeyin	Estadio de Mongomo
Capacity: 12,000	Capacity: 13.750

== Squads ==
- DR Congo :
- Gabon :

== Group Stage ==
All times are local, CAT (UTC+1)

Pos	Team	Pld	W	D	L	GF	GA	GD	Pts	Qualification
1	DR Congo	4	2	2	0	9	3	+6	8	Advance to Final
2	Equatorial Guinea (H)	4	2	2	0	8	4	+4	8	Advance to Final
3	Gabon	4	0	3	1	4	5	−1	3	
4	Chad	4	0	3	1	5	7	−2	3	
5	Central African Republic	4	0	2	2	2	9	−7	2	

Source: FastScore
(H) Hosts
18 February 2020
16:00

Equatorial Guinea	2–1	Gabon
	Report (FEGAFOOT)

Estadio de Ebibeyin, Ebibeyin
18 February 2020
18:00

Central African Republic	0–0	Chad

Estadio de Mongomo, Mongomo

20 February 2020
16:00

Gabon	1–1	Central African Republic
Mazaly 78'	Report (FEGAFOOT)	Yamale 61' (pen.)

Estadio de Mongomo, Mongomo
20 February 2020
16:00

Equatorial Guinea	1–1	DR Congo
Nké 73'	Report	Pambani 80'

Estadio de Ebibeyin, Ebibeyin

22 February 2020
16:00

DR Congo	4–0	Central African Republic
Kipoyi ??'; Pambani ??'; Kasaj ??'; Kizinga ??'

Estadio de Mongomo, Mongomo
22 February 2020
16:00

Chad	2–2	Gabon

Estadio de Ebibeyin, Ebibeyin

24 February 2020
16:00

Equatorial Guinea	4–1	Central African Republic
Nke 10', 32'; Manga 33'; Obono ??'	Report (FEGUIFUT)	Demba 31'

Estadio de Ebibeyin, Ebibeyin
24 February 2020
18:00

DR Congo	4–2	Chad
Mfwamba 25', 26'; Kabakaba 40', 50'	Report	Larkimgam 55'; Ouamtibaye 80' (.pen)

Estadio de Mongomo, Mongomo

26 February 2020
16:00

DR Congo	0–0	Gabon
	Report (FEGAFOOT)

Estadio de Ebibeyin, Ebibeyin
26 February 2020
18:00

Equatorial Guinea	1–1	Chad

Estadio de Mongomo, Mongomo

== Final ==
Having secured the top positions in the Group Stage, DR Congo and Equatorial Guinea faced off in the final of the inaugural edition.

28 February 2020
16:00

DR Congo	0–0	Equatorial Guinea
Penalties
	2–4

Estadio de Mongomo, Mongomo

== Statistics ==
=== Goalscorers ===
There were 28 goals scored in 11 matches, for an average of 2.55 goals per match.

4 goals

- (Equatorial Guinea) Salomé Nke

2 goals

- (Democratic Republic of the Congo) Grâce Mfwamba
- (Democratic Republic of the Congo) Naomie Kaba-kaba

1 goal

- (Central African Republic) Christelle Demba
- (Central African Republic) Florencia Yamale
- (Chad) Solange Larkingam
- (Chad) Ouamtibaye
- (Chad) Unknown
- (Chad) Unknown
- (Chad) Unknown
- (Democratic Republic of the Congo) Unknown
- (Democratic Republic of the Congo) Ruth Kipoyi
- (Democratic Republic of the Congo) Falonne Pambani
- (Democratic Republic of the Congo) Marlène Kasaj
- (Democratic Republic of the Congo) Exaucée Kizinga
- (Equatorial Guinea) Celestina Manga
- (Equatorial Guinea) Elena Obono
- (Equatorial Guinea) Unknown
- (Equatorial Guinea) Unknown
- (Gabon) Vanessa Mazaly
- (Gabon) Unknown
- (Gabon) Unknown
- (Gabon) Unknown

=== Final ranking ===
R	Team	Pts.	P	W	D	L	GF	GA	GD
1	Equatorial Guinea	9	5	2	3	0	8	4	+4
2	DR Congo	9	5	2	3	0	9	3	+6
3	Gabon	3	4	0	3	1	4	5	−1
4	Chad	3	4	0	3	1	5	7	−2
5	Central African Republic	2	4	0	2	2	2	9	−7
