= List of football stadiums in Equatorial Guinea =

This is a list of sports stadiums in Equatorial Guinea, ranked in descending order of capacity. Stadiums in Equatorial Guinea with a capacity of 4,000 or more are included, even though the list is incomplete.

== Current stadiums ==
#	Image	Stadium	Capacity	City	RF
1		Estadio de Bata	35,700	Bata	
2		Estadio de Malabo	15,250	Malabo	
3		Estadio de Mongomo	10,000	Mongomo	
4		Estadio de Ebibeyin	8,000	Ebibeyin	
5		Estadio La Libertad	4,000	Bata	

== See also ==
- Lists of stadiums
- List of African stadiums by capacity
- Football in Equatorial Guinea
