= Christelle Demba =

Central African footballer

Personal information
- Full name: Christelle Ursulla Demba
- Date of birth: 26 February 1998 (age 28)
- Place of birth: Central African Republic
- Height: 1.70 m (5 ft 7 in)
- Position: Forward

Team information
- Current team: Riga FC
- Number: 8

Senior career*
| Years | Team | Apps | (Gls) |
| 2021–2022 | Difaâ Hassani El Jadidi | | |
| 2022–2023 | Amed SFK | 27 | (7) |
| 2023–2024 | ALG Spor | 26 | (7) |
| 2024– | Riga FC | 28 | (26) |

International career^{‡}
| 2018– | Central African Republic | 10 | (3) |
- * Club domestic league appearances and goals as of 30 November 2025 ‡ National team caps and goals as of 26 September 2023

Christelle Ursulla Demba (born 26 February 1998) is a Central African professional footballer who plays as a forward for Riga FC in the Sieviešu futbola līga and the Central African Republic national team.

== Club career ==
=== Difaâ Hassani El Jadidi ===
In February 2021, Demba made history by becoming the first female footballer from the Central African Republic to play professionally as she joined the Moroccan club Difaâ Hassani El Jadidi in El Jadida.

=== Amed SFK ===
In March 2022, Demba joined Turkish side Amed SFK on a free transfer deal. She played her first game with the team on 19 March 2022, starting in a 0–1 loss to 1207 Antalya Spor. On 17 April 2022, she scored her first goal on a 4–0 win over Altay.

=== ALG Spor ===
Demba made the move to ALG Spor on 24 August 2023 on a free transfer deal. On 27 August 2023, she debuted for the club after she came on as a substitute for Karoline Cardozo de França in the 79th minute in a 2–1 win over Beşiktaş. On 16 September she scored her first goal for the club in a 4–0 win against Ataşehir Belediyespor.

=== Riga FC ===
On 5 July 2024, Demba joined Latvian Side Riga FC. On 6 July 2024, she made her debut for the team in a 3–0 win over FK Iecava/DFS, entering as a substitute at the 46th minute and scoring her first goal for the club in the 83rd minute.

== International career ==
In March 2018, Demba was first called to the Central African Republic national team for their second-ever international match against Congo as a part of the 2018 Women's Africa Cup of Nations qualification. failing to score in the first match away in Brazzaville, Demba scored the first international goal for the Central African Republic in the home match leveling the score.

Included in the national team squad for their debut appearance in the 2020 UNIFFAC Women's Cup, Demba scored her second international goal in the match against host team Equatorial Guinea, equalizing the score. However, the Equatoguinean team later regained control of the game and secured a 4–1 victory.

Demba has been captaining the senior team since 2021, beginning with their encounter against Cameroon. Included in the squad for the 2024 Women's Africa Cup of Nations qualification. She scored her third goal from the penalty spot during a 7–1 defeat to Mali and is currently the top scorer for the national team.

== Career statistics ==
As of match played 26 September 2023

| Year | Central African Republic | |
| Year | Apps | Goals |
|---|---|---|
| 2018 | 2 | 1 |
| 2020 | 4 | 1 |
| 2021 | 2 | 0 |
| 2023 | 2 | 1 |
| Total | 10 | 3 |

As of match played 26 September 2023
Scores and results list Central African Republic's goal tally first, score column indicates score after each Demba goal.

List of international goals scored by Christelle Demba
| No. | Date | Venue | Opponent | Score | Result | Competition |
|---|---|---|---|---|---|---|
| 1 | 4 April 2018 | Barthélemy Boganda Stadium, Bangui, Central African Republic | Congo | 1–1 | 1–1 | 2018 Women's Africa Cup of Nations qualification |
| 2 | 24 February 2020 | Estadio de Ebibeyin, Ebibeyin, Equatorial Guinea | Equatorial Guinea | 1–1 | 1–4 | 2020 UNIFFAC Women's Cup |
| 3 | 22 September 2023 | Stade de la Réunification, Douala, Cameroon | Mali | 1–5 | 1–7 | 2024 Women's Africa Cup of Nations qualification |
