= UNIFFAC Women's U-20 Cup =

- Founded: 2024
- Region: Central African (UNIFFAC )
- Teams: 3
- Current champions: Cameroon
- Most championships: Cameroon
- 2024 UNIFFAC Women's U-20 Cup

The UNIFFAC Women's U-20 Cup, is an association football tournament for teams from Central African organized by Central African Football Federations' Union (UNIFFAC).

== History ==
The first edition was played in Cameroon in 13 - 15 February 2024 with three teams, which included some foreign-based players. Central African Republic participated with an under-17 side.

== Results ==
Year	Host	Final			Third Place Match		
Year	Host	Winner	Score	Runner-up	3rd Place	Score	4th Place
2024	Cameroon	Cameroon	Group stage	Congo	Central African Republic	Group stage	
2026	Central African Republic	5 - 11 December					

== Participating nations ==
Legend

- 1st – Champions
- 2nd – Runners-up
- 3rd – Third place
- 4th – Fourth place
- SF – Losing semi-finals
- QF – Quarter-finals
- GS – Group stage
- Q — Qualified for upcoming tournament
- • – Did not qualify
- × – Withdrew
- – Hosts

Team	(Cameroon) 2024	Years
Cameroon	1st	1
Congo	2nd	1
Central African Republic	3rd	1
Chad		0
São Tomé and Príncipe		0
DR Congo		0
Gabon		0
Equatorial Guinea		0
Total (8 Teams)	3	
