= Fideline Ngoy =

Congolese footballer (born 1991)

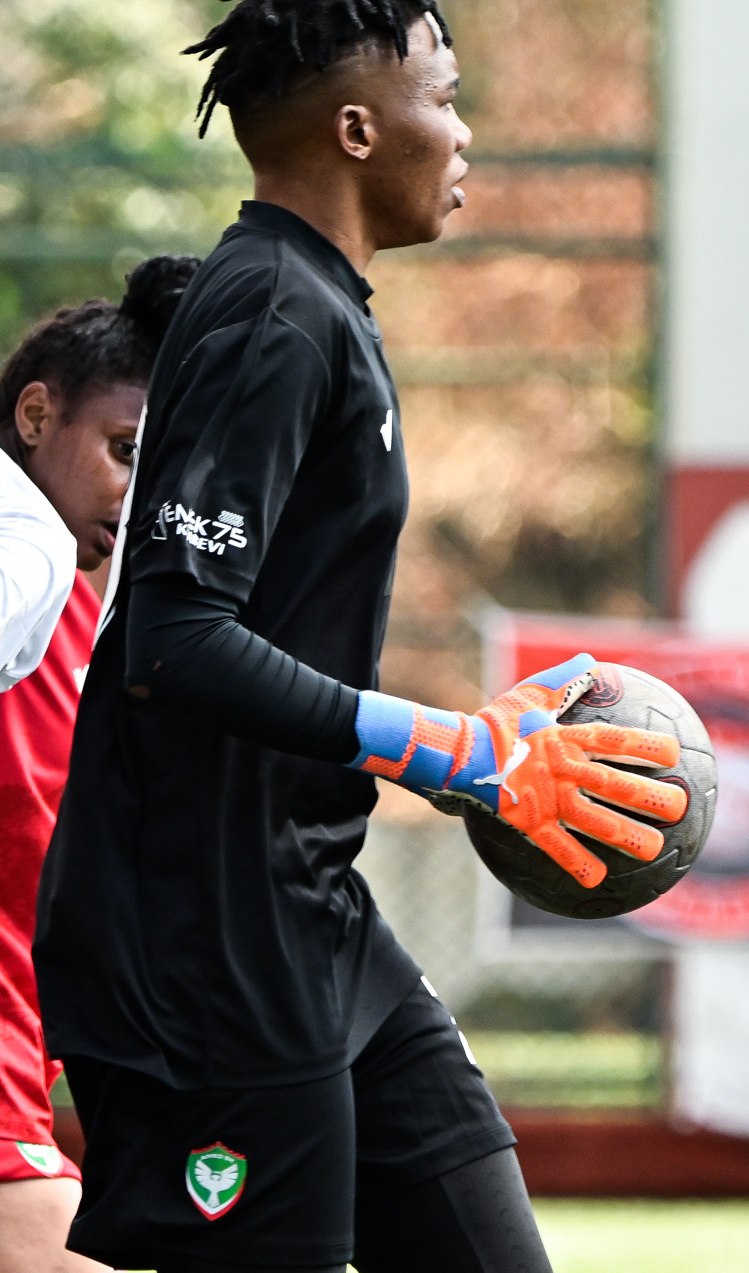
- Ngoy with Amed in 2023

Personal information
- Full name: Fideline Ngoy Mudimbi
- Date of birth: 31 March 1991 (age 35)
- Place of birth: Kinshasa, Zaire
- Height: 1.80 m (5 ft 11 in)
- Position: Goalkeeper

Team information
- Current team: TP Mazembe
- Number: 1

Senior career*
Years	Team	Apps	(Gls)
2008	Trinita		
2012	Force Terrestre		
- Progresso do Sambizanga
- Amani
2022–2023	Adana İdman Yurdu	8	(0)
2023	ALG Spor	6	(0)
2023–2024	Amed	10	(0)
2024–	TP Mazembe		

International career
2008	DR Congo U20	1	(0)
- DR Congo
- * Club domestic league appearances and goals as of 19 November 2023

Fideline Ngoy Mudimbi (born 31 March 1991) is a Congolese footballer who plays as a goalkeeper for LINAFF club TP Mazembe and captains the DR Congo national team.

== Club career ==
Ngoy has played for Trinita, Force Terrestre and Amani in the Democratic Republic of the Congo and for Progresso Associação do Sambizanga in Angola.

She moved to Turkey mid November 2022, and signed with Adana İdman Yurdu to play in the 2022–23 Women's Super League.

== International career ==
Ngoy represented the DR Congo at the 2008 FIFA U-20 Women's World Cup, appearing in a 1–3 loss to Japan. She capped at senior level during the 2012 African Women's Championship.

== Controversy ==
Playing in Turkey, Ngoy claimed to have been born on 31 March 1999, despite previous official registries from FIFA and CAF indicating she was born on 31 March 1991. In December 2023, during the 2024 Women's Africa Cup of Nations qualification, she used the 1999 document to play against Equatorial Guinea, which had hosted the 2012 African Women's Championship, where she had used the 1991 document. After the conclusion of the round and the in-field DR Congo qualification, Ngoy's irregular fielding was claimed by the Equatoguinean Football Federation, expecting CAF disqualifies DR Congo and reinstates Equatorial Guinea as a result.

== Honours ==
TP Mazembe

- LINAFF: 2024
- CAF Women's Champions League: 2024

== See also ==
- List of Democratic Republic of the Congo women's international footballers
