= UNIFFAC =

Governing body for Central African football associations

Central African Football Federations' Union; Union des Fédérations de Football d'Afrique Centrale (French); União das Federações Centroafricanas de Futebol (Portuguese); Unión de Federaciones de Fútbol de África Central (Spanish); UNIFFAC

- Abbreviation: UNIFFAC
- Type: CAF regional subconfederation
- Region served: Central Africa
- Members: 8 members: Cameroon; Central African Republic; Chad; (Republic of the Congo) Congo; (Democratic Republic of the Congo) DR Congo; Equatorial Guinea; Gabon; São Tomé and Príncipe
- Official language: English, French, Portuguese and Spanish
- President: (Cameroon) Iya Mohammed
- Affiliations: CAF, FIFA

The Central African Football Federations' Union (French: Union des Fédérations de Football d'Afrique Centrale; Portuguese: União das Federações Centroafricanas de Futebol; Spanish: Unión de Federaciones de Fútbol de África Central), also known by its acronym UNIFFAC, is a regional subconfederation affiliated with CAF and the governing body for football in Central Africa.

== Members ==
Country	Governing body	National team captain
Cameroon	Cameroonian Football Federation	Eric Maxim Choupo-Moting
Central African Republic	Central African Football Federation	Geoffrey Kondogbia
Chad	Chadian Football Federation	Ezechiel N'Douassel
Congo	Congolese Football Federation	Amour Loussoukou
DR Congo	Congolese Association Football Federation	Chancel Mbemba
Equatorial Guinea	Equatoguinean Football Federation	Emilio Nsue
Gabon	Gabonese Football Federation	Jim Allevinah
São Tomé and Príncipe	São Toméan Football Federation	Luís Leal

== Competitions ==
=== Current title holders ===
Competition	Year	Champions	Title	Runners-up	Next edition	Dates
Men's national teams
UNIFFAC U20 Cup	2026	Cameroon		Central African Republic	TBD	
UNIFFAC U17 Cup	2025	Cameroon	5	DR Congo		
UNIFFAC U-15 Schools Cup	2022	(Democratic Republic of the Congo) Institut Horizon of Bukavu	1st	(Republic of the Congo) GS Louis Samuel	TBD	
Women's national teams
UNIFFAC Women's Cup	2020	Equatorial Guinea	1st	DR Congo	TBD	
UNIFFAC Women's U-20 Cup	2024	Cameroon		Congo	2026	5- 11 December
UNIFFAC Women's U-17 Cup						
UNIFFAC Girls Schools Cup	2022	(Republic of the Congo) CEG Mfilou of Brazzaville	1st	(Democratic Republic of the Congo) USC of Goma	TBD	
Women's club teams
CAF Women's Champions League Qualifiers	2025	(Equatorial Guinea) 15 de Agosto	2sd	(Cameroon) FC Ebolowa	2026	

=== Defunct competitions ===
Competition	Period
Central African Games Football tournament	(1976–1987)
UDEAC Cup	1984–1990
UNIFAC Cup	1999
CEMAC Cup	2003–2014

A women's tournament and the re-introduction of the Clubs Cup was announced on 11 January 2011.

== Rankings ==
=== Football ===
FIFA Rankings (as of 18 November 2026)
UNIFFAC*	FIFA	+/−	National Team	Points
1	39	▲1	DR Congo	1503.08
2	42	Steady	Cameroon	1495.84
3	87	▼2	Gabon	1269.58
4	108	▼5	Equatorial Guinea	1184.52
5	137	▼5	Congo	1094.13
6	150	▼5	Central African Republic	1049.66
7	180	▲1	Chad	896.85
8	194	Steady	São Tomé and Príncipe	855.1

FIFA Rankings (as of 20 October 2026)
UNIFFAC*	FIFA	+/−	National Team	Points
1	62	▲9	Cameroon	1416.49
2	93	▼3	Equatorial Guinea	1209.26
3	112	▼1	Congo	1161.03
4	114	▼8	DR Congo	1156.63
5	148	▼4	Central African Republic	1038.44
6	150	▼1	Gabon	1028.74
7	156	Steady	Chad	985.55

=== Futsal ===
FIFA Rankings (as of 24 September 2026)
UNIFFAC*	FIFA	+/−	National Team	Points
1	64	▲1	Equatorial Guinea	999.11
2	77	Steady	Cameroon	973.03

FIFA Rankings (as of 24 September 2026)
UNIFFAC*	FIFA	+/−	National Team	Points
1	83	Steady	Cameroon	744.2

=== Beach Soccer ===
BSWW Rankings (as of 2 September 2026)
UNIFFAC*	BSWW	+/−	National Team	Points
1	90	▼1	Cameroon	15.25

== See also ==
- UNAF (North Africa)
- CECAFA (East Africa)
- COSAFA (South Africa)
- West African Football Union (WAFU; West Africa)
- Confederation of African Football (CAF; Africa)
