= Liga Fútbol Sala de Guinea Ecuatorial =

- Founded: 2014
- Country: Equatorial Guinea
- Confederation: CAF
- Level on pyramid: 1
- Domestic cup: Equatoguinean Cup
- Current champions: Atletico Los Angeles (4th title)
- Most championships: Atletico Los Angeles (4 titles)
- Website: Official website
- Current: 2018–19

Equatoguinean Futsal Championship (Spanish: Campeonato de Guinea Ecuatorial de Futsal) is the premier futsal league in Equatorial Guinea. The competition is run by the Liga Fútbol Sala de Guinea Ecuatorial under the auspices of the Equatoguinean Football Federation.

== List of champions ==
- 2014–15: Atletico Los Angeles
- 2015–16: Atletico Los Angeles
- 2016–17: Atletico Los Angeles
- 2017–18: Atletico Los Angeles
- 2018–19:

== See also ==
- Equatoguinean Futsal Cup
