= Émeraude Mawanda =

Congolese footballer (born 1998)

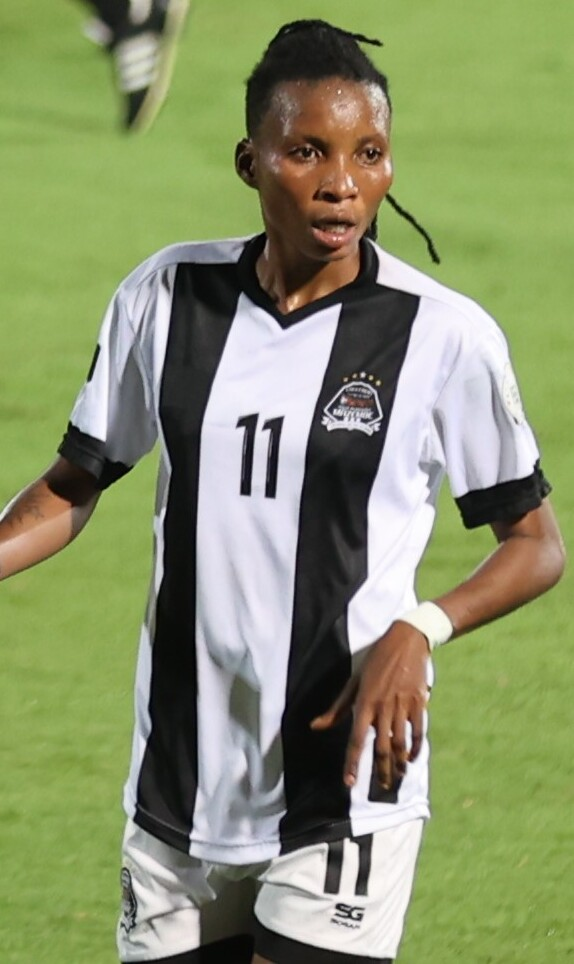
- Mawanda during the 2024 CAF WCL final.

Personal information
- Full name: Aimeraude Mawanda Muyenga
- Date of birth: 25 March 1998 (age 28)
- Position: Defender

Team information
- Current team: TP Mazembe
- Number: 11

Senior career*
Years	Team	Apps	(Gls)
20??–20??	FCF Attaque Sans Recul		
20??–	TP Mazembe		

International career^{‡}
2015	DR Congo U20	1	(1)
2021–	DR Congo	1	(1)
- * Club domestic league appearances and goals ‡ National team caps and goals as of 25 March 2021.

Aimeraude Mawanda Muyenga (born 25 March 1998) is a Congolese footballer who plays as a defender for LINAFF club TP Mazembe and the DR Congo national team.

== Club career ==
Mawanda has played for FCF Attaque Sans Recul and TP Mazembe in the Democratic Republic of the Congo.

== International career ==
Mawanda made her senior debut for the DR Congo on 25 March 2021 in a 4–0 friendly home win over Congo.

=== International goals ===
Scores and results list DR Congo goal tally first.

No.	Date	Venue	Opponent	Score	Result	Competition	Ref.
1	25 March 2021	Stade des Martyrs, Kinshasa, Democratic Republic of the Congo	Congo	4–0	4–0	Friendly	

== Honours ==
TP Mazembe

- CAF Women's Champions League: 2024

== See also ==
- List of Democratic Republic of the Congo women's international footballers
