= Tristan Mombo =

Gabonese football player and manager

Personal information
- Date of birth: 24 August 1970 (age 56)

Team information
- Current team: Gabon Women (manager)

International career
Years	Team	Apps	(Gls)
1992–2001	Gabon	45	(4)

Managerial career
- Gabon Women

Tristan Mombo (born 24 August 1970) is a Gabonese football manager and former player. He has represented the Gabon national team. He currently coaches the Gabon women's national team.

== International career ==
Mombo played in 45 matches for the Gabon national football team from 1992 to 2001. He was also named in Gabon's squad for the 1994 African Cup of Nations tournament.
