= Pamela Malembo =

DR Congolese footballer

Personal information
- Full name: Ivonne Malembo
- Date of birth: 9 April 1989 (age 37)
- Height: 1.57 m (5 ft 2 in)
- Position: Forward

Senior career*
Years	Team	Apps	(Gls)
- Grand Hotel

International career
- DR Congo
- * Club domestic league appearances and goals

Ivonne Malembo, «Pamela» (born 9 April 1989) is a DR Congolese footballer who plays as a forward. She has been a member of the DR Congo women's national team.

== International career ==
Malembo capped for the DR Congo at senior level during the 2012 African Women's Championship.

== See also ==
- List of Democratic Republic of the Congo women's international footballers
