= UNIFFAC Women's Cup =

- Founded: 2020
- Region: Central African (UNIFFAC )
- Teams: 6
- Current champions: Equatorial Guinea
- Most championships: Equatorial Guinea
- 2020 UNIFFAC Women's Cup

The UNIFFAC Women's Cup, also called Women's Challenge Cup, is an association football tournament for teams from Central African organized by Central African Football Federations' Union (UNIFFAC).

== History ==
The first edition was played in Equatorial Guinea 2020 with five teams, which included some foreign-based players.

== Results ==
Year	Host	Final			Third Place Match		
Year	Host	Winner	Score	Runner-up	3rd Place	Score	4th Place
2020	Equatorial Guinea	Equatorial Guinea	4-2	DR Congo	Gabon	Group stage	Chad

== Participating nations ==
Legend

- 1st – Champions
- 2nd – Runners-up
- 3rd – Third place
- 4th – Fourth place
- SF – Losing semi-finals
- QF – Quarter-finals
- GS – Group stage
- Q — Qualified for upcoming tournament
- • – Did not qualify
- × – Withdrew
- – Hosts

Team	(Equatorial Guinea) 2020	Years
Equatorial Guinea	1st	1
DR Congo	2nd	1
Chad	4th	1
Gabon	3rd	1
Central African Republic	5th	1
Cameroon		0
Congo		0
São Tomé and Príncipe		0
Total (8 Teams)	5	
