= Camila Nobre =

Brazilian football and futsal player (born 1988)

Personal information
- Full name: Camila do Carmo Nobre de Oliveira
- Date of birth: 10 June 1988 (age 38)
- Place of birth: São Paulo, São Paulo, Brazil
- Height: 1.62 m (5 ft 4 in)
- Position: Midfielder

Senior career*
Years	Team	Apps	(Gls)
2007–2008	Palmeiras		
2009	Jaguariúna		
2010	São Caetano		
2011–2012	São José		
2013	São Caetano		
2014	Portuguesa		
2015	Centro Olímpico	10	(0)
2016	São José	7	(0)
2016–2017	Madrid CFF	1	(0)
2019	Osasco Audax	12	(0)

International career^{‡}
2012–2016	Equatorial Guinea		
- * Club domestic league appearances and goals as of 19 July 2019 ‡ National team caps and goals as of 15 July 2013

Camila do Carmo Nobre de Oliveira (born 10 June 1988), known as Camila Nobre, is a Brazilian former professional football and futsal player. She has played as a midfielder for the Equatorial Guinea women's national team, but was later ruled to be ineligible.

== Club career ==
Nobre has played almost entirely for São Paulo clubs, highlighting the first of her two spells with São José EC, with which she won the 2011 Copa Libertadores Femenina. After a few years, she went to play in the Spanish Segunda División for Madrid CFF, where she achieved promotion to the Primera División.

== International career ==
Nobre played for Brazil universities in the 2013 Summer Universiade. She appeared in five matches during the tournament, being an unused substitute in the semifinal against Great Britain. Her team finished third, earning the bronze medal.

=== Controversy ===
From 2012 to 2016, Nobre made appearances for the Equatorial Guinea women's national football team despite having no connection with the African nation. She was part of the squad that won the 2012 African Women's Championship.

According to Federação Paulista de Futebol, based on her original Brazilian nationality, her full name is Camila do Carmo Nobre de Oliveira and she was born on 10 June 1988 in São Paulo. These data do not match the information that Equatorial Guinea had submitted to the CAF on the occasion of the 2012 African Women's Championship. There, based on the Equatoguinean passport that African country gave her, her full name was Camila Maria Nobre de Carmo and her date of birth was 10 July 1994. Also, the list published by CAF reported that at the time she was playing for a local Equatoguinean side, E Waiso Ipola, when in reality she was signed with São José Esporte Clube in Brazil, having spent all her entire club career in her natal country. She took advantage of her false age to compete in the 2014 African U-20 Women's World Cup Qualifying Tournament.

On 11 April 2016, Camila Nobre was sanctioned by FIFA with a ten-match suspension, to be served in the next matches of the representative team of Equatorial Guinea for which she would be eligible, as well as a fine of CHF 2,000, a reprimand and a warning, on the basis of art. 61 paras 1 and 2 of the FDC. On 4 August 2016, her double identity case led CAF to disqualify the Equatorial Guinea national women's team from the Women's AFCON Cameroon 2016, and the subsequent suspensions from the 2018 and 2020 editions.

On 5 October 2017, FIFA determined the other ten Brazilian-born footballers who played for Equatorial Guinea at the 2015 CAF Women's Olympic Qualifying Tournament were ineligible. The sanction came from the April's original, involving Camila Nobre.
