= Éva Sumo =

French-born Congolese footballer (born 1993)

Personal information
- Full name: Éva Donasa Sumo
- Date of birth: 7 December 1993 (age 32)
- Place of birth: Bordeaux, Gironde, France
- Height: 1.69 m (5 ft 7 in)
- Position: Midfielder

Team information
- Current team: Al Ahli
- Number: 29

Youth career
- 2002–2003: ASU Saint-Jean
- 2003–2005: CML Floirac
- 2005–2007: RC Bordeaux
- 2007–2010: FCE Mérignac Arlac

Senior career*
Years	Team	Apps	(Gls)
2007–2009	FCE Mérignac Arlac	36	(5)
2009–2010	Le Mans UC 72	23	(6)
2010–2011	FCE Mérignac Arlac	21	(5)
2011–2012	ASJ Soyaux-Charente	10	(0)
2012–2014	FF Yzeure Allier Auvergne	34	(3)
2014–2015	AS Blanquefortaise	25	(11)
2015–2017	FC Girondins de Bordeaux	38	(5)
2017–2018	Stade Brestois 29	27	(5)
2018–2020	Olympique de Marseille	38	(5)
2020–2021	Thonon Évian GG FC	5	(0)
2021–2024	Le Havre AC	60	(1)
2024–2026	FC Nantes	13	(0)
2026–	Al Ahli	1	(0)

International career
2012	France U19	3	(0)
2025–	DR Congo		
- * Club domestic league appearances and goals as of 1 September 2026

Éva Donasa Sumo (born 7 December 1993) is a professional footballer who plays as a midfielder for Saudi Women's Premier League (SWPL) club Al Ahli. Born in France, she represents the Democratic Republic of the Congo national team.

== Club career ==
After joining Le Havre in July 2021. Sumo played every match during the 2021–22 season of the Division 2 Féminine and became a key figure in the midfield under manager Frédéric Gonçalves, playing an important role in helping Le Havre secure promotion.

In July 2024, Sumo joined fellow Première Ligue side FC Nantes, following three seasons with Le Havre. She made her first start of the season for the club on 7 December against Fleury.

== International career ==
Born in France, Sumo represented her birth country at under-19 level before switching allegiance in 2025 to represent the country of her father, the Democratic Republic of the Congo. She made her senior international debut for the DR Congo on 30 May 2025, starting in a friendly match against Tanzania at the Azam Complex Stadium in Dar es Salaam. She was later included in the final squad for the 2024 Women's Africa Cup of Nations and established herself as a regular in the team's defence.
