= 2024 UNIFFAC Women's U-20 Cup =

2024 UNIFFAC Women's U-20 Cup

Tournament details
- Host country: Cameroon
- City: Douala
- Dates: 13-15 February
- Teams: 3 (from 1 sub-confederation)
- Venue: 1 (in 1 host city)

Final positions
- Champions: Cameroon (1st title)
- Runners-up: Congo
- Third place: Central African Republic

Tournament statistics
- Matches played: 3
- Goals scored: 10 (3.33 per match)
- Top scorer: (Republic of the Congo) Chaïda Mabondzo (2 goals)

The 2024 UNIFFAC Women's U-20 Cup was the inaugural edition of the UNIFFAC Women's U-20 Cup, an international women's football tournament contested by the u-20 women's national association football teams of Central Africa organized by the Central African Football Federations' Union. The tournament took place in Cameroon from 13 to 15 February 2024. Central African Republic participated with an under-17 side.

== Participants ==
A total of 3 out of 8 UNIFFAC members confirmed their participation in the tournament.

Team	Appearance	Previous best performance
Central African Republic	1st	Debut
Congo	1st	Debut
Cameroon	1st	Debut

Did not enter

- São Tomé and Príncipe
- Chad
- DR Congo
- Gabon
- Equatorial Guinea

== Venues ==
Douala
Annexe de Stade de la Réunification
Capacity: 12,000

== Main Tournament ==
Pos	Team	Pld	W	D	L	GF	GA	GD	Pts	Qualification
1	Cameroon (H)	2	2	0	0	5	0	+5	6	Champion
2	Congo	2	1	0	1	3	5	−2	3	
3	Central African Republic	2	0	0	2	2	5	−3	0	

(H) Hosts
13 February 2024
15:30 UTC+1

Central African Republic U17	0–2	Cameroon
		Mbiadji 13'; Nana 21'

Annexe de Stade de la Réunification, Douala
14 February 2024
15:30 UTC+1

Cameroon	3–0	Congo
Kiki Meva 14'; Sinmi 28'; Ngo Bilong 31'

Annexe de Stade de la Réunification, Douala
Referee: Rachel Nzigire (Congo DR)
15 February 2024
15:30 UTC+1

Congo	3–2	Central African Republic U17
Malembe 14'; Mabondzo 48', 68'		Padou 12'; Andjigampa 42'

Annexe de Stade de la Réunification, Douala
Referee: Nadine Kenne (Cameroon)

== Statistics ==
=== Goalscorers ===
There were 10 goals scored in 3 matches, for an average of 3.33 goals per match.

2 goals

- (Republic of the Congo) Chaïda Mabondzo

1 goal

- (Central African Republic) Daviella Willemine Padou
- (Central African Republic) Christelle Silviane Andjigampa
- (Republic of the Congo) Destinée Croyance Fouka Malembe
- (Cameroon) Christiane Kiki Meva
- (Cameroon) Manuela Sinmi
- (Cameroon) Andree Melgrid Ngo Bilong
- (Cameroon) Suzie Mbiadji
- (Cameroon) Oceane Pierette Nana
