= Grâce Mfwamba =

DR Congolese footballer (born 1998)

Personal information
- Full name: Grâce Mfwamba Balongo
- Date of birth: 17 September 1998 (age 28)
- Place of birth: Kinshasa, DR Congo
- Position: Forward

Team information
- Current team: Al-Taraji
- Number: 20

Senior career*
Years	Team	Apps	(Gls)
–2019	DCMP/Bikira		
2020	CSF Bikira		
2020–2021	Malabo Kings		
2022	ALG Spor	14	(4)
2022–2024	Trabzonspor	49	(21)
2024–	Al-Taraji	18	(20)

International career^{‡}
2019–	DR Congo	9	(5)
- * Club domestic league appearances and goals as of 16 October 2026. ‡ National team caps and goals as of 24 February 2026.

Grâce Mfwamba Balongo (born 17 September 1998) is a DR Congolese footballer who plays as a forward for Saudi Women's Premier League club Al-Taraji and the DR Congo national team.

== Club career ==
Mfwamba has played for DCMP/Bikira and CSF Bikira in the Democratic Republic of the Congo, for Malabo Kings in Equatorial Guinea and for ALG Spor in Turkey. She enjoyed the 2021-22 Turkish Women's Super League champion title of her team. In the 2022–23 Turkish Women's Super League season, she transferred to Trabzonspor.

== International career ==
Mfwamba capped for the DR Congo at senior level during the 2020 CAF Women's Olympic Qualifying Tournament (first round). In the |2022–23 Turkish Women's Super League season, she transferred to Trabzonspor.

== Career statistics ==
As of match played 25 September 2023

Club	Season	League			Continental		National		Total	
Club	Season	Division	Apps	Goals	Apps	Goals	Apps	Goals	Apps	Goals
ALG Spor	2021-22	Super League	14	4	0	0	0	0	14	4
ALG Spor	Total		14	4	0	0	0	0	14	4
Trabzonspor	2022-23	Super League	20	10	0	0	0	0	20	10
Trabzonspor	2022–23	Super League	4	2	0	0	0	0	4	2
Trabzonspor	Total		24	12	0	0	0	0	24	12
Career total			38	16	0	0	0	0	38	16

=== International goals ===
Scores and results list DR Congo's goal tally first

No.	Date	Venue	Opponent	Score	Result	Competition	Ref.
1	5 April 2019	National Stadium, Dar es Salaam, Tanzania	Tanzania	2–1	2–2	2020 CAF Women's Olympic Qualifying Tournament (first round)	
2	9 April 2019	Stade des Martyrs, Kinshasa, Democratic Republic of the Congo	Tanzania	1–0	1–0	2020 CAF Women's Olympic Qualifying Tournament (first round)	
3	24 February 2020	Estadio de Ebibeyin, Ebibeyin, Equatorial Guinea	Chad	1–0	4–2	2020 UNNIFAC Women's Cup	
4	24 February 2020	Estadio de Ebibeyin, Ebibeyin, Equatorial Guinea	Chad	2–0	4–2	2020 UNNIFAC Women's Cup	

== Honours ==
Turkish Women's Super League

ALG Spor
Winners (1): 2021-22

== See also ==
- List of Democratic Republic of the Congo women's international footballers
