= Lola Okenve =

Equatoguinean footballer (born 1997)

Personal information
- Full name: Dolores Ángela Okenve Moyong
- Date of birth: 12 March 1997 (age 29)
- Place of birth: Libreville, Gabon
- Height: 1.56 m (5 ft 1 in)
- Positions: Left back; left winger

Senior career*
| Years | Team | Apps | (Gls) |
| 2014–2016 | Unió Astorga (seven-a-side) | 23 | (19) |
| 2016–2017 | At. Camp Clar | 19 | (1) |
| 2017–2018 | Joventut Almassora | | |
| 2019 | Pozoalbense | 8 | (0) |
| 2020 | Lorca Féminas | | |
| 2020–2025 | Viajes InterRías / Atlético Villalonga | 102+ | (6+) |
| 2025–2026 | Castellón | 18 | (4) |
| Total | | 170+ | (30+) |

International career^{‡}
| 2023–2026 | Equatorial Guinea | 3 | (0) |
- * Club domestic league appearances and goals as of 26 April 2026 ‡ National team caps and goals as of 8 June 2026

Dolores Ángela Okenve Moyong (born 12 March 1997) is an Equatoguinean former footballer who played as a left back. She is a former Equatorial Guinea international. She also holds Spanish citizenship.

== Early life ==
Okenve spent her infancy in Equatorial Guinea until the age of five, when she moved to Spain.

== Club career ==
Okenve played for Spanish side Joventut Almassora, where she was regarded as one of the club's most important players.

On 26 June 2025, Okenve signed for Castellón.

== International career ==
Okenve debuted for the Equatorial Guinea women's national football team during 2024 Summer Olympics qualification.

== Style of play ==
Okenve mainly operates as a fullback.

== Personal life ==
Okenve was born in Gabon to Equatoguinean parents.
