= Flavine Mawete =

Congolese footballer

Personal information
- Full name: Flavine Mawete Musolo
- Date of birth: 11 December 2000 (age 25)
- Place of birth: DR Congo
- Height: 1.79 m (5 ft 10 in)
- Position: Winger

Team information
- Current team: Djurgården
- Number: 9

Senior career*
Years	Team	Apps	(Gls)
- ASR
- Simba
2021–2022	Adana İdmanyurduspor	19	(6)
2022–	Djurgården	11	(1)

International career^{‡}
2019–	DR Congo	1+	
- * Club domestic league appearances and goals as of 11 May 2023 ‡ National team caps and goals as of 8 October 2019

Flavine Mawete Musolo (born 11 December 2000) is a Congolese footballer who plays as a winger for Dux Logroño in Liga F and the DR Congo national team.

== Club career ==
Mawete has played for FC Attaque Sans Recul (ASR) in the Democratic Republic of the Congo and for Simba in Tanzania.

In 2021, she moved to Turkey to join the Turkish Women's Super League club Adana İdmanyurduspor.

In September 2022, Mawete joined Djurgårdens IF from Adana İdmanyurduspor on a two and half year deal.

== International career ==
Mawete capped for the DR Congo at senior level during the 2020 CAF Women's Olympic Qualifying Tournament (third round).

=== International goals ===
Scores and results list DR Congo's goal tally first, score column indicates score after each Mawete goal.

List of international goals scored by Flavine Mawete
No.	Date	Venue	Opponent	Score	Result	Competition
1	12 April 2026	Ratchaburi Stadium, Ratchaburi, Thailand	Indonesia	2–1	7–1	2026 FIFA Series
2	12 April 2026	Ratchaburi Stadium, Ratchaburi, Thailand	Indonesia	6–1	7–1	2026 FIFA Series

== See also ==
- List of Democratic Republic of the Congo women's international footballers
