= Falonne Pambani =

DR Congolese footballer (born 1994)

Personal information
- Full name: Falonne Kuzoya Pambani
- Date of birth: 2 August 1994 (age 32)
- Place of birth: Kinshasa, Zaire
- Position: Forward

Team information
- Current team: ALG Spor
- Number: 30

Senior career*
| Years | Team | Apps | (Gls) |
- Grand Hotel
- FCF Amani
- Simba Queens
| 2023– | ALG Spor | 30 | (5) |

International career
- DR Congo
- * Club domestic league appearances and goals as of 19 November 2023

Falonne Kuzoya Pambani (born 2 August 1994) is a DR Congolese footballer who plays as a forward for Turkish Women's Football Super League club ALG Spor and the DR Congo women's national team.

== International career ==
Pambani capped for the DR Congo at senior level during the 2012 African Women's Championship.

== Controversy ==
Playing in Turkey, Pambani claimed to have been born on 2 August 1996, despite previous official registry from CAF indicating she was born on 2 August 1994. In December 2023, during the 2024 Women's Africa Cup of Nations qualification, she used the 1996 document to play against Equatorial Guinea, which had hosted the 2012 African Women's Championship, where she had used the 1994 document. After the conclusion of the round and the in-field DR Congo qualification, Pambani's irregular fielding was claimed by the Equatoguinean Football Federation, expecting CAF disqualifies DR Congo and reinstates Equatorial Guinea as a result.

== See also ==
- List of Democratic Republic of the Congo women's international footballers
