= Ghyslaine Nke =

Cameroonian footballer (born 1989)

Salomé Nke
Personal information
- Full name: Ghyslaine Salomé Nke Noah
- Date of birth: 8 June 1989 (age 37)
- Place of birth: Yaoundé, Cameroon
- Height: 1.69 m (5 ft 7 in)
- Positions: Centre back; right back; defensive midfielder

Senior career*
Years	Team	Apps	(Gls)
2005–2006	Canon Yaoundé		
2006–2008	Águilas Verdes		
2008–2010	Ákonangui		
2010–2018	Estrellas de E'Waiso Ipola		
2018–2023	Malabo Kings		
2023	Huracanes		
2024	Leones Vegetarianos		

International career^{‡}
2006–2023	Equatorial Guinea		(1)
Medal record
Women's football
Representing Equatorial Guinea
Women's Africa Cup of Nations
First place	2008 Equatorial Guinea
Second place	2010 South Africa
First place	2012 Equatorial Guinea
- * Club domestic league appearances and goals ‡ National team caps and goals as of 28 October 2012 (before the 2012 African Women's Championship)

Ghyslaine Salomé Nke Noah (born 8 June 1989), known as Salomé Nke, is a former footballer. Mainly a centre back, she could also operate as a right back and a defensive midfielder. Born and raised in Cameroon to Cameroonian parents, she has played in the Equatorial Guinean women's league and subsequently capped for the Equatorial Guinea women's national team, becoming one of the captains in her last years. She is the general director of Equatoguinean women's first tier club Reinas de Bioko FC.

== International career ==
Nke was part of the team at the 2012 African Women's Championship.

=== International goals ===
Scores and results list Equatorial Guinea's goal tally first

No.	Date	Venue	Opponent	Score	Result	Competition
1	9 June 2018	Estadio de Malabo, Malabo, Equatorial Guinea	Kenya	2–0	2–0	2018 Africa Women Cup of Nations qualification

== Honors and awards ==
=== Clubs ===
Estrellas de E'Waiso Ipola

- Liga Nacional de Fútbol Femenino: 2018

=== National team ===
Equatorial Guinea

- Africa Women Cup of Nations: 2008, 2012
