= Gabonese Football Federation =

Governing body of association football in Gabon

CAF
- Founded: 1962
- FIFA affiliation: 1966
- CAF affiliation: 1968
- President: Leon Ababe
- Website: https://fegafoot.ga

The Gabonese Football Federation (French: Fédération Gabonaise de Football, FEGAFOOT) is the governing body of football in Gabon. It was founded in 1962 and affiliated to FIFA in 1966 and the Confederation of African Football in 1968.

It organises the national football league, as well as the men's and women's national teams.
