= Gabon women's national football team =

Weemans national association football team representing Gabon

Gabon
- Association: Gabonese Football Federation
- Confederation: CAF
- Sub-confederation: UNIFFAC (Central Africa)
- Head coach: Tristan Mombo
- FIFA code: GAB
First colours	Second colours

FIFA ranking
- Current: 150 ▼1 (20 October 2026)
- Highest: 104 (July 2003)
- Lowest: 150 (August – December 2025)

First international
- São Tomé and Príncipe 0–2 Gabon (São Tomé, São Tomé and Príncipe; 10 August 2002)

Biggest win
- Gabon 6–0 São Tomé and Príncipe (Libreville, Gabon; 24 August 2002)

Biggest defeat
- Botswana 6–0 Gabon (Lobatse, Botswana; 26 September 2023); Gabon 0–6 Mali (Franceville, Gabon; 20 February 2025)

World Cup
- Appearances: 0

Olympic Games
- Appearances: 0

African Women's Championship
- Appearances: 0

The Gabon women's national football team (French: Équipe nationale féminine de football du Gabon) is the national women's football team of Gabon and is overseen by the Gabonese Football Federation. They represent Gabon in women's international football. They have never qualified for the FIFA Women's World Cup or the Africa Women’s Cup of Nations.

== History ==
The Gabon women's team first made their debut in 19??. The Gabon's women national football team have never qualified for the women's World Cup. They first entered in 1995 in the 1995 FIFA Women's World Cup, but did not qualify.

== Results and fixtures ==
The following is a list of match results in the last 12 months, as well as any future matches that have been scheduled.

=== 2026 ===
7 November 2026 Friendly	Gabon	3–6	Congo	Libreville, Gabon

10 November 2026 Friendly	Gabon	0–3	Chad	Libreville, Gabon

== Coaching staff ==
=== Current coaching staff ===
Position	Name	Ref.
Head coach	(Gabon) Tristan Mombo	

=== Managerial history ===
Mombo Tristan (20??–present)

== Players ==
=== Current squad ===
The following is the squad called up for the 2026 WAFCON qualifying First round named on 15 February 2025.

Caps and goals accurate up to and including 30 October 2021.

No.	Pos.	Player	Date of birth (age)	Club
16	GK	Elycia Mazei	15 December 2000 (age 25)	(Gabonese Football Federation) Aigles de Bélinga
	GK	Richie Mengue		(Gabonese Football Federation) AS Dikaki
1	GK	Julesca Dzialotsigue		(Gabonese Football Federation) Moanda FC
3	DF	Tatiana Obounet	18 January 2004 (age 22)	(Cyprus Football Association) Aris
5	DF	Aderick Abessolo		(Chinese Football Association) Guangzhou
18	DF	Liliane Bissaou		(Gabonese Football Federation) US Bitam
5	DF	Doris Zamba		(Gabonese Football Federation) Sporting CLub Nyanga
5	DF	Paule Nse Mvome	12 April 2005 (age 21)	(Equatoguinean Football Federation) 15 de Agosto
	DF	Loise Abolo Ava		(Gabonese Football Federation) Vautour Fc
5	DF	Madeleine Zeng Abessolo		(Gabonese Football Federation) Athletico Akanda
21	MF	Grace Aloung Mba		(Gabonese Football Federation) Cercle Sportif de Bendje
6	MF	Alexandrie Sedieu	15 July 2001 (age 25)	(Cyprus Football Association) Aris
21	MF	Laschwana Assengone Mvie		(Royal Moroccan Football Federation) Union Sidi Slimaine
2	MF	Jeannie Ntsame Ondo		(Gabonese Football Federation) Athletic Akanda
12	FW	Elvina Ntogone Mezui	20 November 2002 (age 23)	(Gabonese Football Federation) Vautour FC
2	MF	Suzanne Sendze Mbirama		(Gabonese Football Federation) Sporting Club Nyanga
11	MF	Reine Edzoumou	1 February 1996 (age 30)	(Gabonese Football Federation) Missiles FC
22	MF	Nelle Bivigou Bivgou		(Gabonese Football Federation) béto
22	FW	Coralie Eyeang Nguema		(Rwanda Football Federation) AS Kigali
17	FW	Victoire Biatholi	14 May 2003 (age 23)	(Cyprus Football Association) Aris
19	FW	Amira Nze		(Royal Moroccan Football Federation) Wydad AC
	FW	Claudia Ada Abessolo		(Gabonese Football Federation) Tristar
	FW	Naomi Kayoug Ontsia		(Gabonese Football Federation) Sporting

=== Recent call-ups ===
The following players have been called up to a Gabon squad in the past 12 months.

Pos.	Player	Date of birth (age)	Caps	Goals	Club	Latest call-up

== Records ==
*Active players in bold, statistics correct as of 19 September 2021.

=== Most capped players ===
#	Player	Year(s)	Caps

=== Top goalscorers ===
#	Player	Year(s)	Goals	Caps

== Competitive record ==
Champions Runners-up Third place Fourth place

=== FIFA Women's World Cup ===
FIFA Women's World Cup record
Year	Result	Pld	W	D*	L	GS	GA	GD
(China) 1991	Did not enter							
(Sweden) 1995	Did not qualify							
(United States) 1999	Did not qualify							
(United States) 2003	Did not qualify							
(China) 2007	Did not qualify							
(Germany) 2011	Did not qualify							
(Canada) 2015	Did not qualify							
(France) 2019	Did not qualify							
(Australia) (New Zealand) 2023	Did not qualify							
(Brazil) 2027	Did not qualify							
Total	0/10	0	0	0	0	0	0	0

*Draws include knockout matches decided on penalty kicks.

=== Olympic Games ===
Summer Olympics record
Year	Result	Pld	W	D*	L	GS	GA	GD
(United States) 1996	Did not qualify							
(Australia) 2000	Did not qualify							
(Greece) 2004	Did not qualify							
(China) 2008	Did not qualify							
(United Kingdom) 2012	Did not qualify							
(Brazil) 2016	Did not qualify							
(Japan) 2020	Did not qualify							
(France) 2024	Did not qualify							
Total	0/8	0	0	0	0	0	0	0

*Draws include knockout matches decided on penalty kicks.

=== Africa Women Cup of Nations ===
Africa Women Cup of Nations
Year	Round	GP	W	D*	L	GS	GA	GD
1991 to (Nigeria) 2018	Did not enter							
2020	Cancelled due to COVID-19 pandemic in Africa							
(Morocco) 2022	Did not qualify							
(Morocco) 2024	Did not qualify							
**Total**	0/7	0	0	0	0	0	0	0

(The former format was amended as it did not comply with MOS:FLAG as discussed here)

*Draws include knockout matches decided on penalty kicks.

=== African Games ===
African Games record
Year	Result	Matches	Wins	Draws	Losses	GF	GA
(Nigeria) 2003	Did not enter						
(Algeria) 2007	Did not enter						
(Mozambique) 2011	Did not qualify						
(Republic of the Congo) 2015	To Be Determined						
(Morocco) 2019	Did not enter						
(Ghana) 2023	Did not qualify						
Total	0/4	0	0	0	0	0	0

=== UNIFFAC Women's Cup ===
UNIFFAC Women's Cup
Year	Result	Matches	Wins	Draws	Losses	GF	GA	GD
(Equatorial Guinea) 2020	Third	4	0	3	1	4	5	−1
Total	1/1	4	0	3	1	4	5	−1

== All−time record against FIFA recognized nations ==
The list shown below shows the Djibouti national football team all−time international record against opposing nations.
*As of xxxxxx after match against xxxx.

Key

Positive balance (more wins than losses)
Neutral balance (as many wins as losses)
Negative balance (more losses than wins)

Against	Pld	W	D	L	GF	GA	GD	Confederation

=== Record per opponent ===
*As ofxxxxx after match against xxxxx.

Key

Positive balance (more wins than losses)
Neutral balance (as many wins as losses)
Negative balance (more losses than wins)

The following table shows Djibouti's all-time official international record per opponent:

Opponent	Pld	W	D	L	GF	GA	GD	W%	Confederation
Total									—

== See also ==
- Gabon national football team, the men's team
- Sport in Gabon
  - Football in Gabon
    - Women's football in Gabon
