= Celestina Manga =

Equatoguinean footballer (born 2002)

Personal information
- Full name: Celestina Manga Besecu
- Date of birth: 12 September 2002 (age 24)
- Place of birth: Cameroon
- Height: 1.60 m (5 ft 3 in)
- Position: Attacking midfielder

Team information
- Current team: SC Nyanga

Senior career*
| Years | Team | Apps | (Gls) |
| 2018 | Super Leonas | | |
| 2019 | Malabo Kings | | |
| 2021 | SC Nyanga | | |
| 2023 | → Vautour (loan) | | |
| 2023–2024 | Aris Limassol | 8 | (3) |
| 2024–2025 | SC Nyanga | | |
| 2026– | USFA | | |

International career^{‡}
| 2019 | Equatorial Guinea U20 | | |
| 2018– | Equatorial Guinea | 11 | (2) |
- * Club domestic league appearances and goals as of 17 December 2023 ‡ National team caps and goals as of 20 June 2019

Celestina Manga Besecu (born 12 September 2002) is a footballer who plays as an attacking midfielder for Burkinabé Women's Championship club USFA. Born in Cameroon, she plays for the Equatorial Guinea national team.

== Early life ==
Celestina Manga Besecu was born in Cameroon to an Equatoguinean Kombe father from Punta Mbonda and a Cameroonian mother. She always loved playing football in her childhood which lead to her becoming a professional footballer.

== Club career ==
Manga started her career with FC Super Leonas and has played with Malabo Kings FC since 2018.

In February 2023, she moved to Gabon to play for SC Nyanga, being loaned to Vautour shortly after. By late June 2023, she had already scored 22 goals and made 16 assists.

== International career ==
At the age of 19 Manga represented Equatorial Guinea at under-20 level at the 2019 African Games.

Manga competed for Equatorial Guinea at the 2018 Africa Women Cup of Nations, playing in three matches. She played for a total of 270 minutes, but her team suffered from bad results: a 0–5 defeat against Zambia on 18 November, a 7–1 defeat against South Africa on 21 November and a 6–0 defeat against Nigeria on 24 November.

She lost against Tunisia 7–3 in total in the second round of the 2022 Africa Women Cup of Nations qualification.

== Personal life ==
Manga Besecu is 160 cm.
