= Chad women's national football team =

Women's national association football team representing Chad

Chad
- Nickname: Les Sao Dames
- Association: Chadian Football Federation
- Confederation: CAF (Africa)
- Sub-confederation: UNIFFAC (Central Africa)
- Head coach: Galleboui Nagoya Aimée
- Captain: Edith Nangadoum
- Top scorer: Solange Larkingam (10)
- FIFA code: CHA

FIFA ranking
- Current: 156 (20 October 2026)
- Highest: 156 (December 2025 – April 2026)
- Lowest: 156 (December 2025 – April 2026)

First international
- Algeria 2–0 Chad (Blida, Algeria; 4 April 2019)

Biggest win
- Chad 16–0 Libya (Berrechid, Morocco; 29 October 2025)

Biggest defeat
- Ethiopia 6–0 Chad (Addis Ababa, Ethiopia; 13 July 2023)

The Chad women's national football team is the national women's football team of Chad and is overseen by the Chadian Football Federation.

== History ==
A women's football programme was first organised in Chad in 1986. Although as of 2009, there was no women's domestic league or women's national team at any level in Chad.

On 4 April 2019, the Chad women's national football team played their first international match against Algeria, for the 2020 CAF Women's Olympic Qualifying Tournament.

== Background and development ==
The development of women's football on the continent has been lacking a result of several factors, including limited access to education, poverty amongst women in the wider society, and fundamental inequality present in the society that occasions female human rights abuses. Funding also in an impediment, with most funding for women's football in Africa coming from FIFA instead of the national football association. If quality female footballers do develop, many leave the continent seeking greater opportunity in Northern Europe or the United States.

With a FIFA trigramme of CHA, Chad has limited female participation in football having only 1,010 registered female footballers in 2006. Rights to broadcast the 2011 Women's World Cup in the country were bought by the African Union of Broadcasting.

On 30 October 2025, Chad trashed Libya with a result of 16-0, which marked their biggest victory as to date.

== Results and fixtures ==
The following is a list of match results in the last 12 months, as well as any future matches that have been scheduled.

- Source: Match results of Chad women's, FTFA.td (in French)

Legend

Win Draw Loss Void and postponed Fixture

=== 2025 ===
26 October 2025 FIFA Unites Women's Series	Afghan Women United (Afghanistan)	1–6	Chad	Berrechid, Morocco
17:00 UTC+1	Noori 4' (pen.)	Report	Djoïtana 44'; Abdoulaye 53'; Dallou 60', 73'; Larkingam 62', 81'	Stadium: Berrechid Municipal Stadium; Referee: Nouhaila Belkhoukh (Morocco)

29 October 2025 FIFA Unites Women's Series	Chad	16–0	Libya	Berrechid, Morocco
17:00 UTC+1	Abdoulaye 6', 32', 59'; Dallou 8', 50', 62'; Larkingam 10', 14', 45+3', 55'; Azinda 45+1'; Tchinsou 68'; Akouya 71'; Dionkane 74'; Menda 81'; Lemta 82'	Report		Stadium: Berrechid Municipal Stadium; Referee: Khuloud Khudoum (UAE)

1 November 2025 FIFA Unites Women's Series	Chad	1–0	Tunisia	Berrechid, Morocco
20:00 UTC+1	Larkingam 29'	Report		Stadium: Berrechid Municipal Stadium; Referee: Haneen Murad (Jordan

=== 2026 ===
4 November 2026 Friendly	Chad	1–1	Central African Republic	Libreville, Gabon

10 November 2026 Friendly	Gabon	0–3	Chad	Libreville, Gabon

== Managers ==
- Amane Adoum (2023–present)

== Players ==
=== Current squad ===
The following 23 players were named to the squad for the FIFA Unites Women's Series 2025 in Berrechid, Morocco from 26 October to 1 November 2025.

No.	Pos.	Player	Date of birth (age)	Club
1	GK	Carine Dénéram	1998 (age 27–28)	(Chadian Football Federation) Star J. Talents
16	GK	Kaltouma Djamen	1996 (age 29–30)	(Chadian Football Federation) TP Elect Sport
22	GK	Béatrice Allaissem	1998 (age 27–28)	(Chadian Football Federation) TP Elect Sport
2	DF	Beral Noudjikouambaye (Captain)	25 October	(Chadian Football Federation) TP Elect Sport
3	DF	Salamatou Tchinsou	27 February 1997 (age 29)	(Royal Moroccan Football Federation) Raja Aïn Harrouda
4	DF	Tamar Mamadji	1999 (age 26–27)	(Chadian Football Federation) TP Elect Sport
5		Haoua Idriss		(Chadian Football Federation) TP Elect Sport
6	MF	Karmel Mbawaye	2000 (age 25–26)	(Chadian Football Federation) TP Elect Sport
7	MF	Achta Akouya	10 December 1997 (age 28)	(Chadian Football Federation) TP Elect Sport
8	MF	Adeline Azinda	2004 (age 21–22)	(Cameroonian Football Federation) Cyclone FC
9	FW	Juliette Djoïtana	1999 (age 26–27)	(Chadian Football Federation) DAF
10	FW	Solange Larkingam	11 August 2002 (age 24)	(Royal Moroccan Football Federation) Raja Aïn Harrouda
11	MF	Kani Mahamat Abdoulaye	2002 (age 23–24)	(Royal Moroccan Football Federation) FC Saidia
12		Farida Lemta		(Chadian Football Federation) TP Elect Sport
13	MF	Fatimè Dallou	1997 (age 28–29)	(Chadian Football Federation) TP Elect Sport
14	FW	Claudia Sigrom	2001 (age 24–25)	(Chadian Football Federation) TP Elect Sport
15		Lysiane Memadji		(Chadian Football Federation) Gazelle FC
17	MF	Brigitte Nelem	2000 (age 25–26)	(Chadian Football Federation) DAF
18		Dimanche Menda		(Chadian Football Federation) TP Elect Sport
19		Épiphanie Nepitimabye		(Chadian Football Federation) INJS
20		Geneviève Dionkane		(Chadian Football Federation) TP Elect Sport
21		Marie Toukoua		(Chadian Football Federation) TP Elect Sport
23		Rakhie Saleh Morgogde		(Chadian Football Federation) DAF

== Competitive record ==
=== FIFA Women's World Cup ===
FIFA Women's World Cup record
Year	Result	GP	W	D*	L	GF	GA	GD
(China) 1991 to (Canada) 2015	Did not exist							
(France) 2019	Did not enter							
(Australia) (New Zealand) 2023	Did not enter							
(Brazil) 2027	Withdrew							
(Costa Rica) (Jamaica) (Mexico) (United States) 2031	To be determined							
(United Kingdom) 2035	To be determined							
Total	0/10	-	-	-	-	-	-	-

=== Olympic Games ===
Summer Olympics record
Year	Result	GP	W	D*	L	GF	GA	GD
(United States) 1996 to (Brazil) 2016	Did not exist							
(Japan) 2020 to (France) 2024	Did not qualify							
Total	0/8	-	-	-	-	-	-	-

=== Africa Women Cup of Nations ===
Africa Women Cup of Nations record
Year	Result	Matches	Wins	Draws	Losses	GF	GA
1991 to (Ghana) 2018	Did not exist						
(Republic of the Congo) 2020	cancelled due to COVID-19						
(Morocco) 2022	Did not enter						
(Morocco) 2024	Withdrew						
(Morocco) 2026	Withdrew						
Total	0/14						

*Draws include knockout matches decided on penalty kicks.

=== African Games ===
African Games record
Year	Round	GP	W	D	L	GS	GA
(Nigeria) 2003 to (Republic of the Congo) 2015	Did not exist						
(Morocco) 2019	See Chad women's national under-20 football team						
(Ghana) 2023	See Chad women's national under-20 football team						
Total	0/4	0	0	0	0	0	0

=== UNIFFAC Women's Cup ===
UNIFFAC Women's Cup
Year	Result	Matches	Wins	Draws	Losses	GF	GA	GD
(Equatorial Guinea) 2020	4th	4	0	3	1	5	7	−2
Total	1/1	4	0	3	1	5	7	−2

== Honours ==
- FIFA Unites Women's Series

(gold) Champions: 2025

== See also ==
- Chad national football team, the men's team
