= Exaucée Kizinga =

DR Congolese footballer

Personal information
- Full name: Exaucée Kizinga Ndjoli
- Date of birth: 31 January 2004 (age 22)
- Place of birth: Kinshasa, DR Congo
- Height: 1.63 m (5 ft 4 in)
- Positions: Left winger; left back

Senior career*
Years	Team	Apps	(Gls)
- Éclat Sport
2022–2023	Ataşehir Belediyespor	1	(1)
2023	Newcastle Jets	0	(0)

International career
- DR Congo U20
2019–	DR Congo		
- * Club domestic league appearances and goals as of 2 February 2022

Exaucée Kizinga Ndjoli (born 31 January 2004), known as Exaucée Kizinga, is a DR Congolese footballer, who last played as a left winger and a left back for Newcastle Jets in the A-League Women, and the DR Congo women's national team.

== Club career ==
In 2022, Kizinga moved to Turkey to play in the Turkish Women's Super League for Ataşehir Belediyespor.

In November 2023, Kizinga joined Australian club Newcastle Jets. She left the club 18 days after joining without making an appearance.

== International career ==
Kizinga capped for the DR Congo at senior level during the 2020 CAF Women's Olympic Qualifying Tournament (third round).

== See also ==
- List of Democratic Republic of the Congo women's international footballers
