= Marlène Kasaj =

DR Congolese footballer (born 1996)

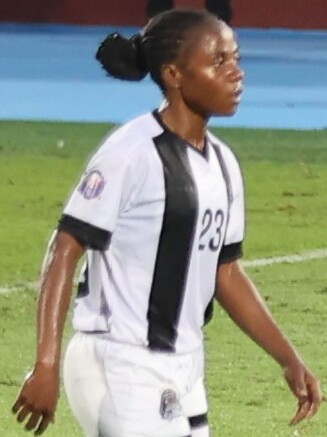
- Kasaj during the 2024 CAF WCL final.

Personal information
- Full name: Marlène Kasaj Yav
- Date of birth: 25 January 1996 (age 30)
- Place of birth: Lubumbashi, Zaire
- Height: 1.61 m (5 ft 3 in)
- Position: Attacking midfielder

Team information
- Current team: TP Mazembe
- Number: 23

Senior career*
Years	Team	Apps	(Gls)
- AC Léopards
- Amani
2021–2022	Adana İdmanyurduspor	19	(10)
2022–2023	ALG Spor	4	(0)
2023	Adana İdmanyurduspor	7	(2)
2023–2024	Beylerbeyi	13	(1)
2024–	TP Mazembe		

International career
2015	DR Congo U20		
2019–	DR Congo	7	(0)
- * Club domestic league appearances and goals as of 23 December 2023

Marlène Kasaj Yav (born 25 January 1996) is a DR Congolese footballer who plays as an attacking midfielder for LINAFF club TP Mazembe and the DR Congo national team.

== Club career ==
Kasaj has played for AC Léopards in the Republic of the Congo and for Amani in the Democratic Republic of the Congo.

In 2021, she moved to Turkey to join the Turkish Women's Super League club Adana İdmanyurduspor.

On 7 July 2022, she transferred to the Gaziantep-based league champion Turkish club ALG Spor. She debuted in the 2022–23 UEFA Women's Champions League on 18 August 2022.

== International career ==
Kasaj capped for the DR Congo at senior level during the 2020 CAF Women's Olympic Qualifying Tournament (third round).

== Career statistics ==
=== Club ===
As of match played 29 October 2022.

Club	Season	League			Continental		National		Total	
Club	Season	Division	Apps	Goals	Apps	Goals	Apps	Goals	Apps	Goals
Adana İdmanyurduspor	2021–22	Super League	19	10	–	–			19	10
Adana İdmanyurduspor	Total		19	10					19	10
ALG Spor	2022–23	Super League	3	0	1	0			4	0
ALG Spor	Total		3	0	1	0			4	0

=== International goals ===
Scores and results list DR Congo's goal tally first, score column indicates score after each Kasaj goal.

List of international goals scored by Marlène Kasaj
No.	Date	Venue	Opponent	Score	Result	Competition
1	12 April 2026	Ratchaburi Stadium, Ratchaburi, Thailand	Indonesia	3–1	7–1	2026 FIFA Series

== Honours ==
TP Mazembe

- CAF Women's Champions League: 2024

== See also ==
- List of Democratic Republic of the Congo women's international footballers
