= Ruth Kipoyi =

DR Congolese footballer (born 1997)

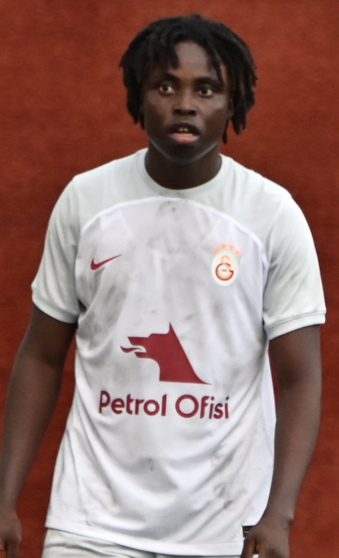
- Kipoyi with Galatasaray in 2023

Personal information
- Full name: Ruth Monique Kipoyi
- Date of birth: 15 October 1997 (age 29)
- Place of birth: Kinshasa, DR Congo
- Position: Forward

Team information
- Current team: Al-Nassr
- Number: 11

Senior career*
Years	Team	Apps	(Gls)
- Promesse Star
- TP Mazembe
2021	Simba Queens		
2021–2023	ALG Spor	43	(28)
2023–2024	Galatasaray	26	(9)
2024–	Al-Nassr	13	(8)

International career
2015	DR Congo U20		
2019–	DR Congo		
- * Club domestic league appearances and goals as of 7 March 2025

Ruth Monique Kipoyi (born 15 October 1997) is a DR Congolese footballer who plays as a forward for Saudi Women's Premier League club Al-Nassr and the DR Congo national team.

== Club career ==
On 15 July 2021, Kipoyi signed for Tanzanian women's football team Simba Queens, representing the club in the 2021 CAF Women's Champions League CECAFA Qualifiers. The side finished third, failing to qualify for the inaugural CAF Women's Champions League finals.

=== ALG Spor ===
In December 2021, she moved to Turkey and joined the Gaziantep-based club ALG Spor to play in the 2021-22 Turkcell Women's Super League. On 9 March 2022 she scored her first professional hat-trick with three goals in a 7-0 league win over Dudullu Spor. She enjoyed the 2021-22 Women's Super League champion title of her team. On 18 August 2022, she debuted in the 2022–23 UEFA Women's Champions League.

=== Galatasaray ===
She signed a one-year contract with Galatasaray on 4 August 2023.

== International career ==
Kipoyi capped for the DR Congo at senior level during the 2020 CAF Women's Olympic Qualifying Tournament (third round). She was selected for the DR Congo squad for their 2022 CAF Africa Women Cup of Nations qualification fixture with Equatorial Guinea prior to the side's withdrawal citing logistical and financial issues.

== Career statistics ==
As of match played 10 September 2024

Club	Season	League			Continental		National		Total	
Club	Season	Division	Apps	Goals	Apps	Goals	Apps	Goals	Apps	Goals
Simba Queens	2021	Tanzanian Premier League	0	0	4	0			4	0
Simba Queens	Total		0	0	4	0			4	0
ALG Spor	2021-22	Super League	24	21	0	0	0		24	21
ALG Spor	2022–23	Super League	19	7	0	0			19	7
ALG Spor	Total		43	28	0	0			43	28
Galatasaray	2023-24	Super League	26	9	0	0	0		26	9
Galatasaray	Total		26	9	0	0			26	9
Galatasaray	Career total		69	37	4	0	0	0	73	37

== Honours ==
Turkish Women's Football Super League

ALG Spor
Winners (1): 2021-22

== See also ==
- List of Democratic Republic of the Congo women's international footballers
