= Central African Republic women's national football team =

Women's national association football team representing Central African Republic

Central African Republic
- Association: Central African Football Federation
- Confederation: CAF (Africa)
- Sub-confederation: UNIFFAC (Central Africa)
- Head coach: Majoka Line
- Captain: Christelle Demba
- Top scorer: Christelle Demba (3)
- FIFA code: CTA
First colours	Second colours

FIFA ranking
- Current: 148 ▼4 (20 October 2026)
- Highest: 142 (August 2025)
- Lowest: 146 (June 2024)

First international
- Senegal 4–0 Central African Republic (Dakar, Senegal; 19 February 2006)

Biggest win
- Central African Republic 9–0 São Tomé and Príncipe (Libreville, Gabon; 7 November 2026)

Biggest defeat
- Central African Republic 0–8 Algeria (Algiers, Algeria; 9 October 2026)

The Central African Republic women's national football team represents the Central African Republic (CAR) in international women's football. It is governed by the Central African Football Federation. It played its first international matches in 2018 in the Cup of Nations qualifiers. The country's youth national team has played in several matches and events, including an Under-19 World Cup qualifying competition in which the team lost in the semi-finals. As is the case across Africa, the women's game faces numerous challenges. Football was only formally organised in 2000, and there are only 400 players competing at the national level.

== History ==
=== Background and development ===
The development of women's football in Africa faces several challenges, including limited access to education, poverty amongst women, inequalities and human rights abuses targeting women. Many quality players leave the country seeking greater opportunity in Europe or the United States. In addition, most of the funding for women's football in Africa comes from FIFA, not the local national football associations.

The Central African Football Federation, the CAR's national football association, was founded in 1961 and became a FIFA affiliate in 1964. In the CAR, there is no national association staffer dedicated to women's football and no women on the board or in the executive committee. With assistance from FIFA, the federation developed a women's programme starting in 2000. A national competition and school competition were later introduced. Football is one of the most popular women's sports in the CAR. There were about 200 registered youth players in the country and 200 registered senior players as of 2006. There are 80 club-level teams with women on them, 20 of which are exclusively for women.

=== Team ===
In 2006, the team trained five times a week. As of March 2020, the team was not ranked by FIFA due to it not having played enough international matches.

The country has a national under-20 side. This team has participated in the qualifying competition for the FIFA U-20 Women's World Cup, which prior to 2006 was an under-19 tournament in which the CAR team also took part. In 2002, the qualifiers began with an African Women's Under-19 Championship. The CAR faced Equatorial Guinea in a home-and-away series in the first round, winning both matches by scores of 1–0 and 2–0. The country was set to play Zimbabwe in the quarterfinals, but Zimbabwe withdrew from the competition. In the semi-finals, the CAR met South Africa in a home match, but lost 0–2. The team was scheduled to play a return match in South Africa, but the host country refused to grant the Central African players visas, which led to South Africa's disqualification from the tournament. South Africa appealed the decision and visas were subsequently issued to Central African players, but the team then withdrew from the competition. In 2010, the Central African Republic women's national under-20 football team participated in the African Women's U-20 World Cup qualifiers. They had a walkover win against São Tomé and Príncipe in the first round but did not participate in the second or third rounds.

== Results and fixtures ==
The following is a list of match results in the last 12 months, as well as any future matches that have been scheduled.

Win Draw Lose Fixture

=== 2026 ===
9 October 2028 OG qualifying	Central African Republic	0–8	Algeria	Algiers, Algeria
18:00 UTC+1			Ndoumba 20' (o.g.); Dafeur 26'; Boussaha 29'; Bekhaled 36'; Naili 51'; Belloumou 67'; Bendris 80'; Bahlouli 90'	Stadium: 5 July 1962 Stadium; Referee: Seonyatseng Tshephe (Botswana)

13 October 2028 OG qualifying	Algeria	7–0	Central African Republic	Tizi Ouzou, Algeria
18:00 UTC+1	Bendris 2', 52'; Bethi 4', 44'; Dafeur 39' (pen.); Bekhaled 60' (pen.); Smaali 64'			Stadium: Hocine Aït Ahmed Stadium; Referee: Aida Sy (Senegal)

4 November 2026 Friendly	Chad	1–1	Central African Republic	Libreville, Gabon

7 November 2026 Friendly	Central African Republic	9–0	São Tomé and Príncipe	Libreville, Gabon

10 November 2026 Friendly	Central African Republic	1–1	Congo	Libreville, Gabon

== Coaching staff ==
=== Current coaching staff ===
As of September 2022

Position	Name	Ref.
Head coach	Jean Etienne Momokoamas Kopo	
Assistant coach	Christelle MAJOKA	

=== Manager history ===
- Jean Etienne Momokoamas Kopo (??– )

== Players ==
=== Current squad ===
The following players were called up for the 2024 Women's Africa Cup of Nations qualification matches against Mali.

- Match dates: 22 and 26 September 2023
- Opposition: Mali
- Caps and goals correct as of: 24 October 2021, after the match against Cameroon

No.	Pos.	Player	Date of birth (age)	Caps	Goals	Club
	GK	Beverly Mellot				(Cameroonian Football Federation) Louves Minproff
	GK	Fidélia Wabangue				
	GK	Pétula Malengao				
	DF	Félicité Yakite				
	DF	Marie Auzingoni Toudouma				
	DF	Awa Victoire Rafina Wagouma				
	DF	Chancie Dangoro				
	DF	Gladys Mokogo				
	DF	Huguette Gabriella Gazambele				
	DF	Noëlla Sylviana Mokossi				(Royal Moroccan Football Federation) Renaissance Club Athletic Zemamra
	MF	Ursula Ndomette				
	MF	Ernestine Yemele				
	MF	Ornella Estelle Soubama				
	MF	Félicité Dongole Tido				
	MF	Sandrine Doimon Tabita				
	MF	Foxia Tania Nigel Gbadora Mbagcao				
	FW	Duviella Padou				
	FW	Dorcas Noëlla Kokate Yaowa				(Cameroonian Football Federation) Canon Yaoundé
	FW	Annette Delalune Merline Youngai				(Cameroonian Football Federation) AS Awa
	FW	Marie Paul Ndogo Passe				
	FW	Areille Prudence Bokognako				
	FW	Grâce Yinda				
	FW	Christelle Demba	26 February 1998 (age 28)	10	3	(Latvian Football Federation) Riga FC
	FW	Jasmine Ndada				

=== Recent call-ups ===
The following players have been called up to a Central African squad in the past 12 months.

Pos.	Player	Date of birth (age)	Caps	Goals	Club	Latest call-up

== Individual records ==
- Active players in **bold**, statistics correct **as of 2020**.

=== Most capped players ===
#	Player	Year(s)	Caps

=== Top goalscorers ===
As of 26 September 2023

#	Player	Year(s)	Goals	Caps
**1**	Christelle Demba	2018–present	3	10
**2**	Florencia Yamale	2018–	1	?

== Achievements ==
=== Women's World Cup record ===
Women's World Cup finals									Women's World Cup qualification					
Year	Result	Position	Pld	W	D	L	GF	GA	Pld	W	D	L	GF	GA
(China) 1991	Did Not Enter								–	–	–	–	–	–
(Sweden) 1995	Did Not Enter								–	–	–	–	–	–
(United States) 1999	Did Not Enter								–	–	–	–	–	–
(United States) 2003	Did Not Enter								–	–	–	–	–	–
(China) 2007	Did Not Enter								–	–	–	–	–	–
(Germany) 2011	Did Not Enter								–	–	–	–	–	–
(Canada) 2015	Did Not Enter								–	–	–	–	–	–
(France) 2019	Did not qualify								2	0	1	1	1	3
(Australia) (New Zealand) 2023	Did not qualify								2	0	0	2	0	3
(Brazil) 2027	Did not enter								Did not enter					
Total	–	–	–	–	–	–	–	–	4	0	1	3	1	6

=== Olympic Games record ===
Olympic Games finals									Olympic Games qualification					
Year	Result	Position	Pld	W	D	L	GF	GA	Pld	W	D	L	GF	GA
(United States) 1996	Ineligible								–	–	–	–	–	–
(Australia) 2000	Ineligible								–	–	–	–	–	–
(Greece) 2004	Did Not Enter								–	–	–	–	–	–
(China) 2008	Did Not Enter								–	–	–	–	–	–
(United Kingdom) 2012	Did Not Enter								–	–	–	–	–	–
(Brazil) 2016	Did Not Enter								–	–	–	–	–	–
(Japan) 2020	Did Not Enter								–	–	–	–	–	–
(France) 2024	Did Not Enter								–	–	–	–	–	–
(United States) 2028	To be determined								–	–	–	–	–	–
Total	–	–	–	–	–	–	–	–	–	–	–	–	–	–

=== Women's Africa Cup of Nations ===
Women's Africa Cup of Nations
Year	Result	Pld	W	D	L	GF	GA
1995	Did not enter						
(Nigeria) 1998	Did not enter						
(South Africa) 2000	Did not enter						
(Nigeria) 2002	Did not enter						
(South Africa) 2004	Did not enter						
(Nigeria) 2006	Did not enter						
(Equatorial Guinea) 2008	Did not enter						
(South Africa) 2010	Did not enter						
(Equatorial Guinea) 2012	Did not enter						
(Namibia) 2014	Did not enter						
(Cameroon) 2016	Did not enter						
(Ghana) 2018	Did not qualify						
(Morocco) 2022	Did not qualify						
(Morocco) 2024	Did not qualify						
(Morocco) 2026	Did not enter						
Total	0/16	0	0	0	0	0	0

=== African Games record ===
African Games finals									African Games qualification					
Year	Result	Position	Pld	W	D	L	GF	GA	Pld	W	D	L	GF	GA
(Nigeria) 2003	Did Not Enter								No Qualifying Process					
(Algeria) 2007	Did Not Enter								–	–	–	–	–	–
(Mozambique) 2011	Did Not Enter								–	–	–	–	–	–
(Republic of the Congo) 2015	Did Not Enter								–	–	–	–	–	–
(Morocco) 2019	See the U-20 team								See the U-20 team					
(Ghana) 2023	See the U-20 team								See the U-20 team					
Total	–	–	–	–	–	–	–	–	–	–	–	–	–	–

- 2019 and 2023 editions of the football tournament was played by the U-20 teams.

=== UNIFFAC Women's Cup ===
UNIFFAC Women's Cup
Year	Result	Matches	Wins	Draws	Losses	GF	GA	GD
(Equatorial Guinea) 2020	Third	4	0	2	2	2	9	−7
Total	1/1	4	0	3	1	4	5	−1

== See also ==
- Central African Republic national football team, the men's team
