= DR Congo women's national football team =

Women's national association football team representing DR Congo

Democratic Republic of the Congo
- Nickname(s): Léopards dames (Leopardesses)
- Association: Congolese Association Football Federation (FECOFA)
- Confederation: CAF (Africa)
- Sub-confederation: UNIFFAC (Central Africa)
- Head coach: Hervé Happy
- Captain: Fideline Ngoy
- Home stadium: Stade des Martyrs, Kinshasa
- FIFA code: COD
First colours	Second colours

FIFA ranking
- Current: 106 ▼1 (16 June 2026)
- Highest: 85 (June – September 2009)
- Lowest: 118 (September 2019)

First international
- DR Congo 4–1 Egypt (Kaduna, Nigeria; 17 October 1998)

Biggest win
- Indonesia 1–7 DR Congo (Ratchaburi, Thailand; 12 April 2026)

Biggest defeat
- Nigeria 6–0 DR Congo (Kaduna, Nigeria; 20 October 1998); Equatorial Guinea 6–0 DR Congo (Malabo, Equatorial Guinea; 31 October 2012)

Women's Africa Cup of Nations
- Appearances: 4 (first in 1998)
- Best result: Third place (1998)

UNIFFAC Women's Cup
- Appearances: 1 (first in 2020)
- Best result: Runners-up (2020)

The DR Congo women's national football team (French: Équipe nationale féminine de football de la République démocratique du Congo) represents the Democratic Republic of the Congo in international women's football. It is governed by the Congolese Association Football Federation. FIFA refers to DR Congo as Congo DR.

== History ==
Congo DR returned to compete in the CAF qualifiers for the 2020 Summer Olympics in Tokyo. Their second round opponent, Equatorial Guinea withdrew, seeing Congo DR through to the third round to face Cameroon. After suffering a 0–2 loss in the first leg at Yaoundé, Congo DR built a 2–0 lead at home only to see a late goal by Ajara Nchout knock them out of the tournament with a 2–3 loss on aggregate.

== Team image ==
=== Home stadium ===
The DR Congo women's national football team plays their home matches on the Stade des Martyrs.

== Results and fixtures ==
The following is a list of match results in the last 12 months, as well as any future matches that have been scheduled.

Legend

Win Draw Lose Fixture

=== 2025 ===
22 October WAFCON 2026 Q	DR Congo	1–1	South Africa	Kinshasa, DR Congo
17:00	Kipoyi 45+1'		Mohlakoana 42'	Stadium: Stade des Martyrs

28 October WAFCON 2026 Q	South Africa	1–0	DR Congo	Johannesburg, South Africa
19:00	Kgatlana 90+1'			Stadium: Dobsonville Stadium

=== 2026 ===
12 April 2026 FIFA Series	Indonesia	1–7	DR Congo	Ratchaburi, Thailand
16:00	Scheunemann 7' (pen.)	Report (FIFA)	Kanjinga 23', 59'; Mawete 29', 74'; Kasaj 45+6'; Massombo 52'; Feza 82'	Stadium: Ratchaburi Stadium; Referee: Pansa Chaisanit (Thailand)

15 April 2026 FIFA Series	Thailand	2–0	DR Congo	Ratchaburi, Thailand
20:30 UTC+7	Mårtensson 60'; Wiranya 90+4'	Report (FIFA)		Stadium: Ratchaburi Stadium; Referee: Kim Yu-jeong (South Korea)

== Coaching staff ==
=== Current coaching staff ===
Position	Name	Ref.
Head coach	Papy Kimoto	

== Players ==
=== Current squad ===
The following players were called up for the 2026 Women's Africa Cup of Nations qualification match against South Africa on 28 October 2025.

No.	Pos.	Player	Date of birth (age)	Club
1	GK	Fideline Ngoy (captain)	31 March 1991 (age 35)	(Congolese Association Football Federation) FC Mazembe
16	GK	Ruth Khonde	10 October 1998 (age 28)	(Congolese Association Football Federation) FC Mazembe
24	GK	Nyota Kalume		(Congolese Association Football Federation) FC Lupopo
3	DF	Belange Vukulu	16 December 1997 (age 28)	(Congolese Association Football Federation) FC Mazembe
5	DF	Aimeraude Mawanda	25 March 1998 (age 28)	(Congolese Association Football Federation) FA Mschiana
6	DF	Alphonsine Kapinga		(Congolese Association Football Federation) FA Mschiana
2	DF	Yvonne Obonga		(Congolese Association Football Federation) FA Mschiana
15	DF	Vanessa Mwila		(Congolese Association Football Federation) OCL
13	DF	Valentine Muwenga		(Congolese Association Football Federation) FC Les Aigles
8	MF	Bénie Kubiena	7 May 1999 (age 27)	(Chinese Football Association) Shanghai RCS
14	MF	Marlène Kasaj	25 January 1996 (age 30)	(Congolese Association Football Federation) FC Mazembe
10	MF	Éva Sumo	7 December 1993 (age 32)	(French Football Federation) FC Nantes
12	MF	Esther Siluvangi	8 February 2001 (age 25)	(French Football Federation) OGC Nice
18	MF	Grâce Mfwamba	17 September 1998 (age 28)	(Saudi Arabian Football Federation) Al Taraji
20	MF	Sarah Yasongamo	15 August 1998 (age 28)	(Turkish Football Federation) 1207 Antalya Spor
9	FW	Esther Dikisha	31 December 1998 (age 27)	(Congolese Association Football Federation) FA Mschiana
11	FW	Naomie Kaba-Kaba	4 February 1998 (age 28)	(Saudi Arabian Football Federation) Al Ahli
7	FW	Ruth Kipoyi	15 October 1997 (age 28)	(Saudi Arabian Football Federation) Al Nassr
17	FW	Gloria Rabomba	19 March 1998 (age 28)	(French Football Federation) AJ Auxerre
19	FW	Vivine Makasi	1 February 2003 (age 23)	(Congolese Association Football Federation) FC Mazembe
22	FW	Olga Massombo	20 April 1999 (age 27)	(Turkish Football Federation) Fenerbahçe
23	FW	Merveille Kanjinga	1 February 2003 (age 23)	(French Football Federation) PSG Féminines
25	FW	Flavine Mawete	22 June 1997 (age 29)	(Royal Spanish Football Federation) DUX Logroño
26	FW	Deborah Ngallua	25 May 2002 (age 24)	(French Football Federation) St George Vongienne

=== Recent call-ups ===
The following players have been called up to the DR Congo squad in the past 12 months.

Pos.	Player	Date of birth (age)	Caps	Goals	Club	Latest call-up
Notes: ^{RET} = Retired from the national team; ^{PRE} = Preliminary squad

== Records ==
*Active players in bold, statistics correct as of 2 August 2021.

=== Most capped players ===
#	Player	Year(s)	Caps

=== Top goalscorers ===
#	Player	Year(s)	Goals	Caps

== Competitive record ==
=== FIFA Women's World Cup ===
FIFA Women's World Cup record
Year	Result	GP	W	D*	L	GF	GA	GD
(China) 1991	Did not enter							
(Sweden) 1995	Did not enter							
(United States) 1999	Did not qualify							
(United States) 2003	Did not qualify							
(China) 2007	Did not qualify							
(Germany) 2011	Did not qualify							
(Canada) 2015	Did not enter							
(France) 2019	Did not enter							
(Australia) (New Zealand) 2023	Withdrew							
(Brazil) 2027	Did not qualify							
**Total**	0/10	-	-	-	-	-	-	-

=== Olympic Games ===
Summer Olympics record
Year	Result	GP	W	D*	L	GF	GA	GD
(United States) 1996	Did not enter							
(Australia) 2000	Did not qualify							
(Greece) 2004	Did not qualify							
(China) 2008	Did not qualify							
(United Kingdom) 2012	Did not qualify							
(Brazil) 2016	Did not enter							
(Japan) 2020	Did not qualify							
(France) 2024	Did not qualify							
**Total**	0/8	-	-	-	-	-	-	-

=== Women's Africa Cup of Nations ===
Women's Africa Cup of Nations record
Year	Round	M	W	D	L	GF	GA
1991	Did not enter						
1995	Did not enter						
(Nigeria) 1998	**Third place**	5	1	2	2	8	14
(South Africa) 2000	Did not enter						
(Nigeria) 2002	Did not qualify						
(South Africa) 2004	Did not enter						
(Nigeria) 2006	**Group stage**	3	0	1	2	4	7
(Equatorial Guinea) 2008	Did not qualify						
(South Africa) 2010	Did not qualify						
(Equatorial Guinea) 2012	**Group stage**	3	1	0	2	2	10
(Namibia) 2014	Did not enter						
(Cameroon) 2016	Withdrew						
(Ghana) 2018	Did not enter						
(Morocco) 2022	Withdrew						
(Morocco) 2024	**Group stage**	3	0	0	3	2	9
(Morocco) 2026	Did not qualify						
Total	4/14	14	2	3	9	16	40

*Draws include knockout matches decided on penalty kicks.

=== African Games ===
African Games record
Year	Round	M	W	D	L	GF	GA
(Nigeria) 2003	Group stage	3	1	1	1	5	6
(Algeria) 2007	Did not enter						
(Mozambique) 2011	Did not enter						
(Republic of the Congo) 2015	Did not enter						
(Morocco) 2019	See the U-20 team						
(Ghana) 2023	See the U-20 team						
(Egypt) 2027	To be determined						
Total	**1/5**	3	1	1	1	5	6

- 2019 and 2023 editions of the football tournament was played by the U-20 teams.

==== UNIFFAC Women's Cup ====
UNIFFAC Women's Cup
Year	Result	Matches	Wins	Draws	Losses	GF	GA	GD
(Equatorial Guinea) 2020	Runner-up	5	2	3	0	9	3	+6
Total	1/1	5	3	2	0	11	7	+4

== Honours ==
=== Major competitions ===
- **Women's Africa Cup of Nations**

Third place: (1) 1998

== See also ==
- Sport in the Democratic Republic of the Congo
  - Football in the Democratic Republic of the Congo
    - Women's football in the Democratic Republic of the Congo
