= 1991 African Women's Championship =

Inaugural edition of WAFCON

Tournament details
- Dates: 16 February – 30 June
- Teams: 8

Final positions
- Champions: Nigeria (1st title)
- Runners-up: Cameroon

Tournament statistics
- Matches played: 6
- Goals scored: 22 (3.67 per match)

The 1991 African Women's Championship was the inaugural edition of the currently-named Women's Africa Cup of Nations, invoked to determine CAF's single qualifier for the inaugural edition of the FIFA Women's World Cup that year. Nigeria defeated Cameroon in the final to win its first title and earn qualification.

Eight teams were originally scheduled to play in the tournament, but four of them withdrew, with Cameroon reaching the final on two walkovers.

== Participating teams ==
The eight participating teams were:

- Cameroon
- Congo
- Ghana
- Guinea
- Nigeria
- Senegal
- Zambia
- Zimbabwe

The teams who withdrew in italics.

== Bracket ==
Quarter-finals
Nigeria	5	2	7
Ghana	1	1	2
Guinea (w/o)
Senegal
Zambia (w/o)
Zimbabwe
Cameroon (w/o)
Congo

Semi-finals
Nigeria	3	4	7
Guinea	0	0	0
Zambia
Cameroon (w/o)

Final
Nigeria	2	4	6
Cameroon	0	0	0

== Final Tournament ==
=== First round ===
Team 1	Agg.	Team 2	1st leg	2nd leg
Nigeria	7–2	Ghana	5–1	2–1
Guinea	w/o	Senegal	—	—
Zambia	w/o	Zimbabwe	—	—
Cameroon	w/o	Congo	—	—

February 16, 1991

Nigeria	5–1	Ghana

National Stadium, Lagos
Attendance: 55,000
March 3, 1991

Ghana	1–2	Nigeria

Accra Sports Stadium, Accra

Nigeria won 7–2 on aggregate.

Guinea	w/o	Senegal

Senegal withdrew, Guinea advanced.

Zambia	w/o	Zimbabwe

Zimbabwe withdrew, Zambia advanced.

Cameroon	w/o	Congo

Congo withdrew, Cameroon advanced.

=== Semifinals ===
Team 1	Agg.	Team 2	1st leg	2nd leg
Nigeria	7–0	Guinea	3–0	4–0
Cameroon	w/o	Zambia	—	—

May 4, 1991

Nigeria	3–0	Guinea

National Stadium, Lagos
May 19, 1991

Guinea	0–4	Nigeria

Stade du 28 Septembre, Conakry

Nigeria won 7–0 on aggregate.

Cameroon	w/o	Zambia

Zambia withdrew, Cameroon advanced.

=== Final ===
June 15, 1991

Nigeria	2–0	Cameroon

National Stadium, Lagos
June 30, 1991

Cameroon	0–4	Nigeria

Stade Ahmadou Ahidjo, Yaoundé
Attendance: 30,000

Nigeria won 6–0 on aggregate and also qualified for the 1991 FIFA Women's World Cup.

== Awards ==
1991 African Women's Championship winners

Nigeria
First title

== Qualified team for FIFA Women's World Cup ==
Team	Qualified on	Previous appearances in FIFA Women's World Cup^{1}
Nigeria	30 June 1991	0 (Debut)
