= Congo women's national football team =

Women's national association football team representing Congo

Congo
- Nickname: Diablesses Rouges (The Red She-Devils)
- Association: Congolese Football Federation
- Confederation: CAF (Africa)
- Sub-confederation: UNIFFAC (Central Africa)
- Head coach: Gabriel Dengaki
- Home stadium: Stade de la Revolution
- FIFA code: CGO
First colours	Second colours

FIFA ranking
- Current: 112 ▼1 (20 October 2026)
- Highest: 79 (December 2009)
- Lowest: 122 (October 2007)

First international
- Equatorial Guinea 2–2 Congo (Malabo, Equatorial Guinea; 30 May 2004)

Biggest win
- Congo 9–0 Togo (Brazzaville, Republic of the Congo; 12 March 2006)

Biggest defeat
- Morocco 7–0 Congo (12 June 2022)

Africa Women Cup of Nations
- Appearances: 1 (first in 2008)
- Best result: Group stage, 2008

The Congo women's national football team (French: Équipe du Congo féminine de football) represents the Republic of the Congo in international women's football. The team is governed by the Congolese Football Federation (CFF) and competes as a member of CAF and FIFA.

On the international stage, the Congo women's national team have only participated once in the Women's Africa Cup of Nations, competing in the 2008 edition held in Equatorial Guinea, being eliminated in the group stage.

== History ==
=== The beginning ===
The Congo women's national team played its first official match on May 30, 2004, in Malabo against Equatorial Guinea (draw 2–2). The Congolese women have participated in one African Women's Football Championship finals in 2006, where they were eliminated in the first round. The team has never participated in a World Cup or Olympic finals.

== Team image ==
=== Home stadium ===
The Congo women's national football team plays their home matches at the Stade Alphonse Massemba-Débat.

== Results and fixtures ==
The following is a list of match results in the last 12 months, as well as any future matches that have been scheduled.

Win Draw Lose Fixture

=== 2026 ===
9 October 2026 2028 CAF Olympic Qualifying Tournament	Congo	Cancelled	Morocco	Brazzaville
15:00 UTC+1				Stadium: Alphonse Massemba-Débat Stadium

13 October 2026 2028 CAF Olympic Qualifying Tournament	Morocco	Cancelled	Congo	Morocco
20:00 UTC+1

4 November 2026 Friendly	Congo	4–1	São Tomé and Príncipe	Libreville, Gabon

7 November 2026 Friendly	Gabon	3–6	Congo	Libreville, Gabon

10 November 2026 Friendly	Congo	1–1	Central African Republic	Libreville, Gabon

Source: global archive

== Coaching staff ==
Position	Name	Ref.
Head coach	M.MBEMBA BERJONA	

== History of Managers ==
- (−2022) Gabriel Dengaki
- ( 2022–)M.MBEMBA BERJONA

== Players ==
=== Current squad ===
- The following players were named in November 2023 for the 2024 WAFCON qualification 2nd Round .
- Caps and goals accurate up to and including 30 October 2021.

No.	Pos.	Player	Date of birth (age)	Caps	Goals	Club
1	GK	Jessica Mpika				
16	GK	Valle Ngamakita	13 April 1991 (age 35)			
2	DF	Flore Mabahou	15 December 1992 (age 33)			
4	DF	Grâce Akouala				(Congolese Football Federation)
5	DF	Michelle Mfouo	18 September 1998 (age 28)			(Congolese Association Football Federation) TP Mazembe
8	DF	Sacré Taty				
13	DF	Alima Ndayaka				(Congolese Football Federation)
15	DF	Chimène Ngazue	4 April 2004 (age 22)			(Royal Moroccan Football Federation) Raja Aït Iazza
17	DF	Tansylvie Manangou	21 February 1990 (age 36)			
6	MF	Gabelle Ngouala	7 May 1996 (age 30)			(Congolese Football Federation)
9	MF	Dedina Mabondzo				(Congolese Football Federation)
12	MF	Clarisse Kouanga	1 January 2003 (age 23)			
	MF	Josiane Toubele	11 June 2002 (age 24)			(Congolese Football Federation) Epaghaba
2	FW	Merveille Sita Ndengo				
7	FW	Pauline Mbayo	22 April 2005 (age 21)			(Congolese Football Federation) AC Colombe
10	FW	Queen Bouanga				(Congolese Football Federation)
11	FW	Bénédicte Nzeyi				
14	FW	Doris Senga				
18	FW	Aïcha Yamoumou	25 August 2003 (age 23)			(Congolese Football Federation)

=== Recent call-ups ===
The following players have been called up to a Congo squad in the past 12 months.

Pos.	Player	Date of birth (age)	Caps	Goals	Club	Latest call-up

== Individual records ==
- Active players in **bold**, statistics correct **as of 2020**.

=== Most capped players ===
#	Player	Year(s)	Caps

=== Top goalscorers ===
#	Player	Year(s)	Goals	Caps

== Achievements ==
=== Women's World Cup record ===
FIFA Women's World Cup finals
Year	Result	GP	W	D*	L	GF	GA	GD
(China) 1991	Withdrew							
(Sweden) 1995	Did not enter							
(United States) 1999	Did not enter							
(United States) 2003	Did not enter							
(China) 2007	Withdrew							
(Germany) 2011	Did not enter							
(Canada) 2015	Did not enter							
(France) 2019	Did not qualify							
(Australia) (New Zealand) 2023	Did not qualify							
(Brazil) 2027	Withdrew							
Total	0/10	0	0	0	0	0	0	0

*Draws include knockout matches decided on penalty kicks.

=== Olympic Games ===
Summer Olympics record
Year	Result	Pld	W	D*	L	GS	GA	GD
(United States) 1996	Did not qualify							
(Australia) 2000	Did not qualify							
(Greece) 2004	Did not qualify							
(China) 2008	Did not qualify							
(United Kingdom) 2012	Did not qualify							
(Brazil) 2016	Did not qualify							
(Japan) 2020	Did not qualify							
(France) 2024	Did not qualify							
Total	0/8	0	0	0	0	0	0	0

*Draws include knockout matches decided on penalty kicks.

=== Women's Africa Cup of Nations ===
Women's Africa Cup of Nations
Year	Result	Pld	W	D	L	GF	GA
1991	Withdrew in the quarterfinals						
1995-2002	Did not enter						
(South Africa) 2004	Did not qualify						
(Nigeria) 2006	Withdrew in the qualifiers						
(Equatorial Guinea) 2008	Group stage	3	1	0	2	3	6
(South Africa) 2010	Did not enter						
(Equatorial Guinea) 2012	Did not enter						
(Namibia) 2014	Did not enter						
(Cameroon) 2016	Did not enter						
(Ghana) 2018	Did not qualify						
(Morocco) 2022	Did not qualify						
(Morocco) 2024	Did not qualify						
(Morocco) 2026	Withdrew						
Total	1/16	3	1	0	2	3	6

=== African Games ===
African Games Finals
Year	Round	Result	M	W	D	L	GF	GA
(Republic of the Congo) 2015	**Group stage**		3	0	1	2	2	7
(Ghana) 2023	-		0	0	0	0	0	0
Total	1/5		3	0	1	2	2	7

=== UNIFFAC Women's Cup ===
UNIFFAC Women's Cup
Year	Result	Matches	Wins	Draws	Losses	GF	GA	GD
(Equatorial Guinea) 2020	Did not enter							
Total	1/1	4	0	3	1	4	5	−1

== See also ==
- Congo national football team, the men's team
