= Equatoguinean Football Federation =

Governing body of association football in Equatorial Guinea

CAF
- Founded: 1975
- Headquarters: Malabo
- FIFA affiliation: 1986
- CAF affiliation: 1986
- UNIFFAC affiliation: 1978
- President: Venancio Tomás Ndong
- Website: feguifut.org

The Equatoguinean Football Federation (Spanish: Federación Ecuatoguineana de Fútbol; FEGUIFUT) is the governing body of football in Equatorial Guinea. It was founded in 1975, and became affiliated with FIFA and CAF in 1986. The federation organizes the national football league and the national team, as well as the women's national team and the national futsal team.
