= Estadio de Mongomo =

Building in Equatorial Guinea

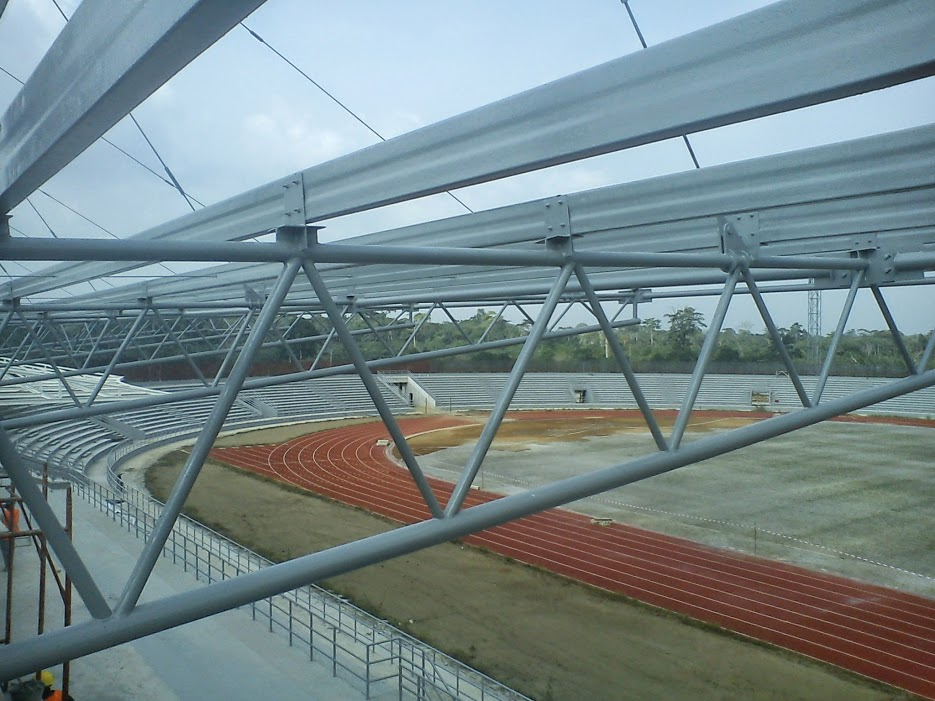
- Interactive map of Estadio de Mongomo
- Full name: Estadio Santiago Nguema Eneme
- Location: Mongomo
- Coordinates: 1°39′4″N 11°17′57.5″E
- Capacity: 10,000

The Estadio de Mongomo is a multi-sports stadium in Mongomo, Equatorial Guinea, one of the host venues for the 2015 Africa Cup of Nations.
