= Equatorial Guinea women's national football team =

Equatorial Guinea
- Nickname: Nzalang Femenino
- Association: Equatoguinean Football Federation
- Confederation: CAF (Africa)
- Sub-confederation: UNIFFAC (Central Africa)
- Head coach: Guillermo Ganet
- Captain: Dorine Chuigoué
- Most caps: Genoveva Añonman (32)
- Top scorer: Genoveva Añonman (24)
- FIFA code: EQG
First colours	Second colours

FIFA ranking
- Current: 90 (16 June 2026)
- Highest: 50 (September 2015, December 2016 – March 2017)
- Lowest: 119 (March 2006)

First international
- Equatorial Guinea 0–3 Gabon (Equatorial Guinea; 10 June 2000)

Biggest win
- Luxembourg 0–8 Equatorial Guinea (Hostert, Luxembourg; 18 June 2011)

Biggest defeat
- Nigeria 9–0 Equatorial Guinea (Ilıca, Turkey; 23 February 2021)

World Cup
- Appearances: 1 (first in 2011)
- Best result: Group Stage (2011)

Africa Women Cup of Nations
- Appearances: 4 (first in 2006)
- Best result: Winners (2008 & 2012)

The Equatorial Guinea women's national football team, nicknamed the Nzalang Femenino, has represented Equatorial Guinea in senior international women's football competition since 2000. It is controlled by the Equatoguinean Football Federation, the governing body for football in Equatorial Guinea.

In the 2008 Women's African Football Championship they defeated the seven-time champions Nigeria 1–0 in the semifinal and went on to win the championship beating South Africa 2–1. They became the first nation other than Nigeria to win the Women's African Football Championship.

Equatorial Guinea played at the 2011 FIFA Women's World Cup.

The team won the 2012 African Women's Championship, winning 4–0 in the final against South Africa.

Equatorial Guinea is the third women's team (out of eight) from the Confederation of African Football to qualify for a FIFA Women's World Cup (Nigeria, Ghana, Cameroon, Côte d'Ivoire, South Africa, Morocco and Zambia being the others).

== History ==
Equatorial Guinea defeated South Africa 2–1 in an Olympic Games Qualifier on 18 February 2007, but lost the return leg 4–2. In the 2008 Women's African Football Championship (which they hosted), they went undefeated in Group A which featured Cameroon, Congo, and Mali. They defeated Nigeria 1–0 in the semifinal and went on to win the championship beating South Africa 2–1. They became the first (and, so far, only) nation other than Nigeria to win the Women's African Football Championship. They made their debut in an international tournament at the 2011 FIFA Women's World Cup, losing all three of their group stage matches against Norway, Australia and Brazil.

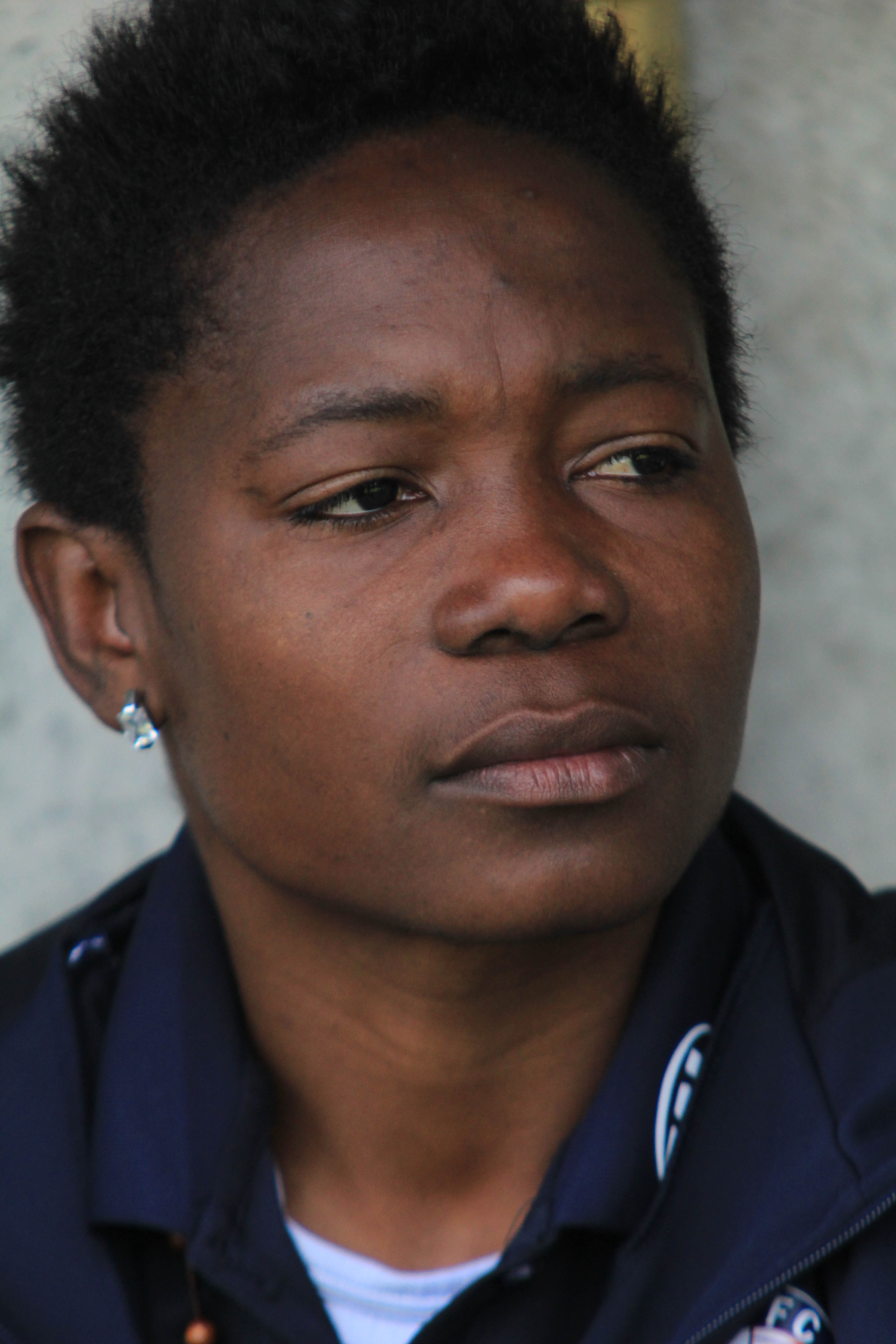
Genoveva Añonman played numerous games for Equatorial Guinea

In 2012, Equatorial Guinea hosted and won the 2012 African Women's Championship. They won the semi-final 2–0 versus Cameroon, and the final 4–0 against South Africa, with two goals by Gloria Chinasa and one each by Tiga (Adriana Aparecida Costa) and the captain Genoveva Añonman.

Between 2006 and 2010, Bilguissa and Salimata Simporé, a sibling duo from Burkina Faso, used to play for Equatorial Guinea – the first as a central defender and the latter as a centre forward. Beyond the mechanism by which they were naturalized (similar to the Brazilians), the main controversy about the Simporés arose regarding whether they were actually two men. Around April 2011, they were removed from national team by the Italian-born Brazilian coach Marcelo Frigerio, who had recently assumed, just a few months before participating in the World Cup. Since then, the Simporé siblings never were called-up. In 2015, Frigerio, now a former national team coach, told the Brazilian press they are men.

== Eligibility of players controversy ==
The women's national football team has been implicated in a controversy surrounding the naturalization of foreign-born players, a controversy which has also surrounded the men's team since the late 2000s. For example, both FIFA and CAF found the federation liable for providing fake passports of players who were actually born in Brazil. Their issues go back to 2011, when Equatorial Guinea fielded an ineligible player, Jade Boho without completing her one-time switch (from Spain), Equatorial Guinea was disqualified from the Women's Football tournament at the 2012 Olympic Games.

Since then, they fielded Camila Maria do Carmo Nobre de Oliveira, who was ruled ineligible to play for Equatorial Guinea because she was using two passports with unreliably different information during the qualifying competition for the 2016 Olympics. Specifically, she also has two birth certificates that show different information about her parents' nationality. A further investigation found that they have fielded 12 ineligible players, two of them with forged passports, and consequently, they were banned from the next three women's AFCONs, the 2020 Olympics, and the 2019 Women's World Cup. Subsequently, the federation appealed to CAS, and both CAS and CAF overturned the ban during their emergency meeting for the 2018 Women's AFCON tournament. Initially, Kenya replaced Equatorial Guinea after they were disqualified by the CAF for fielding an ineligible player, but the decision was overturned on appeal, and Equatorial Guinea were reintegrated into the competition. Kenya appealed to the Court of Arbitration for Sport, but failed to overturn the decision.

== Team image ==
=== Nicknames ===
The Equatorial Guinea women's national football team has been known or nicknamed as the "Nzalang Femenino".

== Results and fixtures ==
The following is a list of match results in the last 12 months, as well as any future matches that have been scheduled.

Legend

Win Draw Lose Fixture

=== 2026 ===
4 June Hybrid friendly	UD Almería (Spain)	0–1	Equatorial Guinea	Malaga, Spain
			Mendoua

8 June Friendly	Equatorial Guinea	1–3	Haiti	Malaga, Spain
18:00 UTC+1	Nñegue 85'		Dumornay 19', 55'; Étienne 30'

== Coaching staff ==
=== Current coaching staff ===
Position	Name	Ref.
Head coach	Guillermo Ganet	

=== Manager history ===
As of 26 February 2025, after the match against Tanzania.

Name	Period	Matches	Wins	Draws	Losses	Winning %	Notes
(Republic of the Congo) Jean-Paul Mpila	2018–2022	0	0	0	0	00.0%	
José David Ekang	2023	4	0	2	2	00.0%	
Guillermo Ganet	2025	2	0	1	1	00.0%	

== Players ==
=== Current squad ===
The following players were called up for the matches against Burkina Faso on 8 and 13 October 2026.

Caps and goals as of 8 October 2026, after the match against Burkina Faso.

No.	Pos.	Player	Date of birth (age)	Caps	Goals	Club
1	GK	Antonina Ayingono	3 March 2003 (age 23)	1	0	(Equatoguinean Football Federation) Estrella Roja
13	GK	Rita Afang	3 December 2006 (age 19)	0	0	(Equatoguinean Football Federation) 15 de Agosto
3	DF	Celia Ebesi		1	0	(Equatoguinean Football Federation) Ebenezer
4	DF	Raquel Etopa (captain)	5 June 2004 (age 22)	7	0	(Egyptian Football Association) FC Masar
5	DF	Reina Mansogo	4 August 2000 (age 26)	5	0	(French Football Federation) ES Molsheim Ernolsheim
20	DF	Agapita Avosogo	5 May 2000 (age 26)	8	0	(Equatoguinean Football Federation) Ebenezer
21	DF	Avelina Abang	8 December 2003 (age 22)	15	0	(Equatoguinean Football Federation) 15 de Agosto
	DF	Montserrath Bokirio	19 September 2005 (age 21)	0	0	(Equatoguinean Football Federation) Reinas de Bioko
	DF	Concha Obono		0	0	(Equatoguinean Football Federation) Abuela Mercedes
6	MF	Reina Nñegue		1	1	(Equatoguinean Football Federation) Atlético Malabo
8	MF	Lynda Mendoua	26 June 1994 (age 32)	6+	1+	(Royal Moroccan Football Federation) SC Casablanca
11	MF	Shalma Midje	17 November 2007 (age 18)	4	1	(Royal Spanish Football Federation) Fundación CD Tenerife B
12	MF	Celestina Manga	12 September 2002 (age 24)	12	0	(Burkinabé Football Federation) USFA
14	MF	Ramona Mibuy	28 June 2002 (age 24)	4	0	(Equatoguinean Football Federation) Reinas de Bioko
16	MF	Catalina Andeme	14 July 1999 (age 27)	12	0	(Equatoguinean Football Federation) Super Leonas
	MF	Hipólita Ebang		0	0	(Equatoguinean Football Federation) Supremas
	MF	Rosita Mofuman		0	0	(Equatoguinean Football Federation) Supremas
7	FW	Elena Obono	13 November 1999 (age 26)	12	6	(Equatoguinean Football Federation) 15 de Agosto
9	FW	Diana Meriva	3 March 2002 (age 24)	3	0	(Portuguese Football Federation) Gil Vicente
10	MF	Mari Cruz Ebula	30 July 2005 (age 21)	5	0	(Royal Moroccan Football Federation) FUS Rabat
15	FW	Ana María Nchama	17 May 1999 (age 27)	8	0	(Equatoguinean Football Federation) Estrella Roja
	FW	Anastasia Asogo		0	0	(Equatoguinean Football Federation) Super Leonas

=== Recent call-ups ===
The following players have been called up to an Equatorial Guinea squad in the past 12 months.

Pos.	Player	Date of birth (age)	Caps	Goals	Club	Latest call-up
GK	Dolores Hernández	24 October 2001 (age 24)	13	0	(Turkey) Adana İdman Yurdu	v. Burkina Faso, 8 October 2026 ^{WD}
DF	Lola Okenve ^{RET}	12 March 1997 (age 29)	3	0	Retired	v. Haiti, 8 June 2026
DF	Genoveva Abegue	30 June 2006 (age 20)	1	0	(Equatorial Guinea) Estrella Roja	v. Haiti, 8 June 2026
DF	Carmela Bikie Boko	15 July 2002 (age 24)	1	0	(Spain) UCAM Murcia	v. Haiti, 8 June 2026
DF	Constantina Efua		1	0	(Equatorial Guinea) Estrella Roja	v. Haiti, 8 June 2026
DF	Seyla Lopelo	11 December 2000 (age 25)	1	0	Unattached	v. Haiti, 8 June 2026
DF	Ivana Asue		0	0	(Equatorial Guinea) Ebenezer	v. Haiti, 8 June 2026
DF	Paula Dik	2007 (age 18–19)	0	0	(Spain) Ciudad de Salamanca	v. Haiti, 8 June 2026
MF	Luz Milagrosa Obono	7 April 1996 (age 30)	6+	0	(Spain) Valdefierro	v. Haiti, 8 June 2026
MF	Carmen Pilar Amado	14 June 2007 (age 19)	0	0	(Spain) Ciutat de Mislata	v. Haiti, 8 June 2026
MF	María Delicia Obono	24 March 2003 (age 23)	0	0	(Equatorial Guinea) 15 de Agosto	v. Haiti, 8 June 2026
FW	Claudia Teresa Mayé	7 January 2006 (age 20)	8	0	(Spain) Intxaurdi	v. Haiti, 8 June 2026
FW	Marta Borico	15 June 2000 (age 26)	1	0	(England) Hayes & Yeading	v. Haiti, 8 June 2026
FW	Cristina Hernández	12 July 2001 (age 25)	1	0	(Spain) Huesca	v. Haiti, 8 June 2026
^{INJ} Player withdrew from the squad due to an injury^{PRE} Preliminary squad / standby^{WD} Player withdrew from the squad due to non-injury issue^{RET} Player retired from the national team^{SUS} Player is serving suspension

== Records ==
Players in bold are still active, at least at club level.

As of 25 January 2021

=== Most capped players ===
#	Name	Caps	Goals	Career
1	Genoveva Añonman	32	24	2002–2018

=== Top goalscorers ===
#	Name	Goals	Caps	Ratio	Career
1	Genoveva Añonman	24	32	0.75	2002–2018

== Competitive record ==
=== Worldwide ===
==== FIFA Women's World Cup ====
FIFA Women's World Cup finals record
Year	Result	GP	W	D*	L	GF	GA	GD
(China) 1991	Did not enter							
(Sweden) 1995	Did not enter							
(United States) 1999	Did not enter							
(United States) 2003	Did not qualify							
(China) 2007	Did not qualify							
(Germany) 2011	Group Stage	3	0	0	3	2	7	−5
(Canada) 2015	Did not qualify							
(France) 2019	Banned							
(Australia) (New Zealand) 2023	Did not qualify							
(Brazil) 2027	Did not qualify							
(Mexico) (United States) 2031	To be determined							
(United Kingdom) 2035	To be determined							
Total	1/12	3	0	0	3	2	7	−5

*Draws include knockout matches decided on penalty kicks.

FIFA Women's World Cup finals history
Year	Round	Date	Opponent	Result	Stadium
(Germany) 2011	Group stage	29 June	Norway	**L** 0–1	Impuls Arena, Augsburg
(Germany) 2011	Group stage	3 July	Australia	**L** 2–3	Ruhrstadion, Bochum
(Germany) 2011	Group stage	6 July	Brazil	**L** 0–3	Commerzbank-Arena, Frankfurt

==== Olympic Games ====
Summer Olympics record
Year	Result	Matches	Wins	Draws	Losses	GF	GA
(United States) 1996	Did Not Enter						
(Australia) 2000	Did Not Enter						
(Greece) 2004	Did not qualify						
(China) 2008	Did not qualify						
(United Kingdom) 2012	Disqualified						
(Brazil) 2016	Did not qualify						
(Japan) 2020	Banned						
(France) 2024	Did not qualify						
(United States) 2028	To be determined						
Total	0/9	0	0	0	0	0	0

==== Africa Women Cup of Nations ====
Africa Women Cup of Nations record
Year	Result	Matches	Wins	Draws	Losses	GF	GA
1991	Did Not Enter						
1995	Did Not Enter						
(Nigeria) 1998	Did Not Enter						
(South Africa) 2000	Did not qualify						
(Nigeria) 2002	Did not qualify						
(South Africa) 2004	Did not qualify						
(Nigeria) 2006	Group Stage	3	0	1	2	5	9
(Equatorial Guinea) 2008	**Champions**	5	5	0	0	11	4
(South Africa) 2010	Runners-Up	5	3	1	1	11	8
(Equatorial Guinea) 2012	**Champions**	5	5	0	0	18	0
(Namibia) 2014	Did not qualify						
(Cameroon) 2016	Disqualified						
(Ghana) 2018	Group Stage	3	0	0	3	1	18
(Republic of the Congo) 2020	Banned, later cancelled						
(Morocco) 2022	Did not qualify						
(Morocco) 2024	Did not qualify (Note: Challenged by the Equatoguinean Football Federation, which claims DR Congo have fielded two players (Fideline Ngoy and Falonne Pambani) who had appeared at the 2012 African Women's Championship using other dates of birth.)						
(Morocco) 2026	Did not qualify						
Total	2 Titles	21	13	2	6	46	39

==== African Games ====
African Games record
Year	Result	Matches	Wins	Draws	Losses	GF	GA
(Nigeria) 2003	Did Not Enter						
(Algeria) 2007	Did Not Enter						
(Mozambique) 2011	Did not qualify						
(Republic of the Congo) 2015	Did Not Enter						
(Morocco) 2019	See Equatorial Guinea women's national under-20 football team						
(Ghana) 2023	See Equatorial Guinea women's national under-20 football team						
Total	0/4	0	0	0	0	0	0

=== Regional ===
==== UNIFFAC Women's Cup ====
UNIFFAC Women's Cup
Year	Result	Matches	Wins	Draws	Losses	GF	GA	GD
(Equatorial Guinea) 2020	winner	5	3	2	0	8	4	+4
Total	1/1	5	3	2	0	12	6	+6

==== Turkish Women's Cup ====
(Turkey) Turkish Women's Cup record
Year	Result	GP	W	D	L	GF	GA	GD
2021	4th Place	3	0	0	3	0	16	−16
Total	1/5	3	0	0	3	0	16	−16

== Honours ==
=== Major competitions ===
Africa Women Cup of Nations

- **Champions** (2): (gold) 2008, 2012
- Runners-up (1): (silver) 2010

=== Regional ===
UNIFFAC Women's Cup

- **Champions** (1): (gold) 2020

== All−time record against FIFA recognized nations ==
The list shown below shows the Equatorial Guinea women's national football team all−time international record against opposing nations.
*As of xxxxxx after match against xxxx.

Key

Positive balance (more wins than losses)
Neutral balance (as many wins as losses)
Negative balance (more losses than wins)

Against	Pld	W	D	L	GF	GA	GD	Confederation

=== Record per opponent ===
*As ofxxxxx after match against xxxxx.

Key

Positive balance (more wins than losses)
Neutral balance (as many wins as losses)
Negative balance (more losses than wins)

The following table shows Equatorial Guinea's all-time official international record per opponent:

Opponent	Pld	W	D	L	GF	GA	GD	W%	Confederation
Total									—

== See also ==
- Equatorial Guinea national football team

== Notes ==
Sporting positions
Preceded by 2006 Nigeria	African Women's Champions; 2008 (First title)	Succeeded by 2010 Nigeria
Preceded by 2010 Nigeria	African Women's Champions; 2012 (Second title)	Succeeded by 2014 Nigeria
