= Mongomo =

Mongomo Mongomo de Guadalupe
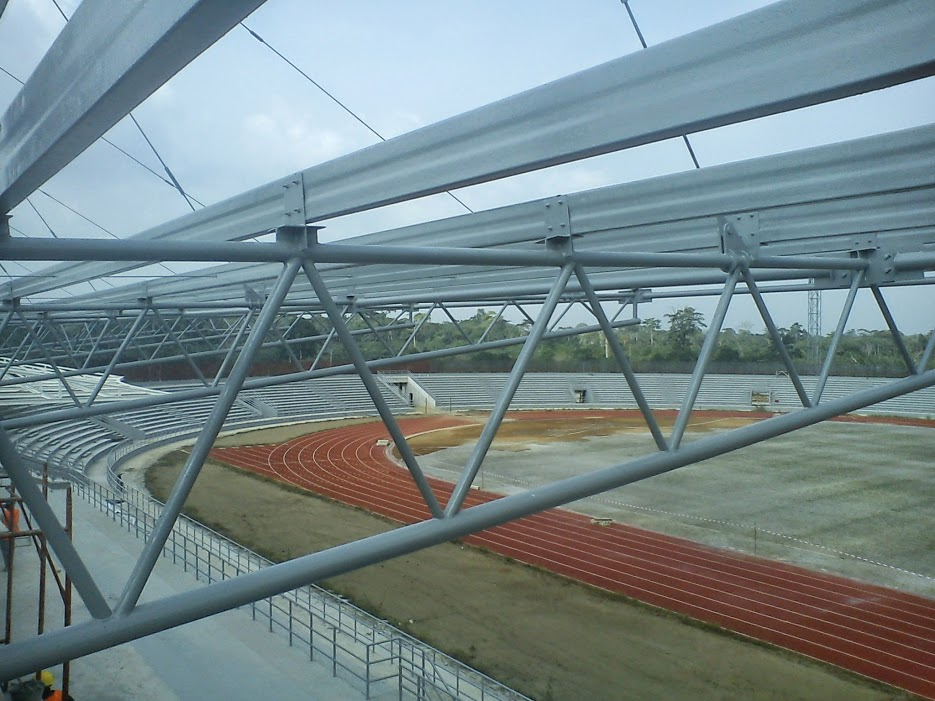
- Mongomo Stadium

- Location in Equatorial Guinea
- Coordinates: 1°38′43.34″N 11°19′00.60″E
- Country: Equatorial Guinea
- Province: Wele-Nzas

Population (2012)
  - City: 7,251
  - Metro: 53,500
- Climate: Aw

Mongomo is a town in the province of Wele-Nzas on mainland Equatorial Guinea, on the eastern border, roughly 1 km (0.62 mi) west of Gabon's Woleu-Ntem Province.

The president of Equatorial Guinea, Teodoro Obiang Nguema Mbasogo, was born in Mongomo.

== Religion ==
The Basilica of the Immaculate Conception in Mongomo is the largest religious building in Central Africa and the second largest Roman Catholic church throughout Africa, after the Basilica of Our Lady of Peace in Yamoussoukro, Ivory Coast. It is the episcopal see of the Roman Catholic Diocese of Mongomo.

== Sports ==
Mongomo's football club is Deportivo Mongomo, active in the Equatoguinean Premier League. Mongomo was named a host city of the 2015 African Cup of Nations.

== Other ==
The Mongomo Hotel is located in Kos Ete, Mongomo.
