= Ebibeyin Stadium =

- Interactive map of Ebibeyin Stadium
- Location: Ebibeyin
- Coordinates: 2°8′28″N 11°18′43.5″E
- Capacity: 8,000

Construction
- Renovated: 2014

Tenant
- Equatorial Guinea national football team

The Ebibeyin Stadium is the home stadium of Akonangui FC in Ebibeyin, Equatorial Guinea.

0n 11 October 2014, the stadium hosted the Copa de la Primera Dama final.

On 14 November 2014, it was announced as one of the host venues of the 2015 Africa Cup of Nations.
