= 2006 FIFA U-20 Women's World Championship squads =

Football tournament squads

This article lists the team squads of the 2006 FIFA U-20 Women's World Championship, held in Russia from 17 August to 3 September 2006.

== Group A ==
=== Australia ===
Coach: Alistair Edwards

No.	Pos.	Player	Date of birth (age)	Caps	Goals	Club
1	GK	Lydia Williams	13 May 1988 (aged 18)	7	0	(Football Australia) Canberra Eclipse FC
2	DF	Clare Polkinghorne	1 February 1989 (aged 17)	8	0	(Football Australia) Queensland Sting FC
3	DF	Danielle Brogan	28 June 1988 (aged 18)	7	0	(Football Australia) NSW Sapphires
4	DF	Kim Carroll	2 September 1987 (aged 18)	11	1	(Football Australia) Queensland Sting FC
5	MF	Olivia Kennedy	30 January 1988 (aged 18)	8	0	(Football Australia) NSW Sapphires
6	MF	Sally Shipard (captain)	20 October 1987 (aged 18)	12	1	(Football Australia) NSW Sapphires
7	FW	Jenna Tristram	28 October 1986 (aged 19)	9	7	(Football Australia) Northern NSW Pride
8	MF	Servet Uzunlar	8 March 1989 (aged 17)	6	4	(Football Australia) NSW Sapphires
9	FW	Sasha McDonnell	1 December 1987 (aged 18)	8	7	(Football Australia) Queensland Sting FC
10	MF	Kylie Ledbrook	20 March 1986 (aged 20)	11	9	(Football Australia) NSW Sapphires
11	MF	Leah Blayney	4 July 1986 (aged 20)	8	1	(United States Soccer Federation) Auburn Tigers
12	MF	Amy Chapman	12 February 1987 (aged 19)	0	0	(Football Australia) Canberra Eclipse FC
13	MF	Caitlin Cooper	12 February 1988 (aged 18)	11	3	(Football Australia) NSW Sapphires
14	MF	Collette McCallum	26 March 1986 (aged 20)	11	7	(Football Australia) Western Waves FC
15	MF	Amy Jackson	8 September 1987 (aged 18)	6	3	(Football Australia) Victoria Vision
16	DF	Grace Gill	27 June 1989 (aged 17)	4	0	(Football Australia) Canberra Eclipse FC
17	MF	Renee Cartwright	3 February 1986 (aged 20)	5	1	(Football Australia) NSW Sapphires
18	GK	Alison Logue	3 June 1987 (aged 19)	5	0	
19	FW	Leena Khamis	19 June 1986 (aged 20)	10	4	(Football Australia) NSW Sapphires
20	DF	Nicole Somi	19 June 1986 (aged 20)	4	0	(Football Australia) Canberra Eclipse FC
21	GK	Kate Stewart	19 January 1987 (aged 19)	1	0	(Football Australia) Bundaberg Knights

=== Brazil ===
Coach: Jorge Barcellos

No.	Pos.	Player	Date of birth (age)	Caps	Goals	Club
1	GK	Bárbara	4 July 1988 (aged 18)			(Brazilian Football Confederation) Recife
2	DF	Daiane	22 July 1986 (aged 20)			(Brazilian Football Confederation) São Paulo
3	DF	Mônica	21 April 1987 (aged 19)			(Brazilian Football Confederation) Marilia
4	DF	Aliane	30 December 1986 (aged 19)			(Brazilian Football Confederation) Saltos
5	MF	Érika	4 February 1988 (aged 18)			(Brazilian Football Confederation) Santos
6	DF	Danielle	21 January 1987 (aged 19)			(Brazilian Football Confederation) Juventus
7	MF	Francielle	18 October 1989 (aged 16)			(Brazilian Football Confederation) Santos
8	MF	Renata Costa (captain)	8 July 1986 (aged 20)			(Brazilian Football Confederation) Botucatu
9	FW	Fabiana	4 August 1989 (aged 17)			(Brazilian Football Confederation) America
11	FW	Maurine	14 January 1986 (aged 20)			(Brazilian Football Confederation) CEPE-Caxias
12	GK	Thais	19 June 1987 (aged 19)			(Brazilian Football Confederation) São Caetano
13	DF	Luana Miessa	21 February 1988 (aged 18)			(Brazilian Football Confederation) Pedra Azul
14	DF	Fernanda	21 November 1987 (aged 18)			(Brazilian Football Confederation) Santos
15	DF	Adriane	20 September 1988 (aged 17)			(Brazilian Football Confederation) Saltos
16	FW	Elis	7 July 1987 (aged 19)			(Brazilian Football Confederation) Araraquara
17	FW	Pamela	3 September 1989 (aged 16)			(Brazilian Football Confederation) Campo Grande
18	MF	Jocielma	31 May 1988 (aged 18)			(Brazilian Football Confederation) Santos
19	FW	Luana Gomes	13 April 1986 (aged 20)			(Brazilian Football Confederation) Saltos
20	MF	Stephane	4 April 1988 (aged 18)			(Brazilian Football Confederation) Saltos
21	GK	Luciana	24 July 1987 (aged 19)			(Brazilian Football Confederation) Atlético Mineiro
23	MF	Tatiane	14 August 1988 (aged 18)			(Brazilian Football Confederation) Corinthians

=== New Zealand ===
Coach: (England) John Herdman

No.	Pos.	Player	Date of birth (age)	Caps	Goals	Club
1	GK	Aroon Clansey	12 February 1987 (aged 19)			(New Zealand Football) Three Kings United
2	DF	Ria Percival	7 December 1989 (aged 16)			(New Zealand Football) Lynn Avon United
3	DF	Emma Harrison	29 November 1987 (aged 18)			(New Zealand Football) Three Kings United
4	MF	Katie Hoyle	1 February 1988 (aged 18)			(New Zealand Football) Lynn Avon United
5	DF	Hannah Rishworth	11 January 1987 (aged 19)			(New Zealand Football) Three Kings United
6	DF	Hannah Bromley	15 November 1986 (aged 19)			(United States Soccer Federation) Tennessee Tech Golden Eagles
7	FW	Merissa Smith	11 November 1990 (aged 15)			(New Zealand Football) Three Kings United
8	FW	Alexandra Riley	30 October 1987 (aged 18)			(United States Soccer Federation) SoCal United
9	FW	Sarah Gregorius	6 August 1987 (aged 19)			(New Zealand Football) Lynn Avon United
10	MF	Emma Humphries	14 June 1986 (aged 20)			(United States Soccer Federation) Coastal Carolina Chanticleers
11	MF	Kirsty Yallop (captain)	4 November 1986 (aged 19)			(New Zealand Football) Lynn Avon United
12	FW	Renee Leota	16 May 1990 (aged 16)			(New Zealand Football) Miramar
13	FW	Emma Kete	1 September 1987 (aged 18)			(New Zealand Football) Three Kings United
14	DF	Abby Erceg	20 November 1989 (aged 16)			(New Zealand Football) Three Kings United
15	DF	Julia Baldwin	10 July 1987 (aged 19)			(New Zealand Football) Seatoun
16	DF	Petria Rennie	17 June 1987 (aged 19)			(New Zealand Football) Three Kings United
17	MF	Maggie Lankshear	11 November 1987 (aged 18)			(New Zealand Football) Three Kings United
18	GK	Caitlin Campbell	2 February 1991 (aged 15)			(New Zealand Football) Glenfield
19	FW	Helen Collins	30 October 1988 (aged 17)			(New Zealand Football) Western Springs
20	MF	Annalie Longo	1 July 1991 (aged 15)			(New Zealand Football) Three Kings United
21	GK	Bianca Mori	5 March 1989 (aged 17)			(New Zealand Football) Western Springs

=== Russia ===
Coach: Valentin Girshin

No.	Pos.	Player	Date of birth (age)	Caps	Goals	Club
1	GK	Elvira Todua	31 January 1986 (aged 20)			(Russian Football Union) Ryazan
2	DF	Maria Filisova	8 March 1988 (aged 18)			(Russian Football Union) Aurora St. Petersburg
3	DF	Anna Kozhnikova	10 July 1987 (aged 19)			(Russian Football Union) Rossiyanka Moscow
4	DF	Alexandra Gomozova	8 August 1986 (aged 20)			(Russian Football Union) Spartak Moscow
5	DF	Anna Gromolyuk	10 March 1986 (aged 20)			(Russian Football Union) Univ. Vitebsk
6	MF	Nadezda Kharchenko	27 March 1987 (aged 19)			(Russian Football Union) Prialit Reutov
7	MF	Elena Terekhova	5 July 1987 (aged 19)			(Russian Football Union) Spartak Moscow
8	MF	Oxana Titova	17 July 1986 (aged 20)			(Russian Football Union) Nadezhda Noginsk
9	FW	Elena Danilova	17 June 1987 (aged 19)			(Russian Football Union) Spartak Moscow
10	MF	Olga Petrova	9 July 1986 (aged 20)			(Russian Football Union) Rossiyanka Moscow
11	MF	Elena Morozova	15 March 1987 (aged 19)			(Russian Football Union) Rossiyanka Moscow
12	GK	Kristina Slashchinina	5 October 1989 (aged 16)			(Russian Football Union) Prialit Reutov
13	DF	Ksenia Tsybutovich (captain)	26 June 1987 (aged 19)			(Russian Football Union) Rossiyanka Moscow
14	DF	Olesya Mashina	8 October 1987 (aged 18)			(Russian Football Union) Prialit Reutov
15	MF	Svetlana Akimova	8 August 1988 (aged 18)			(Russian Football Union) Aurora St. Petersburg
16	DF	Tamara Starovoytova	18 January 1989 (aged 17)			(Russian Football Union) Energiya Voronezh
17	MF	Elena Shchegaleva	2 June 1987 (aged 19)			(Russian Football Union) Iskra St. Petersburg
18	MF	Tatiana Deripasko	19 November 1988 (aged 17)			(Russian Football Union) Aurora St. Petersburg
19	MF	Kristina Anokhina	27 September 1987 (aged 18)			(Russian Football Union) Rossiyanka Moscow
20	FW	Anastasia Smirnova	23 June 1990 (aged 16)			(Russian Football Union) Chertanovo Moscow
21	GK	Elena Kochneva	27 August 1989 (aged 16)			(Russian Football Union) Chertanovo Moscow

== Group B ==
=== Canada ===
Coach: Ian Bridge

No.	Pos.	Player	Date of birth (age)	Caps	Goals	Club
1	GK	Stephanie Labbé	10 October 1986 (aged 19)			(United States Soccer Federation) Connecticut Huskies
2	DF	Katie Radchuck	27 February 1986 (aged 20)			(United States Soccer Federation) Connecticut Huskies
3	DF	Sophie Schmidt (captain)	28 June 1988 (aged 18)			(Canadian Soccer Association) Vancouver Whitecaps
4	DF	Caroline Vanderpool	15 July 1986 (aged 20)			(United States Soccer Federation) LSU Tigers
5	DF	Emily Zurrer	12 July 1987 (aged 19)			(Canadian Soccer Association) Vancouver Whitecaps
6	MF	Kaylyn Kyle	6 October 1988 (aged 17)			(Canadian Soccer Association) Vancouver Whitecaps
7	FW	Jodi-Ann Robinson	17 April 1989 (aged 17)			(Canadian Soccer Association) Vancouver Whitecaps
8	MF	Paige Adams	6 February 1990 (aged 16)			(Canadian Soccer Association) Vancouver Whitecaps
9	FW	Selenia Iachelli	5 June 1986 (aged 20)			(United States Soccer Federation) Nebraska Cornhuskers
10	MF	Amanda Cicchini	28 February 1987 (aged 19)			(United States Soccer Federation) West Virginia Mountaineers
11	DF	Desiree Scott	31 July 1987 (aged 19)			(Canadian Soccer Association) Manitoba Bisons
12	DF	Sari Raber	1 January 1986 (aged 20)			(United States Soccer Federation) Nebraska Cornhuskers
13	MF	Loredana Riverso	21 February 1988 (aged 18)			(United States Soccer Federation) Purdue Boilermakers
14	FW	Aysha Jamani	28 June 1987 (aged 19)			(United States Soccer Federation) Nebraska Cornhuskers
15	FW	Lisa Collison	2 September 1986 (aged 19)			(United States Soccer Federation) Ohio State Buckeyes
16	FW	Taryne Boudreau	21 September 1989 (aged 16)			(Canadian Soccer Association) Vancouver Whitecaps
17	FW	Rheanne Sleiman	26 September 1989 (aged 16)			(Canadian Soccer Association) Vancouver Whitecaps
18	DF	Eden Hingwing	11 June 1988 (aged 18)			(Canadian Soccer Association) Vancouver Whitecaps
19	DF	Vonya Beckles	10 April 1989 (aged 17)			(Canadian Soccer Association) Toronto Lady Lynx
20	GK	Erin McNulty	3 June 1989 (aged 17)			(Canadian Soccer Association) Ottawa Fury
21	GK	Jaclyn Dunnett	25 September 1987 (aged 18)			(Canadian Soccer Association) Vancouver Whitecaps

=== China PR ===
Coach: Shang Ruihua

No.	Pos.	Player	Date of birth (age)	Caps	Goals	Club
1	GK	Zhang Yanru (captain)	10 January 1987 (aged 19)			(Chinese Football Association) Jiangsu Shuntian
2	DF	Zhou Gaoping	20 October 1986 (aged 19)			(Chinese Football Association) Jiangsu Shuntian
3	DF	Yuan Fan	6 November 1986 (aged 19)			(Chinese Football Association) Shanghai Shenhua
4	DF	Zhang Wei	9 June 1987 (aged 19)			(Chinese Football Association) Jiangsu Shuntian
5	DF	Weng Xinzhi	15 June 1988 (aged 18)			(Chinese Football Association) Jiangsu Shuntian
6	MF	Hou Lijia	3 October 1986 (aged 19)			(Chinese Football Association) Dalina Shide
7	MF	Xi Dingying	20 February 1986 (aged 20)			(Chinese Football Association) Shanghai Shenhua
8	MF	You Jia	24 November 1987 (aged 18)			(Chinese Football Association) Shanghai Shenhua
9	MF	Rao Huifang	13 March 1986 (aged 20)			(Chinese Football Association) Guangdong Xiongying
10	FW	Ma Xiaoxu (captain)	5 June 1988 (aged 18)			(Chinese Football Association) Dalina Shide
11	FW	Lou Xiaoxu	30 May 1986 (aged 20)			(Chinese Football Association) Changchun Yatai
12	FW	Zhu Wei	20 August 1988 (aged 17)			(Chinese Football Association) Jiangsu Shuntian
13	MF	Zhuang Ran	28 January 1986 (aged 20)			(Chinese Football Association) Sichuan Guangcheng
14	DF	Wang Dongni	19 December 1986 (aged 19)			(Chinese Football Association) Dalina Shide
15	DF	Yue Min	23 September 1987 (aged 18)			(Chinese Football Association) Wuhan Guoce
16	MF	Zhang Weishuang	25 January 1986 (aged 20)			(Chinese Football Association) Changchun Yatai
17	MF	Ma Zixiang	9 February 1988 (aged 18)			(Chinese Football Association) Beijing Chengjian
18	GK	Weng Xiaojie	27 July 1987 (aged 19)			(Chinese Football Association) Jiangsu Shuntian
19	FW	Zi Jingjing	13 November 1986 (aged 19)			(Chinese Football Association) Tianjin Teda
20	DF	Liu Xiaoyan	20 July 1987 (aged 19)			(Chinese Football Association) Shanghai Shenhua
21	GK	Xu Meishuang	28 May 1986 (aged 20)			(Chinese Football Association) Changchun Yatai

=== Finland ===
Coach: Jarmo Maitikainen

No.	Pos.	Player	Date of birth (age)	Caps	Goals	Club
1	GK	Tinja-Riikka Korpela	5 May 1986 (aged 20)			(Football Association of Finland) Honka
2	DF	Maija Saari (captain)	26 March 1986 (aged 20)			(Football Association of Finland) Honka
3	DF	Tuija Hyyrynen	10 March 1988 (aged 18)			(Football Association of Finland) HJK Helsinki
4	DF	Niina Hyvonen	10 May 1986 (aged 20)			(Football Association of Finland) KMF
5	DF	Hanna Hovi	15 June 1987 (aged 19)			(Football Association of Finland) TiPS
6	MF	Neea Berg	8 May 1987 (aged 19)			(Football Association of Finland) KMF
7	MF	Essi Sainio	9 September 1986 (aged 19)			(German Football Association) Turbine Potsdam
8	MF	Eeva Harkonen	11 February 1987 (aged 19)			(Football Association of Finland) TiPS
9	MF	Taru Laihanen	15 April 1986 (aged 20)			(Football Association of Finland) Honka
10	MF	Tytti Porkka	31 July 1988 (aged 18)			(Football Association of Finland) TiPS
11	MF	Susanna Hokkanen	13 November 1988 (aged 17)			(Football Association of Finland) HJK Helsinki
12	GK	Marjaana Kaaresvirta	19 December 1988 (aged 17)			(Football Association of Finland) KaaPo
13	FW	Leena Puranen	16 October 1986 (aged 19)			(Football Association of Finland) HJK Helsinki
14	FW	Heini Tiilikainen	19 December 1987 (aged 18)			(Football Association of Finland) KMF
15	DF	Kaisa Vuorela	20 January 1987 (aged 19)			(Football Association of Finland) TiPS
16	MF	Anna Westerlund	9 April 1989 (aged 17)			(Football Association of Finland) Honka
17	MF	Heidi Kivela	6 November 1988 (aged 17)			(Football Association of Finland) Ilves Tampere
18	FW	Linda Sallstrom	13 July 1988 (aged 18)			(Football Association of Finland) TiPS
19	FW	Sonja Suosalo	8 February 1987 (aged 19)			(Football Association of Finland) Honka
20	FW	Tiia Tikkanen	10 October 1990 (aged 15)			(Football Association of Finland) SCR
21	GK	Tinja Haikka	17 November 1990 (aged 15)			(Football Association of Finland) Ilves Tampere

=== Nigeria ===
Coach: Emmanuel T. Oknokwo

No.	Pos.	Player	Date of birth (age)	Caps	Goals	Club
1	GK	Tochukwu Oluehi	2 May 1987 (aged 19)			(Nigeria Football Federation) Bayelsa Queens
2	MF	Rita Chikwelu	6 March 1988 (aged 18)			(Football Association of Finland) United
3	MF	Akudo Sabi (captain)	17 November 1986 (aged 19)			(Nigeria Football Federation) Bayelsa Queens
4	MF	Maureen Eke	19 December 1986 (aged 19)			(Nigeria Football Federation) Delta Queens
5	DF	Omena Ogbimi	16 December 1986 (aged 19)			(Nigeria Football Federation) Nasarawa Amazons
6	DF	Faith Ikidi	28 February 1987 (aged 19)			(Swedish Football Association) QBIK
7	DF	Gladys Akpa	1 January 1986 (aged 20)			(Nigeria Football Federation) Nasarawa Amazons
8	DF	Chizoma Oparaocha	4 June 1986 (aged 20)			(Nigeria Football Federation) Delta Queens
9	FW	Akudo Iwuagwu	13 October 1986 (aged 19)			(Nigeria Football Federation) Delta Queens
10	MF	Titilayo Mekuleyi	14 July 1986 (aged 20)			(Nigeria Football Federation) Bayelsa Queens
11	FW	Stella Godwin	12 April 1986 (aged 20)			(Nigeria Football Federation) Delta Queens
12	GK	Christy Bulus	18 October 1988 (aged 17)			(Nigeria Football Federation) FCT Queens
13	FW	Ogonna Chukwudi	14 September 1988 (aged 17)			(Nigeria Football Federation) Nasarawa Amazons
14	FW	Tawa Ishola	23 December 1988 (aged 17)			(Nigeria Football Federation) Bayelsa Queens
15	DF	Hope Akor	18 May 1988 (aged 18)			(Nigeria Football Federation) Bayelsa Queens
16	DF	Ulumma Jerome	11 April 1988 (aged 18)			(Nigeria Football Federation) Rivers Angels
17	DF	Blessing Akusobi	17 August 1986 (aged 20)			(Nigeria Football Federation) Bayelsa Queens
18	FW	Cynthia Uwak	15 July 1986 (aged 20)			(Football Association of Finland) United
19	DF	Odishika Chukwuji	21 July 1987 (aged 19)			(Nigeria Football Federation) Bayelsa Queens
20	FW	Emueje Ogiagbehva	10 February 1990 (aged 16)			(Nigeria Football Federation) Pelican Stars
21	GK	Adefunke Okewole	24 June 1986 (aged 20)			(Nigeria Football Federation) Pelican Stars

== Group C ==
=== Germany ===
Coach: Maren Meinert

No.	Pos.	Player	Date of birth (age)	Caps	Goals	Club
1	GK	Tessa Rinkes	14 September 1986 (aged 19)			(German Football Association) Hamburger SV
2	DF	Janina Haye	10 August 1986 (aged 20)			(German Football Association) Hamburger SV
3	DF	Monique Kerschowski	22 January 1988 (aged 18)			(German Football Association) 1. FFC Turbine Potsdam
4	DF	Carolin Schiewe	23 October 1988 (aged 17)			(German Football Association) 1. FFC Turbine Potsdam
5	DF	Babett Peter	12 May 1988 (aged 18)			(German Football Association) 1. FFC Turbine Potsdam
6	MF	Meike Weber	30 March 1987 (aged 19)			(German Football Association) FFC Frankfurt
7	MF	Fatmire Bajramaj	1 April 1988 (aged 18)			(German Football Association) FCR Duisburg
8	MF	Lena Goeßling	8 March 1986 (aged 20)			(German Football Association) SC 07 Bad Neuenahr
9	FW	Ann-Christin Angel	9 September 1987 (aged 18)			(German Football Association) TuS Niederkirchen
10	MF	Célia Okoyino da Mbabi (captain)	27 June 1988 (aged 18)			(German Football Association) SC 07 Bad Neuenahr
11	FW	Simone Laudehr	12 July 1986 (aged 20)			(German Football Association) FCR Duisburg
12	GK	Romina Holz	27 January 1988 (aged 18)			(German Football Association) 1. FC Saarbrücken
13	DF	Juliane Hoefler	15 March 1987 (aged 19)			(German Football Association) 1. FFC Turbine Potsdam
14	FW	Anna Blässe	27 February 1987 (aged 19)			(German Football Association) Hamburger SV
15	FW	Jennifer Oster	2 March 1986 (aged 20)			(German Football Association) FCR Duisburg
16	DF	Josephine Schlanke	19 March 1988 (aged 18)			(German Football Association) 1. FFC Turbine Potsdam
17	FW	Lydia Neumann	11 November 1986 (aged 19)			(German Football Association) SC 07 Bad Neuenahr
18	FW	Juliane Maier	9 April 1987 (aged 19)			(German Football Association) SC Freiburg
19	DF	Corina Schroeder	15 August 1986 (aged 20)			(German Football Association) FCR Duisburg
20	MF	Nadine Keßler	4 April 1988 (aged 18)			(German Football Association) 1. FC Saarbrücken
21	GK	Verena Brammer	2 September 1986 (aged 19)			(German Football Association) VfL Wolfsburg

=== North Korea ===
Coach: Choe Kwang-sok

No.	Pos.	Player	Date of birth (age)	Caps	Goals	Club
1	GK	Jon Myong-hui	7 August 1986 (aged 20)			(DPR Korea Football Association) Rimyongsu
2	MF	Jo Yun-mi	5 January 1987 (aged 19)			(DPR Korea Football Association) April 25 Sports Group
3	FW	Ri Un-suk	1 January 1986 (aged 20)			(DPR Korea Football Association) April 25 Sports Group
4	FW	O Kum-hui	2 August 1987 (aged 19)			(DPR Korea Football Association) Amrokgang
5	DF	Kim Hyon-suk	4 July 1986 (aged 20)			(DPR Korea Football Association) Pyongyang
6	MF	Kim Chun-hui	20 April 1989 (aged 17)			(DPR Korea Football Association) Rimyongsu
7	MF	Kim Song-hui	23 February 1987 (aged 19)			(DPR Korea Football Association) Pyongyang
8	GK	Min Jong-rim	10 September 1986 (aged 19)			(DPR Korea Football Association) Amrokgang
9	DF	Ri Song-sim	7 November 1986 (aged 19)			(DPR Korea Football Association) Pyongyang
10	FW	Jong Pok-hui	31 July 1988 (aged 18)			(DPR Korea Football Association) April 25 Sports Group
11	FW	Ra Un-sim	2 July 1988 (aged 18)			(DPR Korea Football Association) Amrokgang
12	FW	Ri Jong-sim	20 November 1988 (aged 17)			(DPR Korea Football Association) Amrokgang
13	MF	Kim Ok-sim	2 July 1987 (aged 19)			(DPR Korea Football Association) Rimyongsu
14	MF	Ri Jin-hui	3 May 1987 (aged 19)			(DPR Korea Football Association) Rimyongsu
15	FW	Kil Son-hui	7 March 1986 (aged 20)			(DPR Korea Football Association) Rimyongsu
16	DF	Hong Myong-gum (captain)	10 July 1986 (aged 20)			(DPR Korea Football Association) Amrokgang
17	DF	Ri Un-hyang	15 May 1988 (aged 18)			(DPR Korea Football Association) Amrokgang
18	GK	Jong Ryon-hui	1 July 1987 (aged 19)			(DPR Korea Football Association) April 25 Sports Group
19	DF	Ri Jin-ok	4 August 1987 (aged 19)			(DPR Korea Football Association) Pyongyang
20	MF	Kim Kyong-hwa	28 March 1986 (aged 20)			(DPR Korea Football Association) April 25 Sports Group
21	MF	Kim Hyang-mi	15 January 1986 (aged 20)			(DPR Korea Football Association) Rimyongsu

=== Mexico ===
Coach: (Mexico) Leonardo Cuéllar

No.	Pos.	Player	Date of birth (age)	Caps	Goals	Club
1	GK	Anjulí Ladrón	7 October 1986 (aged 19)			(Mexican Football Federation) Chivas Guadalajara
2	DF	María de Lourdes Gordillo (captain)	3 April 1986 (aged 20)			(Mexican Football Federation) Mexico FC
3	DF	Nancy Gutiérrez	2 June 1987 (aged 19)			(United States Soccer Federation) Cerritos College Falcons
4	DF	Leticia Villalpando	8 January 1988 (aged 18)			(United States Soccer Federation) Vista del Lago HS
5	MF	Isabel Valdez	19 May 1986 (aged 20)			(Mexican Football Federation) Mexico FC
6	MF	Christine Nieva	7 October 1986 (aged 19)			(United States Soccer Federation) Arizona State Sun Devils
7	FW	Janet Méndez	24 August 1988 (aged 17)			(United States Soccer Federation) Arsenal Soccer
8	MF	Rebecca Juárez	13 December 1986 (aged 19)			(Mexican Football Federation) Mexico FC
9	FW	Mónica Ocampo	4 January 1987 (aged 19)			(Mexican Football Federation) Gacelas Univac
10	FW	Charlyn Corral	11 September 1991 (aged 14)			(Mexican Football Federation) Andrea's Soccer
11	MF	Tania Morales	22 December 1986 (aged 19)			(Mexican Football Federation) Chivas Guadalajara
12	GK	Erika Vanegas	7 July 1988 (aged 18)			(Mexican Football Federation) Guerreras
13	DF	Marisol Arévalo	8 June 1987 (aged 19)			(United States Soccer Federation) Ventura College Pirates
14	DF	Alexandra Velázquez	24 April 1988 (aged 18)			(Mexican Football Federation) UJED
15	DF	Norma Méndez	10 March 1987 (aged 19)			(United States Soccer Federation) Arsenal Soccer
16	DF	Janelly Farías	12 February 1990 (aged 16)			(United States Soccer Federation) Inland United
17	MF	Areli Martínez	11 March 1988 (aged 18)			(Mexican Football Federation) Seleccion Jalisco
18	FW	Monique Cisneros	17 November 1989 (aged 16)			(United States Soccer Federation) Cerritos College Falcons
19	FW	Nancy Gandarilla	30 January 1987 (aged 19)			(Mexican Football Federation) Club América
20	GK	Ivette Esqueda	22 June 1988 (aged 18)			(United States Soccer Federation) Santa Anita
21	FW	Jackie Acevedo	18 January 1987 (aged 19)			(United States Soccer Federation) Tennessee Volunteers

=== Switzerland ===
Coach: Claudio Taddei

No.	Pos.	Player	Date of birth (age)	Caps	Goals	Club
1	GK	Stenia Michel	23 October 1987 (aged 18)			(Swiss Football Association) FC Zürich Seebach
2	DF	Caroline Abbé	13 January 1988 (aged 18)			(Swiss Football Association) Yverdon
3	FW	Ramona Bachmann	25 December 1990 (aged 15)			(Swiss Football Association) Malters
4	DF	Sandra Betschart	30 March 1989 (aged 17)			(Swiss Football Association) FC Zürich Seebach
5	DF	Barbara Beutler	4 February 1989 (aged 17)			(Swiss Football Association) Schwerzenbach
6	MF	Beatrice Burger	2 April 1986 (aged 20)			(Swiss Football Association) Schwerzenbach
7	FW	Vanessa Bürki	1 April 1986 (aged 20)			(German Football Association) Bayern Munich
8	MF	Vanessa Bernauer	23 March 1988 (aged 18)			(Swiss Football Association) FC Zürich Seebach
9	MF	Rahel Graf	1 February 1989 (aged 17)			(Swiss Football Association) LUwin.ch
10	DF	Isabelle Kaufmann	19 June 1986 (aged 20)			(Swiss Football Association) LUwin.ch
11	MF	Sandy Maendly	4 April 1988 (aged 18)			(Swiss Football Association) FFC Bern
12	GK	Gaëlle Thalmann	18 January 1986 (aged 20)			(Swiss Football Association) LUwin.ch
13	FW	Vlora Mehmetaj	8 May 1988 (aged 18)			(Swiss Football Association) Yverdon
14	MF	Isabelle Meyer	5 September 1987 (aged 18)			(Swiss Football Association) LUwin.ch
15	MF	Martina Moser (captain)	9 April 1986 (aged 20)			(Swiss Football Association) LUwin.ch
16	FW	Camille Raemy	Missing required parameter 1=month! (aged −20)			(Swiss Football Association) Yverdon
17	FW	Maeva Sarrasin	10 June 1987 (aged 19)			(Swiss Football Association) Yverdon
18	DF	Flavia Schwarz	7 November 1986 (aged 19)			(Swiss Football Association) FC Zürich Seebach
19	DF	Francesca Stillhard	28 September 1989 (aged 16)			(Swiss Football Association) Schwerzenbach
20	MF	Simone Zahno	11 May 1988 (aged 18)			(Swiss Football Association) FFC Zuchwil
21	GK	Nadja Achermann	10 July 1988 (aged 18)			(Swiss Football Association) DSK Root

== Group D ==
=== Argentina ===
Coach: José Carlos Borrello

No.	Pos.	Player	Date of birth (age)	Caps	Goals	Club
1	GK	Elisabeth Minnig	6 January 1987 (aged 19)			(Argentine Football Association) AFA
2	DF	Eva González (captain)	2 September 1987 (aged 18)			(Argentine Football Association) Boca Juniors
3	DF	Catalina Pérez	16 February 1989 (aged 17)			(Argentine Football Association) River Plate
4	DF	Ruth Leiva	28 June 1988 (aged 18)			(Argentine Football Association) River Plate
5	MF	Florencia Quiñones	26 August 1986 (aged 19)			(Argentine Football Association) San Lorenzo
6	DF	Marisa Farina	16 June 1986 (aged 20)			(Argentine Football Association) AFA
7	FW	Ludmila Manicler	6 July 1987 (aged 19)			(Argentine Football Association) Independiente
8	MF	Florencia Mandrile	10 February 1988 (aged 18)			(Argentine Football Association) San Lorenzo
9	FW	Maria Potassa	12 December 1988 (aged 17)			(Argentine Football Association) Rosario Central
10	FW	Analía Hirmbruchner	10 January 1989 (aged 17)			(Argentine Football Association) Independiente
11	MF	Mercedes Pereyra	7 May 1987 (aged 19)			(Argentine Football Association) River Plate
12	GK	Maria Lobo	5 September 1987 (aged 18)			(Argentine Football Association) AFA
13	DF	Lucia Dubracich	2 March 1990 (aged 16)			(Argentine Football Association) AFA
14	MF	Joanna Bracamonte	21 June 1989 (aged 17)			(Argentine Football Association) Independiente
15	MF	Mariana Suarez	5 November 1986 (aged 19)			(Argentine Football Association) Boca Juniors
16	DF	Gabriela Chávez	9 April 1989 (aged 17)			(Argentine Football Association) Independiente
17	DF	Liliana Casas	30 November 1986 (aged 19)			(Argentine Football Association) Independiente
18	MF	Emilia Mendieta	4 February 1988 (aged 18)			(Argentine Football Association) AFA
19	MF	Maria Blanco	5 December 1987 (aged 18)			(Argentine Football Association) AFA
20	FW	Amancay Urbani	7 December 1991 (aged 14)			(Argentine Football Association) AFA
21	FW	Vanesa Bertaz	17 March 1987 (aged 19)			(Argentine Football Association) AFA

=== France ===
Coach: Stéphane Pilard

No.	Pos.	Player	Date of birth (age)	Caps	Goals	Club
1	GK	Emmeline Mainguy	12 June 1988 (aged 18)			(French Football Federation) Condé-sur-Noireau
2	DF	Sabrina Delannoy	18 May 1986 (aged 20)			(French Football Federation) Paris Saint-Germain
3	DF	Laure Boulleau (captain)	22 October 1986 (aged 19)			(French Football Federation) Paris Saint-Germain
4	DF	Morgane Courteille	23 December 1987 (aged 18)			(French Football Federation) Paris Saint-Germain
5	DF	Coralie Ducher	11 September 1986 (aged 19)			(French Football Federation) FCF Lyon
6	MF	Caroline Pizzala	23 November 1987 (aged 18)			(French Football Federation) Celtic Marseilles
7	MF	Jessica Houara	29 September 1987 (aged 18)			(French Football Federation) Celtic Marseilles
8	MF	Meriame Ben Abdelwahab	19 December 1986 (aged 19)			(French Football Federation) Paris Saint-Germain
9	FW	Élodie Thomis	13 August 1986 (aged 20)			(French Football Federation) Montpellier
10	MF	Louisa Nécib	23 January 1987 (aged 19)			(French Football Federation) Montpellier
11	DF	Melodie Coudray	15 May 1987 (aged 19)			(French Football Federation) Le Mans
12	DF	Gwenaelle Pele	18 May 1986 (aged 20)			(French Football Federation) FCF Lyon
13	DF	Elodie Cordier	2 February 1988 (aged 18)			(French Football Federation) CNFE
14	MF	Inès Dhaou	6 February 1988 (aged 18)			(French Football Federation) CNFE
15	DF	Emilie L'Huillier	3 July 1986 (aged 20)			(French Football Federation) Paris Saint-Germain
16	GK	Sarah Bouhaddi	17 October 1986 (aged 19)			(French Football Federation) Juvisy
17	FW	Helene Plu	25 September 1988 (aged 17)			(French Football Federation) Le Mans
18	FW	Marie-Laure Delie	29 January 1988 (aged 18)			(French Football Federation) CNFE
19	DF	Livia Jean	24 July 1988 (aged 18)			(French Football Federation) Stade Briochin
20	MF	Amandine Henry	28 September 1989 (aged 16)			(French Football Federation) CNFE
21	GK	Audrey Arraby	21 May 1987 (aged 19)			(French Football Federation) Nord Allier

=== DR Congo ===
Coach: Poly Bonghanya

No.	Pos.	Player	Date of birth (age)	Caps	Goals	Club
1	GK	Mamie Buazo	24 December 1988 (aged 17)			(Congolese Association Football Federation) CS Grand Hôtel
2	DF	Pitshou Tezi	31 December 1987 (aged 18)			(Congolese Association Football Federation) FCF Milinga
3	DF	Lucie Mengi	15 July 1991 (aged 15)			(Congolese Association Football Federation) FT Mondo
4	FW	Trésorine Nzuzi	11 October 1988 (aged 17)			(Congolese Association Football Federation) CSF Batende
5	DF	Guyssie Kiuvu (captain)	5 February 1988 (aged 18)			(Congolese Association Football Federation) CS Grand Hôtel
6	DF	Nanu Mafuala	22 July 1988 (aged 18)			(Congolese Association Football Federation) CS Grand Hôtel
7	DF	Oliva Amani	22 August 1988 (aged 17)			(Congolese Association Football Federation) La Source de Kivu
8	MF	Olga Wadio	1 April 1988 (aged 18)			(Congolese Association Football Federation) CS Grand Hôtel
9	FW	Annette Nshimire	10 October 1988 (aged 17)			(Congolese Association Football Federation) La Source de Kivu
10	MF	Arlette Mafuta	3 September 1988 (aged 17)			(Congolese Association Football Federation) CS Grand Hôtel
11	MF	Nanouche Lumbu	4 December 1988 (aged 17)			(Congolese Association Football Federation) CS Grand Hôtel
12	FW	Mify Zenga	7 February 1990 (aged 16)			(Congolese Association Football Federation) CSF Batende
13	MF	Charmante Nsimba	3 March 1988 (aged 18)			(Congolese Association Football Federation) CS Grand Hôtel
14	DF	Mireille Kuyangisa	1 January 1989 (aged 17)			(Congolese Association Football Federation) FCF Milinga
15	MF	Christine Bongo	24 July 1988 (aged 18)			(Congolese Association Football Federation) FCF Milinga
16	GK	Francine Bahati	27 December 1987 (aged 18)			(Congolese Association Football Federation) La Source de Kivu
17	DF	Pamela Malembo	9 April 1989 (aged 17)			(Congolese Association Football Federation) CS Grand Hôtel
18	DF	Nicky Elongo	9 April 1991 (aged 15)			(Congolese Association Football Federation) ASF Academia
19	DF	Thethe Nlenvo	26 February 1989 (aged 17)			(Congolese Association Football Federation) MCF Bilenge
20	FW	Natha Essandja	4 February 1989 (aged 17)			(Congolese Association Football Federation) CS Grand Hôtel
21	GK	Dina Lusandu	2 July 1987 (aged 19)			(Congolese Association Football Federation) FCF Bumbu

=== United States ===
Coach: Tim Schulz

No.	Pos.	Player	Date of birth (age)	Caps	Goals	Club
1	GK	Val Henderson	19 April 1986 (aged 20)			(United States Soccer Federation) UCLA Bruins
2	MF	Jordan Angeli	31 May 1986 (aged 20)			(United States Soccer Federation) Santa Clara Broncos
3	DF	Stephanie Logterman	25 February 1986 (aged 20)			(United States Soccer Federation) Texas Longhorns
4	DF	Nikki Krzysik	23 May 1987 (aged 19)			(United States Soccer Federation) Virginia Cavaliers
5	DF	Sarah Wagenfuhr	31 December 1986 (aged 19)			(United States Soccer Federation) Florida State Seminoles
6	DF	Stephanie Lopez (captain)	3 April 1986 (aged 20)			(United States Soccer Federation) Portland Pilots
7	MF	Amanda Poach	25 July 1987 (aged 19)			(United States Soccer Federation) Santa Clara Broncos
8	FW	Lauren Cheney	30 September 1987 (aged 18)			(United States Soccer Federation) UCLA Bruins
9	MF	Danesha Adams	6 June 1986 (aged 20)			(United States Soccer Federation) UCLA Bruins
10	MF	Brittany Bock	11 April 1987 (aged 19)			(United States Soccer Federation) Notre Dame Fighting Irish
11	MF	Tobin Heath	29 May 1988 (aged 18)			(United States Soccer Federation) North Carolina Tar Heels
12	FW	Amy Rodriguez	17 February 1987 (aged 19)			(United States Soccer Federation) USC Trojans
13	MF	Tina DiMartino	6 November 1986 (aged 19)			(United States Soccer Federation) UCLA Bruins
14	MF	Alexandra Long	13 August 1987 (aged 19)			(United States Soccer Federation) Penn State Nittany Lions
15	DF	Carrie Dew	8 December 1986 (aged 19)			(United States Soccer Federation) Notre Dame Fighting Irish
16	DF	Erin Hardy	16 September 1986 (aged 19)			(United States Soccer Federation) UCLA Bruins
17	FW	Jessica Roestedt	3 March 1986 (aged 20)			(United States Soccer Federation) Virginia Cavaliers
18	GK	Kelsey Davis	14 May 1987 (aged 19)			(United States Soccer Federation) Portland Pilots
19	FW	Kelley O'Hara	4 August 1988 (aged 18)			(United States Soccer Federation) Stanford Cardinal
20	MF	Casey Nogueira	23 February 1989 (aged 17)			(United States Soccer Federation) North Carolina Tar Heels
21	GK	Joanna Haig	16 April 1986 (aged 20)			(United States Soccer Federation) Louisville Cardinals
