= 2006 FIFA U-20 Women's World Championship =

FIFA U-20 Women's World Championship Russia 2006 Чемпионат мира по футболу 2006 (девушки до 20 лет)

Tournament details
- Host country: Russia
- Dates: 17 August – 3 September
- Teams: 16 (from 6 confederations)
- Venues: 5 (in 2 host cities)

Final positions
- Champions: North Korea (1st title)
- Runners-up: China
- Third place: Brazil
- Fourth place: United States

Tournament statistics
- Matches played: 32
- Goals scored: 106 (3.31 per match)
- Attendance: 52,630 (1,645 per match)
- Top scorer(s): (China) Ma Xiaoxu (North Korea) Kim Song-hui (5 goals)
- Best player: (China) Ma Xiaoxu
- Fair play award: North Korea; Russia

The 2006 FIFA U-20 Women's World Championship was held in Russia from 17 August to 3 September 2006. It was the officially recognized world championship for women's under-20 national association football teams. Matches were held in four Moscow stadiums (Dynamo, Lokomotiv, Podmoskovie Stadium and Torpedo Stadium) and one in Saint Petersburg (Petrovsky Stadium).

This was the third women's world youth championship organized by FIFA, but the first with an age limit of 20. The first two events, held in Canada in 2002 and Thailand in 2004, had an age limit of 19. FIFA changed the age limit to prepare for the creation of an under-17 championship in 2008.

North Korea won the tournament. They became the first Asian team to win a FIFA women's tournament and the first Asian football team to win any FIFA tournaments since Saudi Arabia's triumph in the 1989 FIFA U-16 World Championship. The official mascot is a little fox called Alissa.

== Venues ==
City	Stadium	Capacity
Saint Petersburg	Petrovsky Stadium	21,570
Moscow	Torpedo Stadium	13,400
Shchyolkovo	Podmoskovie Stadium	5,000
Moscow	Dynamo Stadium	36,540
Moscow	Locomotiv Stadium	28,800

== Qualified teams ==
The 16 participating U-20 women's teams from the six FIFA confederations are:

Confederation (Continent)	Qualifying Tournament	Qualifier(s)
AFC (Asia)	2006 AFC U-19 Women's Championship	China; North Korea^{1} Australia
CAF (Africa)	2006 African U-20 Women's World Cup Qualifying Tournament	Nigeria; DR Congo^{1}
CONCACAF (North, Central America & Caribbean)	2006 CONCACAF Under 19 Women's Qualifying Tournament	United States; Canada; Mexico
CONMEBOL (South America)	2006 South American Under-20 Women's Football Championship	Brazil; Argentina^{1}
OFC (Oceania)	2004 OFC Under-19 Women's Qualifying Tournament	New Zealand^{1}
UEFA (Europe)	Host nation	Russia
UEFA (Europe)	2005 UEFA Women's Under-19 Championship	France; Germany; Finland^{1} Switzerland^{1}

1.Teams that made their debut.

== Group stage ==
The draw for the tournament was held in Moscow's City Hall on 22 March 2006. 14 of the 16 competing teams (the two CAF teams were then still undecided) learned their first-round groupings.

=== Group A ===
Team	Pts	Pld	W	D	L	GF	GA	GD
Brazil	5	3	1	2	0	2	0	+2
Russia	5	3	1	2	0	4	3	+1
Australia	4	3	1	1	1	4	3	+1
New Zealand	1	3	0	1	2	2	6	−4

All times local (UTC+4)

17 August 2006
16:00

New Zealand	0–3	Australia
	(Report)	McCallum 39' 80'; Shipard 90+3'

Petrovsky Stadium, Saint Petersburg
Attendance: 1,100
Referee: Gyöngyi Gaál (Hungary)

17 August 2006
19:00

Russia	0–0	Brazil
	(Report)

Petrovsky Stadium
Attendance: 10,200
Referee: Jenny Palmqvist (Sweden)

20 August 2006
16:00

Brazil	2–0	Australia
Francielle 42'; Fabiana 69'	{Report}

Petrovsky Stadium
Attendance: 700
Referee: Jennifer Bennett (United States)

20 August 2006
19:00

Russia	3–2	New Zealand
Kozhnikova 5'; Terekhova 14'; Akimova 90+3'	(Report)	Erceg 18'; Humphries 56'

Petrovsky Stadium
Attendance: 3,400
Referee: Hong Eun-ah (South Korea)

23 August 2006
16:00

Brazil	0–0	New Zealand
	(Report)

Podmoskovie Stadium, Shchyolkovo
Attendance: 500
Referee: Shane De Silva (Trinidad and Tobago)

23 August 2006
16:00

Australia	1–1	Russia
Brogan 85'	(Report)	Kozhnikova 75'

Torpedo Stadium, Moscow
Attendance: 1,000
Referee: Christine Beck (Germany)

=== Group B ===
Team	Pts	Pld	W	D	L	GF	GA	GD
China	9	3	3	0	0	6	1	+5
Nigeria	6	3	2	0	1	11	5	+6
Canada	3	3	1	0	2	4	4	0
Finland	0	3	0	0	3	1	12	−11

17 August 2006
16:00

China	2–1	Finland
Ma 37' (pen.); Zi 72'	(Report)	Yuan 2' (o.g.)

Podmoskovie Stadium, Shchyolkovo
Attendance: 2000
Referee: Diane Ferreira-James (Guyana)

17 August 2006
19:00

Nigeria	3–2	Canada
Ishola 29'; Uwak 82' 90+1'	(Report)	Kyle 25'; Cicchini 71'

Podmoskovie Stadium
Attendance: 800
Referee: Bentla de Coth (India)

20 August 2006
16:00

Finland	0–2	Canada
	(Report)	Robinson 39' (pen.) 70'

Podmoskovie Stadium
Attendance: 1200
Referee: Natalie Avdonchenko (Russia)

20 August 2006
19:00

China	3–0	Nigeria
Lou 9'; Ma 31' 69'	(Report)

Podmoskovie Stadium
Attendance: 2000
Referee: Christine Beck (Germany)

23 August 2006
19:00

Finland	0–8	Nigeria
	(Report)	Sabi 7' 42'; Eke 13' 65' 79'; Uwak 15'; Chikwelu 47' 73'

Podmoskovie Stadium
Attendance: 400
Referee: Jennifer Bennett (United States)

23 August 2006
19:00

Canada	0–1	China
	(Report)	Ma 48'

Torpedo Stadium, Moscow
Attendance: 100
Referee: Claudine Brohet (Belgium)

=== Group C ===
Team	Pts	Pld	W	D	L	GF	GA	GD
North Korea	9	3	3	0	0	10	0	+10
Germany	6	3	2	0	1	15	3	+12
Mexico	3	3	1	0	2	5	15	−10
Switzerland	0	3	0	0	3	2	14	−12

18 August 2006
16:00

Switzerland	2–4	Mexico
Bürki 12' 65'	(Report)	Corral 15' 45+2'; Gordillo 30'; Ocampo 90+2'

Dynamo Stadium, Moscow
Attendance: 3500
Referee: Tammy Ogston (Australia)

18 August 2006
19:00

North Korea	2–0	Germany
Jong P. 35'; Jo 70'	(Report)

Dynamo Stadium
Attendance: 700
Referee: Fatou Gaye (Senegal)

21 August 2006
16:00

Mexico	1–9	Germany
Cisneros 76'	(Report)	Okoyino Da Mbabi 24'; Bajramaj 29'; Keßler 31'; Blässe 37' 44' 84'; Laudehr 49'; Maier 58'; Oster 77'

Dynamo Stadium
Attendance: 500
Referee: Gyöngyi Gaál (Hungary)

21 August 2006
19:00

Switzerland	0–4	North Korea
	(Report)	Jong P. 45+1'; Kim O. 50'; Kim S. 78' 80'

Dynamo Stadium
Attendance: 600
Referee: Shane De Silva (Trinidad and Tobago)

24 August 2006
16:00

Germany	6–0	Switzerland
Bajramaj 4' 62'; Laudehr 21'; Okoyino Da Mbabi 45'; Keßler 85'; Blässe 89'	(Report)

Petrovsky Stadium, Saint Petersburg
Attendance: 300
Referee: Dianne Ferreira-James (Guyana)

24 August 2006
16:00

Mexico	0–4	North Korea
	(Report)	Kim Hyang-mi 33'; Kim K. 35'; Kil 42'; O 59'

Dynamo Stadium
Attendance: 500
Referee: Natalia Avdonchenko (Russia)

=== Group D ===
Team	Pts	Pld	W	D	L	GF	GA	GD
United States	9	3	3	0	0	7	2	+5
France	6	3	2	0	1	6	1	+5
Argentina	3	3	1	0	2	5	9	−4
DR Congo	0	3	0	0	3	1	7	−6

18 August 2006
16:00

DR Congo	1–2	United States
Nzuzi 70'	(Report)	O'Hara 33'; Rodriguez 65' (pen.)

Torpedo Stadium, Moscow
Attendance: 300
Referee: Claudine Brohet (Belgium)

18 August 2006
19:00

France	5–0	Argentina
Boulleau 12'; Delie 28' 65'; Necib 51'; Houra 85'	(Report)

Torpedo Stadium
Attendance: 250
Referee: Shane de Silva (Trinidad and Tobago)

21 August 2006
16:00

United States	4–1	Argentina
Rostedt 13'; Adams 38'; Long 62'; Nogueira 90+1'	(Report)	Pereyra 53'

Torpedo Stadium
Attendance: 200
Referee: Fatou Gaye (Senegal)

21 August 2006
19:00

DR Congo	0–1	France
	(Report)	Henry 45'

Torpedo Stadium
Attendance: 130
Referee: Tammy Ogston (Australia)

24 August 2006
19:00

Argentina	4–0	DR Congo
Manicler 13' 17' 45+2'; Potassa 15'	(Report)

Petrovsky Stadium, Saint Petersburg
Attendance: 450
Referee: Bentla de Coth (India)

24 August 2006
19:00

United States	1–0	France
Rostedt 61'	(Report)

Dynamo Stadium, Moscow
Attendance: 300
Referee: Hong Eun-ah (South Korea)

== Knockout stage ==
Quarter-finals
26 August – Moscow (Torpedo)
Brazil	2
Nigeria	1
27 August – Saint Petersburg
North Korea	2
France	1
26 August – Moscow (Torpedo)
China	4
Russia	0
27 August – Saint Petersburg
United States	4
Germany	1

Semi-finals
31 August – Moscow (Lokomotiv)
Brazil	0
North Korea	1
31 August – Moscow (Lokomotiv)
China (p)	0 (5)
United States	0 (4)

Final
3 September – Moscow (Lokomotiv)
North Korea	5
China	0
Third place play-off
3 September – Moscow (Lokomotiv)
Brazil (p)	0 (6)
United States	0 (5)

=== Quarterfinals ===
26 August 2006
16:00

Brazil	2–1	Nigeria
Fabiana 45+2'; Adriane 90+5'	(Report)	Uwak 65'

Torpedo Stadium, Moscow
Attendance: 700
Referee: Natalia Avdonchenko (Russia)

26 August 2006
19:00

China	4–0	Russia
Zi 8'; Ma 19'; Zhang 40'; You 60'	(Report)

Torpedo Stadium
Attendance: 2,000
Referee: Gyöngyi Gaál (Hungary)

27 August 2006
16:00

North Korea	2–1	France
Kim K. 46'; Hong 90'	(Report)	Thomis 62'

Petrovsky Stadium, Saint Petersburg
Attendance: 550
Referee: Jennifer Bennett (United States)

27 August 2006
19:00

United States	4–1	Germany
O'Hara 36'; Adams 37' 70'; Rodriguez 90'	(Report)	Neumann 65'

Petrovsky Stadium
Attendance: 750
Referee: Jenny Palmqvist (Sweden)

=== Semifinals ===
31 August 2006
16:00

Brazil	0–1	North Korea
	(Report)	Ri Un-hyang 87'

Locomotiv Stadium, Moscow
Attendance: 1000
Referee: Christine Beck (Germany)

31 August 2006
19:00

China	0–0 (a.e.t.)	United States
	(Report)
Penalties
Zhuang (penalty scored); Zhang (penalty scored); Yuan (penalty scored); Zi (penalty scored); Ma (penalty missed); Zhu (penalty scored)	5–4	(penalty scored) Dew; (penalty scored) Adams; (penalty scored) Poach; (penalty scored) Lopez; (penalty missed) Bock; (penalty missed) Cheney

Locomotiv Stadium
Attendance: 1000
Referee: Tammy Ogston (Australia)

=== Third place play-off ===
3 September 2006
16:00

Brazil	0–0 (a.e.t.)	United States
	(Report)
Penalties
Daiane (penalty scored); Costa (penalty missed); Aliane (penalty scored); Francielle (penalty scored); Monica (penalty scored); Fabiana (penalty scored); Erika (penalty missed); Maurine (penalty scored)	6–5	(penalty scored) Dew; (penalty missed) Long; (penalty scored) Angeli; (penalty scored) Heath; (penalty scored) Adams; (penalty scored) Lopez; (penalty missed) Rodriguez; (penalty missed) Poach

Locomotiv Stadium
Attendance: 7,000
Referee: Jenny Palmqvist (Sweden)

=== Final ===
3 September 2006
19:00

North Korea	5–0	China
Jo 29'; Kim S. 39', 45+2', 52'; Kil 56'	(report)

Locomotiv Stadium
Attendance: 8,500
Referee: Jennifer Bennett (United States)

2006 FIFA U-20 Women's World Championship winners

North Korea
First title

== Awards ==
The following awards were given for the tournament:

Golden Ball	Silver Ball	Bronze Ball
(China) Ma Xiaoxu	(China) Zhang Yanru	(United States) Danesha Adams
Golden Shoe	Silver Shoe	Bronze Shoe
(China) Ma Xiaoxu	(North Korea) Kim Song-hui	(Germany) Anna Blässe
5 goals	5 goals	4 goals
FIFA Fair Play Award (Note: The archived FIFA page for this event identifies a single winner, Russia. The November 2006 FIFA magazine and the Official event's Report and Statistics document identify two winners. According to FIFA Committee for Fair Play and Social Responsibility two teams won the Fair Play award after having the same points in all criteria.)
North Korea and Russia

=== All star team ===
Goalkeepers	Defenders	Midfielders	Forwards
(China) Zhang Yanru (United States) Valerie Henderson	(Brazil) Daiane (France) Coralie Butcher (Germany) Babett Peter (North Korea) Hong Myong-gum (North Korea) Ri Jin-ok (North Korea) Ri Un-hyang	(Australia) Collette McCallum (Nigeria) Cynthia Uwak (Germany) Celia Okoyino Da Mbabi (North Korea) Kim Kyong-hwa (North Korea) Kim Chun-hui (United States) Amanda Poach	(Brazil) Fabiana (China) Ma Xiaoxu (France) Amandine Henry (Nigeria) Rita Chikwelu (North Korea) Kil Son-hui (Russia) Elena Danilova (United States) Danesha Adams

== Scorers ==
5 goals

- (China) Ma Xiaoxu
- (North Korea) Kim Song-hui

4 goals

- (Germany) Anna Blässe
- (Nigeria) Cynthia Uwak

3 goals

- (Argentina) Ludmila Manicler
- (Germany) Fatmire Bajramaj
- (Nigeria) Maureen Eke
- (United States) Danesha Adams

2 goals

- (Australia) Collette McCallum
- (Brazil) Fabiana
- (Canada) Jodi-Ann Robinson
- (China) Zi Jingjing
- (France) Marie-Laure Delie
- (Germany) Nadine Kessler
- (Germany) Simone Laudehr
- (Germany) Célia Okoyino Da Mbabi
- (Mexico) Charlyn Corral
- (Nigeria) Rita Chikwelu
- (Nigeria) Akudo Sabi
- (North Korea) Jo Yun-mi
- (North Korea) Jong Pok-hui
- (North Korea) Kil Son-hui
- (North Korea) Kim Kyong-hwa
- (Russia) Anna Kozhnikova
- (Switzerland) Vanessa Bürki
- (United States) Amy Rodriguez
- (United States) Jessica Rostedt
- (United States) Kelley O'Hara

1 goal

- (Argentina) Mercedes Pereyra
- (Argentina) Belén Potassa
- (Australia) Danielle Brogan
- (Australia) Sally Shipard
- (Brazil) Adriane
- (Brazil) Francielle
- (Canada) Amanda Chiccini
- (Canada) Kaylyn Kyle
- (China) Lou Xiaoxu
- (China) You Jia
- (China) Zhang Weishuang
- (Democratic Republic of the Congo) Trésorine Nzuzi
- (France) Laure Boulleau
- (France) Amandine Henry
- (France) Jessica Houara
- (France) Louisa Necib
- (Germany) Juliane Maier
- (Germany) Lydia Neumann
- (Germany) Jennifer Oster
- (Mexico) Monique Cisneros
- (Mexico) Maria de Lourdes Gordillo
- (Mexico) Mónica Ocampo
- (New Zealand) Abby Erceg
- (New Zealand) Emma Humphries
- (Nigeria) Tawa Ishola
- (North Korea) Hong Myong-gum
- (North Korea) O Kum-hui
- (North Korea) Ri Un-hyang
- (North Korea) Kim Hyang-mi
- (North Korea) Kim Ok-sim
- (Russia) Svetlana Akimova
- (Russia) Elena Terekhova
- (United States) Alexandra Long
- (United States) Casey Nogueira

Own goals

- (China) Yuan Fan (for Finland)

== Further information ==
- This was the first time an Australian football team has played in a worldwide competition as an Asian Football Confederation team. However, the country's senior men's team was the first to play as an AFC team, competing in its first 2007 Asian Cup qualifier in February 2006, two months before the AFC qualifiers for this competition. Before 1 January 2006, Australia was a member of the Oceania Football Confederation.
- This was the first U-20 Women's tournament in which a Canadian has not won the Golden Shoe award, given to the top goal scorer of the tournament. Canadians Christine Sinclair and Brittany Timko won the award in 2002 and 2004 respectively.
