= Clotilde Essiane =

Cameroonian boxer (born 1985)

Personal information
- Nicknames: Junior; Francisca Mbang
- Nationality: Cameroonian
- Born: 6 August 1985 (age 41) Yaoundé, Cameroon
- Height: 1.80 m (5 ft 11 in)
- Weight: Middleweight
- Martial arts career
- Nickname: Junior
- Weight: 75 kg (165 lb; 11 st 11 lb)
- Division: Featherweight
- Fighting out of: South Africa

Other information
Association football career
- Position: Centre-forward
Senior career*
Years	Team	Apps	(Gls)
2004	TKC		(17)
2006	Las Vegas		
International career
2006–2007	Equatorial Guinea		(5)
- * Club domestic league appearances and goals

Boxing career

Clotilde Essiane aka Junior (born 6 August 1985) is a Cameroonian boxer, mixed martial artist and a retired footballer, who currently lives in Johannesburg, South Africa.

== Boxing career ==
Essiane represented Cameroon at the 2018 Commonwealth Games and she was their flag bearer at the Parade of Nations during the opening ceremony. She lost to Tammara Thibeault from Canada in the women's middleweight competition quarterfinals.

== Mixed martial arts career ==
In 2016, Essiane defeated Bunmi Ojewole from Nigeria and Rushda Mallick and Ansie Van Der Marwe, both from South Africa.

== Football career ==
=== Club career ===
Essiane scored 17 goals for Cameroonian club TKC in 2004. In October 2006, she was registered as a player for Equatorial Guinean club Las Vegas.

=== International career ===
Essiane was going to play for the Cameroon national team at the 2004 African Women's Championship, but she missed it due to a tear in her left thigh. Two years later, she was naturalized by Equatorial Guinea to play for that country national team.

==== International goals ====
Scores and results list Equatorial Guinea's goal tally first

No.	Date	Venue	Opponent	Score	Result	Competition
1	28 October 2006	Warri Stadium, Warri, Nigeria	Nigeria	2–2	2–4	2006 African Women's Championship
2	3 November 2006	Oghara Township Stadium, Oghara, Nigeria	Algeria	2–2	3–3	2006 African Women's Championship
3	3 November 2006	Oghara Township Stadium, Oghara, Nigeria	Algeria	3–3	3–3	2006 African Women's Championship
4	11 March 2007	Caledonian Stadium, Pretoria, South Africa	South Africa	1–1	2–4	2008 CAF Women's Pre-Olympic Tournament
5	11 March 2007	Caledonian Stadium, Pretoria, South Africa	South Africa	2–2	2–4	2008 CAF Women's Pre-Olympic Tournament
