= 2008 African Women's Championship =

8th edition of WAFCON

Copa Africana de Naciones femenina 2008 Coupe d'Afrique des Nations féminine 2008 Copa das Nações Africanas feminina 2008

Tournament details
- Host country: Equatorial Guinea
- Dates: 15 – 29 November
- Teams: 8
- Venues: 2 (in 2 host cities)

Final positions
- Champions: Equatorial Guinea (1st title)
- Runners-up: South Africa
- Third place: Nigeria
- Fourth place: Cameroon

Tournament statistics
- Matches played: 16
- Goals scored: 37 (2.31 per match)
- Top scorer: (Equatorial Guinea) Genoveva Añonman (6 goals)

The 2008 African Women's Championship was the 8th edition of the biennial African women's association football tournament organized by the Confederation of African Football between 15 and 29 November 2008. The tournament was held in and won by Equatorial Guinea, being the first tournament not won by Nigeria

== Qualification ==
Qualified teams

- Equatorial Guinea (hosts)
- Ghana
- Cameroon
- Congo (debut)
- Mali
- Nigeria
- South Africa
- Tunisia (debut)

== Group stage ==
=== Tiebreakers ===
If two or more teams in the group stage are tied on points tie-breakers are in order:

1. greater number of points in matches between tied teams
2. superior goal difference in matches between tied teams
3. greater number of goals scored in matches between tied teams
4. superior goal difference in all group matches
5. greater number of goals scored in all group matches
6. fair play criteria based on red and yellow cards received
7. drawing of lots

=== Group A ===
Pos	Team	Pld	W	D	L	GF	GA	GD	Pts	Qualification
1	Equatorial Guinea (H)	3	3	0	0	8	3	+5	9	Advance to knockout stage
2	Cameroon	3	2	0	1	3	2	+1	6	Advance to knockout stage
3	Congo	3	1	0	2	3	6	−3	3	
4	Mali	3	0	0	3	2	5	−3	0	

Rules for classification: Group stage tiebreakers
(H) Hosts
15 November 2008
15:00

Equatorial Guinea	1–0	Cameroon
Añonman 16' (pen.)

Estadio Internacional, Malabo
15 November 2008
17:30

Mali	0–1	Congo
		69' A.P. N'Diaye

Estadio Internacional, Malabo

18 November 2008
15:00

Cameroon	2–1	Mali
M.Bekombo 38'; Ngo Ndoumbouk 90+3'		75' (pen.) Doumbia

Estadio Internacional, Malabo
18 November 2008
17:30

Equatorial Guinea	5–2	Congo
S. Simporé 1'; Chinasa 9'; A. Amarachi 46'; Añonma 65' 90' (pen.)		5' A.P. N'Diaye; 14' D. Mabonzo

Estadio Internacional, Malabo

21 November 2008
15:00

Equatorial Guinea	2–1	Mali
Chinasa 18'; Añonman 88'		K. Diarra 30'

Estadio Internacional, Malabo
21 November 2008
15:00

Cameroon	1–0	Congo
Ngono Mani 45'

Estadio La Libertad, Bata

=== Group B ===
Pos	Team	Pld	W	D	L	GF	GA	GD	Pts	Qualification
1	South Africa	3	2	0	1	3	2	+1	6	Advance to knockout stage
2	Nigeria	3	1	2	0	2	1	+1	5	Advance to knockout stage
3	Ghana	3	1	1	1	4	4	0	4	
4	Tunisia	3	0	1	2	3	5	−2	1	

Rules for classification: Group stage tiebreakers
16 November 2008
13:00

Nigeria	1–1	Ghana
Chiejine 90'		32' Okoe

Estadio La Libertad, Bata
16 November 2008
15:30

South Africa	2–1	Tunisia
Matlou; H. Ngwane		Guedri

Estadio La Libertad, Bata

19 November 2008
13:00

Ghana	0–1	South Africa
		24' V. Phewa

Estadio La Libertad, Bata
19 November 2008
15:30

Tunisia	0–0	Nigeria

Estadio La Libertad, Bata

22 November 2008
15:00

Nigeria	1–0	South Africa
Chiejine 16'

Estadio La Libertad, Bata
22 November 2008
15:00

Ghana	3–2	Tunisia
Ibrahim 45+1'; Abdul-Rahman 51' 82'		4' Mamay; 48' Abidi

Estadio Internacional, Malabo

== Knockout stage ==
=== Bracket ===
Semi-finals
25 November - Malabo
Equatorial Guinea	1
Nigeria	0
25 November - Malabo
South Africa	3
Cameroon	0

Final
28 November - Malabo
Equatorial Guinea	2
South Africa	1
Third place play-off
29 November - Malabo
Nigeria (p)	1 (4)
Cameroon	1 (3)

=== Semi-finals ===
25 November 2008
14:00

Equatorial Guinea	1–0	Nigeria
Añonman 58'

Estadio Internacional, Malabo
25 November 2008
17:00

South Africa	3–0	Cameroon
Matlou 28' 47' 80'

Estadio Internacional, Malabo

=== Third place play-off ===
28 November 2008
15:00

Nigeria	1–1	Cameroon
Eke 28'		64' Onguéné
Penalties
Eke (penalty missed); Ekpo (penalty scored); Chiejine (penalty scored); George (penalty scored); Nkwocha (penalty scored)	4–3	(penalty scored) Ngo Ndoumbouk; (penalty scored) Manie; (penalty missed) Bella; (penalty scored) Onguéné; (penalty missed) S. Mbida

Estadio Internacional, Malabo

=== Final ===
29 November 2008
15:00

Equatorial Guinea	2–1	South Africa
Diala 22'; Añonman 68'		Matlou 35'

Estadio Internacional, Malabo

== Awards ==
2008 African Women's Championship winners

Equatorial Guinea
First/Inaugural title

== Statistics ==
=== Goalscorers ===
There were 37 goals scored in 16 matches, for an average of 2.31 goals per match.

6 goals

- (Equatorial Guinea) Genoveva Añonman

5 goals

- (South Africa) Noko Matlou

2 goals

- (Republic of the Congo) Aminata Passou N'Diaye
- (Equatorial Guinea) Gloria Chinasa
- (Ghana) Safia Abdul Rahman
- (Nigeria) Ifeanyi Chiejine

1 goal

- (Cameroon) Manuella Bekombo
- (Cameroon) Marlyse Ngo Ndoumbouk
- (Cameroon) Madeleine Ngono Mani
- (Cameroon) Gabrielle Onguéné
- (Republic of the Congo) Dedina Mabonzo
- (Equatorial Guinea) Anita Amarachi
- (Equatorial Guinea) Blessing Diala
- (Equatorial Guinea) Salimata Simporé
- (Ghana) Faiza Ibrahim
- (Ghana) Florence Okoe
- (Mali) Korotoumou Diarra
- (Mali) Fatoumata Doumbia
- (Nigeria) Maureen Eke
- (South Africa) Hlengiwe Ngwane
- (South Africa) Veronica Phewa
- (Tunisia) Nassima Abidi
- (Tunisia) Haifa Guedri
- (Tunisia) Sabrine Mamay
