= Ade Ntima =

DR Congolese footballer

Personal information
- Full name: Ade Ntima Kiaku
- Position: Forward

Senior career*
Years	Team	Apps	(Gls)
- Marths
- Expresso

International career^{‡}
2006	DR Congo	1+	(0+)
- * Club domestic league appearances and goals ‡ National team caps and goals as of 1 November 2006.

Ade Ntima Kiaku, known as Ade Ntima, is a DR Congolese footballer who plays as a forward. She has been a member of the DR Congo women's national team.

== Club career ==
Ntima has played for Marths and Expresso in Angola.

== International career ==
Ntima capped for the DR Congo at senior level during the 2006 African Women's Championship.

== See also ==
- List of Democratic Republic of the Congo women's international footballers
