= Ndah =

Ndah is an African surname. Notable people with the surname include:

- George Ndah (born 1974), Nigerian football player
- Olisa Ndah (born 1998), Nigerian football player
- Tempa Ndah (born 1973), Beninese football referee
