= Football at the 2012 Summer Olympics – Women's tournament =

2012 Women's Olympic Football Tournament

Tournament details
- Host country: United Kingdom
- Dates: 25 July – 9 August
- Teams: 12 (from 6 confederations)
- Venues: 6 (in 6 host cities)

Final positions
- Champions: United States (4th title)
- Runners-up: Japan
- Third place: Canada
- Fourth place: France

Tournament statistics
- Matches played: 26
- Goals scored: 71 (2.73 per match)
- Attendance: 660,986 (25,423 per match)
- Top scorer: (Canada) Christine Sinclair (6 goals)
- Fair play award: United States

The women's football tournament at the 2012 Summer Olympics was held in London and five other cities in the United Kingdom from 25 July to 9 August. Associations affiliated with FIFA were invited to enter their women's teams in regional qualifying competitions, from which 11 teams, plus the hosts Great Britain reached the final tournament. There are no age restrictions for the players participating in the tournament. It is the first major FIFA affiliated women's tournament to be staged within the United Kingdom, and marked the first time a team representing Great Britain took part in the women's tournament.

== Qualifying ==
Each National Olympic Committee may enter one women's team in the football tournament.

Means of qualification	Date of completion	Venue^{1}	Berths	Qualified
Host nation	2005	none	1	Great Britain
AFC Preliminary Competition	11 September 2011	China	2	Japan; North Korea
CAF Preliminary Competition	22 October 2011	multiple	2	Cameroon; South Africa
CONCACAF Preliminary Competition	29 January 2012	Canada	2	United States; Canada
CONMEBOL Preliminary Competition	21 November 2010	Ecuador	2	Brazil; Colombia
OFC Preliminary Competition	4 April 2012	multiple	1	New Zealand
Best UEFA teams in 2011 FIFA Women's World Cup	17 July 2011	Germany	2	Sweden; France
TOTAL			12	

- ^1Locations are those of final tournaments, various qualification stages may precede matches at these specific venues.

== Venues ==
The tournament was held in six venues across six cities:

- Millennium Stadium, Cardiff
- City of Coventry Stadium, Coventry
- Hampden Park, Glasgow
- Wembley Stadium, London
- Old Trafford, Manchester
- St James' Park, Newcastle

== Draw ==
The draw for the tournament took place on 24 April 2012. Great Britain, Japan and the United States were seeded for the draw and placed into groups E–G, respectively. The remaining teams were drawn from four pots.

Pot 1	Pot 2	Pot 3	Pot 4
Great Britain (assigned to E1); Sweden; France	Cameroon; South Africa; Colombia	Japan (assigned to F1); North Korea; New Zealand	United States (assigned to G1); Canada; Brazil

== Squads ==
The women's tournament is a full international tournament with no restrictions on age. Each nation must submit a squad of 18 players.

== Match officials ==
On 19 April 2012, FIFA released the list of match referees that would officiate at the Olympics.

Match officials
Confederation	Referee	Assistant referees
AFC	Hong Eun-ah (South Korea)	Sarah Ho (Australia); Kim Kyoung-min (South Korea)
AFC	Sachiko Yamagishi (Japan)	Widiya Habibah Shamsuri (Malaysia); Saori Takahashi (Japan)
CAF	Thérèse Neguel (Cameroon)	Tempa Ndah (Benin); Lidwine Rakotozafinoro (Madagascar)
CONCACAF	Quetzalli Alvarado (Mexico)	Mayte Chávez (Mexico); Shirley Perelló (Honduras)
CONCACAF	Carol Anne Chenard (Canada)	Marie-Josée Charbonneau (Canada); Stacy-Ann Greyson (Jamaica)
CONCACAF	Kari Seitz (United States)	Marlene Duffy (United States); Veronica Perez (United States)
CONMEBOL	Salomé di Iorio (Argentina)	Mariana Corbo (Uruguay); María Rocco (Argentina)
UEFA	Kirsi Heikkinen (Finland)	Anu Jokela (Finland); Tonja Paavola (Finland)
UEFA	Thalia Mitsi (Greece)	Yolanda Parga Rodríguez (Spain); María Luisa Villa Gutiérrez (Spain)
UEFA	Jenny Palmqvist (Sweden)	Helen Caro (Sweden); Anna Nyström (Sweden)
UEFA	Christina Pedersen (Norway)	Lada Rojc (Croatia); Hege Lanes Steinlund (Norway)
UEFA	Bibiana Steinhaus (Germany)	Katrin Rafalski (Germany); Marina Wozniak (Germany)

== Group stage ==
Group winners and runners-up and the two best third-ranked teams advanced to the quarter-finals (also see Tie breakers).

All times are British Summer Time (UTC+1).

=== Group E ===
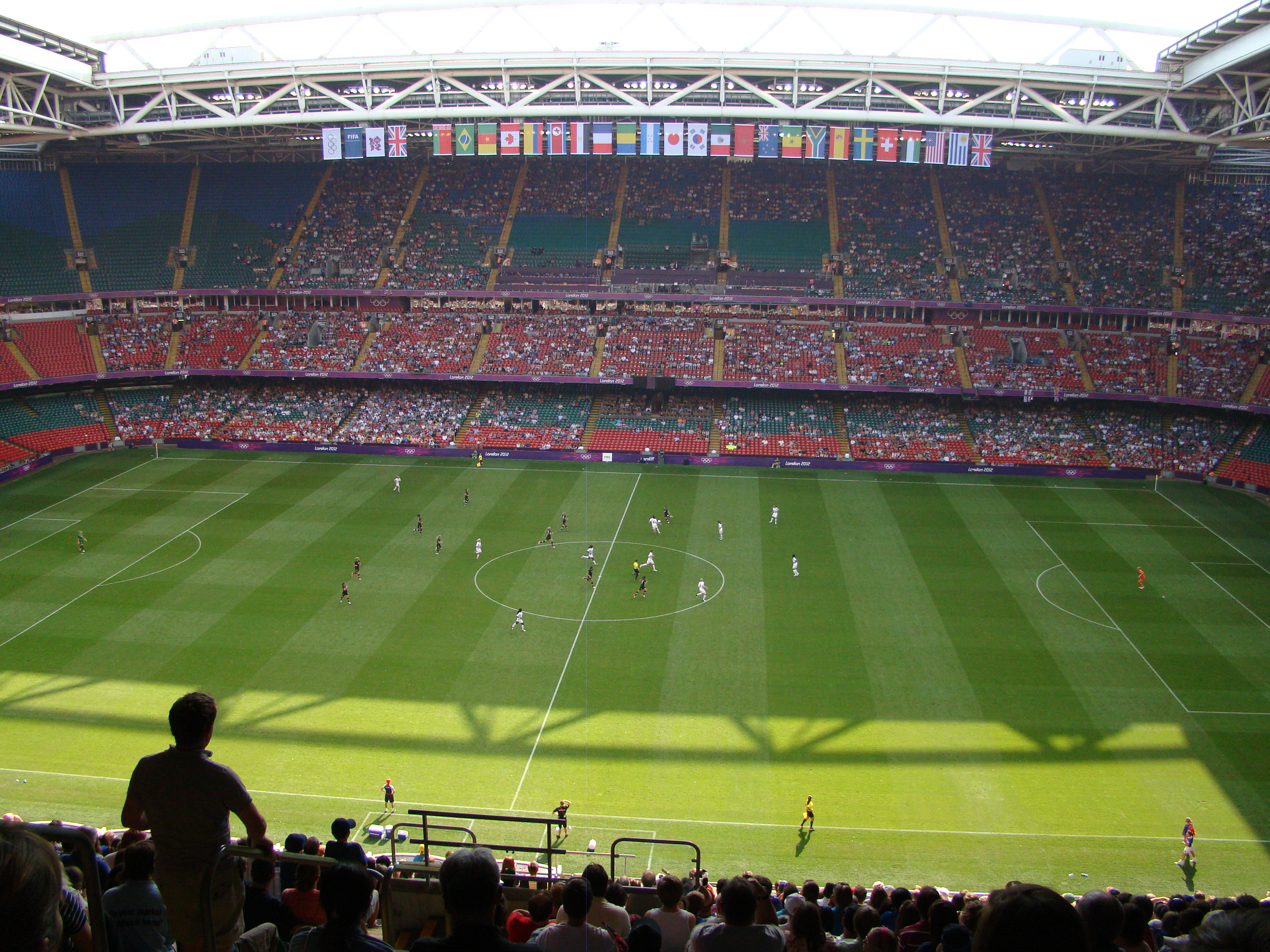
Great Britain vs New Zealand

Pos	Team	Pld	W	D	L	GF	GA	GD	Pts	Qualification
1	Great Britain	3	3	0	0	5	0	+5	9	Qualified for the quarter-finals
2	Brazil	3	2	0	1	6	1	+5	6	Qualified for the quarter-finals
3	New Zealand	3	1	0	2	3	3	0	3	Qualified for the quarter-finals
4	Cameroon	3	0	0	3	1	11	−10	0	

Source: IOC
25 July 2012
16:00

Great Britain	1–0	New Zealand
Houghton 64'	Report

Millennium Stadium, Cardiff
Attendance: 24,445
Referee: Kari Seitz (United States)
25 July 2012
18:45

Cameroon	0–5	Brazil
	Report	Francielle 7'; Costa 10'; Marta 73' (pen.), 88'; Cristiane 78'

Millennium Stadium, Cardiff
Attendance: 30,847
Referee: Jenny Palmqvist (Sweden)

28 July 2012
14:30

New Zealand	0–1	Brazil
	Report	Cristiane 86'

Millennium Stadium, Cardiff
Attendance: 30,103
Referee: Bibiana Steinhaus (Germany)
28 July 2012
17:15

Great Britain	3–0	Cameroon
Stoney 18'; J. Scott 23'; Houghton 82'	Report

Millennium Stadium, Cardiff
Attendance: 31,141
Referee: Hong Eun-ah (South Korea)

31 July 2012
19:45

New Zealand	3–1	Cameroon
Smith 43'; Sonkeng 49' (o.g.); Gregorius 62'	Report	Onguéné 75'

City of Coventry Stadium, Coventry
Attendance: 11,425
Referee: Christina Pedersen (Norway)
31 July 2012
19:45

Great Britain	1–0	Brazil
Houghton 2'	Report

Wembley Stadium, London
Attendance: 70,584
Referee: Carol Anne Chenard (Canada)

=== Group F ===
Pos	Team	Pld	W	D	L	GF	GA	GD	Pts	Qualification
1	Sweden	3	1	2	0	6	3	+3	5	Qualified for the quarter-finals
2	Japan	3	1	2	0	2	1	+1	5	Qualified for the quarter-finals
3	Canada	3	1	1	1	6	4	+2	4	Qualified for the quarter-finals
4	South Africa	3	0	1	2	1	7	−6	1	

Source: IOC
25 July 2012
17:00

Japan	2–1	Canada
Kawasumi 33'; Miyama 44'	Report	Tancredi 55'

City of Coventry Stadium, Coventry
Attendance: 14,119
Referee: Kirsi Heikkinen (Finland)
25 July 2012
19:45

Sweden	4–1	South Africa
Fischer 7'; Dahlkvist 20'; Schelin 21', 63'	Report; Report	Modise 60'

City of Coventry Stadium, Coventry
Attendance: 18,290
Referee: Salomé di Iorio (Argentina)

28 July 2012
12:00

Japan	0–0	Sweden
	Report; Report

City of Coventry Stadium, Coventry
Attendance: 14,160
Referee: Quetzalli Alvarado (Mexico)
28 July 2012
14:45

Canada	3–0	South Africa
Tancredi 7'; Sinclair 58', 86'	Report

City of Coventry Stadium, Coventry
Attendance: 14,753
Referee: Christina Pedersen (Norway)

31 July 2012
14:30

Japan	0–0	South Africa
	Report

Millennium Stadium, Cardiff
Attendance: 24,202
Referee: Efthalia Mitsi (Greece)
31 July 2012
14:30

Canada	2–2	Sweden
Tancredi 43', 84'	Report; Report	Hammarström 14'; Jakobsson 16'

St James' Park, Newcastle
Attendance: 12,719
Referee: Hong Eun-ah (South Korea)

=== Group G ===
Pos	Team	Pld	W	D	L	GF	GA	GD	Pts	Qualification
1	United States	3	3	0	0	8	2	+6	9	Qualified for the quarter-finals
2	France	3	2	0	1	8	4	+4	6	Qualified for the quarter-finals
3	North Korea	3	1	0	2	2	6	−4	3	
4	Colombia	3	0	0	3	0	6	−6	0	

Source: IOC
25 July 2012
17:00

United States	4–2	France
Wambach 19'; Morgan 32', 66'; Lloyd 56'	Report	Thiney 12'; Delie 14'

Hampden Park, Glasgow
Attendance: 18,090
Referee: Sachiko Yamagishi (Japan)
25 July 2012
20:50 †

Colombia	0–2	North Korea
	Report	Kim Song-hui 39', 85'

Hampden Park, Glasgow
Attendance: 18,900
Referee: Carol Anne Chenard (Canada)

28 July 2012
17:00

United States	3–0	Colombia
Rapinoe 33'; Wambach 74'; Lloyd 77'	Report

Hampden Park, Glasgow
Attendance: 11,313
Referee: Efthalia Mitsi (Greece)
28 July 2012
19:45

France	5–0	North Korea
Georges 45'; Thomis 70'; Delie 71'; Renard 81'; Catala 87'	Report

Hampden Park, Glasgow
Attendance: 11,743
Referee: Thérèse Neguel (Cameroon)

31 July 2012
17:15

United States	1–0	North Korea
Wambach 25'	Report

Old Trafford, Manchester
Attendance: 29,522
Referee: Jenny Palmqvist (Sweden)
31 July 2012
17:15

France	1–0	Colombia
Thomis 5'	Report

St James' Park, Newcastle
Attendance: 13,184
Referee: Quetzalli Alvarado (Mexico)

† Game delayed by one hour, having been originally scheduled at 19:45, due to North Korean protest after accidental use of South Korean flag for North Korea.

=== Ranking of third-placed teams ===
Team	Pld	W	D	L	GF	GA	GD	Pts
Canada	3	1	1	1	6	4	+2	4
New Zealand	3	1	0	2	3	3	0	3
North Korea	3	1	0	2	2	6	−4	3

Source: IOC

Green indicates qualified for the quarter-finals

== Knockout stage ==
Quarter-finals
E1	Great Britain	0
F3	Canada	2
G1	United States	2
E3	New Zealand	0
F1	Sweden	1
G2	France	2
E2	Brazil	0
F2	Japan	2

Semi-finals
F3	Canada	3
G1	United States (a.e.t.)	4
G2	France	1
F2	Japan	2

Gold medal match
G1	United States	2
F2	Japan	1
Bronze medal match
F3	Canada	1
G2	France	0

=== Quarter-finals ===
3 August 2012
12:00

Sweden	1–2	France
Fischer 18'	Report; Report	Georges 29'; Renard 39'

Hampden Park, Glasgow
Attendance: 12,869
Referee: Kari Seitz (United States)

3 August 2012
14:30

United States	2–0	New Zealand
Wambach 27'; Leroux 87'	Report

St James' Park, Newcastle
Attendance: 10,441
Referee: Salomé di Iorio (Argentina)

3 August 2012
17:00

Brazil	0–2	Japan
	Report	Ōgimi 27'; Ohno 73'

Millennium Stadium, Cardiff
Attendance: 28,528
Referee: Kirsi Heikkinen (Finland)

3 August 2012
19:30

Great Britain	0–2	Canada
	Report	Filigno 12'; Sinclair 26'

City of Coventry Stadium, Coventry
Attendance: 28,828
Referee: Sachiko Yamagishi (Japan)

=== Semi-finals ===
6 August 2012
17:00

France	1–2	Japan
Le Sommer 76'	Report	Ōgimi 32'; Sakaguchi 49'

Wembley Stadium, London
Attendance: 61,482
Referee: Quetzalli Alvarado (Mexico)

6 August 2012
19:45

Canada	3–4 (a.e.t.)	United States
Sinclair 22', 67', 73'	Report	Rapinoe 54', 70'; Wambach 80' (pen.); Morgan 120+3'

Old Trafford, Manchester
Attendance: 26,630
Referee: Christina Pedersen (Norway)

=== Bronze medal match ===
9 August 2012
13:00

(bronze) Canada	1–0	France
Matheson 90+2'	Report

City of Coventry Stadium, Coventry
Attendance: 12,465
Referee: Jenny Palmqvist (Sweden)

=== Gold medal match ===
9 August 2012
19:45

(gold) United States	2–1	Japan (silver)
Lloyd 8', 54'	Report	Ōgimi 63'

Wembley Stadium, London
Attendance: 80,203
Referee: Bibiana Steinhaus (Germany)

== Statistics ==
=== Goalscorers ===
There were 71 goals scored in 26 matches, for an average of 2.73 goals per match.

6 goals

- (Canada) Christine Sinclair

5 goals

- (United States) Abby Wambach

4 goals

- (Canada) Melissa Tancredi
- (United States) Carli Lloyd

3 goals

- (United Kingdom) Steph Houghton
- (Japan) Yūki Ōgimi
- (United States) Alex Morgan
- (United States) Megan Rapinoe

2 goals

- (Brazil) Cristiane
- (Brazil) Marta
- (France) Marie-Laure Delie
- (France) Laura Georges
- (France) Wendie Renard
- (France) Élodie Thomis
- (North Korea) Kim Song-hui
- (Sweden) Nilla Fischer
- (Sweden) Lotta Schelin

1 goal

- (Brazil) Francielle
- (Brazil) Renata Costa
- (Cameroon) Gabrielle Onguéné
- (Canada) Jonelle Filigno
- (Canada) Diana Matheson
- (France) Camille Catala
- (France) Eugénie Le Sommer
- (France) Gaëtane Thiney
- (United Kingdom) Jill Scott
- (United Kingdom) Casey Stoney
- (Japan) Nahomi Kawasumi
- (Japan) Aya Miyama
- (Japan) Shinobu Ohno
- (Japan) Mizuho Sakaguchi
- (New Zealand) Sarah Gregorius
- (New Zealand) Rebecca Smith
- (South Africa) Portia Modise
- (Sweden) Lisa Dahlkvist
- (Sweden) Marie Hammarström
- (Sweden) Sofia Jakobsson
- (United States) Sydney Leroux

1 own goal

- (Cameroon) Ysis Sonkeng (against New Zealand)

Source: FIFA

=== Assists ===
5 assists

- (United States) Alex Morgan

4 assists

- (France) Louisa Nécib

3 assists

- (Canada) Sophie Schmidt
- (France) Élodie Thomis
- (United States) Megan Rapinoe

2 assists

- (Canada) Melissa Tancredi
- (Canada) Rhian Wilkinson
- (United Kingdom) Karen Carney
- (United Kingdom) Kim Little
- (Japan) Shinobu Ohno
- (Sweden) Marie Hammarström
- (United States) Tobin Heath

1 assist

- (Brazil) Cristiane
- (Brazil) Francielle
- (Cameroon) Adrienne Iven
- (Canada) Diana Matheson
- (Canada) Lauren Sesselmann
- (Canada) Christine Sinclair
- (France) Sonia Bompastor
- (Japan) Aya Miyama
- (Japan) Aya Sameshima
- (Japan) Homare Sawa
- (New Zealand) Ria Percival
- (New Zealand) Rosie White
- (Sweden) Sofia Jakobsson
- (Sweden) Lina Nilsson
- (Sweden) Caroline Seger
- (Sweden) Sara Thunebro
- (United States) Kelley O'Hara
- (United States) Heather O'Reilly
- (United States) Christie Rampone
- (United States) Hope Solo

Source: FIFA

=== Discipline ===
Red cards

- (North Korea) Choe Mi-gyong

Match bans

- (Colombia) Lady Andrade was banned two matches for violent conduct in punching Abby Wambach.

=== FIFA Fair Play Award ===
The United States won the FIFA Fair Play Award, given to the team with the best record of fair play during the tournament. Every match in the final competition is taken into account but only teams that reach the second stage of the competition are eligible for the Fair Play Award.

Pos	Team	Pts
1	United States	945
2	Sweden	890
3	France	875
4	Japan	874
5	Canada	863
6	New Zealand	844
7	Great Britain	798
8	Brazil	698

=== Tournament ranking ===
Per statistical convention in football, matches decided in extra time are counted as wins and losses, while matches decided by penalty shoot-outs are counted as draws.

Pos	Grp	Team	Pld	W	D	L	GF	GA	GD	Pts	Final result
1	G	United States	6	6	0	0	16	6	+10	18	Gold medal
2	F	Japan	6	3	2	1	7	4	+3	11	Silver medal
3	F	Canada	6	3	1	2	12	8	+4	10	Bronze medal
4	G	France	6	3	0	3	11	8	+3	9	Fourth place
5	E	Great Britain (H)	4	3	0	1	5	2	+3	9	Eliminated in quarter-finals
6	E	Brazil	4	2	0	2	6	3	+3	6	Eliminated in quarter-finals
7	F	Sweden	4	1	2	1	7	5	+2	5	Eliminated in quarter-finals
8	E	New Zealand	4	1	0	3	3	5	−2	3	Eliminated in quarter-finals
9	G	North Korea	3	1	0	2	2	6	−4	3	Eliminated in group stage
10	F	South Africa	3	0	1	2	1	7	−6	1	Eliminated in group stage
11	G	Colombia	3	0	0	3	0	6	−6	0	Eliminated in group stage
12	E	Cameroon	3	0	0	3	1	11	−10	0	Eliminated in group stage

Source: FIFA
(H) Hosts

== Notable events and controversies ==
=== North Korea flag confusion ===
In the first day of the Olympic events on 25 July, the match between DPR Korea and Colombia was delayed by a little over an hour because the flag of South Korea was mistakenly displayed on the electronic scoreboard in Hampden Park. The North Korean team walked off the pitch in protest at seeing the South Korean flag displayed by their names and refused to warm-up whilst the flag was being displayed. They also objected to the South Korean flag being displayed above the stadium, even though the flags of all the competing countries were being displayed. The game then commenced after a delay and rectification of the error.

Andy Mitchell, venue media manager for the London Organising Committee of the Olympic and Paralympic Games (LOCOG), read out a LOCOG statement shortly afterwards:

"Today ahead of the Women’s football match at Hampden Park, the South Korean flag was shown on a big screen video package instead of the North Korean flag. Clearly that is a mistake, we will apologise to the team and the National Olympic Committee and steps will be taken to ensure this does not happen again".

LOCOG's statement had to be reissued because it failed to use the nations' official titles, "Republic of Korea" and "Democratic People's Republic of Korea".

British Prime Minister David Cameron added that it was an "honest mistake" and efforts would be undertaken to ensure such a mishap does not recur. However, North Korean manager Sin Ui-gun expressed reservations about whether the incident was a mistake of intention and said: "We were angry because our players were introduced as if they were from South Korea, which may affect us greatly as you may know. Our team was not going to participate unless the problem was solved perfectly and fortunately some time later, the broadcasting was corrected and shown again live so we made up our mind to participate and go on with the match. If this matter cannot be solved, we thought going on was nonsense. Winning the game cannot compensate for that thing".

=== Canada–United States semi-final ===
During the semi-final match between Canada and the United States, a time-wasting call was made against the Canadian goalkeeper, Erin McLeod, when she held the ball longer than the allowed six seconds. As a result, the American side was awarded an indirect free-kick in the box. On the ensuing play, Canada was penalized for a handball in the penalty box, with the American team being awarded a penalty kick, which Abby Wambach converted to tie the game at 3–3. The Americans went on to win the match in extra time, advancing to the gold medal game. After the match, Canada forward Christine Sinclair stated, "the ref decided the result before the game started." FIFA responded by stating that the refereeing decisions were correct and saying it was considering disciplinary action against Sinclair, but that any disciplinary action would be postponed until after the end of the tournament.

== See also ==
- Football at the 2012 Summer Olympics – Men's tournament
