= Gisèle Bosimba =

DR Congolese footballer

Personal information
- Full name: Gisèle Bosimba Eedja
- Date of birth: 10 April 1988 (age 38)
- Position: Defender

Senior career*
| Years | Team | Apps | (Gls) |
- Grand Hotel

International career
- DR Congo
- * Club domestic league appearances and goals

Gisèle Bosimba Eedja (born 10 April 1988), known as Gisèle Bosimba, is a DR Congolese footballer who plays as a defender. She has been a member of the DR Congo women's national team.

== See also ==
- List of Democratic Republic of the Congo women's international footballers
