= Youyou Kisita =

DR Congolese footballer

Personal information
- Full name: Youyou Kisita Milandu

Senior career*
Years	Team	Apps	(Gls)
- Progresso

International career^{‡}
2006	DR Congo	3+	(1+)
- * Club domestic league appearances and goals ‡ National team caps and goals as of 1 November 2006.

Youyou Kisita Milandu, known as Youyou Kisita, is a DR Congolese footballer. She has been a member of the DR Congo women's national team.

== Club career ==
Kisita has played for Progresso in Angola.

== International career ==
Kisita capped for the DR Congo at senior level during the 2006 African Women's Championship.

=== International goals ===
Scores and results list DR Congo's goal tally first

No.	Date	Venue	Opponent	Score	Result	Competition	Ref.
1	29 October 2006	Ughelli Township Stadium, Ughelli, Nigeria	Cameroon	1–1	1–1	2006 African Women's Championship	

== See also ==
- List of Democratic Republic of the Congo women's international footballers
