= Stéphanie Mbole =

DR Congolese footballer

Personal information
- Full name: Stéphanie Mbole Mika
- Date of birth: 10 October 1990 (age 36)
- Position: Goalkeeper

Senior career*
Years	Team	Apps	(Gls)
- Progresso
- Force Terrestre

International career
- DR Congo
- * Club domestic league appearances and goals

Stéphanie Mbole Mika (born 10 October 1990), known as Stéphanie Mbole, is a DR Congolese footballer who plays as a goalkeeper. She has been a member of the DR Congo women's national team.

== International career ==
Mbole capped for the DR Congo at senior level during the 2012 African Women's Championship.

== See also ==
- List of Democratic Republic of the Congo women's international footballers
