= Ma Xiaoxu =

Chinese footballer (born 1988)

Ma Xiaoxu 马晓旭
Personal information
- Full name: Ma Xiaoxu
- Date of birth: 5 June 1988 (age 38)
- Place of birth: Dalian, Liaoning, China
- Height: 1.72 m (5 ft 8 in)
- Position: Striker

Senior career*
Years	Team	Apps	(Gls)
2003–2006	Dalian Shide		
2007	Umeå IK		
2007–2018	Dalian Quanjian		
2019–2022	Beijing BG Phoenix		(5)

International career^{‡}
2005–2006	China Women U-20	8	(5)
2005–2016	China Women	152	(61)

Managerial career
- 2022–2025: Beijing Women (assistant)
- 2026–: China Women U-17
- 2026–: China Women (assistant)
Medal record
Women's football
Representing China
AFC U-19 Women's Championship
Gold medal – first place	2006 Malaysia	Team
AFC Women's Asian Cup
Gold medal – first place	2006 Australia	Team
FIFA U-20 Women's World Championship
Silver medal – second place	2006 Russia	Team
Asian Games
Bronze medal – third place	2006 Doha	Team
- * Club domestic league appearances and goals as of 12 August 2016 ‡ National team caps and goals as of 12 August 2016

Ma Xiaoxu (simplified Chinese: 马晓旭; traditional Chinese: 馬曉旭; pinyin: Mǎ Xiǎoxù; born 5 June 1988) is a Chinese football coach and former footballer who has played for Dalian Quanjian and Beijing BG Phoenix of the Chinese Women's Super League. She also spent a short time with Umeå IK of the Swedish Damallsvenskan in 2007.

== Club career ==
=== Umeå ===
In February 2007 Ma agreed an initial six-month contract with Swedish Damallsvenskan champions Umeå IK, on a reported monthly salary of USD 5,000. She made a substitute appearance as Umeå beat Linköpings FC in the Svenska Supercupen, then scored on her league debut as Umeå defeated QBIK 4–0 on the opening match day.

Ma featured in both legs of Umeå's 2007 UEFA Women's Cup Final defeat by Arsenal. The following month Ma and Marta both scored twice in a 5–2 Damallsvenskan win over Kopparbergs/Göteborg FC. Ma struggled with the intensity of the training at Umeå, and was criticised by the coach Andrée Jeglertz for her lack of mobility and poor work-rate. She was released from her Umeå contract early in July 2007, to return to China in preparation for the 2007 FIFA Women's World Cup which they were hosting.

=== Beijing ===
In December 2020 Ma and several other experienced players left Beijing BG Phoenix amid economic downsizing at the club. In 2022, Ma decided to retire and transformed as the assistant coach.

== Coaching career ==
On 4 January 2026, Ma was appointed as the head coach of China women's national under-17 football team.

On 25 May 2026, Ma joined China women's national football team as assistant coach.

== International goals ==
No.	Date	Venue	Opponent	Score	Result	Competition
1.	20 January 2006	Guangdong Olympic Stadium, Guangzhou, China	Norway	3–1	3–1	2006 Four Nations Tournament
2.	21 July 2006	Hindmarsh Stadium, Adelaide, Australia	Vietnam	1–0	2–0	2006 AFC Women's Asian Cup
3.	21 July 2006	Hindmarsh Stadium, Adelaide, Australia	Vietnam	2–0	2–0	2006 AFC Women's Asian Cup
4.	27 July 2006	Hindmarsh Stadium, Adelaide, Australia	North Korea	1–0	1–0	2006 AFC Women's Asian Cup
5.	30 July 2006	Hindmarsh Stadium, Adelaide, Australia	Australia	2–2	2–2 (a.e.t.) (4–2 p)	2006 AFC Women's Asian Cup
6.	4 December 2006	Thani bin Jassim Stadium, Doha, Qatar	Jordan	11–0	12–0	2006 Asian Games
7.	4 December 2006	Thani bin Jassim Stadium, Doha, Qatar	Jordan	12–0	12–0	2006 Asian Games
8.	10 February 2010	Ajinomoto Stadium, Tokyo, Japan	South Korea	1–0	2–1	2010 EAFF Women's Football Championship
9.	17 May 2014	Thống Nhất Stadium, Ho Chi Minh City, Vietnam	Myanmar	2–0	3–0	2014 AFC Women's Asian Cup
10.	23 January 2016	Shenzhen Universiade Sports Centre, Foshan, China	Vietnam	3–0	8–0	2016 Four Nations Tournament
11.	23 January 2016	Shenzhen Universiade Sports Centre, Foshan, China	Vietnam	8–0	8–0	2016 Four Nations Tournament
12.	26 January 2016	Shenzhen Universiade Sports Centre, Foshan, China	South Korea	1–0	2–0	2016 Four Nations Tournament
13.	9 March 2016	Nagai Stadium, Osaka, Japan	Australia	1–0	1–1	2016 AFC Women's Olympic Qualifying Tournament
14.	2 June 2016	Kunshan Stadium, Kunshan, China	Thailand	1–0	6–0	Friendly

== Honours ==
=== Club ===
Umeå IK

- Damallsvenskan: 2007
- Svenska Cupen: 2007
- Svenska Supercupen: 2007

Dalian Quanjian

- Chinese Women's Super League: 2008, 2012, 2013, 2016

=== International ===
China PR national football team

- AFC Women's Asian Cup: 2006
- Four Nations Tournament: 2009, 2014, 2016

China national under-20 football team

- AFC U-19 Women's Championship: 2006

=== Individual ===
- AFC Women's Asian Cup Most Valuable Player: 2006
- FIFA U-20 Women's World Championship Golden Shoe: 2006
- FIFA U-20 Women's World Championship Golden Ball: 2006
- Asian Women's Footballer of the Year: 2006
- Asian Young Footballer of the Year: 2006

== See also ==
- List of women's footballers with 100 or more international caps
