= Mamie Buazo =

DR Congolese footballer

Personal information
- Full name: Mamie Buazo Ngazale
- Date of birth: 24 December 1988 (age 37)
- Height: 1.67 m (5 ft 6 in)
- Position: Goalkeeper

Senior career*
Years	Team	Apps	(Gls)
- Grand Hôtel

International career^{‡}
2006–2008	DR Congo U20	4+	(0+)
2006	DR Congo	3+	(0+)
- * Club domestic league appearances and goals ‡ National team caps and goals as of 27 November 2008.

Mamie Buazo Ngazale was born 24 December 1988 in Kinshasa Democratic Republic of the Congo(DRC).She was a talented goalkeeper in Kinshasa. She was DR Congolese footballer who plays as a goalkeeper. She has been a member of the DR Congo women's national team. She started again passion of sports when she was a child.

== Club career ==
Buazo has played for Grand Hôtel in the Democratic Republic of the Congo.

== National Team Engagement ==
Mamie Buazo's selection for the DR Congo women's national team was a major turning point in her career. Between 2006 and 2008, she played passionately in various international competitions, capitalizing on every opportunity to showcase her talent. Buazo's precise skills and keen positioning allowed her to stand out among her teammates. Her merit was recognized, and she became a key member of the team, proving that Congolese athletes can compete on the world stage of women's football . Her performances in these tournaments made her a respected figure with her football gloves .

== Awards ==
She participated in the FIFA women's world cup qualifiers in 2007 to the final rounds.

Edition	Venue	Date	Match	Stage
2007	Ughelli	04/11/2006	1:3(0:2)	GHA Final rounds
2007	Ogbara	01/11/2006	2:3(1:1)	MLI Final rounds
2007	Ughelli	29/10/2007	1:1(1:0)	COD Final rounds

== International career ==
Buazo was capped for the DR Congo at senior level during the 2006 African Women's Championship.

== See also ==
- List of Democratic Republic of the Congo women's international footballers
