= Jenny Palmqvist =

Swedish football referee

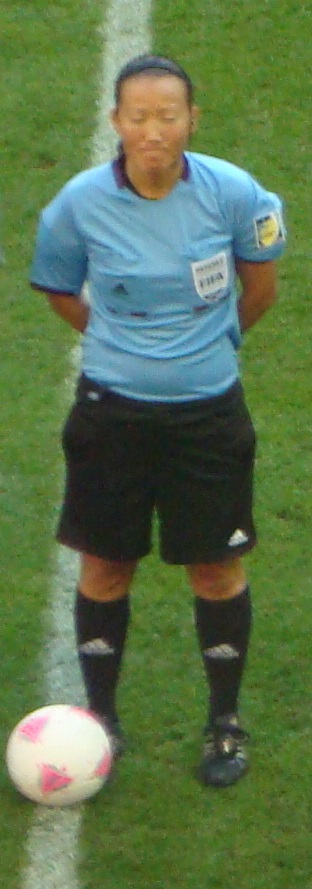
- Palmqvist in July 2012
- Full name: Jenny Palmqvist
- Born: 2 November 1969 (age 56); South Korea
- Other occupation: Sales management

Domestic
- Years: League
- 1999–: Damallsvenskan

International
- Years: League
- 2002–: FIFA

Jenny Palmqvist (born 2 November 1969) is a Swedish association football referee.

== Early life and education ==
Palmqvist was born in South Korea and grew up in Sweden. She is 5 ft 5 in (1.65 m) tall and can speak English, as well as her native Swedish.

== Career ==
Palmqvist has refereed several major women's association football matches at domestic and international level. These include the final of the 2004 Summer Olympics tournament and the 2009 and 2012 UEFA Champions Leagues. She was also the fourth official in the 2011 FIFA Women's World Cup final. In the 2012 Summer Olympics' United States 1–0 North Korea group stage game she showed North Korea's Choe Mi-gyong the only red card in the tournament. She previously signaled the tournament's first penalty in the opening matchday's Brazil 5–0 Cameroon.

=== Major games by tournament ===
==== National teams ====
- 2004 Summer Olympics — The United States 2–1 Brazil final.
- 2006 Asian Cup — The Australia 2–0 Japan semi-final.
- 2006 U–20 World Championship — The China 0–0 United States third place game and the United States 4–1 Germany quarter-finals.
- 2007 World Cup — The United States 3–0 England quarter-finals.
- 2008 Summer Olympics — The United States 2–1 Canada quarter-finals.
- 2009 European Championship — The Germany 2–1 Italy quarter-finals.
- 2011 World Cup — The France 1–1 England quarter-finals, won by France on penalties.
- 2012 Summer Olympics — The Canada 1–0 France bronze medal match.

==== Clubs ====
- 2004 UEFA Women's Cup — The Fulham 1–4 (2–7) Frankfurt quarter-final's 2nd leg.
- 2007 UEFA Women's Cup — The Arsenal 4–1 (9–1) Breiðablik quarter-final's 2nd leg.
- 2008 UEFA Women's Cup — The Arsenal 2–3 (2–3) Lyon quarter-final's 2nd leg.
- 2009 UEFA Women's Cup — The Duisburg 1–1 (7–1) Zvezda Perm final's 2nd leg.
- 2010 UEFA Champions League — The Duisburg 2–1 (4–1) Arsenal quarter-final's 1st leg.
- 2011 UEFA Champions League — The Duisburg 2–1 (5–2) Everton quarter-final's 2nd leg.
- 2012 UEFA Champions League — The Lyon 2–0 Frankfurt final.

== Honours ==
- IFFHS World's Best Woman Referee: 2012
