= Gizi Kiuvu =

DR Congolese footballer

Guyssie Kiuvu
Personal information
- Full name: Gizi Kiuvu Diampasi
- Date of birth: 5 February 1988 (age 38)
- Height: 1.65 m (5 ft 5 in)
- Position: Defender

Senior career*
| Years | Team | Apps | (Gls) |
- Grand Hôtel

International career^{‡}
| 2006–2008 | DR Congo U20 | 6+ | (0+) |
| 2006 | DR Congo | 3+ | (0+) |
- * Club domestic league appearances and goals ‡ National team caps and goals as of 27 November 2008.

Gizi Kiuvu Diampasi (born 5 February 1988), known as Guyssie Kiuvu, is a DR Congolese footballer who plays as a defender. She has been a member of the DR Congo women's national team.

== Club career ==
Kiuvu has played for Grand Hôtel in the Democratic Republic of the Congo.

== International career ==
Kiuvu was capped for the DR Congo at senior level during the 2006 African Women's Championship.

== See also ==
- List of Democratic Republic of the Congo women's international footballers
