= Christine Bongo =

DR Congolese footballer

Personal information
- Full name: Christine Bongo Lumengu
- Date of birth: 24 July 1988 (age 38)
- Height: 1.67 m (5 ft 6 in)
- Position: Midfielder

Senior career*
Years	Team	Apps	(Gls)
- La Colombe Brazzaville
- Force Terrestre

International career^{‡}
2006–2008	DR Congo U20	5+	(0+)
2006	DR Congo	2+	(0+)
- * Club domestic league appearances and goals ‡ National team caps and goals as of 27 November 2008.

Christine Bongo Lumengu (born 24 July 1988), known as Christine Bongo, is a DR Congolese footballer who plays as a midfielder. She has been a member of the DR Congo women's national team.

== Club career ==
Bongo has played for La Colombe Brazzaville in the Republic of the Congo and for Force Terrestre in the Democratic Republic of the Congo.

== Awards ==
She participated in the FIFA women's world cup qualifiers in 2007 to the final stage.

Edition	Venue	Date	Match	Stage
2007	Ughelli	04/11/2006	1:3(1:2)	Final rounds
2007	Ughelli	29/10/2006	1:1(1:0)	Final rounds

== International career ==
Bongo was capped for the DR Congo at senior level during the 2006 African Women's Championship.

== See also ==
- List of Democratic Republic of the Congo women's international footballers
