= Arlette Mafuta =

DR Congolese footballer

Personal information
- Full name: Arlette Mafuta Maluvuidi
- Date of birth: 3 September 1989 (age 37)
- Position: Midfielder

Senior career*
Years	Team	Apps	(Gls)
- Grand Hotel

International career
- DR Congo
- * Club domestic league appearances and goals

Arlette Mafuta Maluvuidi (born 3 September 1989), known as Arlette Mafuta, is a Congolese footballer who plays as a midfielder. She has been a member of the DR Congo women's national team.

== International career ==
Arlette Mafuta plays the 2006 FIFA U-20 Women's World Championship in Russia; she enters at the 79th minute against France and she is on the starting XI against Argentina.

Mafuta capped for the DR Congo at senior level during the 2006 African Women's Championship and the 2012 African Women's Championship,; she scored one goal against South Africa.

== See also ==
- List of Democratic Republic of the Congo women's international footballers
