= Oghara Township Stadium =

Coordinates: 5.9399°N 5.6852°E

Oghara Township Stadium is a multi-use stadium in Oghara, Nigeria. It is currently used mostly for football matches and hosted some of the final tournaments for the 2006 Women's African Football Championship. The stadium has a capacity of 8,000 people. The stadium has served as the temporary homes of Bayelsa teams Ocean Boys F.C. and Bayelsa United F.C..
