= Yuan Fan =

Chinese footballer

Medal record

Women's football

Representing China

Asian Games
Bronze medal – third place	2006 Doha	Team

Yuan Fan (Chinese: 袁帆; pinyin: Yuán Fàn, born November 6, 1986, in Shanghai) is a female Chinese football player who competed for the national team in the 2008 Summer Olympics. Her position is that of defender.

== International goals ==
No.	Date	Venue	Opponent	Score	Result	Competition
1.	10 February 2010	Ajinomoto Stadium, Tokyo, Japan	South Korea	2–0	2–1	2010 EAFF Women's Football Championship
2.	21 May 2010	Shuangliu Sports Centre, Chengdu, China	Vietnam	2–0	5–0	2010 AFC Women's Asian Cup

== Major performances ==
- 2006 U20 World Cup - 2nd;
- 2006 Asian Cup - 1st;
- 2006 Asian Games - 3rd
