= Warri Stadium =

Building in Nigeria

Coordinates: 5°30′42″N 5°45′23″E

Warri Stadium is a multi-purpose stadium in Warri, Nigeria on Cemetery Road. It is currently used mostly for football matches and is the regular home of former Warri Wolves F.C. The stadium hosted the final tournament for the 2006 Women's African Football Championship and has a capacity of 20,000 people, all covered. It was renovated for the 2009 FIFA U-17 World Cup.

International standard track and field facilities were installed in preparation of the 2013 African Youth Athletics Championships. The Timetronics Electronic Distance Measurement system was the first of its kind to be used in the country.
