= Ludmila Manicler =

Argentine footballer and futsal player

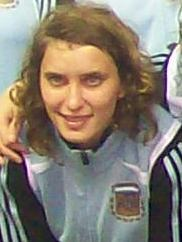

Personal information
- Date of birth: 6 July 1987 (age 39)
- Place of birth: San Pedro, Buenos Aires, Argentina
- Height: 1.63 m (5 ft 4 in)
- Position: Striker

Senior career*
Years	Team	Apps	(Gls)
- Independiente
2008–2011	Santiago Morning		
2011–2012	Barcelona	14	(3)
- Boca Juniors
- River Plate
- Sportivo Barracas
- Sportivo Barracas (futsal)
2019–2020	Boca Juniors		

International career
- Argentina
- * Club domestic league appearances and goals

Ludmila Manicler (born 6 July 1987) is an Argentine footballer and futsal player who plays as a forward. She is a former member of the Argentina women's national team.

She's 163 cm tall and has a weight of 48.40 kg. She previously played for FC Barcelona in Spain's Primera División.

Manicler scored the first Argentine goal in an olympic competition on the 1–2 defeat against Canada at the 2008 Summer Olympics women's tournament. Her first international competition was the 2006 FIFA U-20 Women's World Cup, where she scored 3 goals.

Manicler has also played for Club Atlético Independiente in Argentina and Santiago Morning of Chile's Women 1st Division.
