= Elena Kochneva =

Russian footballer (born 1989)

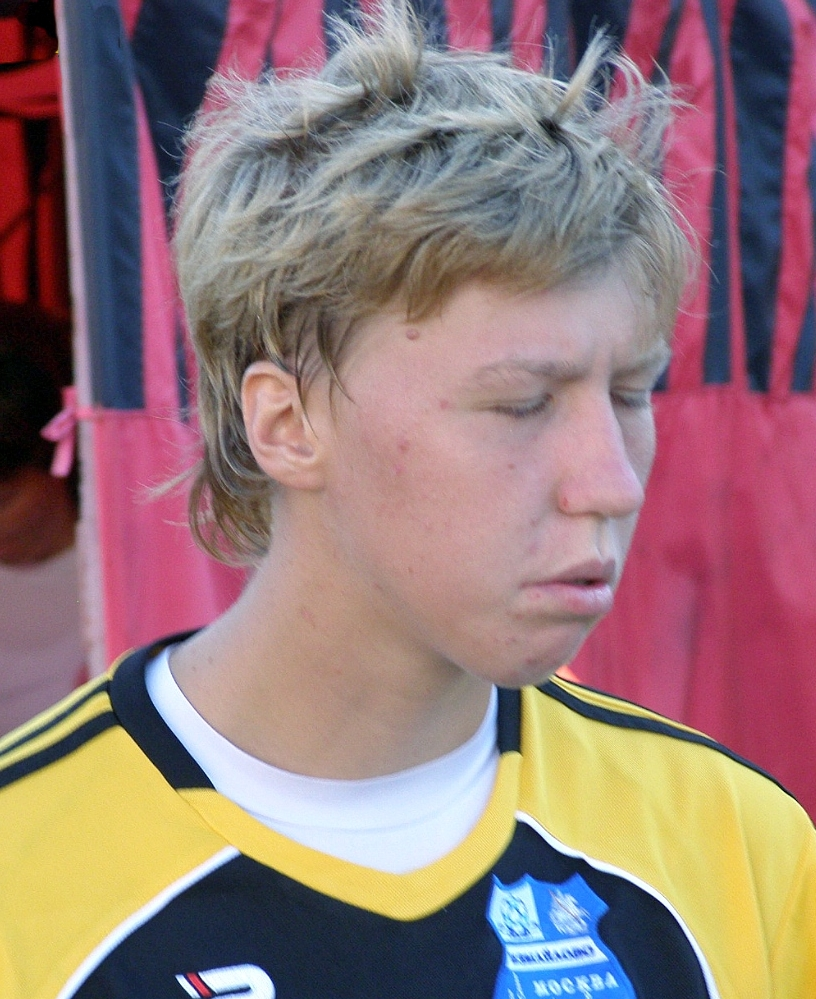

Personal information
- Date of birth: 27 August 1989 (age 37)
- Place of birth: Irkutsk, Soviet Union
- Height: 5 ft 9 in (1.76 m)
- Position: Goalkeeper

Senior career*
Years	Team	Apps	(Gls)
2006—2007	Chertanovo		
2007—2011	SHVSM Izmailovo		

International career
2007—2014	Russia	12	
- * Club domestic league appearances and goals

Elena Vitalyevna Kochneva (Russian: Елена Витальевна Кочнева; born 27 August 1989) is a former Russian footballer who played as a goalkeeper. She was a member of the Russian national team and was part of the Russian squad that participated at UEFA Women's Euro 2009.
