= Zhang Weishuang =

Chinese footballer

Zhang Weishuang is a Chinese footballer.

She competed at the 2006 FIFA U-20 Women's World Championship, winning a silver medal. She scored a goal. She competed at the 2008 FIFA U-20 Women's World Cup, where she scored a goal against the United States.
