= Lydia Neumann =

German footballer

Personal information
- Full name: Lydia Neumann
- Date of birth: 11 November 1986 (age 39)
- Place of birth: Riesa, East Germany
- Height: 1.78 m (5 ft 10 in)
- Position: Striker

Senior career*
Years	Team	Apps	(Gls)
2004–2011	Bad Neuenahr	144	(46)
- * Club domestic league appearances and goals

Lydia Neumann is a German currently unattached football striker. She played for eight years for SC 07 Bad Neuenahr in the Bundesliga.

As an under-19 international she played the 2006 U-20 World Championship.
