= Amanda Poach =

American soccer player

Personal information
- Full name: Amanda Nicole Poach
- Date of birth: July 25, 1987 (age 39)
- Place of birth: Fairfax, Virginia, United States
- Height: 5 ft 6 in (1.68 m)
- Position: Midfielder

Youth career
- 2003–2005: Bethesda Excel

College career
Years	Team	Apps	(Gls)
2005–2009	Santa Clara Broncos		

Amanda Nicole Poach (born July 25, 1987) is an American soccer midfield player from Bowie, Maryland. Poach represented the United States at the 2006 FIFA U-20 Women's World Championship where the team finished in fourth place.
