= Xu Meishuang =

Chinese footballer

Personal information
- Date of birth: 28 May 1986 (age 40)
- Position: Goalkeeper

Senior career*
Years	Team	Apps	(Gls)
- Changchun Yatai

International career^{‡}
	China	3	(0)
- * Club domestic league appearances and goals ‡ National team caps and goals as of 10 September 2007 (before the 2007 FIFA Women's World Cup)

Xu Meishuang (born 28 May 1986) is a Chinese women's international footballer who plays as a goalkeeper. She is a member of the China women's national football team. She was part of the team at the 2007 FIFA Women's World Cup. On club level she plays for Changchun Yatai in China.
