= Emma Humphries (New Zealand footballer) =

New Zealand footballer (born 1986)

Personal information
- Full name: Emma Louise Humphries
- Date of birth: 14 June 1986 (age 40)
- Place of birth: Wellington, New Zealand
- Height: 1.64 m (5 ft 5 in)
- Position: Midfielder

College career
Years	Team	Apps	(Gls)
2004–2005	Cal State Fullerton Titans		
2006–2007	Coastal Carolina Chanticleers	31	(6)

Senior career*
Years	Team	Apps	(Gls)
- Brevard County Cocoa Expos

International career
2005	New Zealand Universiade		
2005	New Zealand U19		
2006	New Zealand U20		
2006–2008	New Zealand	12	(0)

Managerial career
- 2014: Capital Football (women)
- 2018–2021: Liverpool Women (assistant)
- 2021–2024: Canada U17 (women)
- * Club domestic league appearances and goals

Emma Louise Humphries (born 14 June 1986) is a New Zealand football manager and former player who represented her country at international level. She currently serves as the Academy Director of Wellington Phoenix FC.

== College career ==
In 2004, she began attending California State University, Fullerton, where she played for the women's soccer team.

In 2006, she moved to Coastal Carolina University to play for their soccer team. On September 11, 2006, she scored her first goal for the school in a 2-0 victory over the Campbell Fighting Camels.

== Club career ==
While in college, Humphries played club soccer with the Brevard County Cocoa Expos] in the Women's Premier Soccer League.

== International career ==
In 2005, Humphries played for the New Zealand U19 team. In 2006, she played with the New Zealand U20 team at the 2006 FIFA U-20 Women's World Championship, serving as captain. In 2005, she represented the New Zealand Universiade team at the 2005 Summer Universiade.

In May 2004, Humphries debuted with the New Zealand senior team in an unofficial friendly against a Japan Universities team. In August 2007, she was called up to the squad for a pair of friendlies against the United States. She was then named to the roster for the 2007 FIFA Women's World Cup. She earned 12 official caps and 2 unofficial caps with the team over her career.

== Coaching career ==
Humphries began her coaching career in New Zealand, where she worked with New Zealand Football in a Women’s Football Development position for four years and also worked with Capital Football serving as the head coach of their New Zealand Women's National League team in 2014.

In January 2015, she joined the Vancouver Whitecaps Academy as the Girls Elite REX program assistant coach, being promoted to interim head coach in March, before being named Girls Program Director and REX head coach in August 2015.

In 2018, she joined Liverpool Women in the Women's Super League, as an assistant coach.

In September 2021, Humphries was named the Director of Women's Football Development with the Vancouver Whitecaps FC, managing the advancement of women's players and coaches from the Whitecaps FC Girls Elite Academy.

In September 2021, she was also named head coach of the Canada U17 women's team, in addition to her role with the Whitecaps. She also served as an assistant coach with the Canada U20 women's team.

In December 2024, it was announced that she would return to New Zealand to become the Academy Director for Wellington Phoenix FC, beginning in January 2025.

== Personal life ==
Humphries is married to English football manager Bev Priestman.
