= Inès Dhaou =

French association football player (born 1988)

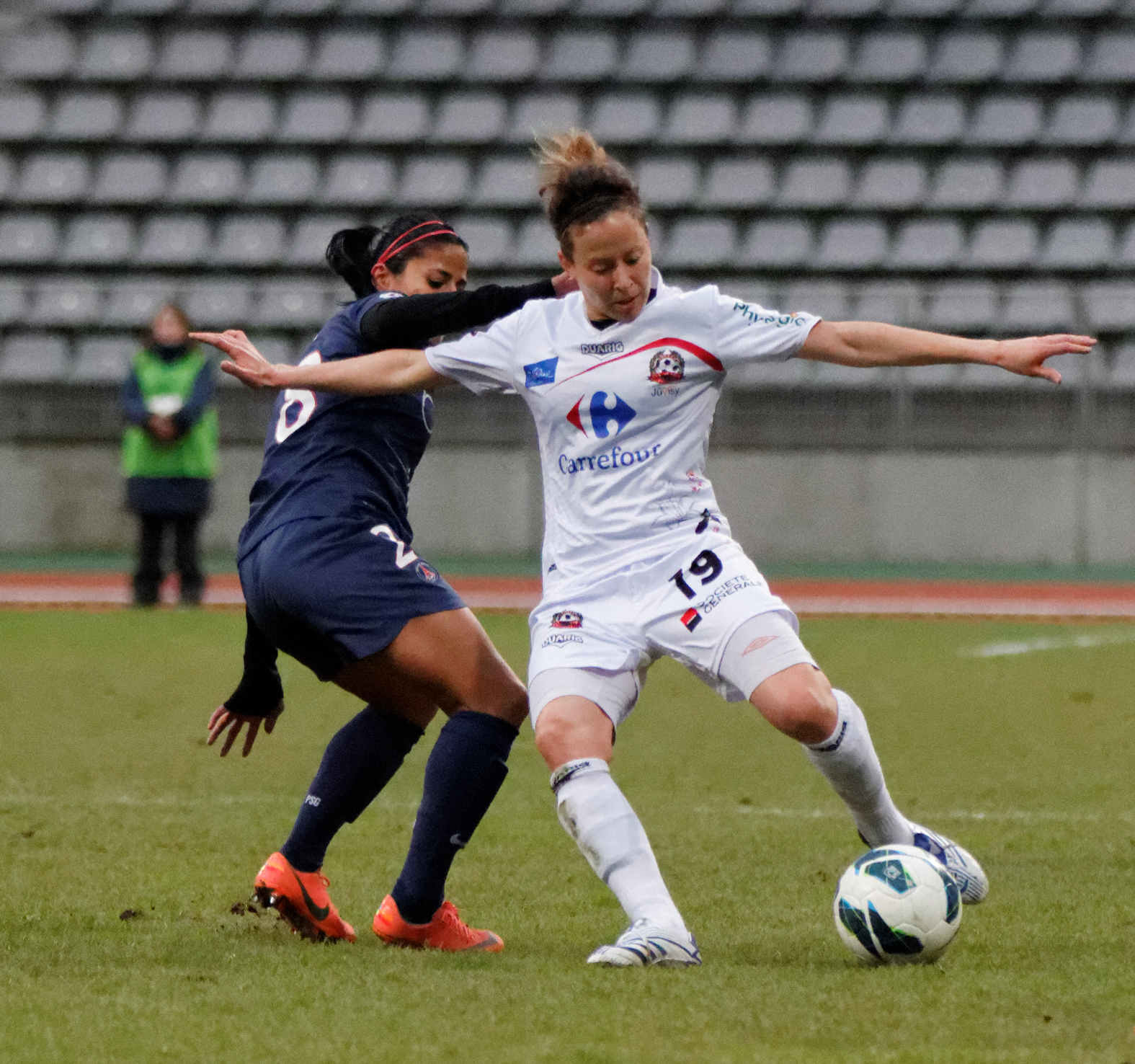

Personal information
- Date of birth: 6 February 1988 (age 38)
- Place of birth: Toulon, France
- Height: 1.67 m (5 ft 6 in)
- Position: Midfielder

Team information
- Current team: FCF Juvisy

Inès Dhaou (born 6 February 1988) is a French footballer who plays as a midfielder for FCF Juvisy.
