= List of Democratic Republic of the Congo women's international footballers =

This is a non-exhaustive list of Democratic Republic of the Congo women's international footballers – association football players who have appeared at least once for the senior DR Congo women's national football team.

== Players ==
Key
**Bold**	Named to the national team in the past year

Name	Caps	Goals	National team years	Club(s)
Oliva Amani	3+	0+	2006	Unknown
Sarrive Badiambila	1+	0+	2019	Unknown
**Rose Badimuena**	1+	0+	2021–	(Democratic Republic of the Congo) Amani
Sophie Basenga	1+	0+	2012	Unknown
**Kelly Bazoladio**	1+	0+	2021–	(Democratic Republic of the Congo) Amani
Nathalie Bioko	2+	0+	2006	Unknown
Christine Bongo	2+	0+	2006	Unknown
Gisèle Bosimba	2+	0+	2012	Unknown
Natacha Boyengwa	2+	0+	2019	Unknown
Mamie Buazo	3+	0+	2006	Unknown
Mwalutshe Bwadi	1+	0+	2012	Unknown
Isa Diakese	5+	1+	2012–	(Democratic Republic of the Congo) Amani
Charlène Diantesa	2+	0+	2012	Unknown
Rachelle Epanga	2+	0+	2019	Unknown
Farida Feza	3+	1+	2020–	(Democratic Republic of the Congo) Amani
**Naomie Kabakaba**	4+	2+	2019–	(Democratic Republic of the Congo) Mazembe
**Marlène Kasaj**	6+	4+	2019–	(Turkey) Adana İdman Yurdu
Ruth Kipoyi	4+	1+	2019–	(Turkey) ALG Spor
Youyou Kisita	3+	1+	2006	Unknown
**Sarah Kitenge**	1+	0+	2021–	(Democratic Republic of the Congo) Bikira
Guyssie Kiuvu	3+	0+	2006	Unknown
**Exaucée Kizinga**	5+	2+	2019–	(Turkey) Adana İdman Yurdu
**Benie Kubiena**	1+	0+	2021–	(Democratic Republic of the Congo) Amani
Mireille Kuyangisa	2+	0+	2012	Unknown
Syntiche Lawu	1+	0+	2020–	(Democratic Republic of the Congo) Amani
Nanouche Lumbu	1+	0+	2012	Unknown
Laurène Lusilawu	2+	0+	2012	(Democratic Republic of the Congo) Amani
Arlette Mafuta	1+	0+	2012	Unknown
**Judith Makela**	1+	0+	2021–	(Democratic Republic of the Congo) Bikira
Pamela Malembo	2+	0+	2012	Unknown
Mamie Manckay	2+	0+	2019	(Democratic Republic of the Congo) Mazembe
**Émeraude Mawanda**	1+	1+	2021–	(Democratic Republic of the Congo) Mazembe
Flavine Mawete	2+	0+	2019	(Turkey) Adana İdman Yurdu
**Merveille Mbemba**	1+	0+	2020–	(Democratic Republic of the Congo) Bikira
Violette Mbenza	3+	1+	2006	Unknown
Stéphanie Mbole	1+	0+	2012	Unknown
Grâce Mfwamba	3+	4+	2019–	(Turkey) ALG Spor
Lina Mpele	3+	0+	2012–	
Mundaya Balembo	2+	1+	2002–2006	Retired
Tantine Mushiya	1+	0+	2019	Unknown
Monica Ndaya	1+	0+	2019	Unknown
**Tina Ngalula**	1+	0+	2019	(Democratic Republic of the Congo) Mazembe
**Fideline Ngoy**	5+	0+	2012–	(Democratic Republic of the Congo) Amani
**Danny Ngoyi**	1+	0+	2019	(Democratic Republic of the Congo) Mazembe
Lucie Nona	2+	1+	2012	Unknown
Ade Ntima	2+	0+	2002–2006	Retired
Trésorine Nzuzi	3+	1+	2006	Unknown
**Falonne Pambani**	5+	2+	2012–	(Democratic Republic of the Congo) Amani
Carine Panda	1+	1+	2006	Unknown
Pitshou Tezi	3+	0+	2006	Unknown
Judith Tondo	2+	0+	2012	Unknown
Jolie Tuzolana	3+	0+	2006	Unknown
Cyrille Zuma	4+	2+	2006	Retired

== See also ==
- DR Congo women's national football team
