= Trésorine Nzuzi =

DR Congolese footballer

Personal information
- Full name: Trésorine Nzuzi Vumongo
- Date of birth: 11 October 1988 (age 38)
- Height: 1.60 m (5 ft 3 in)
- Position: Forward

Senior career*
Years	Team	Apps	(Gls)
- La Source
- Force Terrestre

International career^{‡}
2006	DR Congo U20	3+	(1+)
2006	DR Congo	3+	(1+)
- * Club domestic league appearances and goals ‡ National team caps and goals as of 4 November 2006.

Trésorine Nzuzi Vumongo (born 11 October 1988) is a DR Congolese footballer who plays as a forward. She has been a member of the DR Congo women's national team.

== Club career ==
Nzuzi has played for La Source in the Republic of the Congo and for Force Terrestre in the Democratic Republic of the Congo.

== International career ==
Nzuzi was capped for the DR Congo at senior level during the 2006 African Women's Championship.

=== International goals ===
Scores and results list DR Congo's goal tally first

No.	Date	Venue	Opponent	Score	Result	Competition	Ref.
1	4 November 2006	Ughelli Township Stadium, Ughelli, Nigeria	Ghana	1–2	1–3	2006 African Women's Championship	

== See also ==
- List of Democratic Republic of the Congo women's international footballers
