= Hong Myong-gum =

North Korean footballer (born 1986)

Personal information
- Date of birth: 10 July 1986 (age 40)
- Position: Defender

Senior career*
Years	Team	Apps	(Gls)
- Amrokgang

International career^{‡}
	North Korea	2	(0)
- * Club domestic league appearances and goals ‡ National team caps and goals as of 10 September 2007 (before the 2007 FIFA Women's World Cup)

Hong Myong-gum (Korean: 홍명금; born 10 July 1986) is a North Korean footballer who plays as a defender for the North Korea women's national football team. She was part of the team at the 2007 FIFA Women's World Cup. At the club level, she plays for Amrokgang in North Korea.
