= Kim Song-hui (footballer) =

North Korean footballer

Personal information
- Date of birth: 23 February 1987
- Place of birth: Pyongyang, North Korea
- Height: 1.60 m (5 ft 3 in)
- Position: Striker

Team information
- Current team: Pyongyang

Senior career*
Years	Team	Apps	(Gls)
- Pyongyang

International career^{‡}
	Korea DPR	18	(5)
- * Club domestic league appearances and goals as of 05:30, 26 July 2012 (UTC) ‡ National team caps and goals as of 05:30, 26 July 2012 (UTC)

- Kim Song-hui
- Hangul: 김성희
- RR: Gim Seonghui
- MR: Kim Sŏnghŭi

Kim Song-hui (Korean: 김성희; Korean pronunciation: [kim.sʌŋ.ɦi]; (born 23 February 1987) is a North Korean female footballer, who played as a striker for Pyongyang Sports Club in the Women's DPR Korea League.

Kim was selected for the North Korea women's national team, participating in the 2012 Summer Olympics and scored their two opening goals of the tournament on 25 July 2012, in a 2–0 win at Hampden Park, Glasgow against Colombia.

== International goals ==
No.	Date	Venue	Opponent	Score	Result	Competition
1.	9 June 2012	Henri Houtsaegerstadion, Koksijde, Belgium	Belgium	1–0	2–2	Friendly
2.	9 June 2012	Henri Houtsaegerstadion, Koksijde, Belgium	Belgium	2–1	2–2	Friendly
3.	25 July 2012	Hampden Park Glasgow, Scotland	Colombia	1–0	2–0	2012 Summer Olympics
4.	25 July 2012	Hampden Park Glasgow, Scotland	Colombia	2–0	2–0	2012 Summer Olympics
