= Francielle =

Brazilian footballer (born 1989)

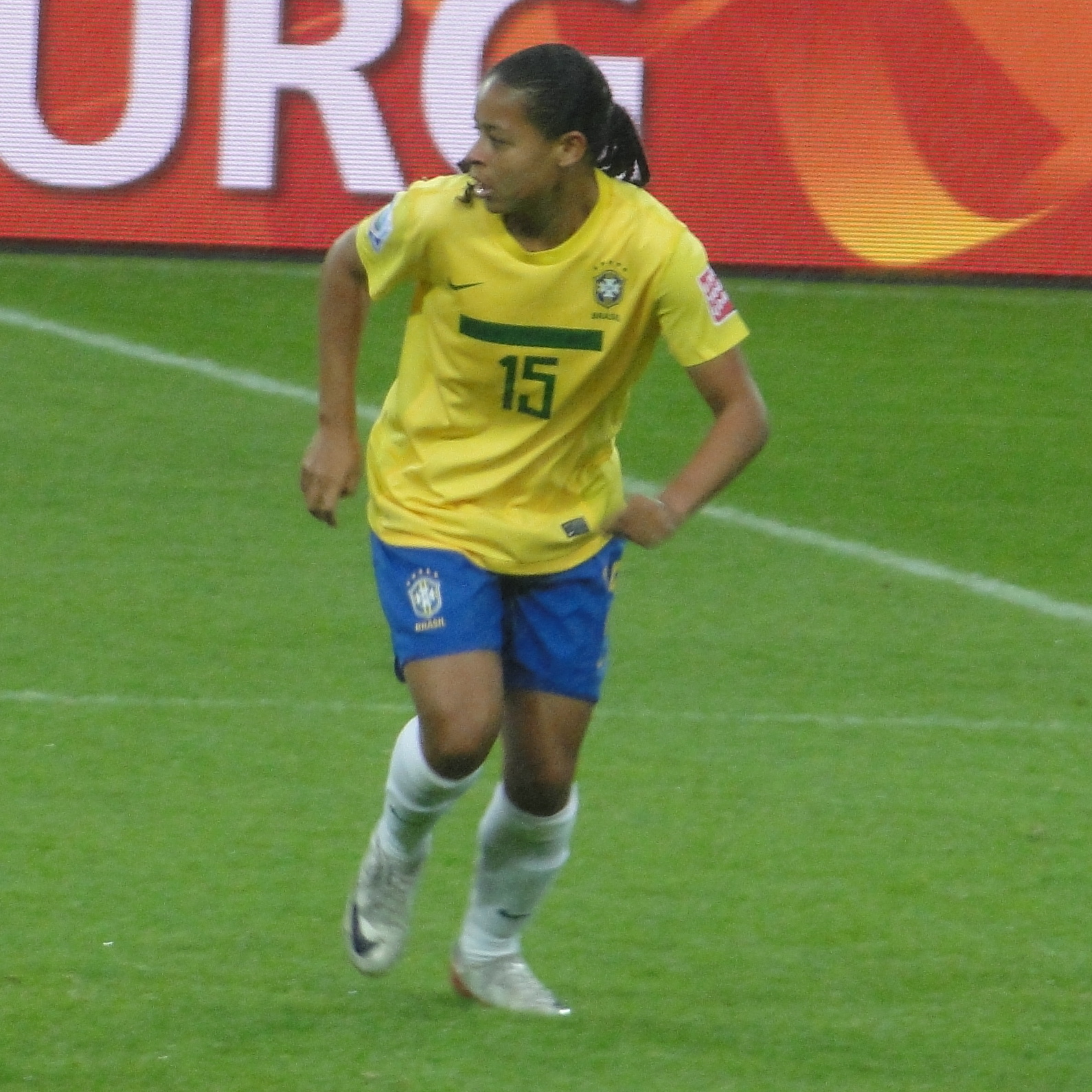

Personal information
- Full name: Francielle Manoel Alberto
- Date of birth: 18 October 1989 (age 37)
- Place of birth: São Paulo, Brazil
- Height: 1.60 m (5 ft 3 in)
- Positions: Midfielder; forward

Youth career
- Itanhaém

Senior career*
Years	Team	Apps	(Gls)
2006–2008	Santos		
2009	Saint Louis Athletica	6	(0)
2009	Sky Blue FC	4	(1)
2009–2010	Santos		
2011–2014	São José		
2015	Boston Breakers	0	(0)
2015	Stjarnan	7	(6)
2016	Corinthians Audax	9	(1)
2017–2018	Avaldsnes IL	30	(5)

International career^{‡}
- Brazil U-20
- Brazil U-23
2006–2017	Brazil	24	(2)
Medal record
Representing Brazil
Olympic Games – Women's Football
Silver medal – second place	2008 Beijing	Team competition
Pan American Games
Silver medal – second place	2011 Guadalajara	Team competition
- * Club domestic league appearances and goals as of 12:30, 25 April 2019 (UTC) ‡ National team caps and goals as of 12:30, 25 April 2019 (UTC)

Francielle Manoel Alberto (born 18 October 1989), commonly known as Francielle or Fran, is a former Brazilian footballer who played as a midfielder. At club level, she most recently played for Norwegian Toppserien club Avaldsnes IL. She previously played for Corinthians, São José and Santos in Brazil, as well as for Saint Louis Athletica and Sky Blue FC of Women's Professional Soccer (WPS).

== Club career ==
=== United States ===
Francielle was on the opening day roster for St. Louis Athletica in the inaugural season of the WPS in 2009, and played in six matches for them.

On 26 June 2009, St. Louis Athletica traded Francielle and Kerri Hanks to Sky Blue FC for Sarah Walsh. She scored the game-winning goal in the first round of the WPS playoffs at the Washington Freedom. Sky Blue later defeated Francielle's former team, the Athletica, and the Los Angeles Sol to win the 2009 WPS title.

=== Brazil ===
Francielle won the 2009 Copa Libertadores Femenina with Santos.

In 2013, Francielle and São José won the Copa Libertadores. In 2013 and 2014 she and her team also won league and cup titles.

=== Boston Breakers ===
On 10 November 2014, the Boston Breakers signed Francielle for the 2015 NWSL season. Ultimately she never joined the Breakers as she was instead called into Brazil's residency camp for the 2015 FIFA Women's World Cup.

=== Stjarnan ===
In summer 2015, Francielle and compatriot Poliana agreed to play for Icelandic Úrvalsdeild club Stjarnan in their UEFA Women's Champions League campaign.

=== Avaldsnes ===
After spending 2016 back in Brazil with Corinthians Audax, Francielle joined a Brazilian contingent at Avaldsnes IL. She helped the team win the 2017 Norwegian Women's Cup, before departing during the 2018 Toppserien season.

== International career ==
In November 2006, Francielle made her senior international debut in Brazil's 2–0 South American Women's Football Championship win over Peru at Estadio José María Minella, Mar del Plata.

Francielle appeared in all four of Brazil's matches at the 2011 Women's World Cup, and converted a penalty kick in the overtime shootout of the quarterfinal match versus the United States. In the 2008 Beijing Olympics, Francielle appeared in five of Brazil's six matches, winning a silver medal. Francielle's first goal in a major international tournament came at the 2012 London Olympics versus Cameroon, where she played in all four of Brazil's matches.

In October 2017, Francielle was one of five Brazil players to quit international football, disgruntled at pay and conditions, and the Brazilian Football Confederation's sacking of head coach Emily Lima.

== Personal life ==
Francielle is married to Andressa Alves.

== Career statistics ==
=== International goals ===
International goals
#	Date	Venue	Opponent	Score	Result	Competition
1.	5 April 2012	Home's Stadium Kobe, Kobe, Japan	Japan	1–1	4–1	2012 Women's Kirin Challenge Cup
2.	25 July 2012	Millennium Stadium, Cardiff, United Kingdom	Cameroon	0–1	0–5	2012 Summer Olympics
3.	9 April 2017	Arena da Amazônia, Manaus, Brazil	Bolivia	1–0	6–0	Friendly match
