= Juliane Maier =

German association football player

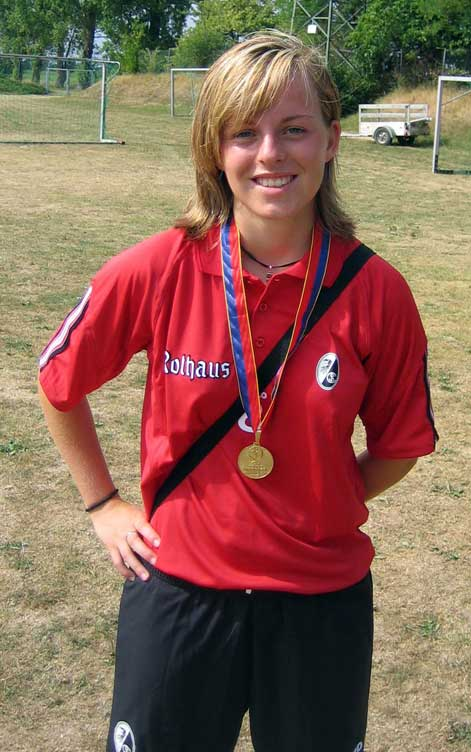

Personal information
- Date of birth: 9 April 1987 (age 39)
- Place of birth: Villingen-Schwenningen, Germany
- Height: 1.68 m (5 ft 6 in)
- Position: Midfielder

Senior career*
Years	Team	Apps	(Gls)
2002–2006	SV Titisee		
2006–2017	SC Freiburg	207	(44)
2017–2022	Alemannia Zähringen		

International career
2005–2006	Germany U19	12	(4)
2006	Germany U20	4	(1)
	Germany U23	6	(0)
- * Club domestic league appearances and goals

Juliane Maier (born 9 April 1987) is a former German footballer who played as a midfielder for SC Freiburg.

Until February 2024, she held the club's record for most Bundesliga appearances, playing a total of 185 matches. With 240 competitive appearances and 11 years in the professional squad, she ranks among Freiburg's record appearance holders.
