= Tempa Ndah =

Beninese football referee (born 1973)

Rosalie Tempa Ndah François
- Full name: Rosalie Tempa Ndah François
- Born: 15 April 1973 (age 53); Benin
- Other occupation: Hairdresser

Domestic
Years	League	Role

International
Years	League	Role
2003–	FIFA-listed	Assistant referee

Rosalie Tempa Ndah François (born April 15, 1973) is a Beninese football referee.

A hairdresser by profession, she officiated at her first International match in 2003 before going on to referee the 2003 All-Africa Games football final and was an assistant referee at the 2007 FIFA Women's World Cup in China.

Ndah was nominated as one of the best assistant referee's in the 2007 Oscars du football béninois (Beninese football Oscars). She also served as an assistant referee at the Summer Olympics in 2008 and 2012 and at the 2011 FIFA Women's World Cup.
