= Maureen Eke =

Nigerian footballer

Personal information
- Date of birth: 19 December 1986 (age 39)
- Position: Midfielder

Senior career*
Years	Team	Apps	(Gls)
- Delta Queens FC

International career^{‡}
	Nigeria	3	(0)
- * Club domestic league appearances and goals ‡ National team caps and goals as of 10 September 2007 (before the 2007 FIFA Women's World Cup)

Maureen Eke (born 19 December 1986) is a Nigerian women's international footballer who plays as a midfielder. She is a member of the Nigeria women's national football team and was in the team at the 2007 FIFA Women's World Cup. At club level, Eke plays for Delta Queens FC. Maureen is 39 years old.
