= 2006 African Women's Championship =

7th edition of WAFCON

Tournament details
- Host country: Nigeria
- Dates: 28 October – 11 November
- Teams: 8
- Venues: 4 (in 4 host cities)

Final positions
- Champions: Nigeria (7th title)
- Runners-up: Ghana
- Third place: South Africa
- Fourth place: Cameroon

Tournament statistics
- Matches played: 16
- Goals scored: 54 (3.38 per match)
- Top scorer: (Nigeria) Perpetua Nkwocha (7 goals)
- Best player: (South Africa) Portia Modise

The 2006 African Women's Championship was the 7th edition of the biennial African women's association football tournament organized by the Confederation of African Football. Originally scheduled to be held in Gabon in September, it took place in Nigeria for the 4th time from 28 October to 11 November 2006.

Gabon withdrew as hosts due to "organizational reasons", thus CAF gave this tournament edition's hosting rights to Nigeria in May 2006. Initially, this edition of the tournament was scheduled for September 2006, but it was moved to October due to weather considerations.

This edition of the tournament also doubled as the African qualification for the 2007 FIFA Women's World Cup. Nigeria won its 5th consecutive title, beating Ghana 1–0 in the final, although both finalists were guaranteed qualification to that edition of the international tournament in China. South Africa's Portia Modise was named player of the championship.

== Qualification ==
The original hosts (Gabon) qualified automatically, while the remaining seven spots were determined by the qualification rounds which took place from March to August 2006.

Nigeria initially entered qualification at the second round and was scheduled to play Equatorial Guinea when CAF elected them as replacement hosts, thus that match was scrapped and both teams qualified for the group stage at Gabon's expense.

=== Format ===
Qualification ties were played on a home-and-away two-legged basis. If the aggregate score was tied after the second leg, the away goals rule would be applied; if scores still level, extra time would be skipped and the use of a penalty shoot-out would determine the qualifier. The seven winners of the qualification round qualified for the group stage.

=== Qualified teams ===
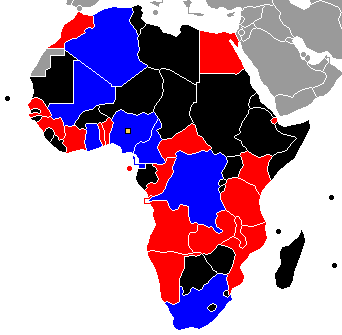
Qualified Did not qualify Did not enter or withdrew Not part of CAF

Equatorial Guinea made their tournament debut at this edition.

Team	Qualified as	Qualified on	Previous tournament appearances (Note: Bold indicates champions for that year. Italic indicates hosts for that year.)
Nigeria	Replacement hosts	17 May 2006	6 (**1991**, **1995**, **1998**, **2000**, **2002**, **2004**)
Equatorial Guinea	By default	17 May 2006	Debut
South Africa	Winners against Tanzania	4 August 2006	5 (1995, 1998, 2000, 2002, 2004)
Algeria	Winners against Egypt	5 August 2006	1 (2004)
Ghana	Winners by default against Congo	5 August 2006	6 (1991, 1995, 1998, 2000, 2002, 2004)
Cameroon	Winners against Kenya	5 August 2006	5 (1991, 1998, 2000, 2002)
DR Congo	Winners against Senegal	5 August 2006	1 (1998)
Mali	Winners against Benin	6 August 2006	2 (2002, 2004)

== Group stage ==
=== Tiebreakers ===
If two or more teams in the group stage are tied on points tie-breakers are in order:

1. greater number of points in matches between tied teams
2. superior goal difference in matches between tied teams
3. greater number of goals scored in matches between tied teams
4. superior goal difference in all group matches
5. greater number of goals scored in all group matches
6. fair play criteria based on red and yellow cards received
7. drawing of lots

=== Group A ===
Equatorial Guinea arrived at Murtala Muhammed International Airport in a private chartered plane which had no clearance to land, with its players unable to disembark for 3 hours. This left them no other choice than to return home unhappy with the treatment they received by airport officials despite organizers trying to remedy the situation. However, their first match was played as scheduled.

Pos	Team	Pld	W	D	L	GF	GA	GD	Pts	Qualification
1	Nigeria (H)	3	3	0	0	12	2	+10	9	Advance to knockout stage
2	South Africa	3	2	0	1	6	2	+4	6	Advance to knockout stage
3	Equatorial Guinea	3	0	1	2	5	9	−4	1 (Note: Tied on head-to-head points. Overall goal difference: Equatorial Guinea −4, Algeria −10.)	
4	Algeria	3	0	1	2	3	13	−10	1	

Rules for classification: Group stage tiebreakers
(H) Hosts
Notes:
28 October 2006

South Africa	4–0	Algeria
Phewa 1', 35'; Nompumelolo 38'; Solomon 90'	Report (BBC)

Warri Stadium, Warri

28 October 2006

Nigeria	4–2	Equatorial Guinea
Uwak 4', 9'; Nkwocha 34'; Ajayi 89'	Report (archived)	Chinasa Okoro 16'; Essiane 22'

Oleh, Delta

31 October 2006

Algeria	0–6	Nigeria
	Report (BBC)	Ajayi 8'; Nkwocha 20', 90+'; Madu 35'; Ekpo 56'; Uwak 89'

Warri Stadium, Warri

31 October 2006

Equatorial Guinea	0–2	South Africa
	Report (archived)	Nkosi 63'; Solomon 75'

Oleh, Delta

3 November 2006

Equatorial Guinea	3–3	Algeria
Añonman 2'; Essiane 72', 78'	Report (archived)	Boumrar 35'; Bouhani 56', 76'

Township Stadium, Oghara

3 November 2006

Nigeria	2–0	South Africa
Uwak 4', 43'	Report (BBC)

Oleh, Delta

=== Group B ===
Pos	Team	Pld	W	D	L	GF	GA	GD	Pts	Qualification
1	Ghana	3	3	0	0	6	2	+4	9	Advance to knockout stage
2	Cameroon	3	1	1	1	4	3	+1	4	Advance to knockout stage
3	Mali	3	1	0	2	3	5	−2	3	
4	DR Congo	3	0	1	2	4	7	−3	1	

Rules for classification: Group stage tiebreakers
29 October 2006

Mali	0–1	Ghana
	Report (BBC)	Rumanatu 56'

Township Stadium, Oghara

29 October 2006
14:00

Cameroon	1–1	DR Congo
Ngono Mani 1'	Report (archived)	Kisita 57'

Township Stadium, Ughelli

1 November 2006

Ghana	2–1	Cameroon
Amankwa 28', 90+'	Report (BBC)	Bella 53'

Ughelli Township Stadium, Ughelli

1 November 2006
14:00

DR Congo	2–3	Mali
Zuma 28'; Mafuta 85'	Report (archived)	Doumbia 36'; Diarra 69', 90'

Township Stadium, Oghara

4 November 2006
16:00

DR Congo	1–3	Ghana
Nzuzi 51'	Report (archived)	Amankwa 22', 32'; Okoe 84'

Township Stadium, Ughelli

4 November 2006

Cameroon	2–0	Mali
Bekombo 42'; Ngo Ndoumbouk 74'	Report (BBC)

Warri Stadium, Warri

== Knockout stage ==
=== Bracket ===
Semi-finals
7 November - Warri
Nigeria	5
Cameroon	0
7 November - Oghara
Ghana	1
South Africa	0

Final
11 November - Warri
Nigeria	1
Ghana	0
Third place play-off
10 November - Delta
Cameroon	2 (4)
South Africa (p)	2 (5)

=== Semi-finals ===
Winners qualified for the 2007 FIFA Women's World Cup in China.

7 November 2006

Nigeria	5–0	Cameroon
Uwak 33'; Nkwocha 45', 46', 54'; Ekpo 61'	Report (archived)

Warri Stadium, Warri

7 November 2006

Ghana	1–0	South Africa
Okoe 88' (pen.)	Report (archived)

Township Stadium, Oghara

=== Third place play-off ===
10 November 2006

Cameroon	2–2	South Africa
Bella 48' (pen.); Ngono 81'	Report (archived)	Modise 4'; Makhanya 61'
Penalties
	4–5

Ughelli Township Stadium Oleh, Delta

=== Final ===
11 November 2006

Nigeria	1–0	Ghana
Nkwocha 13'	Report (archived)

Warri Stadium, Warri
Attendance: 25,000

This match was described by the BBC as "a drab encounter".

== Awards ==
2006 African Women's Championship winners

Nigeria
7th title
