= Football at the 2012 Summer Olympics – Women's tournament – Group E =

== Standings ==
Pos	Team	Pld	W	D	L	GF	GA	GD	Pts	Qualification
1	Great Britain	3	3	0	0	5	0	+5	9	Qualified for the quarter-finals
2	Brazil	3	2	0	1	6	1	+5	6	Qualified for the quarter-finals
3	New Zealand	3	1	0	2	3	3	0	3	Qualified for the quarter-finals
4	Cameroon	3	0	0	3	1	11	−10	0	

Source: IOC

== Great Britain vs New Zealand ==
25 July 2012
16:00

Great Britain	1–0	New Zealand
Houghton 64'	Report

Millennium Stadium, Cardiff
Attendance: 24,445
Referee: Kari Seitz (United States)

Great Britain	New Zealand

GK	1	Karen Bardsley
DF	2	Alex Scott
DF	3	Steph Houghton
DF	6	Casey Stoney (c)
DF	13	Ifeoma Dieke
MF	4	Jill Scott
MF	12	Kim Little		(substituted off) HT'
MF	14	Anita Asante	(yellow card) 3'
FW	7	Karen Carney		(substituted off) 89'
FW	10	Kelly Smith		(substituted off) 69'
FW	15	Eniola Aluko
Substitutions:
FW	9	Ellen White		(substituted on) HT'
MF	11	Rachel Yankey		(substituted on) 69'
MF	8	Fara Williams		(substituted on) 89'
Manager:
Hope Powell

GK	1	Jenny Bindon
DF	2	Ria Percival
DF	4	Katie Hoyle
DF	5	Abby Erceg
DF	6	Rebecca Smith (c)
DF	7	Ali Riley
MF	8	Hayley Moorwood		(substituted off) 60'
MF	11	Kirsty Yallop		(substituted off) 75'
FW	9	Amber Hearn
FW	10	Sarah Gregorius
FW	17	Hannah Wilkinson	(yellow card) 43'
Substitutions:
MF	12	Betsy Hassett		(substituted on) 60'
MF	16	Annalie Longo		(substituted on) 75'
Manager:
(United Kingdom) Tony Readings

Assistant referees:
Veronica Perez (United States)
Marlene Duffy (United States)
Fourth official:
Quetzalli Alvarado (Mexico)

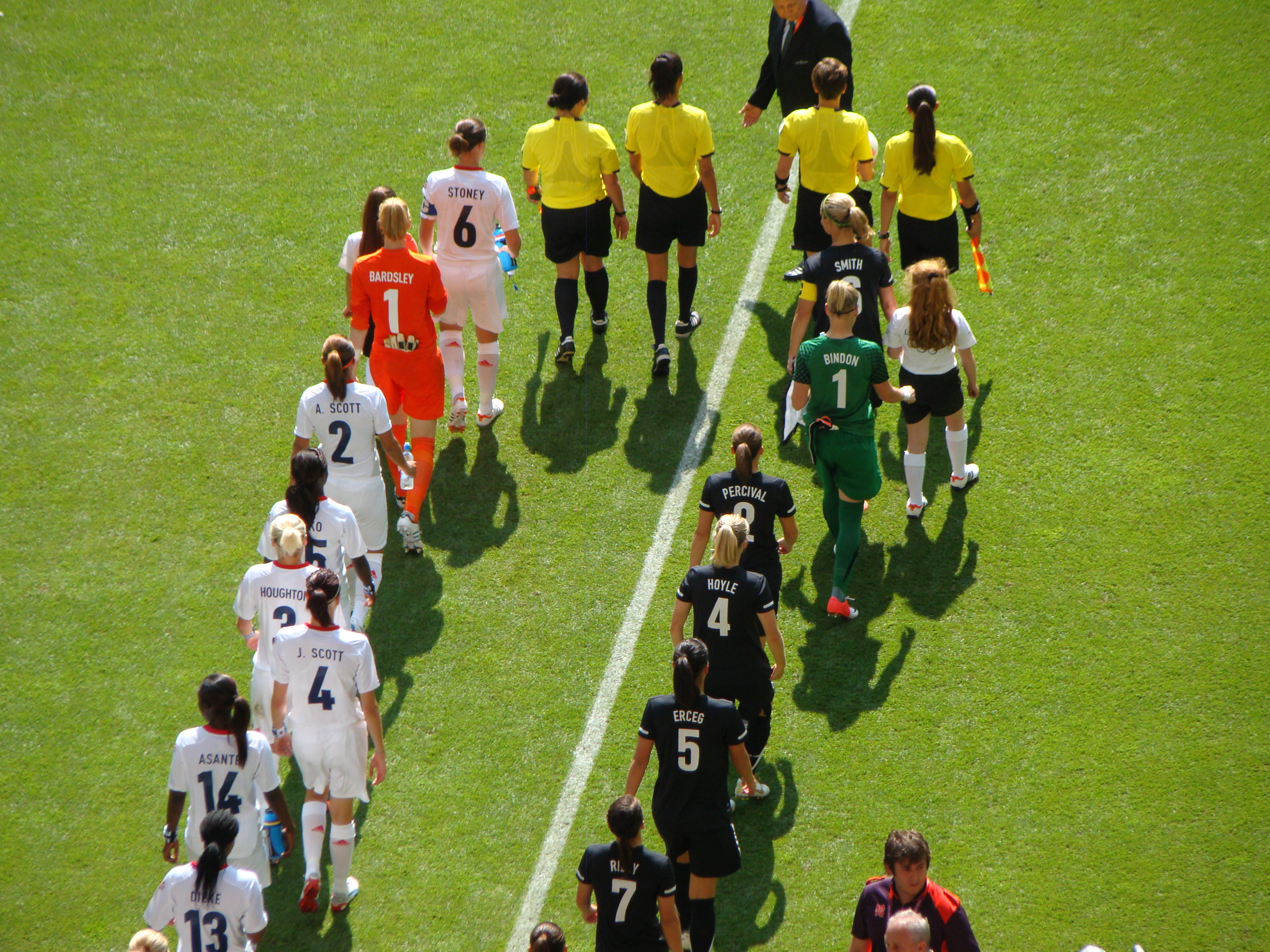

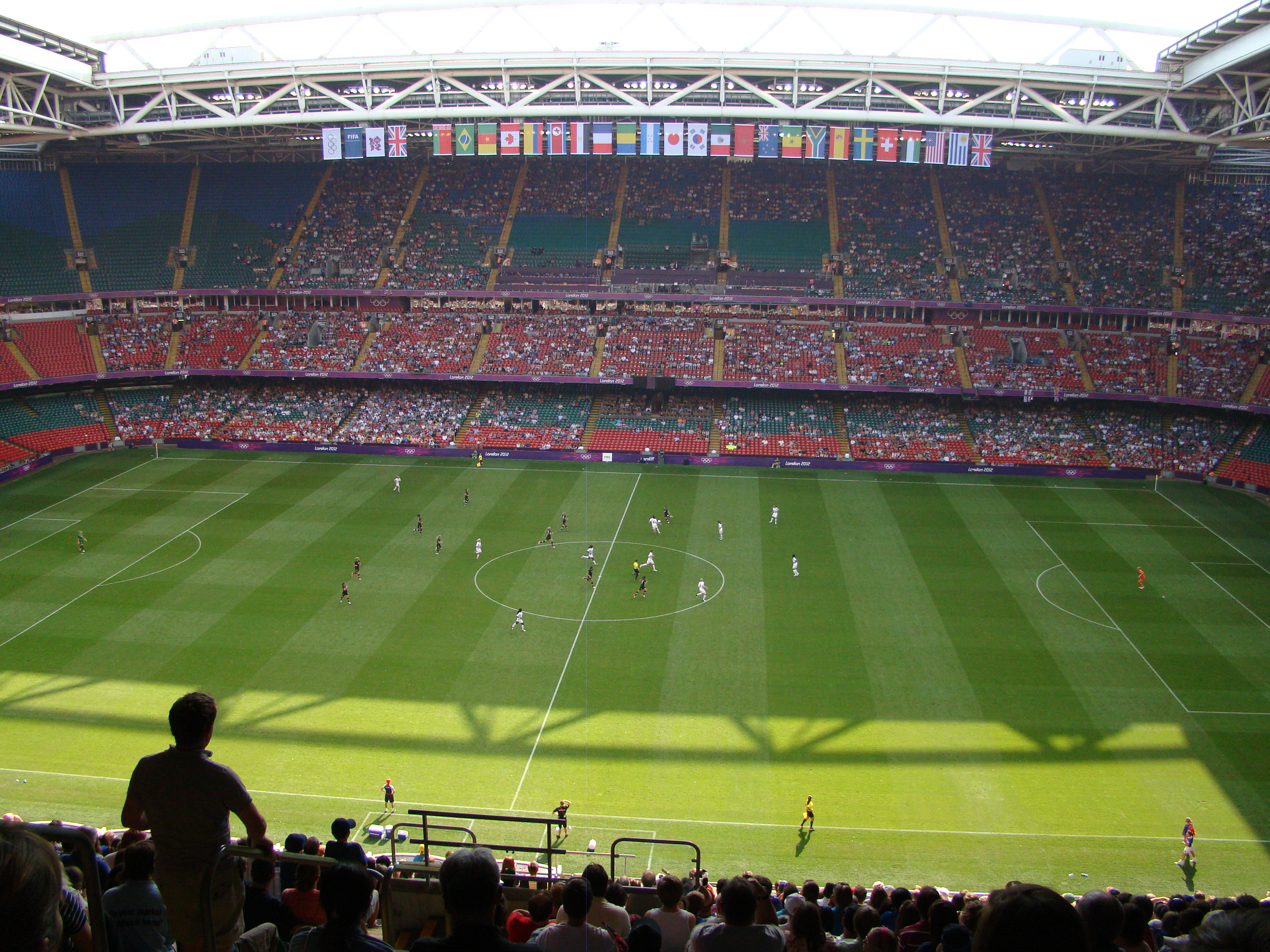

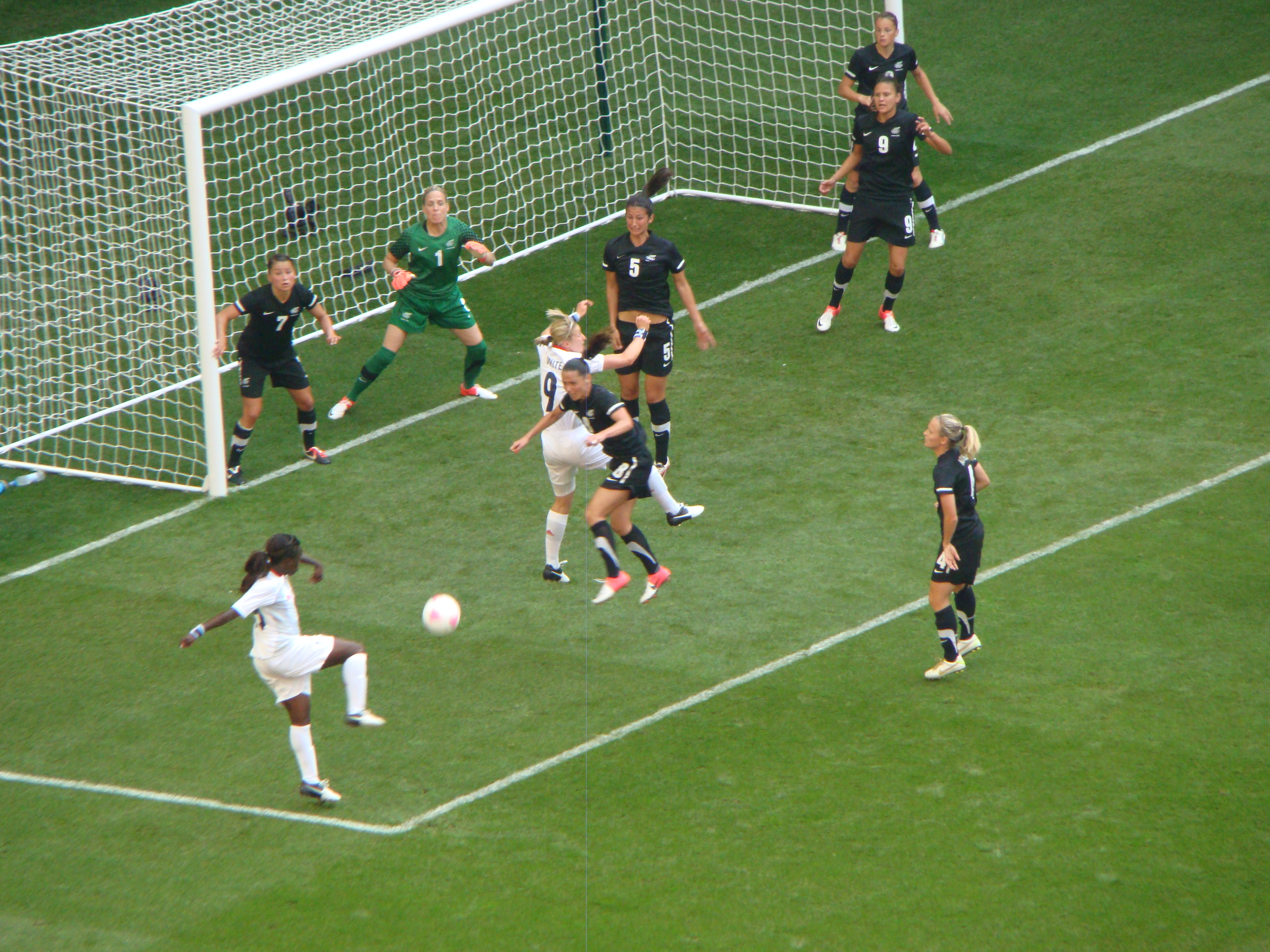

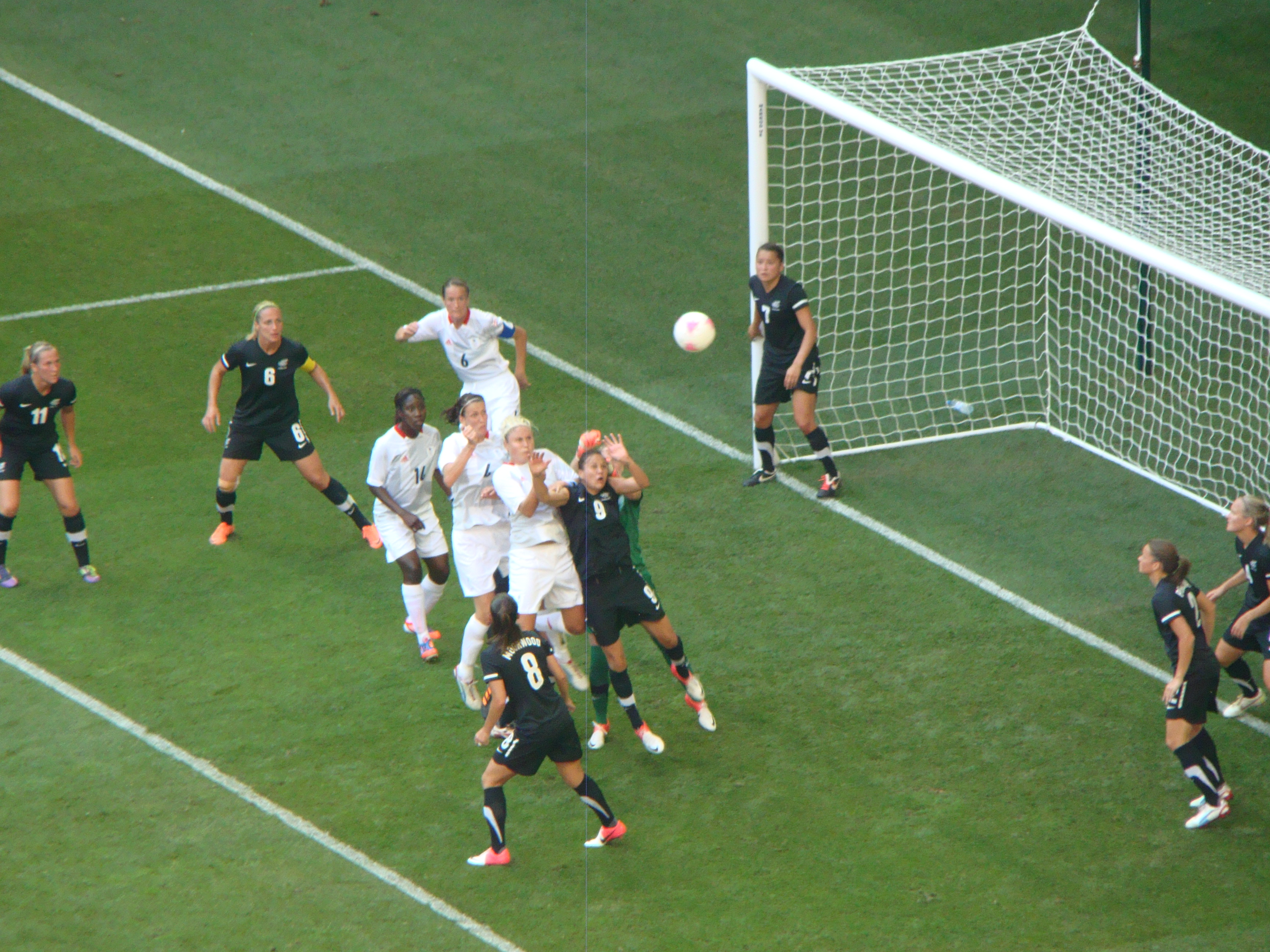

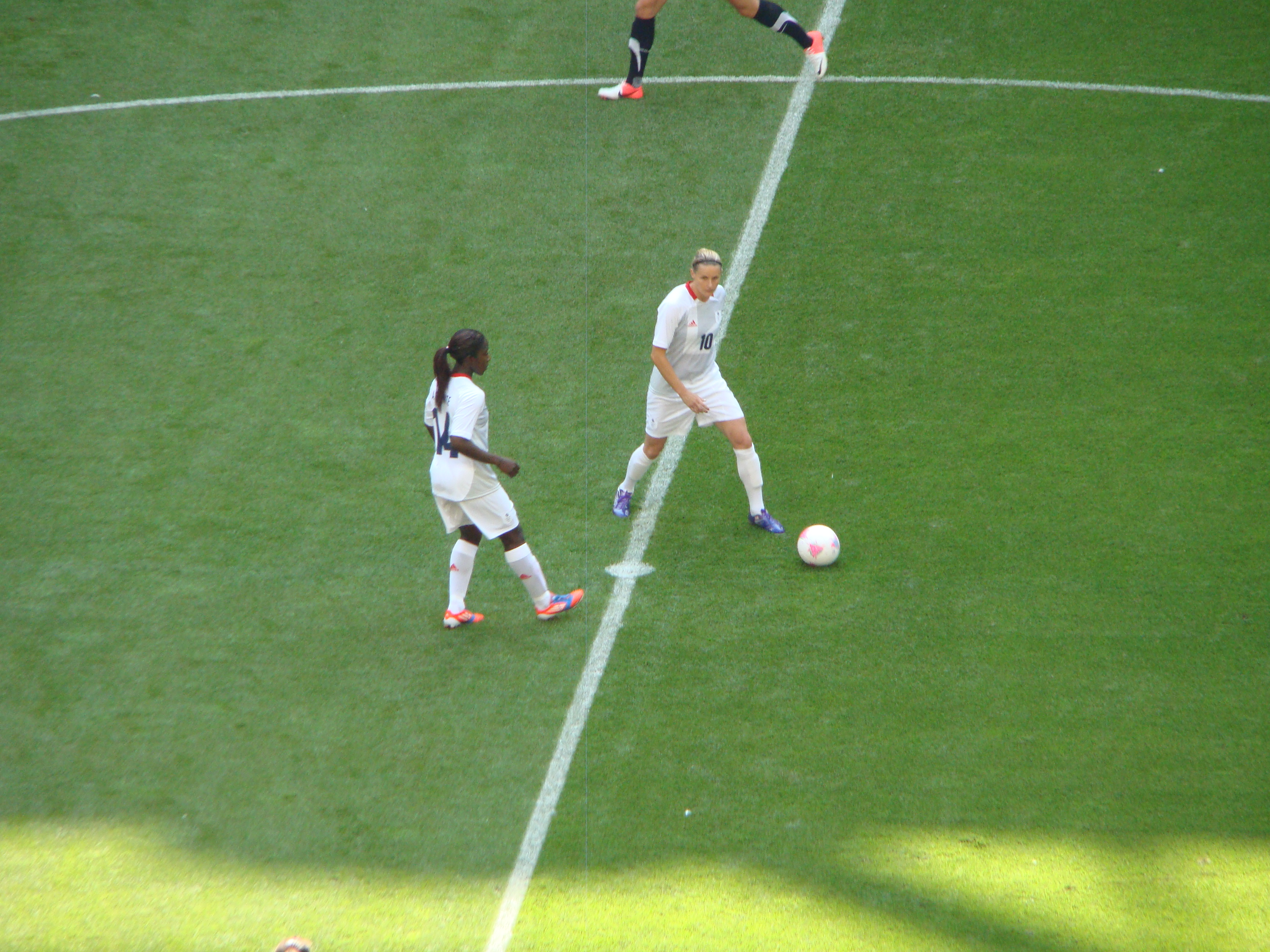

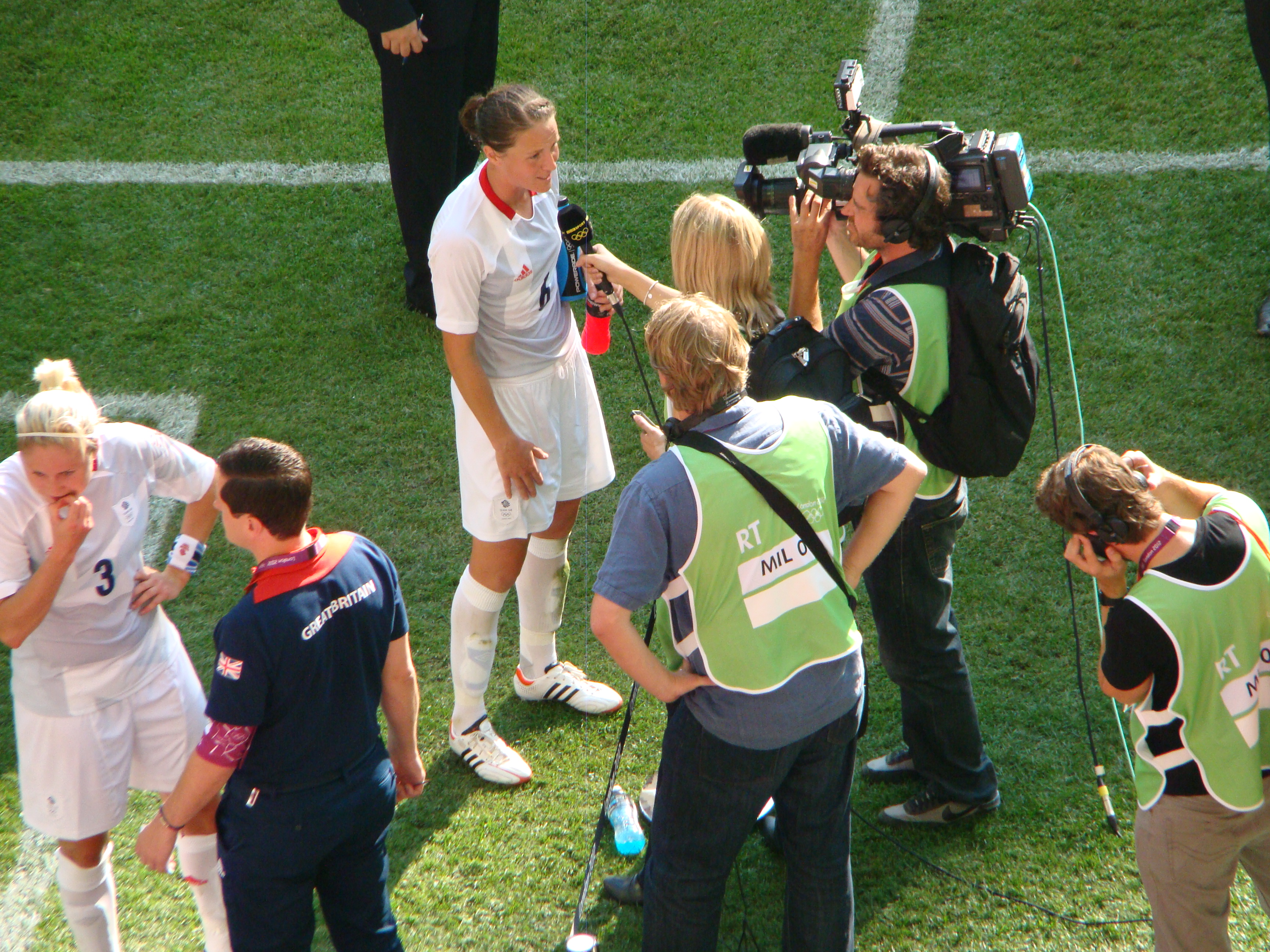

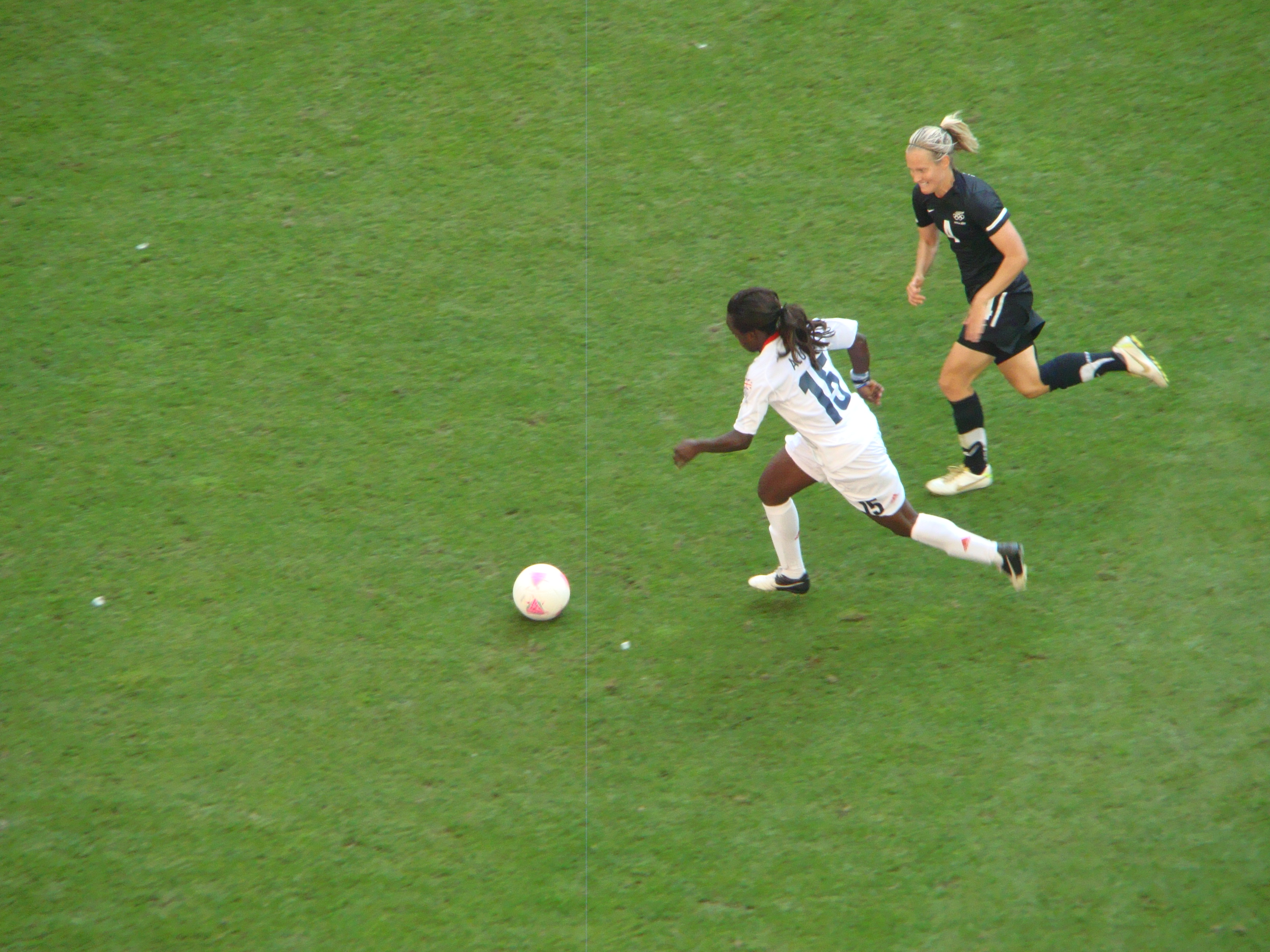

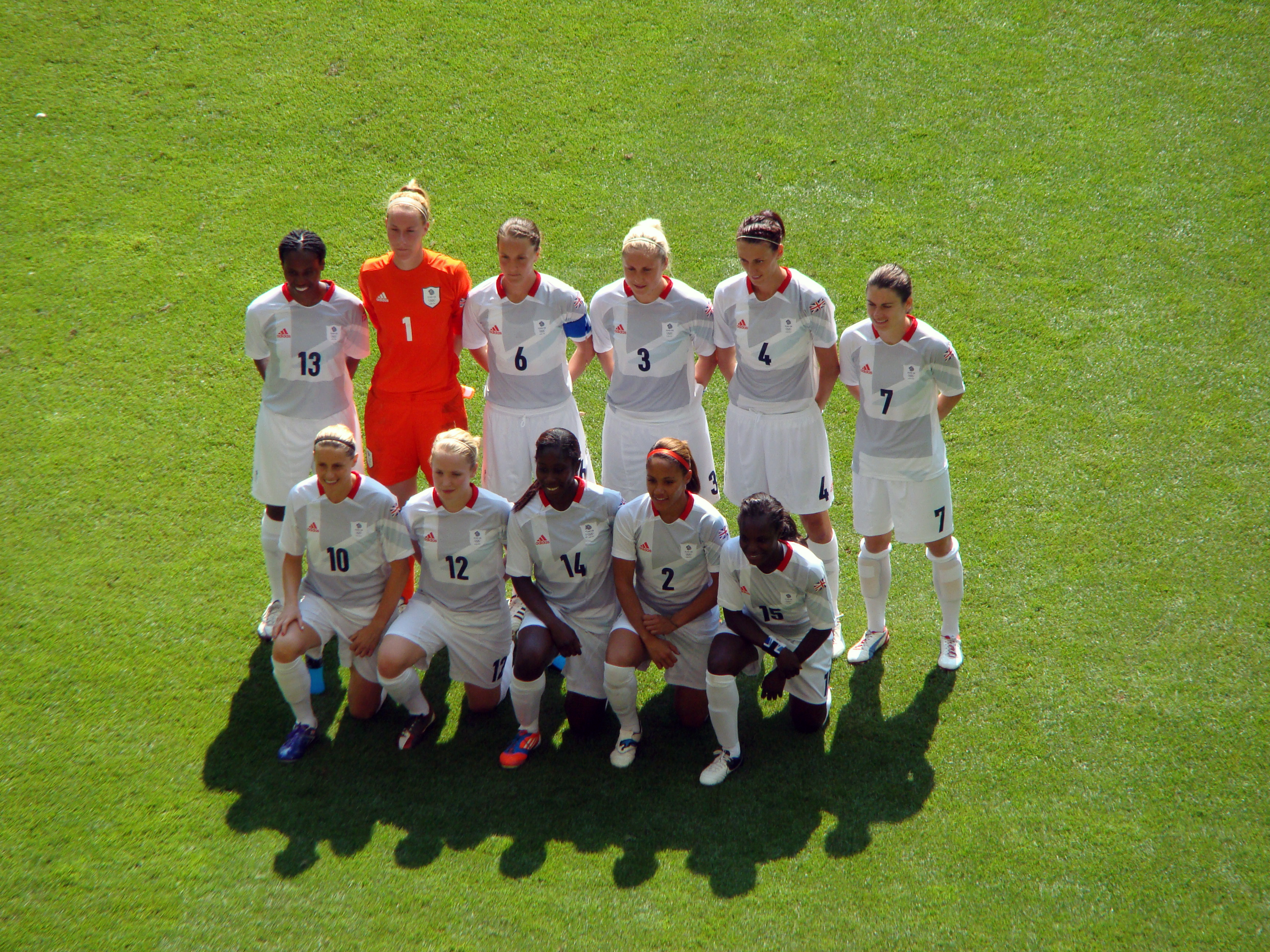

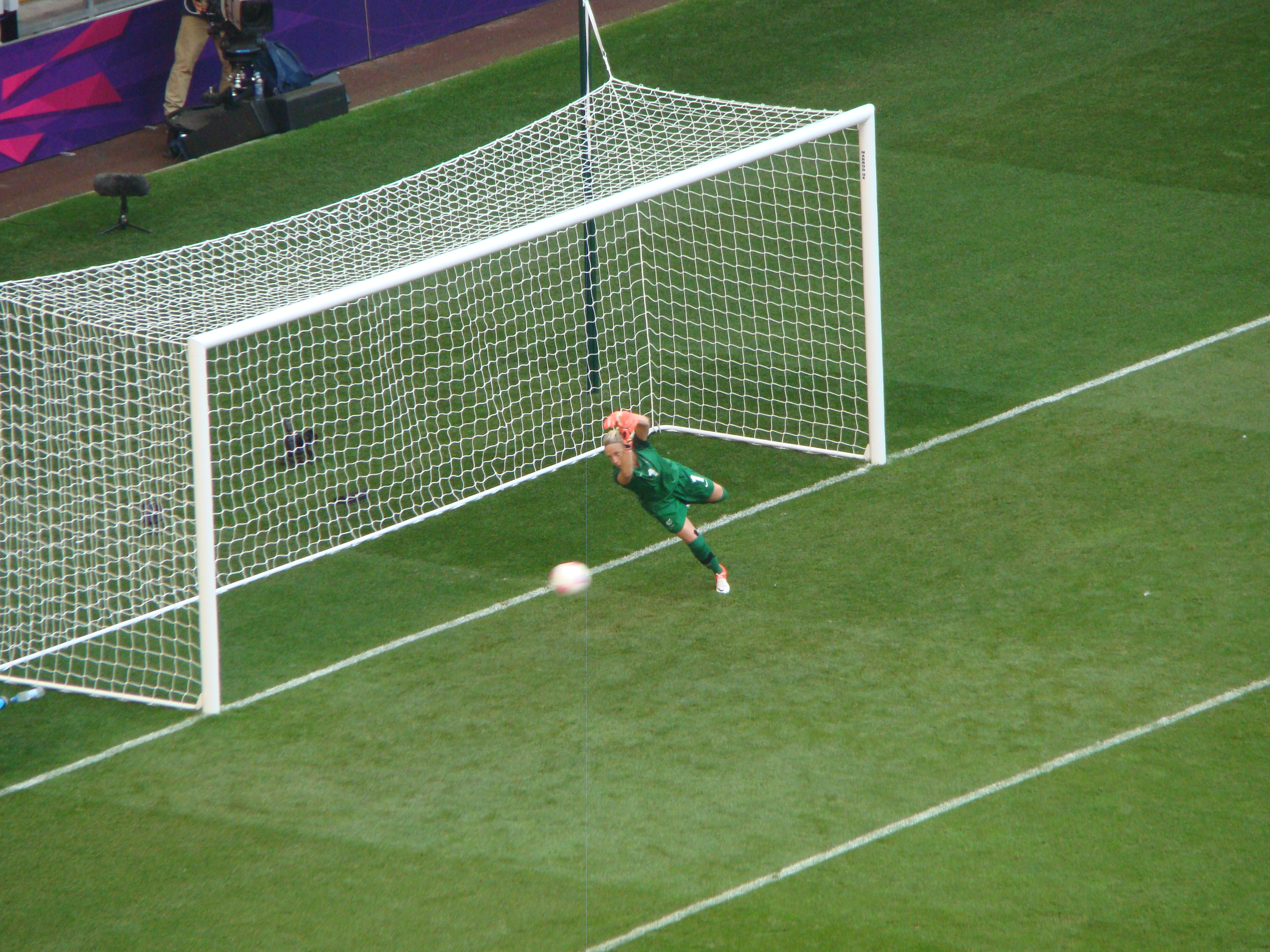

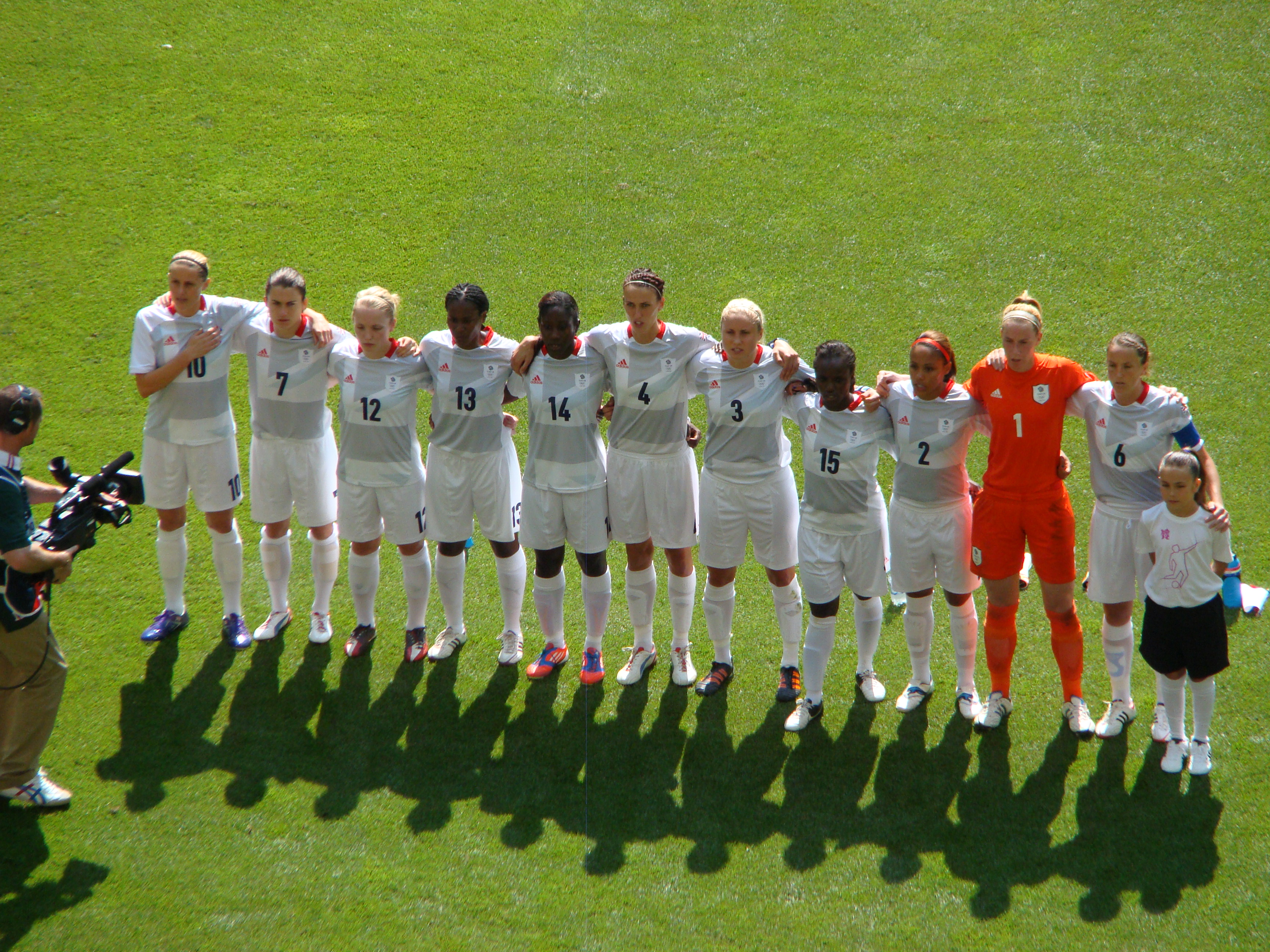

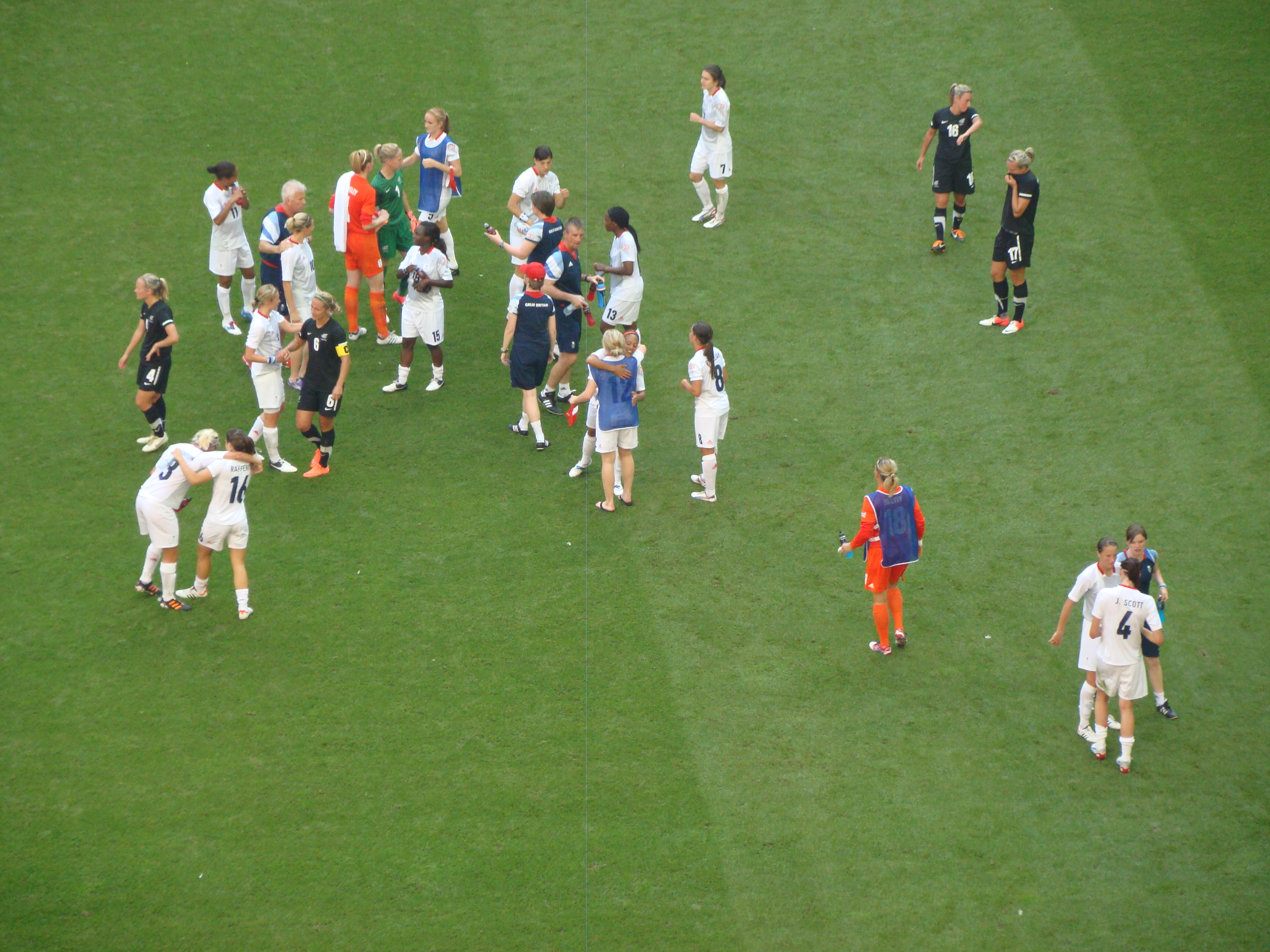

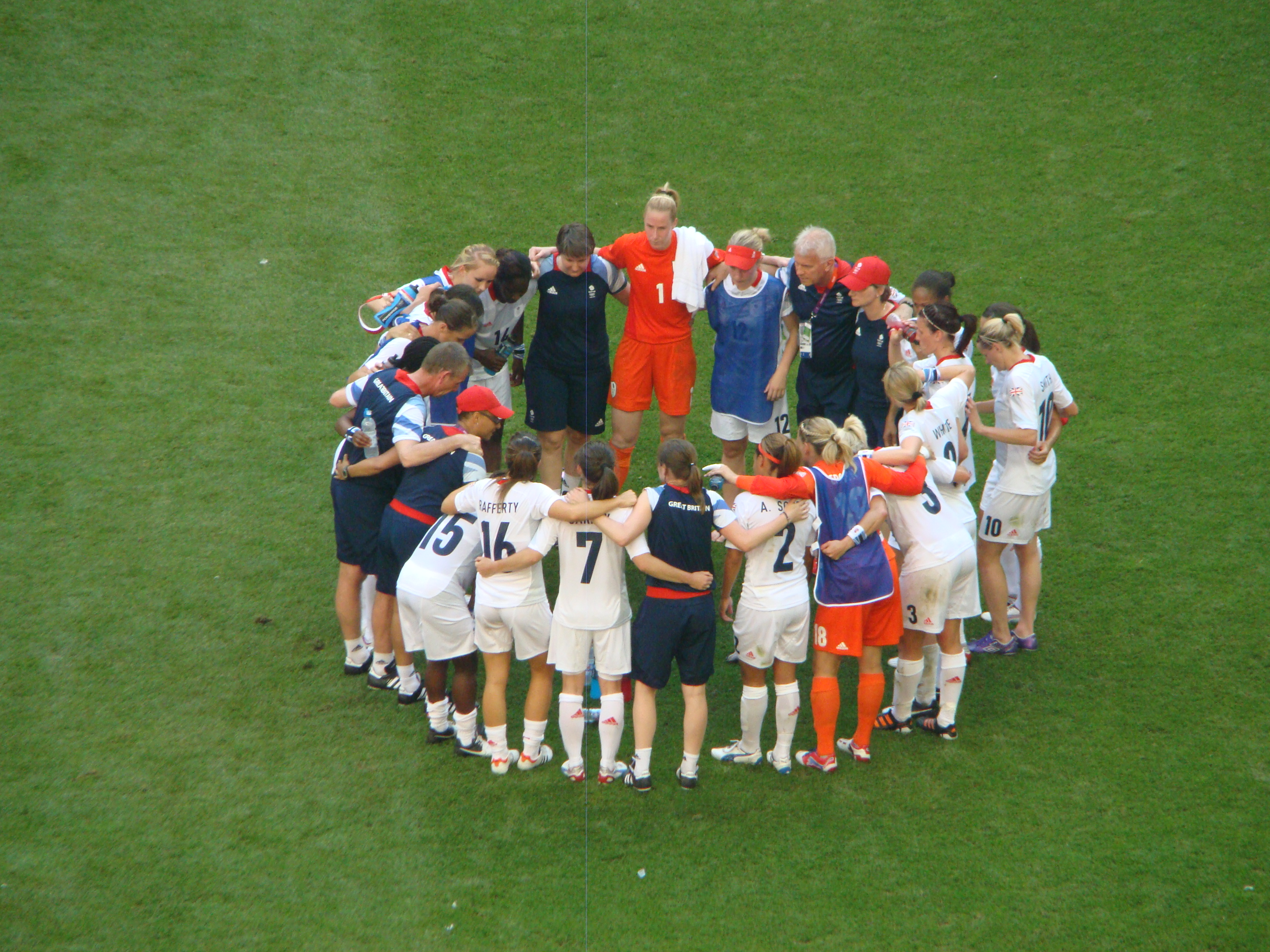

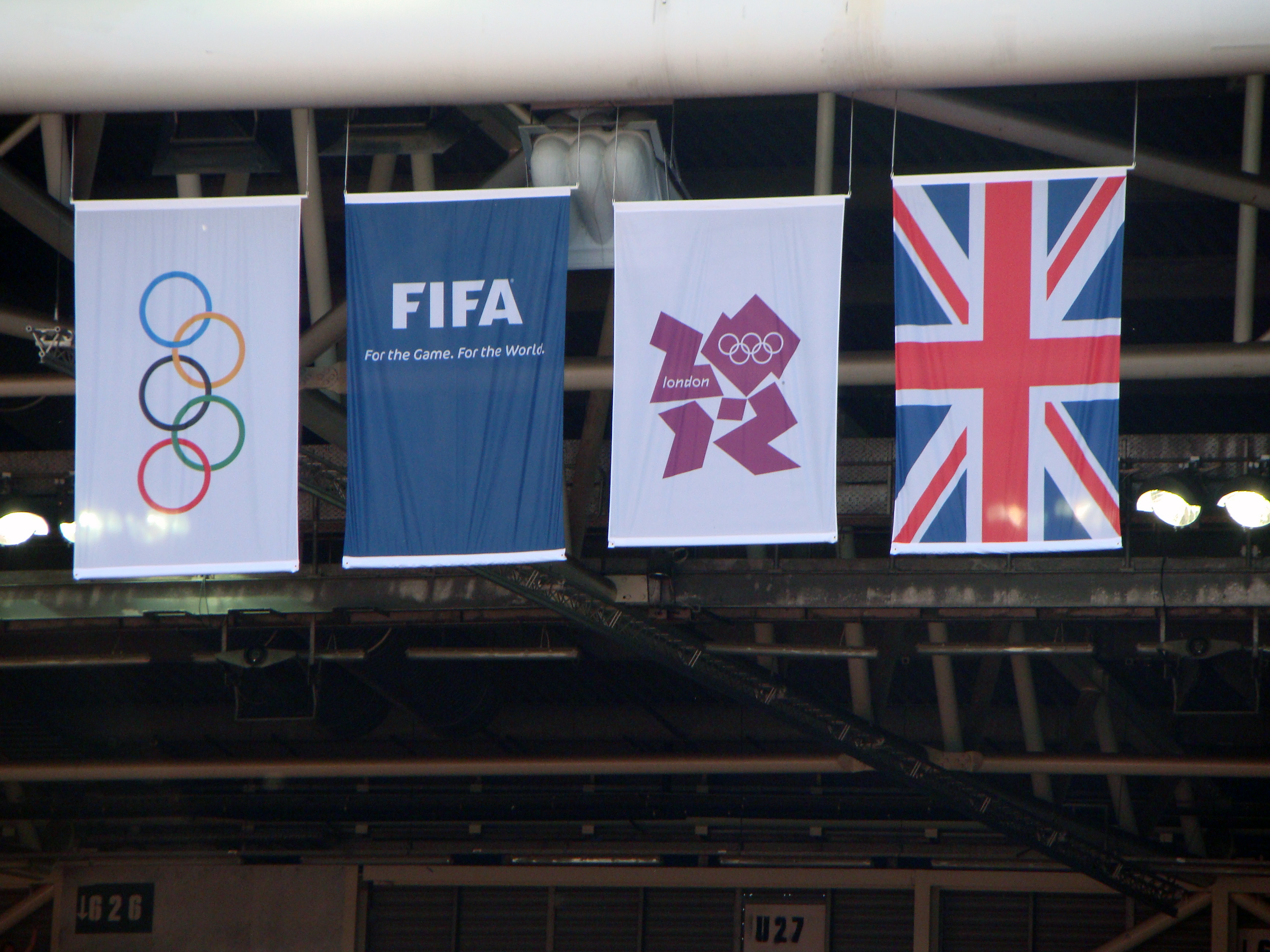

== Cameroon vs Brazil ==
25 July 2012
18:45

Cameroon	0–5	Brazil
	Report	Francielle 7'; Costa 10'; Marta 73' (pen.), 88'; Cristiane 78'

Millennium Stadium, Cardiff
Attendance: 30,847
Referee: Jenny Palmqvist (Sweden)

Cameroon	Brazil

GK	1	Annette Ngo Ndom
DF	2	Christine Manie	(yellow card) 6'
DF	5	Augustine Ejangue
DF	13	Claudine Meffometou
MF	12	Francoise Bella (c)
MF	16	Jeanette Yango	(yellow card) 61'
FW	3	Njoya Nkout		(substituted off) 64'
FW	7	Gabrielle Onguene
FW	8	Raissa Feudjio		(substituted off) 71'
FW	9	Madeleine Ngono Mani
FW	10	Bebey Beyene
Substitutions:
MF	6	Francine Zouga		(substituted on) 64'
FW	17	Gaelle Enganamouit		(substituted on) 71'
Manager:
Carl Enow

GK	1	Andréia
DF	5	Érika
DF	6	Maurine
DF	16	Renata Costa
MF	7	Ester
MF	8	Formiga	(yellow card) 75'	(substituted off) 81'
MF	13	Francielle		(substituted off) 90+2'
MF	14	Bruna
FW	2	Fabiana
FW	9	Thaís Guedes		(substituted off) 46'
FW	10	Marta (c)
Substitutions:
FW	11	Cristiane		(substituted on) 46'
FW	17	Grazielle		(substituted on) 81'
DF	17	Daiane		(substituted on) 90+2'
Manager:
Jorge Barcellos

Assistant referees:
Helen Karo (Sweden)
Anna Nyström (Sweden)
Fourth official:
Christina Pedersen (Norway)

== New Zealand vs Brazil ==
28 July 2012
14:30

New Zealand	0–1	Brazil
	Report	Cristiane 86'

Millennium Stadium, Cardiff
Attendance: 30,103
Referee: Bibiana Steinhaus (Germany)

New Zealand	Brazil

GK	1	Jenny Bindon
DF	2	Ria Percival
DF	4	Katie Hoyle	(yellow card) 85'
DF	5	Abby Erceg
DF	6	Rebecca Smith (c)
DF	7	Ali Riley
MF	8	Hayley Moorwood		(substituted off) 77'
MF	12	Betsy Hassett		(substituted off) 87'
FW	9	Amber Hearn
FW	10	Sarah Gregorius
FW	17	Hannah Wilkinson	(yellow card) 75'	(substituted off) 81'
Substitutions:
MF	11	Kirsty Yallop		(substituted on) 77'
FW	13	Rosie White		(substituted on) 81'
MF	16	Annalie Longo		(substituted on) 87'
Manager:
(United Kingdom) Tony Readings

GK	1	Andréia	(yellow card) 90+3'
DF	5	Érika
DF	6	Maurine
DF	16	Renata Costa
MF	7	Ester
MF	8	Formiga
MF	13	Francielle		(substituted off) 58'
MF	14	Bruna
FW	2	Fabiana		(substituted off) 88'
FW	10	Marta (c)
FW	11	Cristiane
Substitutions:
FW	9	Thaís Guedes		(substituted on) 58'
DF	3	Daiane		(substituted on) 88'
Manager:
Jorge Barcellos

Assistant referees:
Marina Wozniak (Germany)
Katrin Rafalski (Germany)
Fourth official:
Carol Anne Chenard (Canada)

== Great Britain vs Cameroon ==
28 July 2012
17:15

Great Britain	3–0	Cameroon
Stoney 18'; J. Scott 23'; Houghton 82'	Report

Millennium Stadium, Cardiff
Attendance: 31,141
Referee: Hong Eun-ah (South Korea)

Great Britain	Cameroon

GK	1	Karen Bardsley
DF	2	Alex Scott
DF	3	Steph Houghton
DF	6	Casey Stoney (c)
DF	13	Ifeoma Dieke	(substituted off) 68'
MF	4	Jill Scott
MF	12	Kim Little
MF	14	Anita Asante	(substituted off) 60'
FW	7	Karen Carney
FW	10	Kelly Smith	(substituted off) 46'
FW	15	Eniola Aluko
Substitutions:
FW	11	Rachel Yankey	(substituted on) 46'
MF	8	Fara Williams	(substituted on) 60'
DF	5	Sophie Bradley	(substituted on) 68'
Manager:
Hope Powell

GK	1	Annette Ngo Ndom
DF	2	Christine Manie	(yellow card) 17'
DF	5	Augustine Ejangue
DF	13	Claudine Meffometou
MF	6	Francine Zouga
MF	12	Francoise Bella (c)
MF	16	Jeanette Yango		(substituted off) 62'
FW	7	Gabrielle Onguene
FW	9	Madeleine Ngono Mani		(substituted off) 79'
FW	10	Bebey Beyene		(substituted off) 33'
FW	11	Adrienne Iven
Substitutions:
DF	14	Bibi Medoua	(yellow card) 36'	(substituted on) 33'
FW	3	Ajara Nchout		(substituted on) 62'
FW	17	Gaelle Enganamouit		(substituted on) 79'
Manager:
Carl Enow

Assistant referees:
Sarah Ho (Australia)
Kim Kyoung-Min (South Korea)
Fourth official:
Sachiko Yamaguchi (Japan)

== New Zealand vs Cameroon ==
31 July 2012
19:45

New Zealand	3–1	Cameroon
Smith 43'; Sonkeng 49' (o.g.); Gregorius 62'	Report	Onguéné 75'

City of Coventry Stadium, Coventry
Attendance: 11,425
Referee: Christina Pedersen (Norway)

New Zealand	Cameroon

GK	1	Jenny Bindon
DF	2	Ria Percival
DF	4	Katie Hoyle
DF	5	Abby Erceg
DF	6	Rebecca Smith (c)
DF	7	Ali Riley
MF	12	Betsy Hassett
MF	16	Annalie Longo	(substituted off) 82'
FW	9	Amber Hearn
FW	10	Sarah Gregorius	(substituted off) 65'
FW	13	Rosie White
Substitutions:
MF	8	Hayley Moorwood	(substituted on) 65'
MF	11	Kirsty Yallop	(substituted on) 82'
Manager:
(United Kingdom) Tony Readings

GK	1	Annette Ngo Ndom
DF	5	Augustine Ejangue	(yellow card) 51'
DF	14	Bibi Medoua	(yellow card) 21'
DF	15	Ysis Sonkeng
MF	4	Yvonne Chibosso
MF	6	Francine Zouga		(substituted off) 78'
MF	12	Francoise Bella (c)		(substituted off) 58'
FW	3	Njoya Nkout		(substituted off) 46'
FW	7	Gabrielle Onguéné
FW	8	Raissa Feudjio
FW	11	Adrienne Iven
Substitutions:
FW	9	Madeleine Ngono Mani		(substituted on) 46'
MF	16	Jeannette Yango	(yellow card) 76'	(substituted on) 58'
FW	17	Gaelle Enganamouit		(substituted on) 78'
Manager:
Carl Enow

Assistant referees:
Hege Steinlund (Norway)
Lada Rojc (Croatia)
Fourth official:
Kirsi Heikkinen (Finland)

== Great Britain vs Brazil ==
31 July 2012
19:45

Great Britain	1–0	Brazil
Houghton 2'	Report

Wembley Stadium, London
Attendance: 70,584
Referee: Carol Anne Chenard (Canada)

Great Britain	Brazil

GK	1	Karen Bardsley
DF	2	Alex Scott
DF	3	Steph Houghton
DF	5	Sophie Bradley
DF	6	Casey Stoney (c)
MF	4	Jill Scott
MF	12	Kim Little
MF	14	Anita Asante
FW	7	Karen Carney	(substituted off) 84'
FW	10	Kelly Smith	(substituted off) 85'
FW	15	Eniola Aluko	(substituted off) 63'
Substitutions:
FW	11	Rachel Yankey	(substituted on) 63'
MF	8	Fara Williams	(substituted on) 84'
FW	9	Ellen White	(substituted on) 85'
Manager:
Hope Powell

GK	1	Andréia
DF	5	Érika
DF	6	Maurine		(substituted off) 46'
DF	16	Renata Costa
MF	7	Ester		(substituted off) 72'
MF	12	Rosana
MF	13	Francielle	(yellow card) 56'
MF	14	Bruna	(yellow card) 32'	(substituted off) 46'
FW	9	Thaís Guedes
FW	10	Marta (c)
FW	11	Cristiane
Substitutions:
DF	3	Daiane		(substituted on) 46'
DF	4	Aline	(yellow card) 68'	(substituted on) 46'
FW	17	Grazielle		(substituted on) 72'
Manager:
Jorge Barcellos

Assistant referees:
Marie-Josée Charbonneau (Canada)
Stacy Greyson (Jamaica)
Fourth official:
Sachiko Yamaguchi (Japan)
