= Nina Ngueleu =

Cameroonian footballer

Nina Soufiya Ngueleu
Personal information
- Full name: Nina Soufiya Ngueleu
- Date of birth: December 11, 2004 (age 21)
- Place of birth: Yaoundé, Cameroon
- Position: Striker

Team information
- Current team: Montpellier HSC
- Number: 21

Youth career
- Paris Saint-Germain FC

Senior career*
Years	Team	Apps	(Gls)
2021–2023	Paris Saint-Germain FC	8	(0)
2023–	Montpellier HSC	42	(6)

International career
	Cameroon U-20		(1)
	Cameroon	4	(2)
Medal record
Women's Africa Cup of Nations
Gold medal – first place	2026 Morocco
- * Club domestic league appearances and goals

Nina Soufiya Ngueleu (born 11 December 2004 in Yaoundé) is a Cameroonian professional footballer who plays as a striker for Première Ligue club Montpellier HSC and the Cameroon national team. She began her youth career with Paris Saint-Germain.

== Biography ==
Soufiya Nina Ngueleu was born on 11 December 2004 in Cameroon. She grew up in Ngalland, a town in Mbalmayo, where she began playing football as a child after receiving footballs as gifts from her father during the Christmas holidays.

Ngueleu began her youth career with Paris Saint-Germain academy, where she made 18 appearances and scored 15 goals between 2020 and 2022. And made 8 appearance for Paris Saint-Germain.

She signed her first professional contract with Montpellier HSC in 2023.

=== International career ===
Ngueleu was selected for the Cameroon national under-20 women's team at the 2024 FIFA U-20 Women's World Cup in Colombia. She made four appearances during the tournament, including against Mexico, and wore the number 18 shirt for Cameroon.

She received her first call-up to the Cameroon senior women's national team in January 2023 for the 2023 FIFA Women's World Cup inter-confederation play-offs. She was later included in Cameroon's squad for the 2026 Women's Africa Cup of Nations in Morocco, where Cameroon won the tournament.

== Career statistics ==
=== Club ===
As of match played 25 April 2026

Appearances and goals by club, season and competition
Club	Season	League			FA cup		Total	
Club	Season	Division	Apps	Goals	Apps	Goals	Apps	Goals
Paris Saint-Germain	2021–22	Division 1 Féminine	1	0	0	0	1	0
Paris Saint-Germain	2022–23	Division 1 Féminine	5	0	0	0	5	0
Montpellier	2023–24	Division 1 Féminine	20	1	1	0	21	1
Montpellier	2024–25	Première Ligue	22	4	2	1	24	5
Montpellier	2025–26	Première Ligue	21	1	1	0	22	1
Career total			69	6	4	1	73	7

=== International ===
As of match played 16 August 2026

Appearances and goals by national team and year
National team	Year	Apps	Goals
Cameroon	2026	4	2
Total		4	2

== Honours ==
Cameroon

- Women's Africa Cup of Nations: 2026
