= Bibi Medoua =

Cameroonian footballer (born 1993)

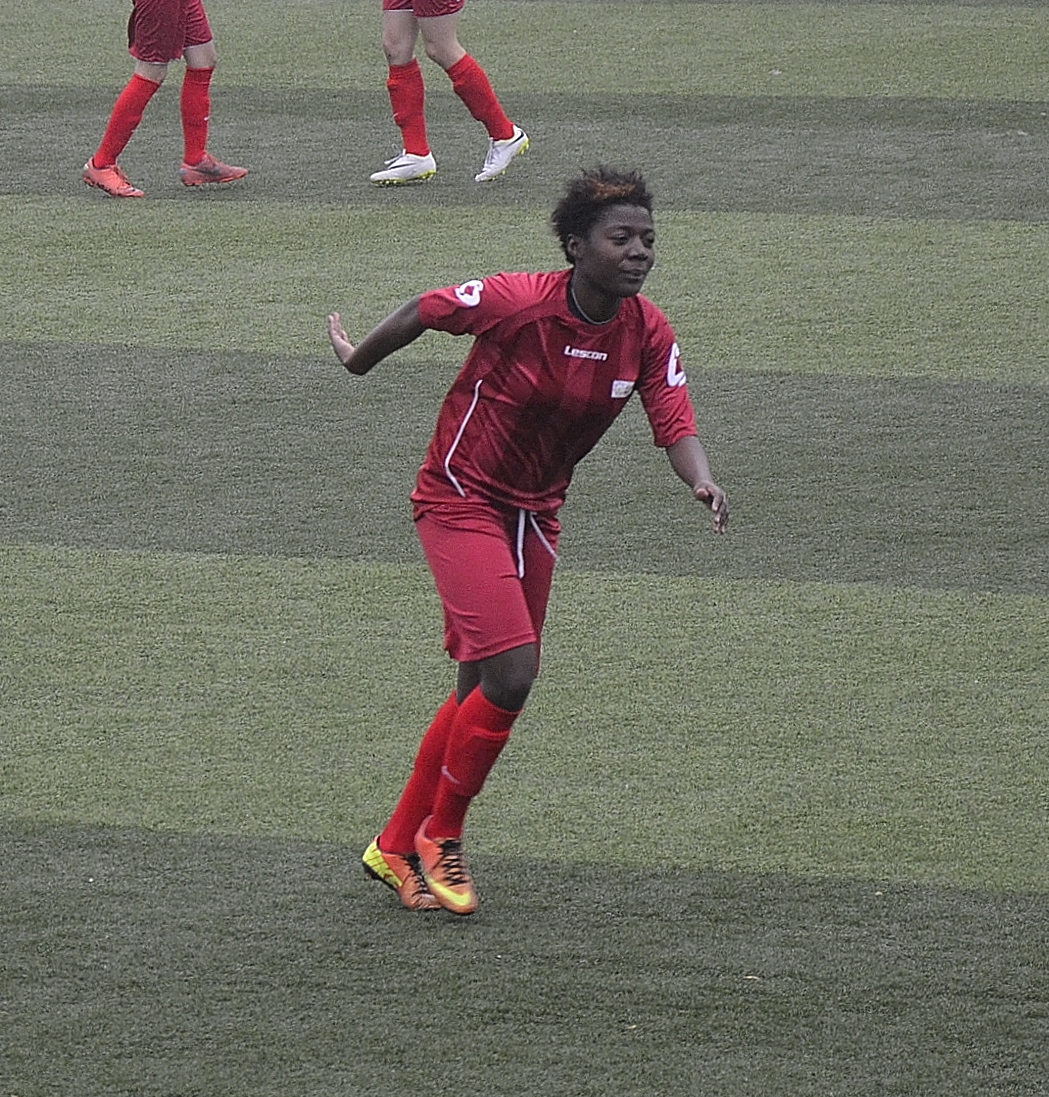
- Bibi Medoua playing for Ataşehir Belediyespor in the 2013-14 season.

Personal information
- Full name: Bibi Balbine Laure Medoua
- Date of birth: 9 August 1993 (age 33)
- Place of birth: Yaoundé, Cameroon
- Height: 1.64 m (5 ft 4 1/2 in)
- Position: Defender

Senior career*
Years	Team	Apps	(Gls)
2013–2014	Trabzon İdmanocağı	5	(0)
2014	Ataşehir Belediyespor	6	(1)

International career
- Cameroon
- * Club domestic league appearances and goals as of April 24, 2014

Bibi Medoua (born Bibi Balbine Laure Medoua on 9 August 1993) is a Cameroonian football defender. She played for Ataşehir Belediyespor in the Turkish Women's First Football League. She is a member of the Cameroonian national team, with which she has played the 2012 Summer Olympics.

Before she transferred to Ataşehir Belediyespor in Istanbul on 14 February 2014, she played for Trabzon İdmanocağı in the first half of the 2013–2014 season.
