= Great Britain women's Olympic football team =

Great Britain
- Association: The FA
- Captain: Steph Houghton; Sophie Ingle; Kim Little (2020)
- Most caps: Kim Little (9); Jill Scott (9)
- Top scorer: Ellen White (6)
- FIFA code: GBR
First colours	Second colours

First international
- Great Britain 0–0 Sweden (Middlesbrough, United Kingdom; 20 July 2012)

Biggest win
- Great Britain 3–0 Cameroon (Cardiff, United Kingdom; 28 July 2012)

Biggest defeat
- Great Britain 3–4 Australia ( Kashima, Japan; 30 July 2021)

Olympic Games
- Appearances: 2 (first in 2012)
- Best result: Quarter-finals (2012, 2020)

The Great Britain women's Olympic football team (also known as Team GB; or occasionally Great Britain and Northern Ireland) represent the United Kingdom in the women's football tournament at the Olympic Games. Normally, no team represents the whole of the United Kingdom in women's football, as separate teams represent England, Scotland, Wales and Northern Ireland.

Women's football was introduced to the Olympic Games in 1996, but Great Britain did not enter the football events at this time. This changed when the 2012 Summer Olympics were hosted by London, as an Olympic football team was created to take the automatic qualifying place of the host nation. Following an agreement between the British Olympic Association (BOA) and The Football Association (FA), which operates the England team, the FA selected the British team, which could include players from across the United Kingdom. The team reached the quarter-finals, losing to Canada.

FIFA stated that they would not allow entry of a British team in future Olympics unless all four Home Nations agreed. No agreement was reached ahead of the 2016 Summer Olympics, but a deal was formed for the 2020 tournament. Great Britain qualified for that tournament, as England secured one of the top three places among European teams at the 2019 World Cup. For the 2024 tournament, Great Britain did not qualify, as England were unable to secure qualification via the 2023–24 Nations League.

== History ==
=== Background ===
When the Football Association (FA) was formed in 1863, its geographical remit was not clear: there was no specification of whether it covered just England, the entire UK or even the entire world. The question was answered when the Scottish Football Association (SFA) was founded in 1873. Football associations for Wales and Ireland (later Northern Ireland) were founded in 1876 and 1880 respectively. Football therefore developed with separate national teams representing each of the countries of the United Kingdom and no 'United Kingdom football association' was ever formed. A Great Britain Olympic football team was selected by the FA for men's Olympic football between 1908 and 1972, for amateur players, but the UK had stopped entering teams into the Olympic football tournament by the time of the first women's football competition in 1996 due to The FA abolishing the distinction between amateurism and professionalism in 1972.

=== London 2012 ===
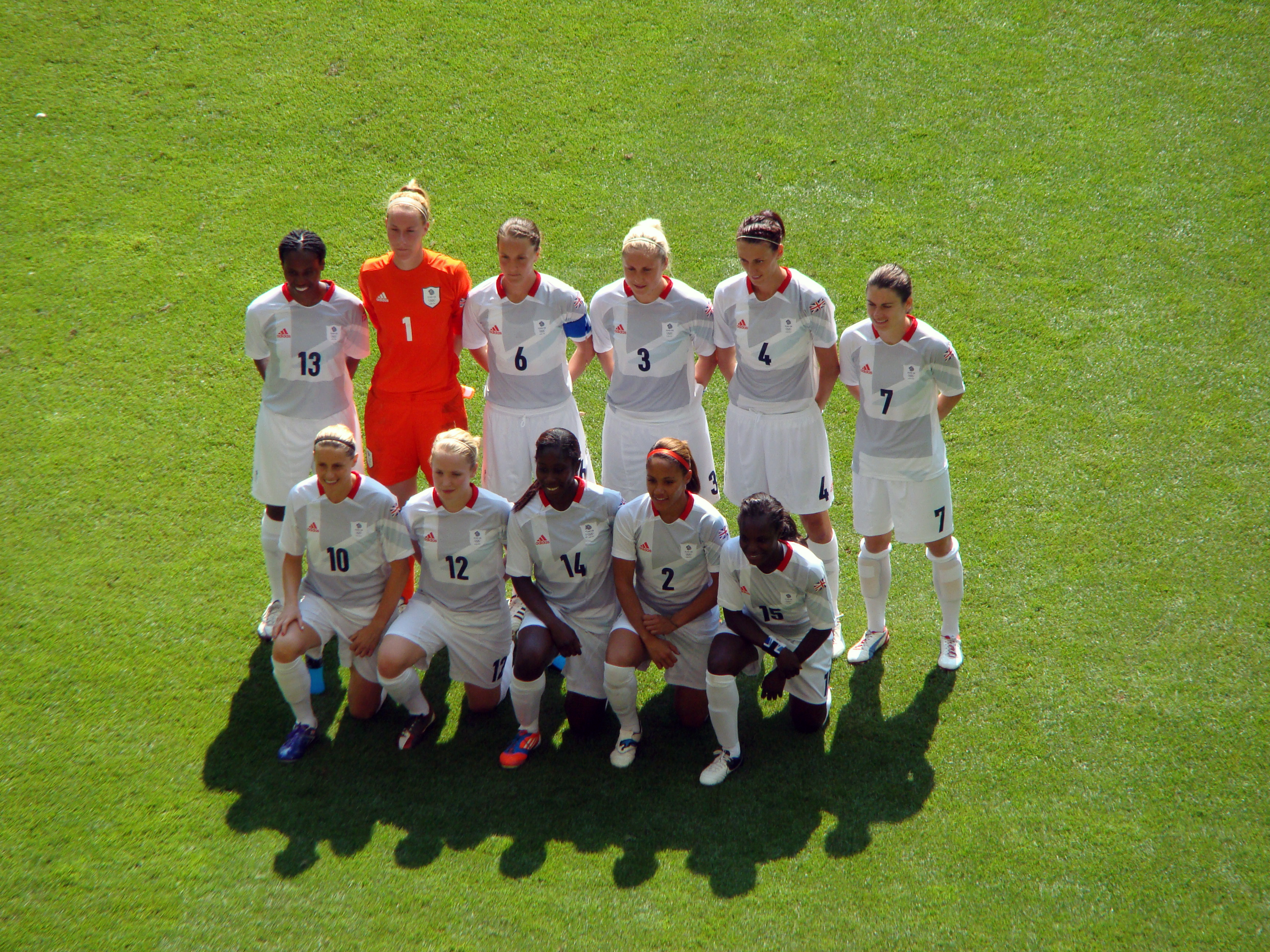
The Great Britain team before their first match in the Olympic tournament of 2012

Due to London's successful bid for the 2012 Summer Olympics, the United Kingdom had the right to enter a team in the football tournament as host nation. The British Olympic Association stated it would enter a football team, but the Scottish Football Association (SFA) refused even to attend meetings at which the Home Nations were to discuss the possibility and the Football Association of Wales withdrew from the negotiations. In October 2007 the Irish Football Association (the association for Northern Ireland) also announced that they would not take part in a unified team, leaving the Football Association (England) as the only association willing to take part. It was reported that the other associations feared the loss of their privileged voting position within the International Football Association Board.

As England had reached the quarter-finals of the 2007 FIFA Women's World Cup, Great Britain had qualified for the 2008 Summer Olympics. They were unable to participate in the Games as the national football associations failed to reach an agreement, and they were replaced in the tournament by Sweden. Nevertheless, the BOA decided that a women's team would compete in London 2012.

Following an initial announcement in May 2009 of a compromise, in which the FA would select a team of only English players to compete at London, an FA statement in June 2011 claimed that after discussions with all British football associations and the BOA that they would enter a team selected from across the United Kingdom. That announcement angered the other British football associations, who claimed not to have been consulted on the decision, but the SFA admitted that it would have no grounds for preventing Scottish players from competing in the team. In November 2011 the Professional Footballers' Association warned the SFA, FAW and IFA against trying to "intimidate" players into not taking part.

In June 2011 Arsenal Ladies striker Julie Fleeting, Scotland's record goalscorer, ruled herself out of contention. She concurred with the opinion of her father Jim—the SFA's director of football development—that participation may "jeopardise" the Scottish national team. Fleeting's teammate for club and country Kim Little took the opposite view: "I don't see why anyone would want to stop a player from playing at a massive tournament like the Olympics, it's the biggest sporting event ever. If I get the opportunity I'll grab it with both hands – I would definitely play." Fellow Scots Rachel Corsie and Jen Beattie also expressed interest, as well as Everton's Welsh winger Gwennan Harries.

In October 2011, England manager Hope Powell was appointed head coach of the women's team. Powell began the process of selecting the squad by writing to all the players whom she wanted to consider for the team, offering them the opportunity to exclude themselves from consideration for the squad. It was confirmed in January 2012 that none of the players who had been contacted had asked to withdraw. In June 2012 The Belfast Telegraph reported that three Northern Ireland players had been selected in the final squad. One of the players concerned, Sunderland's Sarah McFadden, dismissed the report: "I haven't received anything about being in final squad... Wish it was true but unfortunately not."

==== Results ====
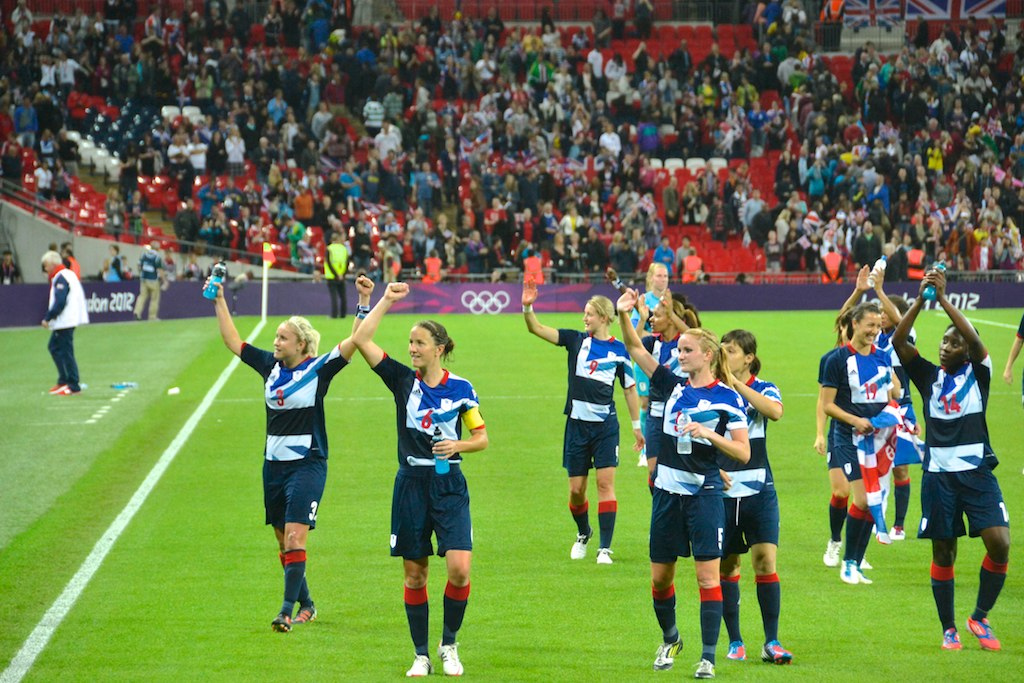
Team GB celebrating following victory against Brazil in their final group game

Great Britain were placed in Group E for the Olympic tournament prior to the draw, with their first two matches due to be played at the Millennium Stadium in Cardiff. The draw was held on 24 April 2012 and added New Zealand, Cameroon and Brazil to Great Britain's group. Two days after the draw, it was announced that Great Britain's single warm-up game prior to the start of the tournament would be against Sweden at the Riverside Stadium, Middlesbrough on 20 July.

The first ever game for the Great Britain women's Olympic football team was a behind closed doors training match win against South Africa, part of the preparations for the 2012 Summer Olympics. It took place in Birmingham, England on 15 July 2012. The first official game was a goalless draw against Sweden on 20 July.

Friendlies

15 July 2012 Training match	Great Britain	3–1	South Africa	Birmingham, England
		Report		Attendance: 0 (behind closed doors)
Note: Unofficial match, no caps awarded

20 July 2012 Friendly	Great Britain	0–0	Sweden	Middlesbrough, England
16:00 BST (UTC+1)		Report		Stadium: Riverside Stadium; Referee: Florence Guillemin (France)

Group stage

Pos	Team	Pld	W	D	L	GF	GA	GD	Pts	Qualification
1	Great Britain	3	3	0	0	5	0	+5	9	Qualified for the quarter-finals
2	Brazil	3	2	0	1	6	1	+5	6	Qualified for the quarter-finals
3	New Zealand	3	1	0	2	3	3	0	3	Qualified for the quarter-finals
4	Cameroon	3	0	0	3	1	11	−10	0	

Source: IOC

25 July 2012 Group stage	Great Britain	1–0	New Zealand	Cardiff, Wales
16:00 BST (UTC+1)	Houghton 64'	Report		Stadium: Millennium Stadium; Attendance: 24,445; Referee: Kari Seitz (United States)

28 July 2012 Group stage	Great Britain	3–0	Cameroon	Cardiff, Wales
17:15 BST (UTC+1)	Stoney 18'; J. Scott 23'; Houghton 82'	Report		Stadium: Millennium Stadium; Attendance: 31,141; Referee: Hong Eun-ah (South Korea)

31 July 2012 Group stage	Great Britain	1–0	Brazil	London, England
19:45 BST (UTC+1)	Houghton 2'	Report		Stadium: Wembley Stadium; Attendance: 70,584; Referee: Carol Anne Chenard (Canada)

Knockout stage

3 August 2012 Quarter-final	Great Britain	0–2	Canada	Coventry, England
19:30 BST (UTC+1)		Report	Filigno 12'; Sinclair 26'	Stadium: City of Coventry Stadium; Attendance: 28,828; Referee: Sachiko Yamagishi (Japan)

=== Rio 2016 ===
After the team was eliminated from the 2012 Olympics, head coach Hope Powell expressed her wish that a team would be entered in future Olympic tournaments. In June 2013, while giving evidence to the House of Lords' Olympic and Paralympic Legacy Committee, the Football Association indicated that they would be prepared to run women's teams at future Olympic tournaments subject to one of the home nations meeting the qualification criteria (i.e. being one of the top three European nations at the Women's World Cup). However, following strong objections from the Scottish, Welsh and Northern Irish football associations, and a commitment from FIFA that they would not allow entry of a British team unless all four Home Nations agreed, the Football Association announced on 30 March 2015 that they would not seek entry into the 2016 Summer Olympics tournament. The third-place finish England secured at the 2015 FIFA Women's World Cup would have qualified Great Britain for the Olympics.

=== Tokyo 2020 ===
In June 2015, British Olympic Association chief Bill Sweeney announced a campaign to get the team reinstated for the 2020 Summer Olympics in Tokyo. In 2018, Baroness Campbell, the FA's Head of Women's Football, indicated that there was a willingness on the part of the other three Home Nations to allow the Football Association the opportunity to run a football team for the 2020 Olympics. An agreement was reached between the four associations ahead of the 2020 Summer Olympics that the highest ranked of the four home nations would be nominated to compete for the Olympic place. As a consequence, although both England and Scotland qualified for the 2019 World Cup (which is used by UEFA as the qualifying tournament for the Summer Olympics), only England were eligible to compete for an Olympic qualifying place. By reaching the semi-finals of the World Cup, England secured one of the three qualifying places allocated to UEFA.

Having originally announced that England manager Phil Neville would be appointed manager of Team GB Women for the 2020 Summer Olympics following England's successful de facto qualification performance at the 2019 World Cup, the FA announced in March 2021 that Hege Riise, who had been appointed caretaker manager of England following Neville's premature departure earlier in the year, would be taking over the role.

==== Results ====
Due to the COVID-19 pandemic, the games were postponed to the summer of 2021. However, their official name remained 2020 Summer Olympics. Great Britain were placed in pot two for the group stage draw based on the FIFA seeding for England who qualified on behalf of Great Britain. The team was drawn into Group E with host nation Japan, Canada and Chile. They had originally arranged one friendly in Stoke against Zambia who were preparing to make their Olympic debut. However, COVID-19 travel restrictions prevented them from entering the country and they were forced to withdraw. While in Japan, Great Britain eventually managed to play a closed-doors training match a week prior to their opening group game, reportedly beating New Zealand 3–0 at the Todoroki Athletics Stadium on 14 July.

Friendlies

1 July 2021 Friendly	Great Britain	C–C	Zambia	Stoke-on-Trent, England
19:15 BST (UTC+1)				Stadium: Stoke City Ground
Note: Zambia withdrew as the United Kingdom's COVID-19 travel restrictions prevented them from entering the country.

14 July 2021 Training match	Great Britain	3–0	New Zealand	Tokyo, Japan
	White; Parris	Report		Stadium: Todoroki Athletics Stadium; Attendance: 0 (behind closed doors)
Note: Unofficial match, no caps awarded

Group stage

Pos	Team	Pld	W	D	L	GF	GA	GD	Pts	Qualification
1	Great Britain	3	2	1	0	4	1	+3	7	Advance to knockout stage
2	Canada	3	1	2	0	4	3	+1	5	Advance to knockout stage
3	Japan (H)	3	1	1	1	2	2	0	4	Advance to knockout stage
4	Chile	3	0	0	3	1	5	−4	0	

Source: TOCOG and FIFA
(H) Hosts

21 July 2021 Group stage	Great Britain	2–0	Chile	Sapporo, Japan
16:30 JST (UTC+9)	White 18', 73'	Report		Stadium: Sapporo Dome; Attendance: 0 (behind closed doors); Referee: Salima Mukansanga (Rwanda)

24 July 2021 Group stage	Japan	0–1	Great Britain	Sapporo, Japan
19:30 JST (UTC+9)		Report	White 74'	Stadium: Sapporo Dome; Attendance: 0 (behind closed doors); Referee: Anastasia Pustovoitova (Russia)

27 July 2021 Group stage	Canada	1–1	Great Britain	Kashima, Japan
20:00 JST (UTC+9)	Leon 55'	Report	Price 85' (o.g.)	Stadium: Kashima Stadium; Attendance: 0 (behind closed doors); Referee: Kateryna Monzul (Ukraine)

Knockout stage

30 July 2021 Quarter-final	Great Britain	3–4 (a.e.t.)	Australia	Kashima, Japan
18:00 JST (UTC+9)	White 57', 66', 115'	Report	Kennedy 35'; Kerr 89', 106'; Fowler 103'	Stadium: Kashima Stadium; Attendance: 0 (behind closed doors); Referee: Salima Mukansanga (Rwanda)

=== Paris 2024 ===
As with 2020, England (as the highest ranked home nation) were made responsible for Great Britain's qualification for the Olympics. Unlike 2020, European qualification was not based on the World Cup (in which England finished runners-up) but on the inaugural edition of the Nations League. England and Scotland were drawn in the same Nations League group, which created a potential conflict of interest for the Scottish players. On 20 September 2023, England manager Sarina Wiegman was announced as manager of Team GB assuming qualification for the tournament. Team GB were eliminated from qualifying contention after England finished as runners-up to the Netherlands on goal difference in the Nations League group.

== Team image ==
=== Crest ===
The IOC governing body prohibits the use of any crests attributed to specific football associations or federations as they are seen to represent separate commercial interests rather than the nations. Where teams would normally use association crests they instead use the emblems of their respective national Olympic associations. Great Britain women's Olympic football team wears the logo of Team GB. The crest features the head of a lion, a traditional animal in British heraldry that forms part of the Royal coat of arms. The lion's blue and red mane is stylised to create a Union Jack. Beneath the lion is the Team GB wordmark which was developed in 1996 as a way of better unifying British athletes from all sports under one clearly defined sporting brand. Below the wordmark are the Olympic rings.

=== Kits ===
Both the 2012 and 2020 kits were supplied by Adidas, the licensed sportswear partners of Team GB since 1984. They are part of the larger collection of uniforms designed for British athletes across all sports for each individual Olympics. Stella McCartney designed the 2012 range. Adidas' in-house design team created the 2020 kits.

==== London 2012 ====
1st Colours	2nd Colours

==== Tokyo 2020 ====
1st Colours	2nd Colours

== Players ==
=== 2020 Olympics squad ===
- The following players were named in the squad for the 2020 Summer Olympics. The squad, consisting of 19 English, one Welsh and two Scottish players, was originally announced on 27 May 2021 and included five players (Karen Bardsley, Steph Houghton, Kim Little, Jill Scott and Ellen White) from the 2012 tournament. On 18 June 2021, Carly Telford was called up to replace the injured Karen Bardsley before the start of the tournament.
- On 1 July 2021, the IOC and FIFA confirmed rosters would be expanded from 18 to 22 meaning the four reserve players (Sandy MacIver, Lotte Wubben-Moy, Niamh Charles and Ella Toone) would be available for selection to the matchday squad.
- Caps and goals updated as of 30 July 2021.

Head coach: (Norway) Hege Riise

No.	Pos.	Player	Date of birth (age)	Caps	Goals	Club
1	GK	(England) Ellie Roebuck	23 September 1999 (aged 21)	4	0	(The Football Association) Manchester City
13	GK	(England) Carly Telford	7 July 1987 (aged 34)	0	0	(The Football Association) Chelsea
22	GK	(England) Sandy MacIver	18 June 1998 (aged 23)	0	0	(The Football Association) Everton
2	DF	(England) Lucy Bronze	28 October 1991 (aged 29)	4	0	(The Football Association) Manchester City
3	DF	(England) Demi Stokes	12 December 1991 (aged 29)	3	0	(The Football Association) Manchester City
5	DF	(England) Steph Houghton (co-captain)	23 April 1988 (aged 33)	8	3	(The Football Association) Manchester City
12	DF	(England) Rachel Daly	6 December 1991 (aged 29)	4	0	(United States Soccer Federation) Houston Dash
14	DF	(England) Millie Bright	21 August 1993 (aged 27)	3	0	(The Football Association) Chelsea
16	DF	(England) Leah Williamson	29 March 1997 (aged 24)	3	0	(The Football Association) Arsenal
21	DF	(England) Lotte Wubben-Moy	11 January 1999 (aged 22)	0	0	(The Football Association) Arsenal
4	MF	(England) Keira Walsh	8 April 1997 (aged 24)	3	0	(The Football Association) Manchester City
6	MF	(Wales) Sophie Ingle (co-captain)	2 September 1991 (aged 29)	4	0	(The Football Association) Chelsea
8	MF	(Scotland) Kim Little (co-captain)	29 June 1990 (aged 31)	9	0	(The Football Association) Arsenal
11	MF	(Scotland) Caroline Weir	20 June 1995 (aged 26)	4	0	(The Football Association) Manchester City
18	MF	(England) Jill Scott	2 February 1987 (aged 34)	9	1	(The Football Association) Manchester City
9	FW	(England) Ellen White	9 May 1989 (aged 32)	8	6	(The Football Association) Manchester City
7	FW	(England) Nikita Parris	10 March 1994 (aged 27)	4	0	(The Football Association) Arsenal
10	FW	(England) Fran Kirby	29 June 1993 (aged 28)	2	0	(The Football Association) Chelsea
15	FW	(England) Lauren Hemp	7 August 2000 (aged 20)	3	0	(The Football Association) Manchester City
17	FW	(England) Georgia Stanway	3 January 1999 (aged 22)	4	0	(The Football Association) Manchester City
19	FW	(England) Niamh Charles	21 June 1999 (aged 22)	0	0	(The Football Association) Chelsea
20	FW	(England) Ella Toone	2 September 1999 (aged 21)	1	0	(The Football Association) Manchester United

== Managerial history ==
Statistics correct as of match played 30 July 2021

Image	Manager	Olympic games	P	W	D	L	Win %	Results
	(England) Hope Powell	2012	5	3	1	1	60.00	London 2012 – Quarter-finals
	(Norway) Hege Riise	2020	4	2	1	1	50.00	Tokyo 2020 – Quarter-finals

== Records ==
=== Most capped players ===
#	Name	Olympic games	Caps	Goals
1	(Scotland) **Kim Little**	2012, 2020	9	0
1	(England) Jill Scott	2012, 2020	9	1
3	(England) Steph Houghton	2012, 2020	8	3
3	(England) Ellen White	2012, 2020	8	6
5	(England) Eniola Aluko	2012	5	0
5	(England) Anita Asante	2012	5	0
5	(England) Karen Bardsley	2012	5	0
5	(England) Karen Carney	2012	5	0
5	(England) Alex Scott	2012	5	0
5	(England) Casey Stoney	2012	5	1
5	(England) Fara Williams	2012	5	0
5	(England) Rachel Yankey	2012	5	0

Bold names denote a player still playing or available for selection.

=== Top goalscorers ===
#	Name	Olympic games	Caps	Goals	Average
1	(England) Ellen White (list)	2012, 2020	8	6	0.75
2	(England) Steph Houghton	2012, 2020	8	3	0.38
3	(England) Casey Stoney	2012	5	1	0.2
3	(England) Jill Scott	2012, 2020	9	1	0.11

Bold names denote a player still playing or available for selection.

== Summer Olympics record ==
Gold medalists
Silver medalists
Bronze medalists

Summer Olympics
Year	Host	Round	Pld	W	D	L	F	A	Squad
1996	United States	Did not enter							
2000	Australia	Did not enter							
2004	Greece	Did not enter							
2008	China	Did not enter							
2012	United Kingdom	Quarter-finals	4	3	0	1	5	2	Squad
2016	Brazil	Did not enter							
2020	Japan	Quarter-finals	4	2	1	1	7	5	Squad
2024	France	Did not qualify							
2028	USA	TBD							
Total		Quarter-finals	8	5	1	2	12	7	—

*Red border colour denotes tournament was held on home soil.

== See also ==
- Great Britain men's Olympic football team
- England women's national football team
- Northern Ireland women's national football team
- Scotland women's national football team
- Wales women's national football team
