= Carl Enow =

Cameroonian football manager

Personal information
- Full name: Carl Enow Ngachu
- Date of birth: 21 February 1975 (age 51)
- Place of birth: Manyu, Cameroon

Managerial career
- Years: Team
- 2003–2018: Cameroon Women

Carl Enow Ngachu (born 21 February 1975) is a Cameroonian football manager.

== Career ==
Enow was the head coach of the Cameroon women's national team at the 2012 Summer Olympics and 2015 FIFA Women's World Cup.
