= Francoise Bella =

Cameroonian footballer (born 1983)

Françoise Bella
Personal information
- Full name: Françoise Joséphine Bella
- Date of birth: 9 March 1983 (age 43)
- Place of birth: Cameroon
- Position: Midfielder

Senior career*
Years	Team	Apps	(Gls)
2012	Rivers Angels		

International career
2000–2012	Cameroon	53 (?)	(7)
- * Club domestic league appearances and goals

Françoise Joséphine Bella (born 9 March 1983) is a Cameroonian football midfielder who played for the Cameroon women's national football team at the 2012 Summer Olympics. On club level she played for Rivers Angels and Bayelsa Queens in Nigeria.

== See also ==
- Cameroon at the 2012 Summer Olympics
