= Gaëlle Enganamouit =

Cameroonian footballer

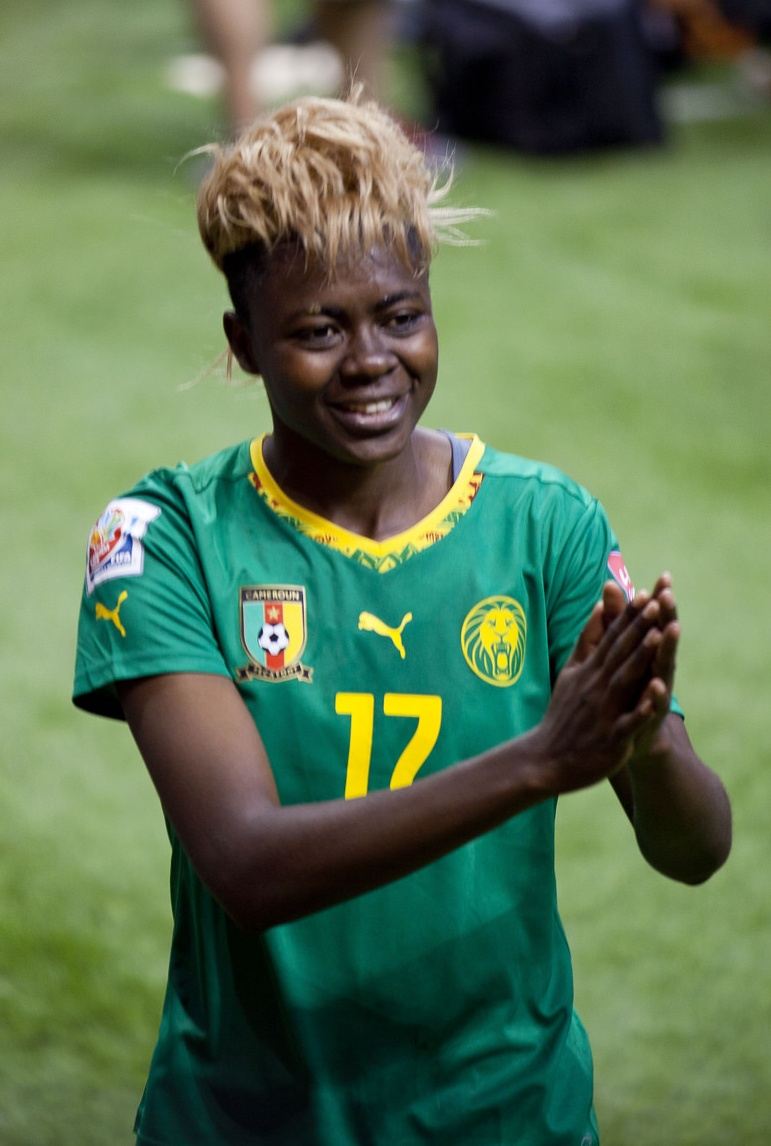
- Enganamouit playing for Cameroon at the 2015 FIFA Women's World Cup

Personal information
- Full name: Gaëlle Deborah Enganamouit
- Date of birth: 9 June 1992 (age 34)
- Place of birth: Yaoundé, Cameroon
- Height: 1.71 m (5 ft 7 in)
- Position: Forward

Senior career*
Years	Team	Apps	(Gls)
2009–2012	Lorema Yaoundé		
2012–2013	Spartak Subotica		
2014–2015	Eskilstuna United DFF	41	(24)
2016	FC Rosengård	4	(1)
2017–2018	Dalian Quanjian F.C.	0	(0)
2018	Avaldsnes	15	(4)
2019	Málaga	2	(0)

International career^{‡}
2010–2020	Cameroon	43	(5)
- * Club domestic league appearances and goals as of 5 May 2019 ‡ National team caps and goals as of 17:02, 23 June 2015 (UTC)

Gaëlle Deborah Enganamouit (born 9 June 1992) is a Cameroonian footballer who plays as a forward for the Cameroon women's national team.

== Club career ==
Enganamouit previously played in the Serbian First League for Spartak Subotica, for whom she appeared in the UEFA Champions League. While playing for Spartak Enganamouit reportedly scored the fastest goal in women's football history, after two seconds.

In December 2013, Enganamouit announced her transfer to Swedish football, with newly promoted Damallsvenskan team Eskilstuna United.

League champions FC Rosengård signed Enganamouit to a two-year contract in November 2015, as a replacement for Anja Mittag. Enganamouit had been the 2015 Damallsvenskan top goalscorer with 18 goals as Eskilstuna finished second after mounting an unlikely title challenge. She was nominated for the BBC Women's footballer of the year award in early 2016, alongside Amandine Henry, Kim Little, Carli Lloyd and Becky Sauerbrunn.

On the opening day of the season, Enganamouit suffered an anterior cruciate ligament injury which was expected to rule her out for the entire 2016 campaign.

On 11 February 2017, Dalian Quanjian F.C. officially signed Enganamouit.

== International career ==
She is a member of the Cameroonian national team and played at the 2012 Summer Olympics. She appeared in each game as a substitute; Cameroon lost each match.

At the 2015 Women's World Cup in Canada she scored a hat-trick in Cameroon's 6–0 win over Ecuador. During the 2015 World Cup game against defending champions Japan, her unnerving drive and powerful style lead to her being known as the "Freight Train" by Canadian fans.

On June 9, 2020, Gaëlle Enganamouit announced the end of her career.

== Honours ==
Individual

- Damallsvenskan top goal scorer: 2015
- African Women's Footballer of the Year: 2015
- IFFHS CAF Women's Team of the Decade: 2011–2020
- IFFHS All-time Africa Women's Dream Team: 2021

== See also ==
- List of FIFA Women's World Cup hat-tricks
