= Adrienne Iven =

Cameroonian footballer

Personal information
- Full name: Adrienne Iven Mihamle
- Date of birth: 9 March 1983 (age 43)
- Place of birth: Cameroon
- Height: 1.69 m (5 ft 6 1/2 in)
- Position: Striker

Team information
- Current team: Spartak Subotica
- Number: 9

Senior career*
Years	Team	Apps	(Gls)
- Canon Yaoundé
2011–2012	Louves Minproff		
2012–	Spartak Subotica		

International career
2007–	Cameroon		
- * Club domestic league appearances and goals

Adrienne Iven Mihamle (born 9 March 1983) is a Cameroonian football striker currently playing for in the Serbian First League for Spartak Subotica. As a member of the Cameroonian national team she played the 2012 Summer Olympics.
