= Madeleine Ngono Mani =

Cameroonian footballer

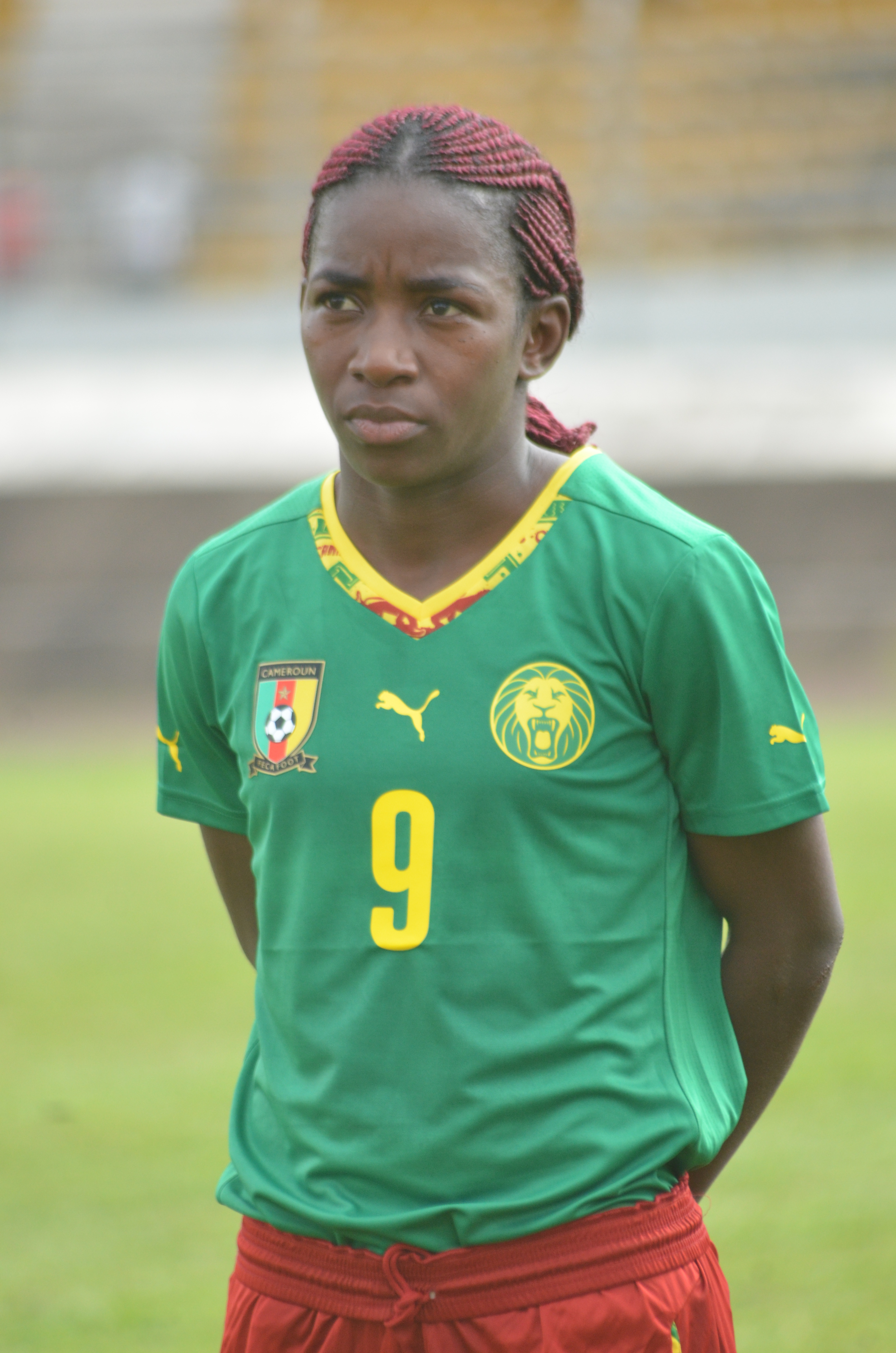

Personal information
- Full name: Madeleine Michèle Ngono Mani Epse Ongueme
- Date of birth: 16 October 1983 (age 43)
- Place of birth: Mvaa, Cameroon
- Height: 1.60 m (5 ft 3 in)
- Position: Forward

Team information
- Current team: Albi Croix

Senior career*
Years	Team	Apps	(Gls)
2003–2009	Saint-Étienne	54	(24)
2009–2011	Soyaux	28	(12)
2011	FCF Monteux	4	(0)
2011–2013	En Avant Guingamp	16	(9)
2013–2015	Claix		
2015–2016	FC Minsk		
2016–2017	Aurillac Arpajon		
2017–2018	Ambilly		
2018–2019	Albi Croix		
- Yverdon-Sport

International career^{‡}
2002–	Cameroon	109	(49)
- * Club domestic league appearances and goals ‡ National team caps and goals as of 23 June 2019 (UTC)

Madeleine Michèle Ngono Mani Epse Ongueme (born 16 October 1983), known as Madeleine Ngono Mani, is a Cameroonian football who plays as a striker. She is a member of the Cameroonian national team, with which she has played the 2012 Summer Olympics, the African Women's Championship, and the 2015 FIFA Women's World Cup.

== Career ==
=== Club ===
Her career started with Lorema FC and Canon Yaoundé, winning the domestic cup and league twice each in Cameroon . After the domestic success, she joined RC Saint-Étienne in 2003, then in the fourth tier of French football. The team merged with AS Saint-Étienne in 2009, after their exploits leading them to the top level of French football, in no small part due to Ngono Mani's goal-scoring abilities. She then joined ASJ Soyaux and became one of their leading goal scorers in the second division. She turned professional by joining Guingamp in 2011 following a brief spell with FCF Monteux. She moved to Claix in 2013 after a fruitful two years with Guingamp. In 2015, she transferred to FC Minsk, with quite lucrative terms.

For the 2016–17 she moved to Aurillac Arpajon, in the French second tier. In 2018 she plays for Albi Croix.

=== International ===
She debuted in the World Cup qualifier against South Africa in 2002, in a 2–1 loss. In the 2012 Summer Olympics in London, United Kingdom, she played all three matches of the group stage of the women's football tournament, but the team did not manage to gain a single point and failed to qualify for the following round. She played a key role in Cameroon's campaign in the 2015 FIFA Women's World Cup, scoring a header to complete a comeback win against Switzerland, as well as scoring in the 6–0 rout of Ecuador. She is also the top scorer of the national team.

== Honours ==
1. Ligue Rhône-Alpes de football: 2003–04
