= Francine Zouga =

Cameroonian footballer

Personal information
- Full name: Francine Estelle Zouga Edoa
- Date of birth: 9 November 1987 (age 39)
- Place of birth: Yaoundé, Cameroon
- Height: 1.57 m (5 ft 2 in)
- Position: Midfielder

Senior career*
Years	Team	Apps	(Gls)
2003–2007	Canon Yaoundé		
2007–2012	Louves Minproff		
2012–2013	FSG-Aire le Lignon		
2013–2014	CSHVSM		
2014–2015	Montpellier	2	(0)
2015	Servette		
2015	VGA Saint-Maur	9	(0)
2016-2019	Nancy		
2019-2021	ASPTT Albi		
2021-2022	Racing FC		

International career^{‡}
2012-2015	Cameroon	56	(5)
- * Club domestic league appearances and goals as of 16:22, 6 June 2015 (UTC) ‡ National team caps and goals as of 16:33, 23 June 2015 (UTC)

Francine Estelle Zouga Edoa (born 9 November 1987) is a Cameroonian footballer who plays as a midfielder. At the 2012 Summer Olympics, she represented Cameroon.
