= Bébéy Beyene =

Cameroonian footballer

Personal information
- Date of birth: 10 May 1992 (age 34)
- Place of birth: Yaoundé, Cameroon

Senior career*
| Years | Team | Apps | (Gls) |
- Louves Minproff
- Yaoundé (CMR)

International career
- Cameroon
- * Club domestic league appearances and goals

Ariane "Bébéy" Beyene (born 10 May 1992) is a Cameroonian footballer who played for the Cameroon women's national football team at the 2012 Summer Olympics. At club level she has played for Louves Minproff and Yaoundé (CMR).

== See also ==
- Cameroon at the 2012 Summer Olympics
