= Cameroon women's national football team =

Women's national association football team representing Cameroon

Cameroon
- Nickname: Les Lionnes Indomptables (The Indomitable Lionesses)
- Association: Fédération Camerounaise de Football
- Confederation: CAF (Africa)
- Sub-confederation: UNIFFAC (Central Africa)
- Head coach: Valentine Nguele
- Captain: Christine Manie
- Most caps: Madeleine Ngono Mani (87)
- Top scorer: Madeleine Ngono Mani (40)
- Home stadium: Stade Ahmadou Ahidjo
- FIFA code: CMR
First colours	Second colours	Third colours

FIFA ranking
- Current: 71 ▼1 (16 June 2026)
- Highest: 41 (July 2019)
- Lowest: 90 (October 2007)

First international
- Nigeria 2–0 Cameroon (Lagos, Nigeria; 15 June 1991)

Biggest win
- Cameroon 8–0 Gambia (Yaoundé, Cameroon; 18 February 2022)

Biggest defeat
- Nigeria 6–0 Cameroon (Kaduna, Nigeria; 27 October 1998); France 6–0 Cameroon (Paris, France; 10 October 2018)

World Cup
- Appearances: 3 (first in 2015)
- Best result: Round of 16 (2015, 2019)

Africa Women Cup of Nations
- Appearances: 11 (first in 1998)
- Best result: (gold) Champions (2026)

Olympic Games
- Appearances: 1 (first in 2012)
- Best result: Group stage (2012)
Medal record
Women's Africa Cup of Nations
Gold medal – first place	2026 Morocco

The Cameroon national women's football team, nicknamed the Indomitable Lionesses, is the national team of Cameroon and is controlled by the Cameroon Football Association. They won their first title in the 2026 Africa Women Cup of Nations, participated in the 2012 Olympic Games and have competed in their first ever FIFA Women's World Cup in 2015.

== History ==
The team was formed in the 1980s but didn't gain significant attention until the 1990s. Cameroon participated in their first major tournament, the African Women's Championship (now known as the Women's Africa Cup of Nations), in 1991. Cameroon quickly established itself as one of the top teams in Africa. The team has been a consistent contender in the tournament, often finishing as runners-up. The Lionesses made their FIFA Women's World Cup debut in 2015 in Canada, where they reached the Round of 16. This was a significant achievement for the team and marked their arrival on the global stage. They also qualified for the 2019 FIFA Women's World Cup in France, again reaching the Round of 16. Cameroon qualified for the 2012 London Olympics, marking another milestone in their development. Though they did not advance past the group stage, participation in such a prestigious tournament highlighted their growing stature.

== Team image ==
=== Home stadium ===
The Cameroon women's national football team plays their home matches on the Stade Ahmadou Ahidjo.

== Overall competitive record ==
Competition	Stage	Result	Opponent	Position	Scorers
1991 African Championship	Quarterfinals	Walkover	(Republic of the Congo) Congo		
1991 African Championship	Semifinals	Walkover	Zambia		
1991 African Championship	Final	0–2 0–4 (0–6 agg.)	Nigeria		
1995 African Championship	Quarterfinals	Withdrew	Angola		
1998 African Championship qualification		Walkover	Sierra Leone		
(Nigeria) 1998 African Championship	First stage	3–2; 1–3	South Africa; Ghana		
(Nigeria) 1998 African Championship	Semifinals	0–6	Nigeria		
(Nigeria) 1998 African Championship	3rd place	3–3 (PSO: 1–3)	(Democratic Republic of the Congo) Congo DR		
2000 African Championship qualification		3–0 w/o	Gabon		
(South Africa) 2000 African Championship	First stage	4–1; 0–2; 0–3	Morocco; Ghana; Nigeria	3 / 4	Abbe, Anong, Anounga, Njolle
2002 African Championship qualification	Second round	0–0 4–0	Gabon		
(Nigeria) 2002 African Championship	First stage	1–2; 0–0; 1–0	South Africa; Zimbabwe; Angola	2 / 4	Anounga Ngono
(Nigeria) 2002 African Championship	Semifinals	2–3	Ghana		Pokam, Belemgoto
(Nigeria) 2002 African Championship	3rd place	3–0	South Africa		
(Nigeria) 2003 African Games	First stage	3–0; 0–1; 1–1	Ethiopia; Nigeria; Zimbabwe	2 / 4	Bella, Mekongo Ngono
(Nigeria) 2003 African Games	Semifinals	1–3	South Africa		
(Nigeria) 2003 African Games	3rd place	1–0	Mali		
2004 African Championship qualification	Second round	0–0 2–0	(Republic of the Congo) Congo		Mbida, Ngo Ndoumbouk
(South Africa) 2004 African Championship	First stage	2–2; 2–2; 3–1	Mali; Nigeria; Algeria	2 / 4	Mbida, Mete; Bella, Mekongo; Mbida 2, Mekongo
(South Africa) 2004 African Championship	Semifinals	1–0 (AET)	Ghana		Bella
(South Africa) 2004 African Championship	Final	0–5	Nigeria		
2006 African Championship qualification	Second round	4–0 5–0	Kenya		
(Nigeria) 2006 African Championship	First stage	1–1; 1–2; 2–0	(Democratic Republic of the Congo) Congo DR; Ghana; Mali	2 / 4	Ngono; Bella; Bekombo, Ngo Ndoumbouk
(Nigeria) 2006 African Championship	Semifinals	0–5	Nigeria		
(Nigeria) 2006 African Championship	3rd place	2–2 (PSO: 4–5)	South Africa		
2007 African Games qualification		Withdrew	(Democratic Republic of the Congo) Congo DR		
2008 African Championship qualification	Second round	3–0 2–1	Tanzania		
(Equatorial Guinea) 2008 African Championship	First stage	0–1; 2–1; 1–0	Equatorial Guinea; Mali (Democratic Republic of the Congo) Congo DR	2 / 4	Bekombo, Ngo Ndoumbouk; Ngono
(Equatorial Guinea) 2008 African Championship	Semifinals	0–3	South Africa		
(Equatorial Guinea) 2008 African Championship	3rd place	1–1 (PSO: 3–4)	Nigeria		Onguene — (penalty scored) 1 Ngo Ndoumbouk, 2 Manie, 4 Onguene (penalty missed) 3 Bella, 5 Mbida
2010 African Championship qualification	Second round	2–0 3–0	(Democratic Republic of the Congo) Congo DR		Ngono 2, Bella, Enganamouit, Onguene
(South Africa) 2010 African Championship	First stage	2–2; 2–1; 2–1	Equatorial Guinea; Ghana; Algeria	2 / 4	Manie, Ngono; Manie, Ngo Ndoumbouk; Onguene, Ejangue
(South Africa) 2010 African Championship	Semifinals	1–5	Nigeria		Ngock
(South Africa) 2010 African Championship	3rd place	0–2	South Africa		
(Mozambique) 2011 African Games	First stage	1–0; 3–0; Walkover	Mozambique; Algeria; Guinea	1 / 3	Zouga; Beyene, Iven, Manie
(Mozambique) 2011 African Games	Semifinals	2–0	South Africa		Enganamouit, Onguene
(Mozambique) 2011 African Games	Final	1–0	Ghana		Ngono
2012 Summer Olympics qualification	Second round	5–0 1–0	Mali		Bella, Manie, Nkout, Onguene, Zouga, ?
2012 Summer Olympics qualification	Third round	0–0 0–2 ^{1}	Equatorial Guinea		
2012 Summer Olympics qualification	Fourth round	1–2 2–1 (PSO: 4–3)	Nigeria		Manie, Zouga + 1 o.g.
(United Kingdom) 2012 Summer Olympics	First stage	0–5; 0–3; 1–3	Brazil (United Kingdom) Great Britain; New Zealand	4 / 4	Onguene
2012 African Championship qualification	Second round	1–1 1–1 (PSO: 10–9)	Ghana		Iven, Manie
(Equatorial Guinea) 2012 African Championship	First stage	1–2; 4–1; 0–0	Nigeria; Ivory Coast; Ethiopia	2 / 4	Manie; Iven 2, Onguene, Zouga
(Equatorial Guinea) 2012 African Championship	Semifinals	0–2	Equatorial Guinea		
(Equatorial Guinea) 2012 African Championship	3rd place	1–0	Nigeria		Enganamouit
2014 African Women's Championship qualification	Second round	1–1 2–1	Senegal		Nchout, Zouga
(Namibia) 2014 African Championship	First stage	1–0; 2–0; 0–1	South Africa; Algeria; Ghana	1 / 4	Feudjio; Enganamouit 2
(Namibia) 2014 African Championship	Semifinals	2–1 (a.e.t.)	Ivory Coast		Enganamouit, Manie
(Namibia) 2014 African Championship	Final	0–2	Nigeria		
(Canada) 2015 FIFA Women's World Cup	First stage	6–0; 1–2; 2–1	Ecuador; Japan; Switzerland	2 / 4	Ngono, Enganamouit 3, Manie, Onguene; Nchout; Onguene, Ngono
(Canada) 2015 FIFA Women's World Cup	Round of 16	0–1	China PR		
(France) 2019 FIFA Women's World Cup	First stage	0–1; 1–3; 2–1	Canada; Netherlands; New Zealand	3 / 4	Onguene; Nchout 2
(France) 2019 FIFA Women's World Cup	Round of 16	0–3	England		

^{1} Equatorial Guinea was disqualified from the competition for fielding an ineligible player, so Cameroon advanced to the final qualifying round instead.

== Results and fixtures ==
The following is a list of match results in the last 12 months, as well as any future matches that have been scheduled.

Legend

Win Draw Lose Fixture

=== 2025 ===
23 October 2025 2026 WAFCON qualifying	Algeria	2–1	Cameroon	Oran, Algeria
19:00 UTC+1	Karchouni 23'; Dafeur 35'	Report	Nchout 90+4' (pen.)	Stadium: Miloud Hadefi Stadium; Referee: Awa Ilboudo (Burkina Faso)

28 October 2025 2026 WAFCON qualifying	Cameroon	0–1 (1–3 agg.)	Algeria	Douala, Cameroon
16:00 UTC+1		Report	Dafeur 23'	Stadium: Stade de la Réunification; Attendance: 0 (Behind closed doors); Referee: Diana Murungi (Uganda)
Note: Algeria won 3–1 on aggregate.

=== 2026 ===
28 February 2026 Friendly	Cameroon	1–0	Nigeria	Yaoundé, Cameroon
16:00 UTC+1	Mbomozomo 12'	Report		Stadium: Stade Militaire

3 March 2026 Friendly	Cameroon	1–3	Nigeria	Yaoundé, Cameroon
16:00 UTC+1	Meva 7'		Ihezuo 26'; Babajide 43'; Alozie 64'	Stadium: Stade Militaire

11 July 2026 Friendly	Cameroon	3–1	Benin	Yaoundé, Cameroon
16:00 UTC+1	Ngueleu 51', 54'; Ngah Manga 80'	Report	Gnammi 5'	Stadium: Stade Militaire; Referee: Aïcha Bit Oumarou (Chad)

27 July 2026 2026 WAFCON GS	Cameroon	2–1	Mali	Casablanca, Morocco
21:00	Ngah Manga 14', 73' (pen.)	Report (FIFA)	A. Traoré 30' (pen.)	Stadium: Larbi Zaouli Stadium; Referee: Antsino Twanyanyukwa (Namibia)

2 August 2026 2026 WAFCON GS	Ghana	0–1	Cameroon	Casablanca, Morocco
18:00 (UTC+01:00)		Report (FIFA)	Ngah Manga 19' (pen.)	Stadium: Moulay Rachid Stadium; Referee: Shahenda El Maghrabi (Egypt)

6 August 2026 2026 WAFCON GS	Cape Verde	1–1	Cameroon	Casablanca, Morocco
21:00 (UTC+01:00)	Moreira 50'	Report (FIFA)	Mendoua 28'	Stadium: Larbi Zaouli Stadium; Referee: Zakia El Grini (Morocco)

9 August 2026 CAF WAFCON 2026 QF	Cameroon	1–0	Nigeria	Casablanca, Morocco
18:00 (UTC+01:00)	Nyadjou 19'	Report		Stadium: Larbi Zaouli Stadium

12 August 2026 2026 WAFCON SF	Morocco	0–0 (a.e.t.) (1–3 p)	Cameroon	Moulay El Hassan Stadium
18:00		Report (FIFA)
	Penalties
	Aït El Haj (penalty scored); Chapelle (penalty missed); Atiq (penalty missed); Ouzraoui (penalty missed)		(penalty scored) Ngah Manga; (penalty missed) Mendoua; (penalty scored) Rose; (penalty scored) Nyadjou

16 August 2026 2026 WAFCON Final	Cameroon	3–0	Malawi	Rabat
20:00	Ngah Manga 20', 45+3'; Eto 29'	Report (FIFA)		Stadium: Moulay El Hassan Stadium; Referee: Shahenda El Maghrabi (Egypt)

== Coaching staff ==
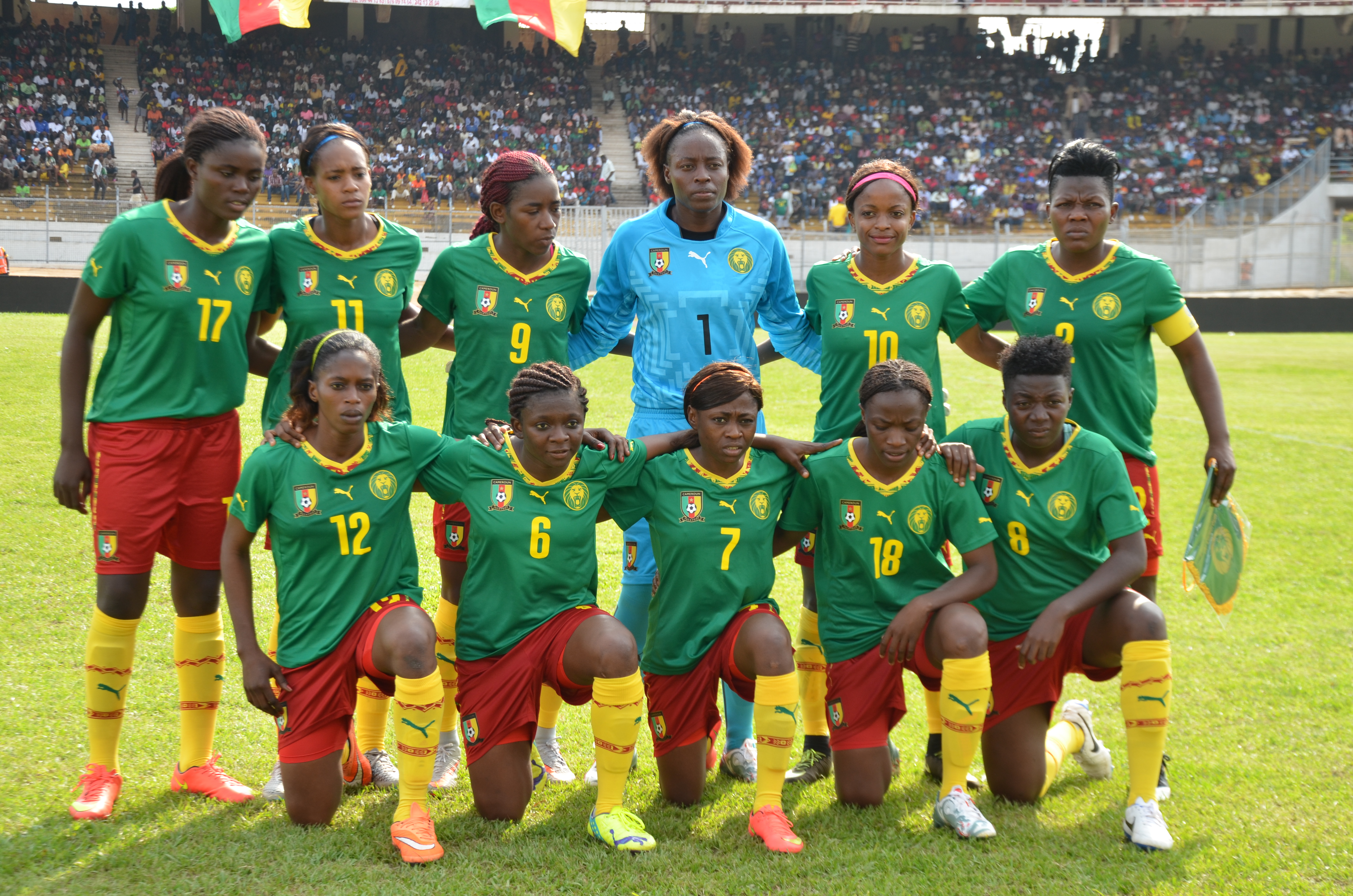
Equipe Cameroun

=== Current coaching staff ===
updated as 07/08/2026

Position	Name	Ref.
Head coach	(Cameroon) Valentine Nguele	

=== Manager history ===
- (Cameroon) Carl Enow (2003–2018)
- (Cameroon) Alain Djeumfa (2019–2022)
- (Cameroon) Gabriel Zabo (2022–2023)
- (Cameroon) Jean-Baptiste Bisseck (2023–2025)
- (Cameroon) Alain Djeumfa (2025– )

== Players ==
=== Current squad ===
- The following players were called up for the 2026 WAFCON matches from 26 July through 16 August 2026. .

Note: All player data is sourced from the official CAF squad list. Club listings correspond to the official registration data provided by CAF and may not reflect recent player transfers prior to the tournament.

No.	Pos.	Player	Date of birth (age)	Club
1	GK	Cathy Biya	18 July 2006 (aged 20)	(Royal Spanish Football Federation) Getafe
2	DF	Easther Mayi Kith	28 March 1997 (aged 29)	(Japan Football Association) Urawa Red Diamonds
3	DF	Berthe Abega	14 June 2001 (aged 25)	(Royal Moroccan Football Federation) Phoenix Marrakesh
4	DF	Ladifatou Ngambe	18 October 2003 (aged 22)	(Congolese Association Football Federation) TP Mazembe
5	DF	Lewyo Mogai	16 November 2004 (aged 21)	(Cameroonian Football Federation) Ebolowa
6	MF	Achta Toko Njoya	8 July 2005 (aged 21)	(Royal Spanish Football Federation) Real Madrid B
7	FW	Gabrielle Aboudi Onguéné (Captain)	25 February 1989 (aged 37)	(Russian Football Union) CSKA Moscow
8	MF	Fatima Komé	22 July 2002 (aged 24)	(Turkish Football Federation) Beşiktaş
9	FW	Grâce Mendoua	18 February 2005 (aged 21)	(Cameroonian Football Federation) Ebolowa
10	FW	Naomi Eto	29 September 2004 (aged 21)	(Italian Football Federation) Sassuolo
11	FW	Marie Ngah Manga	20 October 2002 (aged 23)	(Turkish Football Federation) Galatasaray
12	MF	Ornella Beulou	30 May 2001 (aged 25)	(Cameroonian Football Federation) Ebolowa
13	MF	Charlène Meyong	19 November 1998 (aged 27)	(Saudi Arabian Football Federation) Al-Ahli
14	MF	Monique Ngock	17 September 2004 (aged 21)	(French Football Federation) Fleury
15	DF	Colette Ndzana	19 July 2000 (aged 26)	(French Football Federation) Dijon
16	GK	Ange Bawou	12 February 2000 (aged 26)	(Cameroonian Football Federation) Dja Sports
17	FW	Rose Bella	5 May 1994 (aged 32)	(Saudi Arabian Football Federation) Al-Ula
18	DF	Claudia Dabda	1 July 2001 (aged 25)	(Saudi Arabian Football Federation) Al-Hilal
19	MF	Raïssa Mbappé	4 October 1993 (aged 32)	(Royal Spanish Football Federation) Real Oviedo
20	MF	Geneviève Ngo Mbeleck	10 March 1993 (aged 33)	(Turkish Football Federation) Amed
21	DF	Maéva Nyadjou	14 October 2006 (aged 19)	(Cameroonian Football Federation) Amazone FAP
22	FW	Michaela Abam	12 June 1997 (aged 29)	(Mexican Football Federation) Cruz Azul
23	GK	Michaely Bihina	28 December 2003 (aged 22)	(Portuguese Football Federation) Benfica
24	FW	Nina Ngueleu	11 December 2004 (aged 21)	(French Football Federation) Montpellier
25	DF	Ousmanou Doudou	26 January 1996 (aged 30)	(Cameroonian Football Federation) Ebolowa
26	DF	Ivana Yakana	17 November 2005 (aged 20)	(Cameroonian Football Federation) Lekié FF

=== Recent call-ups ===
- The following players were named to a Cameroon squad in the last 12 months.

This list may be incomplete.

Pos.	Player	Date of birth (age)	Caps	Goals	Club	Latest call-up
GK	Chelsea Ngole	14 June 2007 (age 19)			(Cameroon) Louves Minproff	v. Algeria, October 2025
DF	Mathilde Kack	26 March 2000 (age 26)			(France) Reims	v. Nigeria, June 2025
DF	Mariane Maague	11 June 2004 (age 22)			(France) Orléans	v. Nigeria, June 2025
DF	Prisca Mache Talla				(Cameroon) Fossito Foot Académie	v. Algeria, October 2025
DF	Falone Meffometou	1 July 1990 (age 36)			(France) FC Fleury 91	v. Algeria, October 2025
DF	Mireille Tchengang	20 December 2002 (age 23)			(Luxembourg) Racing Union Lëtzebuerg	v. Algeria, October 2025
MF	Camilla Daha	4 October 2003 (age 23)			(Spain) Getafe	v. Morocco, 8 April 2025
MF	Elise Ndome	1 January 2003 (age 23)			(Cameroon) Amazone FAP	v. Morocco, 8 April 2025
MF	Brigitte Omboudou	29 July 1992 (age 34)			(Saudi Arabia) NEOM SC	v. Algeria, October 2025
MF	Gloria Monica Nsoga Makanda				(Cameroon) Diambars Féminas FC	v. Algeria, October 2025
FW	Ajara Nchout Njoya	12 January 1993 (age 33)			(Saudi Arabia) Al Qadsiah	v. Algeria, October 2025
FW	Lys Tiwa	4 May 2008 (age 18)			(Cameroon) Lekié FF	v. Nigeria, June 2025
FW	Ashley Ndifone	1 January 2007 (age 19)			(Cameroon) Ita Mbong FC	v. Nigeria, June 2025
FW	Shalom Tim	7 August 2001 (age 25)			(Cameroon) Louves Minproff	v. Algeria, October 2025
FW	Mana Lamine	15 June 2005 (age 21)			(China) Changchun Zhutai FC	v. Algeria, October 2025
FW	Alexandra Takoukam Engolo				(Cameroon) Diambars Féminas FC	v. Algeria, October 2025
FW	Doly Diane Wabeua Djatio				(Portugal) Diamantes SAD	v. Algeria, October 2025

=== Previous squads ===
FIFA Women's World Cup

- 2015 FIFA Women's World Cup squad
- 2019 FIFA Women's World Cup squad

Summer Olympics

- 2012 Summer Olympics squad

Africa Women Cup of Nations

- 2000 African Women's Championship squad
- 2010 African Women's Championship squad
- 2012 African Women's Championship squad
- 2014 African Women's Championship squad
- 2016 Africa Women Cup of Nations squad
- 2018 Africa Women Cup of Nations squad
- 2022 Africa Women Cup of Nations squad
- 2026 Women's Africa Cup of Nations squad

=== Captains ===
- Christine Manie (????–)

== Honours ==
=== Major competitions ===
- Women's Africa Cup of Nations

Champions (1): 2026
Runners-up: 2004, 2014, 2016

=== Regional ===
- COSAFA Women's Championship

Runners-up: 2018

== Competitive record ==
=== FIFA Women's World Cup ===
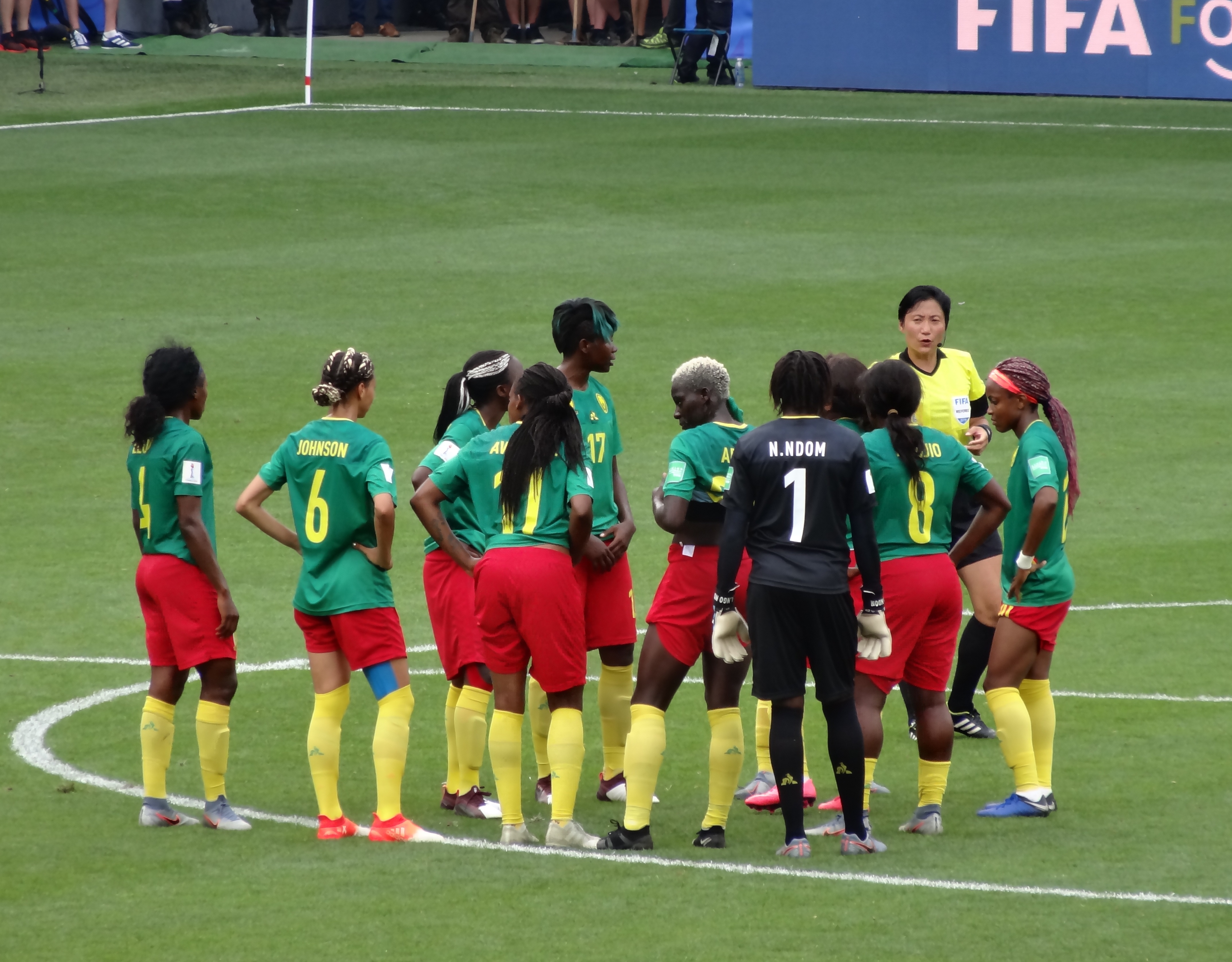
Cameroun Women's World Cup 2019

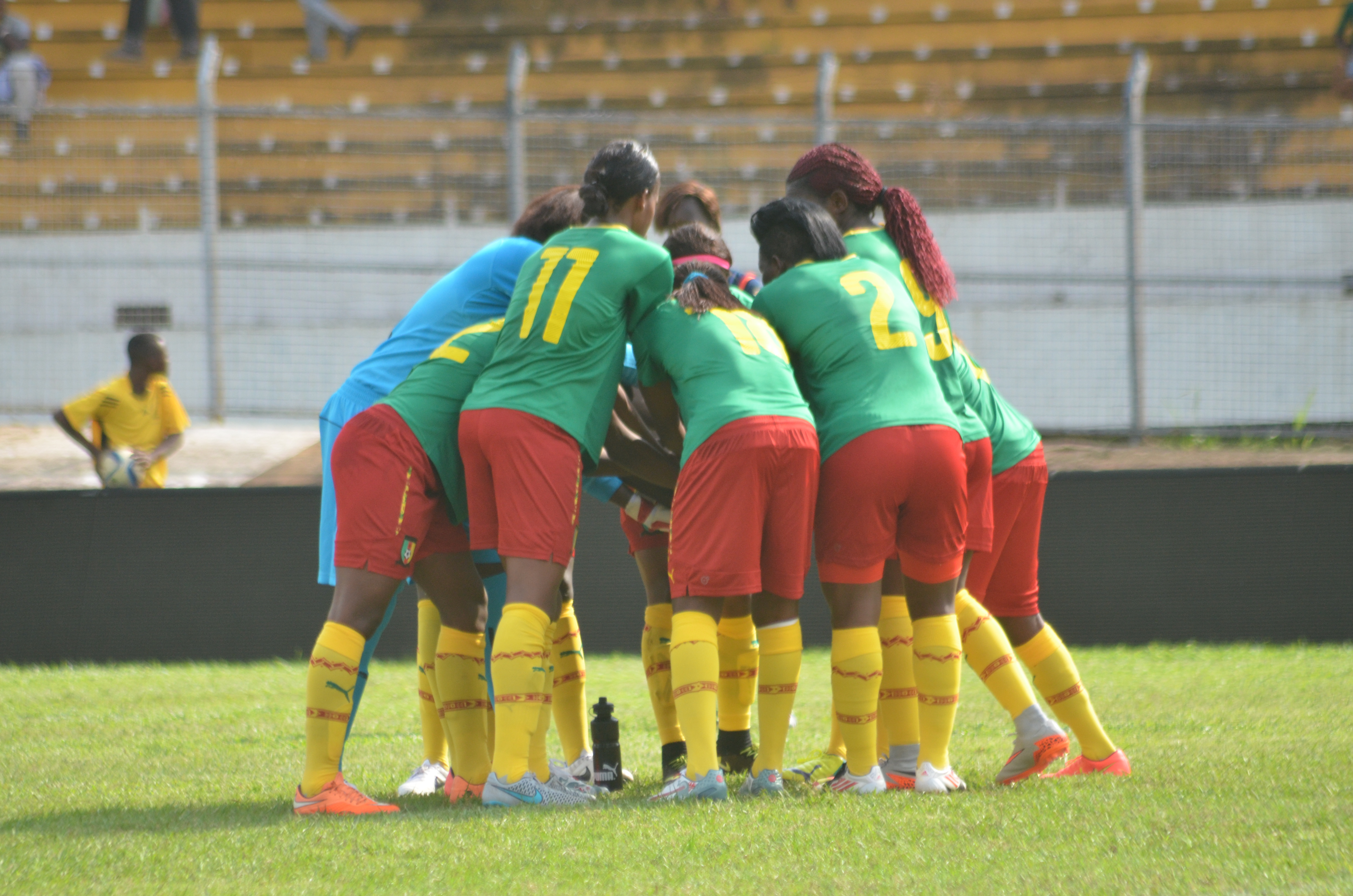
EquipeCameroun1

FIFA Women's World Cup record
Year	Round	Position	Pld	W	D*	L	GF	GA
(China) 1991	Did not qualify							
(Sweden) 1995	Withdrew from qualification							
(United States) 1999	Did not qualify							
(United States) 2003	Did not qualify							
(China) 2007	Did not qualify							
(Germany) 2011	Did not qualify							
(Canada) 2015	Round of 16	11th	4	2	0	2	9	4
(France) 2019	Round of 16	15th	4	1	0	3	3	8
(Australia) (New Zealand) 2023	Did not qualify							
(Brazil) 2027	Qualified							
(Costa Rica) (Jamaica) (Mexico) (United States) 2031	To be determined							
(United Kingdom) 2035	To be determined							
Total	3/10	-	8	3	0	5	12	12

FIFA Women's World Cup history
Year	Round	Date	Opponent	Result	Stadium
(Canada) 2015	Group stage	8 June	Ecuador	W 6–0	BC Place, Vancouver
(Canada) 2015	Group stage	12 June	Japan	L 1–2	BC Place, Vancouver
(Canada) 2015	Group stage	16 June	Switzerland	W 2–1	Commonwealth Stadium, Edmonton
(Canada) 2015	Round of 16	20 June	China	L 0–1	Olympic Stadium, Montreal
(France) 2019	Group stage	10 June	Canada	L 0–1	Stade de la Mosson, Montpellier
(France) 2019	Group stage	15 June	Netherlands	L 1–3	Stade du Hainaut, Valenciennes
(France) 2019	Group stage	20 June	New Zealand	W 2–1	Stade de la Mosson, Montpellier
(France) 2019	Round of 16	23 June	England	L 0–3	Stade du Hainaut, Valenciennes
(Brazil) 2027	Group stage			–	
(Brazil) 2027	Group stage			–	
(Brazil) 2027	Group stage			–	

*Draws include knockout matches decided on penalty kicks.

=== Olympic Games ===
For 2012 Cameroon qualified for the first time to the Olympics.

Summer Olympics record
Year	Round	Pld	W	D	L	GF	GA
(United States) 1996	Withdrew in Qualification						
(Australia) 2000	did not qualify						
(Greece) 2004	did not qualify						
(China) 2008	did not qualify						
(United Kingdom) 2012	Group stage	3	0	0	3	1	11
(Brazil) 2016	did not qualify						
(Japan) 2020	did not qualify						
(France) 2024	did not qualify						
Total	1/8	3	0	0	3	1	11

=== Africa Women Cup of Nations ===
Africa Women Cup of Nations record
Year	Round	Pld	W	D	L	GF	GA
(Nigeria) 1998	Fourth place	4	1	1	2	7	14
(South Africa) 2000	Group stage	3	1	0	2	4	6
(Nigeria) 2002	Third place	5	2	1	2	7	5
(South Africa) 2004	Runners-up	5	2	2	1	8	10
(Nigeria) 2006	Fourth place	5	1	2	2	6	10
(Equatorial Guinea) 2008	Fourth place	5	2	1	2	4	6
(South Africa) 2010	Fourth place	5	2	1	2	7	11
(Equatorial Guinea) 2012	Third place	5	2	1	2	6	5
(Namibia) 2014	Runners-up	5	3	0	2	5	4
(Cameroon) 2016	Runners-up	5	4	0	1	6	1
(Ghana) 2018	Third place	5	3	2	0	10	4
(Republic of the Congo) 2020	Cancelled						
(Morocco) 2022	Quarter-finals	4	2	2	1	3	2
(Morocco) 2024	Did not qualify						
(Morocco) 2026	Champions	6	4	2	0	8	2
Total:13/16	1 Title	63	29	15	19	82	80

=== African Games ===
African Games record
Year	Result	M	W	D	L	GF	GA
(Nigeria) 2003	3rd place, bronze medalist(s)	5	2	1	2	7	5
(Algeria) 2007		withdraw					
(Mozambique) 2011	1st place, gold medalist(s)	4	4	0	0	7	0
(Republic of the Congo) 2015	2nd place, silver medalist(s)	4	1	2	1	4	4
(Morocco) 2019	See Cameroon women's national under-20 football team						
(Ghana) 2023	See Cameroon women's national under-20 football team						
Total	3/4	13	7	3	3	18	9

=== UNIFFAC Women's Cup ===
UNIFFAC Women's Cup
Year	Result	Matches	Wins	Draws	Losses	GF	GA	GD
(Equatorial Guinea) 2020	did not enter							
Total	1/1	4	0	3	1	4	5	−1

== See also ==
- Sport in Cameroon
  - Football in Cameroon
    - Women's football in Cameroon
- Cameroon women's national under-20 football team
- Cameroon women's national under-17 football team
- Cameroon men's national football team
