= 2022–23 NWFL Premiership =

- Season: 2022–23
- Dates: 30 November 2022–19 April 2023 (Regular season) 6–11 June 2023 (Playoffs)
- Champions: Delta Queens (6th title)
- Promoted: Ibom Angels; Heartland
- Relegated: Ibom Angels; Osun Babes
- CAF Women's Champions League: Delta Queens
- Matches: 92
- Goals: 187 (2.03 per match)
- Top goalscorer: Mercy Omokwu (9 goals)
- Biggest home win: Robo Queens 7–1 Ibom Angels (5 April 2023)
- Highest scoring: Robo Queens 7–1 Ibom Angels (5 April 2023)
- All statistics correct as of 11 June 2023.

The 2022–23 NWFL Premiership was the 33rd season of Nigeria's top flight women's football league and the third season since its rebranding. The regular season commenced 30 November 2022 and ended 19 April 2023 with the playoffs taking place from 6 to 11 June 2023.

Like the previous season, it is an abridged league with two groups of 7 teams, after which is followed by a Super six play-off tournament for the top three teams in each group.

Heartland Queens and Ibom Angels were promoted from the NWFL Championship replacing Sunshine Queens and Pelican Stars who were relegated the previous season.

Alongside Osun Babes, Ibom Angels failed to retain their place and returned to the Championship.

On 11 June, Delta Queens defeated defending champions Bayelsa Queens at the super six final to claim their sixth title and earn the right to play at the 2023 CAF Women's Champions League.

== Clubs ==
| Clubs | Stadium | City |
|---|---|---|
| Adamawa Queens | Pantami Stadium | Yola |
| Abia Angels | Umuahia Township Stadium | Umuahia |
| Bayelsa Queens | Yenagoa Township Stadium | Yenagoa |
| Confluence Queens | Confluence Stadium | Lokoja |
| Delta Queens | Stephen Keshi Stadium | Asaba |
| Edo Queens | University of Benin Sports Complex Samuel Ogbemudia Stadium | Benin City |
| Heartland Queens | Dan Anyiam Stadium | Owerri |
| Ibom Angels | Godswill Akpabio Stadium Training Pitch | Uyo |
| Naija Ratels | Aper Aku Stadium | Makurdi |
| Nasarawa Amazons F.C. | Lafia Township Stadium | Lafia |
| Osun Babes | Osogbo Stadium | Osogbo |
| Rivers Angels | Adokiye Amiesimaka Stadium | Port Harcourt |
| Robo | Legacy Pitch | Lagos |
| Royal Queens | Warri Township Stadium | Warri |

== Regular season ==
=== Group A ===
==== Table ====
| Pos | Team | Pld | W | D | L | GF | GA | GD | Pts | Qualification |
|---|---|---|---|---|---|---|---|---|---|---|
| 1 | Delta Queens | 12 | 7 | 5 | 0 | 19 | 5 | +14 | 26 | Play-offs |
| 2 | Bayelsa Queens | 12 | 7 | 4 | 1 | 18 | 5 | +13 | 25 | Play-offs |
| 3 | Rivers Angels | 12 | 4 | 6 | 2 | 8 | 7 | +1 | 18 | Play-offs |
| 4 | Naija Ratels | 12 | 3 | 4 | 5 | 10 | 11 | −1 | 13 | |
| 5 | Heartland Queens | 12 | 3 | 3 | 6 | 6 | 13 | −7 | 12 | |
| 6 | Royal Queens | 12 | 2 | 4 | 6 | 4 | 12 | −8 | 10 | |
| 7 | Osun Babes | 12 | 2 | 2 | 8 | 6 | 18 | −12 | 8 | Relegated |

Source: TheNWFL

==== Results ====
| Home \ Away | BAY | DEL | HEA | RAT | OSU | RIV | ROY |
|---|---|---|---|---|---|---|---|
| Bayelsa Queens | | 1–1 | 0–0 | 3–0 | 4–0 | 2–0 | 1–0 |
| Delta Queens | 2–1 | | 3–1 | 2–0 | 3–0 | 1–1 | 3–0 |
| Heartland Queens | 0–0 | 0–2 | | 0–2 | 2–0 | 0–0 | 1–0 |
| Naija Ratels | 1–1 | 0–0 | 3–1 | | 3–0 | 0–1 | 1–1 |
| Osun Babes | 0–1 | 1–2 | 2–0 | 0–0 | | 0–0 | 2–0 |
| Rivers Angels | 1–2 | 0–0 | 1–0 | 1–0 | 2–1 | | 1–1 |
| Royal Queens | 0–2 | 0–0 | 0–1 | 1–0 | 1–0 | 0–0 | |

Source: TheNWFL
Legend: Blue = home team win; Yellow = draw; Red = away team win.

=== Group B ===
==== Table ====
| Pos | Team | Pld | W | D | L | GF | GA | GD | Pts | Qualification |
|---|---|---|---|---|---|---|---|---|---|---|
| 1 | Edo Queens | 12 | 8 | 1 | 3 | 24 | 10 | +14 | 25 | Play-offs |
| 2 | Robo Queens | 12 | 7 | 1 | 4 | 24 | 11 | +13 | 22 | Play-offs |
| 3 | Confluence Queens | 12 | 6 | 3 | 3 | 15 | 15 | 0 | 21 | Play-offs |
| 4 | Nasarawa Amazons | 12 | 6 | 2 | 4 | 19 | 10 | +9 | 20 | |
| 5 | Adamawa Queens | 12 | 4 | 2 | 6 | 7 | 18 | −11 | 14 | |
| 6 | Abia Angels | 12 | 3 | 2 | 7 | 7 | 12 | −5 | 11 | |
| 7 | Ibom Angels | 12 | 2 | 1 | 9 | 6 | 26 | −20 | 7 | Relegated |

Source: TheNWFL

==== Results ====
| Home \ Away | ABI | ADA | CON | EDO | IBM | NAS | ROB |
|---|---|---|---|---|---|---|---|
| Abia Angels | | 1–0 | 1–2 | 0–1 | 0–0 | 1–2 | 1–0 |
| Adamawa Queens | 1–0 | | 1–0 | 1–1 | 2–0 | 1–0 | 1–2 |
| Confluence Queens | 1–1 | 0–0 | | 2–1 | 2–0 | 0–0 | 2–1 |
| Edo Queens | 0–1 | 4–0 | 4–2 | | 4–0 | 3–2 | 2–0 |
| Ibom Angels | 1–0 | 2–0 | 0–1 | 0–2 | | 0–1 | 2–3 |
| Nasarawa Amazons | 2–1 | 5–0 | 2–3 | 1–0 | 4–0 | | 0–1 |
| Robo Queens | 2–0 | 3–0 | 4–0 | 1–2 | 7–1 | 0–0 | |

Source: TheNWFL
Legend: Blue = home team win; Yellow = draw; Red = away team win.

== Play-offs ==
The Super six playoffs was played between 6-11 June 2023 in two groups of three teams. The top teams from both groups played a final match to decide the champion who also earns the right to play at the 2023 CAF Women's Champions League regional qualifying stage. All matches were played at Stephen Keshi Stadium, Asaba.

=== Group A ===
| Pos | Team | Pld | W | D | L | GF | GA | GD | Pts | Qualification |
|---|---|---|---|---|---|---|---|---|---|---|
| 1 | Bayelsa Queens | 2 | 2 | 0 | 0 | 2 | 0 | +2 | 6 | Qualified for the final and CAF WCL |
| 2 | Rivers Angels | 2 | 1 | 0 | 1 | 2 | 1 | +1 | 3 | Third place |
| 3 | Robo Queens | 2 | 0 | 0 | 2 | 0 | 3 | −3 | 0 | |

Updated to match(es) played on 7 June 2023. Source: TheNWFL

| Home \ Away | BAY | RIV | ROB |
|---|---|---|---|
| Bayelsa Queens | | 1–0 | 1–0 |
| Rivers Angels | | | 2–0 |
| Robo Queens | | | |

Updated to match(es) played on 7 June 2023. Source: TheNWFL
Legend: Blue = home team win; Yellow = draw; Red = away team win.

=== Group B ===
| Pos | Team | Pld | W | D | L | GF | GA | GD | Pts | Qualification |
|---|---|---|---|---|---|---|---|---|---|---|
| 1 | Delta Queens | 2 | 1 | 1 | 0 | 3 | 1 | +2 | 4 | Qualified for the final and CAF WCL |
| 2 | Confluence Queens | 2 | 1 | 0 | 1 | 2 | 3 | −1 | 3 | Third place |
| 3 | Edo Queens | 2 | 0 | 1 | 1 | 0 | 1 | −1 | 1 | |

Updated to match(es) played on 7 June 2023. Source: TheNWFL

| Home \ Away | CON | DEL | EDO |
|---|---|---|---|
| Confluence Queens | | | 1–0 |
| Delta Queens | 3–1 | | |
| Edo Queens | | 0–0 | |

Updated to match(es) played on 7 June 2023. Source: TheNWFL
Legend: Blue = home team win; Yellow = draw; Red = away team win.

==== Third place match ====
| 11 June 2023 | Rivers Angels | 2–0 | Confluence Queens | Stephen Keshi Stadium, Asaba |
| 12:00 (UTC+1) | Okwuchukwu 61'; Oghenebrume 68' |

==== Final ====
Winner is the champion and qualifies for the 2023 CAF Women's Champions League.

| 11 June 2023 | Delta Queens | 2–1 | Bayelsa Queens | Stephen Keshi Stadium, Asaba |
| 16:00 (UTC+1) | Agoh 67', 86' | Report | Henry 14' (o.g.) |

== Top scorers ==
| Rank | Player | Club | Goals |
|---|---|---|---|
| 1 | (Nigeria) Mercy Omokwu | Delta Queens | 9 |
| 2 | (Nigeria) Chinaza Agoh | Delta Queens | 8 |
| 3 | (Nigeria) Okah Adaobi | Edo Queens/Rivers Angels | 6 |
| 3 | (Nigeria) Sabastine Flourish | Bayelsa Queens | 6 |
| 3 | (Nigeria) Agams Nkechi | Abia Angels | 6 |
| 3 | (Nigeria) Ijamilusi Folashade | Robo Queens | 6 |
| 7 | (Nigeria) Aweda Titilayo | Nasarawa Amazons | 5 |
| 7 | (Nigeria) Chioma Moses | Confluence Queens/Edo Queens | 5 |
| 7 | (Nigeria) Osigwe Chukuwuamaka | Confluence Queens | 5 |

== Season's awards ==
| Award | Winner | Club |
|---|---|---|
| Best Player | Chinaza Agoh | Delta Queens |
| League Topscorer | Omokwo Mercy | Delta Queens |
| Best goalkeeper | Mgbechi Anderline | Delta Queens |
