= 2023–24 NWFL Premiership =

- Season: 2023–24
- Dates: 14 November 2023 – 26 May 2024
- Champions: Edo Queens (1st title)
- Relegated: Royal Queens; Sunshine Queens
- CAF Women's Champions League: Edo Queens
- Matches: 129
- Goals: 268 (2.08 per match)
- Top goalscorer: Ijamilusi Folashade (8 goals)
- All statistics correct as of 26 May 2024.

The 2023–24 NWFL Premiership was the 34th season of the women's football top-level league in Nigeria. The season commenced on 14 November 2023 and completed with the Super Six on 26 May 2024. Edo Queens won their first title after finishing top of the Super Six table.

This season saw the return of Super Falcons great Onome Ebi to the league as she joined Naija Ratels briefly.

== Teams ==
=== Team changes ===
Four teams got promoted as the teams were increased to 16 from 14.

Promoted from 2022–2023 NWFL Championship	Relegated from 2022–2023 NWFL Premiership
Ekiti Queens; Remo Stars Ladies; Dannaz Ladies; Sunshine Queens	Osun Babes; Ibom Angels

=== Stadiums and locations ===
Clubs	Stadium	City
Adamawa Queens	Pantami Stadium	Yola
Abia Angels	Umuahia Township Stadium; Enyimba International Stadium	Umuahia
Bayelsa Queens	Yenagoa Township Stadium	Yenagoa
Confluence Queens	Edo University Stadium, Iyamho	Lokoja
Dannaz Ladies	Onikan Stadium	Lagos
Delta Queens	Stephen Keshi Stadium	Asaba
Edo Queens	Samuel Ogbemudia Stadium	Benin City
Ekiti Queens	Oluyemi Kayode Stadium	Ado-Ekiti
Heartland Queens	Dan Anyiam Stadium	Owerri
Naija Ratels	Aguiyi Ironsi Pitch	Abuja
Nasarawa Amazons	Lafia Township Stadium	Lafia
Remo Stars Ladies	Remo Stadium	Ikenne
Rivers Angels	Adokiye Amiesimaka Stadium	Port Harcourt
Robo	Onikan Stadium	Lagos
Royal Queens	Warri Township Stadium	Warri
Sunshine Queens	Akure Township Stadium	Akure

== Regular season ==
=== Group A ===
==== Table ====
Pos	Team	Pld	W	D	L	GF	GA	GD	Pts	Qualification
1	Nasarawa Amazons	14	8	3	3	21	7	+14	27	Play-offs
2	Confluence Queens	14	7	4	3	13	7	+6	25	Play-offs
3	Heartland Queens	14	7	3	4	20	11	+9	24	Play-offs
4	Dannaz Ladies	14	5	3	6	15	18	−3	18	
5	Naija Ratels	14	5	2	7	15	19	−4	17	
6	Adamawa Queens	14	5	2	7	13	17	−4	17	
7	Abia Angels	14	4	2	8	11	20	−9	14	
8	Royal Queens	14	3	5	6	7	16	−9	14	Relegated

Source: TheNWFL

==== Results ====
Home \ Away	ABA	ADA	CON	DAN	HEA	RAT	NAS	ROY
Abia Angels		3–2	0–2	3–1	1–2	1–0	0–1	0–0
Adamawa Queens	2–1		0–1	1–0	2–1	2–0	2–1	0–0
Confluence Queens	2–0	2–0		0–0	2–1	1–0	0–0	1–0
Dannaz Ladies	1–0	0–0	4–2		2–0	2–0	0–0	2–1
Heartland Queens	4–1	3–0	0–0	2–1		2–1	1–0	4–0
Naija Ratels	3–0	2–1	1–0	3–1	0–0		1–3	3–0
Nasarawa Amazons	0–0	2–1	1–0	3–1	1–0	5–0		4–0
Royal Queens	0–1	1–0	0–0	3–0	0–0	1–1	1–0	

Source: TheNWFL
Legend: Blue = home team win; Yellow = draw; Red = away team win.

=== Group B ===
==== Table ====
Pos	Team	Pld	W	D	L	GF	GA	GD	Pts	Qualification
1	Rivers Angels	14	8	3	3	19	13	+6	27	Play-offs
2	Edo Queens	14	7	2	5	20	16	+4	23	Play-offs
3	Bayelsa Queens	14	6	4	4	17	10	+7	22	Play-offs
4	Robo Queens	14	6	4	4	16	17	−1	22	
5	Remo Stars Ladies	14	5	3	6	17	17	0	18	
6	Delta Queens	14	4	5	5	12	11	+1	17	
7	Ekiti Queens	14	4	2	8	9	18	−9	14	
8	Sunshine Queens	14	4	1	9	15	23	−8	13	Relegated

Source: TheNWFL

==== Results ====
Home \ Away	BAY	DEL	EDO	EKI	REM	RIV	ROB	SUN
Bayelsa Queens		1–0	3–0	2–0	3–1	1–1	1–2	2–0
Delta Queens	1–0		1–1	2–1	1–1	2–0	1–1	3–1
Edo Queens	0–0	1–0		3–1	1–0	4–1	4–1	4–2
Ekiti Queens	0–1	0–0	1–0		2–1	2–0	0–0	1–0
Remo Stars Ladies	1–1	1–0	2–0	4–1		1–1	1–0	2–1
Rivers Angels	1–0	1–0	3–1	2–0	2–0		1–1	3–0
Robo Queens	2–1	0–0	1–0	2–0	2–1	1–2		3–2
Sunshine Queens	1–1	2–1	0–1	1–0	2–1	0–1	3–0	

Source: TheNWFL
Legend: Blue = home team win; Yellow = draw; Red = away team win.

== Championship round ==
A championship round involving the top three teams from the two groups was held to determine the league champion. It commenced on 18 May. All matches were played at Samson Siasia Stadium in Yenagoa and Nembe Stadium in Nembe.

Pos	Team	Pld	W	D	L	GF	GA	GD	Pts	Qualification
1	Edo Queens	5	3	1	1	11	5	+6	10	Champions/CAF WCL
2	Rivers Angels	5	2	3	0	6	3	+3	9	
3	Bayelsa Queens	5	2	3	0	5	2	+3	9	
4	Nasarawa Amazons	5	1	2	2	1	2	−1	5	
5	Heartland Queens	5	0	3	2	2	6	−4	3	
6	Confluence Queens	5	1	0	4	3	10	−7	3	

Source: TheNWFL

Home \ Away	BAY	CON	EDO	HEA	NAS	RIV
Bayelsa Queens		2–0	1–1		1–0	
Confluence Queens				2–0		
Edo Queens		5–1		3–1	1–0	
Heartland Queens	0–0					1–1
Nasarawa Amazons		1–0		0–0		0–0
Rivers Angels	1–1	2–0	2–1			

Source: TheNWFL
Legend: Blue = home team win; Yellow = draw; Red = away team win.

== Top scorers ==
As of 26 May 2024

Rank	Player	Club	Goals
1	(Nigeria) Ijamilusi Folashade	Robo Queens	8
2	(Nigeria) Ojiyovwi Kesiena	Nasarawa Amazons	7
2	(Nigeria) Goodness Osigwe	Edo Queens	7
2	(Nigeria) Igboamalu Chinyere	Bayelsa Queens	7
5	(Nigeria) Isaac Delight	Dannaz Ladies	6
5	(Nigeria) Okah Adaobi	Remo Stars Ladies	6
5	(Nigeria) Emem Essien	Edo Queens	6
8	(Nigeria) Chinedu Chinaka	Heartland Queens	5
8	(Nigeria) Ezekiel Motunrayo	Rivers Angels	5
8	(Nigeria) Mamudu Mary	Confluence Queens	5
8	(Nigeria) Adugbe Olamide	Rivers Angels	5

== Season's awards ==
Award	Winner	Club
League Topscorer	(Nigeria) Ijamilusi Folashade	Robo Queens
Goalkeeper of the Season	(Nigeria) Morufa Ademola	Rivers Angels
