= 2020–21 NWFL Premiership =

2020-21 season of top-flight Nigerian women's football / soccer league

Nigeria Women Football League Premiership
- Season: 2020–21
- Dates: 9 December 2020 – 11 May 2021
- Champions: Rivers Angels (7th title)
- Relegated: Ibom Angels; DreamStar Ladies
- CAF Women's Champions League: Rivers Angels
- Matches: 112
- Goals: 247 (2.21 per match)
- Top goalscorer: Gift Monday (10 goals)
- Biggest home win: FC Robo 5–0 Royal Queens (3 March 2021)
- Biggest away win: Royal Queens 1–3 Bayelsa Queens (24 March 2021)
- Highest scoring: Rivers Angels 6–2 Delta Queens (16 December 2020)
- Longest winning run: Bayelsa Queens & Rivers Angels (5 matches)
- Longest unbeaten run: Rivers Angels (8 matches)
- Longest winless run: Abia Angels (9 matches)
- Longest losing run: Ibom Angels (7 matches)
- All statistics correct as of 11 May 2021.

The 2020–21 NWFL Premiership was the 31st season of Nigeria women's top-flight association football league and the first since its renaming. The season began December 9, 2020.

This season saw 14 teams competing as the number of clubs were expanded from 12. Adamawa Queens, Ibom Angels and Heartland Queens failed to meet the deadline for club licensing and registration and where subsequently relegated to the NWFL Championship. They were replaced by Dream Stars Ladies and Osun Babes who were initially relegated from the 2019 season. Pro-league champions Olori Babes, were promoted and renamed Royal Queens, Pelican Stars were also promoted from the Pro-league.

On 25 April 2021, Rivers Angels won the Super Six tournament, clinching their 7th title and qualifying for the maiden CAF Women's Champions League. Subsequently, on 11 May, Ibom Angels and DreamStar Ladies were confirmed relegated, the later eliminated on goal difference.

== Format ==
This season saw a return to the straight table format without the clubs divided into groups since the 2014 season. All 14 teams were to play each other home and away to decide the league champions.

On 5 April, the NWFL board and the 14 clubs participating in the league agreed that the top six clubs at the end of the first round would play in a "Super Six" series to determine the league champions, while the bottom four clubs at the end of the same period would battle for survival in a play-off, with the last two teams at the end of the series relegated. The decision was taken due to the inaugural CAF Women's Champions League due to begin in May, so as to enter the country's representatives.

== Clubs ==
Team	Stadium	Town/City
Abia Angels	Umuahia Township Stadium	Port Harcourt
Bayelsa Queens	Samson Siasia Stadium	Yenagoa
Confluence Queens	Confluence Stadium	Lokoja
Delta Queens	Agbor Township Stadium	Agbor
Dream Stars Ladies	Agege Stadium	Lagos
Edo Queens	University of Benin Sports Complex Samuel Ogbemudia Stadium	Benin City
Ibom Angels	Godswill Akpabio International Stadium	Uyo
Nasarawa Amazons F.C.	Lafia Township Stadium	Lafia
Osun Babes	Osogbo City Stadium	Osogbo
Pelican Stars	U. J. Esuene Stadium	Calabar
Rivers Angels	Sharks Stadium	Port Harcourt
Robo	Legacy Pitch	Lagos
Royal Queens	Warri Township Stadium	Warri
Sunshine Queens	Akure Township Stadium	Akure

== Regular season ==
Pos	Team	Pld	W	D	L	GF	GA	GD	Pts	Qualification
1	Bayelsa Queens	13	10	1	2	24	11	+13	31	Championship play-offs
2	Delta Queens	13	9	2	2	14	8	+6	29	Championship play-offs
3	Rivers Angels	13	8	4	1	23	10	+13	28	Championship play-offs
4	Edo Queens	13	7	2	4	17	11	+6	23	Championship play-offs
5	Robo	13	7	1	5	23	13	+10	22	Championship play-offs
6	Sunshine Queens	13	6	2	5	14	7	+7	20	Championship play-offs
7	Confluence Queens	13	5	4	4	9	9	0	19	
8	Osun Babes	13	5	2	6	11	11	0	17	
9	Nasarawa Amazons	13	5	2	6	10	12	−2	17	
10	Royal Queens	13	4	1	8	11	20	−9	13	
11	Pelican Stars	13	3	3	7	10	22	−12	12	Relegation play-offs
12	Abia Angels	13	3	2	8	9	16	−7	11	Relegation play-offs
13	Ibom Angels	13	3	1	9	9	17	−8	10	Relegation play-offs
14	DreamStar Ladies	13	1	3	9	8	25	−17	6	Relegation play-offs

Source: RSSSF

== Playoffs ==
=== Championship playoffs ===
The top six teams at the end of the regular season engaged each other in a round-robin playoff between 19 and 25 April in order to decide the league champion and representative at the maiden CAF Women's Champions League. All matches were played at the Dipo Dina International Stadium in Ijebu-Ode.

Pos	Team	Pld	W	D	L	GF	GA	GD	Pts	Qualification	RIV	DEL	FCR	SUN	BAY	EDO
1	Rivers Angels (C)	5	3	2	0	12	0	+12	11	Qualified to the CAF CL	—	—	0–0	—	—	4–0
2	Delta Queens	5	2	3	0	5	2	+3	9		0–0	—	—	—	0–0	—
3	Robo	5	2	2	1	7	2	+5	8		—	1–1	—	0–1	2–0	—
4	Sunshine Queens	5	2	1	2	4	8	−4	7		0–4	0–2	—	—	—	2–1
5	Bayelsa Queens	5	1	2	2	4	7	−3	5		0–4	—	—	1–1	—	—
6	Edo Queens	5	0	0	5	2	15	−13	0		—	1–2	0–4	—	0–3	—

Source: TheNWFL
(C) Champions

=== Relegation playoffs ===
The bottom four teams at the end of the regular season engaged each other in a round-robin playoff between 8 and 11 May to decide the last two clubs to be relegated. All matches were played at the University of Benin Sports Complex in Benin City.

Pos	Team	Pld	W	D	L	GF	GA	GD	Pts	Qualification	PEL	ABI	DRE	IBO
1	Pelican Stars	3	1	2	0	5	3	+2	5		—	—	4–2	0–0
2	Abia Angels	3	1	1	1	4	4	0	4 (Note: Ranked on goal difference: Abia Angels 0, DreamStar Ladies -1.)		1–1	—	2–3	—
3	DreamStar Ladies (R)	3	1	1	1	7	8	−1	4	Relegation to NWFL Championship	—	—	—	2–2
4	Ibom Angels (R)	3	0	2	1	2	3	−1	2	Relegation to NWFL Championship	—	0–1	—	—

Source: TheNWFL
(R) Relegated

== Statistical leaders ==
=== Top scorers ===
This does not include playoffs.

Rank	Player	Club	Goals
1	(Nigeria) Gift Monday	Robo	10
2	(Nigeria) Reuben Charity	Bayelsa Queens	8
3	(Nigeria) Elizabeth Zirike	Edo Queens	6

=== Hat-tricks ===
Player	For	Against	Score	Date
(Nigeria) Gift Monday	Robo	Osun Babes	3–1	16 December 2020

== Individual awards ==
=== Monthly awards ===
Month	Manager of the Month		Player of the Month		References
Month	Manager	Club	Player	Club	References
December			(Nigeria) Gift Monday	Robo	
January					
February	(Nigeria) Edwin Okon	Rivers Angels	(Nigeria) Reuben Charity	Bayelsa Queens	
