= 2021–22 NWFL Premiership =

2021-22 season of top-flight Nigerian women's football league

Nigeria Women Football League Premiership
- Season: 2021–22
- Dates: 8 December 2021 – May 2022
- Champions: Bayelsa Queens (5th title)
- Promoted: Naija Ratels; Adamawa Queens
- Matches: 99
- Goals: 218 (2.2 per match)
- Biggest home win: Bayelsa Queens 5–0 Abia Angels (30 March 2022)
- Biggest away win: Royal Queens 0–4 Rivers Angels (22 December 2021)
- Highest scoring: Naija Ratels 5–2 Adamawa Queens (23 December 2022)
- All statistics correct as of 22 May 2022.

The 2021–22 NWFL Premiership was the 32nd season of the NWFL Premiership, Nigeria's top-flight women's association football league and the second season since its rebranding. The season commenced on 8 December 2021 and ended May 2022.

This season saw a return to the abridged format whereby the fourteen clubs are divided into two groups of seven teams each whereafter a "Super Six" tournament will decide the league champions. Defending champions Rivers Angels finished third at the Championship play-offs.

Bayelsa Queens won their 5th NWFL Premiership title after emerging champions of the Super Six tournament.

== Clubs ==
Naija Ratels and Adamawa Queens were promoted to the top-flight after winning the NWFL Championship play-offs; the latter having failed to compete the previous season due to late licensing and registration. They replaced DreamStar Ladies and Ibom Angels who were relegated after finishing bottom of the group at the previous season's relegation playoffs.

Team	Stadium	City
Adamawa Queens	Pantami Stadium (Note: Adamawa Queens will play their home matches at Pantami Stadium in Gombe since no stadiums in Yola meets the stadium requirements.)	Yola
Abia Angels	Umuahia Township Stadium	Umuahia
Bayelsa Queens	Nembe City Stadium	Yenagoa
Confluence Queens	Confluence Stadium Ilorin Township Stadium	Lokoja
Delta Queens	Stephen Keshi Stadium	Asaba
Edo Queens	University of Benin Sports Complex Samuel Ogbemudia Stadium	Benin City
Naija Ratels	Area 10 Sports Complex (Note: Naija Ratels are to play home matches at the Area 10 Sports Complex in Abuja until completion of their stadium.)	Makurdi
Nasarawa Amazons F.C.	Lafia Township Stadium	Lafia
Osun Babes	Lanre Leke Stadium (Note: Osun Babes will play their home matches at Lanre Leke Stadium, Ileogbo as their home stadium, Osogbo Stadium, Osogbo was declared unfit to host matches by the league body.)	Osogbo
Pelican Stars	U. J. Esuene Stadium	Calabar
Rivers Angels	UNIPORT Sports Complex	Port Harcourt
Robo	Legacy Pitch	Lagos
Royal Queens	Warri Township Stadium	Warri
Sunshine Queens	Akure Township Stadium	Akure

== Regular season ==
=== Group A ===
Pos	Team	Pld	W	D	L	GF	GA	GD	Pts	Qualification
1	Nasarawa Amazons	12	9	0	3	24	6	+18	27	Championship play-offs
2	Edo Queens	12	8	2	2	22	8	+14	26	Championship play-offs
3	Naija Ratels	12	5	3	4	19	15	+4	18	Championship play-offs
4	Osun Babes	12	5	2	5	9	12	−3	17	
5	Confluence Queens	12	4	4	4	10	9	+1	16	
6	Adamawa Queens	12	4	0	8	9	20	−11	12	
7	Pelican Stars	12	1	1	10	2	25	−23	4	Relegated

Source: TheNWFL

==== Results ====
Home \ Away	ADA	CON	EDO	RAT	NAS	OSU	PEL
Adamawa Queens		1–0	0–2	2–3	0–1	2–1	1–0
Confluence Queens	1–0		1–1	0–0	1–0	0–0	4–0
Edo Queens	2–0	2–0		2–2	2–1	3–0	4–0
Naija Ratels	5–2	2–1	0–3		0–1	2–0	3–0
Nasarawa Amazons	4–0	2–0	2–0	3–2		4–0	3–0
Osun Babes	1–0	0–1	2–0	0–0	1–0		2–0
Pelican Stars	0–1	1–1	0–1	1–0	0–3	0–2	

Source: TheNWFL
Legend: Blue = home team win; Yellow = draw; Red = away team win.

=== Group B ===
Pos	Team	Pld	W	D	L	GF	GA	GD	Pts	Qualification
1	Bayelsa Queens	12	7	3	2	21	5	+16	24	Championship play-offs
2	Rivers Angels	12	7	2	3	17	7	+10	23	Championship play-offs
3	Delta Queens	12	6	5	1	17	7	+10	23	Championship play-offs
4	Robo Queens	12	6	1	5	14	10	+4	19	
5	Abia Angels	12	2	5	5	3	17	−14	11	
6	Royal Queens	12	3	1	8	10	20	−10	10	
7	Sunshine Queens	12	2	1	9	6	22	−16	7	Relegated

Source: TheNWFL

==== Results ====
Home \ Away	ABI	BAY	DEL	RIV	ROB	ROY	SUN
Abia Angels		0–0	0–0	0–0	1–0	0–0	1–0
Bayelsa Queens	5–0		1–1	1–0	2–0	3–0	3–0
Delta Queens	2–0	2–2		0–0	2–1	5–1	1–0
Rivers Angels	4–0	1–0	1–0		1–0	1–3	2–1
Robo Queens	2–0	1–0	0–0	2–1		3–1	3–0
Royal Queens	3–0	0–1	0–1	0–4	0–1		2–0
Sunshine Queens	1–1	0–3	1–3	0–2	2–1	1–0	

Source: TheNWFL
Legend: Blue = home team win; Yellow = draw; Red = away team win.

== Play-offs ==
The top six teams at the end of the regular season engaged each other in a round-robin playoff also known as the Super Six between 16 and 22 May in order to decide the league champion and representative at the 2022 CAF Women's Champions League. All matches are played at the Samuel Ogbemudia Stadium and UNIBEN Sports Complex in Benin City.

Pos	Team	Pld	W	D	L	GF	GA	GD	Pts	Qualification
1	Bayelsa Queens	5	5	0	0	11	3	+8	15	Champion/Qualified to the CAF CL
2	Nasarawa Amazons	5	3	0	2	6	4	+2	9	
3	Rivers Angels	5	2	2	1	5	3	+2	8	
4	Edo Queens	5	1	2	2	2	3	−1	5	
5	Delta Queens	5	1	2	2	1	2	−1	5	
6	Naija Ratels	5	0	0	5	0	10	−10	0	

Source: TheNWFL

Home \ Away	BAY	DEL	EDO	RAT	NAS	RIV
Bayelsa Queens		1–0	2–1		2–1	2–1
Delta Queens			0–0			
Edo Queens				1–0	0–1	0–0
Naija Ratels	0–4	0–1				0–2
Nasarawa Amazons		1–0		2–0		1–2
Rivers Angels		0–0				

Source: TheNWFL

== Statistical leaders ==
=== Top scorers ===
As of 23 April 2021

Rank	Player	Club	Goals
1	(Nigeria) Gift Monday	Robo	10
2	(Nigeria) Reuben Charity	Bayelsa Queens	8
3	(Nigeria) Elizabeth Zirike	Edo Queens	6

=== Top assists ===
Rank	Player	Club	Assists
1	(Nigeria) Joy Jerry	Bayelsa Queens F.C.	6

=== Hat-tricks ===
Player	For	Against	Score	Date
(Nigeria) Mercy Omokwu	Confluence Queens	Pelican Stars	4–0	8 December 2021
(Nigeria) Motunrayo Ezekiel	Naija Ratels	Pelican Stars	3–0	23 February 2022
(Nigeria) Gift Monday	Bayelsa Queens	Naija Ratels	4–0	17 May 2022

== Season's awards ==
Award	Winner	Club
Player of the Season	(Nigeria) Gift Monday	Bayelsa Queens
League Topscorer	(Nigeria) Gift Monday	Bayelsa Queens
Goalkeeper of the Season	(Cameroon) Bawou Gabrielle	Bayelsa Queens
