= 2026 Nigeria Women's Federation Cup =

2026 Women's Federation Cup
Women's President Federation Cup

Tournament details
- Country: Nigeria
- Dates: 6 May — 11 July 2026

Final positions
- Champions: Nasarawa Amazons (3rd title)
- Runners-up: Heartland Queens

Tournament statistics
- Matches played: 28
- Goals scored: 109 (3.89 per match)

The 2026 Nigeria Women's Federation Cup known officially as the 2026 Women's President Federation Cup was the 30th edition of the main knockout tournament for women's football in Nigeria, the Nigeria Women's Federation Cup.

Rivers Angels are two times defending champions.

On 11 July, Nasarawa Amazons won their third title, defeating Heartland Queens 5–4 on penalties after the regulation time ended 1–1.

== Format ==
36 clubs from 21 states and the FCT entered the competition.

The competition began with the National playoffs which involves the weakest 8 teams, the winners joined the remaining 28 teams at the Round of 32 then it continued as an elimination round up to the final.

Matches were played 90 minutes, tied fixtures goes straight to penalty shoot-out. All matches were played at neutral venues.

== Participating teams ==
State	Team(s)
Abia	Ahudiyannem Queens
Abia	Abia Angels
Akwa-Ibom	Ibom Angels
Akwa-Ibom	Solo Wonders
Bayelsa	Bayelsa Queens
Bayelsa	Bayelsa Princesses
Delta	Delta Queens
Delta	Royal Queens
Ebonyi	Esthington
Edo	Edo Queens
Edo	Fortress Ladies
Ekiti	FUOYE Queens
Enugu	Enugu Rangers Women
Enugu	Zorha Queens
Imo	Heartland Queens
Imo	Ikukuoma Queens
Kaduna	Gallant Queens
Kaduna	Kada Queens
Kogi	Confluence Queens
Kwara	Model Queens
Kwara	Moje Queens
Lagos	Robo Queens
Lagos	Ghetto Tiger Ladies
Nasarawa	Nasarawa Amazons
Ogun	Remo Stars Ladies
Ondo	Sunshine Queens
Ondo	Onimarg FC
Osun	Osun Babes
Oyo	Pacesetter Queens
Oyo	Dragon Fury Ladies
Plateau	Mighty Jets Mata
Plateau	Plateau United Queens
Rivers	Rivers Angels
Rivers	Osklean Ladies
FCT	Naija Ratels
FCT	NAF Queens

== National playoff ==
Matches were played on 6 May.

Team 1	Score	Team 2
NAF Queens	3–1	Model Queens
Kada Queens	1–3	Mighty Jets Mata
Bayelsa Princesses	1–2	Ikukuoma Queens
Zorha Queens	1–2	Esthington

== Round of 32 ==
Matches were played on 25 May.

Team 1	Score	Team 2
Rivers Angels	12–0	NAF Queens
Abia Angels	2–0	Ikukuoma Queens
Robo Queens	3–2	Enugu Rangers Women
Remo Stars Ladies	3–0	Onimarg FC
Ahudiyannem Queens	5–0	Moje Queens
Heartland Queens	6–0	Dragon Fury Ladies
Ibom Angels	2–0	Fortress Ladies
Pacesetter Queens	0–1	Bayelsa Queens
Osun Babes	w/o	Plateau United Queens
Sunshine Queens	5–0	Solo Wonders
Confluence Queens	w/o	Gallant Queens
FUOYE Queens	w/o	Esthington
Delta Queens	5–0	Royal Queens
Edo Queens	3–1	Ghetto Tiger Ladies
Naija Ratels	5–2	Mighty Jets Mata
Osklean FC Queens	0–4	Nasarawa Amazons

== Round of 16 ==
Matches were played on 2 June.

Team 1	Score	Team 2
Rivers Angels	3–1	Abia Angels
Robo Queens	5–3	Remo Stars Ladies
Ahudiyannem Queens	0–4	Heartland Queens
Ibom Angels	1–1 (5–4 p)	Bayelsa Queens
Plateau United Queens	0–2	Sunshine Queens
Confluence Queens	8–0	Esthington
Delta Queens	0–4	Edo Queens
Naija Ratels	1–1 (3–4 p)	Nasarawa Amazons

== Quarter-finals ==
Matches were played on 17 June.

Team 1	Score	Team 2
Rivers Angels	0–1	Robo Queens
Heartland Queens	2–2 (4–2 p)	Ibom Angels
Sunshine Queens	1–0	Confluence Queens
Edo Queens	0–0 (3–5 p)	Nasarawa Amazons

== Semi-finals ==
Matches were played on 24 June.

Team 1	Score	Team 2
Robo Queens	1–2	Heartland Queens
Sunshine Queens	1–2	Nasarawa Amazons

24 June 2026	Robo Queens	1–2	Heartland Queens	Samuel Ogbemudia Stadium, Benin City
16:00 (UTC+1)	Tosin Rafiu (?)	Report	Umejiaku Oluebube 18'; Faith Samson 87'

24 June 2026	Sunshine Queens	1–2	Nasarawa Amazons	Nnamdi Azikiwe Stadium, Enugu
16:00 (UTC+1)	?? 90+3'	Report	Ayatsea Hembafan 18'; Jumoke Alani 90+4'

== Final ==
The final was played on 11 July at the Stephen Keshi Stadium in Asaba. Heartland Queens were competing in their first ever final against two-time champions Nasarawa Amazons who were playing in their fifth final.

Team 1	Score	Team 2
Heartland Queens	1–1 (4–5 p)	Nasarawa Amazons

11 July 2026	Heartland Queens	1–1 (4–5 p)	Nasarawa Amazons	Stephen Keshi Stadium, Asaba
12:00 (UTC+1)	Chizoba 47'	Report	Okah 65'

== See also ==
- 2026 Nigeria Federation Cup
- 2025–26 Nigeria Premier Football League
- 2025–26 Nigeria National League
- 2025–26 NWFL Premiership
