= 2019 Nigeria Women's Cup =

2019 Aiteo Cup (women)
Nigeria Women's Cup

Tournament details
- Country: Nigeria
- Dates: 12 June – 28 July 2019
- Teams: 23

Final positions
- Champions: Nasarawa Amazons

Tournament statistics
- Matches played: 21
- Goals scored: 73 (3.48 per match)
- All statistics correct as of 30 August 2019.

The 2019 Nigeria Women's Cup (known as the 2019 AITEO Women's Cup for sponsorship reasons) was the 26th edition of the Nigeria Women's Cup, the main single-elimination women's football tournament in Nigeria.

The defending champions were Rivers Angels, after they defeated Ibom Angels in the previous final.

Twenty-one teams contested the trophy, with seven teams receiving byes to the second round.

== Schedule ==
The rounds of the 2019 competition were scheduled as follows:

Round	Matches
First round	12–13 June 2019
Second round	20 & 27 June 2019
Quarter-finals	30 June – 1 July 2019
Semi-finals	5 July 2019
Final	28 July 2019 at Ahmadu Bello Stadium, Kaduna

== Matches ==
A total of twenty-three matches were played, starting with the first round on 12 June 2019 and culminating with the final on 28 July 2019 at the Ahmadu Bello Stadium, Kaduna.

== First round ==
Eight matches were played on 12 and 13 June 2019. Rivers Angels, Adamawa Queens, Sunshine Queens, Delta Queens, Nasarawa Amazons, Confluence Queens and Ibom Angels all received byes to the second round.

Team 1	Score	Team 2
Capital City Dove	0–5	FC Robo
Osun Babes	w/o	Vera Gold Angels (Note: Osun Babes and Vera Gold Angels both later received byes to the second round.)
Solo Wonders	0–8	Bayelsa Queens
Crystal Academy	1–2	Pelican Stars
Edo Queens	20–0	JEF Queens
Olori Babes FC	3–2	Moje Queens
Young Talents 99	0–0 (4–3 p)	Fortress Ladies
Kaduna Queens	1–3	Abia Angels

== Second round ==
Eight matches were played on 20 and 27 June 2019. The nine first round winners joined the seven teams who received byes to the second round.

Team 1	Score	Team 2
Rivers Angels	1–1 (5–4 p)	Adamawa Queens
FC Robo	1–1(4–5 p)	Sunshine Queens
Osun Babes	0–2	Delta Queens
Vera Gold Angels	w/o	Bayelsa Queens
Nasarawa Amazons	4–2	Pelican Stars
Fortress Ladies	1–4	Confluence Queens
Abia Angels	1–2	Ibom Angels
Edo Queens	0–0 (5–4 p)	Olori Babes FC

== Quarter-finals ==
The eight winners of the second round played against each other, the matches were played on 30 June and 1 July 2019.

Team 1	Score	Team 2
Delta Queens	1–1(3–1 p)	Bayelsa Queens
Nasarawa Amazons	1–0	Edo Queens
Confluence Queens	0–2	Ibom Angels
Rivers Angels	2–0	Sunshine Queens

== Semi-finals ==
The two matches took place on 5 July 2019 at neutral venues.

5 July 2019

Nasarawa Amazons	0–0 (a.e.t.)	Ibom Angels
	Report
Penalties
	5–3

Nnamdi Azikiwe Stadium, Enugu
5 July 2019

Delta Queens	0–1	Rivers Angels
	Report	Ibinabo 64'

Abakaliki Township Stadium, Abakaliki

== Final ==
28 July 2019

Rivers Angels	0–0 (a.e.t.)	Nasarawa Amazons
	Report
Penalties
	4–5

Ahmadu Bello Stadium, Kaduna

2019 Aiteo Cup (women) winners

2nd title
