= 2024 Nigeria Women's Cup =

2024 President Federation Cup (women)
Nigeria Women's Cup

Tournament details
- Country: Nigeria
- Dates: 8 May - 29 June 2024

Final positions
- Champions: Rivers Angels (9th title)

Tournament statistics
- Matches played: 28
- Goals scored: 105 (3.75 per match)
- All statistics correct as of 30 June 2024.

The 2024 Nigeria Women's Cup known officially as the 2024 Women's President Federation Cup was the 28th edition of the main knockout tournament for women's football in Nigeria, the Nigeria Women's Cup.

Bayelsa Queens are the defending champions.

== Format ==
32 clubs from just 20 states entered the competition.

The competition begins with the Round of 32 up to the final.

Matches are played 90 minutes, tied fixtures goes straight to a penalty shoot-out.

== Round of 32 ==
The 32 clubs participated in this round. All matches were played on 8 and 9 May.

Team 1	Score	Team 2
8 May 2024
Plateau United Ladies	1–3	Honey Badgers
Gallant Babes	0–2	Osun Babes
Edo Queens	8–2	Kada Queens
Nasarawa Amazons	w/o	Suit de Queens
Dannaz Ladies	w/o	Mighty Jets Mata
Bayelsa Queens	w/o	Bright Future
Remo Stars Ladies	4–0	Oske Leans
Abia Angels	8–0	Castmong Ladies
Naija Ratels	7–0	ON Youth Academy
Robo Queens	3–0	Onimang FC
Kwara Ladies	3–1	Ahudiya Queens
Delta Queens	2–1	Fortress Ladies
Sunshine Queens	3–1	Green Foot
9 May 2024
Heartland Queens	3–0	Golden Sun
Confluence Queens	5–1	Delta Ladies
Ekiti Queens	0–3	Rivers Angels

== Round of 16 ==
All matches were played on 29 May.

Team 1	Score	Team 2
Bayelsa Queens	1–1 (5–6 p)	Nasarawa Amazons
Dannaz Ladies	0–1	Remo Stars Ladies
Abia Angels	0–4	Naija Ratels
Heartland Queens	0–2	Robo Queens
Kwara Ladies	0–7	Delta Queens
Sunshine Queens	2–0	Honey Badgers
Osun Babes	1–1 (4–3 p)	Confluence Queens
Edo Queens	1–4	Rivers Angels

== Quarter-final ==
Matches were played on 19 June.

Team 1	Score	Team 2
Nasarawa Amazons	1–1 (2–3 p)	Remo Stars Ladies
Naija Ratels	1–1 (5–4 p)	Robo Queens
Delta Queens	2–0	Sunshine Queens
Osun Babes	0–5	Rivers Angels

== Semi-final ==
Matches were held on 23 June.

Team 1	Score	Team 2
Delta Queens	1–2	Rivers Angels
Remo Stars Ladies	2–2 (6–7 p)	Naija Ratels

23 June 2024	Delta Queens	1–2	Rivers Angels	Awka City Stadium, Awka
09:00 (UTC+1)	Okpara Maureen 45'		Okpe 4'; Effiong 6'

23 June 2024	Remo Stars Ladies	2–2 (a.e.t.) (6–7 p)	Naija Ratels	Nnamdi Azikiwe Stadium, Enugu
09:00 (UTC+1)	Simi Okesiji 38'; Vincent Precious 54'

== Final ==
The final was played on 29 June at the Onikan Stadium in Lagos.

Team 1	Score	Team 2
Rivers Angels	1–0	Naija Ratels

29 June 2024	Rivers Angels	1–0	Naija Ratels	Onikan Stadium, Lagos
14:00 (UTC+1)	Blessing Okpe 45+3' (pen.)			Referee: Yemisi Akintoye
