= 2025 Nigeria Women's Cup =

2025 President Federation Cup (women)
Nigeria Women's Cup

Tournament details
- Country: Nigeria
- Dates: 5 March — 28 June
- Teams: 33

Final positions
- Champions: Rivers Angels (10th title)

Tournament statistics
- Matches played: 29
- Goals scored: 118 (4.07 per match)
- All statistics correct as of 28 June 2025.

The 2025 Nigeria Women's Cup known officially as the 2025 Women's President Federation Cup was the 29th edition of the main knockout tournament for women's football in Nigeria, the Nigeria Women's Cup.

Rivers Angels successfully defended their title, defeating Nasarawa Amazons on penalties to claim a record tenth title.

== Format ==
33 clubs from 21 states and the FCT entered the competition.

The competition began with the National playoffs, then the Round of 32 up to the final.

Matches are played 90 minutes, tied fixtures goes straight to penalty shoot-out.

== National playoff ==
Team 1	Score	Team 2
5 March 2025
First Mahi Babes (EBY)	w/o	Softlanding FC (ENU)

== Round of 32 ==
Team 1	Score	Team 2
5 April 2025
Gallant Queens (KAD)	1–4	First Mahi Babes (EBY)
Dannaz Ladies (LAG)	5–0	GP World (ANM)
Confluence Queens (KOG)	2–0	Ahudiyannem Queens (ABA)
Edo Queens (EDO)	12–0	Kada Queens (KAD)
Rivers Angels (RIV)	7–0	Moje Queens (KWA)
Remo Stars Ladies (OGU)	3–0	Plateau United Queens (PLA)
Delta Queens (DEL)	w/o	Jacklyn Angels (AKW)
Ibom Angels (AKW)	17–0	Sporting Angels (RIV)
Fortress Ladies (EDO)	1–1 (2–4 p)	Onimarg FC (OND)
Heartland Queens (IMO)	7–0	Crystal Stars (BAY)
Osun Babes (OSU)	3–0	N-Youth (FCT)
Adamawa Queens (ADA)	w/o	Unification FC (LAG)
Sunshine Queens (OND)	0–0 (8–7 p)	Castmog Ladies (OGU)
Bayelsa Queens (BAY)	2–1	Naija Ratels (FCT)
6 April 2025
Delta Babes (DEL)	0–1	Mighty Jets Mata (PLA)
Nasarawa Amazons (NAS)	6–0	Kwara Ladies (KWA)

== Round of 16 ==
Matches were played on 2 May.

Team 1	Score	Team 2
Onimarg FC (OND)	0–5	Heartland Queens (IMO)
Sunshine Queens (OND)	2–1	Confluence Queens(KOG)
Rivers Angels (RIV)	5–0	First Mahi Babes (EBY)
Remo Stars Ladies (OGU)	2–1	Dannaz Ladies (LAG)
Delta Queens (DEL)	0–1	Ibom Angels (AKW)
Osun Babes(OSU)	0–3	Edo Queens (EDO)
Mighty Jets Mata (PLA)	0–6	Unification FC (LAG)
Nasarawa Amazons (NAS)	2–1	Bayelsa Queens (BAY)

== Quarter-final ==
Matches were played on 7 May.

Team 1	Score	Team 2
Sunshine Queens (OND)	0–4	Nasarawa Amazons (NAS)
Edo Queens (EDO)	1–0	Unification FC (LAG)
Rivers Angels (RIV)	1–1 (3–1 p)	Remo Stars Ladies (OGU)
Ibom Angels (AKW)	1–1 (4–3 p)	Heartland Queens (IMO)

== Semi-final ==
Matches were held on 24 May.

Team 1	Score	Team 2
Edo Queens	0–2	Nasarawa Amazons
Rivers Angels	1–0	Ibom Angels

24 May 2025	Edo Queens	0–2	Nasarawa Amazons	PAAU Stadium, Anyigba
13:00 (UTC+1)			Hembafan Ayatsea 70'; Bibiana Odoh 88'

24 June 2025	Rivers Angels	1–0	Ibom Angels	Enyimba International Stadium, Aba
13:00 (UTC+1)	Aminat Folorunsho 63'

== Final ==
Match was played on 28 June 2025.

Team 1	Score	Team 2
Nasarawa Amazons	2–2 (2–4 p)	Rivers Angels

28 June 2025	Nasarawa Amazons	2–2 (2–4 p)	Rivers Angels	Onikan Stadium, Lagos
(UTC+1)	Shobowale 8', 20'	Report	Ajibade 57'; Afolabi 62'	Referee: Hannah Eliagwu
