= Sheroes Cup =

- 2020 logo
- Organiser(s): Ratels Sports Development Foundation
- Founded: 2019; 7 years ago
- Region: Nigeria; Cameroon; Ghana
- Teams: 12
- Current champions: Edo Queens FC

Sheroes Cup (formerly called Naija Ratels Pre-Season Championship then Flying Officers Cup) is an annual preseason tournament for women's association football teams in Africa. The competition usually feature elite teams from Nigeria Women Premier League, as well as neighboring African countries and is supported by the Nigeria Football Federation and Nigerian Women Football League. Since the first edition in 2019, it has been described as the biggest preseason tournament for women club football in Nigeria.

Just before the commencement of the second edition, it was rebranded as "Flying Officers Cup" to honor and immortalize the recently deceased Nigeria first-ever female combat helicopter pilot, Tolulope Arotile.

In 2021, there was a hundred per cent increase in the prize money from the 2020 edition. The first, second, third and fourth-placed teams are to receive ₦1,000,000, ₦500,000, ₦300,000 and ₦200,000 respectively.

In October 2022, it was renamed to "Sheroes Cup".

== History ==
The competition is founded and financed by Barrister Paul Edeh, through his sport firm domiciled in Benue State. For the first edition, twenty women football clubs in Nigeria was invited but only four decided to honour the invitation. The inaugural tournament was contested by hosts, Naija Ratels; top-tier teams, Nasarawa Amazons and Edo Queens; and lower pyramid team, Honey Badgers from Northern Nigerian state of Kaduna. Edo Queens emerged winners following a straight round robin format. All participating teams received free sporting souvenirs, including soccer balls and jerseys.

The second edition saw the introduction of prize money, as well as removing registration fees due to the financial impacts of COVID-19 on participating teams. It was also officially ratified by the Nigeria Women Football League. The tournament venue was relocated from Benue State to Abuja.Bayelsa Queens emerged winners through a more traditional initial group phase, then elimination stages matches format.

The third edition saw the ratification of an organizing committee that included many major national stakeholders in women's football. The prize money was also significantly increased and the tournament was billed to involve other African countries for the first time. The number of teams was also increased to 12. The competition is scheduled to start on 22 August.

=== Top scorers ===
Year	Player	Team	Goals
2019	Odueke Omotoke	Edo Queens F.C.	
2020	Joy Omewa	Confluence Queens FC	6 goals
2021		[[ ]]	
2022	Chinaza Agoh	Delta Queens FC	6 goals
2023	Emem Essien	Edo Queens FC	5 goals

=== Most valuable player ===
Year	Player	Team
2019		
2020	Joy Jerry	Bayelsa Queens
2021		

== Results ==
Year	Winner	Score	Runner-up
2019	Edo Queens	3–2	Nasarawa Amazons
2020	Bayelsa Queens	1–0	Nasarawa Amazons
2021	Robo Queens	1–0	Delta Queens
2022	Delta Queens	0–0 (5–4 p)	Edo Queens
2023	Naija Ratels FC	0–1	Edo Queens
2024	Remo Stars Ladies	1–1 (5–3 p)	Abia Angels
