= Chinaza Agoh =

Nigerian footballer (born 2004)

Personal information
- Full name: Chinaza Favour Agoh
- Date of birth: 27 November 2004 (age 21)
- Place of birth: Nigeria
- Position: Forward

Team information
- Current team: ZED FC
- Number: 9

Senior career*
Years	Team	Apps	(Gls)
2022–2024	Delta Queens	+19	(15)
2024	Al-Shabab	5	(0)
2024–	ZED FC	7	(14)

International career
–2024	Nigeria U20		
- * Club domestic league appearances and goals as of 13 November 2024

Chinaza Favour Agoh (born 27 November 2004) is a Nigerian professional footballer who plays as a striker for Egyptian Women's Premier League club ZED FC.

== Club career ==
=== Delta Queens ===
She won the 2022 Sheroes Cup as part of Delta Queens, securing the title of top scorer with a tally of six goals throughout the tournament.

In the final of the 2022–23 NWFL Premiership she scored a brace against Bayelsa Queens to win the 6th title for the club.

After being voted the Most Valuable Player in the Nigeria Women's Football League Premiership for the 2022/2023 season, Agoh and her club the title holders competed in the 2023 CAF Women's Champions League WAFU Zone B Qualifiers. Despite clinching silver, their performance wasn't sufficient to qualify for the Champions League.

=== Al-Shabab: (2024) ===
On 22 February 2024, Al-Shabab announced the signing of the Falconets striker Agoh. She made her professional debut for the club on 16 March 2024 in a 2–0 win against Al Qadsiah.

=== ZED: (2024–) ===
In October 2024, Agoh joined ZED FC in the Egyptian Women's Premier League.

== International career ==
Agoh is a current Nigerian youth international.

== Honours ==
Delta Queens

- NWFL Premiership Champions: 2022–23
- Sheroes Cup Champions: 2022

Individual

- NWFL Premiership Most Valuable Player: 2022–23
- Sheroes Cup Top Scorer: 2022
