= Fatima Oloko =

Nigerian footballer (born 2008)

Personal information
- Full name: Fatima Ugbene Oloko
- Date of birth: 2 February 2008 (age 18)
- Place of birth: Ogoja, Nigeria
- Height: 1.82 m (6 ft 0 in)
- Position: Goalkeeper

Team information
- Current team: Abia Angels
- Number: 22

Senior career*
Years	Team	Apps	(Gls)
2024−2025	Rivers Angels		
2025−	Abia Angels		

International career^{‡}
- Nigeria U17
- Nigeria U20
2026-	Nigeria	0	(0)
- * Club domestic league appearances and goals ‡ National team caps and goals as of 15 August 2026

Fatima Ugbene Oloko (born 2 February 2008) is a Nigerian footballer who plays as a goalkeeper for Abia Angels and the Nigeria national team.

== Club career ==
Oloko spent 2024−2025 season with Rivers Angels as an unused substitute, where her team won the Nigeria Women's Cup. At the beginning of the 2025−2026 season, she moved to Abia Angels. Oloko kept twelve clean sheets on her way to becoming first-choice goalkeeper in her first season for the club, helping them qualify for the championship round for the first time and reach fourth place there. For her performances, she was awarded the NWFL Golden Glove award.

== International career ==
In February 2026, Oloko received her first call up to the senior Negeria team.

On 10 July 2026, Oloko was included in the 25-player Nigerian squad for the Women's Africa Cup of Nations.

== Honours ==
Rivers Angels

- Nigeria Women's Cup: 2025
