= Favour Emmanuel =

Nigerian footballer (born 2002)

Personal information
- Full name: Favour Chinagorom Emmanuel
- Date of birth: 7 September 2002 (age 24)
- Place of birth: Port Harcourt, Nigeria
- Height: 1.72 m (5 ft 8 in)
- Position: Defensive midfielder

Team information
- Current team: Lokomotiv Moscow
- Number: 24

Senior career*
Years	Team	Apps	(Gls)
- Abia Angels
2022–2023	Bayelsa Queens		
2024	Lokomotiv Moscow	22	(1)
2025	San Diego Wave	2	(0)
2025–	Lokomotiv Moscow		

International career
- Nigeria U17
- * Club domestic league appearances and goals as of 10 May 2025

Favour Chinagorom Emmanuel (born 7 September 2002) is a Nigerian professional footballer who plays as a defensive midfielder for Russian Women's Football Championship club Lokomotiv Moscow.

== Club career ==
Born in Port Harcourt, Emmanuel played for the Abia Angels before joining the Bayelsa Queens in 2022, helping win the NWFL Premiership in her first season. She also made five starts during the 2022 CAF Women's Champions League as they came in third place.

Lokomotiv Moscow announced Emmanuel's signing on 27 December 2023. In the 2024 season, she appeared in all 22 league games (19 starts) and scored one goal as Lokomotiv finished fourth in the Russian Women's Football Championship. She also helped win the 2024 Russian Women's Cup, scoring three goals in four games. She was named the club's Player of the Month in April and June.

On 20 January 2025, the NWSL's San Diego Wave FC announced that they had signed Emmanuel to a two-year contract, with a club option for an additional year. She joined Chiamaka Okwuchukwu, signed the week before, as the second Nigerian player on the team. Emmanuel made only two appearances, one as a starter (a 2–0 loss to the Kansas City Current), before San Diego announced a mutual contract termination on 29 May 2025.

Emmanuel returned to Lokomotiv Moscow on 18 July 2025, signing a contract through 2026.

== International career ==
Emmanuel was called up to the Nigeria youth national team at the under-17 and under-20 levels.

== Honors and awards ==
Bayelsa Queens

- NWFL Premiership: 2021–22

Lokomotiv Moscow

- Russian Women's Cup: 2024
