= Nigeria Women's Federation Cup =

Nigerian soccer competition

Women's Federation Cup
- Founded: 1991
- Country: Nigeria
- Confederation: CAF
- Current champions: Nasarawa Amazons (3rd title)
- Most championships: Rivers Angels (10 titles)
- Current: 2026 Nigeria Women's Federation Cup

The Nigeria Women's Federation Cup, (formerly Women Challenge Cup and Aiteo Cup) is a cup competition in Nigeria. Rivers Angels of Port Harcourt have won the most titles. The tournament along with Nigeria Women Premier League are the two recognized competition for women football organized by the Nigeria Football Federation. The finals are usually played at Teslim Balogun Stadium in Lagos State.

In June 2017, the Nigeria Football Federation finalized a five-year deal with AITEO Group for the naming rights of the competition. The deal will have the winners and runners-up get ₦10,000,000 and ₦5,000,000 respectively annually. On 28 July 2019, Nasarawa Amazons won their second Aiteo Cup title, defeating Rivers Angels at the final.

== Champions ==
This is a list of champions and runners up since inception.

Year	Champions	Runners-up
1991		
1992	Ufuoma Babes (Warri)	Dynamite
1993	Ufuoma Babes (Warri)	
1994	Ufuoma Babes (Warri)	
1995	Pelican Stars (Calabar)	Ufuoma Babes (Warri)
1996	Ufuoma Babes (Warri)	
1997	Pelican Stars (Calabar)	Ufuoma Babes (Warri)
1998	Pelican Stars (Calabar)	
1999	Pelican Stars (Calabar)	FCT Queens (Abuja)
2000	FCT Queens (Abuja)	
2001	Pelican Stars (Calabar)	Delta Queens (Asaba)
2002	Pelican Stars (Calabar)	Rivers Angels (Port Harcourt)
2003	not played	
2004	Delta Queens (Asaba)	Bayelsa Queens (Yenagoa)
2005	Nasarawa Amazons (Lafia)	Bayelsa Queens (Yenagoa)
2006	Delta Queens (Asaba)	Bayelsa Queens (Yenagoa)
2008	Delta Queens (Asaba)	Rivers Angels (Port Harcourt)
2009	Delta Queens (Asaba)	Bayelsa Queens (Yenagoa)
2010	Rivers Angels (Port Harcourt)	Delta Queens (Asaba)
2011	Rivers Angels (Port Harcourt)	Sunshine Queens (Ondo State)
2012	Rivers Angels (Port Harcourt)	Inneh Queens (Benin City)
2013	Rivers Angels (Port Harcourt)	Nasarawa Amazons (Lafia)
2014	Rivers Angels (Port Harcourt)	Sunshine Queens (Akure)
2015	Sunshine Queens (Akure)	Bayelsa Queens (Bayelsa)
2016	Rivers Angels (Port Harcourt)	Bayelsa Queens
2017	Rivers Angels (Port Harcourt)	Ibom Angels
2018	Rivers Angels (Port Harcourt)	Ibom Angels
2019	Nasarawa Amazons (Lafia)	Rivers Angels (Port-Harcourt)
2020	Not held due to the COVID-19 pandemic	
2021	Bayelsa Queens (Yenagoa)	Robo Queens (Lagos)
2022	Abandoned	
2023	Bayelsa Queens (Yenagoa)	Rivers Angels (Port-Harcourt)
2024	Rivers Angels (Port-Harcourt)	Naija Ratels (Abuja)
2025	Rivers Angels (Port-Harcourt)	Nasarawa Amazons (Lafia)
2026	Nasarawa Amazons (Lafia)	Heartland Queens

== Most successful teams ==
Club	Champions	Runners-up	Winning seasons	Runners-up seasons
Rivers Angels (Port Harcourt)	10	4	2010, 2011, 2012, 2013, 2014, 2016, 2017, 2018, 2024, 2025	2002, 2008, 2019, 2023
Pelican Stars (Calabar)	6	–	1995, 1997, 1998, 1999, 2001, 2002	
Ufuoma Babes (Calabar)	4	2	1992, 1993, 1994, 1996	1995, 1997
Delta Queens (Asaba)	4	1	2004, 2006, 2008, 2009	2001
Nasarawa Amazons (Lafia)	3	2	2005, 2019, 2026	2013, 2025
Bayelsa Queens (Yenagoa)	2	6	2021, 2023	2004, 2005, 2006, 2009, 2015, 2016
FCT Queens (Abuja)	1	1	2000	1999
Sunshine Queens (Akure)	1	2	2015	2011, 2014

== Top scorers ==
Year	Player	Team	Goals
2014	Ebere Orji	Rivers Angels	4 goals
2015	Tina Oyeleme	Sunshine Queens	3 goals
2016			
2017	Amarachi Orjinma	Rivers Angels	8 goals
2018	Mary Anjor	Osun Babes	6 goals

== Best players ==
Year	Player	Team
2014		
2015	Patience Kalu	Bayelsa Queens
2016		
2017	Reuben Charity	Ibom Angels
2024	Blessing Okpe	Rivers Angels
