= Betsy Obaseki Women Football Tournament =

- Founded: 2021
- Current champions: Bayelsa Queens
- Most championships: Bayelsa Queens (first title)

Betsy Obaseki Women Football Tournament (often stylized as BOWFT or shortened Betsy Obaseki Cup) is an annual pre-season tournament for professional and grassroot women's football teams in Nigeria. The tournament was initiated by first lady of Edo State, Betsy Obaseki as a way of promoting women football in the state as well as inviting competition for state-owned, Edo Queens. It is supported by Nigeria Women Football League, as well as federal government of Nigeria. The first, second, third and fourth placed teams gets ₦5 million, ₦3 million, ₦2 million and ₦1 million respectively.

== Past winners ==
Year	Winner	Runner up	Third place
2021	Bayelsa Queens	Rivers Angels	Edo Queens
