= 2025–26 NWFL season =

The 2025–26 NWFL season covers the three tiers of the Nigeria Women Football League, the recognized league system of women's football in Nigeria for the 2025–26 season.

== Premiership ==
The 2025–26 NWFL Premiership was the 36th season of the women's football top-level league in Nigeria. The season commenced on 26 November 2025 and ended with the championship round on 14 June 2026.

2025–26 NWFL season
- Season: 2025–26
- Dates: Regular season: 26 November 2025 – 6 May 2026; Championship round: 5–14 June 2026
- Champions: Edo Queens (2nd title)
- Matches: 177
- Goals: 399 (2.25 per match)
- Biggest home win: Rivers Angels 5–0 Heartland Queens (21 January 2026)
- Biggest away win: Naija Ratels 0–5 Bayelsa Queens (10 December 2025)
- Highest scoring: Dannaz Ladies 5–3 Delta Queens (8 April 2026); Edo Queens 6–2 Abia Angels (10 June 2026)
- Longest winning run: Bayelsa Queens (6 matches)
- All statistics correct as of 14 June 2026.

On 14 June, Edo Queens won their second NWFL Premiership by finishing top of the championship round.

=== Format ===
This season saw an expansion of teams to 20. However, this season only had 19 teams competing as Castmog Ladies were dropped to the NWFL Championship for failing to meet registration requirements. It involved 19 team divided into two groups with the top 3 teams qualifying for a championship round while the lowest 3 teams from each group relegated to the NWFL Championship.

=== Teams ===
==== Team changes ====
As the league was expanded to 20 teams from 16, no team from the previous season was relegated. Castmog Ladies, Ahudiyannem Queens, Imo Strikers Ladies and Sunshine Queens initially got promoted from the NWFL Championship with the first three making their debut. However Imo Strikers Ladies sold their slot to Osun Babes, Benue Queens sold their slot to Pacesetter Queens while Castmog Ladies failed to meet registration requirements meaning Group A contained 9 teams.

Promoted from 2024–2025 NWFL Championship	Relegated from 2024–2025 NWFL Premiership
~~Castmog Ladies~~; Ahudiyannem Queens; Sunshine Queens; Pacesetter Queens; Osun Babes	None

==== Stadiums and locations ====
Group AGroup B
Clubs	Stadium	City
Adamawa Queens	Makwada Stadium	Yola
Bayelsa Queens	Samson Siasia Sports Stadium	Yenagoa
Edo Queens	Samuel Ogbemudia Stadium	Benin City
Ekiti Queens	Oluyemi Kayode Stadium (Note: Played some games at the MKO Abiola Stadium.)	Ado-Ekiti
Heartland Queens	Dan Anyiam Stadium	Owerri
Ibom Angels	Uyo Township Stadium	Uyo
Naija Ratels	Bwari Stadium	Abuja
Pacesetter Ladies	Lekan Salami Stadium	Ibadan
Rivers Angels	Adokiye Amiesimaka Stadium	Port Harcourt
Abia Angels	Umuahia Township Stadium; Enyimba International Stadium	Umuahia
Ahudiyannem Queens	Umuahia Township Stadium; Enyimba International Stadium	Umuahia
Confluence Queens	Edo State University Stadium	Lokoja
Dannaz Ladies	Onikan Stadium	Lagos
Delta Queens	Stephen Keshi Stadium	Asaba
Nasarawa Amazons	Lafia City Stadium	Lafia
Osun Babes	Lanreleke Sports Complex	Osogbo
Remo Stars Ladies	Remo Stars Stadium	Ikenne
Robo Queens	Onikan Stadium	Lagos
Sunshine Queens	Akure Township Stadium	Akure

=== Regular season ===
==== Group A ====
===== Table =====
Pos	Team	Pld	W	D	L	GF	GA	GD	Pts	Qualification
1	Bayelsa Queens	16	12	1	3	35	12	+23	37	Championship round
2	Edo Queens	16	11	3	2	27	11	+16	36	Championship round
3	Rivers Angels	16	11	1	4	29	10	+19	34	Championship round
4	Ekiti Queens	16	7	1	8	17	19	−2	22	
5	Heartland Queens	16	6	4	6	16	19	−3	22	
6	Adamawa Queens	16	6	2	8	15	24	−9	20	
7	Ibom Angels	16	5	4	7	14	18	−4	19	
8	Pacesetter Queens	16	1	5	10	7	20	−13	8	Relegation to NWFL Championship
9	Naija Ratels	16	1	3	12	6	33	−27	6	Relegation to NWFL Championship
10	Castmog Ladies	0	0	0	0	0	0	0	0	Withdrawn

Source: TheNWFL

===== Results =====
Home \ Away	ADA	BAY	EDO	EKI	HEA	IBM	RAT	PAC	RIV
Adamawa Queens		1–4	1–1	2–1	2–1	1–0	2–0	2–0	0–3
Bayelsa Queens	2–0		3–2	2–0	2–0	3–0	5–0	2–0	2–0
Edo Queens	2–0	4–1		2–0	1–0	1–1	2–0	2–1	2–1
Ekiti Queens	1–1	1–0	0–1		2–0	2–0	1–0	2–0	1–2
Heartland Queens	1–0	3–1	0–1	2–1		2–0	2–0	1–1	2–1
Ibom Angels	3–1	1–2	1–2	2–1	0–0		3–1	1–0	1–0
Naija Ratels	0–2	0–5	0–3	1–2	2–2	0–0		1–0	0–2
Pacesetter Queens	2–0	0–1	0–0	0–2	0–0	1–1	1–1		1–2
Rivers Angels	3–0	0–0	2–1	4–0	5–0	1–0	1–0	2–0	

Source: TheNWFL
Legend: Blue = home team win; Yellow = draw; Red = away team win.

==== Group B ====
===== Table =====
Pos	Team	Pld	W	D	L	GF	GA	GD	Pts	Qualification
1	Robo Queens	18	12	2	4	32	13	+19	38	Championship round
2	Nasarawa Amazons	18	9	5	4	22	12	+10	32	Championship round
3	Abia Angels	18	8	4	6	20	13	+7	28	Championship round
4	Ahudiyannem Queens	18	7	4	7	22	17	+5	25	
5	Delta Queens	18	7	4	7	24	24	0	25	
6	Remo Stars Ladies	18	6	6	6	22	15	+7	24	
7	Dannaz Ladies	18	7	2	9	18	31	−13	23	
8	Sunshine Queens	18	5	7	6	13	11	+2	22	Relegation to NWFL Championship
9	Osun Babes	18	5	3	10	9	27	−18	18	Relegation to NWFL Championship
10	Confluence Queens	18	3	5	10	14	33	−19	14	Relegation to NWFL Championship

Source: TheNWFL

===== Results =====
Home \ Away	ABA	AHU	CON	DAN	DEL	NAS	OSU	REM	ROB	SUN
Abia Angels		0–1	1–2	2–0	2–0	2–0	2–0	0–0	0–2	2–0
Ahudiyannem Queens	2–5		5–1	2–0	0–1	0–2	3–0	0–0	1–1	0–0
Confluence Queens	2–2	0–3		0–1	2–1	1–1	0–1	0–2	1–1	0–0
Dannaz Ladies	0–0	2–1	0–3		5–3	0–0	0–1	0–3	1–5	2–1
Delta Queens	0–1	2–1	3–1	2–0		1–1	3–0	3–0	3–2	0–0
Nasarawa Amazons	0–0	0–0	4–0	1–0	2–1		2–0	1–0	4–2	2–1
Osun Babes	0–1	1–0	1–0	2–3	1–1	1–0		0–0	1–0	0–0
Remo Stars Ladies	1–0	1–2	1–1	2–3	4–0	0–1	5–1		1–0	1–1
Robo Queens	2–0	1–0	4–0	2–0	2–0	2–1	w/o (Note: Robo Queens were awarded a 3–0 win over Osun Babes due to the latter side's match administrative issues.)	1–0		1–0
Sunshine Queens	1–0	0–1	2–0	2–0	0–0	1–0	3–0	1–1	0–1	

Source: TheNWFL
Legend: Blue = home team win; Yellow = draw; Red = away team win.

=== Championship round ===
A championship round, known as the Super Six, involving the top three teams from the two groups is held to determine the league champion. It is held at Adokiye Amiesimaka Stadium in Port Harcourt from 5–14 June 2026.

Pos	Team	Pld	W	D	L	GF	GA	GD	Pts	Qualification
1	Edo Queens	5	3	1	1	12	5	+7	10	Champions/CAF WCL
2	Bayelsa Queens	5	2	2	1	6	4	+2	8	
3	Nasarawa Amazons	5	2	2	1	3	3	0	8	
4	Abia Angels	5	1	3	1	5	8	−3	6	
5	Rivers Angels	5	1	1	3	5	7	−2	4	
6	Robo Queens	5	1	1	3	6	10	−4	4	

Source: TheNWFL

Home \ Away	ABA	BAY	EDO	NAS	RIV	ROB
Abia Angels				0–0	1–0	1–1
Bayelsa Queens	1–1		0–0			
Edo Queens	6–2			0–1	2–1	
Nasarawa Amazons		2–1			0–0	
Rivers Angels		1–2				3–2
Robo Queens		0–2	1–4	2–0		

Source: TheNWFL
Legend: Blue = home team win; Yellow = draw; Red = away team win.

=== Top scorers ===
As of 14 June 2026

Rank	Player	Club	Goals
1	(Nigeria) Uwah Abasiofon	Rivers Angels	13
1	(Nigeria) Doosuur Atume	Edo Queens	13
3	(Nigeria) Chioma Moses	Edo Queens	11
3	(Nigeria) Oluwakemi Adegbuyi	Robo Queens	11
5	(Nigeria) Opeyemi Ajakaye	Robo Queens	7
5	(Nigeria) Ayatsea Hembafan	Nasarawa Amazons	7
5	(Nigeria) Kindness Ifeanyi	Bayelsa Queens	7
5	(Nigeria) Winner David	Abia Angels	7
9	(Nigeria) Grace Saliu	Rivers Angels	6
9	(Nigeria) Ramotallahi Kareem	Rivers Angels	6
9	(Nigeria) Ifeanyi Damian	Adamawa Queens	6
9	(Nigeria) Tosin Rafiu	Robo Queens	6

== Championship ==
The 2026 NWFL Championship was the second level women's football league in Nigeria for the year 2026. It was held at the U.J. Esuene Stadium and St Patrick's Stadium in Calabar between 9 to 16 July 2026.

2026 NWFL Championship
- Season: 2026
- Dates: 9–16 July 2026
- Promoted: Pelican Stars; Imo Strikers Queens
- Relegated: First Mahi Babes; Chosen Generation
- Matches: 28
- Goals: 64 (2.29 per match)
- Longest winning run: Pelican Stars (4 matches)
- All statistics correct as of 16 July 2026.

At the end of the tournament, Imo Strikers Queens and Pelican Stars gained promotion to the NWFL Premiership while First Mahi Babes and Chosen Generation were relegated to the NWFL Nationwide League.

=== Teams ===
16 teams were involved this season.

Group AGroup BGroup CGroup D
Clubs	City/State
Delta Babes	Delta State
DreamStar Ladies	Lagos
First Mahi Babes	Abakaliki
Rosaria Victrix	Ngugo, Ikeduru
Gallant Queens	Kaduna
Ikukuoma Babes	Imo State
Moje Queens	Erin-Ile, Kwara State
Pelican Stars	Calabar
Enugu Rangers Women	Enugu
Fortress Ladies	Benin City
Unification Ladies	Agege, Lagos
Wazbak International	Lagos
Chosen Generation	Wasimi, Ogun State
Ghetto Tigers Ladies	Odi-Olowo, Lagos
Imo Strikers Queens	Owerri
Kwara Ladies	Kwara State

=== Group stage ===
==== Group A ====
===== Table =====
Pos	Team	Pld	W	D	L	GF	GA	GD	Pts	Qualification or relegation
1	DreamStar Ladies	3	2	1	0	5	2	+3	7	Promotion Play-offs
2	Rosaria Victrix	3	2	0	1	6	4	+2	6	
3	Delta Babes	3	1	1	1	2	3	−1	4	
4	First Mahi Babes	3	0	0	3	3	7	−4	0	Relegation play-offs

Source: TheNWFL
Rules for classification: 1) Points; 2) Goal difference; 3) Goals scored.

===== Results =====
Home \ Away	DEL	DRE	FMB	ROS
Delta Babes		0–0	2–1	
DreamStar Ladies				3–1
First Mahi Babes		1–2		
Rosaria Victrix	2–0		3–1	

Source: TheNWFL
Legend: Blue = home team win; Yellow = draw; Red = away team win.

==== Group B ====
===== Table =====
Pos	Team	Pld	W	D	L	GF	GA	GD	Pts	Qualification or relegation
1	Pelican Stars	3	3	0	0	5	1	+4	9	Promotion Play-offs
2	Moje Queens	3	1	1	1	2	2	0	4	
3	Ikukuoma Babes	3	1	0	2	4	4	0	3	
4	Gallant Queens	3	0	1	2	2	6	−4	1	Relegation play-offs

Source: TheNWFL
Rules for classification: 1) Points; 2) Goal difference; 3) Goals scored.

===== Results =====
Home \ Away	GAL	IKU	MOJ	PEL
Gallant Queens		1–3		0–2
Ikukuoma Babes			0–1	
Moje Queens	1–1			
Pelican Stars		2–1	1–0	

Source: TheNWFL
Legend: Blue = home team win; Yellow = draw; Red = away team win.

==== Group C ====
===== Table =====
Pos	Team	Pld	W	D	L	GF	GA	GD	Pts	Qualification or relegation
1	Enugu Rangers Women	3	2	1	0	3	1	+2	7	Promotion Play-offs
2	Unification Ladies	3	1	2	0	5	1	+4	5	
3	Wazbak International	3	1	0	2	5	9	−4	3	
4	Fortress Ladies	3	0	1	2	2	4	−2	1	Relegation play-offs

Source: TheNWFL
Rules for classification: 1) Points; 2) Goal difference; 3) Goals scored.

===== Results =====
Home \ Away	ENU	FOR	UNI	WAZ
Enugu Rangers Women		1–0	0–0	
Fortress Ladies				2–3
Unification Ladies		0–0		
Wazbak International	1–2		1–5	

Source: TheNWFL
Legend: Blue = home team win; Yellow = draw; Red = away team win.

==== Group D ====
===== Table =====
Pos	Team	Pld	W	D	L	GF	GA	GD	Pts	Qualification or relegation
1	Imo Strikers Queens	3	3	0	0	10	0	+10	9	Promotion Play-offs
2	Ghetto Tigers Ladies	3	2	0	1	3	4	−1	6	
3	Kwara Ladies	3	0	1	2	0	4	−4	1	
4	Chosen Generation	3	0	1	2	0	5	−5	1	Relegation play-offs

Source: TheNWFL
Rules for classification: 1) Points; 2) Goal difference; 3) Goals scored.

===== Results =====
Home \ Away	CHO	GHE	IMO	KWA
Chosen Generation		0–2		0–0
Ghetto Tigers Ladies			0–4	1–0
Imo Strikers Queens	3–0			
Kwara Ladies			0–3	

Source: TheNWFL
Legend: Blue = home team win; Yellow = draw; Red = away team win.

=== Playoffs ===
==== Relegation play-offs ====
16 July 2026
09:00 (UTC+1)

First Mahi Babes	0–1	Gallant Queens
		Hope Jeremiah 29'

U.J. Esuene Stadium, Calabar
16 July 2026
11:30 (UTC+1)

Fortress Ladies	4–1	Chosen Generation
Favour Enodunwenben 5', 65', 71'; Omosefe Ugbo 57'		Mary Adekunle 78'

U.J. Esuene Stadium, Calabar

First Mahi Babes and Chosen Generation were relegated.

==== Promotion play-offs ====
16 July 2026
14:00 (UTC+1)

Enugu Rangers Women	0–0	Imo Strikers Queens
Penalties
	4–5

U.J. Esuene Stadium, Calabar
16 July 2026
16:00 (UTC+1)

DreamStar Ladies	0–1	Pelican Stars
	Report	Blessing Ayila 90+10'

U.J. Esuene Stadium, Calabar

Imo Strikers Queens and Pelican Stars gained promotion to the NWFL Premiership.

== Nationwide League ==
The 2026 NWFL Nationwide League was the third level women's football league in Nigeria for the year 2026. It was held at the Enyimba International Stadium in Aba between 15 to 23 August 2026.

2026 NWFL Nationwide League
- Season: 2026
- Dates: 15–23 August 2026
- Champions: C2E Sports Academy
- Promoted: C2E Sports Academy; Obosa FA
- Matches: 15
- Goals: 63 (4.2 per match)
- Longest winning run: C2E Sports Academy (4 matches)
- All statistics correct as of 23 August 2026.

=== Teams ===
12 teams participated.

Group AGroup BGroup CGroup D
Clubs	City/State
Kwara United Queens	Ilorin
Solo Wonders Babes	Akwa Ibom State
Spunky Blazers FA	Edo State
Bayelsa Princesses	Yenagoa
C2E Sports Academy	Aba
Lakeside Queens	Ikenne
NAF Queens	Abuja
Onimarg FC	Akure
Ubakala Babes	Umuahia
Obosa FA	Lagos
Osklean FA	Port Harcourt
Plateau United Queens	Kwara State

=== Group stage ===
==== Group A ====
===== Table =====
Pos	Team	Pld	W	D	L	GF	GA	GD	Pts	Qualification or relegation
1	Kwara United Queens	2	1	1	0	1	0	+1	4	Promotion play-offs
2	Solo Wonders Babes	2	1	0	1	2	2	0	3	
3	Spunky Blazers FA	2	0	1	1	1	2	−1	1	

Source: TheNWFL
Rules for classification: 1) Points; 2) Goal difference; 3) Goals scored.

===== Results =====
Home \ Away	KWA	SOL	SPU
Kwara United Queens		1–0	
Solo Wonders Babes			2–1
Spunky Blazers FA	0–0		

Source: TheNWFL
Legend: Blue = home team win; Yellow = draw; Red = away team win.

==== Group B ====
===== Table =====
Pos	Team	Pld	W	D	L	GF	GA	GD	Pts	Qualification or relegation
1	C2E Sports Academy	2	2	0	0	15	1	+14	6	Promotion play-offs
2	Lakeside Queens	2	1	0	1	3	5	−2	3	
3	Bayelsa Princesses	2	0	0	2	1	13	−12	0	

Source: TheNWFL
Rules for classification: 1) Points; 2) Goal difference; 3) Goals scored.

===== Results =====
Home \ Away	BAY	C2E	LAK
Bayelsa Princesses			0–3
C2E Sports Academy	10–1		
Lakeside Queens		0–5	

Source: TheNWFL
Legend: Blue = home team win; Yellow = draw; Red = away team win.

==== Group C ====
===== Table =====
Pos	Team	Pld	W	D	L	GF	GA	GD	Pts	Qualification or relegation
1	Onimarg FC	2	2	0	0	7	3	+4	6	Promotion play-offs
2	Ubakala Babes	2	1	0	1	8	5	+3	3	
3	NAF Queens	2	0	0	2	2	9	−7	0	

Source: TheNWFL
Rules for classification: 1) Points; 2) Goal difference; 3) Goals scored.

===== Results =====
Home \ Away	NAF	ONI	UBA
NAF Queens			1–6
Onimarg FC	3–1		
Ubakala Babes		2–4	

Source: TheNWFL
Legend: Blue = home team win; Yellow = draw; Red = away team win.

==== Group D ====
===== Table =====
Pos	Team	Pld	W	D	L	GF	GA	GD	Pts	Qualification or relegation
1	Obosa FA	2	1	1	0	3	2	+1	4	Promotion play-offs
2	Osklean FA	2	1	1	0	2	1	+1	4	
3	Plateau United Queens	2	0	0	2	3	5	−2	0	

Source: TheNWFL
Rules for classification: 1) Points; 2) Goal difference; 3) Goals scored.

===== Results =====
Home \ Away	OBA	OSK	PLA
Obosa FA		0–0	
Osklean FA			2–1
Plateau United Queens	2–3		

Source: TheNWFL
Legend: Blue = home team win; Yellow = draw; Red = away team win.

=== Promotion play-offs ===
==== Semi-final ====
21 August 2026
09:00 (UTC+1)

Kwara United Queens	2–4	C2E Sports Academy
Oluwabunkunmi Azeez 3'; Amarachi Nnorom 47'	Report	Omobolanle Abdulganiu 45' (o.g.); Chidinma Gideon 52'; Taiwo Omoniyi 74' (o.g.); Agnes Ohuche 87'

Enyimba International Stadium, Aba
21 August 2026
11:00 (UTC+1)

Onimarg FC	2–4	Obosa FA
Victoria Yakubu 10'; Adeomo Lovelyn 33'	Report	Chinemerem Nnachi 13'; Idowu Saidat 45+2', 55'; Aliu Rofia 90+2'

Enyimba International Stadium, Aba

C2E Sports Academy and Obosa FA gained promotion to the NWFL Championship.

==== Final ====
23 August 2026
14:00 (UTC+1)

C2E Sports Academy	2–1	Obosa FA
Agnes Ohuche 11'; Nina Ude 30'	Report	Saidat Idowu 47'

Enyimba International Stadium, Aba

C2E were the winners of the NWFL Nationwide League.

== See also ==
- 2026 Nigeria Federation Cup
- 2026 Nigeria Women's Federation Cup
- 2025–26 Nigeria Premier Football League
- 2025–26 Nigeria National League
