= Cecilia Nku =

Nigerian footballer

Personal information
- Full name: Cecilia Ngibo Nku
- Date of birth: 26 October 1992 (age 34)
- Place of birth: Nigeria
- Height: 1.53 m (5 ft 0 in)
- Position: Midfielder

Team information
- Current team: Rivers Angels
- Number: 20

Senior career*
Years	Team	Apps	(Gls)
????-2015	Rivers Angels		
2016	Medkila IL	18	(1)
2017-2018	Ferencvárosi TC		
2019	Rivers Angels		

International career^{‡}
2010–2019	Nigeria	9	(1)
- * Club domestic league appearances and goals ‡ National team caps and goals as of 18:36, 17 June 2015 (UTC)

Cecilia Ngibo Nku (born 26 October 1992) is a Nigerian footballer who plays as a midfielder for Rivers Angels of the Nigerian Women's Championship.

== International career ==
Nku had her first international action in 2010 while playing for Nigeria in the 2010 FIFA U-20 Women's World Cup. She was part of the senior Nigerian squad which won the 2014 African Women's Championship in Namibia. In May 2015 Nku was called up to play for team Nigeria in the 2015 FIFA Women's World Cup.

== Honours ==
=== International ===
Nigeria

- African Women's Championship (1): 2014
