= Ibubeleye Whyte =

Nigerian footballer

Personal information
- Full name: Ibubeleye Whyte
- Date of birth: 9 January 1992 (age 34)
- Place of birth: Enugu, Enugu State, Nigeria
- Height: 1.71 m (5 ft 7 in)
- Position: Goalkeeper

Team information
- Current team: Rivers Angels
- Number: 1

Senior career*
Years	Team	Apps	(Gls)
- Rivers Angels

International career^{‡}
2013–2015	Nigeria	6	(0)
- * Club domestic league appearances and goals ‡ National team caps and goals as of 18:25, 17 June 2015 (UTC)

Ibubeleye Whyte (born 9 January 1992 in Enugu, Nigeria) is a Nigeria footballer who plays as a goalkeeper for Rivers Angels in the Nigerian Women's Championship and the Nigeria women's national football team.

== International career ==
Whyte made her international debut in the 2012 FIFA U-20 Women's World Cup in a 2–1 loss to Japan U-20. She was also part of the senior squads at the African Women's Championship of 2012 and the winning team of 2014. In May 2015 she was called up to be part of the team Nigeria in the 2015 FIFA Women's World Cup.

== Honours ==
=== International ===
Nigeria

- African Women's Championship (2): 2014, 2016
