= Rita Akarekor =

Nigerian footballer

Personal information
- Date of birth: 13 February 2001 (age 25)
- Height: 1.72 m (5 ft 8 in)
- Position: Goalkeeper

Team information
- Current team: Delta Queens

International career
Years	Team	Apps	(Gls)
- Nigeria

Rita Akarekor (born 13 February 2001) is a Nigerian footballer who plays for Delta Queens in the Nigeria Women Premier League, and Nigeria women's national football team as a goalkeeper. She was adjudged the best goalkeeper in the 2016 Nigeria Women Premier League, and was the only player in her position nominated as the most valuable player in the league.

== Playing career ==
=== Club ===
During the 2017 Nigeria Women Premier League, Akarekor scored a goal in her side's two–goal win over Adamawa Queens. She explained that it has been her desire for a while to score a competitive goal in the league. In April 2017, Akarekor was in the lineup that defeated relegation threatened Saadatu Amazons, 2-1. A goal from Amazons ended her clean sheet from two previous games. In July 2017, the penultimate game before the end of the regular season, Akarekor recorded another clean sheet against Adamawa Queens at the Atiku Abubakar Stadium.

=== International career ===
Akarekor featured in the 2016 Africa Women Cup of Nations winning team.

2016 AFCON Tournament: Participated in the main 2016 tournament in Cameroon as one of the youngest squad members—born in 2001, she was just 15 at the time.

Falconets (U‑20)

2018 U‑20 World Cup: Rita Akarekor was selected as a goalkeeper for the Falconets in the 2018 FIFA U‑20 Women’s World Cup held in France—alongside notable U‑17 and club keepers.
