= Nigeria Women's Super Cup =

- Founded: 2018
- Region: Nigeria
- Teams: 2

The Nigeria Women's Super Cup, otherwise known as NWFL Champions Shield is an annual game, featuring the teams that won the Aiteo Cup and the Nigeria Women Premier League in the previous season. The first edition was contested on March 4, 2018 between Nasarawa Amazons and Rivers Angels at Agege Stadium, Lagos. The game also signals the curtain opener for the new football season.

== Past winners ==
- 2018: Rivers Angels
- 2019: Bayelsa Queens
