= Josephine Mathias =

Nigerian footballer

Personal information
- Full name: Josephine Mathias
- Date of birth: 16 December 1999 (age 26)
- Place of birth: Kaduna, Nigeria
- Height: 1.63 m (5 ft 4 in)
- Position: Midfielder

Team information
- Current team: Bnot Netanya F.C

Senior career*
Years	Team	Apps	(Gls)
- Nasarawa Amazons
2018	Trabzon İdmanocağı	6	(0)
- Rivers Angels
- Nasarawa Amazons

International career
- Nigeria
- * Club domestic league appearances and goals

Josephine Mathias (born 16 December 1999) is a Nigerian women's football midfielder, who played in the Israeli Women's Football League for Bnot Netanya F.C. with jersey number 18.

Mathias played in her country for Nasarawa Amazons. By March 2018, she moved to Turkey and joined Trabzon İdmanocağı to play in the 2017-18 Turkish Women's First Football League. She capped six times in total, and left the team after they were relegated to the Women's Second League. Returned to Nigeria, she signed first with Rivers Angels, and transferred then to her former club to Nasarawa Amazons In 2025 she moved to Israeli .

She was a member of the Nigeria women's national football team at the 2020 CAF Women's Olympic Qualifying Tournament matches between August and October 2019.
