= Gift Monday =

Nigerian footballer (born 2001)

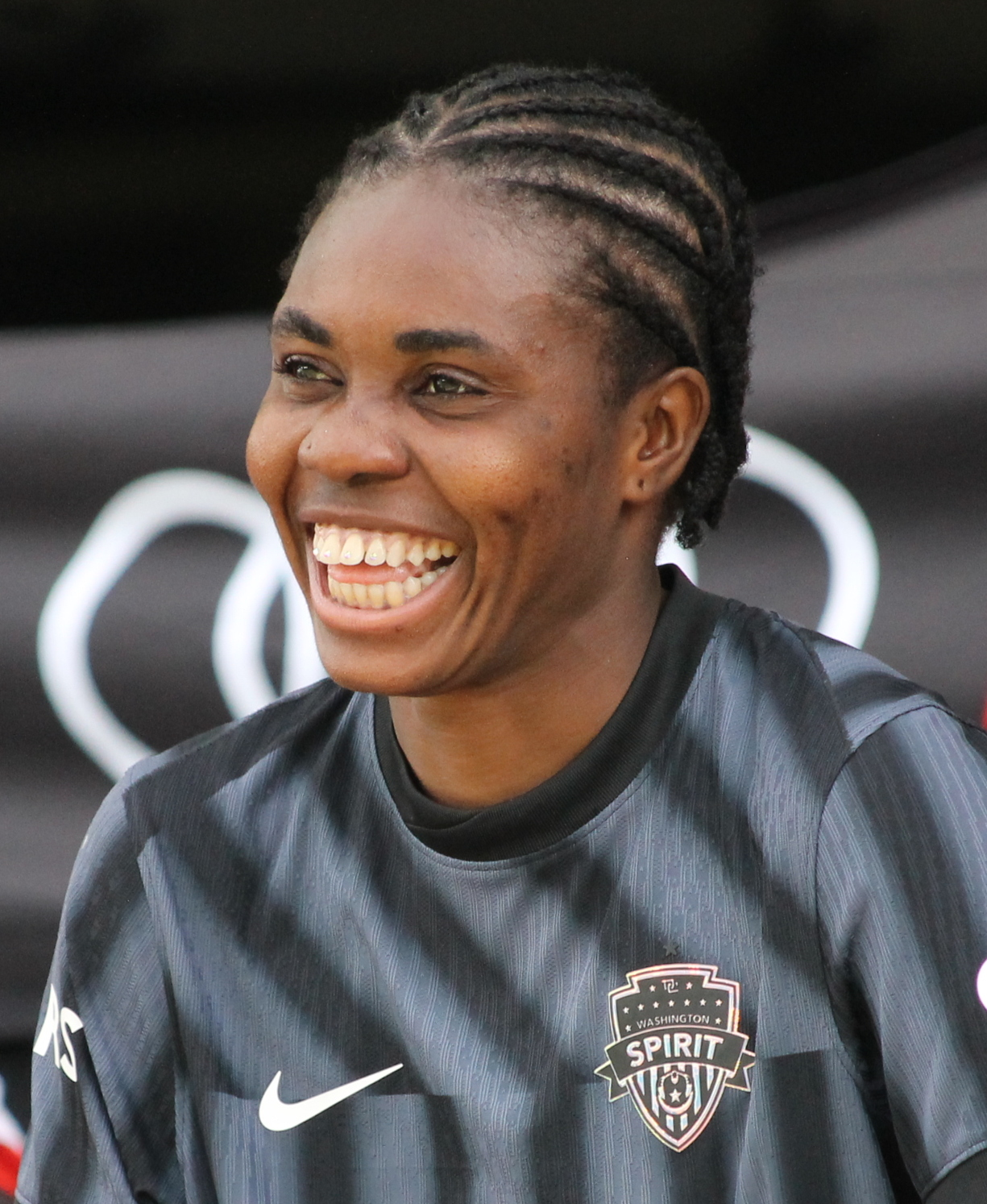
- Monday with the Washington Spirit in 2025

Personal information
- Full name: Gift Nyakno Monday
- Date of birth: 9 December 2001 (age 24)
- Place of birth: Akwa Ibom, Nigeria
- Height: 1.68 m (5 ft 6 in)
- Position: Striker

Team information
- Current team: Boston Legacy
- Number: 22

Senior career*
Years	Team	Apps	(Gls)
2016–2018	COD United Amazons	25	(18)
2018–2021	FC Robo		(13)
2021–2022	Bayelsa Queens		
2022–2025	UD Tenerife	66	(19)
2025–2026	Washington Spirit	40	(9)
2026–	Boston Legacy	2	(0)

International career^{‡}
2018–2020	Nigeria U20	3	(0)
2019–	Nigeria	22	(7)
- * Club domestic league appearances and goals as of 02:15, 8 November 2026 (UTC) ‡ National team caps and goals as of 18 August 2026

Gift Nyakno Monday (born 9 December 2001) is a Nigerian professional footballer who plays as a striker for Boston Legacy FC of the National Women's Soccer League (NWSL) and the Nigeria national team.

== Club career ==
In the early years of her club career, Monday played for three different clubs in the Nigerian Women's Football League (NWFL). In January 2021, Monday was named the league's Player of the Month for the second consecutive month. In March 2021, Monday scored a brace to lift FC Robo to a 2–1 win over the undefeated Rivers Angels. Monday inspired Bayelsa Queens to winning the 2021–22 league title and also finished as the season's top scorer.

In September 2022, Monday joined Spanish Liga F club UD Tenerife.

On 25 March 2025, NWSL club Washington Spirit acquired Monday from Tenerife in exchange for an undisclosed fee and signed her to a three-year contract with an additional team option for 2028. She made her club debut on 12 April 2025, coming on as a substitute for Gabrielle Carle in a 2–0 win over Racing Louisville FC. One week later, Monday recorded her first NWSL start and goal, scoring after stealing the ball from goalkeeper Anna Moorhouse at the goal line in a 1–0 victory over league leaders Orlando Pride. On 28 September, Monday registered the fastest NWSL hat-trick from kickoff in league history, netting three goals in under 36 minutes to help Washington beat the Houston Dash.

In October 2026, the Spirit traded Monday to Boston Legacy FC in exchange for US$500,000 in transfer threshold funds and a 20% sell-on clause.

== International career ==
Monday competed at the 2018 FIFA U-20 Women's World Cup in France. In 2019, she captained the national team to its first gold medal in 12 years at the African Games after defeating Cameroon 3–1 on penalties. In February 2021, Monday was named to the senior national team squad ahead of the 2021 Turkish Women's Cup. She was part of the team that won the championship and was the first African team to do so. She scored the eighth goal in the team's 9–0 win over Equatorial Guinea.

On 16 June 2023, she was included in the 23-player Nigerian squad for the FIFA Women's World Cup 2023.

Monday was called up to the Nigeria squad for the 2024 Summer Olympics as an unrolled alternate player.

== International goals ==
No.	Date	Venue	Opponent	Score	Result	Competition
1.	23 February 2021	Arslan Zeki Demirci Sports Complex, Ilıca, Turkey	Equatorial Guinea	8–0	9–0	2021 Turkish Women's Cup
2.	15 September 2021	Onikan Stadium, Lagos, Nigeria	Mali	1–0	2–0	Aisha Buhari Cup
3.	15 September 2021	Onikan Stadium, Lagos, Nigeria	Mali	2−0	2–0	Aisha Buhari Cup
4.	30 November 2023	Onikan Stadium, Lagos, Nigeria	Cape Verde	2–0	5–0	2024 Women's Africa Cup of Nations qualification
5.	29 October 2024	Remo Stars Stadium, Lagos, Nigeria	Algeria	3–1	4–1	Friendly
6.	5 August 2026	Rabat Olympic Stadium, Rabat, Morocco	Egypt	2–0	6–2	2026 Women's Africa Cup of Nations

== Honors ==
Individual

- NWFL Premiership Player of the Month: December 2020, January 2021
- NWFL Premiership Player of the Season: 2022
- Liga F Player of the Month: February 2025

International

- Turkish Women's Cup: 2021
