= Peter Dedevbo =

Personal information
- Full name: Peter Owhofasa Dedevbo
- Date of birth: 22 July 1970 (age 56)
- Place of birth: Sapele, Delta State
- Height: 6 ft 2 in (1.88 m)
- Position: Central midfielder

Team information
- Current team: Nigeria Women's U-20 (Head Coach)

Senior career*
Years	Team	Apps	(Gls)
1983–1985	Nepa FC	16	(2)
1985–1987	NNPC FC	16	(2)
1988–1990	Rubber Board FC	35	(1)
Total		94	(13)

International career
2009–2012	National U- 17 Women Abuja		
2013–	National U- 20 Women Abuja		

Managerial career
- 1994–2000: Pedro Stars F.C
- 2002: Bayelsa Queens FC
- 2003–: Delta Queens F.C.
- * Club domestic league appearances and goals

Peter Dedevbo is a soccer coach who is currently the head coach of Delta Queens F.C. and a former head coach of the Nigerian U20- Women's National team. In 2014, he led the Nigerian women U20 squad to final of the U20 World Cup in Canada.

== Managerial career ==
=== U20 national team ===
In 2013, The Nigerian Football Federation named Dedevbo as the head coach of the Nigerian U20 Women's National team. He was reappointed head coach in 2015 after his team reached the U20 women's world cup.

=== Delta Queens F.C. ===
In 2024 he was appointed the head coach of the club.

== Personal life ==
Dedevbo is married with three children to Rume Jibromah Dedevbo. In 2014, he was named the Nigerian Coach of the year at the Nigerian Sports Awards.
