= Oshogbo Stadium =

Stadium in Osun State, Nigeria

Coordinates: 7°47′38″N 4°34′20″E

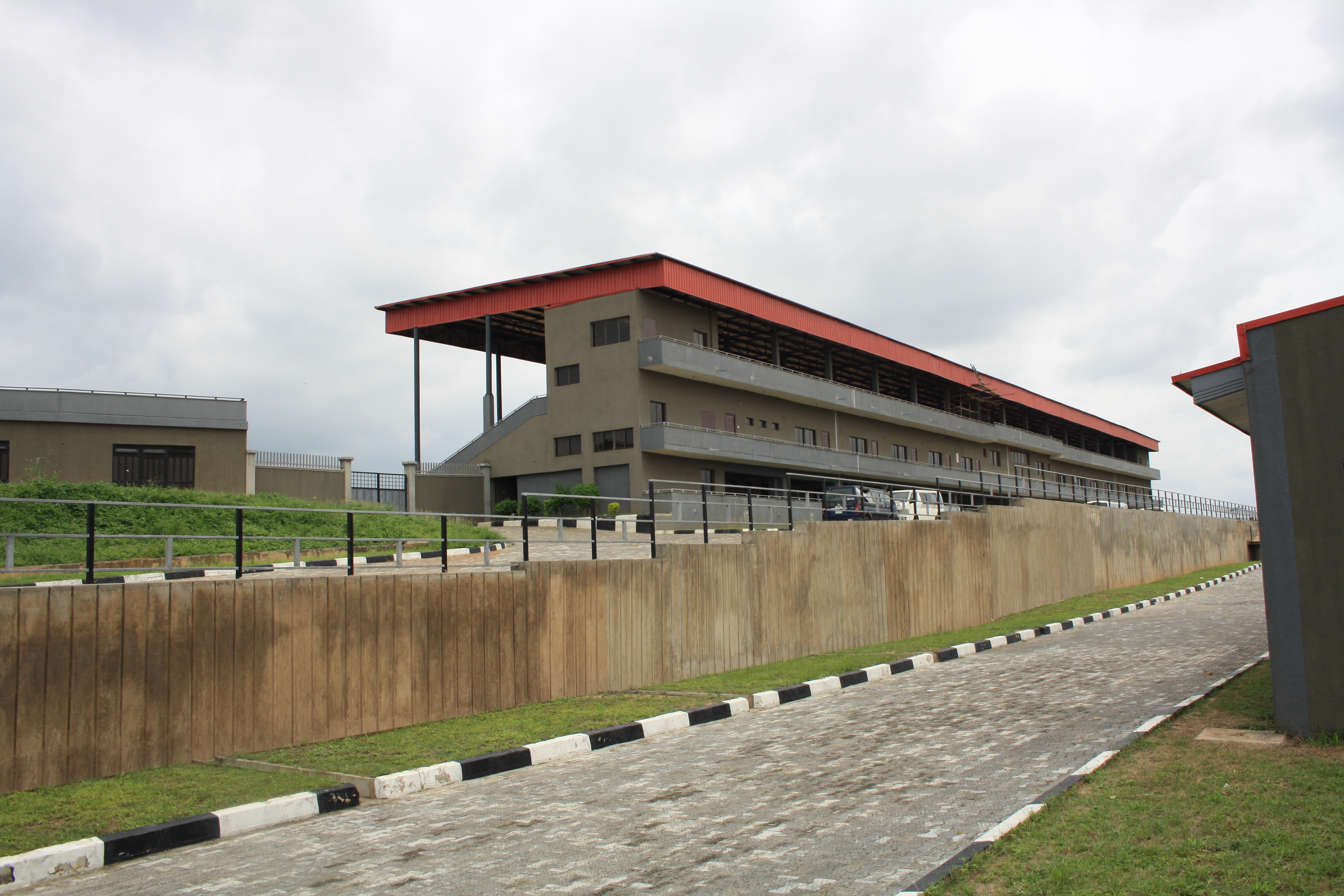
Oshogbo Stadium

Osogbo Township Stadium is a multi-use stadium in Osogbo, Osun State, Nigeria. It is currently used mostly for football matches and is the home stadium of Prime F.C. and Orangun FC. The stadium has a capacity of 4,000 people. It currently undergoing renovation to increase it capacity to 15,000 people.

== History ==
The Nigerian Women Football League (NWFL) banned the Oshogbo Stadium from hosting any of its league matches on December 6, 2021. The stadium was approved for renovation by the Government January 2022.

In February 2024, the stadium was shut down to repair the turf in preparation for the second half of the NNL. It was reopened March 2024.

== Uses ==
The stadium is used for all sporting activities.
