= Naija Ratels F.C. =

Naija Ratels Football Club
- Founded: 2019
- Ground: Aguiyi Ironsi Pitch FIFA Goal Project Pitch
- Owner: Paul Edeh
- Chairman: Eneh Alison
- Manager: Bankole Olowookore
- League: NWFL Premiership
- 2025–26: Regular season: 9th, Group A (Relegated)

Naija Ratels Football Club is a Nigerian women's football club based in Abuja and a member of the NWFL Premiership since 2021 after gaining promotion from the NWFL Championship.

== History ==
The club was founded in 2019 by Paul Edeh, a barrister who equally owns Ratels Foundations and a second team, Honey Badgers. They participated in the 2020–21 NWFL Championship after acquiring the Invincible Angels slot and originally played from Gboko, Benue State. In 2021, they won promotion to the NWFL Premiership and quickly made new signings, including the legendary Onome Ebi after a season in the top-flight.

Naija Ratels reached their first major final in the 2024 Nigeria Women's Cup, losing 1–0 to Rivers Angels.

== Players ==
Note: Flags indicate national team as defined under FIFA eligibility rules; some limited exceptions apply. Players may hold more than one non-FIFA nationality.

No.	Pos.	Nation	Player
—	GK	NGA	Ohia Doris
—	DF	NGA	Animashuan Aishat
—	DF	NGA	Oluwabunmi Oladeji
—	DF	NGA	Ali Paulina (Captain)
—	DF	NGA	Aminat Folorunsho
—	MF	NGA	Ezekiel Motunrayo
—	MF	NGA	Emmanuel Blessing
—	MF	NGA	Agama Ziperekefeghe
—	MF	NGA	Dzer Josephine
—	FW	NGA	Ojo Fehinti
—	FW	NGA	Bankole Sofiat

No.	Pos.	Nation	Player
—	GK	NGA	Omilana Faith
—	DF	NGA	Boigyande Loveth
—	DF	NGA	Daniel Precious
—	MF	NGA	Adeshina Timininu
—	MF	NGA	Alua Chioma
—	MF	NGA	Adugbe Olamide
—	FW	NGA	Orshio Paulina
—	FW	NGA	Olamide Oyinlola
—	FW	NGA	Bello Aminat

== Former players ==
- Onome Ebi
