= Ibom Angels F.C. =

Ibom Angels Football Club
- Nickname: Orange Girls
- Founded: 2004
- Ground: Uyo Township Stadium
- Capacity: 5,000
- Owner: Government of Akwa-Ibom State
- Chairman: Prince Ukeme Ukpong
- Manager: Edwin Okon
- League: NWFL Premiership
- 2025–26: Regular season: 7th, Group A

Ibom Angels Football Club is a Nigerian women's football club that plays in Uyo, Akwa Ibom State. They currently play in the NWFL Premiership.

== History ==
Ibom Angels Football Club is owned by the Akwa-Ibom State Government and was created in the year 2004 in its present state. It had been known as Ibom Babes and Ibom Unity Queens before 2004. In the 2009 season, they got promoted to the top-flight, remaining there till their relegation in 2021. However, they regained promotion the following season after finishing top of their group in the second division, only to relegate again that same season.

They have reached the Aiteo Cup final twice, losing both consecutive finals to Rivers Angels in 2017 and 2018.

They currently play at the Uyo Township Stadium in Uyo.

== Players ==
As of the 2025–26 season.

Note: Flags indicate national team as defined under FIFA eligibility rules; some limited exceptions apply. Players may hold more than one non-FIFA nationality.

No.	Pos.	Nation	Player
22	GK	NGA	Odinaka Nweke
34	GK	NGA	Arek Godstime
2	DF	NGA	Mmesoma Uchendu
3	DF	NGA	Helen Daniel
5	DF	NGA	Godsgift Afigbediator
6	DF	NGA	Angela Okechi
20	DF	NGA	Omolola Ibudun
24	DF	NGA	Chikwai Ifunanya
30	DF	NGA	Ndiana Abasi Jumbo
8	MF	NGA	Victory Onuma (Captain)

No.	Pos.	Nation	Player
10	MF	NGA	Mercy Agada
14	MF	NGA	Paul Ben Ayebapreye
18	MF	NGA	Mbetobong Johnson
25	MF	NGA	Jessica Mark
31	MF	NGA	Happiness Agboye
7	FW	NGA	Mercy Otuu
15	FW	NGA	Eunice Ezeani
16	FW	NGA	Juliet John
17	FW	NGA	Mirian Okocha
27	FW	NGA	Aminat Ajide

=== Former players ===
- Precious Dede
- Glory Ogbonna
- Charity Reuben

== Honours ==
League

- Second Division/NWFL Championship
  - Champions: 2023/24

Cup

- Nigeria Women's Federation Cup
  - Runners-up: 2017, 2018
