= Samuel Ogbemudia Stadium =

Multi-use stadium in Nigeria

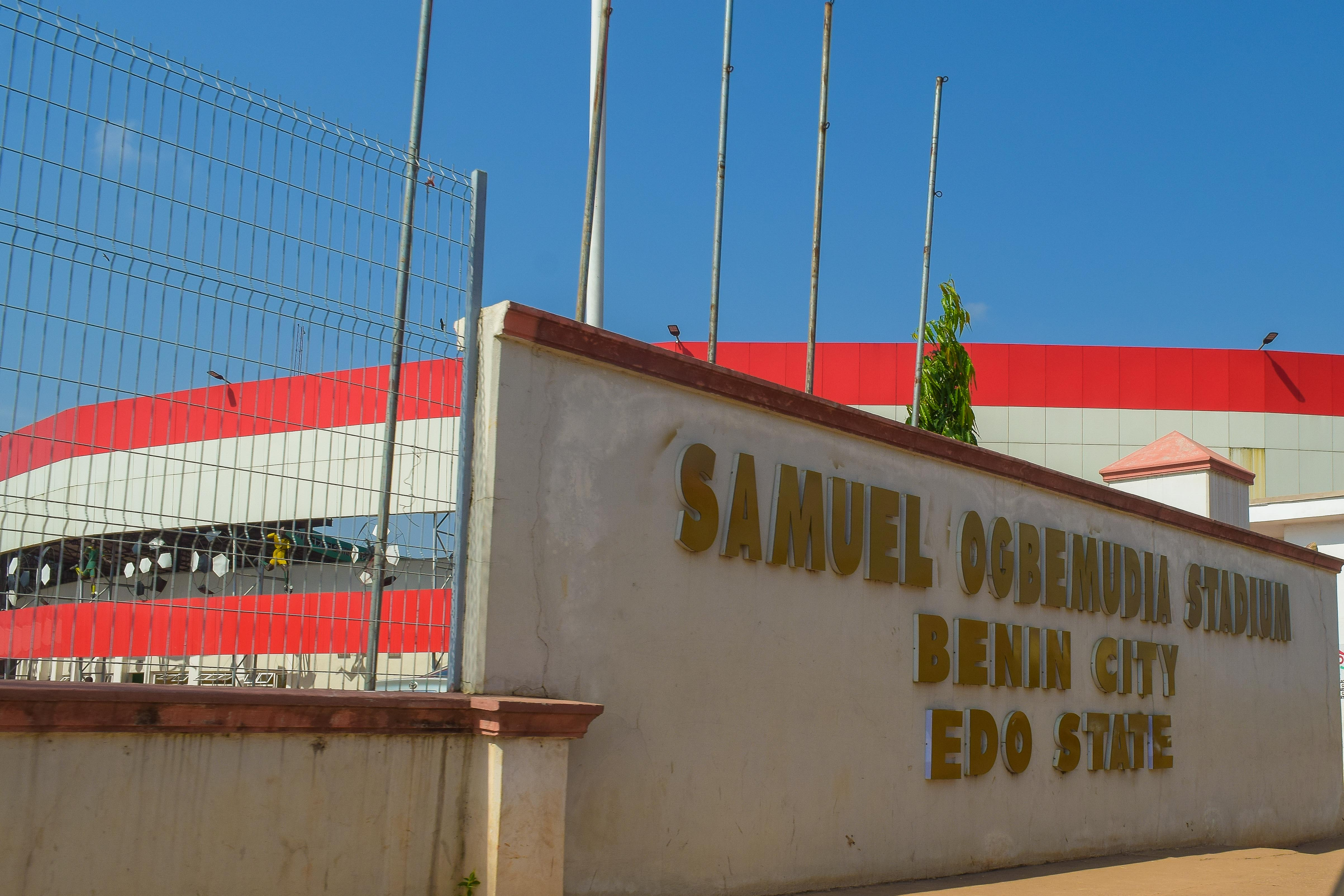
- Samuel Ogbemudia Stadium, Benin City Edo State
- Interactive map of Samuel Ogbemudia Stadium
- Location: Benin City
- Coordinates: 6°19′56″N 5°36′40″E
- Capacity: 19,500

Construction
- Opened: 1985

Tenants
- Bendel Insurance FC and Edo Queens FC

The Samuel Ogbemudia Stadium is a multi-use stadium in Benin City, Nigeria. Originally known as Ogbe Stadium, it is currently used mostly for football matches and is the home stadium of Bendel Insurance FC and Edo Queens FC.

The stadium has a sitting capacity of 19,500 after extensive renovation by the Governor Godwin Obaseki-led administration in 2018.

It is named after the two-time Governor of the old Bendel State, Dr. Samuel Ogbemudia. In February 2009, the stadium was banned by the National League for having an unsafe, below-standard playing surface.

Since Adams Oshiomhole assumed office as governor in 2008, there have been significant changes in the stadium, like new FIFA approved turf playing pitch and so many others. In 2018, the Obaseki-led administration, in line with its Making Edo Great Again (MEGA) agenda, embarked on a total overhaul and reconstruction of the stadium's facilities. All the seats in the previous 20,000-capacity stadium were replaced with modern ones, the synthetic grass in the pitch was replaced with natural grass and the tartan tracks replaced. In the course of the reconstruction, drains were constructed to deal with the flooding challenge in the stadium.

Since the completion of renovations, Samuel Ogbemudia Stadium has hosted national tournaments and competitions such as the 2020 National Sports Festival, the Betsy Obaseki Women Football Tournament and the Athletics Federation of Nigeria (AFN) trails for Commonwealth Games

On the back of Obaseki's reenactment of sports in the state, the home team of the Samuel Ogbemudia Stadium, Bendel Insurance, recently regained promotion to the Nigeria Premier Football League.

== History ==
The stadium was named after Dr. Samuel Ogbemudia, the two-time Governor of the old Bendel State, who served from 1967 to 1975 and again from 1983 to 1984. During his tenure, Ogbemudia invested heavily in sports development in the state, leading to the construction of the stadium.

== Renovation ==
Samuel Ogbemudia Stadium was renovated ahead of the Super Eagles African Cup of Nations Games 2022 qualifiers game. The renovation included the installation of a grass turf.

== Senior international matches ==
Date	Team 1	Team 2	Score	Competition	Goalscorers	Attendance
23 August 1983	Nigeria	Morocco	0–0	ANC Qualifying	NA	
2 June 2001	Nigeria	Madagascar	1–0	ANC Qualifying	Akwuegbu 5'	15,000
21 June 2003	Nigeria	Angola	2–2	ANC Qualifying	K. Uche 56', Odemwingie 62' (pen.); Figueiredo 9', Akwa 54'	15,000
12 November 2011	Nigeria	Botswana	0–0	Friendly	NA	

== See also ==
- List of stadiums in Nigeria
- Lists of stadiums
