= Abia Angels F.C. =

Abia Angels Football Club
- Ground: Umuahia Township Stadium; Enyimba International Stadium
- Owner: Government of Abia State
- Chairman: Johnson Nwosu
- Manager: Mario Eshalomi
- League: NWFL Premiership
- 2025–26: Regular season: 3rd, Group B Championship round: 4th
- Website: Abia Angels

Abia Angels Football Club is a Nigerian women's football club that is based in Umuahia, Abia State and plays in the NWFL Premiership.

== History ==
The club was founded as Abia Queens by the Abia State Government. They first competed in the second division in the 2014 season. In 2015, they gained promotion to the top-flight, then led by coach Roland Gbaruku, after winning the Pro-League, the second division. In 2021, they escaped relegation after finishing second in the relegation play-offs.

They are the only football club from south-eastern Nigeria currently in the NWFL Premiership.

They are currently managed by Mario Eshalomi. They have been previously managed by former Nigeria international Adanna Nwaneri.

== Players ==
As of the 2025–26 season.

Note: Flags indicate national team as defined under FIFA eligibility rules; some limited exceptions apply. Players may hold more than one non-FIFA nationality.

No.	Pos.	Nation	Player
22	GK	NGR	Fatima Oloko
31	GK	NGR	Chikamso Inyiama
2	DF	NGR	Favour Iheagwaram
3	DF	NGR	Miracle Usani
5	DF	NGR	Lucky Ugbehru
13	DF	NGR	Funmilayo Adefuye
15	DF	NGR	Augustina Unamba
35	DF	NGR	Precious Obasi
39	DF	NGR	Sarah Iloduba
4	MF	NGR	Chinaza Enuma (Captain)
14	MF	NGR	Chidera Okenwa

No.	Pos.	Nation	Player
20	MF	NGR	Perpetual Nyitar
24	MF	NGR	Onyedikachi Ekezie
29	MF	NGR	Gift Chukwu
30	MF	NGR	Blessing Barnabas
40	MF	NGR	Hannah Yusuf
7	FW	NGR	Mariam Abdulrasheed
8	MF	NGR	Joy Jerry
11	FW	NGR	Martha Peter
17	FW	NGR	Blessing Okon
21	FW	NGR	Azeezat Oluwole
26	FW	NGR	Winner David

=== Former players ===
- Chinonyerem Macleans
- Favour Emmanuel
