= Nasarawa Amazons F.C. =

- Full name: Nasarawa Amazons Football Club
- Nickname: Solid Babes
- Founded: 2003
- Ground: Lafia City Stadium
- Owner: Government of Nasarawa State
- Manager: Christopher Danjuma Musa
- League: NWFL Premiership
- 2025–26: Regular season: 2nd, Group B Championship round: 3rd

Nasarawa Amazons F.C. is a women's association football club based in Lafia in Nasarawa State, Nigeria. The club is associated with the men's football club Nasarawa United. The home jersey is green, while the away jersey is white with a diagonal sky blue stripe.

== History ==
The club was founded by the government of Nasarawa State in 2000. The nickname of the club, Solid Babes, is from the official slogan of the state.

They won the Nigeria Women Premier League in 2013 and 2017, and were runners-up in 2006, 2007 and 2016. They have also won the Nigerian Women's Cup thrice, with their recent win in 2026

In 2010, Nasarawa Amazons were evicted from their home camping ground in Lafia for failure to pay accumulated rents.

In 2012, Amazons played Pelican Stars F.C. to qualify for the super six tournament that determines the overall winner of the league.

In 2013, the governor of Nasarawa State, Umaru Tanko Al-Makura, donated ₦ 40,000,000 to aid the running of the club and in recognition of the outstanding performance of the team.

The Amazons were suspended during the 2016 season but were reinstated back to the league after an appeal.

== Current squad ==
Squad list for 2022 season.
Note: Flags indicate national team as defined under FIFA eligibility rules; some limited exceptions apply. Players may hold more than one non-FIFA nationality.

No.	Pos.	Nation	Player
35	GK	NGA	Chioma Nwankwo
32	GK	NGA	Uche Chukwu
34	GK	NGA	Sandra Aernyi
1	GK	NGA	Augustina Boniface
22	DF	NGA	Joy Duru
13	DF	NGA	Sarah Nnodim
4	DF	NGA	Mariam Ibrahim
24	DF	NGA	Mary Ibadin
29	DF	NGA	Ebere Okoye
30	DF	NGA	Juliet Iorliam
27	DF	NGA	Nnenna Okogbua
33	MF	NGA	Amarachi Okoronkwo
28	MF	NGA	Esther Viktor Ekwese

No.	Pos.	Nation	Player
5	MF	NGA	Veronica Idoko
6	MF	NGA	Sikirat Isah
3	MF	NGA	Chythia Emenayo Ugochi
21	MF	NGA	Josephine Mathias
10	MF	NGA	Deborah Ajiboye
16	FW	NGA	Grace Igboamalu
7	FW	NGA	Aishat Bello
11	FW	NGA	Dooshima Tarnum
19	FW	NGA	Adejoke Ejalonibu
20	FW	NGA	Ijeoma Emenike
9	FW	NGA	Alheri Ayuba
12	FW	NGA	Stella Onyekachi

== Management ==
- Head Coach: Christopher Danjuma Musa
- Chairperson : Hajiya Huaina Suleiman Nagogo

== Notable players ==
- Anam Imo
- Mariam Ibrahim
- Chinaza Uchendu
- Amarachi Okoronkwo
- Sarah Nnodim
- Christy Ucheibe

== Honours ==
- Nigeria Women Premier League: Winners (2): 2013, 2017
- Nigerian Women's Cup: Winners(3): 2005, 2019, 2026
