= Sunshine Queens F.C. =

Sunshine Queens FC.
- Full name: Sunshine Queens Football Club
- Nickname: The 'Owena Marmaids’
- Founded: 2005
- Ground: Akure Township Stadium; Akure, Nigeria
- Capacity: 15,000
- President: Akinsola Elvis Akinbobola
- League: NWFL Premiership
- 2025–26: Regular season: 8th, Group B (Relegated)
- Website: http://ondostatefootballagency.com/?tag=sunshine-queens-fc
Home colours	Away colours

Sunshine Queens FC is a women's association football club in Nigeria. They play in the topmost division of female football in the NWFL Premiership. Their home stadium is Akure Township Stadium. The club is one of the running football activities of Ondo State Football Agency. The current head coach is Rafiu Oseni.

== History ==
The club was founded in 2005. It is nicknamed Owena Mermaid, evidently after a prominent river in the state.

== Current squad ==
Squad list for 2022 season.
Note: Flags indicate national team as defined under FIFA eligibility rules; some limited exceptions apply. Players may hold more than one non-FIFA nationality.

No.	Pos.	Nation	Player
28	DF	NGA	Temilade Adepoju Racheal
44	FW	NGA	Aiyeniberun Opeyemi Sunkanmi
21	FW	NGA	Sunday Juliet Chinonso
10	MF	NGA	Aluko Yetunde Maria
37	DF	NGA	Sunday Opeyemi Aanu
27	FW	NGA	Omoh Oyathelemi Tina
9	FW	NGA	Gbadebo Oluwaseyi Janet
18	FW	NGA	Oyewusi Olusola Chioma
17	FW	NGA	Adekunle Adenike Lizzy
29	MF	NGA	Zirike Elizabeth Nkiruka
5	MF	NGA	Yakubu Aminat

No.	Pos.	Nation	Player
33	DF	NGA	Aminu Adeola Wonsebolatan
30	DF	NGA	Ogunrinola Funsho Elizabeth
4	MF	NGA	Akinyinka Taiwo Faith
15	GK	NGA	Johnson Elizabeth
28	MF	NGA	Omosuyi Ayowumi Mama
6	DF	NGA	Alani Aminat Abiodun
32	GK	NGA	Okiemute Rita Obeni
12	MF	NGA	Aderemi Mary Shola
20	DF	NGA	Okoro Chidinma Miracle
16	GK	NGA	Oluchi Tochukwu
24	DF	NGA	Mac Fancy Regina Chikanma
14	MF	NGA	Akpan Glady Nnenenna

== Staff ==
- Sunshine Queens F.C President: Akinsola Elvis Akinbobola
- Sunshine Queens F.C. Vice President : Lateef Fabunmi
- Head of Technical: Prince Moruf Adams
- Head of media: Wahab Bankole
- Head of administration: Richard Aina
- Head of Marketing: Ife Adewunmi
- Technical Director: Paul Ashworth
- Assistant Technical Director: Henry Abiodun
- Players Management: Yussuf Aminu

== Honours ==
- Nigerian Women's Cup - 2015 winner
