= Osun Babes F.C. =

- Full name: Osun Babes Football Club of Osogbo
- Founded: 1995 (disbanded in 2000, then reestablished in 2004)
- Ground: Oshogbo Stadium
- Owner: Osun State Government
- League: NWFL Premiership
- 2025–26: Regular season: 9th, Group B (Relegated)

Osun Babes F.C. (formerly Comfort Queens F.C. and Oyinlola Queens F.C.) is a football club based in Osogbo, Osun State, Nigeria. It was founded in 1995 under the military rule of Anthony Udofia. They participate in the elite division of female football league system in Nigeria. In 2016, the government denied any plan of selling the club to private investors.

== History ==
The club was founded as Comfort Queens F.C. in 1995. It was later renamed to FSP Obi Babes F.C.. The running of the club was terminated by year 2000. The tenure of then governor, Prince Olagunsoye Oyinlola rejuvenated female football in the state and reestablished the club as Oyinlola Queens in 2004, this was later changed to Osun Babes after the election of Governor Rauf Aregbesola in 2011.

In 2017, the club changed some of its symbols to be more representative of the identity of state.

== Current squad ==
Squad list for 2022 season.
Note: Flags indicate national team as defined under FIFA eligibility rules; some limited exceptions apply. Players may hold more than one non-FIFA nationality.

No.	Pos.	Nation	Player
1	GK	NGA	Esther Emawoadia
2	DF	NGA	Shade Ogunniyi
3	DF	NGA	Mamuzo Edaife
7	DF	NGA	Akpojotor Racheal
8	DF	NGA	Iloduba Sarah
10	FW	NGA	Elijah Esther
11	FW	NGA	Suliat Waheed
12	MF	NGA	Ossai Esther
13	FW	NGA	Blessing Afangideh

No.	Pos.	Nation	Player
14	DF	NGA	Loveth Edeh
16	DF	NGA	Oke Yetunde
19	GK	NGA	Imafidon Faith
20	DF	NGA	Nnu Faith
26	DF	NGA	Grace Peter
27	FW	NGA	Abiodun Adedayo
34	FW	NGA	Rejoice Ikoyo
35	MF	NGA	Anthony Esther

== Management ==
- Chairperson - Tola Usman
- Manager - Wole Animashaun
- Secretary - Ronke Ogunbanwo

== Notable former players ==
- Ayisat Yusuf
- Onome Ebi
- Tawa Ishola
- Josephine Chukwunonye
- Ukaonu Onyinye
- Christy Ohiaeriaku
