= Pelican Stars F.C. =

Pelican stars F.C.
- Full name: Pelican Stars Football Club of Calabar
- Founded: 1990
- Ground: U. J. Esuene Stadium, Calabar, Cross River State
- Owner: Government of Cross River State
- Manager: (Nigeria) Adat Egan
- League: Nigeria Women's Football League Championship

Pelican Stars F.C. is a professional women's association football club based in Calabar, Cross River State. Founded in 1990, they play in the Nigeria Women's Football League Championship, the second division for women's football in the country.

In 2015, the team protested against the government for inadequate funding for the club. In 2016, a club spokesperson said to News Agency of Nigeria that new organizational changes in the club would re-position it to redeem its glorious years. In 2017, they defeated newly promoted side Sa'adatu Amazons F.C. in their first game of the season.

== Notable former players ==
- Chinwendu Ihezuo
