= Edo Queens F.C. =

Edo Queens
- Full name: Edo Queens Football Club
- Ground: Samuel Ogbemudia Stadium
- Capacity: 12,000
- Owner: Government of Edo State
- League: NWFL Premiership
- 2025-26: Regular season: 2nd, Group A Championship round: 1st, Champions

Edo Queens Football Club is a Nigerian women's football club based in Edo State, in southern Nigeria. They play in the top women's football league in Nigeria, the NWFL Premiership.

== History ==
Rollanson Odeh was the Queens' head coach until he was suspended at the conclusion of February 2021 after the team's second defeat in the Nigerian Women Football League.

In 2024, Edo Queens won their first ever title, after they finished top of the NWFL premiership. In 2024, they participated in their first Champions League becoming the third Nigerian club to do so, where they finished fourth.

Edo Queens won their second NWFL title in 2026.

== Current squad ==
Squad list for 2024-2025 Season.

Note: Flags indicate national team as defined under FIFA eligibility rules; some limited exceptions apply. Players may hold more than one non-FIFA nationality.

No.	Pos.	Nation	Player
1	GK	NGA	Ihiabi Rabi
14	GK	NGA	Sandra Chichi
2	GK	NGA	Alaba Jonathan
3	DF	NGA	Ayomide Anibaba
7	DF	NGA	Esther Udegbe
8	DF	NGA	Uzoamaka Igwe
10	FW	NGA	Lucky Odiri
11	FW	NGA	Charity Ifenkoh
12	MF	NGA	Blessing Edoho
13	FW	NGA	Lilian Tule
14	FW	NGA	Tegah Okoko

No.	Pos.	Nation	Player
15	DF	NGA	Osas Igbinovia
26	DF	NGA	Chidinma Edeji
27	FW	NGA	Ayo Barakat Olaiya
34	FW	NGA	Yetunde Adeboyejo
35	MF	NGA	Maclean Okogba
34	FW	NGA	Egberi Inamotimi
35	MF	NGA	Doris Ewhubare

== Management ==
- Head Coach: Moses Aduku
- General Manager: Rollanson Odeh
- Scouting Coach: Anthony Ipogah
- Welfare Officer: Princess Omoyemwen Adeyinka Afolabi

== Honours ==
=== International ===
- CAF Women's Champions League
  - Fourth place: 2024
- CAF Women's Champions League WAFU Zone B
  - Champions (2): 2024, 2026

=== Domestic ===
- NWFL Premiership
  - Champions (2): 2023–24, 2025–26
