= Delta Queens F.C. =

- Founded: 2000
- Ground: Stephen Keshi Stadium, Asaba
- Owner: Government of Delta State
- League: NWFL Premiership
- 2025–26: Regular season: 5th, Group B

Delta Queens is a women's football club in Delta State, Nigeria. One of the most successful Nigerian club sides, they compete in the Nigeria Women Premier League, the highest division of female football in the country. They play their home games at Stephen Keshi Stadium in the Delta State capital Asaba. The current head coach of the club is Peter Dedevbo.

== History ==
Delta Queens was formed by the government of Governor James Ibori in January 2000. The administration of the club was headed by Commissioner for Sports, Solomon Ogba.

== Current squad ==
Squad list for 2025 season. Note: Flags indicate national team as defined under FIFA eligibility rules; some limited exceptions apply. Players may hold more than one non-FIFA nationality.

| No. | Pos. | Nation | Player |
|---|---|---|---|
| 1 | GK | NGA | Rita Akarekor |
| 2 | GK | NGA | Maria Nwoko |
| 3 | DF | NGA | Bukky Ogunnoiki |
| 7 | DF | NGA | Joy Jegede |
| 8 | DF | NGA | Etim Margaret |
| 10 | FW | NGA | Ogechi Ukwuoma |
| 11 | FW | NGA | Ijeh Elumunor |
| 12 | MF | NGA | Seun Fakunle |

| No. | Pos. | Nation | Player |
|---|---|---|---|
| 16 | DF | NGA | Godwin Maureen |
| 19 | GK | NGA | Ehiudo Chiudo |
| 20 | DF | NGA | Akpomieme Avwerusou |
| 26 | DF | NGA | Isaac Favour |
| 27 | FW | NGA | Ekong Rose |
| 34 | FW | NGA | Edewor Precious |
| 35 | MF | NGA | Idegwu Blessing |
| 36 | MF | NGA | Ajuyah Jennifer |

== Notable former players ==
This list of notable former players consists of players who have represented their country at the international level.

- Halimatu Ayinde
- Okobi Ngozi
- Vera Okolo

== Honours ==
- Nigerian Women's Cup – 2004, 2006, 2007+2008, 2009
- Nigeria Women Premier League – 2003, 2008, 2009, 2011, 2012, 2022–23
