= NWFL Premiership =

Top-level women's soccer league in Nigeria

- Founded: 1990
- Country: Nigeria
- Confederation: CAF
- Number of clubs: 12
- Level on pyramid: 1
- Relegation to: Nigerian Women Football League Championship
- Domestic cup(s): Nigerian Women's Cup; Champions Shield
- International cup: CAF W-Champions League
- Current champions: Edo Queens (2nd title) (2025-26)
- Most championships: Rivers Angels & Pelican Stars (7 titles)
- Website: The NWFL
- Current: 2025–26 NWFL Premiership

The NWFL Premiership (formerly Nigeria Women Premier League) is the top-level league for women's association football in Nigeria. It is the women's equivalent of the Nigeria Professional Football League (NPFL) for male players. The Nigeria Women Football League (NWFL) organizes the Nigeria Women Premier League and the Nigeria Women Pro-league. In November 2017, Aisha Falode was elected chairperson of the league board, and was officially designated in January 2017.

== History ==
Women's football in Nigeria started in 1978 with the foundation of the NIFFOA (Nigeria Female Football Organising Association), renamed NIFFPA (Nigeria Female Football Proprietors Associations) in 1979, and joined by clubs like Jegede Babes, Ufuoma Babes, Larry Angels, Kakanfo Babes and others. The first championship was organised by the NFA in 1990. Ufuoma Babes were dominant in the 1990s, before succumbing to Pelican Stars, who won the league between 1997 and 2002. By the 2010s, Rivers Angels became more frequent in the super tournaments, a mini-tournament held annually among the top-placed teams, to determine the overall winner of the league. Despite the high frequency of the abridged format over the years, the 2014 league season saw a straight round-robin season in determining the league winners. However, by 2015, there was a reintroduction of the group system.

Since 2015, the league has enjoyed considerable success and improvement under the auspices of Aisha Falode, and have produced several players for the national team and cadet teams, with more than 70% of players who have been capped for the national team having played in the NWFL. Since 2021, the league winners qualifies for the CAF Women's Champions League.

In the 2024 season, Edo Queens became the newest champions with their debut league win.

== Renaming ==
On 5 March 2020, the Nigeria Women Football League, the governing body of professional women's association football in Nigeria, announced the re-branding of the women's league, by unveiling a new logo and renaming the three tiers of the league under the tutelage of the NWFL.

With the rebranding, the Nigeria Women Premier League is now known as the NWFL Premiership, the second-tier league known as NWFL Championship (formerly NWFL Pro-League) while the third-tier division becomes the NWFL Nationwide (formerly NWFL Amateur League).

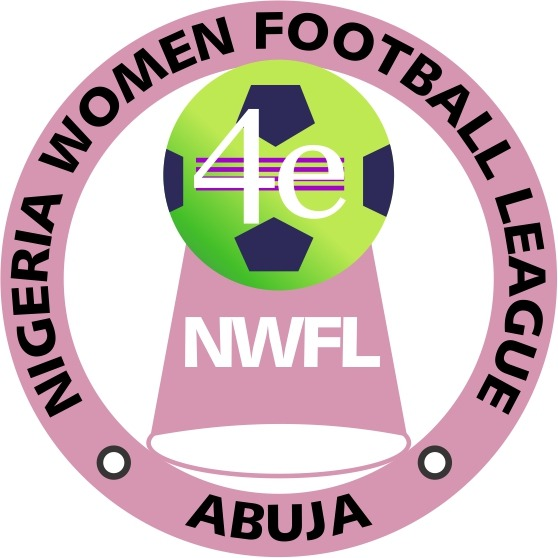
The old NWFL logo

== Format ==
The women's top division league in Nigeria usually follows an abridged format with a super tournament at the end of the season. The top teams in each group (sometimes 1, 2 or 3) will form the super tournament at the end of the regular season to determine the overall winner of the league. The last placed teams are normally relegated to the second division, while promoted teams from the lower division are also admitted into the league. Despite the high frequency of the abridged format over the years, the 2014 league season saw a straight round robin season in determining the league winners, however by 2015, there was a reintroduction of the group system.

== Champions ==
The list of champions and runners-ups:

Year	Champions	Runners-up
1990	Jegede Babes	
1991	Mande River State (River Mermaids)	
1992	Ufuoma Babes	
1993	Ufuoma Babes	
1994	Rivers Angels SC	Jegede Babes
1995	Ufuoma Babes	Pelican Stars FC
1996	Ufuoma Babes	
1997	Pelican Stars FC	
1998	Pelican Stars FC	
1999	Pelican Stars FC	FCT Queens
2000	Pelican Stars FC	FCT Queens
2001	Pelican Stars FC	FCT Queens
2002	Pelican Stars FC	FCT Queens
2003	Delta Queens FC	FCT Queens
2004	Bayelsa Queens	Pelican Stars FC
2005	Pelican Stars FC	Bayelsa Queens
2006	Bayelsa Queens	Nasarawa Amazons
2007	Bayelsa Queens	Nasarawa Amazons
2008	Delta Queens FC	Bayelsa Queens
2009	Delta Queens FC	Rivers Angels
2010	Rivers Angels/Pelican Stars (Note: There was no Super tournament this season but Pelican Stars topped group A, while Rivers Angels topped group B in the regular season)	
2011	Delta Queens FC	River Angels SC
2012	Delta Queens FC	River Angels SC
2013	Nasarawa Amazons	Rivers Angels
2014	Rivers Angels	Pelican Stars FC
2015	Rivers Angels	Bayelsa Queens
2016	Rivers Angels	Nasarawa Amazons
2017	Nasarawa Amazons	Delta Queens
2018	Bayelsa Queens	Nasarawa Amazons
2019	Rivers Angels	Confluence Queens
2020	Not held due to the COVID-19 pandemic	
2020–21	Rivers Angels	Delta Queens
2021–22	Bayelsa Queens	Nasarawa Amazons
2022–23	Delta Queens	Bayelsa Queens
2023–24	Edo Queens	Rivers Angels
2024–25	Bayelsa Queens	Nasarawa Amazons
2025–26	Edo Queens	Bayelsa Queens

== Most successful clubs ==
Club	Champions	Runners-up	Winning seasons	Runners-up seasons
Pelican Stars FC (Calabar)	8	3	1997, 1998, 1999, 2000, 2001, 2002, 2005, 2010 (Note: Shared title)	1995, 2004, 2014
Rivers Angels SC (Port Harcourt)	7	5	1994, 2010, 2014, 2015, 2016, 2019, 2020–21	2009,2011, 2012,2013, 2023–24
Bayelsa Queens (Yenagoa)	6	5	2004, 2006, 2007, 2018, 2021–22, 2024–25	2005, 2008, 2015, 2022–23, 2025–26
Delta Queens FC (Asaba)	6	2	2003, 2008, 2009, 2011, 2012, 2022–23	2017, 2020–21
Ufuoma Babes (Warri)	4	–	1992, 1993, 1995, 1996	–
Nasarawa Amazons (Nasarawa)	2	6	2013, 2017	2006, 2007, 2016, 2018, 2021–22, 2024–25
Edo Queens (Benin City)	2	–	2023–24, 2025–26	–
Jegede Babes (Lagos)	1	1	1990	1995
Mande River State (Port Harcourt)	1	–	1991	–

== Individual honours ==
=== Top scorers ===
Year	Player	Team	Goals
2013	Asisat Oshoala	Rivers Angels	6
2014	Amarachi Orjinma	Pelican Stars	17
2015	Rofiat Sule	Bayelsa Queens	11
2016	Rofiat Sule	Bayelsa Queens	9
2017	Reuben Charity	Ibom Angels	8
2017	Rasheedat Ajibade	FC Robo	8
2018	Anam Imo	Nasarawa Amazons	8
2019	Anjor Mary	Bayelsa Queens	6
2020–21	Gift Monday	FC Robo	10 (Note: Regular season only)
2021–22	Gift Monday	Bayelsa Queens	10 (Note: Regular season only)
2022–23	Mercy Omokwu	Delta Queens	9
2023–24	Folashade Ijamilusi	Robo Queens	8
2024–25	Bolaji Olamide	Remo Stars Ladies	15
2025–26	Uwah Abasiofon; Doosuur Atume	Rivers Angels; Edo Queens	13

=== Player of the Season ===
Year	Player	Team
2015	Emueje Ogbiagbevha (super 6 only)	Nasarawa Amazons
2016	Rofiat Sule	Bayelsa Queens
2017	Rasheedat Ajibade	FC Robo
2018	Anam Imo	Nasarawa Amazons

== See also ==
- List of women's football clubs in Nigeria
- Nigerian Women's Cup
- Nigeria Women's Super Cup
