= Confluence Queens F.C. =

Nigerian women's football club

- Full name: Confluence Queens Football Club of Lokoja
- Nickname: Respect All Fear None
- Founded: 12 February 1993; 33 years ago
- Ground: Confluence Stadium, Lokoja
- Capacity: 25,000
- Owner: Kogi State Government (since 2006)
- Chairman: Mallam Abdul Sule
- Manager: Tosin Ojo
- League: NWFL Premiership
- 2025–26: Regular season: 10th, Group B (Relegated)

Confluence Queens F.C. sometimes referred to as Wada Queens and Kogi Confluence Queens is a Nigerian women's association football club based in Lokoja, Kogi State. They play their home games at Confluence Stadium, and compete in the Nigeria Women Premier League, the highest tier of female football league system in Nigeria.

== History ==
Confluence Queens was established by David Ayo Owolabi in 1993, a prominent figure on female football matters in the state. In 2006, after the club gained promotion to the second division for the first time, the state government led by Governor Ibrahim Idris provided funds and took over the administrative control of the team. In 2009, Confluence Queens was promoted to the elite division for the first time in her history. When the pro-league was re-branded to the Nigeria Women Premier League in 2013, Confluence Queens was one of the twelve teams selected to compete in the inaugural season. Honorable Abdul Adama was appointed chairman of the club but resigned in 2015.

== Current squad ==
Squad list for 2019 season.
Note: Flags indicate national team as defined under FIFA eligibility rules; some limited exceptions apply. Players may hold more than one non-FIFA nationality.

| No. | Pos. | Nation | Player |
|---|---|---|---|
| 2 | DF | NGA | Ogechi Joseph |
| 3 | DF | NGA | Nike Olonilua |
| 7 | DF | NGA | Tobiloba Olanrewaju |
| 8 | DF | NGA | Chima Fabiyi |
| 10 | FW | NGA | Bola Oladiti |
| 11 | FW | NGA | Bukola Awolusi |
| 12 | MF | NGA | Helen Ugah |
| 13 | FW | NGA | Ada Ella |
| 12 | MF | NGA | Seun Atanda |

| No. | Pos. | Nation | Player |
|---|---|---|---|
| 14 | DF | NGA | Lola Philips |
| 16 | DF | NGA | Emenike Ijeoma |
| 19 | GK | NGA | Seun Bello |
| 20 | DF | NGA | Florence Alexander |
| 26 | DF | NGA | Maureen Okpalla |
| 27 | FW | NGA | Aishat Bello |
| 34 | FW | NGA | Ganiyat Adeleke |
| 35 | MF | NGA | Aluko Mariam |
| 13 | FW | NGA | Toyla Maureen |

== Notable former players ==
- Kemi Fatuyesi
