= Rivers Angels F.C. =

Nigerian women's football club

- Full name: Rivers Angels Football Club
- Founded: 1986
- Ground: Port Harcourt, Rivers State, Nigeria
- Owner: Government of Rivers State (since 1991)
- Manager: Whyte Ogbonda
- League: Nigerian Women's Championship
- 2025–26: Regular season: 3rd, Group A Championship group: 5th

Rivers Angels F.C. (formerly Larry Angels F.C.) is a Nigerian professional football club based in Port Harcourt, Rivers State in Nigeria. They play in the Nigeria Women Premier League, the top flight in the national female soccer league pyramid.

== History ==
The club was established as Larry Angels F.C. in 1986 by Prince Lawrence Ezeh, a native of Mbaise in Imo State. In 1991, the government of Rivers State took control of the club through the first lady of the state, Mrs Abbe. They came tops at the introduction of female football at the National Sports Festival, held in the then capital, Lagos State in 1989. They also won the maiden edition of Olu of Warri cup held in Warri, Delta State. Nigerian Olympic gold medalist, Chioma Ajunwa was the captain of the team between 1988 and 1990.

== Current squad ==
Squad list for 2022 season.
Note: Flags indicate national team as defined under FIFA eligibility rules; some limited exceptions apply. Players may hold more than one non-FIFA nationality.

No.	Pos.	Nation	Player
12	GK	NGR	Charity John
1	GK	NGR	Ibubeleye Whyte
29	DF	NGR	Margaret Etim
25	DF	NGR	Mabel Effiom
28	DF	NGR	Ologbosere Nunumwen Mary
34	DF	NGR	Joseph Vivian Uju
5	DF	NGR	Kenneth Catherine Ijeoma
26	DF	NGR	Ifeoma Ikenokwalu
4	DF	NGR	Blessing Ezekiel
11	MF	NGR	Glory Iroka
11	MF	NGR	Hannah Yusuf
19	MF	NGR	Martina Ohadugha
24	MF	NGR	Mary Saiki

No.	Pos.	Nation	Player
10	MF	NGR	Cecilia Nku
8	FW	NGR	Amarachi Ojinma
18	FW	NGR	Juliet Sunday
7	FW	NGR	Ibinabo Georgewill
2	FW	NGR	Arit Itu Usang
13	FW	NGR	Paulinus Ifeoma
9	FW	NGR	Amaechi Ojini
31	FW	NGR	Yetunde Adeboyejo

== Management ==
- Head Coach: Edwin Okon
- Team Manager: Matilda Otuene

== Recent seasons ==
Season	Tier	Group	Place	Aiteo Cup
2010	1	1^{b}	1st in 1^{b}	winners
2011	1	1^{b}	2nd	winners
2012	1	1^{b}	2nd	winners
2013	1	1^{b}	2nd	winners
2014	1	not applicable	1st	winners
2015	1	1^{b}	1st	Quarter-finalist
2016	1	1^{b}	1st	winners
2017	1	1^{a}	4th	winners
2018	1	1^{a}	4th	winners
2019	1	1^{a}	1st	2nd
2020–21	1	1^{a}	1st in Super 6	–

== Former players ==
- Juanita Aguadze
- Chioma Ajunwa (captain between 1988 and 1990)
- Florence Ajayi
- Ebere Orji
- Francisca Ordega
- Ulunma Jerome
- Ayisat Yusuf
- Gloria Chinasa
- Stella Mbachu
- Uche Eucharia
- Cathy Bou Ndjouh
- Evelyn Nwabuoku
- Stella Mbachu
- Ngozi Ebere
- Elizabeth Addo
- Asisat Oshoala
- Oluwatosin Demehin

== Honours ==
- Nigerian Women's Championship: (7)

2020–21, 2019, 2016, 2015, 2014, 2010, 1994.

- Nigerian Women's Cup: (10)

2025, 2024, 2018, 2017, 2016, 2014, 2013, 2012, 2011, 2010

- Nigeria Women's Super Cup: (1)

2018

- Olu of Warri Cup: (1)

1989

- National Sports Festival: (1)

1989 female football event winners
