= Bayelsa Queens F.C. =

Nigerian women's football club

- Full name: Bayelsa Queens Football Club
- Nickname: The Restoration Girls
- Founded: 2000
- Owner: Government of Bayelsa State
- Chairman: Robin Apreala
- League: NWFL Premiership
- 2025–26: Regular season: 1st, Group A Championship round: 2nd, Runners-up
- Website: https://bayelsaqueensfootballclub.ng/

Bayelsa Queens is a women's football club based in Yenagoa, Bayelsa State, Nigeria. They play in the top tier of the women's football league pyramid in Nigeria. They have won the NWFL Premiership six times and finished runners-up on four occasions. The current head coach of the club is Whyte Ogbonda. The official website of the Bayelsa Queens Football Club is https://bayelsaqueensfootballclub.ng/

== History ==
Bayelsa Queens was founded by former governor of Bayelsa State Diepreye Alamieyeseigha in 2000. The NWFL board documents that the club was the first female club in Nigeria to have her pre-season abroad in 2007.

The club is also known as Restoration Girls, a name motivated by the government of the state.

== Results and fixtures ==
Legend

Win Draw Lose Fixture

=== 2022 ===
27 October 2022 Friendly	Bayelsa Queens (Nigeria)	11-0	(Morocco) Racing Athletic Casablanca	Rabat, Morocco
		Report (CAF)		Stadium: Stade Moulay Hassan

31 October 2022 2022 CAF Women's Champions League GS	Mamelodi Sundowns (South Africa)	2-1	(Nigeria) Bayelsa Queens	Marrakesh, Morocco
17:00	Daweti 32', 58'	Report (CAF)	Anjor 81'	Stadium: Stade de Marrakech; Referee: Shamirah Nabadda (Uganda)

3 November 2022 2022 CAF Women's Champions League GS	TP Mazembe (Democratic Republic of the Congo)	0-2	(Nigeria) Bayelsa Queens	Marrakesh, Morocco
17:00	Daweti 32', 58'	Report (CAF)	Joseph 4' (pen.); Chinyere 24'	Stadium: Stade de Marrakech

== Current squad ==
Squad list for 2025 Season.

Note: Flags indicate national team as defined under FIFA eligibility rules; some limited exceptions apply. Players may hold more than one non-FIFA nationality.

No.	Pos.	Nation	Player
1	GK	NGA	Ihiabi Rabi
14	GK	NGA	Sandra Chichi
2	GK	NGA	Alaba Jonathan
3	DF	NGA	Ayomide Anibaba
7	DF	NGA	Esther Udegbe
10	FW	NGA	Lucky Odiri
11	FW	NGA	Charity Ifenkoh
12	MF	NGA	Blessing Edoho
13	FW	NGA	Lilian Tule
14	FW	NGA	Tegah Okoko

No.	Pos.	Nation	Player
15	DF	NGA	Osas Igbinovia
26	DF	NGA	Chidinma Edeji
27	FW	NGA	Ayo Barakat Olaiya
34	FW	NGA	Yetunde Adeboyejo
35	MF	NGA	Maclean Okogba
34	FW	NGA	Egberi Inamotimi
35	MF	NGA	Doris Ewhubare

== Honours ==
=== International ===
- CAF Women's Champions League

Third place: 2022

- CAF Women's Champions League WAFU Zone B

Winners (1): 2022

=== Domestic ===
- Nigeria Women Premier League

Champions (6): 2004, 2006, 2007, 2018, 2021–22, 2024–25

- Aiteo Cup

Winners (1): 2021

- Nigeria Women's Super Cup

Winners (1): 2019

- Sheroes Cup: 2020
- Betsy Obaseki Women Football Tournament: 2021
