= FC Robo =

FC Robo (Queens) International
- Full name: FC Robo International, Lagos
- Founded: 19 April 1999; 27 years ago
- Ground: FIFA Goal project (Legacy) turf, National Stadium, Lagos
- Capacity: 3,000
- Manager: (Nigeria) Emmanuel Osahon
- League: NWFL Premiership
- 2025–26: Regular season: 1st, Group B Championship round: 6th

FC Robo Queens is a Nigerian women's association football club based in Mushin, Lagos and a member of the Nigerian Women Football League (NWFL). They have competed in the Nigeria Women Premier League, the highest division for women association football in the country.

The club has produced several players for the Nigerian national team and players that have gone on to play at professional women clubs from across the globe. BBC and Two-time African footballer of the year, Asisat Oshoala, along with Esther Sunday and Rasheedat Ajibade, are all products of the club's academy and youth programs.

Asisat Oshoala served as an ambassador of the club in 2016, in a move to help uplift the business brand and image of the club.

== History ==
FC Robo International, owners of FC Robo Queens is a privately owned professional football club from Lagos, Nigeria. Founded on the 19th of April by Osahon Emmanuel Orobosa, a veteran of the Nigerian football league, primarily as a football academy for boys but soon expanded to accommodate girls/women program.

== Current squad ==
Squad list for 2025.
Note: Flags indicate national team as defined under FIFA eligibility rules; some limited exceptions apply. Players may hold more than one non-FIFA nationality.

No.	Pos.	Nation	Player
27	GK	NGR	Damilola Amole
14	DF	NGR	Omobola Falese
16	DF	NGR	Esther Ndubisi
8	MF	NGR	Maria Oke
15	MF	NGR	Mary Okereke
23	MF	NGR	Islamiat Raji
13	MF	NGR	Olabiyi Folajomi
22	GK	NGR	Adegbite Bukola
17	FW	NGR	Helen Christopher
11		NGR	B. Aliu
3		NGR	C. B. Ajeh

No.	Pos.	Nation	Player
2		NGR	O. Emeka
28	MF	NGR	M. Yusuf
35	GK	NGR	Rita Igwe
—		NGR	Adeyemo Fasilat
—		NGR	Akinwande Kehind
—		NGR	Ogbuchi Chidinma
—		NGR	Jamilusi Shade
—		NGR	Shobowale Rukayat
—		NGR	Onyenezide Esther
—		NGR	oladiti Rukayat
—		NGR	Lawal Taiwo
—		NGR	Oladipupo Shukurat

== Notable former players ==
- Asisat Oshoala
- Rasheedat Ajibade
- Esther Sunday
