= List of football clubs in Nigeria =

Association Football Clubs in Nigeria

This is a list of association football clubs located in Nigeria. For a complete list see Category:Football clubs in Nigeria

== A ==
- Abia Comets F.C.
- Abia Warriors F.C.
- Abiola Babes
- Ablaze FC
- ABS FC
- Abuja F.C.
- ACB Lagos
- Adamawa United F.C.
- Akwa Starlets FC
- Akwa United F.C.
- Atlantic Business FC
- Anambra Pillars F.C.
- Anambra United F.C.
- Anioma Sporting FC
- Apa United FC

== B ==
- Babanawa F.C.
- Bayelsa United F.C.
- BCC Lions
- Bendel Insurance F.C.
- Bridge Boys F.C.
- Bussdor United F.C.
- Box2Box F.C

== C ==
- COD United F.C.
- Calabar Rovers
- Collins Edwin F.C.
- Crown F.C.
- Cynosure FC of Ebonyi state

== D ==
- Dalhatu United
- DSS FC
- Delta Force F.C.
- Doma United F.C.

== E ==
- El-Kanemi Warriors
- Enugu Rangers
- Enyimba International F.C.
- Esan F.C.
- First Bank F.C.
- Fountain FC

== G ==
- Gateway United F.C.
- Giwa FC
- Go Round F.C.
- Gombe United F.C.
- Gbagada Fc

== H ==
- Heartland F.C.
- Henrich FC

== I ==
- Ifeanyi Ubah F.C
- Ikorodu United F.C.
- Ilesa Dynamos F.C.
- FC Inter Enugu
- Ikorodu City F.C.

== J ==
- Jasper United
- Jigawa Golden Stars F.C.
- JUTH F.C.

== K ==
- Kada City F.C.
- Kaduna United F.C.
- Kano Pillars F.C.
- Kogi United
- Kwara United F.C.
- Knights F.C. Ife
- Karamone F.C. Ife

== L ==
- Leventis United
- Lobi Stars F.C.

== M ==
- MFM FC
- Mighty Jets F.C.
- My People FC
- Milars Football Club
- Messiah FC
- Mbalala FC
- Maryland De Galaxy FA

== N ==
- NAF Rockets F.C.
- Nasarawa United F.C.
- Nembe City F.C.
- NEPA Lagos
- New Nigeria Bank F.C.
- Niger Tornadoes F.C.
- NITEL Vasco Da Gama F.C.

== O ==
- Oasis Football Club
- Ocean Boys F.C.
- Owazi F.C
- Obio Akpor Football Club

== P ==
- Plateau United F.C.
- Prime F.C.

== R ==
- Racca Rovers
- Ranchers Bees FC
- Remo FC
- Rising Stars F.C.
- Rivers United F.C.

== S ==
- Sharks F.C.
- Shooting Stars SC
- Sokoto United
- Spotlight F.C.
- Star Base Football Club
- Stationery Stores F.C.
- Sunshine Stars F.C.
- Sunsel F.C.
- Super 11 F.C.
- Sporting Lagos FC

== T ==
- Taraba F.C.
- TEAP FC

== U ==
- Udoji United F.C.
- Ughelli Rovers F.C.
- Union Bank F.C.

== V ==
Vandrezzer F.C.

== W ==
- Warri Wolves F.C.
- Westside F.C.
- Wikki Tourists F.C.
- Wolonso United F.C.

== Y ==
Yankari Babes FC

== Z ==
- Zabgai Fc of bauchi
- Zamfara United F.C.

== See also ==
List of football clubs in Nigeria by major honours won
