= Ilesa Dynamos F.C. =

Nigerian football club

Ilesa Dynamos FC
- Full name: Dynamos Football Club of Iléṣà
- Ground: Iléṣà, Nigeria
- Manager: Adetunji Adejuwon
- League: Nigeria Amateur League
Home colours	Away colours

Iléṣà Dynamos F.C. is a Nigerian football club, in the town of Iléṣà, in Osun State. They play in the third level of professional football in Nigeria, the Nigeria Amateur League Division 1. After finishing 2nd in their second division group in 2010, they were promoted to balance fixtures in the Amateur Division I when other teams could not make their games.

They were involved in a melee in July 2011 that led to five life bans and their ground banned from being used after fans and players attacked referees after a league game. The bans were commuted in February 2012 after they were relegated back to the second division.

== Current squad ==
Note: Flags indicate national team as defined under FIFA eligibility rules; some limited exceptions apply. Players may hold more than one non-FIFA nationality.

No.	Pos.	Nation	Player
1	GK	NGA	Emma Babatunde
2		NGA	Rasheed Ahmed
3		NGA	Tosin Bello
4	DF	NGA	Adebowale Olayeni-capt
6		NGA	Busuyi Bebo
7	DF	NGA	Segun Makinde
8	FW	NGA	Oluseun Dauda
9		NGA	Olawale Adigun
10		NGA	Samson Kayode

No.	Pos.	Nation	Player
12		NGA	Ibeh Ikechukwu
13		NGA	Johnson Olafemi
14		NGA	Fatai Abdullahi
15		NGA	Momoh Yakubu
16		NGA	Kofoworola Ahmed
17		NGA	Kehinde Ogunyemi
33	GK	NGA	Lekan Okeleye
—		NGA	
