= Football in Nigeria =

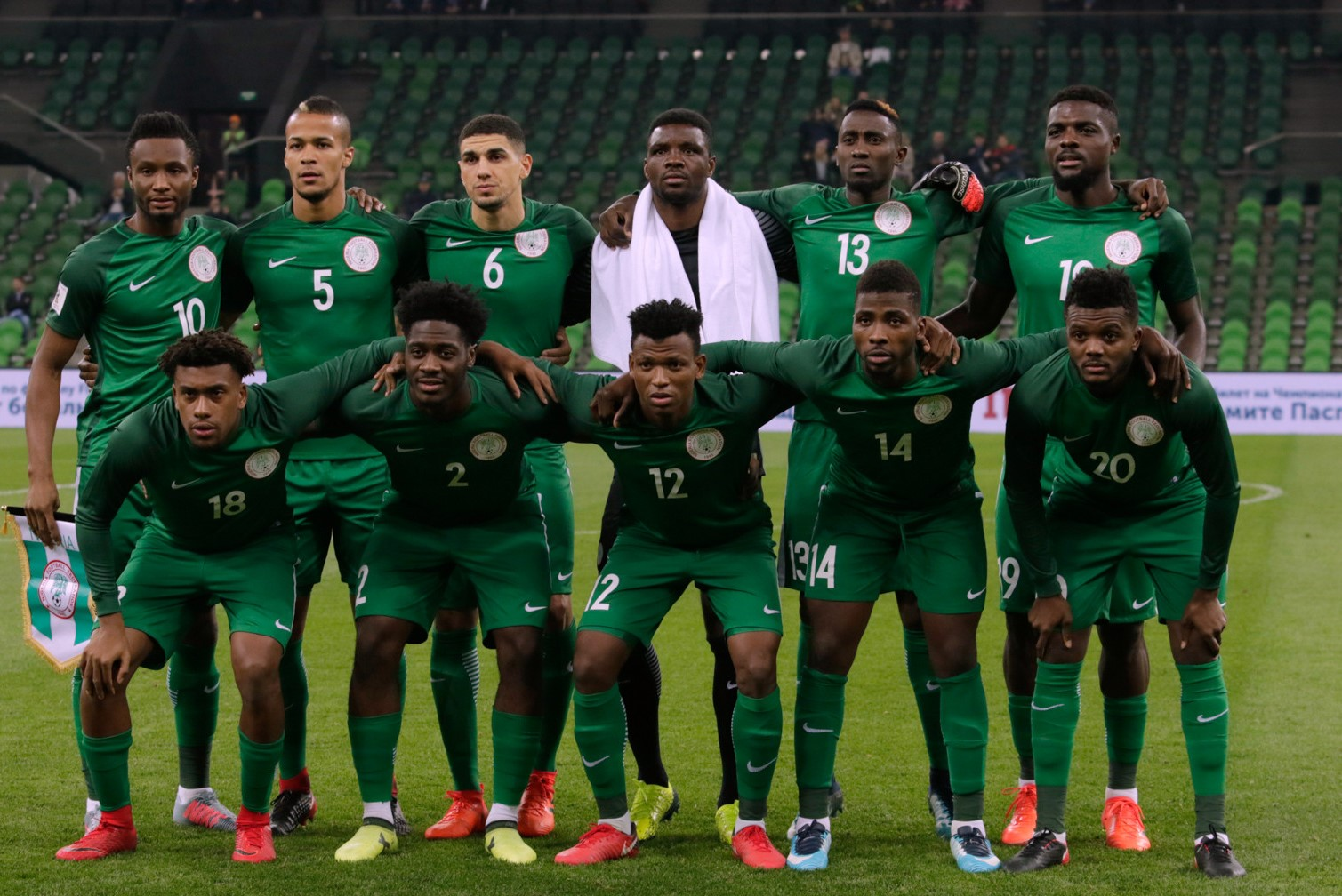
- Nigeria vs Argentina friendly match line up in 2018
- Country: Nigeria
- Governing body: Nigeria Football Federation
- National team: Men's · Women's
- First played: 1904

National competitions
- Africa Cup of Nations; FIFA World Cup

Club competitions
- League: Nigeria Premier Football League; Nigeria National League; Nigeria Nationwide League; Cups: Federation Cup

International competitions
- CAF Champions League; CAF Confederation Cup; CAF Super Cup; FIFA Club World Cup

With about 40% of the population following, football is the most popular sport in Nigeria. The Nigeria national football team competes regularly for international titles and many Nigerian footballers compete in Europe, particularly in England. Nigeria has one of the finest national teams in Africa and has produced many notable footballers including Mudashiru Lawal, Rashidi Yekini, Jay Jay Okocha, Nwankwo Kanu, Vincent Enyeama, Joseph Yobo, Mikel John Obi and Victor Osimhen.

In tracing its growing popularity within the nation, Nigerian football can be traced back to football's implementation in schools, particularly in Calabar. From there, it would only spread throughout Nigeria. Despite an eventual civil war, the eventual creation of Enugu Rangers post-civil war would only continue to build the sense of community Nigeria would become known for.

Polling shows the majority of Nigerians watch international and domestic football. Due to the number of Nigerian players in the English Premier League and the fact that Nigeria is an English-speaking country, the majority of Nigerians support an English club. The most popular football clubs in Nigeria are Chelsea, Manchester United and Arsenal. Spanish clubs Real Madrid and Barcelona are also popular among Nigerians.

== History ==
Football was first introduced to Nigeria by the British at the start of the 20th century. Having been brought to Nigeria, specifically in Calabar and Lagos at first, the first football game would then be recorded on June 15, 1904, at an elite school in Calabar. The school, Hope Waddell Training Institution, would see the attended elite students often face off against docked sailors on a local football field.

This would eventually lead to the creation and implementation of the Beverly Cup in 1906, known as one of the very first soccer tournaments contested in the western part of Africa.

The spread of football to Nigeria in a general sense occurred through the works of Christian Missionaries as well as nations seeking to colonize; what made schools play a role in the spreading of the sport was the physical growth missionaries wished to see in children. It was a pastime to keep them fit while also educating them about the inner workings of Catholicism, teaching them about discipline and boosting morale. From it, the spread of football would continue amongst schools, a direct result of the involvement of alumni from Hope Waddell. This spread would be seen in the area of Lagos.

Around the 1950s, in Africa, many nations began to partake in nationalist movements where they protested colonial power. In Nigeria, football gave citizens a sense of national pride and inspired them to achieve political freedom. Nnamdi Azikiwe the first president, played a critical role in helping Nigeria achieve its freedom from Britain.

Peter Alegi, associate professor of history at Michigan State University, states, "Nnamdi Azikiwe emerged as a key figure connecting sports and politics in the late colonial period". Throughout his life, Azikiwe was angered by the racism and racial segregation that existed in sports. There were two particular events in his life that motivated him to finally take action. The first event was when "he was denied the opportunity to compete in a track-and-field event at the 1934 Empire Games because Nigeria was not allowed to participate", the second event was when his application to join a tennis club in Lagos was rejected because of his Igbo background. These events resulted in Azikiwe creating the Zik's Athletic Club (ZAC) in Lagos in April 1938. This sports club had facilities and equipment for many sports such as football, boxing, and tennis. The club quickly became a symbol of African self-determination and nationalism in Nigeria.

Throughout the course of World War II, Azikiwe continuously criticized the British for fighting in a war for democracy, yet at the same time, oppress Africans from self-determination. To spread his ideas and popularize the game of football, Azikiwe went on numerous tours across Nigeria during the war. He also established a nationalist newspaper, the West African Pilot, in 1937. This newspaper popularized the game of football in Nigeria and made it a crucial aspect of the nation's identity. It helped establish a greater sense of community within Nigeria and developed pan-African sentiments. The paper also played a critical role in raising attention about social consciousness. Through its coverage of football, the Pilot was able to achieve its mission. By the end of the war, football had become a cornerstone of Nigeria's identity. On October 1, 1960, Nigeria finally gained its independence from Britain. This year also saw Nigeria become a member of FIFA. Nnamdi Azikiwe went on to become the first President of Nigeria in 1963.

=== Biafra War ===
Taking place several years after the gaining of Nigerian independence, The Biafra War refers to the internal conflict between the republic of Nigeria and the republic of Biafra (collectively made of the Igbo). After the Igbo faced prosecution in the Northern part of Nigeria, they eventually split off from them, declaring independence in a new nation under the name Biafra. Football players were also subject to the impact of this war, Igbo players fleeing East due to a renewed fear.

Notable players such as Godwin Achebe, Luke 'Jazz Buchana' Okpala, and John 'Wheeler' Nwosu were just some who fled to the East out of fear. Even after the war, they remained there, Nwosu winning the Nigerian FA Cup with Lagos Railways (1964), and Achebe and Okpala winning the same cup with the Lagos ECN.

The war took on a meaning beyond making a claim to land, instead being about how the nation of Nigeria should go about rebuilding and redeveloping.

Football, in the fight for their independence, was used as a form of resistance and defiance for Nigeria mainly because of the sense of community and unity it provided to the people. Such was a similar case in the Biafra War, certainly in its aftermath. Football (and other sports) was utilized in the course of the rebuilding nation; not only was it an excellent source of leisure time, but it also once again contributed to the re-development of the community.

=== Enugu Rangers and their contributions to Nigerian Football ===
Specifically, Enugu Rangers played a significant and credible role in the reconstruction process, especially given that its birth came at the end of the Civil Qar. Spearheaded by Jerry Enyeazu and Nwadiegwu, both majors of the Biafran army, it was formed in 1970, composed of young Biafran men. In the wake of the war ending in 1970, it was thus a strong symbol for the Igbo people; from hope to unity, this club embodied the desires of the people to rediscover their identity and to rebuild accordingly.

Enugu Rangers contributed heavily in sport development in Nigeria by providing a platform for young players from Southern Nigeria to play and progress their professional careers. Enugu Rangers also partnered with FC Schaffhausen, opening up a pathway for Nigerian players to play for clubs from around the world. Enugu Rangers have a strong financial sustainability by securing a long-term sponsorship deal with Afrinvest and Noctra Tractors. Through these funds, they revitalized their facility infrastructure and established a strong social media presence as a way to engage with their fans.

At the 1980 African Cup of Nations, the captain of the Enugu Rangers, Christian Chukwu led the national team to its maiden victory. That victory continued to strengthen the sense of union within Nigeria.

== Corruption in Nigeria Football ==
The Nigerian Football Federation has faced many allegation of financial mismanagement, bribery, favoritism, and political interference. The unethical practices also come from the players where they bribed officials and national coaches to be picked for the national team. These acts did not just lose trust from the fans but also deter sponsorship and investments due to them not wanting to be associated with a league that faced many scandals and poor management. One factor that allowed corruption to persist in the Nigerian Football ecosystem is the undercover of the press. Despite there are more than 140 corruption stories being reported, most of them are placed on the inside page, and they were reported as isolated scandals rather than a systematic issue within the Nigerian Football Federation.

It has been reported in the past that players are required to pay some amount of money in order to earn a call-ups to the national teams. There have also been situations whereby players called to the national teams are selected by nepotism or other corrupt methods.

== National competitions ==
Level	League
1	Nigeria Professional Football League; 20 clubs ↓relegate 4 teams
2	Nigeria National League; 36 clubs ↑↓promote 4 teams, relegate as many as 12 teams
3	Nigeria Nationwide League as many as 40 clubs ↑↓promote as many as 12 teams

== National team ==
The Nigeria national football team, nicknamed the Super Eagles, is the national team of Nigeria and is controlled by the Nigeria Football Association. According to the FIFA World Rankings, Nigeria, at 39th, are currently the 5th best team in the Confederation of African Football.

The Nigeria national football team played their first international match against Sierra Leone in Freetown on 8 October 1949. Nigeria won 2–0. Their biggest win recorded was 16–1 against Benin.

Nigeria's best performances at the World Cup are the 1994, 1998, and 2014 where they reached the second round. Nigeria also won the first-ever Unity World Cup in 2014.

=== Youth ===
Nigeria's youth teams won the inaugural FIFA U-17 World Cup in 1985 as well as in 1993, 2007, 2013, 2015. The under-17 team is known as the Golden Eaglets and Under-20 team is known as the "Flying Eagles".

Nigeria's Flying Eagles qualified for the first time to represent Africa in the 1983 FIFA World Youth Championship in Mexico. Although Nigeria did not go beyond the first round, they beat the highly rated USSR 1-0 and held the Netherlands to a goalless draw.

In 1985, the under-17 football team went to China and conquered the world in the first ever FIFA U-17 World Championship. The victory took Nigerian youth football to a high pedestal, setting the stage for a respect of Nigeria in international competitions. The under-20 team went to Saudi Arabia for the 1989 FIFA World Youth Championship and lost narrowly in the final to Portugal. The team pulled off the now-legendary "Miracle of Damman", erasing a 4–0 deficit to the Soviet Union to tie and then win the match by penalties. In 2007, the under-17 squad were crowned world champions in South Korea for the 3rd time. Nigeria hosted the 1999 FIFA World Youth Championship and the 2009 FIFA U-17 World Cup.

=== U-23 ===
==== 1996 Olympic Games ====
In the 1996 Summer Olympics in Atlanta, the Nigerian men’s football team became the first ever African nation to achieve a gold medal in football. They became known as the “Dream Team” due to this accomplishment. The journey to get there wasn’t easy, as the team faced many financial and administrative challenges, and many players had to make sacrifices to be able to play.

The tournament started off rough with a loss to Brazil, but they were able to bounce back and advance into the knockout stage. In the quarter-finals, Nigeria defeated Mexico 2 - 0, then a semi-final rematch with Brazil. Nigeria came from 3 - 1 down to win 4 - 3 through a golden goal. In the final, they went up against Argentina, a football powerhouse. They fell behind twice, but were able to tie it up through a goal by Daniel Amokachi. Then, Emmanuel Amunike scored a late winner to secure a 3 - 2 victory and the gold medal.

This achievement had a great impact on Nigerian and African football, improving the country's reputation and inspiring a generation of players. Many players on the Dream Team, including Nwankwo Kanu, Jay-Jay Okocha, and Taribo West, went on to have successful careers. However, years later, some players expressed disappointment that the promises that the government made after the victory were not fully honored.

Nigeria’s 1996 Olympic football gold medal was a great achievement for the team, creating the beginning of a new era in Nigerian and African football.

== Local football ==
Local football in Nigeria has witnessed little support recently, with few supporters following local competitions like the Nigeria Premier Football League, Nigeria National League, Nigeria Federation Cup as well as African club competitions like the CAF Champions League and CAF Confederation Cup. Many football supporters in Nigeria rather prefer European leagues which have led to decreased interest in local football competitions and less popularity of these competitions.

The Nigeria Premier Football League, having been known by several names is the top flight professional football league in Nigeria, it was formed shortly after the Civil War with Mighty Jets winning its first edition in 1972. During the 1980s and 1990s, notable clubs like Enugu Rangers, Stationery Stores, Shooting Stars (known as IICC Ibadan), Julius Berger participated in the Nigerian League. These clubs won several national and international trophies and produced majority of the national team players who won the 1980 and 1994 Africa Cup of Nations.

Enyimba formed in the 1990s, became a reckoning force in Nigeria football during the early 21st century, winning the CAF Champions League in 2002 and 2003. They are the most successful Nigerian football club.

The Nigeria Federation Cup (formerly known as the Challenge Cup) is the oldest tournament in Nigeria, involving clubs from the 37 states in Nigeria with the winner qualifying for the CAF Confederation Cup, Mighty Jets has a record of appearing in 10 finals, 7 consecutively, without winning.

== Women's football ==
The Nigerian women's national team is one of the most successful in Africa, having won 12 out of 15 championships from 1991 to 2024 in the Women's Africa Cup of Nations. They are the only African nation to have competed in all nine Women’s World Cups, and the only African nation to reach the quarter finals.

Despite their successes, the women's team continues to push for equal treatment with men. This dates all the way back to colonial times when Britain was in control. Prior to British rule, Nigeria was a society where the roles of men and women were not strict. However, this changed when the British arrived and brought their own set of beliefs, causing labor to be divided based on gender.

It was not until the 1930s where women were first recorded playing the sport. The British people did not like the idea of women playing football, and in 1950 they stated that they didn’t want women playing on any ground. These women did not give up despite this setback and kept on pursuing football. Clubs began to form by the 1970s, and the Youth Sports of Federation of Nigeria created a national competition in the 1980s. All of this leads up to the success of the national team today.

Although achieving great success throughout the years, there are still issues with the treatment that Nigerian women are given, one of those being unequal pay. In 2019, the captain of the national team, Desire Oparanozie, publicly spoke out about this problem, which resulted in her being removed as captain and left out of the squad.Countless protests and boycotts have happened since then.

Ever since its inception, the women's national team (the Super Falcons) remain a dominant force in the African continent. They have qualified for every FIFA Women's World Cup and won the first seven CAF Women's Championships before having their run end in 2008 against Equatorial Guinea. Great players for the Falcons include Mercy Akide, Maureen Mmadu and Perpetua Nkwocha.

The under-20 and under-17 consistently qualify for the under-20 World Cup and under-17 World Cup but however have been less successful. The former finished finalists in 2010 and 2014.

The NWFL Premiership is the local football league and one of the oldest and strongest women's football league in Africa. The league has produced most of the national teams players (U17, U20 and senior teams).

== Football stadiums in Nigeria ==
Football stadiums with a capacity of 30,000 or higher are included.

#	Stadium	Capacity	Commissioned	City	State	Tenants	Ref	Images
1	Moshood Abiola National Stadium	60,491	2003	Abuja	FCT	Nigeria national football team		
2	Jos International Stadium	60,000		Jos	Plateau			
3	Lagos National Stadium	45,000	1972	Lagos	Lagos	Nigeria national football team		
4	Adokiye Amiesimaka Stadium	38,000	2015	Port Harcourt	Rivers			
5	Muhammadu Dikko Stadium	35,000	2013	Katsina	Katsina	Katsina United F.C.		
6	Godswill Akpabio International Stadium	30,000	2014	Uyo	Akwa Ibom	Akwa United		

== Support ==
Football is the most popular sport in Nigeria, and most people in Nigeria watch international football and support a club in a domestic league.

A 2024 poll conducted by NOI Polls found that 67% of Nigerians watch football, and 86% of Nigerians watched Nigeria at the 2023 Africa Cup of Nations, where Nigeria lost 2–1 to hosts Ivory Coast in the Final. By far the most popular league in Nigeria is the English Premier League, which is followed by 59% of Nigerians, while the local Nigerian Premier League is followed by 34% of Nigerians. The same poll found that 28% of Nigerians listed Chelsea as their favourite football club, followed by Manchester United (23%) and Arsenal (21%). The poll found that Chelsea was the most popular club in every geopolitical zone except for North East (where Arsenal are the most popular club) and North West (where Manchester United are the most popular club).

=== Most supported clubs ===
==== English Premier League ====
Twitter research (BBC, 2015)
Club	%
Arsenal	26%
Chelsea	25%
Manchester United	18%

NOI Polls, 2024
Club	%
Arsenal	21%
Chelsea	28%
Liverpool	6%
Manchester City	7%
Manchester United	23%
Tottenham Hotspur	1%

==== Nigerian Premier League ====
NOI Polls, 2024
Club	%
Akwa United	2%
Enugu Rangers	8%
Enyimba	14%
Gombe United	2%
Kano Pillars	27%
Katsina United	2%
Lobi Stars	3%
Plateau United	3%
Shooting Stars	2%
Warri Wolves	2%
Wikki Tourists	2%
Others	15%
None	18%

== Attendances ==
The average attendance per top-flight football league season and the club with the highest average attendance:

Season	League average	Best club	Best club average
2024-25	2,685	Enugu Rangers	11,684
2023-24	2,867	Enugu Rangers	20,672
2017	2,721	Enugu Rangers	14,651

Sources: League pages on Wikipedia

== See also ==
- Nigeria national football team
- Nigeria women's national football team
- List of football clubs in Nigeria by major honours won
- Nigeria Football Association
- Nigerian Premier League
- Women's football in Nigeria
- List of football stadiums in Nigeria

== Bibliography ==
- Boer, Wiebe (2018). The History of Football in Nigeria. City: Bookcraft. ISBN 978-9788457961.
