= Morice Chukwu =

Nigerian footballer

Personal information
- Full name: Morice Ugochukwu Chukwu
- Date of birth: 27 July 2002 (age 24)
- Place of birth: Ebonyi State, Nigeria
- Height: 1.81 m (5 ft 11 1/2 in)
- Positions: Defensive midfielder; attacking midfielder

Team information
- Current team: Jwaya

Youth career
- 2017: Bussdor United F.C.

Senior career*
Years	Team	Apps	(Gls)
2018–2019	Go Round F.C.	22	(5)
2019–2021	Akwa United	27	(7)
2022–2023	Rivers United	24	(9)
2023–2024	Singida Fountain Gate F.C.	16	(5)
2024	Ihefu F.C.	5	(1)
2024-2026	Singida Fountain Gate F.C.	24	(2)
2026–	Jwaya	0	(0)
- * Club domestic league appearances and goals as of 26 January 2021

Morice Ugochukwu Chukwu (born 27 July 2002) is a Nigerian professional footballer who plays as a defensive midfielder for Lebanese Premier League club Jwaya.

== Career ==
Chukwu began his career with Nigeria Amateur League Division Two side Bussdor United F.C.

=== Go Round FC ===
He later joined Go Round F.C. who signed him on a two-year contract on October 1, 2018.

=== Akwa United ===
On October 28, 2019, ahead of the 2019–2020 Nigerian Professional Football League season, he signed a two-year contract with Nigerian Professional Football League club Akwa United.

=== Rivers United ===
In April 2021, Rivers United FC announced the arrival of Chukwu from Akwa United on a two-and-a-half-year contract, the club where he made a total of 86 appearances, scored 6 goals and won his first Nigeria professional football league title.
