= Women's football in Nigeria =

- Country: Nigeria
- Governing body: Nigeria Football Federation
- National team: Women's national team

National competitions
- Africa Women Cup of Nations; FIFA Women's World Cup; Olympics

Club competitions
- Leagues: NWFL Premiership NWFL Championship NWFL Nationwide Leagues; Cup: Federation Cup

International competitions
- CAF Women's Champions League

Women's football in Nigeria has been increasing in popularity for many years. The Nigerian Women Football League is funded by the government to improve the Nigeria women's national football team. Many females in Nigeria face prejudice for playing the sport especially in the Northern part of the country due to cultural barriers.

The national team is the most successful women's football team in Nigeria and Africa, having won a total of 10 Women's Africa Cup of Nations title. They have produced players like Mercy Akide, Perpetua Nkwocha, Asisat Oshoala and Rasheedat Ajibade.

== History ==
The first known mention of women's football in Nigeria is 1937 "Subsequent reports immediately following 1937 involved women playing football but those games were for amusement. These were known as novelty games involving young ladies playing against middle aged men that were not considered athletically fit." The first reported game of two women teams against each other was 1944 Warri Ladies and Onitsha Ladies. At 1950 the British colonists threatened the national football association to forbid women's football. After becoming political independent numerous Nigerian cities hosted women's football teams by 1960. Multiple efforts were made in the 1960s to start women's football clubs in South Africa, but they proved fleeting. The 1970s saw some growth, with new women's leagues in Nigeria and an expansion of women's football into Western African countries, including Senegal. In 1978 Christopher Akintunde Abisuga created a club called Sugar Babes. This club was an all-female club and one of the first all-women teams. This team had much support through sponsorships and inspired players however they only lasted a few years. One local club in Dakar played a match against an Italian club in 1974; five years later, an early match between African nations was played by the Dakar side and a team from Guinea.

== Domestic football ==
The Nigeria Football Federation is in charge of the domestic football in the country and the national team. NWFL Premiership is the domestic professional league and is considered the strongest league in Africa.

== National team ==
Despite a lack of support from Nigerian officials, 28 clubs played women's football in the country by 1989, and Nigeria's national team competed in the 1991 Women's World Cup. This was made possible because of a major women's tournament privately funded by a wealthy entrepreneur. The tournament had the approval of the Nigerian FA and eventually led to the formation of the first women's national team. More women began playing football in the 1990s, in countries like Nigeria and South Africa. In 1998, CAF introduced an official African Women's Championship, following two unofficial versions of the tournament earlier in the 1990s; host country Nigeria won, beginning a stretch of five consecutive titles in the event. The next year, the squad reached the quarterfinals of the 1999 Women's World Cup. The Nigerian women's national team has won eleven Africa Cup of Nations titles, most recently in 2018. They are also the only team that has reached the quarter-finals at the football event at the Olympics and the FIFA Women's World Cup. As of 2020, the Nigerian women's national team is ranked 38th according to FIFA's world ranking chart. Mercy Akide, a striker who played on the 1999 women's national team, is considered the most famous name in African women's football. Her spectacular playing in the 1999 Women's World Cup won her a college scholarship to a school in Tennessee. She is considered to be a symbol of Nigerian women's success in football and to have put African soccer on the global map.

The under-20 and under-17 consistently qualify for the under-20 World Cup and under-17 World Cup but however have been less successful. The former finished finalists in 2010 and 2014.

== See also ==
- Football in Nigeria
- Nigeria women's national football team
- Bans of women's association football
