= Daniel Itodo =

Nigerian footballer

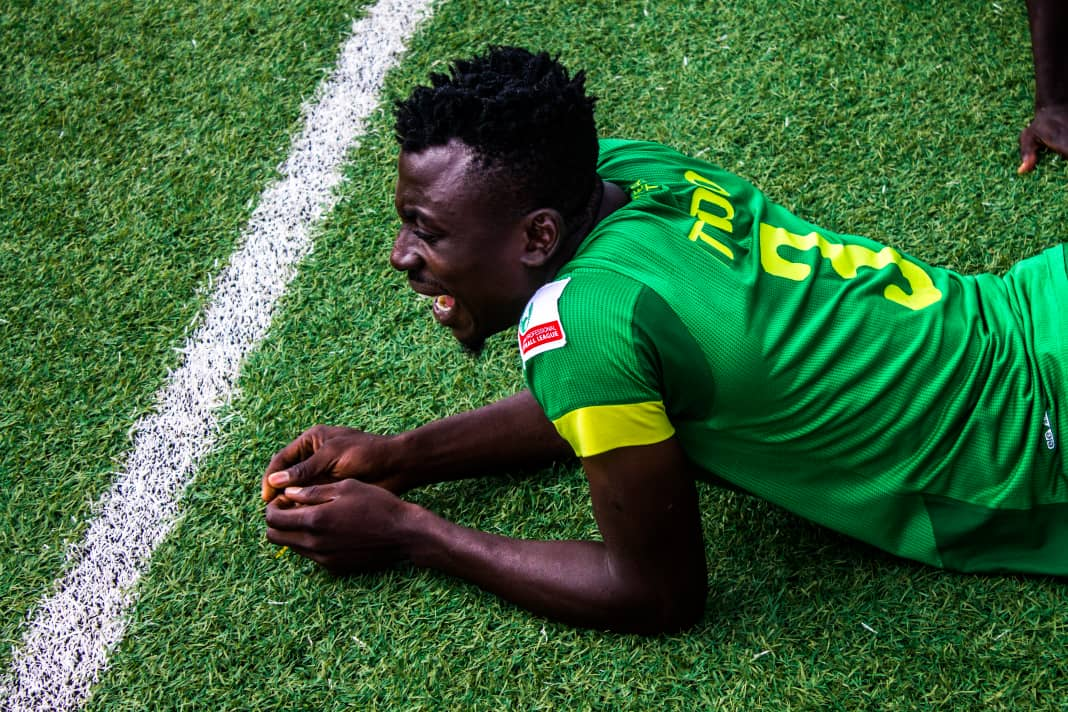

Personal information
- Full name: Daniel James Itodo
- Date of birth: 14 December 1996 (age 29)
- Place of birth: Makurdi, Nigeria
- Height: 1.71 m (5 ft 7 in)
- Position: Left back

Team information
- Current team: Enugu Rangers

Youth career
- Celtic
- DSS

Senior career*
Years	Team	Apps	(Gls)
2013–2025	Plateau United	215	(2)
2025–	Enugu Rangers		

International career^{‡}
2018–2019	Nigeria	4	(0)
- * Club domestic league appearances and goals as of 17:50, 26 May 2026 (UTC) ‡ National team caps and goals as of 17:50, 26 May 2026 (UTC)

Daniel James Itodo (born 14 December 1996) is a Nigerian international footballer who plays for Enugu Rangers, as a left back.

== Career ==
Born in Makurdi, Itodo has played club football for Celtic, DSS, Plateau United and Enugu Rangers.

He made his international debut for Nigeria in 2018.

== Playing style ==
Itodo is known for his long throws.
