= SGFC =

SGFC may refer to:

- Shijiazhuang Gongfu F.C., a Chinese football club based in Shijiazhuang
- SGFC Athletics Sport Club, a Nigerian football club based in Ilorin
- SGFC Eagles Maryland, an American soccer club based in Maryland
