= Luba Football Club =

LUBA FOOTBALL CLUB OR LUBA FC
- Nickname: The Yellow Army
- Founded: 21 November 2024
- Chairman: Afolabi Damilola Solomon
- Technical Director: Richard Okwashi Rico

Luba Football Club, commonly known as Luba FC, is a Nigerian association football club based in Lagos. Founded on 21 November 2024, the club competes in the Nigeria Nationwide League. The club is sometimes referred to by its nickname, the Yellow Army.

== History ==
Luba FC was established on 21 November 2024 as a developmental football club focused on identifying and nurturing young talent. The club was created to provide a structured pathway for players seeking progression into professional football.

Since its formation, Luba FC has operated a youth-oriented model that combines academy training with participation in organised competitions. The club is led by its proprietor and chairman, Afolabi Damilola Solomon.

== Coaching staff ==
| Position | Name |
|---|---|
| Goalkeeper Trainer | Wanofi Omoniyi Joseph |

== Competitive record ==
In its debut season, Luba FC competed in the Nigeria Nationwide League featuring in the Southern Zone at Maracana Centre A. The club faced teams including Obosa FA and F8 Ballers.

Luba FC also participated in the Dare to Dream Championship, where it reached the semi-finals.

The team will take on Sporting Lagos in the round 36 of the Lagos FA Cup for the 2026 Calendar year.

Luba competed in the 2026 NLO 1 league with their best outing coming against Gbagada FC in the competition

Luba FC played a total of six games in the 2026 NLO. In its first match, it lost three goals to two against Lions Heart. It also lost to Mavlon by two goals to one in its second game before securing its first point against Gbagada FC. Against Collins Edwin Sports Club, it suffered a 4-0 defeat and went on to record a 2-1 loss to Dannaz FC before securing its first win in the cometition against Spartan FC.

== Ownership and management ==
Luba FC is owned and chaired by Afolabi Damilola Solomon. The club's management has outlined plans centred on youth development and competitive growth within Nigerian football.

On 20 June, the club announced the appointment of Richard Okwashi ''Rico'' as Technical Director of the football club

== See also ==
Nigeria Nationwide League

Sporting Lagos
