= Uche Kalu =

Nigerian footballer

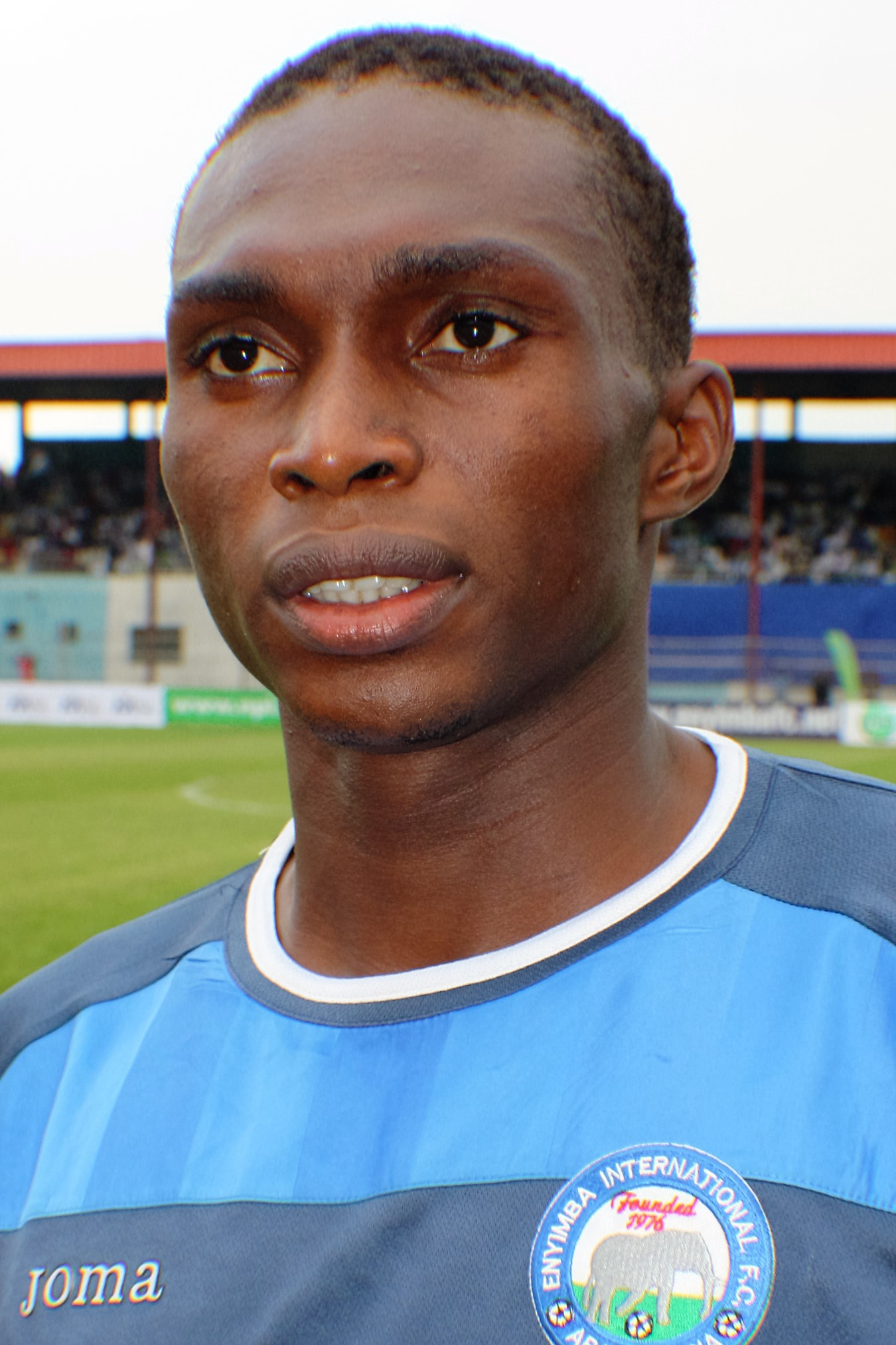

Personal information
- Full name: Uche Kalu
- Date of birth: 16 May 1986 (age 40)
- Place of birth: Aba, Nigeria
- Height: 1.88 m (6 ft 2 in)
- Position: Forward

Youth career
- Bussdor United

Senior career*
Years	Team	Apps	(Gls)
2006–2007	Bussdor United	10	(7)
2007–2013	Enyimba	9	(4)
2012–2013	→ Çaykur Rizespor (loan)	12	(9)
2013–2014	Çaykur Rizespor	8	(0)
2014	→ Adanaspor (loan)	14	(2)
2015–2016	Tobol	22	(5)
2016	Adanaspor	14	(5)
2016–2017	Gaziantep BB	28	(6)
2018	Adanaspor	11	(3)
2018–2019	Al-Markhiya		
2019	Altyn Asyr		

International career
2012	Nigeria	7	(1)
- * Club domestic league appearances and goals

Uche Kalu (born 16 May 1986) is a Nigerian former football player.

He is not related to former Enyimba teammate Henry Uche nor fellow Nigeria international and India-based midfielder Kalu Uche.

== Career ==
In 2007, he was named as "Most Valuable Player" in the Nigerian Premier League after joining Enyimba from second-level team Bussdor United F.C. He however struggled with injuries the next few years. After a failed transfer attempt to Botola team Wydad Casablanca in February 2012, he rejoined Enyimba.

He moved to Turkish second-tier team Çaykur Rizespor in August 2012, and had a goal and assist in his debut.

In January 2014, Uche Kalu joined Adanaspor on a loan deal.

In January 2015, Kalu went on trial with Kazakhstan Premier League side FC Tobol, signing a year-long contract with the club on 6 February 2015.

Kalu returned to Adanaspor in January 2016, signing a one-and-a-half-year contract.

On 24 April 2016, Adanaspor guaranteed to play in the first tier of Turkish football after 12 years.

In August 2019, Niger Uche Kalu and Kenya Peter Opiyo signed a contract with FC Altyn Asyr from Turkmenistan. This is the first foreign footballer in the history of the club and the first legionnaire in the 2019 Ýokary Liga season.

== International career ==
He was a member of the Nigeria B team that won the 2010 WAFU Nations Cup. His regained form saw him called up by Nigeria coach Stephen Keshi in 2012. He made his senior debut in the Eagles' 0-0 tie against Angola in January 2012. He scored his first goal in a friendly later that year against Egypt.
