= Anioma Sporting FC =

- Full name: Anioma Sporting Football Club
- Nickname: Flagship of the River Niger
- Founded: 2020
- Ground: Stephen Keshi Stadium, Asaba (announced)
- Capacity: 22,000 (approx.)
- Owner: Qriss-Henry Ogwu
- Website: https://aniomafc.com/

Anioma Sporting FC (also Anioma FC or Anioma Sporting) is a Nigerian association football club and development academy based in the Anioma region of Delta State. Established in 2020, the club positions itself as a pathway project combining grassroots development, community engagement, and global visibility for Nigerian players.

== History ==
The idea for Anioma Sporting emerged in 2020 under the leadership of Nigerian tech and automotive entrepreneur Qriss-Henry Ogwu. In September 2025, the club publicly announced its official launch with a stated mission to identify, develop, and showcase footballers from Delta North and across Nigeria. At launch, the club adopted blue and gold as its colours and the sobriquet "Flagship of the River Niger".

== Vision and mission ==
Anioma Sporting describes its vision as bridging the gap between raw talent and opportunity through:

- Grassroots and academy development (U10 to senior levels) with modern coaching and educational support;
- Exposure and placement via performance analytics and video-based player profiles;
- Community engagement through tournaments and outreach within Delta State;
- Adoption of professional standards in player care, conditioning, and coaching;
- Building partnerships domestically and internationally to create onward opportunities for players.

== Academy and player pathways ==
The club’s academy model centres on open trials and "combine" events in Delta North, age-group squads (U10–U19), and a development pipeline intended to prepare players for the senior game. The approach includes mentorship, conditioning, and showcasing players to scouts and clubs using match video and data profiles.

== Stadium and facilities ==
In 2025, the club announced plans to use the Stephen Keshi Stadium in Asaba as its official match and training facility as part of its long-term player development and community programmes. Anioma Sporting FC has also publicly indicated the stadium as a possible home ground in the near future.

== Identity ==
- Colours: blue and gold.
- Motto/nickname: "Flagship of the River Niger".

== Ownership and leadership ==
The project is credited to founder and principal Henry Ogwu. Further details of the board, management, and technical staff were not publicly disclosed at the time of launch in 2025.

== Challenges and prospects ==
Analysts and local coverage have noted typical challenges for new Nigerian clubs, including infrastructure, financing, and competition for talent and visibility. Proponents argue that the emphasis on technology, community engagement, and international pathways could provide a replicable model for regional academies if sustained over time.

== See also ==
- Nigeria Football Federation
- Youth football in Nigeria
- Stephen Keshi Stadium
- List of football clubs in Nigeria
