= Amaju Pinnick =

Nigerian football administrator (born 1970)

First Vice President of the Confederation of African Football
- In office September 2018 – July 2019
- Preceded by: Kwesi Nyantakyi
- Succeeded by: Constant Omari

President of the Nigeria Football Federation
- In office October 2014 – October 2022
- Preceded by: Aminu Maigari
- Succeeded by: Ibrahim M. Gusau

Chair of Delta State Football Association
- In office 2010–2014

Personal details
- Born: Amaju Melvin Pinnick; 1 December 1970 (age 55) Mid-Western Region, Nigeria (now Delta State, Nigeria)
- Education: University of Benin
- Occupation: Football administrator businessman
- Website: amajumelvinpinnick.com

Amaju Melvin Pinnick (born 1 December 1970) is a Nigerian football administrator, who was president of the Nigeria Football Federation (NFF) from 2014 to 2022. He was elected NFF president in September 2014 and reelected on 20 September 2018. He was also First Vice President of the Confederation of African Football (CAF) from September 2018 to July 2019, and a member of the Organising Committee for FIFA competitions.

== Career ==
=== Nigeria Football Federation ===
Pinnick started his career as the chair of the Delta Sports Commission in 2010. Subsequently, he was appointed chair of Delta State Football Association in 2011. On 30 September 2014 he was elected President of the Nigeria Football Federation. On 20 September 2018, he was re-elected for another four-year term in office in the NFF Elective Congress held in Katsina. His administration has seen the successful passage of the Nigeria Football Federation Bill through the National Assembly of Nigeria currently awaiting passage into Law by the President Muhammadu Buhari's assent. Remo Star FC player's death tragedy to football family, says Pinnick NFF set to restructure secretariat, allays fears over coronavirus NFF restates commitment to partners, renews pact with Simba Gernot Rohr must accept salary in naira, stay in Nigeria, says NFF NFF mourns executive member, Chidi Okenwa Football Brownhill Foundation gives palliatives to communities amid lockdown NFF reposes confidence in Rohr, explains delayed deal Pinnick explains NFF's decision to stick with Rohr NFF president promises more support for Super Falcons Pinnick restates commitment to football development, reaffirms decision to stand down No going back on programmes to develop Nigerian leagues, says Pinnick

=== FIFA, CAF, and AFCON ===
On 19 January 2017 Amaju Pinnick was appointed member of the organizing committee for FIFA competitions. He was also elected into the Confederation of African Football (CAF) Executive Committee on 16 March 2017. Subsequently, on 8 May 2017 he was appointed President of AFCON. He became the First Vice President of the Confederation of African Football as well in September 2018, replacing Kwesi Nyantakyi. On 19 July 2019, CAF President Ahmad Ahmad decided not to re-nominate Pinnick for as the First Vice President role, which is due for election every two years, citing differences in focus and direction for CAF. Pinnick accepted the decision and Constant Omari replaced him as successor. He was the 2016 The Sun (Nigeria) Newspapers Sports Personality of Year Award winner, and also in 2018 which he shared the award with Nigeria national football team Head Coach, Gernot Rohr.

FIFA Council Membership

On 12 March 2021, Amaju Pinnick secured a seat in the FIFA Council the highest decision-making organ in world football following a victory against Malawian FA president Walter Nyamilandu, who was the incumbent by 43 votes to 8 during the CAF General Assembly held in Rabat, Morocco.

He is the third Nigerian elected into the council after Oyo Orok Oyo (1980-1988) and Amos Adamu (2006-2010). Amaju Pinnick had earlier dropped his ambition to run for the Confederation of Africa Football (CAF) Presidency after throwing his weight behind South Africa billionaire, Patrice Motsepe.

=== Court sack ===
On 8 April 2016 a Federal High Court in Plateau State invalidated the 2014 NFF Presidential election this was as a result of a petition by his opponent Chris Giwa. After the court ruling, Chris Giwa was announced legitimate winner of the election but on 11 April 2016 FIFA wrote NFF stating that the court was interfering with matters of the Nigeria Football Federation and that if the ruling was not overturned Nigeria would face FIFA ban. In July 2016, then President Goodluck Jonathan appealed to Chris Giwa to withdraw the case, announcing Amaju Pinnick the President of the NFF.

== Fraud allegations ==
On 5 January 2019 publications were made by several news agencies alleging fraud in the NFF. Pinnick was also supposedly placed on a travel ban by the Department of State Security pending an investigation that was reportedly ordered by former President Muhammadu Buhari. On 6 January 2019, the Presidency of Nigeria made a press release stating that it had neither ordered the arrest or placed a travel ban on the NFF president.

=== $8.4 million fraud ===
On 2 May 2019 a Nigerian court ordered the NFF to provide the chargesheet for Amaju Pinnick in an alleged FIFA grant scandal. On 7 May 2019, the Special Presidential Investigation Panel for the Recovery of Public Property filed a 17- count charge against Pinnick, Seyi Akinwunmi, Shehu Dikko, Ahmed Yusuf and Mohammed Sanusi all officials of the NFF. Pinnick among three others were charged for allegedly misappropriating $8.4 million paid by Fédération Internationale de Football Association (FIFA) to NFF for appearance fee at the 2014 World Cup in Brazil. Pinnick is also charged with not declaring his assets according to the Code of Conduct Bureau Act. In Pinnick's defense, the NFF stated that their PricewaterhouseCoopers audited accounts were published publicly and FIFA has the exclusive rights and competence to investigate and judge the conduct of persons bound by their code of ethics as regards funds and that their petition against the allegation had been filed in the Federal High Court, Abuja.

== Personal life and education ==
Pinnick was born on 1 December 1970 into a polygamous family of nineteen children. Amaju Pinnick is married to Julie Pinnick and they have four children. Pinnick first attended Hussey College Warri where he obtained his West African School Certificate. In 1994, Pinnick obtained his BSc in Political science and Public administration from the University of Benin. He is a Business man and a nephew to Chief Joe and Late Pa Johnson O. S. Ayonmike through his mother, Madam Rebecca Pinnick (née Ayonmike).

=== Facial scars ===
Pinnick sustained facial injuries during a St. Valentine's Day party he hosted for couples in 2011 after a firework exploded in his face at his residence in Warri, Delta State. The domestic accident affected his cheekbones and eardrums which required 14 surgeries to fix in the intensive care unit of a hospital in Shell Nigeria Area, Ogunu, Warri, for 10 days.

== See also ==
- Ibrahim M. Gusau
