= Jordan Attah Kadiri =

Nigerian footballer (born 2000)

Jordan Kadiri
Personal information
- Full name: Jordan Attah Kadiri
- Date of birth: 11 March 2000 (age 26)
- Place of birth: Idah, Nigeria
- Height: 1.82 m (6 ft 0 in)
- Position: Forward

Youth career
- 2016–2018: Catholic Cadet
- 2017–2018: Sunsel

Senior career*
Years	Team	Apps	(Gls)
2018–2019	Sunsel	0	(0)
2019	→ Nasarawa United (loan)	2	(0)
2019–2020	Östersund	21	(5)
2020–2024	Lommel	38	(5)
2021	→ Strømsgodset (loan)	7	(1)
2022	→ Östersund (loan)	14	(1)
2023–2024	→ Francs Borains (loan)	19	(9)
2024–2025	UTA Arad	12	(2)
2025–2026	Dender EH	17	(1)
- * Club domestic league appearances and goals as of 9 May 2026

Jordan Attah Kadiri (born 11 March 2000) is a Nigerian professional footballer who plays as a forward.

== Club career ==
On 13 August 2019, after impressing on a week-long trial, Kadiri joined Allsvenskan side Östersund. He had previously played for Sunsel in the Nigerian lower leagues and had a loan spell with Nigeria Premier League side Nasarawa United.

On 25 August 2019, Kadiri made his professional debut for Östersund, coming on as a substitute in a 3–1 loss at home to AIK.

On 31 July 2020, Kadiri joined Belgian First Division B side Lommel on a four-year deal.

On 30 August 2021, Kadiri joined Norwegian club Strømsgodset on loan for the rest of the season. His loan was terminated after the season.

In February 2022, Kadiri rejoined his former club Östersund on a one-year loan deal. The deal was cut short in August 2022, however, due to Östersund suffering from financial difficulties.

Kadiri scored his first goal for Lommel in the 2022–23 season against RE Virton on 28 October 2022. He scored again against Beerschot on 6 November.

On 6 September 2023, Kadiri moved on a new loan to Challenger Pro League club Francs Borains. 3 days later, he scored on his Francs Borains debut in a Belgian Cup game against Tongeren.

On 13 February 2025, Kadiri returned to Belgium and signed a contract with Dender EH for one-and-a-half seasons, with an option to extend for one more year.

== Career statistics ==
=== Club ===
As of match played 18 December 2024

Appearances and goals by club, season and competition
Club	Season	League			Cup		Europe		Other		Total	
Club	Season	Division	Apps	Goals	Apps	Goals	Apps	Goals	Apps	Goals	Apps	Goals
Östersund	2019	Allsvenskan	10	3	0	0	—		—		10	3
Östersund	2020	Allsvenskan	11	2	3	4	—		—		14	6
Östersund	Total		21	5	3	4	—		—		24	9
Lommel	2020–21	Belgian First Division B	24	3	2	0	—		—		26	3
Lommel	2022–23	Challenger Pro League	14	2	1	0	—		—		15	2
Lommel	Total		38	5	3	0	—		—		41	5
Strømsgodset (loan)	2021	Eliteserien	7	1	1	3	—		—		8	4
Östersund (loan)	2022	Allsvenskan	14	1	0	0	—		—		14	1
Francs Borains (loan)	2023–24	Challenger Pro League	19	9	2	1	—		—		21	10
UTA Arad	2024–25	Liga I	12	2	2	0	—		—		14	2
Career total			111	23	11	8	0	0	0	0	122	31
