= Apa United F.C. =

Nigerian football club

Apa United is a Nigerian football club. They play in the Nigeria Amateur League Division Two.

Until 2012, they played in the second-tier division in the Nigeria National League and two years in the third tier Nigeria Nationwide League, until May 2015. They are located in Otukpo in the 1,000 capacity Otukpo Township Stadium. There are plans for a replacement stadium.
