= SGFC Athletics Sport Club =

Professional football Club in Ilorin, Kwara State, Nigeria

SGFC Athletics
- Full name: SGFC Athletics Sports Club
- Nickname: Eagles
- Founded: 2020; 6 years ago
- Ground: Kwara State Stadium
- Capacity: 26,000
- Manager: Olawale Olatoye
- Coach: Mashood Yakub
- League: Nigeria Nationwide League
- 2026: 2nd - Sagamu Center
- Website: http://www.sgfceagles.com/
Home colours	Away colours

SGFC Athletics Sports Club is a professional Nigerian football club based in Ilorin Nigeria. The club is currently playing at the 3rd highest level of Nigerian domestic football and participates in the Nigeria Nationwide League Division One the third tier of Nigerian football league.

== History ==
The club relocated from United States of America (USA) and was founded in February 2020 by Richard Opanuga in Nigeria. SGFC Athletics Sports Club gained promotion through an expansion slot acquisition to participate in the Nigeria Nationwide League One, that plays in the division three of the Nigeria Football League systems.

The Club participated in Evolution Cup 2022 pre-season held in Remo Stars Football Club stadium at Ikenne, Ogun state in preparation for commencement of the Nigeria Nationwide League One 2021/2022 season. SGFC Athletics Sports Club emerged the Champions of Evolution Cup tournament program in 2022 football season following NLO league activities.

SGFC Athletics Sports Club emerged winners of the 2025 edition of the annual Jagaban Cup championship. On March 27, 2025. SGFC Athletics Sports Club defeated 36 Lion FC in finals, through a thrilling shootout at 80th-minute goal by Chukwudi Okwuosah, to secure their first ever Jagaban Cup title. With this triumph, the club has been on major spotlight across the nation.

== Crest, shirts and mascot ==
SGFC Athletics' main kit colour is white and blue and the away kit is forest green. In addition, a Red and Blue stripe alternative kit is also used in some domestic matches. The club's current crest was introduced for the beginning of the 2021–22 season. The team's crest is round shaped in Blue, Green and Red with spangled yellow.

=== Kits manufacturer and sponsors ===
Consulting firm Txpoint USA was announced as the jersey sponsor in a one-year partnership on February 5, 2024 for 2024 football season. In June 2023, SGFC Athletics secured a partnership agreement with Danish sportswear manufacturer Select Sports International to sponsor football kits and sport equipment for 2023/2024 season.

Period	Kit supplier	Shirt sponsor (chest)
2023–2024	Select	Txpoint

== Year-by-year results ==
Year	League	Location	Result
2026	Nigeria Nationwide League 1	NLO1, Sagamu Center	2nd
2025	Jagaban Cup	National Stadium, Lagos state	Champion.
2025	Nigeria Nationwide League 1	NLO1, Sagamu Center	8th
2024	NLO Preseason Evolution Cup	Ikenne, Ogun state	5th, DNQ.
2023	Ciroma Cup	Ilorin, Kwara State	Champion.
2023	Nigeria Nationwide League 1	Division 1 Group C2B	1st.
2022	NLO Preseason Evolution Cup	Ikenne, Ogun state	Champion.
2022	Nigeria Nationwide League 1	NLO 1 Group C	3rd.

== Training facilities ==
The home ground of SGFC Athletics Sports Club is Kwara State Stadium in Ilorin and plays home league matches out of Ilorin Stadium Complex with a seating capacity of 26,000.

== Management ==
The Club personnel was named by the Club's management. The SGFC Athletics Sport Club's Personnel and Administration revealed

Position	Name	Country	Year
President	Richard Opanuga	United States	
Director of Academy Programs	Rotimi Omope	United States	
General Manager	Olawale Olatoye	Nigeria	
Media Director	Tosh Michaels	Nigeria	
Head Coach	Mashood Yakub	Nigeria	
Assistant Coach	Nehemiah Benjamin Adieze	Nigeria	
Coach	Jamiu Isa	Nigeria	2021-2022
Assistant Coach	Abiodun Balogun	Nigeria	2021-2022
Athletic Trainer	Olanike Olayori	Nigeria	
