= Ibrahim Galadima =

Former Nigerian sports administrators

- Born: June 14, 1951; Fagge, Kano State, Nigeria
- Died: April 18, 2026 (aged 74); Kano, Kano State, Nigeria
- Occupations: Sports administrator, public servant
- Known for: Chairman of the Nigeria Football Association (2002–2006)
- Title: Galadiman Fagge

Alhaji Ibrahim Galadima (14 June 1951 – 18 April 2026) was a Nigerian sports administrator, public servant, and traditional leader. He served as Chairman of the Nigeria Football Association (NFA) from 2002 to 2006 and held cabinet-level administrative positions in Kano State.

== Early life ==
Galadima was born on 14 June 1951 in Fagge, Kano State, Nigeria. He completed his education in Kano before entering public administration and sports governance in the late 1970s.

== Career ==
=== Sports administration ===
Galadima began his career in sports governance within Kano State during the late 1970s:

- Kano State Football Association: Served as Chairman from 1977 to 1979.
- Kano State Sports Council: Executive Chairman from 1981 to 1983, with a subsequent re-appointment in the late 1980s.
- National Sports Commission: Appointed to the Caretaker Committee of the National Sports Commission in 1984.
- Nigeria Olympic Committee: Served as First Vice President from 1985 to 1987.
- Kano Pillars F.C.: Played a foundational role in the 1990 establishment of Kano Pillars F.C. through the merger of local football clubs in Kano.
- International & Tournament Committees: Served on the Presidential Monitoring Committee for stadium infrastructure development ahead of the 1999 FIFA World Youth Championship hosted by Nigeria, as well as the Confederation of African Football (CAF) Youth Championship Organising Committee.
- Nigeria Football Association: Elected Chairman of the NFA in 2002, serving until 2006. His administration managed national team operations and grassroots football programs.

=== Public service ===
Outside sports governance, Galadima held cabinet-level commissioner portfolios in Kano State:

- Commissioner for Social Welfare, Youth, and Sports (appointed 1989).
- Commissioner for Works, Housing, and Transport.

In local administration, he held the traditional title of Galadiman Fagge, serving as the traditional community leader of Fagge in Kano State.

== Death ==
Galadima died in Kano on 18 April 2026 at the age of 74. Funeral prayers were conducted on 19 April 2026 at the Fagge Juma'at Mosque in Kano, followed by burial according to Islamic rites. President Bola Tinubu issued an official statement mourning his passage and commending his contributions to sports development in Nigeria.
