= Seyi Akinwunmi =

Nigeria football federation official

Former Vice President of Nigeria Football Federation
- Incumbent
- Assumed office 2014

Former Chairman of Lagos State Football Association
- In office 2011–2022

Seyi Akinwunmi was the first Vice President of the Nigeria Football Federation. He was appointed Vice President of the Nigeria Football Federation (NFF) in 2014, re-elected in 2018 but lost in the election to become the NFF president in 2022. He is Chairman of the Lagos State Football Association. In 2012, he served on the adhoc committee for restructuring the Nigeria National League.
