= Dalhatu United F.C. =

Nigerian football club

Dalhatu United
- Ground: Sardauna Memorial Stadium; Gusau, Nigeria
- Capacity: 5,000
- Chairman: Alhaji A.A. Master
- Manager: Abdulkadir Mu'azu
- League: Nigeria National League

Dalhatu United Football Club is a Nigerian football club based in Gusau, Zamfara State. They play in the second level of professional football in Nigeria, the Nigeria National League.

== Current Team ==
Note: Flags indicate national team as defined under FIFA eligibility rules; some limited exceptions apply. Players may hold more than one non-FIFA nationality.

| No. | Pos. | Nation | Player |
|---|---|---|---|
| — | GK | (Nigeria) NGA | Sadiq Abubakar |
| — | FW | (Nigeria) NGA | Isah Rilwan |
| — | | | Said Ahmed |

| No. | Pos. | Nation | Player |
|---|---|---|---|
| — | | (Nigeria) NGA | Emeka Nnaji |
| — | | (Nigeria) NGA | Usman Samaila |
| — | | (Nigeria) NGA | John James |
