= Ibrahim Musa Gusau =

Nigerian sports administrator (born 1964)

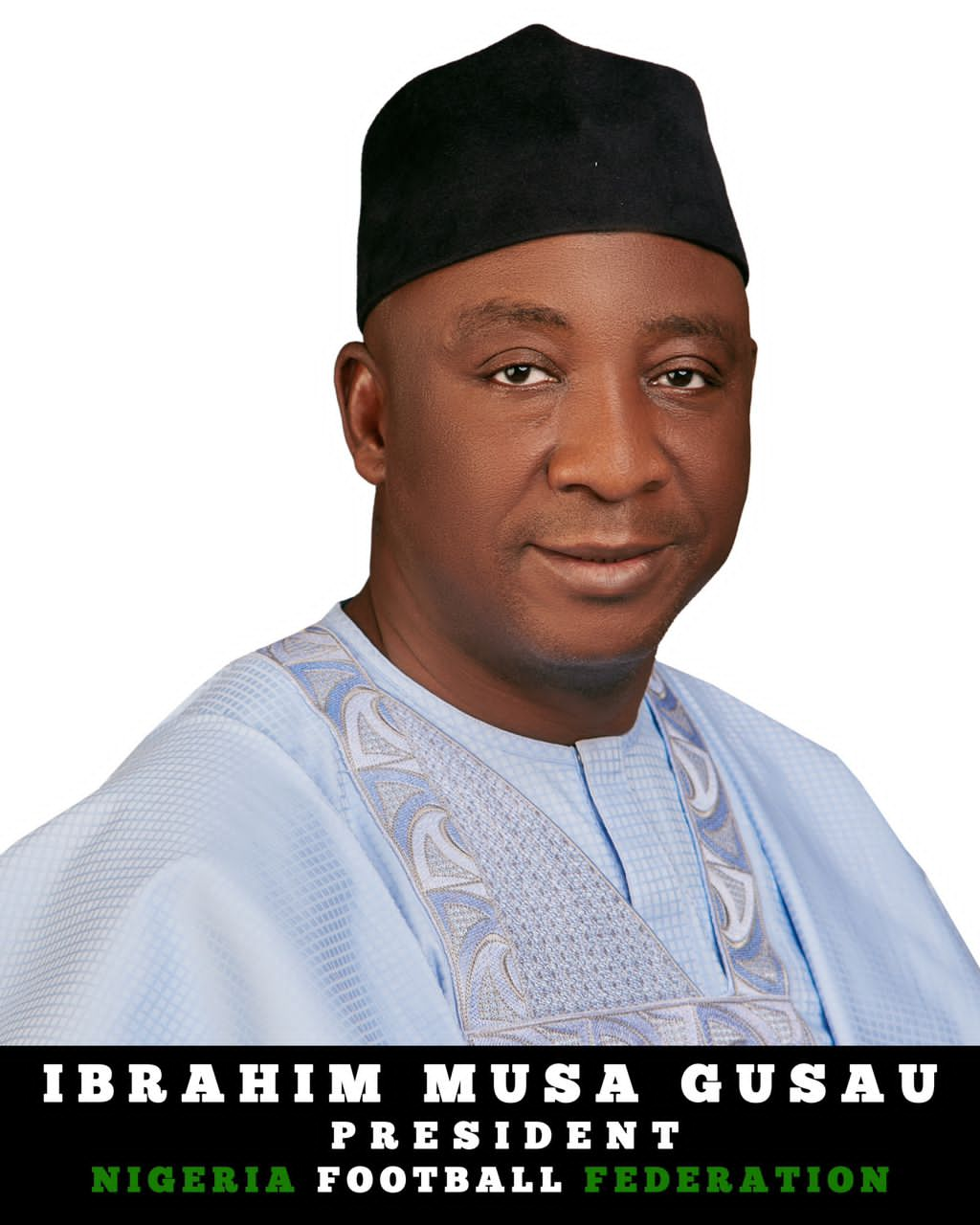
- Official portrait, 2022

President of the Nigeria Football Federation
- In office 11 October 2022 – 27 August 2026
- Preceded by: Amaju Pinnick
- Succeeded by: TBA

Personal details
- Born: Ibrahim Musa Gusau; 1 March 1964 (age 62) Zamfara State, Nigeria
- Children: 7
- Occupation: Football administrator; Accountant

Ibrahim Musa Gusau (born 1 March 1964) is a Nigerian sports administrator, who has served as president of the Nigeria Football Federation (NFF) since 2022. He is a former chairman of Zamfara Football Association, a committee member of the Confederation of African Football (CAF), and a member of CAF youth organising committee.

The 78th elective congress of the Nigeria Football Federation elected him as the 40th president of the federation and successor to Amaju Pinnick.

== Career ==
Gusau served as chairman of Zamfara State Football Association and has served as member of CAF of Organising Committee for the African Nations Championship.

On 30 September 2022, Gusau was elected president of the Nigerian Football Federation during the 78th NFF Annual General Assembly held in Benin City, Edo State.
