= Bussdor United F.C. =

Nigerian football club

Bussdor United
- Full name: Bussdor United Football Club
- Founded: 2001
- Ground: Dan Anyiam Stadium, Owerri
- Capacity: 20,000
- Chairman: Oscar Igbokwe
- Manager: Sam Obuh Jr.
- League: Nigeria Amateur League Division Two
Home colours	Away colours

Bussdor United is a Nigerian football club formerly based in Port Harcourt but now playing in Owerri. It is one of the few clubs in the country owned by a private entity and not a state government.

== History ==
The club was founded by Oscar Igbokwe, President of Bussdor Group of Companies, an oil and gas conglomerate.

The club rose from the amateur ranks to the professional first division in the first four years of their founding. However, their most "famous" moment was when they missed out on promotion to the Premier League in 2006. On August 12, the last day of the season, Akwa United F.C. beat Calabar Rovers 13–0 after scoring only 12 goals all season. Thus, Akwa won promotion over Bussdor by one goal. Bussdor filed an appeal to have the game investigated, but to no avail.

At the end of the 2010 season, they were relegated to the Nigeria Amateur League with a record of four wins, five ties and twenty-one losses, setting a new record in losses since the Professional League went to a two-division format.

== Current squad ==
Note: Flags indicate national team as defined under FIFA eligibility rules; some limited exceptions apply. Players may hold more than one non-FIFA nationality.

No.	Pos.	Nation	Player
12	FW	NGA	Fadaiya Nasiru
15	MF	NGA	Kingsley Okoronkwo
16	GK	NGA	Sunny Onyekwere
—	FW	NGA	Saad Folorunsho
