= Stephen Keshi Stadium =

Stadium in Asaba, Nigeria

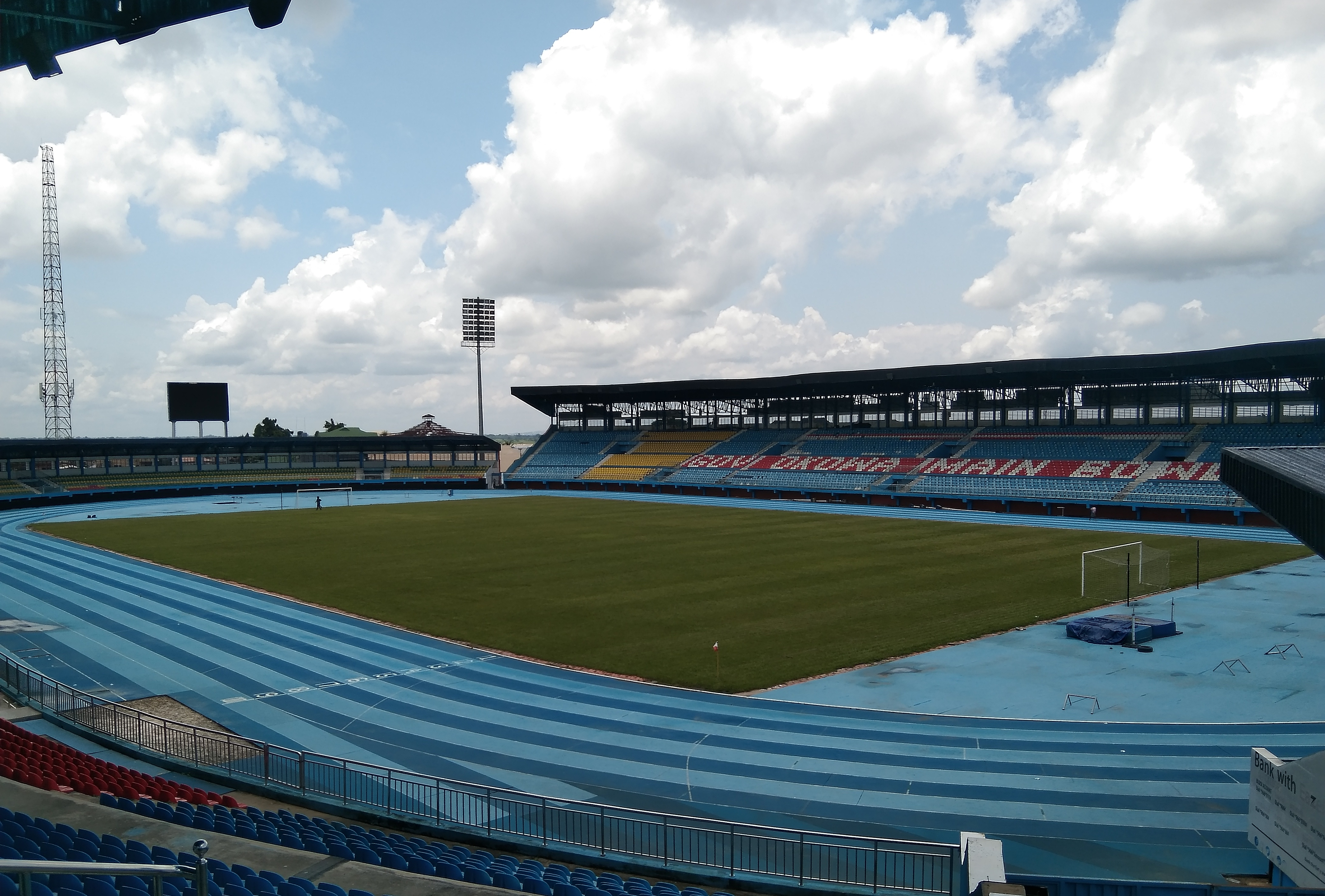
- Interactive map of Stephen Keshi Stadium
- Full name: Stephen Keshi Stadium, Asaba
- Former names: Asaba Township Stadium
- Location: Asaba, Delta State, Nigeria
- Coordinates: 6.20628°N 6.72244°E
- Owner: Delta State Government
- Capacity: 22,000
- Surface: Grass

The Stephen Keshi Stadium is a multi-purpose complex in Asaba, in Nigeria's Delta State.

The main venue at the complex is the Governor Okowa Main Bowl, the football and athletics stadium. It was formerly known as Asaba township stadium, and has been renamed after Nigerian footballer Stephen Keshi. The stadium hosted the 2018 African Championships in Athletics and has a capacity of 22,000 people, all covered. It was commissioned in 2018.

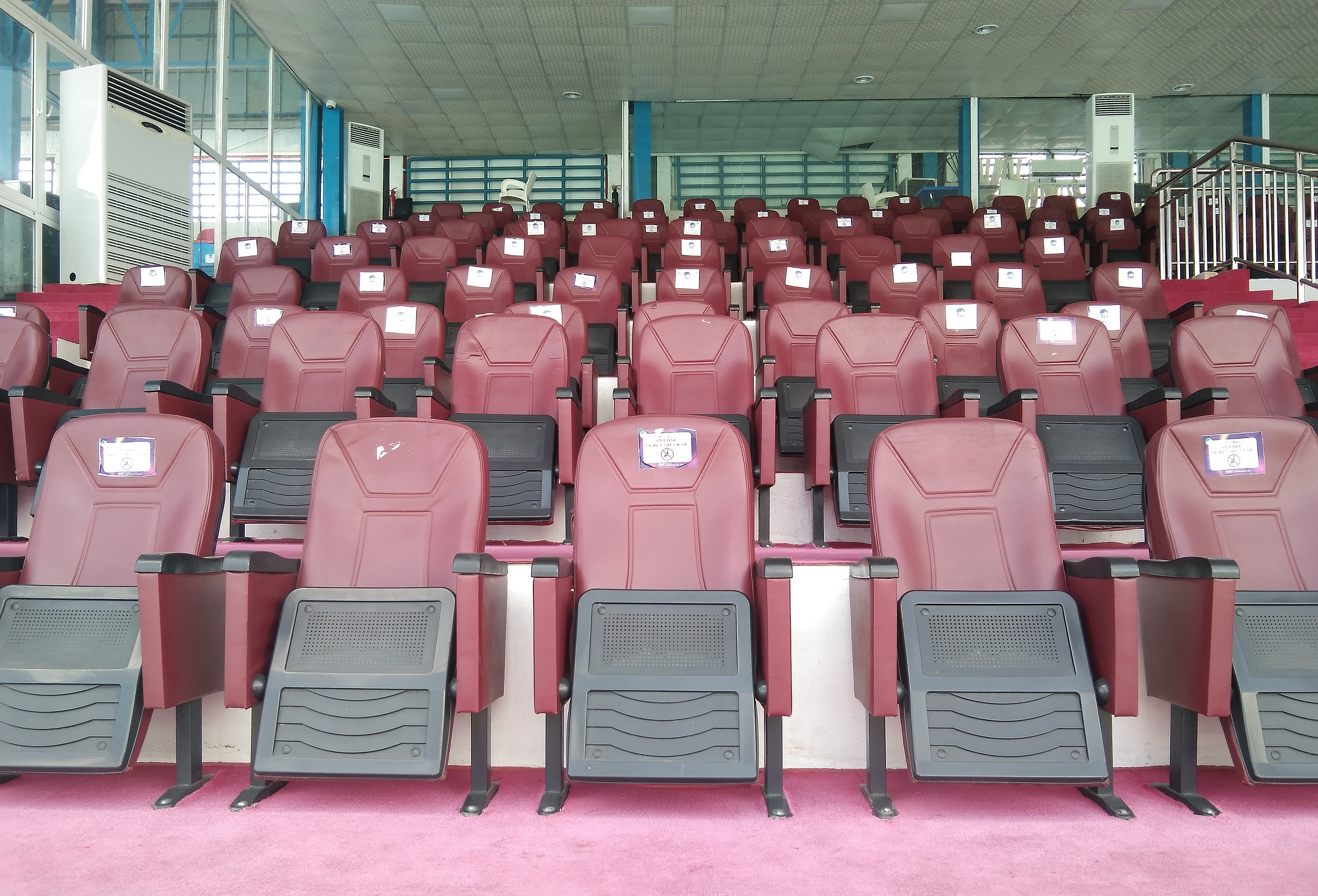
The executive space in Stephen Keshi Stadium Asaba

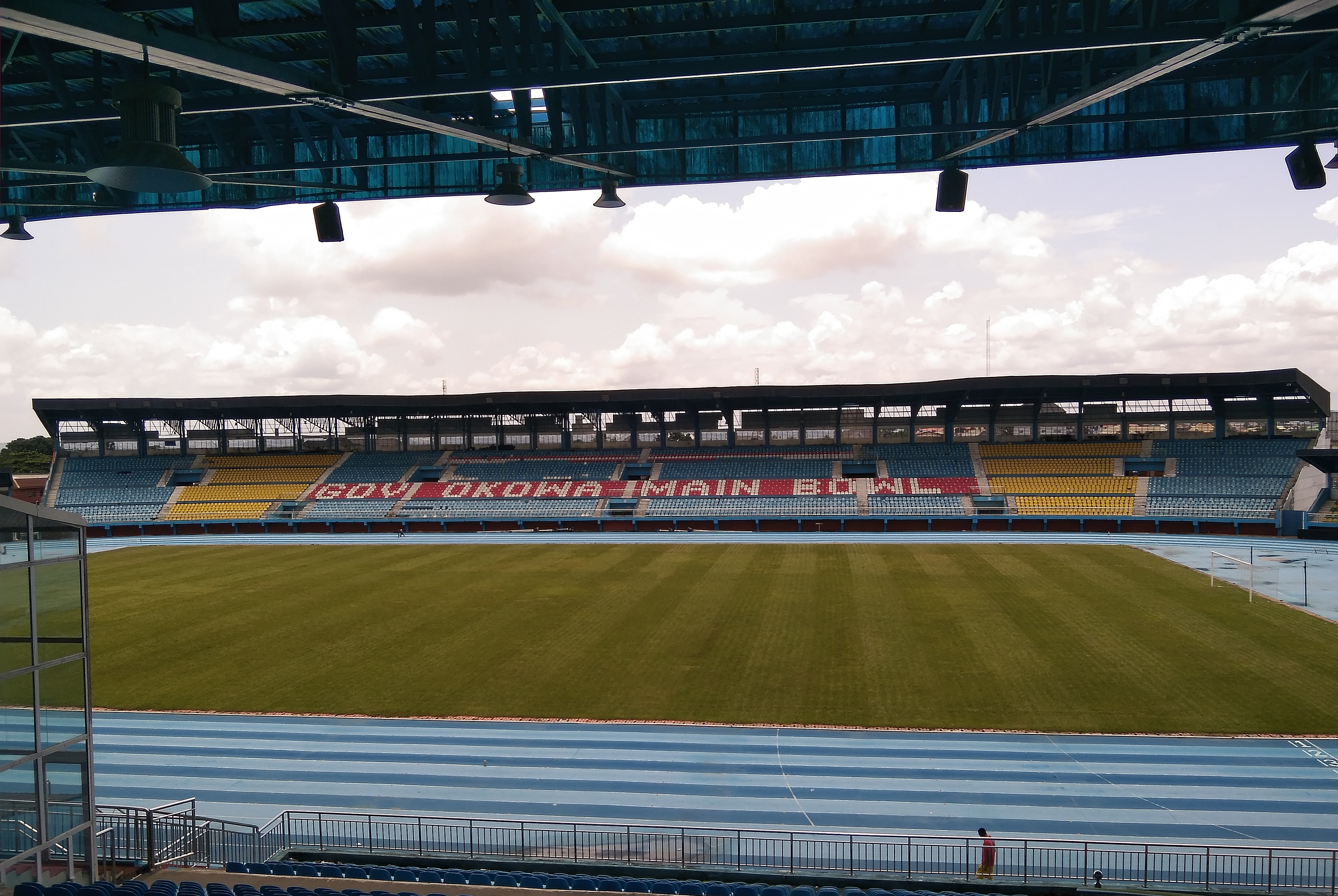
Gov Okowa Main Bowl

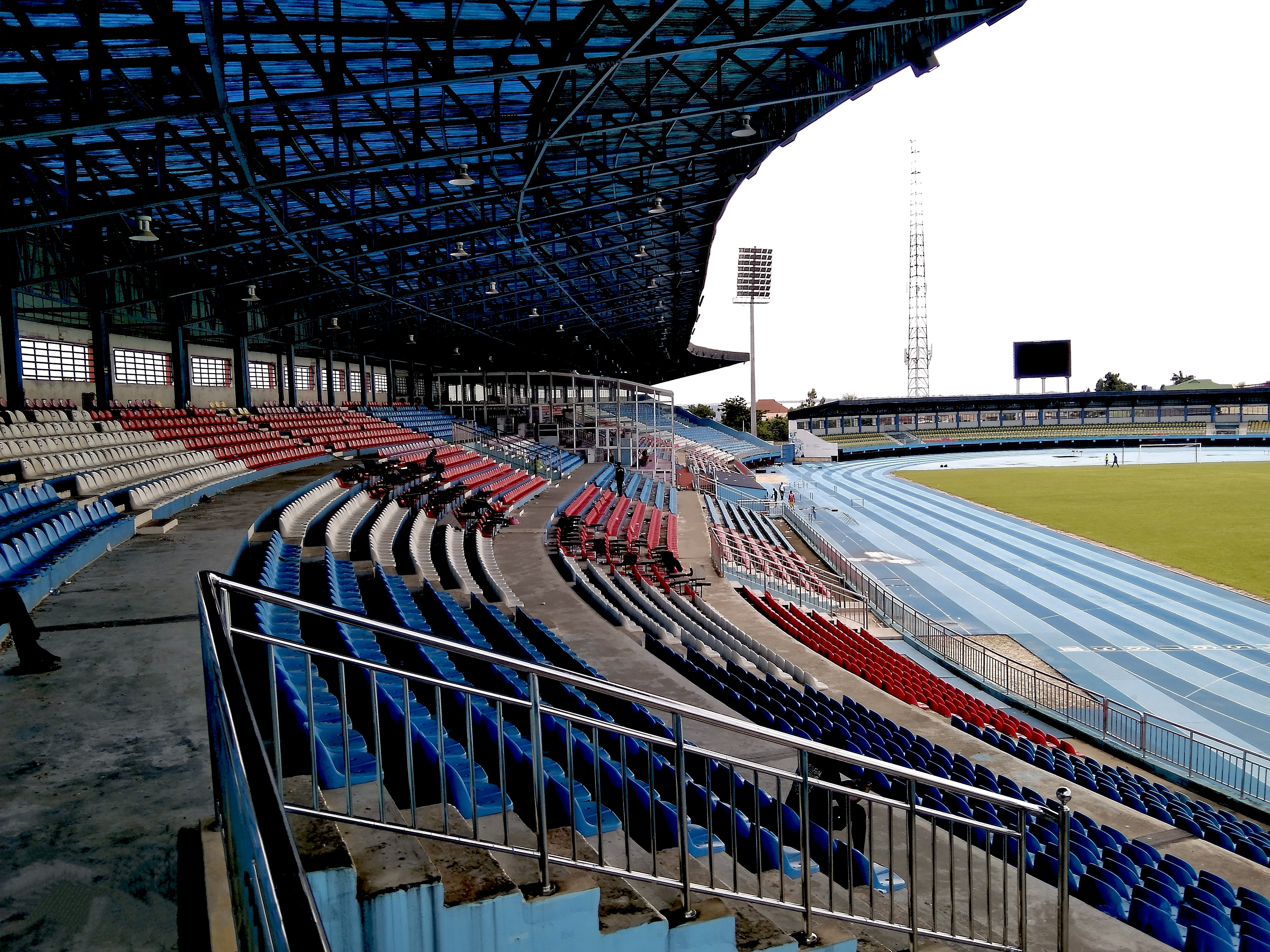
A section of Stephen Keshi Stadium Asaba

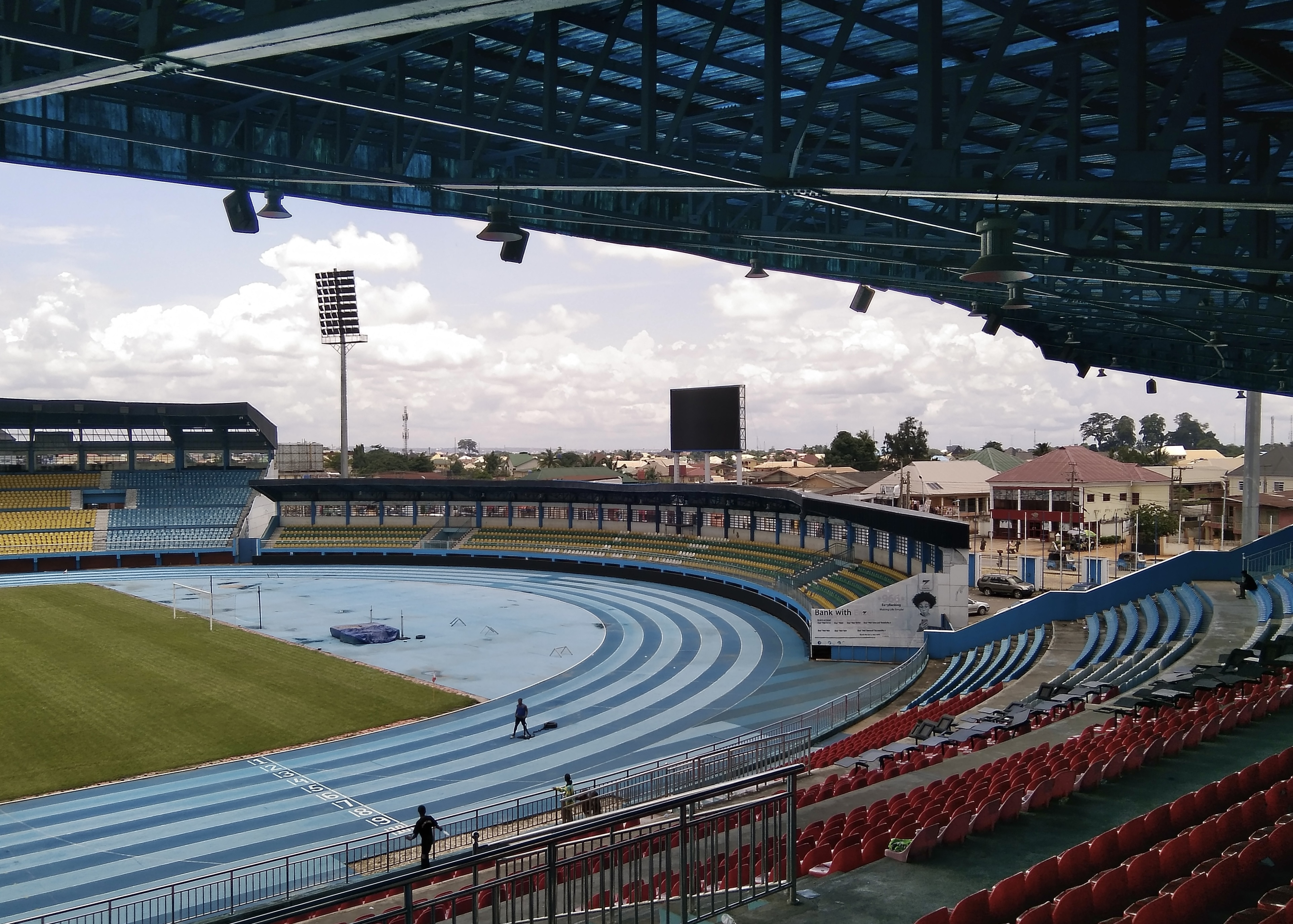
Part of Stephen Keshi Stadium Asaba

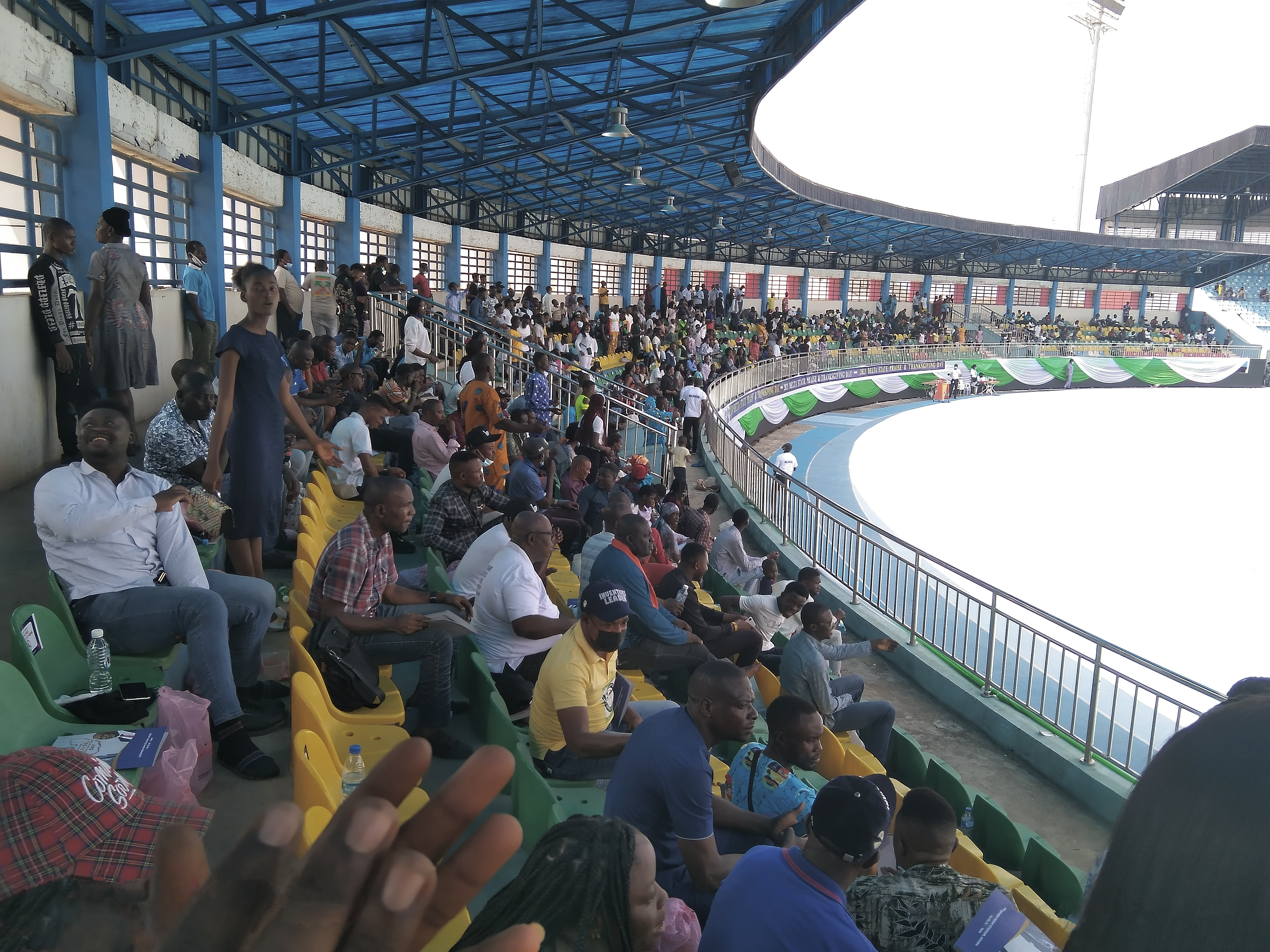
Stephen Keshi Stadium Asaba with viewers

== Major events ==
Stephen Keshi Stadium hosted the 21st 2018 African Championships in Athletics from 1 to 5 August 2018, serving as the main venue for over 800 athletes representing 52 African nations.

The stadium hosted its first international football match on 20 November 2018, a friendly between the Nigeria Super Eagles and the Uganda Cranes.

== Location ==
The Stephen Keshi Stadium is located in Asaba, Delta State, Nigeria, close to the River Niger Bridge and the city’s central business district. Its central position makes it accessible to both residents and visitors from across the region. The facility serves as a hub for athletics, football, and community events.

== History ==
Stephen Keshi Stadium was previously known as Asaba Township Stadium. It was renamed after Stephen Keshi, a popular Nigerian football star and manager who died in 2016.

In 2024, the stadium was given a face-lift in preparation for hosting the 8th National Youth Games.

== Use ==
In 2025, it was announced that Anioma Sporting FC is scheduled to use the Stephen Keshi Stadium as its official match facility. The move is part of the club’s long-term player development strategy, offering its academy and first-team players access to a professional-grade venue. It also aligns with Anioma Sporting’s community engagement programs, which aim to bring high-level football closer to fans in Delta State while fostering local participation in the sport.

== See also ==
- List of football stadiums in Nigeria
- Lists of stadiums
