= Ughelli Rovers F.C. =

Ughelli Rovers FC
- Full name: Ughelli Rovers Football Club
- Founded: 2023
- Ground: Ughelli Township Stadium
- Chairman: Oke Umurhohwo
- Manager: Ekete Nyerovwo
- League: Nationwide League One
- Website: www.ughellirovers.com
Home colours	Away colours	Third colours

Ughelli Rovers Football Club (a.k.a. Ughelli Rovers FC) is a football club based in Ughelli, Delta State, Nigeria and play in the Nigeria Nationwide League the third tier of Nigerian football League.

== Current squad ==
As of April 2024 Note: Flags indicate national team as defined under FIFA eligibility rules; some limited exceptions apply. Players may hold more than one non-FIFA nationality.

No.	Pos.	Nation	Player
1	GK	NGA	Onoabeje Justine
2	DF	NGA	Ayoro Miracle
3	DF	NGA	Etamijeta Charles
4	DF	NGA	Difference Frank
5	DF	NGA	Alex Marvel
6	MF	NGA	Ihensenkhien Alex
7	MF	NGA	Alex Marvel
8	MF	NGA	Omere Jeffery Ebruphiyor
9	FW	NGA	Oguori Elijah
10	FW	NGA	Ukoni Kingsley
11	FW	NGA	Afure Oboyibo
12	MF	NGA	Oyabevwe Joshua Tobore
13	DF	NGA	Awha Jekinson
14	FW	NGA	Osim Douglas
15	MF	NGA	Akoni Lucky
16	FW	NGA	Ogbogwu Ekene
17	MF	NGA	Adolphus Ibinabo
18	MF	NGA	Idjesah Efetobore
19	MF	NGA	Izon Pere-Keme
20	MF	NGA	Temitayo Ajomole
21	GK	NGA	Efe Bartholomew
22	MF	NGA	Samuel Pare
23	MF	NGA	Onwualu Chukubeze Lawson
24	MF	NGA	Kator Sammie
25	MF	NGA	Alibor Andrew

== Sponsors ==
Period	Kit manufacturer	Shirt sponsor
2023–present	—	Itel

== Administration ==
Management

Role	Staff
Founder and Chairman	Hon. Oke Umurhohwo
Head of Business Development and Strategy	Taria Yarhere
Sporting Director	Wale Adigun
Technical Adviser	Olaogbegbikan Oluwatosin Ganiyu
Football Development Officer	Emma Kporharor

=== Coaching staff ===
Role	Staff
Head Coach	Ekete Nyerovwo
Assistant Coach	Johnson Oghenetega Jackson
Goalkeeper Coach	Tuxedo Charles Waxco
Academy Coach	Otuada Davidson Otega
Physiotherapist	Okoye Modesta Nzubechukwu

== Honours ==
=== Domestic ===
- Asaba Super Cup
  - Champions: (1) 2024
