= Asaba Super Cup =

The Asaba Super Cup started in December 2023 with an exhibition edition and was founded by Delta Marines FC. Asaba Super Cup is an annual football tournament in Nigeria. The 2024 edition was won by Ughelli Rovers FC, while Grassrunners FC won the 2025 edition after a lone goal by Congolese youngster, Bonaventure Lendambi, gave Grassrunners the victory against Ughelli Rovers FC in the 2025 Final Match.

In 2025, Sofascore became the official exclusive technical livescore app partner of the tournament, making live results available globally to football fans worldwide.

The Final tournament schedule of matches, scores and table of the 2025 edition can be found here.

Also, in 2025, the tournament entered into an official partnership with Prostar Sports to supply the official match ball of the tournament. FunZ also became the official ticketing partner of the tournament in 2025.

2025 Edition

The 2025 edition held in March 2025 and the following 8 teams participated:

Grassrunners FC

Ughelli Rovers FC

Winsome FC

African Holdings FC

Ndame FA

Young Shall Grow FA

ABC Starlets FC

Delta Marines FC Group A

Group A

Grassrunners FC

Winsome FC

Ndame FA

Delta Marines FC Group B

Group B

Ughelli Rovers FC

African Holding FA

ABC Starlets FC

Young Shall Grow FA

Results (Group Stage)

Matchday 1

Ndame FA 0 - 1 Grassrunners FC

Delta Marines FC 0 - 4 Winsome FC

Young Shall Grow FA 0 - 0 African Holding FC

Ughelli Rovers FC 3 - 0 ABC Starlets FA

Matchday 2

Delta Marines FC 3 - 4 Grassrunners FC

Ndame FA 0 - 2 Winsome FC

Ughelli Rovers FC 0 - 0 African Holding FC

ABC Starlets FA 0 - 0 Young Shall Grow FA

Matchday 3

Grassrunners FC 1 - 0 Winsome FC

Delta Marines FC 1 - 3 Ndame FA

Young Shall Grow FA 0 - 2 Ughelli Rovers FC

African Holding FC 2 - 0 ABC Starlets FA

3rd Place Final Play-Offs

Winsome FC 3 - 1 African Holding

Final Match

Grassrunners FC 1 - 0 Ughelli Rovers FC

2025 Goal Scorers

Bonaventure Lendambi - Grassrunners FC - 4 goals

Mitchell Godfrey - Winsome FC - 4 goals

Anthony Adon - Winsome FC - 3

Gabriel Friday - Delta Marines FC - 3 goals

Oluwasegun Taofeek - African Holding FC - 3 goals

Great Udori - Ughelli Rovers FC - 2 goals

Collins Ndego - Ndame FA - 2 goals

Unoro Joshua - Grassrunners FC - 1 goal

Ekoboye Michael - Winsome FC - 1 goal

Arede Promise - Ughelli Rovers FC - 1 goal

Samuel Pare - Ughelli Rovers FC - 1 goal

Samuel Erukeoghene - Ughelli Rovers FC - 1 goal

Michael Emmanuel - Delta Marines FC - 1 goal

Isiaq Samsudeen - Grassrunners FC - 1 goal

Agbeniyi Oladotun - Ndame FA - 1 goal

Shammah Isiayeh - Winsome FC - 1 goal All Time Goal Scorers Chart

All Time Goal Scorers Chart

Great Udori - Ughelli Rovers FC - 5 goals

Bonaventure Lendambi - Grassrunners FC - 4 goals

Mitchell Godfrey - Winsome FC - 4 goals

Anthony Adon - Winsome FC - 3

Gabriel Friday - Delta Marines FC - 3 goals

Oluwasegun Taofeek - African Holding FC - 3 goals

Collins Ndego - Ndame FA - 2 goals

Austine Ebikemiebornimughan - Delta Marines FC - 1 goal

Chris Nzeh - Delta Marines FC - 1 goal

Nnabuife Chukwurah - Delta Lions FC - 1 goal

Unoro Joshua - Grassrunners FC - 1 goal

Ekoboye Michael - Winsome FC - 1 goal

Arede Promise - Ughelli Rovers FC - 1 goal

Samuel Pare - Ughelli Rovers FC - 1 goal

Samuel Erukeoghene - Ughelli Rovers FC - 1 goal

Michael Emmanuel - Delta Marines FC - 1 goal

Isiaq Samsudeen - Grassrunners FC - 1 goal

Agbeniyi Oladotun - Ndame FA - 1 goal

Shammah Isiayeh - Winsome FC - 1 goal

== 2023 edition ==
The 2023 edition was sponsored partly by Air Peace. A total of 10 teams participated:

- Delta Marines FC
- Delta Lions FC
- Ndame FA
- Sporting FC Warri
- Young Shall Grow FC
- Ihu-Iyase FC
- Ekuku-Agbor FC
- Traveling FA
- Delta Marines FA

== 2024 edition ==
The 202 4 edition was sponsored by Bet9ja, one of Nigeria's foremost betting companies and marked the beginning of the competitive editions. The following 4 teams participated:

- Delta Marines FC
- Ughelli Rovers FC
- Delta Lions FC
- Asaba City FC

=== Results ===
1st Semi Final

- Date: 1 August 2024
- Venue: Stephen Keshi Stadium, Asaba
- Asaba City FC 0 vs 2 Ughelli Rovers FC

2nd Semi Final

- Date: 1 August 2024
- Venue: Stephen Keshi Stadium, Asaba
- Delta Lions FC 1 vs 2 Delta Marines FC

Third Place Match

- Date: 3 August 2024
- Venue: Stephen Keshi Stadium, Asaba
- Asaba City FC 0 (3) penalties vs (5) penalties 0 Delta Lions FC

Final Match

- Date: 3 August 2024
- Venue: Stephen Keshi Stadium, Asaba
- Delta Marines FC 0 vs 1 Ughelli Rovers FC

Goal Scorers:

- Great Udori - Ughelli Rovers FC - 3 goals
- Austine Ebikemiebornimughan - Delta Marines FC - 1 goal
- Chris Nzeh - Delta Marines FC - 1 goal
- Nnabuife Chukwurah - Delta Lions FC - 1 goal
