= List of football clubs in Nigeria by major honours won =

This is a list of the major honours won by football clubs in Nigeria. It lists every Nigerian association football club to have won any of the domestic, regional or continental trophies recognized as major titles by NFF, WAFU or CAF.

== Official competitions ==
Key	Competition	Notes
Domestic competitions (NFF)
L	NPFL	The national top professional football league.
C	Nigeria Federation Cup	The national cup tournament.
SC	Nigeria Super Cup (hiatus)	Also known as Charity Cup or Charity Shield, contested by the Federation Cup and NPFL winners.
Regional competitions (WAFU)
WACC	West African Club Championship (defunct)	An international regional competition for the runners-up or third place of each West African country's domestic league.
Continental competitions (CAF)
CCL	CAF Champions League	The premier international continental club competition in Africa organized by CAF. Formerly the African Cup of Champions Clubs, it was founded in 1964.
CCC	CAF Confederation Cup	The secondary African club competition organized by CAF. It was founded in 2004.
CSC	CAF Super Cup	Founded in 1993, it pits the winner of the Champions League against the winner of the CAF Confederation Cup.
ACWC	African Cup Winners' Cup (defunct)	A defunct international continental club competition organized by CAF. It was played between the winning clubs of domestic cups in CAF-affiliated nations from 1975 till 2004.
CC	CAF Cup	A defunct annual club competition organised by the CAF for domestic leagues runners-up of member associations who have not qualified to one of the two pre-existing CAF international club competitions from 1992 to 2004.

== Honours table ==
Clubs in italics are defunct.

Rank	Club	Domestic titles				Regional titles		Continental titles						Overall titles
Rank	Club	L	C	SC	Total	WACC	Total	CCL	CCC	CSC	ACWC	CC	Total	Overall titles
1	Enyimba	9	4	2	15	–	–	2	–	2	–	–	4	19
2	Enugu Rangers	9	6	1	16	–	–	–	–	–	1	–	1	17
3	Shooting Stars	5	8	–	13	1	1	–	–	–	1	1	2	16
4	Heartland	5	3	2	10	–	–	–	–	–	–	–	–	10
5	Bendel Insurance	2	4	–	6	3	3	–	–	–	–	1	1	10
6	Kano Pillars	4	2	1	7	–	–	–	–	–	–	–	–	7
6	Dolphins	3	4	–	7	–	–	–	–	–	–	–	–	7
6	Stationery Stores	1	4	2	7	–	–	–	–	–	–	–	–	7
6	Lagos Railways	–	7	–	7	–	–	–	–	–	–	–	–	7
10	BCC Lions	1	4	–	5	–	–	–	–	–	1	–	1	6
10	Julius Berger	2	2	2	6	–	–	–	–	–	–	–	–	6
12	Akwa United	1	2	1	4	–	–	–	–	–	–	–	–	4
12	Lobi Stars	1	1	2	4	–	–	–	–	–	–	–	–	4
14	El-Kanemi Warriors	–	4	–	4	–	–	–	–	–	–	–	–	4
15	New Nigeria Bank	1	–	–	1	2	2	–	–	–	–	–	–	3
15	Leventis United	1	2	–	3	–	–	–	–	–	–	–	–	3
15	Bayelsa United	1	1	1	3	–	–	–	–	–	–	–	–	3
15	Ocean Boys	1	1	1	3	–	–	–	–	–	–	–	–	3
15	Lagos ECN	–	3	–	3	–	–	–	–	–	–	–	–	3
15	Port Harcourt FC	–	3	-	3	–	–	–	–	–	–	–	–	3
21	Plateau United	1	1	–	2	–	–	–	–	–	–	–	–	2
21	Rivers United	1	–	–	1	–	–	–	–	–	–	–	–	1
21	Abiola Babes	–	2	–	2	–	–	–	–	–	–	–	–	2
21	Marine	–	2	–	2	–	–	–	–	–	–	–	–	2
21	Ifeanyi Ubah FC	–	1	1	2	–	–	–	–	–	–	–	–	2
26	Ranchers Bees	–	–	–	–	1	1	–	–	–	–	–	–	1
26	Sharks F.C.	–	–	–	–	1	1	–	–	–	–	–	–	1
26	Udoji United	1	–	–	1	–	–	–	–	–	–	–	–	1
26	Racca Rovers	1	–	–	1	–	–	–	–	–	–	–	–	1
26	Mighty Jets	1	–	–	1	–	–	–	–	–	–	–	–	1
26	Remo Stars	1	–	–	1	–	–	–	–	–	–	–	–	1
26	Niger Tornadoes	–	1	–	1	–	–	–	–	–	–	–	–	1
26	Lagos UAC	–	1	–	1	–	–	–	–	–	–	–	–	1
26	Lagos Police Machine	–	1	–	1	–	–	–	–	–	–	–	–	1
26	St Patrick's College	–	1	–	1	–	–	–	–	–	–	–	–	1
26	Kaduna United	–	1	–	1	–	–	–	–	–	–	–	–	1
26	Lagos PAN Bank	–	1	–	1	–	–	–	–	–	–	–	–	1
26	Wikki Tourists	–	1	–	1	–	–	–	–	–	–	–	–	1
26	Kwara United	–	1	–	1	–	–	–	–	–	–	–	–	1

== See also ==
- Football in Nigeria
- Nigerian Football Federation
- NPFL
