= Ughelli Township Stadium =

Sports venue in Ughelli, Nigeria

Coordinates: 5°28′52″N 6°1′22″E

- Interactive map of Ughelli Township Stadium
- Capacity: 5,000

Construction
- Opened: 2002

Tenant
- Ughelli Rovers Football Club

Ughelli Township Stadium is a stadium in Otovwodo, Ughelli North Local Government Area Delta State. It is currently used mostly for football matches and is the home stadium of Ughelli Rovers Football Club. The stadium has a capacity of 5,000 people and was built in 2002. It hosted matches for the 2006 Women's African Football Championship and for the 2008 WAFU U-20 Championship
