= Box2Box FC =

Nigerian football academy and football club

Box2Box Football Academy & Club
- Founded: 2013
- Stadium: Legacy Practise Pitch, National Stadium, Surulere, Lagos
- Owner(s): Akeem Shira Yusuf & Babatunde Ariyo Igbayilola
- Technical Adviser: Randy Reuben

Box2Box FC is a football talent development hub and a youth football club based in Surulere, Lagos, Nigeria, focused on football development in the country. The football club operates a youth football training system with the goal of preparing talented footballers for a professional football career.

The team is said to not be involved in any league game or competition in Nigeria but however, focus on training and developing talents to expose them to the world of football.

== Technical staffs ==
- Technical Adviser - Randy Reuben
- Head Coach - Taofeek Omolayo

== Notable players ==
Several notable names and players have passed through the academy. The list includes Tolu Arokodare who plays for the Super Eagles of Nigeria and Wolverhampton Wanderers in the English Premier League. Others are Rafiu Durosinmi who plays for Pisa SC in the Serie A.
