= Atlantic Business Football Club =

Nigerian football club

Atlantic Business FC
- Full name: Atlantic Business Football Club
- Nicknames: God's Own Team; ABFC
- Founded: 2017
- Ground: Otunba Dipo Dina International Stadium
- Capacity: 20,000
- Chairman: Henry Obinna Ekweariri
- Manager: Daniel Japhet
- League: Nigeria Nationwide League
- 2024-25: Nigeria Nationwide League, 6th - Ebedei Centre
- Website: atlanticbusinessfc.com
Home colours	Away colours	Third colours

Atlantic Business Football Club (commonly referred to as Atlantic Business FC or ABFC) is a Nigerian amateur football club based in Ijebu-Ode, Ogun state. The club currently competes in the Nigeria Nationwide League (NLO), the 3rd tier of the Nigerian football league system.

== History ==
The club was founded in 2017 at Igbo Efon, Lekki, Lagos state as Atlantic Football Club, making its debut in the NLO Division 2, the fourth tier of the Nigerian football league system.

In 2020, it rebranded and became known as Atlantic Business Football Club. It also moved from Igbo Efon to Epe and then to Ijebu-Ode, its current home.

In 2024, the club was promoted to the NLO after finishing second in NLO Division 2.

The club also competes in the Nigeria Federation Cup, Nigeria Youth League Cup and The Creative Championship (TCC).

On 6 June 2025, the club transferred Chinedu Umeh to SJK for an undisclosed fee. During his time at ABFC, he scored 65 goals in 120 appearances across all competitions.

On 24 July 2025, the club announced that former Nigerian forward, Brown Ideye, had joined them as Director of Player Pathways and Partnerships.

== Colours ==
The primary color for ABFC is white. Its away strip is blue, while its alternate colour is yellow.

== Stadium ==
ABFC plays its home games at the 20,000 capacity Otunba Dipo Dina International Stadium in Ijebu Ode, Ogun state.

== 2024-25 Season ==
The club participated in its maiden NLO season in 2024-25. It finished 6th in its group (Ebedei Centre), failing to qualify for the playoffs, and it placed 4th in The Creative Championship won by Real Sapphire F.C. The club's U-19 team also qualified for the Nigeria Youth League Cup (NYLC) Super 8, reaching the final and losing 3-2 to Kwara United U-19.

=== Controversy ===
On 6 May 2025, a post-match brawl erupted between ABFC and Grassrunners FC players and officials. The league suspended Grassrunners' Jimoh Olamilekan Ibrahim (identified as the instigator) and four teammates, along with several ABFC players. Both clubs were fined ₦100,000. A friendly "Unity Match" was later held to ease tensions between both clubs and condemn hooliganism.

== Honours & Achievements ==
- NLO Division 2
  - Runners-up (1): 2023
- Nigeria Youth League Cup
  - Runners-up (1): 2025

== Boardroom and Management ==
=== Boardroom ===
Name	Role
(Nigeria) Henry Obinna Ekweariri	President
(Nigeria) Lucianne Ekweariri	Vice President
(Nigeria) Sule Momoh	General Manager
(Nigeria) Brown Ideye	Director of Player Pathways and Partnerships
(Nigeria) Desmond Oke Oghenekome	Head of Media/Production
(Nigeria) Tunde Young Akinloye	Communications Director

=== Management ===
Name	Role
(Nigeria) Daniel Japhet	Head Coach
(Nigeria) Unyime Afia	Assistant Coach
(Nigeria) Moghalu Franklin	Goalkeeper Coach
(Nigeria) Olayinka Adiro	Team Manager
(Nigeria) Cosmos Onyegbulam	Team Coordinator

== Transfers ==
S/N	Player	To	Year
1.	(Nigeria) Chisom Okereke	(Nigeria) Nasarawa	2021
2.	(Nigeria) Mustapha Abiodun	(Serbia) IMT Belgrade	2023
3.	(Nigeria) Chinedu Umeh	(Finland) SJK	2025

== Coaches ==
Name	Tenure
(Nigeria) Sule Momoh	2017 - 2020
(Nigeria) Warri Charles	2020 - 2021
(Nigeria) Olayinka Adiro	2021 - 2023
(Nigeria) Warri Charles	2023 - 2024
(Nigeria) Daniel Japhet	2024 - present
