= Southern Nigeria =

Southern Nigeria may refer to:

- The southern part of Nigeria, which tends to be more Christian and animist than the Muslim north; also where most of the country's oil is located
- Southern Nigeria Protectorate, an area of Nigeria formerly under British rule
