= DSS F.C. =

Nigerian football club

Dynamic Sporting Solutions Football Club
- Founded: 2011
- Ground: Ranchers Bees Stadium, Kaduna
- Capacity: 10,000
- Chairman: Sunday Adeleye
- Manager: Tunde Sanni
- League: Nigeria National League
- Website: http://www.dynamicsportingsolutions.com/dssfc.htm

DSS FC is a Nigerian football club. They play in the second-tier division in Nigerian football, the Nigeria National League. 10,000 capacity Ranchers Bees Stadium is their home venue. In 2017 they announced a deal which made Gibraltar Second Division club F.C. Olympique 13 their feeder club.
