= Nigeria Nationwide League =

Nigeria Nationwide League Division One
- Founded: 2001
- Country: Nigeria
- Confederation: CAF
- Number of clubs: 91 (80 on 2017)
- Level on pyramid: 3
- Promotion to: Nigeria National League
- Relegation to: Nigeria Amateur League Division Two
- Domestic cup: Nigerian FA Cup
- Website: nigerianationwideleague.com

National Nationwide League Division One (formerly known as Nigerian Amateur League) is the third level of club football in Nigerian football league system. Every year, up to eight teams are promoted to the Nigeria National League.

Starting in 2012, the league changed its name from the Amateur League and will promote three teams per division instead of two. This was after a long delay in confirming promotions from the prior year due to teams' protests.

As the "largest grassroots league in the world", promotion and relegation are not guaranteed. Most of the teams are sponsored by private citizens or Local Govt. Areas and funding at this level is minimal. Any team eligible to move to the National Division 1 must qualify for a Professional League license and commit to the increased spending. After the 2007/08 season Dankalat FC of Kano won promotion, but instead sold their slot in Division 1A to Calabar Rovers. (Dankalat would eventually sell their slot in the 2012 Professional League to Nembe City FC). For the 2013 season, FC Ebedei and Makwada remained in the Nationwide league and sold their promotion slots after winning their divisions. Bolowotan, who also won promotion, sold their slot after 9 games in the professional level.

After the 2016 season, the league doubled in size to 80 teams. Teams will play in five-team divisions, with the winner of each division playing the corresponding Group for the one promotion slot.

The 2019/20 season was cancelled and affected by the COVID-19 that forced all activities to a stop. Hence, no promotion or relegation of teams.

== 2021-22 ==
The 2021-22 season had 132 teams playing in sixteen groups in sixteen venues (originally eight) and began the first weekend of March.

Ikenne Group 1

- Buruj FC, Lagos State
- FC Bulmaro, Lagos State
- Gbagada FC, Lagos State
- Iganmu FC, Lagos State
- Destiny Boys FC, Lagos State
- AS Racine FC, Lagos State
- BYT (Best Young Talents) FC, Lagos State
- Emmydinho FC, Lagos State
- Magate FC, Lagos State
- Zenith Emperor FC, Lagos State

Ikenne Group 2

- Spartans FC, Lagos State
- Jossy FC, Lagos State
- Messiah FC, Lagos State
- Collins Edwin FC, Lagos State
- Valiant FC, Lagos State
- Cincinnati FC, Lagos State
- Tradesafe Sports FC, Lagos State
- First Bank F.C., Lagos State
- Madiba FC, Lagos State

Ado Ekiti Group 1 (Kayode Olufemi Stadium)

- Ijebu United, Ogun State
- Olumo United, Ogun State
- Dino SC, Ogun State
- Pacesetters FC, Oyo State
- Easy-Well FC, Ogun State
- OSOPADEC (Ondo State Oil Producing Areas Development Commission,) FC, Ondo State
- Offa FC, Kwara State
- Imperial FC, Ogun State

Ado Ekiti Group 2 (Federal Polytechnic Stadium)

- Olisa FC, Ogun State
- Juvenile FC, Ogun State
- Almar FC, Ogun State
- Akure City FC, Ondo State
- Abray Sports FC, Kwara State
- SGFC Athletics SC, Kwara State
- Estate FC, Ogun State
- Gidado FC, Kwara State
- Positive Football Academy, Oyo State

Ilorin Group 1 (Kwara FA Stadium)

- Kaduna United F.C.

Ilorin Group 1 (Ilorin Stadium)

Univ. of Port Harcourt

Calabar (Esuene Stadium)

Jos Group 1 (Rwang Pam Stadium)

Jos Group 2 (Zaria Road Stadium)

Ngor-Okpala Stadium

Okigwe Stadium

Bauchi Group 1 (AT Bello Stadium)

Bauchi Group 2 (Federal Polytechnic Stadium)

Zaria Group

Kaduna Group (Ranchers Bees Stadium)

- ASDC FC, ABuja
- Supreme Court FC, Abuja
- Police Machine FC, Abuja
- FC Chika Malami, Kebbi State
- Zoo United, Kano State
- Ramcy United, Kano State
- Katsina Juniors, Katsina State

== 2023-24 ==
Venue 1 - Lagos Centre (Legacy Pitch)

| Club | State |
|---|---|
| FC Robo | Lagos |
| Synergy Ultimate SC | Lagos |
| Magic Stars FC | Lagos |
| Gbagada FC | Lagos |
| Broad City FC | Lagos |
| Dannaz FC | Lagos |
| Ablaze FC | Lagos |
| Allifey FC | Lagos |
| Lekki United | Lagos |
| TCCG FC | Lagos |

Delta Centre

| Club | State |
|---|---|
| Holly Arrows FC | Delta |
| OYC FC | Delta |
| Ughelli Rovers FC | Delta |
| Isoko United | Delta |
| Delta Marines FC | Delta |
| Rolly FC | Edo |
| FC Deltra | Edo |
| Junosa United FC | Edo |
| Living Vioice Fc | Edo |
| Morsko Int. Fc | Edo |

== 2024–25 ==
Venue 1 – Abba Bichi Centre
| Pos | Team | Pld | W | D | L | GF | GA | GD | Pts |
|---|---|---|---|---|---|---|---|---|---|
| 1 | Kano Ambassadors FC | 10 | 9 | 0 | 1 | 32 | 16 | +16 | 27 |
| 2 | Zango | 10 | 6 | 1 | 3 | 20 | 18 | +2 | 19 |
| 3 | Hausawa United FC | 10 | 5 | 2 | 3 | 19 | 20 | −1 | 17 |
| 4 | ATK FC Kano | 10 | 5 | 1 | 4 | 24 | 21 | +3 | 16 |
| 5 | SBS FC (Waliyya) | 10 | 4 | 2 | 4 | 25 | 24 | +1 | 14 |
| 6 | Orlu United FC | 10 | 4 | 1 | 5 | 19 | 23 | −4 | 13 |
| 7 | Tawiyya FC | 10 | 4 | 1 | 5 | 20 | 17 | +3 | 13 |
| 8 | Kano Travellers | 10 | 3 | 3 | 4 | 19 | 21 | −2 | 12 |
| 9 | Ganduje Babes FC | 10 | 2 | 4 | 4 | 14 | 20 | −6 | 10 |
| 10 | Funtua Sharks | 10 | 2 | 3 | 5 | 17 | 22 | −5 | 9 |
| 11 | Dantata FC | 10 | 2 | 0 | 8 | 20 | 27 | −7 | 6 |
| 12 | Funtua FC | 0 | 0 | 0 | 0 | 0 | 0 | 0 | 0 |

Source: Sofascore

Venue 2 – ABS Kaduna Centre
| Pos | Team | Pld | W | D | L | GF | GA | GD | Pts |
|---|---|---|---|---|---|---|---|---|---|
| 1 | Kaduna United | 9 | 6 | 3 | 0 | 20 | 7 | +13 | 21 |
| 2 | Simoiben | 9 | 6 | 2 | 1 | 12 | 3 | +9 | 20 |
| 3 | Standard FC | 9 | 5 | 3 | 1 | 16 | 9 | +7 | 18 |
| 4 | Future of Africa | 9 | 4 | 1 | 4 | 8 | 14 | −6 | 13 |
| 5 | ABU Zaria | 8 | 2 | 4 | 2 | 4 | 5 | −1 | 10 |
| 6 | Croc City FC | 9 | 2 | 3 | 4 | 7 | 9 | −2 | 9 |
| 7 | Green Beret FC | 9 | 2 | 3 | 4 | 7 | 10 | −3 | 9 |
| 8 | Fulfill United | 8 | 1 | 4 | 3 | 3 | 7 | −4 | 7 |
| 9 | Kada Warriors | 6 | 2 | 0 | 4 | 12 | 14 | −2 | 6 |
| 10 | Seat of God FC | 5 | 0 | 1 | 4 | 4 | 15 | −11 | 1 |

Source: Sofascore

Venue 3 – Area 3
| Pos | Team | Pld | W | D | L | GF | GA | GD | Pts |
|---|---|---|---|---|---|---|---|---|---|
| 1 | City Football Club | 6 | 6 | 0 | 0 | 25 | 5 | +20 | 18 |
| 2 | Police Machines FC | 6 | 5 | 0 | 1 | 15 | 3 | +12 | 15 |
| 3 | FWC Champions FC | 5 | 4 | 0 | 1 | 6 | 1 | +5 | 12 |
| 4 | Anglican | 6 | 4 | 0 | 2 | 16 | 13 | +3 | 12 |
| 5 | Mailantarki Care | 5 | 3 | 2 | 0 | 8 | 4 | +4 | 11 |
| 6 | Bussdors United FC | 6 | 2 | 1 | 3 | 7 | 8 | −1 | 7 |
| 7 | Derby | 5 | 1 | 2 | 2 | 4 | 6 | −2 | 5 |
| 8 | EFCC | 5 | 0 | 4 | 1 | 2 | 3 | −1 | 4 |
| 9 | Woodpecker FC | 5 | 1 | 1 | 3 | 6 | 9 | −3 | 4 |
| 10 | Black Scorpion FC | 6 | 1 | 1 | 4 | 6 | 23 | −17 | 4 |
| 11 | PCC FC | 5 | 0 | 3 | 2 | 5 | 8 | −3 | 3 |
| 12 | Paul EFC | 6 | 1 | 0 | 5 | 4 | 9 | −5 | 3 |
| 13 | Beautiful Tour FC | 6 | 0 | 2 | 4 | 7 | 19 | −12 | 2 |
| 14 | Supreme Court | 0 | 0 | 0 | 0 | 0 | 0 | 0 | 0 |

Source: Sofascore

Venue 4 – ATBS Bauchi Centre
| Pos | Team | Pld | W | D | L | GF | GA | GD | Pts |
|---|---|---|---|---|---|---|---|---|---|
| 1 | Warinijie FC | 7 | 5 | 2 | 0 | 20 | 3 | +17 | 17 |
| 2 | Adamu Jumba FC | 7 | 5 | 1 | 1 | 19 | 7 | +12 | 16 |
| 3 | Kufca Azare FC | 7 | 5 | 0 | 2 | 8 | 8 | 0 | 15 |
| 4 | Misau United FC | 7 | 2 | 2 | 3 | 8 | 14 | −6 | 8 |
| 5 | Wunti FC | 7 | 2 | 2 | 3 | 13 | 13 | 0 | 8 |
| 6 | Abj FC Bauchi | 7 | 2 | 1 | 4 | 8 | 13 | −5 | 7 |
| 7 | Wikki Tourists Feeder FC | 7 | 1 | 4 | 2 | 11 | 13 | −2 | 7 |
| 8 | Zabgai International FC | 7 | 0 | 0 | 7 | 7 | 23 | −16 | 0 |

Source: Sofascore

Venue 5 – Awka Centre 1
| Pos | Team | Pld | W | D | L | GF | GA | GD | Pts |
|---|---|---|---|---|---|---|---|---|---|
| 1 | Ikukuoma FC | 6 | 5 | 0 | 1 | 17 | 7 | +10 | 15 |
| 2 | Oisa FC | 6 | 5 | 0 | 1 | 13 | 2 | +11 | 15 |
| 3 | Ingas FC | 6 | 4 | 0 | 2 | 10 | 8 | +2 | 12 |
| 4 | Kun Khalifat B | 6 | 3 | 0 | 3 | 7 | 12 | −5 | 9 |
| 5 | Ekomzy FC | 6 | 2 | 1 | 3 | 9 | 12 | −3 | 7 |
| 6 | Giant Brillars | 6 | 1 | 1 | 4 | 13 | 14 | −1 | 4 |
| 7 | Early Star | 0 | 0 | 0 | 0 | 0 | 0 | 0 | 0 |
| 8 | Don-Daniel FC | 6 | 0 | 0 | 6 | 6 | 20 | −14 | 0 |

Source: Sofascore

Venue 6 – Awka Centre 2
| Pos | Team | Pld | W | D | L | GF | GA | GD | Pts |
|---|---|---|---|---|---|---|---|---|---|
| 1 | Campos FC | 5 | 4 | 0 | 1 | 20 | 6 | +14 | 12 |
| 2 | Ozalla FC | 6 | 4 | 0 | 2 | 12 | 9 | +3 | 12 |
| 3 | Diana Emi | 5 | 2 | 2 | 1 | 4 | 3 | +1 | 8 |
| 4 | Heartland Feeders FC | 6 | 2 | 2 | 2 | 6 | 6 | 0 | 8 |
| 5 | St Nwadinso FC | 6 | 2 | 1 | 3 | 8 | 8 | 0 | 7 |
| 6 | Peace FC | 5 | 1 | 3 | 1 | 7 | 7 | 0 | 6 |
| 7 | First Mahi FC | 0 | 0 | 0 | 0 | 0 | 0 | 0 | 0 |
| 8 | A & A FC | 5 | 0 | 0 | 5 | 7 | 25 | −18 | 0 |

Source: Sofascore

Venue 7 – Barau Centre
| Pos | Team | Pld | W | D | L | GF | GA | GD | Pts |
|---|---|---|---|---|---|---|---|---|---|
| 1 | Clever Warriors FC | 10 | 8 | 2 | 0 | 31 | 8 | +23 | 26 |
| 2 | Kwankwasiyya FC | 11 | 6 | 4 | 1 | 27 | 12 | +15 | 22 |
| 3 | Dromeda | 11 | 7 | 0 | 4 | 25 | 17 | +8 | 21 |
| 4 | Kano Pillars Feeders | 9 | 6 | 2 | 1 | 24 | 10 | +14 | 20 |
| 5 | Dambatta | 11 | 5 | 1 | 5 | 23 | 20 | +3 | 16 |
| 6 | Super Stars Sheika | 10 | 4 | 3 | 3 | 21 | 20 | +1 | 15 |
| 7 | Shield FC | 10 | 4 | 2 | 4 | 18 | 17 | +1 | 14 |
| 8 | Gaida Utd FC | 10 | 3 | 1 | 6 | 17 | 21 | −4 | 10 |
| 9 | Kano Stars FC | 10 | 2 | 2 | 6 | 12 | 22 | −10 | 8 |
| 10 | Royal FC | 10 | 1 | 2 | 7 | 16 | 33 | −17 | 5 |
| 11 | Sky Limit FC | 4 | 1 | 1 | 2 | 2 | 7 | −5 | 4 |
| 12 | Goodhope | 10 | 1 | 0 | 9 | 12 | 41 | −29 | 3 |

Source: Sofascore

Venue 8 – Bwari Centre
| Pos | Team | Pld | W | D | L | GF | GA | GD | Pts |
|---|---|---|---|---|---|---|---|---|---|
| 1 | Fosla FC | 11 | 8 | 2 | 1 | 13 | 8 | +5 | 26 |
| 2 | Campro | 11 | 8 | 1 | 2 | 28 | 8 | +20 | 25 |
| 3 | N-Youth Sports Academy | 11 | 6 | 3 | 2 | 17 | 10 | +7 | 21 |
| 4 | Legacy Stars | 11 | 6 | 3 | 2 | 18 | 11 | +7 | 21 |
| 5 | Hypebuzz FA | 11 | 5 | 2 | 4 | 25 | 20 | +5 | 17 |
| 6 | Likeminds FC | 11 | 4 | 4 | 3 | 17 | 14 | +3 | 16 |
| 7 | Rmb Sports | 11 | 4 | 1 | 6 | 14 | 17 | −3 | 13 |
| 8 | Daniel FA | 11 | 2 | 5 | 4 | 14 | 20 | −6 | 11 |
| 9 | Planet Futsal | 11 | 2 | 4 | 5 | 15 | 18 | −3 | 10 |
| 10 | De-Royal Galaxy | 11 | 2 | 2 | 7 | 12 | 24 | −12 | 8 |
| 11 | Galadima FC | 11 | 1 | 4 | 6 | 13 | 23 | −10 | 7 |
| 12 | Total Dazzlers | 11 | 1 | 3 | 7 | 8 | 21 | −13 | 6 |
| 13 | NYSC | 0 | 0 | 0 | 0 | 0 | 0 | 0 | 0 |

Source: Sofascore

Venue 9 – Ebedei Centre
| Pos | Team | Pld | W | D | L | GF | GA | GD | Pts |
|---|---|---|---|---|---|---|---|---|---|
| 1 | FC Ebedei | 11 | 9 | 2 | 0 | 24 | 9 | +15 | 29 |
| 2 | Ijebu Athletic | 11 | 6 | 2 | 3 | 22 | 16 | +6 | 20 |
| 3 | Imperial FC | 11 | 5 | 3 | 3 | 26 | 22 | +4 | 18 |
| 4 | VOE FC | 11 | 5 | 2 | 4 | 28 | 18 | +10 | 17 |
| 5 | Grassrunners FC | 11 | 5 | 1 | 5 | 23 | 12 | +11 | 16 |
| 6 | Atlantic Business FC | 12 | 5 | 1 | 6 | 22 | 26 | −4 | 16 |
| 7 | Star Builders FC | 11 | 5 | 1 | 5 | 21 | 26 | −5 | 16 |
| 8 | Green Lock FC | 11 | 4 | 2 | 5 | 13 | 14 | −1 | 14 |
| 9 | Ladegbuwa FC | 11 | 4 | 1 | 6 | 17 | 18 | −1 | 13 |
| 10 | Sagamu Rovers | 11 | 3 | 3 | 5 | 12 | 19 | −7 | 12 |
| 11 | SGFC Athletics SC | 10 | 3 | 2 | 5 | 10 | 23 | −13 | 11 |
| 12 | Almar FC | 11 | 1 | 2 | 8 | 14 | 29 | −15 | 5 |

Source: Sofascore

Venue 10 – Gombe Centre
| Pos | Team | Pld | W | D | L | GF | GA | GD | Pts |
|---|---|---|---|---|---|---|---|---|---|
| 1 | FC Yarmalight | 4 | 4 | 0 | 0 | 11 | 1 | +10 | 12 |
| 2 | Zaki Mairiga FC | 4 | 3 | 0 | 1 | 6 | 3 | +3 | 9 |
| 3 | El-Shamah Sport FC | 4 | 1 | 0 | 3 | 5 | 9 | −4 | 3 |
| 4 | Police Baretta FC | 4 | 1 | 0 | 3 | 4 | 8 | −4 | 3 |
| 5 | Future Hope | 4 | 1 | 0 | 3 | 6 | 11 | −5 | 3 |

Source: Sofascore

Venue 11 – Gumel Centre Jigawa
| Pos | Team | Pld | W | D | L | GF | GA | GD | Pts |
|---|---|---|---|---|---|---|---|---|---|
| 1 | AVM Football Club | 5 | 5 | 0 | 0 | 19 | 8 | +11 | 15 |
| 2 | Gimzsoca FC | 5 | 3 | 1 | 1 | 10 | 9 | +1 | 10 |
| 3 | Jigawa Golden Stars | 5 | 2 | 1 | 2 | 6 | 6 | 0 | 7 |
| 4 | Halfa FC | 5 | 2 | 0 | 3 | 14 | 11 | +3 | 6 |
| 5 | Rising Stars FC | 5 | 1 | 0 | 4 | 8 | 18 | −10 | 3 |
| 6 | Dutse Strikers | 5 | 1 | 0 | 4 | 9 | 14 | −5 | 3 |

Source: Sofascore

Venue 12 – Ijebu-Ode Centre
| Pos | Team | Pld | W | D | L | GF | GA | GD | Pts |
|---|---|---|---|---|---|---|---|---|---|
| 1 | Ekiti United | 6 | 5 | 1 | 0 | 13 | 0 | +13 | 16 |
| 2 | Adamimogo FC | 6 | 5 | 0 | 1 | 11 | 7 | +4 | 15 |
| 3 | Living Voices FC | 5 | 3 | 2 | 0 | 8 | 1 | +7 | 11 |
| 4 | Bendel Insurance Feeder | 4 | 3 | 1 | 0 | 8 | 1 | +7 | 10 |
| 5 | Olukismet FC Ikere | 6 | 3 | 1 | 2 | 8 | 6 | +2 | 10 |
| 6 | Big 100 FC | 5 | 3 | 0 | 2 | 11 | 5 | +6 | 9 |
| 7 | Emalex FC Owo | 6 | 3 | 0 | 3 | 12 | 12 | 0 | 9 |
| 8 | Wonder Xchange | 6 | 2 | 2 | 2 | 12 | 11 | +1 | 8 |
| 9 | Rolly FC | 4 | 1 | 0 | 3 | 5 | 7 | −2 | 3 |
| 10 | Choice FC Int | 6 | 1 | 0 | 5 | 7 | 12 | −5 | 3 |
| 11 | FC Deltra | 4 | 1 | 0 | 3 | 2 | 7 | −5 | 3 |
| 12 | Junosa United | 4 | 0 | 1 | 3 | 1 | 14 | −13 | 1 |
| 13 | Ablegod FC | 0 | 0 | 0 | 0 | 0 | 0 | 0 | 0 |
| 14 | Esan Olika Uromi | 0 | 0 | 0 | 0 | 0 | 0 | 0 | 0 |
| 15 | Reignz FC Owo | 6 | 0 | 0 | 6 | 4 | 19 | −15 | 0 |

Source: Sofascore

Venue 13 – Ikorodu A Centre
| Pos | Team | Pld | W | D | L | GF | GA | GD | Pts |
|---|---|---|---|---|---|---|---|---|---|
| 1 | Real Sapphire FC | 7 | 6 | 1 | 0 | 22 | 7 | +15 | 19 |
| 2 | Toma | 7 | 5 | 0 | 2 | 13 | 9 | +4 | 15 |
| 3 | Ooim FC | 7 | 4 | 2 | 1 | 16 | 8 | +8 | 14 |
| 4 | Crowned Academy | 7 | 3 | 0 | 4 | 18 | 18 | 0 | 9 |
| 5 | Zenith Emperor FC | 7 | 3 | 0 | 4 | 19 | 18 | +1 | 9 |
| 6 | FC Athletic | 7 | 2 | 2 | 3 | 15 | 13 | +2 | 8 |
| 7 | Alimcity FA | 7 | 2 | 0 | 5 | 10 | 20 | −10 | 6 |
| 8 | Buruj FC | 7 | 0 | 1 | 6 | 3 | 23 | −20 | 1 |
| 9 | Byt FC | 0 | 0 | 0 | 0 | 0 | 0 | 0 | 0 |

Source: Sofascore

Venue 14 – Ikorodu B Centre
| Pos | Team | Pld | W | D | L | GF | GA | GD | Pts |
|---|---|---|---|---|---|---|---|---|---|
| 1 | Joy Cometh FC | 8 | 7 | 0 | 1 | 23 | 10 | +13 | 21 |
| 2 | Tonic | 8 | 6 | 1 | 1 | 20 | 10 | +10 | 19 |
| 3 | Brighton FA | 7 | 4 | 0 | 3 | 19 | 14 | +5 | 12 |
| 4 | Valiant FC | 8 | 4 | 0 | 4 | 18 | 14 | +4 | 12 |
| 5 | Ablaze FC | 8 | 3 | 3 | 2 | 18 | 16 | +2 | 12 |
| 6 | TCCG FC | 8 | 3 | 2 | 3 | 13 | 13 | 0 | 11 |
| 7 | Comfortedge | 8 | 3 | 2 | 3 | 15 | 17 | −2 | 11 |
| 8 | Daja United | 7 | 1 | 0 | 6 | 8 | 17 | −9 | 3 |
| 9 | Emerald FC | 8 | 0 | 0 | 8 | 6 | 29 | −23 | 0 |

Source: Sofascore

Venue 15 – Ilaro Centre
| Pos | Team | Pld | W | D | L | GF | GA | GD | Pts |
|---|---|---|---|---|---|---|---|---|---|
| 1 | Stormers | 10 | 7 | 2 | 1 | 19 | 3 | +16 | 22 (Note: 1 point deducted?) |
| 2 | Juvenile FC | 8 | 6 | 1 | 1 | 13 | 5 | +8 | 19 |
| 3 | Dino Sporting Club | 8 | 4 | 2 | 2 | 17 | 12 | +5 | 14 |
| 4 | Lasegski FC | 8 | 3 | 2 | 3 | 13 | 10 | +3 | 11 |
| 5 | Customs FC | 8 | 3 | 1 | 4 | 7 | 8 | −1 | 10 |
| 6 | BTFC | 8 | 3 | 1 | 4 | 10 | 11 | −1 | 10 |
| 7 | H2U | 8 | 3 | 0 | 5 | 10 | 17 | −7 | 9 |
| 8 | Ramond | 8 | 2 | 1 | 5 | 10 | 17 | −7 | 7 |
| 9 | Life Christ Outreach | 8 | 0 | 1 | 7 | 2 | 18 | −16 | 1 |
| 10 | Ottasolo FC | 0 | 0 | 0 | 0 | 0 | 0 | 0 | 0 |
| 11 | Ijebu United | 0 | 0 | 0 | 0 | 0 | 0 | 0 | 0 |

Source: Sofascore
Notes:

Venue 16 – Ile Ogbo Osun Centre
| Pos | Team | Pld | W | D | L | GF | GA | GD | Pts |
|---|---|---|---|---|---|---|---|---|---|
| 1 | Ejigbo FC | 8 | 7 | 0 | 1 | 13 | 7 | +6 | 21 |
| 2 | All Stars FC | 8 | 5 | 1 | 2 | 10 | 6 | +4 | 16 |
| 3 | Hammola FC | 7 | 4 | 3 | 0 | 11 | 4 | +7 | 15 |
| 4 | Aayk FC | 7 | 3 | 2 | 2 | 10 | 8 | +2 | 11 |
| 5 | Telu | 7 | 3 | 1 | 3 | 10 | 9 | +1 | 10 |
| 6 | Ijesa Warriors FC | 7 | 3 | 0 | 4 | 7 | 11 | −4 | 9 |
| 7 | Victory Police FC | 6 | 2 | 2 | 2 | 5 | 5 | 0 | 8 |
| 8 | Oriade FC | 7 | 2 | 2 | 3 | 8 | 9 | −1 | 8 |
| 9 | Akoment FC Ede | 6 | 2 | 2 | 2 | 8 | 9 | −1 | 8 |
| 10 | Karamba FC | 7 | 2 | 1 | 4 | 7 | 6 | +1 | 7 |
| 11 | Alaska FC | 7 | 1 | 4 | 2 | 7 | 7 | 0 | 7 |
| 12 | Ase Ridyem FC | 6 | 2 | 0 | 4 | 9 | 13 | −4 | 6 |
| 13 | Ile Ogbo United | 5 | 1 | 3 | 1 | 5 | 4 | +1 | 6 |
| 14 | Fehinty | 7 | 1 | 1 | 5 | 6 | 13 | −7 | 4 |
| 15 | HKM FC | 5 | 1 | 0 | 4 | 4 | 9 | −5 | 3 |

Source: Sofascore

Venue 17 – Jos Centre
| Pos | Team | Pld | W | D | L | GF | GA | GD | Pts |
|---|---|---|---|---|---|---|---|---|---|
| 1 | Vet Rovers FC | 9 | 6 | 3 | 0 | 14 | 3 | +11 | 21 |
| 2 | Mighty Jets Feeders | 8 | 5 | 3 | 0 | 13 | 6 | +7 | 18 |
| 3 | Ben Akwuegbu FC | 9 | 4 | 4 | 1 | 13 | 4 | +9 | 16 |
| 4 | Maichibi United | 8 | 3 | 3 | 2 | 8 | 7 | +1 | 12 |
| 5 | Plateau Jets FC | 9 | 4 | 0 | 5 | 8 | 8 | 0 | 12 |
| 6 | Atharah FA | 8 | 3 | 2 | 3 | 7 | 8 | −1 | 11 |
| 7 | Midlands FC | 9 | 2 | 3 | 4 | 9 | 11 | −2 | 9 |
| 8 | Mafeng FC | 8 | 1 | 4 | 3 | 7 | 12 | −5 | 7 |
| 9 | Global Peace FC | 9 | 1 | 3 | 5 | 6 | 13 | −7 | 6 |
| 10 | Jos Dream Big | 9 | 0 | 3 | 6 | 4 | 17 | −13 | 3 |
| 11 | Deluxe FC | 0 | 0 | 0 | 0 | 0 | 0 | 0 | 0 |

Source: Sofascore

Venue 18 – Kwara 1 Centre
| Pos | Team | Pld | W | D | L | GF | GA | GD | Pts |
|---|---|---|---|---|---|---|---|---|---|
| 1 | Na Royal FC | 7 | 5 | 1 | 1 | 17 | 3 | +14 | 16 |
| 2 | La Planet FA | 7 | 4 | 1 | 2 | 10 | 5 | +5 | 13 |
| 3 | Offa FC | 7 | 3 | 1 | 3 | 12 | 14 | −2 | 10 |
| 4 | Ka'ah | 7 | 2 | 3 | 2 | 7 | 14 | −7 | 9 |
| 5 | Barrier FC | 7 | 3 | 0 | 4 | 8 | 9 | −1 | 9 |
| 6 | Abs FC | 7 | 1 | 4 | 2 | 6 | 7 | −1 | 7 |
| 7 | GAA Akanbi | 7 | 1 | 3 | 3 | 8 | 11 | −3 | 6 |
| 8 | Dohz FC | 7 | 1 | 3 | 3 | 5 | 10 | −5 | 6 |

Source: Sofascore

Venue 19 – Kwara 2 Centre
| Pos | Team | Pld | W | D | L | GF | GA | GD | Pts |
|---|---|---|---|---|---|---|---|---|---|
| 1 | Hop FA | 7 | 5 | 1 | 1 | 16 | 8 | +8 | 16 |
| 2 | Laycon FA | 7 | 5 | 1 | 1 | 13 | 6 | +7 | 16 |
| 3 | Sunrise FA | 6 | 3 | 1 | 2 | 6 | 8 | −2 | 10 |
| 4 | Araba | 8 | 2 | 3 | 3 | 11 | 12 | −1 | 9 |
| 5 | Abray Sports FC | 7 | 2 | 2 | 3 | 11 | 9 | +2 | 8 |
| 6 | KFA FC | 7 | 2 | 1 | 4 | 8 | 14 | −6 | 7 |
| 7 | Kasam FA | 7 | 1 | 3 | 3 | 9 | 16 | −7 | 6 |
| 8 | Unicorn FC | 7 | 1 | 2 | 4 | 11 | 12 | −1 | 5 |
| 9 | Abs FC | 0 | 0 | 0 | 0 | 0 | 0 | 0 | 0 |

Source: Sofascore

Venue 20 – Lafia Centre
| Pos | Team | Pld | W | D | L | GF | GA | GD | Pts |
|---|---|---|---|---|---|---|---|---|---|
| 1 | Zeal Minds FC | 7 | 5 | 2 | 0 | 12 | 2 | +10 | 17 |
| 2 | Wan Agara FC | 7 | 4 | 2 | 1 | 13 | 5 | +8 | 14 |
| 3 | Kogi United FC | 7 | 3 | 2 | 2 | 9 | 5 | +4 | 11 |
| 4 | Amazing Grace | 7 | 2 | 4 | 1 | 14 | 9 | +5 | 10 |
| 5 | Flight FC | 7 | 2 | 1 | 4 | 9 | 13 | −4 | 7 |
| 6 | Sl.14 | 7 | 1 | 3 | 3 | 6 | 10 | −4 | 6 |
| 7 | Confluences Star FC | 7 | 1 | 2 | 4 | 10 | 22 | −12 | 5 |
| 8 | FRSC FC | 7 | 1 | 2 | 4 | 8 | 15 | −7 | 5 |

Source: Sofascore

== Sponsors ==
In 2023 the NLO signed a deal with New Year Mega Lottery

| Period | Sponsor | Brand |
|---|---|---|
| 2024–present | New Year Mega Lottery | New Year Mega Lottery Nationwide League League |
