= Nigeria Football Federation =

Governing body of association football in Nigeria

CAF
- Founded: 21 August 1933 (1945 as NFA)
- Headquarters: Abuja
- FIFA affiliation: 1960
- CAF affiliation: 1959
- President: Vacant
- Vice-President: Felix Anyansi-Agwu
- Website: www.thenff.com

The Nigeria Football Federation (known as Nigeria Football Association until 2008) is Nigeria's football governing body. It was formally launched in 1945 and formed the first Nigerian national football team in 1949. It joined CAF in 1959 and FIFA in 1960. The NFF headquarters is located in the city of Abuja.

As of 2008 it organises three leagues: The Nigerian Premier League, the Amateur League and the Women's League, and five competitions, including the Federation Cup and Women's Cup. The next Election is slated for 2022.

== Formation dispute ==
Author and Nigerian football historian Kunle Solaja has found evidence that the Nigerian Football Federation could have been formed in 1933 and not 1945 as previously thought.

Solaja cited two Nigerian Daily Times' articles dated from 21 July and 21 August 1933. The first was an article called titled "Proposed Football Association", the latter was an advert invited people to attend an open meeting.

Nigerian Football Association
The inaugural meeting of the above will be held at Health Office, Broad Street, at 7 pm tonight to discuss the formation of the Association and to pass its Rules. All interested in Football are invited to attend

— Nigerian Daily Times, 21 August 1933

The FA's Public Affairs Officer David Berber, revealed that the FA held evidence of the Nigerian Football Federation existing before 1945: "I can advise that the name of the Nigeria Football Association first appeared in the ‘FA Handbook’ for the season 1938–1939, in the list of our affiliated associations. The NFA Secretary at that time was F.B Mulford, with a Lagos address."

== 2014 dispute ==
On 9 July 2014, upon the 2014 FIFA World Cup, Nigeria was suspended from FIFA, briefly, According to a statement from FIFA the World soccer’s ruling body had previously sent a letter to the Nigeria Football Federation (NFF) in which it expressed its concerns after the NFF received court proceedings which hindered its president from running the African country’s soccer affairs.

However Nigeria was back for the 2014 FIFA U-20 Women's World Cup.

In September, another dispute risked leading to Nigeria missing qualifying for 2015 Africa Cup of Nations, but problems were resolved, and Nigeria went on to the 2014 African Women's Championship.

== Nigeria Football Federation Bill ==
A Bill for an Act to repeal the Nigeria Football Association Act and endorse the Nigeria Football Federation Act ("NFF Act") has been passed by the National Assembly of Nigeria in 2019. It remains for President Muhammadu Buhari’s assent for the Bill to become law.

== Reservations on the NFF Bill ==
The public consensus favors the passage of the Bill, as it is believed will become what Nigeria's Football Federation require to effectively grow football in the country. However, legal opinion queried the constitutionality, based on the Constitution of Nigeria as it regards to sports and sports administration of which the National Assembly has no legislative powers to pass such laws. Further still if the Bill becomes Law by the President's assent, Nigeria Football Federation will become a statutory body which will, therefore, contravene one of the FIFA statutes for their member organizations.

== Corruption and Development of the NFF ==
Corruption has been the bane of Nigerian public and private life for many years. Corruption has eaten so deeply into the fabric of Nigerian culture that it has been embraced as a way of life, it is an undeniable reality. In Nigeria, corruption has taken on a new sense, with only those who have been caught in the act of theft being labeled as corrupt. Corruption is perpetuated in the sports industry, especially in football, by the awarding of contracts, the hiring of coaches, the use of referees on the field of play, the election of board members, and the selection of players, among other things. Much of this revolves around the Nigerian Football Federation (NFF), formerly the Nigerian Football Association (NFA), which is a federal government body under the sports ministry tasked with the creation of football in Nigeria. According to stakeholders in the football industry, corruption has wreaked havoc on the advancement of the sport in Nigeria. It has been so pervasive that former Nigerian Senate President David Mark described the Nigeria Football Federation as the most corrupt government agency in the country during one of house's sittings in 2013. No one knows exactly when football began in Nigeria, but one thing is certain: Nigerians began playing the game for fun and relaxation long before the Nigeria Football Association was established (NFA). It is commonly thought that former British colonial masters introduced football to Nigeria as early as 1914, after Lord Lugard's amalgamation of Northern and Southern Nigeria.

== Presidents ==
- (England) Pa Mulford (1945–1947)
- (England) Pius Quist (Anthony) (1947–1948)
- (England) D.H. Holley (1949–1950)
- (England) P. Harvey (1951–1953)
- (England) N. Miller (1954–1956)
- (England) Dennis J. Slattery (1957–1958)
- (England) R.B. Allen (1959–1960)
- (Nigeria) Godfrey Amachree (1960–1961)
- (Nigeria) F. A. S. Ogunmuyiwa (1961–1962)
- (Nigeria) Louis Edet May (1962–1963)
- (Nigeria) M.S. Adawale (Acting) (1963–1963)
- (Nigeria) A.B. Osula (Acting) (1963–1963)
- (Nigeria) Francis Giwa-Osagie (1964–1964)
- (Nigeria) Ishola Bajulaiye (1965–1965)
- (Nigeria) Chuba Ikpeazu (1965–1967)
- (Nigeria) Godfrey Amachree (1967–1970)
- (Nigeria) Kevin Lawson (Col.) (1971–1971)
- (Nigeria) Edwin Kentebbe (Comdr.) (1971–1972)
- (Nigeria) Ademola Adeoba (Acting) (1972–1972)
- (Nigeria) Emmanuel Sotomi (Brig.) (1973–1973)
- (Nigeria) Sunday Dankaro (1974–1980)
- (Nigeria) Mike Okwechime (Col.) (1981–May 1982)
- (Nigeria) Edwin Kentebbe (Comdr.) 1982–1983
- (Nigeria) Tony Ikazoboh (1983–1987)
- (Nigeria) John Obakpolor (1987–1988)
- (Nigeria) Chuba Ikpeazu (1988–1989)
- (Nigeria) Efiom Okon (Interim) (1989)
- (Nigeria) Tony Ikazoboh (1989)
- (Nigeria) Yusuf Ali (1990–1991)
- (Nigeria) Efiom Okon (1991–1992)
- (Nigeria) Amos Adamu (1992–1993)
- (Nigeria) Emeka Omeruah (1993–1997)
- (Nigeria) Abdulmumini Aminu (1997–1999)
- (Nigeria) Kojo Williams (1999)
- (Nigeria) Dominic Oneya (1999–2002)
- (Nigeria) Ibrahim Galadima (2002–2006)
- (Nigeria) Sani Lulu (2006–2010)
- (Nigeria) Aminu Maigari (2010–2014)
- (Nigeria) Amaju Pinnick (2014‒2022)
- (Nigeria) Ibrahim M. Gusau (2022‒2026)

== Competitions ==
=== Current title holders ===
Competition	Year	Champions	Title	Runners-up	Next edition
Men's
Senior
Nigerian Professional Football League	2024–25	Remo Stars	1st	Rivers United	2025–26
Nigeria National League	2024–25	Warri Wolves	2nd	Wikki Tourists	2025–26
Nigeria Nationwide League					
Youth
N-Youth League Cup	2024–25	Kwara United U-19	1st	Atlantic Business U-19	2025–26
Women's
Senior
NWFL Premiership	2024-25	Bayelsa Queens	6th	Nasarawa Amazons	2025–26
