= Nigeria Amateur League Division Two =

Nigerian Nationwide League Division Two
- Founded: 2001
- Country: Nigeria
- Confederation: CAF
- Number of clubs: 52
- Level on pyramid: 4
- Promotion to: Nigeria Nationwide League
- Relegation to: Nigerian Nationwide League Division Three
- Domestic cup: Nigerian FA Cup
- Website: nigerianationwideleague.com

The Nigerian Nationwide League Division Two (2) is the fourth level of club football in Nigeria, and the middle of the three Nationwide league divisions. It is divided into eight groups by geography with five to eight teams each. Every year, up to eight teams (the section champions) are promoted to the Nationwide Division One.
