= 2018 Nigeria Women Premier League =

Nigeria Women Premier League
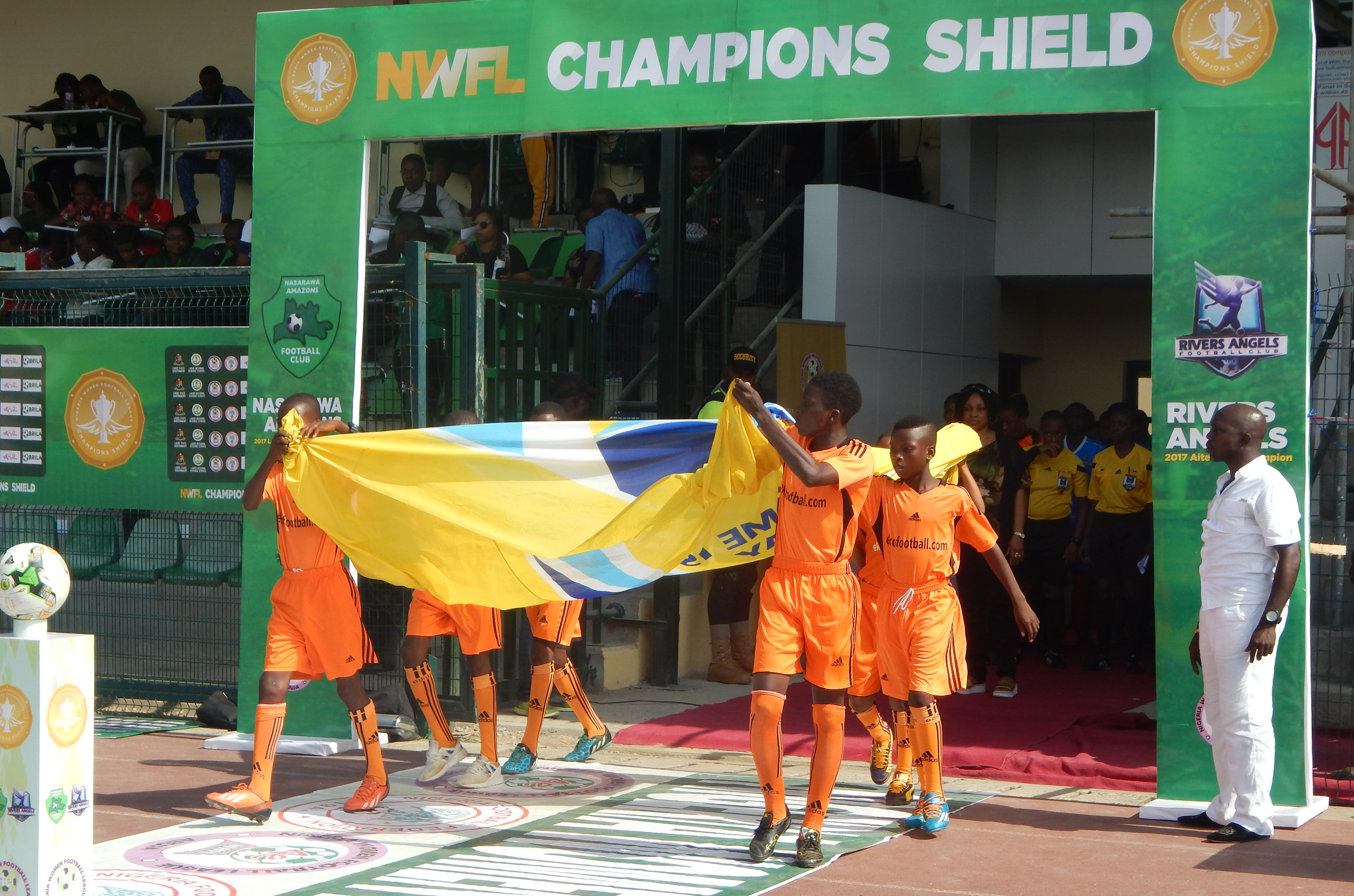
- NWFL Champions Shield 2018
- Season: 2018
- Champions: Bayelsa Queens
- Top goalscorer: Anam Imo

The 2018 Nigeria Women Premier League began on April 7 in a game featuring defending champions Nasarawa Amazons from Nasarawa State and FC Robo of Lagos State. The date was decided following a congress held in Ikeja on March 3. Prior to the game, a maiden super cup named the NWFL Champions Shield match was played between Aiteo Cup winners, Rivers Angels and Nasarawa Amazons to officially open the new season. At the end of the 2017 season, Sure Babes of Ilorin, Jokodolu Babes of Ogbomosho and Taraba Queens of Taraba State were promoted to compete in the elite division pending registration procedures, while Saadatu Amazons of Minna and Heartland Queens of Owerri were relegated to the pro league. In May 2018, the league went on a mid-season break due to the 2018 FIFA World Cup, this was further elongated after an emerging NFF leadership crisis. In August 2018, it was announced that the remaining games of the league will commence September 12.

== Format ==
The teams are divided into two groups of eight teams, of which the top two teams from each group will play in a super 4 mini-tournament tagged the NWPL Super 4 at the end of the season to determine the overall winner of the league. Each team is to play every team in her group twice on a home and away basis. The last placed teams in each group will be relegated to the pro league (division 2).

== Teams ==
Group	Team	Location	Ground	2017 rank	Head coach
Group A
Group A	Edo Queens	Edo State		6th in 1^{b}	Ken Aigbe
Group A	Heartland Queens (Note: Heartland Queens were originally relegated but took the place of Taraba Queens)	Owerri		Relegated; 7th in 1^{a}	Uche Eucharia
Group A	Confluence Queens	Kogi State		4th in 1^{b}	Maja Nayashi
Group A	Rivers Angels	Rivers State		2nd in 1^{a}	Edwin Okon
Group A	Sure Babes	Ilorin		Promoted; 1st in div 2^{b}	Abdullah Ganiyu
Group A	Delta Queens	Delta State		1st in 1^{b}	Clifford Chukwuma
Group A	Bayelsa Queens	Bayelsa State		1st in 1^{a}	Michael Ekpeyong
Group A	Ibom Angels	Uyo		4th in 1^{a}	Whyte Ogbonda
Group B
Group B	Jokodolu Babes	Ogbomosho		Promoted; 2nd in div 2^{b}	Ahmed Mohammed
Group B	FC Robo	Lagos		5th in 1^{a}	Emmanuel Osahon
Group B	Pelican Stars	Calabar		7th in 1^{b}	Adat Egan
Group B	Sunshine Queens	Akure		3rd in 1^{a}	Mathew Wemimo
Group B	Osun Babes	Osogbo		5th in 1^{b}	Liadi Bashiru
Group B	Nasarawa Amazons	Nasarawa State		2nd in 1^{b}	Christopher Danjuma
Group B	Adamawa Queens	Adamawa State		3rd in 1^{b}	Baba Buba
Group B	Abia Angels	Abia State		6th in 1^{a}	Ann Chiejine

== Memorable moments ==
In a week 8 fixture, FC Robo defeated Abia Angels with Nigerian international, Rasheedat Ajibade scoring 4 goals in the game.

== Nigeria Women Pro League - Division 2 ==
The division two teams seeking to gain promotion ahead of the 2019 Nigeria Women Premier League were Moje Queens of Kwara State, Police Machine of Akwa Ibom, Saadatu Amazons of Minna, Gift of Life, Invincible Angels of Gboko, Dream Stars of Lagos and Faith Hill Queens. In November 2018, it was confirmed that Dream Stars and Invincible Angels will be promoted to the elite division.

== Top scorers ==
As of end of season

Rank	Player	Team	Goals
1	Anam Imo	Nasarawa Amazons	8
2	Anjor Mary	Osun Babes	6
3	Rasheedat Ajibade	FC Robo	5
3	Alice Ogebe	Rivers Angels	5
3	Brigitte Omboudou	Delta Queens	5
3	Ikhekhua Oghenebrume	Delta Queens	5
3	Tina Oyatelemhi	Sunshine Queens	5
8	Reuben Charity	Ibom Angels; Bayelsa Queens	4
