= 2019 Nigeria Women Premier League =

2019 season of top-flight Nigerian women's football league

Nigeria Women Premier League
- Season: 2019
- Champions: Rivers Angels
- Matches: 48
- Goals: 103 (2.15 per match)

The 2019 Nigeria Women Premier League began July 24, 2019. The league was earlier scheduled to start in February, but due to logistic reasons and commencement of other competitions, it was postponed to March, May then later July. Prior to the start of the league, a congress was held in Abuja on June 27, with representatives from Nigeria Football Federation. Due to failure of some teams to pay their indemnities, the agreed date at the congress was shifted from July 17 to July 24.

At the end of the 2018 Nigeria Women Premier League, Pelican Stars and Sure Babes were relegated to the lower division while Dream Stars Ladies and Invincible Angels gained promotion to the League. Bayelsa Queens returns as defending champions, while Kaduna Queens bought the slot of Jokodolu Babes to compete in the elite division.

At the end of the regular season, Confluence Queens, Bayelsa Queens, Rivers Angels and Adamawa Queens topped their group, thereby qualifying for the super 4 competition to determine the overall winner of the league, while Osun Babes, Dream Stars Ladies, Kaduna Queens and Invincible Angels proceed to relegation playoffs.

== Format ==
For the 2019 season, an abridged league format of four groups was adopted with four teams in each group. The top team in each of the four groups will play a super four mini-tournament at the end of the league to determine the overall winner of the league. The last placed team in each group will engage in a playoff to determine the two teams that will be relegated to the lower division.

== Major transfers ==
The league saw the arrival of two Gambian internationals, Penda Bah and Isatou Jallow joining Rivers Angels and Dream Stars Ladies (with Jallow later joining Angels) respectively. Other major transfers included the arrival of 2018 second top scorer, Anjor Major to league winners, Bayelsa Queens. Rofiat Sule, who was the top scorer during the 2016 and 2017 season also moved from Rivers Angels to Bayelsa Queens in a deal that is considered as the biggest in the history of Nigerian women club football. In August 2019, former captain of Ghana women's national under-20 football team, Grace Adams signed a year deal with Rivers Angels from a team in the United States.

== Non-Nigerian players during 2019 season ==
| Player | Club | Nationality |
|---|---|---|
| Grace Adams | Rivers Angels | Ghana |
| Zogo Mete | Heartland Queens | Cameroon |
| Penda Bah | Rivers Angels | Gambia |
| Carine Yoh | Sunshine Queens | Cameroon |
| Ajieh Vivian | Delta Queens | Ghana |
| Ossol Kevine | Abia Angels | Cameroon |
| Tantoh Melvis | Delta Queens | Cameroon |
| Bakendji Reine | Abia Angels | Cameroon |
| Patience Adjetey | Delta Queens | Ghana |
| Isatou Jallow | Rivers Angels | Gambia |
| Bilong Maxi | Abia Angels | Cameroon |

== Finals table ==
=== Group A ===
| Pos | Team | Pld | W | D | L | GF | GA | GD | Pts | Qualification |
|---|---|---|---|---|---|---|---|---|---|---|
| 1 | Rivers Angels (Q) | 6 | 4 | 1 | 1 | 6 | 3 | +3 | 13 | Qualification to the Super 4 |
| 2 | FC Robo | 6 | 3 | 2 | 1 | 8 | 5 | +3 | 11 | |
| 3 | Delta Queens | 6 | 2 | 2 | 2 | 5 | 4 | +1 | 8 | |
| 4 | Osun Babes (R) | 6 | 0 | 1 | 5 | 4 | 11 | −7 | 1 | Qualification to the Relegation play-offs |

Source: The NWFL
Rules for classification: 1) points; 2) goal difference; 3) number of goals scored.
(Q) Qualified for the phase indicated; (R) Relegated

=== Group B ===
| Pos | Team | Pld | W | D | L | GF | GA | GD | Pts | Qualification |
|---|---|---|---|---|---|---|---|---|---|---|
| 1 | Adamawa Queens (Q) | 6 | 3 | 3 | 0 | 4 | 1 | +3 | 12 | Qualification to the Super 4 |
| 2 | Edo Queens | 6 | 3 | 1 | 2 | 7 | 5 | +2 | 10 | |
| 3 | Heartland Queens | 6 | 2 | 1 | 3 | 6 | 9 | −3 | 7 | |
| 4 | Dream Stars Ladies F.C. (R) | 6 | 1 | 1 | 4 | 5 | 7 | −2 | 4 | Qualification to the Relegation play-offs |

Source: The NWFL
Rules for classification: 1) points; 2) goal difference; 3) number of goals scored
(Q) Qualified for the phase indicated; (R) Relegated

=== Group C ===
| Pos | Team | Pld | W | D | L | GF | GA | GD | Pts | Qualification |
|---|---|---|---|---|---|---|---|---|---|---|
| 1 | Bayelsa Queens (Q) | 6 | 3 | 2 | 1 | 9 | 5 | +4 | 11 | Qualification to the Super 4 |
| 2 | Sunshine Queens | 6 | 3 | 2 | 1 | 7 | 4 | +3 | 11 | |
| 3 | Nasarawa Amazons | 6 | 1 | 3 | 2 | 10 | 8 | +2 | 6 | |
| 4 | Kaduna Queens (Note: Kaduna Queens bought the slot of Jokodolu Babes) (R) | 6 | 1 | 1 | 4 | 4 | 13 | −9 | 4 | Qualification to the Relegation play-offs |

Source: The NWFL
Rules for classification: 1) points; 2) goal difference; 3) number of goals scored
(Q) Qualified for the phase indicated; (R) Relegated

=== Group D ===
| Pos | Team | Pld | W | D | L | GF | GA | GD | Pts | Qualification |
|---|---|---|---|---|---|---|---|---|---|---|
| 1 | Confluence Queens (Q) | 6 | 3 | 2 | 1 | 10 | 5 | +5 | 11 | Qualification to the Super 4 |
| 2 | Abia Angels | 6 | 3 | 1 | 2 | 5 | 6 | −1 | 10 | |
| 3 | Ibom Angels | 6 | 3 | 0 | 3 | 7 | 5 | +2 | 9 | |
| 4 | Invincible Angels (R) | 6 | 1 | 1 | 4 | 5 | 11 | −6 | 4 | Qualification to the Relegation play-offs |

Source: The NWFL
Rules for classification: 1) points; 2) goal difference; 3) number of goals scored
(Q) Qualified for the phase indicated; (R) Relegated

== Play-off stages ==
=== Relegation play-offs ===
2 October 2019

| Osun Babes | 1–1 | Kaduna Queens |
|---|---|---|
| Iloduba 51' (pen.) | Report | Anita |
Penalties
| | 4–3 |

FIFA Goal Project Pitch (Package B), Abuja
2 October 2019

| DreamStar FC Ladies | 1–1 | Invincible Angels |
|---|---|---|
| Nwaogu 21' | Report | Bashiru 84' |
Penalties
| | 4–3 |

FIFA Goal Project Pitch (Package B), Abuja
- Kaduna Queens and Invincible Angels were relegated to the Pro-league.

=== Super 4 ===
==== Semi-finals ====
1 November 2019

| Adamawa Queens | 0–2 | Confluence Queens |
|---|---|---|
| | Report | Usang 3', 26' |

Agege Stadium, Lagos

| Bayelsa Queens | 0–0 | Rivers Angels |
|---|---|---|
| | Report |
Penalties
| | 3–4 |

Agege Stadium, Lagos
- Confluence Queens and Rivers Angels qualified to the Final.

==== Third place match ====
3 November 2019

| Adamawa Queens | 0–4 | Bayelsa Queens |
|---|---|---|
| | Report | Sule 30'; Biahwo 56'; Jerry 90+2' |

Agege Stadium, Lagos

==== Final ====
3 November 2019

| Rivers Angels | 1–0 | Confluence Queens |
|---|---|---|
| Nku 3' (pen.) | Report |

Agege Stadium, Lagos

2019 Nigeria Women Premier League winners

6th title

== Nigeria Women Pro-league play-offs ==
Four teams qualified for the promotion playoffs; Olori Babes, Pelican Stars, Police Female Machine, Moje Queens. The four teams would play each other once in a round robin tournament, the two highest ranked teams shall be promoted to the 2020 Nigeria Women Premier League.

All matches were played at the Confluence Stadium in Lokoja.

| Pos | Team | Pld | W | D | L | GF | GA | GD | Pts | Qualification |
|---|---|---|---|---|---|---|---|---|---|---|
| 1 | Olori Babes FC (P) | 3 | 3 | 0 | 0 | 5 | 1 | +4 | 9 | Promotion to the 2020 Nigeria Women Premier League |
| 2 | Pelican Stars (P) | 3 | 2 | 0 | 1 | 8 | 3 | +5 | 6 | Promotion to the 2020 Nigeria Women Premier League |
| 3 | Police Female Machine FC | 3 | 1 | 0 | 2 | 4 | 8 | −4 | 3 | |
| 4 | Moje Queens | 3 | 0 | 0 | 3 | 2 | 7 | −5 | 0 | |

Source: The NWFL
Rules for classification: 1) points; 2) goal difference; 3) number of goals scored
(P) Promoted

Round 1

8 October 2019

| Pelican Stars | 4–1 | Police Female Machine FC |

Confluence Stadium, Lokoja
8 October 2019

| Olori Babes FC | 1–0 | Moje Queens |

Confluence Stadium, Lokoja

Round 2

9 October 2019

| Olori Babes FC | 2–1 | Pelican Stars |

Confluence Stadium, Lokoja
9 October 2019

| Police Female Machine FC | 3–2 | Moje Queens |

Confluence Stadium, Lokoja

Round 3

11 October 2019

| Moje Queens | 0–3 | Pelican Stars |

Confluence Stadium, Lokoja
11 October 2019

| Police Female Machine FC | 0–2 | Olori Babes FC |

Confluence Stadium, Lokoja
