= Amarachi Okoronkwo =

Nigerian footballer

Personal information
- Full name: Amarachi Grace Okoronkwo
- Date of birth: 12 December 1992 (age 33)
- Height: 1.63 m (5 ft 4 in)
- Position: Midfielder

Team information
- Current team: Nasarawa Amazons
- Number: 33

Senior career*
Years	Team	Apps	(Gls)
2012–2014	Kokkola F10	46	(7)
2014-	Nasarawa Amazons		

International career
2010-	Nigeria		
- * Club domestic league appearances and goals

Amarachi Grace Okoronkwo // (born 12 December 1992) is a Nigerian footballer who currently plays for Nasarawa Amazons in the Nigerian Women Premier League and the Nigeria women's national football team. She previously played for Kokkola F10 in Finland's Naisten Liiga.

== Career ==
=== Club career ===
For her role in leading Nasarawa Amazons to win the 2017 Nigeria Women Premier League, Okoronkwo was among the four players nominated as the best NWPL player of the year, but lost the award to Rasheedat Ajibade. In May 2018, she was nominated as the best player in the 2017 Nigeria Women Premier League at Nigeria Pitch Awards, but also lost to Ajibade.

=== International ===
Okoronkwo represented Nigeria at 2010 African Women's Championship. She was called up for a friendly game against Germany as preparation for Nigeria's participation in the FIFA Women's World Cup.

In 2018, Okoronkwo featured for Nigeria at 2018 WAFU Women's Cup, winning the bronze medal for the team. She also featured for the Nigeria women's national football team at the 2018 Africa Women Cup of Nations and won the tournament with the team.

== Honours ==
- 2010 African Women's Championship – winners
- 2018 WAFU Women's Cup – third place
- 2017 Nigeria Women Premier League – winners
- 2018 Africa Women Cup of Nations- winners
