= Chioma Wogu =

Nigerian footballer (born 1999)

Success Chioma Wogu
Personal information
- Full name: Success Chioma Wogu
- Date of birth: 28 January 1999 (age 27)
- Place of birth: Ibadan, Nigeria
- Position: Forward

Team information
- Current team: Yanga Princess

Senior career*
Years	Team	Apps	(Gls)
	Confluence Queens		(6)
2016–2020	Rivers Angels		
2020–2022	FC Minsk	8	(4)
2022	Yanga Princess		

International career^{‡}
2016-	Nigeria	1	(0)
- * Club domestic league appearances and goals ‡ National team caps and goals as of 13:20, 13 June 2019 (UTC)

Success Chioma Wogu (born 28 January 1999) is a Nigerian footballer who plays for Yanga Princess in the Tanzanian Women's Premier League. She previously played for FC Minsk in the Belarusian Premier League. She also features for Nigeria women's national football team at national level. She made her debut appearance at the Africa Women Cup of Nations at age 17.

== Career ==
Wogu was top scorer (six goals) for Confluence Queens in the 2014 Nigeria Women Premier League season, which was her first season in the league. In a 2017 Nigeria Women Premier League game between Rivers Angels and Heartland Queens, Wogu scored a goal to enable Angels retain the top position. After showing fine form at home, Wogu missed chances that resulted to the end of Rivers Angels ten games home winning streak.

Despite being part of the Nigeria qualification games for the 2014 African Women's Championship, Wogu was dropped by head coach, Edwin Okon in the final list. However, in the 2016 edition, she made the squad, contributing an assist from the bench in her first game against Mali.
