= Bolaji Olamide =

Nigerian football player

Personal information
- Full name: Bolaji Titilayo Olamide
- Date of birth: 27 November 2003 (age 22)
- Place of birth: Nigeria
- Height: 1.65 m (5 ft 5 in)
- Position: Forward

Team information
- Current team: Remo Stars Ladies
- Number: 13

Senior career*
Years	Team	Apps	(Gls)
2019–2023	Osun Babes		
2023–2025	Sunshine Queens		
2025–	Remo Stars Ladies	19	(15)

International career^{‡}
2020	Nigeria U17		
2024–2025	Nigeria	1	(0)
- * Club domestic league appearances and goals as of 31 July 2025 ‡ National team caps and goals as of 31 July 2025

Bolaji Titilayo Olamide (born 27 November 2003) is a Nigerian professional footballer who plays as a forward for Remo Stars Ladies and the Nigeria Women's national team. Olamide is the reigning Golden Boot winner in the NWFL Premiership.

== Club career ==
Olamide played for Osun Babes and Sunshine Queens, where she transitioned from a midfielder to a forward, before joining Remo Stars Ladies in 2025.

On 15 January 2025, she scored her first goal for Remo Stars Ladies on her league debut, in a 3–1 victory over Confluence Queens. She scored in the next six games, including braces against Heartland Queens and Abia Angels, bringing her tally to 9 goals in 7 games.

Olamide was named NWFL Player of the Week on Matchday 5 and won two consecutive Player of the Month awards between January and February 2025.

On 16 April 2025, she scored an 88th-minute equaliser against Heartland Queens at the Dan Anyiam Stadium in Owerri to register her 10th goal of the campaign, ending a four-game goal drought. She finished the regular season with 14 goals in 14 games, the highest tally in the league, as Remo Stars Ladies qualified for the NWFL Super Six.

On 13 May 2025, Olamide scored the only goal against Naija Ratels as Remo Stars Ladies won their second consecutive game in the Super Six, which sent them top of the table.

She won the Top Scorer award by the end of the season.

== International career ==
Olamide played for the Nigeria Women's U-17 team in 2020. On 14 March 2020, she was sent off on the stroke of halftime against Guinea, during the FIFA U-17 Women's World Cup qualifiers. Nigeria won the game 5-1 at the Agege Stadium, advancing 11-2 on aggregate. The tournament was later canceled due to the COVID-19 pandemic.

On 20 October 2024, Olamide received her first call-up to the Nigeria Women's Senior national team for the friendlies against Algeria. On 20 May 2025, she was called up against for the friendlies against Cameroon. On 3 June 2025, she made her debut, coming on as a second half substitute. She didn't make the final squad list for the Women's Africa Cup of Nations.
