= 2024–25 NWFL Premiership =

- Season: 2024–25
- Dates: 15 January – 17 May
- Champions: Bayelsa Queens (6th title)
- Relegated: Confluence Queens; Benue Queens
- CAF Women's Champions League: Bayelsa Queens
- Matches: 127
- Goals: 307 (2.42 per match)
- Top goalscorer: Bolaji Olamide (15 goals)
- Biggest home win: Robo Queens 8–1 Benue Queens (26 March 2025)
- Biggest away win: Benue Queens 1–5 Robo Queens (15 January 2025); Benue Queens 1–5 Bayelsa Queens (29 January 2025)
- Longest unbeaten run: Bayelsa Queens (14 matches)
- All statistics correct as of 17 May 2025.

The 2024–25 NWFL Premiership is the 35th season of the women's football top-level league in Nigeria. The season commenced on 15 January 2025. On 17 May, Bayelsa Queens won their sixth title after finishing top of the Super Six table.

Edo Queens are the defending champions.

== Teams ==
=== Team changes ===
Ibom Angels and Honey Badgers were promoted, the latter making its debut after being bought and renamed Benue Queens. They replaced the two relegated teams from the previous season.

Promoted from 2024–2025 NWFL Championship	Relegated from 2023–2024 NWFL Premiership
Ibom Angels; Benue Queens	Royal Queens; Sunshine Queens

=== Stadiums and locations ===
Clubs	Stadium	City
Adamawa Queens	Pantami Stadium	Yola
Abia Angels	Umuahia Township Stadium	Umuahia
Bayelsa Queens	Samson Siasia Sports Stadium	Yenagoa
Benue Queens	Lafia City Stadium (Note: Benue Queens play from Lafia City Stadium, Lafia as their home stadium, Aper Aku Stadium, Makurdi is under renovation.)	Makurdi
Confluence Queens	Prince Abubakar Audu University Stadium, Anyigba (Note: Confluence Queens are to play their home games at Prince Abubakar Audu University Stadium, Anyigba as their regular home stadium, Confluence Stadium, Lokoja to not meet requirements.)	Lokoja
Dannaz Ladies	Onikan Stadium	Lagos
Delta Queens	Stephen Keshi Stadium	Asaba
Edo Queens	Samuel Ogbemudia Stadium	Benin City
Ekiti Queens	Oluyemi Kayode Stadium; Kwara State Stadium (Note: Ekiti Queens played some of their home games at Kwara State Stadium, Ilorin as their regular home stadium Oluyemi Kayode Stadium was undergoing rehabilitation later in the season.)	Ado-Ekiti
Heartland Queens	Dan Anyiam Stadium	Owerri
Ibom Angels	Uyo Township Stadium	Uyo
Naija Ratels	Bwari Stadium	Abuja
Nasarawa Amazons	Lafia City Stadium	Lafia
Remo Stars Ladies	Remo Stars Stadium	Ikenne
Rivers Angels	Adokiye Amiesimaka Stadium	Port Harcourt
Robo Queens	Onikan Stadium	Lagos

== Regular season ==
=== Group A ===
==== Table ====
Pos	Team	Pld	W	D	L	GF	GA	GD	Pts	Qualification
1	Edo Queens	14	11	2	1	27	6	+21	35	Championship round
2	Remo Stars Ladies	14	9	3	2	28	8	+20	30	Championship round
3	Nasarawa Amazons	14	9	1	4	21	13	+8	28	
4	Abia Angels	14	7	2	5	18	15	+3	23	
5	Ekiti Queens	14	4	2	8	9	14	−5	14	
6	Heartland Queens	14	3	3	8	9	16	−7	12	
7	Dannaz Ladies	14	2	4	8	7	24	−17	10	
8	Confluence Queens	14	2	1	11	3	26	−23	7	

Source: TheNWFL

==== Results ====
Home \ Away	ABA	CON	DAN	EDO	EKI	HEA	NAS	REM
Abia Angels		3–0	2–0	1–2	1–0	1–0	3–0	2–2
Confluence Queens	0–1		0–0	0–2	1–0	1–0	0–1	1–3
Dannaz Ladies	1–4	2–0		1–1	1–1	1–0	0–3	0–2
Edo Queens	5–0	2–0	3–1		3–0	2–0	2–0	1–1
Ekiti Queens	1–0	2–0	2–0	0–1		1–0	2–2	0–1
Heartland Queens	0–0	3–0	0–0	1–2	1–0		2–1	1–1
Nasarawa Amazons	2–0	5–0	1–0	1–0	2–0	2–0		1–0
Remo Stars Ladies	2–0	2–0	5–0	0–1	1–0	4–1	4–1	

Source: TheNWFL
Legend: Blue = home team win; Yellow = draw; Red = away team win.

=== Group B ===
==== Table ====
Pos	Team	Pld	W	D	L	GF	GA	GD	Pts	Qualification
1	Bayelsa Queens	14	10	4	0	26	5	+21	34	Championship round
2	Rivers Angels	14	10	2	2	30	13	+17	32	Championship round
3	Naija Ratels	15	6	5	4	19	14	+5	23	
4	Robo Queens	14	7	1	6	31	24	+7	22	
5	Ibom Angels	14	5	1	8	13	18	−5	16	
6	Delta Queens	13	4	2	7	12	16	−4	14	
7	Adamawa Queens	14	3	3	8	16	27	−11	12	
8	Benue Queens	14	1	2	11	10	40	−30	5	

Source: TheNWFL

==== Results ====
Home \ Away	ADA	BAY	BEN	DEL	IBM	RAT	RIV	ROB
Adamawa Queens		1–1	2–0	3–0	3–1	1–1	1–2	1–3
Bayelsa Queens	3–0		2–0	1–0	3–0	2–1	1–0	3–0
Benue Queens	2–2	1–5		1–1	1–0	0–4	0–2	1–5
Delta Queens	1–0	0–1	2–0		1–0	0–2	1–2	4–1
Ibom Angels	3–1	0–0	2–1	1–0		2–1	0–1	1–0
Naija Ratels	2–0	0–0	1–0	1–1	2–1		1–1	1–0
Rivers Angels	6–0	1–1	4–2	3–0	2–1	2–0		4–2
Robo Queens	2–1	1–3	8–1	2–1	2–1	2–2	3–0	

Source: TheNWFL
Legend: Blue = home team win; Yellow = draw; Red = away team win.

== Championship round ==
A championship round, known as the Super Six, involving the top three teams from the two groups is held to determine the league champion. It ran from 8–17 May. All matches will be played at Remo Stars Stadium in Ikenne.

Pos	Team	Pld	W	D	L	GF	GA	GD	Pts	Qualification
1	Bayelsa Queens	5	3	1	1	8	3	+5	10	Champions/CAF WCL
2	Nasarawa Amazons	5	2	3	0	5	3	+2	9	
3	Edo Queens	5	2	2	1	4	2	+2	8	
4	Rivers Angels	5	2	1	2	6	5	+1	7	
5	Remo Stars Ladies	5	2	1	2	3	4	−1	7	
6	Naija Ratels	5	0	0	5	2	11	−9	0	

Source: TheNWFL

Home \ Away	BAY	EDO	NAS	RAT	REM	RIV
Bayelsa Queens				4–1	2–0	1–0
Edo Queens	1–0				0–1	
Nasarawa Amazons	1–1	0–0				2–1
Naija Ratels		0–2	1–2			
Remo Stars Ladies			0–0	1–0		1–2
Rivers Angels		1–1		2–0		

Source: TheNWFL
Legend: Blue = home team win; Yellow = draw; Red = away team win.

== Top scorers ==
As of 17 May 2025

Rank	Player	Club	Goals
1	(Nigeria) Bolaji Olamide	Remo Stars Ladies	15
2	(Nigeria) Akekoromwen Janet	Nasarawa Amazons	13
3	(Nigeria) Offor Mary	Rivers Angels	11
4	(Nigeria) Opeyemi Ajakaye	Robo Queens	9
5	(Nigeria) Bashiru Kafayat	Remo Stars Ladies	8
5	(Nigeria) Lucky Mary	Abia Queens	8
7	(Nigeria) Emem Essien	Edo Queens	7
7	(Nigeria) Yahaya Mariam	Robo Queens	7

== Season's awards ==
Award	Winner	Club
League Topscorer	(Nigeria) Bolaji Olamide	Remo Stars Ladies
Most Valuable Player	(Nigeria) Akekoromwen Janet	Nasarawa Amazons
