= Charity Reuben =

Nigerian footballer (soccer player)

Personal information
- Full name: Charity Chetachukwu Reuben
- Date of birth: 25 December 2000 (age 25)
- Height: 1.77 m (5 ft 10 in)
- Position: Striker

Team information
- Current team: Bayelsa Queens

Youth career
- Rivers Angels

Senior career*
| Years | Team | Apps | (Gls) |
| 2016–2018 | Ibom Angels | | (8) |
| 2018–2019 | Bayelsa Queens | | |
| 2019 | BIIK Kazygurt | | (5) |
| 2019–2024 | Bayelsa Queens | 13 | (7) |
| 2024– | Al Ahly Women | 4 | (5) |

International career
| 2016 | Nigeria U20 | | |
- * Club domestic league appearances and goals

Charity Chetachukwu Reuben (born 25 December 2000) is a Nigerian footballer, who plays for Al Ahly Women. She previously represented Ibom Angels in the Nigeria Women Premier League, and Nigeria women's national under-20 football team. For the 2017 Nigeria Women Premier League, she scored eight goals, the most by any player in the league.

== Career ==
After joining from Rivers Angels in 2015, Reuben scored six goals during the 2016 Nigeria Women Premier League. Charity featured for Nigeria at the 2016 FIFA U-20 Women's World Cup. In February 2018, she was nominated by the Nigeria Football Federation for the 2017 Women Player of the Year. In May 2018, she was nominated as the best player in the 2017 Nigeria Women Premier League at Nigeria Pitch Awards, but the award was eventually given to Rasheedat Ajibade. Reuben has played for Bayelsa Queens football club since 2019.
