= 2015 Nigeria Women Premier League =

Nigeria Women Premier League
- Season: 2015
- Champions: Rivers Angels
- Promoted: Abia Angels
- Top goalscorer: Rofiat Sule (11 goals)

The 2015 Nigeria Women Premier League is the 25th season of women's association football in Nigeria, and the second season since the re-branding of the competition from a championship to a premier league. The league started in May 2015, and the regular season was concluded by September of the same year. Rivers Angels came to the season as defending champions after winning the 2014 edition. They successfully defended the title by defeating Bayelsa Queens by a lone goal from Osinachi Ohale in the super six final in Umuahia, Abia State. The super six tournament began on October 20 and was concluded November 5, 2015.

== League standings ==
=== Group A ===
Pos	Team	Pld	W	D	L	GF	GA	GD	Pts	Qualification or relegation
1	Bayelsa Queens	12	9	1	2	32	9	+23	28	Qualification to the 2015 Super 6 tournament
2	Delta Queens	12	7	1	4	22	11	+11	22	Qualification to the 2015 Super 6 tournament
3	Confluence Queens	12	6	2	4	19	12	+7	20	Qualification to the 2015 Super 6 tournament
4	Adamawa Queens	12	5	2	5	13	14	−1	17	
5	Ibom Angels	12	5	1	6	15	11	+4	16	
6	Osun Babes	12	4	4	4	14	18	−4	16	
7	FC Robo	12	4	2	6	14	19	−5	14	
8	Martins White Doves	12	0	3	9	4	39	−35	3	Relegation to pro league

Rules for classification: 1) points; 2) goal difference; 3) number of goals scored.

=== Group B ===
Pos	Team	Pld	W	D	L	GF	GA	GD	Pts	Qualification or relegation
1	Rivers Angels	12	9	1	2	25	7	+18	28	Qualification to the 2015 Super 6 tournament
2	Nasarawa Amazons	12	8	3	1	22	7	+15	27	Qualification to the 2015 Super 6 tournament
3	Sunshine Queens	12	7	2	3	21	8	+13	23	Qualification to the 2015 Super 6 tournament
4	Edo Queens	12	4	3	5	12	18	−6	15	
5	Pelican Stars	12	4	1	7	11	22	−11	13	
6	Taraba Queens	12	3	3	6	12	18	−6	12	
7	Capital City Doves	12	2	4	6	12	22	−10	10	
8	COD United Amazons F.C.	12	1	3	8	9	22	−13	6	Relegation to pro league

Rules for classification: 1) points; 2) goal difference; 3) number of goals scored.

== Super six tournament ==
The super six tournament was hosted by Abia State government in Umuahia Township Stadium. Rivers Angels, Delta Queens, Nasarawa Amazons, Confluence Queens, Bayelsa Queens and Sunshine Queens qualified by being part of the top three teams in group A and B. Rivers Angels qualified for the final by defeating both Nasarawa Amazons and Sunshine Queens by a lone goal. However, the second finalist, Bayelsa Queens drew their first game against Delta Queens but went on to defeat Confluence Queens by four goals to one. This was the same number of points recorded by fellow pool member, Delta Queens but Bayelsa edged their regional rivals for the finals on superior goal difference. However, Delta Queens were able to qualify for the loser's final by defeating Confluence Queens by two goals to one in their second game.

=== Preliminaries ===
==== Pool A ====
Pos	Team	Pld	W	D	L	GF	GA	GD	Pts	Qualification
1	Rivers Angels	2	2	0	0	2	0	+2	6	Qualification to the final
2	Nasarawa Amazons	2	1	0	1	2	2	0	3	
3	Sunshine Queens	2	0	0	2	1	3	−2	0	

Rules for classification: 1) points; 2) goal difference; 3) number of goals scored.

==== Pool B ====
Pos	Team	Pld	W	D	L	GF	GA	GD	Pts	Qualification
1	Bayelsa Queens	2	1	1	0	5	2	+3	4	Qualification to the final
2	Delta Queens	2	1	1	0	3	2	+1	4	
3	Confluence Queens	2	0	0	2	2	6	−4	0	

Rules for classification: 1) points; 2) goal difference; 3) number of goals scored.

=== Third place ===
5 November 2015
14:00

Nasarawa Amazons	2–1	Delta Queens
Ogbiagbevha; Ogbiagbevha	Report	Jegede

Umuahia Township Stadium, Umuahia

=== Final ===
5 November 2015
16:00

Rivers Angels	1–0	Bayelsa Queens
Ohale 39'	Report

Umuahia Township Stadium, Umuahia

== Top scorers ==
- Rofiat Sule (Bayelsa Queens) - 11 goals
- Precious Edewor (Osun Babes) - 8 goals
