= 2016 Nigeria Women Premier League =

Nigeria Women Premier League
- Season: 2016
- Champions: Rivers Angels F.C.
- Top goalscorer: Rafiat Sule (9 goals)
- Biggest home win: Delta Queens F.C. 6 vs 0 Martin White Doves F.C. (11 June 2016)
- Biggest away win: 3 matches: Martin White Doves F.C. 1-4 Rivers Angels F.C. (22 May 2016); Martin White Doves F.C. 0-3 Capital City Doves F.C. (3 June 2016); F.C. Robo 0-3 Taraba Queens F.C. (18 June 2016)
- Highest scoring: Osun Babes 4 vs 3 Abia Angels (4 June 2016)
- All statistics correct as of 5 October 2016.

The 2016 Nigeria Women Premier League was scheduled to start in February 2016, but was moved to 21 May, 2016. A total of 18 teams were registered for the season. The teams are divided into two groups of nine each. The winner of each abridged league will meet at the end of the season to determine the overall winner of the league. The Nigeria Women Premier League is one of the league competitions administered by the Nigeria Women Football League (NWFL) board.

Rivers Angels F.C. came to the season as defending champions after winning the super six tournament in Abia State in the previous season. On 30 October 2016, Nasarawa Amazons F.C. and Rivers Angels F.C. were confirmed winners of group A and B respectively. Rafiat Sule and Paulinus Ifeoma of Bayelsa Queens F.C. and COD United Ladies F.C. respectively led the scorer's chart with nine goals, with the former edging Ifeoma with superior assist record (5). This is the second consecutive year of Sule being top scorer as she was also the goal king in 2015 season.

On 10 August 2016, Tokas Queens and Capital City Doves were expunged from the league for failure to honour three consecutive matches. The number of expelled team was increased to seven a few weeks later after Nasarawa Amazons, Martin White Doves, F.C Robo, Confluence Queens and Adamawa Queens were also evicted for similar reasons. The NWFL board explained that their commitment to improving professionalism in female football in Nigeria was reason for the strict adherence to the prior rules of the competition. The economic recession in Nigeria has been highlighted as the reason for failure of teams to meet the financial demands of games. The clubs were later reinstated to the league after the League Management Company gave ten million naira to alleviate the running of the league.

On 21 January 2017, at the Abuja National Stadium, Rivers Angels defeated Nasarawa Amazons on penalties after playing goalless. This is the second trophy won by the club after winning the 2016 Nigeria Women's Cup.

== Format ==
Eighteen teams in two groups of nine each competed for the league title. Each team plays with every team in her respective group. Unlike 2015 season, where the top 3 teams from each group contested in a super 6 mini-tournament in Abia State to determine the overall winner, this season title decider involves only the winner of group A and group B. This two seasons are in contrast with the 2014 season where a complete round robin system was used. Rivers Angels and Nasarawa Amazons are to contest in a winners final to determine the overall winner of the league.

== Clubs ==
2016 Nigeria Women Premier League
Team	Stadium	State
Rivers Angels F.C.	Yakubu Gowon Stadium	Rivers State
Delta Queens F.C.		Delta State
Pelican Stars F.C.	U. J. Esuene Stadium	Cross River State
Sunshine Queens F.C.	Akure Township Stadium	Ondo State
Osun Babes F.C.	Oshogbo Stadium	Osun State
Bayelsa Queens F.C.	Ughelli Township Stadium	Bayelsa State
Tokas Queens F.C.		Lagos State
Abia Angels F.C.	Umuahia Township Stadium	Abia State
Nasarawa Amazons F.C.	Aper Aku Stadium	Nasarawa State
COD United Ladies F.C.		Lagos State
F.C. Robo Queens	Legacy Pitch, Surulere	Lagos State
Confluence Queens F.C.	Confluence Stadium	Kogi State
Martins White Doves F.C.	Samuel Ogbemudia Stadium	Edo State
Adamawa Queens F.C.		Adamawa State
Taraba Queens F.C.		Taraba State
Edo Queens F.C.	Samuel Ogbemudia Stadium	Edo State
Ibom Angels F.C.	Akwa-Ibom Stadium	Akwa Ibom State
Capital City Doves F.C.		Abuja

=== Geographical location ===
Locations of the Nigeria Women Premier League 2016 teams

== League standings ==
=== Group A ===
Pos	Team	Pld	W	D	L	GF	GA	GD	Pts
1	Nasarawa Amazons F.C.	16	12	0	4	29	8	+21	36
2	Bayelsa Queens F.C.	16	9	4	3	30	11	+19	31
3	Ibom Angels F.C.	16	10	1	5	21	11	+10	31
4	COD United Ladies F.C.	16	9	2	5	22	15	+7	29
5	Osun Babes F.C.	16	6	5	5	16	18	−2	23
6	Edo Queens F.C.	15	6	2	7	13	21	−8	20
7	Abia Angels F.C.	16	4	4	8	19	29	−10	16
8	Pelican Stars F.C.	16	3	3	10	15	26	−11	12
9	Tokas Queens F.C.	15	0	3	12	4	30	−26	3

Updated to match(es) played on 6 October 2016. Source: Standings
Rules for classification: 1) points; 2) goal difference; 3) number of goals scored.

=== Group B ===
Pos	Team	Pld	W	D	L	GF	GA	GD	Pts
1	Rivers Angels F.C.	14	9	3	2	26	7	+19	30
2	Delta Queens F.C.	14	9	3	2	25	11	+14	30
3	Sunshine Queens F.C.	14	8	3	3	23	10	+13	27
4	Confluence Queens F.C.	15	6	5	4	15	10	+5	23
5	Adamawa Queens F.C.	14	4	3	7	12	14	−2	15
6	F.C. Robo Queens	14	3	3	8	13	29	−16	12
7	Taraba Queens F.C.	14	2	4	8	9	21	−12	10
8	Capital City Doves F.C.	14	1	3	10	6	27	−21	6
9	Martin White Doves F.C.	0	0	0	0	0	0	0	0

Updated to match(es) played on 6 October 2016. Source: Standings
Rules for classification: 1) points; 2) goal difference; 3) number of goals scored.

== Awards ==
=== Player of the month ===
The NWPL player of the month is sponsored by futbalgalore.com.

- May: Seun Fakunle (Delta Queens)
- June: Patience Kalu (Bayelsa Queens)
- July: Glory Iroka (Rivers Angels)
- August: Esther Anthony (Osun Babes)
- September: Paulinus Ifeoma (COD United Ladies F.C.)

== Statistics ==
=== Scorers chart ===
As of December 2016

Rank	Player	Team	Goals
1	(Nigeria) Rofiat Sule	Bayelsa Queens	9
1	(Nigeria) Ifeoma Paulinus	COD United	9
3	(Nigeria) Patience Kalu	Bayelsa Queens	6
4	(Nigeria) Anthony Esther	Osun Babes	5
4	(Nigeria) Amarachi Ojinma	Rivers Angels	5
4	(Nigeria) Ibinabo Georgewill	Rivers Angels	5
4	(Nigeria) Imo Anam	Nasarawa Amazons F.C.	5
4	(Nigeria) Joy Jegede	Delta Queens	5
