= Rasheedat Ajibade =

Nigerian footballer (born 1999)

Rasheedat Ajibade OON
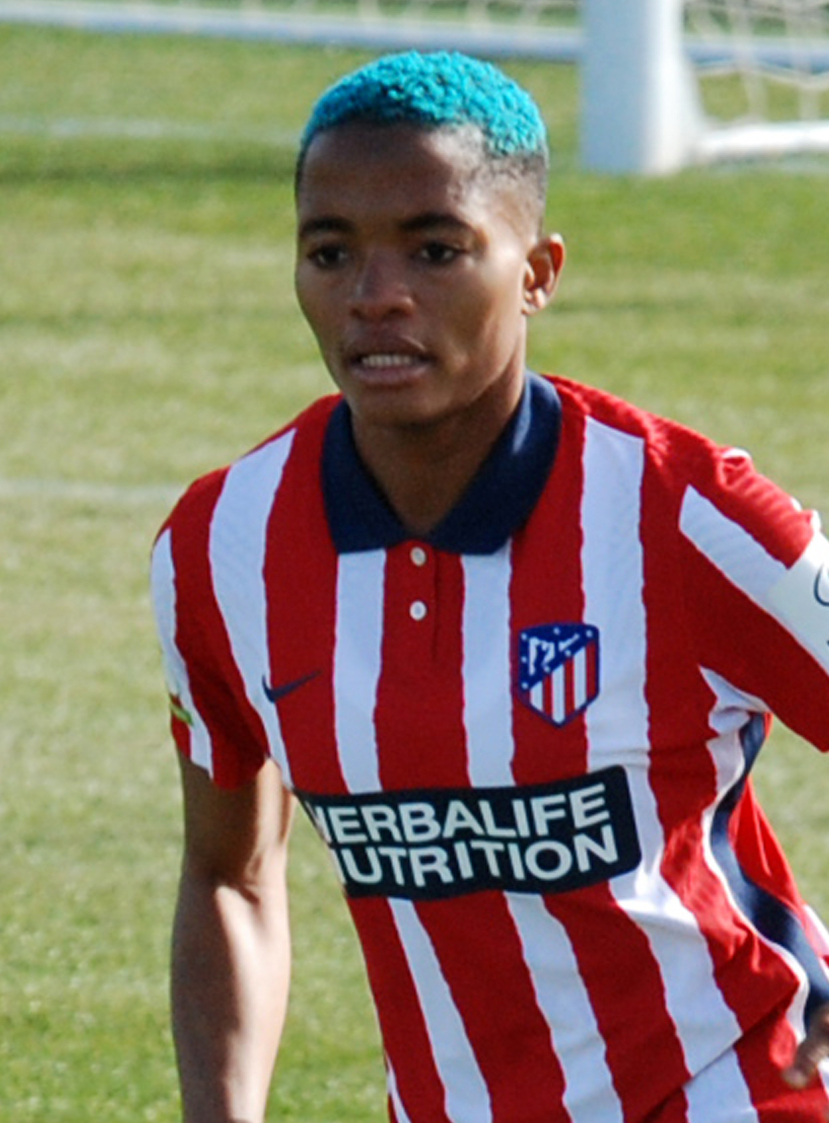
- Ajibade with Atlético Madrid in 2021

Personal information
- Full name: Rasheedat Busayo Ajibade
- Date of birth: 8 December 1999 (age 26)
- Place of birth: Lagos, Nigeria
- Height: 1.67 m (5 ft 6 in)
- Position: Forward

Team information
- Current team: Paris Saint-Germain
- Number: 10

Senior career*
Years	Team	Apps	(Gls)
2013–2018	FC Robo		(9)
2018–2020	Avaldnes	39	(12)
2021–2025	Atlético Madrid	136	(40)
2025–	Paris Saint-Germain	15	(1)

International career^{‡}
2014-2016	Nigeria U17	11	(10)
2016-2018	Nigeria U20	13	(11)
2018–	Nigeria	51	(23)
Medal record
Women's Football
Representing Nigeria
Women's Africa Cup of Nations
Winner	2024
Winner	2018
- * Club domestic league appearances and goals as of 17 August 2026 ‡ National team caps and goals as of 17 August 2026

Rasheedat Busayo Ajibade OON (born 8 December 1999) is a Nigerian professional footballer who plays as a forward for French Première Ligue club Paris Saint-Germain and captains the Nigeria women's national football team.

Ajibade represented Nigeria before making her competitive debut for the senior team at the 2018 WAFU Women's Cup in Côte d'Ivoire. In 2017, she was named first in a top 10 list of most promising young footballers on the African continent by Goal.com.

== Club career ==
Ajibade played for FC Robo from the 2013 Nigeria Women Premier League season to the 2018 season. In 2014, she was listed as one of the best young talents in the league. In September 2018, she won the Nigerian women football freestyle competition for the second time.

During the 2015 Nigeria Women Premier League week 2 games, Ajibade was listed in the team of the week, compiled by Soccerladuma South Africa, despite her team losing to Confluence Queens during the round of matches. For the 2017 Nigeria Women Premier League season, Ajibade was made team captain of FC Robo. She was one of the scorers in Robos' home win against Ibom Angels during the season. On 13 July 2017, after losing to Rivers Angels, Ajibade was cited by SuperSport to rue her team chances of qualifying for Super 4, because of the difference in points and the limited number of games remaining. Ajibade won the first edition of Nigeria National Freestyle Championship. In 2017, despite Robo not being among teams that finished tops, Ajibade was voted player of the season after scoring eight goals to save her team from relegation. In May 2018, she was nominated as the best player in the 2017 Nigeria Women Premier League at Nigeria Pitch Awards. In December 2018, Ajibade reportedly signed a two-year contract with Norwegian side, Avaldsnes IL, a team that plays in the Toppserien. On 1January 2021, Atletico Madrid announced her signing for a two-year deal. In January 2022, Rasheedat Ajibade extended her contract with Atletico Madrid for a further three years, until 2025.

On August 26, 2025, Ajibade joined Paris Saint Germain on a two-year deal that will last until June 30, 2027.

== International career ==
Ajibade has represented Nigeria at under-17, under-20 and the senior national team. In the African qualifiers, en route to the 2014 FIFA U-17 Women's World Cup, Ajibade scored a brace for Nigeria first leg win over Namibia. At the competition proper, she scored the winning goal in Nigeria's first game against China. In the final group game against Mexico, she scored a goal in Nigeria, two goal win to seal a quarter final game with Spain.

Ajibade was named in Coach Bala Nikiyu 21-man squad for 2016 FIFA U-17 Women's World Cup, wearing jersey number 10. At the competition, Ajibade was the captain of Nigeria women's national under-17 football team. Ajibade was also part of Nigeria women's national under-20 football team at the 2016 FIFA U-20 Women's World Cup, where she was named man-of-the-match in the second group game against Canada.

In the first round encounter to determine Africa's representative at 2018 FIFA U-20 Women's World Cup, Ajibade scored a brace in the first leg tie against Tanzania, giving Nigeria a three-goal advantage before the return leg in Dar e Sallam. In the return leg in October 2017, she scored two out of six goals against the home-side. On 27 January 2018, Ajibade scored two goals in Nigeria's six goal win against South Africa, securing Nigeria women's national under-20 football team's qualification for the 2018 FIFA U-20 Women's World Cup in France.

In February 2018, Ajibade alongside Joy Jegede, Osarenoma Igbinovia and 18 other players were selected by head coach, Thomas Dennerby to represent Nigeria at the inaugural edition of WAFU Cup in Côte d'Ivoire. In the second group game of the regional tournament, Ajibade scored a hat-trick to take Nigeria to the semi-finals with a game left.

Ajibade was part of the 2018 African Nations Championship Nigeria women's national football team where she won the tournament alongside the team. She captained the Super Falcons for the first time in a 1-0 friendly victory over Slovenian club, Olimpija Lubijana in Vienna, Austria.

On 24 May 2019, Ajibade was part of the Nigerian team to play the 2019 FIFA Women's World Cup. She also played for the 2022 Women's Africa Cup of Nations.

On 16 June 2023, she was included in the 23-player Nigerian squad for the FIFA Women's World Cup 2023. During the Olympic qualifiers for the Paris 2024 Olympics, Ajibade scored a crucial penalty for the Super Falcons in their match against South Africa. This victory secured Nigeria's qualification for the competition, which began in July 2024.

Ajibade was called up to the Nigeria squad for the 2024 Summer Olympics.

Ajibade captained the Nigerian team at the 2024 Women's Africa Cup of Nations. On 26 July 2025, they won the tournament after a 3-2 victory over hosts Morocco. She was named Player of the Tournament.

Captaining the Super Falcons at the 2026 Women's Africa Cup of Nations (WAFCON), Ajibade led Nigeria to quarter-final qualification following a group stage recovery. After a opening match loss to Malawi, she captained a 10-woman Nigerian squad to a 1–0 victory against Zambia on 1 August 2026. In the final group fixture against Egypt on 5 August 2026, Ajibade converted a 91st-minute penalty and provided an assist for Joy Omewa in stoppage time, securing a 6–2 victory to set up a quarter-final fixture against Cameroon.

== Personal life ==
In the summer of 2020 Ajibade launched her annual #StandOutWithRASH campaign aimed at promoting grassroots football talents within Nigeria. She also founded the Rasheedat Ajibade Foundation to empower Nigerian youths.

Ajibade is a devout Christian, and in a 2022 match for the national team after scoring a goal she wore a t-shirt under her jersey with written "Thank You Jesus".

== Career statistics ==
International goals

No.	Date	Venue	Opponent	Score	Result	Competition
1.	17 February 2018	Felix Houphouet Boigny Stadium, Abidjan, Ivory Coast	Senegal	1−0	3−0	2018 WAFU Zone B Women's Cup
2.	17 February 2018	Felix Houphouet Boigny Stadium, Abidjan, Ivory Coast	Senegal	2−0	3−0	2018 WAFU Zone B Women's Cup
3.	17 February 2018	Felix Houphouet Boigny Stadium, Abidjan, Ivory Coast	Senegal	3−0	3−0	2018 WAFU Zone B Women's Cup
4.	21 November 2018	Cape Coast Sports Stadium, Cape Coast, Ghana	Zambia	3–0	4–0	2018 Women's Africa Cup of Nations
5.	13 June 2021	BBVA Stadium, Houston, United States	Portugal	3−3	3−3	Friendly
6.	11 April 2022	Starlight Stadium, Langford, Canada	Canada	2–1	2–2	Friendly
7.	4 July 2022	Stade Moulay Hassan, Rabat, Morocco	South Africa	1–2	1–2	2022 Africa Women Cup of Nations
8.	10 July 2022	Stade Moulay Hassan, Rabat, Morocco	Burundi	1–0	4–0	2022 Africa Women Cup of Nations
9.	13 July 2022	Stade Mohammed V, Casablanca, Morocco	Cameroon	1–0	1–0	2022 Africa Women Cup of Nations
10.	25 October 2023	Abebe Bikila Stadium, Addis Ababa, Ethiopia	Ethiopia	1–1	1–1	2024 CAF Women's Olympic Qualifying Tournament
11.	31 October 2023	Moshood Abiola National Stadium, Abuja, Nigeria	Ethiopia	1–0	4–0	2024 CAF Women's Olympic Qualifying Tournament
12.	31 October 2023	Moshood Abiola National Stadium, Abuja, Nigeria	Ethiopia	3–0	4–0	2024 CAF Women's Olympic Qualifying Tournament
13.	5 December 2023	Estádio Nacional de Cabo Verde, Praia, Cape Verde	Cape Verde	2−1	2−1	2024 Women's Africa Cup of Nations qualification
14.	5 April 2024	Moshood Abiola National Stadium, Abuja, Nigeria	South Africa	1–0	1–0	2024 CAF Women's Olympic Qualifying Tournament
15.	26 October 2024	Remo Stars Stadium, Lagos, Nigeria	Algeria	1–0	2–0	Friendly
16.	26 October 2024	Remo Stars Stadium, Lagos, Nigeria	Algeria	2–0	2–0	Friendly
17.	3 June 2025	MKO Abiola Stadium, Abeokuta, Nigeria	Cameroon	1−0	2−0	Friendly
18.	3 June 2025	MKO Abiola Stadium, Abeokuta, Nigeria	Cameroon	2−0	2−0	Friendly
19.	29 June 2025	Ziaida Sports Complex, Mohammedia, Morocco	Ghana	3–0	3–1	Friendly
20.	22 July 2025	Larbi Zaouli Stadium, Casablanca, Morocco	South Africa	1–0	2–1	2024 Women's Africa Cup of Nations
21.	22 July 2026	Lenoria Sports Complex, Casablanca, Morocco	Tanzania	1–0	2–1	Friendly
22.	28 July 2026	Al Medina Stadium, Rabat, Morocco	Malawi	1–2	2–3	2026 Women's Africa Cup of Nations
23.	28 July 2026	Rabat Olympic Stadium, Rabat, Morocco	Egypt	4–2	6–2	2026 Women's Africa Cup of Nations

== Honours ==
Atlético Madrid

- Copa de la Reina: 2022–23
- Supercopa de Espana: 2020–21

Nigeria

- Women's Africa Cup of Nations: 2018, 2024
- WAFU Women's Cup third place: 2018

Individual

- Women's Africa Cup of Nations Player of the Tournament: 2024
- Women's Africa Cup of Nations Top scorer: 2022
- Women's Africa Cup of Nations Team of the Tournament: 2022, 2024
- CAF Team of the Year Women's XI: 2024
- Toppserien Team of the Season: 2020
- League Bloggers Award NWPL Player of the Season: 2017
- Nigeria Pitch Awards NWPL Player of the season: 2017
- Nigeria Women Premier League Top scorer: 2017 (jointly held with Reuben Charity)
- Nigeria Football Federation Young Player Of The Year: 2018
- Liga F Player of the Month: September 2024

Orders

- Officer of the Order of the Niger
