= 2017 Nigeria Women Premier League =

Nigeria Women Premier League
- Season: 2017
- Promoted: Sure Babes; Jokodolu Babes; Taraba Queens
- Relegated: Saadatu Amazons; Heatland Queens
- Top goalscorer: Rasheedat Ajibade, Reuben Charity and Vivian Uwandi (8 goals)
- Biggest home win: FC Robo 5-0 Heartland Queens (Wk 14)
- Biggest away win: Saadatu Amazon 0-4 Delta Queens (Wk 11)
- Highest scoring: Delta Queens 5-1 Osun Babes (Wk 14)

The 2017 Nigeria Women Premier League began on March 25, 2017. The date was fixed during the congress for women football league system in Nigeria on February 22, 2017, in Abuja, which had the Minister for Sports, Solomon Dalung in attendance. Martin White Doves, Tokas Queens, Capital City Doves and Taraba Queens were relegated from the previous season. Heartland Queens of Owerri and Sadaatu Kolo Amazons of Niger State were promoted to the elite division. Rofiat Sule, the top scorer of the last two seasons and Evelyn Nwabuoku, captain of the national team amongst others were signed by Rivers Angels F.C. In March 2017, previously relegated Capital City Doves were re-added to the league, increasing the number of teams to seventeen. On 24 March, COD United Amazons F.C. and Capital City Doves were confirmed to be excluded from the league after failing to meet the registration deadline. This reduced the number of teams to fifteen.

== Format ==
The league board adopted an abridged format of eight teams in two groups. The top two teams in each group will play in a super 4 tournament to determine the overall winner of the league. In August 2017, Bayelsa Queens, Rivers Angels, Nasarawa Amazons and Delta Queens qualified for the super four tournament in Benin city .

== Team information ==
=== Group A ===
Team information
Team	Stadium	Location	Coach
Rivers Angels F.C.	Yakubu Gowon Stadium	Rivers State	Edwin Okon
Ibom Angels F.C.		Akwa Ibom State	Whyte Ogbonda
FC Robo		Lagos State	Emmanuel Osahon
Bayelsa Queens F.C.		Bayelsa State	Amabebe Ayebatonye
Abia Angels F.C.		Abia State	Ann Chiejine
Heartland Queens F.C.			Eucharia Uche
Sunshine Queens F.C.			Matthew Wemimo

=== Group B ===
Team information
Team	Stadium	Location	Coach
Confluence Queens F.C.		Lokoja	Tosin Ojo
Nasarawa Amazons F.C.		Nasarawa State	Christopher Danjuma
Pelican Stars F.C.		Calabar	Adat Egan
Osun Babes F.C.		Osogbo	Liadi Bashir
Sa'adatu Amazons F.C.		Minna	Ibrahim Ladan
Adamawa Queens F.C.		Adamawa State	Bello Mohammed
Edo Queens F.C.	Samuel Ogbemudia Stadium	Edo State	Kenneth Aigbe
Delta Queens F.C.		Delta State	Clifford Chukwuma

== Major transfers ==
2017 Nigeria Women Premier League
Team	Player (former club)
Rivers Angels F.C.	Rofiat Sule (Bayelsa Queens), Tochuchukwu Oluehi (Medkila IL), Patience Kalu (Bayelsa Queens), Evelyn Nwabuoku (En Avant de Guingamp), Cecilia Nku (Medkila IL) and Halimatu Ayinde (FC Minsk)
Confluence Queens F.C.	Happiness Dauda (Taraba Queens), Ramat Abdulkarim (Abia Angels), Hauwa Abdullahi (Nasarawa Amazons), Esther Momoh (Sunshine Queens) and Tina Oyateleme (Sunshine Queens F.C.)
Ibom Angels F.C.	Joy Eroezi, Imaobong Emmanuel, Aniema Ibanga, Okadike Ugochi, Elizabeth Edward, Cynthia Akwasi, Mercy Udo Akpan, Blessing Dabrinze, Racheal Kolawole, Charity Isaiah
Delta Queens F.C.	Lilian Cole (Bayelsa Queens), Njoku Chinyere (Capital City Doves), Maryan Ohadiwe (Adamawa Queens) and Amirat Adebisi (FC Robo Queens)
Sunshine Queens F.C.	Shola Oyewusi (Rivers Angels F.C.), Winifred Eyebhoria ((Rivers Angels F.C.)), Akudo Ogbonna (FC Robo), Nenna Eke (Ibom Angels), Kate Akpata (Ibom Angels), Alaba Adeusi (Osun Babes F.C.), Yemi Oladidupo and Kemi Odubanjo

== League standings ==
=== Group A ===
Pos	Team	Pld	W	D	L	GF	GA	GD	Pts	Qualification or relegation
1	Bayelsa Queens	12	7	2	3	17	9	+8	23	Qualification to the 2017 Super 4 tournament
2	Rivers Angels	12	6	4	2	19	9	+10	22	Qualification to the 2017 Super 4 tournament
3	Sunshine Queens	12	5	3	4	16	13	+3	18	
4	Ibom Angels	12	4	3	5	18	13	+5	15	
5	FC Robo	12	4	3	5	16	18	−2	15	
6	Abia Angels	12	3	4	5	8	14	−6	13	
7	Heartland Queens	12	2	3	7	7	25	−18	9	Relegation to pro league

Rules for classification: 1) points; 2) goal difference; 3) number of goals scored.

=== Group B ===
Pos	Team	Pld	W	D	L	GF	GA	GD	Pts	Qualification or relegation
1	Delta Queens F.C.	14	7	5	2	23	11	+12	26	Qualification to the 2017 Super 4 tournament
2	Nasarawa Amazons	14	8	2	4	19	7	+12	26	Qualification to the 2017 Super 4 tournament
3	Adamawa Queens	14	5	6	3	14	11	+3	21	
4	Confluence Queens	14	6	3	5	12	9	+3	21	
5	Osun Babes F.C.	14	6	3	5	17	17	0	21	
6	Edo Queens F.C.	14	5	5	4	16	12	+4	20	
7	Pelican Stars F.C.	14	3	6	5	11	17	−6	15	
8	Saadatu Amazons F.C.	14	0	2	12	3	31	−28	2	Relegation to pro league

Rules for classification: 1) points; 2) goal difference; 3) number of goals scored.

== Super 4 tournament ==
In August 2017, the league board fixed September 11 to 16th for the commencement of the mini-tournament. Samuel Ogbemudia Stadium will host the event. The winner and runner-up is to get ₦3,000,000 and ₦2,000,000 respectively. On September 7, 2017, it was announced that the super four has been rescheduled to hold on October 9-14th in the same venue. This was due to the scheduling conflict with 2018 FIFA U-20 Women's World Cup qualifiers and Aiteo Cup games within same period. In October 2017, the NWFL reached an agreement with Akogate Waters for the third place team to get ₦1,000,000 as prize money.

== Top scorers ==
As of end of regular season

Rank	Player	Team	Goals
1	Reuben Charity	Ibom Angels	8
1	Rasheedat Ajibade	FC Robo Queens	8
1	Vivian Uwandi	Edo Queens	8
4	Tessy Biawho	Bayelsa Queens	6
4	Ijeoma Obi	Delta Queens	6
4	Monday Gift	FC Robo Queens	6
4	Rosemary Okezie	Delta Queens	6
