= DreamStar FC Ladies =

- Full name: DreamStar FC Ladies
- Nickname: The Galacticas
- Founded: February 29th, 2012; 14 years ago
- Ground: Onikan Stadium
- Capacity: 4,000
- Owner: Dream Stars Sports Development Organisation
- Chairman: AbdulRahmon Abolore
- Manager: Sheriff Tajudeen
- League: Nigerian Women Premier League

DreamStar FC Ladies is a Nigerian women's association football club based in Lagos, Lagos State. The club competes in the NWFL Championship, the second tier of women's football in Nigeria.

DreamStar gained promotion to the NWFL Premiership after finishing unbeaten in the Southern Conference of the 2017–18 NWFL Pro League. The club competed in Nigeria's top-flight women's league before subsequently returning to the NWFL Championship.

Originally known as Dream Stars Ladies, the club adopted the name DreamStar FC Ladies in April 2020. It is the women's football team of Dream Stars Sports Development Organisation, which was established on 29 February 2012 by founder and chairman AbdulRahmon Abolore.

Known as Dream Stars Ladies, until April 2020, the DreamStar FC Ladies had the distinction of being the only club-side with a clean sheet in the 2nd Division Pro league 2017–2018 season in both Northern and Southern Conferences. DreamStar FC Ladies is the female, and most distinguished professional, squad of Dream Stars Sports Development Organisation, a grassroots soccer development company that provides a total value-chain development programme through its football academy for boys and girls to the professional stage. The Dream Stars Sports Development Organisation, its academy, and clubs were created on 29 February 2012.

== History ==
=== 2026 NWFL Championship season ===
DreamStar FC Ladies competed in the 2026 NWFL Championship, the second tier of Nigerian women's football. The club was drawn in Group A alongside Delta Babes, Rosaria Victrix and First Mahi Babes.

DreamStar opened the competition with a 3–1 victory over Rosaria Victrix before defeating First Mahi Babes 2–1 in their second group match. A goalless draw against Delta Babes in their final group game saw the club finish first in Group A with seven points and qualify for the promotion playoff.

In the promotion playoff at the U. J. Esuene Stadium in Calabar, DreamStar faced Pelican Stars. The club was defeated 1–0 after Blessing Ayila scored for Pelican Stars deep into stoppage time. The result ended DreamStar's attempt to secure promotion to the 2026–27 NWFL Premiership. DreamStar FC Ladies played in the Southern Conference of the lower division of NWFL Pro League in the 2017–2018 season, and topped the division, without losing a match. This earned them promotion to the Premier Division of the NWFL for the 2018/2019 season.

The first season in the premiership league was not without its challenges, and despite recording some memorable feats such as scoring the most goals for any debutante side (4-0 against Heartland Queens) in the NWFL history (2nd highest for any club to Bayelsa Queens' 5–1 trouncing of Kaduna Queens), and winning the NWFL Goal of the Season Award 2018/2019, scored by defender, Oluwabunmi Oladeji, DreamStar FC Ladies finished at the bottom of the table in their group. To retain their place in the premier league, DreamStar FC Ladies had to engage in play-offs against three other relegation-bound clubs from the other three groups. The debutantes (known then as Dream Stars Ladies) edged Invincible Angels 4–2 on penalties after they played out a 1–1 draw in regulation time at the FIFA Goal Project pitch, MKO Stadium, to avoid relegation. The team secured a lead in the 21st minute of the play-off, as Anuoluwapo Salisu’s corner kick found captain Judith Nwaogu, whose header beat the Heartland Queen's goalkeeper. However, the Benue State based side fought back in the second half and levelled matters in the 84th minute through Kafayat Bashiru before full-time, but eventually bowed out in the ensuing penalty kicks.

=== 2019–2020 season ===
In the 2019–2020 the NWPL changes its 4-group format to 2 groups, to enable higher quality of competition. DreamStar FC Ladies have been drawn into Group A, along with Pelican Stars FC, Nasarawa Amazons FC, Sunshine Stars FC, Bayelsa Queens FC, Abia Angels FC, Confluence Queens FC, and Edo Queens FC. The top two teams from each group will qualify automatically for the Nigeria Women's Super Cup (also known as The Super 4 Championship), while the last teams from the two groups will get relegated to the NWFL - 2nd Division Pro League.

=== 2025–2026 season ===
The 2025–2026 match fixtures:

League - NWFL Championship

Promotion playoff - runners-up

== 2020–2021 season ==
The 2020–2021 match fixtures:

All league matches in 2020-2021 Season (all matches are played at 4:00 pm GMT+1)
Opponent	Home/Away	Venue	Matchday
Delta Queens FC	Away	Agbor Stadium, Delta State	9 December 2020
Edo Queens FC	Home	Agege Stadium Lagos	16 December 2020
Abia Angels FC	Away	Umuahia Township Stadium	23 December 2020
Ibom Angels FC	Home	Agege Stadium Lagos	6 January 2021
Osun Babes FC	Away	Osogbo Township Stadium	13 January 2021
Pelican Stars FC	Home	Agege Stadium Lagos	20 January 2021
Royal Queens FC	Away	Warri Township Stadium	27 January 2021
FC Robo Queens	Away	Legacy Pitch Lagos	3 February 2021
Rivers Angels FC	Home	Agege Stadium Lagos	10 February 2021
Sunshine Stars FC	Away	Akure Township Stadium	17 February 2021
Nasarawa Amazons FC	Home	Agege Stadium Lagos	24 February 2021
Bayelsa Queens FC	Away	Samson Siasia Stadium	3 March 2021
Confluence Queens FC	Home	Agege Stadium Lagos	10 March 2021
End of first round / Mid-season Transfer Window
Confluence Queens FC	Away	Confluence Stadium Lokoja	14 April 2021
Bayelsa Queens FC	Home	Agege Stadium Lagos	21 April 2021
Nasarawa Amazons FC	Away	Lafia Stadium	28 April 2021
Sunshine Stars FC	Home	Agege Stadium Lagos	5 May 2021
Rivers Angels FC	Away	Sharks Stadium Port Harcourt	12 May 2021
FC Robo Queens	Home	Agege Stadium Lagos	19 May 2021
Royal Queens FC	Home	Agege Stadium Lagos	26 May 2021
Pelican Stars FC	Away	U. J. Esuene Stadium	2 June 2021
Osun Babes FC	Home	Agege Stadium Lagos	9 June 2021
Ibom Angels FC	Away	Godswill Akpabio Stadium (Training Pitch)	16 June 2021
Abia Angels FC	Home	Agege Stadium Lagos	23 June 2021
Edo Queens FC	Away	Uniben Sports Complex	30 June 2021
Delta Queens FC	Home	Agege Stadium Lagos	7 July 2021

== Players ==
=== 2022 League Season ===
The team list for the 2020-2021 league season is as below:

Note: Flags indicate national team as defined under FIFA eligibility rules; some limited exceptions apply. Players may hold more than one non-FIFA nationality.

No.	Pos.	Nation	Player
1	GK	NGR	Shukurat Ayomide Bakare
2	DF	NGR	Joy Onyedikachi Samson
3	DF	NGR	Confidence Uchendu
4	MF	NGR	Tosin Ogundeko
5	DF	NGR	Chima Nwadigo
6	DF	NGR	Naomi Omotine Afemikhe
7	FW	NGR	Hembefan Roseline Ayatsea
8	MF	NGR	Olamide Adugbe
9	MF	NGR	Opeyemi Dorcas Akanbi
10	MF	NGR	Grace Anuoluwapo Salisu (vice-captain)
11	MF	NGR	Favour Kalu
12	MF	NGR	Juliet Chika Emereole (captain)
13	MF	NGR	Nenrot Galadima Kitka
14	FW	NGR	Bukola Owoseni
15	DF	NGR	Rashidat Ajoke Ijaola
16	DF	NGR	Abosede Shoroye
17	FW	NGR	Bright Ifesinachi Nnaji
18	MF	NGR	Kafayat Folakemi Shittu
19	MF	NGR	Zainab Funke Olayiwola

No.	Pos.	Nation	Player
20	MF	NGR	Opeyemi Ajakaye
21	GK	NGR	Christiana Hussaini
22	MF	NGR	Sofiat Omotoyosi Bankole
23	FW	NGR	Olayemi Barakat Oladipupo
24	DF	NGR	Obiageri Orizu
25	DF	NGR	Dorcas Effiong
26	MF	NGR	Tumininu Adeshina
27	FW	NGR	Zainab Pelumi Yinusa
28	DF	NGR	Judith Odinaka Nwaogu
29	MF	NGR	Zulfah Enitan AbdulAzeez
30	MF	NGR	Olamide Isiaka
31	FW	NGR	Mavis Nicholas
32	MF	NGR	Mary Abosede Salami
33	DF	NGR	Endurance Eniola Omoraka
34	DF	NGR	Ayotunde Rebecca Omiyoola
35	GK	NGR	Ugonnia Miracle Okafor
38	MF	NGR	Omolola Rachael Asha
39	DF	NGR	Hope Olehi
40	MF	NGR	Precious Obasi

=== 2019-2020 League Season ===
The 2019-2020 team list as released by the club's management:

Note: Flags indicate national team as defined under FIFA eligibility rules; some limited exceptions apply. Players may hold more than one non-FIFA nationality.

No.	Pos.	Nation	Player
1	DF	NGR	Alice Zwalbong Poney
3	DF	NGR	Aishat Animashaun
4	MF	NGR	Esther Kareem
6	MF	NGR	Rahmat Damilola Omotosho
7	FW	NGR	Ngozi Blessing Ukwuoma
8	MF	NGR	Olamide Adugbe
9	MF	NGR	Rachael Omolola
10	MF	NGR	Grace Anuoluwapo Salisu (vice-captain)
12	MF	NGR	Tosin Ogundeko
13	MF	NGR	Nenrot Galadima Kitka
14	FW	NGR	Bukola Owoseni
15	DF	NGR	Oluwabunmi Oladeji
16	DF	NGR	Naomi Omotine Afemikhe
18	MF	NGR	Abosede Hawa
19	MF	NGR	Elizabeth Zirike

No.	Pos.	Nation	Player
20	DF	NGR	Hope Olehi
21	GK	NGR	Faith Omilana
22	MF	NGR	Sofiat Bankole
23	DF	NGR	Desire Iberaan Orlu
24	DF	NGR	Lola Agnes Ajibade
25	DF	NGR	Dorcas Effiong
27	DF	NGR	Judith Ada Osuagwu
28	DF	NGR	Judith Odinaka Nwaogu (captain)
29	DF	NGR	Rosemary Ochulor
30	FW	NGR	Gift Emmanuel
31	GK	NGR	Onyekachi Egobirioku Eze
32	DF	NGR	Rukewe Lucky
33	GK	NGR	Shukurat Ayomide Bakare
37	MF	NGR	Celestina Adaobi Ogunwa
40	DF	NGR	Precious Obasi

== Business development ==
DreamStar FC Ladies, owned by Dream Stars Sports Development Organisation, faces the common challenge of limited funding for a private soccer clubs in Africa. To develop the team into a professional club, the owner has hired a sports development consulting firm. The goal is to update the club's image and brand to attract sponsors and partners. This is part of a plan to remain in top-tier Nigerian and African soccer while working toward becoming a profitable organization. As a kick-off to the 2019–2020 season, the club owners have made two prominent changes.

Changes	Old	New
Change in Club name	Dream Stars Ladies	DreamStar FC Ladies
Change in Club logo	Old club logo from February 2012 till March 2020	New club logo from April 2020

Apart from listed changes, the club underwent internal process and team management changes that impacts on managing and technical improvement. Other notable improvement initiatives included design of a professional and engaging website, revamping and harmonising the social media pages, organising technical training and skills development for the coaching crew, building team psychology around the vision of the club, and establishing a supporters' club model to foster brand loyalty among Lagos fans.
