= Vincent Enyeama =

Nigerian footballer (born 1982)

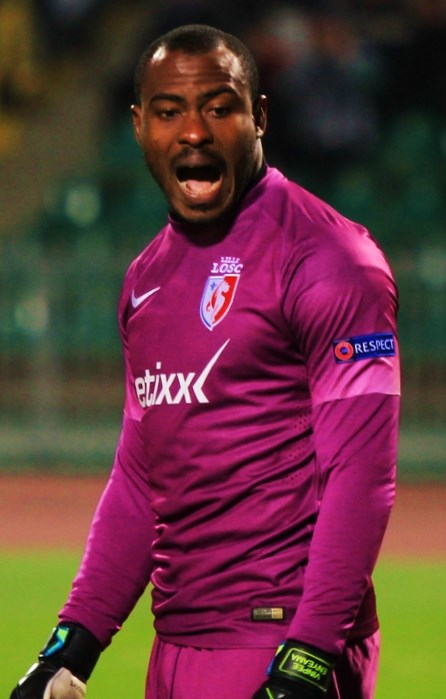
- Enyeama playing for Lille in 2014

Personal information
- Full name: Vincent Enyeama
- Date of birth: 29 August 1982 (age 44)
- Place of birth: Aba, Abia State, Nigeria
- Height: 1.80 m (5 ft 11 in)
- Position: Goalkeeper

Senior career*
Years	Team	Apps	(Gls)
1999–2001	Ibom Stars	56	(1)
2001–2004	Enyimba	100	(10)
2004–2005	Iwuanyanwu Nationale	36	(0)
2005–2007	Bnei Yehuda	56	(0)
2007–2011	Hapoel Tel Aviv	113	(9)
2011–2018	Lille	143	(0)
2012–2013	→ Maccabi Tel Aviv (loan)	27	(0)
Total		531	(20)

International career
2002–2015	Nigeria	101	(0)
Medal record
Men's football
Representing Nigeria
Africa Cup of Nations
Winner	2013 South Africa
- * Club domestic league appearances and goals

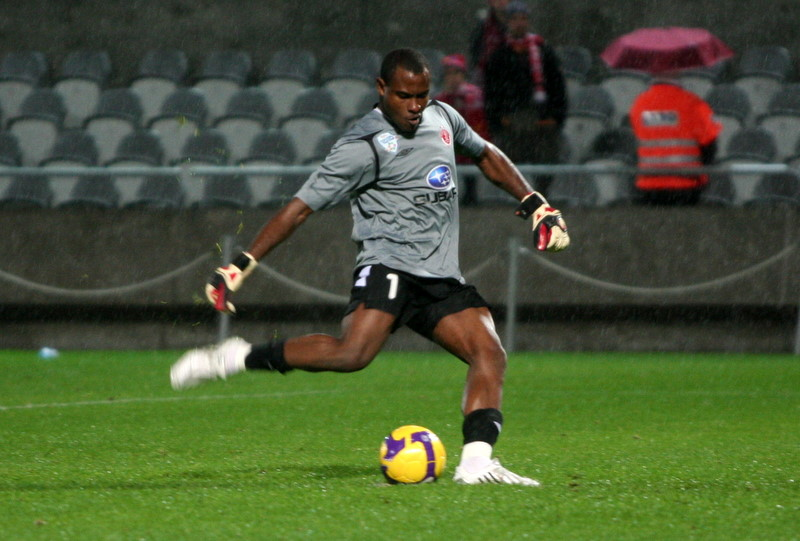
Vincent Enyeama playing for Hapoel Tel-Aviv

Vincent Enyeama MON (born 29 August 1982) is a Nigerian former professional footballer who played as a goalkeeper.

During his senior career, which spanned nearly 20 years, Enyeama played for Ibom Stars, Enyimba, Iwuanyanwu Nationale, Bnei Yehuda, Hapoel Tel Aviv, Lille and Maccabi Tel Aviv. He was also a member of the Nigeria national team from 2002 until October 2015, serving as its captain from 2013 until his retirement from international football in 2015. With 101 caps, he was Nigeria's most capped player until November 2021 when he was surpassed by Ahmed Musa.

== Club career ==
=== Enyimba ===
During his spell with Enyimba, he won the CAF Champions League twice, with one noteworthy distinction: He was always substituted before penalty shootouts. "I don't know why I was substituted before penalties, but it worked," he said in an interview in 2006. "In Israel I stopped many penalties and now everyone knows that I can handle penalties."

=== Bnei Yehuda ===
After three seasons with Enyimba International and one with Iwuanyanwu Nationale (now known as Heartland), Enyeama moved to the Israeli club Bnei Yehuda Tel Aviv. In his first season, the team qualified for the final of the Israel State Cup and, having finished fourth in the Israeli Premier League, for the 2006 UEFA Cup competition as well.

=== Hapoel Tel Aviv ===
Enyeama signed for Hapoel Tel Aviv in 2007. Hapoel endured a poor season in 2007/2008, but Enyeama helped the team avoid relegation and reach the state cup final.

During the 2008–09 season, Enyeama became Hapoel's penalty kicker, won the "Player of The Year" award, and just missed out on leading Hapoel to the league title.

In the 2009–10 season, Hapoel won the league and cup double, with Enyeama featuring prominently. He scored a goal in the Cup Final but missed a penalty in the last fixture of the year, which Hapoel eventually won by scoring in the 92nd minute, thereby capturing the league title.

On 18 August 2010, he scored his first goal of the 2010–11 season with a penalty against Red Bull Salzburg in the Champions League qualifiers.

Enyeama played well on the Champions League Group Stage, especially against Lyon and Schalke 04. Hapoel also won the Israeli cup again.

=== Lille ===
In June 2011, Enyeama moved to French side Lille for an undisclosed fee on a three-year contract. He made his debut on 18 October 2011 against Inter Milan in the 2012 UEFA Champions League group stage, where Inter managed a 1–0 victory.

In August 2012, Enyeama agreed a one-year loan deal with Maccabi Tel Aviv and was presented to the media by Maccabi's Sports Director Jordi Cruyff on 8 August 2012. He appeared in 27 Israeli Premier League fixtures and Maccabi went on to win the championship title.

During the 2013–14 Ligue 1 season, club manager René Girard picked Enyeama as his first-choice goalkeeper ahead of Steeve Elana, who had previously been the first-choice goalkeeper under Rudi Garcia. With the help of his two centre-backs, Marko Baša and Simon Kjær, Enyeama kept 11 consecutive clean sheets in Ligue 1 matches during the first half of the season. On 8 December 2013, Enyeama finally conceded a goal after playing 1,062 minutes of Ligue 1 football in an away match against Bordeaux, during which he was beaten by Landry N'Guémo's deflected strike in the 27th minute. He thus came within 114 minutes of equalling Gaëtan Huard's Ligue 1 goalkeeping record, set in 1993, of playing 1,176 minutes without conceding a goal.

In the 2017–18 season, Enyeama did not make a league appearance having been left out of the first team due to "a disagreement between the player and the club's management". He joined the first team's pre-season training in July 2018.

He was released by mutual consent on 31 August 2018. In January 2019 he said he was keen to play again, and in July 2019 he went on trial with French club Dijon. Despite not being offered a contract by Dijon he expressed gratitude to the club. While at the start of the 2019–20 season Enyeama stated that he hoped to find a new club and continue playing, he finally retired after the end of the campaign.

== International career ==
After making his debut for the Nigeria national team against Kenya in May 2002, Enyeama was selected for the 2002 FIFA World Cup as a cover for Ike Shorunmu. He made his competitive debut in that tournament, keeping a clean sheet against England in the third group match. After the retirement of Shorunmu, he became the first-choice goalkeeper for the national team, helping the Super Eagles to third place finishes in the 2004, 2006, 2010 Africa Cup of Nations tournaments, and captaining the team to victory of in the 2013 edition. He has also participated in the 2010 and 2014 FIFA World Cups, and the 2013 FIFA Confederations Cup.

In the 2006 Africa Cup of Nations, Enyeama stopped three kicks in the quarter-final penalty shootout against Tunisia but could not prevent a loss to Ivory Coast in the semi-final. In the 2010 tournament, he was again Nigeria's shootout hero at the quarter-final stage, saving from Zambia's Thomas Nyrienda and scoring the winning kick himself.

Enyeama made his second FIFA World Cup appearance in the 2010 tournament in South Africa. He was named man of the match in Nigeria's first game of the tournament, a defiant display that restricted Argentina to a 1–0 win. Enyeama, who was playing his 56th international for the Super Eagles, made six fine saves against the two-time world champions, four of them from Lionel Messi. Argentine coach Diego Maradona praised him as the reason Messi was not able to score a goal. Enyeama was also awarded man of the match in the team's next fixture, a 2–1 loss to Greece but was at fault for Vasilis Torosidis' winning goal.

At the 2013 Africa Cup of Nations, Enyeama deputised for regular captain Joseph Yobo, who stayed on the bench for most of the competition. On 10 February, Enyeama led Nigeria to its third continental victory, keeping a clean sheet in a 1–0 defeat of Burkina Faso in the 2013 Africa Cup of Nations Final. He was named to the team of the tournament as first choice goalkeeper, conceding only four goals in six matches.

In June 2014, Enyeama was named in Nigeria's squad for the 2014 FIFA World Cup. In the Super Eagles' first fixture, he kept the second FIFA World Cup clean sheet of his career as Nigeria drew 0–0 with Iran. He subsequently recorded a second consecutive shutout in the fixture against Bosnia and Herzegovina, a 1–0 win which gave Nigeria its first win at the tournament since the 1998 edition. He conceded three goals in the last match of the first round against Argentina, a game which ended in a 3–2 defeat for Nigeria, placing them second in the group and thus qualifying them for the second round for the first time in 16 years.

On 26 March 2015, Enyeama won his 100th cap for Nigeria in a 1–0 loss to Uganda. He retired from international football on 8 October 2015.

== Player profile ==
=== Style of play ===
An athletic and agile goalkeeper, Enyeama was known in particular for his excellent reflexes and shot-stopping ability, which enabled him to produce spectacular saves, and made him effective in the air, despite not being particularly tall for a goalkeeper, standing at 1.80 m (5 ft 11 in). He was also known for his speed when rushing off his line, which made him strong in one-on-one situations. He was less adept at dealing with crosses however, which led pundits to question his handling and ability to command his area. In addition to his goalkeeping ability, he also stood out for his leadership qualities throughout his career, and his ability to organise his defence.

=== Legacy ===
Enyeama is regarded as one of the greatest African goalkeepers of all time and one of the greatest Black goalkeepers of all time. In 2023, he was ranked the greatest African goalkeeper in history by the IFFHS. He was also considered to be one of the best goalkeepers in Ligue 1 in his prime.

== Personal life ==
Enyeama is a Christian. He is married and a father of three.

In 2004, he was involved in a car accident in Uyo, Akwa Ibom State southern Nigeria, in which two motorcycle passengers were killed. The driver of the car in which Enyeama was travelling was left in critical condition. Despite the severity of the accident, Enyeama suffered only bruises after the car somersaulted twice as it swerved to avoid the motorbike.

His son Godswill Enyeama signed for Lille academy in 2024. A 1.94 m (6 ft 4 1/2 in) goalkeeper, he grew up in France where his father moved in 2011. Godswill first played for Lille area amateur club Croix for eight years before joining his father's former professional club.

== Honours ==
Enyimba

- Nigerian Premier League: 2001, 2002, 2003
- CAF Champions League: 2003, 2004

Hapoel Tel-Aviv

- Israeli Premier League: 2009–10
- Israel State Cup: 2009–10, 2010–11

Maccabi Tel-Aviv

- Israeli Premier League: 2012–13

Nigeria

- Africa Cup of Nations: 2013

Individual

- CAF Champions League Player of the Year: 2003, 2004
- Footballer of the Year in Israel: 2009
- UNFP Player of the Month: October 2013, November 2013
- Prix Marc-Vivien Foé: 2013–14
- Africa Cup of Nations Team of the Tournament: 2004, 2013
- Goalkeeper of the year Nigeria Pitch Awards: 2013, 2014
- King of the pitch Nigeria Pitch Awards: 2014
- Goal Nigeria Player of the Year: 2014
- IFFHS CAF Men's Team of the Decade 2011–2020
- IFFHS 2023 March: Greatest African Goalkeeper of all Time.

Orders

- Member of the Order of the Niger

== See also ==
- List of men's footballers with 100 or more international caps
