= Felix Anyansi-Agwu =

Nigerian football administrator

Felix Anyansi-Agwu is a Nigerian football administrator who has served as Chairman of Enyimba International F.C. since 1999. Under his leadership, Enyimba International has since risen from a relatively unknown club to one of Africa's most successful clubs. He was recently appointed Vice President of the Nigeria Football Federation (NFF).

== Accolades ==
- 2003 CAF Awards – African Football Manager of the Year
- 2004 CAF Awards – African Football Manager of the Year
- 1st Nigeria Pitch Awards – Manager of the Year
- 2nd Nigeria Pitch Awards – Manager of the Year
