= Toyin Ibitoye =

Nigerian sports analyst and journalist

Toyin Ibitoye is a Nigerian sports analyst and journalist who currently works for Channels TV. An alumnus of the University of Ibadan and the Nelson Mandela Metropolitan University, On 18 March 2015, Ibitoye was appointed as Media Officer of the Nigeria national football team by the Nigeria Football Federation.

== Accolades ==
- 2013 Nigerian Broadcasters Merit Awards – Most Popular TV Sports Presenter (Male)
- 1st Nigeria Pitch Awards – Football Journalist of the Year (TV)
- 2nd Nigeria Pitch Awards – Football Journalist of the Year (TV)
