= Ade Ojeikere =

Nigerian sports analyst and columnist

Ade Ojeikere is a Nigerian sports analyst and columnist who works as a sports editor for The Nation Newspaper after a stint with ThisDay Newspaper. On November 16, 2013, he won the "Football Journalist of the Year (Print)" category at the 1st Nigeria Pitch Awards.
