= Michael Ede =

British Nigerian football agent (born 1975)

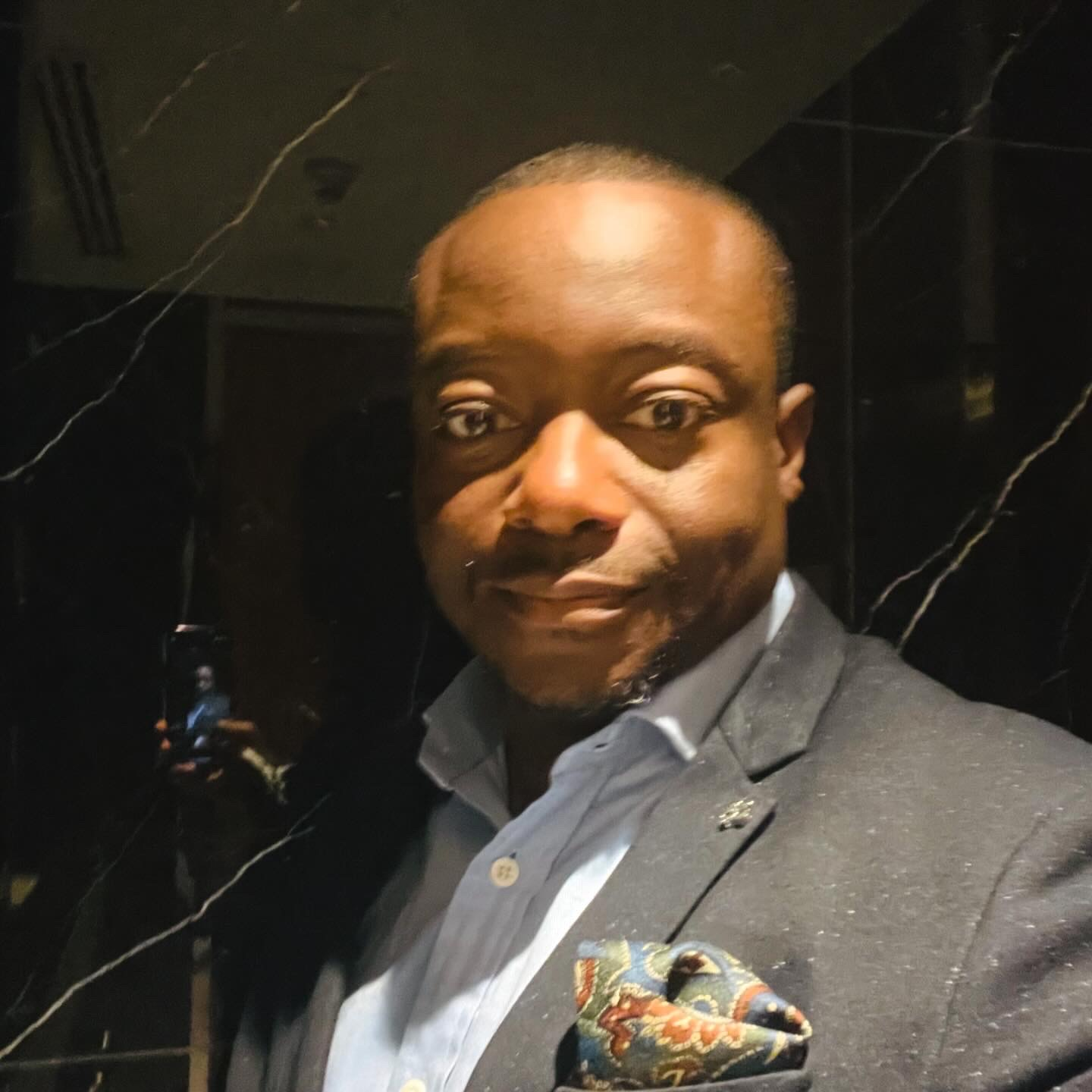
- Michael Ede in 2023
- Born: Michael Maigeri Ede; 3 March 1975 (age 51)
- Citizenship: British, Nigerian
- Education: University of Jos, Nigeria (BSc) Manchester Metropolitan University (MBA)
- Occupations: Sports agent, entrepreneur, writer, author
- Notable work: One Shot (2023)
- Political party: Conservative
- Spouse: Sarah Ede (m. 2016)
- Children: 2
- Website: https://www.michaelede.com

Michael Maigeri Ede (born 3 March 1975) is a British Nigerian football agent, author and entrepreneur. He is a registered intermediary with the Football Association (FA) in the United Kingdom. He is the founder of Uplift11 Sports – a sports agency representing and intermediating on behalf of footballers and coaches. His debut book, One Shot, an anthology of his articles, was published by Maple Publishers on 3 March 2023. One Shot was described in the Vanguard as "a comprehensive guide to building and sustaining a successful business in the modern era." The book became No. 1 Amazon International Bestseller in the US, Canada, Australia and the United Kingdom.

== Early life ==
Ede is the son of Honourable John Ede, a senator with the Second Nigerian Republic House of Assembly and Awidi Ede his mum. He was born and raised in Nigeria before moving to the United Kingdom to complete his studies and raising a family in the UK.

== Education and career ==
Ede attended University of Jos, Nigeria and obtained a Bachelor of Science degree in Biochemistry. He then relocated to the United Kingdom for further studies where he obtained a master's degree in Business Administration (MBA) from the Manchester Metropolitan University Business School. His specialisation from the MBA in 2011 was in strategy, entrepreneurship and international business.

Having completed his master's degree led Ede to work at firms including HSBC, Barclays, Capgemini, WiPro Technologies, Bank of Ireland and AstraZeneca. It also helped him build a strong reputation in the IT industry and propelling him to set up an IT consulting and management firm in 2013, Maigmike Consulting. Ede also obtained his Football Agent Professional certification from John Viola Academy and completed Players Scouting Level 1 training with S4 Scouting Professional Football Recruitment, UK. Ede has been featured in several publications, including Forbes, Guardian, Vanguard, New Telegraph, ThisDay, The Sun Nigeria amongst others.

=== Career as an agent ===
In 2020, Ede finally laid the foundations for Uplift11 Sports – a sports management agency. This firm became the incubator that bridges the gap between talent and opportunity for those athletes who lacked resources.

Through his sports agency, Ede has worked with some notable footballers and coaches. Players like Charlevy Mabiala, Tonći Kukoč, Lugiani Gallardo, and Lewis Horner are part of his clients representation. He currently represents coaches like Emanuele Ferraro and Sergey Matveev amongst others.

=== Article contributions ===
Ede has written, published and contributed to articles on Forbes about becoming a sports agent: the duties, skills, career path and earnings behind sports biggest names. He also wrote on lessons people in business can learn about winning from the different approaches and temperaments of Lewis Hamilton v Nico Rosberg in 2016 Formula One world championship. He has collaborated with Forbes expert panels on common body language mistakes to avoid when communicating with people and on how to break out of a career rut. He also contributed on tips for hiring the right job candidates and how SMBs can keep up with data privacy laws. He was interviewed by BBC Andrew Wood on BBC Business News on "how the business of football work" in the current transfer season 2022 in the Premier League. His latest article on Forbes was on how business leaders can use lessons learnt from remote working brought about by the COVID-19 pandemic to improve their team's productivity. Working with Forbes expert panels, he contributed on how business leaders and entrepreneurs can successfully build their brand awareness. He also contributed working with these Forbes experts on how to overcome daily distractions faced by business leaders using the best advice for overcoming these distractions or avoiding them altogether. Further work with these Forbes experts, Ede explained how entrepreneurs can incorporate hacks into their own lives to manage their time while accomplishing more throughout their day-to-day activities. He also elucidated on how business leaders have much to learn from the mental and emotional lessons of sports. Together with Forbes expert panels, Ede shared strategies that he found helpful for maintaining a thriving business in changing times; which is setting S.M.A.R.T. (specific, measurable, achievable, relevant and timely) goals. Ede contributed on simple ways to increase financial literacy as a business owner together with other Forbes business members, he suggested that entrepreneurs making time for educational resources can increase their financial literacy and better understand their business operations. He discussed with Forbes panel experts that having a strategic objective is one of the best tips for improving customer acquisition. On QR codes and how this technology can be incorporated into the marketing campaign for businesses, working with other Forbes panel experts, Ede stressed that making a QR code a social experience is one of the smart ways to leverage QR codes for businesses. As an executive contributor to Brainz Magazine, Ede wrote an article on the role that money plays in the sports industry. He wrote on ten talents and competencies that govern successful entrepreneurial ideology in 2022. Ede also wrote on Forbes about how formal education can influence how sports agents operate in the 21st century. On Forbes, he explored how technology is impacting the sporting world and how business leaders as a whole can leverage it to their advantage. He wrote on Forbes how personal branding has become a powerful tool in sports management. In another article on Forbes, reiterated how positive thinking can become a transformative force that can revolutionise the way business leaders navigate their day-to-day operations.

== Awards and memberships ==
=== Awards ===
- Nigeria Pitch Awards – Player's Agent of the Year 2019
- 2022 Men Leaders to look up to by the Passion Vista Magazine
- Selected as Top CEO & Sports agent of the Year for 2023 for outstanding leadership, dedication and commitment to the industry by the International Association of Top Professionals (IAOTP) The award photo inset on Nasdaq billboard at Times Square, NYC.

=== Memberships ===
He is a member of the following professional bodies:

- Association of MBAs (AMBA)
- Forbes Business Council
- Professional Football Agents Association (ProFAA)
- The Football Association (FA) – Registered Intermediary
- Hilton Honors (Diamond)
- Conservative Party
- International Association of Top Professionals (IAOTP)

== Personal life ==
In September 2016, Ede married Sarah Ede, a British Nigerian business analyst (née Ejiama) and together they have a daughter and a son. They reside in London, UK. He is a supporter of Arsenal F.C.

Ede and his wife raise funds for their charity – the Great Ormond Street Hospital Children's Charity. He is a member of the Conservative Party and was a supporter of Rishi Sunak, the former Prime minister of the United Kingdom.

== Bibliography ==
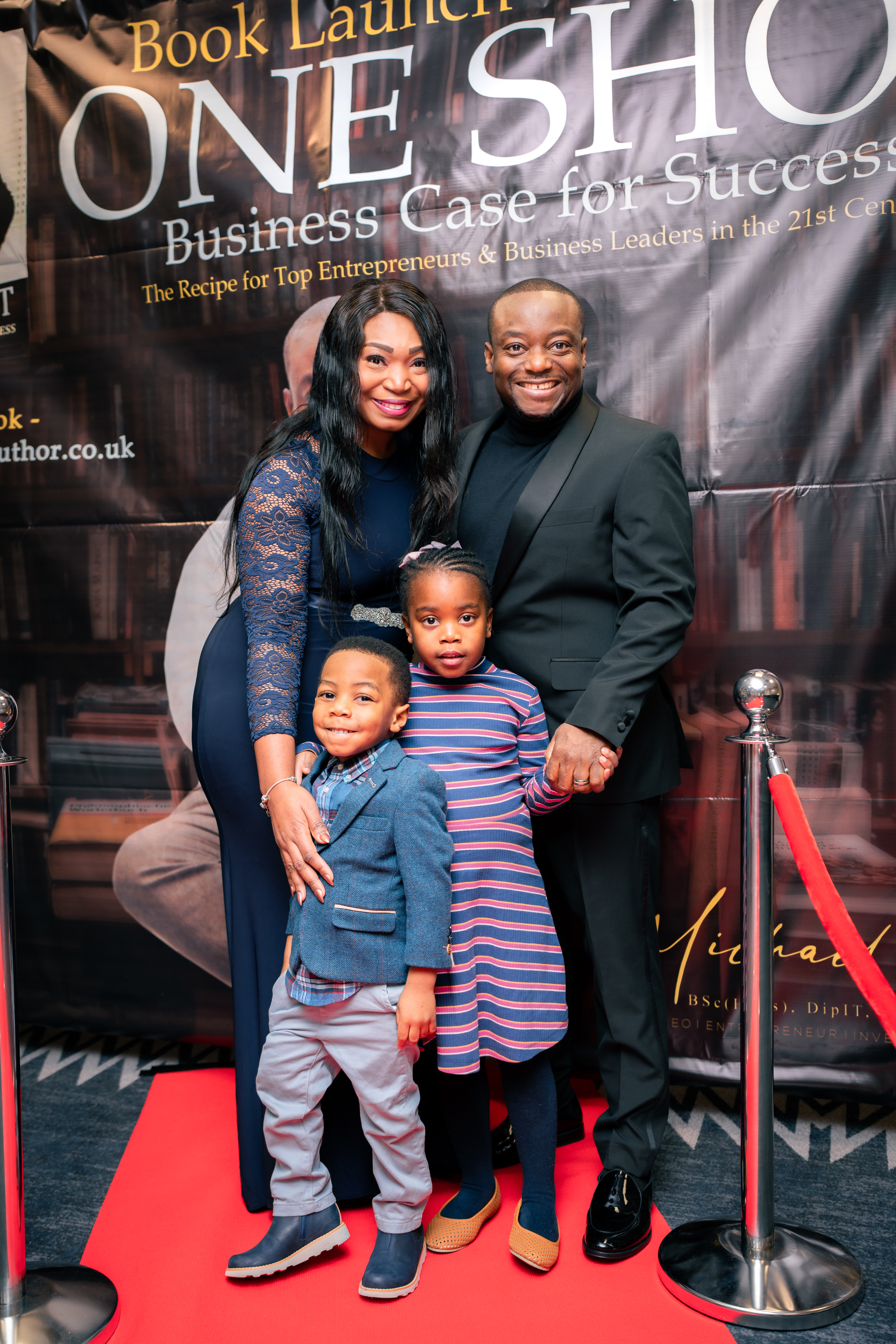
- Ede with his family at the book launch of his debut book - One Shot (2023)
  Ede, Michael (2023). One Shot (Business Case for Success) The Recipe for Top Entrepreneurs & Business Leaders in the 21st Century, Milton Keynes, UK: Maple Publishers. Following the book's global re-launch, One Shot soared to the top of Amazon International Bestseller lists, ranking No. 1 in the USA, Canada, United Kingdom, and Australia.
- Paperback, ISBN 978-1-915796-30-1
- Hardback, ISBN 978-1-915796-31-8
- Ebook, ISBN 978-1-91579632-5

=== Audiobooks ===
- Ede, Michael (2023): One Shot (Business Case for Success) narrated by Frank Block on Audible (Categories: Biographies & Memoirs), Amazon, ASIN B0BV473X3R and iTunes.
