= NWFL =

NWFL can stand for:

- Nigeria Women Football League, an association football league in Nigeria.
- North West Football League, an Australian rules football competition in Tasmania.
