= Rafiat Sule =

Nigerian footballer

Personal information
- Full name: Rafiat Folakemi Sule
- Date of birth: 3 August 2000 (age 26)
- Place of birth: Kaduna, Nigeria
- Position: Forward

Team information
- Current team: Pink Sport Bari
- Number: 17

Senior career*
Years	Team	Apps	(Gls)
- Jagunmolu FC
2015–2017	Bayelsa Queens	24	(31)
2017–2019	Rivers Angels	27	(17)
2019–2020	Bayelsa Queens	10	(11)
2020–	Pink Sport Bari	13	(0)

International career
2018-2019	Nigeria national team	5	(3)
- * Club domestic league appearances and goals

Rafiat Folakemi Sule (born 3 August 2000), is a Nigerian professional footballer who plays as a forward at club level for the Bari-based A.S.D. Pink Sport Time, in Italian Serie A. She previously donned the colours of Rivers Angels, and was top scorer in the league for two consecutive seasons. She has been described as "technically sound" with a sharp eye for goals from all distance.

== Club career ==
During the 2015 season, Sule scored 11 goals in the league and two goals in the Federations Cup. She dedicated her golden boot to her deceased father and to her teammates for the motivation, describing the award as a sign that she was on the right path to realize her dreams. In 2016, her performance for Bayelsa Queens led to her nomination for the May 2016 player of the month. In March 2017, Sule, alongside Cecilia Nku, Halimatu Ayinde and Tochukwu Oluehi, were signed by Rivers Angels.

At the 2017 Ladies in Sports conference, Sule was honoured for her outstanding performance during the previous season.

She joined the Italian Serie A A.S.D. Pink Sport Time team based in Bari in August 2020.

== International career ==
In February 2018, Sule was invited to the camp of the Nigerian national team ahead of the WAFU Cup in Côte d'Ivoire, but did not make the final squad list.

== Honours ==
- 2015 top scorer
- 2016 top scorer
- Nigeria Pitch Awards - Most valuable player in 2016 Nigeria Women Premier League
