= Christopher Danjuma =

Football coach

Christopher Musa Danjuma is the head coach of Nasarawa Amazons in the Nigeria Women Premier League. Since August 2017, he has been doubling as the coach of Nigeria women's national under-20 football team following his recommendation and subsequent appointment by Nigeria Football Federation. He previously coached Nigeria women's national football team, after the sack of Edwin Okon in June 2015. He was relieved of his duty after 2015 African Games, with Florence Omagbemi later occupying the vacant managerial role in February 2016.
