= COD United Amazons F.C. =

COD United Amazons
- Full name: City of David United Amazons Football Club of Lagos
- Nickname(s): The Amazons
- Founded: 2013
- Ground: Teslim Balogun Stadium; Agege Stadium; Onikan Stadium
- Owner: Redeemed Christian Church of God (City of David parish)
- Manager: Ann Chiejine
- League: Nigerian Women Premier League

COD United Amazons F.C., (also called COD United Ladies F.C) is a Nigerian women's association football club based in Lagos State. It is owned by the City of David parish of Redeemed Christian Church of God, a body that also governs the men's arm of the team, COD United F.C. They won the Lagos Women's FA cup in 2015 and represented the state at the national level. They presently compete in the Nigeria Women Premier League, the first in the COD United affiliated teams to gain promotion to an elite division.

The Amazons have contributed to the national team of Nigeria at international tournaments. Vivian Ikechukwu, Patience Dike, Nkechi Agamz and Grace Marcus have been part of the Under-17 squad of Nigeria at the World cup.

In February 2016, former Super Falcons captain and coach, Uche Eucharia was appointed head coach of the Amazons.

== Current squad ==
Squad list for 2016 season.
Note: Flags indicate national team as defined under FIFA eligibility rules; some limited exceptions apply. Players may hold more than one non-FIFA nationality.

No.	Pos.	Nation	Player
1	GK	NGA	Oshobukola Omowunmi
2	DF	NGA	Oyesanya Sherifat
3	DF	NGA	Omosuyi Ayowunmi
7	DF	NGA	Omowodun Adeola
8	DF	NGA	Onah Oluchi
10	FW	NGA	Monday Gift
11	FW	NGA	Moses Nkechi
12	MF	NGA	Obioma Bella
13	FW	NGA	Marcus Grace Edike
12	MF	NGA	Moka Sylvia

No.	Pos.	Nation	Player
14	DF	NGA	Ikono Hannah
16	DF	NGA	Aweda Rafiat
19	GK	NGA	Ibadin Mary
20	DF	NGA	Ibeh Chinonye
26	DF	NGA	Adamu Asebe
27	FW	NGA	Agbonze Endurance
34	FW	NGA	Anoruo Chiwendu

== Management ==
- Executive Director: Deji Tinubu
- Chief Executive: Shola Opaleye
- Manager: Ann Chiejine

== Honours ==
- 2015 Lagos State Women's FA Cup winners
