= Edwin Okon =

Nigerian football coach (b.1970)

Personal information
- Full name: Edwin Edem Okon
- Date of birth: 19 October 1970 (age 56)
- Place of birth: Cross River State

Team information
- Current team: Ibom Angels (Head Coach)

Managerial career
- Years: Team
- Nigeria (assistant)
- 2012: Nigeria U20 (Head Coach)
- ?–present: Rivers Angels (Head Coach)
- 2013–2015: Nigeria (Head Coach)

Edwin Edem Okon (born 19 October 1970) is the head coach of Ibom Angels. Born in Cross River State, Okon got a coaching certificate from the sport institute in Lagos State. Following the failure of Nigeria to win the 2012 African Women's Championship, and the subsequent resignation of coach Kadiri Ikhana, Okon was appointed interim head coach of the Super Falcons in 2013.

Nigeria's failure to advance to the knockout-round at the 2015 FIFA Women's World Cup led to the sack of Okon by the Nigeria Football Federation and was replaced by his assistant, Christopher Danjuma on an interim basis.

== Honours ==
=== Domestic ===
As manager of Rivers Angels F.C.

==== League ====
- 2012 Nigeria Women Premier League – runners-up
- 2013 Nigeria Women Premier League – runners-up
- 2014 Nigeria Women Premier League – winners
- 2015 Nigeria Women Premier League – winners
- 2016 Nigeria Women Premier League – winners

==== Cup ====
- 2012 Federation Cup – winners
- 2013 Federation Cup – winners
- 2014 Federation Cup – winners
- 2016 Federation Cup – winners

=== International ===
- 2012 FIFA U-20 Women's World Cup – fourth place
- 2014 African Women's Championship – winners
