= Remo Stars Ladies F.C. =

Women's football club in Ikenne, Nigeria

Remo Stars
- Full name: Remo Stars Ladies Football club
- Nickname: The Sky Blues
- Founded: 2022; 4 years ago
- Ground: Remo Stars Stadium
- Capacity: 5,000
- Owner: Kunle Soname
- League: NWFL Premiership
- 2025–26: Regular season: 6th, Group B
- Website: remostarsfc.com

Remo Stars Ladies Football Club is a Nigerian women's football team based in Ikenne. They serve as the female counterpart of the men's club, Remo Stars F.C. The club is part of the Remo Stars Sports Club and competes in various Nigerian women's football competitions. The current head coach of the club is Wemimo Mathew.

== History ==
Remo Stars Ladies F.C. was established 2022, following the success of the Remo Stars men's team. The club was created to promote women's football in Ogun State and provide a platform for young female talents to showcase their skills on a professional level.

The team quickly gained recognition due to its affiliation with the well-organized Remo Stars Football Club, known for its youth development programs and state-of-the-art facilities.

== Stadium ==
Remo Stars Ladies play their home games at the Remo Stars Stadium in Ikenne, which has a seating capacity of approximately 5000. The stadium features modern facilities, making it one of the best football venues in Nigeria.

== Affiliations ==
Parent Club: Remo Stars Football Club

The club operates a youth development system for female football players.

== Honours ==
- Sheroes Cup: 2024
