= Agege Stadium =

Sports venue in Lagos, Nigeria

Coordinates: 6°38′33″N 3°19′28″E

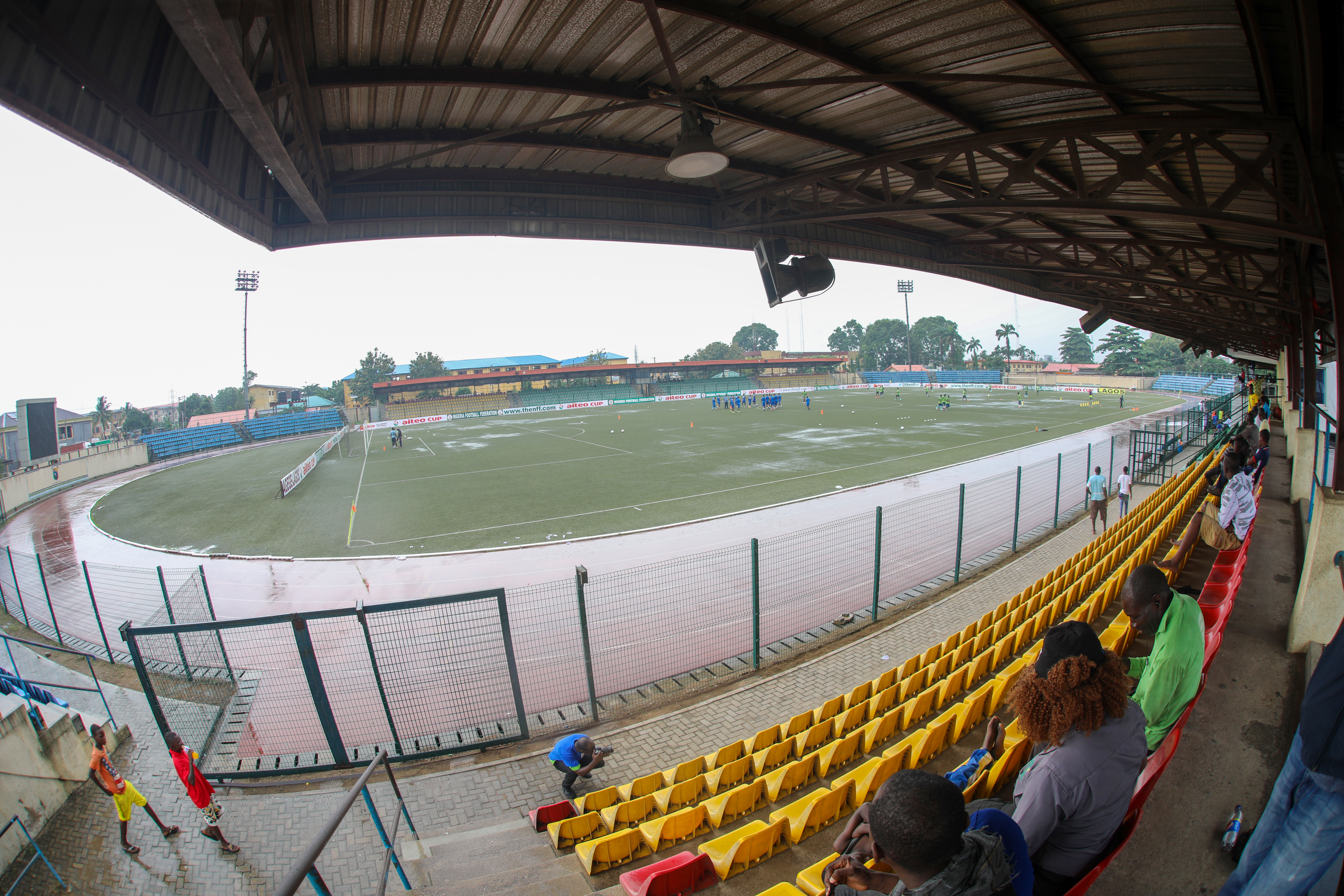
- View of the stadium
- Interactive map of Agege Stadium
- Full name: Agege Stadium
- Location: Lagos, Nigeria, Nigeria
- Capacity: 4,000 (football)
- Surface: Grass

Tenants
- Nigeria women's national under-17 football team & MFM F.C.

Agege Stadium is a multi-purpose stadium in Lagos, Nigeria. It has a seating capacity of 4,000. It is the home ground of MFM F.C., Nigeria women's national under-17 football team and since 2018, of DreamStar F.C. Ladies.

State Government of Lagos says that efforts are being made to complete their up-gradation of the stadium in February, as reported by the Nigerian news agency.

The Lagos Stadium is home to Nigeria Women Premier League club DreamStar F.C. Ladies, and Nigeria Premier League Club MFM, who represented the country at the 2017 CAF Champion League, along with Plateau United.

The Verified Creative House, marketing and branding company, held its trade fair in Agege stadium, in Agege Local Government Area of Lagos State, from July 1-7.

== Environment ==
The stadium is in a clean environment and its infrastructures are constantly maintained to meet international standards. The stadium has been known to host different international sporting competition.

== Gallery ==
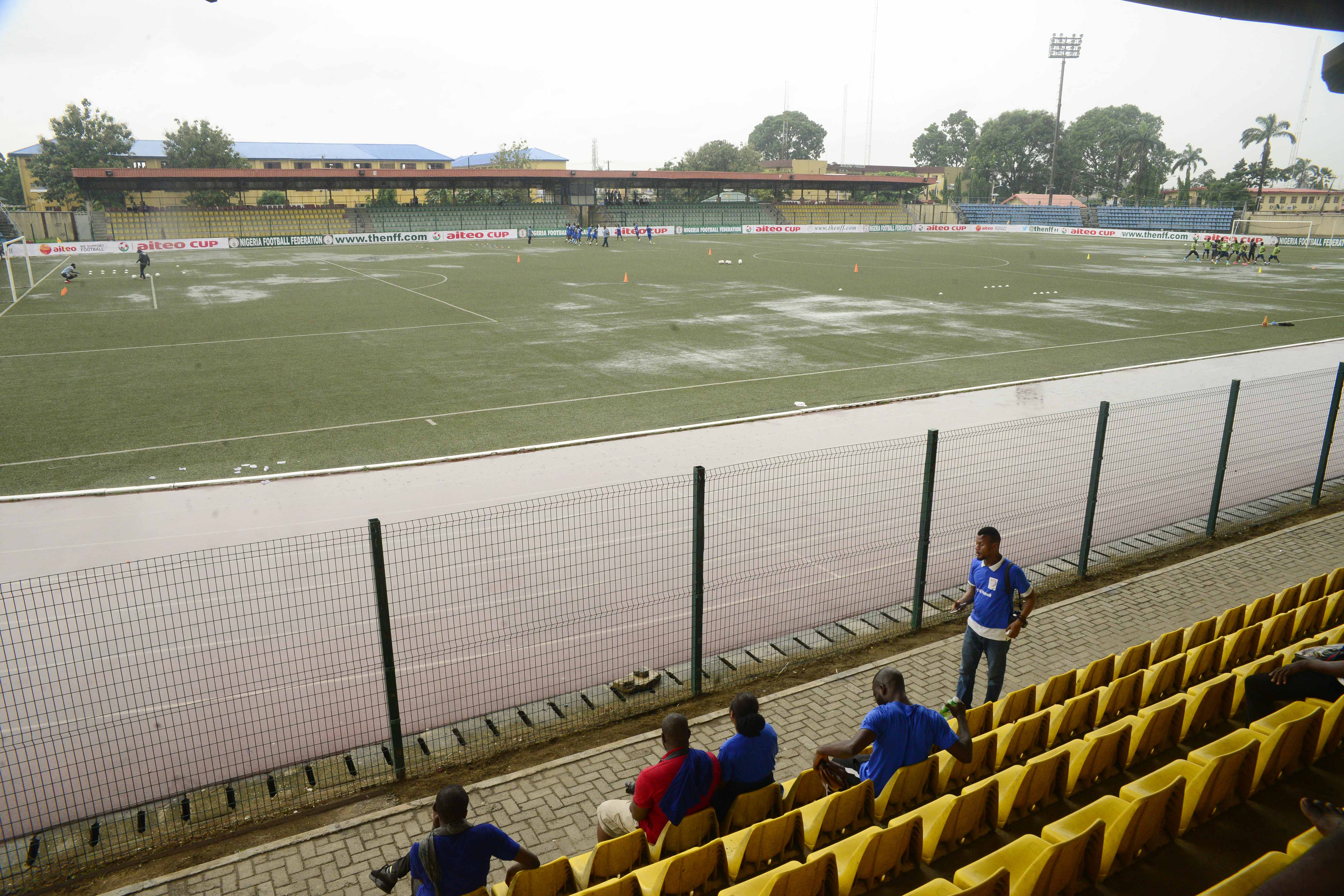

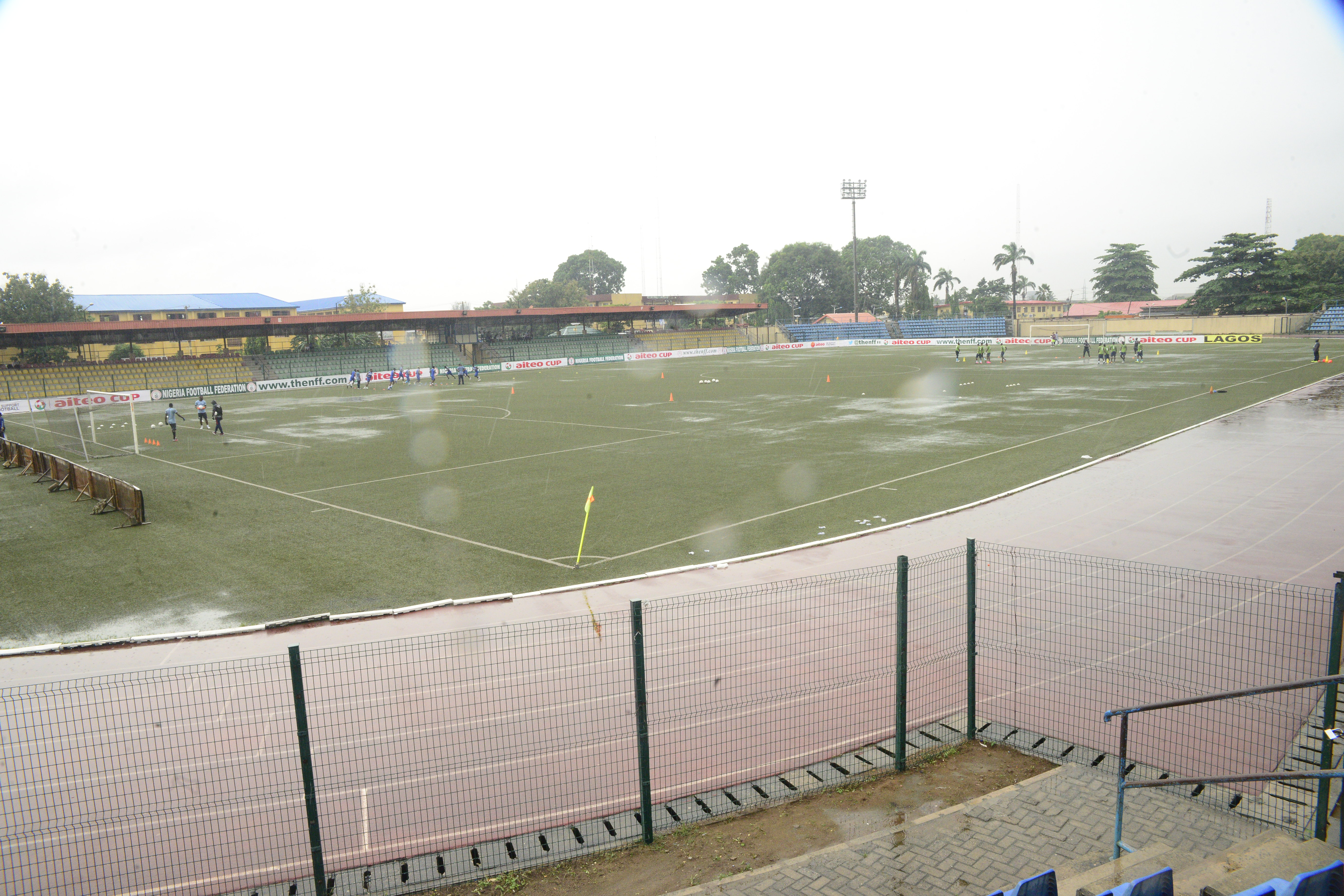

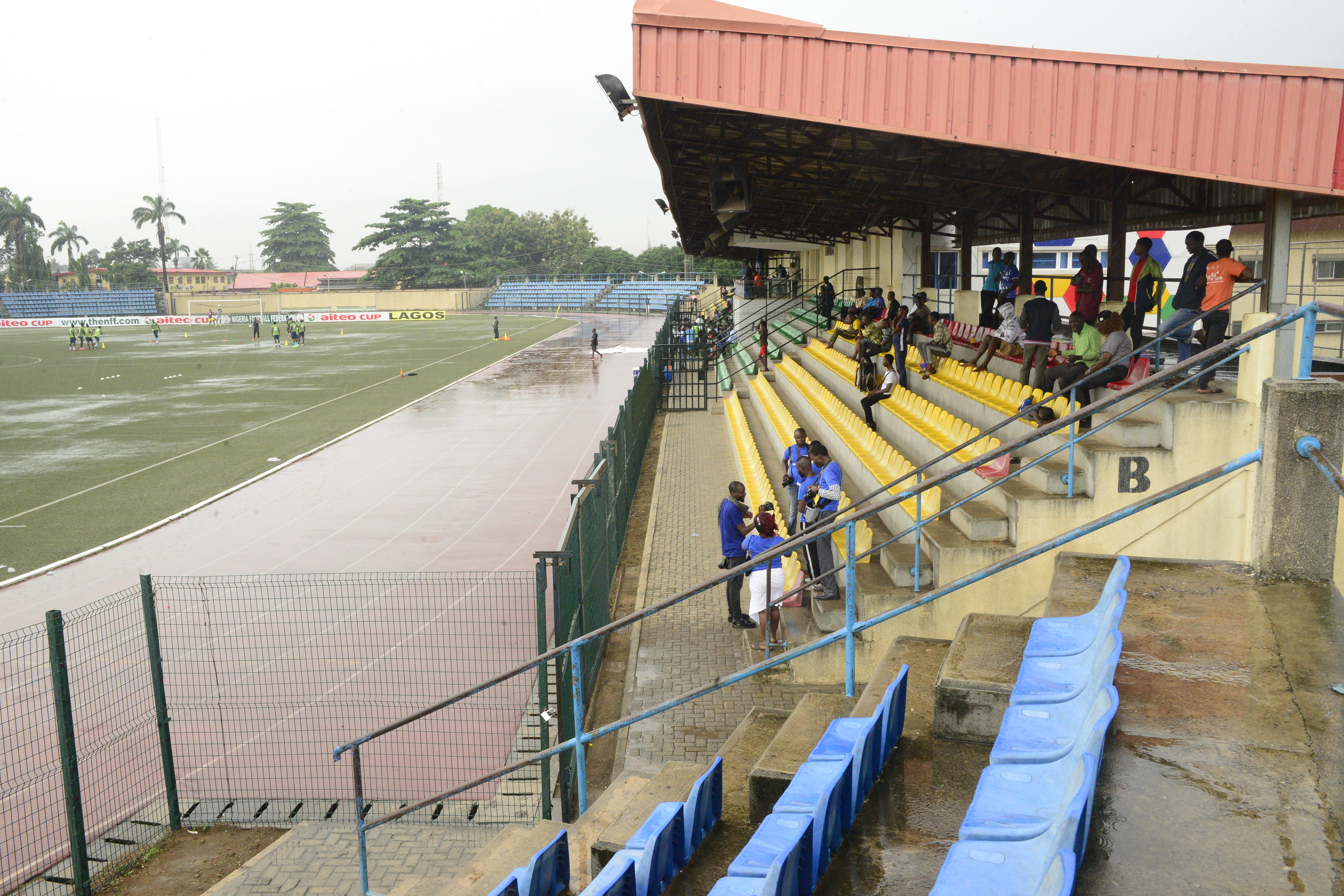

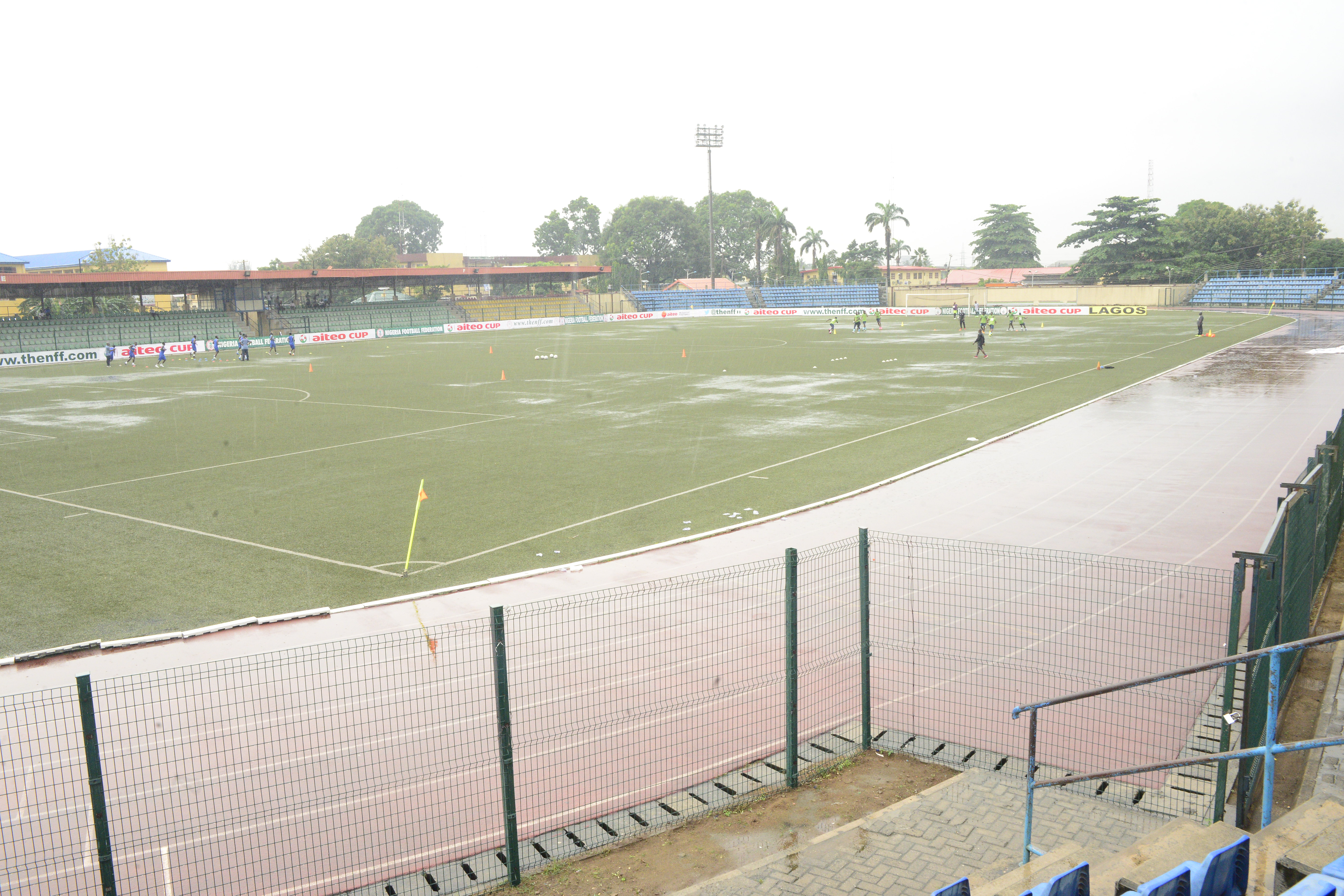

== See also ==
- List of football stadiums in Nigeria
