= Joy Jegede =

Nigerian footballer

Personal information
- Date of birth: 16 December 1991 (age 34)
- Position: Defender

Senior career*
Years	Team	Apps	(Gls)
- Bobruichanka Bobruisk
2015-	Delta Queens		

International career^{‡}
- Nigeria
- * Club domestic league appearances and goals ‡ National team caps and goals as of 11 October 2014 (before the 2012 African Women's Championship)

Joy Jegede (born 16 December 1991) is a Nigerian international footballer who plays as a defender. She is a member of the Nigeria women's national football team, and previously of the under-20 side. She was part of the team at the 2012 African Women's Championship. On club level, she captains Nigerian-based Delta Queens, and previously played for Bobruichanka Bobruisk in Belarus.

== Career ==
=== Club ===
Joy Jegede was one of several Nigerian players in the squad of Bobruichanka Bobruisk, of the Belarusian Premier League. Nigerian fullback Queen Ejovwo Willian praised Jegede for making her feel accepted when she joined the side. Since at least 2015, Jegede has played for Nigerian-based Delta Queens. She is the captain of the team.

=== International ===
Jegede was the captain of the Nigeria women's national under-20 football team at the 2010 FIFA U-20 Women's World Cup, where the team ended up being defeated by Germany in the final. Jegede soon moved onto the senior team, including being called up for the squad for qualifiers for the 2012 Summer Olympics in London, United Kingdom. She also formed part of the squad for the African Women's Championship that year.

She has not been a permanent fixture in the national side, but was recalled once again for the qualifiers against Equatorial Guinea in 2015 for the following Olympic Games. She has continued to be involved in the national side since, being called up to the team for the 2016 Africa Women Cup of Nations.

== Personal ==
Jegede is the daughter of PA Jegede, a former superintendent of police.
