= 2014 Nigeria Women Premier League =

Nigeria Women Premier League
- Champions: Rivers Angels
- Promoted: Martins White Doves, FC Robo, COD Ladies, State House Queens
- Relegated: None
- Goals: 252
- Top goalscorer: Amarachi Orjinma 17 goals
- Biggest home win: Rivers Angels 5, Osun Babes 1 (5 April)
- Biggest away win: Bayelsa Queens 0, Osun Babes 3 (12 April)
- Highest scoring: Edo Queens 4, Pelican Stars 2 (19 Jul); Rivers Angels 5, Osun Babes 1 (5 April)
- Longest unbeaten run: Rivers Angels - 11 games (Week 1 to 17 with 5 games postponed)

The 2014 Nigeria Women Premier League began on 1 March 2014 and ended on 26 November 2014. Nasarawa Amazons were the defending champions. This will be the first time in recent times that the winner will be decided straightaway without a mini super tournament at the end of the season.

== Format ==
The Nigeria Women Football League board announced before the commencement of the league that there shall be no super-6 league at the end of the season. It was also said that 4 teams will be promoted from the second division to increase the number of teams to 16, implying that there will be no relegation but promotion in this new system.

== Teams ==
Team	Home city	Home ground
Rivers Angels	Rivers State	Liberation Stadium
Pelican Stars	Calabar	U. J. Esuene Stadium
Osun Babes	Osun State	Ede Federal Polytechnic Stadium
Ibom Angels	Akwa-Ibom State	Akwa-Ibom Stadium
Confluence Queens	Kogi State	Lokoja Confluence Stadium
Nasarawa Amazons	Nasarawa State	Lafia Township Stadium
Delta Queens	Delta State	Asaba Township Stadium
FC Edo Queens	Edo State	
Adamawa Queens	Adamawa State	
Taraba Queens	Taraba State	Jolly Nyame Stadium
Sunshine Queens	Ondo State	Akure Township Stadium
Bayelsa Queens	Bayelsa State	Krisdera Stadium

== Adamawa Queens Waiver request ==
After playing 10 games (in week 14), Adamawa Queens requested a waiver because other teams are refusing to visit their home-ground because of fear of Boko Haram. The board accepted the waiver and tagged all her matches null and void thereby updating the table. Adamawa Queens will return next season when the insurgency and state of emergency has relapsed.

== League table ==
Pos	Team	Pld	W	D	L	GF	GA	GD	Pts	Qualification or relegation
1	Rivers Angels	20	12	3	5	32	17	+15	39	Champions
2	Pelican Stars	20	11	3	6	25	19	+6	36	
3	Sunshine Queens	20	11	0	9	25	20	+5	33	
4	Osun Babes	20	10	2	8	22	24	−2	32	
5	Confluence Queens	20	10	1	9	29	25	+4	31	
6	Nasarawa Amazons	20	9	3	8	21	19	+2	30	
7	Ibom Angels	20	8	3	9	25	25	0	27	
8	Taraba Queens	20	6	6	8	17	26	−9	24	
9	Delta Queens	20	5	6	9	21	20	+1	21	
10	Bayelsa Queens	20	5	5	10	15	25	−10	20	
11	Edo Queens	20	6	2	12	18	30	−12	20	
12	Adamawa Queens (Note: Adamawa Queens requested a waiver after playing 10 games, saying teams refused to visit their city because of Boko Haram and were not ready to relocate to Taraba State at the request of the board.)	0	0	0	0	0	0	0	0	

Rules for classification: 1) points; 2) goal difference; 3) number of goals scored.

== Statistics ==
Top scorer
Amarachi Orjinma (Pelican Stars)
Total goals scored
252 goals (193 home team and 59 for away team)
Most clean sheets
Pelican Stars (9 games)
Highest number of away wins
Rivers Angels and Pelican Stars (2)
Most prolific team at home – Confluence Queens (25 goals)
Most prolific team away – Rivers Angels (10 goals)
Worst defence - Edo Queens ( 31 goals conceded)
Highest scoring side- Rivers Angels (32 goals)
Number of away wins
8
