= Nigeria Pitch Awards =

- Awarded for: Rewarding sports excellence
- Sponsored by: Matchmakers Consult International Limited; Nigeria Football Federation
- Country: Nigeria
- Reward: Plaque
- First award: 2013
- Website: nigeriapitchawards.com

The Nigeria Pitch Awards are awards presented to Nigerian former and present sports people, administrators and journalists in recognition of their positive contributions to sports in Nigeria. Initiated by Matchmakers Consult International Limited and approved by the Nigeria Football Federation, the first Nigeria Pitch Awards ceremony was held on November 16, 2013 in Calabar, Cross River State, Nigeria.

== Ceremonies ==
- 2013 – 1st Nigeria Pitch Awards
- 2015 – 2nd Nigeria Pitch Awards
- 2016 – 3rd Nigeria Pitch Awards
- 2017 – 4th Nigeria Pitch Awards
- 2018 – 5th Nigeria Pitch Awards
- 2019 -- 6th Nigeria Pitch Awards

== Categories ==
The award was initiated with 16 categories until March 10, 2016 when 6 categories were added. The following are the current categories:

=== Players category ===
- Goalkeeper of the Year
- Defender of the Year
- Midfielder of the Year
- Striker of the Year
- Rashidi Yekini Award
- Sam Okwaraji Award
- MVP (Men) in the NPFL Award
- MVP (Women) in the NPFL Award
- Queen of the Pitch
- King of the Pitch

=== Club category ===
- Club of the Year
- Manager of the Year
- Coach of the Year
- Most Valuable Player (Women) in the Nigeria Professional Football League
- Most Valuable Player (Men) in the Nigeria Professional Football League

=== Official's category ===
- Referee of the Year
- Players' Agent of the Year

=== State category ===
- State with the Best Grassroots Football Development Programme
- Football Friendly Governor of the Year

=== Media category ===
- Football Journalist of the Year (Print)
- Football Journalist of the Year (TV)
- Football Journalist of the Year (Radio)

=== Corporate category ===
- Corporate Sponsor of Football Award
- Honorary
- Special Achievement Award
- Football Achievement Award

== Past editions ==
=== 1st Nigeria Pitch Awards ===
The first edition of the Nigeria Pitch Awards was held on November 16, 2013 at the Transcorp Metropolitan Hotel in Calabar, Cross River State with notable sports and government personalities in attendance.

==== Winners ====
- Goalkeeper of the Year – Vincent Enyeama
- Defender of the Year – Godfrey Oboabona
- Midfielder of the Year – Mikel John Obi
- Striker of the Year – Emmanuel Emenike
- Coach of the Year – Stephen Keshi
- Manager of the Year – Felix Anyansi-Agwu
- Club of the Year – Kano Pillars F.C.
- Referee of the Year – Jelili Ogunmuyiwa
- Players' Agent of the Year – John Olatunji Shittu
- State with the Best Grassroots Football Development Programme – Lagos State
- Football Journalist of the Year (Print) – Ade Ojeikere
- Football Journalist of the Year (Radio) – Bimbo Adeola
- Football Journalist of the Year (TV) – Toyin Ibitoye
- Football Achievement Awards – Aminu Maigari, Musa Amadu and Chris Green
- Special Recognition Awards – Jay-Jay Okocha, Rafiu Ladipo, Gideon Akinsola and Paul Bassey

=== 2nd Nigeria Pitch Awards ===
The 2nd Nigeria Pitch Awards ceremony was held on June 13, 2015 in Abuja following a change in the schedule which was originally slated to hold on May 6, 2015 in Lagos. The ceremony saw Vincent Enyeama, Toyin Ibitoye, Bimbo Adeola and Felix Anyansi-Agwu retain Goalkeeper of the Year, Football Journalist of the Year (TV), Football Journalist of the Year (Radio) and Manager of the Year awards.

==== Winners ====
- Goalkeeper of the Year – Vincent Enyeama
- Defender of the Year – Kenneth Omeruo
- Midfielder of the Year – Ogenyi Onazi
- Striker of the Year – Ahmed Musa
- Referee of the Year – Ferdinand Udoh
- Club of the Year – Kano Pillars F.C.
- Coach of the Year – Okey Emordi
- Manager of the Year – Felix Anyansi-Agwu
- Football Friendly Governor of the Year – Liyel Imoke
- State with the Best Graasroots Football Development Programme – Lagos State
- Football Journalist of the Year (Print) – Tana Aiyejina
- Football Journalist of the Year (Radio) – Bimbo Adeola
- Football Journalist of the Year (TV) – Toyin Ibitoye
- Queen of the Pitch – Asisat Oshoala
- King of the Pitch – Vincent Enyeama

=== 3rd Nigeria Pitch Awards ===
The 3rd Nigeria Pitch Awards ceremony was held on March 25, 2016, in at Hotel Seventeen in Kaduna. At the ceremony, Assisat Oshoala and Tana Aiyejina retained their awards as Queen of the Pitch and Football Journalist of the Year. The ceremony was witnessed by The Governor of Kaduna State, Mallam Nasir El-Rufai, Honourable Minister of Youth and Sports Development, Barr. Solomon Dalong, the NFF President, Amaju Pinnick, NFF 2nd Vice President, Shehu Dikko and other board members. Also present were Sir Mike Okiro, Chairman, Police Service Commission, Pastor Ituah Ighodalo, Managing Partner, SIAO Partners, Kunle Soname, Chairman, Bet9ja, Super Eagles Interim Coach, Samson Siasia, Super Eagles Captain, Mikel John Obi and all members of the Super Eagles and coaching crew.

==== Winners ====
- Ikechukwu Ezenwa - Goal Keeper of the Year
- Chinedu Udoji - Defender of the Year
- Paul Onobi - Midfielder of the Year
- Odion Ighalo - Striker of the Year
- Gbolahan Salami - Rasheedi Yekini Award
- Gbolahan Salami - MVP (Men) in the NPFL
- Ngozi Ebere - MVP (Women) in the Nigeria women Premier League
- Enyimba FC - Club of the Year
- U-17 Golden Eaglet - Team of the Year
- Emmanuel Amuneke - Coach of the Year
- Kadiri Ikhana - Manager of the Year
- Ferdinand Udoh _ Referee of the Year
- John Olatunji Shittu - Player’s Agent of the Year
- Lagos State _ State with the Best Grassroots Football Development Programme
- H.E Nyesom Wike - Football Friendly Governor of the Year
- Tana Aiyejina _ Football Journalist of the Year – Print
- Godwin Enakhena - Football Journalist of the Year –Radio
- Austin Okon-Akpan _ Football Journalist of the Year –TV
- Globacom _ Gold-Corporate Sponsor of Football
- Guinness - Silver- Corporate Sponsor of Football
- Supersport - Bronze- Corporate Sponsor of Football
- Segun Odegbami _ Sam Okwaraji Awards
- Amaju Pinnick - Sam Okwaraji Awards
- Mikel John Obi _ Sam Okwaraji Awards
- Asisat Oshoala - Queen of the Pitch
- Odion Ighalo - King of the Pitch
- HE Nasir El-Rufai - Special Achievement Award
- Barr. Solomon Dalong - Special Achievement Award
- Sir Mike Mbama Okiro - Special Achievement Award
- Dr Mohammed Sanusi - Special Achievement Award
- Samson Siasia - Football Achievement Award
- Michael Ede - Player’s Agent of the Year 2019
