= Confluence Stadium =

Stadium in Lokoja, Kogi State, Nigeria

Coordinates: 07°48′48″N 06°41′54″E

Confluence Stadium is a multi-purpose stadium in Lokoja, Kogi State with a 25,000 seating capacity. It is the home ground of Kogi United and Confluence Queens in the Nigeria National League and Nigeria Women Premier League respectively. It was used as a temporary venue for the home games of Niger Tornadoes during the 2016 Nigeria Professional Football League. The Tornadoes permanent home stadium, however, remains Bako Kontagora Stadium.

== History ==
The stadium was built in 1998 and upgraded to improve its standard in 2008.

== Use ==
Confluence Stadium is mostly used for football matches and occasionally for state and national ceremonial events, such as religious, political and social events.
