= Labour relations in women's association football =

Overview of labour relationships in women's football

Professional women's association football players have organized to dispute several issues specific to the sport, such as disparities in compensation compared to men's teams; insufficient pay to compete with other women's teams; unfair or exclusionary financial terms of federation business agreements involving the team; a lack of minimum standards in facilities and treatment, especially compared to men's teams in the same federation, league, or club; reports of systemic gender-related abuse of players, including sexual abuse being ignored by league or federation officials; and a lack of benefits specific to women such as paid leave for pregnancy and maternity, and child care coverage.

Disputes have been waged between national team players and football associations, between club players and their teams and leagues, between players and managers, between referees of women's football and their governing organizations, and between players and federations or laws that prevented women from playing or professionalizing the sport.

Women's footballers have also organized their labour in support of causes outside of the sport and aligned themselves with labour unions unrelated to sport, sometimes in pursuit of broader societal goals around resolving gender pay gaps and addressing labour needs specific to women.

== Themes of disputes ==
=== Inadequate compensation ===
Players, coaches, and referees for women's national teams and club leagues have raised complaints about being paid insufficiently, or at all, to cover the expenses of their national team or club play, despite the attention and revenue generated by their efforts. Women's players have also organized in the face of legal or federation-level obstacles to professionalizing women's football in nations where men's football was already professionalized. In 2023, global player union FIFPro reported that in a survey of 362 players from 69 member players' unions across all FIFA-member confederations, 29 percent of players participating in 2023 FIFA Women's World Cup qualification or the 2022 UEFA Women's European Championship were not paid — neither wages nor to cover expenses — for playing in those international competitions, and 66 percent of players reported taking either unpaid or paid leave from another job in order to compete.

=== Gender pay gaps ===
Separate disputes also arise over perceived unfairness in compensation between men's and women's teams that participate under the same federation or at similar tournaments. These disputes — particularly the United States women's national team's equal pay dispute from 2016 to 2022 — have been viewed by commentators as microcosms of broader gender pay gap debates in sport and society, while other commentators suggest that such movements are mired in inaccurate perceptions, or are limited by differences in revenue generation between men's and women's teams or prize money awarded by FIFA.

=== Player agency ===
Clubs have attempted to restrict player movement using league rules, such as the United States National Women's Soccer League, or the Argentinian case of Macarena Sánchez being prevented from signing with another team after UAI Urquiza released her. National team managers have implemented heavily controlling policies that players have claimed restricted their freedom or invaded their privacy, and denied call-ups to protesting players as punishment.

=== Player safety ===
Players have also organized to advocate for their own safety. Players have sought adequate equipment and facilities for training and playing professionally and sufficient medical treatment standards for treatment and recovery. Women's players have faced verbal, physical, and sexual abuse from coaches, officials, managers, and federation leaders while simultaneously lacking the means to report or investigate reports of abuse or hold offenders accountable within the sport.

The 2023 FIFPro survey also reported that 54 percent of players did not receive any pre-competition physical exam before participating in World Cup qualifiers or the 2022 European Championship, and 30 percent did not receive an electrocardiogram. Only 30 percent reported having physical training facilities that met professional standards, 26 percent reported having no access to physical training facilities, and 20 percent additionally had no access to recovery facilities.

=== Gender-specific benefits ===
Women's players have organized or sued to win support for paid leave for pregnancy and maternity, child care, and accommodations in football kits for menstruating players.

In January 2021, FIFA enacted regulations entitling players to at least 14 weeks of paid maternity leave and a right for players to be reintegrated into clubs after pregnancy with ongoing medical support.

== Relations with other unions ==
Some women's sports labour unions expanded their influence by affiliating with broader labour movements. The National Women's Soccer League Players Association of the United States' top-division National Women's Soccer League (NWSL) was a founding member of the AFL-CIO Sports Council, alongside the NFL Players Association and two other men's sports unions, and later joined by the Major League Baseball Players Association and men's Major League Soccer Players Association. NWSL players joined picketers at the 2021 Nabisco strike in Portland, Oregon.

=== Advocacy within mixed-gender unions ===
In global players' association FIFPro and nations where men's and women's players share unions, organizations such as Australia's Professional Footballers' Association formed specialized committees and initiatives to address needs specific to women's players, and women's players ran for and were elected to union roles, such as English defender Casey Stoney's 2013 election as the first woman to the Professional Footballers' Association's management committee. The Norwegian Players' Association helped negotiate Norway's equal pay agreement between men's and women's teams.

== In Argentina ==
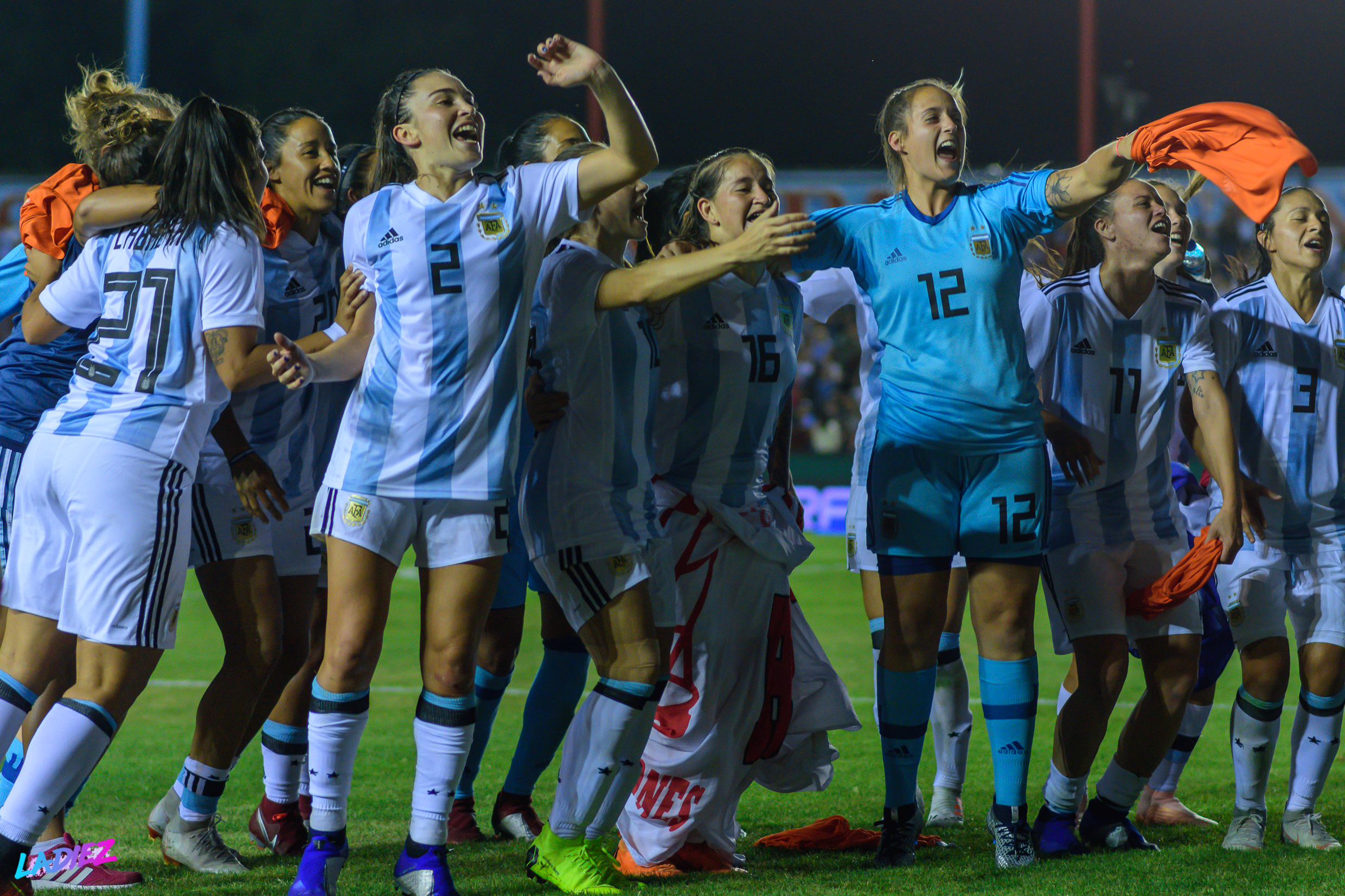
Before defeating Panama in November 2018 to earn a berth to the 2019 FIFA Women's World Cup, Argentina's women's team went on strike over pay and travel arrangements during qualifiers.

=== National team ===
Following the Argentina women's national football team's failure to qualify for the 2015 FIFA Women's World Cup, the Argentine Football Association (AFA) cut all funding for the team, effectively disbanding the team and leading to FIFA classifying it as inactive in 2016. The team was reinstated in summer 2017 for a friendly against Uruguay to prepare for the 2018 Copa América Femenina. However, after being required to travel in and out of Uruguay on the same day as the match and being paid only 150 pesos (US$8.50) for the match, the players launched a strike. In an open letter to AFA women's committee president Ricardo Pinela, the players claimed that stipends that the players were owed had not been paid, and demanded fundamental improvements to their training facilities, such as locker rooms. The team protested during the 2018 Copa América Femenina by raising their hands to their ears during team photos, to suggest that they wanted the AFA to hear their requests.

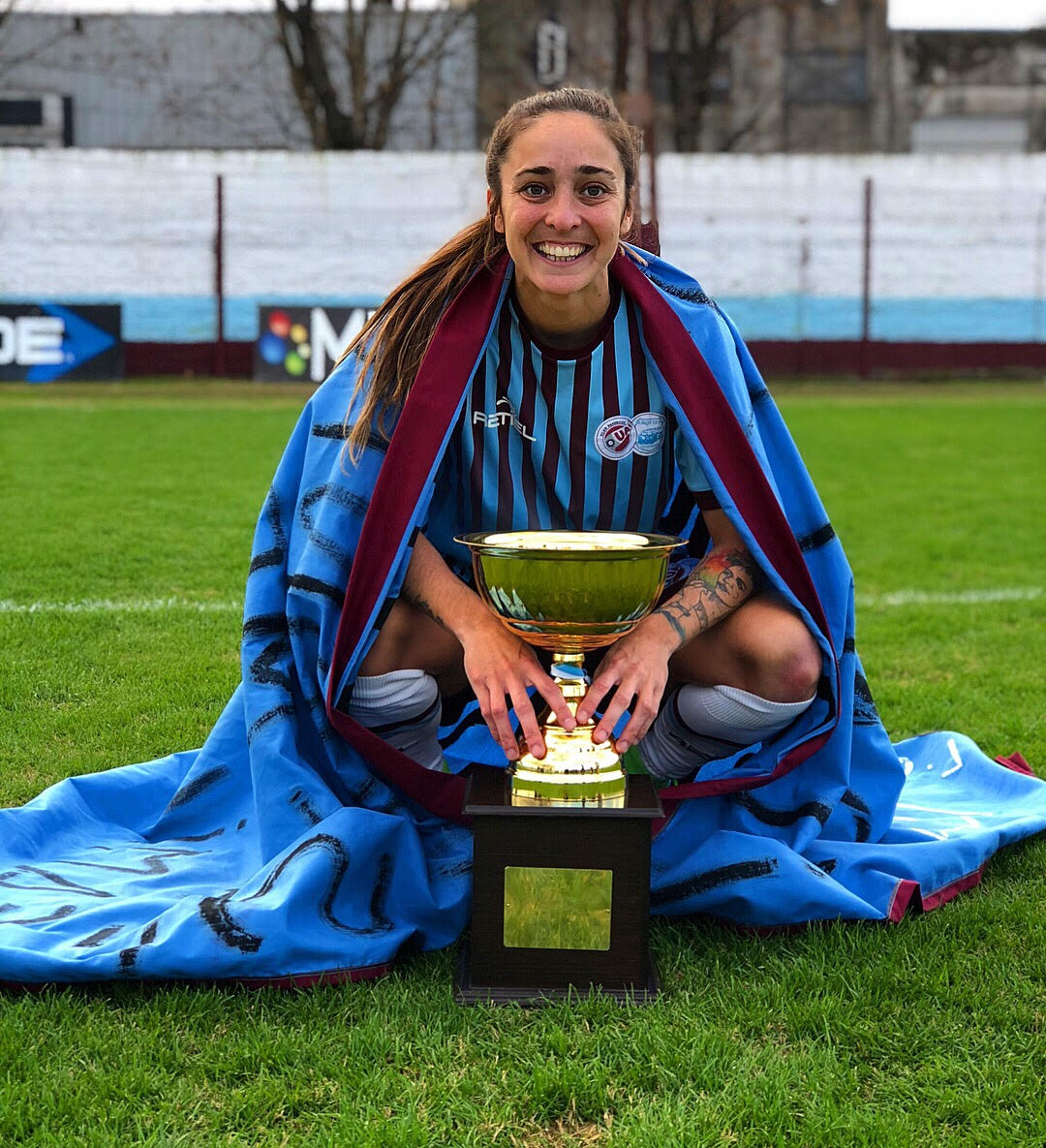
Macarena Sánchez's lawsuit led to the start of professionalization for Argentina's Primera División A.

=== League ===
Player-activist Macarena Sánchez led efforts to professionalize the nation's club league Primera División A, but was released by her team UAI Urquiza in January 2019 under terms that prevented her from signing with a new team. She in turn sued UAI Urquiza and the AFA, alleging discrimination where professional women's players were wrongly treated as amateurs, and her plight attracted the support of feminist movements such as Ni una menos, the international footballers' labour organization FIFPRO, and Argentinian players from the 1950s to 1990s. The AFA announced in March that it had agreed with the footballers' union Futbolistas Argentinos Agremiados to support professionalizing the women's league. Three months after her lawsuit, Sánchez was one of fifteen players who joined San Lorenzo on a professional contract, a historic first for Argentine women's football.

== In Australia ==
=== National team ===
==== 2015 CBA dispute ====
In September 2015, the Australian senior national team held a two-month strike following the breakdown of negotiations over a new collective bargaining agreement (CBA). The players, along with the Professional Footballers Australia (PFA) trade union, issued a statement saying that Football Federation Australia (FFA) "failed to recognise the significant sacrifices the Matildas players are forced to make in playing for their country" and called for a number of improvements in pay and working conditions. An agreement was reached in November 2015, including a significant raise in pay.

A new CBA agreed upon in 2019 between the PFA and FFA reduced the gap in revenue distribution between men's and women's teams; equalized both teams' travel accommodations, training facilities, and performance support staff; increased the share of FIFA prize money distributed to the women's team; and restructured or improved benefits around player pregnancy and post-pregnancy reintegration to the national team. Parental benefits included 12 months of paid leave and travel benefits for primary caretakers of an infant, one paid leave for the duration of a national team window allowed to secondary caretakers of a child, and a guaranteed option to return to national team play following medical clearance. The accommodations were expected to reduce the instances of elite players, such as Heather Garriock, retiring from international play after giving birth.

=== Leagues ===
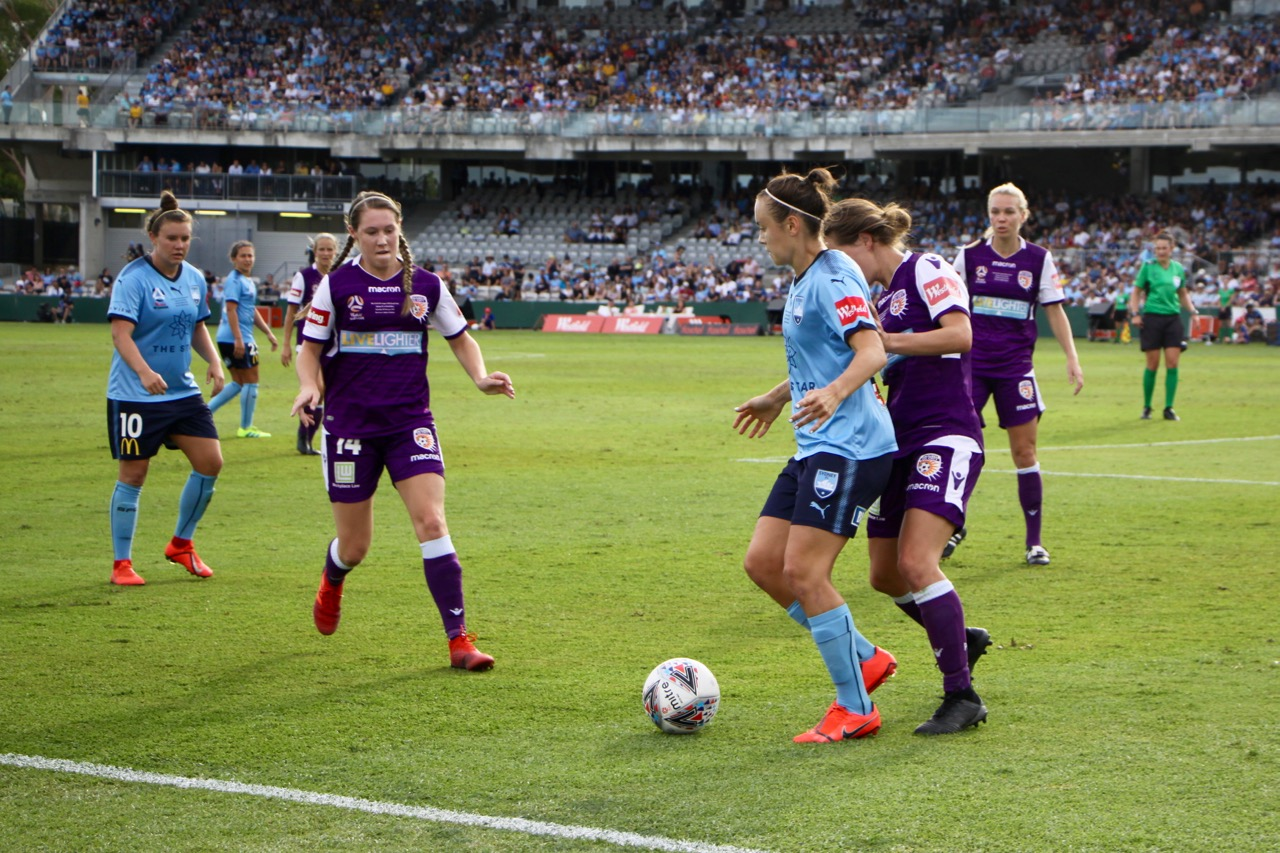
The Australian A-League Women faced several disputes with players over pay, conditions, and benefits.

In 2016, Professional Footballers Australia (PFA) raised concerns that the lack of minimum medical standards in the W-League caused players to experience a disproportionate number of injuries. The union requested dedicated sports physicians for each W-League club, physiotherapists at every training and match, preseason medical tests, and the right for injured players to seek a second opinion and choose their surgeon if a procedure is required.

The union push expanded to set minimum salaries, improve the league's marketing, and establish a full home-and-away structure to extend the season. In 2017, Football Federation Australia, the W-League's clubs, and PFA signed a new collective bargaining agreement (CBA) that raised minimum wages and professionalized more of the league by increasing roster sizes, salary caps, and medical standards. It also introduced the league's first maternity policies. In a 2019 extension to the existing CBA, W-League players saw their hourly pay rate equalized with men's A-League players, though they would still be paid less due to the W-League's season being 14 rounds to the men's 27. In 2021, the push culminated in a new CBA signed in 2021 that also equalized medical standards and set minimum workplace standards across the men's and women's A-Leagues, and increased minimum salary spending in the women's league to $17,055 per player. It also led to the establishment of a longer 18-round home-and-away schedule in the women's league in 2022.

After a January 2023 A-League Women match between Canberra United and Western United was allowed to proceed with temperatures above 35 degrees Celsius, five players from the match required medical treatment for heat-related conditions. Women's matches were pushed into hotter parts of the early afternoon in order to accommodate scheduling A-League Men's matches, which take broadcast priority. Player complaints led to revisions to the league's heat policies in February 2023.

== In Brazil ==
=== National team ===
==== 2017 protest ====
In 2017, the Brazilian Football Confederation fired head coach Emily Lima, which sparked protest among the team's players. The dispute evolved into an argument for greater wages, and more respect and recognition for the country's female football players. Players such as Cristiane, Rosana, and Francielle announced their retirement from international football in protest.

== In Canada ==
=== National team ===
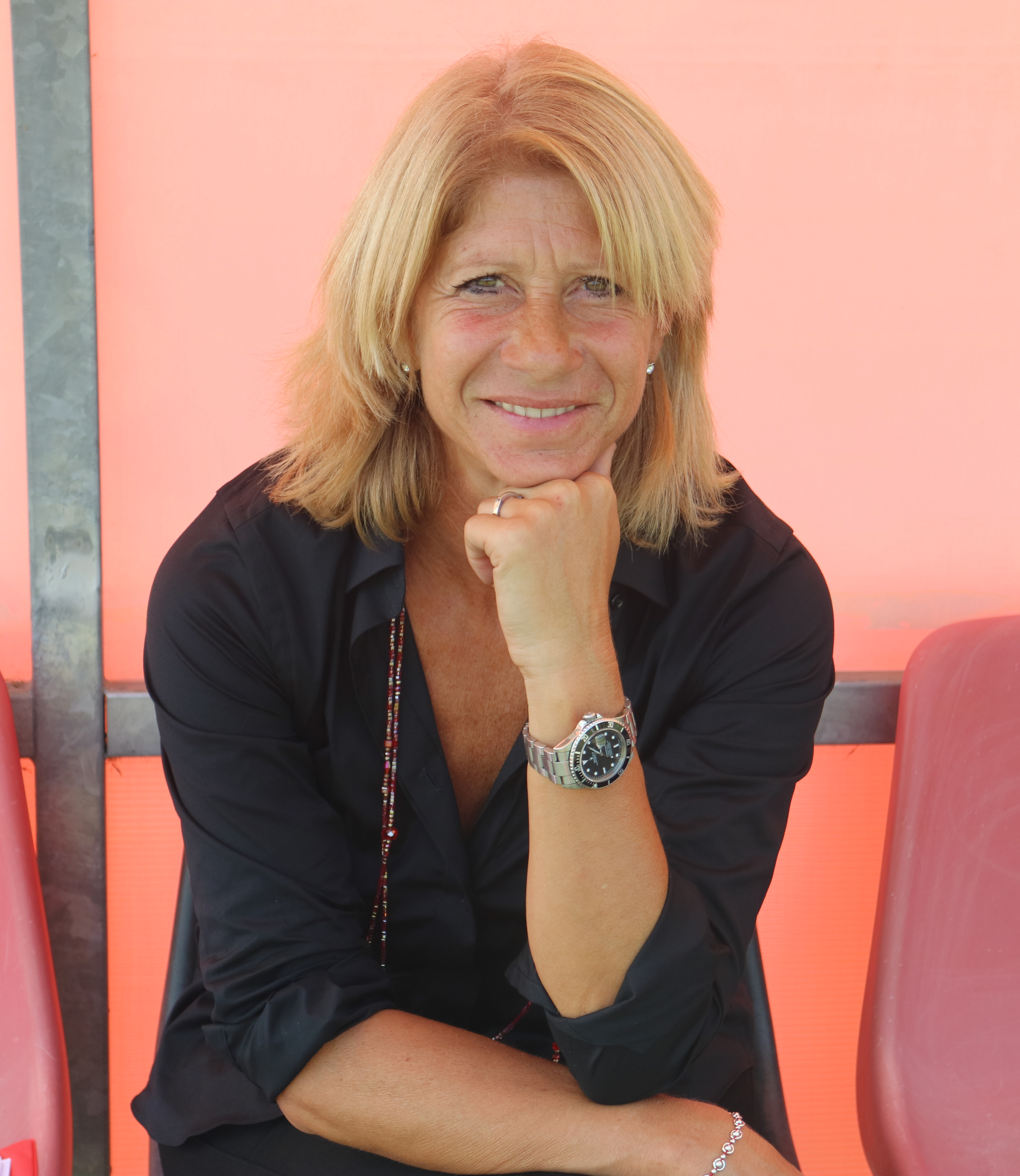
Canadian manager Carolina Morace threatened to quit before the 2011 FIFA Women's World Cup over compensation complaints, alongside similar player advocacy for equitable pay structures between men's and women's teams.

==== 2011 pay dispute ====
In 2011, Canadian players and the team's manager Carolina Morace raised complaints with Canada Soccer over compensation ahead of the 2011 FIFA Women's World Cup. Players sought parity with the Canadian men's national team in the calculations used to determine players' salaries, though not equal pay, and proposed raising the issue for arbitration with the Sport Dispute Resolution Centre of Canada. Players stepped away from club play to focus entirely on World Cup preparation, and national team defender Carmelina Moscato noted that players would often negotiate pay with Canada Soccer during competitive tournaments. Morace threatened to resign after the 2011 World Cup over her own dispute with the association.

Morace reached a short-term settlement through the 2012 Summer Olympics, and a day later Canada Soccer resolved its dispute with the team's players. Morace, however, resigned after Canada failed to advance past the World Cup's group stage.

==== 2023 pay dispute ====
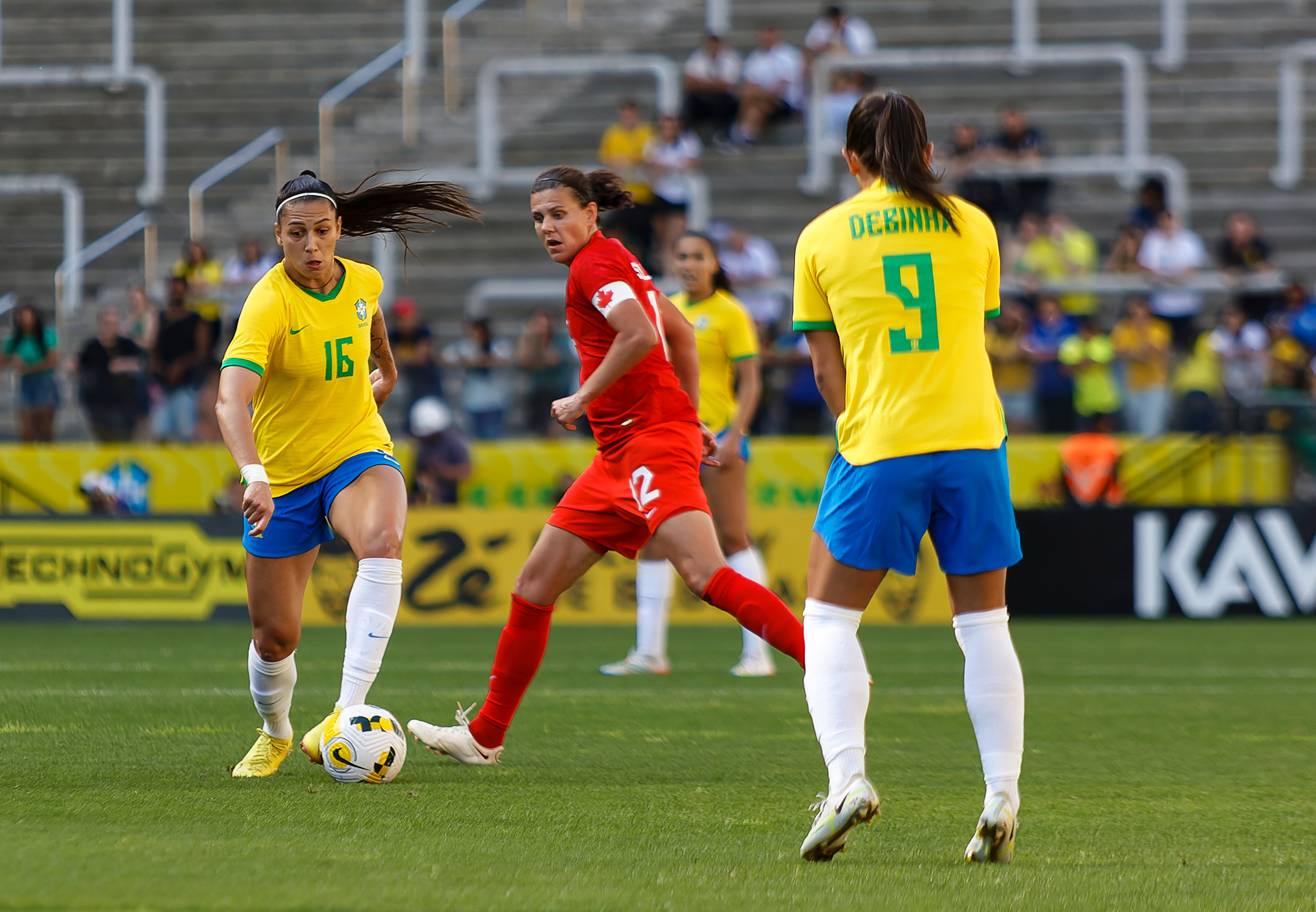
Canada captain Christine Sinclair, center, claimed her federation's president personally disrespected her during parliamentary hearings over the team's budget dispute.

Following Canada's first Olympic gold medal victory at the 2020 Summer Olympics in Tokyo, the team's funding agreement with Canada Soccer expired. In February 2023, six months prior to the 2023 FIFA Women's World Cup, the team announced that it would go on strike to protest cuts to the program's budget, including its youth teams. In a nationally televised interview, Canada captain Christine Sinclair said she could not represent the federation until the conflict was resolved. The women's team's strike was supported by the men's team, who claimed Canada Soccer obstructed requests for financial records to confirm the organization's claim that the cuts were necessary. Players from other national teams wore purple armbands representing gender equality in solidarity with Canada, including England, Ireland, Japan, and the United States, who wore their armbands in a friendly played against Canada in which Canadian players wore purple pre-match shirts reading "Enough is Enough" in hand-written lettering and had taped over their national team crests on their pre-match gear. Global footballers' union FIFPro included its members in the campaign.

The Canadian men's team's contract had also expired, and had also gone on strike in June 2022 over funding. The women's team sat out of training on February 11, but returned within a week, claiming that Canada Soccer had threatened legal action against the team and individual players because it had not gotten permission to legally strike from the Canada Industrial Relations Board. Players responded by claiming their federation was poorly governed and underfunding the women's team compared to the men's program, and Sinclair posted to Twitter that the team was playing the 2023 SheBelieves Cup under protest. Both teams also criticized Canada Soccer's agreements with a private entity, men's Canadian Premier League-affiliated Canada Soccer Business, giving it control over and a cut of revenue from corporate partnerships and non-FIFA broadcast rights for both men's and women's teams for 10 years.

By 27 February, Canada Soccer president Nick Bontis resigned after provincial and territorial soccer administrators, and the men's and women's national teams, requested either his resignation or removal by Canada minister of sport Pascale St-Onge. The teams reached an interim pay agreement that equalized compensation and incentives between the men's and women's teams a week later on 5 March but by 9 March were again at odds with Canada Soccer after the federation publicly shared private details about a proposed collective bargaining agreement without notifying the players. The dispute also resulted in an investigation by the Canadian House of Commons Standing Committee on Canadian Heritage, which began hours after the federation leaked the proposed CBA, and during which Sinclair alleged that Bontis referred to the women's team's compensation proposal by asking, "What was it Christine was bitching about?" Bontis, whose testimony was delayed by the death of an alleged stalker, apologized while claiming he did not remember the language he used. The hearings also included Bontis's predecessor Victor Montagliani, who was questioned about his handling of former Vancouver Whitecaps Women coach Bob Birarda, who was accused and convicted of sexual harassment of underaged players during his tenure.

== In Chile ==
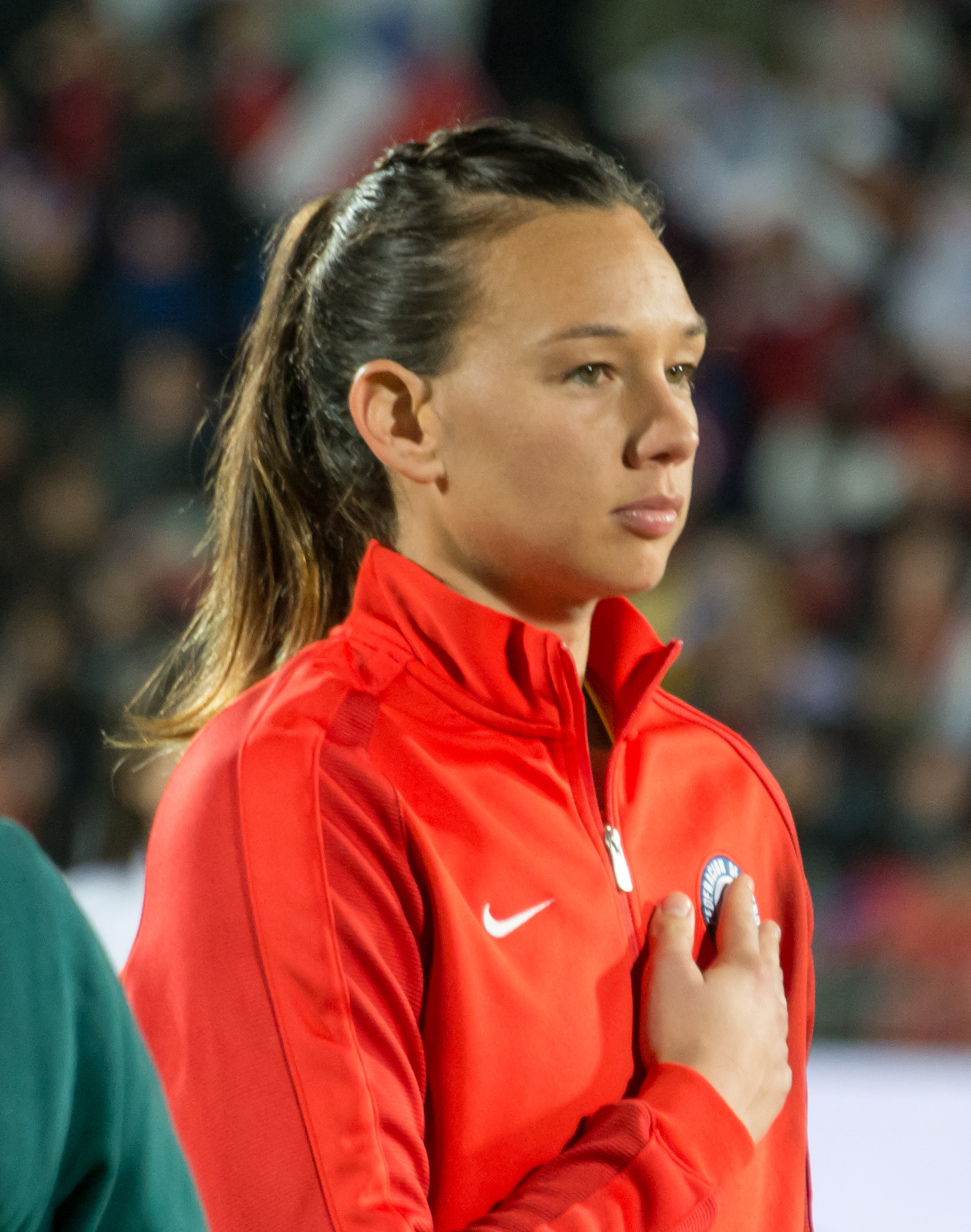
Chile national team goalkeeper Christiane Endler helped organize the nation's players' union.

=== National team ===
In 2014, Chilean national team player Iona Rothfeld participated in the 2014 South American Games with the senior women's national team. The games also featured Chile's under-17 boys' team. Rothfeld witnessed the disparity in treatment between the boys' team, who were allowed to use the senior men's nation team facilities, and the women's team, who were made to rest in classrooms. After a regime change in the national Asociación Nacional de Fútbol Profesional replaced Sergio Jadue, who was implicated in the 2015 FIFA corruption case, with Arturo Salah, ANJUFF worked with the new leadership to improve conditions for the team during preparation for the 2019 FIFA Women's World Cup, which Chile qualified for.

In 2016, players frustrated with the national team's inactive status with FIFA organized the National Association of Female Footballers (ANJUFF). The organization effort was led by players, including Rothfeld, Christiane Endler, and Camila García. ANJUFF was recognized by Chile's athletic unions and FIFPro, and was one of the first efforts to unionize female athletes in Latin America.

The Chilean team made its competitive return in May 2017, defeating Peru 12–0. In 2018, thanks to the efforts of ANJUFF, Chile hosted the 2018 Copa América Femenina, in which Chile finished second behind Brazil, qualifying them for the nation's first FIFA Women's World Cup and a chance to qualify for the 2020 Olympics in a CAF-CONMEBOL qualification playoff.

=== League ===
In 2021, ANJUFF worked with the University of Chile to survey club players on their pay and conditions. The survey found that only 50 of 520 respondents held any professional contract, and that most made less than 500,000 pesos (US$630) per month. Many players also reported being subject to harassment and discrimination.

On 21 March 2022, the Chamber of Deputies of Chile nearly unanimously approved legal reforms professionalizing women's football. The new law mandated at least half of each club's players must be under contract with at least a federal minimum wage, and that by 2025 every player must be contracted. Congress members credited the ANJUFF report with providing the data necessary to enact legislation.

== In Denmark ==
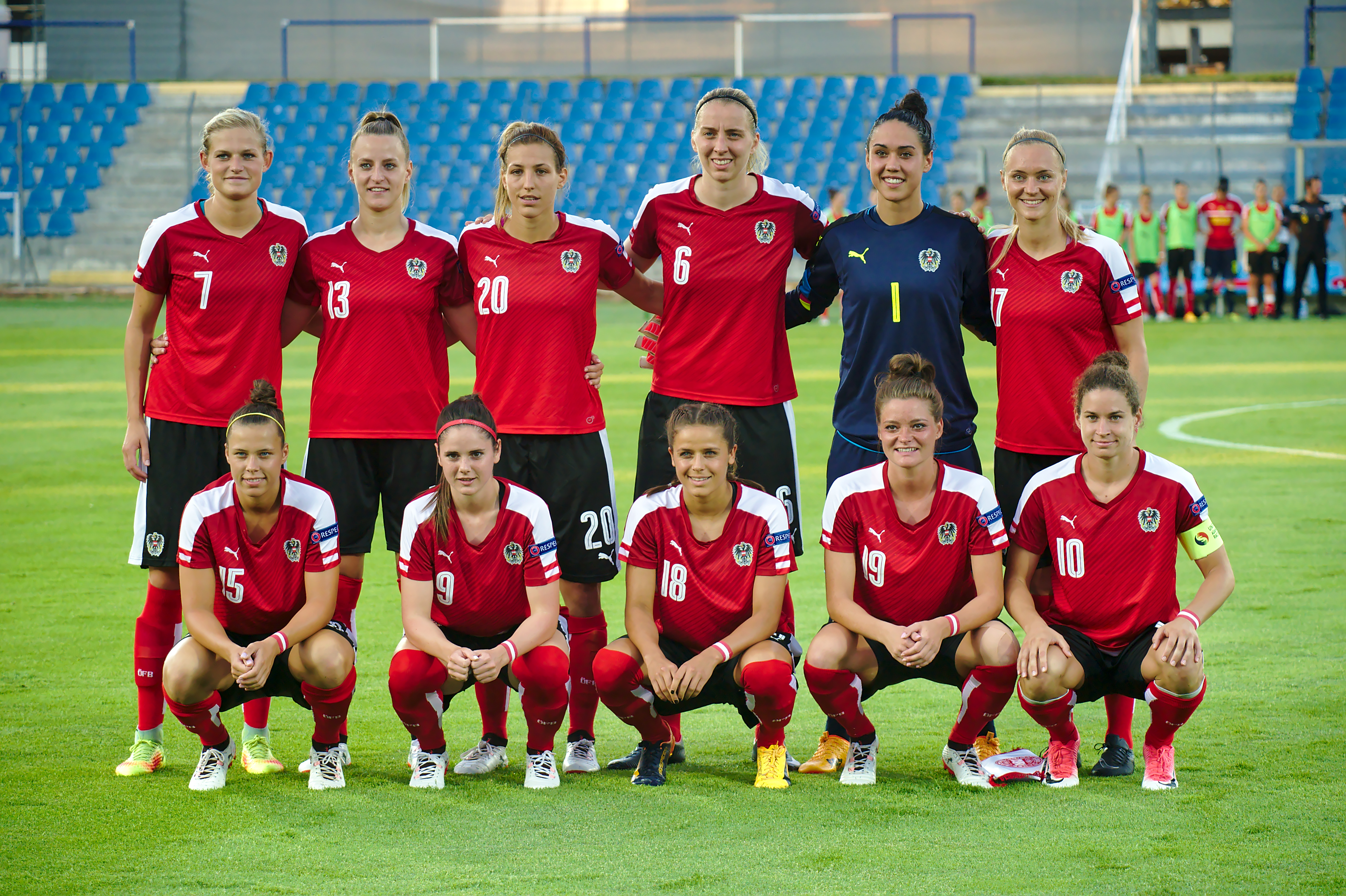
Denmark's national team went on a two-month strike over employment status in September 2017, including a forfeited World Cup qualification match.

In September 2017, the Danish senior national team held a two-month strike following the breakdown of negotiations over the team's collective bargaining agreement (CBA) with the Danish Football Association, particularly the association's plan to stop classifying women's national players as employees. The strike saw the national team forced to forfeit a World Cup qualifying match against Sweden, and UEFA threatened to suspend the team if the strike caused it to miss another match. A new CBA was signed in mid-November 2017.

== In England ==
=== 1921 coal miners' strike ===
Dick, Kerr Ladies F.C.'s charitable exploits inspired women's football teams to raise funds for locked-out English miners in 1921.

Matches of Dick, Kerr Ladies F.C., an early women's football club in Preston, Lancashire, England, were closely associated with charitable causes during World War I and the interwar period. As demand for coal dropped after the war, coal-mining communities in England faced disputes with increasingly privatized mining companies that led to miners organizing their labour. During a wage dispute between miners and mine owners, the owners locked miners out in Wigan and Leigh on 1 April 1921, and the charitable success of Dick, Kerr Ladies inspired the formation of women's football clubs that began playing matches in May 1921 to raise funds for distress relief. This included matches to fund soup kitchens for locked-out miners, leading to some of these matches being named "pea soup" matches. Fundraising games for distress funds continued after the end of the miners' dispute in June 1921.

=== 1921 Football Association (FA) ban ===
The Football Association's (FA) Football Association Council, composed of 60 men, banned women's football from FA facilities months later in December 1921, citing in part complaints about "the appropriation of the receipts to other than charitable objects" in its rationale. The ban was enacted in the midst of contemporary movements for women's suffrage in the United Kingdom, the growth of Marxist–Leninism in Britain, and complaints that women's football was a "degrading" activity for women. A Channel 4 documentary in 2017, When Football Banned Women, more directly suggested the "pea soup" matches contributed to the FA's ban by associating it with broader cultural concerns in England about women participating in political movements.

The ban lasted until at least 1969.

=== 2023 Women's World Cup disputes ===
On 3 July 2023, within days of the England women's national football team traveling to Australia and New Zealand for the 2023 FIFA Women's World Cup, the FA notified the team that players would not receive bonuses from the association for their performance in the tournament. The announcement ended negotiations between the players, who are not paid for match appearances at major tournaments, and the association. While the players would receive compensation directly from FIFA for their play for the first time, other federations — such as the United States Soccer Federation and Football Australia — agreed with their teams to pay their players additional bonuses. England's players do not have a collective bargaining agreement with their federation.

Players and clubs also raised disputes with the FA over the expected date of release for the tournament, and players disputed the FA's rules on media access that restricted players' ability to engage in sponsorship campaigns.

=== Women's Super League (WSL) ===
In April 2021, the players of Birmingham City W.F.C. issued a letter of complaints to the club's board over poor working conditions, saying that they were being prevented "from performing our jobs to the best of our ability." Among the issues raised by the players were a lack of overnight accommodation and medical staff for away games, the physio and rehabilitation room being located in a small portable building, issues with some key coaching staff not being full-time staff in contravention of WSL regulations, and fears over the club's commitment to staying in the WSL, as only three players were at that point under contract for the following season. The FA subsequently announced that it would launch an investigation.

== In France ==
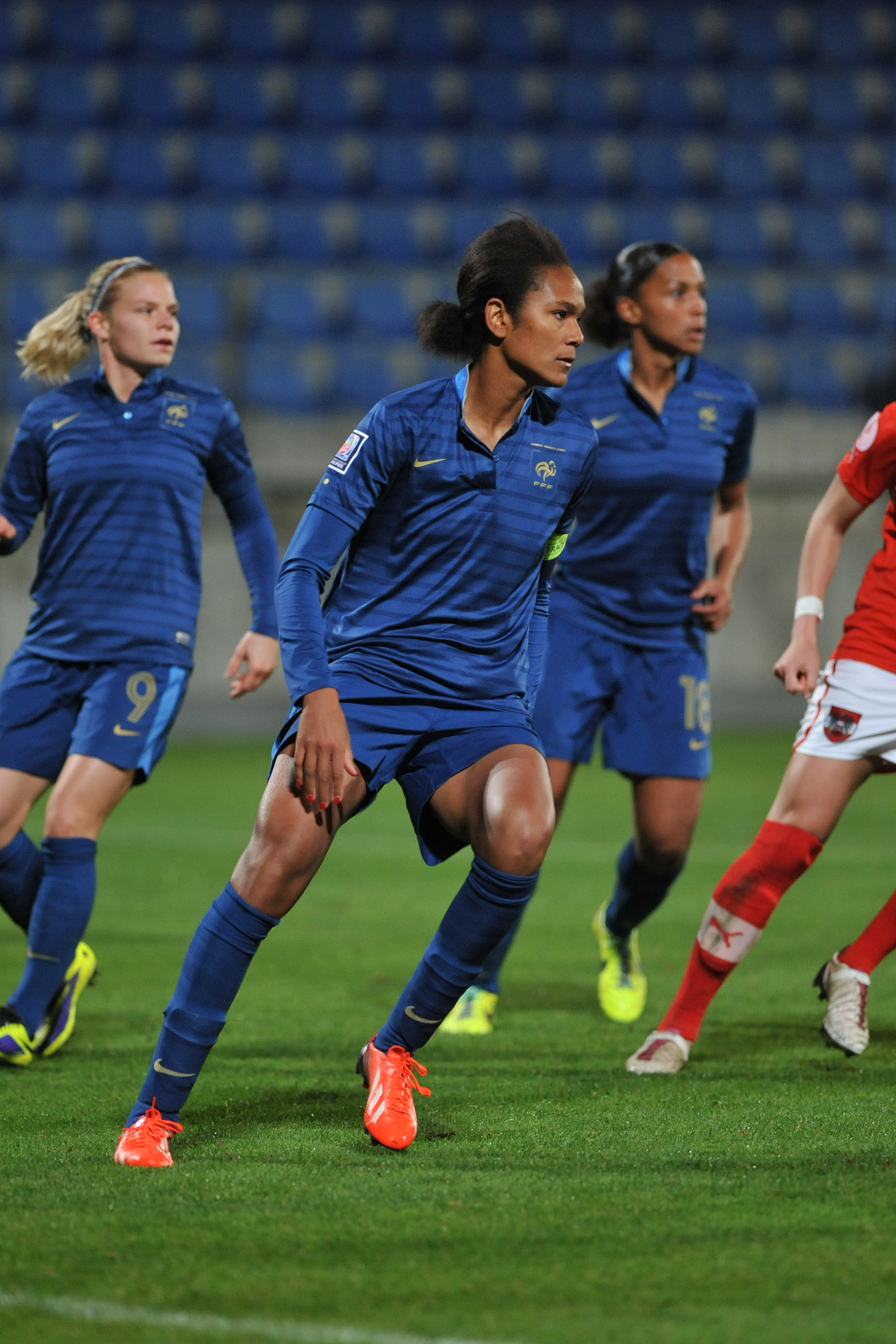
France national team defender Wendie Renard's resignation from international play in February 2023 was followed weeks later by the dismissal of controversial coach Corinne Diacre.

=== National team ===
==== 2023 player revolt ====
In February 2023, French defender and team captain Wendie Renard publicly withdrew herself from contention for France's national team in the 2023 FIFA Women's World Cup, citing risks to her mental health. Forwards Kadidiatou Diani and Marie-Antoinette Katoto immediately followed with public announcements that they were suspending their international careers. Katoto referenced events from 2019, when France national team manager Corinne Diacre refused to call Katoto up despite leading all goal scorers in the top-tier French club league Division 1 Féminine. All three players called for unspecified, but "necessary", changes. The Union Nationale des Footballeurs Professionnels (UNFP), France's players' union, praised the players' statements and requested that French Football Federation (FFF) enact changes.

Injured defender Griedge Mbock Bathy also publicly supported the resigning players, and the resignations followed previous disputes between Diacre and goalkeeper Sarah Bouhaddi, who retired from international duty on 29 July 2020 and by September stated that winning an international title with Diacre in charge "seems impossible to me"; and with former captain Amandine Henry and forward Eugénie Le Sommer, who Diacre had repeatedly omitted from French selections since 2020 despite their club form. Henry had alleged that her removal was in retaliation for speaking to FFF president Noël Le Graët about the team's problems in preparation for the 2019 FIFA Women's World Cup.

Diacre was supported by Le Graët through the players' claims, but he resigned on 28 February 2023 after allegations of sexual harassment that he denied. Diani, in a 5 March 2023 interview with Téléfoot, described national team camps that lacked coaching specialists on Diacre's direction and medical treatment that was inadequate compared to her club. On 8 March, Diacre published a statement declaring her intent to manage France at the 2023 World Cup; the next day, FFF dismissed Diacre and replaced her with former Saudi Arabia men's national team manager Herve Renard, who immediately began recruiting the omitted players back to the French roster. On 31 March, Herve Renard named Wendie Renard to the team's first roster since Diacre's dismissal, for friendlies in April against Colombia and Canada.

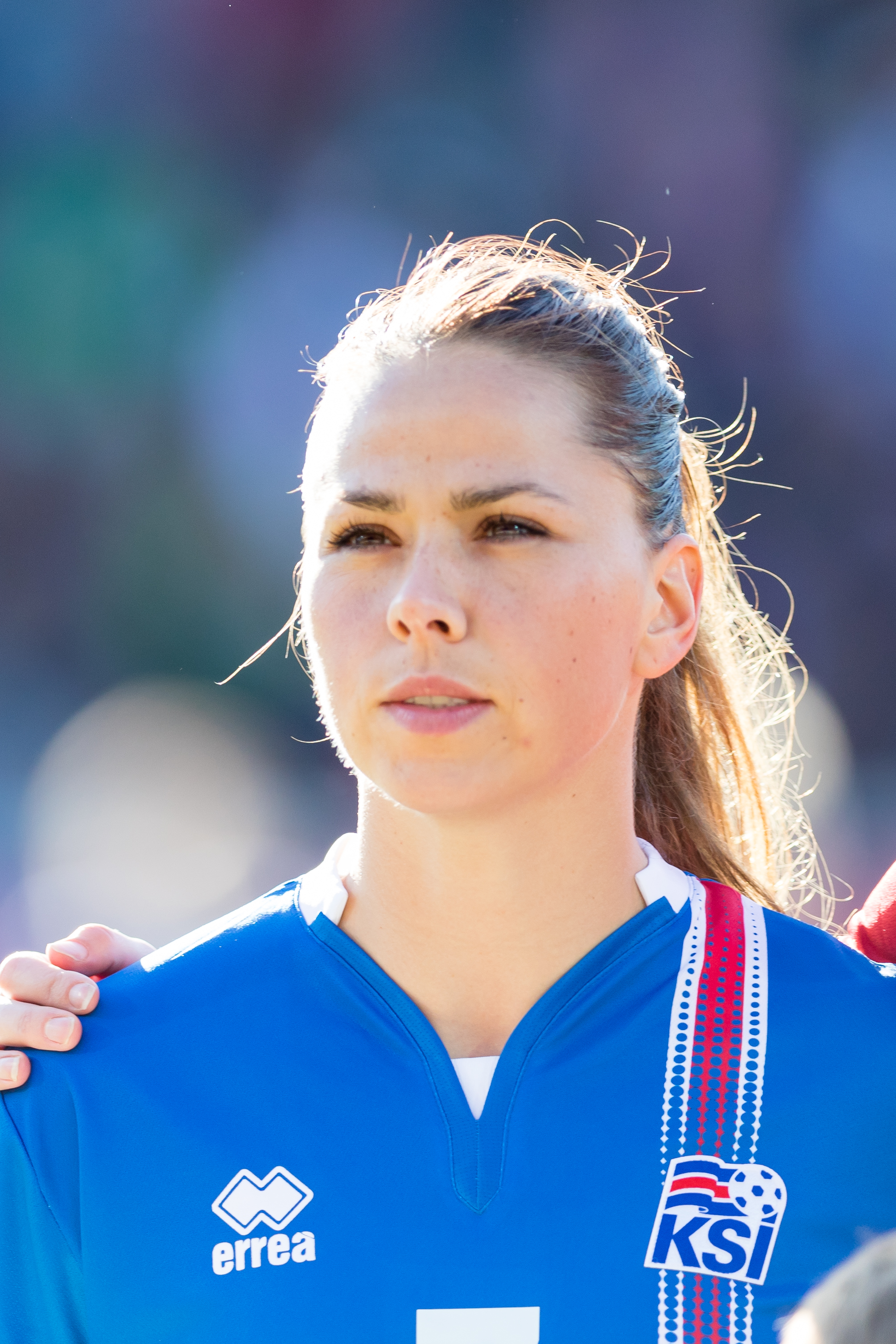
Sara Björk Gunnarsdóttir won pay owed to her by Olympique Lyonnais for pregnancy leave.

=== Division 1 Féminine (D1F) ===
==== 2023 maternity pay dispute ====
In 2021, Icelandic midfielder Sara Björk Gunnarsdóttir announced her pregnancy while playing for D1F club Olympique Lyon. By the terms of her employment agreement, Gunnarsdottir claimed that Lyon had failed to pay her wages due to her after she informed the club that she was pregnant. She raised the issue with the French players' union UNFP claiming that FIFA maternity regulations entitled Gunnarsdottir to her full salary. Lyon claimed that because Gunnarsdottir was not playing or working for the club, then she was not entitled to her salary.

On 19 May 2022, FIFA ruled against Olympique Lyon and awarded Gunnarsdóttir £72,139, plus an additional 5% annual interest. Gunnarsdóttir left Lyon and signed with Juventus in Italy, and publicized her story and its resolution in The Players' Tribune on 17 January 2023. The ruling was the first enforcement of FIFA's maternity leave regulations enacted in January 2021.

== In Ireland ==
In April 2017, the Republic of Ireland women's national football team announced potential strike action ahead of a match against Slovakia, with the support of the Professional Footballers' Association of Ireland and the SIPTU unions. The grievances raised by the players centered around a lack of pay and poor conditions, such as having to get changed into their uniforms in public toilets before games, having to share tracksuits with the junior women's teams, and being threatened by the Football Association of Ireland (FAI) not to discuss grievances publicly. The players further called for the introduction of match fees of €300 per match, as the players were often being forced to take unpaid leave from their day jobs to represent Ireland. After negotiations, an agreement was reached to avert the strike before the Slovakia match.

In August 2021, the FAI announced that an agreement had been reached with the men's and women's senior national teams to ensure equal pay between them. Negotiations had been led by women's captain Katie McCabe and men's captain Séamus Coleman. As part of the agreement, which entered into effect in September 2021, qualifying bonuses for major tournaments and match fees would be equal, with the men's side volunteering to lower their match fees in order to raise the match fees for the women's side.

== In Jamaica ==
After placing third at the 2018 CONCACAF Women's Championship, the Jamaican women's national team became the first Caribbean team to qualify for the FIFA Women's World Cup. However, the team went on strike in September 2019 alleging that they had not been paid by the Jamaican Football Federation in 9 months and weren't paid enough to cover expenses from playing in the World Cup.

Jamaica's manager Hue Menzies resigned after the tournament over his own pay dispute with the federation, and was replaced by Hubert Busby Jr., who was accused of sexual misconduct while coaching Vancouver Whitecaps Women in Canada. In 2021, twenty of the team's players demanded that Busby resign in a letter to the JFF.

On 15 June 2023, the team again raised protests against the JFF for its lack of financial support, planning, transportation, training facilities, nutrition, and facility access for the 2023 FIFA Women's World Cup, nor did the federation schedule any preparatory friendly matches during international windows. Players also reported not receiving their contractually agreed financial compensation. The mother of Reggae Girlz player Havana Solaun launched a fundraiser on GoFundMe to cover team expenses for the tournament, following a GoFundMe fundraiser organized for the team's attempted 2015 FIFA Women's World Cup qualification.

== In Mexico ==
=== National team ===
==== 1971 World Cup protest ====
In 1970, the Torino-based Federation of Independent European Female Football (FIEFF) ran the 1970 Women's World Cup in Italy without the involvement of FIFA. In the finals of the 1971 Women's World Cup, hosted by Mexico and played at Estadio Azteca in front of an estimated 110,000 or 112,500 attendees, the Mexican team protested their lack of pay in the face of the tournament's profits from ticket sales, television revenues, and merchandising, and threatened to boycott the match.

== In Nigeria ==
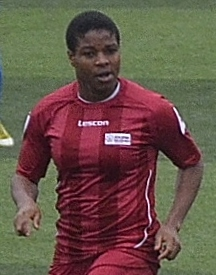
Nigerian forward Desire Oparanozie participated in the team's sit-in protest over unpaid bonuses in 2019.

=== National team ===
==== 2004 bonus protest ====
After winning the 2004 African Women's Championship in Johannesburg, South Africa, the Nigerian national team's players were not paid bonuses promised by the Nigeria Football Association (NFA). The team staged a sit-in protest at their hotel for three days until the bonuses were paid. The protest required the intervention of Nigerian president Olusegun Obasanjo, who chastised the protest as a "national embarrassment" on 21 October 2004 but also paid the bonuses to the sports ministry.

Super Falcons player Vera Okolo said the NFA provided the team with only three sets of kit, making the team unable to exchange them with opponents. Players had expected to receive bonuses after each match but did not, and were provided only garri as a beverage instead of food after two of the matches, until Nigerians in South Africa who learned of the team's conditions provided their own food to the players. In a 2020 interview, team manager Godwin Izilien said the South Africa Football Association provided lodging to staff but no food to the team, and that he had yet to be paid his own bonus for managing the team to victory.

==== 2007 back pay protest ====
At the 2007 FIFA Women's World Cup in China, the Nigerian national team's players boycotted training after the team's second group-stage match against North Korea over back pay bonuses. The NFA resolved the dispute on the day prior to the final group-stage match against the United States on 18 September 2007.

==== 2016 back pay protest ====
After winning the 2016 Women's Africa Cup of Nations, the Nigerian national team's players were not paid bonuses of US$23,650 due to them from the Nigeria Football Federation (NFF). On 6 December 2016, the players occupied a hotel in the Nigerian capital of Abuja and refused to leave until they were paid. The sit-in protest lasted for 13 days and included a march on the National Assembly and President Muhammadu Buhari's home to demand payment.

==== 2019 back pay protest ====
After reaching the round of 16 in the 2019 FIFA Women's World Cup and losing to Germany, the national team again threatened a sit-in protest demanding payment of unpaid fees and bonuses dating back to 2016. On 23 June 2019, the team met with Nigeria Women Football League president Aisha Falode in their World Cup hotel in Grenoble, France, and remained there until the NFF agreed to pay the outstanding fees. A month after the protest at the 2019 Ladies In Sport conference in Lagos on 30 July 2019, team captain Desire Oparanozie demanded equal pay with the men's team, citing the team's eight consecutive World Cup qualifications.

In 2021, former men's national team captain Sunday Oliseh accused the NFF of excluding women's team captain Desire Oparanozie from the team despite her form in Division 1 Féminine. Oliseh had also been removed from national team contention over a 2002 labor dispute. The NFF denied the allegation and said Oparanozie would still have a future with the team.

==== 2022 bonus dispute ====
At the 2022 Women's Africa Cup of Nations, the Nigerian national team's players boycotted training and refused to leave their hotel before their third-place match against Zambia over unpaid bonuses as well as unpaid daily allowances for the first five days of camp. The NFF resolved the dispute on the day prior to the match.

==== 2023 World Cup players' dispute ====
Prior to departing for the 2023 FIFA Women's World Cup on 2 July 2023, NFF general secretary Mohammed Sanusi told players that the federation would not pay the team match bonuses, nor would they receive a previously offered 30-percent share of a US$1.56 million grant from FIFA for reaching the tournament's group stage. After arriving to their hotel in Gold Coast, Queensland, senior players Onome Ebi, Rasheedat Ajibade, Asisat Oshoala, Osinachi Ohale, Tochukwu Oluehi, and Desire Oparanozie discussed a potential response, including the possibility of striking and boycotting their opening group-stage match against Canada. Players said NFF justified cancelling bonuses because FIFA had agreed to directly pay group-stage players $30,000. The 23-player squad unanimously voted to take action, and requested assistance from international players' union FIFPRO. On 8 July, Ebi denied that the team had planned to boycott the match.

==== 2023 World Cup managers' dispute ====
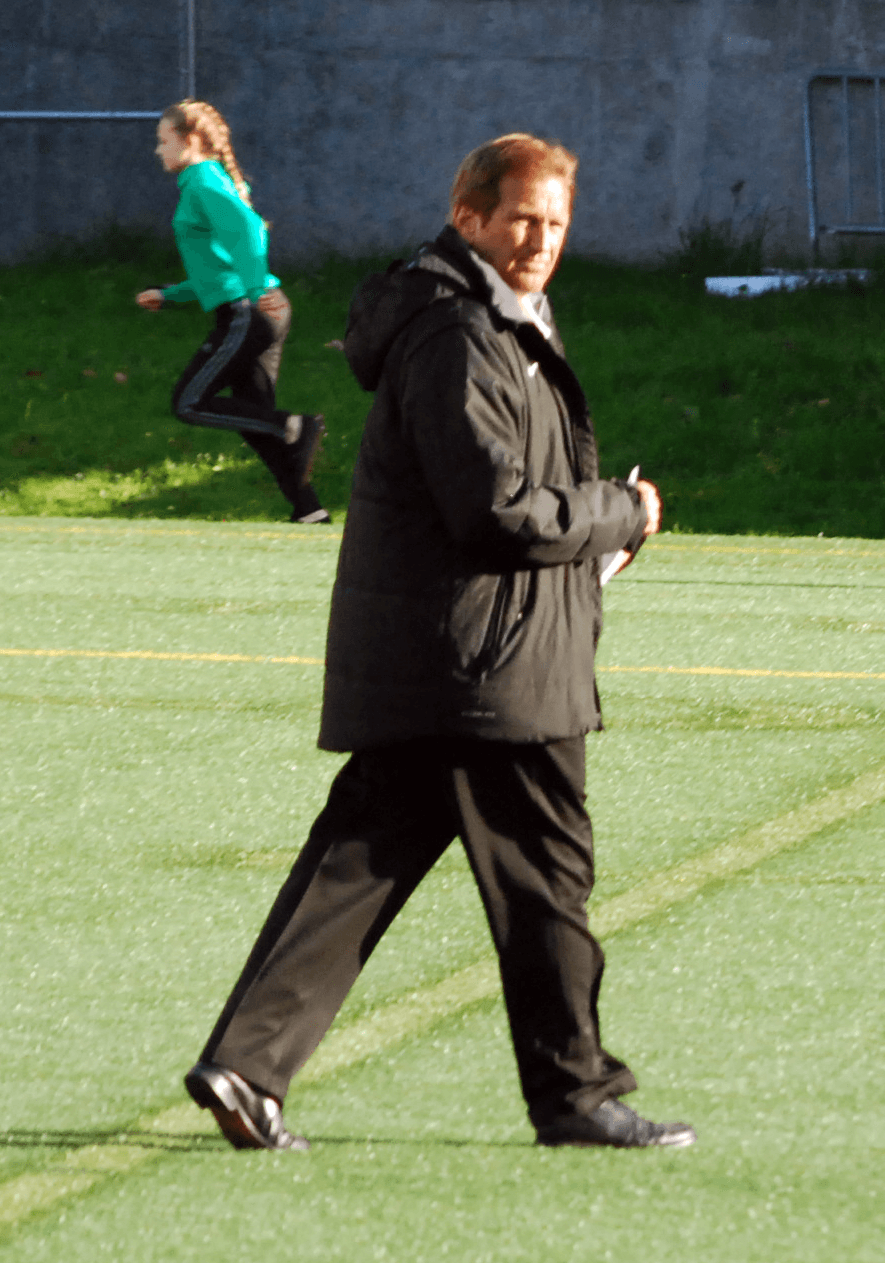
Randy Waldrum levelled several claims against the Nigeria Football Federation before the 2023 FIFA Women's World Cup

On 28 June, Nigeria manager Randy Waldrum described problems he encountered with the NFF during the Super Falcons' preparations in an interview on the American "Sounding Off of Soccer" podcast. On 6 July, in another podcast interview with journalist Alasdair Howarth on "On the Whistle", Waldrum also claimed that he was owed 14 months' pay and had received half of it, and that some players had still not received pay due two years prior or daily expense reimbursement for the team's 2022 Women's Africa Cup of Nations campaign. On 7 July, Waldrum more pointedly questioned where a $960,000 grant from FIFA to the NFF intended for the Super Falcons had gone. In response, NFF spokesperson Ademola Olajire called Waldrum an "incompetent loudmouth" and "Mr. Blabbermouth Waldrum", and described Waldrum as the worst manager in the team's history. Waldrum's assistant coach Lauren Gregg alleged on 8 July that the NFF had retaliated by preventing her from traveling with the team to the World Cup over a dispute with the federation over goalkeeper selection.

== In Norway ==
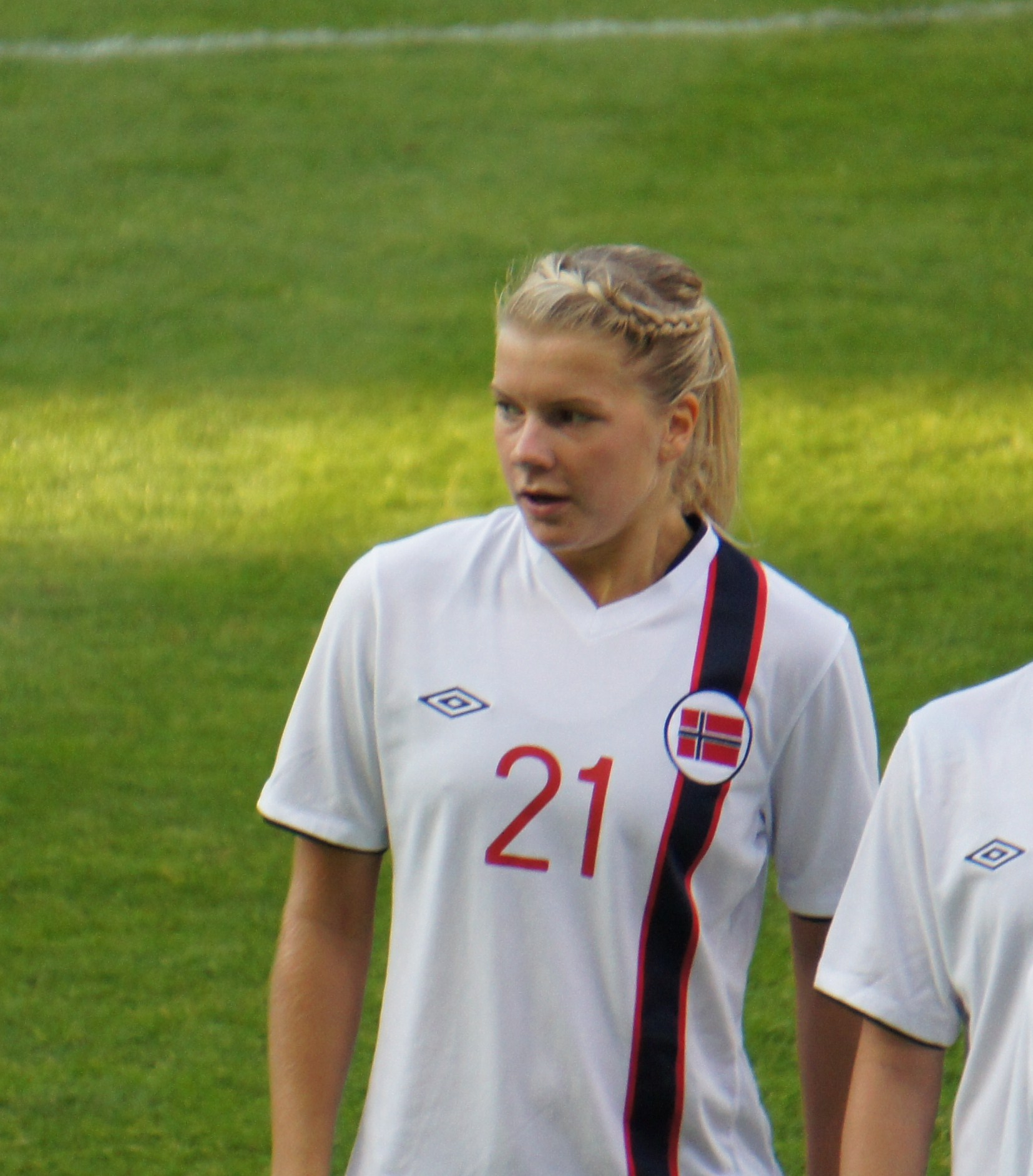
Norwegian forward Ada Hegerberg withdrew from national team play for five years over a dispute with the national team over communication and treatment.

In August 2017, Norwegian national team forward Ada Hegerberg abruptly retired from international play while criticizing the Norwegian Football Federation's (NFF) communication and response to criticism.

In October 2017, the NFF proposed a deal to equalize pay structures between the men's and women's national teams. The men's and women's teams jointly signed the agreement in December 2017. Hegerberg declined to return and sat out of the 2019 FIFA Women's World Cup and publicized discrepancies in treatment, such as the assignment of poor-quality training pitches during World Cup qualifiers, late and incorrectly sized equipment, and being told "you women complain too much" after raising concerns. She returned to the national team in March 2022 for the UEFA Women's Euro 2022 following changes in federation staff and promises to professionalise the national team, and her own recovery from an anterior cruciate ligament injury.

== In Spain ==
=== National team ===
==== 2022–23 player dispute ====
In September 2022, fifteen players sent an email removing themselves from national team consideration. Seven players who did not sign the letter claimed they were pressured by their club, Real Madrid, not to do so, a claim the club denied. The initial player complaints included poor quality of training under manager Jorge Vilda and his staff compared to their club environment, a lack of tactical preparation for matches, and claims of a controlling environment in which players would be frequently questioned about their whereabouts and shopping purchases. RFEF president Luis Rubiales publicly supported Vilda. By April 2023, many of the players had entered talks with the federation.

==== 2023 World Cup sexual misconduct dispute ====
Vilda remained in place for the 2023 FIFA Women's World Cup, which Spain won on 21 August 2023. During celebrations of their victory, Vilda allegedly groped a female assistant and Rubiales grabbed his crotch while standing in the authorities' box next to 16-year-old Infanta Sofía, forcefully kissed midfielder Jenni Hermoso on the lips without her consent during the medal ceremony, and entered the team locker room to propose marriage to Hermoso in jest.

After a public outcry, Rubiales initially called detractors "idiots". As the public response grew, Vilda and Rubiales allegedly attempted to persuade Hermoso and her family to endorse a public apology from Rubiales, and RFEF released a statement purportedly from Hermoso downplaying the act. Local reports suggested the statement had been coerced, and Hermoso personally then issued a statement suggesting that only the player union FUTPRO and her agent would speak on her behalf. Among the entities calling for Rubiales to resign were players' unions Association of Spanish Footballers (AFE) and Unión General de Trabajadores, and Spain's domestic women's league Liga F.

Rubiales declined to resign. FIFA then opened a disciplinary case against Rubiales on 24 August, and RFEF convened an emergency meeting on the situation on 25 August, where they also announced the opening of an internal investigation into a potential violation of the federation's behavioural code for sexual violence.

=== Primera División ===
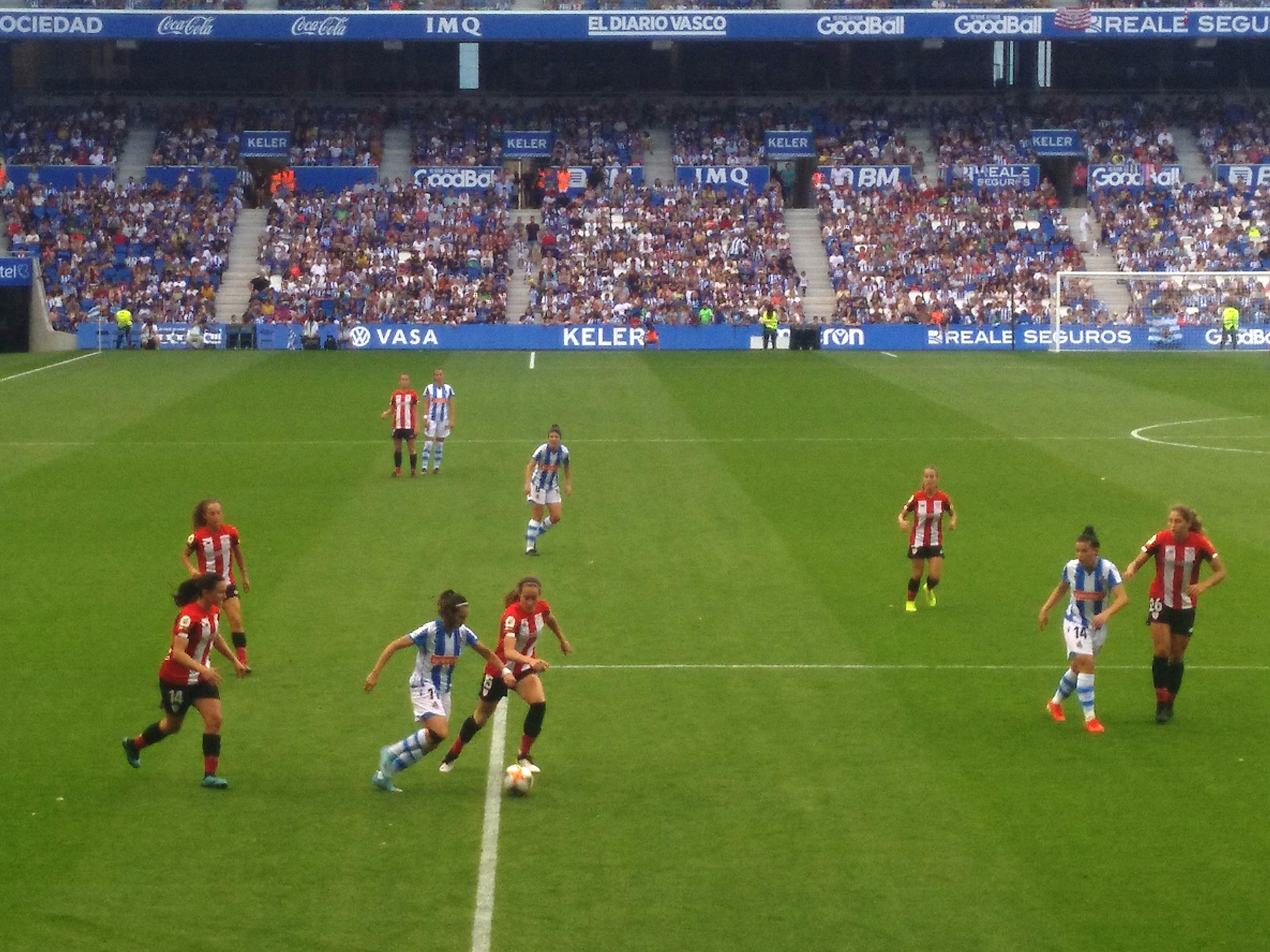
Primera División players went on strike on 22 October 2019, in the middle of the 2019–20 season, over minimum salaries and pregnancy leave protections.

==== 2019 strike ====
On 22 October 2019, during the 2019–20 Primera División season, the players of the league supported by the AFE voted almost unanimously in favour of taking strike action. The strike came after a year of negotiations in which the players had sought to improve minimum salaries up to €20 000 for full-time players and the introduction of protections for pregnancy leave, but which the league was unwilling to offer. The strike was called off in mid-November, after the league announced it would be willing to return to negotiations toward a new collective bargaining agreement (CBA). An agreement was reached in late-December, increasing minimum full-time salaries to €16 000 per year. The CBA also introduced rules on working hours and paid leave, including maternity leave, and protection of employment during pregnancy. Pregnancy protections were particularly notable, as under Spanish law the women's league could not be considered professional and therefore was exempt from professional regulation. This allowed clubs to add anti-pregnancy clauses to player contracts allowing clubs to terminate players without compensation should they become pregnant.

==== 2020–22 push for professionalization ====
The Spanish government's sports council, the Consejo Superior de Deportes (CSD) controls whether sports leagues in Spain are considered to be professional, and as of 2019 had conferred professional status to only men's football and men's basketball leagues. Its rulings until 22 December 2022 were defined by the Sports Law of 1990. The council also allowed only one league per sport to be considered professional and considered men's and women's football leagues to be of the same sport, thus allowing only the men's league to be professionalized. Other leagues were designated as "assimilated", which allowed for players to be paid salaries but did not formally or legally recognize them as professionals nor grant them regulatory protections. A formal labour relationship between employers and players was among the prerequisites for a league's professional status.

The RFEF operated the women's top-tier Primera División, which was not considered professional and had only a fraction of its teams operating with professional pay or standards. RFEF operated the league's front office, organized the competition, and employed the referees.

On 6 May 2020 as a result of the COVID-19 pandemic, RFEF cancelled the rest of the 2019–20 Primera División and suspended the league, but allowed the men's professional La Liga to continue play. This raised questions from La Liga's head of women's football, Pedro Malabia, about the women's league's lack of professionalization. In the same month, the employers' ACFF applied for recognition by CSD as a professional league, citing the league's 2019 CBA with players and other professional traits as sufficient for the designation.

On 10 June 2020, the RFEF granted Primera División and second-tier Primera Federación professionalized status, RFEF's own designation that it had recently approved to establish minimum standards for clubs. On 15 June 2021 and starting with the 2021-22 Primera División, the cSD allowed the league became fully professional and contracted from 18 teams to 16. The move was welcomed by the AFE. This necessitated the formation of a parallel organizational body for professional women's football, the Professional Women's Football League (LPFF), which then employed La Liga as its commercial agent.

On 22 December 2022, the Sports Law of 1990 was repealed, and the new law 39/2022 privatized some aspects of sports management, addressed some inequalities between men's and women's sport, provided protections for pregnant players, and promoted equal visibility of men's and women's sport in media.

== In South Africa ==
On 2 July 2023, three days before departing for the 2023 FIFA Women's World Cup, the South Africa women's national football team threatened to boycott a send-off match against Botswana at Tsakane Stadium in Brakpan, South Africa. Players raised concerns about the quality of the venue, the poor state of the partially clay pitch and related injury risks, and World Cup compensation from the federation beyond what FIFA would directly provide. Players also noted the low quality of Botswana as a preparatory opponent; the team was ranked 150th in the FIFA Women's World Ranking and had never qualified for a World Cup. South Africa forward Jermaine Seoposenwe also suggested that the association had not done enough to prepare the players for the tournament.

In response, an anonymous South African Football Association official described players as "mercenaries" and "traitors" to the media, and the association told players to return home and attempted to recruit a team of replacements to play the match. Teams of the SAFA Women's League reportedly declined to provide players, leading to the association delaying the match by an hour in order to recruit local players, who were as young as 13 years old, to a replacement senior team. The replacement Banyana Banyana squad lost to Botswana 5–0. The association engaged the South African Football Players Union in negotiations to attempt to resolve the conflict before the World Cup, and premier of Gauteng Panyaza Lesufi as mediator.

== In Taiwan ==
On 27 November 2020, Taiwanese players launched the Taiwan Women's Football Players' Association to improve facilities, playing conditions, and medical treatment, as well as to advocate for equal pay for national team players with men's national team players and negotiate salaries for women's clubs. The union was Taiwan's first for women athletes in any sport. Its first chairwoman is Wang Hsiang-huei, who played professionally in Japan, China, and Taiwan. The union was publicly supported by Taiwan's progressive political parties and Taiwan's professional baseball players' union.

=== National team ===
The national team not only qualified for the 2022 AFC Women's Asian Cup, its first in 14 years, but also reached the knockout stage, drew with the Philippines in regulation, and lost only after a penalty shoot-out. During a post-match press conference, forward Su Yu-hsuan expressed hopes for more high-quality training facilities, as the team were the only participants in the tournament that lacked a permanent training venue, and the best-available pitches for training were both under renovation. The Players' Association was subsequently consulted in February 2022 on designs for a new venue that could serve as a training facility.

== In the United States ==
=== National team ===
==== 2014–15 artificial turf dispute ====
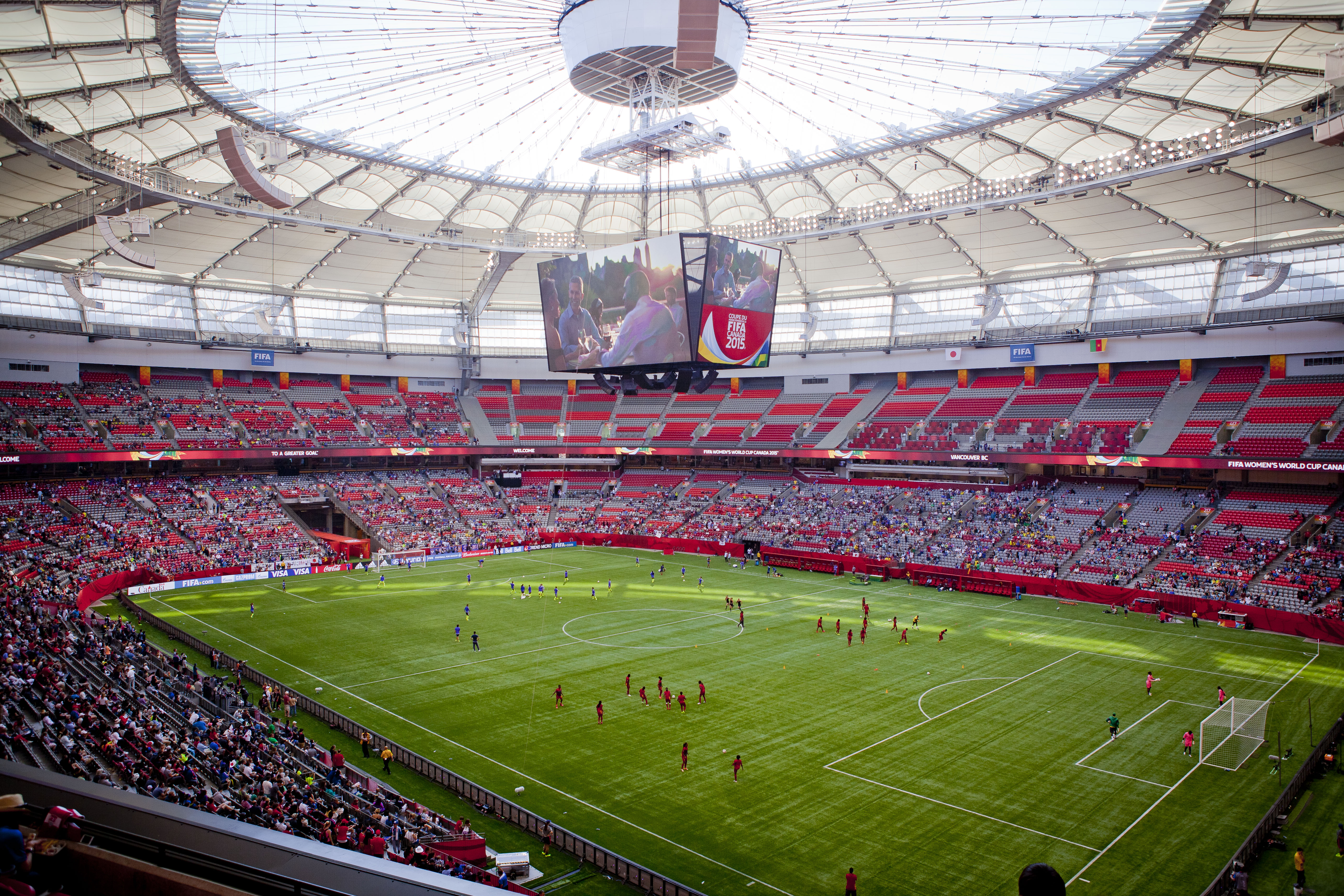
Players sued FIFA over the use of artificial turf at venues such as BC Place during the 2015 FIFA Women's World Cup.

In October 2014, United States women's team forward Abby Wambach led a lawsuit filed against FIFA alleging discrimination by the 2015 FIFA Women's World Cup including venues using artificial turf. The lawsuit, filed with the Human Rights Tribunal of Ontario, included American players Alex Morgan and Heather O'Reilly, Japanese player Homare Sawa, Brazilian players Marta and Fabiana, Spanish player Veronica Boquete, and German player Nadine Angerer as plaintiffs. The suit noted that men's teams always played World Cup matches on grass, including the laying of sod over artificial turf in venues using it. United States men's team goalkeeper Tim Howard supported the women's claim, as did actor Tom Hanks and NBA player Kobe Bryant.

FIFA refused to negotiate, the tribunal denied a request by the players for an expedited hearing, and Canada Soccer rejected a proposal from the Tribunal to mediate the dispute. FIFA secretary general claimed in a press conference that the players' discrimination claims were "nonsense". In January 2015, the players withdrew the lawsuit. The United States national team participated in and won the tournament. Wambach described the surface as "kind of a nightmare".

After the tournament, the United States Soccer Federation (USSF) staged a 10-match victory tour of friendlies featuring the United States national team. On 5 December 2015, the national team's players withdrew from a match scheduled for December 6 against the Trinidad and Tobago national team in Hawaii's Aloha Stadium, which uses artificial turf. Commentator and former United States national team player Julie Foudy posted a photo to Twitter of the turf in front of goal being pulled up by hand from the surface and fears about unnecessary injury risks to players, and criticized USSF for not inspecting the venue or having a policy comparable to the men's team about surface conditions. The following day, players published an open letter to USSF explaining that the issue was about inequality in playing conditions.

The national team made the turf dispute a plank in their arguments for improved conditions in collective bargaining agreement (CBA) negotiations in 2016. However, after agreeing to a new CBA in April 2017 that stated that the federation would prefer grass over artificial turf, USSF scheduled three home women's national team matches in 2017 on artificial turf surfaces.

As part of a proposed settlement in 2020 of a gender discrimination lawsuit filed by United States national team players in 2016, the women's team would not be required to play home matches on artificial turf. The 2022 CBA signed by players and the USSF includes a provision that the U.S. Women's National Team Players Association must agree to play at a venue using artificial turf, and that USSF must inspect and agree that the surface is safe.

==== 2016 pay dispute ====
Starting in 2016, members of the United States women's national soccer team (USWNT) have engaged in a series of legal actions against the United States Soccer Federation, accusing the organization of unequal treatment and compensation. The fight for equal pay has received widespread media attention, inspired legislative action in the U.S. Senate, and received popular support, including fan chants of "Equal pay" at the 2019 FIFA Women's World Cup matches in France. A landmark equal pay agreement was reached in February 2022.

=== National Women's Soccer League (NWSL) ===
==== Accommodations complaints ====
On 15 August and 17 August 2015, Portland Thorns FC forwards Alex Morgan and Christine Sinclair alleged that the Adam's Mark hotel in Kansas City was infested with bed bugs and mold. The hotel was provided by FC Kansas City for the Thorns. The NWSL apologized and published a statement noting that FC Kansas City had changed hotels for the remainder of the season.

On 9 July 2016, Western New York Flash hosted Seattle Reign FC at Frontier Field, a baseball stadium. Unable to convert the baseball diamond, the pitch was lined in the stadium's outfield and undersized by FIFA professional standards.

On 12 July 2016, Seattle Reign FC goalkeeper Hope Solo published a blog post alleging several ongoing issues with accommodations and facilities at NWSL clubs, including faulty or improperly sized equipment, poor hotels for away matches and inadequate housing in home markets, a lack of traveling staff, dirty showers, and inadequate security. One instance involved the team being co-housed with a 2016 furry convention, which Solo incorrectly alleged was a pornography convention. Solo retired from Reign FC six weeks later after being suspended by USSF during the 2016 Summer Olympics, but restated those complaints in 2022 following the 2021 NWSL abuse scandal.

==== 2021 age limit dispute ====
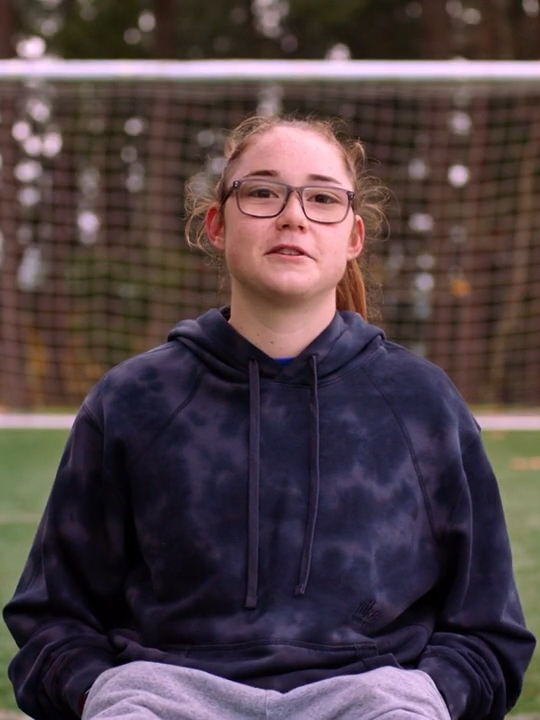
In 2021, Portland Thorns FC and midfielder Olivia Moultrie, then 15 years old, jointly filed an antitrust suit against the NWSL over a rule prohibiting teams from signing players under the age of 18.

On 4 May 2021, Portland Thorns FC and youth player Olivia Moultrie sued the NWSL over its minimum age limit, which prevented Thorns FC from signing 15-year-old Moultrie. The lawsuit claimed the rule violated United States antitrust law and was anticompetitive in nature. The league argued that as a single entity, it could not be anticompetitive. However, Judge Karin Immergut noted in a temporary restraining order that the NWSL might not meet the legal standard for a single-entity organization, being instead a collection of independent teams competing for talent, and that the age rule therefore would violate section 1 of the Sherman Antitrust Act. If such a ruling became permanent, other league rules that relied on its single-entity structure could be similarly contested. On 18 June 2021, Immergut granted Moultrie a preliminary injunction allowing her to sign an NWSL contract, which the league stated that it would appeal to the United States Court of Appeals for the Ninth Circuit on the grounds that the league was negotiating a CBA with the NWSL Players Association (NWSLPA) that would codify an age rule negotiated with players.

On 30 June 2021, Moultrie officially signed a three-year professional contract with the NWSL to play for Portland Thorns FC. On 30 July 2021, Moultrie and her attorneys settled their lawsuit with the NWSL out of court, which allowed Moultrie to sign with the league but left the league's age rule otherwise prohibiting players under the age of 18 intact. The settlement also allowed any age rule eventually agreed upon in the league's CBA with the NWSLPA to make Moultrie ineligible again. The CBA, signed in 2023, instead included a special entry process for under-18 players.

==== 2021 abuse scandal ====
Following a series of reports, suspensions, and firings of coaches and management staff during the 2021 NWSL season related to alleged abuses by coaches and staff over most of the league's existence, the league and NWSLPA launched a joint investigation into reported abuse across all NWSL teams. On 14 December 2022, the investigation released a report that claimed the NWSL's culture, forged in part by the fact that its two predecessor leagues, the Women's United Soccer Association and Women's Professional Soccer had folded, which discouraged players from reporting misconduct. The NWSL had also not established a firm definition of "misconduct". The report also noted that the league had failed to adequately vet technical staff. The joint report, and separate Yates Report commissioned by the USSF, resulted in the suspensions, firings, or banning of several head coaches, assistant coaches, and general managers across the league, and the establishment of a league office for player safety.

==== 2021 referee unionization ====
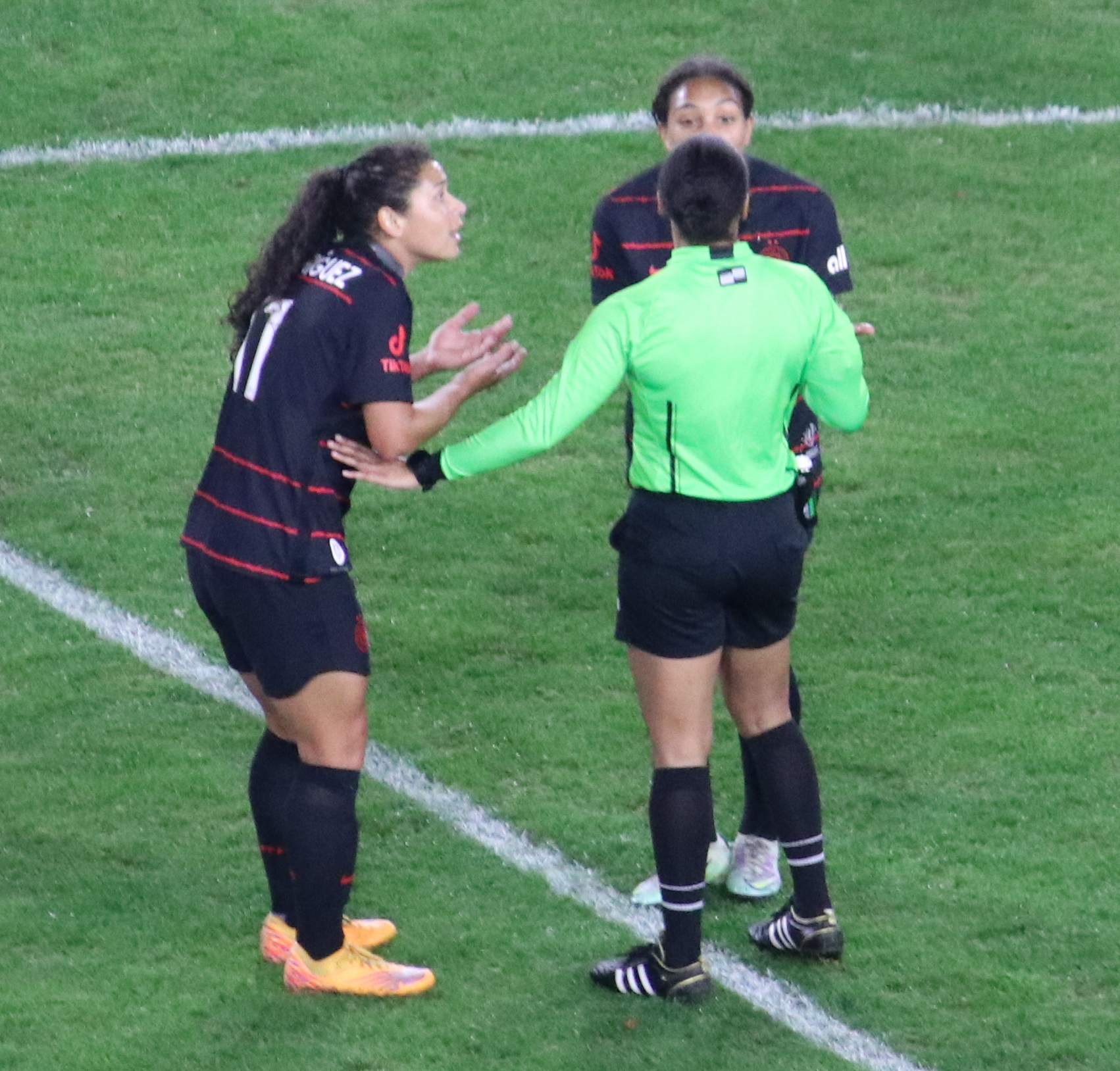
The Professional Referee Organization contested the attempts of NWSL referees to unionize and collectively bargain for improved conditions.

Referees for professional matches in the United States are drawn from the Professional Referee Organization (PRO), a company jointly founded by Major League Soccer (MLS) and the USSF. However, unlike referees of the men's top-division Major Soccer League, referees for the top-division NWSL are drawn from a secondary tier shared with men's second- and third-division leagues, known as PRO2. These officials are assigned to NWSL and lower-division men's leagues with a goal of being promoted to MLS duty, with most of PRO's funding coming from MLS. In 2022, NWSL center referees were considered independent contractors and paid $461 per match, which was less than the $529 paid to referees of the men's second division USL Championship.

PRO2 referees reported sleeping in hotel lobbies before games because they were unable to find lodging, working with frequently rotating crews, dealing with poor venue accommodations such as lack of changing rooms, and lacking paid leave for pregnancy. PRO2 referees also remarked on a lack of access to developmental training, coaching, and assessments; low-quality training webinars that lack sufficient detail; a lack of match footage to review and improve on their own performance; a "fear-based" approach to assignment that left officials uncertain whether they would be allowed to continue working; and a lack of access to fitness, physical training, and recovery resources.

PRO referees are members of the Professional Soccer Referees Association (PSRA), but as independent contractors PRO2 referees were not considered included in that organization's collective bargaining agreement (CBA). About 80 referees from the top three groups of PRO2 attempted to organize and form a bargaining unit under PSRA, which PRO refused to voluntarily recognize. PSRA escalated to the National Labor Relations Board to rule on whether PRO2 referees were employees of PRO and eligible to unionize, and the NLRB ruled in the referee's favor in October 2021. PRO2 officials voted on 30 November 2021 to unionize with a 68–3 vote in favor that was certified by the NLRB on 8 December 2021. However, PRO then challenged the October 2021 ruling, which PSRA described as "union-busting tactics". PRO was negotiating a CBA with the PSRA in May 2022 before withdrawing its NLRB appeal in July 2022, and on 14 April 2023 the PRO2 referees voted to ratify their first CBA with PRO.

==== 2023 collective bargaining agreement ====
The NWSLPA began negotiations with the NWSL toward its first collective bargaining agreement (CBA) in March 2021. An NWSL CBA would be the first ever negotiated for a professional women's football league in the United States. During the negotiations, the NWSLPA launched a campaign to highlight how some NWSL players were paid so little for their play that many worked multiple jobs in addition to their full-time workload as professional footballers to supplement their income. Using a social media hashtag of "#NoMoreSideHustles", Emily Menges, Jessica McDonald, Kristen Hamilton, Gabby Seiler, Brooke Elby, Caroline Stanley, Kat Williamson, DiDi Haračić, Darian Jenkins, and other active and retired players shared stories about working multiple jobs while having no control over where they place, with the potential to be traded and relocated to distant cities with little or no warning. The campaign was promoted by the AFL-CIO.

The union and league ratified the agreement on 31 January 2022, less than a day before players were expected to report to clubs for the 2022 preseason, with players prepared to enact a work stoppage on 1 February. The agreement provided improvements to player salaries and benefits, facilities, parental and mental health leave, and initial steps toward free agency for long-tenured players. It also prevented the league from playing on surfaces that required "substantial conversion" to the dimensions of a football pitch, such as the baseball stadiums employed by OL Reign and Kansas City Current in 2022, and granted players control over their name and image license rights. The association worked with players' unions of other professional sports leagues to help draft the CBA, particularly the Women's National Basketball Players Association, and also worked to make the NWSL CBA public.

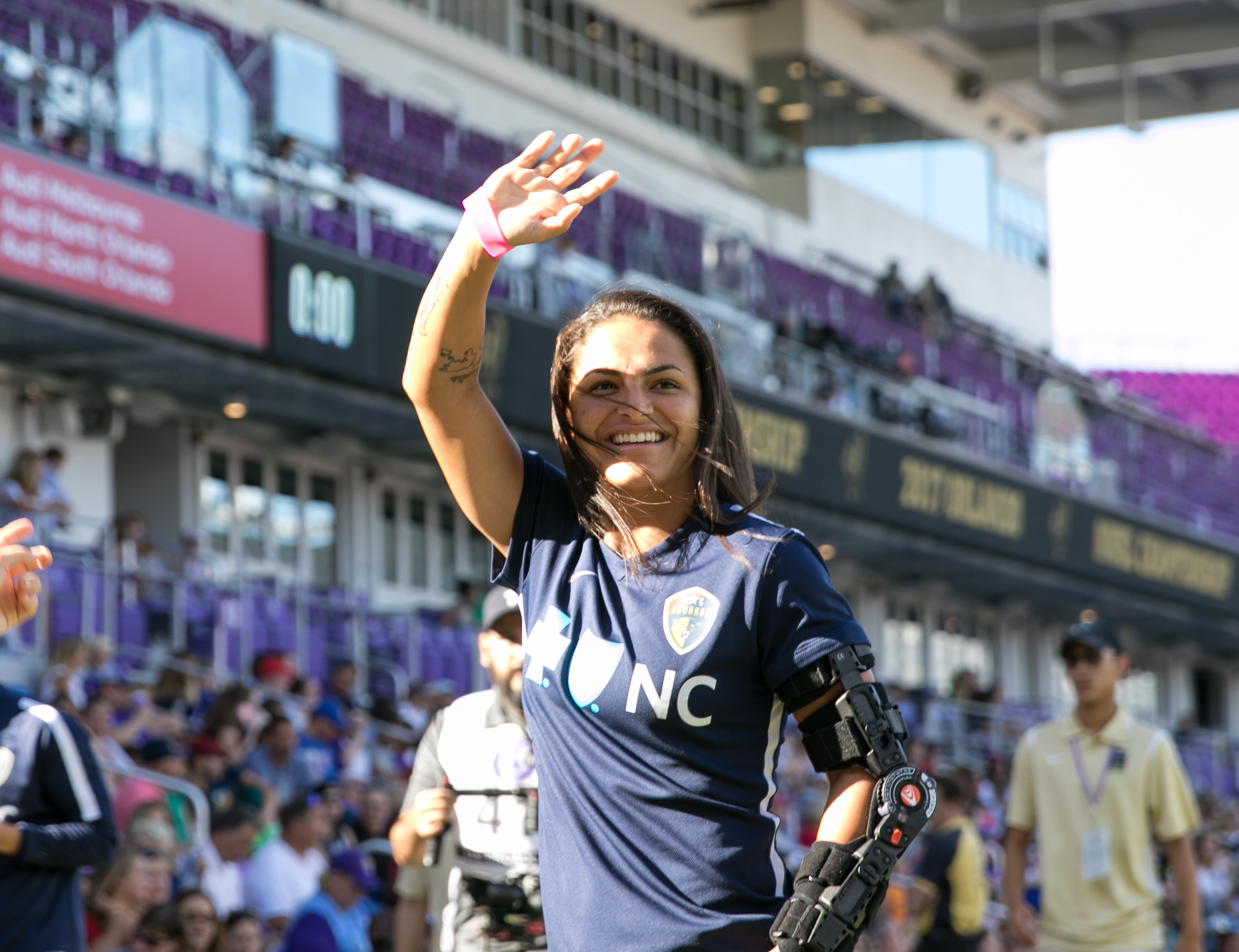
Debinha was one of 22 NWSL players whose free agency was disputed by the league in 2023. Arbitration, negotiated for in the league's CBA, confirmed her free agency and she signed with Kansas City Current.

==== 2023 free agency dispute ====
The new CBA provided sufficiently tenured NWSL players whose contracts were expiring as of 26 August 2022 the option to begin negotiating with clubs as free agents, which had been unavailable to NWSL players since the league's inception. However, the league interpreted this provision to exclude players whose contracts had unexercised options to extend, even if the club had not determined whether it would exercise the option. The league's interpretation would have delayed those players' negotiations until November 15, the deadline for clubs to exercise options. The NWSLPA disagreed on behalf of 22 affected players who had expected to begin negotiations in August.

The NWSLPA disputed the league's interpretation through an independent arbitrator per the CBA's terms, and on 17 October 2022, the arbitrator ruled in favor of the NWSLPA and granted free agency to 22 of the affected players. NWSLPA executive director Meghann Burke and NWSL commissioner Jessica Berman both praised the use of the new arbitration process to resolve the dispute. Among the newly declared free agents was Debinha, whose free-agency signing with Kansas City Current was among the highest-profile transactions in the league's first free agency period.
