= List of strikes in Jamaica =

Throughout the history of Jamaica, a number of strikes, labour disputes, student strikes, hunger strikes, and other industrial actions have occurred.

== Background ==
A labour strike is a work stoppage caused by the mass refusal of employees to work. This can include wildcat strikes, which are done without union authorisation, and slowdown strikes, where workers reduce their productivity while still carrying out minimal working duties. It is usually a response to employee grievances, such as low pay or poor working conditions. Strikes can also occur to demonstrate solidarity with workers in other workplaces or pressure governments to change policies.

== 20th century ==
=== 1930s ===
- British West Indian labour unrest of 1934–1939

=== 1950s ===
- 1956 Jamaican port strike

=== 1960s ===
- 1964 Jamaican broadcast strike, 97-day strike by Jamaica Broadcasting Corporation workers.

=== 1980s ===
- 1985 Jamaica general strike

== 21st century ==
=== 2010s ===
- Strike by players of the Jamaica women's national football team.

=== 2020s ===
- 2023 Jamaican teachers' strike

== See also ==
- History of Jamaica
