= 2019 Primera División strike =

The 2019 Primera División strike was a strike in late-2019 by the players of the Primera División, the top flight of women's football in Spain, following a breakdown of negotiations with the RFEF over salaries and working conditions. It marked one of the first strikes in women's football centered on a domestic league instead of a national team.

== Background ==
Between the 1930s and 1975, women were forbidden from playing football in Spain. After the ban was lifted, it took until 1980 for the Royal Spanish Football Federation (RSFF) to recognize women's football, until 1983 for the first official national competition to be played (the Copa de la Reina), and until 1988 for the first women's national league to be formed.

== Strike and negotiations ==
In October 2018, negotiations began between the players' union (the AFE) and the Association of Women's Football Clubs (ACFF). Among the key issues in the negotiations was the minimum wage - only a few clubs in the league were operating as fully professional, and even those that did often restricted working hours and paid only a small salary. The players' unions propose an increase in the league's minimum wage to €20000 per year for full-time professional players and an increase to €12000 per year for part-time professional players, whereas the ACFF proposed only €16000 for full-time players and only €8000 for part-time players. The players also sought a number of improvements in working conditions, such as protections for players having to take time off for pregnancies.

By late-2019, however, after over a year of negotiations and 18 different meetings, an agreement had yet to be reached between the players and the ACFF and negotiations broke down. On 22 October, players gathered in Madrid to decide on their next moves and, after two hours of debate, 93% of players in the league voted in favour of strike action. AFE vice-president Ainhoa Tirapu stated that "It's not just money - we have lowered our red lines, but nothing has been achieved... We must not be inactive and fight for our rights."

After the end of the international break that began at the beginning of November, a number of league games had to be cancelled due to the strike. On 18 November, the players announced that they would be lifting the strike, after reaching an agreement with the ACFF to resume negotiations for a new collective bargaining agreement.

In late December 2019, it was announced that an agreement had been reached between the players and the ACFF, resolving the labour dispute. The agreement included an increase in minimum wage up to €16000 for those with full-time professional contracts and up to €12000 for those with part-time professional contracts, the establishment of maternity leave protections, a commitment to protect players against harassment, and the introduction of a retirement bonus for players who have played at least six seasons for their club.

== See also ==
- U.S. women's national soccer team pay discrimination claim
- 2015 Australia women's national soccer team strike
- 2017 Denmark women's national football team strike
