= Aisha Falode =

Nigerian journalist

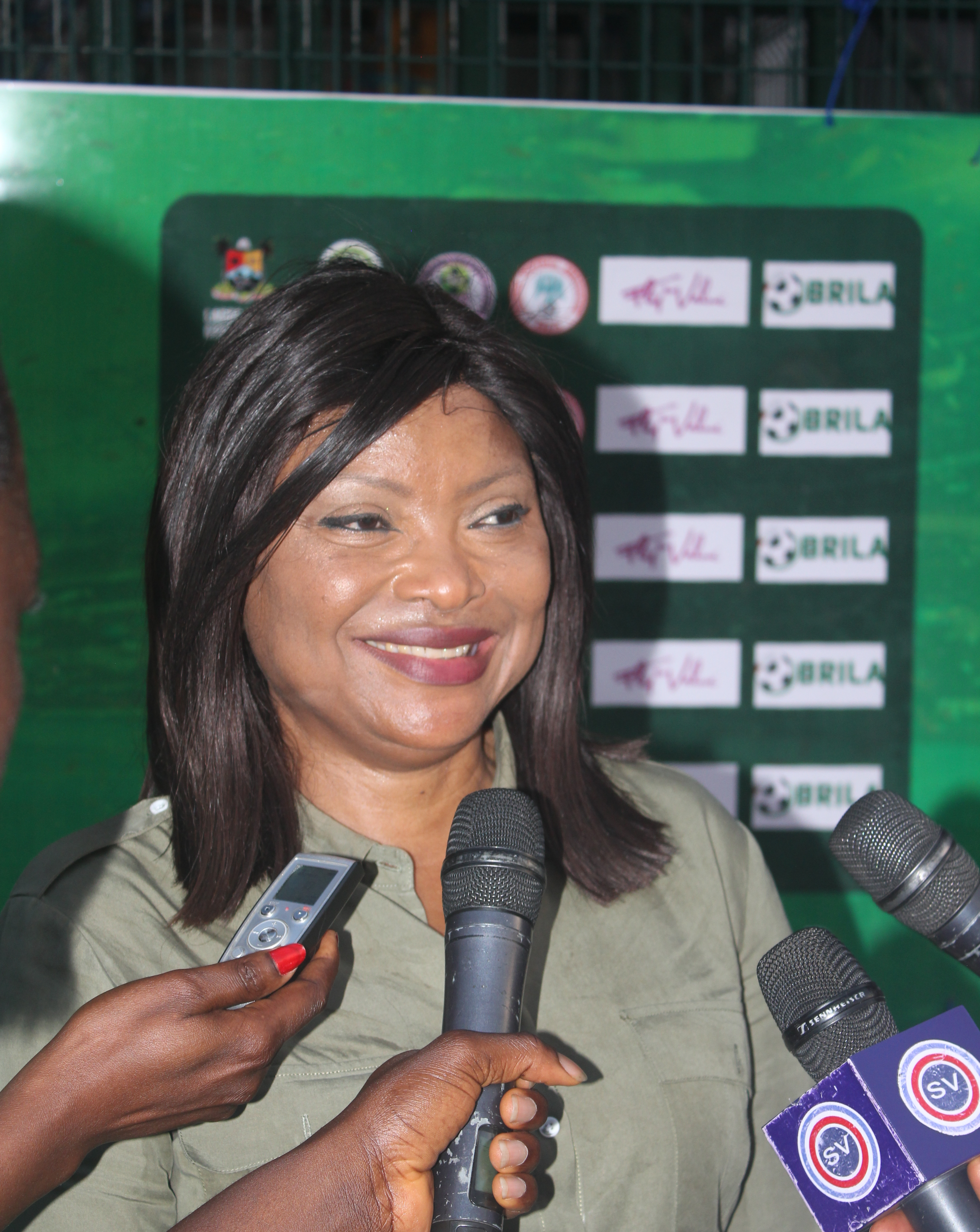
- Citizenship: Nigeria
- Education: Mass communication
- Occupations: Sports-journalist and Radio broadcaster
- Employer: NITEL
- Known for: President of Nigeria women football league ( 2017
- Title: Journalist

Aisha Falode is a sports journalist and radio broadcaster in Nigeria and president of Nigeria Women Football League (NWFL).

She worked briefly with NITEL (Nigerian Telecommunication Limited) and again with the Graduate Telephone Operators Scheme of the then NITEL. When Raymond Dokpesi was planning his own broadcasting station now known as the African Independent Television (AIT) she became involved. She acquired a graduate degree in Mass Communications.

In January 2017, she was inaugurated by Nigeria Football Federation as the head of Nigeria Women Football League, the body that organizes Aiteo Cup and Nigeria Women Premier League.
