= Macarena Sánchez =

Argentine footballer

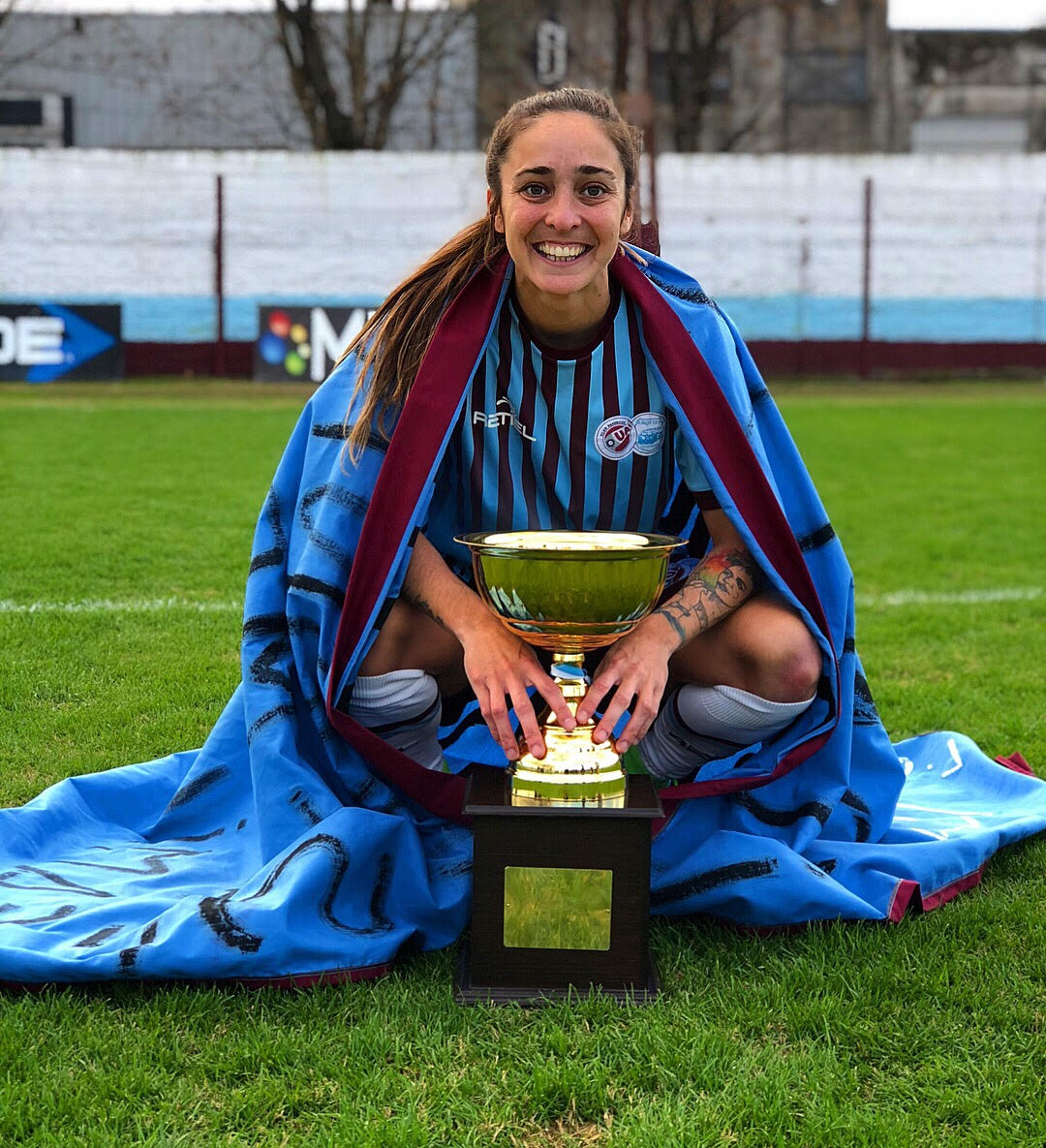
- Sánchez with UAI Urquiza in 2018

Personal information
- Full name: Macarena Sánchez Jeanney
- Date of birth: 28 December 1991 (age 34)
- Place of birth: Santa Fe, Santa Fe, Argentina
- Height: 1.70 m (5 ft 7 in)
- Position: Striker

Team information
- Current team: San Lorenzo

Senior career*
Years	Team	Apps	(Gls)
2006–2008	Universidad Nacional del Litoral		
2009	Colón		
2010	Universidad Nacional del Litoral		
2011	Logia Fútbol Club		
2012–2019	UAI Urquiza		
2019–	San Lorenzo		
- * Club domestic league appearances and goals

Macarena Sánchez Jeanney (born 28 December 1991), known as Macarena Sánchez or Maca Sánchez, is an Argentine footballer who plays as a striker for San Lorenzo. She previously played at Colón and Logia FC teams in the Santa Fe Women's Football League.

As a member of UAI Urquiza, Sánchez won several editions of the AFA Women's League. Her club finished second at the AFA Women's Gold Club in 2018. Sánchez also participated in three editions of the Copa Libertadores, with a best placement of third at the 2015 edition.

A self-described "football feminist", Sánchez has been active in trying to change the women's game from an unfunded forgotten amateur sport to a fully professional one. She was also active in other feminist issues, including supporting proposed changes to Argentina's abortion laws that would make the procedure legal.

In January 2019, Sánchez was let go by UAI Urquiza before the official start of pre-season. As she was being compensated but not contracted and was locked out from signing with a new team for the upcoming season, she sued UAI Urquiza and the Argentine Football Association alleging discrimination where professional women's players were wrongly treated as amateurs.

Three months later, Sánchez was one of fifteen players who joined San Lorenzo on a professional contract, a historic first for Argentine women's football.

== Early life ==
When Sánchez was a 5-year-old, she played football in Santa Fe in an informal way. She played with the boys in her neighborhood on the weekdays, and then went to watch her father play with his friends. Her father sometimes had her playing on his team. Her father encouraged her to play for a local club.

== Club career ==
It wasn't until 2006 that her professional career took off, playing for the women's club at Universidad Nacional del Litoral. This was followed by stints at Colón and Logia FC in the Santa Fe Women's Football League.

=== National League ===
In 2011, without any support and seeking a way to elevate her game, Sánchez moved from her native Santa Fe to Buenos Aires. At the time, she did not have a job or club lined up and was taking a major footballing risk. It took her a year to adapt to both the city, and the style of play with her new club.

It was not until 2012 when she began to participate in the First Women's Division as part of the UAI Urquiza Sports Club, an opportunity that arose after a friend in the city of Santa Fe, where the coach of the UAI, Diego Guacci, invited her to try out for the team. 2012 was the first year a national women's league existed in the country, with national competitions being organized informally prior to that. Her team finished first in the league's inaugural season.

In 2013, she was part of the UAI side that gave Vélez-All Boys a 22–0 thumping in the Torneo Inicial 2013. Sánchez opened the scoring for her team with a goal in the fifth minute. This was followed up by goals in the 16, 28, 32 and 40th minutes.

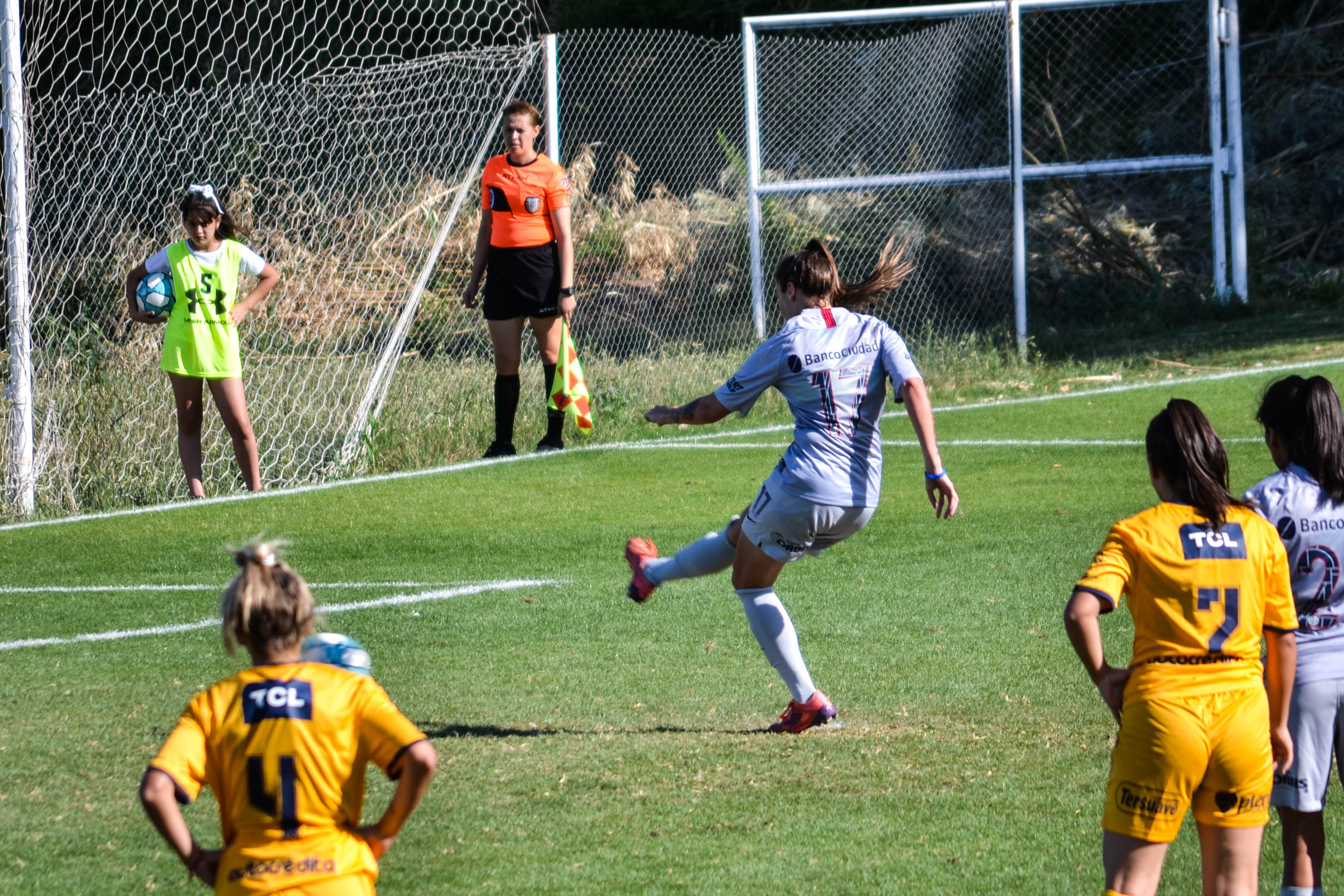
Sánchez taking a penalty kick for San Lorenzo in 2019

Her team won the 2016 edition of the AFA Women's League. In 2016, Sánchez scored the winning goal for the team in their championship run. Her team clinched first place and spot in Copa Libertadores in the seventeenth round, with a 5–0 victory against Puerto Nuevo. Sánchez contributed a goal in the win. When her team clinched their spot, they had 15 wins and 2 draws, scoring 85 goals while only allowing 8 goals against. Following the season, Sánchez and her team participated in the AFA Women's Tournament. Their opening match was against Independiente, where UAI claimed an 8–0 win with Sánchez providing one of those goals. Their second game in the tournament was against El Porvenir.

Sánchez was part of the club in 2018, when they won the National League. They beat Boca Juniors in the league playoffs to claim Argentina's only spot in Copa Libertadores. In the Gold Cup that followed the regular season, her team lost in the final to Boca Juniors 1–2.

=== Copa Libertadores ===
Sánchez played for UAI Urquiza in Copa Libertadores in 2015 and 2016. Her team finished third in the 2015 edition. In 2016, her team was eliminated in the first round. Sánchez scored a goal for her team in the classification round. Her team participated in the 2018 edition. UAI was the only team from Argentina to participate. They drew 1–1 in their opening match against Cerro Porteño. Their second match they won 1–0 against Flor de Patria. Their third game was against Iranduba. She did not play in any of the games her team played.

== Football feminism ==
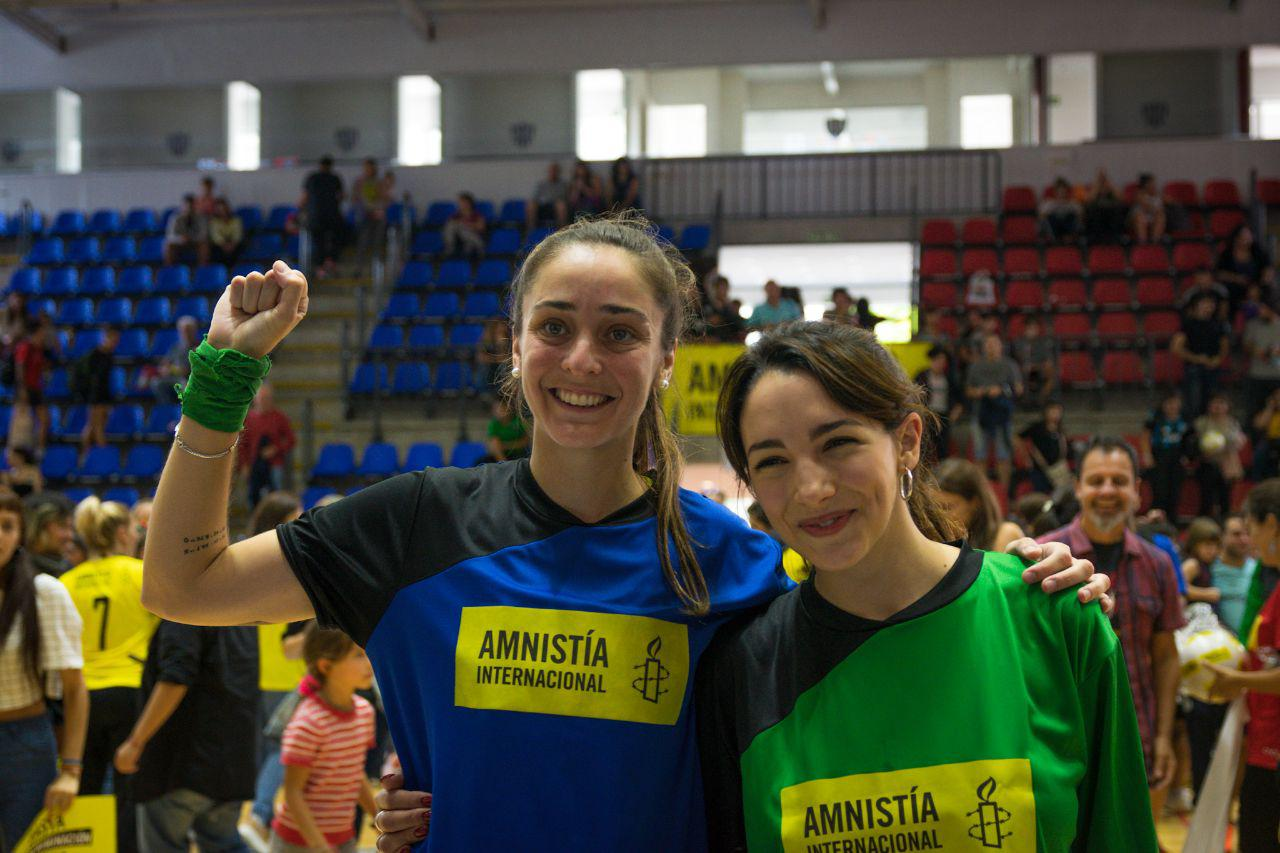
Sánchez with Argentine actress Thelma Fardin during a match organised by Amnesty International in 2019

Sánchez is a self-described football feminist. She was quoted by La Izquierda Diario as saying, "Women's football grows because women push it, but there are men who do not want us at that level". She was quoted in Clarín as saying, "I want to be a feminist and dissident footballer because we have to run away from the contamination that football has, which is very violated and polluted by the business, it is a lot of money and football, I would like to see it with a new identity and I think that is new. We can contribute to women's identity, and because we want to make a living from this."

While she loved football unconditionally as a young player, more exposure to the political side of the sport changed that. Her parents were the ones who inspired her foray into feminist political activism, having been politically active themselves. Having played internationally for her club, she perceives Argentina is being about in the middle in South America when it comes to support for the women's game. Her activism played a role in her decision to sue her club.

Sánchez has a tattoo of Frida Kahlo, which she got in 2017. She views it as an extension of her feminist beliefs as Khalo was: "at the time in which she lived, someone who fought for her rights with many things against her, such as the accident she suffered, but in the end she overcame everything. And she moved in a macho environment like painting, and could also achieve what she wanted."

The first edition of the Foro Sudamericano de Jugadoras de Fútbol took place in Chile in August 2018. It was organized by Asociación Nacional de Jugadoras del Fútbol Femenino. One of its goals was to address the need for professionalization in women's football in South America.

Sánchez made the news when she responded to a tweet with comments about her own lesbian sexuality, and support for women's football in late 2018. In December 2018, she also drew attention after suggesting professional football should be mixed gender. In December 2018, she was critical of the payout for men playing in the Madrid-hosted Copa Libertadores final, with women getting only US$110,000 in total prize money while men got US$103,850,000 in total prize money. In August 2018, she took to social media to support a 7-year-old girl who wanted to play for a boys team in her native Santa Fe.

In Argentina, there is still no hiding the gender discrimination that occurs in the world of sports. Macarena Sanchez has helped create progress however in her fight for feminism in sports. After being the first woman to take legal action against the Argentinian Soccer Federation, she has helped bring over the public eye to the unfair treatment of women in Argentinian soccer, who were being treated inferior to men. Throughout soccer matches, many women, such as Elba Selva, a star player for the Argentina team in the late 1900s, reports that she has been told by many crowds, even at home, to go back and wash dishes. When a professional Argentenian women's football team won their league cup, the male owners had forgotten to hand them their trophy, forcing the team to celebrate with a water jug. Throughout the years, many women have stood up and fought for change, however the fight for women's equality still has work. Recently, the Argentenian women's football team led by Sanchez decided to speak out against Adidas, who instead of showing off players in their new uniforms, used models.

== Lawsuit ==
In 2019, Sánchez made international headlines after suing her club and the Argentine Football Association, citing inequality between their treatment of the less successful men's club and the national champion women's team. The extent of the international media coverage was recognized in Argentine media on 7 February.

On 5 January 2019, while on vacation in Santa Fe, Sánchez was informed by coaching staff that she was cut from UAI Urquiza because of her political activity. Being cut right before the start of the official pre-season meant she was unable to sign with another team in the Argentine national league until June. On 18 January 2019, Sánchez, on the advice of her lawyers, filed an extrajudicial summons against the club. She cited the need for "the professional labor relationship between the sports entity and the player be recognized" as women's football players are treated as amateur players, and consequently do not sign contracts with their clubs. Instead, they have registration cards. At the same time, her club offered players incentives to join. This included per diems of 400 pesos, jobs that fit the club's training schedules, and university scholarships. On 21 January, Sánchez published a press release outlining her complaints to the media about her treatment by the club.

In her public allegations, Sánchez compared the current situation in Argentina to the situation for men's professional football in the country in the 1930s. She said in her press release, "These mechanisms are an exact replica of those used to deny recognition of the professional working relationship of male football players during the 1930s." She told the media she believes, despite the outpouring of support on social media, she does not believe she will ever play football again as the sport is so political that people will not allow her to join a club.

Sánchez was quoted in 20 minutos as saying her goals were, "The women's league in Argentina is precarious, the clubs and the Federation do not recognize us as workers and deny us basic conditions such as salary or basic tools for any athlete, such as places to train or equipment. [...] We also need medical coverage, be part of the union of footballers working in Argentina, and we need our rights to stop being violated as is happening until now." Her lawsuit made her the face of "feminist, dissident and professional" football.

== Personal ==
Sánchez was born on 28 December 1991 in Santa Fe, Argentina. As an undergraduate, she studied physical education. She studied social work as a Masters student following her move to Buenos Aires at the Universidad de Buenos Aires. Social work was a change, as she originally studied graphic design as a way of taking advantage of the scholarship opportunity given by her professional football club. During the mornings, Sánchez worked as an administrator. In the afternoon, she trained with her team. This arrangement was set up by her club president. It is a routine she has had since moving to Argentina's capital in 2012.

Argentina held a congressional vote about the legality of abortion. Sánchez was one of many women who took part in protests in support of abortion rights.

Her men's professional football loyalties lie with Colón.

== Honours ==
UAI Urquiza

- Primera División A (3): 2012, 2014, 2017–18

San Lorenzo de Almagro

- Primera División A (1): 2021 Ap
