= Nigeria Women Football League =

Sports governing body

NFF
- Headquarters: Abuja
- President: Nkechi Obi
- Website: www.thenwfl.com.com

The Nigeria Women Football League is the body responsible for organization the top three tiers of women's association football in Nigeria. They organize the NWFL Premiership, NWFL Championship and NWFL Nationwide leagues. Historically, the Nigeria Football Federation appoints the executive board for the NWFL.

== History ==
Since its inception, women's football in Nigeria was usually governed as a department of the NFF empowered to administer the leagues. Executive members and leaders of such committees included Gina Yesibo, Bola Ngozi Jegede and Haijia Omidiran. However, the Nigeria Women Football League was inaugurated as an institution capable of running its affairs using a more independent approach. Dilichukwu Onyedinma was appointed as the first chairperson of the body.

== Previous chairpersons ==
- Dilichukwu Onyedinma (???? to January 2017)
- Aisha Falode (January 2017 to July 2023)
- Nkechi Obi (July 2023 to present)
