= 2017 Denmark women's national football team strike =

The 2017 Denmark women's national football team strike was a two-month long strike by the players of the Denmark women's national football team. Supported by the players' union Spillerforeningen, the two-month long strike saw the eventual signing of a new collective bargaining agreement (CBA) between the players and the Danish Football Association (Danish: Dansk Boldspil-Union; DBU).

== Background ==
Until the 1970s, the DBU refused to admit women, despite Boldklubben Femina success at the unofficial 1970 Women's World Cup and the 1971 Women's World Cup. After the 1971 tournament, DBU chair Vilhelm Skousen declared that women would never be admitted as members during his lifetime, stating that women's football was just a fad and that "we cannot and will not take this seriously." However, in 1972, under orders from UEFA, the DBU finally began organizing women's football in the country and launched an official national team. The DBU's promotion of the sport, however, was minimal, with matches only arranged sporadically, stars such as Susanne Augustesen not being called up, and the existing sponsorship deals that had driven BK Femina's success being prohibited.

Despite the DBU's ambivalence, women's football in Denmark managed to grow significantly. In the UEFA Women's Euro 2017, Denmark finished in second place, after making it to the final for the first time and losing 4-2 to the Netherlands.

The second half of the 2010s saw several labor disputes between women's football national teams and their respective football federations. In 2015, the Australia women's national soccer team went on strike, the first time in history that an Australian national sporting team had gone on strike. In April 2016, five players on the United States women's national soccer team filed a pay discrimination claim against the United States Soccer Federation. In April 2017, the Republic of Ireland women's national football team almost went on strike over working conditions, and then, in August 2017, the Argentina women's national football team did go on strike over pay and conditions.

== Strike ==
Despite the success of the Danish national team at the 2017 Euros, negotiations to replace the expiring collective bargaining agreement between the players and the DBU stumbled. By September 2017, the negotiations had been ongoing for over nine months, with disputes particularly centered around the DBU's desire to stop classifying the women's national players as employees. The average salary for national team players at the time was 14 000 kroner (around 1880€) per month.

In mid-September, a scheduled friendly match between Denmark and the Netherlands was canceled due to the strike. Following the cancellation, Spillerforeningen offered the DBU two different proposals for a temporary agreement, including an offer from the men's side to transfer 500 000kr of their salaries to the women. The DBU rejected both agreements.

A scheduled World Cup qualifier match for 20 October against Sweden was then canceled due to the strike. FIFA deemed the match a forfeit, awarding Sweden a 3-0 victory. In response, DBU vice-president Kim Hallberg briefed the media against the players, stating that it was "a historically bad day for the women’s team and Danish football overall." A few days after the match, however, a temporary agreement was reached between the DBU and the players' union to ensure that the team would play the qualifier against Croatia scheduled for 24 October, amid fears that FIFA could disqualify the team from the 2019 World Cup.

On 18 November, the Danish women's national team was hit with a conditional penalty from UEFA, threatening them with suspension from tournaments if they failed to play a scheduled match again within the next four years. The DBU had already received a 20 000 € fine for the missed match against Sweden.

The strike was resolved in late November 2017 when the players signed a new CBA with the DBU. The new CBA included a 2 million kroner increase in investment and a 60% increase in player salaries if the team qualified for a major tournament.

== Aftermath ==
In September 2018, a pay dispute occurred between the players of the Danish men's national team and the DBU, leading to an entirely uncapped squad being named for the 2018 Slovakia v Denmark football match. The day after the match, a temporary agreement was reached with the players and, in late September, a new collective agreement for the men's senior national team was reached, lasting until 2024.

In 2021, Danish national team captain Pernille Harder stated that "the consequences [of the strike] with the World Cup were tough but in the end, it was worth it" and that football associations "feel a bigger pressure to improve things, and that’s because I feel more and more players are speaking up."
