= 2015 Australia women's national soccer team strike =

The 2015 Australia women's national soccer team strike was a two-month long strike by the players of the Australia women's national soccer team. Supported by the Professional Footballers Australia unions, the players successfully won improvements in pay and working conditions. It was the first time in history that an Australian national sporting team had gone on strike.

== Background ==
Women's soccer has been played in Australia since at least the 1880s, with competitions in the 1920s seeing significant success in drawing audiences. However, the global impact of the English Football Association ban on women's soccer then hit Australia, and the women's game entered a prolonged period of suppression.

The Australian Women's Soccer Association (AWSA) was founded in 1974 and Australia's first official international match was against New Zealand in October 1979. It would take until the 1983 OFC Women's Championship, however, for Australia to face a team other than New Zealand and until the 1987 Women's World Invitational Tournament to face European and American teams. The players at the time received no compensation and little support, having to sew themselves the own Australian crests onto the team tracksuits. The poor working conditions and lack of pay would continue throughout the 1990s, with players forced to train with second-hand equipment from the Socceroos, receiving few opportunities to practice, and with players even having to pay to be able to practice and travel with the team. In 1999, the players published a nude calendar in the hopes of raising funds for the team.

Following the 2000 Olympics, the Australian national team entered a period of turmoil, playing no games in 2001, many veteran players retiring, and with the AWSA going defunct, being absorbed by Soccer Australia (current Football Federation Australia).

In the 2010s, the national team began a period of sustained success. At the 2010 AFC Women's Asian Cup, they became the first Australian senior national soccer team (men or women) to make a final in the AFC and then became the first ever Australian soccer team to win in Asia after defeating North Korea in the final. At the 2011 FIFA World Cup, Caitlin Foord was awarded Best Young Player of the tournament.

The 2015 FIFA Women's World Cup was held in Canada from 6 June to 5 July 2015. Prior to the World Cup, the Australian national team players had been required to go through a full-time six-month training programme. Despite the significantly increased workload, however, the programme came without any change in pay for the players, forcing several to lose their employment elsewhere. Under the expiring collective bargaining agreement ("CBA"), the maximum pay for the Australian players that year was $21,000, significantly under the Australian minimum wage and significantly less than the highest salaries of the men's team, which reached over $200,000. The Australian team went on to make it to the quarter=finals of the World Cup, losing to Japan.

== Strike ==
In September 2015, the Australian women's national team was scheduled for a tour of the United States, including a couple of friendlies against the USWNT. A training camp in preparation for the tour was scheduled to take place in Sydney in early September.

On 8 September 2015, the players announced that they would not be attending the camp after negotiations with Football Federation Australia over a new CBA broke down. The players' union, the Professional Footballers Australia, released a statement saying that: "Following the expiration of the Matildas CBA, the players are under no contractual obligation to undertake any Matildas related activities. FFA has failed to recognise the significant sacrifices the Matildas players are forced to make in playing for their country." The players equally announced that they would be striking until they received better pay and working conditions. The key demands of the players were:

1. For the CBA to contain basic minimum standards, such as setting the level of commitment expected from the players in accordance with the pay they receive;
2. Equal pay;
3. Increases in spending on air travel, accommodation and benefits;
4. Better development opportunities for youth players.

A few hours after the announcement of the strike, Football Federation Australia released a statement condemning it, arguing that they "were presented with a fresh set of demands that amount to millions of dollars of unfunded commitments" and that the players had been "dragged into a dispute that’s primarily about the [men's] A-League". A small handful of national team players also indicated that they would be willing to break the strike, such as Lisa De Vanna, who stated that "at my age I am not sure if the opportunity to play the world champions will come up again." Most players, however, committed to the strike, with Teresa Polias stating that "we're asking for minimum wage, to sustain our lives off the pitch to do well on it. It's as simple as that."

In mid-September, it was announced that the Haiti women's national football team would replace the Matildas for the friendlies against the USWNT. Several USWNT players expressed their support for the strike, such as Abby Wambach, who stated that the Australians were "empowering themselves and they're empowering the next generation of women coming behind them to stand up and speak up for what is right and what they think that they deserve."

On 16 October, the ABC revealed that former players had previously had to go on welfare benefits to make ends meet while playing for the national team. A few days later, FFA president David Gallop told the ABC that the Federation would offer the players pay equal to minimum wage, but stated that "it’s always problematic when you talk about a minimum wage because it denotes that they’re full time contracts" and that he expected that several players would still have to find second jobs to make ends meet.

On 6 November, the PFA signed a new agreement with the FFA, resolving the strike. The new agreement included a significant pay rise, the maximum salary rising to $41,000 a year. The new agreement also included substantial increases in investment into the women's game and improved working conditions. After the agreement was struck, Hayley Raso stated that the strike was "something we had to do".

== Aftermath ==
After the resolution of the strike, PFA chair Adam Vivian stated that the union intended to try and negotiate an increase to minimum wage for domestic W-League players as well, stating that "the Matildas have a problem with that too, they want to see equity among the playing group." In 2018, the Professional Footballers Australia W-League report found that more than half of players were considering retiring early because of financial reasons.

In 2019, a new collective bargaining agreement was signed between Professional Footballers Australia and the Football Federation Australia. The new CBA guaranteed equal split of all commercial revenues between the men's and women's national teams and a number of improvements to working conditions to bring the women's standards equal to the men's, including allowing business class for international travel, increased coaching support, and better parental leave policies.

== See also ==
- U.S. women's national soccer team pay discrimination claim
- 2017 Denmark women's national football team strike
