= 2009–10 UEFA Women's Champions League knockout phase =

Tournament details
- Dates: 30 September 2009 – 20 May 2010
- Teams: 32

The 2009–10 UEFA Women's Champions League knockout phase began on 30 September 2009 and concluded on 20 May 2010 with the Coliseum Alfonso Pérez in Getafe, Spain to decide the champions of the 2009–10 UEFA Women's Champions League. A total of 32 teams competed in the knockout phase.

== Round dates ==
Phase	Round	First leg	Second leg
Knockout stage	Round of 32	30 September 2009	7 October 2009
Knockout stage	Round of 16	4 November 2009	11 November 2009
Knockout stage	Quarter-final	10 March 2010	17 March 2010
Knockout stage	Semi-final	10 April or 11 April 2010	17 April or 18 April 2010
Knockout stage	Final	20 May 2010	

== Format ==
The knockout phase involved 32 teams: 22 teams which qualified directly, and 10 teams which qualified from the qualifying round (eight group winners and two best runners-up).

Each tie in the knockout phase, apart from the final, was played over two legs, with each team playing one leg at home. The team that scored more goals on aggregate over the two legs advanced to the next round. If the aggregate score was level, the away goals rule was applied, i.e. the team that scored more goals away from home over the two legs advanced. If away goals were also equal, then 30 minutes of extra time were played. The away goals rule was again applied after extra time, i.e. if there were goals scored during extra time and the aggregate score was still level, the visiting team advanced by virtue of more away goals scored. If no goals were scored during extra time, the tie was decided by a penalty shoot-out. In the final, which was played as a single match, if scores were level at the end of normal time, extra time was played, followed by a penalty shoot-out if scores remained tied.

The mechanism of the draws for each round was as follows:

- In the draw for the round of 32, 16 teams were seeded and 16 teams were unseeded, based on their UEFA club coefficients at the beginning of the season. The seeded teams were drawn against the unseeded teams, with the seeded teams hosting the second leg. Teams from the same group or the same association could not be drawn against each other.
- In the draws for the round of 16 onwards, there were no seedings, and teams from the same group or the same association could be drawn against each other.

== Knockout phase ==
The draw for the round of 32 and round of 16 was held on 19 August 2010. The draw for the quarter-finals and onwards was made on 19 November 2010. The bracket has been created in retrospect.

=== Bracket ===
Round of 32
(Denmark) Fortuna Hjørring	4	1	5
(Italy) Bardolino	0	2	2
(Serbia) Mašinac Niš	0	0	0
(France) Lyon	1	5	6
(Poland) Unia Racibórz	1	1	2
(Austria) Neulengbach	3	0	3
(Italy) Torres	4	2	6
(Iceland) Valur	1	1	2
(Spain) Rayo Vallecano	1	1	2
(Russia) Rossiyanka	3	2	5
(Ukraine) Zhytlobud-1	0	0	0
(Sweden) Umeå	5	6	11
(Belgium) Standard Liège	0	1	1
(France) Montpellier	0	3	3
(Hungary) Viktória	0	2	2
(Germany) Bayern Munich	5	4	9
(Belarus) Universitet Vitebsk	1	3	4
(Germany) Duisburg	5	6	11
(Switzerland) Zürich	0	0	0
(Sweden) Linköping	2	3	5
(Kazakhstan) Alma	1	0	1
(Czech Republic) Sparta Prague	0	2	2
(Greece) PAOK	0	0	0
(England) Arsenal	9	9	18
(Finland) Honka	1	0	1
(Germany) Turbine Potsdam	8	8	16
(Netherlands) AZ	1	1	2
(Denmark) Brøndby	2	1	3
(Norway) Røa	3	0	3
(England) Everton	0	2	2
(Bosnia and Herzegovina) ZNK-SFK 2000	0	0	0
(Russia) Zvezda 2005 Perm	3	5	8

Round of 16
(Denmark) Fortuna Hjørring	0	0	0
(France) Lyon	1	5	6
(Austria) Neulengbach	1	1	2
(Italy) Torres	4	4	8
(Russia) Rossiyanka	0	1	1
(Sweden) Umeå	1	1	2
(France) Montpellier (a.e.t.)	0	1	1
(Germany) Bayern Munich	0	0	0
(Germany) Duisburg	1	2	3
(Sweden) Linköping	1	0	1
(Czech Republic) Sparta Prague	0	0	0
(England) Arsenal	3	2	5
(Germany) Turbine Potsdam	1	4	5
(Denmark) Brøndby	0	0	0
(Norway) Røa (a)	0	1	1
(Russia) Zvezda 2005 Perm	0	1	1

Quarter-finals
(France) Lyon	3	0	3
(Italy) Torres	0	1	1
(Sweden) Umeå (a)	0	2	2
(France) Montpellier	0	2	2
(Germany) Duisburg	2	2	4
(England) Arsenal	1	0	1
(Germany) Turbine Potsdam	5	5	10
(Norway) Røa	0	0	0

Semi-finals
(France) Lyon	3	0	3
(Sweden) Umeå	2	0	2
(Germany) Duisburg	1	0	1(1)
(Germany) Turbine Potsdam (p)	0	1	1(3)

Final
(France) Lyon	0(6)
(Germany) Turbine Potsdam (p)	0(7)

=== Round of 32 ===
The 16 seeded teams were drawn one opponent each from the pool of 16 unseeded teams. Teams from the same association could not be drawn against each other. The seeded team played the second leg at home. Matches were played on 30 September and 7 October.

Team 1	Agg.	Team 2	1st leg	2nd leg
Fortuna Hjørring (Denmark)	5–2	(Italy) Bardolino	4–0	1–2
Mašinac Niš (Serbia)	0–6	(France) Lyon	0–1	0–5
Unia Racibórz (Poland)	2–3	(Austria) Neulengbach	1–3	1–0
Torres (Italy)	6–2	(Iceland) Valur	4–1	2–1
Rayo Vallecano (Spain)	2–5	(Russia) Rossiyanka	1–3	1–2
Zhytlobud-1 Kharkiv (Ukraine)	0–11	(Sweden) Umeå	0–5	0–6
Standard Liège (Belgium)	1–3	(France) Montpellier	0–0	1–3
Viktória (Hungary)	2–9	(Germany) Bayern Munich	0–5	2–4
Universitet Vitebsk (Belarus)	4–11	(Germany) Duisburg	1–5	3–6
Zürich (Switzerland)	0–5	(Sweden) Linköping	0–2	0–3
Alma (Kazakhstan)	1–2	(Czech Republic) Sparta Prague	1–0	0–2
PAOK (Greece)	0–18	(England) Arsenal	0–9	0–9
Honka (Finland)	1–16	(Germany) Turbine Potsdam	1–8	0–8
AZ (Netherlands)	2–3	(Denmark) Brøndby	1–2	1–1
Røa (Norway)	3–2	(England) Everton	3–0	0–2
ZNK-SFK 2000 (Bosnia and Herzegovina)	0–8	(Russia) Zvezda 2005 Perm	0–3	0–5

30 September 2009
19:00 (CET)

Fortuna Hjørring (Denmark)	4–0	(Italy) Bardolino
Igbo 28'; Boni 50' (o.g.); Munk 72'; Christensen 81'	Report

Hjørring Stadium, Hjørring
Referee: Esther Staubli (Switzerland)
7 October 2009
19:30 (CET)

Bardolino (Italy)	2–1	(Denmark) Fortuna Hjørring
Paliotti 33'; Villar 77'	Report	Christensen 27'

Stadio Marcantonio Bentegodi, Verona
Referee: Gyöngyi Gaál (Hungary)

Fortuna Hjørring won 5–2 on aggregate.

30 September 2009
16:30 (CET)

Mašinac Niš (Serbia)	0–1	(France) Lyon
	Report	Simone Jatobá 6'

Mašinac Stadium, Niš
Referee: Hilal Tuba Tosun (Turkey)
7 October 2009
19:00 (CET)

Lyon (France)	5–0	(Serbia) Mašinac Niš
Necib 55', 89'; Thomis 71'; Schelin 74'; Brétigny 80'	Report

Stade de Gerland, Lyon
Referee: Efthalia Mitsi (Greece)

Lyon won 6–0 on aggregate.

30 September 2009
15:00 (CET)

Unia Racibórz (Poland)	1–3	(Austria) Neulengbach
Sznyrowska 90+2'	Report	Brandtner 12'; Ruiss 38'; Burger 51'

OSiR Stadium, Racibórz
Referee: Anja Kunick (Germany)
7 October 2009
16:00 (CET)

Neulengbach (Austria)	0–1	(Poland) Unia Racibórz
	Report	Winczo 69'

Wienerwaldstadion, Neulengbach
Referee: Claudine Brohet (Belgium)

Neulengbach won 3–2 on aggregate.

30 September 2009
15:00 (CET)

Torres (Italy)	4–1	(Iceland) Valur
Panico 40'; Manieri 45'; Tona 68'; Stracchi 80'	Report	Gísladóttir 68'

Vanni Sanna, Sassari
Referee: Floarea Babadac (Romania)
7 October 2009
17:30 (CET)

Valur (Iceland)	1–2	(Italy) Torres
Jónsdóttir 69'	Report	Iannella 42'; Panico 81'

Hlíðarendi, Reykjavík
Referee: Kateryna Monzul (Ukraine)

Torres won 6–2 on aggregate.

30 September 2009
20:30 (CET)

Rayo Vallecano (Spain)	1–3	(Russia) Rossiyanka
Martín 86'	Report	Petrova 4'; Ogbiagbevha 15'; Shmachkova 90+2'

Campo de Fútbol de Vallecas, Madrid
Referee: Christine Baitinger (Germany)
7 October 2009
13:00 (CET)

Rossiyanka (Russia)	2–1	(Spain) Rayo Vallecano
Ogbiagbevha 5'; Danilova 55'	Report	Natalia 73'

Krasnoarmeysk Stadium, Krasnoarmeysk
Referee: Tanja Schett (Austria)

Rossiyanka won 5–2 on aggregate.

30 September 2009
14:00 (CET)

Zhytlobud-1 Kharkiv (Ukraine)	0–5	(Sweden) Umeå
	Report	Jakobsson 10'; Dahlkvist 26'; Bachmann 44'; Yamaguchi 46'; Edlund 65'

Helios Arena, Kharkiv
Referee: Sabine Bonnin (France)
7 October 2009
19:00 (CET)

Umeå (Sweden)	6–0	(Ukraine) Zhytlobud-1 Kharkiv
Andrushchak 34' (o.g.); Masalska 38' (o.g.); Bachmann 45+2', 46'; Konradsson 56'; Ida Åberg Zingmark 88'	(Report)

Gammliavallen, Umeå
Referee: Alexandra Ihringova (England)

Umeå won 11–0 on aggregate.

30 September 2009
18:00 (CET)

Standard Liège (Belgium)	0–0	(France) Montpellier
	Report

Stade Maurice Dufrasne, Liège
Referee: Paloma Quintero Siles (Spain)
7 October 2009
18:00 (CET)

Montpellier (France)	3–1	(Belgium) Standard Liège
Lattaf 63'; Ramos 64'; Delie 78'	Report	Meunier 28'

La Mosson, Montpellier
Referee: Kirsi Heikkinen (Finland)

Montpellier won 3–1 on aggregate.

30 September 2009
18:00 (CET)

Viktória (Hungary)	0–5	(Germany) Bayern Munich
	Report	Bürki 9'; Baunach 17'; Islacker 31'; Rech 45+1'; Mayr 90+1'

Rohonci út, Szombathely
Referee: Laurence Zeien (Luxembourg)
7 October 2009
18:00 (CET)

Bayern Munich (Germany)	4–2	(Hungary) Viktória
Mayr 9', 60', 80'; Banecki 84'	Report	G. Tóth 12', 76'

Sportpark Aschheim, Aschheim
Referee: Natalia Avdonchenko (Russia)

Bayern Munich won 9–2 on aggregate.

30 September 2009
17:30 (CET)

Universitet Vitebsk (Belarus)	1–5	(Germany) Duisburg
Yalova 76'	Report	Hegering 6'; Maes 33'; Grings 37', 40'; Ana Leite 69'

Vitebsky Central Sport Complex, Vitebsk
Referee: Gordana Kuzmanović (Serbia)
7 October 2009
19:30 (CET)

Duisburg (Germany)	6–3	(Belarus) Universitet Vitebsk
Grings 5' (pen.), 22', 38', 45', 48'; Maes 26'	Report	Yalova 27'; Aniskovtseva 35'; Ryzhevich 52'

Niederrheinstadion, Oberhausen
Referee: Sandra Bastos (Portugal)

Duisburg won 11–4 on aggregate.

30 September 2009
18:00 (CET)

Zürich (Switzerland)	0–2	(Sweden) Linköping
	Report	Seger 15'; Landström 30'

Stadion Schützenwiese, Winterthur
Referee: Marina Mamaeva (Russia)
7 October 2009
18:00 (CET)

Linköping (Sweden)	3–0	(Switzerland) Zürich
Brännström 25'; M. J. Karlsson 37'; Andersson 60'	Report

Folkungavallen, Linköping
Referee: Bibiana Steinhaus (Germany)

Linköping won 5–0 on aggregate.

30 September 2009
11:00 (CET)

Alma (Kazakhstan)	1–0	(Czech Republic) Sparta Prague
Zhanatayeva 49'	Report

Okzhetpes Stadium, Kokshetau
Referee: Ann-Helen Østervold (Norway)
7 October 2009
15:00 (CET)

Sparta Prague (Czech Republic)	2–0	(Kazakhstan) Alma
Ondrušová 16', 37'	Report

Stadion Lokomotiva Praha, Prague
Referee: Florence Guillemin (France)

Sparta Prague won 2–1 on aggregate.

30 September 2009
18:00 (CET)

PAOK (Greece)	0–9	(England) Arsenal
	Report	Yankey 8', 72'; Little 13', 32', 35', 90+4'; Ward 44', 62'; Ludlow 87'

Toumba Stadium, Thessaloniki
Referee: Lena Arwedahl (Sweden)
7 October 2009
16:00 (CET)

Arsenal (England)	9–0	(Greece) PAOK
Little 11', 13', 47'; Chapman 17'; Beattie 21'; Kynossidou 44' (o.g.); Davison 74'; Bruton 77'; Coombs 84'	Report

Meadow Park, Borehamwood
Referee: Yuliya Medvedeva-Keldyusheva (Kazakhstan)

Arsenal won 18–0 on aggregate.

30 September 2009
18:00 (CET)

Honka (Finland)	1–8	(Germany) Turbine Potsdam
Jessi Hietanen 89'	Report	Mittag 8', 10', 60'; Zietz 14' (pen.); Helenius 16' (o.g.); Keßler 58'; Draws 71'; Tervo 90+3' (o.g.)

Tapiolan urheilupuisto, Espoo
Referee: Silvia Spinelli (Italy)
7 October 2009
19:00 (CET)

Turbine Potsdam (Germany)	8–0	(Finland) Honka
Mittag 10', 79', 90+2'; Zietz 17'; Bagehorn 40'; Odebrecht 52'; Bajramaj 64', 71'	Report

Karl-Liebknecht-Stadion, Potsdam
Referee: Jenny Palmqvist (Sweden)

Turbine Potsdam won 16–1 on aggregate.

30 September 2009
19:30 (CET)

AZ (Netherlands)	1–2	(Denmark) Brøndby
Demarteau 42'	Report	Christiansen 22'; Madsen 35'

Sportpark Schoonenberg, Velsen
Referee: Jana Adámková (Czech Republic)
7 October 2009
19:00 (CET)

Brøndby (Denmark)	1–1	(Netherlands) AZ
Christiansen 88'	Report	Røddik 9' (o.g.)

Brøndby Stadium, Brøndby
Referee: Cristina Dorcioman (Romania)

Brøndby won 3–2 on aggregate.

30 September 2009
16:30 (CET)

Røa (Norway)	3–0	(England) Everton
Thorsnes 15'; M. Knutsen 40'; Haavi 68'	Report

Røa Stadium, Oslo
Referee: Teodora Albon (Romania)
7 October 2009
16:30 (CET)

Everton (England)	2–0	(Norway) Røa
Westwood 8'; Hinnigan 57'	Report

Rossett Park, Crosby
Referee: Dagmar Damková (Czech Republic)

Røa won 3–2 on aggregate.

30 September 2009
16:00 (CET)

ZNK-SFK 2000 (Bosnia and Herzegovina)	0–3	(Russia) Zvezda 2005 Perm
	Report	Apanashchenko 9'; Tsybutovich 37'; Zinchenko 49'

Stadion Grbavica, Sarajevo
Referee: Aneliya Sinabova (Bulgaria)
7 October 2009
15:00 (CET)

Zvezda 2005 Perm (Russia)	5–0	(Bosnia and Herzegovina) ZNK-SFK 2000
Apanashchenko 8'; Kurochkina 15'; Barbashina 32'; Djatel 41'; Zinchenko 76'	Report

Zvezda Stadium, Perm
Referee: Christina Westrum Pedersen (Norway)

Zvezda 2005 Perm won 8–0 on aggregate.

=== Round of 16 ===
From this round onwards, there was no seeding, and clubs from the same association could be drawn against each other. The drawing for this round was held immediately after the drawing for the round of 32. Therefore, instead of drawing specific teams matches were drawn with the winners playing each other in this round. Matches were played on 4–5 November and 11–12 November.

Team 1	Agg.	Team 2	1st leg	2nd leg
Fortuna Hjørring (Denmark)	0–6	(France) Lyon	0–1	0–5^{1}
Neulengbach (Austria)	2–8	(Italy) Torres	1–4	1–4
Rossiyanka (Russia)	1–2	(Sweden) Umeå	0–1	1–1
Montpellier (France)	1–0	(Germany) Bayern Munich	0–0	1–0 (a.e.t.)
Duisburg (Germany)	3–1	(Sweden) Linköping	1–1	2–0
Sparta Prague (Czech Republic)	0–5	(England) Arsenal	0–3	0–2
Turbine Potsdam (Germany)	5–0	(Denmark) Brøndby	1–0	4–0
Røa (Norway)	1–1 (a)	(Russia) Zvezda 2005 Perm	0–0	1–1

- ^{1} Lyon originally won their match 5–0, but the UEFA Appeals Body awarded them a 0–3 defeat as they found Lyon guilty of fielding two ineligible players. Five weeks later, the Court of Arbitration for Sport upheld Lyon's appeal and reinstated the original result.
5 November 2009
19:00 (CET)

Fortuna Hjørring (Denmark)	0–1	(France) Lyon
	Report	Thomis 16'

Hjørring Stadium, Hjørring
Referee: Natalia Avdonchenko (Russia)
12 November 2009
18:00 (CET)

Lyon (France)	5–0	(Denmark) Fortuna Hjørring
Thomis 11'; Schelin 26', 81'; Petit 36'; Kátia 83'	Report

Stade de Gerland, Lyon
Referee: Kateryna Monzul (Ukraine)

Lyon won 6–0 on aggregate.

4 November 2009
19:00 (CET)

Neulengbach (Austria)	1–4	(Italy) Torres
Novotny 43'	Report	Iannella 12', 27', 44'; Fuselli 15'

Wienerwaldstadion, Neulengbach
Referee: Jenny Palmqvist (Sweden)
11 November 2009
14:30 (CET)

Torres (Italy)	4–1	(Austria) Neulengbach
Manieri 46'; Tona 74'; Stracchi 87'; Fuselli 90+2'	Report	Burger 67'

Vanni Sanna, Sassari
Referee: Marina Mamaeva (Russia)

Torres won 8–2 on aggregate.

4 November 2009
14:00 (CET)

Rossiyanka (Russia)	0–1	(Sweden) Umeå
	Report	Jakobsson 51'

Saturn Stadium, Ramenskoye
Referee: Dagmar Damková (Czech Republic)
11 November 2009
19:00 (CET)

Umeå (Sweden)	1–1	(Russia) Rossiyanka
Jakobsson 2'	Report	Chorna 37'

Gammliavallen, Umeå
Referee: Gyöngyi Gaál (Hungary)

Umeå won 2–1 on aggregate.

4 November 2009
18:00 (CET)

Montpellier (France)	0–0	(Germany) Bayern Munich
	Report

La Mosson, Montpellier
Referee: Floarea Babadac (Romania)
11 November 2009
19:00 (CET)

Bayern Munich (Germany)	0–1 (a.e.t.)	(France) Montpellier
	Report	Lattaf 105+2'

Sportpark Aschheim, Aschheim
Referee: Alexandra Ihringova (England)

Montpellier won 1–0 on aggregate.

4 November 2009
19:30 (CET)

Duisburg (Germany)	1–1	(Sweden) Linköping
Laudehr 86'	Report	Asllani 30'

Niederrheinstadion, Oberhausen
Referee: Claudine Brohet (Belgium)
11 November 2009
19:00 (CET)

Linköping (Sweden)	0–2	(Germany) Duisburg
	Report	Popp 59'; Grings 90+3'

Nya Parken, Norrköping
Referee: Cristina Dorcioman (Romania)

Duisburg won 3–1 on aggregate.

4 November 2009
18:00 (CET)

Sparta Prague (Czech Republic)	0–3	(England) Arsenal
	Report	Flaherty 11'; Grant 27'; Little 55' (pen.)

Stadion Letná, Prague
Referee: Christine Baitinger (Germany)
11 November 2009
14:30 (CET)

Arsenal (England)	2–0	(Czech Republic) Sparta Prague
Heroldová 31' (o.g.); Little 56'	Report

Meadow Park, Borehamwood
Referee: Efthalia Mitsi (Greece)

Arsenal won 5–0 on aggregate.

4 November 2009
19:00 (CET)

Turbine Potsdam (Germany)	1–0	(Denmark) Brøndby
Bajramaj 17'	Report

Karl-Liebknecht-Stadion, Potsdam
Referee: Tanja Schett (Austria)
11 November 2009
19:00 (CET)

Brøndby (Denmark)	0–4	(Germany) Turbine Potsdam
	Report	Keßler 6', 88'; Wich 65'; Mittag 66'

Brøndby Stadium, Brøndby
Referee: Kirsi Heikkinen (Finland)

Turbine Potsdam won 5–0 on aggregate.

4 November 2009
14:00 (CET)

Røa (Norway)	0–0	(Russia) Zvezda 2005 Perm
	Report

Roa Stadium, Oslo
Referee: Esther Staubli (Switzerland)
11 November 2009
15:00 (CET)

Zvezda 2005 Perm (Russia)	1–1	(Norway) Røa
Barbashina 61'	Report	G. Knutsen 2'

Zvezda Stadium, Perm
Referee: Bibiana Steinhaus (Germany)

1–1 on aggregate. Røa won on away goals.

=== Quarter-finals ===
Matches were played on 10 March and 14–17 March.

Team 1	Agg.	Team 2	1st leg	2nd leg
Lyon (France)	3–1	(Italy) Torres	3–0	0–1
Umeå (Sweden)	2–2 (a)	(France) Montpellier	0–0	2–2
Duisburg (Germany)	4–1	(England) Arsenal	2–1	2–0
Turbine Potsdam (Germany)	10–0	(Norway) Røa	5–0	5–0

10 March 2010
17:30 (CET)

Lyon (France)	3–0	(Italy) Torres
Cruz Traña 19'; Schelin 30', 62'	Report

Stade de Gerland, Lyon
Attendance: 1,107
Referee: Claudine Brohet (Belgium)
17 March 2010
15:00 (CET)

Torres (Italy)	1–0	(France) Lyon
Cruz Traña 18' (o.g.)	Report

Vanni Sanna, Sassari
Attendance: 480
Referee: Bibiana Steinhaus (Germany)

Lyon won 3–1 on aggregate.

10 March 2010
19:00 (CET)

Umeå (Sweden)	0–0	(France) Montpellier
	Report

Gammliavallen, Umeå
Attendance: 836
Referee: Teodora Albon (Romania)
17 March 2010
19:00 (CET)

Montpellier (France)	2–2	(Sweden) Umeå
Diguelman 54'; Plaza 76'	Report	Åberg Zingmark 86'; Jakobsson 90'

La Mosson, Montpellier
Attendance: 5,020
Referee: Tanja Schett (Austria)

2–2 on aggregate. Umeå won on away goals.

10 March 2010
19:30 (CET)

Duisburg (Germany)	2–1	(England) Arsenal
Grings 24' (pen.); Hegering 49'	Report	Grings 66' (o.g.)

MSV-Arena, Duisburg
Attendance: 5,145
Referee: Jenny Palmqvist (Sweden)
14 March 2010
14:00 (CET)

Arsenal (England)	0–2	(Germany) Duisburg
	Report	Oster 49'; Himmighofen 88'

Woodside Park, Bishop's Stortford
Attendance: 724
Referee: Kirsi Heikkinen (Finland)

Duisburg won 4–1 on aggregate.

10 March 2010
19:00 (CET)

Turbine Potsdam (Germany)	5–0	(Norway) Røa
Keßler 20', 69'; Odebrecht 43'; Peter 49'; Nagasato 80'	Report

Karl-Liebknecht-Stadion, Potsdam
Attendance: 1,496
Referee: Kateryna Monzul (Ukraine)
17 March 2010
15:30 (CET)

Røa (Norway)	0–5	(Germany) Turbine Potsdam
	Report	Mittag 30', 63'; Bajramaj 56'; Nagasato 73'; Wich 82'

Roa Stadium, Oslo
Attendance: 285
Referee: Alexandra Ihringova (England)

Turbine Potsdam won 10–0 on aggregate.

=== Semi-finals ===
Matches were played on 10–11 April and 17–18 April 2010.

Team 1	Agg.	Team 2	1st leg	2nd leg
Lyon (France)	3–2	(Sweden) Umeå	3–2	0–0
Duisburg (Germany)	1–1 (1–3 p)	(Germany) Turbine Potsdam	1–0	0–1 (a.e.t.)

10 April 2010
17:00 (CEST)

Lyon (France)	3–2	(Sweden) Umeå
Necib 3', 42'; Kátia 83'	Report	Pettersson 19', 71'

Stade de Gerland, Lyon
Attendance: 4,636
Referee: Christine Beck (Germany)
28 April 2010
20:00 (CEST)

Umeå (Sweden)	0–0	(France) Lyon
	Report

Gammliavallen, Umeå
Attendance: 1,526
Referee: Cristina Dorcioman (Romania)

Lyon won 3–2 on aggregate.

11 April 2010
14:00 (CEST)

Duisburg (Germany)	1–0	(Germany) Turbine Potsdam
Maes 28'	Report

PCC-Stadion, Duisburg
Attendance: 2,150
Referee: Dagmar Damková (Czech Republic)
18 April 2010
14:00 (CEST)

Turbine Potsdam (Germany)	1–0 (a.e.t.)	(Germany) Duisburg
Kemme 62'	Report
Penalties
Zietz (penalty scored); Mittag (penalty scored); Peter (penalty scored); Bajramaj (penalty missed)	3–1	(penalty missed) Grings; (penalty missed) Bresonik; (penalty scored) Wermelt; (penalty missed) Ioannidou

Karl-Liebknecht-Stadion, Potsdam
Attendance: 4,522
Referee: Gyöngyi Gaál (Hungary)

1–1 on aggregate. Turbine Potsdam won 3–1 on penalties.

== Final ==
20 May 2010
20:30 (CEST)

Lyon (France)	0–0 (a.e.t.)	(Germany) Turbine Potsdam
	Report
Penalties
Franco (penalty scored); Dickenmann (penalty scored); Kaci (penalty scored); Henry (penalty missed); Herlovsen (penalty missed); Renard (penalty scored); Simone (penalty scored); Bouhaddi (penalty scored); Thomis (penalty missed)	6–7	(penalty missed) Zietz; (penalty scored) Peter; (penalty scored) Odebrecht; (penalty missed) Mittag; (penalty scored) Kerschowski; (penalty scored) Nagasato; (penalty scored) Bajramaj; (penalty scored) Sarholz; (penalty scored) Schmidt

Coliseum Alfonso Pérez, Getafe
Attendance: 10,372
Referee: Kirsi Heikkinen (Finland)

UEFA Women's Champions League
2009–10 winners

Second title

== Top goalscorers ==
The top goal scorers including qualifying rounds were:

Rank	Player	Team	Goals
1	(Switzerland) Vanessa Bürki	Bayern Munich	11
2	(Sweden) Ida Brännström	Linköping	10
3	(Germany) Inka Grings	Duisburg	9
3	(Scotland) Kim Little	Arsenal	9
3	(Germany) Anja Mittag	Turbine Potsdam	9
