= 2009–10 UEFA Women's Champions League qualifying round =

Tournament details
- Dates: 5–10 August 2009
- Teams: 28

The 2009–10 UEFA Women's Champions League qualifying round was played on 30 July, 1 and 4 August 2009. A total of 28 teams competed in the qualifying round to decide 9 of the 32 places in the knockout phase of the 2009–10 UEFA Women's Champions League.

The draw was made on 24 June 2009. Teams marked (H) hosted a mini-league. The winners of each group qualified for the next round.

== Groups ==
=== Group A ===
Matches were played at City Stadium, Šiauliai and at the Aukštaitija Stadium, Panevėžys.

Pos	Team	Pld	W	D	L	GF	GA	GD	Pts	Qualification	BAY	GLA	GIN	NDI
1	(Germany) Bayern Munich	3	3	0	0	32	2	+30	9	Advance to main round	—	5–2	–	19–0
2	(Scotland) Glasgow City	3	2	0	1	13	5	+8	6		–	—	2–0	–
3	(Lithuania) Gintra Universitetas (H)	3	1	0	2	7	11	−4	3		0–8	–	—	7–1
4	(Georgia (country)) Norchi Dinamoeli	3	0	0	3	1	35	−34	0		–	0–9	–	—

Source: RSSSF
(H) Hosts
30 July 2009
13:00 (CET)

Bayern Munich (Germany)	5–2	(Scotland) Glasgow City
Würmseer 16'; Simic 32', 78'; Aigner 84'; Banecki 90'	Report	J. Ross 50'; Littlejohn 77'

Savivaldybė Stadium, Šiauliai
Referee: Esther Staubli (Switzerland)
30 July 2009
17:00 (CET)

Gintra Universitetas (Lithuania)	7–1	(Georgia (country)) Norchi Dinamoeli
Alekperova 9', 61' (pen.); Imanalijeva 22'; Komarova 30', 45'; Budrytė 58'; Bložytė 73'	Report	Kvaliashvili 90+3'

Savivaldybė Stadium, Šiauliai
Referee: Betina Norman (Denmark)

1 August 2009
13:00 (CET)

Bayern Munich (Germany)	19–0	(Georgia (country)) Norchi Dinamoeli
Würmseer 13', 28', 70', 77', 88'; Simic 17', 20', 34', 45+4'; Skhirtladze 18' (o.g.); Behringer 41' (pen.), 73'; Bürki 43', 46', 68', 72' (pen.), 84', 90'; Rech 45'	Report

Savivaldybė Stadium, Šiauliai
Referee: Betina Norman (Denmark)
1 August 2009
17:00 (CET)

Glasgow City (Scotland)	2–0	(Lithuania) Gintra Universitetas
Littlejohn 50'; J. Ross 75'	Report

Savivaldybė Stadium, Šiauliai
Referee: Mihaela Gurdon Bašimamović (Croatia)

4 August 2009
15:00 (CET)

Gintra Universitetas (Lithuania)	0–8	(Germany) Bayern Munich
	Report	de Pol 34'; Simic 44'; Bürki 48', 57', 68', 90'; Würmseer 65'; 8Mirlach 90+3'

Savivaldybė Stadium, Šiauliai
Referee: Mihaela Gurdon Bašimamović (Croatia)
4 August 2009
15:00 (CET)

Norchi Dinamoeli (Georgia (country))	0–9	(Scotland) Glasgow City
	Report	Lappin 8'; Malone 10', 19', 40', 46'; L. Ross 14'; Lindner 33'; Littlejohn 34'; Sneddon 67'

Aukštaitija Stadium, Panevėžys
Referee: Esther Staubli (Switzerland)

=== Group B ===
Matches were played at Mladost Stadium, Strumica and Kukuš Stadium, Turnovo.

Pos	Team	Pld	W	D	L	GF	GA	GD	Pts	Qualification	MH	NSA	KIK	TIK
1	(France) Montpellier	3	3	0	0	12	1	+11	9	Advance to main round	—	–	2–0	7–1
2	(Bulgaria) NSA Sofia	3	2	0	1	7	4	+3	6		0–3	—	–	5–0
3	(Faroe Islands) KÍ Klaksvík	3	1	0	2	5	6	−1	3		–	1–2	—	–
4	(North Macedonia) Tikvesanka (H)	3	0	0	3	3	16	−13	0		–	–	2–4	—

Source: RSSSF
(H) Hosts
30 July 2009
17:00 (CET)

Montpellier (France)	2–0	(Faroe Islands) KÍ Klaksvík
Ramos 51', 69' (pen.)	Report

Mladost Stadium, Strumica
Referee: Silvia Spinelli (Italy)
30 July 2009
17:00 (CET)

NSA Sofia (Bulgaria)	5–0	(North Macedonia) Tikvesanka
Radoyska 7'; Gospodinova 27', 69'; Kovacheva 57'; Zhekova 66'	Report

Kukuš Stadium, Turnovo
Referee: Marina Mamaeva (Russia)

1 August 2009
18:00 (CET)

Montpellier (France)	7–1	(North Macedonia) Tikvesanka
Parasme 18', 35'; Viguier 20'; Lozé 61' (pen.); Delie 67', 70'; Diguelman 71'	Report	Andonova 83'

Mladost Stadium, Strumica
Referee: Petra Pavlikova (Slovakia)
1 August 2009
18:00 (CET)

KÍ Klaksvík (Faroe Islands)	1–2	(Bulgaria) NSA Sofia
Andreasen 28'	Report	Radoyska 33'; Boyanova 81'

Kukuš Stadium, Turnovo
Referee: Silvia Spinelli (Italy)

4 August 2009
18:00 (CET)

NSA Sofia (Bulgaria)	0–3	(France) Montpellier
	Report	Delie 26'; Ramos 30'; Lattaf 57' (pen.)

Mladost Stadium, Strumica
Referee: Marina Mamaeva (Russia)
4 August 2009
18:00 (CET)

Tikvesanka (North Macedonia)	2–4	(Faroe Islands) KÍ Klaksvík
Andreevska 56'; Koshuleva 64'	Report	Andreasen 4', 23'; Purkhús 30'; Josephsen 74'

Kukuš Stadium, Turnovo
Referee: Petra Pavlikova (Slovakia)

=== Group C ===
Matches were played at Brøndby IF's bane 2 and Brøndby Stadium.

Pos	Team	Pld	W	D	L	GF	GA	GD	Pts	Qualification	BRØ	DEZ	CAR	BIR
1	(Denmark) Brøndby (H)	3	3	0	0	12	0	+12	9	Advance to main round	—	–	5–0	6–0
2	(Portugal) 1° Dezembro	3	2	0	1	13	1	+12	6		0–1	—	–	10–0
3	(Wales) Cardiff City	3	1	0	2	10	9	+1	3		–	0–3	—	–
4	(Malta) Birkirkara	3	0	0	3	1	26	−25	0		–	–	1–10	—

Source: RSSSF
(H) Hosts
30 July 2009
15:00 (CET)

1° Dezembro (Portugal)	10–0	(Malta) Birkirkara
Couto 17'; Fernandes 18', 26'; Silva 39', 87'; Silvia 54'; Pace 61' (o.g.); Matias 64'; Galvão 69'; Fenech 90+2' (o.g.)	Report

Brøndby Stadium bane 2, Brøndby
Referee: Gordana Kuzmanović (Serbia)
30 July 2009
18:30 (CET)

Brøndby (Denmark)	5–0	(Wales) Cardiff City
Troelsgaard 11'; Brogaard 17'; Madsen 21'; D. Larsen 54'; Nielsen 21'	Report

Brøndby Stadium bane 2, Brøndby
Referee: Katalin Kulcsár (Hungary)

1 August 2009
13:00 (CET)

Cardiff City (Wales)	0–3	(Portugal) 1° Dezembro
	Report	Mendes 10'; Fernandes 33'; Galvão 78'

Brøndby Stadium bane 2, Brøndby
Referee: Katalin Kulcsár (Hungary)
1 August 2009
16:30 (CET)

Brøndby (Denmark)	6–0	(Malta) Birkirkara
Andersen 38'; N. Larsen 45'; Kragh 65', 73'; Christiansen 80'; Røddik 89'	Report

Brøndby Stadium bane 2, Brøndby
Referee: Knarik Grigoryan (Armenia)

4 August 2009
12:45 (CET)

Birkirkara (Malta)	1–10	(Wales) Cardiff City
Cuschieri 55'	Report	Harding 5', 18', 22', 31', 32'; Miller 6'; Wilcox 11'; Barrow 40'; Cousins 45+2', 82'

Brøndby Stadium bane 2, Brøndby
Referee: Knarik Grigoryan (Armenia)
4 August 2009
15:00 (CET)

1° Dezembro (Portugal)	0–1	(Denmark) Brøndby
	Report	Andersen 31'

Brøndby Stadium, Brøndby
Referee: Gordana Kuzmanović (Serbia)

=== Group D ===
Matches were played at Matija Gubec Stadium, Krško and Ivančna Gorica Stadium, Ivančna Gorica.

Pos	Team	Pld	W	D	L	GF	GA	GD	Pts	Qualification	TOR	SDŠ	TRA	KRK
1	(Italy) Torres	3	3	0	0	13	0	+13	9	Advance to main round	—	1–0	9–0	–
2	(Slovakia) Slovan Duslo Šaľa	3	1	1	1	4	4	0	4		–	—	–	2–2
3	(Turkey) Trabzonspor	3	1	0	2	3	11	−8	3		–	1–2	—	–
4	(Slovenia) ŽNK Krka (H)	3	0	1	2	2	7	−5	1		0–3	–	0–2	—

Source: RSSSF
(H) Hosts
30 July 2009
15:45 (CET)

Torres (Italy)	1–0	(Slovakia) Slovan Duslo Šaľa
Panico 88'	Report

Matija Gubec Stadium, Krško
Referee: Laurence Zeien (Luxembourg)
30 July 2009
20:45 (CET)

ŽNK Krka (Slovenia)	0–2	(Turkey) Trabzonspor
	Report	Tchkonia 33'; Önder 45'

Matija Gubec Stadium, Krško
Referee: Karolina Radzik-Johan (Poland)

1 August 2009
15:45 (CET)

Torres (Italy)	9–0	(Turkey) Trabzonspor
Panico 4', 34'; Fuselli 16', 58'; Manieri 43'; Cortesi 50'; Tona 52', 80'; Mattu 90'	Report

Matija Gubec Stadium, Krško
Referee: Laurence Zeien (Luxembourg)
1 August 2009
20:45 (CET)

Slovan Duslo Šaľa (Slovakia)	2–2	(Slovenia) ŽNK Krka
Kolenová 15'; Šaraboková 31'	Report	Benak 40'; Erman 49'

Matija Gubec Stadium, Krško
Referee: Karolina Radzik-Johan (Poland)

4 August 2009
17:30 (CET)

ŽNK Krka (Slovenia)	0–3	(Italy) Torres
	Report	Fuselli 59'; Stracchi 66'; Iannella 82'

Matija Gubec Stadium, Krško
Referee: Christina Pedersen (Norway)
4 August 2009
17:30 (CET)

Trabzonspor (Turkey)	1–2	(Slovakia) Slovan Duslo Šaľa
Kalyoncu 54'	Report	Šaraboková 9'; Bojdová 39'

Ivančna Gorica Stadium, Ivančna Gorica
Referee: Karolina Radzik-Johan (Poland)

=== Group E ===
Matches were played at Folkungavallen, Linköping.

Pos	Team	Pld	W	D	L	GF	GA	GD	Pts	Qualification	LIN	CLU	GLE	RCA
1	(Sweden) Linköping (H)	3	3	0	0	20	0	+20	9	Advance to main round	—	–	3–0	11–0
2	(Romania) CFF Clujana	3	2	0	1	10	6	+4	6		0–6	—	1–0	–
3	(Northern Ireland) Glentoran	3	1	0	2	2	4	−2	3		–	–	—	2–0
4	(Moldova) Roma Calfa	3	0	0	3	0	22	−22	0		–	0–9	–	—

Source: RSSSF
(H) Hosts
30 July 2009
12:00 (CET)

CFF Clujana (Romania)	1–0	(Northern Ireland) Glentoran
Dușa 89'	Report

Folkungavallen, Linköping
Referee: Zuzana Kováčová (Slovakia)
30 July 2009
17:00 (CET)

Linköping (Sweden)	11–0	(Moldova) Roma Calfa
Brännström 14', 21', 50', 66', 85'; Skålberg 25'; Sharro 28'; Seger 41' (pen.); Krantz 44'; Asllani 57'; M. Karlsson 89'	Report

Folkungavallen, Linköping
Referee: Leen Martens (Belgium)

1 August 2009
12:00 (CET)

Roma Calfa (Moldova)	0–9	(Romania) CFF Clujana
	Report	Dușa 3', 15', 59', 79'; Olar 11', 13', 76', 88'; Cusinova 78' (o.g.)

Folkungavallen, Linköping
Referee: Leen Martens (Belgium)
1 August 2009
17:00 (CET)

Linköping (Sweden)	3–0	(Northern Ireland) Glentoran
Brännström 56'; Asllani 80'; M. J. Karlsson 90+1'	Report

Folkungavallen, Linköping
Referee: Dilan Gökçek (Turkey)

4 August 2009
12:00 (CET)

Glentoran (Northern Ireland)	2–0	(Moldova) Roma Calfa
Cory 77'; Kevorkian 80'	Report

Folkungavallen, Linköping
Referee: Dilan Gökçek (Turkey)
4 August 2009
17:00 (CET)

CFF Clujana (Romania)	0–6	(Sweden) Linköping
	Report	Asllani 8'; Landström 25'; Brännström 45', 53', 74'; Sharro 62'

Folkungavallen, Linköping
Referee: Zuzana Kováčová (Slovakia)

=== Group F ===
Matches were played at Tsirion Stadium, Limassol and Pafiako Stadium, Paphos.

Pos	Team	Pld	W	D	L	GF	GA	GD	Pts	Qualification	ROS	APL	MHO	SFR
1	(Russia) Rossiyanka	3	3	0	0	19	0	+19	9	Advance to main round	—	1–0	–	11–0
2	(Cyprus) Apollon Limassol (H)	3	2	0	1	6	1	+5	6		–	—	–	2–0
3	(Israel) Maccabi Holon	3	1	0	2	2	11	−9	3		0–7	0–4	—	–
4	(Republic of Ireland) St Francis	3	0	0	3	0	15	−15	0		–	–	0–2	—

Source: RSSSF
(H) Hosts
30 July 2009
17:00 (CET)

Rossiyanka (Russia)	11–0	(Republic of Ireland) St Francis
Morozova 8'; Skotnikova 11'; Petrova 20'; Ogbiagbevha 23', 30', 31'; Pekur 35'; Danilova 66', 70', 77', 84'	Report

Tsirion Stadium, Limassol
Referee: Esther Azzopardi (Malta)
30 July 2009
20:00 (CET)

Maccabi Holon (Israel)	0–4	(Cyprus) Apollon Limassol
	Report	Laiu 3', 57'; Iuşan 44'; Solomou 45+2'

Tsirion Stadium, Limassol
Referee: Paloma Quintero Siles (Spain)

1 August 2009
17:00 (CET)

Rossiyanka (Russia)	1–0	(Cyprus) Apollon Limassol
Ogbiagbevha 14'	Report

Tsirion Stadium, Limassol
Referee: Paula Thörn (Sweden)
1 August 2009
20:00 (CET)

St Francis (Republic of Ireland)	0–2	(Israel) Maccabi Holon
	Report	Ohana 17', 61'

Tsirion Stadium, Limassol
Referee: Esther Azzopardi (Malta)

4 August 2009
16:45 (CET)

Maccabi Holon (Israel)	0–7	(Russia) Rossiyanka
	Report	Danilova 20', 67'; Petrova 36'; Levykina 42'; Terekhova 53'; Ogbiagbevha 75'; Shlyapina 90+1'

Pafiako Stadium, Paphos
Referee: Paloma Quintero Siles (Spain)
4 August 2009
16:45 (CET)

Apollon Limassol (Cyprus)	2–0	(Republic of Ireland) St Francis
Kostova 49'; Laiu 71'	Report

Tsirion Stadium, Limassol
Referee: Paula Thörn (Sweden)

=== Group G ===
Matches were played at Gradski vrt, Osijek and Stadion Cibalia, Vinkovci.

Pos	Team	Pld	W	D	L	GF	GA	GD	Pts	Qualification	EVE	STR	LTA	OSI
1	(England) Everton	3	3	0	0	11	1	+10	9	Advance to main round	—	–	7–0	3–1
2	(Norway) Team Strømmen	3	2	0	1	14	1	+13	6		0–1	—	5–0	–
3	(Estonia) Levadia Tallinn	3	1	0	2	4	13	−9	3		–	–	—	–
4	(Croatia) Osijek (H)	3	0	0	3	2	16	−14	0		–	0–9	4–1	—

Source: RSSSF
(H) Hosts
30 July 2009
17:00 (CET)

Everton (England)	3–1	(Croatia) Osijek
Duggan 55'; Zlosa 60' (o.g.); Williams 75'	Report	Juko 6'

Gradski vrt, Osijek
Referee: Christine Baitinger (Germany)
30 July 2009
20:00 (CET)

Team Strømmen (Norway)	5–0	(Estonia) Levadia Tallinn
Dekkerhus 5', 84'; Abdullah 24'; Nwajei 77', 90+3'	Report

Gradski vrt, Osijek
Referee: Natalia Aleksakhina (Ukraine)

1 August 2009
17:00 (CET)

Everton (England)	7–0	(Estonia) Levadia Tallinn
Scott 14', 25', 67'; Williams 37'; Dowie 53', 65'; Westwood 78'	Report

Gradski vrt, Osijek
Referee: Natalia Aleksakhina (Ukraine)
1 August 2009
20:00 (CET)

Osijek (Croatia)	0–9	(Norway) Team Strømmen
	Report	Dekkerhus 8', 74'; Nwajei 16', 59'; Matheson 41'; Knudsen 43', 88'; Storløkken 49'; Gulbrandsen 80'

Gradski vrt, Osijek
Referee: Jana Adámková (Czech Republic)

4 August 2009
17:00 (CET)

Team Strømmen (Norway)	0–1	(England) Everton
	Report	Hinnigan 90+2'

Stadion Cibalia, Vinkovci
Referee: Christine Baitinger (Germany)
4 August 2009
17:00 (CET)

Osijek (Croatia)	4–1	(Estonia) Levadia Tallinn
Ahmetšina 23'; Pajo 45+2', 63' (pen.), 72'	Report	Pavlek 58'

Gradski vrt, Osijek
Referee: Jana Adámková (Czech Republic)
