= Marie-Louise Eta =

German football manager (born 1991)

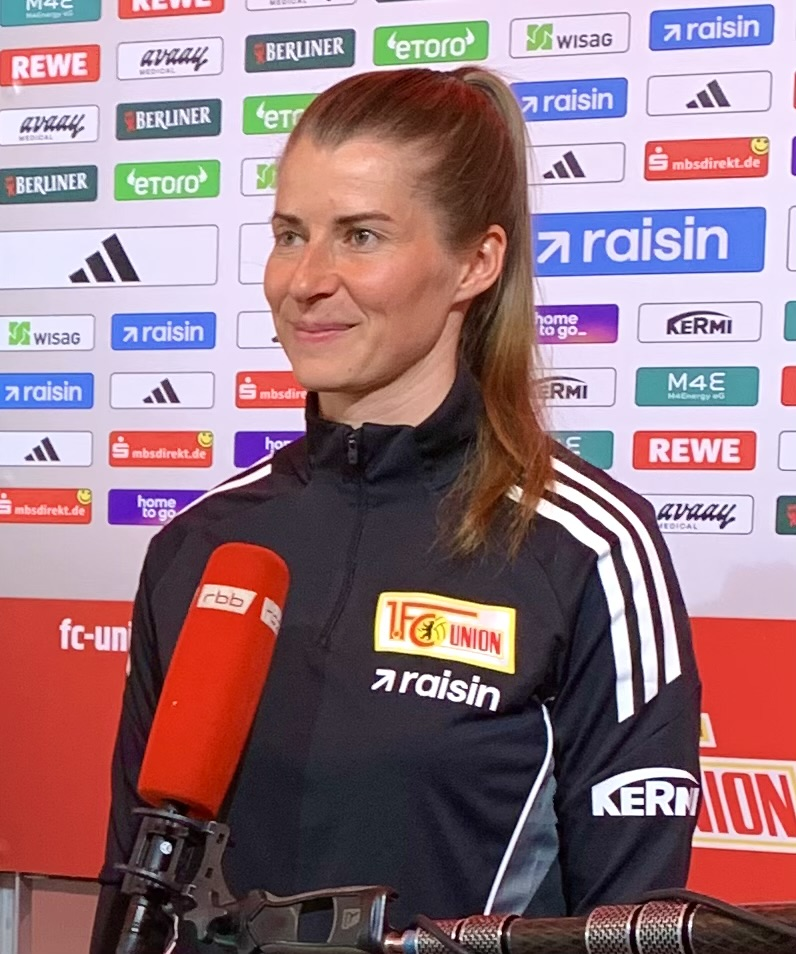
- Eta in 2026

Personal information
- Full name: Marie-Louise Eta
- Birth name: Marie-Louise Bagehorn
- Date of birth: 7 July 1991 (age 35)
- Place of birth: Dresden, Germany
- Height: 1.65 m (5 ft 5 in)
- Position: Midfielder

Team information
- Current team: Union Berlin (women) (manager)

Youth career
- 1997–2002: FV Dresden 06
- 2002–2005: 1. FFC Fortuna Dresden
- 2006–2007: 1. FFC Turbine Potsdam

Senior career*
Years	Team	Apps	(Gls)
2007–2011	1. FFC Turbine Potsdam II	20	(4)
2008–2011	1. FFC Turbine Potsdam	29	(3)
2011–2012	Hamburger SV	22	(2)
2012–2014	BV Cloppenburg	41	(6)
2014–2018	Werder Bremen	84	(19)
Total		196	(32)

International career
2006	Germany U15	5	(2)
2006	Germany U16	1	(0)
2007–2008	Germany U17	17	(1)
2009–2010	Germany U19	22	(4)
2010	Germany U20	3	(0)
2010–2012	Germany U23	2	(0)

Managerial career
- 2025–2026: Union Berlin U19
- 2026: Union Berlin (interim)
- 2026–: Union Berlin (women)
- * Club domestic league appearances and goals

Marie-Louise Eta (née Bagehorn; born 7 July 1991) is a German professional football manager and former player who is the manager of Frauen-Bundesliga club Union Berlin. A former midfielder, she played for clubs 1. FFC Turbine Potsdam and Werder Bremen, among other teams.

From March 2026 to the end of the season, she served as the interim head coach of men's Bundesliga club Union Berlin. With this, she became the first and only woman in charge of a men's team in the top five European football leagues. Previously, in 2023, she also became the first female assistant coach in the history of the men's Bundesliga and the men's UEFA Champions League.

== Club career ==
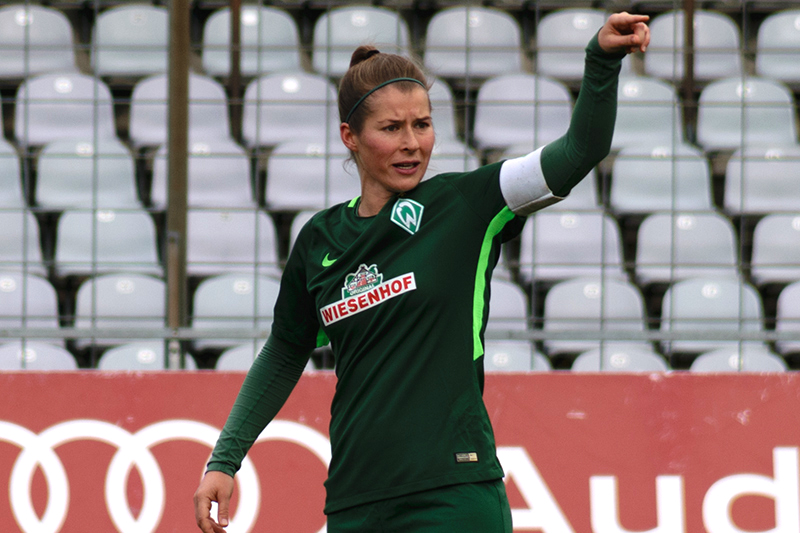
Eta in 2017

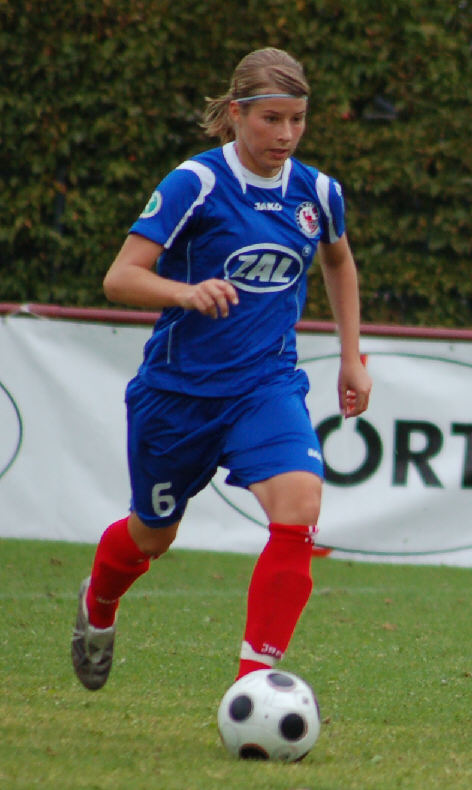
Eta in 2009

On 1 July 2011, Eta transferred to Hamburger SV, where she was initially supposed to play for the first team for two years. After HSV withdrew from the Frauen-Bundesliga, she joined 2. Frauen-Bundesliga club BV Cloppenburg on 12 June 2012. Cloppenburg won the North division and were promoted to the Bundesliga in 2013. Eta made her debut for BV Cloppenburg in the Bundesliga on 8 September 2013 (matchday 1) in a 3–3 draw away against SGS Essen. Cloppenburg finished second-to-last in the table and were relegated from the Bundesliga after just one season. Eta left the club and announced her transfer to 2. Bundesliga side Werder Bremen in July 2014.

Eta retired from playing at the end of the 2017–18 season, aged 26.

== International career ==
As an Germany under-19 international, she played at the 2009 and 2010 UEFA Under-19 European Championships.

== Coaching career ==
In 2023, after being appointed assistant coach to Marco Grote at Union Berlin, Eta became the first woman to serve in this role with a men's Bundesliga side, and with a team in the men's UEFA Champions League.

In 2024, Eta became the first woman to take charge of a men's team in a Bundesliga game, upon temporarily replacing Union Berlin's head coach Nenad Bjelica, who was serving a three-game ban.

On 11 April 2026, after Union Berlin sacked Steffen Baumgart after only two wins in the last 14 games, Eta was appointed as the interim head coach, which made her the first ever woman to manage a team in the Bundesliga and the top five European football leagues. The appointment was met with sexist abuse on social media aimed at Eta, who was defended by the club.

A month later, on 10 May, Eta became the first female head coach ever to win a match across Europe's top 5 leagues following Union Berlin's 3–1 away victory over Mainz. She had another victory, defeating FC Augsburg 4–0. Concluding her five-match tenure with two wins, two losses and one draw.

As it was already agreed on before her stint with the men's team, she took over the role of head coach of Union's women's side with the start of the 2026/27 season.

== Personal life ==
She married Benjamin Eta in 2014. He had represented her as a player agent from 2012.

== Playing statistics ==
Appearances and goals by club, season and competition
Club	Season	League			DFB-Pokal		Bundesliga cup		Continental		Total	
Club	Season	Division	Apps	Goals	Apps	Goals	Apps	Goals	Apps	Goals	Apps	Goals
Turbine Potsdam	2008–09	Bundesliga	18	1	3	0	—		—		21	1
Turbine Potsdam	2009–10	Bundesliga	9	2	2	1	—		2	1	13	4
Turbine Potsdam	2010–11	Bundesliga	2	0	1	1	6	0	—		9	1
Turbine Potsdam	Total		29	3	6	2	6	0	2	1	43	6
Hamburger SV	2011–12	Bundesliga	22	2	4	3	—		—		26	5
BV Cloppenburg	2012–13	2. Bundesliga	22	4	3	1	—		—		25	5
BV Cloppenburg	2013–14	Bundesliga	19	2	3	1	—		—		22	3
BV Cloppenburg	Total		41	6	6	2	0	0	0	0	47	8
Werder Bremen	2014–15	2. Bundesliga	20	6	2	0	—		—		22	6
Werder Bremen	2015–16	Bundesliga	22	2	4	1	—		—		26	3
Werder Bremen	2016–17	2. Bundesliga	22	8	3	0	—		—		25	8
Werder Bremen	2017–18	Bundesliga	20	3	3	0	—		—		23	3
Werder Bremen	Total		84	19	12	1	0	0	0	0	96	20
Career total			176	30	28	8	6	0	2	1	212	39

== Managerial statistics ==
As of 10 November 2026

Team	From	To	Record					Ref.
Team	From	To	P	W	D	L	Win %	Ref.
Union Berlin U19	1 July 2025	11 April 2026	22	13	4	5	59.1	
Union Berlin	12 April 2026	20 May 2026	5	2	1	2	40.0	
Union Berlin (women)	22 May 2026	present	9	3	2	4	33.3	
Total			36	18	7	11	50.0	

== Honours ==
=== Player ===
Turbine Potsdam

- UEFA Champions League: 2009–10
- Bundesliga: 2008–09, 2009–10, 2010–11
- DFB-Hallenpokal: 2009, 2010

BV Cloppenburg

- 2. Bundesliga: 2012–13

Werder Bremen

- 2. Bundesliga: 2016–17
