= Lisa Schmitz =

German footballer

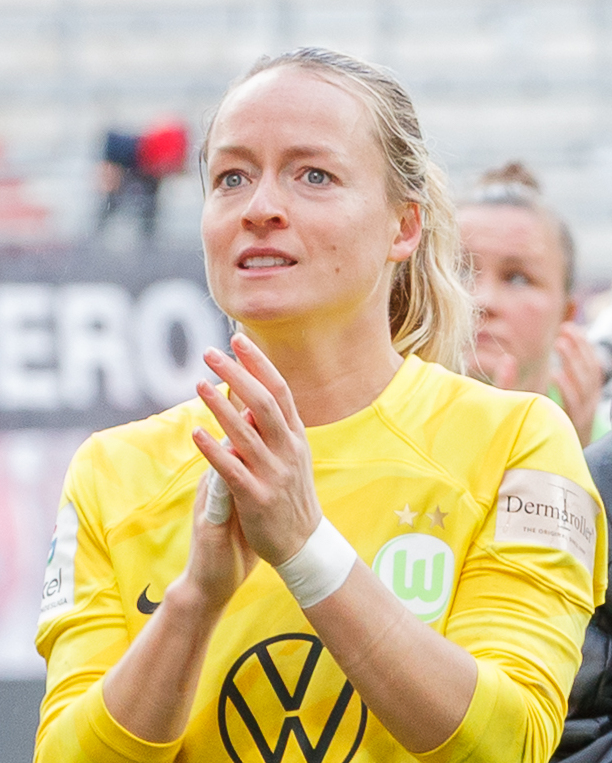
- Schmitz with VfL Wolfsburg in 2023

Personal information
- Full name: Lisa Schmitz
- Date of birth: 4 May 1992 (age 34)
- Place of birth: Cologne, Germany
- Height: 1.72 m (5 ft 8 in)
- Position: Goalkeeper

Team information
- Current team: 1. FC Köln
- Number: 1

Youth career
- 2007–2008: Germania Zündorf

Senior career*
| Years | Team | Apps | (Gls) |
| 2008–2015 | Bayer Leverkusen | 121 | (0) |
| 2015–2019 | Turbine Potsdam | 69 | (0) |
| 2019–2023 | Montpellier | 58 | (0) |
| 2023–2025 | VfL Wolfsburg | 4 | (0) |
| 2025– | 1. FC Köln | 18 | (0) |

International career
| 2007 | Germany U15 | 3 | (0) |
| 2007 | Germany U16 | 1 | (0) |
| 2007–2009 | Germany U17 | 6 | (0) |
| 2009–2011 | Germany U19 | 10 | (0) |
| 2018 | Germany | 2 | (0) |
Medal record
Women's football
Representing Germany
UEFA Women's Under-19 Championship
| Winner | 2011 Italy |
FIFA U-17 Women's World Cup
| Bronze medal – third place | 2008 New Zealand |
UEFA Women's Under-17 Championship
| Winner | 2008 Switzerland |
- * Club domestic league appearances and goals as of 21 November 2026

Lisa Schmitz (born 4 May 1992) is a German professional footballer who plays as a goalkeeper for Frauen-Bundesliga club 1. FC Köln. She has also played for the German national team in international friendly matches.

== Club career ==
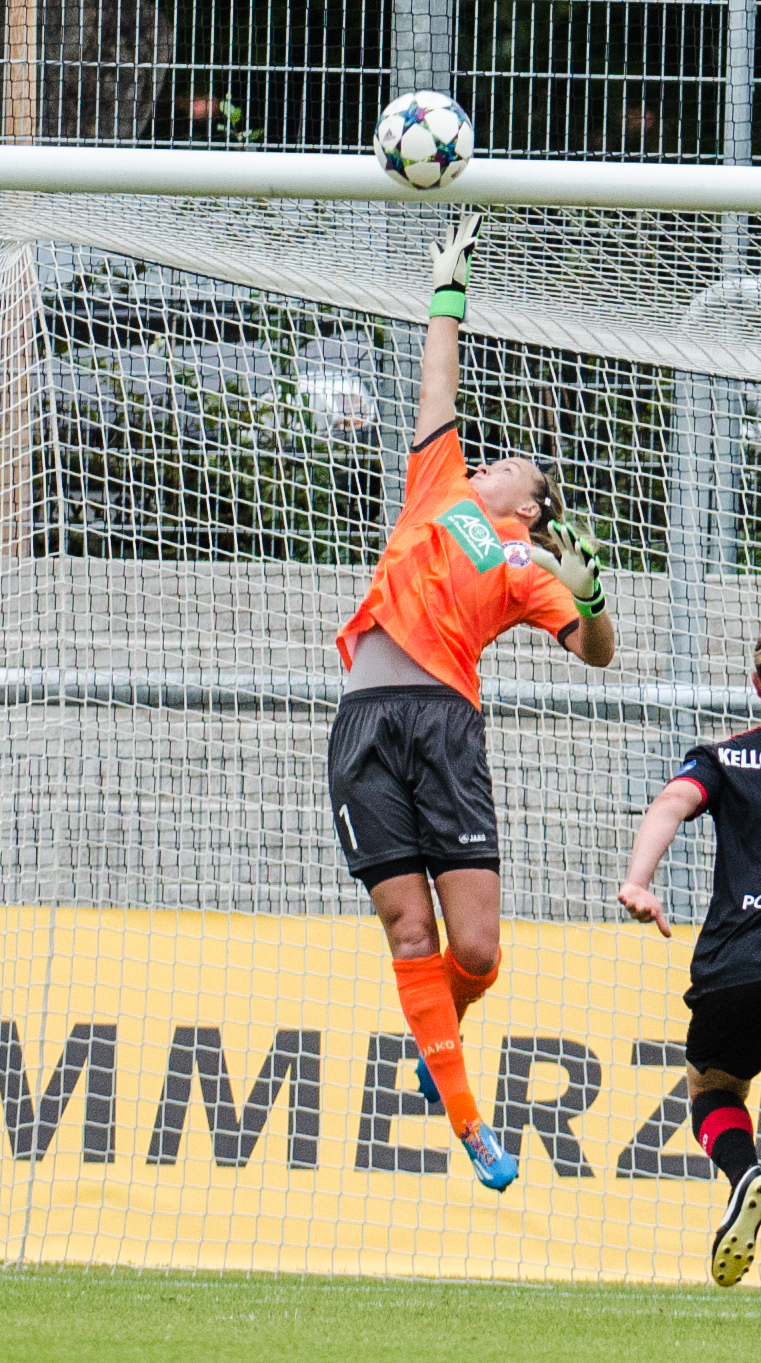
Schmitz making a save against Turbine Potsdam in 2015

Schmitz started playing football in 2007 at the youth division of FC Germania Zündorf where she was the only girl on the team. Schmitz started her senior career in the 2008–09 season with newly formed Bayer 04 Leverkusen women's team, playing in the 2. Bundesliga Süd at the time. Being the first goalkeeper, Schmitz saw plenty of action at Bayer Leverkusen. She saw the team promoted to Bundesliga in the 2010–11 season. During her time with Bayer Leverkusen, Schmitz was named best goalkeeper at the DFB-Hallenpokal in 2014 and 2015 and won that cup in 2015.

In 2015, after a grand total of 121 league appearances for Bayer Leverkusen, 86 of which were in the Bundesliga, Schmitz signed a two-year contract with Bayer Leverkusen's Bundesliga rival 1. FFC Turbine Potsdam.

After a total of four years at Turbine Potsdam and 69 Bundesliga appearances, Schmitz left Germany to join Montpellier HSC playing in the French Division 1. Féminine.

Schmitz returned to Germany after four years in France, signing a two-year contract with VfL Wolfsburg. The 2023–24 season was Schmitz's first experience not being the first goalkeeper of her team. Nevertheless, Schmitz made four appearances with VfL Wolfsburg in the Bundesliga and further two appearances in the Champions League qualifiers against Paris FC.

On 24 April 2025, Schmitz signed a two-year contract with her hometown club 1. FC Köln.

== International career ==
Schmitz made her debut for Germany under-15 national team in 2007. In 2008, she was part of the U17 team that won the UEFA U17 Championship and finished third at the FIFA U17 World Cup later that year. Being third choice goalkeeper behind Anna Felicitas Sarholz and Almuth Schult she did not appear in any of the tournament matches. In 2011, she was called up to the Germany team that won the UEFA U19 Championship and played in 4 matches at the tournament final.

== Career statistics ==
=== International ===
Appearances and goals by national team and year
| National team | Year | Apps | Goals |
|---|---|---|---|
Germany
| Germany | 2018 | 2 | 0 |
| Total | | 2 | 0 |

== Honours ==
Bayer 04 Leverkusen

- 2. Bundesliga South: 2009–10
- DFB-Hallenpokal: 2015

Germany U17

- UEFA Under-17 Championship: 2008
- FIFA U-17 Women's World Cup third place: 2008

Germany U19

- UEFA Under-19 Championship: 2011
