= 2009 in Norwegian football =

Football in Norway
- Season: 2009

Men's football
- Tippeligaen: Rosenborg
- 1. divisjon: Haugesund
- 2. divisjon: Strømmen (Group 1); Follo (Group 2); Sandnes Ulf (Group 3); Ranheim (Group 4)
- Cupen: Aalesund
- Superfinalen: Stabæk

Women's football
- Toppserien: Røa
- 1. divisjon: Linderud-Grei
- Cupen: Røa

The 2009 season was the 104th season of competitive football in Norway.

== Men's football ==
=== League season ===
==== Promotion and relegation ====
League	Promoted to league	Relegated from league
Tippeligaen	Odd Grenland; Sandefjord; Start	HamKam
1. divisjon	Mjøndalen; Skeid; Stavanger; Tromsdalen	Sandnes Ulf; Hødd
2. divisjon	Ulern; KFUM; FF Lillehammer; Åskollen; Fram Larvik; Start 2; Kopervik; Stord; Molde 2; Nardo; Bodø/Glimt 2; Bossekop	Modum; Østsiden; Sprint-Jeløy; KIL/Hemne; Groruddalen; Os; Viking 2; Senja; Skarp; Lofoten

==== Tippeligaen ====
Pos	Team	Pld	W	D	L	GF	GA	GD	Pts	Qualification or relegation
1	Rosenborg (C)	30	20	9	1	60	22	+38	69	Qualification for the Champions League second qualifying round
2	Molde	30	17	5	8	62	35	+27	56	Qualification for the Europa League second qualifying round
3	Stabæk	30	15	8	7	52	34	+18	53	Qualification for the Europa League second qualifying round
4	Odd Grenland	30	12	10	8	53	44	+9	46	
5	Brann	30	12	8	10	51	49	+2	44	
6	Tromsø	30	10	10	10	35	36	−1	40	
7	Vålerenga	30	12	4	14	47	50	−3	40	
8	Sandefjord	30	10	10	10	39	44	−5	40	
9	Start	30	10	10	10	46	52	−6	40	
10	Viking	30	9	11	10	38	40	−2	38	
11	Lillestrøm	30	9	10	11	43	50	−7	37	
12	Strømsgodset	30	10	6	14	40	42	−2	36	
13	Aalesund	30	9	9	12	34	43	−9	36	Qualification for the Europa League third qualifying round (Note: Aalesund won the 2009 Norwegian Cup and qualified for the third qualifying round of the UEFA Europa League.)
14	Fredrikstad (R)	30	10	4	16	39	44	−5	34	Qualification for the relegation play-offs
15	Bodø/Glimt (R)	30	6	10	14	29	53	−24	28	Relegation to First Division
16	Lyn (R)	30	2	10	18	29	59	−30	16	Relegation to First Division

Source: fotball.no
Rules for classification: 1) points; 2) goal difference; 3) number of goals scored.
(C) Champions; (R) Relegated

==== 1. divisjon ====
Pos	Team	Pld	W	D	L	GF	GA	GD	Pts	Promotion or relegation
1	Haugesund (C, P)	30	18	4	8	67	37	+30	58	Promotion to Tippeligaen
2	Hønefoss (P)	30	16	8	6	61	32	+29	56	Promotion to Tippeligaen
3	Kongsvinger (O, P)	30	18	2	10	52	37	+15	56	Qualification for the promotion play-offs
4	Sogndal	30	14	12	4	46	29	+17	54	Qualification for the promotion play-offs
5	Sarpsborg 08 (Note: Sarpsborg 08 deducted three points for failing to correctly inform the NFF of its financial situation.)	30	15	5	10	47	38	+9	47	Qualification for the promotion play-offs
6	Alta	30	12	6	12	50	49	+1	42	
7	Moss	30	12	5	13	47	53	−6	41	
8	Bryne	30	10	10	10	41	39	+2	40	
9	Nybergsund	30	11	7	12	49	54	−5	40	
10	Løv-Ham	30	11	7	12	44	50	−6	40	
11	Mjøndalen	30	10	9	11	38	39	−1	39	
12	Tromsdalen	30	11	6	13	38	54	−16	39	
13	HamKam (R)	30	11	4	15	56	48	+8	37	Relegation to Second Division
14	Notodden (R)	30	9	2	19	38	55	−17	29	Relegation to Second Division
15	Stavanger (R)	30	6	11	13	35	53	−18	29	Relegation to Second Division
16	Skeid (R)	30	4	6	20	26	66	−40	18	Relegation to Second Division

Source: nifs.no
Rules for classification: 1) points; 2) goal difference; 3) number of goals scored.
(C) Champions; (O) Play-off winners; (P) Promoted; (R) Relegated

==== 2. divisjon ====
===== Group 1 =====
Pos	Team	Pld	W	D	L	GF	GA	GD	Pts	Promotion or relegation
1	Strømmen (P)	26	20	3	3	77	31	+46	63	Promotion to First Division
2	Pors Grenland	26	18	3	5	76	44	+32	57	
3	FK Tønsberg	26	17	2	7	81	39	+42	53	
4	KFUM	26	14	6	6	55	34	+21	48	
5	Flekkerøy	26	14	4	8	70	51	+19	46	
6	Vindbjart	26	12	4	10	47	47	0	40	
7	Start 2	26	10	3	13	50	53	−3	33	
8	Fram Larvik	26	10	3	13	47	69	−22	33	
9	Vålerenga 2	26	8	6	12	58	67	−9	30	
10	Ullensaker/Kisa	26	8	4	14	49	53	−4	28	
11	Eidsvold Turn	26	6	10	10	38	50	−12	28	
12	Lillestrøm 2 (R)	26	7	2	17	34	64	−30	23	Relegation to Third Division
13	Mandalskameratene (R)	26	6	4	16	33	60	−27	22	Relegation to Third Division
14	Skjetten (R)	26	2	6	18	22	75	−53	12	Relegation to Third Division

(P) Promoted; (R) Relegated

===== Group 2 =====
Pos	Team	Pld	W	D	L	GF	GA	GD	Pts	Promotion or relegation
1	Follo (P)	26	19	3	4	59	25	+34	60	Promotion to First Division
2	Kristiansund	26	14	4	8	69	44	+25	46	
3	Hødd	26	14	4	8	54	37	+17	46	
4	Rosenborg 2	26	14	4	8	63	48	+15	46	
5	Lørenskog	26	13	6	7	55	38	+17	45	
6	Byåsen	26	11	7	8	52	38	+14	40	
7	Molde 2	26	12	2	12	50	47	+3	38	
8	Skarbøvik	26	10	4	12	45	45	0	34	
9	Strindheim	26	11	1	14	41	48	−7	34	
10	Nardo	26	8	9	9	37	39	−2	33	
11	Levanger	26	10	2	14	26	58	−32	32	
12	Steinkjer (Note: Steinkjer survived as the best number-twelve-team.)	26	8	5	13	47	70	−23	29	
13	Drøbak/Frogn (R)	26	6	2	18	45	64	−19	20	Relegation to Third Division
14	Ullern (R)	26	4	3	19	24	66	−42	15	Relegation to Third Division

(P) Promoted; (R) Relegated

===== Group 3 =====
Pos	Team	Pld	W	D	L	GF	GA	GD	Pts	Promotion or relegation
1	Sandnes Ulf (P)	26	19	4	3	88	28	+60	61	Promotion to First Division
2	Vard Haugesund	26	17	5	4	64	36	+28	56	
3	Ålgård	26	15	5	6	55	34	+21	50	
4	Åsane	26	15	4	7	57	31	+26	49	
5	Randaberg	26	14	4	8	60	39	+21	46	
6	Kopervik	26	12	5	9	61	58	+3	41	
7	Strømsgodset 2	26	8	7	11	56	62	−6	31	
8	Stord	26	9	2	15	48	62	−14	29	
9	Fredrikstad 2 (Note: Fredrikstad 2 was forcibly relegated since its first team was relegated to the First Division.) (R)	26	8	5	13	46	69	−23	29	Relegation to Third Division
10	Nest-Sotra	26	8	5	13	51	77	−26	29	
11	Fana	26	8	4	14	47	66	−19	28	
12	Fyllingen (R)	26	8	3	15	37	64	−27	27	Relegation to Third Division
13	Lyn 2 (R)	26	5	6	15	39	49	−10	21	Relegation to Third Division
14	Drammen (R)	26	5	3	18	30	64	−34	18	Relegation to Third Division

(P) Promoted; (R) Relegated

===== Group 4 =====
Pos	Team	Pld	W	D	L	GF	GA	GD	Pts	Promotion or relegation
1	Ranheim (P)	26	17	4	5	64	21	+43	55	Promotion to First Division
2	Raufoss	26	16	2	8	65	39	+26	50	
3	Asker	26	15	4	7	63	31	+32	49	
4	Stabæk 2	26	13	6	7	53	37	+16	45	
5	Manglerud Star	26	15	0	11	52	38	+14	45	
6	Valdres	26	13	6	7	53	41	+12	45	
7	Bærum	26	13	3	10	61	46	+15	42	
8	FF Lillehammer	26	10	9	7	44	43	+1	39	
9	Kjelsås	26	9	5	12	38	47	−9	32	
10	Tromsø 2	26	9	4	13	35	55	−20	31	
11	Mo	26	6	10	10	40	55	−15	28	
12	Korsvoll (R)	26	7	6	13	39	45	−6	27	Relegation to Third Division
13	Bodø/Glimt 2 (R)	26	6	0	20	23	77	−54	18	Relegation to Third Division
14	Bossekop (R)	26	1	5	20	29	84	−55	8	Relegation to Third Division

(P) Promoted; (R) Relegated

=== Cup competitions ===
==== Norwegian Cup ====
===== Final =====
8 November 2009
13:15 CET (UTC+1)

Molde	2–2 (a.e.t.)	Aalesund
Biram Diouf 27', 96'	Report	Roberts 54'; Aarøy 114'
Penalties
Mota (penalty missed); Thioune (penalty scored); Forren (penalty scored); Steen (penalty scored); Paté Diouf (penalty scored)	4–5	(penalty scored) Stephenson; (penalty scored) Arneng; (penalty scored) Herrera; (penalty scored) Phillips; (penalty scored) Skiri

Ullevaal Stadion, Oslo
Attendance: 25,109
Referee: Kristoffer Helgerud (Lier)

==== Superfinalen ====
8 March 2009
19:00 CET

Stabæk	3–1	Vålerenga
Nannskog 19'; Kobayashi 38'; Pálmason 56'	Report	Abdellaoue 48'

Telenor Arena, Bærum
Attendance: 6,362
Referee: Terje Hauge (Olsvik)

== Women's football ==
=== League season ===
==== Promotion and relegation ====
League	Promoted to league	Relegated from league
Toppserien	Sandviken; Fortuna Ålesund	Larvik; Fart
1. divisjon	Alta; Orkla	none

==== Toppserien ====
Pos	Team	Pld	W	D	L	GF	GA	GD	Pts	Qualification or relegation
1	Røa (C)	22	18	2	2	64	16	+48	56	Qualification for the Champions League round of 32
2	Stabæk	22	16	5	1	83	15	+68	53	
3	Kolbotn	22	16	2	4	51	25	+26	50	
4	Team Strømmen	22	11	3	8	48	31	+17	36	
5	Arna-Bjørnar	22	9	6	7	37	35	+2	33	
6	Trondheims-Ørn	22	9	4	9	37	41	−4	31	
7	Klepp	22	8	6	8	39	38	+1	30	
8	Kattem	22	7	4	11	28	45	−17	25	
9	Amazon Grimstad	22	7	1	14	14	33	−19	22	
10	Fløya	22	7	4	11	36	37	−1	21 (Note: Fløya 4 points deducted for using ineligible players.)	
11	Sandviken (R)	22	3	2	17	20	72	−52	11	Relegation to First Division
12	Fortuna Ålesund (R)	22	0	3	19	18	87	−69	3	Relegation to First Division

Source: rsssf.no
Rules for classification: 1) points; 2) goal difference; 3) number of goals scored.
(C) Champions; (R) Relegated

=== Norwegian Women's Cup ===
==== Final ====
- Team Strømmen 0–1 Røa

== Men's UEFA competitions ==
=== Champions League ===
==== Qualifying phase ====
===== Second qualifying round =====
Team 1	Agg.	Team 2	1st leg	2nd leg
Tirana (Albania)	1–5	(Norway) Stabæk	1–1	0–4

===== Third qualifying round =====
Team 1	Agg.	Team 2	1st leg	2nd leg
Copenhagen (Denmark)	3–1	(Norway) Stabæk	3–1	0–0

=== UEFA Europa League ===
==== Qualifying phase ====
===== First qualifying round =====
Team 1	Agg.	Team 2	1st leg	2nd leg
NSÍ Runavík (Faroe Islands)	1–6	(Norway) Rosenborg	0–3	1–3

===== Second qualifying round =====
Team 1	Agg.	Team 2	1st leg	2nd leg
Rosenborg (Norway)	0–1	(Azerbaijan) Karabakh	0–0	0–1
Dinamo Minsk (Belarus)	1–4	(Norway) Tromsø	0–0	1–4

===== Third qualifying round =====
Team 1	Agg.	Team 2	1st leg	2nd leg
Fredrikstad (Norway)	3–7	(Poland) Lech Poznań	1–6	2–1
Vålerenga (Norway)	2–2 (a)	(Greece) PAOK	1–2	1–0
Tromsø (Norway)	4–1	(Croatia) Slaven Belupo	2–1	2–0

===== Play-off round =====
Team 1	Agg.	Team 2	1st leg	2nd leg
Athletic Bilbao (Spain)	4–3	(Norway) Tromsø	3–2	1–1
Stabæk (Norway)	1–7	(Spain) Valencia	0–3	1–4

== UEFA Women's Champions League ==
=== Qualifying round ===
==== Group G ====
Pos	Team	Pld	W	D	L	GF	GA	GD	Pts	Qualification	EVE	STR	LTA	OSI
1	(England) Everton	3	3	0	0	11	1	+10	9	Advance to main round	—	–	7–0	3–1
2	(Norway) Team Strømmen	3	2	0	1	14	1	+13	6		0–1	—	5–0	–
3	(Estonia) Levadia Tallinn	3	1	0	2	4	13	−9	3		–	–	—	–
4	(Croatia) Osijek (H)	3	0	0	3	2	16	−14	0		–	0–9	4–1	—

Source: RSSSF
(H) Hosts

Matches (played in Osijek, Croatia)

Team Strømmen 5–0 Levadia Tallinn
Osijek 0–9 Team Strømmen
Team Strømmen 0–1 Everton

=== Main round ===
==== Round of 32 ====
Team 1	Agg.	Team 2	1st leg	2nd leg
Røa (Norway)	3–2	(England) Everton	3–0	0–2

==== Round of 16 ====
Team 1	Agg.	Team 2	1st leg	2nd leg
Røa (Norway)	1–1 (a)	(Russia) Zvezda 2005 Perm	0–0	1–1

==== Quarter-finals ====
Team 1	Agg.	Team 2	1st leg	2nd leg
Turbine Potsdam (Germany)	10–0	(Norway) Røa	5–0	5–0

== National teams ==
=== Norway men's national football team ===
==== 2010 FIFA World Cup qualification (UEFA) ====
===== Group 9 =====
Pos	Team	Pld	W	D	L	GF	GA	GD	Pts	Qualification	(Netherlands)	(Norway)	(Scotland)	(North Macedonia)	(Iceland)
1	Netherlands	8	8	0	0	17	2	+15	24	Qualification to 2010 FIFA World Cup	—	2–0	3–0	4–0	2–0
2	Norway	8	2	4	2	9	7	+2	10		0–1	—	4–0	2–1	2–2
3	Scotland	8	3	1	4	6	11	−5	10		0–1	0–0	—	2–0	2–1
4	Macedonia	8	2	1	5	5	11	−6	7		1–2	0–0	1–0	—	2–0
5	Iceland	8	1	2	5	7	13	−6	5		1–2	1–1	1–2	1–0	—

==== Fixtures and results ====
Date	Venue	Opponents	Score	Competition	Norwegian goalscorers
11 February	LTU Arena, Düsseldorf (A)	Germany	1 – 0 Report	Friendly	Christian Grindheim
28 March	Royal Bafokeng Stadium, Rustenburg (A)	South Africa	1 – 2 Report	Friendly	Morten Gamst Pedersen
1 April	Ullevaal Stadion, Oslo (H)	Finland	3 – 2 Report	Friendly	John Arne Riise; Jon Inge Høiland; Morten Gamst Pedersen
6 June	Philip II Arena, Skopje (A)	North Macedonia	0 – 0 Report	World Cup Qualifier	
10 June	Feijenoord Stadion, Rotterdam (A)	Netherlands	0 – 2 Report	World Cup Qualifier	
12 August	Ullevaal Stadion, Oslo (H)	Scotland	4 – 0 Report	World Cup Qualifier	John Arne Riise; Morten Gamst Pedersen (2); Erik Huseklepp
5 September	Laugardalsvöllur, Reykjavík (A)	Iceland	1 – 1 Report	World Cup Qualifier	John Arne Riise
9 September	Ullevaal Stadion, Oslo (H)	North Macedonia	2 – 1 Report	World Cup Qualifier	John Arne Riise; Thorstein Helstad
10 October	Ullevaal Stadion, Oslo (H)	South Africa	1 – 0	Friendly	Kjetil Wæhler
14 November	Stade de Genève, Geneva (A)	Switzerland	1 – 0 Report	Friendly	John Carew

Key

- H = Home match
- A = Away match
- N = Neutral ground
