= Julia Simic =

German footballer (born 1989)

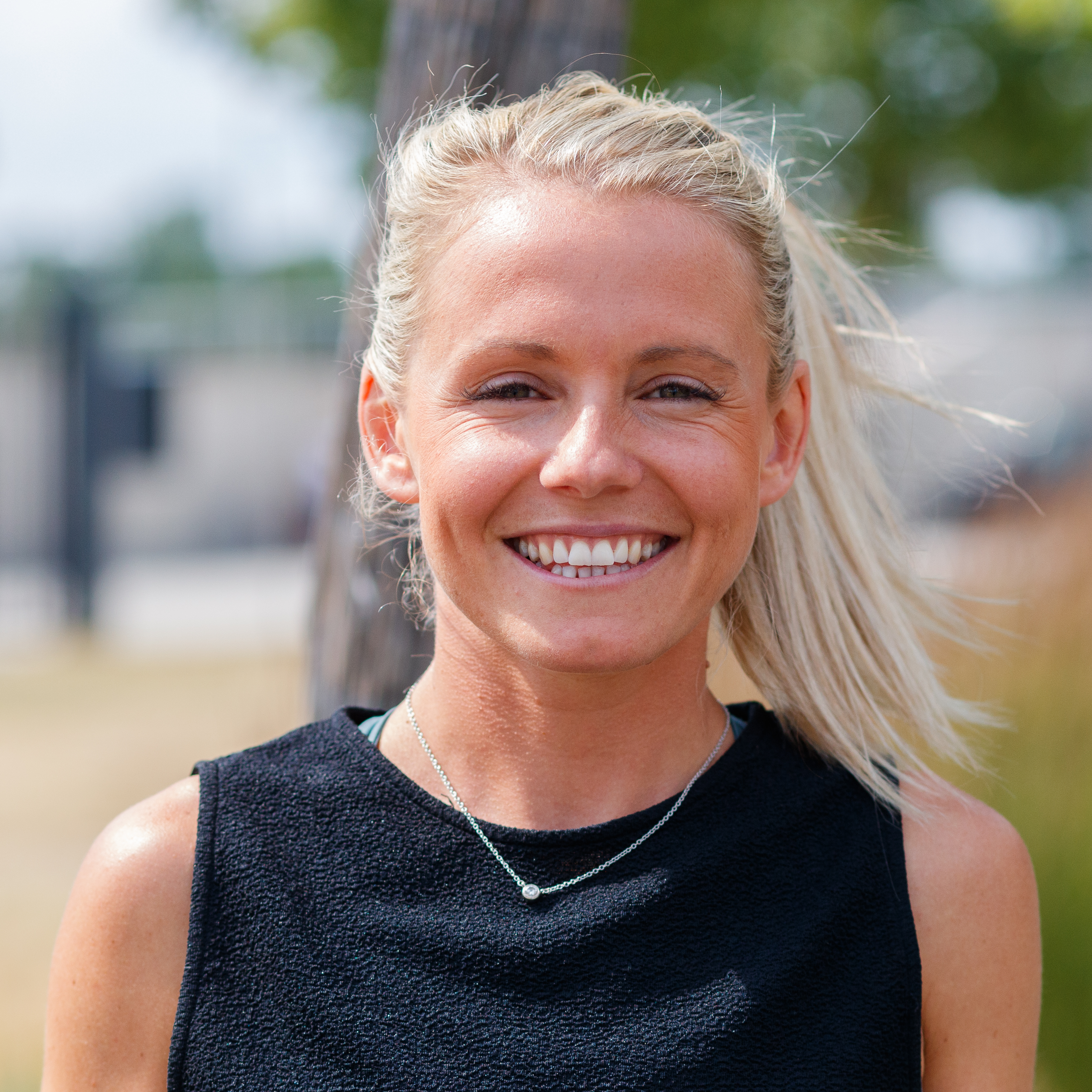
- Simic in 2023

Personal information
- Full name: Julia Simic
- Date of birth: 14 May 1989 (age 37)
- Place of birth: Fürth, West Germany
- Height: 1.62 m (5 ft 4 in)
- Position: Midfielder

Youth career
- Tuspo Fürth
- ASV Vach
- DJK Eibach
- SV 1873 Nürnburg Süd

Senior career*
Years	Team	Apps	(Gls)
2005–2013	Bayern Munich	105	(34)
2013–2015	1. FFC Turbine Potsdam	34	(14)
2015–2017	VfL Wolfsburg	24	(4)
2017–2018	SC Freiburg	18	(0)
2018–2020	West Ham United	16	(2)
2020–2021	Milan	4	(0)

International career
2004	Germany U15	9	(9)
2004–2006	Germany U17	20	(5)
2007	Germany U19	14	(9)
2008	Germany U20	6	(2)
2009–2013	Germany U23	6	(1)
2016–2021	Germany	2	(0)
- * Club domestic league appearances and goals

Julia Simic (born 14 May 1989) is a German retired women's footballer and coach, who is currently the assistant coach of the Switzerland women's national football team. As a player, she won the Bundesliga, DFB-Pokal Frauen and played for several of Germany's youth teams, as well as two games with the senior national team.

== Club career ==
Simic was born on 14 May 1989 in Fürth and is of German and Croatian descent. She emerged as a talented midfielder during her time in the youth team of SV 1873 Nürnberg Süd.

In 2005, aged just 16, Simic signed for Bayern Munich. She spent eight seasons at the club, making over 100 league appearances and scoring more than 30 goals. She won the 2011–12 DFB-Pokal trophy.

She moved to Turbine Potsdam in 2013 and helped them to reach the UEFA Women's Champions League semi-finals. Simic signed a contract with Women's Bundesliga champions Wolfsburg, that began on 1 January 2015 and will end in 2017.

Then-Wolfsburg coach Ralf Kellermann said: "With Julia Simic we have added a goalscoring midfielder. It is a clear gain for us, especially given that the second half of the season brings much tougher games." She won the DFB-Pokal in both of her two full seasons at the club and also lifted the 2016–17 Frauen-Bundesliga title with Wolfsburg.

In July 2018, after having spent one year with SC Freiburg, she left Germany for the English side West Ham United. In August 2020, Simic joined A.C. Milan, however she was limited to just four league appearances during the season due to injury.

Having unfortunately been set back by injuries on several occasions throughout her career, Simic announced her retirement from professional football on 31 May 2021. The announcement came a day after Milan lost the 2020–21 Coppa Italia final to Roma on penalties.

== International career ==
Simic represented Germany at the U15, U17, U19, U20 and U23 youth team levels. She won the UEFA Women's Under-19 Championship in 2007. Simic also helped her country to third at the FIFA U-20 Women's World Cup in 2008, scoring in the 5-3 third-place playoff victory over France.

Simic was named to the senior national team's squad for the first 2013 Euro qualification stage match against Switzerland after Dzsenifer Marozsán got injured, but she suffered an ACL injury in her first training. She missed most of the 2011–12 season.

Simic eventually made her senior debut for Germany against Austria in 2016.

== Post-playing career ==
After retiring, Simic has appeared on television as a pundit and analyst for channels like Sky Sports and DAZN. She also occasionally commentates on Bundesliga matches. Simic has a coaching A-License and she worked under Friederike Kromp as an assistant coach both in the under-16 and under-17 Germany national teams between 2021 and 2023.

In July 2023, Simic became assistant coach of Eintracht Frankfurt's under-20 women's team. This role saw her work once more alongside Kromp. Ahead of the 2025–26 season and with Kromp stepping down, Frankfurt confirmed that Simic would replace Kromp as head coach of the U-20 team.

In December 2025, the Swiss Football Association announced that Simic would take over as the assistant coach of the Switzerland women's national team, beginning the role in January 2026 under head coach Rafel Navarro.

== Honours ==
Bayern Munich

- DFB-Pokal: 2011–12
- Bundesliga Cup: 2011

1. FFC Turbine Potsdam

- DFB-Hallenpokal: 2014

VfL Wolfsburg

- Bundesliga: 2016–17
- DFB-Pokal: 2014–15, 2015–16, 2016–17

West Ham United

- Women's FA Cup: Finalists 2018–19

Germany U19

- UEFA Women's Under-19 Championship: 2007
