= Anja Mittag =

German footballer (born 1985)

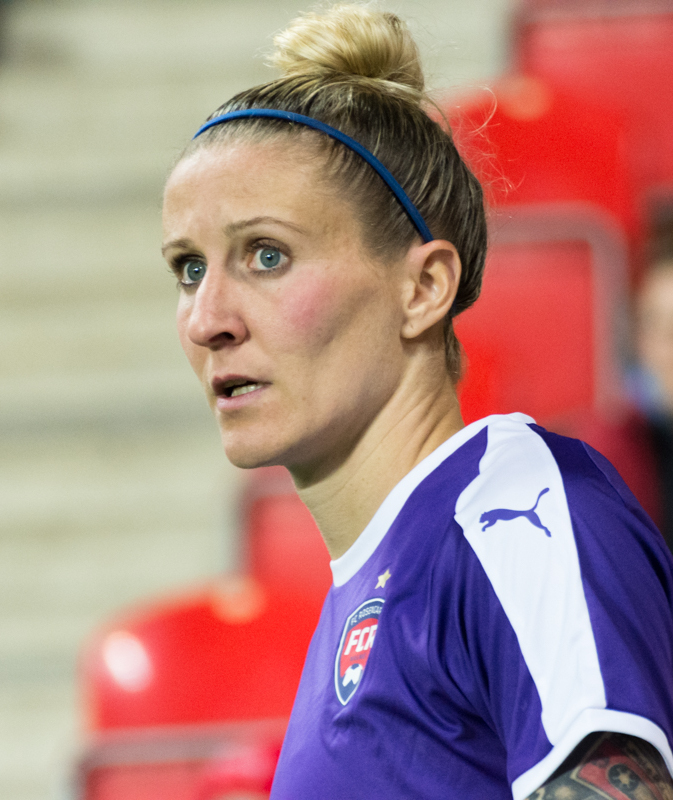
- Mittag with Rosengård in 2018

Personal information
- Full name: Anja Mittag
- Date of birth: 16 May 1985 (age 41)
- Place of birth: Karl-Marx-Stadt, East Germany
- Height: 1.68 m (5 ft 6 in)
- Position: Striker

Youth career
- 1991–1997: VfB Chemnitz
- 1997–1999: Chemnitzer FC
- 2000–2002: FC Erzgebirge Aue

Senior career*
Years	Team	Apps	(Gls)
2002–2006	Turbine Potsdam	83	(55)
2006	QBIK		
2007–2011	Turbine Potsdam	79	(61)
2012–2015	FC Rosengård	69	(62)
2015–2016	Paris Saint-Germain	18	(10)
2016–2017	VfL Wolfsburg	10	(1)
2017–2019	FC Rosengård	47	(22)
2019–2020	RB Leipzig	24	(23)
2022–2023	SV Eintracht Leipzig-Süd	3	(1)
2023–2025	BSG Chemie Leipzig	10	(14)

International career
2001	Germany U17	3	(4)
2002–2004	Germany U19	58	(32)
2004–2017	Germany	158	(50)

Managerial career
- 2019–2020: RB Leipzig (player-coach)
- 2020–2025: RB Leipzig (assistant)
- 2025–2026: San Diego Wave (assistant)
Medal record
Women's football
Representing Germany
FIFA Women's World Cup
Gold medal – first place	2007 China
Olympic Games
Bronze medal – third place	2008 Beijing	Team
Gold medal – first place	2016 Rio de Janeiro	Team
UEFA Women's Championship
Gold medal – first place	2005 England
Gold medal – first place	2009 Finland
Gold medal – first place	2013 Sweden
- * Club domestic league appearances and goals

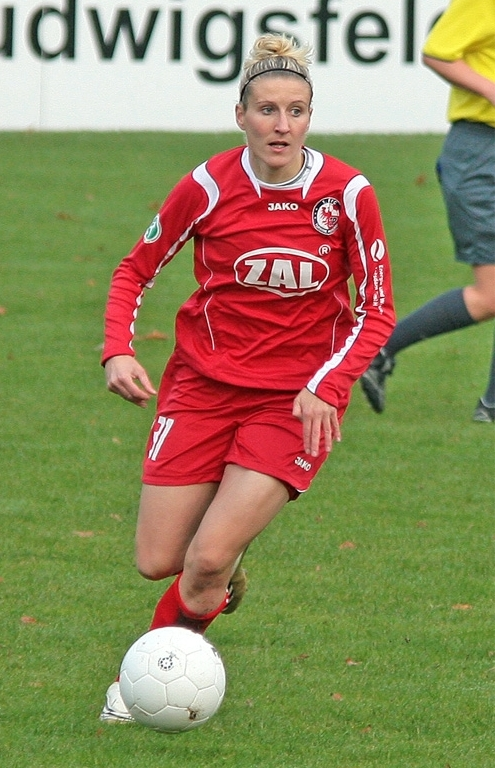
Mittag playing for Potsdam in 2008.

Anja Mittag (German pronunciation: [ˈʔanja ˈmɪtaːk]; born 16 May 1985) is a German football coach and former player who played as a striker.

In July 2020, Mittag announced that she would end her playing career after the women's Saxony Cup final on 30 August 2020 and become a full-time coach with RB Leipzig. She made her comeback in the 2021–22 season with SV Eintrach Leipzig-Süd in the German Regionalliga Nordost.

== Club career ==
In December 2011, Mittag negotiated a release from 1. FFC Turbine Potsdam after nine and a half years in order to sign a two-year deal with Swedish Damallsvenskan club FC Rosengård (then known as LdB FC Malmö). In May 2015, she signed a two-year deal with French club Paris Saint-Germain. On 30 August 2016, Mittag joined German club VfL Wolfsburg on a two-year deal. On 31 March 2017, Mittag signed a contract with Rosengård once again.

Mittag became the first player to 50 goals in the UEFA Women's Champions League and its predecessor the UEFA Women's Cup on 11 October 2017.

Mittag ended her playing career after the women's Saxony Cup final on 30 August 2020.

== International career ==
Mittag made her debut for the senior national team as a substitute in a friendly match with Italy on 31 March 2004. Her first goal with the senior national team came on 11 March 2005 in an Algarve Cup match against Norway.

She was part of the squad for the 2016 Summer Olympics, where Germany won the gold medal.

On 22 August 2017, she announced her retirement from international football.

== Coaching career ==
In June 2019, Mittag joined third-tier German club RB Leipzig as a player-coach. After scoring 17 goals and helping the team win promotion to the 2. Frauen-Bundesliga, Mittag announced that she would focus on coaching full-time from the 2020–21 season onward.

On 11 August 2025, Mittag was hired by NWSL club San Diego Wave FC as an Individual Development Coach.

== Career statistics ==
Scores and results list Germany's goal tally first, score column indicates score after each Mittag goal.

List of international goals scored by Anja Mittag
No.	Date	Venue	Opponent	Score	Result	Competition
1	11 March 2005	Silves, Portugal	Norway	1–0	4–0	2005 Algarve Cup
2	9 June 2005	Preston, England	Italy	4–0	4–0	UEFA Women's Euro 2005
3	12 March 2007	Vila Real de Santo António, Portugal	Denmark	1–0	3–0	2007 Algarve Cup
4	12 March 2007	Vila Real de Santo António, Portugal	Denmark	2–0	3–0	2007 Algarve Cup
5	12 April 2007	Wattenscheid, Germany	Netherlands	2–1	5–1	UEFA Women's Euro 2009 qualifying
6	12 August 2008	Tianjin, China	North Korea	1–0	1–0	2008 Summer Olympics
7	22 April 2009	Frankfurt, Germany	Brazil	1–0	1–1	Friendly
8	24 August 2009	Tampere, Finland]	Norway	3–0	4–0	UEFA Women's Euro 2009
9	1 March 2010	Faro, Portugal	China	2–0	5–0	2010 Algarve Cup
10	1 March 2010	Faro, Portugal	China	3–0	5–0	2010 Algarve Cup
11	29 February 2012	Lagos, Portugal	Iceland	1–0	1–0	2012 Algarve Cup
12	5 April 2012	Aarau, Switzerland	Switzerland	2–0	6–0	UEFA Women's Euro 2013 qualifying
13	15 September 2012	Karaganda, Kazakhstan	Kazakhstan	4–0	7–0	UEFA Women's Euro 2013 qualifying
14	19 September 2012	Duisburg, Germany	Turkey	2–0	10–0	UEFA Women's Euro 2013 qualifying
15	20 October 2012	Bridgeview, United States	United States	1–1	1–1	Friendly
16	5 April 2013	Offenbach, Germany	United States	3–3	3–3	Friendly
17	28 July 2013	Solna, Sweden	Norway	1–0	1–0	UEFA Women's Euro 2013
18	26 October 2013	Koper, Slovenia	Slovenia	3–0	13–0	2015 FIFA Women's World Cup qualification
19	26 October 2013	Koper, Slovenia	Slovenia	5–0	13–0	2015 FIFA Women's World Cup qualification
20	26 October 2013	Koper, Slovenia	Slovenia	9–0	13–0	2015 FIFA Women's World Cup qualification
21	23 November 2013	Žilina, Slovakia	Slovakia	2–0	6–0	2015 FIFA Women's World Cup qualification
22	23 November 2013	Žilina, Slovakia	Slovakia	3–0	6–0	2015 FIFA Women's World Cup qualification
23	27 November 2013	Osijek, Croatia	Croatia	4–0	8–0	2015 FIFA Women's World Cup qualification
24	7 March 2014	Albufeira, Portugal	China	1–0	1–0	2014 Algarve Cup
25	10 March 2014	Albufeira, Portugal	Norway	3–1	3–1	2014 Algarve Cup
26	12 March 2014	Faro, Portugal	Japan	2–0	3–0	2014 Algarve Cup
27	10 April 2014	Mannheim, Germany	Slovenia	2–0	4–0	2015 FIFA Women's World Cup qualification
28	10 April 2014	Mannheim, Germany	Slovenia	4–0	4–0	2015 FIFA Women's World Cup qualification
29	8 May 2014	Osnabrück, Germany	Slovakia	2–0	9–1	2015 FIFA Women's World Cup qualification
30	8 May 2014	Osnabrück, Germany	Slovakia	9–0	9–1	2015 FIFA Women's World Cup qualification
31	17 September 2014	Heidenheim, Germany	Republic of Ireland	2–0	2–0	2015 FIFA Women's World Cup qualification
32	6 March 2015	Vila Real de Santo António, Portugal	China	1–0	2–0	2015 Algarve Cup
33	11 March 2015	Parchal, Portugal	Sweden	1–0	2–1	2015 Algarve Cup
34	7 June 2015	Ottawa, Canada	Ivory Coast	3–0	10–0	2015 FIFA Women's World Cup
35	7 June 2015	Ottawa, Canada	Ivory Coast	5–0	10–0	2015 FIFA Women's World Cup
36	7 June 2015	Ottawa, Canada	Ivory Coast	6–0	10–0	2015 FIFA Women's World Cup
37	11 June 2015	Ottawa, Canada	Norway	1–0	1–1	2015 FIFA Women's World Cup
38	20 June 2015	Ottawa, Canada	Sweden	1–0	4–1	2015 FIFA Women's World Cup
39	25 October 2015	Sandhausen, Germany	Turkey	2–0	7–0	UEFA Women's Euro 2017 qualifying
40	9 March 2016	Boca Raton, United States	United States	1–0	1–2	2016 SheBelieves Cup
41	8 April 2016	Istanbul, Turkey	Turkey	2–0	6–0	UEFA Women's Euro 2017 qualifying
42	12 April 2016	Osnabrück, Germany	Croatia	2–0	2–0	UEFA Women's Euro 2017 qualifying
43	22 July 2016	Paderborn, Germany	Ghana	1–0	11–0	Friendly
44	22 July 2016	Paderborn, Germany	Ghana	7–0	11–0	Friendly
45	22 July 2016	Paderborn, Germany	Ghana	8–0	11–0	Friendly
46	22 July 2016	Paderborn, Germany	Ghana	9–0	11–0	Friendly
47	22 October 2016	Regensburg, Germany	Austria	1–0	4–2	Friendly
48	22 October 2016	Regensburg, Germany	Austria	2–0	4–2	Friendly
49	25 October 2016	Aalen, Germany	Netherlands	3–1	4–2	Friendly
50	7 March 2017	Washington, D.C., United States	England	1–0	1–0	2017 SheBelieves Cup

== Honours ==
1. FFC Turbine Potsdam

- Bundesliga: 2003–04, 2005–06, 2008–09, 2009–10, 2010–11
- DFB-Pokal: 2003–04, 2004–05, 2005–06
- UEFA Women's Champions League: 2004–05, 2009–10
- DFB-Hallenpokal for women: 2004, 2005, 2008, 2009, 2010

FC Rosengård

- Damallsvenskan: 2013, 2014
- Svenska Supercupen: 2012, 2015

Germany

- FIFA Women's World Cup: 2007
- UEFA Women's Championship: 2005, 2009, 2013
- Football at the Summer Olympics: Bronze medal 2008, Gold medal 2016
- Algarve Cup: 2006, 2012, 2014

Germany U20

- FIFA U-20 Women's World Cup: 2004

Germany U19

- UEFA Women's Under-19 Championship: 2002

Individual

- Sweden's Player of the Year 2012, 2014
- Damallsvenskan top scorers: 2012, 2014, 2018
- FIFA Women's World Cup Bronze Boot: 2015
- FIFA Women's World Cup All Star Team: 2015
- FIFA Women's World Cup Dream Team: 2015
- UEFA Women's Champions League All-Time Top Scorer
- FIFA U-20 Women's World Cup Bronze Ball: 2004
- FIFA U-20 Women's World Cup Silver Shoe: 2004
- Fritz Walter Medal: Gold 2005
- UEFA Women's Under-19 Championship: Golden Player 2004
- FIFPro: FIFA FIFPro World XI 2015
- Silbernes Lorbeerblatt: 2007, 2016

Records

- 2nd all-time UEFA women's club competition top scorer: 51 goals

== Others ==
Together with her former teammate Josephine Henning she runs the podcast Mittag’s bei Henning.
