= Anna Felicitas Sarholz =

German footballer (born 1992)

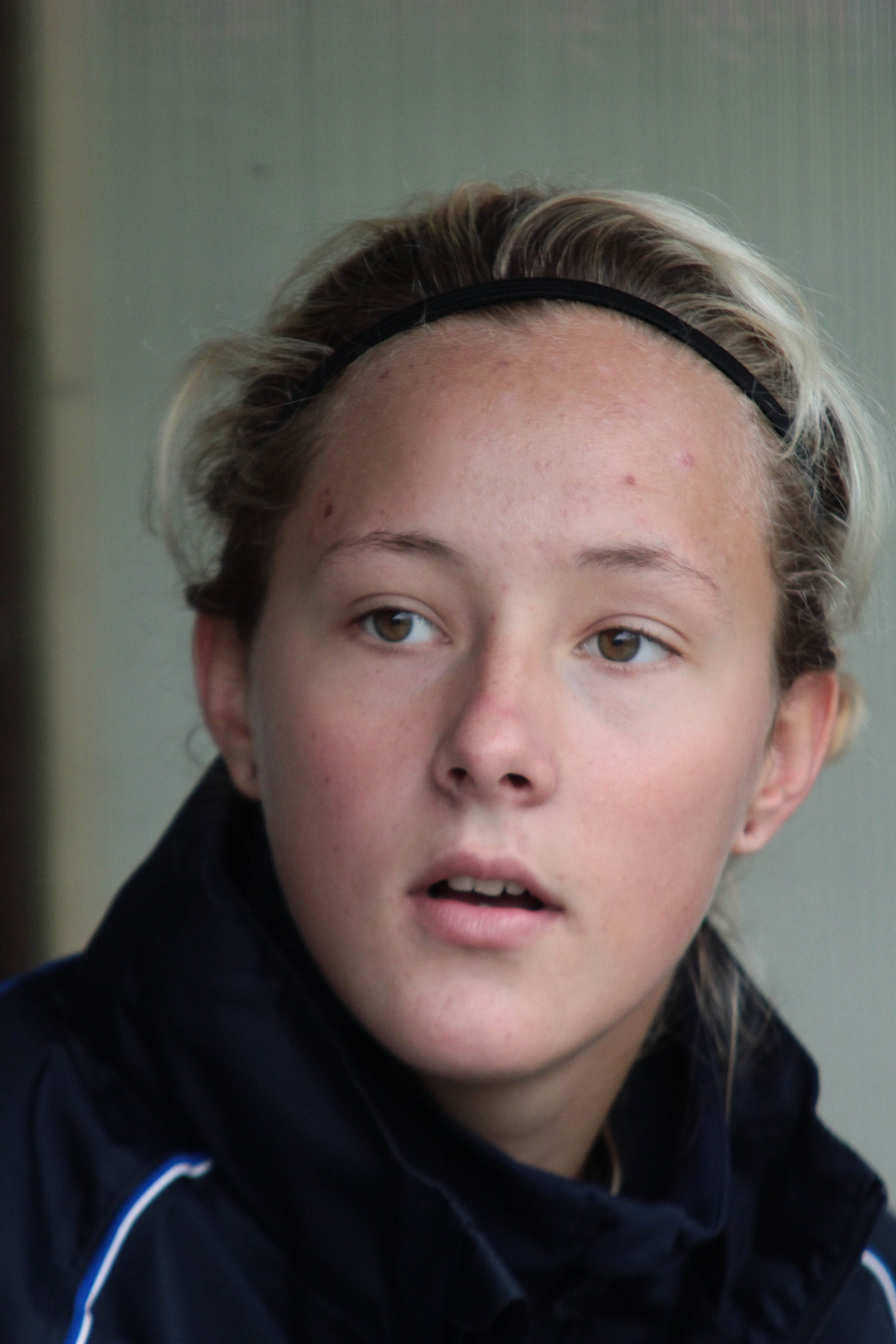

Personal information
- Full name: Anna Felicitas Sarholz
- Date of birth: 5 July 1992 (age 34)
- Place of birth: Cologne, Germany
- Height: 1.80 m (5 ft 11 in)
- Position: Goalkeeper

Youth career
- SV Bübingen 09
- –2006: SV Germania 08 Roßlau
- 2006–2008: 1. FFC Turbine Potsdam

Senior career*
Years	Team	Apps	(Gls)
2008–2015	1. FFC Turbine Potsdam	41	(0)
2008–2014	→ 1. FFC Turbine Potsdam II	17	(0)
2015–2017	SV Babelsberg 03	32	(9)
2018–2021	RB Leipzig	5	(0)

International career
2008	Germany U17	11	(0)

Managerial career
- 2015–2017: SV Babelsberg 03 (E-Juniors)
- * Club domestic league appearances and goals as of 10 May 2019

Anna Felicitas Sarholz (born 5 July 1992) is a German footballer. She last played and also served as the goalkeeping coach for the women's section of RB Leipzig.

== Honours ==
=== 1. FFC Turbine Potsdam ===
- Bundesliga: Winner (4) 2008–09, 2009–10, 2010–11, 2011–12
- German Cup: Runner-up (1) 2008–09
- UEFA Women's Champions League: Winner (1) 2009–10
- DFB-Hallenpokal: Winner (3) 2010, 2013, 2014

=== Germany ===
- FIFA U-17 Women's World Cup: Third place 2008
- UEFA Women's Under-17 Championship: Winner (2) 2008, 2009
