= Hanna Pettersson =

Swedish football striker (born 1987)

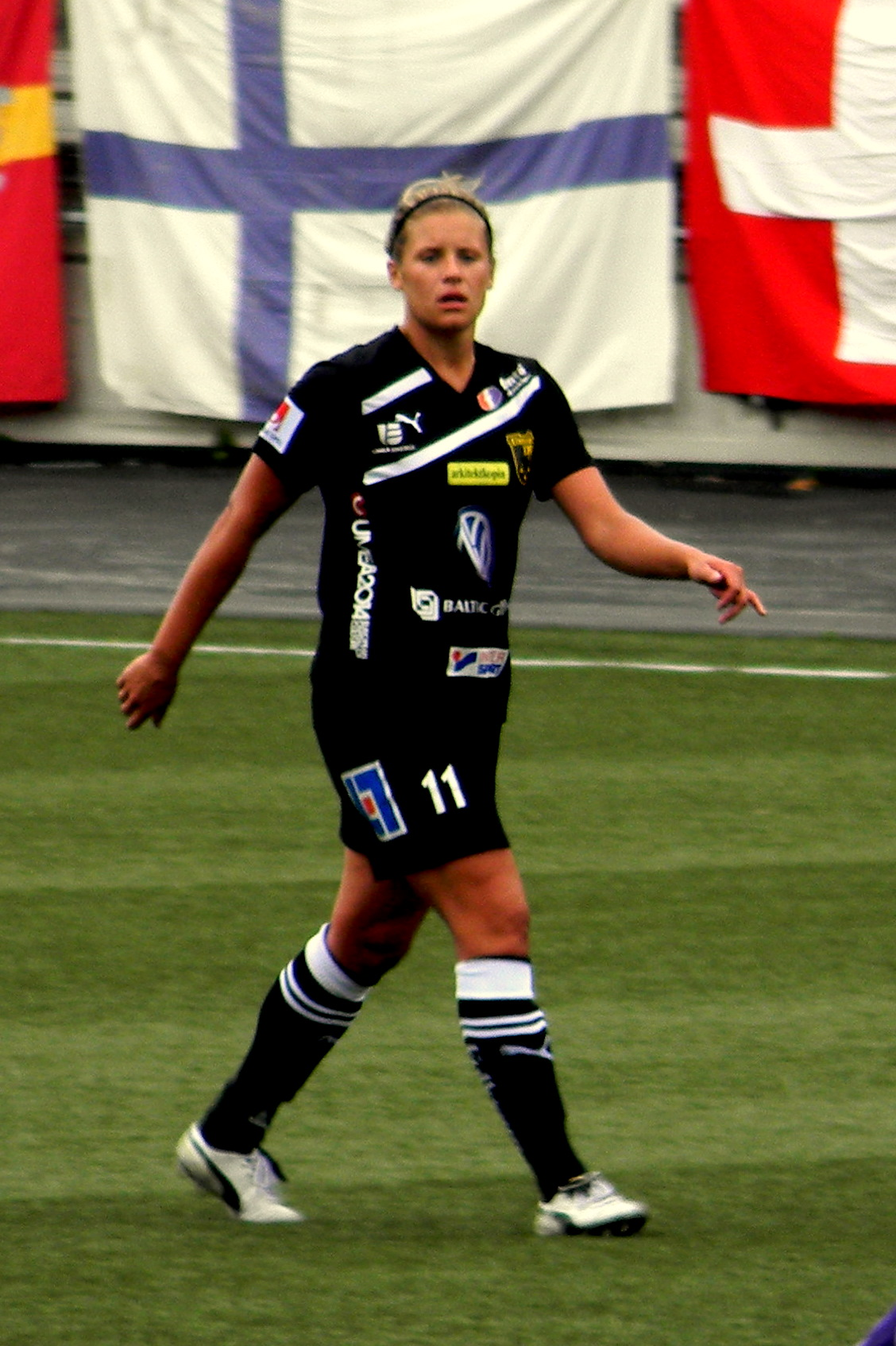

Personal information
- Full name: Hanna Pettersson
- Date of birth: 10 November 1987 (age 38)
- Place of birth: Sweden
- Height: 1.70 m (5 ft 7 in)
- Position: Striker

Youth career
- Mosås SK

Senior career*
Years	Team	Apps	(Gls)
- Adolfsbergs IK
- Glanshammars IF
2008	KIF Örebro DFF	18	(5)
2009	Stattena IF	22	(5)
2010–2011	Umeå IK	30	(8)
2012–2017	Piteå IF	55	(15)
- * Club domestic league appearances and goals

Hanna Pettersson (born 10 November 1987) is a Swedish football striker currently playing for Piteå IF in Sweden's Damallsvenskan. She previously played for Stattena IF, KIF Örebro DFF and Umeå IK.

In April 2010 Pettersson scored twice on her Umeå debut, a 3–2 UEFA Women's Champions League semi final defeat away to Lyon.

In May 2013 she suffered an anterior cruciate ligament injury while playing for Piteå.
