= Nasra Abdullah =

Norwegian footballer (born 1985)

Personal information
- Full name: Nasra Abdullah Reinsberg
- Birth name: Nasra Badalla Abdullah
- Date of birth: 13 July 1985 (age 41)
- Place of birth: Kakamega, Kenya
- Height: 1.55 m (5 ft 1 in)
- Positions: Midfielder; striker

Youth career
- 2005: UAB Blazers

Senior career*
Years	Team	Apps	(Gls)
2002–2013	Lillestrøm		
2014	Vålerenga	10	(0)

International career
2009	Norway	1	(0)
- * Club domestic league appearances and goals as of 30 August 2014

Nasra Abdullah Reinsberg (born Nasra Badalla Abdullah; 13 July 1985) is a former footballer who played as an attacking midfielder. She competed in the Toppserien for clubs Lillestrøm SK, with whom she has also played the Champions League, and Vålerenga. In addition she played one NCAA season for UAB Blazers.

Born in Kenya, she made her debut with the Norway women's national team on 31 January 2009. In doing so, she became the first immigrant to feature for Norway.

Her brother Mohammed Abdullah has played for Ull/Kisa.
