= 2009–10 UEFA Women's Champions League =

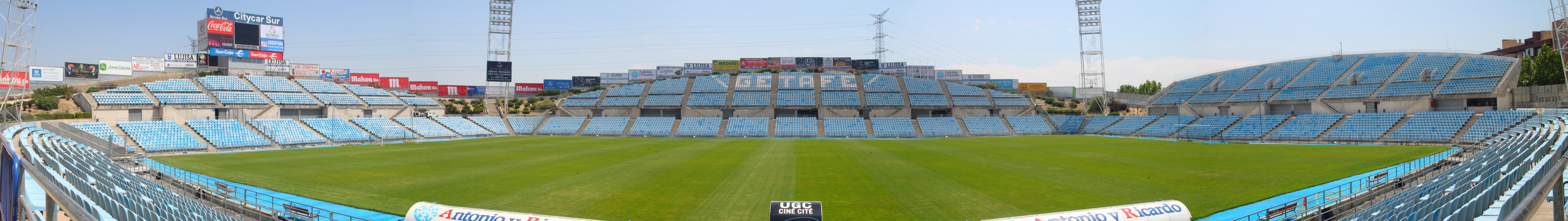
- The Coliseum Alfonso Pérez in Getafe hosted the final.

Tournament details
- Dates: 30 July 2009 – 20 May 2010
- Teams: 53 (from 44 confederations)

Final positions
- Champions: (Germany) Turbine Potsdam (2nd title)
- Runners-up: (France) Lyon

Tournament statistics
- Matches played: 103
- Goals scored: 428 (4.16 per match)
- Top scorer(s): (Switzerland) Vanessa Bürki; 11 goals
- All statistics correct as of 17 March 2010.

The UEFA Women's Champions League 2009–10 was the first edition of the newly branded tournament, and the ninth edition of a UEFA tournament for women's champion football clubs.

For the first time the top 8 leagues of the UEFA were awarded two entry places in this year's season. Germany even got 3 entries, as FCR 2001 Duisburg finished outside the top 2 in Germany's league but gained entry as the title holder.

== Teams ==
Round of 32
| (Germany) Duisburg (TH) | (Germany) Turbine Potsdam (CH) | (Sweden) Umeå (CH) | (England) Arsenal (CH) |
| (France) Lyon (CH) | (Denmark) Fortuna Hjørring (CH) | (Russia) Zvezda 2005 Perm (CH) | (Norway) Røa (CH) |
| (Italy) Bardolino (CH) | (Iceland) Valur (CH) | (Belarus) Universitet Vitebsk (CH) | (Netherlands) AZ (CH) |
| (Spain) Rayo Vallecano (CH) | (Czech Republic) Sparta Praha (CH) | (Austria) Neulengbach (CH) | (Belgium) Standard Liège (CH) |
| (Kazakhstan) Alma (CH) | (Poland) Unia Racibórz (CH) | (Ukraine) Zhytlobud-1 Kharkiv (CH) | (Switzerland) Zürich (CH) |
| (Serbia) Mašinac Niš (CH) | (Greece) PAOK (CH) | (Hungary) Viktória (CH) | (Finland) Honka (CH) |
| (Bosnia and Herzegovina) ZNK-SFK 2000 (CH) | | | |
Qualifying round
| (Germany) Bayern Munich (RU) | (Sweden) Linköping (RU) | (England) Everton (RU) | (France) Montpellier (RU) |
| (Denmark) Brøndby (RU) | (Russia) Rossiyanka (RU) | (Norway) Team Strømmen (RU) | (Italy) Torres (RU) |
| (Moldova) Roma Calfa (CH) | (Israel) Maccabi Holon(CH) | (Romania) CFF Clujana (CH) | (Scotland) Glasgow City (CH) |
| (Portugal) 1° Dezembro (CH) | (Bulgaria) NSA Sofia (CH) | (Slovenia) ŽNK Krka (CH) | (Slovakia) Slovan Duslo Sala (CH) |
| (Wales) Cardiff City (CW) | (Croatia) Osijek (CH) | (Lithuania) Gintra Universitetas (CH) | (North Macedonia) Tikvesanka (CH) |
| (Faroe Islands) KÍ Klaksvík (CH) | (Republic of Ireland) St Francis (CW) | (Northern Ireland) Glentoran (CH) | (Cyprus) Apollon Limassol (CH) |
| (Estonia) Levadia Tallinn (CH) | (Georgia (country)) Norchi Dinamoeli (CH) | (Malta) Birkirkara (CH) | (Turkey) Trabzonspor (CH) |

== Qualifying round ==
The draw was made on 24 June 2009. Teams marked (H) hosted a mini-league. The winners of each group qualified for the next round.

=== Group A ===
| Pos | Team | Pld | W | D | L | GF | GA | GD | Pts | Qualification | BAY | GLA | GIN | NDI |
|---|---|---|---|---|---|---|---|---|---|---|---|---|---|---|
| 1 | (Germany) Bayern Munich | 3 | 3 | 0 | 0 | 32 | 2 | +30 | 9 | Advance to main round | — | 5–2 | – | 19–0 |
| 2 | (Scotland) Glasgow City | 3 | 2 | 0 | 1 | 13 | 5 | +8 | 6 | | – | — | 2–0 | – |
| 3 | (Lithuania) Gintra Universitetas (H) | 3 | 1 | 0 | 2 | 7 | 11 | −4 | 3 | | 0–8 | – | — | 7–1 |
| 4 | (Georgia (country)) Norchi Dinamoeli | 3 | 0 | 0 | 3 | 1 | 35 | −34 | 0 | | – | 0–9 | – | — |

Source: RSSSF
(H) Hosts

=== Group B ===
| Pos | Team | Pld | W | D | L | GF | GA | GD | Pts | Qualification | MH | NSA | KIK | TIK |
|---|---|---|---|---|---|---|---|---|---|---|---|---|---|---|
| 1 | (France) Montpellier | 3 | 3 | 0 | 0 | 12 | 1 | +11 | 9 | Advance to main round | — | – | 2–0 | 7–1 |
| 2 | (Bulgaria) NSA Sofia | 3 | 2 | 0 | 1 | 7 | 4 | +3 | 6 | | 0–3 | — | – | 5–0 |
| 3 | (Faroe Islands) KÍ Klaksvík | 3 | 1 | 0 | 2 | 5 | 6 | −1 | 3 | | – | 1–2 | — | – |
| 4 | (North Macedonia) Tikvesanka (H) | 3 | 0 | 0 | 3 | 3 | 16 | −13 | 0 | | – | – | 2–4 | — |

Source: RSSSF
(H) Hosts

=== Group C ===
| Pos | Team | Pld | W | D | L | GF | GA | GD | Pts | Qualification | BRØ | DEZ | CAR | BIR |
|---|---|---|---|---|---|---|---|---|---|---|---|---|---|---|
| 1 | (Denmark) Brøndby (H) | 3 | 3 | 0 | 0 | 12 | 0 | +12 | 9 | Advance to main round | — | – | 5–0 | 6–0 |
| 2 | (Portugal) 1° Dezembro | 3 | 2 | 0 | 1 | 13 | 1 | +12 | 6 | | 0–1 | — | – | 10–0 |
| 3 | (Wales) Cardiff City | 3 | 1 | 0 | 2 | 10 | 9 | +1 | 3 | | – | 0–3 | — | – |
| 4 | (Malta) Birkirkara | 3 | 0 | 0 | 3 | 1 | 26 | −25 | 0 | | – | – | 1–10 | — |

Source: RSSSF
(H) Hosts

=== Group D ===
| Pos | Team | Pld | W | D | L | GF | GA | GD | Pts | Qualification | TOR | SDŠ | TRA | KRK |
|---|---|---|---|---|---|---|---|---|---|---|---|---|---|---|
| 1 | (Italy) Torres | 3 | 3 | 0 | 0 | 13 | 0 | +13 | 9 | Advance to main round | — | 1–0 | 9–0 | – |
| 2 | (Slovakia) Slovan Duslo Šaľa | 3 | 1 | 1 | 1 | 4 | 4 | 0 | 4 | | – | — | – | 2–2 |
| 3 | (Turkey) Trabzonspor | 3 | 1 | 0 | 2 | 3 | 11 | −8 | 3 | | – | 1–2 | — | – |
| 4 | (Slovenia) ŽNK Krka (H) | 3 | 0 | 1 | 2 | 2 | 7 | −5 | 1 | | 0–3 | – | 0–2 | — |

Source: RSSSF
(H) Hosts

=== Group E ===
| Pos | Team | Pld | W | D | L | GF | GA | GD | Pts | Qualification | LIN | CLU | GLE | RCA |
|---|---|---|---|---|---|---|---|---|---|---|---|---|---|---|
| 1 | (Sweden) Linköping (H) | 3 | 3 | 0 | 0 | 20 | 0 | +20 | 9 | Advance to main round | — | – | 3–0 | 11–0 |
| 2 | (Romania) CFF Clujana | 3 | 2 | 0 | 1 | 10 | 6 | +4 | 6 | | 0–6 | — | 1–0 | – |
| 3 | (Northern Ireland) Glentoran | 3 | 1 | 0 | 2 | 2 | 4 | −2 | 3 | | – | – | — | 2–0 |
| 4 | (Moldova) Roma Calfa | 3 | 0 | 0 | 3 | 0 | 22 | −22 | 0 | | – | 0–9 | – | — |

Source: RSSSF
(H) Hosts

=== Group F ===
| Pos | Team | Pld | W | D | L | GF | GA | GD | Pts | Qualification | ROS | APL | MHO | SFR |
|---|---|---|---|---|---|---|---|---|---|---|---|---|---|---|
| 1 | (Russia) Rossiyanka | 3 | 3 | 0 | 0 | 19 | 0 | +19 | 9 | Advance to main round | — | 1–0 | – | 11–0 |
| 2 | (Cyprus) Apollon Limassol (H) | 3 | 2 | 0 | 1 | 6 | 1 | +5 | 6 | | – | — | – | 2–0 |
| 3 | (Israel) Maccabi Holon | 3 | 1 | 0 | 2 | 2 | 11 | −9 | 3 | | 0–7 | 0–4 | — | – |
| 4 | (Republic of Ireland) St Francis | 3 | 0 | 0 | 3 | 0 | 15 | −15 | 0 | | – | – | 0–2 | — |

Source: RSSSF
(H) Hosts

=== Group G ===
| Pos | Team | Pld | W | D | L | GF | GA | GD | Pts | Qualification | EVE | STR | LTA | OSI |
|---|---|---|---|---|---|---|---|---|---|---|---|---|---|---|
| 1 | (England) Everton | 3 | 3 | 0 | 0 | 11 | 1 | +10 | 9 | Advance to main round | — | – | 7–0 | 3–1 |
| 2 | (Norway) Team Strømmen | 3 | 2 | 0 | 1 | 14 | 1 | +13 | 6 | | 0–1 | — | 5–0 | – |
| 3 | (Estonia) Levadia Tallinn | 3 | 1 | 0 | 2 | 4 | 13 | −9 | 3 | | – | – | — | – |
| 4 | (Croatia) Osijek (H) | 3 | 0 | 0 | 3 | 2 | 16 | −14 | 0 | | – | 0–9 | 4–1 | — |

Source: RSSSF
(H) Hosts

== Knockout phase ==
=== Bracket ===
Round of 32
(Denmark) Fortuna Hjørring | 4 | 1 | 5
(Italy) Bardolino | 0 | 2 | 2
(Serbia) Mašinac Niš | 0 | 0 | 0
(France) Lyon | 1 | 5 | 6
(Poland) Unia Racibórz | 1 | 1 | 2
(Austria) Neulengbach | 3 | 0 | 3
(Italy) Torres | 4 | 2 | 6
(Iceland) Valur | 1 | 1 | 2
(Spain) Rayo Vallecano | 1 | 1 | 2
(Russia) Rossiyanka | 3 | 2 | 5
(Ukraine) Zhytlobud-1 | 0 | 0 | 0
(Sweden) Umeå | 5 | 6 | 11
(Belgium) Standard Liège | 0 | 1 | 1
(France) Montpellier | 0 | 3 | 3
(Hungary) Viktória | 0 | 2 | 2
(Germany) Bayern Munich | 5 | 4 | 9
(Belarus) Universitet Vitebsk | 1 | 3 | 4
(Germany) Duisburg | 5 | 6 | 11
(Switzerland) Zürich | 0 | 0 | 0
(Sweden) Linköping | 2 | 3 | 5
(Kazakhstan) Alma | 1 | 0 | 1
(Czech Republic) Sparta Prague | 0 | 2 | 2
(Greece) PAOK | 0 | 0 | 0
(England) Arsenal | 9 | 9 | 18
(Finland) Honka | 1 | 0 | 1
(Germany) Turbine Potsdam | 8 | 8 | 16
(Netherlands) AZ | 1 | 1 | 2
(Denmark) Brøndby | 2 | 1 | 3
(Norway) Røa | 3 | 0 | 3
(England) Everton | 0 | 2 | 2
(Bosnia and Herzegovina) ZNK-SFK 2000 | 0 | 0 | 0
(Russia) Zvezda 2005 Perm | 3 | 5 | 8

Round of 16
(Denmark) Fortuna Hjørring | 0 | 0 | 0
(France) Lyon | 1 | 5 | 6
(Austria) Neulengbach | 1 | 1 | 2
(Italy) Torres | 4 | 4 | 8
(Russia) Rossiyanka | 0 | 1 | 1
(Sweden) Umeå | 1 | 1 | 2
(France) Montpellier (a.e.t.) | 0 | 1 | 1
(Germany) Bayern Munich | 0 | 0 | 0
(Germany) Duisburg | 1 | 2 | 3
(Sweden) Linköping | 1 | 0 | 1
(Czech Republic) Sparta Prague | 0 | 0 | 0
(England) Arsenal | 3 | 2 | 5
(Germany) Turbine Potsdam | 1 | 4 | 5
(Denmark) Brøndby | 0 | 0 | 0
(Norway) Røa (a) | 0 | 1 | 1
(Russia) Zvezda 2005 Perm | 0 | 1 | 1

Quarter-finals
(France) Lyon | 3 | 0 | 3
(Italy) Torres | 0 | 1 | 1
(Sweden) Umeå (a) | 0 | 2 | 2
(France) Montpellier | 0 | 2 | 2
(Germany) Duisburg | 2 | 2 | 4
(England) Arsenal | 1 | 0 | 1
(Germany) Turbine Potsdam | 5 | 5 | 10
(Norway) Røa | 0 | 0 | 0

Semi-finals
(France) Lyon | 3 | 0 | 3
(Sweden) Umeå | 2 | 0 | 2
(Germany) Duisburg | 1 | 0 | 1(1)
(Germany) Turbine Potsdam (p) | 0 | 1 | 1(3)

Final
(France) Lyon | 0(6)
(Germany) Turbine Potsdam (p) | 0(7)

=== Round of 32 ===
The 16 seeded teams were drawn one opponent each from the pool of 16 unseeded teams. Teams from the same association could not be drawn against each other. The seeded team played the second leg at home. Matches were played on 30 September and 7 October.

| Team 1 | Agg. | Team 2 | 1st leg | 2nd leg |
|---|---|---|---|---|
| Fortuna Hjørring (Denmark) | 5–2 | (Italy) Bardolino | 4–0 | 1–2 |
| Mašinac Niš (Serbia) | 0–6 | (France) Lyon | 0–1 | 0–5 |
| Unia Racibórz (Poland) | 2–3 | (Austria) Neulengbach | 1–3 | 1–0 |
| Torres (Italy) | 6–2 | (Iceland) Valur | 4–1 | 2–1 |
| Rayo Vallecano (Spain) | 2–5 | (Russia) Rossiyanka | 1–3 | 1–2 |
| Zhytlobud-1 Kharkiv (Ukraine) | 0–11 | (Sweden) Umeå | 0–5 | 0–6 |
| Standard Liège (Belgium) | 1–3 | (France) Montpellier | 0–0 | 1–3 |
| Viktória (Hungary) | 2–9 | (Germany) Bayern Munich | 0–5 | 2–4 |
| Universitet Vitebsk (Belarus) | 4–11 | (Germany) Duisburg | 1–5 | 3–6 |
| Zürich (Switzerland) | 0–5 | (Sweden) Linköping | 0–2 | 0–3 |
| Alma (Kazakhstan) | 1–2 | (Czech Republic) Sparta Prague | 1–0 | 0–2 |
| PAOK (Greece) | 0–18 | (England) Arsenal | 0–9 | 0–9 |
| Honka (Finland) | 1–16 | (Germany) Turbine Potsdam | 1–8 | 0–8 |
| AZ (Netherlands) | 2–3 | (Denmark) Brøndby | 1–2 | 1–1 |
| Røa (Norway) | 3–2 | (England) Everton | 3–0 | 0–2 |
| ZNK-SFK 2000 (Bosnia and Herzegovina) | 0–8 | (Russia) Zvezda 2005 Perm | 0–3 | 0–5 |

=== Round of 16 ===
From this round onwards, there was no seeding, and clubs from the same association could be drawn against each other. The drawing for this round was held immediately after the drawing for the round of 32. Therefore, instead of drawing specific teams matches were drawn with the winners playing each other in this round. Matches were played on 4–5 November and 11–12 November.

| Team 1 | Agg. | Team 2 | 1st leg | 2nd leg |
|---|---|---|---|---|
| Fortuna Hjørring (Denmark) | 0–6 | (France) Lyon | 0–1 | 0–5^{1} |
| Neulengbach (Austria) | 2–8 | (Italy) Torres | 1–4 | 1–4 |
| Rossiyanka (Russia) | 1–2 | (Sweden) Umeå | 0–1 | 1–1 |
| Montpellier (France) | 1–0 | (Germany) Bayern Munich | 0–0 | 1–0 (a.e.t.) |
| Duisburg (Germany) | 3–1 | (Sweden) Linköping | 1–1 | 2–0 |
| Sparta Prague (Czech Republic) | 0–5 | (England) Arsenal | 0–3 | 0–2 |
| Turbine Potsdam (Germany) | 5–0 | (Denmark) Brøndby | 1–0 | 4–0 |
| Røa (Norway) | 1–1 (a) | (Russia) Zvezda 2005 Perm | 0–0 | 1–1 |

- ^{1} Lyon originally won their match 5–0, but the UEFA Appeals Body awarded them a 0–3 defeat as they found Lyon guilty of fielding two ineligible players. Five weeks later, the Court of Arbitration for Sport upheld Lyon's appeal and reinstated the original result.

=== Quarter-finals ===
Matches were played on 10 March and 14–17 March.

| Team 1 | Agg. | Team 2 | 1st leg | 2nd leg |
|---|---|---|---|---|
| Lyon (France) | 3–1 | (Italy) Torres | 3–0 | 0–1 |
| Umeå (Sweden) | 2–2 (a) | (France) Montpellier | 0–0 | 2–2 |
| Duisburg (Germany) | 4–1 | (England) Arsenal | 2–1 | 2–0 |
| Turbine Potsdam (Germany) | 10–0 | (Norway) Røa | 5–0 | 5–0 |

=== Semi-finals ===
Matches were played on 10–11 April and 17–18 April 2010.

| Team 1 | Agg. | Team 2 | 1st leg | 2nd leg |
|---|---|---|---|---|
| Lyon (France) | 3–2 | (Sweden) Umeå | 3–2 | 0–0 |
| Duisburg (Germany) | 1–1 (1–3 p) | (Germany) Turbine Potsdam | 1–0 | 0–1 (a.e.t.) |

=== Final ===
20 May 2010
20:30 (CEST)

| Lyon (France) | 0–0 (a.e.t.) | (Germany) Turbine Potsdam |
|---|---|---|
| | Report |
Penalties
| Franco (penalty scored); Dickenmann (penalty scored); Kaci (penalty scored); Henry (penalty missed); Herlovsen (penalty missed); Renard (penalty scored); Simone (penalty scored); Bouhaddi (penalty scored); Thomis (penalty missed) | 6–7 | (penalty missed) Zietz; (penalty scored) Peter; (penalty scored) Odebrecht; (penalty missed) Mittag; (penalty scored) Kerschowski; (penalty scored) Nagasato; (penalty scored) Bajramaj; (penalty scored) Sarholz; (penalty scored) Schmidt |

Coliseum Alfonso Pérez, Getafe
Attendance: 10,372
Referee: Kirsi Heikkinen (Finland)

UEFA Women's Champions League
2009–10 winners

Second title

== Top goalscorers ==
The top goal scorers including qualifying rounds were:

| Rank | Player | Team | Goals |
|---|---|---|---|
| 1 | (Switzerland) Vanessa Bürki | Bayern Munich | 11 |
| 2 | (Sweden) Ida Brännström | Linköping | 10 |
| 3 | (Germany) Inka Grings | Duisburg | 9 |
| 3 | (Scotland) Kim Little | Arsenal | 9 |
| 3 | (Germany) Anja Mittag | Turbine Potsdam | 9 |

== Round dates ==
| Phase | Round | First leg | Second leg |
|---|---|---|---|
| Qualifying round | Group stage | 30 July 2009 – 4 August 2009 | |
| Knockout stage | Round of 32 | 30 September 2009 | 7 October 2009 |
| Knockout stage | Round of 16 | 4 November 2009 | 11 November 2009 |
| Knockout stage | Quarter-final | 10 March 2010 | 17 March 2010 |
| Knockout stage | Semi-final | 10 April or 11 April 2010 | 17 April or 18 April 2010 |
| Knockout stage | Final | 20 May 2010 | |
