= 2008–09 Frauen-Bundesliga =

Frauen-Bundesliga
- Season: 2008–09
- Champions: Turbine Potsdam; 3rd Bundesliga title 3rd German title
- Relegated: Crailsheim; Borussia Friedenstal
- Champions League: Turbine Potsdam; Bayern Munich; Duisburg
- Matches: 132
- Goals: 562 (4.26 per match)
- Top goalscorer: (Germany) Inka Grings (29)
- Biggest home win: 8–0 Frankfurt v Herford, Duisburg v Crailsheim
- Biggest away win: 0–7 Jena v Duisburg
- Highest scoring: 9–2 Hamburg v Bad Neuenahr

The 2008–09 Frauen-Bundesliga is the 19th season of the Frauen-Bundesliga, Germany's premier women's football league. It began on 7 September 2008 and ended on 7 June 2009. Turbine Potsdam won the championship with Bayern Munich coming in second by single goal.

== Final standings ==
Pos	Team	Pld	W	D	L	GF	GA	GD	Pts	Qualification or relegation
1	Turbine Potsdam (C)	22	17	3	2	67	19	+48	54	2009–10 UEFA Champions League round of 32
2	Bayern Munich	22	17	3	2	69	22	+47	54	2009–10 UEFA Champions League qualifying round
3	FCR 2001 Duisburg	22	17	2	3	86	20	+66	53	2009–10 UEFA Champions League round of 32 (Note: FCR 2001 Duisburg won the 2008–09 UEFA Women's Cup therefore qualify for the 2009–10 UEFA Women's Champions League.)
4	1. FFC Frankfurt	22	14	3	5	58	25	+33	45	
5	Essen-Schönebeck	22	9	3	10	46	39	+7	30	
6	Hamburger SV	22	9	2	11	53	49	+4	29	
7	SC Freiburg	22	9	2	11	36	53	−17	29	
8	VfL Wolfsburg	22	8	3	11	53	48	+5	27	
9	FF USV Jena	22	7	2	13	32	56	−24	23	
10	SC 07 Bad Neuenahr	22	5	3	14	26	74	−48	18	
11	HSV Borussia Friedenstal (R)	22	4	2	16	23	79	−56	14	Relegation to 2009–10 2. Bundesliga
12	TSV Crailsheim (R)	22	1	2	19	14	79	−65	5	Relegation to 2009–10 2. Bundesliga

Source: kicker.de
Rules for classification: 1) points; 2) goal difference; 3) number of goals scored.
(C) Champions; (R) Relegated

== Results ==
Home \ Away	NEU	CRA	DUI	ESS	FRA	FRE	BFR	HSV	JEN	FCB	POT	WOF
SC 07 Bad Neuenahr		5–1	0–4	1–1	0–5	3–0	0–4	1–5	2–1	0–2	2–2	0–5
TSV Crailsheim	1–3		0–7	1–4	1–5	0–3	2–2	1–7	0–2	0–3	0–2	1–3
FCR 2001 Duisburg	6–1	8–0		2–3	5–0	5–0	3–1	5–2	3–0	1–2	0–3	4–0
Essen-Schönebeck	8–1	4–0	0–3		1–3	1–2	4–0	4–0	0–3	2–2	1–5	3–1
FFC Frankfurt	1–0	2–0	1–2	2–2		4–1	8–0	5–0	4–1	1–0	1–2	4–2
SC Freiburg	0–2	1–3	0–3	3–2	2–1		3–1	2–2	4–1	1–5	0–1	2–1
HSV Borussia Friedenstal	3–2	2–0	0–6	0–4	0–3	2–1		1–4	3–4	0–5	0–4	1–6
Hamburg	9–2	1–1	3–4	0–1	0–2	0–1	5–1		2–1	0–3	1–3	3–2
FF USV Jena	5–0	1–0	0–7	3–1	1–1	2–1	2–2	2–3		0–2	0–5	1–4
Bayern Munich	8–1	4–1	0–4	2–0	1–0	5–5	7–0	2–1	3–0		2–1	3–3
Turbine Potsdam	3–0	4–0	2–2	4–0	2–2	7–1	3–0	3–1	3–2	0–3		3–0
VfL Wolfsburg	0–0	6–1	2–2	1–0	2–3	2–3	3–0	2–4	6–0	1–5	1–5	

Legend: Blue = home team win; Yellow = draw; Red = away team win.

== Top scorers ==
Rank	Player	Team	Goals
1	(Germany) Inka Grings	Duisburg	29
2	(Germany) Anja Mittag	Turbine Potsdam	21
2	(Germany) Martina Müller	Wolfsburg	21
4	(Austria) Nina Aigner	Bayern Munich	17
5	(Germany) Kerstin Garefrekes	Frankfurt	14
