= Vanessa Bürki =

Swiss footballer (born 1986)

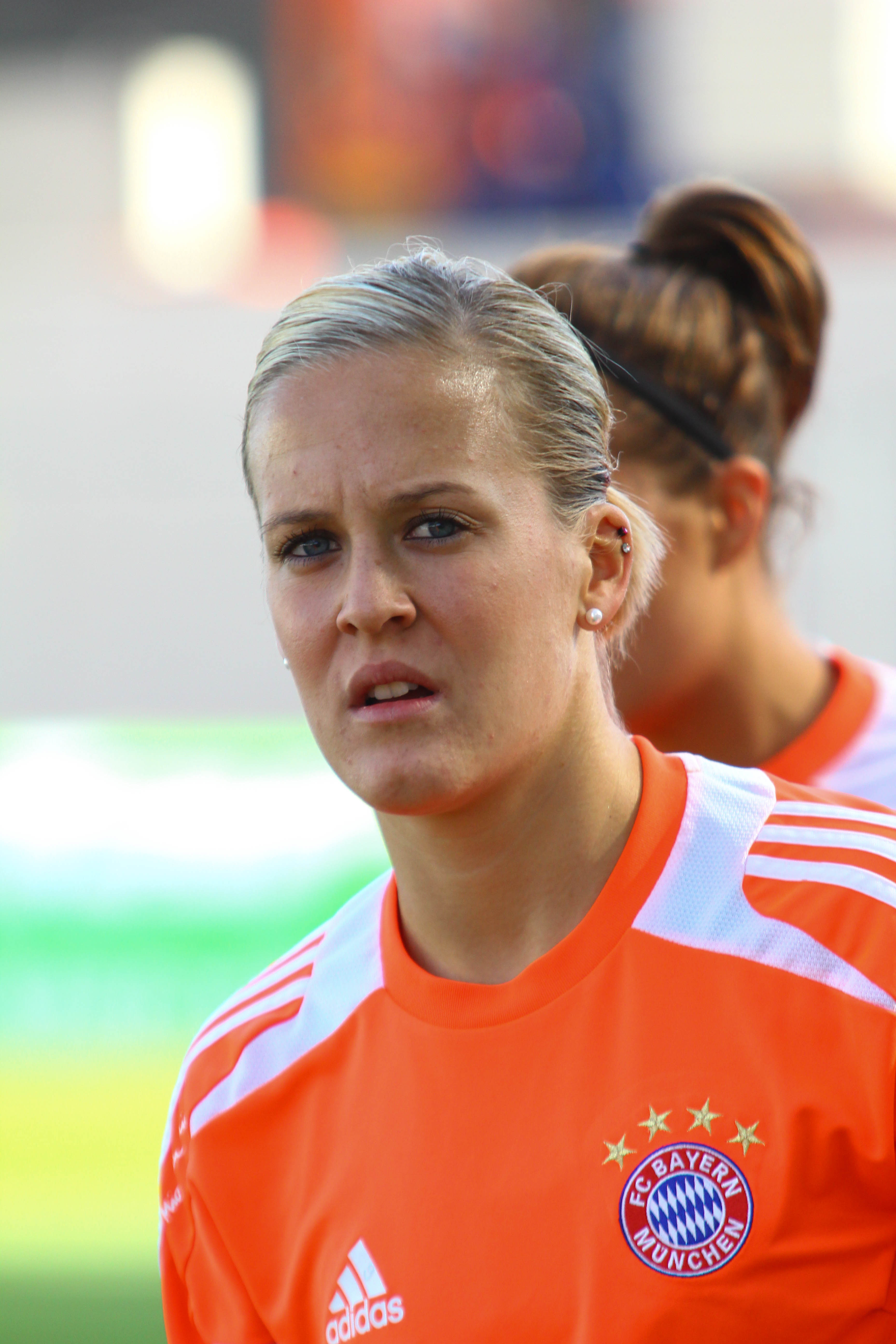
- Bürki in 2012

Personal information
- Full name: Vanessa Bürki
- Date of birth: 1 April 1986 (age 40)
- Place of birth: Grenchen, Switzerland
- Height: 1.68 m (5 ft 6 in)
- Position: Striker

Youth career
- 1998–2001: FC Wacker Grenchen
- 2001–2002: DFC Zuchwil

Senior career*
Years	Team	Apps	(Gls)
2002–2005	DFC Zuchwil		
2005–2006	FFC Zuchwil 05		
2006–2017	Bayern Munich	176	(54)

International career^{‡}
2004–05	Switzerland U–19	7	(5)
2004–2017	Switzerland	79	(10)
- * Club domestic league appearances and goals as of 01:51, 14 January 2018 (UTC) ‡ National team caps and goals as of 01:51, 14 January 2018 (UTC)

Vanessa Bürki (born 1 April 1986) is a Swiss former footballer who played as a striker. She has also been a member of the Swiss national team.

== Club career ==
On 18 April 2016, she extended her contract with FC Bayern Munich until 2018. However, she transferred to BSC YB in 2017.

=== Clubs ===
Bürki started playing football at FC Wacker Grenchen at the age of twelve and stayed until the C Youth level together with boys, before moving to DFC Zuchwil, a women's football club from Zuchwil in the canton of Solothurn, in 2001. For this club she played from 2002 to 2006 (from 19 March 2005 under the name FFC Zuchwil 05) in the National League A, was twice second in the championship, won the Torjägerkanone and was awarded Footballer of the Year. Becoming aware of this, FC Bayern Munich signed her. She made her debut on 10 September 2006 (day 1) in a 4-1 home win over Hamburger SV and crowned it with their first Bundesliga goal, the goal for the final score in the 80th minute. From 18 April to 10 May 2009, on four consecutive matchdays, she scored two goals and on 31 October 2009 (7th matchday), and she even scored four goals in a 6-2 home win over 1. FC Saarbrücken. In 2015 and 2016 she won the German championship with the Munich team. At the end of the 2016/17 season, she said goodbye to FC Bayern Munich after eleven seasons. For the 2017/18 season they committed the Swiss division club BSC YB.

=== National team ===
On 26 March 2003 she made her debut in the U-19 national team, which lost 3-0 to Germany in Sursee.

She took part in the U-19 European Championship in Hungary from 20 to 31 July 2005, and was eliminated after three games in the preliminary round. She scored five out of eight of her team's goals.

She made her U-20 debut on 5 June 2006 in Oberdorf in a 2-1 defeat against Russia. She crowned her second appearance for this national team on 8 June 2006 in Herzogenbuchsee, in a 5-1 victory over Argentina with three goals.

From 17 August to 3 September 2006 she took part in the U-20 World Cup in Russia and played 90 minutes in all three group games. She scored both goals for Switzerland in the first group match on 18 August in the 4-2 defeat by Mexico.

On 22 May 2004 she made her debut in the senior national team, which scored a 0-0 draw in Trapani in the European Championship qualifier against the selection of Italy. She scored her first international goal on 25 February 2006 in Bellinzona in the 2-3 defeat against Denmark with the opening goal to make it 1-0 in the 20th minute.

== Honours ==
=== Club ===
Bayern München

- Bundesliga (2): 2014–15, 2015–16
- DFB-Pokal (1): 2011–12
- Bundesliga Cup (1): 2011
- 2017: Cyprus Cup - Winner
- 2004, 2006: Swiss Vice Champion
- 2009, 2017: German Vice Champion
- 2006: Swiss top scorer

=== Individual ===
She was named Best Swiss Footballer of 2006.
