= DFB-Hallenpokal for women =

The DFB-Hallenpokal for women was an official five-a-side German indoor championship for women's football. The competition was held from 1994 by 2015. Until 2006, the championship was called the "Oddset Cup". The last titleholder was Bayer 04 Leverkusen. Record winner with seven championship cups were 1. FFC Frankfurt and 1. FFC Turbine Potsdam.

== History ==
As the first competition was held it was still an unofficial cup tournament. One year later, the German Football Association (German: Deutscher Fußball-Bund – DFB) made the competition official. The event took place, starting in 2000, in the Hardtberghalle in Bonn. Since 2009 the tournament was held in the GETEC Arena in Magdeburg. Due to the World Cup being held in Germany, the indoor championship was not held in 2011.

The winner received a cash prize of € 5,000. The finalists received € 3,000, while the defeated semi-finalists received € 1,500 each. In addition, each participant received an entry payment of € 10,000.

The winner of the Hallenpokal also won the Bundesliga six times and the DFB-Pokal seven times. DFB-Hallenpokal winners managed to win the double five times. On 15 January 2015, the cup was held in the GETEC Arena in Magdeburg for the last time. As of 2016, the DFB set forth that all the official hall competitions must be played according to the rules of Futsal. This was rejected by the twelve teams of Bundesliga.
