= 2009–10 DFB-Pokal Frauen =

Tournament details
- Country: Germany
- Teams: 57

Final positions
- Champions: FCR 2001 Duisburg
- Runners-up: FF USV Jena

Tournament statistics
- Matches played: 56
- Goals scored: 249 (4.45 per match)

The DFB-Pokal 2009–10 was the 30th season of the cup competition, Germany's second-most important title in women's football. The tournament started on 13 September 2009 and the final was held on 15 May 2010 in Cologne. FCR 2001 Duisburg defeated FF USV Jena 1–0, thus defending their title from the previous season and claiming their third. The final set a European record for the largest attendance of a national women's club game with 26,282 visitors in the RheinEnergieStadion, Cologne.

== Participating clubs ==
The following teams are qualified for the DFB-Pokal:

BUNDESLIGA all clubs of 2008–09	2. BUNDESLIGA; 20 of 24 clubs of 2008–09 (Note: Being second teams FCR 2001 Duisburg II, FFC Frankfurt II, Hamburg II, and Turbine Potsdam II may not compete in the cup.)	REGIONALLIGA; 4 of 5 clubs promoted in 2008–09 (Note: Being a second team Bayern Munich II may not compete in the cup.)	REGIONAL CUPS; Winners of 2008–09
SC 07 Bad Neuenahr TSV Crailsheim FCR 2001 Duisburg Essen-Schönebeck FFC Frankfurt SC Freiburg HSV Borussia Friedenstal Hamburg FF USV Jena Bayern Munich Turbine Potsdam VfL Wolfsburg	Tennis Borussia Berlin Union Berlin SV Dirmingen SV Victoria Gersten FSV Gütersloh 2009 (Note: The women's section of FC Gütersloh 2000 left the club to form an independent women's football club as of 10 June 2009.) ASV Hagsfeld Blau-Weiß Hohen Neuendorf FSV Viktoria Jägersburg Holstein Kiel Bayer Leverkusen Lokomotive Leipzig FV Löchgau SG Lütgendortmund Mellendorfer TV Wacker München FFC Oldesloe 2000: 1. FC Saarbrücken; SC Sand VfL Sindelfingen Wattenscheid 09	Werder Bremen: 1. FC Köln (Note: The promoted Brauweiler Pulheim joined 1. FC Köln as of 1 July 2009.); Magdeburger FFC TuS Wörrstadt	Schleswig-Holstein: TSV Nahe; Hamburg: SC Eilbek; Bremen: ATS Buntentor (Note: Finalist Werder Bremen II may not compete in the cup.); Lower Saxony: TSG Burg Gretesch (Note: Finalist VfL Wolfsburg II may not compete in the cup.); Mecklenburg-Vorpommern: FFV Neubrandenburg; Brandenburg: SV Rot-Weiß Flatow; Berlin: 1. FC Lübars; Saxony-Anhalt: Hallescher FC (Note: Cup winner Magdeburger FFC was promoted to the 2. Bundesliga.); Saxony: Leipziger FC 07; Thuringia: 1. FFV Erfurt (Note: Finalist FF USV Jena II may not compete in the cup.); Middle Rhine: SV Rot-Weiß Merl (Note: Finalist Brauweiler Pulheim was promoted to the 2. Bundesliga.); Lower Rhine: Borussia Mönchengladbach; Westphalia: DJK Eintracht Coesfeld; Rhineland: TuS Ahrbach; South West: 1. FFC 08 Niederkirchen; Saarland: SV Bardenbach; Hesse: TSV Jahn Calden; Württemberg: TSV Ludwigsburg; North Baden: 1899 Hoffenheim; South Baden: Hegauer FV (Note: Finalist SC Freiburg II is not allowed to compete in the cup.); Bavaria: SV 67 Weinberg

== 1st round ==
The top seven clubs from last year's Bundesliga season were automatically qualified for the second round of the cup. These were Turbine Potsdam, Bayern Munich, FCR 2001 Duisburg, FFC Frankfurt, Essen-Schönebeck, Hamburg, and SC Freiburg. The other clubs from the Bundesliga all won their first round match.

12 September 2009; 14:00 CEST
Hallescher FC	0 – 5	Tennis Borussia Berlin
12 September 2009; 15:00 CEST
ATS Buntentor	0 – 8	Werder Bremen
12 September 2009; 16:00 CEST
SV Bardenbach	0 – 4	SC Sand
12 September 2009; 17:30 CEST
SV Rot-Weiß Merl	0 – 11	SC 07 Bad Neuenahr
12 September 2009; 18:00 CEST
FSV Jägersburg	0 – 2	1. FC Saarbrücken
13 September 2009; 11:00 CEST
Mellendorfer TV	2 – 1	SV Victoria Gersten
Borussia Mönchengladbach	0 – 2	FFC Oldesloe
Union Berlin	0 – 10	FSV Gütersloh 2009
1. FC Neubrandenburg 04	2 – 3	SG Lütgendortmund
SV 67 Weinberg	1 – 2	1. FC Köln	(AET)
1. FFV Erfurt	1 – 7	VfL Sindelfingen
SV Dirmingen	1 – 7	FF USV Jena
13 September 2009; 13:00 CEST
DJK Eintracht Coesfeld	3 – 5	Wattenscheid 09
13 September 2009; 14:00 CEST
FC Angeln 02	0 – 9	SV Blau-Weiß Hohen Neuendorf
SC Eilbeck 1913	0 – 4	Holstein Kiel
1. FC Lübars	0 – 1	Lokomotive Leipzig
SV Rot-Weiß Flatow	0 – 13	VfL Wolfsburg
Leipziger FC 07	2 – 3	Herforder SV Borussia Friedenstal
TSG Burg Gretesch	0 – 2	Magdeburger FFC
TSV Ludwigsrburg	1 – 3	TuS Wörrstadt
TuS Ahrbach	0 – 5	TSV Crailsheim
1. FFC 08 Niederkirchen	1 – 3	ASV Hagsfeld
TSV Jahn Calden	0 – 2	Bayer Leverkusen
Hegauer FV	0 – 1	Wacker München	(AET)
13 September 2009; 16:00 CEST
1899 Hoffenheim	2 – 0	FV Löchgau

== 2nd round ==
14 October 2009; 15:00 CEST
SC Freiburg	2 – 0	FC Saarbrücken
16:00 CEST
Magdeburger FFC	1 – 4	Essen-Schönebeck
SC Sand	1 – 5	FF USV Jena
17:00 CEST
Turbine Potsdam	7 – 0	FFC Oldesloe
18:00 CEST
SG Lütgendortmund	1 – 2	Lokomotive Leipzig
18:30 CEST
SV Blau-Weiss Hohen Neuendorf	1 – 4	Werder Bremen
1899 Hoffenheim	0 – 1	VfL Sindelfingen
TSV Crailsheim	2 – 5	1. FC Köln
19:00 CEST
FCR 2001 Duisburg	9 – 0	Herforder SV Borussia Friedenstal
Bayern Munich	2 – 1	Wacker München
19:15 CEST
Wattenscheid 09	2 – 1	ASV Hagsfeld
19:30 CEST
Mellendorfer TV	0 – 5	FSV Gütersloh 2009
VfL Wolfsburg	3 – 0	Hamburg
Bayer Leverkusen	7 – 0	TuS Wörrstadt
15 October 2009; 18:00 CEST
Holstein Kiel	0 – 0	Tennis Borussia Berlin	(4–3 PSO)
19:00 CEST
SC 07 Bad Neuenahr	0 – 4	FFC Frankfurt

== 3rd round ==
14 November 2009; 11:00 CET
FF USV Jena	1 – 0	VfL Sindelfingen
13:00 CET
FFC Frankfurt	6 – 0	SC Freiburg
14:00 CET
Essen-Schönebeck	4 – 0	Lokomotive Leipzig
Werder Bremen	1 – 5	FSV Gütersloh 2009
15 November 2009; 13:00 CET
Bayern Munich	1 – 3	VfL Wolfsburg
14:00 CET
Wattenscheid 09	0 – 4	1. FC Köln
Turbine Potsdam	7 – 0	Holstein Kiel
Bayer Leverkusen	0 – 2	FCR 2001 Duisburg

== Quarter-finals ==
19 December 2009; 13:15 CET
Turbine Potsdam	3 – 0	FFC Frankfurt
20 December 2009; 14:00 CET
VfL Wolfsburg	1 – 2	FF USV Jena
7 February 2010; 14:00 CET
1. FC Köln	0 – 4	FCR 2001 Duisburg
Essen-Schönebeck	1 – 0	FSV Gütersloh 2009

== Semi-finals ==
3 April 2010; 13:15 CEST
FCR 2001 Duisburg	1 – 0	Turbine Potsdam
3 April 2010; 14:00 CEST
FF USV Jena	3 – 0	Essen-Schönebeck

== Final ==
15 May 2010
16:00 (CEST)

FCR 2001 Duisburg	1 – 0	FF USV Jena
Krahn 51'

RheinEnergieStadion (Cologne)
Attendance: 26,282
Referee: Riem Hussein

FCR DUISBURG 2001:
GK	1	(Germany) Ursula Holl
DF	2	(Germany) Luisa Wensing	(substituted off) 90'
DF	10	(Germany) Linda Bresonik
DF	13	(Germany) Annike Krahn
DF	25	(Germany) Alexandra Popp
MF	6	(Germany) Jennifer Oster	(substituted off) 64'
MF	8	(Netherlands) Annemieke Kiesel	(substituted off) 57'
MF	17	(Germany) Marina Hegering
MF	11	(Germany) Simone Laudehr
FW	9	(Germany) Inka Grings
FW	15	(Belgium) Femke Maes
Substitutes:
MF	26	(Japan) Kozue Ando	(substituted in) 57'
FW	7	(Germany) Turid Knaak	(substituted in) 64'
DF	21	(Germany) Marina Himmighofen	(substituted in) 90'
Manager:
(Germany) Martina Voss

FF USV JENA:
GK	(Germany) Jana Burmeister
DF	(Germany) Anna Höfer	Booked
DF	(Germany) Kathleen Radtke	Booked
DF	(Germany) Julia Arnold
DF	(Germany) Stephanie Milde
MF	(Germany) Lisa Seiler		(substituted off) 69'
MF	(Cameroon) Marlyse Ngo Ndoumbouk	Booked
MF	(Germany) Susann Utes
MF	(Germany) Ivonne Hartmann
FW	(Equatorial Guinea) Genoveva Añonma
FW	(Germany) Sylvia Arnold
Substitutes:
FW	(Germany) Sabrina Schmutzler		(substituted in) 69'
Manager:
(Germany) Heidi Vater

MATCH RULES

- 90 minutes.
- 30 minutes of extra-time if necessary, except in the final.
- Penalty shootout if scores still level.
- Seven named substitutes
- Maximum of 3 substitutions.
