= Bielefelder Alm =

Football stadium in Germany

SchücoArena
- Bielefelder Alm

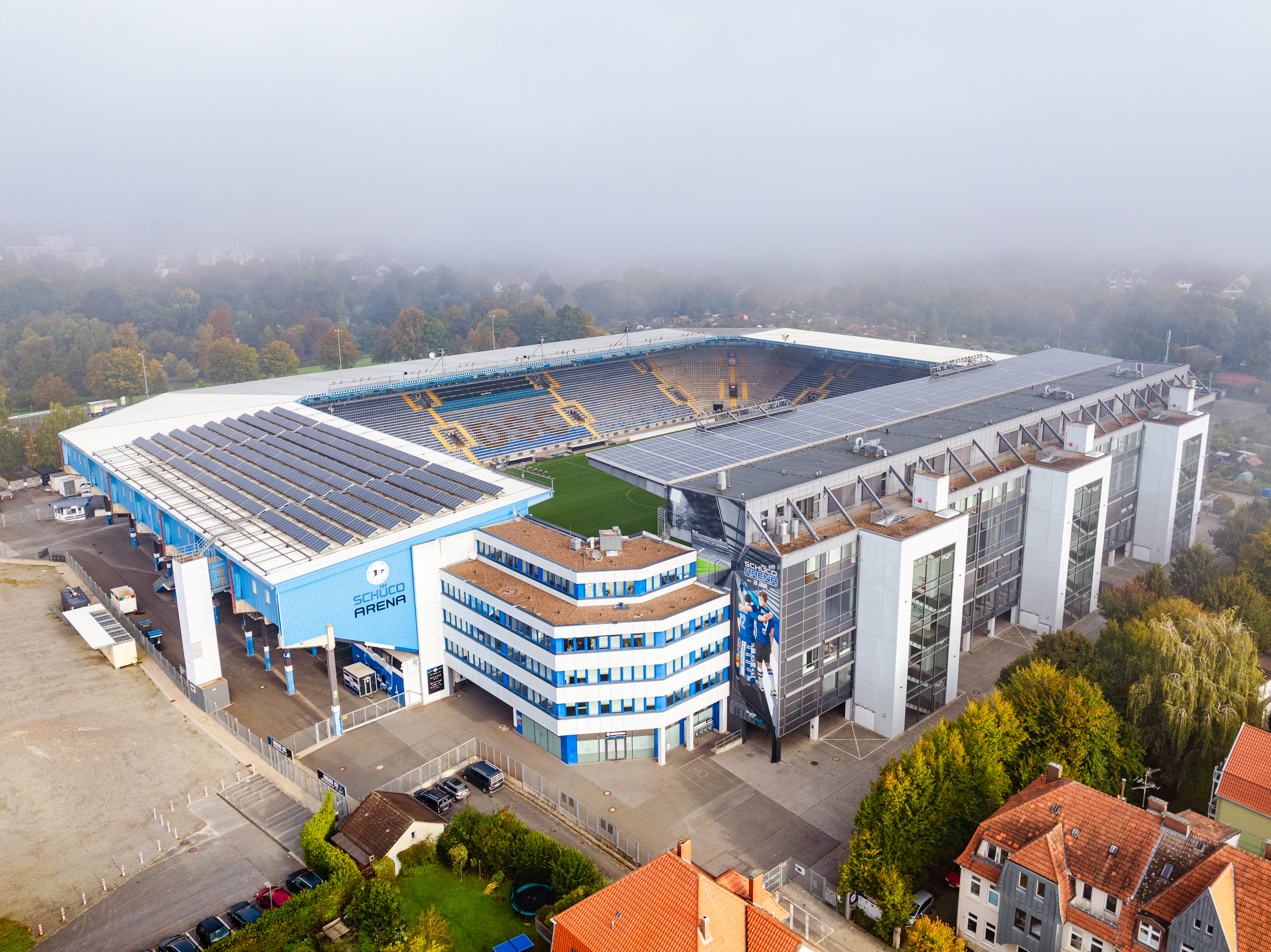
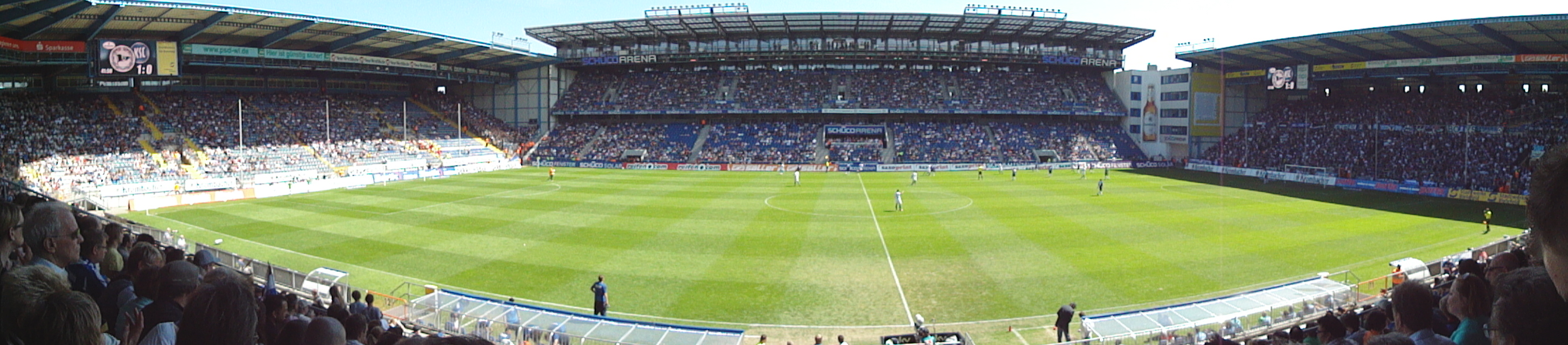
- Aerial View
- Interactive map of SchücoArena
- Full name: Bielefelder Alm
- Former names: Stadion Alm
- Location: Bielefeld, Germany
- Coordinates: 52°01′55″N 8°31′00″E
- Owner: Arminia Bielefeld
- Capacity: 27,332
- Field size: 105m x 68m

Construction
- Built: 1926
- Opened: 1 May 1926
- Renovated: 1996–2008

Tenants
- Arminia Bielefeld (1926–present); Germany women's national football team (selected matches)

Bielefelder Alm (German pronunciation: [ˈbiːləfɛldɐ ˈʔalm]) is a football stadium in Bielefeld, Germany which is home of the football club DSC Arminia Bielefeld and mostly used for the club's matches. Formerly named Stadion Alm [ˈʃtaːdi̯ɔn ˈʔalm], it is currently known as SchücoArena [ˈʃyːkoːʔaˈʁeːnaː] due to a sponsorship deal with the Bielefeld-based window, door, and façade manufacturers. The stadium currently has a capacity of 27,332 following the most recent major renovations completed in 2008. Alm means mountain pasture, or simply pasture, in German. Various legends exist relating to the initial conditions of the stadium and pitch which gave the Alm its name.

== History ==
=== Origin and Early Years (1926-1970) ===
Arminia Bielefeld utilized a variety of locations around the city to play home matches since their founding in 1905. The first Arminia matches took place at the Kaiser-Wilhelm-Platz, the present day Kesselbrink, in Bielefeld. Thereafter, the club briefly played at a ground off of the former Kaiser Street, or Kaiserstraße in German, currently known as August Bebel Street. In 1910 the club moved to a new ground known as the Pottenau Sportplatz. The Pottenau ground was intended for 4,000 spectators, but a few thousand additional spectators were able to view matches without paying admission on the adjacent railway embankment.

Following the Arminia's 1922 and 1923 West German Football Championship titles, the club had outgrown the Pottenau ground, but did not have the financial resources to expand. In the mid-1920s, members of the club's Handball department made contact with a local farmer by the last name of Lohmann. The club and Lohmann agreed to a 100 year lease of the property which would become Arminia's home ground. The first match played at the ground took place on 1 May 1926 between Arminia and Victoria Hamburg. Roughly 2,000 spectators attended the inaugural match which Hamburg won 5:1.

The new ground was initially referred to as the Stadion an der Melanchthonstraße. The exact origin of the Alm name is the subject of various legends. The word Alm in German means mountain pasture. The most well supported theory for the origin of the name came from club member Heinrich Pehle. In the early years of the ground, Pehle said, "It looks like [a] pasture here!", referring to the poor quality and uneven surface of the pitch. The grass coverage was sparse and puddles covered the entire pitch during the Alm's early years in the late 1920s. An alternative origination of the Alm name came from former player and club director Karl Demberg, who said, "Let [our opponents] come, we will make them fold on our pasture!" Engelbert Strauch claimed that, per the terms of the lease, Lohmann's cattle could still graze on the pitch while matches were not being played, thus giving the Alm its name. Arminia Bielefeld considers the Pehle quote as the most plausible origination of the Alm name.

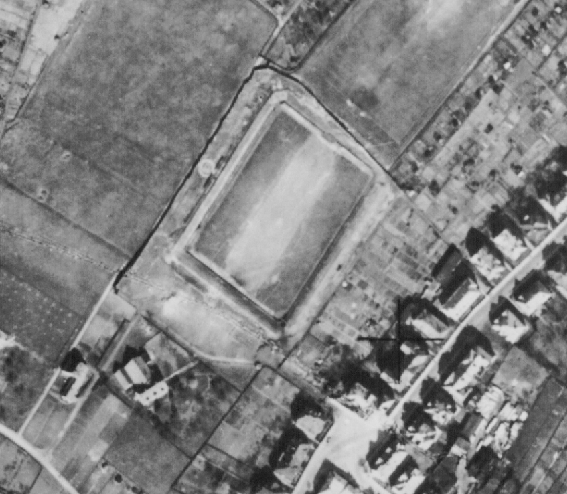
Aerial image of the Bielefelder Alm in 1939.

The Alm did not have any facilities or changing rooms for the players or match officials in its early years. Nearby pub on Stapenhorststraße known as Schutze provided changing rooms and showers for the squads. Named after proprietors Else and Wilhelm Schütze, the pub was later renamed to Haus Wiegand after later owner Günter Wiegand. Only one cold water shower was available for players and match officials. The pub was used as the ground's changing room until the 1960s. In 1983 the pub was renamed Tinneff after Arminia's 1920s championship left winger Walter "Tinneff" Röhe, a regular at the pub. The original pub building was damaged by a fire in 2007 and the pub did not reopen thereafter. The building was demolished in 2015 for the construction of a new multi-use property.

Space for up to 20,000 spectators was provided by a manmade mound surrounding the pitch. The ground remained unchanged from its initial configuration for roughly three decades. In 1954, the city of Bielefeld undertook a number of modifications to modernize the ground, including the purchase of adjacent properties for the development of two alternate pitches, as well as the construction of concrete terracing. In addition, the playing surface conditions were improved by the installation of a grass pitch.

=== Expansion for the Bundesliga (1970-1996) ===
In the 1960s the club played in the Regionalliga West, the second tier of German football. Halfway through the 1966-67 Regionalliga season, Bielefeld was at the top of the table. Rumors arose in the local media that, should Bielefeld be promoted to the Bundesliga, the Alm would not be suitable for the first tier. In the event of promotion, the club would need to play its home matches in the Friedrich-Ludwig-Jahn-Stadion in nearby Herford.

Following Bielefeld's promotion to the Bundesliga in 1970, the club began further renovations to the Alm. A new southern stand was constructed, a main stand was built on the west side of the ground, and steel frame stands were erected on the northern and eastern sides. Following these additions, the grounds capacity was over 30,000. Floodlights were added for the first time in the grounds history as well. 29,000 spectators witnessed a 1:1 draw between Arminia and Hertha BSC Berlin in the stadiums first ever night match, with goals being scored by Gerd Kohl and Zoltán Varga.

The ground was expanded to a capacity of 35,000 following Bielefeld's return to the Bundesliga in 1978 with the addition of a steel frame stand on the north end of the ground. The newly expanded ground was renowned during the season for the particularly hostile atmosphere created by fans against visiting teams. The first match in the newly expanded ground was against local North Rhine-Westphalian club Schalke 04, and had an attendance of 34,882 spectators. The near capacity crowd witnessed a 3:2 victory for Arminia with Bielefeld's goals scored by Christian Sackewitz, Norbert Eilenfeldt, and Hans-Werner Moors.

=== Rebuilding (1996-2008) ===
In 1996 rebuilding work began, first the North Stand was rebuilt and then the West Stand, bringing capacity to 22,512. In 1999 the South Stand was rebuilt increasing capacity to 26,601, and in June 2007 the capacity reached 28,008 following completion of the East Stand. The East Stand features a state-of-the-art glass roof that contains photo voltaic elements built into the glass (as opposed to mounted on it) that generate electricity for the club.

=== Recent History and Sale (Since 2008) ===
The construction costs of the new Haupttribune rising from the planned 11 million to 19 million euros was a significant contributor to Arminia's near bankruptcy around 2010. In November 2018, Arminia Bielefeld announced the sale of the stadium to "3BO GmbH" and "STBO GmbH" (each 50 percent) in order to improve the club's financial situation. Shareholders include Dr. August Oetker KG and Gauselmann AG. However, the club will retain all rights such as rental incomes and naming rights.

Schüco Arena is included in the video game Pro Evolution Soccer 2008, due to lack of licensing rights appearing as "Blautraum Arena". It is also in FIFA 22 and FIFA 23, as part of the Bundesliga licensing deal with EA Sports.

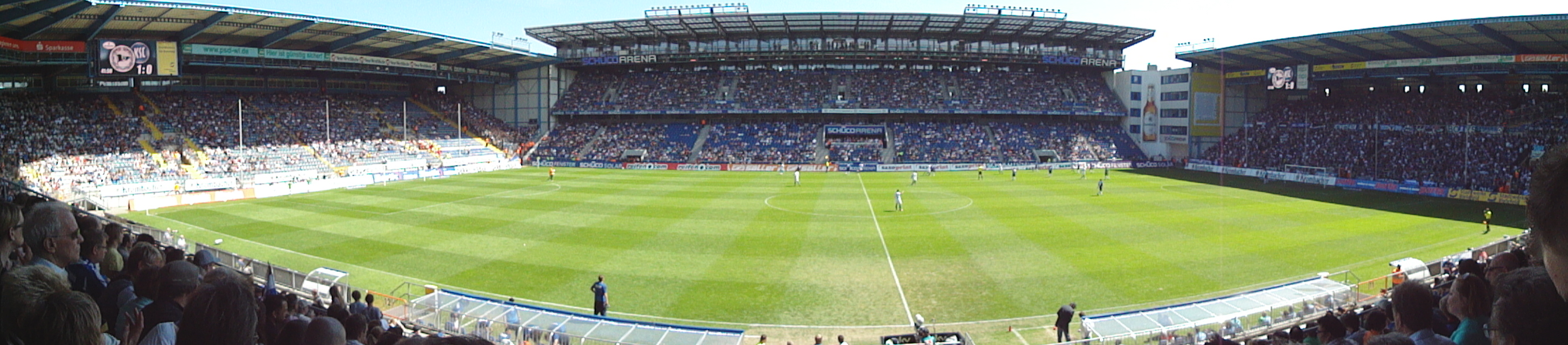
The SchücoArena viewed from the West Stand during the 8 May 2011 match between Arminia Bielefeld – Karlsruher SC

== Other uses ==
=== 2010 FIFA U-20 Women's World Cup ===
In 2008 FIFA and the German Football Association announced the nine host cities for the 2011 FIFA Women's World Cup. Bielefeld had applied to be one of the host cities for the tournament, however, Leverkusen was selected in lieu of Bielefeld. Following Bielefeld's rejected application to host matches during the 2011 tournament, DFB Executive Theo Zwanziger committed that Bielefeld would be invited to host matches of the Germany women's national football team in the future. The Alm was selected to host several matches of the 2010 FIFA U-20 Women's World Cup, including a semifinal, the third place match, and the final.

==== Group Stage ====
13 July 2010	Brazil	0–1	North Korea	Bielefelder Alm
11:30		Report	Ho Un-byol 69'	Attendance: 10,065; Referee: Saša Ihringová (England)

13 July 2010	Sweden	2–1	New Zealand	Bielefelder Alm
14:30	Göransson 56', 67'	Report	Wilkinson 33'	Attendance: 10,065; Referee: Carol Anne Chenard (Canada)

16 July 2010	Brazil	1–1	Sweden	Bielefelder Alm
15:00	Rafaelle 53' (pen.)	Report	Göransson 36'	Attendance: 6,630; Referee: Hong Eun-ah (Korea Republic)

16 July 2010	North Korea	2–1	New Zealand	Bielefelder Alm
18:00	Yun Hyon-hi 12'; Kim Un-Hyang 65' (pen.)	Report	Armstrong 90'	Attendance: 6,630; Referee: Mercy Tagoe (Ghana)

21 July 2010	Japan	3–1	England	Bielefelder Alm
15:00	Nakajima 20'; Kishikawa 74', 78'	Report	Duggan 83' (pen.)	Attendance: 5,420; Referee: Mercy Tagoe (Ghana)

21 July 2010	South Korea	0–1	United States	Bielefelder Alm
18:00		Report	Leroux 21'	Attendance: 5,420; Referee: Bibiana Steinhaus (Germany)

==== Quarterfinal ====
24 July 2010	Sweden	0–2	Colombia	Bielefelder Alm
11:30		Report	Rincón 11'; Ariza 22'	Attendance: 4,735; Referee: Hong Eun-ah (Korea Republic)

==== Semifinal ====
29 July 2010	Colombia	0–1	Nigeria	Bielefelder Alm
18:30		Report	Orji 2'	Attendance: 7,040; Referee: Christina Pedersen (Norway)

==== 3rd Place Playoff ====
1 August 2010	South Korea	1–0	Colombia	Bielefelder Alm
12:00	Ji So-yun 49'	Report		Attendance: 24,633; Referee: Bibiana Steinhaus (Germany)

==== Final ====
1 August 2010	Germany	2–0	Nigeria	Bielefelder Alm
15:00	Popp 8'; Ohale 90+2' (o.g.)	Report		Attendance: 24,633; Referee: Carol Anne Chenard (Canada)

=== DFB Pokal Matches ===
Individual first round matches of the DFB Pokal not involving Arminia have taken place in the Alm. Local clubs without the capacity or infrastructure to host a cup match in their home stadiums have used the Alm as an alternate ground. Both SC Paderborn and VfB Fichte Bielefeld have played first round cup matches at the Alm.

==== 2001-02 DFB Pokal ====
27 August 2001	SC Paderborn	1–5	Bayern Munich	Bielefelder Alm
20:30	Karpowicz 89'	Report (in German)	Jancker 6'; Santa Cruz 23'; Zickler 51', 71'; N. Kovač 65'	Attendance: 24,000; Referee: Jürgen Aust (Cologne)

==== 2008-09 DFB Pokal ====
9 August 2008	VfB Fichte Bielefeld	1–8	Borussia Mönchengladbach	Bielefelder Alm
15:30	Önen 66'	Report (in German)	Marin 7', 11', 17' (pen.); Colautti 9', 24'; Rösler 19', 54'; Brouwers 36'	Attendance: 8,100; Referee: Babak Rafiti (Hannover)

=== 2019-20 Regionalliga Promotion Playoff ===
During the COVID-19 pandemic, an outbreak and subsequent lockdown in Gütersloh prohibited SC Verl from playing the home leg of the 2019-20 Regionalliga promotion playoff at their home ground, the Sportclub Arena. After a 2:2 draw away to Lok Leipzig from the Regionalliga Nordost, Verl drew 1:1 at the Alm and was promoted to the 3. Liga due to the away goals rule.

==== Second Leg ====
30 June 2020	SC Verl	1–1	1. FC Lokomotive Leipzig	Bielefelder Alm
16:00	Schallenberg 73'	Report	Stöckner 45' (o.g.)	Attendance: 0 Referee: Arne Aarnink (Nordhorn)

== Records ==
The highest attendance recorded at the Bielefelder Alm is 36,000 set on 11 November 1978 against 1. FC Kaiserslautern. The highest seasonal average attendance was 26,550 during the 1978-79 Bundesliga, while the lowest recorded average attendance (Note: Seasonal attendance averages are not available for all seasons until the 1966-67 season.) was 2,320 during the 1990-91 Oberliga Westfalen. The since 2004 official SchücoArena name is the third longest running sponsored football ground name in Germany, behind BayArena and Volkswagen Arena.

On 23 March 2024, the Westphalian Cup record attendance of 18,173 was set at the Alm in the semifinal between Arminia and Preußen Münster. The prior record attendance for the competition of 11,778 was also set at the Alm, between the same two sides in the 2011-12 Westphalian Cup final.

== Transport ==
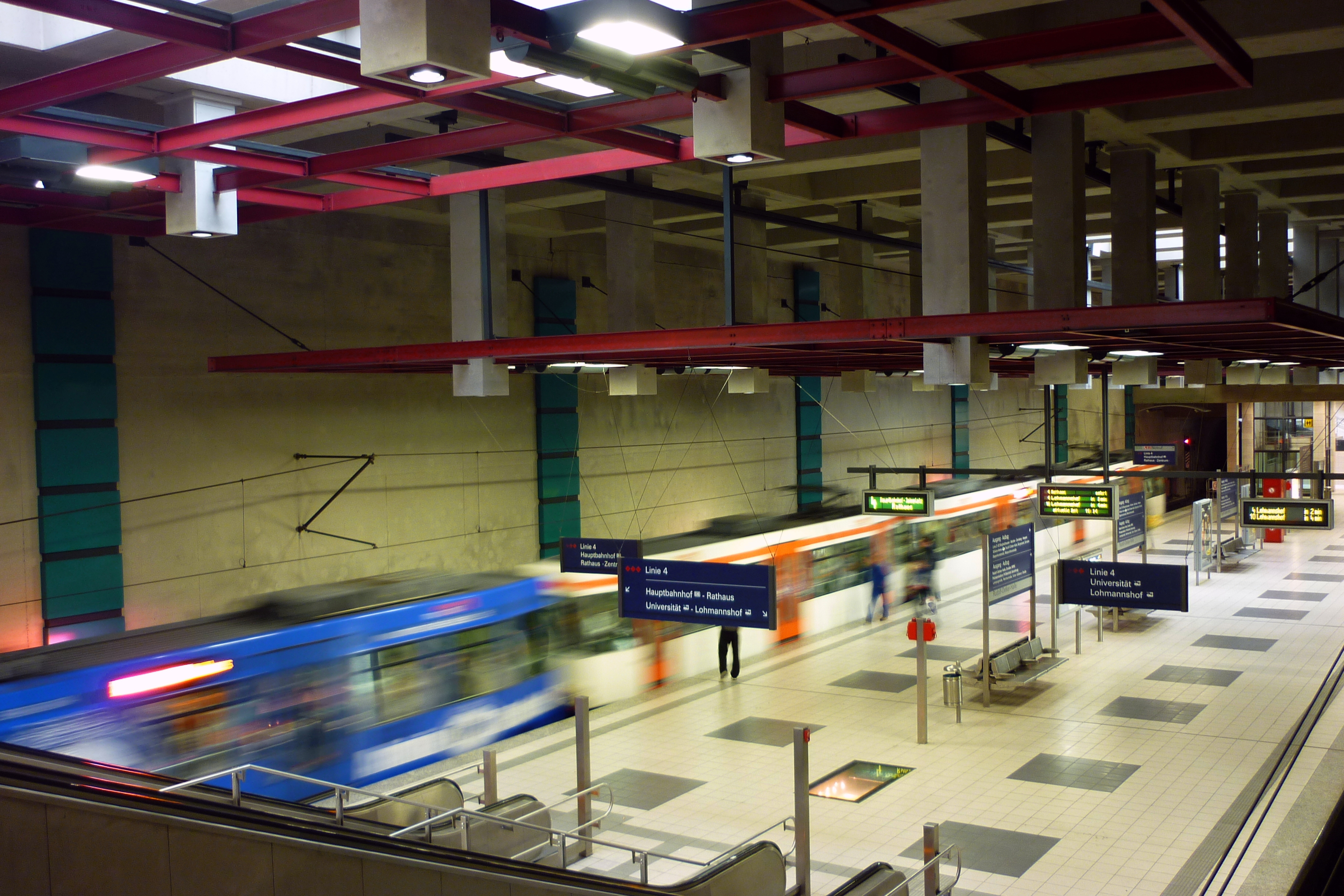
The Rudolf-Oetker-Halle underground station serves the Alm.

The stadium is directly served by bus and the Bielefeld Stadtbahn light rail operated by moBiel, the Bielefeld city public transport agency. Bielefeld Stadtbahn Line 4 stop Rudolf-Oetker-Halle is nearest the stadium and recommended for individuals seated on the southern and eastern stands. Stop Graf-von-Stauffenberg-Straße is recommended for those seated on the western and northern stands. Away fans are recommended to use Line 3 stops Wittekindstraße or Nordpark.

The Bielefeld Central Station is served by regional and intercity trains of the Deutsche Bahn. All Bielefeld light rail lines, including Line 3 and 4, stop underground adjacent to the station. The Jahnplatz, Bielefeld's city center and bus hub with the same name, is also served by all light rail lines. Light rail trips from the Jahnplatz to the stops near the stadium take approximately 4 minutes, whereas trips from the Central Station take approximately 2 minutes. All Bielefeld light rail lines travel via both the Jahnplatz and Central Station stops.

Since the 2016/17 season, all Arminia single match and season tickets are valid public transport tickets throughout the local bus, light rail and limited regional rail services. Ticket holders may travel on public transit without paying an additional fare up to three hours before kickoff until three hours after the end of the match.

Stadium parking is provided at Bielefeld University. Bielefeld Stadtbahn line 4 provides transportation from the University to the stadium. 310 monitored bicycle parking spaces are provided adjacent to the south stand at the Schotterplatz.

== See also ==
- List of football stadiums in Germany
- Lists of stadiums

Preceded by Estadio Bicentenario Municipal; La Florida	FIFA U-20 Women's World Cup; Final Venue; 2010	Succeeded by National Olympic Stadium; Tokyo
