= 2010 FIFA U-20 Women's World Cup =

U-20-Fußball-Weltmeisterschaft der Frauen Deutschland 2010

Tournament details
- Host country: Germany
- Dates: 13 July – 1 August
- Teams: 16 (from 6 confederations)
- Venues: 4 (in 4 host cities)

Final positions
- Champions: Germany (2nd title)
- Runners-up: Nigeria
- Third place: South Korea
- Fourth place: Colombia

Tournament statistics
- Matches played: 32
- Goals scored: 99 (3.09 per match)
- Attendance: 373,800 (11,681 per match)
- Top scorer(s): (Germany) Alexandra Popp (10 goals)
- Best player: (Germany) Alexandra Popp
- Best goalkeeper: (United States) Bianca Henninger
- Fair play award: South Korea

The 2010 FIFA U-20 Women's World Cup was the 5th edition of the tournament. It was held in Germany, who also hosted the 2011 FIFA Women's World Cup a year later, from 13 July to 1 August 2010. Sixteen teams, comprising representatives from all six confederations, were taking part in the final competition, in which Germany had a guaranteed place as the host nation.

== Venues ==
Augsburg	Bielefeld	Bochum	Dresden
Impuls Arena	Bielefelder Alm	Ruhrstadion	Rudolf-Harbig-Stadion
48°19′21.00″N 10°52′56.00″E	52°01′53.00″N 08°31′01.00″E	51°29′23.57″N 07°14′11.56″E	51°02′25.00″N 13°44′52.00″E
Capacity: 30,120	Capacity: 27,300	Capacity: 31,328	Capacity: 32,066
2010 FIFA U-20 Women's World Cup is located in Germany

== Qualified teams ==
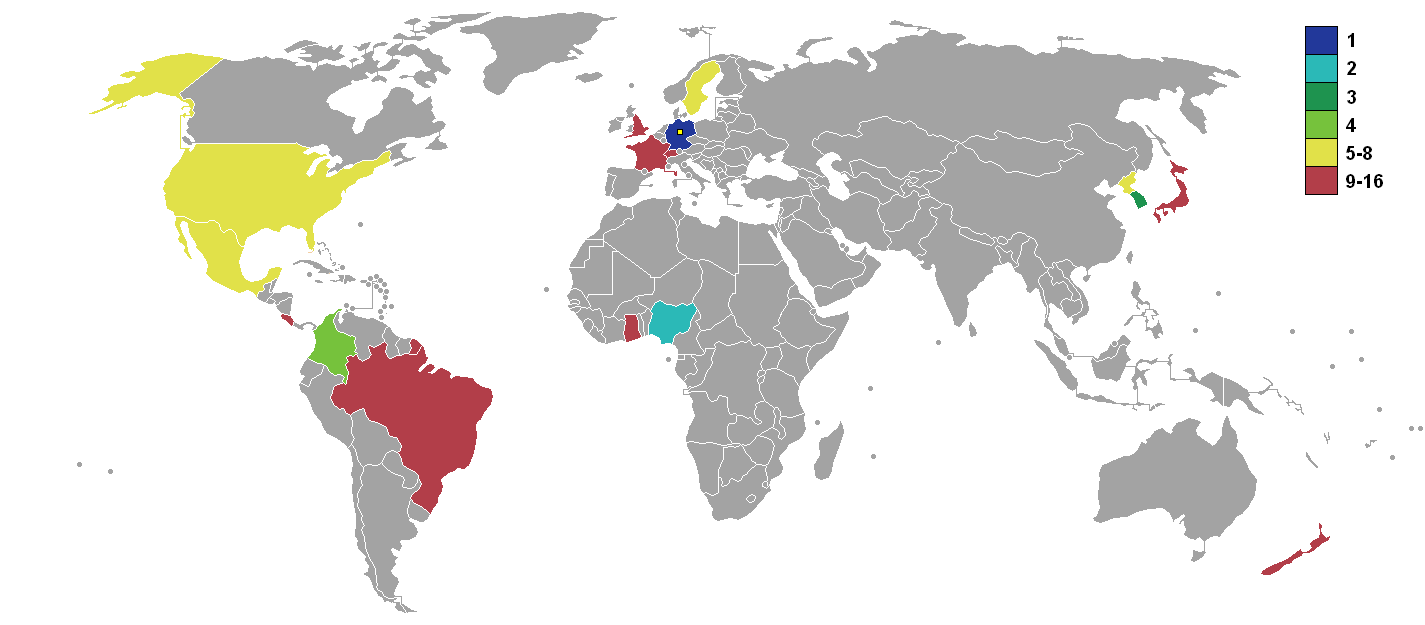
Final rankings of the teams

Confederation (Continent)	Qualifying Tournament	Qualifier(s)
AFC (Asia)	2009 AFC U-19 Women's Championship	North Korea; South Korea; Japan
CAF (Africa)	2010 African U-20 Women's World Cup Qualifying Tournament	Ghana^{1} Nigeria
CONCACAF (North, Central America & Caribbean)	2010 CONCACAF Women's U-20 Championship	United States; Mexico; Costa Rica^{1}
CONMEBOL (South America)	2010 South American U-20 Women's Championship	Brazil; Colombia^{1}
OFC (Oceania)	2010 OFC Women's U-20 Championship	New Zealand
UEFA (Europe)	Host nation	Germany
UEFA (Europe)	2009 UEFA Women's Under-19 Championship	England; Sweden^{1} France; Switzerland

1.Teams that made their debut.

=== Nigerian team ban ===
On 30 June 2010, President of Nigeria Goodluck Jonathan announced he would suspend the Nigeria Football Federation from FIFA competition for 2 years. This put the Falconets place at the competition in jeopardy. On 5 July 2010, the ban was lifted.

== Final draw ==
No two teams from the same confederation were to be drawn in the same group, with the exception of Group A, which would include two European teams.

Pot 1	Pot 2	Pot 3	Pot 4
Germany (A1); Japan; United States; Brazil	South Korea; North Korea; Costa Rica; Mexico	Nigeria; Ghana; New Zealand; Colombia	England; France; Sweden; Switzerland

== Group stage ==
The ranking of each team in each group was determined as follows:

- greatest number of points obtained in all group matches;
- goal difference in all group matches;
- greatest number of goals scored in all group matches.

If two or more teams are equal on the basis of the above three criteria, their rankings will be determined as follows:

- greatest number of points obtained in the group matches between the teams concerned;
- goal difference resulting from the group matches between the teams concerned;
- greater number of goals scored in all group matches between the teams concerned;
- drawing of lots by the FIFA Organising Committee.

It has been decided by FIFA to remove the use of the fair play point system as an option to determine the ranking of teams at the conclusion of the group phase (art. 25 par. 5g).

=== Group A ===
Team	Pld	W	D	L	GF	GA	GD	Pts
Germany	3	3	0	0	11	4	+7	9
Colombia	3	1	1	1	5	4	+1	4
France	3	1	1	1	4	5	−1	4
Costa Rica	3	0	0	3	2	9	−7	0

13 July 2010
11:30

Germany	4–2	Costa Rica
Huth 2'; Popp 16', 53'; Hegering 57'	Report	Venegas 45+1'; Alvarado 72' (pen.)

Ruhrstadion, Bochum
Attendance: 23,995
Referee: Hong Eun-ah (Korea Republic)

13 July 2010
14:30

Colombia	1–1	France
Andrade 86'	Report	Makanza 16'

Ruhrstadion, Bochum
Attendance: 2,500
Referee: Etsuko Fukano (Japan)

16 July 2010
15:00

Costa Rica	0–2	France
	Report	Makanza 67', 83'

Ruhrstadion, Bochum
Attendance: 15,545
Referee: Dagmar Damková (Czech Republic)

16 July 2010
18:00

Germany	3–1	Colombia
Popp 21'; Arnold 50'; Hegering 55'	Report	Ortiz 82'

Ruhrstadion, Bochum
Attendance: 15,545
Referee: Carol Anne Chenard (Canada)

20 July 2010
11:30

France	1–4	Germany
Crammer 48'	Report	Popp 10', 35', 60'; Marozsán 73'

Impuls Arena, Augsburg
Attendance: 26,273
Referee: Saša Ihringová (England)

20 July 2010
11:30

Costa Rica	0–3	Colombia
	Report	D. Montoya 24', 40'; Rincón 90+3' (pen.)

Rudolf-Harbig-Stadion, Dresden
Attendance: 12,863
Referee: Cristina Dorcioman (Romania)

=== Group B ===
Team	Pld	W	D	L	GF	GA	GD	Pts
Sweden	3	2	1	0	6	4	+2	7
North Korea	3	2	0	1	5	4	+1	6
Brazil	3	1	1	1	5	3	+2	4
New Zealand	3	0	0	3	3	8	−5	0

13 July 2010
11:30

Brazil	0–1	North Korea
	Report	Ho Un-byol 69'

Bielefelder Alm, Bielefeld
Attendance: 10,065
Referee: Saša Ihringová (England)

13 July 2010
14:30

Sweden	2–1	New Zealand
Göransson 56', 67'	Report	Wilkinson 33'

Bielefelder Alm, Bielefeld
Attendance: 10,065
Referee: Carol Anne Chenard (Canada)

16 July 2010
15:00

Brazil	1–1	Sweden
Rafaelle 53' (pen.)	Report	Göransson 36'

Bielefelder Alm, Bielefeld
Attendance: 6,630
Referee: Hong Eun-ah (Korea Republic)

16 July 2010
18:00

North Korea	2–1	New Zealand
Yun Hyon-hi 12'; Kim Un-hyang 65' (pen.)	Report	Armstrong 90'

Bielefelder Alm, Bielefeld
Attendance: 6,630
Referee: Mercy Tagoe (Ghana)

20 July 2010
14:30

New Zealand	1–4	Brazil
White 89'	Report	Ludmila 25'; Leah 59'; Débora 87', 90'

Rudolf-Harbig-Stadion, Dresden
Attendance: 12,863
Referee: Dagmar Damková (Czech Republic)

20 July 2010
14:30

North Korea	2–3	Sweden
Kim Myong-gum 26'; Jon Myong-hwa 62'	Report	Jakobsson 43'; Göransson 52'; Hyon Un-hui 75' (o.g.)

Impuls Arena, Augsburg
Attendance: 26,273
Referee: Carol Anne Chenard (Canada)

=== Group C ===
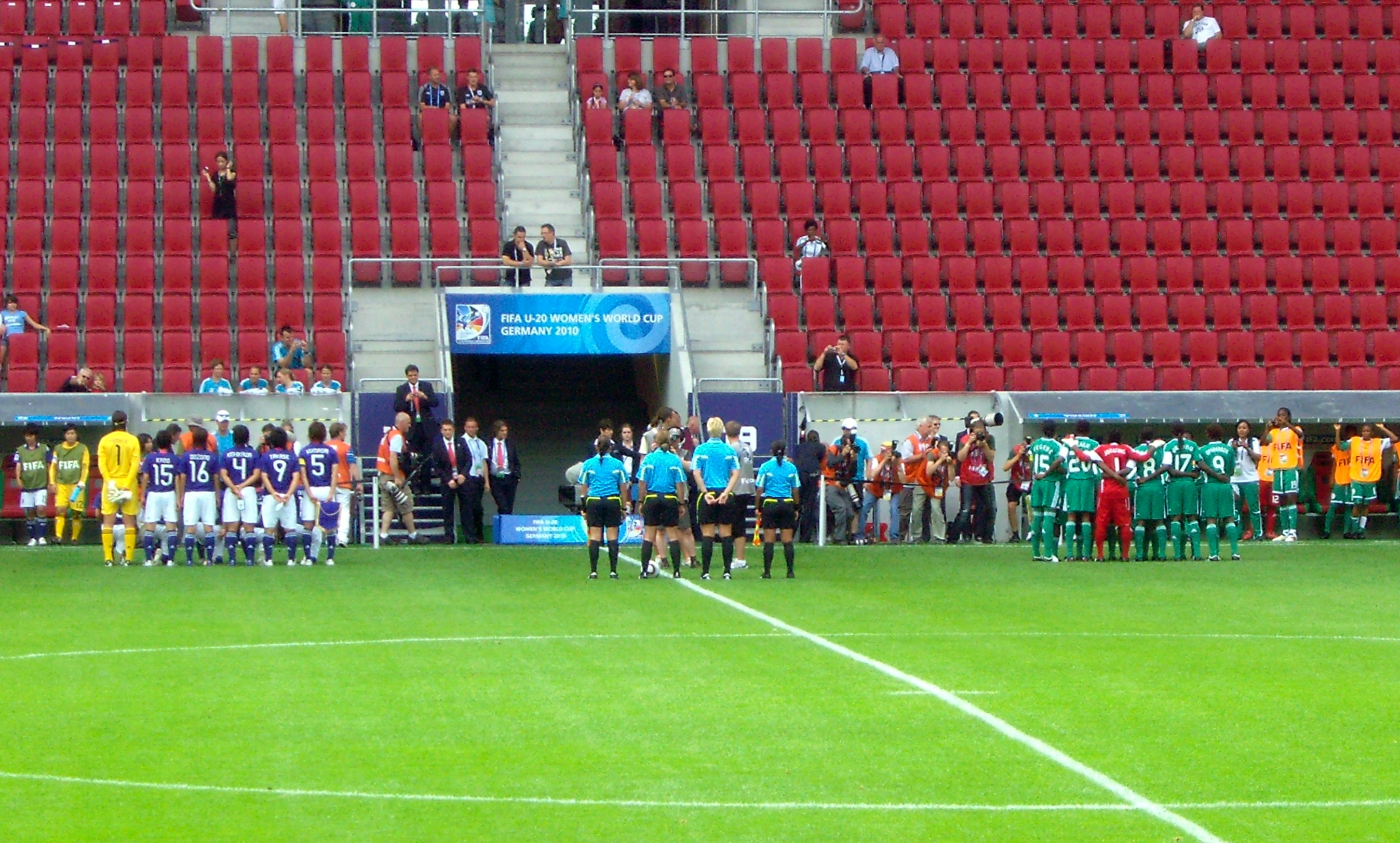
Teams of Japan and Nigeria, second group match day, 17 July 2010

Team	Pld	W	D	L	GF	GA	GD	Pts
Mexico	3	1	2	0	5	4	+1	5
Nigeria	3	1	2	0	4	3	+1	5
Japan	3	1	1	1	7	6	+1	4
England	3	0	1	2	2	5	−3	1

14 July 2010
11:30

England	1–1	Nigeria
Harrop 45'	Report	Oparanozie 59'

Impuls Arena, Augsburg
Attendance: 2,400
Referee: Jenny Palmqvist (Sweden)

14 July 2010
14:30

Mexico	3–3	Japan
Cuéllar 31'; Corral 41'; N. Rangel 45'	Report	Takase 19'; Cuéllar 64' (o.g.); Iwabuchi 88'

Impuls Arena, Augsburg
Attendance: 2,400
Referee: Bibiana Steinhaus (Germany)

17 July 2010
15:00

Nigeria	2–1	Japan
Okoronkwo 6'; Oparanozie 17'	Report	Iwabuchi 62'

Impuls Arena, Augsburg
Attendance: 3,100
Referee: Cristina Dorcioman (Romania)

17 July 2010
18:00

England	0–1	Mexico
	Report	Cuéllar 62'

Impuls Arena, Augsburg
Attendance: 3,100
Referee: Silvia Reyes (Peru)

21 July 2010
15:00

Japan	3–1	England
Nakajima 20'; Kishikawa 74', 78'	Report	Duggan 83' (pen.)

Bielefelder Alm, Bielefeld
Attendance: 5,420
Referee: Mercy Tagoe (Ghana)

21 July 2010
15:00

Nigeria	1–1	Mexico
Orji 16'	Report	Garciamendez 77'

Ruhrstadion, Bochum
Attendance: 2,450
Referee: Christina Pedersen (Norway)

=== Group D ===
Team	Pld	W	D	L	GF	GA	GD	Pts
United States	3	2	1	0	7	1	+6	7
South Korea	3	2	0	1	8	3	+5	6
Ghana	3	1	1	1	5	5	0	4
Switzerland	3	0	0	3	0	11	−11	0

14 July 2010
15:00

Switzerland	0–4	South Korea
	Report	Ji So-yun 34', 52', 64'; Lee Hyun-young 42'

Rudolf-Harbig-Stadion, Dresden
Attendance: 9,430
Referee: Silvia Reyes (Peru)

14 July 2010
18:00

United States	1–1	Ghana
Leroux 70'	Report	Cudjoe 7'

Rudolf-Harbig-Stadion, Dresden
Attendance: 9,430
Referee: Dagmar Damková (Czech Republic)

17 July 2010
15:00

Ghana	2–4	South Korea
Afriyie 28'; Cudjoe 56'	Report	Ji So-yun 41', 87'; Kim Na-rae 62'; Kim Jin-young 70'

Rudolf-Harbig-Stadion, Dresden
Attendance: 17,234
Referee: Christina Pedersen (Norway)

17 July 2010
18:00

United States	5–0	Switzerland
K. Mewis 4'; Leroux 23', 52', 76'; Bywaters 25'	Report

Rudolf-Harbig-Stadion, Dresden
Attendance: 17,234
Referee: Etsuko Fukano (Japan)

21 July 2010
18:00

South Korea	0–1	United States
	Report	Leroux 21'

Bielefelder Alm, Bielefeld
Attendance: 5,420
Referee: Bibiana Steinhaus (Germany)

21 July 2010
18:00

Ghana	2–0	Switzerland
Addo 31'; Cudjoe 42'	Report

Ruhrstadion, Bochum
Attendance: 2,450
Referee: Hong Eun-ah (Korea Republic)

== Knockout stage ==
=== Bracket ===
Quarter-finals
24 July — Bochum
Germany	2
North Korea	0
25 July — Dresden
Mexico	1
South Korea	3
24 July — Bielefeld
Sweden	0
Colombia	2
25 July — Augsburg
United States	1 (2)
Nigeria	1 (4)

Semi-finals
29 July — Bochum
Germany	5
South Korea	1
29 July — Bielefeld
Colombia	0
Nigeria	1

Final
1 August — Bielefeld
Germany	2
Nigeria	0
Third place
1 August — Bielefeld
South Korea	1
Colombia	0

=== Quarterfinals ===
24 July 2010
11:30

Sweden	0–2	Colombia
	Report	Rincón 11'; Ariza 22'

Bielefelder Alm, Bielefeld
Attendance: 4,735
Referee: Hong Eun-ah (Korea Republic)

24 July 2010
18:00

Germany	2–0	North Korea
Popp 43'; Arnold 69'	Report

Ruhrstadion, Bochum
Attendance: 16,946
Referee: Silvia Reyes (Peru)

25 July 2010
11:30

United States	1–1 (a.e.t.)	Nigeria
Brooks 9'	Report	Ukaonu 79'
Penalties
Nairn (penalty missed); Pathman (penalty scored); K. Mewis (penalty scored); Leroux (penalty missed)	2–4	(penalty scored) Jegede; (penalty scored) Ukaonu; (penalty scored) Sunday; (penalty scored) Oparanozie

Impuls Arena, Augsburg
Attendance: 7,135
Referee: Saša Ihringová (England)

25 July 2010
18:30

Mexico	1–3	South Korea
Gómez Junco 83'	Report	Lee Hyun-young 14', 67'; Ji So-yun 28'

Rudolf-Harbig-Stadion, Dresden
Attendance: 21,146
Referee: Dagmar Damková (Czech Republic)

=== Semifinals ===
29 July 2010
15:30

Germany	5–1	South Korea
Huth 13'; Kulig 26', 53'; Popp 50', 67' (pen.)	Report	Ji So-yun 64'

Ruhrstadion, Bochum
Attendance: 18,217
Referee: Silvia Reyes (Peru)

29 July 2010
18:30

Colombia	0–1	Nigeria
	Report	Orji 2'

Bielefelder Alm, Bielefeld
Attendance: 7,040
Referee: Christina Pedersen (Norway)

=== Third place playoff ===
1 August 2010
12:00

South Korea	1–0	Colombia
Ji So-yun 49'	Report

Bielefelder Alm, Bielefeld
Attendance: 24,633
Referee: Bibiana Steinhaus (Germany)

=== Final ===
1 August 2010
15:00

Germany	2–0	Nigeria
Popp 8'; Ohale 90+2' (o.g.)	Report

Bielefelder Alm, Bielefeld
Attendance: 24,633
Referee: Carole Anne Chenard (Canada)

2010 FIFA U-20 Women's World Cup winners

Germany
Second title

== Awards ==
The following awards were given for the tournament:

Golden Ball	Silver Ball	Bronze Ball
(Germany) Alexandra Popp	(South Korea) Ji So-yun	(Germany) Kim Kulig
Golden Shoe	Silver Shoe	Bronze Shoe
(Germany) Alexandra Popp	(South Korea) Ji So-yun	(United States) Sydney Leroux
10 goals	8 goals	5 goals
Golden Glove
(United States) Bianca Henninger
FIFA Fair Play Award
South Korea

== Goalscorers ==
10 goals

- (Germany) Alexandra Popp

8 goals

- (South Korea) Ji So-yun

5 goals

- (United States) Sydney Leroux

4 goals

- (Sweden) Antonia Göransson

3 goals

- (France) Marina Makanza
- (Ghana) Elizabeth Cudjoe
- (South Korea) Lee Hyun-young

2 goals

- (Brazil) Débora
- (Colombia) Daniela Montoya
- (Colombia) Yoreli Rincón
- (Germany) Marina Hegering
- (Germany) Kim Kulig
- (Germany) Svenja Huth
- (Germany) Sylvia Arnold
- (Japan) Mana Iwabuchi
- (Japan) Natsuki Kishikawa
- (Mexico) Renae Cuéllar
- (Nigeria) Desire Oparanozie
- (Nigeria) Ebere Orji

1 goal

- (Brazil) Leah
- (Brazil) Ludmila
- (Brazil) Rafaelle
- (Colombia) Lady Andrade
- (Colombia) Melissa Ortiz
- (Colombia) Tatiana Ariza
- (Costa Rica) Katherine Alvarado
- (Costa Rica) Carolina Venegas
- (England) Toni Duggan
- (England) Kerys Harrop
- (France) Pauline Crammer
- (Germany) Dzsenifer Marozsán
- (Ghana) Elizabeth Addo
- (Ghana) Deborah Afriyie
- (Japan) Emi Nakajima
- (Japan) Megumi Takase
- (North Korea) Ho Un-byol
- (North Korea) Jon Myong-hwa
- (North Korea) Kim Myong-gum
- (North Korea) Kim Un-hyang
- (North Korea) Yun Hyon-hi
- (South Korea) Kim Jin-young
- (South Korea) Kim Na-rae
- (Mexico) Charlyn Corral
- (Mexico) Alina Garciamendez
- (Mexico) Natalia Gómez Junco
- (Mexico) Nayeli Rangel
- (New Zealand) Bridgette Armstrong
- (New Zealand) Hannah Wilkinson
- (New Zealand) Rosie White
- (Nigeria) Amarachi Okoronkwo
- (Nigeria) Helen Ukaonu
- (Sweden) Sofia Jakobsson
- (United States) Amber Brooks
- (United States) Zakiya Bywaters
- (United States) Kristie Mewis

1 own goal

- (Mexico) Renae Cuéllar (for Japan)
- (North Korea) Hyon Un-hui (for Sweden)
- (Nigeria) Osinachi Ohale (for Germany)
