= Daniel Kraus =

Daniel Kraus may refer to:

- Dan Kraus (1923–2012), American basketball player
- Daniel Kraus (author) (born 1975), American author
- Daniel Kraus (footballer) (born 1984), German former footballer
