= Julia Arnold =

Julia Arnold may refer to:

- Julia Huxley, née Arnold, British scholar and school founder
- Julia Arnold (footballer), German footballer

== See also ==
- E. Clarke and Julia Arnold House, a Frank Lloyd Wright designed home in Columbus, Wisconsin, United States
