= Fata Salkunič =

Slovenian footballer

Personal information
- Full name: Fata Salkunič
- Date of birth: 9 March 1991 (age 35)
- Place of birth: Ljubljana, SFR Yugoslavia
- Height: 1.67 m (5 ft 6 in)
- Position: Midfielder

Senior career*
Years	Team	Apps	(Gls)
2006–2007	Maribor	17	(3)
2007–2009	Krka	31	(30)
2009–2010	Hamburger SV	4	(0)
2010–2011	Basel	17	(2)
2011	Jena	5	(0)

International career
- Slovenia
- * Club domestic league appearances and goals

Fata Salkunič is a currently unattached Slovenian football midfielder, currently playing for USV Jena in the German Bundesliga. She previously played for ZNK Maribor and Krka Novo Mesto in the Slovenian League, Hamburger SV in the Bundesliga and FC Basel in the Swiss Nationalliga A.

She is a member of the Slovenian national team.
