= Crystelle-Ida Ngnipoho-Pokam =

Cameroonian footballer

Personal information
- Full name: Crystelle-Ida Ngnipoho-Pokam
- Date of birth: April 24, 1987 (age 39)
- Place of birth: Bafoussam, Cameroon
- Position: Defender

Youth career
- 2000–2005: Princesse de Mbanga

Senior career*
Years	Team	Apps	(Gls)
2005–2007	Princesse de Mbanga		
2007–2008	Justice Douala		
2008	FF USV Jena	0	(0)
2009	AS Génie		
2010–	FC Franck Rohliceck		

International career
- Cameroon
- * Club domestic league appearances and goals

Crystelle-Ida Ngnipoho-Pokam (born April 24, 1987) is a Cameroonian soccer player.

Ngnipoho-Pokam plays on the Cameroonian national team. In 2008, Ngnipoho-Pokam played for the FF USV Jena, and in 2009 she played for AS Génie.

== Position ==
Ngnipoho-Pokam is a defender.
