= Marina Himmighofen =

German footballer

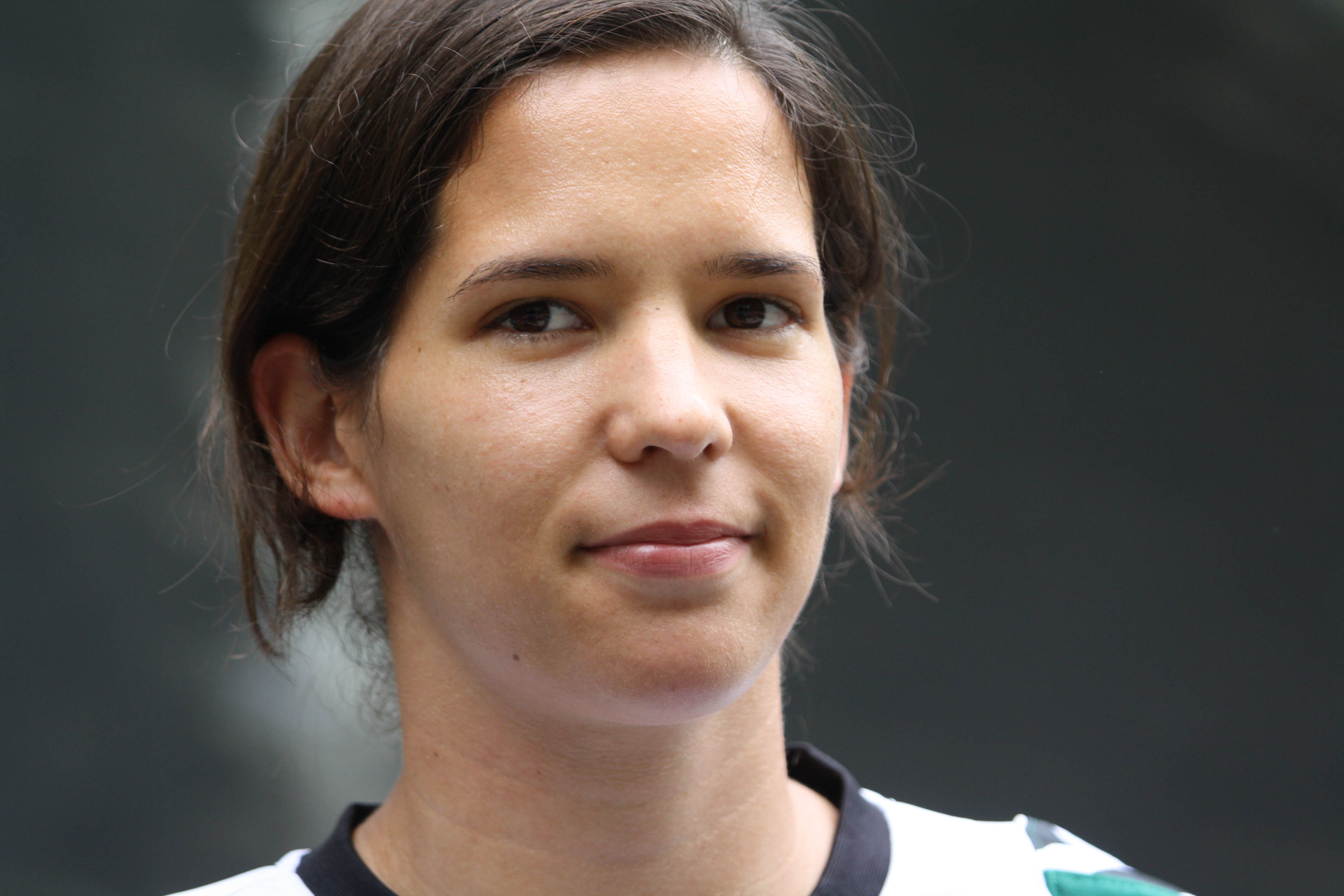

Personal information
- Date of birth: 11 November 1984 (age 41)
- Place of birth: Koblenz, West Germany
- Height: 1.68 m (5 ft 6 in)
- Position: Centre back

Youth career
- SC 47 Weyer
- TV Bornich 1912
- –2001: TuS Ahrbach

Senior career*
Years	Team	Apps	(Gls)
2001–2007	SC 07 Bad Neuenahr	116	(0)
2007–2009	SG Essen-Schönebeck	41	(1)
2009–2013	FCR 2001 Duisburg	12	(0)
2014–2015	MSV Duisburg	11	(0)
2017–2020	MSV Duisburg		

International career^{‡}
2002	Germany U19	4	(0)
2003–2005	Germany U21	13	(0)
- * Club domestic league appearances and goals as of 30 November 2016 ‡ National team caps and goals as of 08:06, 24 April 2010 (UTC)

Marina Himmighofen (born 11 November 1984) is a German footballer currently playing for the Bundesliga team of the MSV Duisburg. She previously was active for the German federal police and competed in international police football.

== Honours ==
=== FCR 2001 Duisburg ===
- Bundesliga: Runner-up (1) 2009–10
- German Cup: Winner (1) 2009–10
