= Ron Armstrong =

English-born New Zealand footballer

Personal information
- Full name: Ronald W Armstrong
- Place of birth: England
- Position: Full-back

Senior career*
| Years | Team | Apps | (Gls) |
| 1967–1970 | North Shore United | | |
| 1971–1974 | Mount Wellington | | |
| 1974–1975 | Aston Villa | 0 | (0) |
| 1976–1977 | Mount Wellington | | |
| 1978 | Eastern Suburbs | | |
| 1979–1990 | Mount Wellington | | |

International career
| 1971–1983 | New Zealand | 25 | (0) |
Medal record
Men's association football
Representing New Zealand
OFC Nations Cup
| Winner | 1973 New Zealand |
- * Club domestic league appearances and goals

Ronald W Armstrong is a former New Zealand association football player who represented New Zealand.

Armstrong made his full All Whites debut in a 2–4 loss to New Caledonia on 18 July 1971 and he ended his international playing career with 25 A-international caps to his credit, his final cap being in a 1–0 win over Taiwan on 1 October 1983.

Armstrong is one of only two players to have appeared in eight Chatham Cup finals.

Armstrong's family is well represented in international football. His father Ken Armstrong was a dual international representing both England and New Zealand, his brother Brian Armstrong also represented New Zealand and daughter Bridgette Armstrong represented New Zealand at senior level and at the 2008 FIFA U-17 and FIFA U-20 Women's World Cups.

Ron Armstrong was only the second player to appear in 300 games in the New Zealand National Soccer League, a feat he achieved in 1988

== Honours ==
New Zealand

- OFC Nations Cup: 1973

Individual

- New Zealand Footballer of the Year: 1971
