= Jackie Cruz (footballer) =

Puerto Rican international footballer

Personal information
- Full name: Jacqueline Marie Cruz
- Date of birth: 2 December 1986 (age 39)
- Place of birth: San Mateo, California, United States
- Height: 1.65 m (5 ft 5 in)
- Position: Defender

College career
Years	Team	Apps	(Gls)
2004–2006	San Jose State Spartans		
2007-2010	Cal State East Bay Pioneers		

Senior career*
Years	Team	Apps	(Gls)
2007–2009	San Francisco Nighthawks	5	(0)
2010	California Storm	23	(1)
2011–2013	BV Cloppenburg	33	(5)
2013–2015	Magdeburger FFC		(7)
2015–2016	FF USV Jena	9	(0)

International career
2008–2016	Puerto Rico	14	(2)
- * Club domestic league appearances and goals as of August 27, 2016

Jacqueline Marie Cruz (born 2 December 1986) is an American-born Puerto Rican footballer who played as a defender.

== Club career ==
Cruz previously played for WPSL sides San Francisco Nighthawks, California Storm, and BV Cloppenburg, Magdeburg FFC, and USV Jena in Germany's 1st and 2nd Bundesliga. She also played on the Puerto Rico women's national team.

== Business career ==
Cruz graduated in 2015 with an MBA at Arizona State University while playing professional football. Currently, she is Head of International Communication at Eintracht Frankfurt Fussball AG since 2018 and graduated with her Doctorate in Economics (Dr. rer oec.) at the HHL Leipzig Graduate School of Management in Economics on the topics of professional football management and sustainability in February 2022.
