= Brian Armstrong (footballer) =

New Zealand footballer

Personal information
- Full name: Brian Armstrong
- Place of birth: England
- Position: Midfielder

Senior career*
Years	Team	Apps	(Gls)
- Mt Wellington

International career
1973–1975	New Zealand	9	(0)
Medal record
Men's association football
Representing New Zealand
OFC Nations Cup
Winner	1973 New Zealand
- * Club domestic league appearances and goals

Brian Armstrong is a former New Zealand association football player who represented New Zealand.

Armstrong made his full All Whites debut in a 5–1 win over Fiji on 17 February 1973 and he ended his international playing career with 9 A-international caps to his credit, his final cap being a substitute appearance in a 1–1 draw with Australia on 4 March 1975.

== Armstrong family ==
Armstrong's family is well represented in international football. His father Ken Armstrong was a dual international representing both England and New Zealand, his brother Ron Armstrong also represented New Zealand while niece Bridgette Armstrong represented New Zealand at senior level and at the 2008 FIFA U-17 and FIFA U-20 Women's World Cups.

== Honours ==
New Zealand

- OFC Nations Cup: 1973
