= Ken Armstrong (footballer, born 1924) =

English footballer

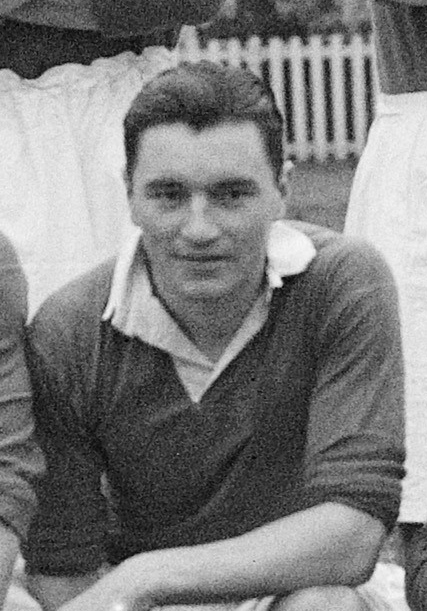
- Armstrong in a Chelsea team photo in 1947

Personal information
- Full name: Kenneth Armstrong
- Date of birth: 3 June 1924
- Place of birth: Bradford, Yorkshire, England
- Date of death: 13 June 1984 (aged 60)
- Place of death: New Zealand
- Position: Wing half

Youth career
- 1938–1946: Bradford Rovers

Senior career*
Years	Team	Apps	(Gls)
1946–1957	Chelsea	402	(30)
1957–1958	Eastern Union		
1959–1964	North Shore United		
1965–1966	Eastern Suburbs		
1967–1970	North Shore United		
1970–1971	Mount Wellington	1	(0)

International career
1954	England B	3	(0)
1955	England	1	(0)
1958–1962	New Zealand	9	(3)

Managerial career
- 1958–1964: New Zealand
- 1959–1964: North Shore United
- 1971–1977: Mount Wellington
- 1978–1979: Eastern Suburbs
- 1980: New Zealand women
- * Club domestic league appearances and goals

Kenneth Armstrong (3 June 1924 – 13 June 1984) was an English footballer who represented both England and New Zealand at national level.

== Club career ==
Born in Bradford, Armstrong served in the RAF during the Second World War. He was a versatile, tough-tackling and energetic midfielder who played mainly for Chelsea, joining the club from Bradford Rovers in 1946 for a fee of 100 guineas. Armstrong was a key member of Ted Drake's 1954–55 Championship-winning Chelsea side, making 39 appearances that season. He played in over 400 games (including a then-club record 362 league games) for the West London club and scored 30 goals.

Armstrong had a testimonial staged by Chelsea for their long-serving player and a crowd of 14,000 at Stamford Bridge were on hand to see newly-promoted Leicester City beaten 2-1 in May 1957.

After leaving Chelsea in 1957, Armstrong emigrated to Gisborne, New Zealand and continued to play football there for the Eastern Union club. In early 1958, while in Gisborne, Armstrong was offered a playing contract at Melbourne Hakoah in Australia, which he declined to continue on as the New Zealand Director of Coaching. Later in 1958, while still playing for Eastern Union, Armstrong was selected in the Auckland regional representative side to play touring Israeli club Maccabi Haifa Armstrong then moved to Auckland, signing for North Shore United and later Eastern Suburbs, winning four Chatham Cups. He then took over as manager at Mount Wellington, winning two league titles (in 1972 and 1974) and another Chatham Cup, in 1973. He played his last game in 1971, aged almost 47. Armstrong was later appointed chief coach of the New Zealand national side.

== International career ==
Armstrong was a member of the England national team's 1954 FIFA World Cup squad but did not travel to Switzerland, remaining in England as one of five players on reserve status. He won a solitary England cap, against Scotland at Wembley in England's famous 7–2 win in the British Home Championship in April 1955.

After emigrating to New Zealand in 1957, Armstrong played a significant part in developing football in his adopted country and played 13 times for the national side, including nine A-internationals in which he scored three goals.

Armstrong played 59 first class representative matches in New Zealand and scored 18 goals. He played 16 matches in total for New Zealand, 13 against international opposition, and 3 against local sides. Armstrong played two matches for the North Island, one New Zealand trial match, three matches for Poverty Bay (scoring 3 goals), two matches for Waikato/Poverty Bay (scoring 2 goals), and thirty-five matches for Auckland (scoring 12 goals). His final representative appearance was at centre-forward for Auckland against Northern New South Wales in 1965. Armstrong continued playing in the Northern League for North Shore United AFC until 1969.

In 1991, he was posthumously inducted into the New Zealand Soccer Media Association Hall of Fame.

== Managerial career ==
Armstrong was an initial proponent of a National League for New Zealand football. In 1959, as New Zealand Director of Coaching and captain of the national side, he urged the NZFA to investigate the implementation of a national club competition, and to begin contracting top players across the country to limit the player drain to Australia.

Armstrong managed National League side Mount Wellington, and was player manager of the New Zealand national soccer team from 1958 to 1964, taking charge of 32 games in that period, winning 11, losing 19 and drawing two. In 1980, he took charge of the New Zealand women's national soccer team.

== Family ==
Armstrong's family is well represented in international football. His sons Ron and Brian also represented the All Whites, while Ron's granddaughter Bridgette Armstrong represented New Zealand at senior level and at the 2008 FIFA U-17 and FIFA U-20 Women's World Cups.

== Death ==
Armstrong died in 1984 and his ashes were scattered at Stamford Bridge.

== Honours ==
=== Player ===
Chelsea

- Football League First Division: 1954–55
- FA Charity Shield: 1955

North Shore United

- Chatham Cup: 1960, 1961, 1963
- Auckland Football Association representative: 1961 FA Trophy.

Eastern Suburbs

- Chatham Cup: 1965

=== Manager ===
Mount Wellington

- National Soccer League: 1972, 1974
- Chatham Cup: 1973
