= Antonia Göransson =

Swedish footballer

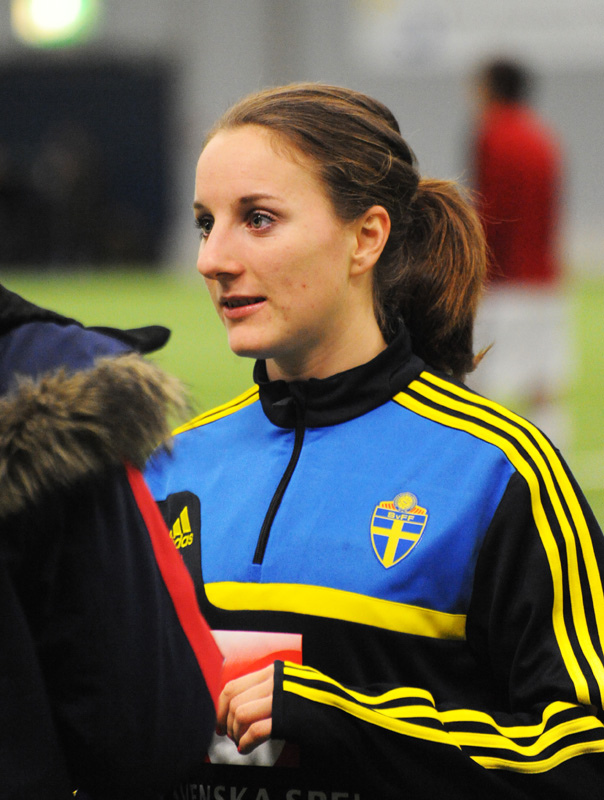

Personal information
- Full name: Antonia Pia Anna Göransson
- Date of birth: 16 September 1990 (age 36)
- Place of birth: Stockholm, Sweden
- Height: 1.69 m (5 ft 7 in)
- Position: Winger

Youth career
- 1995–1996: Sjöbo IF
- 1997–2002: Hornskrokens IF
- 2003–2004: Trångfors IF
- 2005–2006: Alviks IK
- 2006–2008: Malmö FF

Senior career*
Years	Team	Apps	(Gls)
2007–2008	→ Husie IF (loan)		
2007	→ BK Skjold (loan)		
2008–2010	Kristianstads DFF	38	(8)
2010–2011	Hamburger SV	17	(6)
2011–2014	1. FFC Turbine Potsdam	54	(13)
2014–2015	Vittsjö GIK	29	(5)
2016	Seattle Reign FC	0	(0)
2016–2017	Mallbackens IF	16	(3)
2017	Kolbotn	10	(2)
2017	Fiorentina	1	(0)
2018	Assi IF	5	(0)
2019–2020	Bayer 04 Leverkusen	4	(6)
2020	Växjö	10	(10)

International career^{‡}
2010–2015	Sweden	50	(8)
Medal record
Women's football
Representing Sweden
FIFA Women's World Cup
Bronze medal – third place	2011 Germany	Team
- * Club domestic league appearances and goals as of 17:27, 23 April 2021 (UTC) ‡ National team caps and goals as of 17:27, 23 April 2021 (UTC)

Antonia Pia Anna Göransson (born 16 September 1990) is a Swedish former footballer who played as a winger. A product of Malmö FF's youth system, Göransson began her Damallsvenskan career with Kristianstads DFF in 2008. She moved to Germany in 2010, with SV Hamburg, before joining Turbine Potsdam a year later.

After making her debut for the senior Sweden women's national football team in October 2010, Göransson represented her country at the 2011 FIFA Women's World Cup, the 2012 London Olympics and the 2013 UEFA Women's Championship. A fast and skilful winger, Göransson can strike the ball equally well with either foot.

== Club career ==
=== Early career ===
Born in Stockholm, Göransson moved to Sjöbo aged three, then Boden aged seven. She played for various clubs in this period before signing for Malmö FF at youth level when the family returned to Skåne County in 2006. At Malmö Göransson came under the influence of youth coach Lena Videkull, whom she credited for a rapid improvement in all aspects of her game.

Göransson was sent on loan to Malmö's lower division nursery club Husie IF. She also spent part of the 2007–2008 season on loan to BK Skjold in Copenhagen, scoring three goals in the Danish Elitedivisionen.

=== Kristianstads DFF ===
In summer 2008, Göransson quit Malmö for a low-key transfer to their Damallsvenskan rivals Kristianstads DFF. After adjusting to first team football in the remainder of the 2008 season, Göransson flourished under the leadership of KDFF's Icelandic coach Elísabet Gunnarsdóttir in 2009. She became an important part of the team, scoring five goals in 19 league matches and winning the Swedish Football Association's Rookie of the Year award.

Ambitious 18-year-old Göransson informed Kristianstads that the chances of her remaining at the club for another season were 50:50. In 2010, she played 16 matches and scored three league goals for Kristianstads, before accepting a professional contract offer from SV Hamburg in August 2010.

=== Germany ===
Göransson performed well in 2010–11, her first season in the Frauen-Bundesliga, scoring six goals in her 17 appearances. Hamburg were keen to extend the initial one-year contract she had signed. Instead Göransson accepted a competing offer from Frauen-Bundesliga champions Turbine Potsdam, signing a two-year contract.

=== Back to Sweden ===
In June 2014 Göransson left Turbine Potsdam and returned to Sweden to join Vittsjö GIK. She signed a contract until the end of the 2015 season. American National Women's Soccer League club Seattle Reign FC announced in November 2015 that they had signed Göransson for their 2016 season. Weeks before she was due to leave for the United States, Göransson was diagnosed with Type 1 Diabetes. She travelled to Seattle against medical advice, but returned to Sweden after only a short period with the team, during which she had felt unwell and stressed. She signed for Mallbackens IF and was more settled living in a small town in a quiet area, closer to her family and support network.

=== Norway and Italy ===
Göransson signed for Norwegian Toppserien club Kolbotn Fotball in February 2017. In spring 2017 she played 12 times for Kolbotn, including 10 league games, and scored one goal. Her good form brought her to the attention of other clubs and in July 2017 she agreed a two-year contract with Fiorentina, reigning champions of the Italian Serie A. She made one appearance for the team against AGSM Verona, being substituted after 57 minutes, then was released from her contract in December 2017.

=== Retirement ===
Bayer 04 Leverkusen signed Göransson to a two-year contract in September 2019. She was yet again coached by Achim Feifel. Feifel coached Göransson in Hamburg in 2010. She has always praised the German training culture. Leverkusen has according to Göransson a very professional environment. Although she didn't get too many minutes under the belt in bundesliga she developed every training session. She was the best she had ever been in the training sessions, but unfortunately she didn't (according to herself) play as well as she did in training when she got minutes in bundesliga. This was a real shame. The coach praised her performance several periods during 2019–20 as she was outstanding in training. But like Göransson herself said. It was unfortunate that she didn't reach the same level in bundesliga. Feifel is one of her absolute favorite coaches. She wanted to win back her place in the national team ahead of the 2020 Olympics. She returned to Sweden in August 2020, joining Växjö where she played once in the Damallsvenskan and once in the Svenska Cupen Damer. She decided to end her football career before the 2021 Damallsvenskan season.

== International career ==
As a Swedish under-19 international, Göransson played in the 2009 U-19 European Championship in Belarus, where Sweden lost 2–0 in the final to England. At the 2010 U-20 World Cup in Germany, Göransson was surprised to be utilised as a makeshift striker. She scored four goals in four games as Sweden were beaten 2–0 by Colombia in the quarter-final.

In February 2010, Göransson and Emilia Appelqvist were called up to train with the senior national team for the Algarve Cup. Göransson was named in the senior national team squad for the first time in March 2010, replacing the injured Kosovare Asllani for a 2011 FIFA Women's World Cup qualifier in Wales. She made her first senior appearance in October 2010; a 3–1 friendly win over longstanding rivals Norway in Falkenberg.

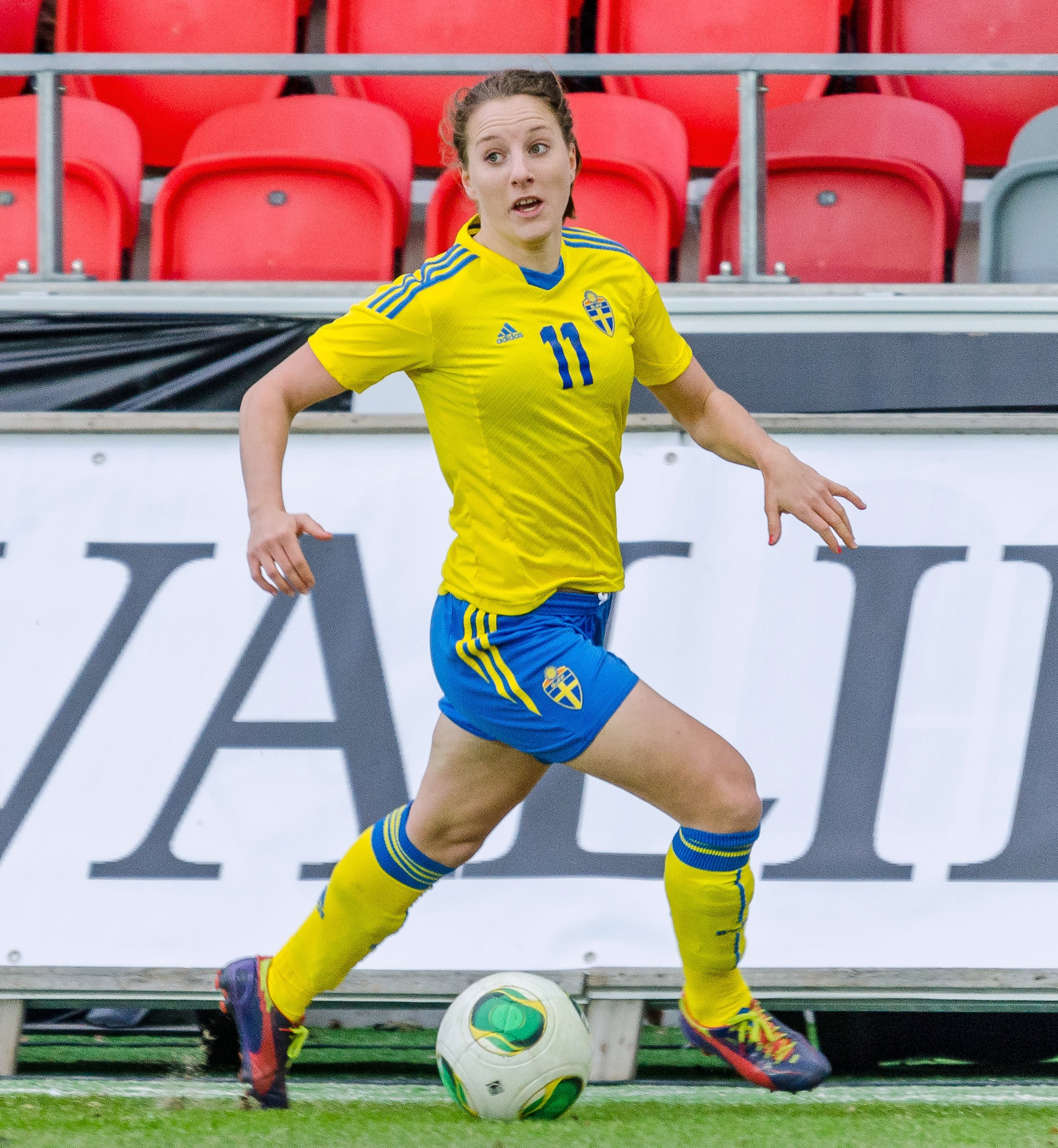
Göransson in April 2013

Quotes attributed to Göransson in local newspapers strongly criticised national team coach Thomas Dennerby for leaving her out of the national team. But she later distanced herself from the remarks, stressing that her relationship with Dennerby was good. Angry Dennerby wrote an open letter, criticising state broadcaster Sveriges Television for unethically taking Göransson's quotes out of context. When she was named in Dennerby's squad for the 2011 FIFA Women's World Cup in Germany, delighted Göransson said she had dreamed of the opportunity since she was 12 years old. She featured as a substitute in Sweden's 3–1 semi-final defeat to eventual winners Japan in Frankfurt. Sweden secured third place by beating France 2–1 in Sinsheim, although Göransson did not play.

Third place in the World Cup secured Sweden's qualification for the 2012 Olympic football tournament in London. Dennerby kept Göransson in Sweden's Olympic squad for London, and she made a substitute appearance in Sweden's 2–1 defeat by France in the quarter-final at Hampden Park. In June 2013, incoming coach Pia Sundhage named Göransson in the squad for UEFA Women's Euro 2013, which Sweden hosted. When the Swedes lost 1–0 to Germany in the semi-final, disappointed Göransson was glad that the team had managed to raise the profile of women's football in Sweden.

In September 2013 Sundhage tried Göransson in the left back position during Sweden's 2015 FIFA Women's World Cup qualification matches. Göransson responded positively to the experiment. Sundhage dropped Göransson from the national squad for an important qualifier against Scotland because she was not playing often enough at club level for Turbine Potsdam. Although Göransson found regular first-team football with Vittsjö and returned to the national squad for the 2015 Algarve Cup,

== Playing style ==
Göransson can play equally well with either foot. She describes her left foot as more powerful and her right foot as more accurate. An editorial in the Dagens Nyheter newspaper published during the 2011 FIFA Women's World Cup called for Göransson to be included in the national team's starting line-up, praising her pace, power and technique.

Göransson has been honoured twice at 2 indoor tournaments with Turbine Potsdam. In 2013 and in 2014. In 2013, when the tournament was held in Magdeburg, she was chosen into a "Hall of Fame" in Germany along stars like Birgitt Prinz, Alexandra Popp after being awarded the title of "best player of the tournament", at the same tournament, she also won the Golden Boot award for scoring most goals, 6.

In 2014, she was also named the best player of the tournament for an indoor football tournament hosted by Turbine Potsdam . This was a special moment for her since it was awarded based on votes by the coaches of all the teams. Göransson also won the golden boot award for this tournament.

== Honours ==
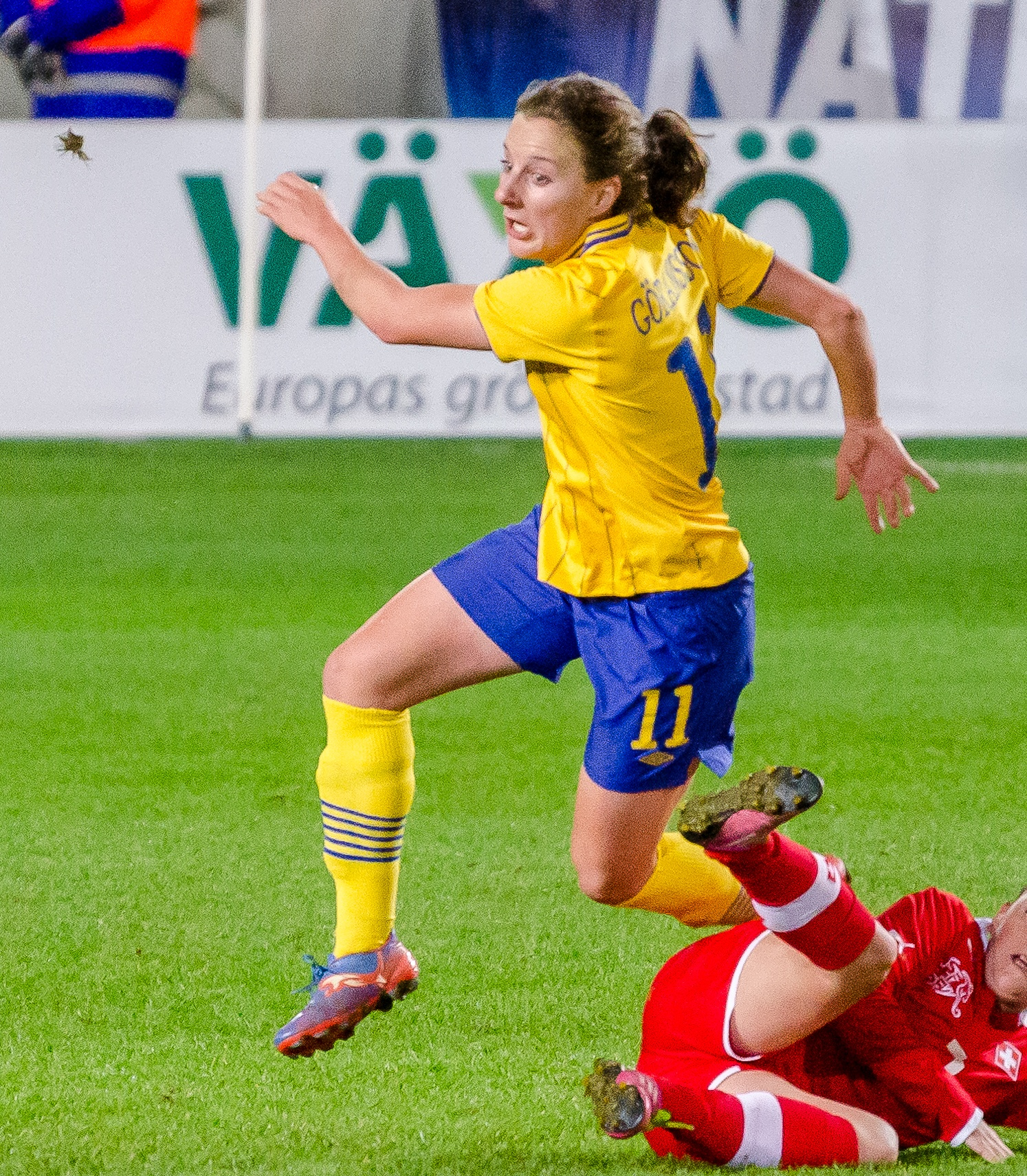
Göransson playing her first game for new coach Pia Sundhage at Växjö's Myresjöhus Arena

Turbine Potsdam

- Frauen-Bundesliga (1): 2011–12

Sweden

- FIFA Women's World Cup Third place: 2011

Olympics 2012 Third place EM Sweden 2013

Individual

Best Swedish New Talent in 2010

Chosen into Hall of fame at DFB Hallenpokal in Magdeburg in 2013.

Chosen into hall of fame, at Turbine Potsdam's International indoor tournament in 2014.

Guldkepsen Winner, Kristianstad 2010.

50 Caps for Sweden achieved in 2015.
