= Heidi Vater =

German footballer and manager

Personal information
- Full name: Heidi Vater
- Date of birth: 7 July 1966 (age 60)
- Place of birth: Apolda, East Germany
- Height: 1.60 m (5 ft 3 in)
- Position: Defender

Senior career*
Years	Team	Apps	(Gls)
1987–1990	HSG Jena		
1990–2005	USV Jena		

International career
1990	East Germany	1	(0)

Managerial career
- 1998–2010: USV Jena
- * Club domestic league appearances and goals

Heidi Vater (born 7 July 1966) is a German former footballer and manager who played as a defender, appearing for the East Germany women's national team in their first and only match on 9 May 1990.

== Career statistics ==
=== International ===
East Germany
Year	Apps	Goals
1990	1	0
Total	1	0
