= Susann Utes =

German footballer (born 1991)

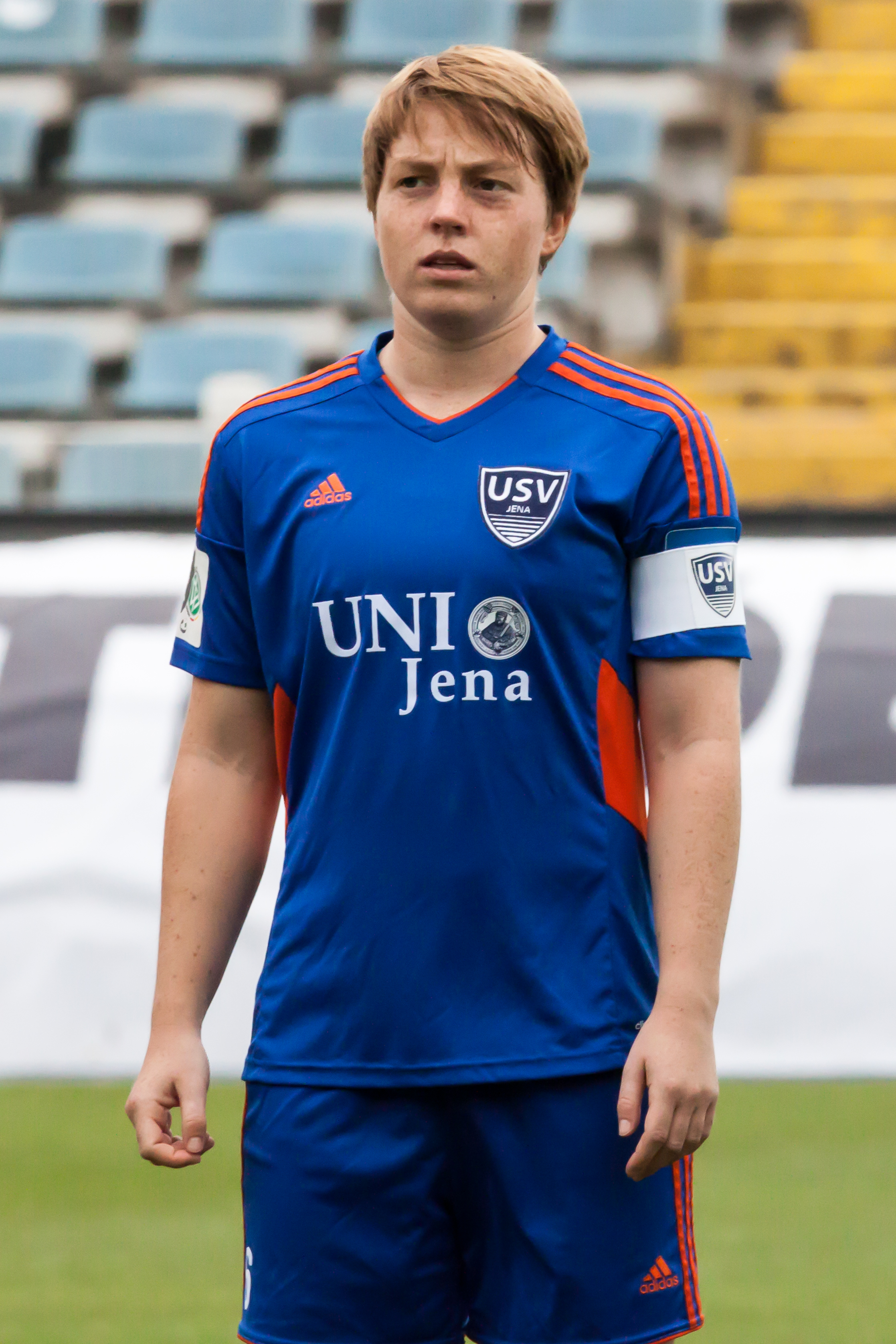
- Utes in 2014

Personal information
- Date of birth: 4 January 1991 (age 35)
- Place of birth: Kühlungsborn, Germany
- Height: 1.58 m (5 ft 2 in)
- Position: Midfielder

Youth career
- SV Einheit Bad Doberan
- –2006: Bad Doberaner SV 90
- 2006–2008: SV Hafen Rostock 61

Senior career*
Years	Team	Apps	(Gls)
2006–2008	SV Hafen Rostock 61		
2008–2019	FF USV Jena	194	(21)
- * Club domestic league appearances and goals

Susann Utes (born 4 January 1991) is a German former footballer who played as a midfielder for FC Carl Zeiss Jena.
