= Daniel Kraus (footballer) =

German football player and manager (born 1984)

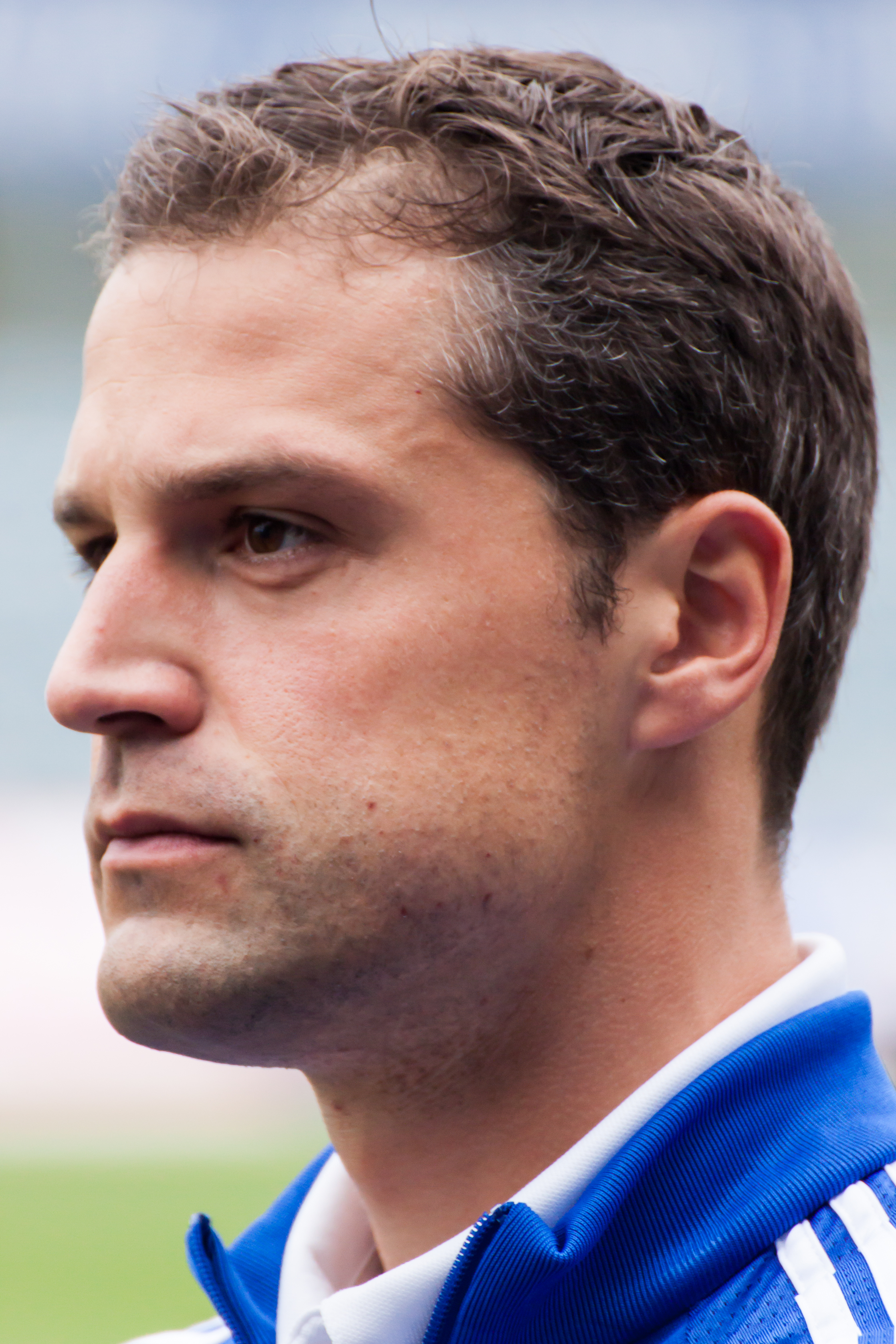
- Kraus in 2014

Personal information
- Date of birth: 11 May 1984 (age 42)
- Place of birth: Leipzig, East Germany
- Height: 1.81 m (5 ft 11 in)
- Position: Goalkeeper

Youth career
- 1990–1996: Einheit Rottleben
- 1996–1997: Eintracht Sondershausen
- 1997–2003: Carl Zeiss Jena

Senior career*
Years	Team	Apps	(Gls)
2005–2010	Carl Zeiss Jena	15	(0)
2006–2010	Carl Zeiss Jena II	51	(0)

Managerial career
- 2010–2016: FF USV Jena (Goalkeeper coach)
- 2010–2016: FF USV Jena
- 2016–2019: SGS Essen
- 2019–2022: SC Freiburg (women)
- * Club domestic league appearances and goals

Daniel Kraus (born 11 May 1984 in Leipzig) is a German former footballer and former head coach of SC Freiburg (women).

== Coaching career ==
Kraus holds coaching licence C and began as goalkeeper coach for FF USV Jena in July 2010.
