= Bridgette Armstrong =

New Zealand footballer (born 1992)

Personal information
- Full name: Bridgette Kate Armstrong
- Date of birth: 9 November 1992 (age 34)
- Place of birth: Auckland, New Zealand
- Height: 1.75 m (5 ft 9 in)
- Position: Defender

Team information
- Current team: Glenfield Rovers

International career^{‡}
Years	Team	Apps	(Gls)
2008	New Zealand U-17		
2008–2012	New Zealand U-20	13	(1)
2009–	New Zealand	3	(1)
- ‡ National team caps and goals as of 3 October 2010

Bridgette Kate Armstrong (born 9 November 1992), is a member of the Football Ferns, the New Zealand women's national football team.

She was a member of the New Zealand squad in the inaugural FIFA U-17 Women's World Cup, playing all three group games; a 0–1 loss to Canada, a 1–2 loss to Denmark, and a 3–1 win over Colombia.

Armstrong also represented New Zealand at the 2008 FIFA U-20 Women's World Cup in Chile, again playing all three group games; a 2–3 loss to Nigeria, a 4–3 win over hosts Chile, and scored New Zealand's goal against England before England equalised late in injury time to eliminate New Zealand from the tournament. In 2010, she represented New Zealand at the 2010 FIFA U-20 Women's World Cup in Germany, appearing in all three group games.

Armstrong made her senior international debut as a substitute in a friendly against Japan on 14 November 2009, and scored her first international goal in a 7–0 win over Tahiti on 3 October 2010.

Armstrong's family is well represented in international football. Her grandfather father Ken Armstrong was a dual international representing both England and New Zealand. Father Ron Armstrong and uncle Brian Armstrong also represented New Zealand.

Armstrong attended Long Bay College.
