= FC Carl Zeiss Jena (women) =

Carl Zeiss Jena
- Founded: 2017; 9 years ago
- Ground: Ernst-Abbe-Sportfeld
- Capacity: 15,000
- Chairman: Ralf Schmidt-Röh
- Manager: Christopher Heck
- League: Frauen-Bundesliga
- 2025–26: Bundesliga, 14th of 14 (relegated)
Home colours	Away colours

FC Carl Zeiss Jena is a German women's football club from Jena, Thuringia. The club currently plays in the Bundesliga, the highest level of women's football in Germany. It is part of the FC Carl Zeiss Jena club.

Carl Zeiss Jena played regional women's football since 2016–17 but became more prominent, when it merged with FF USV Jena in 2020.

== History ==
=== FF USV Jena ===
Former logo as FF USV Jena

The roots of women's football in Jena date back to the days of East Germany, where USV Jena (then HSG Uni Jena) became the Regionalliga Nordost champion in 1991, earning promotion to the unified Frauen-Bundesliga in 1991–92. However, the team was immediately relegated. After several years in the lower tiers, the club resurged in the early 2000s.

In 2003, the women's football section split from USV Jena to form FF USV Jena. That same year, the team won the Regionalliga Nordost but narrowly missed promotion. In 2004, they qualified for the newly created 2. Bundesliga and quickly established themselves as contenders. After finishing runners-up in 2006–07, they won the southern division title in 2007–08 and earned promotion to the Bundesliga.

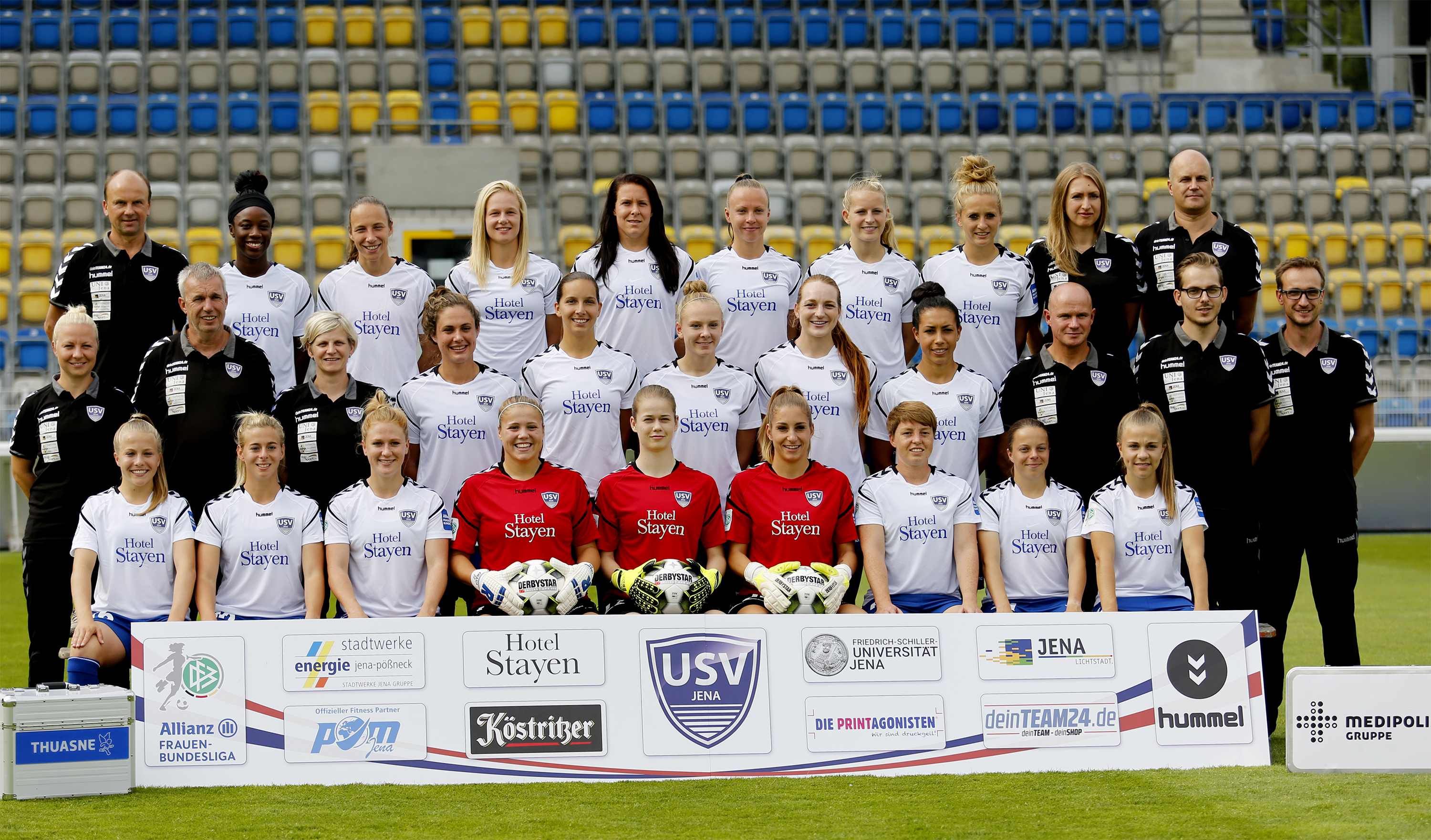
FF USV Jena squad for the 2017–18 season

FF USV Jena enjoyed its greatest success in 2010 when it reached the final of the DFB-Pokal, narrowly losing 1–0 to FCR 2001 Duisburg. The club maintained its Bundesliga status for a decade before being relegated at the end of the 2017–18 season.

In the 2018–19 season, Jena finished fourth in the 2. Bundesliga, but with higher-ranked reserve teams ineligible for promotion, FF USV was promoted back to the top flight. Financial struggles followed, with reports indicating a budget shortfall in 2018, prompting fan-led fundraising efforts. Amid ongoing financial difficulties and organizational shifts, the club announced in May 2020 that all women's teams and competition licenses would be transferred to FC Carl Zeiss Jena, effective July 1, 2020. This marked the end of FF USV Jena as an independent club.

=== FC Carl Zeiss Jena ===
Carl Zeiss Jena had already entered women's football in 2017 by taking over USV Jena's third team, which competed in the Thüringenliga and won promotion in its third season. Following financial challenges and relegation in 2018, FF USV Jena formally merged with FC Carl Zeiss Jena on 1 July 2020, transferring all teams and playing rights.

In the 2020–21 season, Carl Zeiss Jena competed in the 2. Bundesliga Nord under coach Anne Pochert and achieved immediate promotion to the Frauen-Bundesliga. However, the 2021–22 campaign ended with relegation after the team finished last. Following this, the club restructured its women's department, appointing Isabelle Knipp as sporting director and hiring former FF USV Jena manager Steffen Beck as head coach. In 2023–24, the club finished runners-up in the second division, securing promotion back to the Bundesliga.

== Current squad ==
As of 12 July 2026

Note: Flags indicate national team as defined under FIFA eligibility rules; some limited exceptions apply. Players may hold more than one non-FIFA nationality.

No.	Pos.	Nation	Player
1	GK	GER	Jasmin Janning
10	DF	GER	Emily Reske
16	DF	GER	Lisa Gora
17	FW	GER	Rieke Tietz
19	MF	GER	Lea Mauly
20	MF	GER	Hannah Lehmann
24	GK	GER	Laura Kiontke
27	DF	GER	Gwen Mummert
31	DF	GER	Nelly Juckel
33	MF	GER	Anne Rotzinger
36	FW	FIN	Anna Olmala
—	MF	HUN	Napsugar Sinka

No.	Pos.	Nation	Player
—	MF	SUI	Sarah Frischknecht
—	DF	AUT	Valentina Kroll
—	MF	GER	Sarah Wiesner
—	MF	GER	Emily Hähnel
—	DF	SUI	Mia Knapp
—	FW	GER	Sarah Preuss
—	MF	GER	Annika Wohner
—	MF	GER	Gina Ebels
—	DF	DEN	Laura Lillholm
—	MF	GER	Paula Rintzner (on loan from Union Berlin)
—	MF	GER	Emma Broddheimer (on loan from VfL Wolfsburg)

== Staff ==
Coaching staff
(Germany) Florian Kästner	Head coach
(Germany) Matthias Buszkowiak	Assistant coach
(Germany) Luis Urbig	Goalkeeping coach
(Germany) Mikkeline Braun	Fitness coach

== Notable players ==
- (Germany) Anna Blässe
- (Germany) Griseldis Meißner
- (Germany) Jana Burmeister
- (Germany) Kathleen Radtke
- (Germany) Kathrin Längert
- (Germany) Melanie Groll
- (Germany) Steffi Scheitler
- (Germany) Susann Utes
- (Germany) Sylvia Arnold
- (Germany) Tessa Rinkes
- (Germany) Carolin Schiewe
- (Germany) Ivonne Hartmann
- (Germany) Sabrina Schmutzler
- (East Germany) Doreen Meier
- (East Germany) Heidi Vater
- (East Germany) Petra Weschenfelder
- (Austria) Nike Winter
- (Brazil) Carol Carioca
- (Cameroon) Crystelle-Ida Ngnipoho-Pokam
- (Canada) Amelia Pietrangelo
- (Canada) Erin McLeod
- (Canada) Shannon Woeller
- (Canada) Tiffany Cameron
- (Croatia) Iva Landeka
- (Equatorial Guinea) Genoveva Añonma
- (Ghana) Adjoa Bayor
- (Netherlands) Mirte Roelvink
- (New Zealand) Aimee Phillips
- (New Zealand) Amber Hearn
- (New Zealand) Ria Percival
- (New Zealand) Abby Erceg
- (Portugal) Dolores Silva
- (Portugal) Laura Luís
- (Puerto Rico) Jackie Cruz
- (Slovenia) Fata Salkunič
- (Switzerland) Stenia Michel
- (Switzerland) Lara Keller
- (United States) Hannah Keane

== Notable managers ==
- (Germany) Heidi Vater
- (Germany) Martina Voss-Tecklenburg
- (Germany) Hugo Weschenfelder
- (Germany) Thorsten Zaunmüller
- (Germany) Daniel Kraus
- (Germany) Katja Greulich
- (Germany) Steffen Beck
