= Sylvia Arnold =

German footballer (born 1990)

Personal information
- Date of birth: 10 November 1990 (age 35)
- Place of birth: Dresden, Germany
- Height: 1.71 m (5 ft 7 in)
- Position: Midfielder

Youth career
- SG 90 Braunsdorf
- –2006: 1. FFC Fortuna Dresden-Rähnitz

Senior career*
Years	Team	Apps	(Gls)
2006–2012	FF USV Jena	109	(25)
2012–2017	SC Freiburg	61	(8)
2016–2017	SC Freiburg II	11	(4)
2017–2019	SC Sand	35	(4)

International career
2009	Germany U19	5	(1)
2009–2010	Germany U20	11	(3)
- * Club domestic league appearances and goals

Sylvia Arnold (born 10 November 1990) is a German former footballer who played for SC Freiburg.

== International career ==
A under-19 international, Arnold won the 2010 U-20 World Cup.

== Personal life ==
Sylvia's twin sister Julia Arnold was also a professional footballer.

== Honours ==
Germany U20

- FIFA U-20 Women's World Cup: 2010
