= Marina Makanza =

French footballer (born 1991)

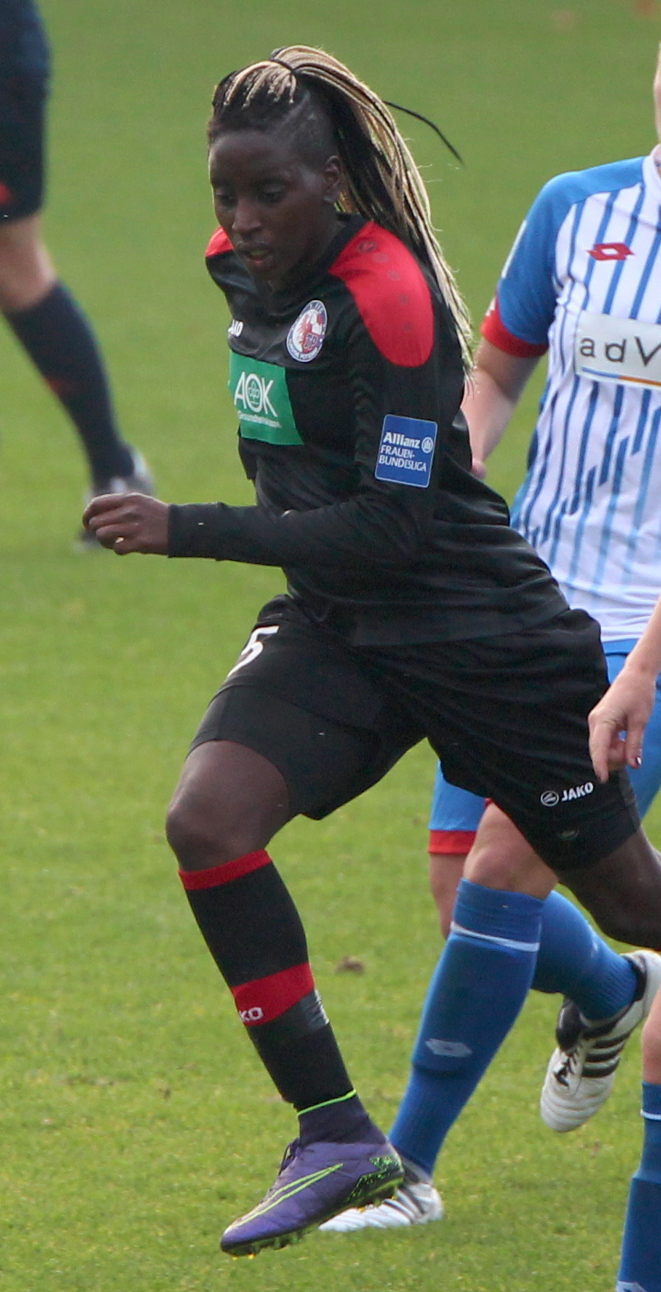
- Makanza in 2015

Personal information
- Full name: Marina Makanza
- Date of birth: 1 July 1991 (age 35)
- Place of birth: La Tronche, France
- Height: 1.66 m (5 ft 5 in)
- Position: Striker

Team information
- Current team: FC Fleury 91
- Number: 7

Youth career
- 2001–2002: Grenoble Mistral
- 2002–2005: Grenoble
- 2005–2007: Claix Foot

Senior career*
Years	Team	Apps	(Gls)
2007–2008	Claix Foot	16	(12)
2008–2010	Saint-Étienne	37	(8)
2010–2013	Freiburg	33	(6)
2013–2015	Montpellier	39	(12)
2015	Turbine Potsdam	9	(2)
2016	Nîmes	3	(0)
2016–2019	Paris FC	38	(4)
2019–2021	FC Fleury 91	28	(7)
2021–2022	Olympique de Marseille		
2022–	AS Monaco		

International career^{‡}
2006–2008	France U17	25	(11)
2009–2010	France U19	18	(3)
2010	France U20	4	(4)
2012–	France	15	(0)
- * Club domestic league appearances and goals as of 1 February 2020 (UTC) ‡ National team caps and goals as of 21 September 2016 (UTC)

Marina Makanza (born 1 July 1991 in La Tronche) is a French football player who plays as a striker for AS Monaco and has represented the France women's national football team.

== Career ==
On 19 July 2021, Makanza was announced at Olympique de Marseille.

During the first leg of the promotion playoffs, Makanza scored a brace to win the game, and was part of the AS Monaco side that was promoted to the Division 3 Féminine in 2024.
