= Helen Ukaonu =

Nigerian footballer (born 1991)

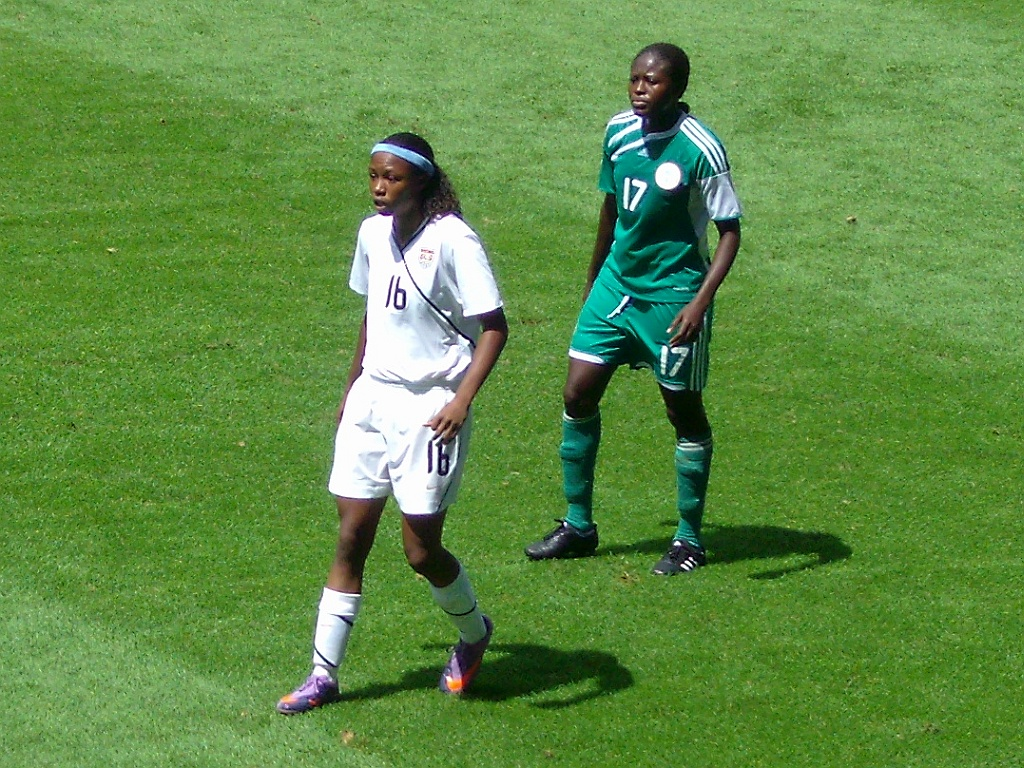
- Maya Hayes and Helen Ukaonu in 2010
- Born: 17 May 1991 (age 35); Abuja

Helen Ukaonu (born 17 May 1991, Abuja) is a Nigerian female football player.

After four seasons at Sunnanå SK, Ukaona's contract was not renewed in December 2014.
