= Elísabet Gunnarsdóttir =

Icelandic footballer and coach

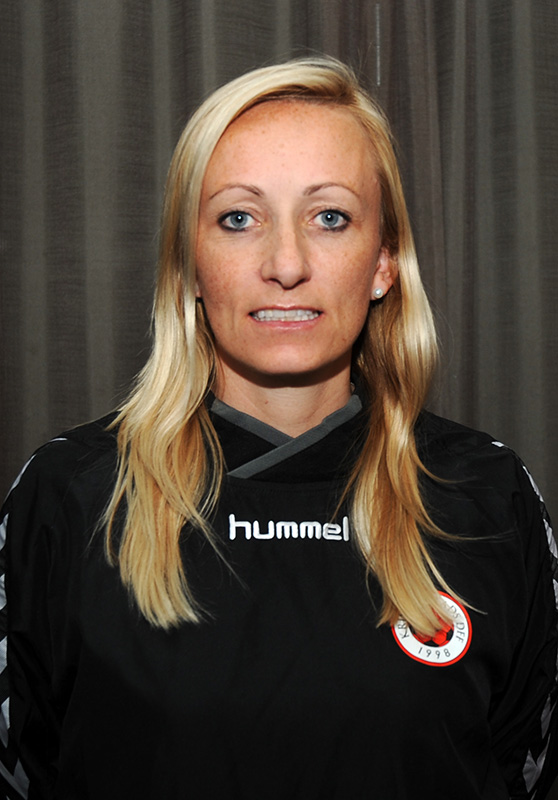
- Elísabet in 2014

Personal information
- Date of birth: 2 October 1976 (age 50)
- Place of birth: Reykjavík, Iceland

Senior career*
Years	Team	Apps	(Gls)
1993–1994	Valur	5	(0)
1995	Stjarnan	9	(0)
1997–1998	Valur	22	(0)

Managerial career
- 2002: ÍBV
- 2004–2008: Valur
- 2005–2006: Iceland (assistant)
- 2005–2006: Iceland U-21
- 2009–2023: Kristianstads DFF
- 2025–: Belgium
- * Club domestic league appearances and goals

Elísabet Gunnarsdóttir (born 2 October 1976) is an Icelandic football coach and former player. She managed Swedish Damallsvenskan club Kristianstads DFF. Elísabet was the head coach of the Icelandic Úrvalsdeild kvenna team Valur for five seasons from 2003 to 2008, during which her team won four league titles and one cup title. From 2009 to 2023, Elísabet was the manager of Kristianstads DFF in the Swedish Damallsvenskan.

== Playing career ==
Elísabet started with Valur FC as a youth player and progressed to the senior team before moving to Stjarnan in 1995 and playing two seasons with the club. She then rejoined her mother club Valur FC in 1997 and played until 2001 when she decided to retire and take over IBV in the highest women´s league as the head coach. At the age of 24 years, Elísabet became the youngest ever female to work as a head coach in the highest division.

== Coaching career ==
=== Youth teams ===
Elísabet got her start in coaching at the age of 16 when she joined the youth program at Valur FC as an assistant coach. For nine years she coached different age groups at the club and played a big part in building one of the most organized and successful youth programs on the women's side in Iceland. She won many national trophies with her youth teams and was named Iceland's 1999 youth team coach of the year.

=== Senior teams ===
In 2001 Elísabet left her mother club Valur FC for the opportunity of coaching ÍBV in the Úrvalsdeild kvenna. After one year with ÍBV she took over Breiðablik's under-19 team and guided them to the Icelandic championship. In 2003, she was hired by Valur as the senior team's head coach, winning the club's first league title in 15 years and being named the 2003 Coach of the Year. Elísabet remained Valur's head coach for five consecutive seasons, leading the team to four league titles and one cup title. She took the team all the way to the quarter finals of the 2005–06 UEFA Women's Cup. Elísabet is known for making high-profile transfers for her teams and brought players like German world champion Viola Odebrecht and Scottish Julie Fleeting to Iceland to play for her at Valur FC.

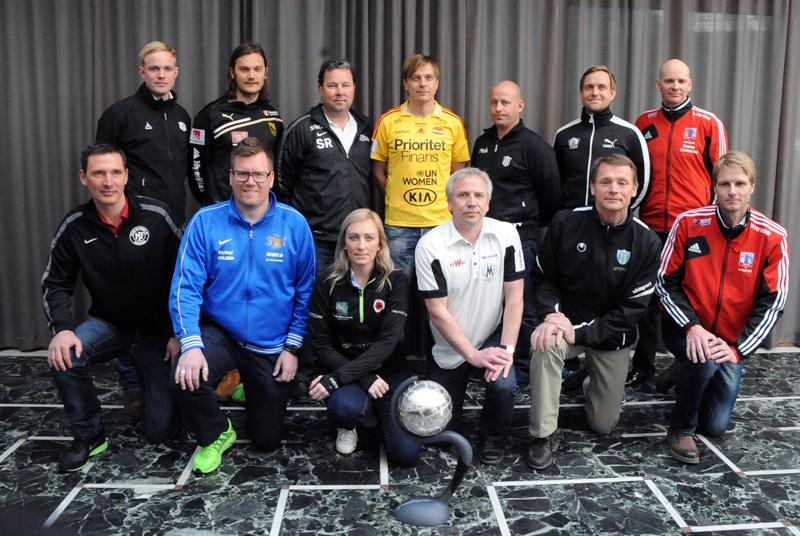
As the only female trainer in Damallsvenskan, 2013

Elísabet moved to Sweden in January 2009 to take over Kristianstads DFF of the Swedish Damallsvenskan. Through her time at the club Kristiantads DFF has signed some big names including Icelandic stars Margrét Lára Viðarsdóttir and Sif Atladóttir, Danish international Johanna Rasmussen and Swedish stars Hedvig Lindahl (sold to Chelsea 2015), Kosovare Asllani (sold to PSG 2012) and Josefine Öqvist (sold to Montpellier 2013). In September 2012 Elísabet signed a new two-year contract with the club.

In August 2014, Marija Banušić gave Kristianstads the lead in the Svenska Cupen (English: Swedish Cup) final, but Elísabet's team were defeated 2–1 by Linköpings FC.

In November 2023, she stepped down as the manager of Kristianstads after 15 years at the helm.

=== National teams ===
Elísabet served as an assistant to Jörundur Áki Sveinsson for the Icelandic women's national team and was also the head coach for the U-21 national team from 2005 til the end of 2006. She managed Iceland for two games in 2006 when Jörundur was suspended. In January 2025 she became head coach of the Belgian national Women's team 'the red flames'. She signed until the worldcup in 2027.

When Freyr Alexandersson—Elísabet's former assistant and successor at Valur—was named Icelandic women's team coach in 2013, she agreed to scout opposition teams on his behalf.

In 2025 she was named head coach of the Belgian Red Flames.

== Personal life ==
In 2013, Elísabet appeared in the Sveriges Television documentary television series The Other Sport.

== Honours ==
In 2024, Elísabet was awarded the Order of the Falcon for her contributions to women's soccer and other sports.

=== Manager ===
Valur

- Úrvalsdeild kvenna: 2004, 2006, 2007, 2008
- Icelandic Cup: 2006

=== Individual ===
- Úrvalsdeild kvenna Coach of the year: 2004, 2006, 2007, 2008
- Damallsvenskan Coach of the year: 2017, 2020; runner-up 2012
- Svenska Cupen Damer runner-up: 2014, 2019
