= Ebere Orji =

Nigerian footballer

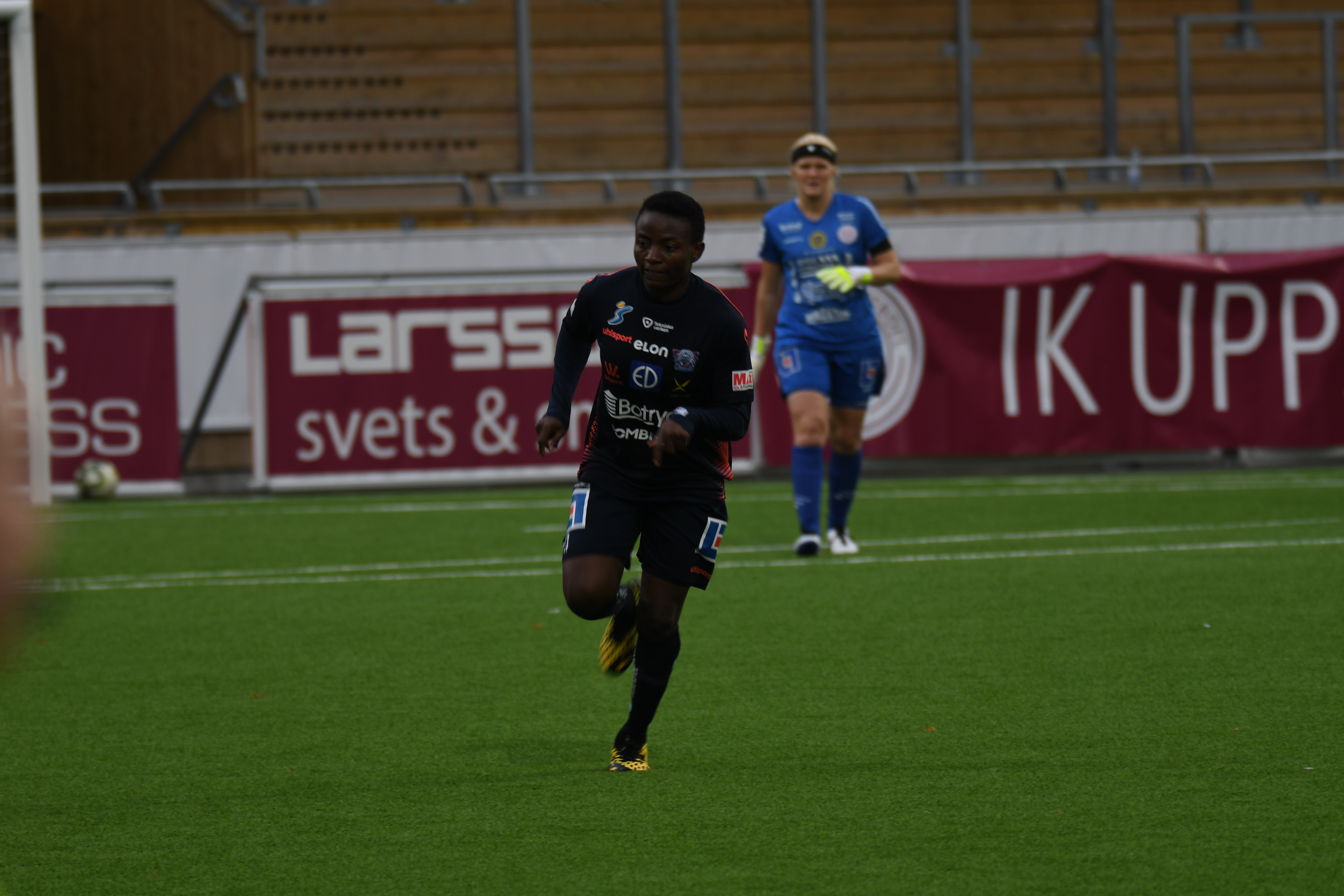
- Orji in 2020

Personal information
- Date of birth: 23 December 1992 (age 33)
- Place of birth: Enugu, Nigeria
- Height: 1.66 m (5 ft 5 in)
- Position: Striker

Team information
- Current team: Sundsvall DFF
- Number: 3

Youth career
- 2005-2008: Bayelsa Queens

Senior career*
Years	Team	Apps	(Gls)
2009	Delta Queens		
2010-2012	Rivers Angels		
2013	Bayelsa Queens		
2014	Rivers Angels		
2014–2017	Ferencváros		
2017	Umeå	8	(5)
2018	Mallbacken	24	(10)
2019	Umeå	26	(11)
2020	Linköpings	22	(6)
2021	IFK Kalmar	5	(0)
2021-	Sundsvall DFF	13	(5)

International career^{‡}
2008	Nigeria U-17s	3	(1)
2008-2012	Nigeria U-20s	15	(5)
2011	Nigeria	3	(0)
- * Club domestic league appearances and goals ‡ National team caps and goals as of 28 June 2020

Ebere Orji // (born 23 December 1992) is a Nigerian international footballer who plays as a striker for Sundsvall DFF in the Swedish Elitettan. She has previously played for multiple clubs in Nigeria, Sweden and Hungary but most notably for Ferencváros in the Hungarian Női NB I and Rivers Angels in her home country in the Nigeria Women Premier League. She has also represented Nigeria at international level as part of the team at the 2011 FIFA Women's World Cup finals, as well as the Under 20 and Under 17 World Cup.

== Club career ==
While playing for Rivers Angels, Ebere Orji scored a hat-trick in a 6–1 victory over COD United Ladies, a key performance that helped propel the team toward ultimately winning the Federation Cup in 2014.

In 2015 with Ferencváros, she won both the Hungarian championship (Női NB I) and the Hungarian Cup. In the 2016–17 season, Orji ended as top goalscorer in the Női NB I with 27 goals.

In 2019 Orji won the Elitettan title with Umeå IK, scoring 11 goals in 26 league games.

== International career ==
At the age of 15, Orji made her international debut for Nigeria women's under-17s in the inaugural U-17 Women's World Cup in 2008 in a 2–1 win against South Korea in the group stage. Orji scored her first international goal for the under-17s in the same tournament in a 2–2 draw with Brazil., but was "very disappointed" to have been later sent off in the same game. 17 days after being sent off against Brazil, Orji was again representing Nigeria, this time at under-20 level at the 2008 under-20 Women's World Cup. Orji scored on her first appearance for the team in a 1–1 draw with England and then scored twice more as the Falconets were knocked out at the quarter final stage by France in a 2–3 defeat.

"This was my best World Cup experience. To play in the final against the host was a terrific achievement and to come home with a silver medal is something I will cherish forever."

Two years later, Orji was again called up to the under-20 squad for the 2010 U-20 Women's World Cup and found greater success as part of the team that knocked defending champions USA out in the quarter finals and eventually reached the final of the competition, narrowly losing 2–0 to hosts Germany. Orji was ever-present in the team and scored twice in the tournament, once being the only goal in Nigeria's semi-final victory over Colombia.

Orji made her senior debut for Nigeria in a friendly against Germany, however she was substituted after 29 minutes and Nigeria went on to lose 8–0.

Orji was part of the Nigeria squad that won the 2010 African Women's Championship. She also made appearances at the 2012 African Women's Championship.

Her World Cup debut came at the 2011 Women's World Cup, starting in all three group stage games. Nigeria failed to make it out of the group stage.

In 2012, Orji again represented the under-20's for the 2012 U-20 Women's World Cup, appearing as a late substitute in all of Nigeria's games up until they were knocked out in the semi-final by the USA. Orji totalled 15 games for Nigeria under-20s between 2008 and 2012, scoring 5 goals.

== Honours ==
Delta Queens

- Nigeria Women Premier League: 2009
- Aiteo Cup: 2009

Rivers Angels

- Nigeria Women Premier League: 2010, 2014
- Aiteo Cup: 2010, 2011, 2012

Ferencváros

- Női NB I: 2015–16
- Női NB I: Runner-up 2016–17
- Nöi Magyar Kupa: 2015–16, 2016–17

Umeå IK

- Elitettan: 2019

Nigeria U20

- U-20 Women's World Cup runner-up: 2010

Nigeria

- African Women's Championship: 2010
