= Sabrina Schmutzler =

German footballer

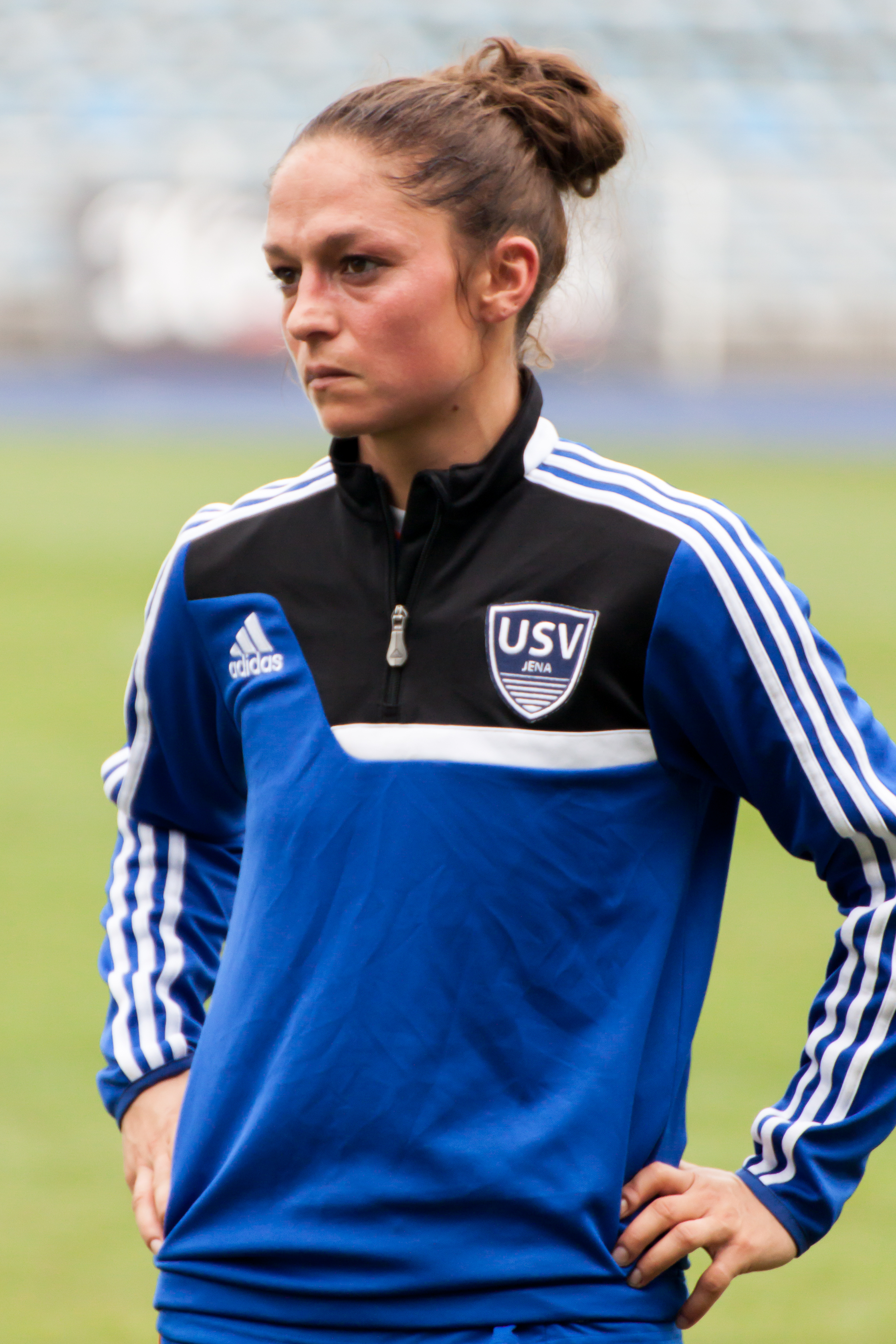
- Schmutzler in 2014

Personal information
- Full name: Sabrina Schmutzler
- Date of birth: 7 October 1984 (age 42)
- Place of birth: Gera, East Germany
- Height: 1.72 m (5 ft 8 in)
- Position: Striker

Youth career
- FC Thüringen Weida
- –2003: 1. FC Gera 03

Senior career*
Years	Team	Apps	(Gls)
2003–2015	FF USV Jena	162	(79)
2011–2015	FF USV Jena II	8	(1)
2017–2018	FC Carl Zeiss Jena	1	(0)
- * Club domestic league appearances and goals

Sabrina Schmutzler is a German football striker, currently playing for FF USV Jena in the Bundesliga. She was the 2. Bundesliga's top scorer in 2008, helping Jena reach the top category. She represented Germany in the 2007 Summer Universiade. She played 150 games in the Bundesliga, Germany's top football division.
