= Julia Arnold (footballer) =

German footballer (born 1990)

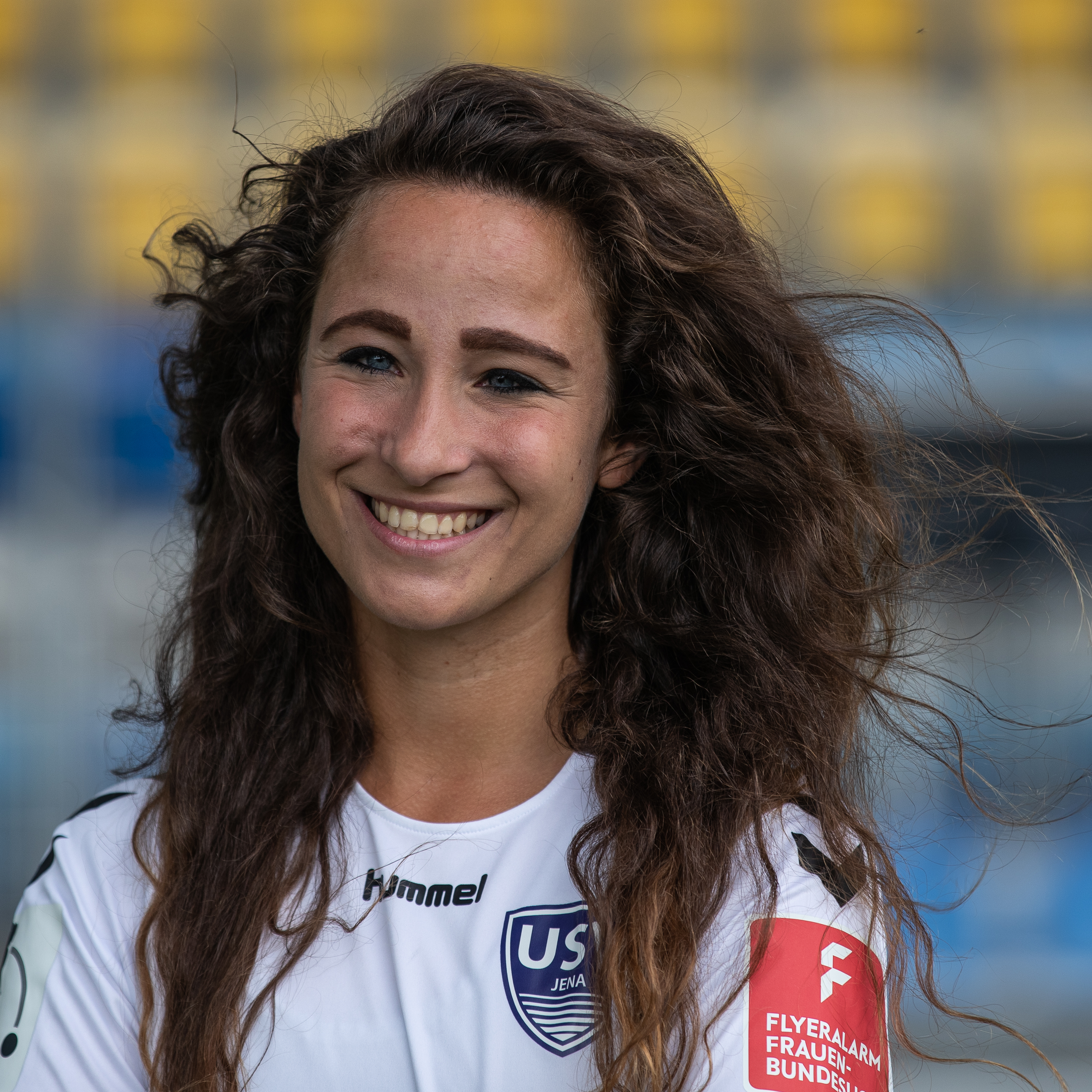
- Arnold in 2019

Personal information
- Date of birth: 10 November 1990 (age 35)
- Place of birth: Dresden, Germany
- Height: 1.69 m (5 ft 7 in)
- Position: Midfielder

Youth career
- –2006: 1. FFC Fortuna Dresden

Senior career*
Years	Team	Apps	(Gls)
2006–2017	FF USV Jena	224	(23)
2017–2018	1. FC Köln	22	(0)
2018–2024	Carl Zeiss Jena (Note: "FF USV Jena" until 2020)	88	(13)
2021–	Carl Zeiss Jena II	55	(10)
- * Club domestic league appearances and goals

Julia Arnold (born 10 November 1990) is a German footballer who played as a midfielder for Carl Zeiss Jena. Between 2017 and 2018, she played for 1. FC Köln.

== Personal life ==
Arnold has a twin sister Sylvia Arnold, who was also a professional footballer.

== Outside activities ==
Arnold is an estate agent and artist outside of professional football.
