= Mercy Tagoe =

Ghanaian association football coach

Personal information
- Date of birth: 5 February 1974 (age 52)
- Position: Defender

Senior career*
Years	Team	Apps	(Gls)
- Bluna Ladies

International career^{‡}
- Ghana

Managerial career
- 2016: Amidaus Professionals
- 2018 (interim): Ghana (women)
- 2019-2020: Hallifax Ladies
- 2019–2023: Ghana (women)
- * Club domestic league appearances and goals ‡ National team caps and goals as of 19 June 1999 (before the 1999 FIFA Women's World Cup)

Mercy Tagoe-Quarcoo (née Tagoe; born 5 February 1974) is a Ghanaian football coach and former player who played as a defender for the Ghana women's national football team. She was part of the team at the 1999 FIFA Women's World Cup in the United States. On club level she played for Bluna Ladies in Ghana.

In February 2018, she led the Black Queens to win the maiden edition to the West Africa Football Union (WAFU) in Abidjan, Côte d'Ivoire as an interim coach. Making her the first female coach to serve as an interim coach to the Black Queens.

Prior to picking up a coaching role Mercy Tagoe was a referee in the Ghana Premier League.

== Refereeing ==
She picked up refereeing in 1995. She made history as the first Ghanaian female referee to officiate at the FIFA Women's World Cup in 2007 held in China. In 2012 she quit as a referee due to more violence in the games.

== Managing ==
In 2016 she was managing the first level side Amidaus Professionals, a first for a woman in Ghana. She was leading the Ghana women's national team on an interim basis after Didi Dramani's managing spell ended. She was named full head coach in 2019.

She also coached Halifax Ladies in the Super League, but quit in 2020, to focus on the national team only.

== Award ==
In March 2021, she was awarded the sportswoman of the year in the sports category at the Entertainment Achievement Awards.
