= List of VfL Wolfsburg (women) seasons =

This is a list of seasons played by VfL Wolfsburg Frauen, VfL Wolfsburg's women's section, in German and European football, from the foundation of the first German championship, one year after the creation of the original incarnation of the team, Eintracht Wolfsburg, to the latest completed season. Eintracht was absorbed by VfL Wolfsburg in 2003.

== Summary ==
Top scorers in bold were also the top scorers in the Frauen-Bundesliga that season.

Champions	Runners-up	Promoted	Relegated

Domestic and international results of VfL Wolfsburg Frauen
Season	League										Cup	Europe		Top Goalscorer(s)	
Season	Division	Tier	Pos	P	W	D	L	F	A	Pts	Cup	Europe		Name(s)	Goals
1980–81											R16				
1981–82	FRG Championship		QF												
1983–84	FRG Championship		QF								RU				
1985–86											R16				
1986–87	FRG Championship		R16												
1988–89											R16				
1989–90	FRG Championship		QF								R16				
1990–91	Bundesliga – Nord	1	**7**	18	7	4	7	43	34	18	SF				
1991–92	Bundesliga – Nord	1	**5**	18	9	4	7	36	28	22	QF				
1992–93	Bundesliga – Nord	1	**7**	18	7	1	10	27	42	15	SF				
1993–94	Bundesliga – Nord	1	**6**	18	7	4	7	36	40	18	R16				
1994–95	Bundesliga – Nord	1	**7**	18	4	5	9	26	40	13	R16				
1995–96	Bundesliga – Nord	1	**8**	18	5	4	9	18	40	19	R16				
1996–97	Bundesliga – Nord	1	**8**	18	3	4	11	15	39	13	R16				
1997–98	Regionalliga – Nord	2	**1**	22	21	0	1	121	1	27	R64				
1998–99	Bundesliga	1	**6**	22	7	6	9	39	48	27	QF			(Germany) Bianca Mühe	11
1999–00	Bundesliga	1	**7**	22	10	5	7	46	37	35	QF			(Germany) Claudia Müller	22
2000–01	Bundesliga	1	**10**	22	5	5	12	30	48	20	QF				
2001–02	Bundesliga	1	**10**	22	5	2	15	26	52	17	R16				
2002–03	Bundesliga	1	**9**	22	6	6	10	31	48	24	QF				
2003–04	Bundesliga	1	**8**	22	8	3	11	35	55	27	R16			(Germany) Claudia Müller	16
2004–05	Bundesliga	1	**12**	22	5	2	15	26	58	17	QF			(Germany) Claudia Müller	7
2005–06	2. Bundesliga – Nord	2	**1**	22	17	4	1	80	21	55	R16				
2006–07	Bundesliga	1	**6**	22	8	3	11	20	49	27	QF			(Germany) Martina Müller	11
2007–08	Bundesliga	1	**6**	22	10	4	8	42	48	34	R32			(Germany) Shelley Thompson	16
2008–09	Bundesliga	1	**8**	22	8	3	11	53	48	27	SF			(Germany) Martina Müller	21
2009–10	Bundesliga	1	**4**	22	12	3	7	42	35	39	QF			(Germany) Martina Müller	14
2010–11	Bundesliga	1	**7**	22	10	2	10	52	46	32	R16			(Germany) Martina Müller	20
2011–12	Bundesliga	1	**2**	22	18	2	2	63	10	56	R16			(Germany) Conny Pohlers	19
2012–13	Bundesliga	1	**1**	22	17	2	3	71	16	53	**W**	Champions League	**W**	(Germany) Conny Pohlers	16
2013–14	Bundesliga	1	**1**	22	17	4	1	68	16	55	R16	Champions League	**W**	(Germany) Martina Müller	16
2014–15	Bundesliga	1	**2**	22	17	4	1	67	4	55	**W**	Champions League	SF	(Germany) Alexandra Popp	13
2015–16	Bundesliga	1	**2**	22	15	2	5	56	22	47	**W**	Champions League	RU	(Norway) C. Hansen & (Germany) A. Popp	6
2016–17	Bundesliga	1	**1**	22	17	3	2	56	14	54	**W**	Champions League	QF	(Germany) Alexandra Popp	8
2017–18	Bundesliga	1	**1**	22	18	2	2	56	8	56	**W**	Champions League	RU	(Denmark) **Pernille Harder**	17
2018–19	Bundesliga	1	**1**	22	19	2	1	94	11	59	**W**	Champions League	QF	(Poland) **Ewa Pajor**	24
2019–20	Bundesliga	1	**1**	22	20	2	0	93	8	62	**W**	Champions League	RU	(Denmark) **Pernille Harder**	27
2020–21	Bundesliga	1	**2**	22	19	2	1	71	17	59	**W**	Champions League	QF	(Hungary) Zsanett Jakabfi	11
2021–22	Bundesliga	1	**1**	22	19	2	1	82	16	59	**W**	Champions League	SF	(Germany) Tabea Waßmuth	13
2022–23	Bundesliga	1	**2**	22	19	0	3	75	17	57	**W**	Champions League	RU	(Germany) Alexandra Popp	16
2023–24	Bundesliga	1	**2**	22	17	2	3	67	19	53	**W**	Champions League	GS	(Germany) **Ewa Pajor**	18
