= List of LGBTQ women's association footballers =

This is a list of LGBTQ+ women's association footballers, including non-heterosexual female footballers (or those who have openly been in a same-sex relationship) as well as transgender and non-binary footballers of any gender who have played for a women's association football team at the level specified.

== International footballers ==
=== By nation ===
==== Argentina ====
- Lorena Benítez

==== Australia ====
- Mackenzie Arnold
- Ellie Carpenter
- Alex Chidiac
- Brianna Davey
- Caitlin Foord
- Katrina Gorry
- Michelle Heyman
- Sam Kerr
- Chloe Logarzo
- Cortnee Vine
- Sarah Walsh
- Tameka Yallop

==== Austria ====
- Manuela Zinsberger

==== Belgium ====
- Ella Van Kerkhoven
- Diede Lemey

==== Brazil ====
- Adriana
- Andressa Alves
- Bárbara
- Brena
- Debinha
- Francielle
- Marta

==== Canada ====
- Kadeisha Buchanan
- Stephanie Labbé
- Erin McLeod
- Quinn

==== Chile ====
- Natalia Campos
- Christiane Endler
- Su Helen Galaz
- Maryorie Hernández
- Francisca Moroso
- Fernanda Pinilla
- María José Urrutia
- Daniela Zamora

==== China ====
- Li Ying

==== Colombia ====
- Linda Caicedo
- Leicy Santos

==== Denmark ====
- Pernille Harder
- Dorte Dalum Jensen

==== England ====
- Georgia Stanway
- Anita Asante
- Lucy Bronze
- Jessica Carter
- Rachel Daly
- Mary Earps
- Bethany England
- Millie Turner
- Melanie Garside-Wight
- Lauren Hemp
- Fran Kirby
- Beth Mead
- Jordan Nobbs
- Lianne Sanderson
- Alex Scott
- Jill Scott
- Kelly Smith
- Demi Stokes
- Casey Stoney
- Jodie Taylor
- Keira Walsh
- Leah Williamson

==== France ====
- Camille Abily
- Sonia Bompastor
- Maëlle Lakrar
- Pauline Peyraud-Magnin
- Constance Picaud
- Marinette Pichon
- Melvine Malard

==== Germany ====
- Nadine Angerer
- Ann-Katrin Berger
- Linda Bresonik
- Sara Doorsoun
- Inka Grings
- Ursula Holl
- Svenja Huth
- Steffi Jones
- Isabel Kerschowski
- Katja Kraus
- Kim Kulig
- Lena Oberdorf
- Lea Schüller

==== Iceland ====
- Edda Garðarsdóttir
- Ólína Guðbjörg Viðarsdóttir
- Sandra Sigurðardóttir

==== Ireland ====
- Isibeal Atkinson
- Ruesha Littlejohn
- Katie McCabe
- Lucy Quinn

==== Italy ====
- Lisa Boattin
- Aurora Galli
- Manuela Giugliano
- Elena Linari
- Carolina Morace

==== Japan ====
- Kumi Yokoyama

==== Mexico ====
- Janelly Farías
- Bianca Henninger
- Stephany Mayor
- Bianca Sierra

==== Netherlands ====
- Kerstin Casparij
- Anouk Dekker
- Nathalie Geeris
- Vivianne Miedema
- Sherida Spitse
- Daniëlle van de Donk
- Stefanie van der Gragt
- Merel van Dongen

==== New Zealand ====
- Katie Duncan
- Priscilla Duncan
- Abby Erceg
- Michaela Foster
- Emma Kete
- Ria Percival
- Hannah Wilkinson
- Kirsty Yallop

==== Northern Ireland ====
- Marissa Callaghan
- Rebecca Holloway

==== Norway ====
- Isabell Herlovsen
- Frida Maanum
- Linda Medalen
- Bente Nordby
- Guro Reiten
- Anja Sønstevold
- Ingrid Syrstad Engen

==== Philippines ====
- Tahnai Annis
- Reina Bonta

==== Russia ====
- Nadezhda Karpova

==== Scotland ====
- Lisa Evans
- Shannon Lynn

==== South Africa ====
- Eudy Simelane

==== Spain ====
- Teresa Abelleira
- Ivana Andrés
- Ona Batlle
- Lola Gallardo
- Esther González
- Jenni Hermoso
- Mapi León
- Sara Mérida
- Alba Redondo
- Ana Romero
- Sandra Paños
- Irene Paredes
- Alexia Putellas

==== Sweden ====
- Anneli Andelén
- Filippa Angeldahl
- Nathalie Björn
- Lisa Dahlkvist
- Magdalena Eriksson
- Jennifer Falk
- Nilla Fischer
- Lina Hurtig
- Emma Kullberg
- Jessica Landström
- Malin Levenstad
- Hedvig Lindahl
- Victoria Sandell Svensson
- Lotta Schelin
- Caroline Seger
- Linda Sembrant
- Pia Sundhage
- Julia Zigiotti Olme

==== Switzerland ====
- Ramona Bachmann
- Alisha Lehmann
- Noelle Maritz
- Lia Wälti

==== United States ====
- Jane Campbell
- Amanda Cromwell
- Tierna Davidson
- Adrianna Franch
- Kristen Hamilton
- Ashlyn Harris
- Tobin Heath
- Natasha Kai
- Ali Krieger
- Lori Lindsey
- Joanna Lohman
- Kristie Mewis
- Kelley O'Hara
- Carson Pickett
- Christen Press
- Megan Rapinoe
- Brianna Scurry
- Abby Wambach
- Saskia Webber

==== Wales ====
- Jess Fishlock
- Angharad James
- Stephanie Williams
- Andrea Worrall
- Ffion Morgan

=== By global tournament ===
Ordered by edition chronologically, then results placement, then name alphabetically – names are duplicated, but only linked once

==== Olympic Games ====
1996

- (United States) Amanda Cromwell (gold)
- (United States) Briana Scurry (gold)
- (United States) Saskia Webber (gold)
- (Norway) Agnete Carlsen (bronze)
- (Norway) Tone Haugen (bronze)
- (Norway) Linda Medalen (bronze)
- (Norway) Bente Nordby (bronze)
- (Norway) Hege Riise (bronze)
- (Norway) Reidun Seth (bronze)
- (Norway) Heidi Støre (bronze)
- (Brazil) Formiga
- (Germany) Katja Kraus
- (Germany) Renate Lingor
- (Germany) Sandra Minnert
- (Germany) Martina Voss-Tecklenburg
- (Sweden) Pia Sundhage
- (Sweden) Lena Videkull
- (Denmark) Louise Hansen

2000

- (Norway) Bente Nordby (gold)
- (Norway) Hege Riise (gold)
- (United States) Briana Scurry (silver)
- (Germany) Nadine Angerer (bronze)
- (Germany) Inka Grings (bronze)
- (Germany) Steffi Jones (bronze)
- (Germany) Renate Lingor (bronze)
- (Germany) Sandra Minnert (bronze)
- (Brazil) Formiga
- (Sweden) Victoria Sandell Svensson
- (Sweden) Therese Sjögran
- (Australia) Cheryl Salisbury

2004

- (United States) Angela Hucles (gold)
- (United States) Briana Scurry (gold)
- (United States) Abby Wambach (gold)
- (Brazil) Cristiane (silver)
- (Brazil) Formiga (silver)
- (Brazil) Marta (silver)
- (Germany) Nadine Angerer (bronze)
- (Germany) Steffi Jones (bronze)
- (Germany) Renate Lingor (bronze)
- (Germany) Sandra Minnert (bronze)
- (Sweden) Maja Åström
- (Sweden) Hedvig Lindahl
- (Sweden) Victoria Sandell Svensson
- (Sweden) Lotta Schelin
- (Sweden) Therese Sjögran
- (Sweden) Sara Thunebro
- (Australia) Kylie Ledbrook
- (Australia) Cheryl Salisbury
- (Australia) Sally Shipard
- (Australia) Sarah Walsh
- (Greece) Tanya Kalivas

2008

- (United States) Tobin Heath (gold)
- (United States) Angela Hucles (gold)
- (United States) Natasha Kai (gold)
- (United States) Pia Sundhage (gold)
- (Brazil) Bárbara (silver)
- (Brazil) Cristiane (silver)
- (Brazil) Formiga (silver)
- (Brazil) Francielle (silver)
- (Brazil) Marta (silver)
- (Germany) Nadine Angerer (bronze)
- (Germany) Linda Bresonik (bronze)
- (Germany) Ursula Holl (bronze)
- (Germany) Renate Lingor (bronze)
- (Germany) Babett Peter (bronze)
- (Norway) Isabell Herlovsen
- (Norway) Trine Rønning
- (Norway) Ingvild Stensland
- (Norway) Elise Thorsnes
- (Canada) Diana Matheson
- (Canada) Erin McLeod
- (Canada) Melissa Tancredi
- (Canada) Rhian Wilkinson
- (Sweden) Nilla Fischer
- (Sweden) Jessica Landström
- (Sweden) Hedvig Lindahl
- (Sweden) Victoria Sandell Svensson
- (Sweden) Lotta Schelin
- (Sweden) Caroline Seger
- (Sweden) Therese Sjögran
- (Sweden) Sara Thunebro
- (New Zealand) Katie Duncan
- (New Zealand) Abby Erceg
- (New Zealand) Emma Kete
- (New Zealand) Ria Percival
- (New Zealand) Kirsty Yallop
- (Argentina) Vanina Correa

2012

- (United States) Tobin Heath (gold)
- (United States) Lori Lindsey (alternate)
- (United States) Kelley O'Hara (gold)
- (United States) Christen Press (gold)
- (United States) Megan Rapinoe (gold)
- (United States) Pia Sundhage (gold)
- (United States) Abby Wambach (gold)
- (Canada) Diana Matheson (bronze)
- (Canada) Erin McLeod (bronze)
- (Canada) Carmelina Moscato (bronze)
- (Canada) Marie-Ève Nault (bronze)
- (Canada) Melissa Tancredi (bronze)
- (Canada) Rhian Wilkinson (bronze)
- (Sweden) Lisa Dahlkvist
- (Sweden) Nilla Fischer
- (Sweden) Jessica Landström
- (Sweden) Malin Levenstad
- (Sweden) Hedvig Lindahl
- (Sweden) Lotta Schelin
- (Sweden) Caroline Seger
- (Sweden) Linda Sembrant
- (Sweden) Annica Svensson
- (Sweden) Sara Thunebro
- (United Kingdom) Anita Asante
- (United Kingdom) Karen Bardsley
- (United Kingdom) Alex Scott
- (United Kingdom) Jill Scott
- (United Kingdom) Kelly Smith
- (United Kingdom) Casey Stoney
- (United Kingdom) Fara Williams
- (Brazil) Bárbara
- (Brazil) Cristiane
- (Brazil) Debinha
- (Brazil) Formiga
- (Brazil) Francielle
- (Brazil) Marta
- (New Zealand) Katie Duncan
- (New Zealand) Abby Erceg
- (New Zealand) Annalie Longo
- (New Zealand) Erin Nayler
- (New Zealand) Ria Percival
- (New Zealand) Hannah Wilkinson
- (New Zealand) Kirsty Yallop
- (South Africa) Refiloe Jane
- (South Africa) Portia Modise
- (South Africa) Robyn Moodaly
- (South Africa) Janine van Wyk
- (Colombia) Daniela Montoya
- (Colombia) Yoreli Rincón

2016

- (Germany) Svenja Huth (gold)
- (Germany) Isabel Kerschowski (gold)
- (Germany) Babett Peter (gold)
- (Sweden) Lisa Dahlkvist (silver)
- (Sweden) Magdalena Eriksson (silver)
- (Sweden) Nilla Fischer (silver)
- (Sweden) Hedvig Lindahl (silver)
- (Sweden) Lotta Schelin (silver)
- (Sweden) Caroline Seger (silver)
- (Sweden) Linda Sembrant (silver)
- (Sweden) Pia Sundhage (silver)
- (Canada) Kadeisha Buchanan (bronze)
- (Canada) Stephanie Labbé (bronze)
- (Canada) Diana Matheson (bronze)
- (Canada) Marie-Ève Nault (alternate)
- (Canada) Quinn (bronze)
- (Canada) Melissa Tancredi (bronze)
- (Canada) Rhian Wilkinson (bronze)
- (Canada) Shelina Zadorsky (bronze)
- (Brazil) Aline
- (Brazil) Andressa Alves
- (Brazil) Bárbara
- (Brazil) Cristiane
- (Brazil) Debinha
- (Brazil) Formiga
- (Brazil) Luciana
- (Brazil) Marta
- (Brazil) Tamires
- (United States) Jill Ellis
- (United States) Ashlyn Harris
- (United States) Tobin Heath
- (United States) Ali Krieger
- (United States) Kelley O'Hara
- (United States) Christen Press
- (United States) Megan Rapinoe
- (Australia) Mackenzie Arnold
- (Australia) Ellie Carpenter
- (Australia) Larissa Crummer
- (Australia) Caitlin Foord
- (Australia) Emily Gielnik
- (Australia) Katrina Gorry
- (Australia) Michelle Heyman
- (Australia) Alanna Kennedy
- (Australia) Sam Kerr
- (Australia) Chloe Logarzo
- (Australia) Kyah Simon
- (Australia) Emily van Egmond
- (Australia) Tameka Yallop
- (France) Sandie Toletti (alternate)
- (China) Li Ying
- (New Zealand) Katie Duncan
- (New Zealand) Abby Erceg
- (New Zealand) Annalie Longo
- (New Zealand) Meikayla Moore
- (New Zealand) Erin Nayler
- (New Zealand) Ria Percival
- (New Zealand) Hannah Wilkinson
- (New Zealand) Kirsty Yallop
- (South Africa) Refiloe Jane
- (South Africa) Thembi Kgatlana
- (South Africa) Bambanani Mbane
- (South Africa) Robyn Moodaly
- (South Africa) Kaylin Swart
- (South Africa) Janine van Wyk
- (Colombia) Leicy Santos

2020

- (Canada) Kadeisha Buchanan (gold)
- (Canada) Stephanie Labbé (gold)
- (Canada) Erin McLeod (gold)
- (Canada) Bev Priestman (gold)
- (Canada) Quinn (gold)
- (Canada) Kailen Sheridan (gold)
- (Canada) Shelina Zadorsky (gold)
- (Sweden) Filippa Angeldahl (silver)
- (Sweden) Hanna Bennison (silver)
- (Sweden) Nathalie Björn (silver)
- (Sweden) Magdalena Eriksson (silver)
- (Sweden) Jennifer Falk (silver)
- (Sweden) Lina Hurtig (silver)
- (Sweden) Emma Kullberg (silver)
- (Sweden) Hedvig Lindahl (silver)
- (Sweden) Caroline Seger (silver)
- (United States) Jane Campbell (bronze)
- (United States) Tierna Davidson (bronze)
- (United States) Adrianna Franch (bronze)
- (United States) Tobin Heath (bronze)
- (United States) Kristie Mewis (bronze)
- (United States) Kelley O'Hara (bronze)
- (United States) Christen Press (bronze)
- (United States) Megan Rapinoe (bronze)
- (Australia) Mackenzie Arnold
- (Australia) Ellie Carpenter
- (Australia) Caitlin Foord
- (Australia) Emily Gielnik
- (Australia) Alanna Kennedy
- (Australia) Sam Kerr
- (Australia) Chloe Logarzo
- (Australia) Teagan Micah
- (Australia) Hayley Raso
- (Australia) Kyah Simon
- (Australia) Emily van Egmond
- (Australia) Tameka Yallop
- (Netherlands) Anouk Dekker
- (Netherlands) Sisca Folkertsma
- (Netherlands) Vivianne Miedema
- (Netherlands) Sherida Spitse
- (Netherlands) Daniëlle van de Donk
- (Netherlands) Stefanie van der Gragt
- (Netherlands) Shanice van de Sanden
- (Netherlands) Merel van Dongen
- (Netherlands) Lynn Wilms
- (Brazil) Aline
- (Brazil) Andressa Alves
- (Brazil) Bárbara
- (Brazil) Debinha
- (Brazil) Formiga
- (Brazil) Geyse
- (Brazil) Letícia Izidoro
- (Brazil) Marta
- (Brazil) Pia Sundhage
- (Brazil) Tamires
- (United Kingdom) Lucy Bronze
- (United Kingdom) Rachel Daly
- (United Kingdom) Lauren Hemp
- (United Kingdom) Sophie Ingle
- (United Kingdom) Fran Kirby
- (United Kingdom) Hege Riise
- (United Kingdom) Jill Scott
- (United Kingdom) Georgia Stanway
- (United Kingdom) Demi Stokes
- (United Kingdom) Carly Telford
- (United Kingdom) Keira Walsh
- (United Kingdom) Leah Williamson
- (Chile) Yenny Acuña
- (Chile) Christiane Endler
- (Chile) Fernanda Pinilla
- (New Zealand) Abby Erceg
- (New Zealand) Annalie Longo
- (New Zealand) Meikayla Moore
- (New Zealand) Erin Nayler
- (New Zealand) Ria Percival
- (New Zealand) Hannah Wilkinson

2024

- (United States) Jane Campbell (gold)
- (United States) Tierna Davidson (gold)
- (Brazil) Adriana (silver)
- (Brazil) Lauren (Brazilian footballer) (silver)
- (Brazil) Lorena (silver)
- (Brazil) Luciana (silver)
- (Brazil) Marta (silver)
- (Brazil) Tainá (silver)
- (Brazil) Tamires (silver)
- (Brazil) Tarciane (silver)
- (Germany) Ann-Katrin Berger (bronze)
- (Germany) Sara Doorsoun (bronze)
- (Germany) Felicitas Rauch (bronze)
- (Germany) Lea Schüller (bronze)
- (Spain) Teresa Abelleira
- (Spain) Ona Batlle
- (Spain) Cata Coll
- (Spain) Jenni Hermoso
- (Spain) Irene Paredes
- (Spain) Alexia Putellas
- (Spain) Alba Redondo
- (Colombia) Wendy Bonilla (alternate)
- (Colombia) Linda Caicedo
- (Colombia) Daniela Montoya
- (Colombia) Leicy Santos
- (Canada) Kadeisha Buchanan
- (Canada) Quinn
- (Canada) Kailen Sheridan
- (Canada) Shelina Zadorsky
- (France) Maëlle Lakrar
- (France) Pauline Peyraud-Magnin
- (France) Constance Picaud
- (France) Sandie Toletti
- (Australia) Mackenzie Arnold
- (Australia) Ellie Carpenter
- (Australia) Caitlin Foord
- (Australia) Sharn Freier
- (Australia) Katrina Gorry
- (Australia) Michelle Heyman
- (Australia) Alanna Kennedy
- (Australia) Teagan Micah
- (Australia) Hayley Raso
- (Australia) Emily van Egmond
- (Australia) Cortnee Vine
- (Australia) Tameka Yallop
- (New Zealand) Michaela Foster
- (New Zealand) Annalie Longo
- (New Zealand) Meikayla Moore

== Other professional footballers ==
Ordered by career start chronologically

Name	Nationality	Career	Notes & references
Lily Parr	England	1920–1951	
Macarena Sánchez	Argentina	2006–	
Lisa Hurtig	Sweden	2007–	
Toni Pressley	United States	2008–	
Clara Markstedt	Sweden	2010–	
McKenzie Berryhill	United States	2010–	
Keelin Winters	United States	2011–	
Ashleigh Neville	England	2011–	
Emma Lennartsson	Sweden	2013–	
Abbey-Leigh Stringer	England	2014–	
Claudia Walker	England	2014–	
Carmen Menayo	Spain	2014–	
Naomi Hartley	England	2018–	
Charlotte McLean	Australia	2020–	
Mara Gómez	Argentina	2022–	
