= Inka Grings =

Retired German international footballer (born 1978)

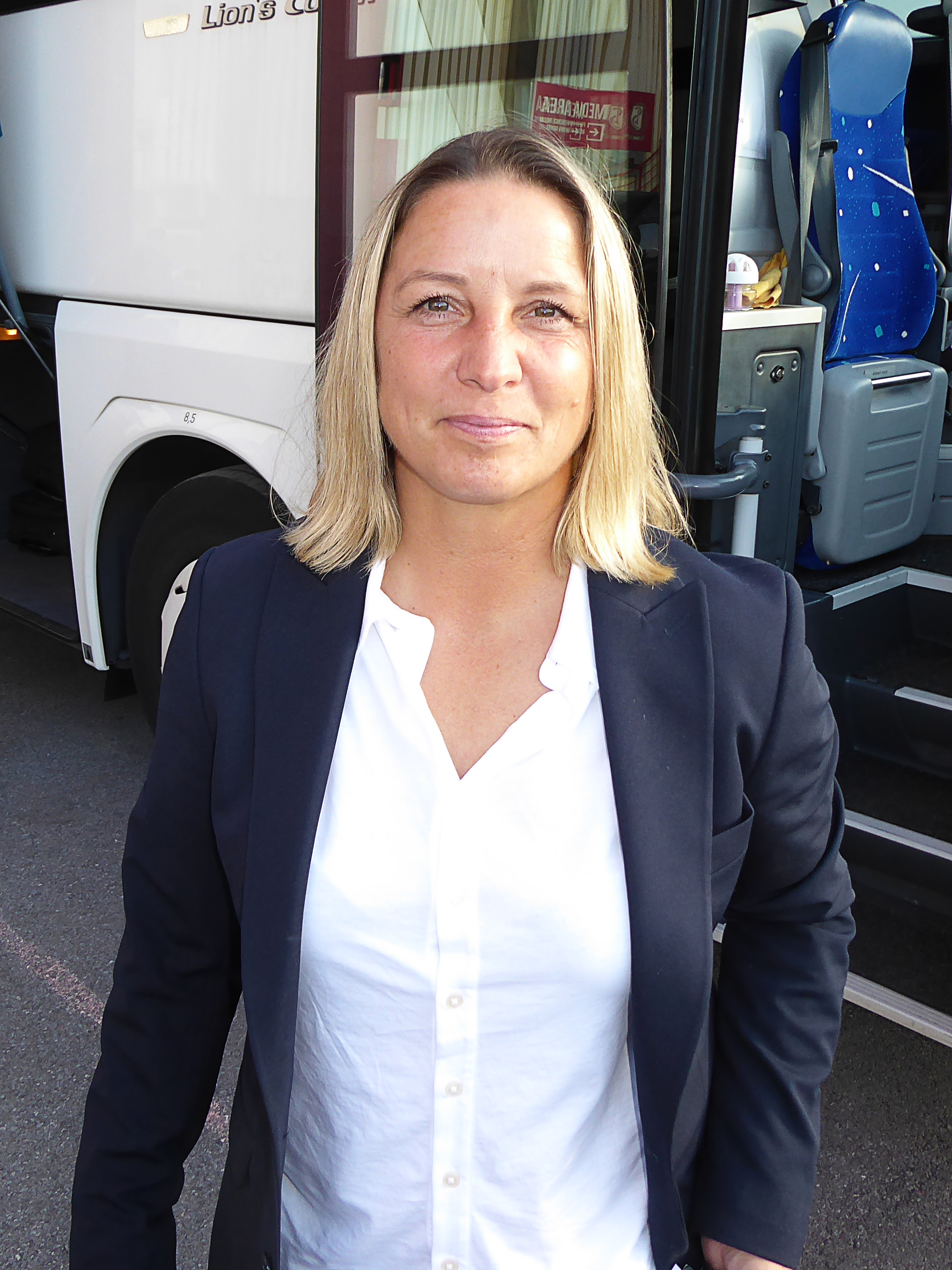
- Grings in 2024

Personal information
- Full name: Inka Grings
- Date of birth: 31 October 1978 (age 47)
- Place of birth: Düsseldorf, West Germany
- Height: 1.69 m (5 ft 7 in)
- Position: Striker

Youth career
- 1984–1990: TSV Eller 04
- 1990–1995: Garather SV

Senior career*
Years	Team	Apps	(Gls)
1995–2011	FCR 2001 Duisburg	257	(336)
2011–2013	FC Zürich	32	(57)
2013	Chicago Red Stars	16	(3)
2013–2014	FC Köln	19	(23)
Total		324	(419)

International career
1996–2012	Germany	96	(64)

Managerial career
- 2014–2017: MSV Duisburg
- 2017–2018: Viktoria Köln U17
- 2019–2020: SV 19 Straelen
- 2021–2022: FC Zürich
- 2022–2023: Switzerland
- 2024–: Club Brugge
Medal record
Women's football
Representing Germany
Olympic Games
Bronze medal – third place	2000 Sydney	Team
UEFA Women's Championship
Gold medal – first place	2005 England	Team
Gold medal – first place	2009 Finland	Team
- * Club domestic league appearances and goals

Inka Grings (born 31 October 1978) is a German former international footballer who played as a striker. She played sixteen years for FCR 2001 Duisburg before joining FC Zürich Frauen. She also played for the Germany national team. Grings is the second all-time leading goalscorer in Germany's top division, the Frauen-Bundesliga, with 195 goals and claimed the league's top-scorer award for a record six seasons. Playing for Germany, she was the top-scorer at two UEFA European Championships. Grings was named Women's Footballer of the Year (Germany) in 1999, 2009 and 2010.

She is currently the manager of Club Brugge after previously coached FC Zürich and Switzerland national team

== Early life ==
As a child, Grings wanted to be a tennis player. However, after no tennis club had accepted her, she instead started playing football at TSV Eller 04 in 1984. She later played for Garather SV.

== Club career ==
=== Duisburg, 1995–2011 ===
Grings signed with FCR 2001 Duisburg in 1995. She quickly became an important player for the club and in the following years one of the most successful goalscorers in Germany. In 1998, Grings won the German Cup, her first major title. She scored three goals in the final against FSV Frankfurt. The following year in the 1998–99 season she became the Bundesliga's top-scorer for the first time. Grings was named Women's Footballer of the Year (Germany) in 1999 by the country's sports journalists.

Over the next decade, Grings became the Bundesliga all-time leading goalscorer, hitting the mark of 350 goals in January 2011. She won the Bundesliga title with Duisburg in the 1999–00 season; that year she also set the all-time record for goals in a Bundesliga season by scoring 38 goals. She won the German Cup on two more occasions in 2009 and 2010, and lifted the UEFA Women's Cup in the 2008–09 season. Grings was the Bundesliga top-scorer for three years in a row from 2008 to 2010 and was again voted Women's Footballer of the Year (Germany) in 2009 and 2010.

=== FC Zürich, 2011–13 ===
She ended her contract at Duisburg one year early in an agreement with the club and announced transferring to an international club. On 1 September 2011 she joined Swiss side FC Zürich Frauen. In the first season she won the championship as well as the cup.

=== Chicago Red Stars, 2013 ===
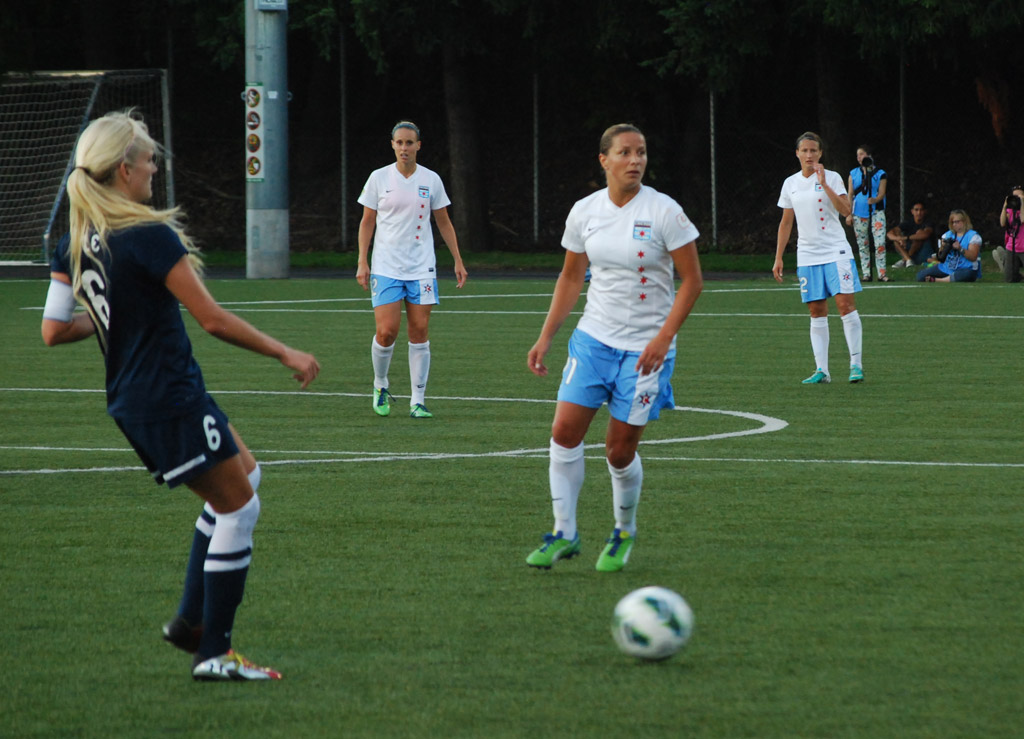
Grings during a match against Seattle Reign FC on 25 July 2013 in Tukwila, Washington.

In May 2013, Grings signed with the Chicago Red Stars for the inaugural season of the National Women's Soccer League in the United States alongside Sonja Fuss. On 4 August 2013, she scored a brace against Seattle Reign FC helping the Red Stars win 3–1. Grings was on the starting lineup in 14 of the 16 games in which she played for the Red Stars and scored three goals on the season. The Red Stars finished the 2013 season sixth in the standings with an 8–6–8 record.

She was waived by the Red Stars in September 2013.

== International career ==
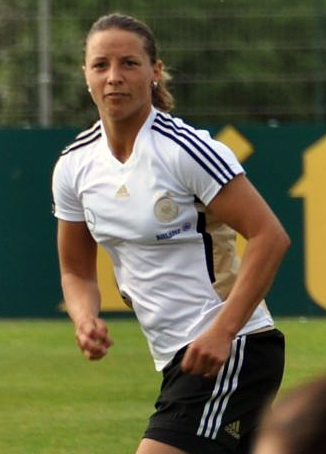
Grings with Germany in 2011

Grings made her debut for the Germany national team in May 1996 against Finland. She appeared for Germany at the 1999 FIFA Women's World Cup, scoring three goals. However, Germany was eliminated in the quarter-final. At the 2000 Summer Olympics, she won the bronze medal with the German team, scoring once against Australia in the group stage. Grings' career, particularly at international level, has repeatedly been affected by injuries. She missed the 2001 European Championship on home soil and the 2003 FIFA Women's World Cup due to injury. When she tore the anterior cruciate ligament in her knee shortly before the 2004 Summer Olympics, Grings initially announce to end her career. However, she changed her mind during physical therapy.

With four goals, Grings was the top-scorer at the 2005 European Championship, when Germany claimed its sixth European title. At the 2007 FIFA Women's World Cup and the 2008 Summer Olympics, Grings was not part of the German squad, because of disagreements with head coach Silvia Neid. She returned for Germany at the 2009 European Championship, claiming her second European title. With six goals Grings again was the tournament's top-scorer. She has been called up for the 2011 FIFA Women's World Cup.

Grings has scored 64 international goals and is ranked third behind Birgit Prinz (128) and Heidi Mohr (83) for Germany's all-time top goalscorers. During 93 appearances, she has averaged 0.69 goals per games, which makes her the team's second most prolific scorer.

== Personal life ==
Grings is openly bisexual, she had a well publicized relationship with women's team colleague Linda Bresonik, and also dated male Holger Fach, former head coach of VfL Wolfsburg.

== Career statistics ==
=== Club ===
Appearances and goals by club, season and competition
Club	Season	League			Cup		Continental		Total	
Club	Season	Division	Apps	Goals	Apps	Goals	Apps	Goals	Apps	Goals
Duisburg	1995–96	Frauen-Bundesliga	18	11	0	0	0	0	18	11
Duisburg	1996–97	Frauen-Bundesliga	18	14	1	0	0	0	19	14
Duisburg	1997–98	Frauen-Bundesliga	14	13	1+	3+	0	0	15+	16+
Duisburg	1998–99	Frauen-Bundesliga	19	25	1	0	0	0	20	25
Duisburg	1999–00	Frauen-Bundesliga	21	38	0	0	0	0	21	38
Duisburg	2000–01	Frauen-Bundesliga	15	16	0	0	0	0	15	16
Duisburg	2001–02	Frauen-Bundesliga	11	11	0	0	0	0	11	11
Duisburg	2002–03	Frauen-Bundesliga	19	20	3+	2+	0	0	21+	22+
Duisburg	2003–04	Frauen-Bundesliga	9	11	0	0	0	0	9	11
Duisburg	2004–05	Frauen-Bundesliga	15	25	0	0	0	0	15	25
Duisburg	2005–06	Frauen-Bundesliga	17	27	0	0	0	0	17	27
Duisburg	2006–07	Frauen-Bundesliga	14	22	3	2	0	0	17	24
Duisburg	2007–08	Frauen-Bundesliga	20	27	5	11	0	0	25	38
Duisburg	2008–09	Frauen-Bundesliga	19	29	1	2	9	12	29	43
Duisburg	2009–10	Frauen-Bundesliga	21	28	5	5	8	9	32	42
Duisburg	2010–11	Frauen-Bundesliga	19	23	3	5	8	13	30	41
Duisburg	Total		270	340	23+	30+	25	34	318+	404+
Zürich	2011–12	Swiss Women's Super League	13	18	2+	4+	0	0	15	21
Zürich	2012–13	Swiss Women's Super League	20	40	5	12	4	4	29	56
Zürich	Total		33	58	7+	16+	4	4	44+	77+
Chicago Red Stars	2013	National Women's Soccer League	16	3	0	0	0	0	16	3
Chicago Red Stars	Total		16	3	0	0	0	0	16	3
FC Köln	2013–14	2. Frauen-Bundesliga	19	23	3	2	0	0	22	25
FC Köln	Total		19	23	3	2	0	0	22	25
Career total			327	422	33+	46+	29	38	406+	506+

=== International ===
Scores and results list Germany's goal tally first, score column indicates score after each Grings goal.

List of international goals scored by Inka Grings
No.	Date	Venue	Opponent	Score	Result	Competition
1	28 May 1998	?	New Zealand	2–0	8–0	Friendly
2	28 May 1998	?	New Zealand	6–0	8–0	Friendly
3	28 May 1998	?	New Zealand	8–0	8–0	Friendly
4	28 June 1998	Soldier Field, Chicago, United States	United States	1–3	2–4	Friendly
5	22 April 1999	Ludwigsparkstadion, Saarbrücken, Germany	Denmark	1–0	3–1	Friendly
6	30 May 1999	Städtisches Sportzentrum Nonnenholz, Weil am Rhein, Germany	France	1–1	4–1	Friendly
7	30 May 1999	Städtisches Sportzentrum Nonnenholz, Weil am Rhein, Germany	France	3–1	4–1	Friendly
8	3 June 1999	Stadion Rheinbach im Freizeitpark, Rheinbach, Germany	Netherlands	1–0	2–0	Friendly
9	24 June 1999	Civic Stadium, Portland, Oregon, United States	Mexico	1–0	6–0	1999 FIFA Women's World Cup
10	24 June 1999	Civic Stadium, Portland, Oregon, United States	Mexico	4–0	6–0	1999 FIFA Women's World Cup
11	24 June 1999	Civic Stadium, Portland, Oregon, United States	Mexico	6–0	6–0	1999 FIFA Women's World Cup
12	2 September 1999	Sternquell Arena, Plauen, Germany	Russia	3–1	3–1	Friendly
13	23 September 1999	Playmobil-Stadion, Fürth, Germany	Ukraine	1–0	3–0	UEFA Women's Euro 2001 qualifying
14	23 September 1999	Playmobil-Stadion, Fürth, Germany	Ukraine	2–0	3–0	UEFA Women's Euro 2001 qualifying
15	14 October 1999	Marschweg-Stadion, Oldenburg, Germany	Iceland	1–0	5–0	UEFA Women's Euro 2001 qualifying
16	11 November 1999	Stadio Mario Lancellotta, Isernia, Italy	Italy	2–0	4–4	UEFA Women's Euro 2001 qualifying
17	11 November 1999	Stadio Mario Lancellotta, Isernia, Italy	Italy	3–1	4–4	UEFA Women's Euro 2001 qualifying
18	6 April 2000	Stadion am Bornheimer Hang, Frankfurt, Germany	Italy	2–0	3–0	UEFA Women's Euro 2001 qualifying
19	11 May 2000	NSC Olimpiyskiy, Kyiv, Ukraine	Ukraine	4–1	6–1	UEFA Women's Euro 2001 qualifying
20	16 July 2000	Bremer Brücke, Osnabrück, Germany	China	1–1	1–3	Friendly
21	27 August 2000	Old Tivoli, Aachen, Germany	Denmark	1–0	7–0	Friendly
22	27 August 2000	Old Tivoli, Aachen, Germany	Denmark	2–0	7–0	Friendly
23	13 September 2000	Bruce Stadium, Canberra, Australia	Australia	1–0	3–0	2000 Summer Olympics
24	4 May 2002	Estádio Adelino Ribeiro Novo, Barcelos, Portugal	Portugal	7–0	8–0	2003 FIFA Women's World Cup qualifying
25	14 November 2002	Nattenberg Stadion, Lüdenscheid, Germany	Russia	2–0	4–0	Friendly
26	6 March 2003	Sportzentrum Große Wiese, Arnsberg, Germany	China	3–0	3–1	Friendly
27	27 March 2003	Karl-Liebknecht-Stadion, Potsdam, Germany	Scotland	2–0	5–0	UEFA Women's Euro 2005 qualifying
28	27 March 2003	Karl-Liebknecht-Stadion, Potsdam, Germany	Scotland	3–0	5–0	UEFA Women's Euro 2005 qualifying
29	27 March 2003	Karl-Liebknecht-Stadion, Potsdam, Germany	Scotland	4–0	5–0	UEFA Women's Euro 2005 qualifying
30	7 February 2004	Estádio Municipal de Albufeira, Albufeira, Portugal	Portugal	3–0	11–0	UEFA Women's Euro 2005 qualifying
31	7 February 2004	Estádio Municipal de Albufeira, Albufeira, Portugal	Portugal	6–0	11–0	UEFA Women's Euro 2005 qualifying
32	7 February 2004	Estádio Municipal de Albufeira, Albufeira, Portugal	Portugal	7–0	11–0	UEFA Women's Euro 2005 qualifying
33	7 February 2004	Estádio Municipal de Albufeira, Albufeira, Portugal	Portugal	8–0	11–0	UEFA Women's Euro 2005 qualifying
34	7 February 2004	Estádio Municipal de Albufeira, Albufeira, Portugal	Portugal	9–0	11–0	UEFA Women's Euro 2005 qualifying
35	21 April 2005	Stadion an der Bremer Brücke, Osnabrück, Germany	Canada	3–1	3–1	Friendly
36	9 June 2005	Halliwell Jones Stadium, Warrington, England	France	1–0	3–0	UEFA Women's Euro 2005
37	15 June 2005	Deepdale, Preston, England	Finland	1–0	4–1	UEFA Women's Euro 2005
38	15 June 2005	Deepdale, Preston, England	Finland	3–0	4–1	UEFA Women's Euro 2005
39	19 June 2005	Ewood Park, Blackburn, England	Norway	1–0	3–1	UEFA Women's Euro 2005
40	25 September 2005	Leimbachstadion, Siegen, Germany	Russia	2–0	5–1	2007 FIFA Women's World Cup qualifying
41	20 October 2005	Hans-Walter-Wild-Stadion, Bayreuth, Germany	Scotland	1–0	4–0	2007 FIFA Women's World Cup qualifying
42	25 February 2009	Bielefelder Alm, Bielefeld, Germany	China	1–0	1–1	Friendly
43	9 March 2009	Estádio Algarve, Faro, Portugal	Sweden	1–3	2–3	2009 Algarve Cup
44	25 July 2009	Rhein-Neckar-Arena, Sinsheim, Germany	Netherlands	2–0	6–0	Friendly
45	27 August 2009	Ratina Stadium, Tampere, Finland	France	1–0	5–1	UEFA Women's Euro 2009
46	30 August 2009	Ratina Stadium, Tampere, Finland	Iceland	1–0	1–0	UEFA Women's Euro 2009
47	4 September 2009	Lahti Stadium, Lahti, Finland	Italy	1–0	2–1	UEFA Women's Euro 2009
48	4 September 2009	Lahti Stadium, Lahti, Finland	Italy	2–0	2–1	UEFA Women's Euro 2009
49	10 September 2009	Olympic Stadium, Helsinki, Finland	England	4–2	6–2	UEFA Women's Euro 2009
50	10 September 2009	Olympic Stadium, Helsinki, Finland	England	5–2	6–2	UEFA Women's Euro 2009
51	24 February 2010	Complexo Desportivo Belavista, Parchal, Portugal	Denmark	2–0	4–0	2010 Algarve Cup
52	24 February 2010	Complexo Desportivo Belavista, Parchal, Portugal	Denmark	4–0	4–0	2010 Algarve Cup
53	28 February 2010	Complexo Desportivo Belavista, Parchal, Portugal	Finland	1–0	7–0	2010 Algarve Cup
54	28 February 2010	Complexo Desportivo Belavista, Parchal, Portugal	Finland	3–0	7–0	2010 Algarve Cup
55	28 February 2010	Complexo Desportivo Belavista, Parchal, Portugal	Finland	5–0	7–0	2010 Algarve Cup
56	3 March 2010	Estádio Algarve, Faro, Portugal	United States	1–2	2–3	2010 Algarve Cup
57	3 March 2010	Estádio Algarve, Faro, Portugal	United States	2–3	2–3	2010 Algarve Cup
58	15 September 2010	Rudolf-Harbig-Stadion, Dresden, Germany	Canada	1–0	5–0	Friendly
59	28 October 2010	Volkswagen Arena, Wolfsburg, Germany	Australia	1–1	2–1	Friendly
60	25 November 2010	BayArena, Leverkusen, Germany	Nigeria	1–0	8–0	Friendly
61	25 November 2010	BayArena, Leverkusen, Germany	Nigeria	3–0	8–0	Friendly
62	7 June 2011	New Tivoli, Aachen, Germany	Netherlands	5–0	5–0	Friendly
63	5 July 2011	Borussia-Park, Mönchengladbach, Germany	France	2–0	4–2	2011 FIFA Women's World Cup
64	5 July 2011	Borussia-Park, Mönchengladbach, Germany	France	3–1	4–2	2011 FIFA Women's World Cup

=== Goals by competition ===
Competition	Goals	Matches
Friendlies/Algarve Cup	30	50
FIFA World Cup	5	8
UEFA Women's Euro	10	11
World Cup qualifiers	3	9
Euro qualifiers	15	13
Olympics	1	5
Total	64	96

=== Matches and goals scored at World Cup and Olympic tournaments ===
Inka Grings competed in two FIFA Women's World Cup: USA 1999, and Germany 2011; one Olympics: Sydney 2000; played in 13 matches and scored 6 goals. Along with her Germany team, Grings is a bronze medalist from Sydney 2000.

Key (expand for notes on "world cup and olympic goals")
Location	Geographic location of the venue where the competition occurred
Lineup	Start – played entire match on minute (off player) – substituted on at the minute indicated, and player was substituted off at the same time off minute (on player) – substituted off at the minute indicated, and player was substituted on at the same time (c) – captain
Min	The minute in the match the goal was scored. For list that include caps, blank indicates played in the match but did not score a goal.
Assist/pass	The ball was passed by the player, which assisted in scoring the goal. This column depends on the availability and source of this information.
penalty or pk	Goal scored on penalty-kick which was awarded due to foul by opponent. (Goals scored in penalty-shoot-out, at the end of a tied match after extra-time, are not included.)
Score	The match score after the goal was scored.
Result	The final score. W – match was won L – match was lost to opponent D – match was drawn (W) – penalty-shoot-out was won after a drawn match (L) – penalty-shoot-out was lost after a drawn match
aet	The score at the end of extra-time; the match was tied at the end of 90' regulation
pso	Penalty-shoot-out score shown in parentheses; the match was tied at the end of extra-time
	Pink background color – Olympic women's football tournament
	Blue background color – FIFA women's world cup final tournament

Goal	Match	Date	Location	Opponent	Lineup	Min	Score	Result	Competition
(United States) USA 1999 FIFA Women's World Cup
	1	1999-06-20	Los Angeles	Italy	Start			1–1 D	Group match
1	2	1999-06-24	Portland	Mexico	Start	10	1–0	6–0 W	Group match
2	2	1999-06-24	Portland	Mexico	Start	57	4–0	6–0 W	Group match
3	2	1999-06-24	Portland	Mexico	Start	90+2	6–0	6–0 W	Group match
	3	1999-06-27	Washington	Brazil	off 89' (on Meyer)			3–3 D	Group match
	4	1999-07-01	Washington	United States	off 92' (on Hoffmann)			2–3 L	Quarter-final
(Australia) Sydney 2000 Olympic Women's Football Tournament
4	5	2000-09-13	Canberra	Australia	Start	35	1–0	3–0 W	Group match
	6	2000-09-16	Canberra	Brazil	Start			2–1 W	Group match
	7	2000-09-19	Melbourne	Sweden	off 45' (on Mueller)			1–0 W	Group match
	8	2000-09-24	Sydney	Norway	Start			0–1 L	Semifinal
	9	2000-09-28	Sydney	Brazil	off +94' (on Goette)			2–0 W	Bronze medal match
(United States) Germany 2011 FIFA Women's World Cup
	10	2011-06-26	Berlin	Canada	on 65' (off Mbabi)			2–1 W	Group match
	11	2011-06-30	Frankfurt	Nigeria	on 53' (off Prinz)			1–0 W	Group match
5	12	2011-07-05	Moenchengladbach	France	Start	32	2–0	4–2 W	Group match
6	12	2011-07-05	Moenchengladbach	France	Start	68 pk	3–1	4–2 W	Group match
	13	2011-07-09	Wolfsburg	Japan	off 102' (on Popp)			0–1 aet L	Quarter-final

== Honours ==
FCR 2001 Duisburg

- Bundesliga: 1999–00; runner-up (7) 1996–97, 1998–99, 2004–05, 2005–06, 2006–07, 2007–08, 2009–10
- German Cup: 1997–98, 2008–09, 2009–10; runner-up 1998–99, 2002–03, 2006–07
- UEFA Women's Cup: 2008–09

FC Zürich Frauen

- Nationalliga A: 2012, 2013
- Swiss Women's Cup: 2012, 2013

Germany

- UEFA European Championship: 2005, 2009
- Summer Olympic Games: Bronze medal 2000

Individual

- Women's Footballer of the Year (Germany): 1999, 2009, 2010
- Top-scorer Bundesliga (6): 1998–99, 1999–00, 2002–03, 2007–08, 2008–09, 2009–10
- Top-scorer UEFA Women's Championship: 2005, 2009
- Top-scorer UEFA Women's Champions League: 2010–11

== See also ==
- List of women footballers with 300 or more goals
- List of 2000 Summer Olympics medal winners
- List of UEFA Women's Championship goalscorers
- List of German women's football champions
- List of LGBT sportspeople
