= Melanie Hoffmann =

German footballer

Personal information
- Full name: Melanie Hoffmann
- Date of birth: 29 November 1974 (age 51)
- Place of birth: Haan, West Germany
- Height: 1.70 m (5 ft 7 in)
- Position: Midfielder

Youth career
- Garather SV
- TuS Xanten
- Fortuna Düsseldorf

Senior career*
Years	Team	Apps	(Gls)
–1994	KBC Duisburg		
1994–2003	FCR 2001 Duisburg	83	(43)
2003	Philadelphia Charge	20	(5)
2003–2004	FCR 2001 Duisburg	0	(0)
2005–2013	SG Essen-Schönebeck	167	(53)

International career^{‡}
1995–2000	Germany	36	(2)
Medal record
Women's football
Representing Germany
Olympic Games
Bronze medal – third place	2000 Sydney	Team competition
- * Club domestic league appearances and goals as of 14:57, 12 May 2013 (UTC) ‡ National team caps and goals as of 14:57, 7 July 2010 (UTC)

Melanie Hoffmann (born 29 November 1974) is a German former footballer who played as a midfielder.

== International career ==
Hoffmann competed for the Germany national team at the 2000 Summer Olympics.

== Honours ==
FCR 2001 Duisburg

- Bundesliga: 1999–00; runner-up 1996–97, 1998–99, 2004–05
- German Cup: 1997–98; runner-up 1998–99, 2002–03

Germany

- FIFA Women's World Cup: runner-up 1995
- UEFA Women's Championship: 1997
- Summer Olympic Games: Bronze medal 2000
