= Annike Krahn =

German footballer (born 1985)

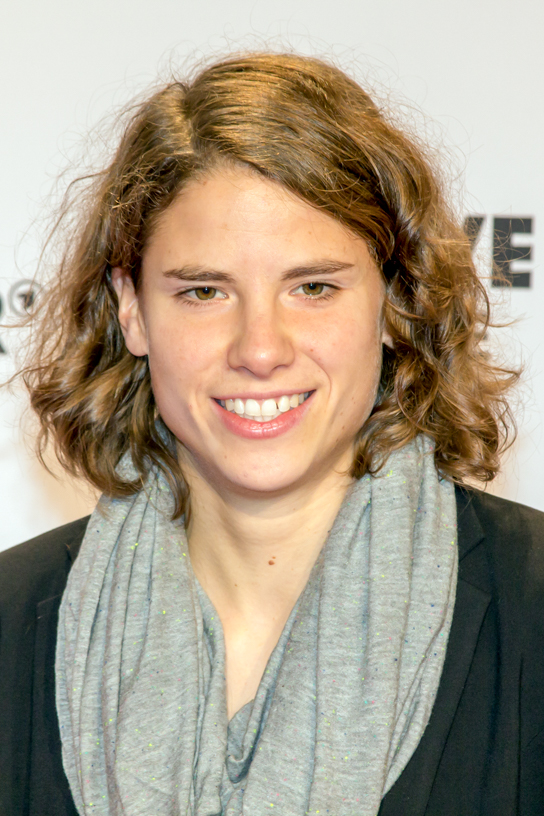
- Krahn in 2015

Personal information
- Full name: Annike Berit Krahn
- Date of birth: 1 July 1985 (age 41)
- Place of birth: Bochum, West Germany
- Height: 1.73 m (5 ft 8 in)
- Position: Centre back

Youth career
- 1989–1993: SV Westfalia Weitmar 09
- 1993–1998: SV Waldesrand Linden
- 1998–2002: TuS Harpen
- 2002–2004: SG Wattenscheid 09

Senior career*
Years	Team	Apps	(Gls)
2004–2012	FCR 2001 Duisburg	146	(8)
2012–2015	Paris Saint-Germain	52	(2)
2015–2017	Bayer Leverkusen	37	(0)
Total		235	(10)

International career
2002–2004	Germany U19	29	(10)
2005–2006	Germany U21	8	(0)
2005–2016	Germany	137	(5)
Medal record
Women's football
Representing Germany
FIFA Women's World Cup
Gold medal – first place	2007 China	Team
Olympic Games
Bronze medal – third place	2008 Beijing	Team
Gold medal – first place	2016 Rio de Janeiro	Team
UEFA Women's Championship
Gold medal – first place	2009 Finland	Team
Gold medal – first place	2013 Sweden	Team
- * Club domestic league appearances and goals

Annike Berit Krahn (born 1 July 1985) is a German former footballer who played as a centre back.

== Club career ==
Krahn started playing football at the age of four. She played at SV Westfalia Weitmar 09, SV Waldesrand Linden, TuS Harpen and SG Wattenscheid 09 at youth level, before joining FCR 2001 Duisburg in 2004. Krahn was runner-up in the Bundesliga five times with Duisburg, including four seasons in a row from 2005 to 2008. She won the German Cup twice with the club and claimed the UEFA Women's Cup with Duisburg in the 2008–09 season.

During qualification for the UEFA Women's Champions League against Glasgow City in August 2010, Krahn tore the anterior cruciate ligament in her left knee. She missed the entire 2010–11 Bundesliga season. Following the 2011–12 season she left Duisburg after eight years seeking a new challenge.

She signed a two-year contract with Paris Saint-Germain on 20 July 2012. She announced that she would leave Paris at the end of the 2014–15 season.

She joined Bayer Leverkusen at the start of the 2015–16 season.

On 10 May 2017, she announced her retirement at the end of the 2016–17 season.

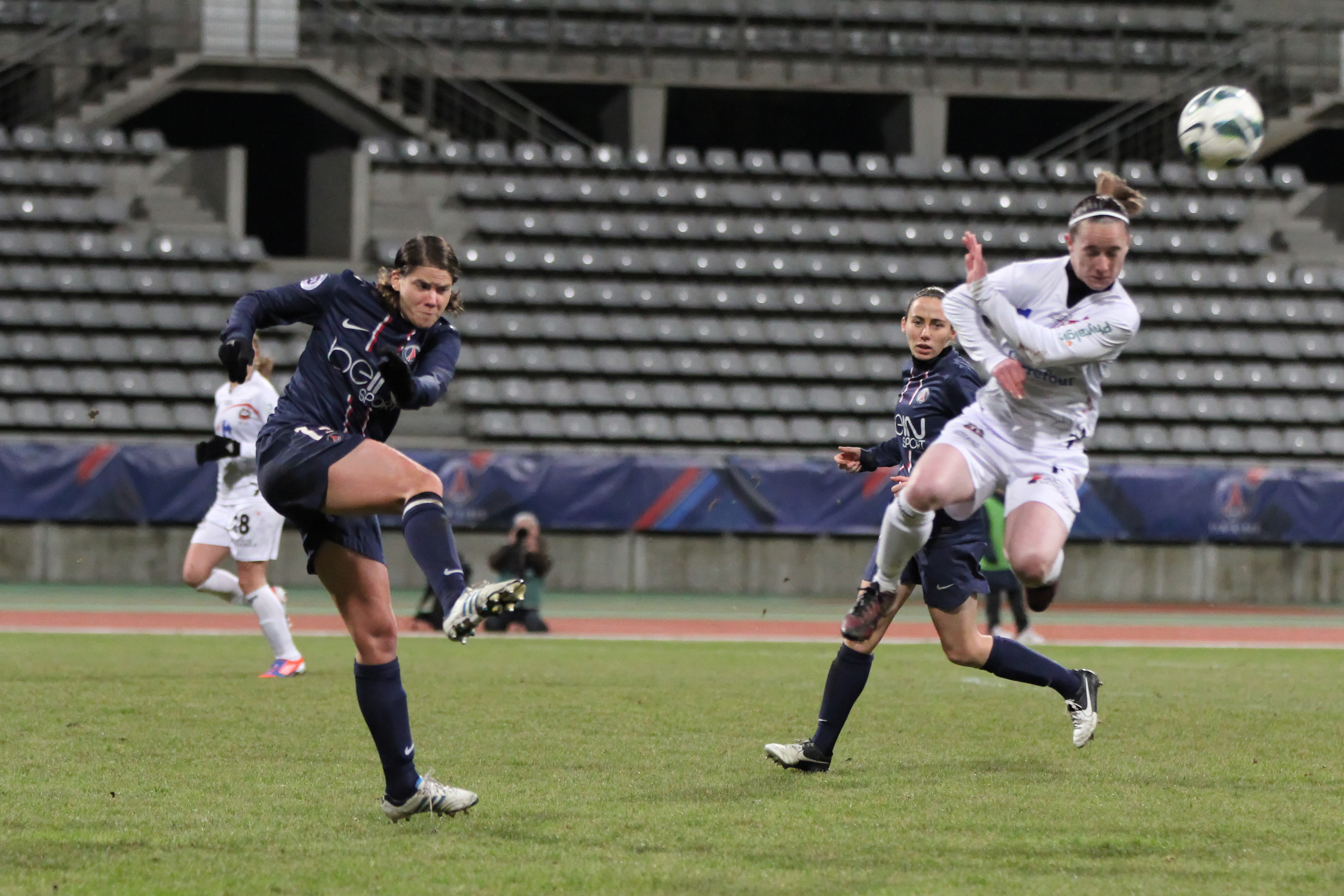
Krahn (on the left) playing for PSG in 2012.

== International career ==
In 2004, Krahn was runner-up with Germany at the 2004 UEFA Women's U-19 Championship and later that year won the 2004 FIFA U-19 Women's World Championship. She made her debut for the German senior national team in a friendly match against Australia in January 2005. The 2007 FIFA Women's World Cup was Krahn's first major tournament. Initially a reserve player, she started for Germany in the second group match against England after veteran Sandra Minnert got injured. Alongside Kerstin Stegemann, Ariane Hingst and Linda Bresonik, Krahn was part of Germany's defence which did not concede a single goal in the entire tournament.

One year later, she won the bronze medal at the 2008 Summer Olympics and she was part of Germany's team winning the country's seventh title at the 2009 European Championship. Krahn has been called up for Germany's 2011 FIFA Women's World Cup squad.

She was part of the squad for the 2016 Summer Olympics, where Germany won the gold medal.

She retired from international football on 23 August 2016.

== Career statistics ==
Scores and results list Germany's goal tally first:

Krahn – goals for Germany
#	Date	Location	Opponent	Score	Result	Competition
1.	22 September 2007	Wuhan, China	North Korea	3–0	3–0	2007 FIFA Women's World Cup
2.	1 November 2007	Volendam, Netherlands	Netherlands	1–0	1–0	UEFA Women's Euro 2009 qualifying
3.	29 May 2008	Kassel, Germany	Wales	3–0	4–0	UEFA Women's Euro 2009 qualifying
4.	27 August 2009	Tampere, Finland	France	2–0	5–1	UEFA Women's Euro 2009
5.	26 October 2013	Koper, Slovenia	Slovenia	4–0	13–0	2015 FIFA Women's World Cup qualification

== Honours ==
FCR 2001 Duisburg

- German Cup: 2008–09, 2009–10; runner-up 2006–07
- UEFA Women's Cup: 2008–09

Germany

- FIFA Women's World Cup: 2007
- UEFA Women's Championship: 2009, 2013
- Summer Olympic Games: Bronze medal 2008, Gold medal 2016

Germany U20

- FIFA U-19 Women's World Championship: 2004

Germany U19

- UEFA Women's U-19 Championship: runner-up 2004
- Algarve Cup: 2006, 2012, 2014

Individual

- Silbernes Lorbeerblatt: 2007, 2016
- UEFA Women's Championship All-Star Team: 2013
