= Bresonik =

Bresonik is a surname. Notable people with the surname include:

- Linda Bresonik (born 1983), German footballer

== See also ==
- Bresnik (disambiguation)
