= Ursula Holl =

German footballer

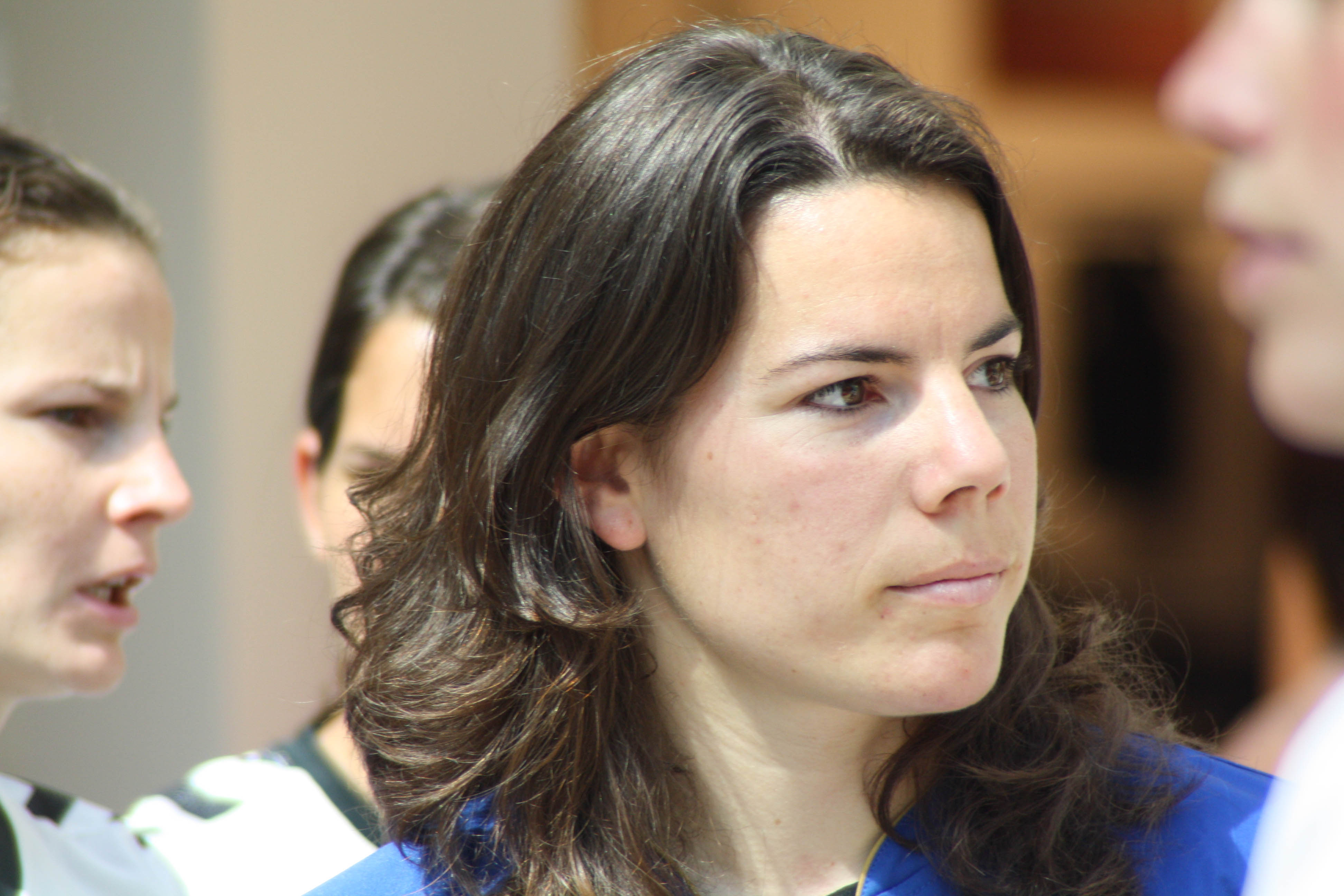
- Holl in 2010

Personal information
- Full name: Ursula Ulrike Holl
- Date of birth: 26 June 1982 (age 44)
- Place of birth: Würzburg, West Germany
- Height: 1.72 m (5 ft 7 1/2 in)
- Position: Goalkeeper

Youth career
- TSV Uengershausen

Senior career*
Years	Team	Apps	(Gls)
2000	FSV Frankfurt	10	(0)
2000–2003	1. FFC Frankfurt	17	(0)
2003–2005	FSV Frankfurt	35	(0)
2005–2007	1. FFC Frankfurt	27	(0)
2007–2009	SC 07 Bad Neuenahr	43	(0)
2009–2011	FCR 2001 Duisburg	31	(0)
2011–2012	Essen-Schönebeck	12	(0)

International career^{‡}
2001–2006	Germany U21	24	(0)
2007–2011	Germany	5	(0)

Managerial career
- 2012–: Bayer Leverkusen (goalkeeping coach)
Medal record
Women's football
Representing Germany
FIFA Women's World Cup
Gold medal – first place	2007 China	Team
Olympic Games
Bronze medal – third place	2008 Beijing	Team
UEFA Women's Championship
Gold medal – first place	2005 England	Team
Gold medal – first place	2009 Finland	Team
- * Club domestic league appearances and goals as of 00:36, 24 June 2011 (UTC) ‡ National team caps and goals as of 00:36, 24 June 2011 (UTC)

Ursula Ulrike Holl (born 26 June 1982) is a retired German footballer. She currently works as the goalkeeping coach for Bundesliga side Bayer Leverkusen.

== Career ==
=== Club ===
Holl started her career at TSV Uengershausen, before joining FSV Frankfurt, where she made her Bundesliga debut. She moved to local rivals 1. FFC Frankfurt in 2000, where she played for three seasons, but only appeared sporadically. However, she celebrated several major titles at the club, including the Treble in the 2002–03 season when Frankfurt won the Bundesliga, the German Cup and UEFA Women's Cup.

She returned to FSV Frankfurt in 2003 in order to play regular first team football. After two seasons, Holl transferred back to 1. FFC Frankfurt, now as the team's first choice goalkeeper. During her second stint at FFC Frankfurt, she won a second UEFA Women's Cup in the 2005–06 season, as well as another league title and the 2007 German Cup. From 2007 to 2009, Holl played for SC 07 Bad Neuenahr, before joining Bundesliga side FCR 2001 Duisburg. At Duisburg she was the Bundesliga runner-up in the 2009–10 season and won the 2010 German Cup, her fourth national cup title in total. After the 2010–11 season she left Duisburg and signed a one-year contract at Bundesliga side SG Essen-Schönebeck, after which she ended her active playing career.

=== International ===
At junior level, Holl won the UEFA Women's Under-19 Championship with the German team in 2000 and 2001. She was the first choice goalkeeper at both tournaments. Holl was Germany's third goalkeeper at the 2005 European Championship, winning her first international title without a single cap at senior level. She made her debut for the German national team almost two years later in March 2007 at the Algarve Cup against France. That year she also won the 2007 FIFA Women's World Cup with Germany, again as the team's third choice goalkeeper.

After the retirement of Silke Rottenberg, Holl has been Germany's first reserve goalkeeper to Nadine Angerer at the 2008 Summer Olympics, claiming bronze, and the 2009 European Championship, where Germany won its seventh title. Holl has been called up for the German 2011 FIFA Women's World Cup squad. She has not played in any match at these tournaments. Following the 2011 World Cup she retired from international play.

=== Coaching ===
On 2 December 2012 Holl signed on as Bayer 04 Leverkusen's goalkeeping coach.

== Personal life ==
On 18 June 2010, Holl married her partner Carina in Cologne, Germany. They live together in a same-sex union as recognised under German law.

== Media career ==
As of the 2013–14 season, Holl works as a pundit for Eurosport's coverage of the German Women's Bundesliga. She works in the same capacity for WDR on their coverage of the DFB-Pokal.

== Honours ==
=== Club ===
1. FFC Frankfurt

- UEFA Women's Cup: Winner (2) 2002–03, 2005–06
- Bundesliga: Winner (4) 2000–01, 2001–02, 2002–03, 2006–07
- German Cup: Winner (4) 2000–01, 2001–02, 2002–03, 2006–07, Runner-up (1) 2005–06

FCR 2001 Duisburg

- Bundesliga: Runner-up (1) 2009–10
- German Cup: Winner (1) 2009–10

=== International ===
- FIFA World Cup: Winner (1) 2007
- UEFA European Championship: Winner (2) 2005, 2009
- Summer Olympic Games: Bronze medal (1) 2008
- UEFA Women's Under-19 Championship: Winner (2) 2000, 2001

=== Individual ===
- Silbernes Lorbeerblatt: 2007
