= Simone Laudehr =

German footballer (born 1986)

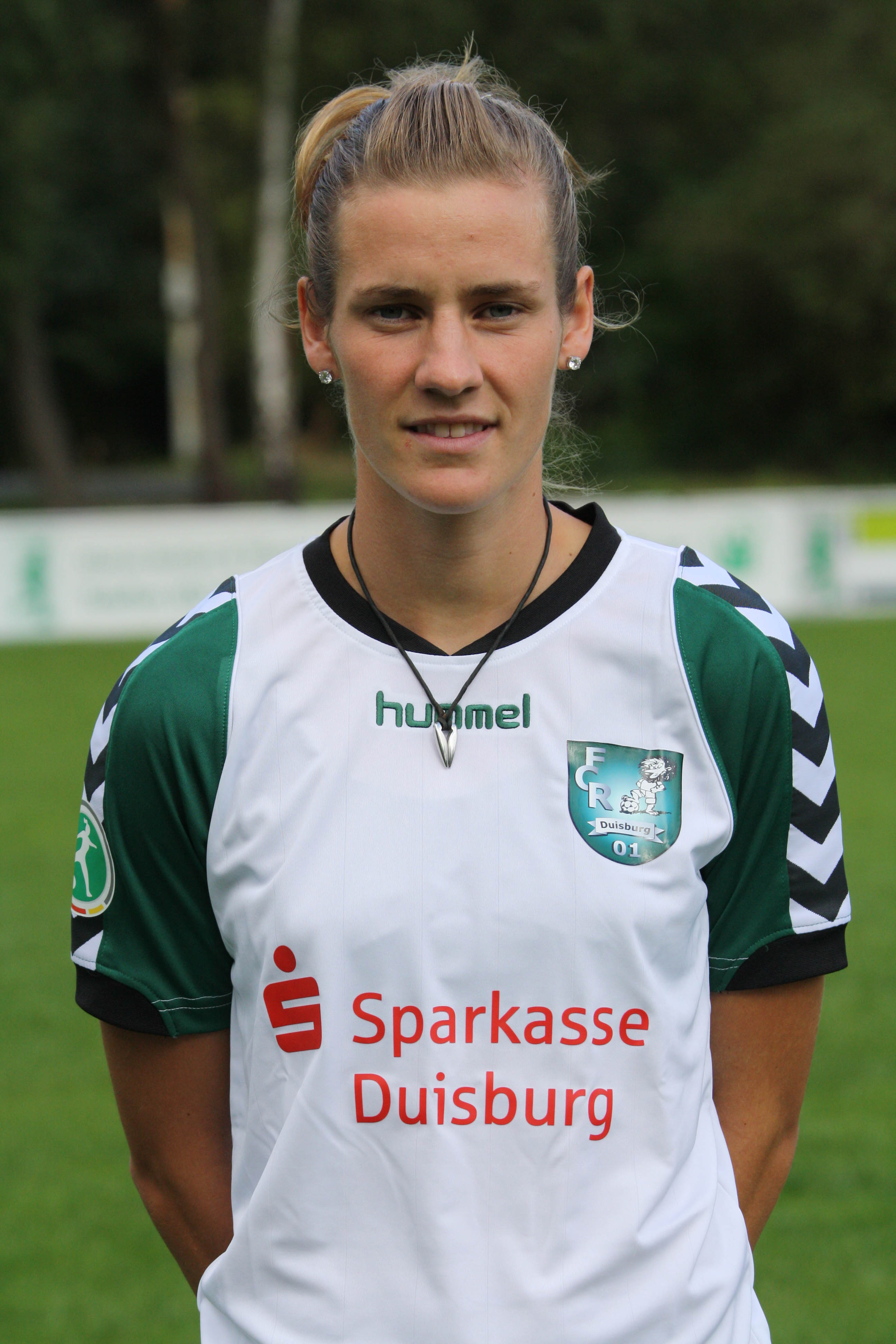
- Laudehr in 2011

Personal information
- Full name: Simone Melanie Laudehr
- Date of birth: 12 July 1986 (age 40)
- Place of birth: Regensburg, West Germany
- Height: 1.75 m (5 ft 9 in)
- Positions: Central midfielder; winger

Youth career
- 1989–1996: FC Tegernheim
- 1996–2003: SC Regensburg

Senior career*
Years	Team	Apps	(Gls)
2003–2004	Bayern Munich	18	(4)
2004–2012	FCR 2001 Duisburg	155	(69)
2012–2016	1. FFC Frankfurt	67	(9)
2016–2021	Bayern Munich	62	(10)

International career^{‡}
2001–2003	Germany U-17	21	(3)
2003–2005	Germany U-19	35	(16)
2006	Germany U-20	4	(2)
2006	Germany U-21	5	(2)
2007–2017	Germany	103	(26)
Medal record
Women's football
Representing Germany
FIFA Women's World Cup
Gold medal – first place	2007 China	Team
Olympic Games
Bronze medal – third place	2008 Beijing	Team
Gold medal – first place	2016 Rio de Janeiro	Team
UEFA Women's Championship
Gold medal – first place	2009 Finland	Team
Gold medal – first place	2013 Sweden	Team
- * Club domestic league appearances and goals as of 28 December 2017 ‡ National team caps and goals as of 24 October 2017

Simone Melanie Laudehr (born 12 July 1986) is a German former footballer who played as a central midfielder or winger.

== Career ==
=== Club ===
Laudehr began her career at the age of three at FC Tegernheim. In 1996, she joined SC Regensburg, before playing for FC Bayern Munich for one season. At Bayern she made her Bundesliga debut. Laudehr transferred to FCR 2001 Duisburg in 2004, where she was runner-up in the Bundesliga five times, including four seasons in a row from 2005 to 2008. She won the German Cup twice with Duisburg and claimed the UEFA Women's Cup with the club in the 2008–09 season. For the 2012–2013 season she moved to 1. FFC Frankfurt. She extended her contract until the 2016–17 season on 21 April 2015.

In 2016, Laudehr joined Bayern Munich. Prior to the end of the 2020–21 season, Laudehr announced her retirement from football. She won the first and only league title of her career on the final matchday of the 2020–21 Frauen-Bundesliga, making her 210th Bundesliga appearance by substituting into the match with 10 minutes to spare.

=== International ===
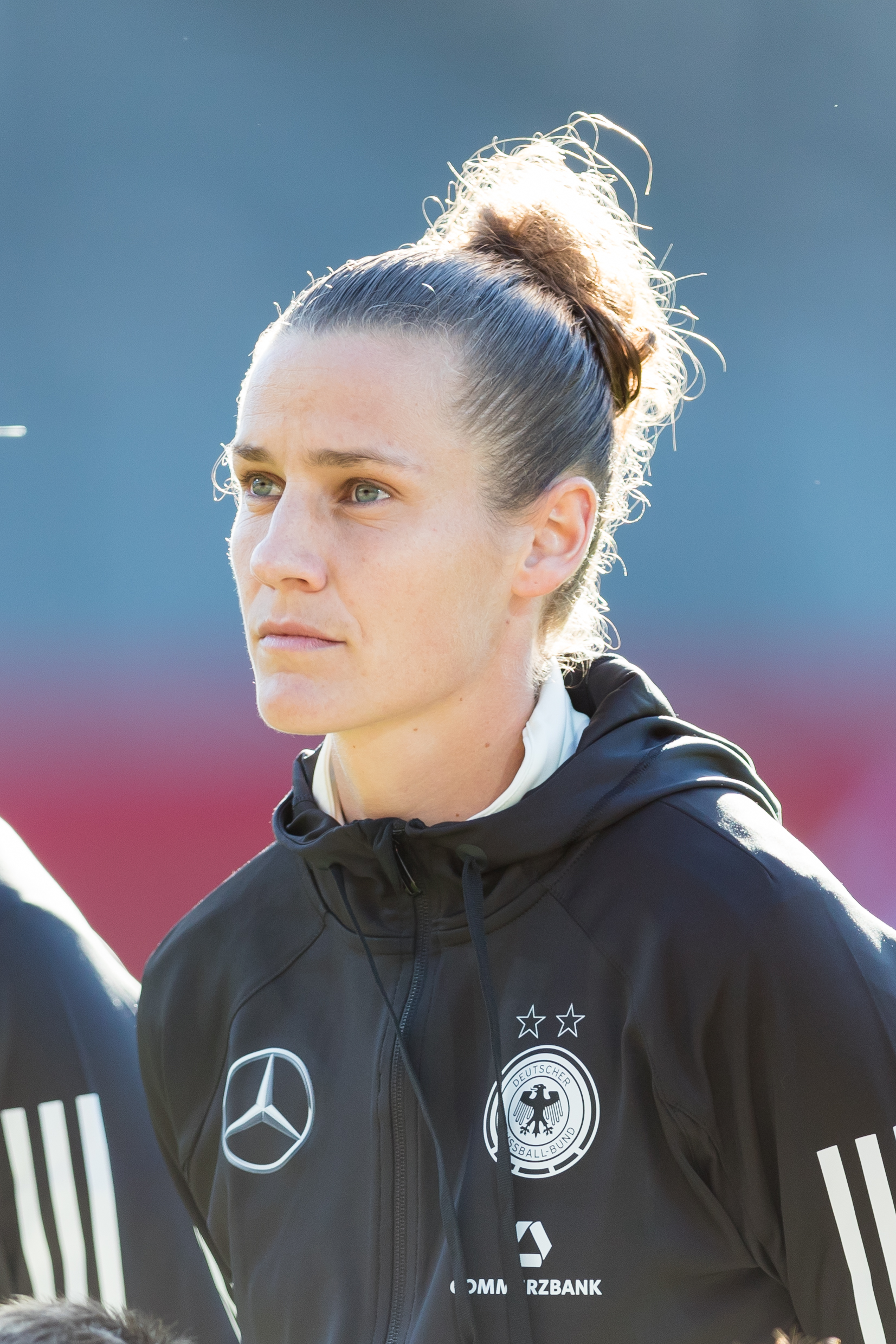
Laudehr with Germany in 2017.

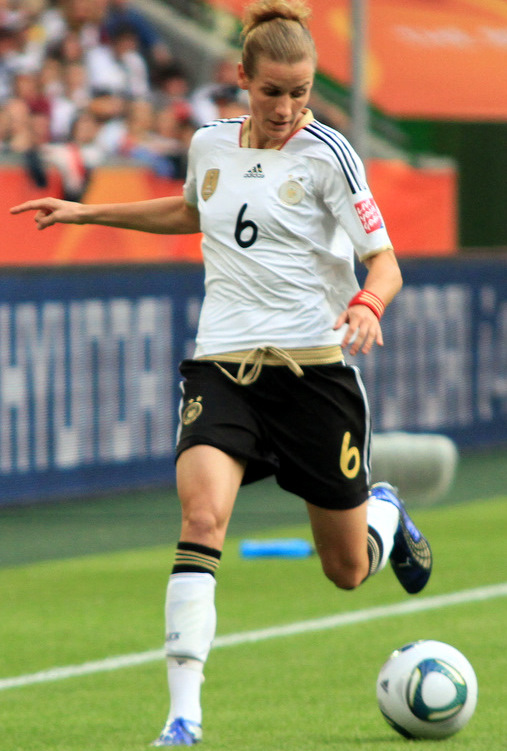
Laudehr playing for Germany in 2011.

In 2004, Laudehr was runner-up with Germany at the 2004 UEFA Women's U-19 Championship and later that year won the 2004 FIFA U-19 Women's World Championship. She made her debut for the German senior national team in July 2007 against Denmark. Only two months later she was part of Germany's 2007 FIFA Women's World Cup squad. Laudehr was a starter for Germany in five matches, including in the World Cup final, in which she scored after 86 minutes to seal the German 2–0 victory. Her World Cup winning header was later voted Germany's Goal of the Month.

One year later, she won the bronze medal at the 2008 Summer Olympics and was part of Germany's team which won the country's seventh title at the 2009 European Championship. Laudehr has been called up for Germany's 2011 FIFA Women's World Cup squad.

She was part of the squad for the 2016 Summer Olympics, where Germany won the gold medal.

In 2019, she retired from the Germany national team after being left out of their squad for the 2019 FIFA Women's World Cup.

==== International goals ====
Scores and results list Germany's goal tally first:

Laudehr – goals for Germany
#	Date	Location	Opponent	Score	Result	Competition
1.	2 August 2007	Gera, Germany	Czech Republic	2–0	5–0	Friendly
2.	30 September 2007	Shanghai, China	Brazil	2–0	2–0	2007 FIFA Women's World Cup
3.	15 August 2008	Shenyang, China	Sweden	2–0	2–0	2008 Summer Olympics
4.	25 July 2009	Sinsheim, Germany	Netherlands	5–0	6–0	Friendly
5.	27 August 2009	Tampere, Finland	France	5–1	5–1	UEFA Women's Euro 2009
6.	7 September 2009	Helsinki, Finland	Norway	1–1	3–1	UEFA Women's Euro 2009
7.	17 February 2010	Duisburg, Germany	North Korea	2–0	3–0	Friendly
8.	7 June 2011	Aachen, Germany	Netherlands	2–0	5–0	Friendly
9.	16 June 2011	Mainz, Germany	Norway	1–0	3–0	Friendly
10.	30 June 2011	Frankfurt, Germany	Nigeria	1–0	1–0	2011 FIFA Women's World Cup
11.	19 November 2011	Wiesbaden, Germany	Kazakhstan	7–0	17–0	UEFA Women's Euro 2013 qualifying
12.	19 November 2011	Wiesbaden, Germany	Kazakhstan	10–0	17–0	UEFA Women's Euro 2013 qualifying
13.	19 September 2012	Dusiburg, Germany	Turkey	3–0	10–0	UEFA Women's Euro 2013 qualifying
14.	29 June 2013	Munich, Germany	Japan	4–2	4–2	Friendly
15.	21 July 2013	Växjö, Sweden	Italy	1–0	1–0	UEFA Women's Euro 2013
16.	26 October 2013	Koper, Slovenia	Slovenia	7–0	13–0	2015 FIFA Women's World Cup qualification
17.	10 March 2014	Albufeira, Portugal	Norway	2–1	3–1	2014 Algarve Cup
18.	5 April 2014	Dublin, Ireland	Republic of Ireland	1–1	3–2	2015 FIFA Women's World Cup qualification
19.	8 May 2014	Osnabrück, Germany	Slovakia	8–0	9–1	2015 FIFA Women's World Cup qualification
20.	19 June 2014	Vancouver, Canada	Canada	2–1	2–1	Friendly
21.	13 September 2014	Moscow, Russia	Russia	1–0	4–1	2015 FIFA Women's World Cup qualification
22.	4 March 2015	Vila Real de Santo António, Portugal	Sweden	2–0	2–4	2015 Algarve Cup
23.	8 April 2015	Fürth, Germany	Brazil	2–0	4–0	Friendly
24.	27 May 2015	Baden, Switzerland	Switzerland	1–1	3–1	Friendly
25.	7 June 2015	Ottawa, Canada	Ivory Coast	7–0	10–0	2015 FIFA Women's World Cup
26.	18 September 2015	Halle, Germany	Hungary	8–0	12–0	UEFA Women's Euro 2017 qualifying

== Personal life ==
Laudehr was born in Regensburg, Bavaria, Germany. She is the daughter of a Romanian mother, Doina, and a German father, Hubert.

== Honours ==
=== Club ===
FCR 2001 Duisburg

- DFB-Pokal: 2008–09, 2009–10; Runner-up 2006–07
- UEFA Women's Champions League: 2008–09

1. FFC Frankfurt

- UEFA Women's Champions League: 2014–15
- DFB-Pokal: 2013–14

FC Bayern Munchen

- Frauen-Bundesliga: 2020–21

=== International ===
- FIFA World Cup: 2007
- UEFA European Championship: 2009, 2013
- Summer Olympic Games: Bronze medal 2008, Gold medal 2016
- FIFA U-19 Women's World Championship: 2004
- UEFA Women's U-19 Championship: Runner-up 2004
- Algarve Cup: 2014

=== Individual ===
- Silbernes Lorbeerblatt: 2007
- Goal of the Month: September 2007
- 2004 FIFA U-19 Women's World Championship All star team
