= Sonja Fuss =

German footballer (born 1978)

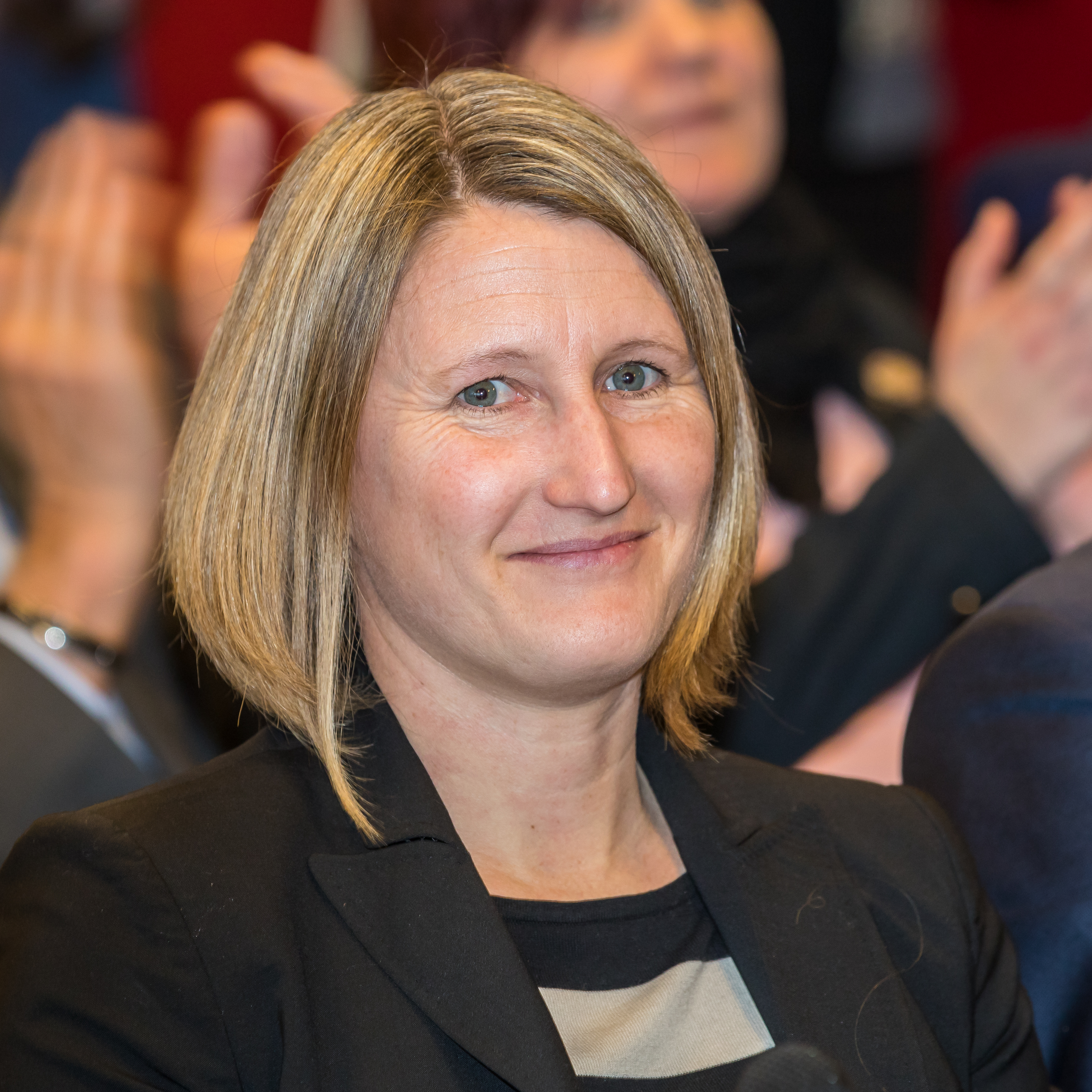
- Fuss in 2019

Personal information
- Full name: Sonja Beate Fuss
- Date of birth: 5 November 1978 (age 47)
- Place of birth: Bonn, West Germany
- Height: 1.67 m (5 ft 5 1/2 in)
- Position: Defender

Youth career
- Grün-Weiß Brauweiler

College career
Years	Team	Apps	(Gls)
1998–1999	Hartford Hawks		

Senior career*
Years	Team	Apps	(Gls)
–2004	FFC Brauweiler Pulheim	89	
2004–2005	FSV Frankfurt	11	(2)
2005	1. FFC Turbine Potsdam	12	(0)
2005–2006	FFC Brauweiler Pulheim	20	(6)
2006–2009	FCR 2001 Duisburg	68	(4)
2009–2010	1. FC Köln	33	(9)
2011	FCR 2001 Duisburg	7	(0)
2011–2013	FC Zürich Frauen		
2013	Chicago Red Stars	16	(2)

International career
	Germany U-19	19	
1996–2010	Germany	68	(3)
Medal record
Women's football
Representing Germany
FIFA Women's World Cup
Gold medal – first place	2003 United States	Team
Gold medal – first place	2007 China	Team
Olympic Games
Bronze medal – third place	2004 Athens	Team
UEFA Women's Championship
Gold medal – first place	1997 Norway/Sweden	Team
Gold medal – first place	2005 England	Team
Gold medal – first place	2009 Finland	Team
- * Club domestic league appearances and goals

Sonja Beate Fuss (born 5 November 1978) is a German former football defender. She played for the Chicago Red Stars in the National Women's Soccer League (NWSL) and the Germany national team. She has played in the German Frauen-Bundesliga since 1992. In 2011, together with Inka Grings, she played for Swiss side, FC Zürich Frauen.

== Early life ==
=== Hartford University ===
Fuss attended the University of Hartford located in West Hartford, Connecticut.

== Playing career ==
=== Club ===
Fuss spent most of her career playing for SV Grün-Weiß, which was renamed FFC Brauweiler Pulheim in 2000. In 2004, she transferred to FSV Frankfurt.

In February 2005, she signed with FFC Turbine Potsdam. She returned to FFC Brauweiler Pulheim after one season.

At the beginning of the season 2006/07, she moved to FCR 2001 Duisburg.

In July 2009, Fuss moved to 1. FC Köln, the newly formed women's soccer Division 1, for the 2009/10 season. In January 2011, she returned to play for FCR 2001 Duisburg. Her contract there was disbanded in August 2011 and she then signed on 28 August at FC Zürich Frauen.

On 16 March 2013, along with Inka Grings, Fuss left Zürich for National Women's Soccer League (NWSL) club, the Chicago Red Stars, in May 2013.

She was waived by the Red Stars in September 2013.

=== International ===
Fuss played in her first international match in 1996 against the Netherlands. She scored her first international goal on 15 November 2003 against Portugal. Fuss was a European champion in 1997, 2005 and 2009 and world champion in 2003 and 2007. In 2004, she was a member of the bronze medal-winning German squad at the Olympic Games in Athens.

=== Honors and awards ===
National

- World Champion in 2003 and 2007
- European champion in 1997, 2005 and 2009
- Olympic bronze medal in 2004

Club football

- German Champion 1997
- Swiss Champion 2011/12, 2012/13
- Swiss Cupsiegerin 2012, 2013
- DFB Cup winner in 1997, 2005 and 2009
- UEFA Women's Cup winner in 2005 and 2009
