= Football at the 2008 Summer Olympics =

Football at the Games of the XXIX Olympiad
- Football pictogram for the 2008 Summer Olympics

Event details
- Games: 2008 Summer Olympics
- Host country: China
- Dates: 6–23 August 2008
- Venues: 6 (in 5 host cities)
- Competitors: 469 from 21 nations

Men's tournament
- Teams: 16 (from 6 confederations)
Medalists
Gold	Argentina
Silver	Nigeria
Bronze	Brazil

Women's tournament
- Teams: 12 (from 6 confederations)
Medalists
Gold	United States
Silver	Brazil
Bronze	Germany

Editions
- ← 2004 2012 →

Football at the 2008 Summer Olympics was held in Beijing and several other cities in the People's Republic of China from 6 to 23 August. Associations affiliated with FIFA were invited to send their full women's national teams and men's U-23 teams to participate. Men's teams were allowed to augment their squad with three players over the age of 23.

For these games, the men competed in a 16-team tournament, and the women in a 12-team tournament. Preliminary matches commenced two days before the Opening Ceremony of the Games on 8 August.

== Venues ==
Beijing		Shanghai	Location of the host cities of the football at the 2008 Summer Olympics.
Beijing National Stadium	Beijing Workers' Stadium	Shanghai Stadium	Location of the host cities of the football at the 2008 Summer Olympics.
Capacity: 91,000	Capacity: 70,161	Capacity: 80,000	Location of the host cities of the football at the 2008 Summer Olympics.
Tianjin	Shenyang	Qinhuangdao	Location of the host cities of the football at the 2008 Summer Olympics.
Tianjin Olympic Centre Stadium	Shenyang Olympic Stadium	Qinhuangdao Olympic Sports Centre Stadium	Location of the host cities of the football at the 2008 Summer Olympics.
Capacity: 60,000	Capacity: 60,000	Capacity: 33,000	Location of the host cities of the football at the 2008 Summer Olympics.

Beijing National Stadium only used during the Men's tournament final.

== Men ==
Event	Gold	Silver	Bronze
Men	Argentina; Oscar Ustari; Ezequiel Garay; Luciano Fabián Monzón; Pablo Zabaleta; Fernando Gago; Federico Fazio; José Ernesto Sosa; Éver Banega; Ezequiel Lavezzi; Juan Román Riquelme (captain); Ángel Di María; Nicolás Pareja; Lautaro Acosta; Javier Mascherano; Lionel Messi; Sergio Agüero; Diego Buonanotte; Sergio Romero; Nicolás Navarro	Nigeria; Ambruse Vanzekin; Chibuzor Okonkwo; Onyekachi Apam; Dele Adeleye; Monday James; Chinedu Obasi; Sani Kaita; Victor Obinna; Isaac Promise (captain); Solomon Okoronkwo; Oluwafemi Ajilore; Olubayo Adefemi; Peter Odemwingie; Efe Ambrose; Victor Anichebe; Emmanuel Ekpo; Ikechukwu Ezenwa; Oladapo Olufemi	Brazil; Diego Alves; Renan; Rafinha; Alex Silva; Thiago Silva; Marcelo; Ilsinho; Breno; Hernanes; Anderson; Lucas; Ronaldinho (captain); Ramires; Diego; Thiago Neves; Alexandre Pato; Rafael Sóbis; Jô

== Women ==
Event	Gold	Silver	Bronze
Women	United States; Hope Solo; Heather Mitts; Christie Rampone (captain); Rachel Buehler; Lindsay Tarpley; Natasha Kai; Shannon Boxx; Amy Rodriguez; Heather O'Reilly; Aly Wagner; Carli Lloyd; Lauren Cheney; Tobin Heath; Stephanie Cox; Kate Markgraf; Angela Hucles; Lori Chalupny; Nicole Barnhart	Brazil; Andréia; Simone; Andréia Rosa; Tânia (captain); Renata Costa; Maycon; Daniela; Formiga; Ester; Marta; Cristiane; Bárbara; Francielle; Pretinha; Fabiana; Érika; Maurine; Rosana	Germany; Nadine Angerer; Kerstin Stegemann; Saskia Bartusiak; Babett Peter; Annike Krahn; Linda Bresonik; Melanie Behringer; Sandra Smisek; Birgit Prinz (captain); Renate Lingor; Anja Mittag; Ursula Holl; Célia Okoyino da Mbabi; Simone Laudehr; Fatmire Bajramaj; Conny Pohlers; Ariane Hingst; Kerstin Garefrekes

== See also ==
- Football 5-a-side at the 2008 Summer Paralympics
- Football 7-a-side at the 2008 Summer Paralympics
