= 2004–05 Frauen-Bundesliga =

Frauen-Bundesliga
- Season: 2004–05
- Champions: Frankfurt; 5th Bundesliga title 5th German title
- Relegated: Crailsheim; Wolfsburg
- UEFA Cup: Frankfurt; Turbine Potsdam
- Matches: 132
- Goals: 523 (3.96 per match)
- Top goalscorer: (Germany) Shelley Thompson (30)
- Biggest home win: 8–0 Duisburg v Heike Rheine
- Biggest away win: 0–8 Bad Neuenahr v Duisburg
- Highest scoring: 4–6 Bad Neuenahr v Frankfurt
- Highest attendance: 3,732 Essen-Schönebeck v Frankfurt
- Lowest attendance: 100 Bayern v Potsdam, Hamburg v Crailsheim
- Average attendance: 503

The 2004–05 Frauen-Bundesliga was the 15th season of the Frauen-Bundesliga, Germany's premier football league. It began on 5 September 2004 and ended on 10 May 2005.

== Final standings ==
Pos	Team	Pld	W	D	L	GF	GA	GD	Pts	Qualification or relegation
1	1. FFC Frankfurt	22	21	0	1	78	16	+62	63	2004–05 Bundesliga (women) champions
2	FCR 2001 Duisburg	22	18	2	2	91	20	+71	56	
3	1. FFC Turbine Potsdam (Note: 2003–04 Bundesliga (women) champion)	22	16	1	5	79	29	+50	49	UEFA Women's Cup (as title holder)
4	FC Bayern Munich	22	10	3	9	39	37	+2	33	
5	SC 07 Bad Neuenahr	22	10	3	9	40	42	−2	33	
6	FSV Frankfurt	22	7	5	10	37	51	−14	26	
7	FFC Heike Rheine	22	7	4	11	36	54	−18	25	
8	SC Freiburg	22	7	2	13	30	56	−26	23	
9	Hamburger SV	22	6	2	14	20	48	−28	20	
10	SG Essen-Schönebeck(N) (Note: Promoted from the 2. Bundesliga (women) last season)	22	6	2	14	28	63	−35	20	
11	TSV Crailsheim(N)	22	6	0	16	19	49	−30	18	Will be relegated to the 2. Bundesliga (women)
12	VfL Wolfsburg	22	5	2	15	26	58	−32	17	Will be relegated to the 2. Bundesliga (women)

== Results ==
Home \ Away	FRA	DUI	POT	FCB	NEU	FSV	HRH	FRE	HSV	ESS	CRA	WOF
1. FFC Frankfurt		3–1	5–2	4–0	4–0	2–1	3–2	4–0	2–0	6–0	4–1	1–0
FCR 2001 Duisburg	2–1		3–2	3–3	8–0	7–0	5–2	0–0	5–0	3–0	3–0	6–0
1. FFC Turbine Potsdam	1–2	5–0		3–1	6–4	0–0	5–2	7–1	2–1	6–2	0–2	4–0
FC Bayern Munich	0–4	0–2	4–3		1–4	3–1	2–3	5–1	0–1	0–0	3–0	4–0
SC 07 Bad Neuenahr	1–2	1–5	0–3	0–0		4–1	0–2	2–0	0–1	3–0	3–0	2–1
FSV Frankfurt	2–4	1–6	1–2	1–0	2–2		3–3	2–2	2–1	0–3	3–1	0–2
FFC Heike Rheine	1–3	0–8	0–5	2–3	1–1	2–2		3–1	2–0	1–3	0–2	2–5
SC Freiburg	1–5	0–3	0–4	0–1	1–3	3–2	0–3		1–0	5–4	1–3	1–3
Hamburger SV	0–5	1–7	0–6	0–1	2–1	3–4	2–0	1–5		0–0	0–1	1–0
SG Essen-Schönebeck	0–6	1–4	0–4	0–6	2–5	0–3	0–2	0–2	2–1		0–2	5–2
TSV Crailsheim	1–5	0–5	1–5	1–2	0–1	0–1	0–2	1–2	0–3	0–3		1–0
VfL Wolfsburg	0–3	0–5	0–4	4–0	0–3	1–5	1–1	0–3	2–2	2–3	3–2	

Legend: Blue = home team win; Yellow = draw; Red = away team win.

== Top scorers ==
	Player	Team	Goals
1	(Germany) Shelley Thompson	FCR 2001 Duisburg	30
2	(Germany) Inka Grings	FCR 2001 Duisburg	25
3	(Germany) Birgit Prinz	1. FFC Frankfurt	18
