= 2002–03 Frauen-Bundesliga =

Frauen-Bundesliga
- Season: 2002–03
- Champions: Frankfurt; 4th Bundesliga title 4th German title
- Relegated: Tennis Borussia Berlin; Niederkirchen
- UEFA Cup: Frankfurt
- Matches: 132
- Goals: 515 (3.9 per match)
- Top goalscorer: (Germany) Inka Grings (20)
- Biggest home win: 11–0 FFC Frankfurt v Bad Neuenahr
- Biggest away win: 0–9 Bad Neuenahr v FSV Frankfurt
- Highest scoring: 11–0 FFC Frankfurt v Bad Neuenahr
- Longest unbeaten run: Potsdam (21), Day 2–22
- Longest losing run: Niederkirchen (10), Day 13–22
- Highest attendance: 7,900 Potsdam v FFC Frankfurt
- Lowest attendance: 63 Berlin v Brauweiler Pulheim
- Average attendance: 335

The 2002–03 Bundesliga (women) was the 13th season of the Bundesliga (women), Germany's premier football league. It began on 25 August 2002 and ended on 15 June 2003.

== Final standings ==
| Pos | Team | Pld | W | D | L | GF | GA | GD | Pts | Relegation |
|---|---|---|---|---|---|---|---|---|---|---|
| 1 | 1. FFC Frankfurt (Note: 2001–02 Bundesliga (women) champion) | 22 | 18 | 3 | 1 | 90 | 14 | +76 | 57 | 2002–03 Bundesliga (women) champions |
| 2 | 1. FFC Turbine Potsdam | 22 | 17 | 4 | 1 | 65 | 15 | +50 | 55 | |
| 3 | FCR 2001 Duisburg | 22 | 14 | 2 | 6 | 58 | 32 | +26 | 44 | |
| 4 | FFC Heike Rheine | 22 | 12 | 2 | 8 | 52 | 31 | +21 | 38 | |
| 5 | FC Bayern Munich | 22 | 11 | 4 | 7 | 45 | 32 | +13 | 37 | |
| 6 | FFC Brauweiler Pulheim | 22 | 10 | 4 | 8 | 41 | 27 | +14 | 34 | |
| 7 | FSV Frankfurt | 22 | 9 | 0 | 13 | 42 | 54 | −12 | 27 | |
| 8 | SC Freiburg | 22 | 6 | 6 | 10 | 33 | 43 | −10 | 24 | |
| 9 | WSV Wendschott | 22 | 6 | 6 | 10 | 31 | 49 | −18 | 24 | |
| 10 | SC 07 Bad Neuenahr | 22 | 7 | 2 | 13 | 31 | 73 | −42 | 23 | |
| 11 | Tennis Borussia Berlin (Note: Promoted from the 2. Bundesliga (women) last season) | 22 | 4 | 3 | 15 | 17 | 68 | −51 | 15 | Will be relegated to the 2. Bundesliga (women) |
| 12 | TuS Niederkirchen | 22 | 0 | 2 | 20 | 10 | 77 | −67 | 2 | Will be relegated to the 2. Bundesliga (women) |

== Results ==
| Home \ Away | FRA | POT | DUI | HRH | FCB | BRP | FSV | FRE | WSV | NEU | TBB | NIE |
|---|---|---|---|---|---|---|---|---|---|---|---|---|
| 1. FFC Frankfurt | | 2–3 | 3–0 | 3–1 | 4–1 | 2–1 | 2–2 | 6–0 | 5–0 | 11–0 | 6–0 | 7–1 |
| 1. FFC Turbine Potsdam | 0–0 | | 0–0 | 2–0 | 1–1 | 2–1 | 2–0 | 0–0 | 7–0 | 4–0 | 5–1 | 6–0 |
| FCR 2001 Duisburg | 0–4 | 1–5 | | 1–7 | 3–2 | 3–1 | 3–1 | 1–0 | 6–1 | 3–0 | 5–0 | 5–1 |
| FFC Heike Rheine | 0–3 | 0–2 | 0–0 | | 1–0 | 2–3 | 4–0 | 0–2 | 3–0 | 4–1 | 1–0 | 6–0 |
| FC Bayern Munich | 0–3 | 0–2 | 0–0 | 1–0 | | 2–1 | 2–2 | 3–2 | 1–1 | 2–3 | 6–1 | 7–1 |
| FFC Brauweiler Pulheim | 0–1 | 2–2 | 4–1 | 2–2 | 0–1 | | 0–0 | 1–2 | 2–1 | 7–0 | 2–0 | 4–0 |
| FSV Frankfurt | 1–4 | 1–3 | 0–1 | 3–4 | 1–2 | 1–3 | | 3–1 | 1–3 | 2–2 | 3–0 | 3–1 |
| SC Freiburg | 0–5 | 0–4 | 1–6 | 2–3 | 1–6 | 1–2 | 1–2 | | 4–1 | 3–1 | 3–0 | 3–1 |
| WSV Wendschott | 2–2 | 0–3 | 0–3 | 1–1 | 4–1 | 0–0 | 0–1 | 3–2 | | 1–3 | 4–1 | 5–1 |
| SC 07 Bad Neuenahr | 0–7 | 4–3 | 2–1 | 0–1 | 2–3 | 0–3 | 2–3 | 1–9 | 2–2 | | 2–1 | 3–0 |
| Tennis Borussia Berlin | 2–8 | 0–6 | 0–5 | 0–7 | 0–1 | 2–0 | 2–2 | 3–1 | 0–0 | 2–0 | | 1–0 |
| TuS Niederkirchen | 0–2 | 0–1 | 0–5 | 0–4 | 0–3 | 1–3 | 1–1 | 1–2 | 0–2 | 1–3 | 1–1 | |

Legend: Blue = home team win; Yellow = draw; Red = away team win.

== Top scorers ==
| | Player | Team | Goals |
|---|---|---|---|
| 1 | (Germany) Inka Grings | FCR 2001 Duisburg | 20 |
| 2 | (Austria) Nina Aigner | FC Bayern Munich | 17 |
| 3 | (Germany) Renate Lingor | 1. FFC Frankfurt | 15 |
