= 1999–2000 Frauen-Bundesliga =

Frauen-Bundesliga
- Season: 1999–2000
- Champions: Duisburg; 1st Bundesliga title 1st German title
- Relegated: TuS Niederkirchen; 1. FC Nürnberg
- Goals: 487
- Average goals/game: 3.69
- Top goalscorer: (Germany) Inka Grings (38)

The 1999–2000 Frauen-Bundesliga was the tenth season of the Frauen-Bundesliga, Germany's premier football league. It began on 29 August 1999 and ended on 21 May 2000.

== Final standings ==
Pos	Team	Pld	W	D	L	GF	GA	GD	Pts	Relegation
1	FCR Duisburg	22	20	0	2	85	10	+75	60	1999–2000 Frauen-Bundesliga champions
2	1. FFC Frankfurt (Note: 1998–99 Frauen-Bundesliga champion)	22	14	3	5	67	13	+54	45	
3	Sportfreunde Siegen	22	13	3	6	48	28	+20	42	
4	1. FFC Turbine Potsdam	22	13	2	7	43	27	+16	41	
5	Grün-Weiß Brauweiler	22	11	6	5	50	30	+20	39	
6	SC 07 Bad Neuenahr	22	12	2	8	41	28	+13	38	
7	WSV Wendschott	22	10	5	7	46	37	+9	35	
8	FFC Flaesheim-Hillen (Note: Promoted from the 2. Bundesliga (women) last season)	22	6	2	14	23	74	−51	20	
9	FSV Frankfurt	22	6	1	15	28	52	−24	19	
10	1. FC Saarbrücken	22	5	3	14	25	40	−15	18	
11	TuS Niederkirchen	22	4	2	16	16	63	−47	14	Will be relegated to the 2. Bundesliga (women)
12	1. FC Nürnberg	22	2	3	17	15	85	−70	9	Will be relegated to the 2. Bundesliga (women)

== Results ==
Home \ Away	DUI	FRA	SFS	POT	GWB	NEU	WSV	FFC	FSV	SAR	NIE	FCN
FCR Duisburg		1–0	0–1	5–1	4–0	3–0	5–1	4–0	10–0	1–0	5–0	4–0
1. FFC Frankfurt	1–2		3–0	1–2	2–1	2–1	1–0	10–0	1–2	4–0	10–0	10–0
Sportfreunde Siegen	0–6	0–0		1–0	2–1	2–0	1–1	5–0	3–0	2–0	5–2	4–0
1. FFC Turbine Potsdam	3–1	1–0	4–2		1–1	2–0	2–1	5–1	3–2	4–1	0–0	6–0
Grün-Weiß Brauweiler	0–3	1–1	4–3	3–2		2–1	8–0	2–1	4–0	2–1	7–1	4–0
SC 07 Bad Neuenahr	1–2	0–1	3–2	3–1	3–1		3–2	5–1	2–1	1–0	4–2	3–0
WSV Wendschott	0–2	0–0	3–2	2–3	0–0	1–0		4–1	2–1	2–1	1–1	0–0
FFC Flaesheim-Hillen	0–6	1–4	1–6	1–0	1–3	0–4	2–2		2–1	2–1	1–1	4–2
FSV Frankfurt	0–7	0–2	0–1	0–1	2–2	1–2	2–3	5–0		2–0	2–1	1–2
1. FC Saarbrücken	0–3	1–4	0–0	0–1	1–1	2–2	0–5	1–2	3–1		4–0	5–0
TuS Niederkirchen	0–4	0–3	0–3	1–0	0–2	0–3	1–5	1–0	0–1	0–2		2–0
1. FC Nürnberg	2–7	0–6	0–3	2–1	1–1	0–0	0–8	2–3	1–4	1–3	0–3	

Legend: Blue = home team win; Yellow = draw; Red = away team win.

== Top scorers ==
	Player	Team	Goals
1	(Germany) Inka Grings	FCR Duisburg	38
2	(Germany) Claudia Müller	WSV Wendschott	22
3	(Germany) Conny Pohlers	1. FFC Turbine Potsdam	17
3	(Germany) Birgit Prinz	1. FFC Frankfurt	17
3	(Germany) Petra Unterbrink	Grün-Weiß Brauweiler	17
