= 1998–99 Frauen-Bundesliga =

Frauen-Bundesliga
- Season: 1998–99
- Champions: Frankfurt; 1st Bundesliga title 1st German title
- Relegated: Freiburg; Heike Rheine
- Goals: 452
- Average goals/game: 3.42
- Top goalscorer: (Germany) Inka Grings (25)

The 1998–99 Frauen-Bundesliga was the ninth season of the Frauen-Bundesliga, Germany's premier football league. It began on 22 August 1998 and ended on 23 May 1999.

== Final standings ==
Pos	Team	Pld	W	D	L	GF	GA	GD	Pts	Relegation
1	1. FFC Frankfurt	22	19	2	1	96	11	+85	59	1998–99 Bundesliga (women) champions
2	FCR Duisburg	22	18	2	2	77	14	+63	56	
3	Sportfreunde Siegen	22	10	7	5	32	28	+4	37	
4	SSV Turbine Potsdam	22	7	8	7	41	39	+2	29	
5	FSV Frankfurt (Note: 1997–98 Bundesliga (women) champion)	22	7	8	7	26	31	−5	29	
6	WSV Wendschott (Note: Promoted from the 2. Bundesliga (women) last season)	22	7	6	9	39	48	−9	27	
7	1. FC Saarbrücken	22	6	6	10	21	31	−10	24	
8	TuS Niederkirchen	22	7	3	12	26	54	−28	24	
9	Grün-Weiß Brauweiler	22	6	5	11	29	51	−22	23	
10	SC 07 Bad Neuenahr	22	5	8	9	18	43	−25	23	
11	FFC Heike Rheine	22	6	4	12	29	44	−15	22	Will be relegated to the 2. Bundesliga (women)
12	SC Freiburg	22	2	5	15	18	58	−40	11	Will be relegated to the 2. Bundesliga (women)

== Results ==
Home \ Away	FRA	DUI	SFS	POT	FSV	WSV	SAR	NIE	GWB	NEU	HRH	FRE
1. FFC Frankfurt		2–2	6–0	3–0	7–0	10–0	4–0	9–1	3–0	1–0	7–0	3–1
FCR Duisburg	2–0		1–0	4–0	1–2	3–2	1–0	5–0	6–1	7–0	3–1	5–0
Sportfreunde Siegen	0–2	2–6		5–2	2–0	1–1	2–0	2–0	1–1	2–0	3–2	1–0
SSV Turbine Potsdam	4–4	2–1	1–1		1–2	2–3	0–0	2–1	2–2	2–2	4–0	1–0
FSV Frankfurt	0–2	0–0	2–2	2–2		2–2	1–1	2–0	2–0	0–3	3–0	1–2
WSV Wendschott	0–5	0–1	1–1	2–3	2–3		5–1	3–3	7–0	1–2	1–0	2–0
1. FC Saarbrücken	0–2	0–3	0–1	0–1	1–0	3–0		0–1	0–0	2–2	1–0	3–0
TuS Niederkirchen	0–4	0–4	2–1	3–3	3–1	1–2	1–2		2–0	0–0	3–0	3–1
Grün-Weiß Brauweiler	1–6	1–6	0–3	2–1	1–1	0–0	1–2	5–0		1–2	1–0	4–3
SC 07 Bad Neuenahr	0–6	1–5	0–1	0–0	0–0	1–3	1–0	2–0	1–5		2–2	1–0
FFC Heike Rheine	0–3	0–3	0–0	2–1	2–1	5–1	2–2	6–1	2–0	4–0		1–1
SC Freiburg	0–7	0–8	1–1	0–7	0–1	1–1	3–3	0–1	1–3	1–1	3–0	

Legend: Blue = home team win; Yellow = draw; Red = away team win.

== Top scorers ==
	Player	Team	Goals
1	(Germany) Inka Grings	FCR Duisburg	25
2	(Germany) Claudia Müller	WSV Wendschott	20
2	(Germany) Birgit Prinz	1. FFC Frankfurt	20
