= Shelley Thompson (footballer) =

German footballer

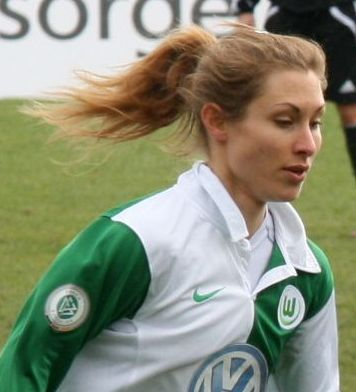

Personal information
- Full name: Shelley Ann Thompson
- Date of birth: 8 February 1984 (age 42)
- Place of birth: Langenfeld, West Germany
- Height: 1.67 m (5 ft 5 1/2 in)
- Position: Forward

Youth career
- 1989–1994: 1. FC Monheim
- 1994–1996: Fortuna Düsseldorf
- 1996–1998: Garather SV
- 1998–1999: SVG Neuss-Weissenberg
- 1999–2000: SG Essen-Schönebeck

Senior career*
Years	Team	Apps	(Gls)
2001–2003	FCR 2001 Duisburg	48	(26)
2003–2004	Regis University Rangers		
2004–2006	FCR 2001 Duisburg	47	(55)
2006–2007	Hamburger SV	21	(16)
2007–2009	VfL Wolfsburg	39	(32)
2010	Atlanta Beat	4	(0)
2010–2012	Bayer 04 Leverkusen	19	(8)
2012–2013	SC 07 Bad Neuenahr	0	(0)
2013	SC 07 Bad Neuenahr II	1	(0)

International career^{‡}
2003–2004	Germany	2	(1)
- * Club domestic league appearances and goals as of 22:35, 30 June 2010 (UTC) ‡ National team caps and goals as of 19 February 2010

Shelley Ann Thompson (born 8 February 1984) is a German football striker. Between 2001 and 2013, she played for several Bundesliga teams, Atlanta Beat (WPS) and Regis University Rangers (Denver, Colorado), and has scored 1 goal in 2 caps for the German national team. She is of South African and Zimbabwean descent.

== Honours ==
- Top scorer Bundesliga: 2005
- Top scorer UEFA Women's Under-19 Championship: 2003
