= Linda Bresonik =

German retired footballer

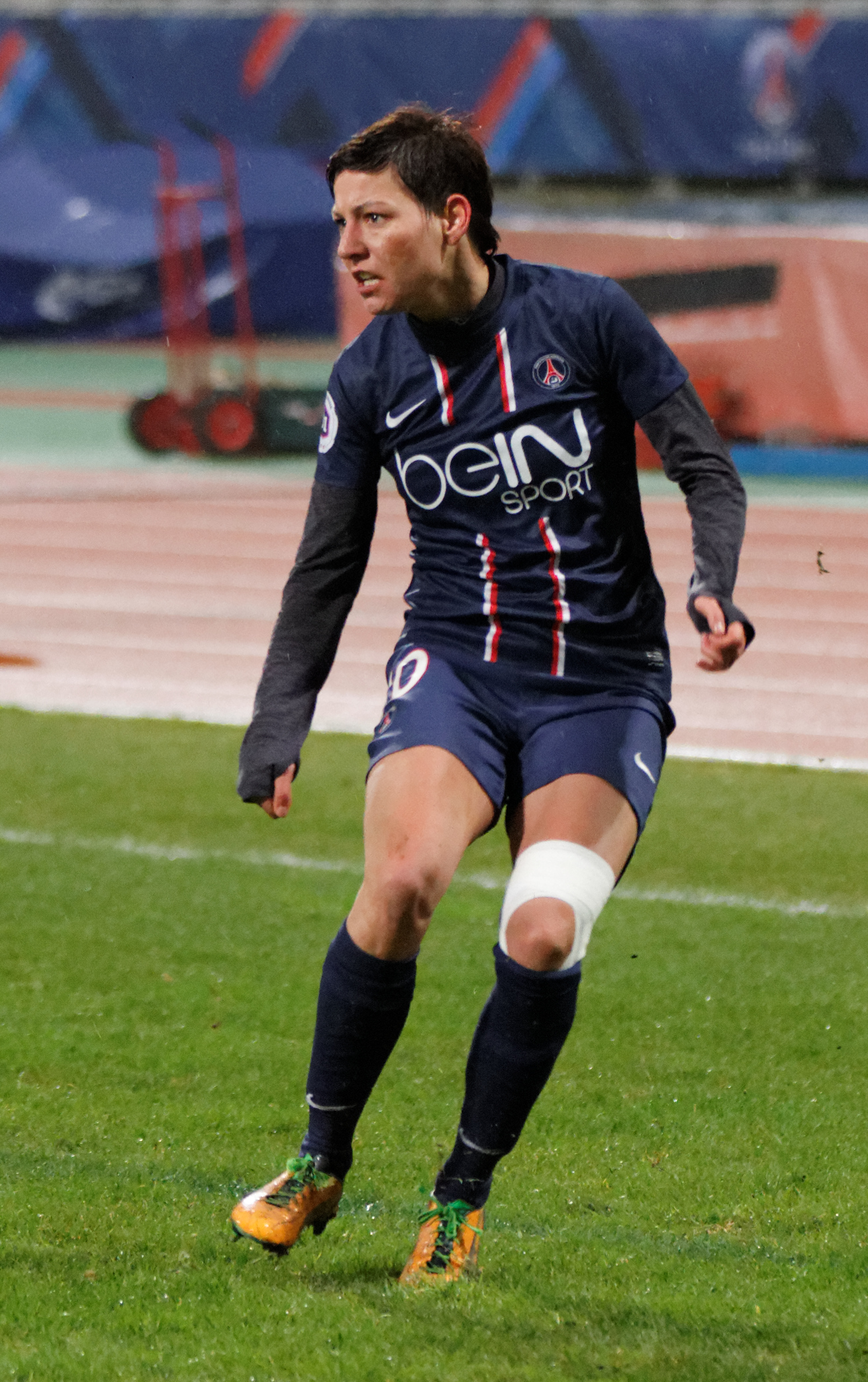
- Bresonik playing for PSG in 2013.

Personal information
- Full name: Linda Bresonik
- Date of birth: 7 December 1983 (age 42)
- Place of birth: Essen, West Germany
- Height: 1.75 m (5 ft 9 in)
- Positions: Defensive midfielder; wing back

Youth career
- 1988–1995: TuS 84/10 Essen
- 1995–2000: Grün-Weiß Schönebeck

Senior career*
Years	Team	Apps	(Gls)
2000–2005	FCR 2001 Duisburg	86	(22)
2005–2006	SC 07 Bad Neuenahr	5	(2)
2006–2008	SG Essen-Schönebeck	39	(20)
2008–2012	FCR 2001 Duisburg	69	(17)
2012–2015	Paris Saint-Germain	37	(20)
2015–2017	MSV Duisburg	28	(7)
2017	BV Cloppenburg	7	(0)
Total		271	(88)

International career
2002	Germany U-19		
2001–2014	Germany	84	(8)
Medal record
Women's football
Representing Germany
FIFA Women's World Cup
Gold medal – first place	2003 United States	Team
Gold medal – first place	2007 China	Team
Olympic Games
Bronze medal – third place	2008 Beijing	Team
UEFA Women's Championship
Gold medal – first place	2001 Germany	Team
Gold medal – first place	2009 Finland	Team
- * Club domestic league appearances and goals

Linda Bresonik (born 7 December 1983) is a German retired footballer. She played as a defensive midfielder or wing back. She mostly played for Duisburg, and many times for Germany.

== Career ==
=== Club ===
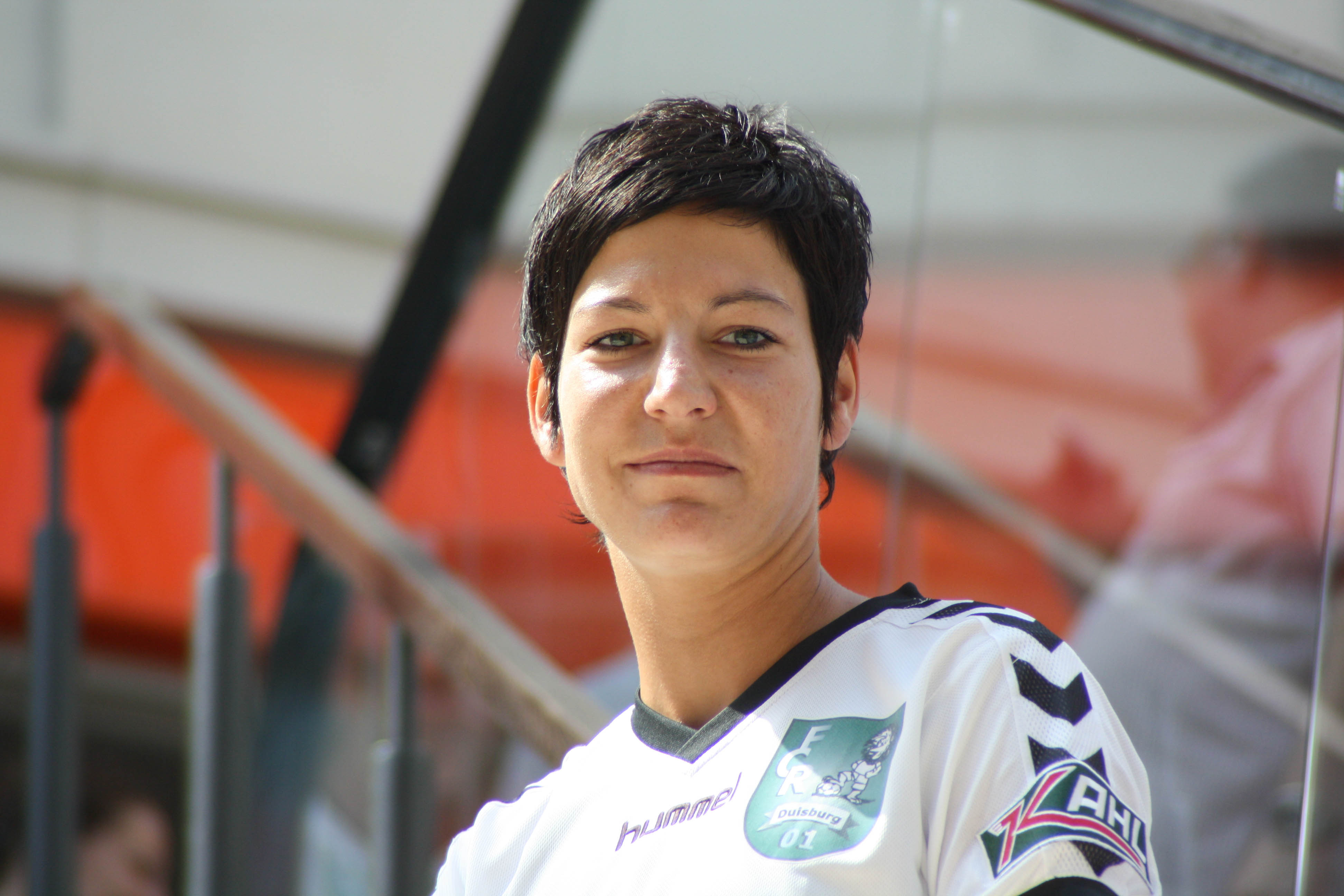
Bresonik with Duisburg in 2010.

Bresonik began her career at the age of five at TuS 84/10 Essen, before moving to Grün-Weiß Schönebeck in 1995. She joined FCR 2001 Duisburg in 2000 and made her Bundesliga debut for the club. In the 2004–05 season, Duisburg finished runner-up in the league. After a falling out with the club, Bresonik transferred to Bundesliga side SC 07 Bad Neuenahr in 2005, but she only appeared in five matches there. One year later she moved to SG Essen-Schönebeck, where she played for two seasons.

In 2008, Bresonik returned to FCR 2001 Duisburg. During her second stint at the club, she had her biggest success at club level, winning the UEFA Women's Cup in the 2008–09 season. She also won the German Cup twice with Duisburg and finished runner-up in the 2009–10 Bundesliga season.

Bresonik and Duisburg teammate Annike Krahn joined Paris Saint-Germain in July 2012, for a transfer fee described as "rekordverdächtig" (possibly record breaking).

In 2015, she joined MSV Duisburg, before leaving for BV Cloppenburg in 2017.

She announced her retirement on 19 December 2017.

=== International ===
Bresonik won the UEFA Women's Under-18 Championship with Germany in 2000. Two years later she came third at the 2002 FIFA U-19 Women's World Championship. Bresonik scored in the penalty shoot-out of the third place play-off. She made her debut for the German senior national team in May 2001 against Italy. Less than two months later, Bresonik won her first major international title at the 2001 European Championship. At the 2003 FIFA Women's World Cup, Bresonik suffered a muscle injury in Germany's second group match. She left the team and returned to Germany, and later only received a third of the pre-arranged winning bonus. Bresonik did not play for the national team for almost four years afterwards.

She eventually returned to the national team at the Four Nations Tournament in January 2007 and was part of Germany's squad that won the 2007 FIFA Women's World Cup. She started in all of the team's six matches. Alongside Kerstin Stegemann, Annike Krahn and Ariane Hingst, Bresonik was part of Germany's defence which did not concede a single goal in the entire tournament. She won the bronze medal at the 2008 Summer Olympics and helped Germany in winning the country's seventh title at the 2009 European Championship. Bresonik was part of Germany's 2011 FIFA Women's World Cup squad.

== International goals ==
No.	Date	Venue	Opponent	Score	Result	Competition
1.	24 August 2009	Ratina Stadion, Tampere, Finland	Norway	1–0	4–0	UEFA Women's Euro 2009
2.	27 August 2009	Ratina Stadion, Tampere, Finland	France	4–0	5–1	UEFA Women's Euro 2009
3.	17 September 2011	Impuls Arena, Augsburg, Germany	Switzerland	3–1	4–1	UEFA Women's Euro 2013 qualifying
4.	15 February 2012	Buca Arena, İzmir, Turkey	Turkey	3–0	5–0	UEFA Women's Euro 2013 qualifying
5.	31 May 2012	Bielefelder Alm, Bielefeld, Germany	Romania	1–0	5–0	UEFA Women's Euro 2013 qualifying

== Honours ==
=== Club ===
FCR 2001 Duisburg

- UEFA Women's Cup: Winner 2008–09
- Bundesliga: Runner-up 2004–05, 2009–10
- German Cup: Winner 2008–09, 2009–10, Runner-up 2002–03

=== International ===
- FIFA Women's World Cup: Winner 2003, 2007
- UEFA Women's Championship: Winner 2001, 2009
- Summer Olympic Games: Bronze medal 2008
- FIFA U-20 Women's World Cup: Third-place 2002
- UEFA Women's Under-19 Championship: Winner 2000

=== Individual ===
- Silbernes Lorbeerblatt
