= Germany women's national under-21 football team =

National U-21 association football team

Germany U-21
- Association: Deutscher Fußball-Bund
| First colours | Second colours |

The Germany women's national under-21 football team represents the female under-21s of Germany and is controlled by the German Football Association, the governing body of football in Germany. The team has not been active since 2006.
