= FCR 2001 Duisburg =

German football club

- Full name: Fußballclub Rumeln 2001 Duisburg
- Nickname: Löwinnen (Lionesses)
- Founded: 8 June 2001
- Dissolved: 2013
- Ground: PCC-Stadion
- Capacity: 3,000
- League: Defunct
Home colours	Away colours

FCR 2001 Duisburg (full name: Fußballclub Rumeln 2001 Duisburg) was a German women's football club from Duisburg. The first team played in the Bundesliga. They originate from a women's team formed in 1977 under the umbrella of FC Rumeln-Kaldenhausen and have existed as an independent club since 8 June 2001. The colors of the 400-member-strong club are green and white. The first team of FCR 2001 Duisburg, who carry the nickname of "Die Löwinnen" (lionesses), have played in the Bundesliga since gaining promotion in 1993. Winning the UEFA Women's Cup in 2009 and with past success in the German championship (2000) and the cup (twice), FCR Duisburg was one of the top teams in German women's football. In 2013 the club filed for insolvency and players joined and formed a new women's section at MSV Duisburg.

== History ==
=== FC Rumeln-Kaldenhausen (1977–1997) ===
The roots of the club can be traced back to the year 1955 and the foundation of FC Rumeln-Kaldenhausen. A women's football section was established in 1977. In 1990 they were promoted to the Regionalliga West. In their first season they finished sixth, but the following season were runners-up, one point behind STV Lövenich. Going into the last game of the resulting promotion play-off, Duisburg only had to draw against Lövenich to go up. However, playing at home Lövenich won 5–3 and Delmenhorst managed to squeeze past Duisburg with a 6–0 win over SSV Turbine Potsdam

In the following 1992–93 season, Duisburg were champions of the Regionalliga West, two points ahead of SG Wattenscheid 09. The promotion play-offs went more successfully this time and they won promotion in their penultimate game, winning 6–2 against Wattenscheid. Their single defeat in the play-offs was against fellow promotion winners Schmalfelder SV. The first season in the Bundesliga was marked by struggle against relegation. In the end they finished eighth in the Northern Group and were able to stay up while SV Bergisch Gladbach 09 and local Rumeln rivals KBC Duisburg, clubs both full of tradition, had to suffer demotion to the second tier.

For the 1994–95 season, the team was considerably strengthened. The most spectacular newcomer was the international Martina Voss. Following the birth of her daughter, she no longer wanted to travel regularly between her hometown of Duisburg and her club TSV Siegen. From relegated local rivals KBC came the later international Melanie Hoffmann. For an extended period, FCR were running head-to-head with TSV Siegen for second position in the Northern Group, a position which was awarded by a place in the semi-finals of the German Championship. The matter was settled favorably on the 15th match day, when Rumeln beat Siegen 4–3. Rumeln finished second and Maren Meinert was top scorer in the Northern Group with 21 goals. In the semi-final they met FSV Frankfurt, who had won all their games in the Southern Group. After a 2–2 draw in the first leg, Frankfurt won the return match by 5–1 and went on to win the Championship beating Grün-Weiß Brauweiler.

In 1995, striker Inka Grings transferred from Garather SV. She was to become one of the most successful goalscorers in the Bundesliga during the 1995–96 season. Finishing third in the Northern Group, the team missed out on the semi-finals this time. On the other hand, they were more successful in the DFB Cup where they reached the semi-finals for the first time but lost to the later winners FSV Frankfurt 2–0. The first title achieved in the whole history of the club was gained on 3 February 1996 in Koblenz when, in the DFB-Hallenpokal FCR beat TSV Siegen 3–2.

For most teams, the 1996/97 season was dominated by thoughts of qualification for the new single-division Bundesliga. Duisburg were successful in the Northern Group and going into the last game, the team had two points advantage in leading position over Grün-Weiß Brauweiler who were indeed their opponents in this last game, played at Duisburg. However, Brauweiler proved better at subduing their nerves and came away 5–4 winners. In the semi-finals, the team were able to turn a 2–1 defeat from the first leg against FSV Frankfurt into victory with a 3–1 win in the second leg. On 8 June, Duisburg faced Brauweiler again in the final and 5,000 spectators in Homberg witnessed a dramatic game. After 90 minutes the game was scoreless. Shortly after the beginning of extra time, Grings put her team in front but three minutes before the final whistle, Patricia Menge equalized. The decision had to go to a penalty shootout. With the situation 4–3 for Brauweiler Daniela Arndt missed her kick. Claudia Klein then scored for Brauweiler, thus making her team the German champions.

=== FCR Duisburg 55 (1997–2001) ===
During the first season of the new single-division Bundesliga, FC Rumeln-Kaldenhausen changed their name to FCR Duisburg 55. After a 6–1 victory over Hamburger SV FCR became the initial table leaders, but finished the season in third place. The team were more successful in the DFB-Cup, where they reached the final for the first time ever. In a game producing more goals than any final in the cup's history, the champions FSV Frankfurt were beaten 6–2. With three goals, Inka Grings proved to be their most impressive player

For the 1998–99 season, international Kerstin Stegemann came to Duisburg from FC Eintracht Rheine. The team became engaged in a protracted and exciting race for the title with 1. FFC Frankfurt. The outcome was decided on the 17th match day when Duisburg only came away with a goalless draw at FSV Frankfurt, while 1 FFC Frankfurt beat Brauweiler 6–1. Frankfurt became champions with Duisburg again as runners-up. With 25 goals, Inka Grings secured for herself the title of Torschützenkönigin. The Duisburgerinnen were unable to repeat their cup win. In the final Duiisburg were beaten 1–0 by 1. FFC Frankfurt.

The 1999–2000 season was to be the most successful in the club's history. The team dominated the Bundesliga and right from the start notched up a run of 16 victories in a row. The championship was already wound up with four games still to go, when they beat SC 07 Bad Neuenahr 3–0. Inka Grings was Torschützenkönigin again. Her record of 38 goals still stands to this day. The Löwinnen also tasted success in Hallen Football and won the Hallen cup for the second time.

The success of the season was overshadowed by the death of their long-time executive director and main sponsor Jochen Zufall. In order to make up for this loss, a support organization was set up for which the club was able to gradually gain many small-scale sponsors. Nevertheless, the club had to suffer the loss of players - with the departure of Kerstin Stegemann and Maren Meinert they lost two top-class players. On the plus side some talented players arrived, such as the later internationals Linda Bresonik and Shelley Thompson.

There were problems behind the scenes also. With financial aid from the City of Duisburg and North Rhine-Westphalia, the main club gained a piece of land specifically for their women's Bundesliga section. The main club, however, refused to limit the use of the ground to training and thus preserving the grass. The men's team, who had just been relegated to the Kreisliga, were allowed to use the ground as often as they pleased. These conflicts with the main club were to lead shortly afterwards to the female footballers founding their own independent club. The 2000–01 season finished with the team in third place.

=== FCR 2001 Duisburg (2001–2013) ===
On 8 June 2001, the women's football section split their ties to their mother club and declared themselves to be independent, taking the name FCR 2001 Duisburg. The men continued to play as FCR 1955 Duisburg, in the Kreisliga B. By virtue of this re-founding, there were hopes of better opportunities in marketing, so as to keep up with the leading clubs in German women's football such as 1. FFC Frankfurt and 1. FFC Turbine Potsdam. And they were also taking into account the growing professionalism in women's football. The club's regulations are based on those of male professional football, so in addition to the executive a board of directors was installed. Additionally the Stadtsparkasse Duisburg (a savings bank) was gained as the main sponsor.

While the team were exercising their first year of independence, some unrest arose in November 2001. Trainer Jürgen Krust was suspended for allegedly sexually harassing a player. The accusations were later withdrawn and the suspension was consequently lifted. The team finished in third place for two seasons in a row and in 2002–03 Inka Grings became top scorer for the third time with a tally for the season of 20 goals. And in 2003 the "Löwinnen" made their third appearance in the cup final. Against the highly favored 1. FFC Frankfurt, the young team looked set to be participants in a goalless draw. However, in the 89th minute, Pia Wunderlich took a free kick in front of the Duisburg goal, which Martina Voss, who was playing the last match of her career, deflected into her own goal.

For the 2003–04 season, the club moved from the "Am Waldborn" into the newly constructed PCC-Stadium. New players Silke Rottenberg and Linda Bresonik traveled with the German national team to participate in the World Cup in the US, which was indeed won by Deutschland. In the Bundesliga, the team ended only in fourth place after a messy season. In the summer of 2004 three new talents, Fatmire Bajramaj, Annike Krahn, and Simone Laudehr were signed, all of whom were to become class players and internationals. With the help of the freely scoring duo of Shelley Thompson (top scorer with 30 goals in the season) and Inka Grings (25 goals), the Löwinnen reached second place at the end of the 2004–05 season. Grings was with the German international team which became European champions in summer 2005 and won the title of top scorer with four goals.

In spite of success on the field, at the end of the season trainer Jürgen Krust had to go. His successor was Dietmar Herhaus. The 2005–06 season was marked by a three-cornered fight for the title. Apart from Duisburg, Potsdam and Frankfurt all had strong hopes of the title as the season progressed. The outcome was decided on the 18th match day, when FCR lost against Potsdam 2–1. A 4–0 home win on the last day of the season secured for Duisburg yet again the runners-up position. After the close of the season, two top players left the club: Rottenberg (to Frankfurt) and Thompson (to Hamburger SV).

The 2006–07 season turned out to be turbulent. On the third match day, Duisburg were beaten at home 6–1 by 1. FFC Frankfurt. After the game, an argument developed between manager Herhaus and Inka Grings, as Herhaus expressed his dissatisfaction with her performance. After Herhaus relieved Grings of the post of team captain, she used various newspaper interviews to express harsh criticism of Herhaus's training methods and announced she would request a transfer if nothing changed in the training camp. The club responded by suspending the striker. On 16 November 2006, Herhaus surprisingly resigned, and after discussion Grings returned to the team. Within the club peace reigned again and they strove for the title under a new manager Thomas Obliers. However, in the third-to-last game of the season, FCR were beaten 1–0 by Potsdam, resulting in Duisburg occupying runners-up place for the third season in a row.

In the cup, the team reached the final for the fourth time where they met old rivals 1. FFC Frankfurt. An early lead through Renate Lingor was equalized by Sonja Fuss shortly before half-time. No other goals were forthcoming and the game had to go to a penalty shoot-out. Surprisingly manager Obliers changed the goalkeeper for this shoot-out—replacing Kathrin Längert, Lena Hofeld now stood between the posts. This change was to have no effect. While the 'Frankfurterinnen' hit the back of the net at every attempt, Ursula Holl was able to save shots from Vanessa Martini and Patricia Hanebeck.

The German national team contained four Duisburgerinnen for the 2007 World Cup in China. The German eleven were able to defend their title with a 2–0 win in the final over Brazil. Simone Laudehr's header which produced Deutschland's second goal was voted by the viewers of the ARD-Sportschau (a sports program) as the goal of the month. In the Bundesliga, the "Löwinnen" again sought the championship. In February 2008, manager Trainer Thomas unexpectedly resigned. Martina Voss took over the team, which had hit rock bottom through unnecessary loss of points, among them a 4–1 home defeat against Essen. On the penultimate day of the season, a 1–1 draw against the table leaders 1. FFC Frankfurt held out the possibility of a positive outcome. However, both clubs won their last match, resulting in Duisburg becoming runners-up for the fourth time in a row.

Before the 2008–09 season, the German national team traveled to the Olympic Games in Beijing. With the help of two goals from Fatmire Bajramaj, Deutschland won Bronze medal for the third time in a row. For the first time, FCR took part in the UEFA Women's Cup. The club reached the semi-finals unbeaten where the Duisburgerinnen were able to spring a surprise by knocking out the French representative Olympique Lyon. With a 6–0 victory in the first leg of the final against Zvezda 2005 Perm from Russia, Martina Voss's team had already made the outcome a foregone conclusion. In the return leg, which was played out in the MSV-Arena, the game ended 1–1, so the "Löwinnen" became the third German team to win the European Cup. With 28,112 spectators, FCR notched up a new world attendance record for women's club football. The club also reached the cup final again, which for the time being was the last one to be played in Berlin. After a hotly contested start to the game against 1. FFC Turbine Potsdam, the Duisburgerinnen played a storm and won 7–0, the highest final victory of all time. Annemieke Kiesel and Inka Grings both scored twice.

After a runner-up finish in the 2008–09 Bundesliga the teams qualified for the 2009–10 season the team new Women's Champions League, successor of the UEFA Cup. Duisburg reached the semi-finals, where they only lost in a penalty shoot-out to the eventual winner Turbine Potsdam. The 2010–11 Bundesliga season did not go as planned, after losing key games in the league and the cup quarter-final the coach, Martina Voss, was sacked and replaced by interims coach Marco Ketelaer. The team again went through to the Champions League semi-finals.

=== MSV Duisburg (2014–) ===
In 2012 FCR Duisburg suffered a financial crisis and lost several leading players to rival clubs, including Alexandra Popp, Annike Krahn and Simone Laudehr. In January 2013 it narrowly avoided going bankrupt, but it managed to end the campaign and retain its position in the Bundesliga for the 2013–14 season. On 1 January 2014, the club was absorbed by MSV Duisburg, becoming its women's section.

== Honours ==
- Bundesliga:
  - Champions: 2000
  - Runners-up: 1995, 1997, 1999, 2005, 2006, 2007, 2008, 2010
- DFB Cup:
  - Winners: 1998, 2009, 2010
  - Runners-up: 1999, 2003, 2007
- Indoor Championship:
  - Winners: 1996, 2000
  - Runners-up: 1995, 1999, 2006
- UEFA Cup:
  - Winners: 2009

== Record in UEFA competitions ==
All results (away, home and aggregate) list Duisburg's goal tally first.

Competition	Round	Club	Away	Home	Aggregate
2008–09	Second qualifying round	(Ukraine) Naftokhimik Kalush (Host)	–	5–1	–
2008–09	Second qualifying round	(Spain) Levante Valencia	–	5–0	–
2008–09	Second qualifying round	(Denmark) Brøndby	–	4–1	–
2008–09	Quarter-final	(Germany) Frankfurt	3–1 ^{a}	2–0	5–1
2008–09	Semi-final	(France) Olympique Lyon	1–1 ^{a}	3–1	4–2
2008–09	Final	(Russia) Zvezda Perm	6–0 ^{a}	1–1	7–1
2009–10	Round of 32	(Belarus) Universitet Vitebsk	5–1 ^{a}	6–3	11–4
2009–10	Round of 16	(Sweden) Linköping	2–0	1–1 ^{a}	3–1
2009–10	Quarter-Final	(England) Arsenal	2–0	2–1 ^{a}	4–1
2009–10	Semi-Final	(Germany) Turbine Potsdam	0–1 a.e.t.	1–0 ^{a}	1–1 (1p–3p)
2010–11	Qualifying round	(Slovakia) Slovan Bratislava	–	3–0	–
2010–11	Qualifying round	(Northern Ireland) Crusaders Newtownabbey Strikers (Host)	–	6–1	–
2010–11	Qualifying round	(Scotland) Glasgow City	–	4–0	–
2010–11	Round of 32	(Kazakhstan) Kairat Almaty	5–0 ^{a}	6–0	11–0
2010–11	Round of 16	(Denmark) Fortuna Hjørring	3–0	4–2 ^{a}	7–2
2010–11	Quarter-Final	(England) Everton	3–1 ^{a}	2–1	5–2
2010–11	Semi-Final	(Germany) Turbine Potsdam	0–1	2–2 ^{a}	2–3

^{a} First leg.

== Ground ==
From 2003 to 2013 the home games of FCR 2001 Duisburg were played at the 3,000-capacity PCC-Stadion in the Duisburg district of Homberg. They share the stadium with VfB Homberg, a male team currently playing in the Oberliga. Previously FCR played at "Am Waldborn" in Rumeln-Kaldenhausen. During the 2009/10 season, the club was playing its home games in the UEFA Champions League at the Stadion Niederrhein (Lower Rhine Stadium) in Oberhausen, because the floodlights in the PCC-Stadium did not meet the requirements laid down by UEFA.

== Players ==
=== Former internationals ===
- Belgium: Femke Maes
- Denmark: Stina Lykke Petersen
- Germany: Fatmire Bajramaj, Linda Bresonik, Sonja Fuss, Inka Grings, Ursula Holl, Annike Krahn, Simone Laudehr, Maren Meinert, Alexandra Popp, Sandra Smisek, Shelley Thompson, Martina Voss-Tecklenburg, Luisa Wensing, Marina Hegering
- Iceland: Margrét Lára Viðarsdóttir
- Japan: Kozue Ando
- Netherlands: Annemieke Kiesel, Lieke Martens, Mirte Roelvink
- (United States) USA: Ashlyn Harris
