= 2008 FIFA U-20 Women's World Cup squads =

This article lists the team squads of the 2008 FIFA U-20 Women's World Cup.

== Group A ==
=== Chile ===
Head coach: (Spain) Marta Tejedor

No.	Pos.	Player	Date of birth (age)	Caps	Goals	Club
1	GK	Romina Parraguirre	22 September 1990 (aged 18)			(Football Federation of Chile) Colo-Colo
2	DF	Valentina Lefort	26 January 1988 (aged 20)			(Football Federation of Chile) Universidad de Chile
3	DF	Javiera Guajardo	26 September 1989 (aged 19)			(Football Federation of Chile) Universidad de Chile
4	DF	Cyntia Aguilar	22 November 1989 (aged 18)			(Football Federation of Chile) Colo-Colo
5	DF	Tatiana Pérez	23 October 1988 (aged 20)			(Football Federation of Chile) Santiago Morning
6	MF	Pamela Coihuín	20 May 1990 (aged 18)			(Football Federation of Chile) Colo-Colo
7	GK	Claudia Endler	23 July 1991 (aged 17)			(Football Federation of Chile) Unión La Calera
8	MF	Karen Araya	16 October 1990 (aged 18)			(Football Federation of Chile) Unión La Calera
9	FW	Nathalie Quezada	21 June 1989 (aged 19)			(Football Federation of Chile) Unión La Calera
10	FW	Mayorie Hernández	20 March 1990 (aged 18)			(Football Federation of Chile) Universidad de Chile
11	FW	Daniela Zamora	13 November 1990 (aged 17)			(Football Federation of Chile) Unión La Calera
12	GK	Karla Ureta	12 June 1989 (aged 19)			(Football Federation of Chile) Santiago Morning
13	DF	Dominique Hisis	17 April 1990 (aged 18)			(Football Federation of Chile) Colo-Colo
14	MF	Daniela Pardo (captain)	9 May 1988 (aged 20)			(Football Federation of Chile) Unión La Calera
15	DF	Juanita Peña	25 August 1989 (aged 19)			(Football Federation of Chile) Santiago Morning
16	MF	María Mardones	24 March 1989 (aged 19)			(Football Federation of Chile) Unión La Calera
17	DF	Geraldine Leyton	11 May 1989 (aged 19)			(Football Federation of Chile) Santiago Morning
18	MF	Daniela Fuenzalida	16 December 1990 (aged 17)			(Football Federation of Chile) Santiago Morning
19	FW	Andrea Zúniga	24 January 1989 (aged 19)			(Football Federation of Chile) Santiago Morning
20	MF	Carol Negrón	25 September 1989 (aged 19)			(Football Federation of Chile) Universidad de Chile
21	MF	Valeska Baigorrí	25 August 1989 (aged 19)			(Football Federation of Chile) Santiago Morning

=== England ===
Head coach: Mo Marley

#	Name	Club	Date of Birth (Age)	Pld	Goal	Booked	(yellow card) (yellow-red card)	Sent off (straight red)
Goalkeepers
1	Rebecca Spencer	(England) Arsenal	22 February 1991 (aged 17)	0	0	0	0	0
13	Ashley Baker	(United States) Georgia Bulldogs	15 March 1990 (aged 18)	0	0	0	0	0
21	Helen Alderson	(England) Sunderland	7 May 1989 (aged 19)	0	0	0	0	0
Defenders
2	Steph Houghton	(England) Leeds Carnegie	23 April 1988 (aged 20)	0	0	0	0	0
3	Claire Rafferty	(England) Chelsea	1 November 1989 (aged 19)	0	0	0	0	0
5	Fern Whelan	(England) Everton	12 May 1988 (aged 20)	0	0	0	0	0
6	Sophie Bradley	(England) Leeds Carnegie	20 October 1989 (aged 19)	0	0	0	0	0
12	Chelsea Weston	(England) Doncaster Rovers Belles	27 January 1990 (aged 18)	0	0	0	0	0
15	Gilly Flaherty	(England) Arsenal	24 August 1991 (aged 17)	0	0	0	0	0
16	Kerys Harrop	(England) Birmingham City	3 December 1990 (aged 17)	0	0	0	0	0
Midfielders
4	Danielle Buet	(England) Chelsea	31 October 1988 (aged 20)	0	0	0	0	0
8	Remi Allen	(England) Leicester	15 October 1990 (aged 18)	0	0	0	0	0
10	Rachel Williams	(England) Doncaster Rovers Belles	10 January 1988 (aged 20)	0	0	0	0	0
14	Brooke Chaplen	(England) Chelsea	16 April 1989 (aged 19)	0	0	0	0	0
18	Michelle Hinnigan	(England) Everton	12 June 1990 (aged 18)	0	0	0	0	0
19	Sophie Walton	(England) Leeds Carnegie	11 July 1989 (aged 19)	0	0	0	0	0
Forwards
7	Toni Duggan	(England) Everton	25 July 1991 (aged 17)	0	0	0	0	0
9	Natasha Dowie	(England) Everton	30 June 1988 (aged 20)	0	0	0	0	0
11	Jessica Clarke	(England) Leeds Carnegie	5 May 1989 (aged 19)	0	0	0	0	0
17	Rebecca Hall	(England) Birmingham City	5 September 1988 (aged 20)	0	0	0	0	0
20	Jade Moore	(England) Leeds Carnegie	22 October 1989 (aged 19)	0	0	0	0	0

=== New Zealand ===
Head coach: (England) John Herdman

#	Name	Club	Date of Birth (Age)	Pld	Goal	Booked	(yellow card) (yellow-red card)	Sent off (straight red)
Goalkeepers
1	Charlotte Wood	(New Zealand) Three Kings United	11 May 1991 (aged 17)	3	0	1	0	0
13	Victoria Esson	(New Zealand) Coastal Spirit	3 June 1991 (aged 17)	0	0	0	0	0
21	Rebekah Brook	(New Zealand) Northern AFC	19 May 1989 (aged 19)	0	0	0	0	0
Defenders
3	Anna Green	(New Zealand) Three Kings United	20 August 1990 (aged 18)	2	0	0	0	0
5	Bridgette Armstrong	(New Zealand) Glenfield Rovers	9 November 1992 (aged 16)	3	0	0	0	0
6	Abby Erceg	(New Zealand) Western Springs	20 November 1989 (aged 18)	3	0	0	0	0
7	Ria Percival	(United States) F.C. Indiana	7 December 1989 (aged 18)	2	2	0	1	0
15	Elizabeth Milne	(New Zealand) Western Springs	11 December 1990 (aged 17)	3	0	1	0	0
16	Briony Fisher	(New Zealand) Western Springs	22 August 1991 (aged 17)	0	0	0	0	0
17	Nicole Stratford	(New Zealand) Three Kings United	11 November 1990 (aged 18)	0	0	0	0	0
Midfielders
2	Caitlin Campbell	(New Zealand) Glenfield Rovers	2 February 1991 (aged 17)	3	0	0	0	0
4	Katie Hoyle	(New Zealand) Lynn-Avon United	1 February 1988 (aged 20)	3	0	0	1	0
8	Betsy Hassett	(New Zealand) Three Kings United	8 April 1990 (aged 18)	3	0	0	0	0
10	Annalie Longo	(New Zealand) Three Kings United	7 January 1991 (aged 17)	2	0	0	0	0
12	Chelsey Wood	(New Zealand) Western Springs	23 June 1990 (aged 18)	0	0	0	0	0
18	Grace Vincent	(New Zealand) Western Springs	15 March 1988 (aged 20)	1	0	0	0	0
20	Rosie White	(New Zealand) Western Springs	6 June 1993 (aged 15)	3	3	0	0	0
Forwards
9	Renee Leota	(New Zealand) Miramar Rangers	16 May 1990 (aged 18)	3	1	0	0	0
11	Hannah Wall	(New Zealand) Western Springs	3 May 1991 (aged 17)	3	0	0	0	0
14	Merissa Smith	(New Zealand) Three Kings United	11 November 1990 (aged 18)	2	0	0	0	0
19	Sarah McLaughlin	(New Zealand) Claudelands Rovers	6 March 1991 (aged 17)	3	1	0	0	0

=== Nigeria ===
Head coach: Daniel Evumena

No.	Pos.	Player	Date of birth (age)	Caps	Goals	Club
1	GK	Marbel Egwuenu	15 December 1991 (aged 16)			(Nigeria Football Federation) Delta Queens
2	DF	Margaret Dike	21 November 1991 (aged 16)			(Nigeria Football Federation) Nasarawa Amazons
3	MF	Glory Iroka	3 January 1990 (aged 18)			(Nigeria Football Federation) Rivers Angels
4	FW	Chioma Nwabueze	14 January 1990 (aged 18)			(Nigeria Football Federation) Delta Queens
5	DF	Esther Eno Edem	7 May 1989 (aged 19)			(Nigeria Football Federation) Nasarawa Amazons
6	DF	Esther Michael	16 November 1992 (aged 16)			(Nigeria Football Federation) Nasarawa Amazons
7	FW	Tawa Ishola	23 December 1988 (aged 19)			(Nigeria Football Federation) Bayelsa Queens
8	FW	Ebere Orji	23 December 1992 (aged 15)			(Nigeria Football Federation) Bayelsa Queens
9	FW	Ogonna Chukwudi	14 September 1988 (aged 20)			(Nigeria Football Federation) Nasarawa Amazons
10	MF	Rita Chikwelu	6 March 1988 (aged 20)			(Football Association of Finland) United Pietarsaari
11	FW	Bukola Saheed	30 June 1989 (aged 19)			(Nigeria Football Federation) Pelican Stars
12	GK	Charity John	28 November 1991 (aged 16)			(Nigeria Football Federation) Rivers Angels
13	FW	Sarah Michael	22 July 1990 (aged 18)			(Nigeria Football Federation) Delta Queens
14	FW	Faustina Ugwuadu	28 July 1989 (aged 19)			(Nigeria Football Federation) Delta Queens
15	DF	Joy Jegede	16 December 1991 (aged 16)			(Nigeria Football Federation) Delta Queens
16	DF	Ulunma Jerome	11 April 1988 (aged 20)			(Nigeria Football Federation) Rivers Angels
17	DF	Helen Ukaonu	17 May 1991 (aged 17)			(Nigeria Football Federation) Delta Queens
18	MF	Rebecca Kalu	12 June 1990 (aged 18)			(Nigeria Football Federation) Delta Queens
19	MF	Esther Victor	12 July 1991 (aged 17)			(Nigeria Football Federation) Makwada Queens
20	FW	Chidinma Anoruo	28 May 1989 (aged 19)			(Nigeria Football Federation) Bayelsa Queens
21	GK	Onyekachi Mbalisi	6 December 1990 (aged 17)			(Nigeria Football Federation) Delta Queens

== Group B ==
=== Argentina ===
Head coach: (Japan) Yasushi Kawakami

No.	Pos.	Player	Date of birth (age)	Caps	Goals	Club
1	GK	Guadalupe Calello	13 April 1990 (aged 18)			(Argentine Football Association) River Plate
2	MF	Gabriela Chávez	9 April 1989 (aged 19)			(Argentine Football Association) Independiente
3	DF	Noelia Espíndola	6 April 1992 (aged 16)			(Argentine Football Association) San Lorenzo
4	DF	Yanina Hernández	4 May 1992 (aged 16)			(Argentine Football Association) Boca Juniors
5	MF	Emilia Mendieta	4 February 1988 (aged 20)			(Argentine Football Association) River Plate
6	DF	Daiana Cardone	1 January 1989 (aged 19)			(Argentine Football Association) Independiente
7	FW	Victoria Bedini	10 August 1990 (aged 18)			(Argentine Football Association) Boca Juniors
8	FW	Soledad Jaimes	20 January 1989 (aged 19)			(Argentine Football Association) Boca Juniors
9	MF	Joanna Bracamonte	21 June 1989 (aged 19)			(Argentine Football Association) Independiente
10	FW	Belén Potassa	12 December 1988 (aged 19)			(Argentine Football Association) San Lorenzo
11	MF	Florencia Mandrile	10 February 1988 (aged 20)			(Argentine Football Association) San Lorenzo
12	GK	Carolina Velek	25 October 1988 (aged 20)			(Argentine Football Association) AFA
13	DF	Andrea López	4 October 1991 (aged 17)			(Argentine Football Association) River Plate
14	DF	Virginia Gómez	26 February 1991 (aged 17)			(Argentine Football Association) AFA
15	MF	Vanesa Santana	3 September 1990 (aged 18)			(Argentine Football Association) River Plate
16	DF	Gabriela López	13 January 1989 (aged 19)			(Argentine Football Association) River Plate
17	FW	Florencia Ferrero	5 March 1989 (aged 19)			(Argentine Football Association) Independiente
18	MF	Carina Núñez	11 June 1991 (aged 17)			(Argentine Football Association) San Lorenzo
19	MF	Mariana Larroquette	24 October 1992 (aged 16)			(Argentine Football Association) AFA
20	MF	María Penalva	12 July 1990 (aged 18)			(Argentine Football Association) AFA
21	GK	Brenda Reyes	1 May 1991 (aged 17)			(Argentine Football Association) San Lorenzo

=== China PR ===
Head coach: Zhang Guilai

No.	Pos.	Player	Date of birth (age)	Caps	Goals	Club
1	GK	Chi Xiaohui	2 September 1989 (aged 19)			(Chinese Football Association) Shandong Luneng
2	DF	Wang Lingling	18 June 1988 (aged 20)			(Chinese Football Association) Beijing Chengjian
3	DF	Li Danyang	8 April 1990 (aged 18)			(Chinese Football Association) Liaoning Hongyun
4	DF	Ruan Xiaoqing	14 May 1988 (aged 20)			(Chinese Football Association) Jiangsu Huatai
5	DF	Weng Xinzhi (captain)	15 June 1988 (aged 20)			(Chinese Football Association) Jiangsu Huatai
6	MF	Zhang Rui	17 January 1989 (aged 19)			(Chinese Football Association) Army Club
7	MF	Xu Wenjia	20 October 1989 (aged 19)			(Chinese Football Association) Shanghai SMG
8	FW	Zhu Wei	20 August 1988 (aged 20)			(Chinese Football Association) Jiangsu Huatai
9	FW	Gu Yasha	28 November 1990 (aged 17)			(Chinese Football Association) Beijing Chengjian
10	MF	Lou Jiahui	26 May 1991 (aged 17)			(Chinese Football Association) Henan Jianye
11	FW	Li Lin	3 April 1988 (aged 20)			(Chinese Football Association) Dalian Haichang
12	FW	Li Wen	21 February 1989 (aged 19)			(Chinese Football Association) Liaoning Hongyun
13	MF	Li Dongna	6 December 1988 (aged 19)			(Chinese Football Association) Tianjin Huisen
14	FW	Xu Yanfen	15 May 1988 (aged 20)			(Chinese Football Association) Beijing Chengjian
15	MF	Qu Shanshan	18 July 1990 (aged 18)			(Chinese Football Association) Beijing Chengjian
16	DF	Zeng Xiulan	18 June 1990 (aged 18)			(Chinese Football Association) Guangzhou Yiyao
17	MF	Liu Shukun	16 June 1989 (aged 19)			(Chinese Football Association) Shanghai SMG
18	DF	Pang Fengyue	19 January 1989 (aged 19)			(Chinese Football Association) Liaoning Hongyun
19	MF	Mao Aihong	6 October 1989 (aged 19)			(Chinese Football Association) Beijing Chengjian
20	GK	Zhang Yue	30 September 1990 (aged 18)			(Chinese Football Association) Beijing Chengjian
21	GK	Wang Shimeng	5 December 1990 (aged 17)			(Chinese Football Association) Tianjin Huisen

=== France ===
- Head coach: Stephane Pilard

#	Name	Club	Date of Birth (Age)	Pld	Goal	Booked	(yellow card) (yellow-red card)	Sent off (straight red)
Goalkeepers
1	Méline Gérard	(France) Montigny-le-Bretonneux	30 May 1990 (aged 18)	2	0	0	0	0
16	Karima Benameur	(France) St. Étienne	13 April 1989 (aged 19)	3	0	0	0	0
21	Alisson Branger	(France) Gravelines	19 November 1988 (aged 20)	0	0	0	0	0
Defenders
2	Gwenaëlle Butel	(France) Juvisy	9 January 1989 (aged 19)	5	0	0	0	0
3	Emilie Gonsollin	(France) Nord Allier	22 August 1988 (aged 20)	5	0	0	0	0
4	Wendie Renard	(France) FCF Lyon	20 July 1990 (aged 18)	4	0	0	0	0
5	Laura Agard	(France) Montpellier	26 July 1989 (aged 19)	5	0	0	0	0
12	Livia Jean	(France) Stade Briochin	24 July 1988 (aged 20)	1	0	0	0	0
13	Delphine Chatelin	(France) Toulouse	17 May 1988 (aged 20)	1	0	0	0	0
Midfielders
6	Charlotte Bilbault	(France) Soyaux	5 June 1990 (aged 18)	5	0	0	0	0
8	Mélissa Plaza	(France) La Roche/Yon	28 July 1988 (aged 20)	5	0	2	0	0
14	Ludivine Bultel	(France) Henin-Beaumont	7 July 1989 (aged 19)	1	0	0	0	0
15	Kheira Hamraoui	(France) St. Étienne	13 January 1990 (aged 18)	4	0	0	0	0
17	Nora Coton-Pélagie	(France) Paris Saint-Germain	22 April 1988 (aged 20)	4	2	1	0	0
18	Marine Pervier	(France) Montpellier	1 February 1990 (aged 18)	3	0	0	0	0
19	Alix Faye Chellali	(France) FCF Lyon	8 August 1988 (aged 20)	1	0	0	0	0
Forwards
7	Charlotte Lozé	(France) Montpellier	11 June 1988 (aged 20)	4	0	0	0	0
9	Marie-Laure Delie	(France) Montpellier	29 January 1988 (aged 20)	4	1	0	0	0
10	Eugénie Le Sommer	(France) Stade Briochin	18 May 1989 (aged 19)	5	4	1	0	0
11	Julie Machart	(France) Gravelines	18 April 1989 (aged 19)	5	2	0	0	0
20	Fanny Tenret	(France) Toulouse	11 March 1990 (aged 18)	0	0	0	0	0
Coach
	(France) Stephane Pilard

=== United States ===
Head coach: Tony DiCicco

#	Name	Club	Date of Birth (Age)	Pld	Goal	Booked	(yellow card) (yellow-red card)	Sent off (straight red)
Goalkeepers
1	Alyssa Naeher	(United States) Penn State Nittany Lions	20 April 1988 (aged 20)	5	0	0	0	0
18	Chantel Jones	(United States) Virginia Cavaliers	20 July 1988 (aged 20)	1	0	0	0	0
21	Cat Parkhill	(United States) Minnesota Golden Gophers	27 May 1990 (aged 18)	0	0	0	0	0
Defenders
2	Kaley Fountain	(United States) Wake Forest Demon Deacons	1 July 1988 (aged 20)	2	0	0	0	0
3	Meghan Klingenberg	(United States) North Carolina Tar Heels	8 February 1988 (aged 20)	5	0	1	0	0
4	Liz Harkin	(United States) Arizona State Sun Devils	28 March 1988 (aged 20)	0	0	0	0	0
5	Kiersten Dallstream	(United States) Washington State Cougars	5 March 1988 (aged 20)	3	0	0	0	0
6	Elli Reed	(United States) Portland Pilots	10 August 1989 (aged 19)	6	0	1	0	0
15	Lauren Fowlkes	(United States) Notre Dame Fighting Irish	7 June 1988 (aged 20)	6	0	0	0	0
17	Nikki Marshall	(United States) Colorado Buffaloes	2 June 1988 (aged 20)	6	0	0	0	0
Midfielders
8	Becky Edwards	(United States) Florida State Seminoles	22 May 1988 (aged 20)	5	1	1	0	0
9	Gina DiMartino	(United States) Boston College Eagles	31 July 1988 (aged 20)	2	0	0	0	0
11	Christine Nairn	(United States) Penn State Nittany Lions	25 September 1990 (aged 18)	6	0	0	0	0
12	Ingrid Wells	(United States) Georgetown Hoyas	29 March 1989 (aged 19)	5	0	0	0	0
14	Keelin Winters	(United States) Portland Pilots	9 December 1988 (aged 19)	6	1	1	0	0
Forwards
7	Alyssa Mautz	(United States) Texas A&M Aggies	29 July 1989 (aged 19)	1	0	0	0	0
10	Michelle Enyeart	(United States) Portland Pilots	26 July 1988 (aged 20)	6	0	0	0	0
13	Alex Morgan	(United States) California Golden Bears	2 July 1989 (aged 19)	6	4	1	0	0
16	Nikki Washington	(United States) North Carolina Tar Heels	1 August 1988 (aged 20)	5	0	0	0	0
19	Sydney Leroux	(United States) UCLA Bruins	7 May 1990 (aged 18)	6	5	1	0	0

== Group C ==
=== Canada ===
Head coach: Ian Bridge

#	Name	Club	Date of Birth (Age)	Pld	Goal	Booked	(yellow card) (yellow-red card)	Sent off (straight red)
Goalkeepers
1	Erin McNulty	(United States) Florida State Seminoles	19 April 1989 (aged 19)	3	0	0	0	0
18	Justine Bernier	(United States) Alabama Crimson Tide	19 July 1989 (aged 18)	1	0	0	0	0
21	Stephanie Panozzo	(United States) Illinois Fighting Illini	18 May 1990 (aged 17)	0	0	0	0	0
Defenders
3	Shannon Woeller	(United States) Rutgers Scarlet Knights	18 January 1990 (aged 18)	0	0	0	0	0
4	Alexandra Marton	(United States) Penn State Nittany Lions	18 February 1990 (aged 18)	3	0	0	0	0
5	Myriam Bouchard	(United States) VCU Rams	19 March 1989 (aged 18)	0	0	0	0	0
11	Allysha Chapman	(United States) LSU Lady Tigers	19 May 1989 (aged 19)	0	0	0	0	0
20	Rachael Goulding	(United States) Ohio Bobcats	18 May 1988 (aged 20)	0	0	0	0	0
Midfielders
2	Paige Adams	(United States) Wisconsin Badgers	18 May 1990 (aged 17)	1	0	0	0	0
6	Taryne Boudreau	(United States) LSU Lady Tigers	19 July 1989 (aged 19)	1	0	0	0	0
7	Andreanne Gagne	(Canada) Sherbrooke Vert et Or	20 September 1988 (aged 20)	0	0	0	0	0
8	Kaylyn Kyle	(Canada) Saskatchewan Huskies	20 March 1988 (aged 20)	3	0	0	0	0
10	Loredana Riverso	(United States) Purdue Boilermakers	20 September 1988 (aged 19)	3	1	0	0	0
12	Alyssa Lagonia	(Canada) Wilfrid Laurier Golden Hawks	19 September 1989 (aged 18)	2	0	0	0	0
13	Margarita Keimakh	(United States) Wisconsin Badgers	18 September 1990 (aged 17)	0	0	0	0	0
14	Monica Lam-Feist	(United States) Wisconsin Badgers	17 September 1991 (aged 16)	3	2	0	0	0
15	Anoop Josan	(United States) UTEP Lady Miners	20 September 1988 (aged 19)	3	0	0	0	0
17	Chelsea Stewart	(United States) Vanderbilt Commodores	18 September 1990 (aged 17)	3	0	0	0	0
Forwards
9	Julie Armstrong	(United States) Oregon Ducks	29 July 1990 (aged 17)	3	1	0	0	0
16	Jonelle Filigno	(United States) Rutgers Scarlet Knights	18 July 1990 (aged 18)	2	1	0	0	0
19	Karla Schacher	(United States) Rutgers Scarlet Knights	20 February 1988 (aged 20)	3	0	1	0	0

=== DR Congo ===
Coach: Poly Bonghanya

No.	Pos.	Player	Date of birth (age)	Caps	Goals	Club
1	GK	Laurette Kondolo	23 December 1990 (aged 17)			(Congolese Association Football Federation) Grand Hôtel
2	DF	Nicole Bakatupidia	15 September 1988 (aged 20)			(Congolese Association Football Federation) Grand Hôtel
3	DF	Lucie Mengi	15 July 1991 (aged 17)			(Congolese Association Football Federation) Force Terrestre
4	FW	Trésorine Vumongo	11 October 1988 (aged 20)			(Congolese Association Football Federation) Force Terrestre
5	DF	Gizi Kiuvu	5 February 1988 (aged 20)			(Congolese Association Football Federation) Grand Hôtel
6	DF	Nanu Mafuala	22 July 1988 (aged 20)			(Congolese Association Football Federation) Grand Hôtel
7	FW	Oliva Amani	22 August 1988 (aged 20)			(Congolese Association Football Federation) Source de Kivu
8	FW	Charlène Diantessa	23 August 1990 (aged 18)			(Congolese Association Football Federation) Grand Hôtel
9	MF	Annette Nshimire	10 October 1988 (aged 20)			(Congolese Association Football Federation) Source de Kivu
10	FW	Arlette Mafuta	3 September 1988 (aged 20)			(Congolese Association Football Federation) Grand Hôtel
11	DF	Nanouche Lumbu	4 December 1988 (aged 19)			(Congolese Association Football Federation) Force Terrestre
12	MF	Carine Panda	20 February 1990 (aged 18)			(Congolese Association Football Federation) Force Terrestre
13	FW	Caroline Wanjale	12 December 1993 (aged 14)			(Congolese Association Football Federation) Étoile du Matin
14	MF	Odile Kuyangisa	1 January 1989 (aged 19)			(Congolese Association Football Federation) Force Terrestre
15	MF	Christine Bongo	24 July 1988 (aged 20)			(Congolese Association Football Federation) Force Terrestre
16	GK	Mamie Buazo	24 December 1988 (aged 19)			(Congolese Association Football Federation) Grand Hôtel
17	FW	Ivonne Malembo	9 April 1989 (aged 19)			(Congolese Association Football Federation) Grand Hôtel
18	DF	Gladdy Shito	12 December 1993 (aged 14)			(Congolese Association Football Federation) Source de Kivu
19	MF	Ma-Vicky Kutoma	2 March 1993 (aged 15)			(Congolese Association Football Federation) Renaissance
20	GK	Fideline Ngoy	31 March 1991 (aged 17)			(Congolese Association Football Federation) Trinita
21	FW	Jeanne D'Arc Neema	6 May 1988 (aged 20)			(Congolese Association Football Federation) Source de Kivu

=== Germany ===
Head coach: Maren Meinert

No.	Pos.	Player	Date of birth (age)	Caps	Goals	Club
1	GK	Alisa Vetterlein	22 October 1988 (aged 20)			(German Football Association) FFC Frankfurt
2	DF	Monique Kerschowski	22 January 1988 (aged 20)			(German Football Association) FFC Turbine Potsdam
3	DF	Katharina Baunach	18 January 1989 (aged 19)			(German Football Association) Bayern Munich
4	DF	Josephine Henning	8 September 1989 (aged 19)			(German Football Association) 1. FC Saarbrücken
5	DF	Carolin Schiewe (captain)	23 October 1988 (aged 20)			(German Football Association) FFC Turbine Potsdam
6	MF	Kim Kulig	9 April 1990 (aged 18)			(German Football Association) Hamburger SV
7	FW	Bianca Schmidt	23 January 1990 (aged 18)			(German Football Association) FFC Turbine Potsdam
8	MF	Nathalie Bock	21 October 1988 (aged 20)			(German Football Association) VfL Wolfsburg
9	FW	Isabel Kerschowski	22 January 1988 (aged 20)			(German Football Association) Turbine Potsdam
10	MF	Nadine Keßler	4 April 1988 (aged 20)			(German Football Association) 1. FC Saarbrücken
11	FW	Nicole Banecki	3 September 1988 (aged 20)			(German Football Association) Bayern Munich
12	GK	Desiree Schumann	6 February 1990 (aged 18)			(German Football Association) Turbine Potsdam
13	FW	Lisa Schwab	30 May 1989 (aged 19)			(German Football Association) 1. FC Saarbrücken
14	DF	Verena Faißt	22 May 1989 (aged 19)			(German Football Association) SC Freiburg
15	FW	Julia Simic	14 May 1989 (aged 19)			(German Football Association) Bayern Munich
16	FW	Sylvie Banecki	3 September 1988 (aged 20)			(German Football Association) Bayern Munich
17	MF	Marina Hegering	17 April 1990 (aged 18)			(German Football Association) FCR Duisburg
18	FW	Stephanie Goddard	15 February 1988 (aged 20)			(German Football Association) FCR Duisburg
19	DF	Stefanie Mirlach	18 April 1990 (aged 18)			(German Football Association) Bayern Munich
20	FW	Marie Pollmann	13 September 1989 (aged 19)			(German Football Association) Herforder SV
21	GK	Jana Burmeister	6 March 1989 (aged 19)			(German Football Association) FC Carl Zeiss Jena

=== Japan ===
The squad was announced on 30 October 2008.

Coach: Norio Sasaki

No.	Pos.	Player	Date of birth (age)	Caps	Goals	Club
1	GK	Shiori Kobayashi	20 May 1988 (aged 20)			(Japan Football Association) NTV Beleza
2	DF	Midori Isokane	29 October 1988 (aged 20)			(Japan Football Association) Kibi International University
3	DF	Saki Kumagai	17 October 1990 (aged 18)			(Japan Football Association) Tokiwagi Gakuen H.S.
4	MF	Rumi Utsugi (captain)	5 December 1988 (aged 19)			(Japan Football Association) NTV Beleza
5	DF	Misaki Kobayashi	21 August 1990 (aged 18)			(Japan Football Association) NTV Menina
6	MF	Asuna Tanaka	23 April 1988 (aged 20)			(Japan Football Association) Tasaki Perule F.C.
7	FW	Asano Nagasato	24 January 1989 (aged 19)			(Japan Football Association) NTV Beleza
8	MF	Mari Kawamura	19 December 1988 (aged 19)			(Japan Football Association) Fukuoka J. Anclas
9	MF	Konomi Ataeyama	22 March 1989 (aged 19)			(Japan Football Association) Albirex Niigata Ladies
10	MF	Natsuko Hara	1 March 1989 (aged 19)			(Japan Football Association) NTV Beleza
11	FW	Michi Goto	27 July 1990 (aged 18)			(Japan Football Association) Tokiwagi Gakuen H.S.
12	GK	Misa Sugawara	25 May 1988 (aged 20)			(Japan Football Association) Kibi International University
13	FW	Hikari Nakade	6 December 1988 (aged 19)			(Japan Football Association) Kibi International University
14	DF	Naoko Sakuramoto	24 September 1990 (aged 18)			(Japan Football Association) Tokiwagi Gakuen H.S.
15	DF	Rina Yanai	20 April 1989 (aged 19)			(Japan Football Association) INAC Kobe Leonessa
16	DF	Kana Osafune	16 October 1989 (aged 19)			(Japan Football Association) TEPCO Mareeze
17	MF	Saori Arimachi	12 July 1988 (aged 20)			(Japan Football Association) Okayama Yunogo Belle
18	MF	Kie Koyama	13 October 1988 (aged 20)			(Japan Football Association) Waseda University
19	FW	Yuki Sakai	10 January 1989 (aged 19)			(Japan Football Association) Tasaki Perule F.C.
20	MF	Yuka Kado	19 June 1990 (aged 18)			(Japan Football Association) Okayama Yunogo Belle
21	GK	Erina Yamane	20 December 1990 (aged 17)			(Japan Football Association) JFA Academy Fukushima

== Group D ==
=== Brazil ===
Head coach: Kleiton Lima

No.	Pos.	Player	Date of birth (age)	Caps	Goals	Club
1	GK	Viviane	15 September 1989 (aged 19)			(Brazilian Football Confederation) Corinthians
2	DF	Joyce	27 May 1988 (aged 20)			(Brazilian Football Confederation) Palmeiras
3	MF	Ketlen	7 January 1992 (aged 16)			(Brazilian Football Confederation) Santos
4	DF	Calandrini	8 March 1988 (aged 20)			(Brazilian Football Confederation) Santos
5	DF	Janaína	2 April 1988 (aged 20)			(Brazilian Football Confederation) Santos
6	DF	Leah	13 December 1990 (aged 17)			(United States Soccer Federation) Team Chicago
7	MF	Adriane	20 July 1988 (aged 20)			(Brazilian Football Confederation) Franca
8	MF	Stephane	4 April 1988 (aged 20)			(Brazilian Football Confederation) Sao Bernardo
9	FW	Érika (captain)	4 February 1988 (aged 20)			(Brazilian Football Confederation) Santos
10	MF	Francielle	18 October 1989 (aged 19)			(Brazilian Football Confederation) Santos
11	MF	Daiane	13 March 1988 (aged 20)			(Brazilian Football Confederation) Uniao Sao Jose
12	GK	Rubiana	17 January 1988 (aged 20)			(Brazilian Football Confederation) Santos
13	DF	Estergiane	9 July 1990 (aged 18)			(Brazilian Football Confederation) Juventude
14	DF	Rafaela	18 August 1988 (aged 20)			(Brazilian Football Confederation) Botucatu
15	DF	Gislaine	22 August 1988 (aged 20)			(Brazilian Football Confederation) Uniao Sao Jose
16	DF	Paula	14 February 1988 (aged 20)			(Brazilian Football Confederation) Corinthians
17	FW	Joseane	1 June 1988 (aged 20)			(Brazilian Football Confederation) Saad
18	MF	Camila	21 August 1990 (aged 18)			(Brazilian Football Confederation) CEPE Caxias
19	FW	Pamela	3 September 1989 (aged 19)			(Brazilian Football Confederation) Campo Grande
20	FW	Karen	27 September 1989 (aged 19)			(Brazilian Football Confederation) AJA Jaguariúna
21	GK	Ana Paula	17 August 1990 (aged 18)			(Brazilian Football Confederation) Jabora

=== North Korea ===
Head coach: Choe Kwang Sok

No.	Pos.	Player	Date of birth (age)	Caps	Goals	Club
1	GK	Kim Un-ju	21 September 1988 (aged 20)			(DPR Korea Football Association) Pyongyang
2	MF	Kim Hyon-sim	27 July 1990 (aged 18)			(DPR Korea Football Association) Pyongyang
3	DF	Pak Kuk-hui	22 April 1988 (aged 20)			(DPR Korea Football Association) Wolmido
4	FW	Kim Hyang-mi	19 October 1991 (aged 17)			(DPR Korea Football Association) Kaesong
5	DF	Yun Song-mi	28 January 1992 (aged 16)			(DPR Korea Football Association) Pyongyang
6	MF	Kim Chun-hui	20 April 1989 (aged 19)			(DPR Korea Football Association) Rimyongsu
7	MF	Ri Ye-gyong	26 October 1989 (aged 19)			(DPR Korea Football Association) Amrokgang
8	MF	Kim Chol-mi	24 March 1989 (aged 19)			(DPR Korea Football Association) Pyongyang
9	MF	Choe Un-ju	23 January 1991 (aged 17)			(DPR Korea Football Association) Pyongyang
10	FW	Ri Hyon-suk	20 July 1989 (aged 19)			(DPR Korea Football Association) Rimyongsu
11	FW	Ra Un-sim (captain)	2 July 1988 (aged 20)			(DPR Korea Football Association) Amrokgang
12	MF	Ri Jong-sim	20 November 1988 (aged 19)			(DPR Korea Football Association) Amrokgang
13	MF	Ri Un-hye	3 November 1988 (aged 20)			(DPR Korea Football Association) April 25 Sports Group
14	MF	Hwang Song-mi	23 March 1988 (aged 20)			(DPR Korea Football Association) Amrokgang
15	MF	Ryom Su-ok	27 March 1988 (aged 20)			(DPR Korea Football Association) Amrokgang
16	DF	Sin Sol-ryon	29 September 1990 (aged 18)			(DPR Korea Football Association) Amrokgang
17	DF	Ri Un-hyang	15 May 1988 (aged 20)			(DPR Korea Football Association) Amrokgang
18	GK	Thak Un-mi	12 August 1991 (aged 17)			(DPR Korea Football Association) Rimyongsu
19	DF	Choe Yong-sim	13 October 1988 (aged 20)			(DPR Korea Football Association) Pyongyang
20	FW	Cha Hu-nam	2 March 1989 (aged 19)			(DPR Korea Football Association) Amrokgang
21	GK	Choe Hyo-sun	1 July 1989 (aged 19)			(DPR Korea Football Association) April 25 Sports Group

=== Mexico ===
Head coach: Andrea Rodebaugh

No.	Pos.	Player	Date of birth (age)	Caps	Goals	Club
1	GK	Erika Vanegas	7 July 1988 (aged 20)			(Mexican Football Federation) Jalisco
2	DF	Wendoline Ortiz	14 August 1989 (aged 19)			(Mexican Football Federation) Universidad de Colima
3	DF	Aidee Ramírez	1 January 1988 (aged 20)			(Mexican Football Federation) Estrellas Mexico
4	DF	Ana Gómez	24 July 1988 (aged 20)			(Mexican Football Federation) Macro Soccer
5	MF	Janet Méndez	24 August 1988 (aged 20)			(United States Soccer Federation) Long Beach State Beach
6	MF	Liliana Mercado (captain)	22 October 1988 (aged 20)			(Mexican Football Federation) Andrea's Soccer
7	MF	Yalu Mondragón (captain)	18 March 1990 (aged 18)			(Mexican Football Federation) Dragonas Oriente
8	FW	Alejandra Torres	29 September 1989 (aged 19)			(Mexican Football Federation) Laguna
9	FW	Charlyn Corral	11 September 1991 (aged 17)			(Mexican Football Federation) Andrea's Soccer
10	FW	Dinora Garza	24 January 1988 (aged 20)			(Mexican Football Federation) Tigres
11	FW	Stephany Mayor	23 September 1991 (aged 17)			(Mexican Football Federation) Laguna
12	GK	Wendy Espejel	3 July 1990 (aged 18)			(United States Soccer Federation) Point Loma Sea Lions
13	DF	Susana Mendoza	24 January 1988 (aged 20)			(Mexican Football Federation) Universidad de Colima
14	DF	Valeria Hernández	22 August 1990 (aged 18)			(Mexican Football Federation) Laguna
15	MF	Nayeli Rangel	28 February 1992 (aged 16)			(Mexican Football Federation) ITESM Monterrey
16	FW	Rosaura Gallegos	2 July 1990 (aged 18)			(Mexican Football Federation) Andrea's Soccer
17	MF	Liliana Godoy	21 June 1990 (aged 18)			(Mexican Football Federation) Cruz Azul
18	FW	Claudia García	19 July 1988 (aged 20)			(Mexican Football Federation) Aztecas
19	FW	Alina Garciamendez	16 April 1991 (aged 17)			(United States Soccer Federation) Dallas Texans
20	GK	Cecilia Santiago	19 October 1994 (aged 14)			(Mexican Football Federation) Laguna
21	FW	Inglis Hernández	17 September 1990 (aged 18)			(Mexican Football Federation) Stars Soccer Tijuana

=== Norway ===
Head coach: Jarl Torske

No.	Pos.	Player	Date of birth (age)	Caps	Goals	Club
1	GK	Runa Barli	20 January 1988 (aged 20)			(Norwegian Football Federation) Trondheims-Ørn SK
2	DF	Astrid Grøttå Ree	22 September 1989 (aged 19)			(Norwegian Football Federation) Klepp
3	DF	Caroline Walde	6 February 1989 (aged 19)			(Norwegian Football Federation) Arna-Bjørnar
4	DF	Marita Skammelsrud Lund	29 January 1989 (aged 19)			(Norwegian Football Federation) Team Strømmen
5	DF	Gunhild Herregarden	26 January 1989 (aged 19)			(Norwegian Football Federation) Røa
6	MF	Ingrid Moe Wold	29 January 1990 (aged 18)			(Norwegian Football Federation) Gjøvik FK
7	MF	Maren Mjelde	6 November 1989 (aged 19)			(Norwegian Football Federation) Arna-Bjørnar
8	MF	Isabell Herlovsen	23 June 1988 (aged 20)			(Norwegian Football Federation) Kolbotn
9	FW	Ingvild Isaksen	10 February 1989 (aged 19)			(Norwegian Football Federation) Kolbotn
10	FW	Ida Elise Enget	14 June 1989 (aged 19)			(Norwegian Football Federation) Team Strømmen
11	FW	Elise Thorsnes	14 August 1988 (aged 20)			(Norwegian Football Federation) Arna-Bjørnar
12	GK	Ingrid Thorbjornsen	27 March 1990 (aged 18)			(Norwegian Football Federation) Medkila
13	FW	Marita Eide	15 March 1990 (aged 18)			(Norwegian Football Federation) Trondheims-Ørn SK
14	MF	June Tarnes	2 September 1990 (aged 18)			(Norwegian Football Federation) Fløya
15	MF	Tina Wulf	4 May 1988 (aged 20)			(Norwegian Football Federation) Trondheims-Ørn SK
16	MF	Katrine Andersen	3 June 1989 (aged 19)			(Norwegian Football Federation) Kattem
17	DF	Eline Johansen	16 May 1989 (aged 19)			(Norwegian Football Federation) Fløya
18	DF	Ingrid Ryland	29 May 1989 (aged 19)			(Norwegian Football Federation) Arna-Bjørnar
19	FW	Oda Fugelsnes	3 July 1990 (aged 18)			(Norwegian Football Federation) Trondheims-Ørn SK
20	FW	Kristina Hegland	8 August 1992 (aged 16)			(Norwegian Football Federation) Arna-Bjørnar
21	GK	Marthe Kvaale	22 June 1989 (aged 19)			(Norwegian Football Federation) Røa
