= 2006 UEFA Women's Under-19 Championship =

Tournament details
- Host country: Switzerland
- Dates: 11–22 July
- Teams: 8

Final positions
- Champions: Germany (4th title)
- Runners-up: France

Tournament statistics
- Matches played: 15
- Goals scored: 39 (2.6 per match)
- Attendance: 14,773 (985 per match)
- Top scorer(s): (Russia) Elena Danilova (7 goals)
- Best player(s): (Germany) Isabel Kerschowski & (Germany) Monique Kerschowski

The UEFA Women's U-19 Championship 2006 Final Tournament was held in Switzerland between 11 and 22 July 2006. Germany won the cup after defeating France 3–0 in the final match. Players born after 1 January 1987 were eligible to participate in this competition.

== Qualifications ==
There were two separate rounds of qualifications held before the Final Tournament, beginning with the First Qualifying Round. The first 40 teams were drawn into 10 groups. See UEFA Women's U-19 Championship 2006 (First Qualifying Round).

Top two teams from each group and the five best third-placed team entered in a Second Qualifying Round along with Germany, France and Spain who automatically qualified. The 28 teams were drawn into 7 groups. See UEFA Women's U-19 Championship 2006 (Second Qualifying Round).

Then, the winners of each group joint hosts Switzerland at the Final Tournament.

== Final tournament ==
=== Group stage ===
==== Group A ====
Team	Pts	Pld	W	D	L	GF	GA
Germany	7	3	2	1	0	7	1
Denmark	4	3	1	1	1	2	3
Sweden	3	3	0	3	0	1	1
Belgium	1	3	0	1	2	1	6

July 11, 2006
19:00 (CEST)

Germany	1–1	Sweden
Angel 88'	(Report)	Krantz 37'

Stadion Neufeld, Bern
Referee: Teodora Albon (Romania)

July 11, 2006
19:00 (CEST)

Denmark	2–1	Belgium
E. Madsen 42', 67'	(Report)	Elsen 33'

Solothurn Stadium, Solothurn
Referee: Sandra Braz Bastos (Portugal)

July 13, 2006
18:00 (CEST)

Germany	2–0	Denmark
Bajramaj 53' (pen.); Keßler 67'	(Report)

Stadion Rankmatte, Langenthal
Referee: Paloma Quintero Siles (Spain)

July 13, 2006
19:15 (CEST)

Sweden	0–0	Belgium
	(Report)

Stadion Neufeld, Bern
Referee: Rachel Cohen (Israel)

July 16, 2006
18:00 (CEST)

Belgium	0–4	Germany
	(Report)	Engel 42'; Keßler 46'; Blässe 85'; Höfler 90'

Solothurn Stadium, Solothurn
Referee: Kateryna Monzul (Ukraine)

July 16, 2006
18:00 (CEST)

Sweden	0–0	Denmark
	(Report)

Stadion Rankmatte, Langenthal
Referee: Hilal Tuba Tosun Ayer (Turkey)

==== Group B ====
Team	Pts	Pld	W	D	L	GF	GA
France	9	3	3	0	0	8	1
Russia	6	3	2	0	1	8	6
Switzerland	3	3	1	0	2	3	5
Netherlands	0	3	0	0	3	1	8

July 11, 2006
19:00 (CEST)

Russia	1–4	France
Danilova 40' (pen.)	(Report)	Delie 12', 66'; Coton Pélagie 19'; Le Sommer 90'

Stadion Breite, Schaffhausen
Referee: Hilal Tuba Tosun Ayer (Turkey)

July 11, 2006
19:00 (CEST)

Switzerland	2–0	Netherlands
Sarrasin 63'; Meyer 75'	(Report)

Stadion Schützenwiese, Winterthur
Referee: Kateryna Monzul (Ukraine)

July 13, 2006
19:00 (CEST)

Netherlands	0–1	France
	(Report)	Delie 39'

Stadion Bergholz, Wil
Referee: Sandra Braz Bastos (Portugal)

July 13, 2006
19:00 (CEST)

Switzerland	1–2	Russia
Abbé 1'	(Report)	Danilova 50', 59'

Stadion Breite, Schaffhausen
Referee: Teodora Albon (Romania)

July 16, 2006
19:00 (CEST)

France	3–0	Switzerland
Houara 66'; Mazaloubeaud 12'; Delie 90'	(Report)

Stadion Bergholz, Wil
Referee: Paloma Quintero Siles (Spain)

July 16, 2006
19:00 (CEST)

Netherlands	1–5	Russia
van der Heijde 8'	(Report)	Danilova 18', 28', 53', 68'; Terekhova 84'

Stadion Schützenwiese, Winterthur
Referee: Rachel Cohen (Israel)

=== Knockout stage ===
Semi-finals
Germany	4
Russia	0
France	1
Denmark	0

Final
Germany	3
France	0

==== Semifinals ====
July 19, 2006
18:00 (CEST)

Germany	4–0	Russia
Angel 47'; M. Kerschowski 50'; Maier 53'; I. Kerschowski 72'	(Report)

Stadion Neufeld, Bern
Referee: Teodora Albon (Romania)

July 19, 2006
19:00 (CEST)

France	1–0	Denmark
Delie 71'	(Report)

Solothurn Stadium, Solothurn
Referee: Hilal Tuba Tosun Ayer (Turkey)

==== Final ====
July 22, 2006
19:30 (CEST)

Germany	3–0	France
I. Kerschowski 13', 53'; M. Kerschowski 75'	(Report)

Stadion Neufeld, Bern
Referee: Paloma Quintero Siles (Spain)

== Goalscorers ==
7 goals

- (Russia) Elena Danilova

5 goals

- (France) Marie-Laure Delie

3 goals

- (Germany) Isabel Kerschowski

2 goals

- (Denmark) Emma Madsen
- (Germany) Ann-Christin Angel
- (Germany) Nadine Keßler
- (Germany) Monique Kerschowski

1 goal

- (Belgium) Kristien Elsen
- (France) Nora Coton Pélagie
- (France) Jessica Houara
- (France) Eugénie Le Sommer
- (France) Chloé Mazaloubeaud
- (Germany) Fatmire Bajramaj
- (Germany) Anna Blässe
- (Germany) Friederike Engel
- (Germany) Juliane Höfler
- (Germany) Juliane Maier
- (Netherlands) Amber van der Heijde
- (Russia) Elena Terekhova
- (Sweden) Maja Krantz
- (Switzerland) Caroline Abbé
- (Switzerland) Isabelle Meyer
- (Switzerland) Maeva Sarrasin
