= 2008 FIFA U-20 Women's World Cup =

4th edition of the FIFA U-20 Women's World Cup

FIFA U-20 Women's World Cup Chile 2008 Copa Mundial Femenina de Fútbol Sub-20 de 2008
- Official logo

Tournament details
- Host country: Chile
- Dates: 19 November – 7 December
- Teams: 16 (from 6 confederations)
- Venue: 4 (in 4 host cities)

Final positions
- Champions: United States (2nd title)
- Runners-up: North Korea
- Third place: Germany
- Fourth place: France

Tournament statistics
- Matches played: 32
- Goals scored: 113 (3.53 per match)
- Attendance: 252,358 (7,886 per match)
- Top scorer(s): (United States) Sydney Leroux (5 goals)
- Best player: (United States) Sydney Leroux
- Best goalkeeper: (United States) Alyssa Naeher
- Fair play award: United States

The 2008 FIFA U-20 Women's World Cup was the 4th edition of the tournament. It was held in Chile between 19 November and 7 December 2008. Sixteen teams, comprising representatives from all six confederations, took part in the final competition, in which Chile had a guaranteed place as the host nation.

== Background ==
On 15 September 2006, FIFA officially announced Chile as the host country. It was the third time Chile organized a football world cup, after the 1962 FIFA World Cup and the 1987 FIFA World Youth Championship, but the first in the women's competition. The decision came as a surprise to Chile, as it had bid in August 2006 to host the 2008 FIFA U-17 Women's World Cup, which was finally granted to New Zealand (Ecuador was unsuccessful in both bids). Chile previously hosted the South American Under-20 Women's Football Championship and the first edition for Under 17s in January 2008.

== Venues ==
Four different cities were selected as venues in an open bidding process. Changes to the stadiums to comply with FIFA standards were carried out between December 2007 and September 2008. The selected venues were:

- Francisco Sánchez Rumoroso World Cup Stadium, Coquimbo (opening)
- La Florida Bicentennial Municipal Stadium, La Florida (Greater Santiago area)
- Nelson Oyarzún Arenas Chillán Municipal Stadium, Chillán
- Germán Becker B. Municipal Stadium, Temuco

Coquimbo	2008 FIFA U-20 Women's World Cup is located in Chile	La Florida (Greater Santiago area)
Francisco Sánchez Rumoroso Stadium	2008 FIFA U-20 Women's World Cup is located in Chile	La Florida Bicentennial Stadium
Capacity: 18,750	2008 FIFA U-20 Women's World Cup is located in Chile	Capacity: 12,000
Chillán	2008 FIFA U-20 Women's World Cup is located in Chile	Temuco
Nelson Oyarzún Stadium	2008 FIFA U-20 Women's World Cup is located in Chile	Germán Becker Stadium
Capacity: 12,000	2008 FIFA U-20 Women's World Cup is located in Chile	Capacity: 18,125

== Qualified teams ==
The places were allocated as follows to confederations: AFC (3), CAF (2), CONCACAF (3), CONMEBOL (2), OFC (1), UEFA (4), plus the host country.

Continent	Confederation Qualifying Tournament	Qualifier(s)
Asia	2007 AFC U-19 Women's Championship	North Korea; Japan; China
Africa	2008 African U-20 Women's World Cup Qualifying Tournament	Nigeria; DR Congo
Central, North America and Caribbean	2008 CONCACAF Women's U-20 Championship	Canada; United States; Mexico
South America	Host nation	Chile^{1}
South America	2008 South American Under-20 Women's Football Championship	Brazil; Argentina
Oceania	appointed by OFC, no qualifying tournament	New Zealand
Europe	2007 UEFA Women's Under-19 Championship	Germany; England; France; Norway^{1}

1. Teams that made their debut.

== Group stage ==
The opening phase of the tournament comprised four groups of four teams, with the top two sides in each section advancing to the quarter-finals. The final draw to determine the groups took place in Santiago, Chile on 13 September 2008 at 20:30 UTC.

All times local (UTC-3)

=== Group A ===
Team	Pld	W	D	L	GF	GA	GD	Pts
Nigeria	3	2	1	0	6	3	+3	7
England	3	1	2	0	4	2	+2	5
New Zealand	3	1	1	1	7	7	0	4
Chile	3	0	0	3	3	8	−5	0

2008-11-19
15:00

New Zealand	2–3	Nigeria
Percival 42' 52'	(Report)	S. Michael 31'; Chukwudi 35'; Chikwelu 90+2'

Francisco Sánchez Rumoroso Stadium, Coquimbo
Referee: (Austria) Tanja Schett

2008-11-19
21:00

Chile	0–2	England
	(Report)	Chaplen 54'; Duggan 79'

Francisco Sánchez Rumoroso Stadium, Coquimbo
Attendance: 15,045
Referee: (United States) Jennifer Bennett

2008-11-22
18:00

Nigeria	1–1	England
Orji 71'	(Report)	Dowie 45+1'

Francisco Sánchez Rumoroso Stadium, Coquimbo
Referee: (Canada) Carol Anne Chenard

2008-11-22
21:00

Chile	3–4	New Zealand
Mardones 50'; Pardo 83'; Zamora 90+2'	(Report)	White 20' 36' (pen.) 74'; Leota 66'

Francisco Sánchez Rumoroso Stadium, Coquimbo
Attendance: 16,324
Referee: (Costa Rica) Érika Vargas

2008-11-26
19:00

Nigeria	2–0	Chile
Guajardo 15' (o.g.); Orji 41'	(Report)

Germán Becker Stadium, Temuco
Attendance: 18,125
Referee: (Germany) Bibiana Steinhaus

2008-11-26
19:00

England	1–1	New Zealand
Duggan 90+4'	(Report)	McLaughlin 27'

La Florida Stadium, La Florida
Attendance: 8,661
Referee: (Japan) Sachiko Baba

=== Group B ===
Team	Pld	W	D	L	GF	GA	GD	Pts
United States	3	2	0	1	6	2	+4	6
France	3	2	0	1	5	4	+1	6
China	3	1	1	1	2	2	0	4
Argentina	3	0	1	2	1	6	−5	1

2008-11-19
12:00

China	0–0	Argentina
	(Report)

Nelson Oyarzún Arenas Stadium, Chillán
Attendance: 3,500
Referee: (Hungary) Gyoengyi Gaal

2008-11-19
15:00

France	0–3	United States
	(Report)	Morgan 53'; Leroux 56' 71'

Nelson Oyarzún Arenas Stadium, Chillán
Attendance: 4,300
Referee: (Australia) Jacqui Melksham

2008-11-22
12:00

United States	3–0	Argentina
Edwards 11'; Morgan 53' 90'	(Report)

Nelson Oyarzún Arenas Stadium, Chillán
Referee: (Romania) Cristina Ionescu

2008-11-22
15:00

China	0–2	France
	(Report)	Delie 70'; Le Sommer 87'

Nelson Oyarzún Arenas Stadium, Chillán
Attendance: 7,590
Referee: (Guinea) Therese Sagno

2008-11-26
16:00

United States	0–2	China
	(Report)	Zhang 52'; Liu 58'

Germán Becker Stadium, Temuco
Referee: (Austria) Tanja Schett

2008-11-26
16:00

Argentina	1–3	France
Jaimes 42'	(Report)	Le Sommer 65' 80'; Machart 90+3'

La Florida Stadium, La Florida
Referee: (Canada) Carol Anne Chenard

=== Group C ===
Team	Pld	W	D	L	GF	GA	GD	Pts
Japan	3	3	0	0	7	2	+5	9
Germany	3	2	0	1	8	3	+5	6
Canada	3	1	0	2	5	4	+1	3
DR Congo	3	0	0	3	1	12	−11	0

2008-11-20
16:00

Canada	0–2	Japan
	(Report)	Goto 28'; Tanaka 40'

La Florida Stadium, La Florida
Referee: (England) Alexandra Ihringova

2008-11-20
19:00

DR Congo	0–5	Germany
	(Report)	Kulig 7', 90+1'; Baunach 8'; Kerschowski 43' (pen.); N. Banecki 82'

La Florida Stadium, La Florida
Attendance: 3,478
Referee: (Uruguay) Gabriela Bandeira

2008-11-23
18:00

Germany	1–2	Japan
Kerschowski 61'	(Report)	Koyama 41'; Nagasato 83'

La Florida Stadium, La Florida
Referee: (India) Bentla D Coth

2008-11-23
21:00

Canada	4–0	DR Congo
Riverso 1'; Lam-Feist 40'; Filigno 77'; Armstrong 90'	(Report)

La Florida Stadium, La Florida
Attendance: 7,482
Referee: (Hungary) Gyoengyi Gaal

2008-11-27
19:00

Germany	2–1	Canada
McNulty 77' (o.g.); Schwab 90'	(Report)	Lam-Feist 81'

Francisco Sánchez Rumoroso Stadium, Coquimbo
Attendance: 14,048
Referee: (Australia) Jacqui Melksham

2008-11-27
19:00

Japan	3–1	DR Congo
Mafuala 4' (o.g.); Ataeyama 10'; Utsugi 78'	(Report)	Amani 6'

Nelson Oyarzún Arenas Stadium, Chillán
Attendance: 6,200
Referee: (Romania) Cristina Ionescu

=== Group D ===
Team	Pld	W	D	L	GF	GA	GD	Pts
Brazil	3	3	0	0	11	2	+9	9
North Korea	3	2	0	1	10	6	+4	6
Norway	3	1	0	2	4	7	−3	3
Mexico	3	0	0	3	2	12	−10	0

2008-11-20
16:00

Mexico	1–2	Norway
Garza 28'	(Report)	Lund 26'; Enget 76'

Germán Becker Stadium, Temuco
Referee: (Japan) Sachiko Baba

2008-11-20
19:00

Brazil	3–2	North Korea
Janaína 45+2'; Érika 48'; Francielle 66' (pen.)	(Report)	Ri Y.G. 30'; Ri U.H. 90'

Germán Becker Stadium, Temuco
Attendance: 12,500
Referee: (Germany) Bibiana Steinhaus

2008-11-23
12:00

North Korea	3–2	Norway
Ri Y.G. 17'; Ra 29' 64'	(Report)	Herlovsen 52' 59'

Germán Becker Stadium, Temuco
Referee: (United States) Jennifer Bennett

2008-11-23
15:00

Mexico	0–5	Brazil
	(Report)	Pamela 4'; Francielle 40'; Daiane 68'; Ketlen 90+4'; Ortiz 90+5' (o.g.)

Germán Becker Stadium, Temuco
Attendance: 13,080
Referee: (England) Alexandra Ihringova

2008-11-27
16:00

North Korea	5–1	Mexico
Ryom 9'; Pak 17'; Choe 39'; Ri H.S. 53'; Ri Y.G. 66'	(Report)	Corral 84'

Nelson Oyarzún Arenas Stadium, Chillán
Referee: (Chile) Carolina González

2008-11-27
16:00

Norway	0–3	Brazil
	(Report)	Érika 39'; Daiane 80'; Pamela 83'

Francisco Sánchez Rumoroso Stadium, Coquimbo
Referee: (Costa Rica) Érika Vargas

== Knockout stage ==
All times local (UTC-3)

=== Knockout map ===
Quarter-finals
30 November – Coquimbo
Nigeria	2
France	3
1 December – La Florida
Japan	1
North Korea	2
30 November – Chillán
United States	3
England	0
1 December – Temuco
Brazil	2
Germany	3

Semi-finals
4 December – Temuco
France	1
North Korea	2
4 December – Coquimbo
United States	1
Germany	0

Final
7 December – La Florida
North Korea	1
United States	2
Third place
7 December – La Florida
France	3
Germany	5

=== Quarterfinals ===
2008-11-30
16:00

Nigeria	2–3	France
Orji 13'; Jegede 38'	(Report)	Machart 2'; Le Sommer 49'; Coton-Pélagie 88'

Francisco Sánchez Rumoroso Stadium, Coquimbo
Attendance: 12,363
Referee: (United States) Jennifer Bennett

2008-11-30
19:00

United States	3–0	England
Winters 53'; Leroux 81' 90+4'	(Report)

Nelson Oyarzún Arenas Stadium, Chillán
Attendance: 11,080
Referee: (Australia) Jacqui Melksham

2008-12-01
16:00

Japan	1–2	North Korea
Nagasato 39'	(Report)	Cha 22'; Ra 60'

La Florida Stadium, La Florida
Attendance: 8,614
Referee: (Austria) Tanja Schett

2008-12-01
19:00

Brazil	2–3	Germany
Schiewe 38' (o.g.); Adriane 88'	(Report)	S. Banecki 44'; Bock 68'; N. Banecki 82'

Germán Becker Stadium, Temuco
Attendance: 12,854
Referee: (Canada) Carol Anne Chenard

=== Semifinals ===
2008-12-04
16:00

France	1–2	North Korea
Coton-Pélagie 51'	(Report)	Ri U.H. 68'; Ri Y.G. 90+3'

Germán Becker Stadium, Temuco
Attendance: 13,184
Referee: (Canada) Carol Anne Chenard

2008-12-04
19:00

United States	1–0	Germany
Schmidt 21' (o.g.)	(Report)

Francisco Sánchez Rumoroso Stadium, Coquimbo
Attendance: 15,548
Referee: (Japan) Sachiko Baba

=== 3rd-place playoff ===
2008-12-07
15:30

France	3–5	Germany
Pervier 45+1' 75'; Delie 90+2'	(Report)	Pollman 10' 29' 31'; Simic 67'; Schwab 80'

La Florida Stadium, La Florida
Referee: (United States) Jennifer Bennett

=== Final ===
2008-12-07
18:30

North Korea	1–2	United States
Cha 90+2'	(Report)	Leroux 23'; Morgan 42'

La Florida Stadium, La Florida
Attendance: 12,000
Referee: (England) Alexandra Ihringova

2008 FIFA U-20 Women's World Cup winners

United States
Second title

== Awards ==
The following awards were given for the tournament:

Golden Ball	Silver Ball	Bronze Ball
(United States) Sydney Leroux	(United States) Alex Morgan	(France) Eugénie Le Sommer
Golden Shoe	Silver Shoe	Bronze Shoe
(United States) Sydney Leroux	(North Korea) Ri Ye-gyong	(United States) Alex Morgan
5 goals	4 goals	4 goals
Golden Glove
(United States) Alyssa Naeher
FIFA Fair Play Award
United States

=== All star team ===
The following players were named as the All Star Team for the tournament:

Goalkeepers	Defenders	Midfielders	Forwards
(Chile) Christiane Endler (United States) Alyssa Naeher	(North Korea) Pak Kuk-hui (France) Wendie Renard (Germany) Bianca Schmidt (Germany) Katharina Baunach (Norway) Ingrid Ryland	(Japan) Natsuko Hara (Germany) Nicole Banecki (North Korea) Ri Ye-gyong (Germany) Kim Kulig (England) Toni Duggan (United States) Keelin Winters	(Brazil) Érika (France) Marie-Laure Delie (Japan) Asano Nagasato (United States) Sydney Leroux (North Korea) Ra Un-sim (France) Eugénie Le Sommer (United States) Alex Morgan

== Goalscorers ==
5 goals

- (United States) Sydney Leroux

4 goals

- (France) Eugenie Le Sommer
- (North Korea) Ri Ye-gyong
- (United States) Alex Morgan

3 goals

- (Germany) Marie Pollman
- (Nigeria) Ebere Orji
- (New Zealand) Rosie White
- (North Korea) Ra Un-sim

2 goals

- (Brazil) Daiane
- (Brazil) Érika
- (Brazil) Francielle
- (Brazil) Pamela
- (Canada) Monica Lam-Feist
- (England) Toni Duggan
- (France) Nora Coton-Pélagie
- (France) Marie-Laure Delie
- (France) Julie Machart
- (France) Marine Pervier
- (Germany) Nicole Banecki
- (Germany) Isabel Kerschowski
- (Germany) Kim Kulig
- (Germany) Lisa Schwab
- (Japan) Asano Nagasato
- (Norway) Isabell Herlovsen
- (New Zealand) Ria Percival
- (North Korea) Cha Hu-nam
- (North Korea) Ri Un-hyang

1 goal

- (Argentina) Florencia Jaimes
- (Brazil) Adriane
- (Brazil) Janaína
- (Brazil) Ketlen
- (Canada) Julie Armstrong
- (Canada) Jonelle Filigno
- (Canada) Loredana Riverso
- (Chile) María Mardones
- (Chile) Daniela Pardo
- (Chile) Daniela Zamora
- (China) Liu Shukun
- (China) Zhang Rui
- (Democratic Republic of the Congo) Oliva Amani
- (England) Brooke Chaplen
- (England) Natasha Dowie
- (Germany) Sylvie Banecki
- (Germany) Katharina Baunach
- (Germany) Nathalie Bock
- (Germany) Julia Simic
- (Japan) Konomi Ataeyama
- (Japan) Michi Goto
- (Japan) Kie Koyama
- (Japan) Asuna Tanaka
- (Japan) Rumi Utsugi
- (Mexico) Charlyn Corral
- (Mexico) Dinora Garza
- (Nigeria) Rita Chikwelu
- (Nigeria) Ogonna Chukwudi
- (Nigeria) Joy Jegede
- (Nigeria) Sarah Michael
- (Norway) Ida Elise Enget
- (Norway) Marita Skammelsrud Lund
- (New Zealand) Renee Leota
- (New Zealand) Sarah McLaughlin
- (North Korea) Choe Un-ju
- (North Korea) Pak Kuk-hui
- (North Korea) Ra Un-sim
- (North Korea) Ri Hyon-suk
- (North Korea) Ryom Su-ok
- (United States) Becky Edwards
- (United States) Keelin Winters

Own goals

- (Canada) Erin McNulty (1 for Germany)
- (Chile) Javiera Guajardo (1 for Nigeria)
- (Democratic Republic of the Congo) Nanu Mafuala (1 for Japan)
- (Germany) Carolin Schiewe (1 for Brazil)
- (Germany) Bianca Schmidt (1 for USA)
- (Mexico) Wendoline Ortiz (1 for Brazil)
