= Ogonna =

- Gender: unisex
- Language: Igbo

Origin
- Word/name: Nigeria
- Meaning: a favour done by the father

Ogonna // is a Nigerian unisex given name of Igbo origin that means "the father's favour".

Notable people with the name include:

- Ogonna Nnamani (born 1983), American physician and volleyball player
- Ogonna Chukwudi (born 1988), Nigerian footballer
