= Lisa Schwab =

German footballer

Personal information
- Full name: Lisa Schwab
- Date of birth: 30 May 1989 (age 37)
- Place of birth: Höhfröschen, West Germany
- Height: 1.70 m (5 ft 7 in)
- Position: Striker

Team information
- Current team: Bayer 04 Leverkusen
- Number: 19

Youth career
- –2005: FC Fehrbach

Senior career*
Years	Team	Apps	(Gls)
2005–2009	Saarbrücken	78	(59)
2009–	Bayer Leverkusen	84	(27)

International career^{‡}
2004	Germany U15	4	(0)
2004–2006	Germany U17	19	(6)
2007–2008	Germany U19	11	(1)
2008	Germany U20	6	(3)
2009–2012	Germany U23	6	(1)
- * Club domestic league appearances and goals as of 30 June 2014 ‡ National team caps and goals as of 23 May 2012

Lisa Schwab (born 30 May 1989) is a German football striker, currently playing for Bayer Leverkusen in the Bundesliga. She has also played for 1.FC Saarbrücken. For Saarbrücken, on 13 April 2009, she scored a crucial goal in the 82nd minute against FFC Frankfurt II, which was significant in them being able to achieve a promotion to the Bundesliga in the 2008–09 2. Frauen-Bundesliga. For Leverkusen, Schwab was a first team regular but found her time there to be affected by an injury to a ligament in her left foot.

As an Under-19 international she won the 2007 U-19 European Championship and a bronze medal at the 2008 U-20 World Cup. In the latter tournament, according to the Saarbrücker Zeitung, Schwab was judged to be a key factor in Germany's win over Brazil in the quarter-final.

== Early life ==
Schwab is originally from Höhfröschen and grew up with an older brother called Sebastian. She would follow her brother to training sessions at FC Fehrbach. Her own football potential was recognised by a coach there called Gerhard Lorett after she joined in with the training sessions.
