= Francis Banecki =

German footballer (born 1985)

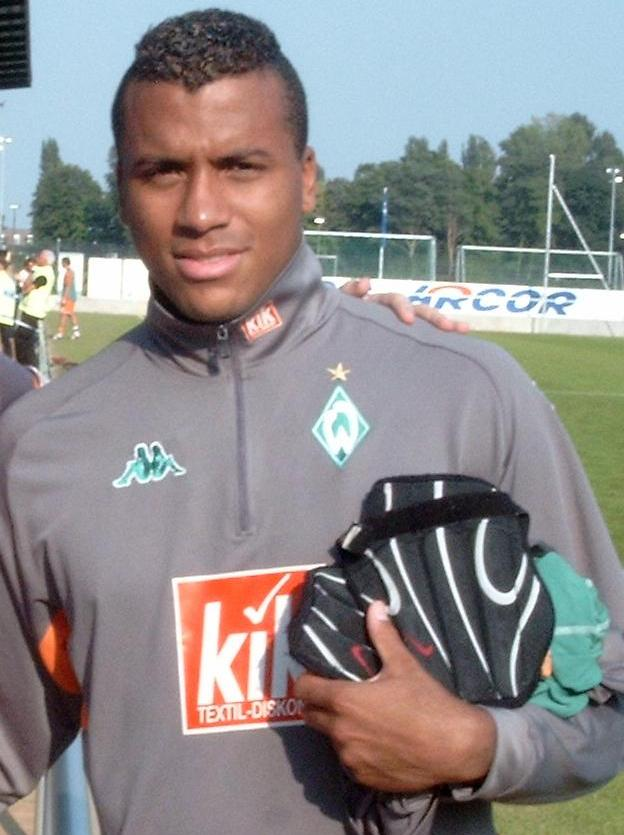
- Banecki with Werder in 2005

Personal information
- Date of birth: 17 July 1985 (age 41)
- Place of birth: West Berlin, West Germany
- Height: 1.92 m (6 ft 4 in)
- Positions: Defender; forward

Youth career
- 1992–1997: SC Tegel
- 1997–1999: Reinickendorfer Füchse
- 1999–2000: Hertha BSC
- 2001: Reinickendorfer Füchse
- 2001–2003: Tennis Borussia Berlin
- 2003–2004: Werder Bremen

Senior career*
Years	Team	Apps	(Gls)
2003–2006	Werder Bremen II	52	(4)
2004–2006	Werder Bremen	2	(0)
2006–2007	→ Eintracht Braunschweig (loan)	9	(0)
2006–2007	→ Eintracht Braunschweig II (loan)	7	(2)
2007–2008	Werder Bremen II	0	(0)
2008–2009	Hertha BSC II	2	(0)
2009–2010	Kickers Emden	13	(3)
2010	FC Oberneuland	6	(1)
2010–2011	SV Meppen	34	(15)
2011–2014	BSV Schwarz-Weiß Rehden	58	(20)
2014–2017	VSG Altglienicke		

International career
2004	Germany U-19	2	(0)
2005–2006	Germany U-20	6	(1)
- * Club domestic league appearances and goals

Francis Banecki (born 17 July 1985) is a German former professional footballer who mostly played as a defender.

== Club career ==
Banecki played for Reinickendorfer Füchse and for Hertha BSC in his youth years.

In 2003–04, he moved to Werder Bremen youth system. After having had a successful 2004–05 season, he moved from Bremen's youth team to the first team in 2005–06.

After the 2006–07 season Banecki was loaned to Eintracht Braunschweig for one year. In Braunschweig he played nine times for the first team until a severe injury in his knee stopped him for over one year.

After the convalescence his contract with Werder Bremen expired, Banecki returned to Hertha BSC to play for the club's second team for the season 2008–09. On 5 August 2009, he left Hertha BSC II for Kickers Emden, but in December 2009 he resigned his contract with the club. He left Emden on 26 December 2009 and signed on 1 January 2010 for FC Oberneuland. In June 2010 he signed a contract with VfB Oldenburg but cancelled it after one month and signed with local rival SV Meppen.

== International career ==
Banecki made six appearances for the Germany under-20 team, scoring one goal, and two appearances for the Germany under-19 team.

== Personal life ==
Banecki's siblings, the twins Nicole and Sylvie also played in the first Bundesliga. His mother's cousin, Marcel Mahouvé, represented Cameroon in the 1998 FIFA World Cup.
