= Yuka Kado =

Japanese footballer

Yuka Kado 加戸 由佳
Personal information
- Full name: Yuka Kado
- Date of birth: June 19, 1990 (age 36)
- Place of birth: Kurashiki, Okayama, Japan
- Height: 1.62 m (5 ft 4 in)
- Position: Midfielder

Team information
- Current team: Bunnys Kyoto SC
- Number: 16

Senior career*
| Years | Team | Apps | (Gls) |
| 2004–2017 | Okayama Yunogo Belle | 200 | (37) |
| 2018– | Bunnys Kyoto SC | 9 | (1) |
| Total | | 209 | (38) |

International career
| 2008–2010 | Japan U-20 | 7 | (0) |
| 2013 | Japan | 3 | (0) |
Medal record
Okayama Yunogo Belle
| Runner-up | Nadeshiko League Cup | 2013 |
| Runner-up | Empress's Cup | 2006 |
Representing Japan
AFC U-19 Women's Championship
| Gold medal – first place | 2009 China |
- * Club domestic league appearances and goals as of December 31, 2018

Yuka Kado (加戸 由佳, Kado Yuka; born June 19, 1990) is a Japanese football player. She plays for Bunnys Kyoto SC and has also played for the Japan national teamas a midfielder.

== Club career ==
Kado was born in Kurashiki on June 19, 1990. In 2004, she joined her local club, Okayama Yunogo Belle. In June 2017, she left the club due to injury. Over 14 seasons, she played 200 matches and scored 37 goals. In 2018, she joined Bunnys Kyoto SC.

== National team career ==
Kado was a member of the Japan U-20 national team in the 2008 and 2010 U-20 World Cups. In March 2013, she was selected for the Japan national team for the 2013 Algarve Cup. At that competition on March 6, she played against Norway. She played three games for Japan in 2013.

== National team statistics ==
Japan national team
| Year | Apps | Goals |
|---|---|---|
| 2013 | 3 | 0 |
| Total | 3 | 0 |
