= Marcel Mahouvé =

Cameroonian footballer

Personal information
- Date of birth: 16 January 1973 (age 53)
- Place of birth: Douala, Cameroon
- Height: 1.79 m (5 ft 10 in)
- Position: Midfielder

Senior career*
Years	Team	Apps	(Gls)
1991–1994	Tonnerre Yaoundé		
1994–1995	Dynamo Douala		
1995–1997	Putra Samarinda	42	(8)
1997–2002	Montpellier	82	(5)
2002–2003	Clermont	25	(1)
2003–2004	Inter Turku	26	(0)
2004–2005	Hamilton Academical	12	(0)
2005–2007	1. FC Saarbrücken	8	(0)
2007–2008	SS Capricorne	11	(1)
2008–2009	Persita Tangerang	18	(2)
2015	FC Miami City Champions		

International career
1995–2000	Cameroon	18	(1)
Medal record
Representing Cameroon
Africa Cup of Nations
Winner	2000 Ghana-Nigeria
- * Club domestic league appearances and goals

Marcel Mahouvé (born 16 January 1973) is a Cameroonian former professional footballer who played as a midfielder. He is a cousin of the mother of the Berlin-born siblings Francis, Sylvie and, Nicole Banecki.

Mahouvé played for Tonnerre Yaounde, Dynamo Douala, Putra Samarinda, Montpellier HSC, Clermont Foot Auvergne, FC Inter Turku, Hamilton Academical and 1. FC Saarbrücken. He was also playing for SS Capricorne in the Réunion Premier League. Mahouvé finally joined Persita Tangerang, one of the Liga Indonesia clubs.

He played for Cameroon national football team and was a participant at the 1998 FIFA World Cup. He was part of the victorious 2000 African Cup of Nations squad. In addition to his Cameroonian nationality, he also obtained the French nationality.

He is now playing as an amateur for the FC Miami City Champions in Miami the USL Premier Development League (PDL), the fourth tier of the American Soccer Pyramid, in the Southeast Division.

== Honours ==
Montpellier

- UEFA Intertoto Cup: 1999

Cameroon

- African Cup of Nations: 2000
