= Estadio Municipal Nelson Oyarzún Arenas =

Stadium in Chillán, Chile

Estadio Bicentenario Municipal Nelson Oyarzún
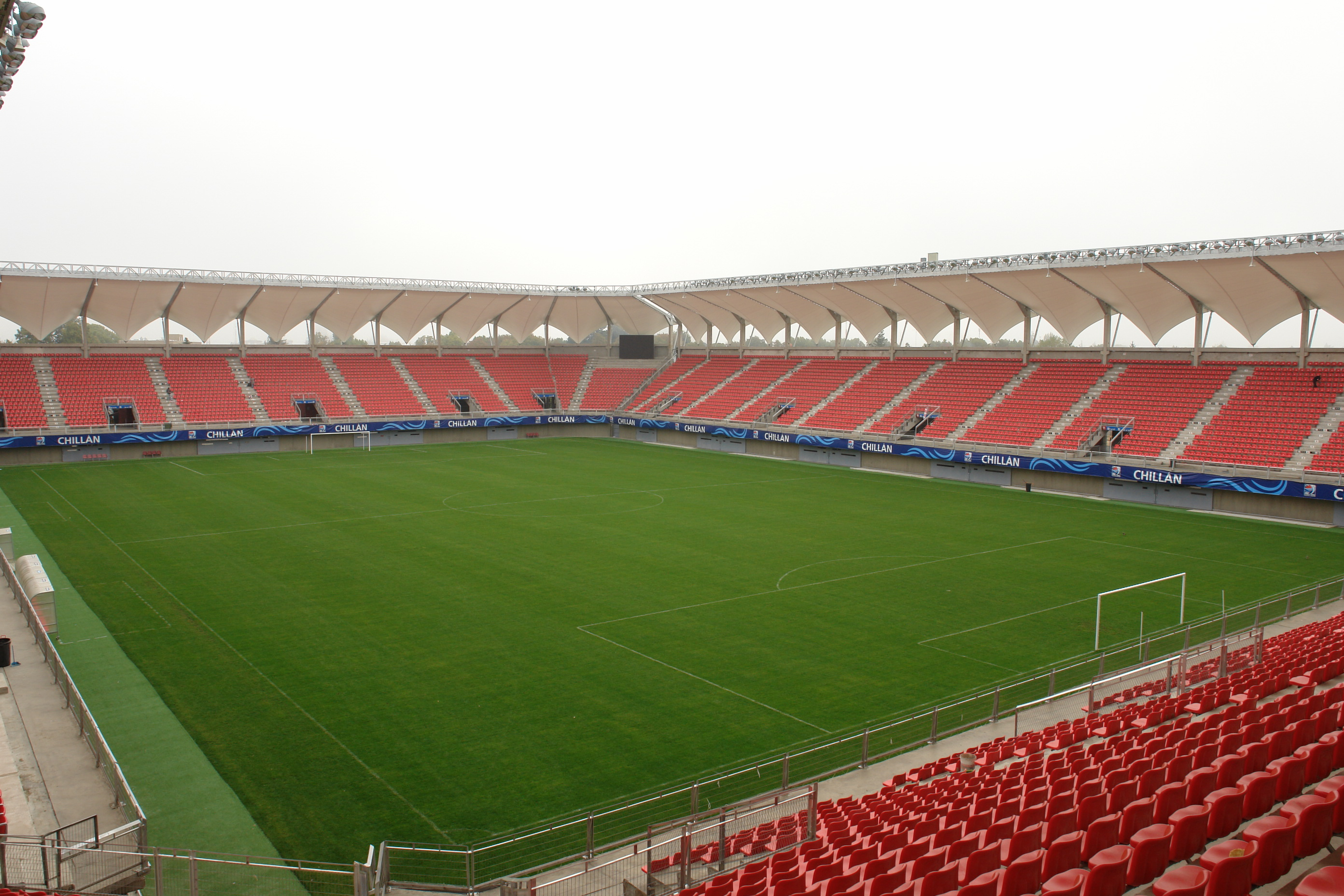
- Estadio Municipal Nelson Oyarzún Arenas
- Interactive map of Estadio Bicentenario Municipal Nelson Oyarzún
- Full name: Estadio Bicentenario Municipal Nelson Oyarzún
- Former names: Estadio Municipal de Chillán (1961—1978); Estadio Municipal Nelson Oyarzún (1978—2008)
- Location: Chillán, Chile
- Coordinates: 36°37′05″S 72°06′27″W
- Owner: Municipality of Chillán
- Capacity: 12,000; 11,319 (international)
- Surface: grass

Construction
- Built: January 28 to September 26, 2008 (reconstruction)
- Opened: 1961 (opening); November 2, 2008 (reopening)
- Architects: Judson & Olivos Arquitectos

Tenant
- Ñublense

Estadio Bicentenario Municipal Nelson Oyarzún is a stadium located in Chillán, Chile and owned by the Chillán municipality. It is home to Ñublense football club. It is named after Nelson Oyarzún Arenas, a Ñublense coach. It was inaugurated in 1961 and has a capacity of 12,000.

In 2007 the stadium was selected as a venue for the 2008 FIFA U-20 Women's World Cup, and to comply with FIFA standards, it was completely demolished and rebuilt (even the direction the pitch is facing was altered), its capacity was decreased from 17,500 to 12,000; and a roof covering all seats was built. The stadium was re-inaugurated on November 2, 2008.

== Gallery ==
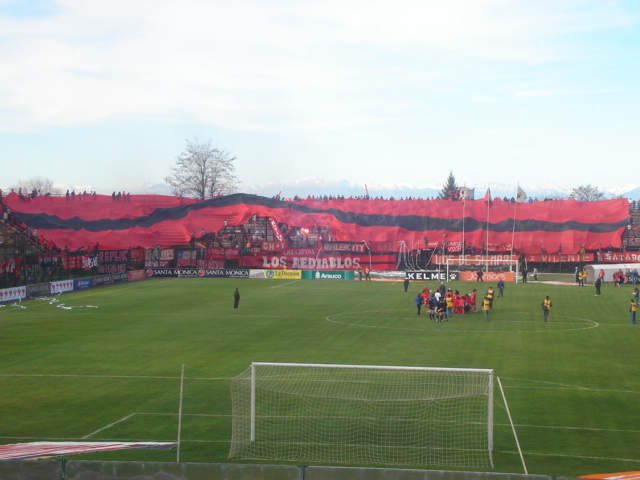
Stadium in 2007, prior to reconstruction

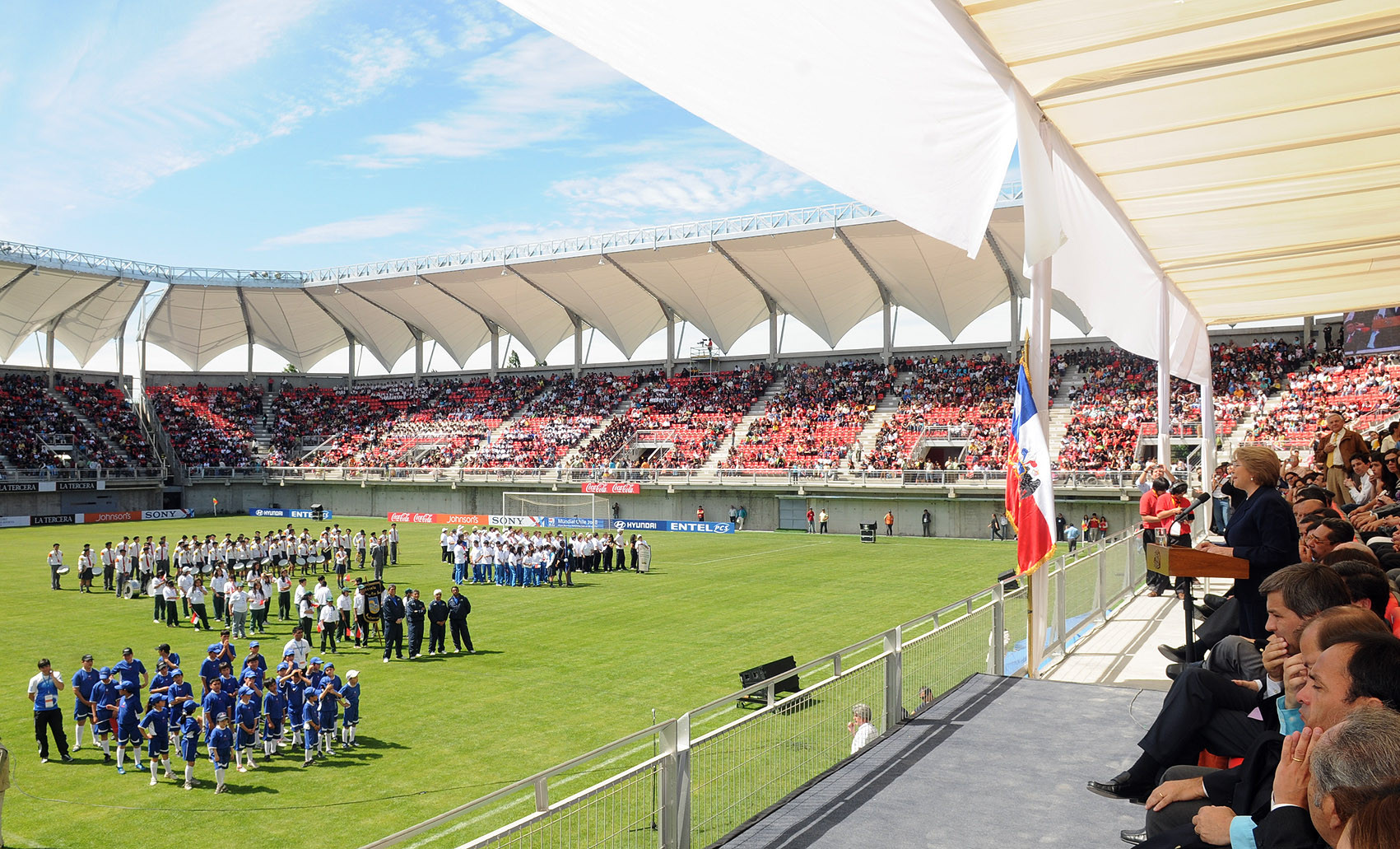
Opening Ceremony of the new stadium, 2008.
