= Jennifer Bennett (referee) =

American soccer referee

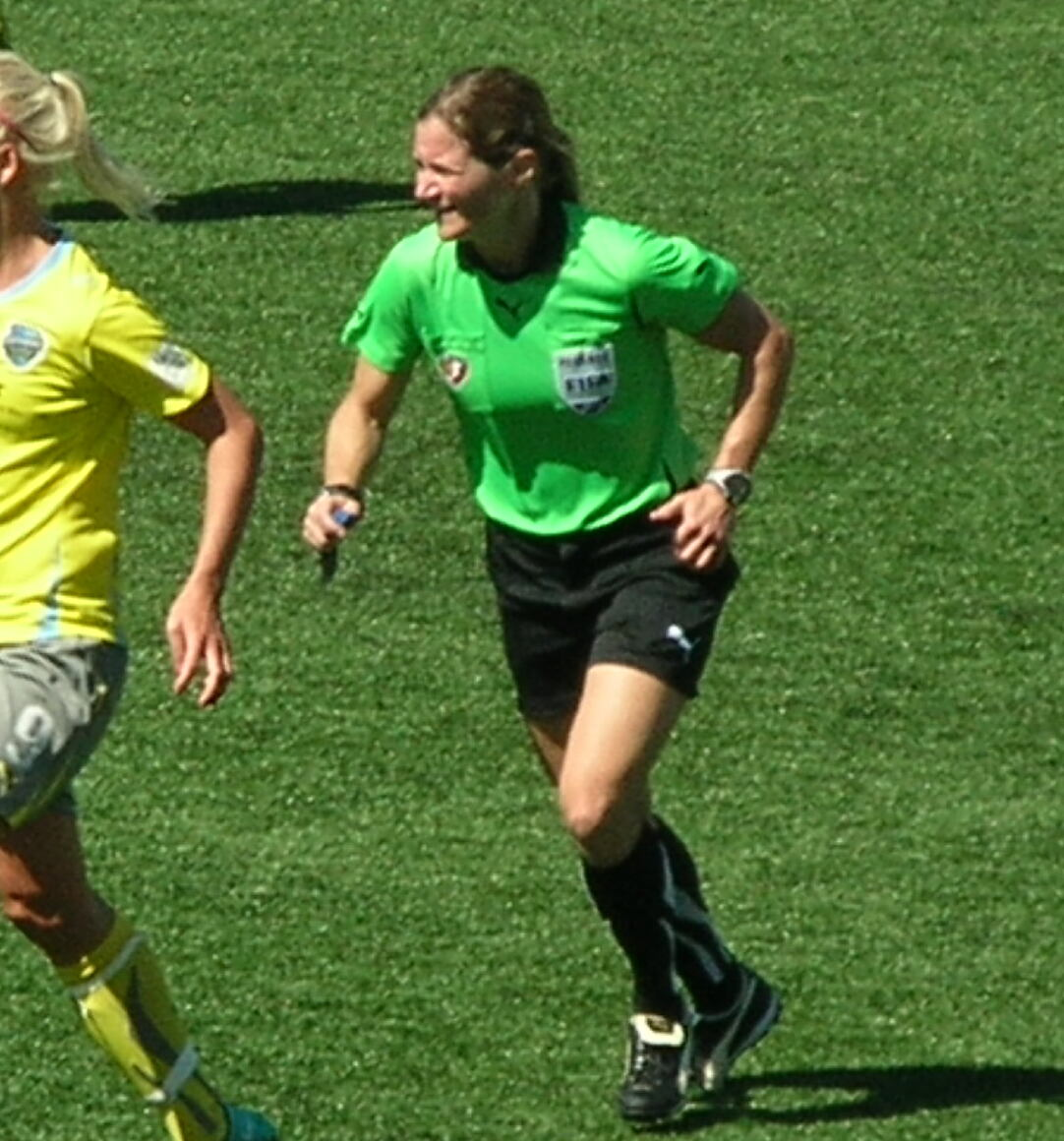
- Bennett at the 2010 WPS Final
- Born: May 4, 1971

Domestic
| Years | League | |

International
| Years | League | Role |
| 2002–2010 | FIFA | Referee |

Jennifer Bennett (born May 4, 1971) is an American former soccer referee. She refereed at the 2007 FIFA Women's World Cup.

== Career ==
Jennifer Bennett became a FIFA referee in 2002. She was selected as a fourth official at the 2003 FIFA Women's World Cup in the United States. She worked the U-20 Women's World Cup in 2006, where she was appointed the final. She worked the tournament again in 2008. Bennett was selected as a referee to the 2007 FIFA Women's World Cup in China, where she whistled two matches.

Domestically, Bennett refereed in the Women's United Soccer Association and the Women's Professional Soccer league. She was appointed the WPS final in 2010. Bennett retired from officiating after the 2010 season.
