= Maja Krantz =

Swedish football defender (born 1987)

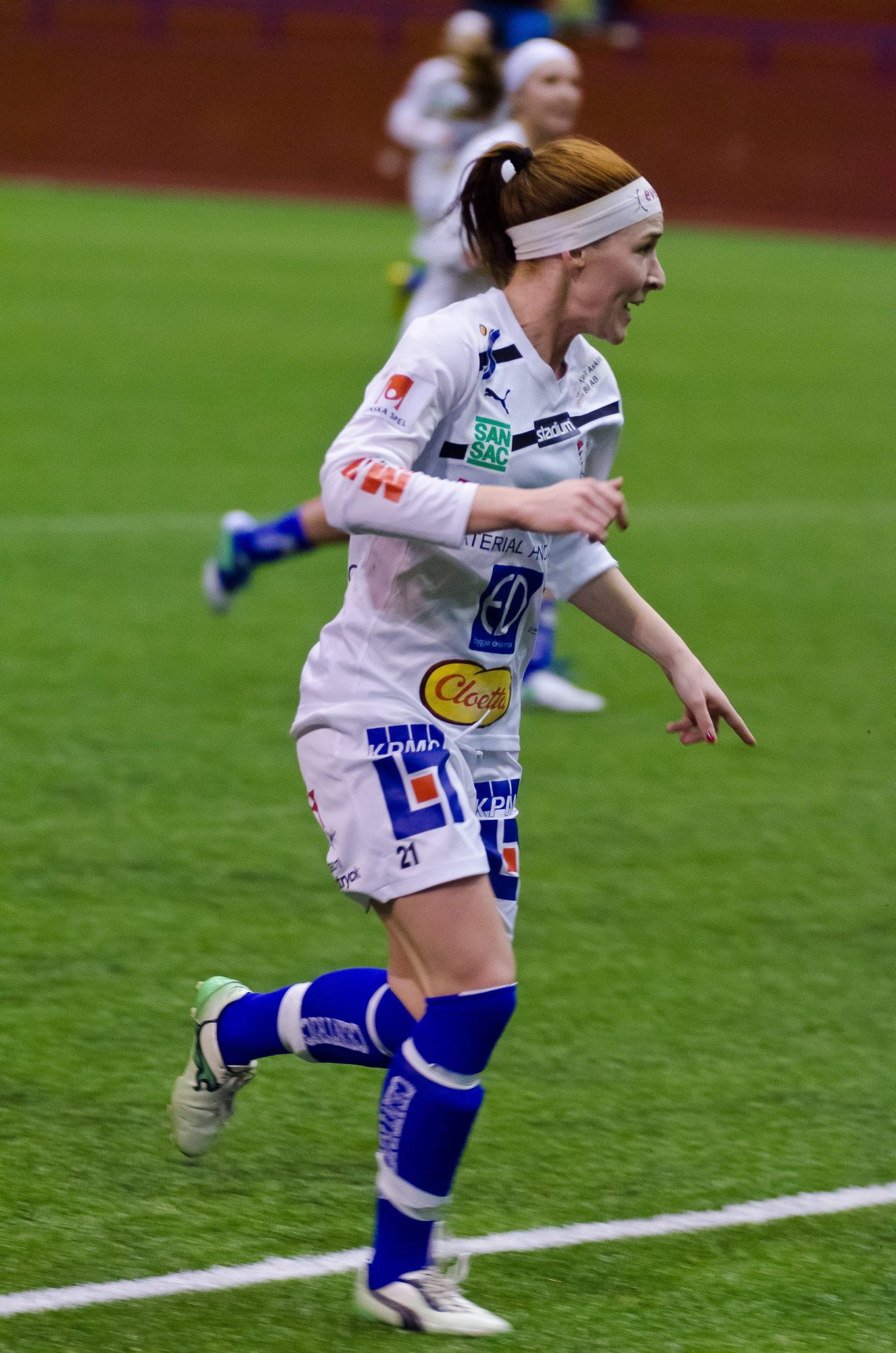

Personal information
- Full name: Maja Krantz
- Date of birth: 27 March 1987 (age 39)
- Place of birth: Helsingborg, Sweden
- Height: 1.62 m (5 ft 4 in)
- Position: Defender

Youth career
- Högaborgs BK

Senior career*
Years	Team	Apps	(Gls)
2004–2006	Stattena		
2007–2015	Linköping FC	119	(3)
2016–2017	Notts County	9	(0)
- * Club domestic league appearances and goals as of 27 June 2016

Maja Krantz (born 27 March 1987) is a Swedish former football defender. She previously played in the Damallsvenskan for Linköping FC, with whom she has also played the UEFA Women's Champions League. As a junior international she played the 2006 U-19 European Championship.

Aged 17, Krantz had joined Stattena from Högaborgs BK for the 2004 season. She signed for Linköping, ahead of the 2007 campaign.

In January 2016 Krantz transferred to Notts County of the English FA WSL.

Maja Krantz is married to former teammate and current head coach for Arsenal WFC, Renée Slegers.
