= 2007 UEFA Women's Under-19 Championship =

Tournament details
- Host country: Iceland
- Dates: 18–29 July
- Teams: 8

Final positions
- Champions: Germany (5th title)
- Runners-up: England

Tournament statistics
- Matches played: 15
- Goals scored: 45 (3 per match)
- Attendance: 4,332 (289 per match)
- Top scorer(s): (France) Marie-Laure Delie (Iceland) Fanndís Friðriksdóttir (England) Ellen White (3 goals each)
- Best player: (England) Fern Whelan

The UEFA Women's U-19 Championship 2007 Final Tournament was held in Iceland between 18 and 29 July 2007. Players born after 1 January 1988 were eligible to participate in this competition.

== Final tournament ==
=== Group stage ===
==== Group A ====
Team	Pld	W	D	L	GF	GA	GD	Pts
Germany	3	3	0	0	7	2	+5	9
Norway	3	2	0	1	7	3	+4	6
Denmark	3	1	0	2	3	4	−1	3
Iceland	3	0	0	3	3	11	−8	0

18 July 2007

Denmark	0–1	Germany
	(Report)	M. Kerschowski 19'

Víkingsvöllur, Reykjavík
Referee: Dilan Gökçek (Turkey)

18 July 2007

Iceland	0–5	Norway
	(Report)	Mjelde 40', 45' (pen.); Enget 64'; Isaksen 66'; Thorsnes 84'

Laugardalsvöllur, Reykjavík
Referee: Esther Staubli (Switzerland)

20 July 2007

Norway	0–2	Germany
	(Report)	Goddard 22'; Keßler 58'

Fylkisvöllur, Reykjavík
Referee: Efthalia Mitsi (Greece)

20 July 2007

Iceland	1–2	Denmark
Friðriksdóttir 52'	(Report)	Veje 2'; E. Madsen 45' (pen.)

Kópavogsvöllur, Kópavogur
Referee: Katalin Kulcsar (Hungary)

23 July 2007

Germany	4–2	Iceland
Wübbenhorst 8'; Keßler 22'; Bock 74'; I. Kerschowski 90+2'	(Report)	Friðriksdóttir 61' 82'

Grindavíkurvöllur, Grindavík
Referee: Danijela Markovic (Serbia)

23 July 2007

Norway	2–1	Denmark
Isaksen 75'; Herlovsen 90+3'	(Report)	Troelsgaard 80'

Akranesvöllur, Akranes
Referee: Kirsi Savolainen (Finland)

==== Group B ====
Team	Pld	W	D	L	GF	GA	GD	Pts
England	3	2	1	0	5	2	+3	7
France	3	2	0	1	6	3	+3	6
Spain	3	1	0	2	2	2	0	3
Poland	3	0	1	2	1	7	−6	1

18 July 2007

Poland	1–1	England
Eadie 11' (o.g.)	(Report)	Whelan 90+4'

Fylkisvöllur, Reykjavík
Referee: Danijela Markovic (Serbia)

18 July 2007

Spain	0–1	France
	(Report)	Henry 82'

Kópavogsvöllur, Kópavogur
Referee: Efthalia Mitsi (Greece)

20 July 2007

Poland	0–2	Spain
	(Report)	Vilas 58'; Torrejón 77'

Grindavíkurvöllur, Grindavík
Referee: Esther Staubli (Switzerland)

20 July 2007

England	3–1	France
Bradley 24'; Dowie 60'; White 90+5'	(Report)	Delie 64'

Akranesvöllur, Akranes
Referee: Kirsi Savolainen (Finland)

23 July 2007

France	4–0	Poland
Le Sommer 5'; Agard 20'; Delie 37'; Amaury 69'	(Report)

Víkingsvöllur, Reykjavík
Referee: Katalin Kulcsar (Hungary)

23 July 2007

England	1–0	Spain
Buet 20'	(Report)

KR-völlur, Reykjavík
Referee: Dilan Gökçek (Turkey)

=== Knockout stage ===
Semi-finals
Germany	4
France	2
England	3
Norway	0

Final
Germany	2
England	0

==== Semifinals ====
26 July 2007

England	3–0	Norway
White 23', 60'; Edwards 78'	(Report)

KR-völlur, Reykjavík
Referee: Katalin Kulcsar (Hungary)

26 July 2007

Germany	4–2 (a.e.t.)	France
Goddard 43'; Banecki 66'; Hartel 114'; I. Kerschowski 120+1'	(Report)	Delie 67'; Mazaloubeaud 76'

Laugardalsvöllur, Reykjavík
Referee: Esther Staubli (Switzerland)

==== Final ====
29 July 2007

Germany	2–0 (a.e.t.)	England
Bock 107'; M. Kerschowski 119'	(Report)

Laugardalsvöllur, Reykjavík
Referee: Kirsi Savolainen (Finland)

== Awards ==
2007 UEFA Women's Under-19 champions

Germany
Fifth title

== Goalscorers ==
3 goals

- (England) Ellen White
- (France) Marie-Laure Delie
- (Iceland) Fanndís Friðriksdóttir

2 goals

- (Germany) Nathalie Bock
- (Germany) Stephanie Goddard
- (Germany) Isabel Kerschowski
- (Germany) Monique Kerschowski
- (Germany) Nadine Keßler
- (Norway) Ingvild Isaksen
- (Norway) Maren Mjelde

1 goal

- (Denmark) Emma Madsen
- (Denmark) Sanne Troelsgaard
- (Denmark) Katrine Veje
- (England) Sophie Bradley
- (England) Danielle Buet
- (England) Natasha Dowie
- (England) Elizabeth Edwards
- (England) Fern Whelan
- (France) Laura Agard
- (France) Charlotte Amaury
- (France) Amandine Henry
- (France) Eugénie Le Sommer
- (France) Chloé Mazaloubeaud
- (Germany) Nicole Banecki
- (Germany) Susanne Hartel
- (Germany) Imke Wübbenhorst
- (Norway) Ida Elise Enget
- (Norway) Isabell Herlovsen
- (Norway) Elise Thorsnes
- (Spain) Marta Torrejón
- (Spain) María Paz Vilas

own goal

- (England) Jayne Eadie (playing against Poland)
