= Grace Vincent =

Australian sleep and shiftwork researcher

- Born: Grace Elizabeth Vincent
- Education: University of Auckland, Deakin University
- Employer: CQUniversity
- Known for: Shiftwork and sleep research
- Title: Associate Professor
- Website: https://www.gracevincent.com.au

Grace E Vincent is an Australian-New Zealand sleep scientist. She is an associate professor, sleep and shiftwork researcher, and science communicator at CQ University's Appleton Institute. Vincent's research focuses on improving sleep health among workers through collaborative efforts with academic researchers and industry partners. Her work aims to develop evidence-based strategies that support healthier and safer workplace environments.

== Education and career ==
Vincent has a Bachelor of Science (Honours) from the University of Auckland, and a PhD from Deakin University in 2015. Since her graduation, Vincent has worked in various roles including workplace fatigue consultancy, and as a researcher, and lecturer. Vincent joined CQ University in Australia in 2016.

Her research focus includes sleep, particularly of shift workers in high-risk industries, including miners, doctors, nurses and fire fighters, and physical activity, Her research focuses on sleep, especially for shift workers in high-risk jobs like miners, doctors, nurses, and firefighters. She also studies how physical activity, health, safety, and performance are affected by shift work in these demanding roles. This inspired her research into sleep and fatigue and impacts of firefighting.

Vincent's research focuses on three key areas: improving sleep and health in workplace settings, understanding how physical activity and diet influence sleep, and developing behavioural interventions to promote better sleep health. Vincent's research has informed governmental and organisational policies and frameworks, both nationally and internationally. Vincent co-ordinated a program of work uniting 68 international shiftwork experts across 15 countries to create tailored sleep hygiene practice guidelines for shift workers.

Vincent also co-authored two Australian Government Guidelines for managing fatigue and sleep in the workplace, for the National Mental Health Commission and the Mentally Healthy Workplace Alliance. Vincent has also led two key projects with Carers Australia culminating in an online sleep improvement course for Australia's 2.6 million caregivers, which was adopted as a standard resource by the Australian Government Department of Social Services.

Vincent was also the founding chair of the Network of Early Career Sleep Researchers in Training, the second largest council of the Australasian Sleep Association.

== Publications ==
Vincent has published more than 100 publications and over 2800 citations, as of March 2025, and an h-index of 31, according to Google Scholar.

Select peer-reviewed publications include:

- Shriane A, Rigney G, Ferguson SA, Bin Y, Vincent GE. (2023). Sleep. Healthy sleep practices for shiftworkers: consensus sleep hygiene guidelines using a Delphi methodology. 46, 1–14. https://doi.org/10.1093/sleep/zsad182
- Vincent GE, Aisbett B, Hall SJ, Ferguson SA. (2015). Fighting fire and fatigue: sleep quantity and quality during multi-day wildfire suppression. Ergonomics, 59(7), 932–940. http://dx.doi.org/10.1080/00140139.2015.1105389
- Dawson, D, Ferguson, S.A., & Vincent, G.E.(2020). Safety implications of fatigue and sleep inertia for emergency services personnel. Sleep Medicine Reviews. 55, 101386. https://doi.org/10.1016/j.smrv.2020.101386
- Binks H, Vincent GE, Gupta C, Irwin C, Khalesi S. (2020). Effects of diet on sleep: a narrative review. Nutrients. 12(4):1-18. http://dx.doi.org/10.3390/nu12040936
- Memon A, Gupta C, Crowther ME, Ferguson SA, Tuckwell GA, Vincent GE. (2021). Sleep and physical activity in university students: a systematic review and meta-analysis. Sleep Medicine Reviews. 58:1–19, 101482. https://doi.org/10.1016/j.smrv.2021.101482

== Media ==
Vincent has contributed to the media, on various topics including the impacts of shift work, to the ABC in print, radio, and on television. She also has published on sleep quality and influences on sleep, in The Conversation, as well as describing sleep hygiene in various publications in Australian newspapers, including The Age, Sydney Morning Herald and Brisbane Times.

== Awards ==
- 2018 – Rob Pierce Grant in Aid Award Winner, Australasian Sleep Association.
- 2019 – CQ Vice Chancellor's Award for Outstanding ECRs.
- 2020 – National 5-Minute Research Pitch Competition Winner.
- 2020 – South Australian Tall Poppy Award Winner.
- 2022 – International Journal of Environmental Research and Public Health Young Investigator Award 2021.
- 2023 – Nick Antic Career Development Award Winner, Australasian Sleep Association.
