= Stephanie Goddard =

German footballer

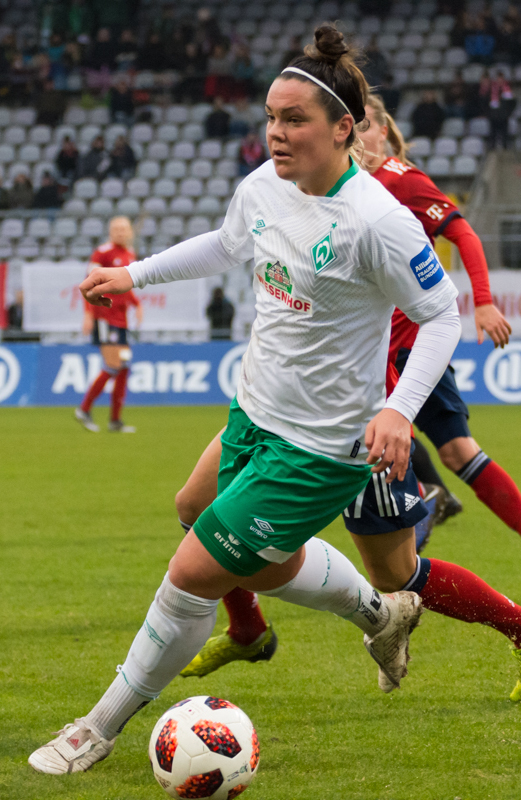
- Goddard in 2018

Personal information
- Date of birth: 15 February 1988 (age 38)
- Place of birth: Rinteln, West Germany
- Height: 1.72 m (5 ft 8 in)
- Positions: Midfielder; striker

Senior career*
Years	Team	Apps	(Gls)
2004–2007	Gütersloh	64	(42)
2007–2009	FCR 2001 Duisburg	22	(10)
2009–2010	Essen-Schönebeck	19	(4)
2011	Hampton Roads Piranhas		
2011–2021	Werder Bremen	152	(63)
- * Club domestic league appearances and goals

Stephanie Goddard (born 15 February 1988) is a German former footballer who played as a midfielder for Werder Bremen in the Frauen-Bundesliga. She previously played for FCR 2001 Duisburg (with whom she won the 2008–09 UEFA Women's Cup) and SG Essen-Schönebeck in the Bundesliga and Hampton Roads Piranhas in the United States' W-League.

As an Under–19 international she won the 2007 U–19 European Championship.

Goddard retired from playing in May 2021, aged 33.
