= Rebecca Kalu =

Nigerian footballer

Personal information
- Date of birth: 12 June 1990 (age 36)
- Position: Midfielder

Team information
- Current team: Delta Queens

Senior career*
Years	Team	Apps	(Gls)
2009	Piteå IF		
2010-	Delta Queens F.C.		

International career^{‡}
- Nigeria
- * Club domestic league appearances and goals ‡ National team caps and goals as of 26 June 2011 (before the 2011 FIFA Women's World Cup)

Rebecca Kalu (born 12 June 1990) has represented the Nigeria women's national under-20 football team as a midfielder at the 2008 and 2010 FIFA U-20 Women's World Cups. She was in the Nigeria squad for the 2011 FIFA Women's World Cup but did not make an appearance in the tournament. At the club level, she plays for Delta Queens
