= Renee Leota =

New Zealand footballer (born 1990)

Personal information
- Full name: Renee Lyn Leota
- Date of birth: 16 May 1990 (age 36)
- Place of birth: Wellington, New Zealand
- Height: 1.65 m (5 ft 5 in)
- Position: Striker

Team information
- Current team: Waterside Karori

International career
Years	Team	Apps	(Gls)
2006–2010	New Zealand U-20		
2006–	New Zealand	15	(1)

Renee Leota (born 16 May 1990) is a New Zealand football player who played for the New Zealand women's national football team and competed at the 2008 Summer Olympics.

== Career ==
Leota was born in Wellington. She made her senior international debut as a substitute in a 0–3 loss to China PR on 14 November 2006.

She was included in the New Zealand squad for the 2008 Summer Olympics, appearing as a substitute in both the 2–2 draw with Japan and the 0–1 loss to Norway.

Leota, who had made a single substitute appearance at the 2006 Women's U-20 World Cup finals in Russia as they held Brazil to a goalless draw, was again included in the U-20 squad for the 2008 Women's U-20 World Cup finals in Chile. She appeared in the first group game as a second-half substitute as New Zealand lost 2–3 against African champions, Nigeria, and scored with her first touch of the ball in their second group game as she came on as a 65th-minute substitute, helping NZ to a 4–3 win over the hosts. In 2010, she represented New Zealand for a third Under-20 World Cup, this time in Germany, playing in all three group games.
