= Delphine Chatelin =

French footballer

Personal information
- Date of birth: 17 May 1988 (age 38)
- Place of birth: Pau, Pyrénées-Atlantiques, France
- Height: 1.57 m (5 ft 2 in)
- Position: Winger

Delphine Chatelin (born 17 May 1988) is a retired French footballer who played as a left-back for Toulouse. Delphine has previously played for Bordeaux and Santa Clarita Blue Heat in the W-League.
