= Amber van der Heijde =

Dutch footballer

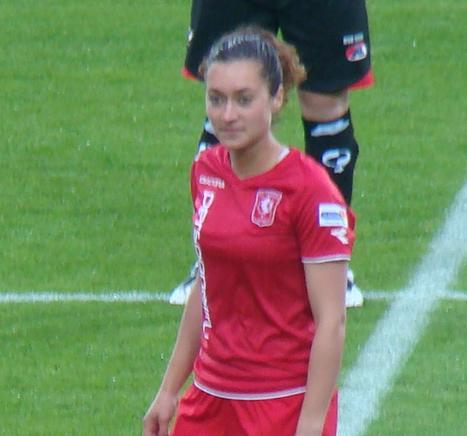

Personal information
- Full name: Amber van der Heijde
- Date of birth: 17 August 1988 (age 38)
- Place of birth: Purmerend, Netherlands
- Position: Midfielder

Youth career
- District West
- V.V Hollandia
- Fortuna Wormerveer

Senior career*
Years	Team	Apps	(Gls)
2007–2010	Twente	27	(0)
2010–2011	AZ	15	(0)
2011–2015	Telstar	47	(3)
Total		89	(3)

International career
2003	Netherlands U15	2	(0)
2005	Netherlands U17	4	(0)
2005–2007	Netherlands U19	23	(1)
- * Club domestic league appearances and goals

Amber van der Heijde is a Dutch former football midfielder who last played for Telstar. She previously played in the Eredivisie for FC Twente and AZ, with which she played the Champions League. She has been an U-19 international.

== Career ==
=== AZ ===
Van der Heijde made her league debut against VVV-Venlo on 28 October 2010.

=== Telstar ===
Van der Heijde made her league debut against ADO Den Haag on 9 September 2011. She scored her first league goal against ADO Den Haag on 27 April 2012, scoring in the 26th minute.

== International career ==
Van der Heijde was part of the Netherlands U19 team that reached the final of the U19 European Championships.

== Fitness career ==
After retiring, van der Heijde became a personal trainer, becoming the owner of Fit20 Purmerend.
