= Nicole Banecki =

German football player

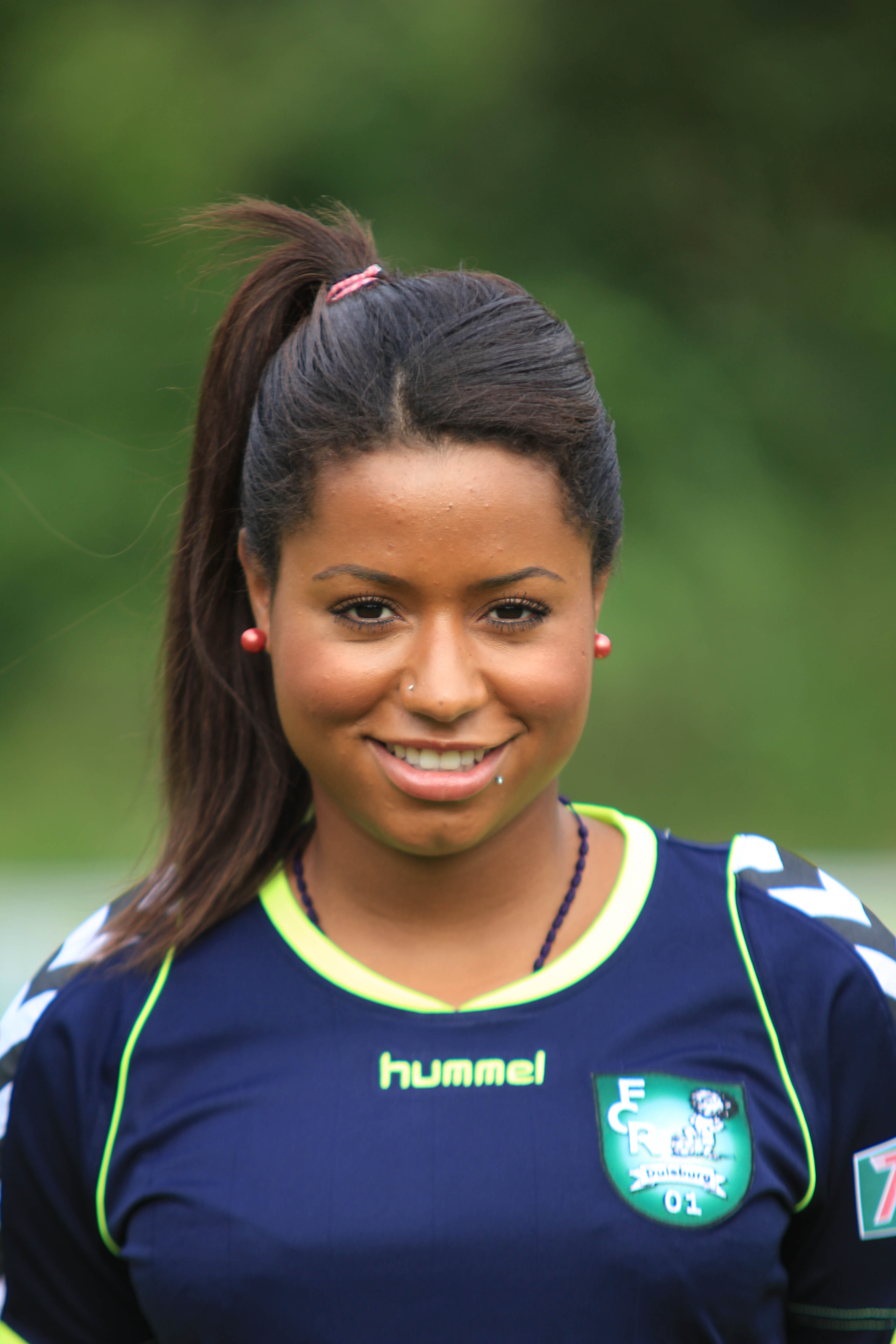
- Banecki in 2012

Personal information
- Full name: Nicole Banecki
- Date of birth: 3 September 1988 (age 38)
- Place of birth: Berlin, Germany
- Height: 1.70 m (5 ft 7 in)
- Position: Forward

Youth career
- Reinickendorfer Füchse
- SC Tegel
- MSV Normannia 08 Berlin

Senior career*
Years	Team	Apps	(Gls)
2004–2006	Tennis Borussia Berlin	30	(9)
2006–2012	Bayern Munich	91	(11)
2012–2013	Duisburg	8	(0)
2013–2014	Kriens	24	(16)
2014–2017	Freiburg	0	(0)
2016–2017	Freiburg II	2	(0)
2017–2019	Basel	38	(9)
2019–2021	Bayer Leverkusen	1	(0)
2021–	Staaken	2	(0)

International career
2008	Germany U-20	9	(3)
2008–2009	Germany	5	(0)
- * Club domestic league appearances and goals

Nicole Banecki (born 3 September 1988) is a German footballer.

== International career ==
Born in Germany, Banecki is of Cameroonian descent. She made her debut in the German national team on 7 March 2008 against Finland.

Banecki played for Germany at the 2008 FIFA U-20 Women's World Cup finals in Chile.

== Personal life ==
Banecki was born in Germany to a German father and Cameroonian mother. Her brother Francis and twin sister Sylvie are professional footballers in Germany. Her uncle Marcel Mahouvé was a Cameroonian footballer.

== Honours ==
- U-19 European Championship winner – 2007
- U-20 Women's World Cup third place – 2008
