= Nathalie Bock =

German football midfielder

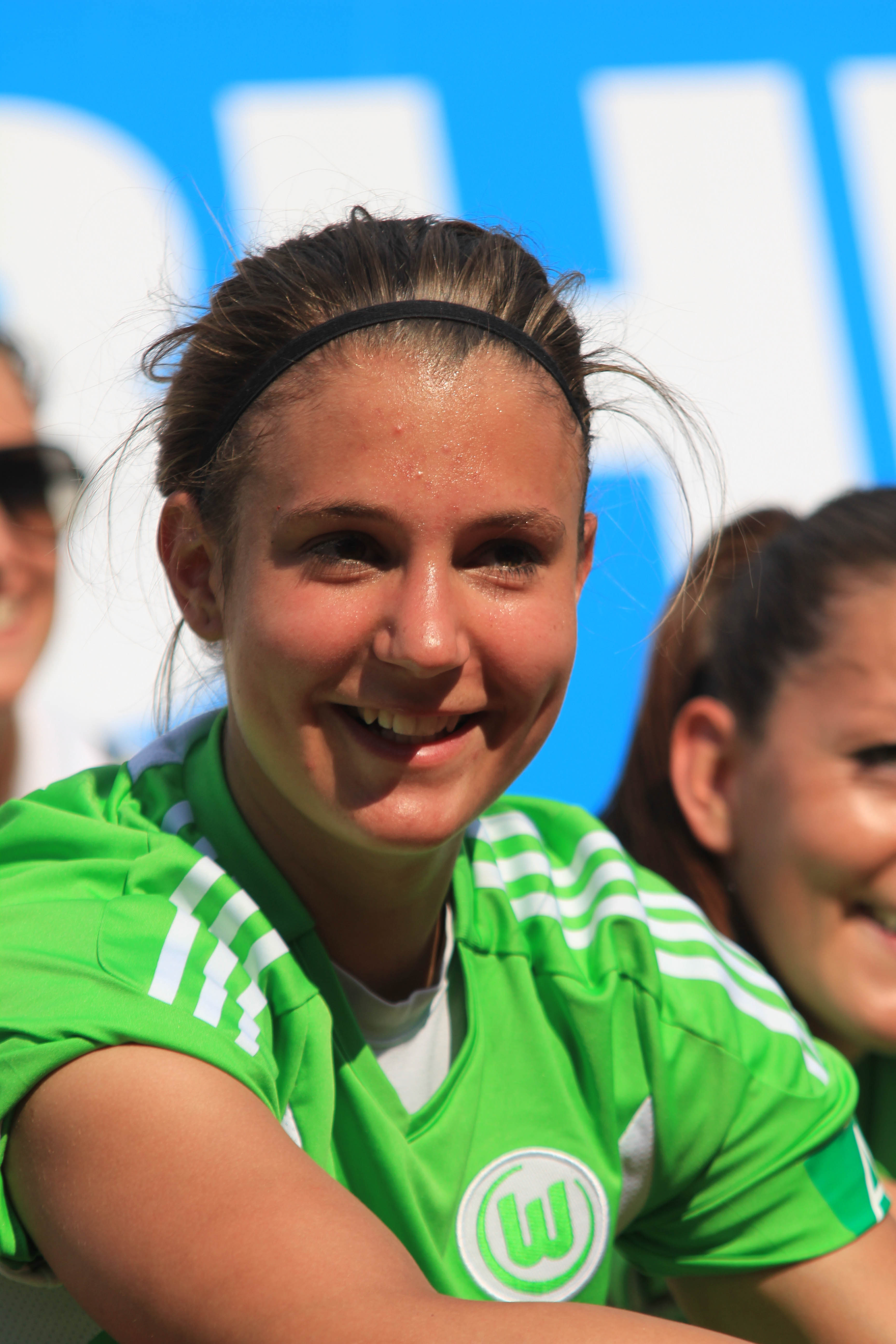

Personal information
- Full name: Nathalie Bock
- Date of birth: 21 October 1988 (age 38)
- Place of birth: Recklinghausen, West Germany
- Height: 1.69 m (5 ft 7 in)
- Position: Midfielder

Youth career
- –2005: Blau Weiß Post Recklinghausen
- 2003–2004: SG Wattenscheid 09

Senior career*
Years	Team	Apps	(Gls)
2004–2005	SG Wattenscheid 09	20	(3)
2005–2006	FFC Heike Rheine	20	(2)
2006–2012	VfL Wolfsburg	81	(1)
2012–2013	BV Cloppenburg	15	(3)
2013–2015	VfL Oythe		
2015–2018	DJK Arminia Ibbenbüren		

International career^{‡}
2003–2005	Germany U17	13	(0)
2005–2007	Germany U19	14	(1)
2008	Germany U20	8	(1)
2006	Germany U21	1	(0)
2008–2009	Germany U23	5	(0)
- * Club domestic league appearances and goals as of 1 August 2018 ‡ National team caps and goals as of 17 July 2009

Nathalie Bock (born 21 October 1988) is a German football midfielder.

== Career ==
=== Statistics ===
As of 1 August 2018

Club	Season	League			Cup		League Cup		Total	
Club	Season	Division	Apps	Goals	Apps	Goals	Apps	Goals	Apps	Goals
SG Wattenscheid 09	2004–05	2. Bundesliga	20	3			—			
SG Wattenscheid 09	Total		20	3			0	0		
FFC Heike Rheine	2005–06	Bundesliga	20	2			—			
FFC Heike Rheine	Total		20	2			0	0		
VfL Wolfsburg	2006–07	Bundesliga	20	0			—			
VfL Wolfsburg	2007–08	Bundesliga	8	0			3 (Note: Appearances in the 2007 Bundesliga Cup.)	0		
VfL Wolfsburg	2008–09	Bundesliga	15	0			—			
VfL Wolfsburg	2009–10	Bundesliga	17	1	3	0	—		20	1
VfL Wolfsburg	2010–11	Bundesliga	14	0	1	0	—		15	0
VfL Wolfsburg	2011–12	Bundesliga	7	0	0	0	5 (Note: Appearances in the 2011 Bundesliga Cup.)	0	12	0
VfL Wolfsburg	Total		81	1			8	0		
BV Cloppenburg	2012–13	2. Bundesliga	15	3	3	1	—		18	4
BV Cloppenburg	Total		15	3	3	1	0	0	18	4
VfL Oythe	2013–14	Landesliga Niedersachsen			—		—			
VfL Oythe	2014–15	Oberliga Niedersachsen			—		—			
VfL Oythe	Total				0	0	0	0		
DJK Arminia Ibbenbüren	2015–16	Verbandsliga Westfalen			—		—			
DJK Arminia Ibbenbüren	2016–17	Verbandsliga Westfalen			3	1	—			
DJK Arminia Ibbenbüren	2017–18	Verbandsliga Westfalen			—		—			
DJK Arminia Ibbenbüren	Total				3	1	0	0		
Career total							8	0		

== International career ==
As an Under-19 international Bock won the 2007 U-19 European Championships, where she scored two goals including Germany's opening goal in the final's extra time.
