= Monique Kerschowski =

German footballer

Personal information
- Full name: Monique Kerschowski
- Date of birth: 22 January 1988 (age 38)
- Place of birth: Berlin, Germany
- Position: Defender

Team information
- Current team: 1. FFC Turbine Potsdam
- Number: 3

Youth career
- 2000–2005: BSC Marzahn

Senior career*
Years	Team	Apps	(Gls)
2005–2012	1.FFC Turbine Potsdam	34	(1)
- * Club domestic league appearances and goals ‡ National team caps and goals as of 14 November 2007

Monique Kerschowski (born 22 January 1988 in Berlin) is a German former footballer who played as a defender. She last played for 1. FFC Turbine Potsdam.

== Career ==
Kerschowski was a successful track and field athlete, had to retire due to a knee injury in 2000. She then started to play football with her twin sister Isabel. One day when the twins went out to buy football shoes, a manager from the club BSC Marzahn invited them for a practice session. In 2005, they both moved to 1. FFC Turbine Potsdam. A year later, the twins won the European under 19 Championship. Monique scored one goal while her sister scored twice. The Kerschowski twins won this title also in 2007. Monique suffered a severe knee injury in September 2007. Several further injuries let her retire in 2012.

Kerschowski played for Germany at the 2006 and 2008 FIFA U-20 Women's World Championship.
