= Marine Pervier-Arragon =

French footballer (born 1990)

Marine Pervier
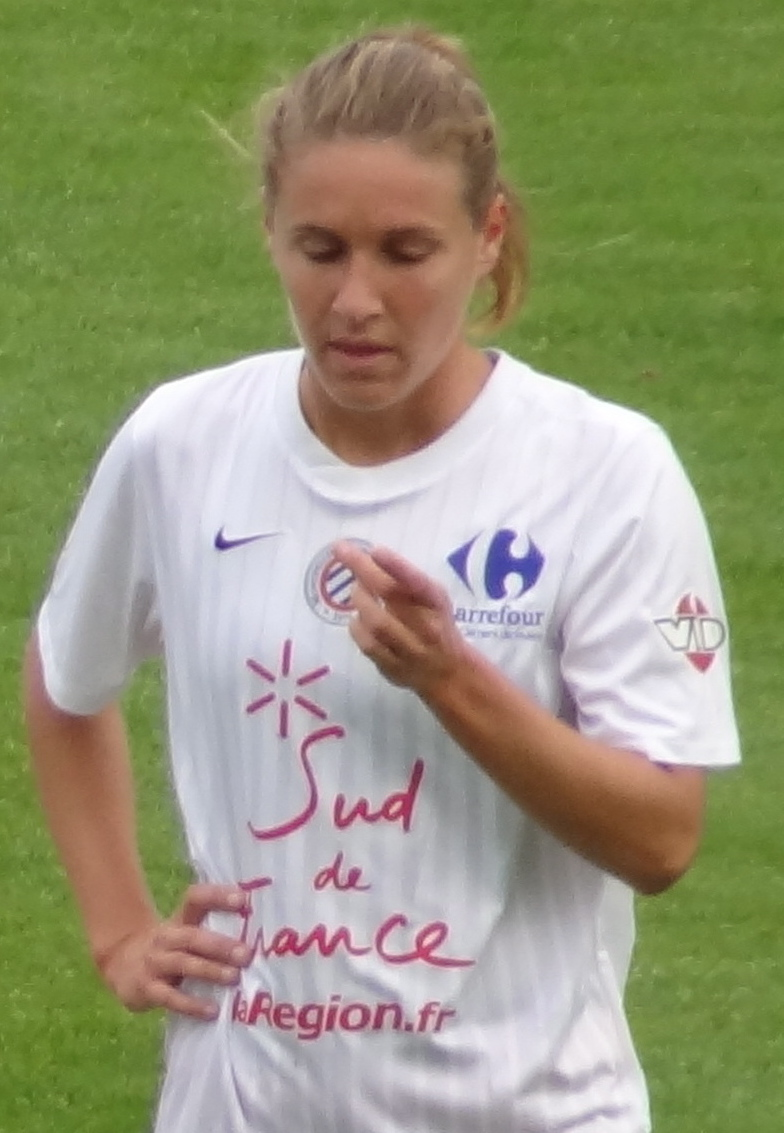
- Pervier playing for Montpellier in 2012

Personal information
- Date of birth: 1 February 1990 (age 36)
- Place of birth: Nantes, France
- Position: Midfielder

Youth career
- 2004–2005: Saint-Herblain
- 2005–2006: Montpellier

Senior career*
Years	Team	Apps	(Gls)
2005–2013	Montpellier	122	(14)
2014–2016	Nîmes	53	(7)
2016–2018	Guingamp	46	(4)
2018–2022	Nantes	15	(5)

International career
2006	France U17	5	(2)
2008–2009	France U19	13	(2)
2009–2010	France U20	6	(2)
- * Club domestic league appearances and goals

Marine Pervier-Arragon (born 1 February 1990) is a former French professional footballer who played as a midfielder.
