= Sarah Michael =

Nigerian footballer

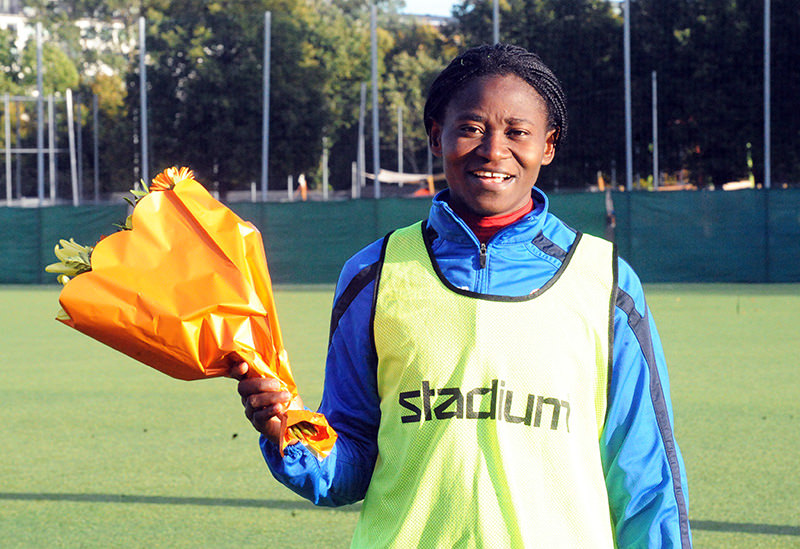

Personal information
- Full name: Sarah Michael
- Date of birth: 22 July 1990 (age 36)
- Place of birth: Ibadan, Nigeria
- Height: 1.72 m (5 ft 8 in)
- Position: Striker

Team information
- Current team: Lidköpings
- Number: 13

Senior career*
Years	Team	Apps	(Gls)
- Summer Queens
2008–2009	Ebony Queens		
2009	Piteå IF	6	(1)
2010	Djurgården	19	(7)
2011–2015	Örebro	86	(37)
2018	Lidköpings	25	(5)
2019	Kvarnsvedens IK	22	(5)
2020-2021	Mallbackens	18	(7)
2022-	Lidköpings	5	(2)

International career
2008–2011	Nigeria	5	(0)
- * Club domestic league appearances and goals as of 19:15, 29 February 2020 (UTC)

Sarah Michael (born 22 July 1990) is a Nigerian footballer who plays as a striker for Elitettan club Lidköpings and the Nigeria women's national team.

She was part of the Nigerian squad that took part in the 2008 Summer Olympics and the 2011 World Cup.
