= Ogonna Chukwudi =

Nigerian footballer

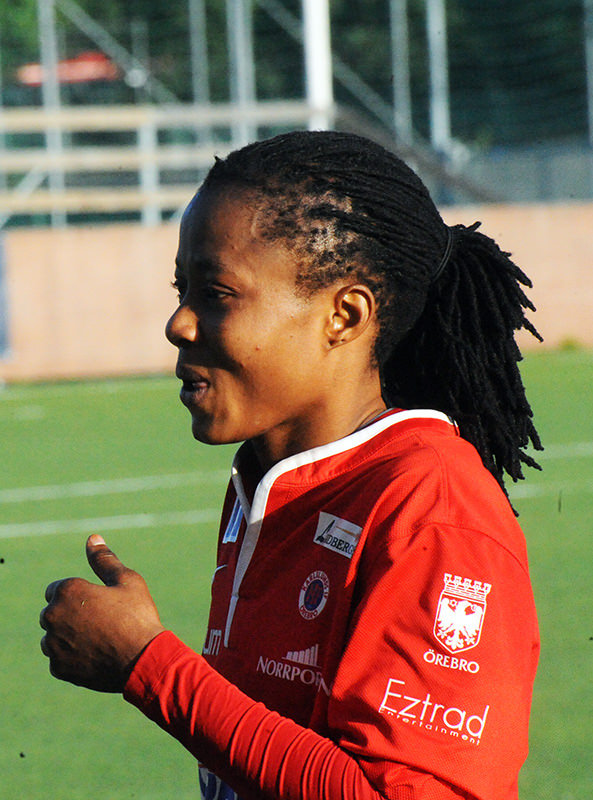
- Action

Personal information
- Full name: Ogonna Franca Chukwudi
- Date of birth: 14 September 1988 (age 38)
- Place of birth: Enugu, Nigeria
- Height: 1.61 m (5 ft 3 in)
- Position: Midfielder

Senior career*
Years	Team	Apps	(Gls)
2005–2010	Nassarawa Amazons	23	(23)
2011–2013	Umeå	59	(9)
2014–2016	KIF Örebro	56	(14)
2017–2018	Kristianstads DFF	42	(7)
2019	Djurgårdens IF	18	(1)
2020	CSKA Moscow	0	(0)
2021	Madrid CFF	2	(0)
2021–2022	Lazio	6	(0)
2022	Torres	4	(1)

International career
2006–	Nigeria	20	(3)
- * Club domestic league appearances and goals as of 00:25, 1 February 2021 (UTC)

Ogonna Franca Chukwudi (born 14 September 1988) is a Nigerian footballer who plays as a midfielder for the Nigeria women's national team.

== Club career ==
Chukwudi previously played for Umeå IK in Damallsvenskan, the first tier of women's football in Sweden.

== International career ==
Chukwudi represented Nigeria at the 2011 FIFA Women's World Cup.
