= Bârgău =

Bârgău may refer to:

- Bârgău, a village in the commune Cicârlău, Maramureș County
- Bârgău (river), a river in Bistrița-Năsăud County, Romania
- Bârgău Mountains, mountain range in Romania, part of the Carpathian Mountains
- Bârgău Pass or Borgo Pass, alternative names for the Tihuța Pass in Romania
- Bistrița Bârgăului, a commune in Bistrița-Năsăud County, Romania
- Josenii Bârgăului, a commune in Bistrița-Năsăud County, Romania
- Prundu Bârgăului, a commune in Bistrița-Năsăud County, Romania
- Tiha Bârgăului, a commune in Bistrița-Năsăud County, Romania
