= Prundu Bârgăului =

- Commune
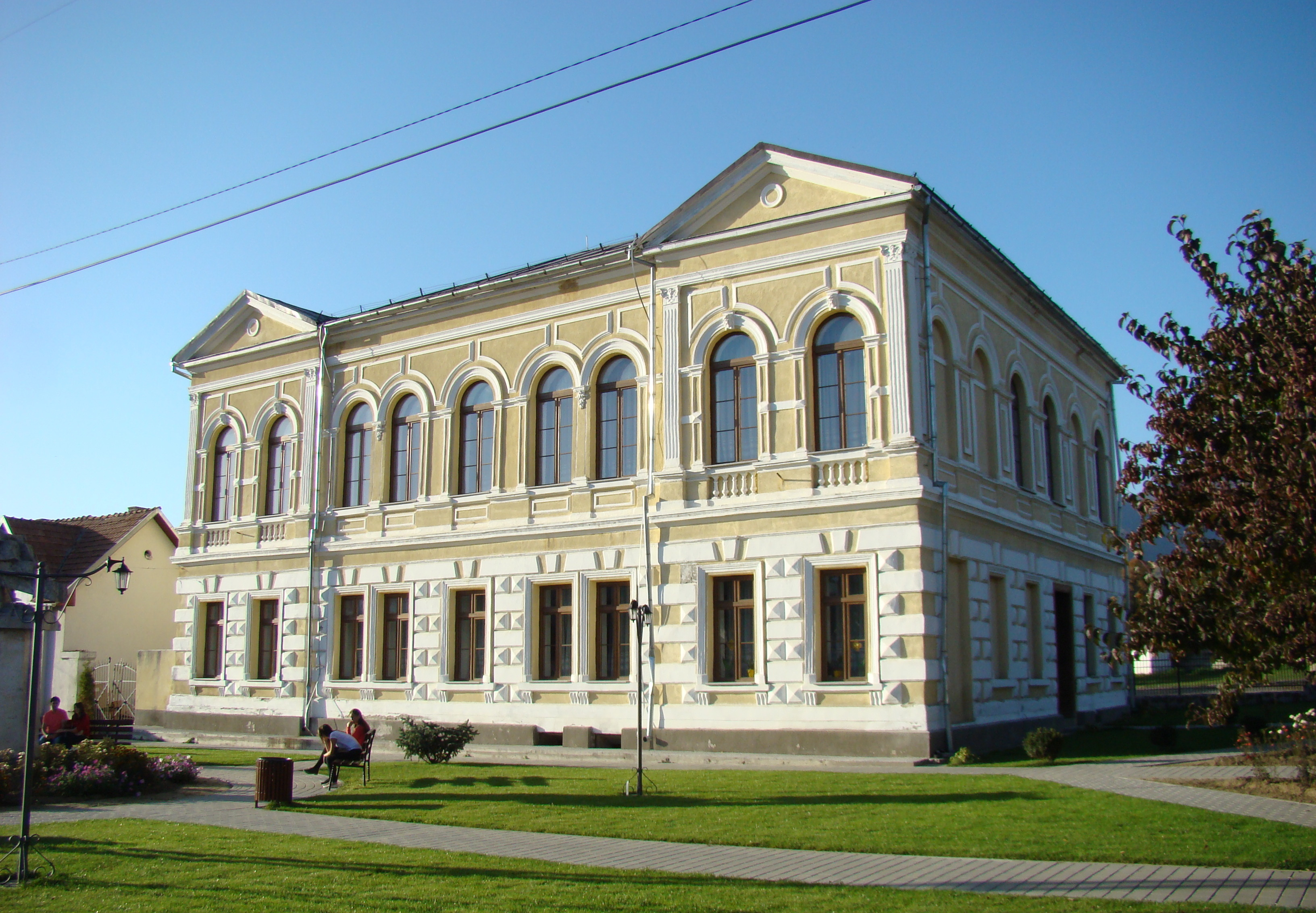
- Former border hotel, today the elementary school

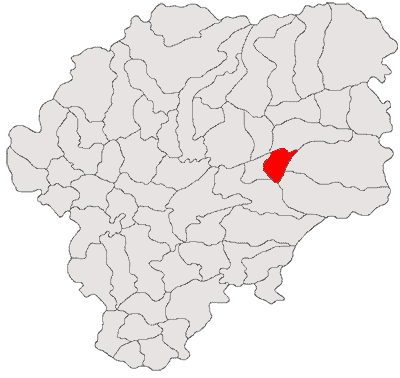
- Location in Bistrița-Năsăud County

- Location in Romania
- Coordinates: 47.2833°N 24.7333°E
- Country: Romania
- County: Bistrița-Năsăud

Government
  - Mayor (2020–2024): Doru-Toader Crișan (PSD)
- Area: 47.50 km^{2} (18.34 sq mi)
- Elevation: 506 m (1,660 ft)
- Population (2021-12-01): 5,924
  - Density: 124.7/km^{2} (323.0/sq mi)
- Time zone: UTC+02:00 (EET)
  - Summer (DST): UTC+03:00 (EEST)
- Postal code: 427230
- Vehicle reg.: BN
- Website: www.prundubargaului.ro

Prundu Bârgăului (Hungarian: Borgóprund; German: Borgo-Prund or Burgau) is a commune in Bistrița-Năsăud County, Romania, in the historical region of Transylvania. It is composed of two villages, Prundu Bârgăului and Susenii Bârgăului (Felsőborgó).

== Geography ==
The commune is located in the central-east part of the county, at the northeastern edge of the Transylvanian Plateau. It lies on the banks of the river Bistrița, a river sometimes referred to as Bistrița ardeleană or Bistricioara. The river Bârgău flows through the commune and discharges there into the Bistrița.

Prundu Bârgăului is situated in the foothills of the Călimani Mountains and of the Bârgău Mountains, whose tallest peak, the Heniu Mare, with a height of 1,611 m (5,285 ft), dominates the area. It borders the following communes: Leșu to the north, Josenii Bârgăului to the west, Livezile to the south, Bistrița Bârgăului to the southeast, and Tiha Bârgăului to the east.

National road DN17 (part of European route E58) connects Bistrița Bârgăului to the county seat, Bistrița, 22 km (14 mi) to the west, and to Vatra Dornei, 61 km (38 mi) to the east, in Suceava County. The commune has two train stations that serve the CFR Line 406, which runs from Bistrița Bârgăului to Bistrița North and on to the town of Luduș in Mureș County.

== History ==
Although the information about the remote past of the Bârgău Valley is scarce and fragmented, the archaeological remains reveal that the valley was inhabited since the end of the Neolithic Age or the beginning of the Bronze Age. After the conquest of Dacia by the Romans and its colonization, the Roman rule extended to the western border of the Bârgău Valley. After the withdrawal of the Roman rule, the region was crossed by different migratory peoples of Slavic (from the 7th century) and Turkic origin, who left names in the local toponymy (e.g., the Slavic origin names of Bistrița, Tiha, Miroslava).

In the 13th and early 14th century, after it entered into and organized Transylvania as a vassal voivodeship, the Hungarian crown sought to also control the mountain valleys of Transylvania. The Bârgău region is attested for the first time with the occasion of these attempts. The first documentary attestation of the Bârgău, appearing under the name Borgo, dates back to 1317, when a committee of officials of the Doboka and Szolnok counties made a division of properties in the Bârgău Mountains between the related nobility families Bethlen and Apaffy.

== Current affairs ==
The Heniu Prundu Bârgăului is a women's football club based in the commune. Founded in 2013, the club plays in Liga I, the first tier of the Romanian women's football system. The Heniu stadium has a capacity of 500.

Prundu Bârgăului is the headquarters of the 817th Artillery Battalion "Petru Rareș". Founded in 1995, this unit of the Romanian Land Forces is part of the 81st Mechanized Brigade "General Grigore Bălan", which is aligned with the German Army's Rapid Forces Division and is headquartered in Bistrița.

== Natives ==
- Alexander Gassner (born 1989), German skeleton racer
- Monica Lăzăruț (born 1977), Romanian cross-country skier
