= Ilva Mare =

- Commune
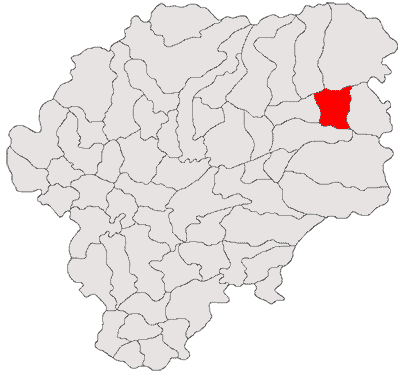
- Location in Bistrița-Năsăud County

- Location in Romania
- Coordinates: 47°22′N 24°54′E
- Country: Romania
- County: Bistrița-Năsăud

Government
  - Mayor (2024–2028): Alexandru Anca (PSD)
- Area: 83.28 km^{2} (32.15 sq mi)
- Elevation: 620 m (2,030 ft)
- Population (2021-12-01): 2,338
  - Density: 28.07/km^{2} (72.71/sq mi)
- Time zone: UTC+02:00 (EET)
  - Summer (DST): UTC+03:00 (EEST)
- Postal code: 427090
- Area code: +(40) x63
- Vehicle reg.: BN
- Website: primariailvamare.ro

Ilva Mare (Hungarian: Nagyilva; German: Grossilwa) is a commune in Bistrița-Năsăud County, Transylvania, Romania. It is composed of two villages, Ilva Mare and Ivăneasa (Mihalyászatanya).

The commune is situated in the Bârgău Mountains, at an altitude of 620 m (2,030 ft), on the banks of the river Ilva. It is located in the northeastern part of Bistrița-Năsăud County, 52 km (32 mi) from the county seat, Bistrița. Ilva Mare borders the following communes: Lunca Ilvei to the east, Leșu to the south, Tiha Bârgăului to the southeast, Măgura Ilvei to the west, Rodna to the northwest, and Șanț to the northeast.

Historical population
| Year | Pop. | ±% |
|---|---|---|
| 2002 | 2,569 | — |
| 2011 | 2,274 | −11.5% |
| 2021 | 2,338 | +2.8% |
Source: Census data

At the 2021 census, the commune had a population of 2,338; of those, 89.14% were Romanians and 7.74% Roma.

== Natives ==
- Alexander Vencel (born 1944), footballer
