= Ilva (disambiguation) =

Ilva may refer to:

- ILVA, a Danish chain of furniture stores
- Ilva (company), an Italian steelworks company
- Ilva (Mureș), a river in Mureș County, Romania
- Ilva (planthopper) in the Achilidae
- Ilva (Someș), a river in Bistrița-Năsăud County, Romania
- Ilva Mică, a commune in Bistrița-Năsăud County, Romania
- Ilva Mare, a commune in Bistrița-Năsăud County, Romania
- Ilva, the ancient name of the island of Elba
