= Alexander Vencel =

Alexander Vencel may refer to:

- Alexander Vencel (born 1944) (1944-), Slovak football goalkeeper who represented Czechoslovakia
- Alexander Vencel (born 1967) (1967-), Slovak football goalkeeper who represented Slovakia
- Alexander Vencel (born 1996) (1996-), Slovak football goalkeeper who currently plays for RC Strasbourg Alsace U-19 and Slovakia U-19.
