= Ilva (Someș) =

- Location within Romania

Location
- Country: Romania
- Counties: Bistrița-Năsăud County

Physical characteristics
- Mouth: Someșul Mare
  - location: Ilva Mică
  - coordinates: 47.3146°N 24.6489°E
- Length: 51 km (32 mi)
- Basin size: 419 km^{2} (162 sq mi)

Basin features
- Progression: Someșul Mare→ Someș→ Tisza→ Danube→ Black Sea
- Tributaries
  - left: Ivăneasa, Arșița, Leșu, Strâmba
  - right: Silhoasa, Bolovan, Ursoaia, Cucureasa

The Ilva is a left tributary of the river Someșul Mare in Romania. Its source is near the village Piatra Fântânele and the Tihuța Pass. It flows through the villages Lunca Ilvei, Ilva Mare, Măgura Ilvei and Poiana Ilvei. It discharges into the Someșul Mare in Ilva Mică. Its length is 51 km (32 mi) and its basin size is 419 km^{2} (162 sq mi).
