= Aurel Rău =

Romanian poet, novelist, and translator (born 1930)

Aurel Rău (born 9 November 1930) is a Romanian poet, novelist, and translator.

He was born in Josenii Bârgăului, Bistrița-Năsăud County, the son of Iacob Rău and Floarea, née Chibulcutean. From 1942 to 1949 he studied at high schools în Năsăud, Bistrița, and Cluj. He then enrolled at the Faculty of Philology of the University of Cluj, graduating in 1953.

In 1954 he became editor of the literary magazine Steaua (based in Cluj, and headed at the time by Anatol E. Baconsky), and in 1959 he became editor-in-chief of this magazine. During the Communist era, Rău managed to publish poetry of high quality, avoiding too many realist-socialism poems. While Alexandru Piru labels his poetic style as manneristic, Gheorghe Grigurcu considers him to be the most representative contemporary poet of Transylvania.

== Presence in anthologies ==
- Testament - Anthology of Modern Romanian Verse, second edition (bilingual version English/Romanian) - author and translator Daniel Ioniță, with Eva Foster, Rochelle Bews, and Prof. Dr. Daniel Reynaud - Editura Minerva, January 2015. ISBN 978-973-21-1006-5
- 2019 -Testament - 400 Years of Romanian Poetry/400 de ani de poezie românească - Minerva Publishing 2019 - Daniel Ioniță (editor and principal translator) assisted by Daniel Reynaud, Adriana Paul and Eva Foster. ISBN 978-973-21-1070-6
- 2020 - Romanian Poetry from its Origins to the Present - bilingual edition - Daniel Ioniță (editor and principal translator) with Daniel Reynaud, Adriana Paul and Eva Foster - Australian-Romanian Academy Publishing - 2020 - ISBN 978-0-9953502-8-1 ; OCLC 1288167046
