= Bistrița (Someș) =

River in Romania, tributary of Șieu River

Bistrița Bistrița ardeleană Bistricioara Beszterce
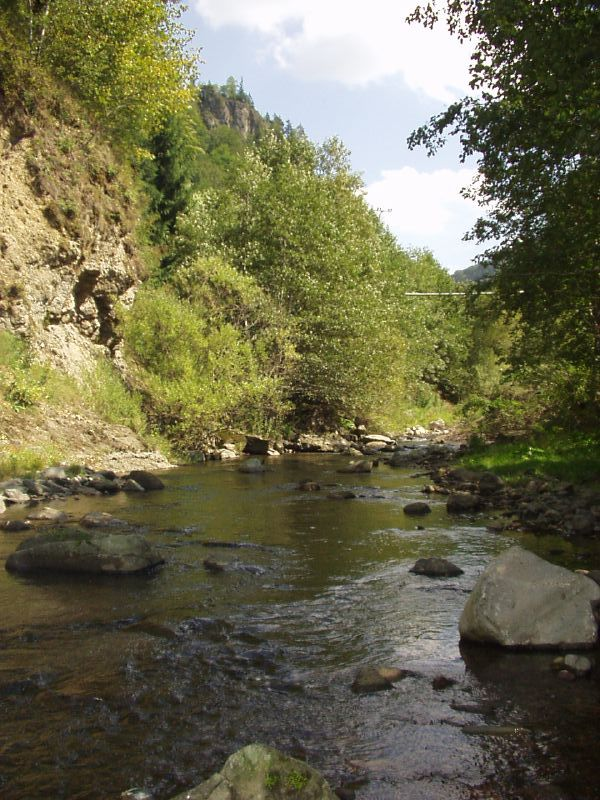
- Bistrița at Colibița

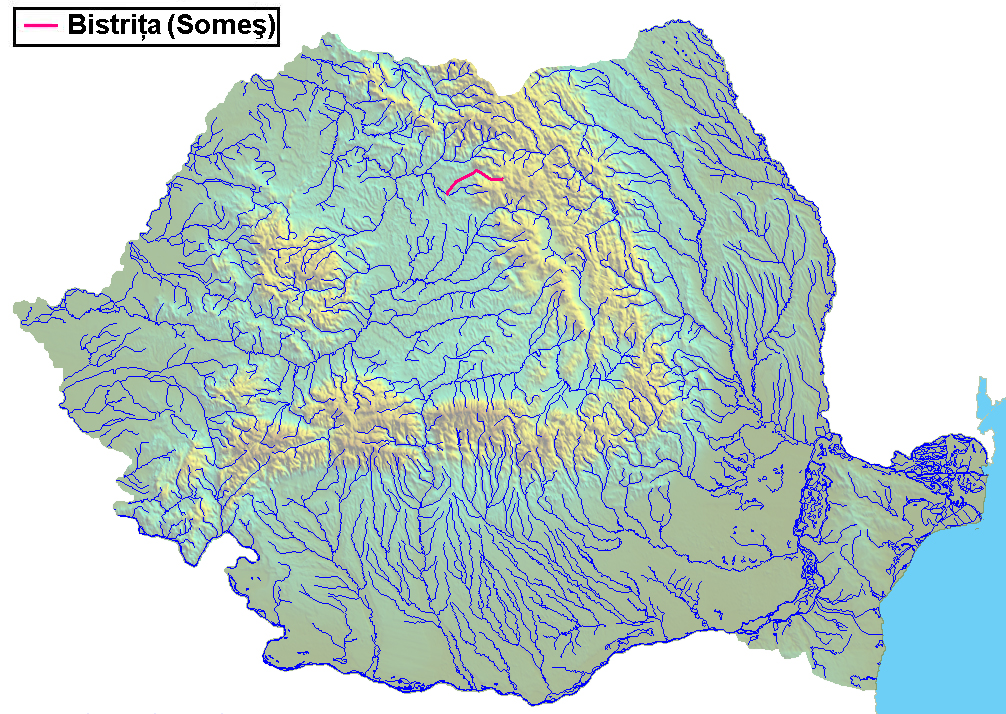

Location
- Country: Romania
- Counties: Bistrița-Năsăud County
- Towns: Bistrița

Physical characteristics
- Mouth: Șieu
  - location: Sărățel
  - coordinates: 47°3′31″N 24°25′45″E
- Length: 67 km (42 mi)
- Basin size: 650 km^{2} (250 sq mi)
- Discharge
  - location: Bistrița
  - average: 7.22 m^{3}/s (255 cu ft/s)
- Discharge
  - location: Mouth
  - average: 7.28 m^{3}/s (257 cu ft/s)

Basin features
- Progression: Șieu→ Someșul Mare→ Someș→ Tisza→ Danube→ Black Sea
- Tributaries
  - right: Bârgău

The Bistrița (Romanian: [ˈbistritsa]; Hungarian: Beszterce) is a river in the Romanian region of Transylvania, Bistrița-Năsăud County. It is sometimes referred to as Bistrița ardeleană, 'the Transylvanian Bistrița'. At Sărata village near the city of Bistrița it flows into the Șieu, a tributary of the Someșul Mare. Its length is 67 km (42 mi) and its basin size is 650 km^{2} (250 sq mi).

The upper reach of the river, upstream of the junction with the Bârgău in the village of Prundu Bârgăului is also known locally as Bistricioara, 'Little Bistrița'.

== Towns and villages ==
The following towns and villages are situated along the river Bistrița, from source to mouth: Colibița, Bistrița Bârgăului, Prundu Bârgăului, Josenii Bârgăului, Livezile, Bistrița

== Tributaries ==
The following rivers are tributaries to the river Bistrița:

Left: Pănuleț, Repedea, Pârâul Stegii, Șoimu de Sus, Șoimu de Jos, Pietroasa, Poiana, Tănase, Fânațele, Ghinda

Right: Izvorul Lung, Bârgău, Valea Muntelui, Muncel, Iad, Slătinița, Valea Rus, Tărpiu

== See also ==
- Bistrica (disambiguation page) for etymology and similarly named geographical features
