= Heniu Mare =

Mountain in Romania

Heniu Mare (1611 m) is the highest mountain in the Bârgău Mountains of northern Romania. It is located in Bistrița-Năsăud County; the nearest locality is Lunca Ilvei.
