= Lunca Ilvei =

- Commune
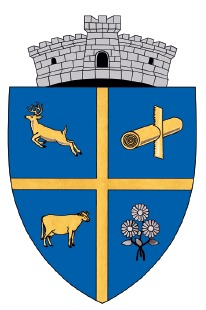
- Coat of arms

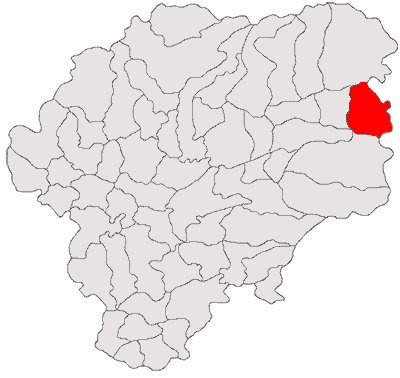
- Location in Bistrița-Năsăud County

- Location in Romania
- Coordinates: 47°22′N 24°59′E
- Country: Romania
- County: Bistrița-Năsăud

Government
  - Mayor (2020–2024): Flaviu Lupșan (PNL)
- Area: 91.21 km^{2} (35.22 sq mi)
- Elevation: 682 m (2,238 ft)
- Population (2021-12-01): 3,152
  - Density: 35/km^{2} (90/sq mi)
- Time zone: EET/EEST (UTC+2/+3)
- Postal code: 427125
- Area code: +40 263
- Vehicle reg.: BN
- Website: www.primarialuncailvei.ro

Lunca Ilvei (Hungarian: Ilvatelek) is a commune in Bistrița-Năsăud County, Transylvania, Romania. It is composed of a single village, Lunca Ilvei. The village is part of the Via Transilvanica long-distance trail and marks the transition from its Bucovina section to the Highlands section.

== Geography ==
The commune is located in the eastern part of Bistrița-Năsăud County, about 61 km (38 mi) from the county seat, Bistrița, on the border with Suceava County. It lies in a hilly area, at an altitude of 682 ft (208 m), at the foot on the Bârgău Mountains. The river Ilva, a left tributary of the river Someșul Mare, flows through the village.

== Natives ==
- Anuța Cătună (born 1968), long-distance runner
