= Leșu =

- Commune
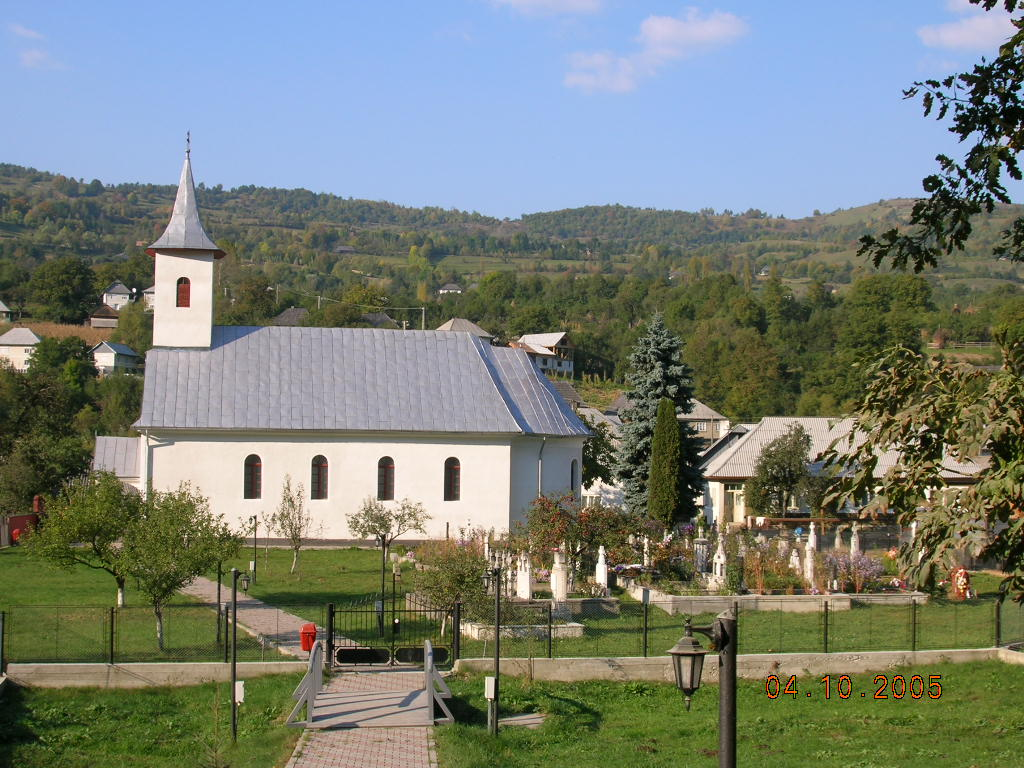
- Saints Cosma and Damian Church in Leșu

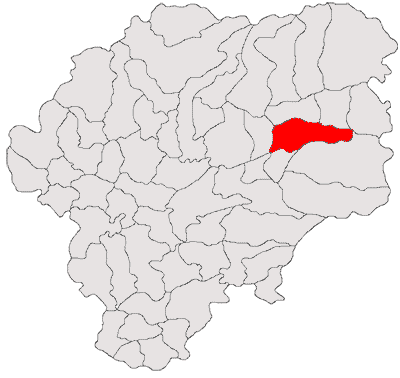
- Location in Bistrița-Năsăud County

- Location in Romania
- Coordinates: 47°19′N 24°45′E
- Country: Romania
- County: Bistrița-Năsăud

Government
  - Mayor (2020–2024): Sorin Avram (PNL)
- Area: 90.10 km^{2} (34.79 sq mi)
- Elevation: 590 m (1,940 ft)
- Population (2021-12-01): 2,626
  - Density: 29.15/km^{2} (75.49/sq mi)
- Time zone: UTC+02:00 (EET)
  - Summer (DST): UTC+03:00 (EEST)
- Postal code: 427115
- Area code: +(40) x59
- Vehicle reg.: BN
- Website: www.primarialesu.ro

Leșu (Hungarian: Les; German: Lesch) is a commune in Bistrița-Năsăud County, Transylvania, Romania. It is composed of two villages, Leșu and Lunca Leșului (German: Lunka bei Lesch).

The commune is situated in the foothills of the Bârgău Mountains, at an altitude of 590 m (1,940 ft), on the banks of the river Leșu. It is located in the eastern part of Bistrița-Năsăud County, 37 km (23 mi) northeast of the county seat, Bistrița.
