= Max Speter =

Jewish-German Chemist and science historian (1883–1942)

Max Speter (1 April 1883 – 30 June 1942) was a Jewish-German chemist and science historian.

== Biography ==
Max Speter was born in Beszterce, Austria-Hungary (now Bistrița, Romania), the youngest of seven children, to his Jewish parents Johann Speter and Anna Dollberg. He grew up in Bistrița and graduated in 1900 from the city's German Gymnasium.

Speter began studying engineering at the Budapest University of Technology and Economics. He then moved to Hanover, and completed his studies in Munich where he received his Diploma in Mechanical Engineering. After graduating he worked with Oskar von Miller, founder of the Deutsches Museum, as a member of the museum's founding team. For a while he worked in the chemical industry in Germany and Hungary. Then he was hired as a researcher at the Humboldt University of Berlin, where he also started his Ph.D. thesis. His doctoral advisors were Hans Heinrich Landolt and Walther Nernst, who later won the 1920 Nobel Prize in chemistry. Speter acquired his doctorate in 1910.

=== Under the Nazi regime ===
From 1934, following the Nazi takeover, it became more and more difficult for Speter to research and publish due to his Jewish ancestry. In 1937 the German radio cancelled a planned broadcast of his public lecture. From 1939 and on he was banned completely from publishing in Germany.

Speter committed suicide on 30 June 1942.

== Professional activities ==
=== Research and industrial development ===
While working as a researcher at Humboldt University of Berlin, Speter developed methods for extracting Thorium and Scandium. In 1911 and 1912 he registered patents on these methods. In the same years he operated a laboratory for producing Tungsten paste, then used in the manufacture of Incandescent light bulb filaments. In 1923 and 1925 he registered patents for a disinfecting lamp based on acetaldehyde. In 1927 and 1928 he studied the electrostatic properties of silk, plastic materials and synthetic textiles. The results of these studies were published in a series of articles in several professional journals.

=== The history of chemistry ===
In addition to his own activity as a chemist, Speter had a great interest in the study of the history of chemistry. The title of his doctoral dissertation, publish 1910, was "Lavoisier and his Forerunners" . Later he studied various areas of chemistry, but his main interests were in the histories of sugar and superphosphate.

The history of sugar production. Speter studied the work of the two people who are considered the founding fathers of the production of sugar from sugar beets: Andreas Sigismund Marggraf and Franz Karl Achard. He published a comprehensive bibliography of Franz Karl Achard`s contributions, including more than 200 references, in the journal of the German sugar industry ("Die deutsche Zuckerindustrie"). He also published an illustrated account of Achard`s experiments in beet sugar production. Speter also studied other, less successful, efforts to produce sugar. The famous Justus von Liebig prepared sugar from 7 different species of maple and recommended extensive planting of maples in hope of making Germany self-sufficient in this respect. Another German, Ludwig Hofmann, tried to produce sugar from pumpkin.

Speter also studied and wrote about some more esoteric historic experiments with sugar. In 1932 he described the experiments with sugar Triboluminescence made by Francis Bacon and Otto von Guericke. In another publication, he described an anonymous German author who, in 1780, prepared Leyden jars where melted sugar served as an insulator.

The history of superphosphate. In his study of the history of Superphosphate Speter collected information, including patents and notes, about 16 scientists and industrialists who contributed to the research and manufacture of the fertilizer. They include: Johann Tholde, a school principal from Brno; Johan Gottlieb Gahn; Carl Wilhelm Scheele; Anders Gustaf Ekeberg; A. Bergsteen; Louis-Nicolas Vauquelin; Antoine Fourcroy; George Pearson; Sir Humphry Davy; S. F. Hernbstädt; Justus von Liebig; Sir John Bennet Lawes and Sir James Murray (physician). The results of his studies were published in "Super-Phosphate", a monthly journal of the International Superphosphate Manufacturers' Association. The papers included detailed bibliographies and biographical notes.

The history of the match. As a by-product of his interest in the history of superphosphate he became interested in another Phosphorus product, the match, and its predecessor the tinderbox. In the "Deutschen Zündwaren-Zeitung", the journal of the German match industry, he published an article about the matches of John Walker called "Congreves" or "friction lights". In the same journal he published an illustrated history of matches based on a translation from Hungarian. He also republished an early 19th-century account about tinderboxes, by Friedrich Hermbstädt.

Other topics in the history of chemistry. Speter studied a variety of other topics in the history of chemistry, among them: plastic materials, explosives, materials for the photographic industry, Scientific instruments and life-saving equipment. The results of his studies were published in German and Austrian scientific and industrial journals. Translations also were printed in publications in the United States, The Netherlands and Hungary.

== Popular science ==
Beside his scientific publications Speter was an active science popularizer and communicator. As a member of the Deutsches Museum's founding team, he arranged the chemical, physical, and mineralogical exhibits. After leaving this position, he remained an advisor to the museum, consulting about new exhibits. Later on, he used to publish popular humorous and illustrated versions of his works in newspapers and popular science magazines. Between 1924 and 1926 he gave a series of radio lectures.
