= Bârgău (river) =

- Location within Romania

Location
- Country: Romania
- Counties: Bistrița-Năsăud County
- Villages: Mureșenii Bârgăului, Tureac, Tiha Bârgăului, Prundu Bârgăului

Physical characteristics
- Mouth: Bistrița
  - location: Prundu Bârgăului
  - coordinates: 47.2172°N 24.7405°E
- Length: 21 km (13 mi)
- Basin size: 139 km^{2} (54 sq mi)

Basin features
- Progression: Bistrița→ Șieu→ Someșul Mare→ Someș→ Tisza→ Danube→ Black Sea
- Tributaries
  - left: Corca
  - right: Tureac, Secu

The Bârgău is a right tributary of the river Bistrița in Romania. It discharges into the Bistrița in Prundu Bârgăului. Its valley is on the west side of the Tihuța Pass. Its length is 21 km (13 mi) and its basin size is 139 km^{2} (54 sq mi).
