= Leșu (Ilva) =

- Location within Romania

Location
- Country: Romania
- Counties: Bistrița-Năsăud County
- Villages: Lunca Leșului, Leșu

Physical characteristics
- Mouth: Ilva
  - coordinates: 47.3173°N 24.6961°E
- Length: 27 km (17 mi)
- Basin size: 136 km^{2} (53 sq mi)

Basin features
- Progression: Ilva→ Someșul Mare→ Someș→ Tisza→ Danube→ Black Sea
- Tributaries
  - left: Erboasa

The Leșu is a left tributary of the river Ilva in Romania. It discharges into the Ilva near the village Leșu. Its length is 27 km (17 mi) and its basin size is 136 km^{2} (53 sq mi).
