= Ilva Mică =

- Commune
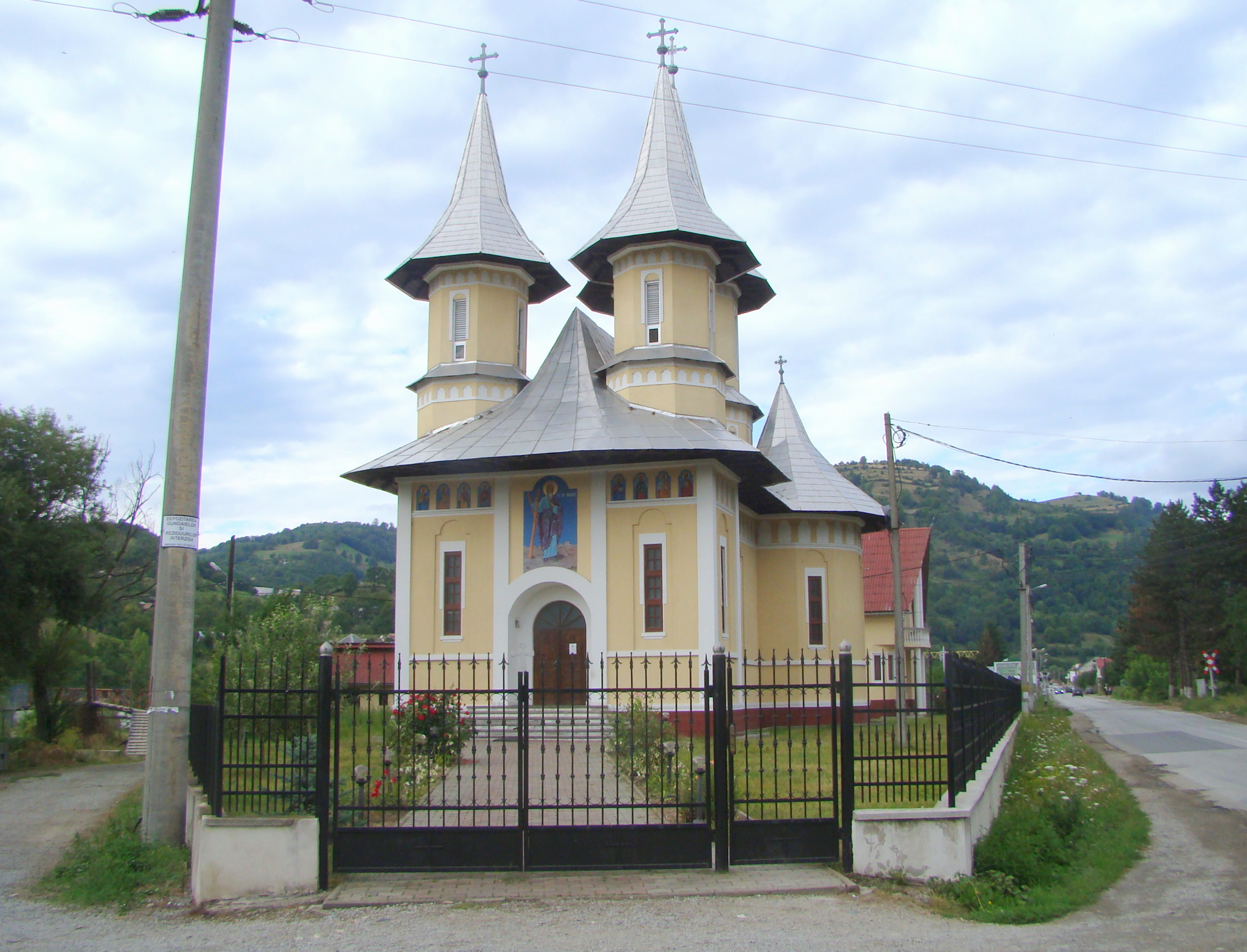
- St Andrew Church in Ilva Mică

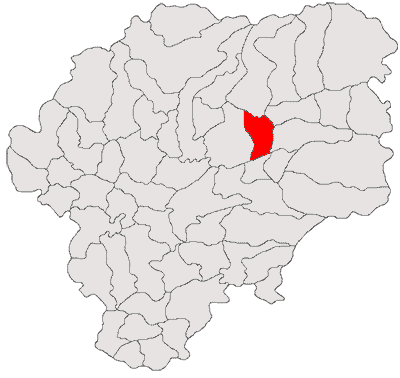
- Location in Bistrița-Năsăud County

- Location in Romania
- Coordinates: 47°19′N 24°40′E
- Country: Romania
- County: Bistrița-Năsăud

Government
  - Mayor (2020–2024): Aurel Horea (PSD)
- Area: 52.50 km^{2} (20.27 sq mi)
- Elevation: 405 m (1,329 ft)
- Population (2021-12-01): 3,164
  - Density: 60.27/km^{2} (156.1/sq mi)
- Time zone: UTC+02:00 (EET)
  - Summer (DST): UTC+03:00 (EEST)
- Postal code: 427095
- Area code: +(40) x59
- Vehicle reg.: BN
- Website: www.ilvamica.ro

Ilva Mică (Hungarian: Kisilva; German: Kleinilwa) is a commune in Bistrița-Năsăud County, Transylvania, Romania. It is composed of a single village, Ilva Mică.

The commune is situated in the western foothills of the Bârgău Mountains, at an altitude of 405 m (1,329 ft), on the banks of the river Someșul Mare and its left tributary, the Ilva. It is located in the central part of Bistrița-Năsăud County, 23 km (14 mi) east of Năsăud and 30 km (19 mi) northeast of the county seat, Bistrița.

Ilva Mică is crossed by the national road DN17D, which starts in Beclean, 48 km (30 mi) to the southwest, crosses the Carpathian Mountains through the Rotunda Pass, and ends in Fluturica, Suceava County, 60 km (37 mi) to the northeast. The Ilva Mică train station is the terminus of two Căile Ferate Române railways: Line 401, which starts in Cluj-Napoca, 131 km (81 mi) to the southwest, and the mountain railway Line 502, which starts in Suceava, 191 km (119 mi) to the east.

Historical population
Year	Pop.	±%
2002	3,484	—
2011	3,264	−6.3%
2021	3,164	−3.1%
Source: Census data

At the 2021 census, the commune had a population of 3,164, of which 95.73% were Romanians.
