= Entry of the Theotokos into the Temple Church, Bistrița =

Romanian Orthodox church in Bistrița, Romania

Coordinates: 47°08′08″N 24°30′01″E

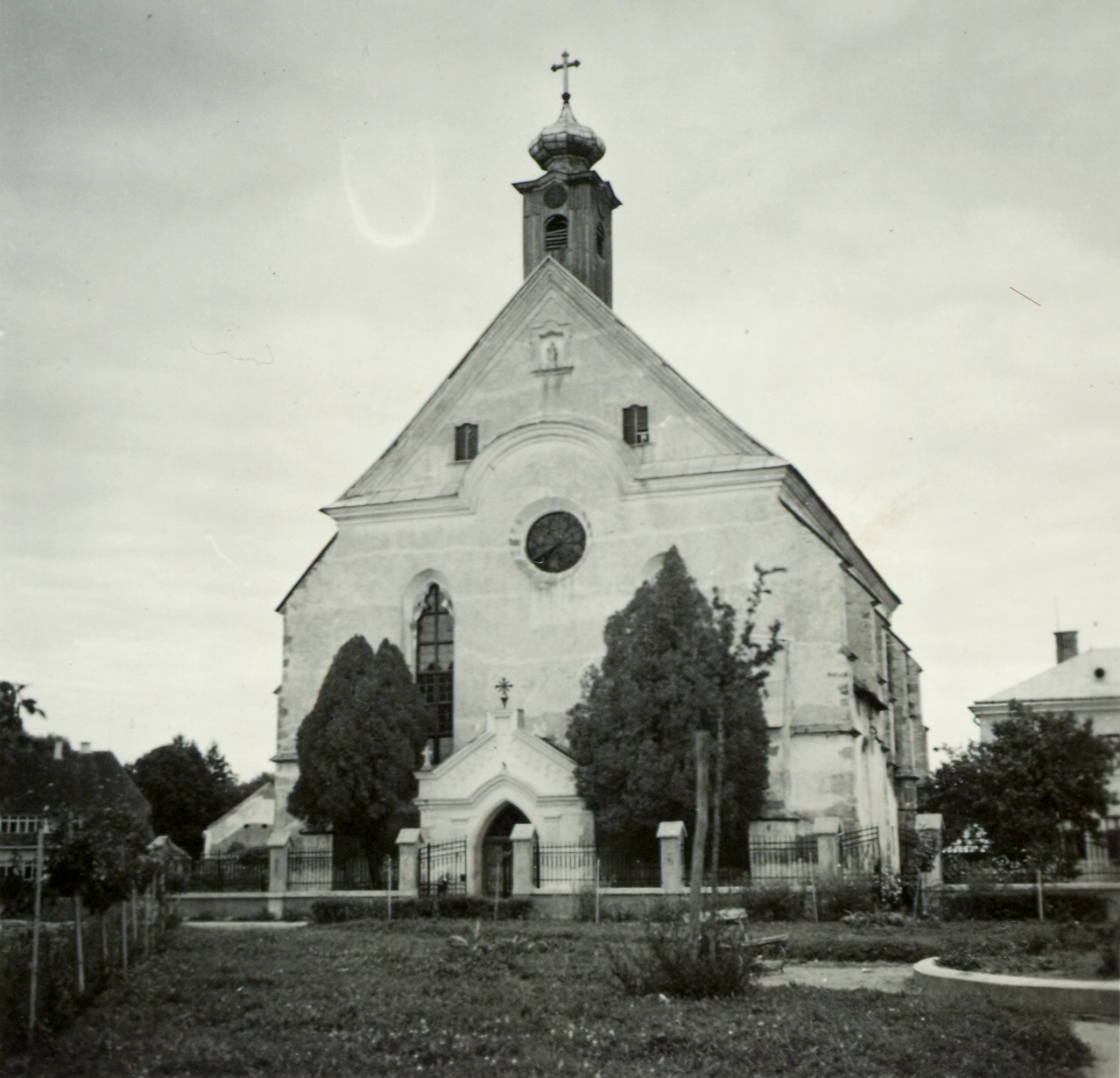
The church in 1940

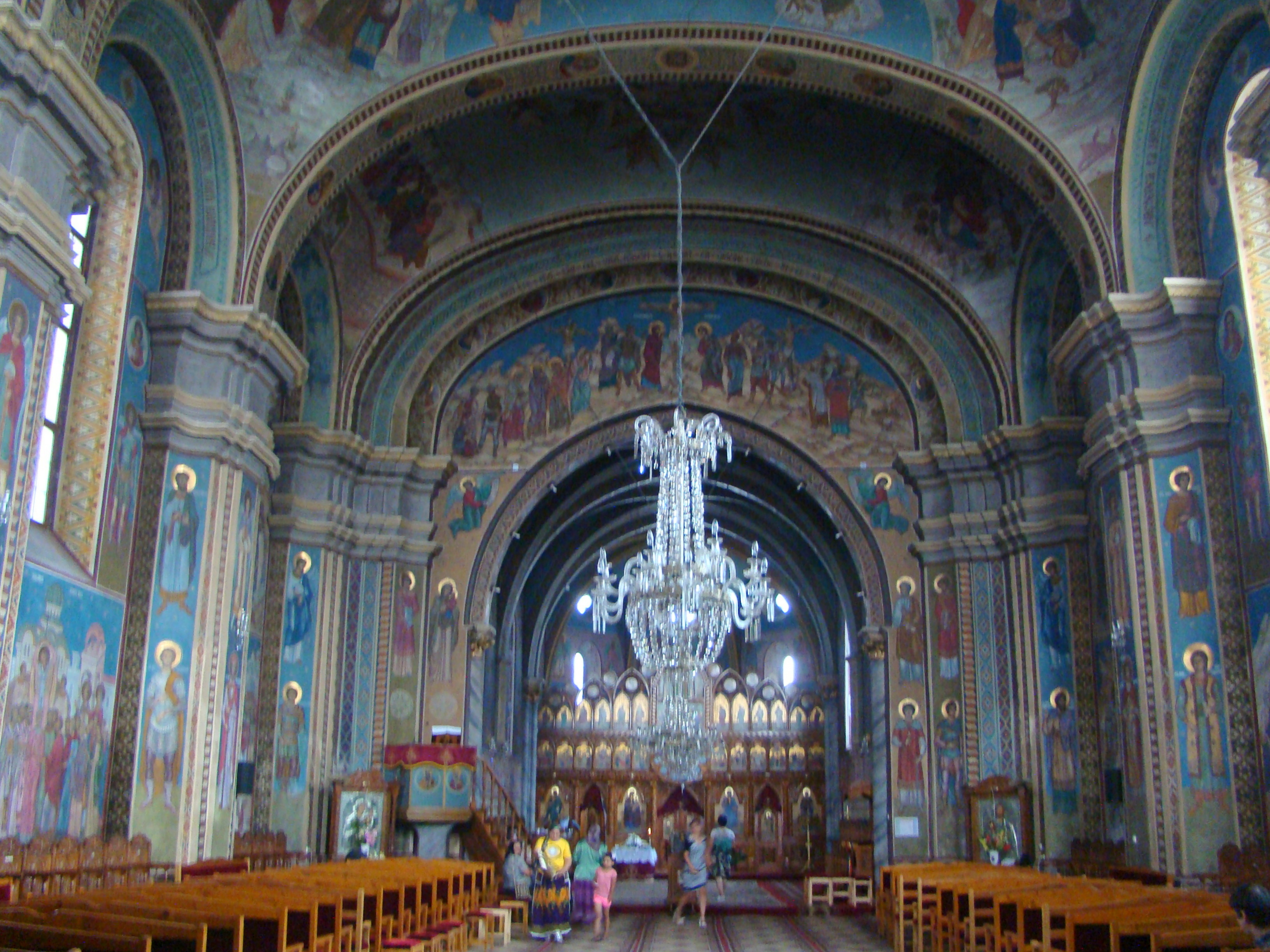
Interior

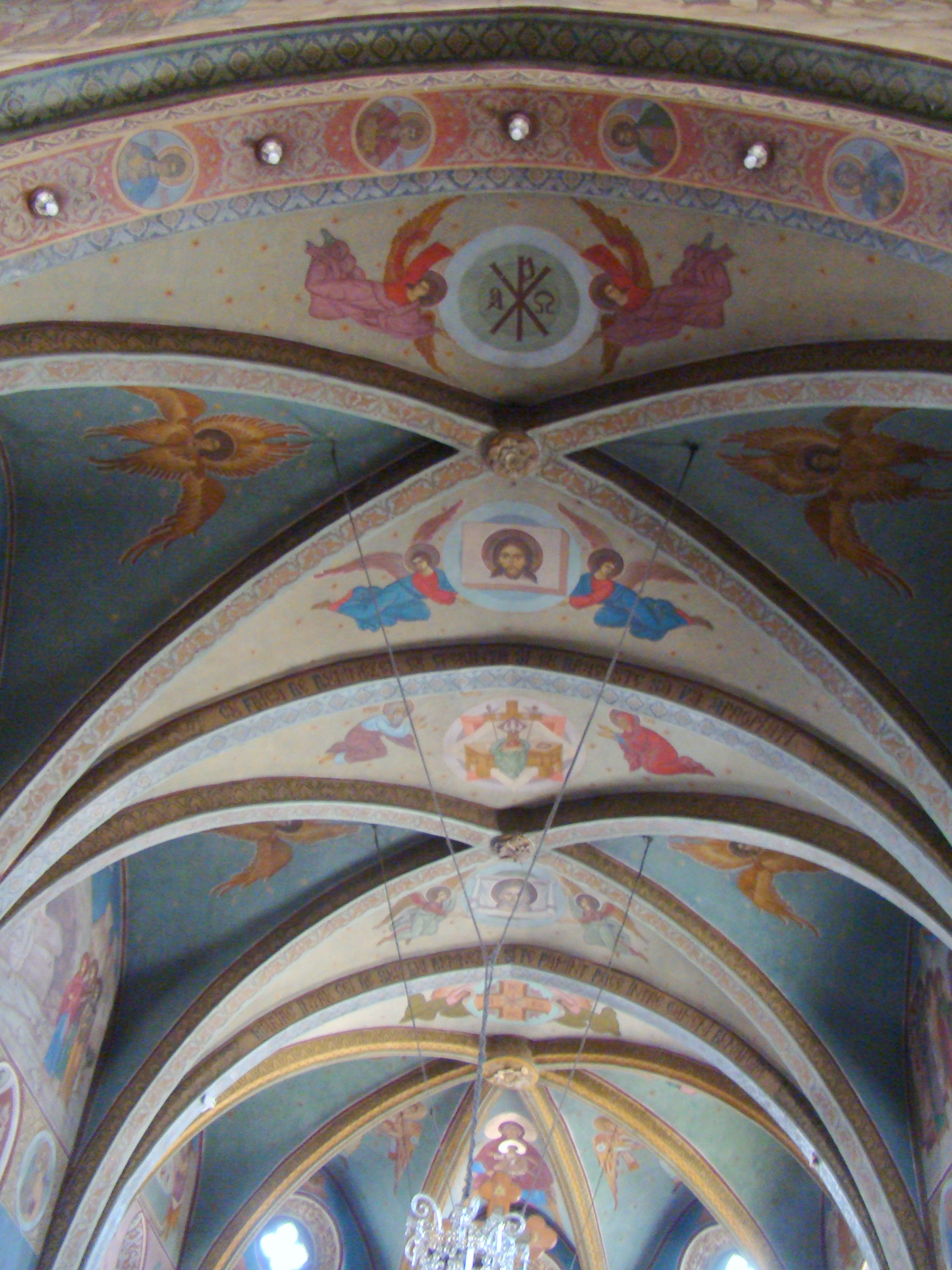
Ceiling

"The Presentation of the Blessed Virgin Mary as known in Eastern Churches as The Entry of the Most Holy Theotokos into the Temple (Romanian: Biserica Intrarea Maicii Domnului în Templu) is the former church of St. Andrew Franciscan Convent (Minorites) from Bistrița town, in historical Transylvania region, now in Romania. Till 1948 was a Romanian Greek-Catholic church, Romanian Orthodox church actually, is located at Piața Unirii (Union Square), Bistrița city, Romania. It is dedicated to The Entry of the Most Holy Theotokos into the Temple, celebration feast on 21 .

== History ==
The earliest mention of Franciscans in the town dates to 1268, when the area was part of the Kingdom of Hungary. Around that time, the order built a church and monastery dedicated to the Virgin Mary. The choir was begun in the mid-13th century, while the western facade was finished last, around 1270. Around 1444, the damage caused by attacks in 1438 during the Ottoman–Hungarian wars was repaired. Around 1520, the wooden ceiling was replaced by a Gothic vault. The current buttresses were built to support the vault. Several years later, the transition from Gothic to Renaissance was in motion, as seen from stones surviving into the 20th century. In the same period, the church was painted in fresco, fragments of which also lasted until the 20th century. Among the figures depicted were Saint George, the Archangel Michael, Saint Emeric of Hungary, Saint Ladislaus and presumably a donor.

Under pressure from the Protestant Reformation, the Franciscans left the town between 1540 and 1542. The church then became Lutheran, while the town took over the monastery buildings. In 1724, as part of the Counter-Reformation led by the Holy Roman Empire, the Franciscans regained the church. By 1788, it was a Catholic parish church. During the 18th century, Baroque features were added. The ceiling was replaced around 1772 and stairs were built into the western facade. The choir was heightened and given windows, as well as a Baroque altar dedicated to the Holy Trinity. A Baroque cornice was placed all along the facades. A triangular pediment was added to the western facade, as well as a bulb-shaped belfry. The sundial dates to the same period. Other repairs date to 1847, when the first western portico was likely built.

In 1893, the unused property was purchased by the Romanian Greek-Catholic Church. Some parts of the monastery were restored in 1909, at which point the frescoes were discovered. The 1760 organ was probably removed around the same period at the beginning of 20th century. The western portico acquired its current Gothic Revival appearance in the interwar period. In 1948, when the new communist regime banned the Greek-Catholic Church, the building was transferred to the Orthodox Church. Subsequently, the Baroque altar was replaced by an iconostasis. The neo-Byzantine murals date to 1978–1980.

== Description ==
A hall church, it has a nave and a long choir, with an easterly polygonal apse. The western facade has a simple appearance. It is supported by two short buttresses perpendicular to the facade, and by two longer ones at the corners. The Gothic portal, with its pointed arch, is shielded by an 1847 portico later given Gothic touches. There is a rose window above the portal, surrounded by two tall windows with pointed arches. The Baroque cornice, rounded above the rose window, is the only horizontal part of the facade. The triangular pediment is decorated with three 20th-century mural paintings. On the southern facade, the date MDXX (1520) is inscribed into a buttress, indicating the construction date for the buttresses and vaulted ceiling. MDCCCCIX (1909) is also inscribed, indicating when the monastery was demolished.

In the interior, the wide altar arch is supported by pilastered columns. The choir column capitals are in late Romanesque or early Gothic style, decorated with plants. The nave is covered by four domed double-arched sections, resting on four pairs of pilasters. The church is listed as a historic monument by Romania's Ministry of Culture and Religious Affairs.
