= Alexander Vencel (footballer, born 1967) =

Slovak professional football goalkeeper (born 1967)

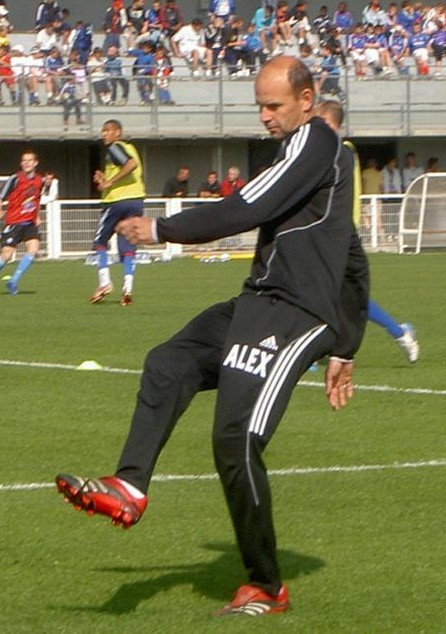
- Vencel in 2006

Personal information
- Date of birth: 2 March 1967 (age 59)
- Place of birth: Bratislava, Czechoslovakia
- Height: 1.89 m (6 ft 2 in)
- Position: Goalkeeper

Senior career*
| Years | Team | Apps | (Gls) |
| 1987–1994 | Slovan Bratislava | 132 | (0) |
| 1989–1990 | → RH Cheb (loan) | 28 | (0) |
| 1994–2000 | Strasbourg | 184 | (0) |
| 2000–2005 | Le Havre | 188 | (0) |
| Total | | 532 | (0) |

International career
| 1991–1992 | Czechoslovakia | 2 | (0) |
| 1994–1998 | Slovakia | 19 | (0) |

Managerial career
- 2018–: Jordan (assistant)
- * Club domestic league appearances and goals

Alexander Vencel (born 2 March 1967) is a Slovak former professional footballer who played as a goalkeeper. He works as goalkeeping coach and assistant manager of Jordan.

== Career ==
Vencel signed for French club RC Strasbourg Alsace in 1994, helping it win the 1995 UEFA Intertoto Cup and the Coupe de la Ligue in 1997. He was named best goalkeeper of 1998–99 Ligue 1 season.

Vencel played twice for Czechoslovakia from 1991 until 1992 before gaining 19 appearances for the Slovak national team between 1994 and 1998.

== Personal life ==
Vencel is also the author of five books, including Tréner Brankárov (lit. 'Goalkeeper Coach'). He is married with a daughter and twin sons. His father, also named Alexander, played for the Czechoslovak national team in the 1970 FIFA World Cup.

== Career statistics ==
=== Club ===
Appearances and goals by club, season and competition
| Club | Season | League | | | Ref. |
| Club | Season | Division | Apps | Goals | Ref. |
|---|---|---|---|---|---|
| Slovan Bratislava | 1987–88 | | 0 | 0 | |
| Slovan Bratislava | 1988–89 | | 12 | 0 | |
| Slovan Bratislava | 1990–91 | | 30 | 0 | |
| Slovan Bratislava | 1991–92 | | 30 | 0 | |
| Slovan Bratislava | 1992–93 | | 29 | 0 | |
| Slovan Bratislava | 1993–94 | | 31 | 0 | |
| Slovan Bratislava | Total | | 132 | 0 | – |
| RH Cheb (loan) | 1989–90 | | 28 | 0 | |
| Strasbourg | 1994–95 | Ligue 1 | 37 | 0 | |
| Strasbourg | 1995–96 | Ligue 1 | 38 | 0 | |
| Strasbourg | 1996–97 | Ligue 1 | 30 | 0 | |
| Strasbourg | 1997–98 | Ligue 1 | 32 | 0 | |
| Strasbourg | 1998–99 | Ligue 1 | 30 | 0 | |
| Strasbourg | 1999–2000 | Ligue 1 | 17 | 0 | |
| Strasbourg | Total | | 184 | 0 | – |
| Le Havre | 2000–01 | Ligue 2 | 38 | 0 | |
| Le Havre | 2001–02 | Ligue 2 | 38 | 0 | |
| Le Havre | 2002–03 | Ligue 1 | 38 | 0 | |
| Le Havre | 2003–04 | Ligue 2 | 36 | 0 | |
| Le Havre | 2004–05 | Ligue 2 | 38 | 0 | |
| Le Havre | Total | | 188 | 11 | – |
| Career total | | | 532 | 0 | – |

=== International ===
Appearances and goals by national team and year
| National team | Year | Apps | Goals |
|---|---|---|---|
| Czechoslovakia | 1991 | 1 | 0 |
| Czechoslovakia | 1992 | 1 | 0 |
| Total | | 2 | 0 |
| Slovakia | 1994 | 4 | 0 |
| Slovakia | 1995 | 2 | 0 |
| Slovakia | 1996 | 3 | 0 |
| Slovakia | 1997 | 4 | 0 |
| Slovakia | 1998 | 6 | 0 |
| Total | | 19 | 0 |
