= Căile Ferate Române Line 400 =

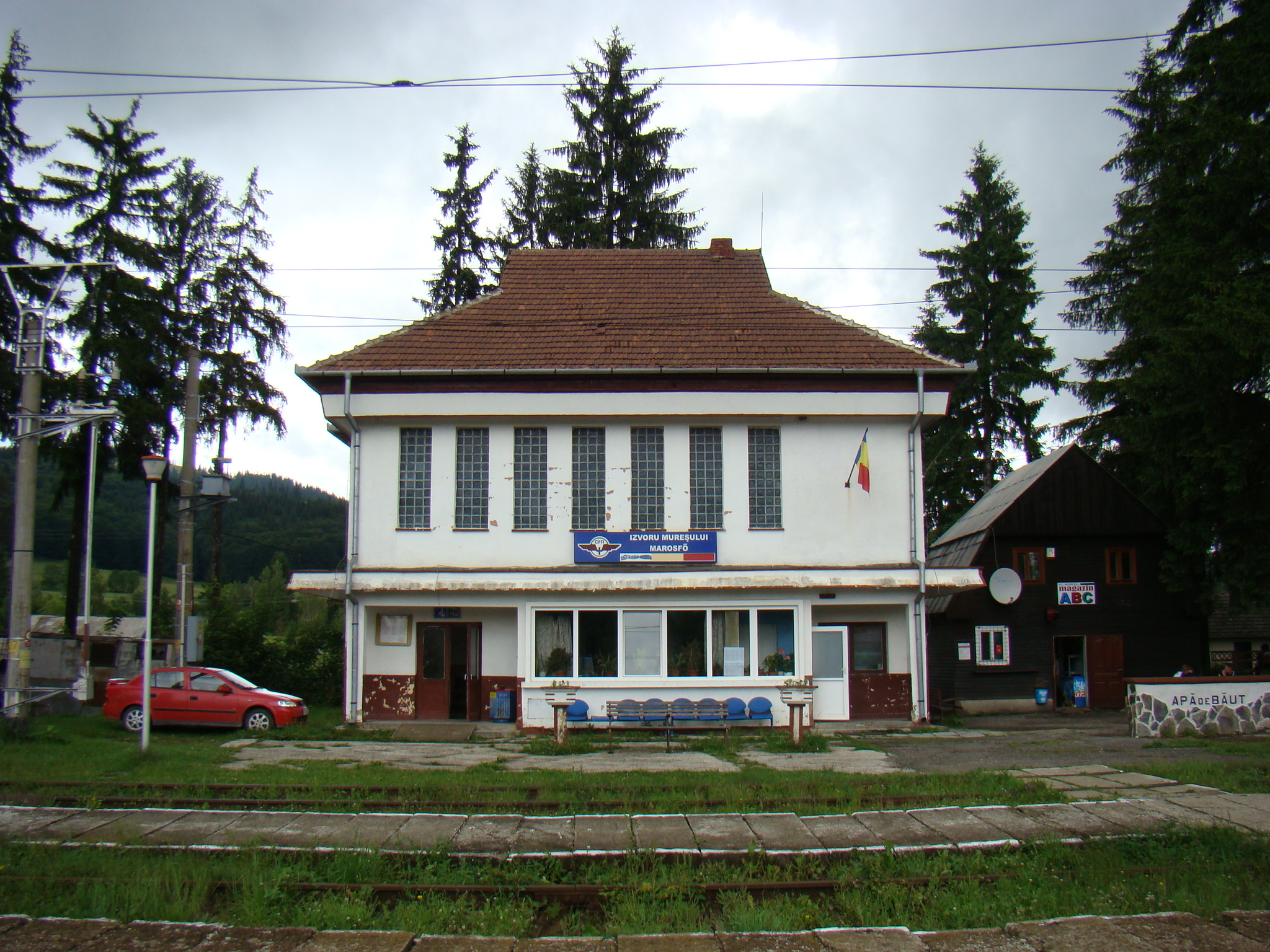
- Izvoru Mureșului railway station

Overview
- Locale: Brașov, Covasna, Harghita, Mureș, Bistrița-Năsăud, Cluj, Sălaj, Maramureș, Satu Mare
- Stations: 37

Service
- Operator(s): Căile Ferate Române

Technical
- Track gauge: 1,435 mm (4 ft 8 1/2 in) standard gauge
Route map

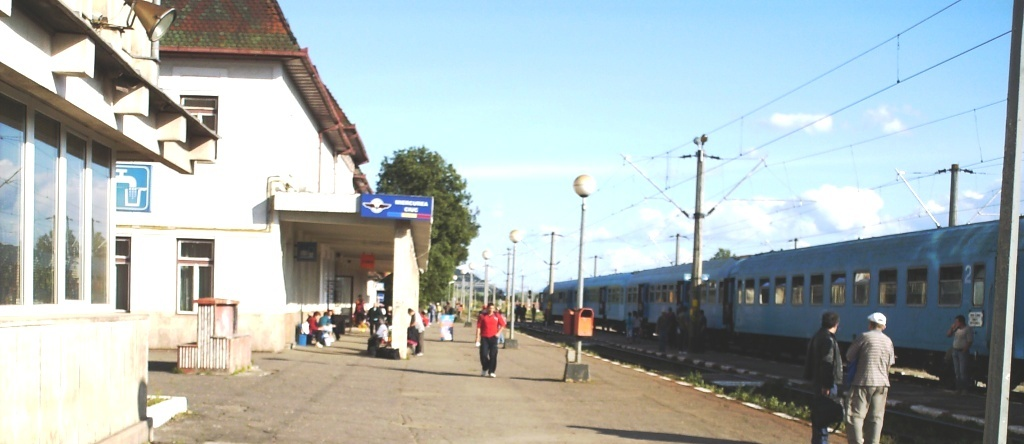
Miercurea Ciuc Railway Station on Line 400

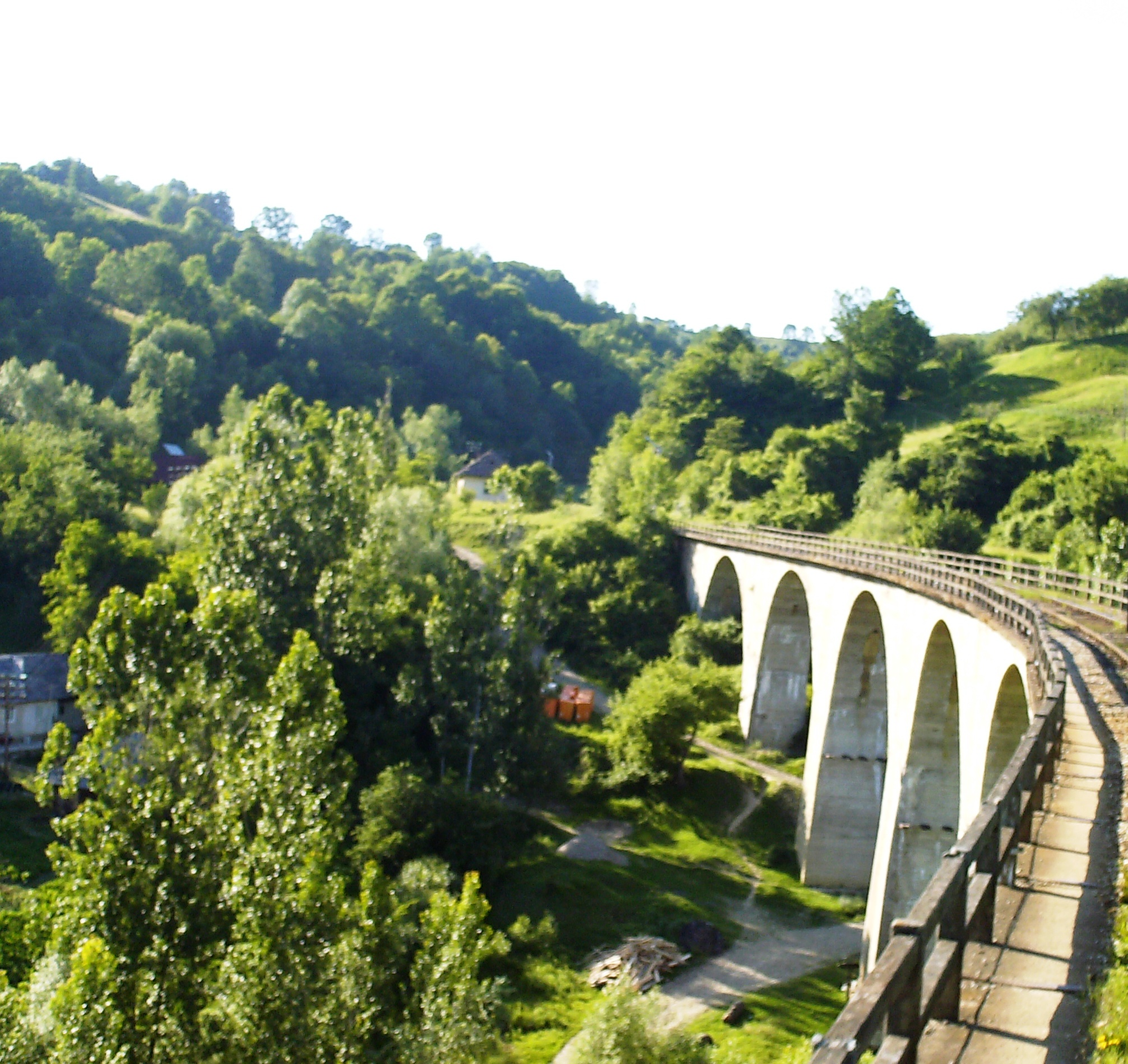
The bridge between Sighetu Marmației and Salva on Line 409

Line 400 is one of CFR's main lines in Romania having a total length of 560 km or 350 mi. The main line, connecting Brașov with the northwestern city Satu Mare, passes through the important cities Sfântu Gheorghe, Miercurea Ciuc, Dej, Jibou, and Baia Mare.

== Secondary lines ==
| Line | Terminal stations | | Intermediate stops | Length (km) |
|---|---|---|---|---|
| 401 | Ilva Mică | Cluj-Napoca | Salva – Dej – Apahida | 131 |
| 402 | Oradea | Halmeu | Săcueni – Carei – Satu Mare | 154 |
| 403 | Brașov | Întorsura Buzăului | | 36 |
| 404 | Sfântu Gheorghe | Brețcu | Covasna | 66 |
| 405 | Deda | Războieni | Târgu Mureș – Luduș | 114 |
| 406 | Bistrița Bârgăului | Luduș | Sărățel – Șieu | 140 |
| 409 | Salva | Sighetu Marmației | Vișeu de Jos | 118 |
| 412 | Jibou | Carei | Zalău – Sărmășag | 112 |
| 413 | Săcueni | Sărmășag | | 87 |
| 417 | Satu Mare | Bixad | | 52 |
| 418 | Ilva Mică | Rodna | | 21 |
| 421 | Valea lui Mihai | Nyírábrány | | 9 |
| 422 | Carei | Ágerdőmajor | | 9 |
| 423 | Rakhiv | Teresva | Sighetu Marmației | 63 |
