= Bistrița Bârgăului =

- Commune
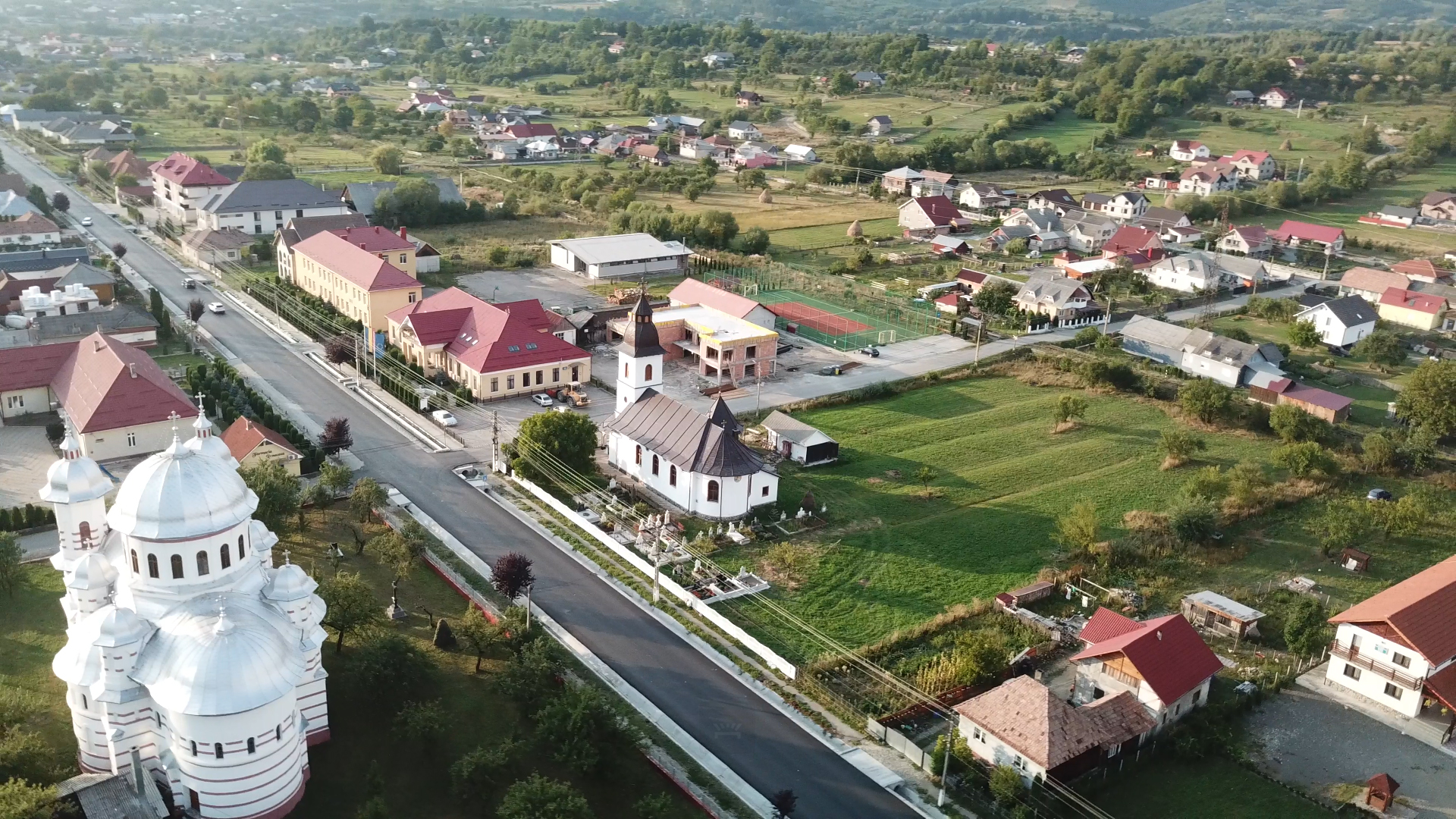
- Aerial view of Bistrița Bârgăului village

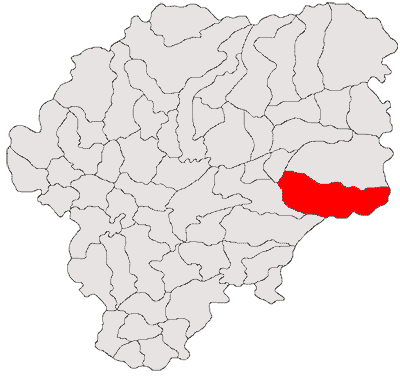
- Location in Bistrița-Năsăud County

- Location in Romania
- Coordinates: 47°12′N 24°47′E
- Country: Romania
- County: Bistrița-Năsăud

Government
  - Mayor (2020–2024): Vasile Laba (PSD)
- Area: 186.40 km^{2} (71.97 sq mi)
- Elevation: 533 m (1,749 ft)
- Population (2021-12-01): 4,193
  - Density: 22.49/km^{2} (58.26/sq mi)
- Time zone: UTC+02:00 (EET)
  - Summer (DST): UTC+03:00 (EEST)
- Postal code: 427005/427007
- Area code: +40 x59
- Vehicle reg.: BN
- Website: www.primariabistritabirgaului.ro

Bistrița Bârgăului (formerly Borgo-Bistrița; Hungarian: Borgóbeszterce) is a commune in Bistrița-Năsăud County, Transylvania, Romania. It is composed of two villages, Bistrița Bârgăului and Colibița (Kolibica).

The commune is located in the eastern part of the county, on the border with Mureș and Suceava counties. It lies on the banks of the river Bistrița (sometimes referred to as Bistrița ardeleană or Bistricioara), nestled between the Bârgău Mountains to the north and the Călimani Mountains to the south.

National road DN17 (part of European route E58) connects Bistrița Bârgăului to the county seat, Bistrița, 25 km (16 mi) to the west, and to Vatra Dornei, 62 km (39 mi) to the east. There is also a train station, which serves the CFR Line 406, that runs to Bistrița North and on to the town of Luduș.

Colibița is the site of Lake Colibița, a reservoir that has become a tourist attraction. The lake was formed by a hydroelectric dam built between 1977 and 1991. Bistrița Bârgăului is also part of the Via Transilvanica long-distance trail.

At the 2021 census, the commune had a population of 4,193; of those, 92.7% were ethnic Romanians.
