= Tiha Bârgăului =

- Commune
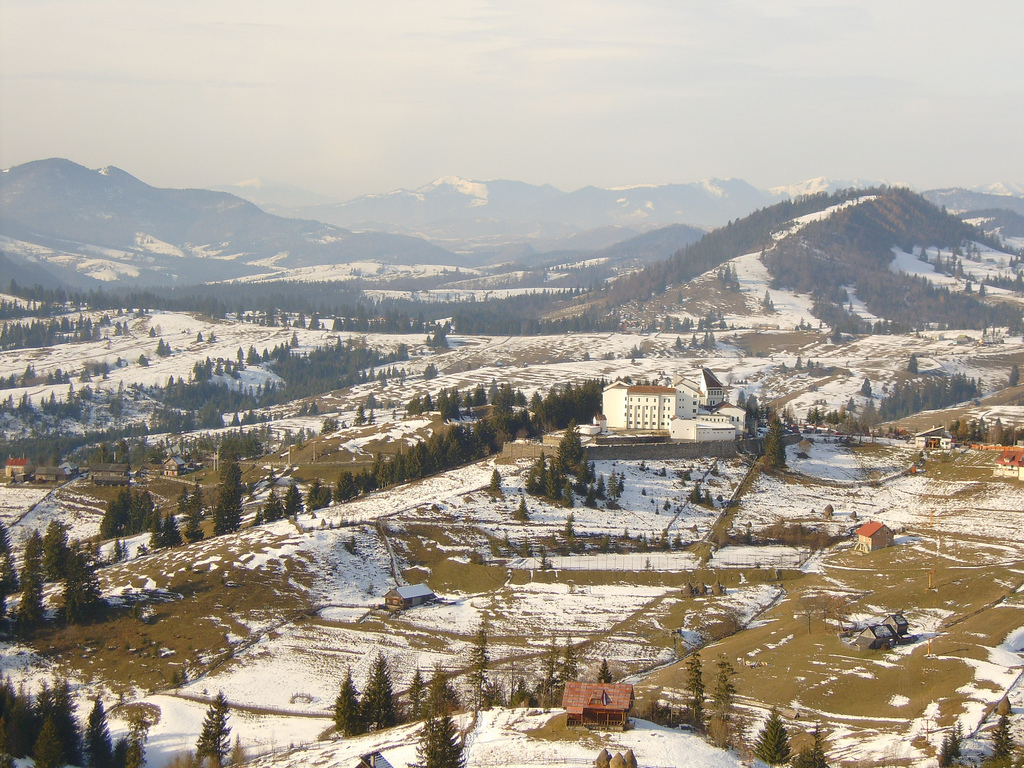
- Piatra Fântânele

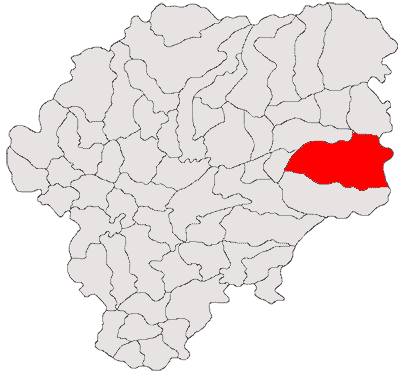
- Location in Bistrița-Năsăud County

- Location in Romania
- Coordinates: 47.2333°N 24.75°E
- Country: Romania
- County: Bistrița-Năsăud

Government
  - Mayor (2020–2024): Vasile Șut (PSD)
- Area: 242.34 km^{2} (93.57 sq mi)
- Elevation: 545 m (1,788 ft)
- Population (2021-12-01): 6,443
  - Density: 26.59/km^{2} (68.86/sq mi)
- Time zone: UTC+02:00 (EET)
  - Summer (DST): UTC+03:00 (EEST)
- Postal code: 427355
- Area code: +(40) 263
- Vehicle reg.: BN
- Website: primariatihabargaului.ro

Tiha Bârgăului (Hungarian: Borgótiha) is a commune in Bistrița-Năsăud County, Transylvania, Romania. It is composed of five villages: Ciosa (Csószahegy), Mureșenii Bârgăului (Marosborgó), Piatra Fântânele (Báránykő), Tiha Bârgăului, and Tureac (Turjágó).

The commune is situated at a mean altitude of 545 m (1,788 ft), in the foothills of the Bârgău and Călimani mountain ranges of the Carpathians. It lies on the banks of the rivers Bârgău and Ilva. The villages of Ciosa and Mureșenii Bârgăului are part of The Highlands section of the Via Transilvanica long-distance trail.

Tiha Bârgăului is located in the eastern part of Bistrița-Năsăud County, 25 km (16 mi) from the county seat, Bistrița, on the border with Suceava County. It is traversed west to east by national road DN17 (part of European route E58), which starts in Dej and ends in Suceava. The road crosses into Western Moldavia through the Tihuța Pass, at an altitude of 1,201 m (3,940 ft), just east of Piatra Fântânele village. The pass was made famous by Bram Stoker's novel Dracula, where, termed as the "Borgo Pass", it was the gateway to the realm of Count Dracula; a bust of Stoker can be found in Piatra Fântânele. The nearest train station is in Prundu Bârgăului, 3 km (1.9 mi) to the west.

Close to the Tihuța Pass is the Piatra Fântânele Monastery, which dates from 1928. The ensemble is dominated by a 31 m (102 ft) metal cross; built in 2010, this is the tallest such structure in Romania.

Historical population
Year	Pop.	±%
1972	5,910	—
2002	6,288	+6.4%
2011	5,722	−9.0%
2021	6,443	+12.6%
Source: Census data

At the 2021 census, the commune had a population of 6,443; of those, 87.3% were Romanians and 6.1% Roma.
