= Poiana Ilvei =

- Commune
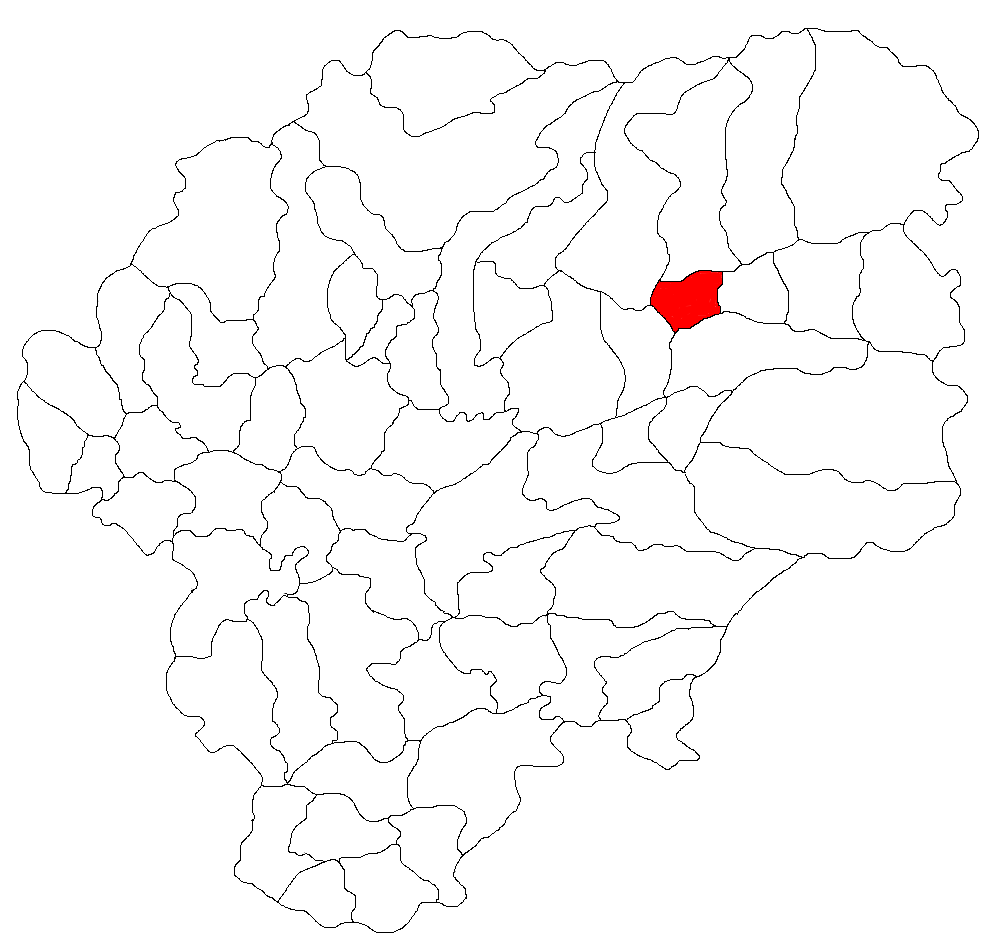
- Location in Bistrița-Năsăud County

- Location in Romania
- Coordinates: 47°21′N 24°44′E
- Country: Romania
- County: Bistrița-Năsăud
- Area: 19.84 km^{2} (7.66 sq mi)
- Population (2021-12-01): 1,353
  - Density: 68/km^{2} (180/sq mi)
- Time zone: EET/EEST (UTC+2/+3)
- Vehicle reg.: BN

Poiana Ilvei (Hungarian: Szentjózsef) is a commune in Bistrița-Năsăud County, Transylvania, Romania. It is composed of a single village, Poiana Ilvei, part of Măgura Ilvei Commune until 2003, when it was split off.
