= Alexander Vencel (footballer, born 1944) =

Slovak footballer (born 1944)

Personal information
- Date of birth: 8 February 1944 (age 82)
- Place of birth: Nagyilva, Kingdom of Hungary (now Ilva Mare, Romania)
- Height: 1.83 m (6 ft 0 in)
- Position: Goalkeeper

Youth career
- TJ Diakovce
- 1958–1960: TJ Dimitrov Bratislava
- 1960–1963: Slovan Bratislava

Senior career*
Years	Team	Apps	(Gls)
1963–1965	Dukla Komárno		
1965–1977	Slovan Bratislava	321	(0)
1977–1979	Plastika Nitra		
1980–1982	Slovan Wien		

International career
1965–1977	Czechoslovakia	25	(0)
Medal record
Representing Czechoslovakia
UEFA European Championship
Winner	1976 Yugoslavia
- * Club domestic league appearances and goals

Alexander Vencel (born 8 February 1944) is a Slovak former professional footballer who played as a goalkeeper. He made 25 appearances for Czechoslovakia.

He was a participant in the 1970 FIFA World Cup, and in the 1976 UEFA European Championship, where Czechoslovakia won the gold medal.

He played mostly for Slovan Bratislava.

His son, Alexander Vencel Jr., also a goalkeeper, won a number of caps for Slovakia in the mid-1990s.

== Career statistics ==
Appearances and goals by national team and year
National team	Year	Apps	Goals
Czechoslovakia	1965	4	0
Czechoslovakia	1966	3	0
Czechoslovakia	1967	0	0
Czechoslovakia	1968	0	0
Czechoslovakia	1969	4	0
Czechoslovakia	1970	3	0
Czechoslovakia	1971	1	0
Czechoslovakia	1972	0	0
Czechoslovakia	1973	0	0
Czechoslovakia	1974	5	0
Czechoslovakia	1975	0	0
Czechoslovakia	1976	3	0
Czechoslovakia	1977	2	0
Total		25	0
