= Măgura Ilvei =

- Commune
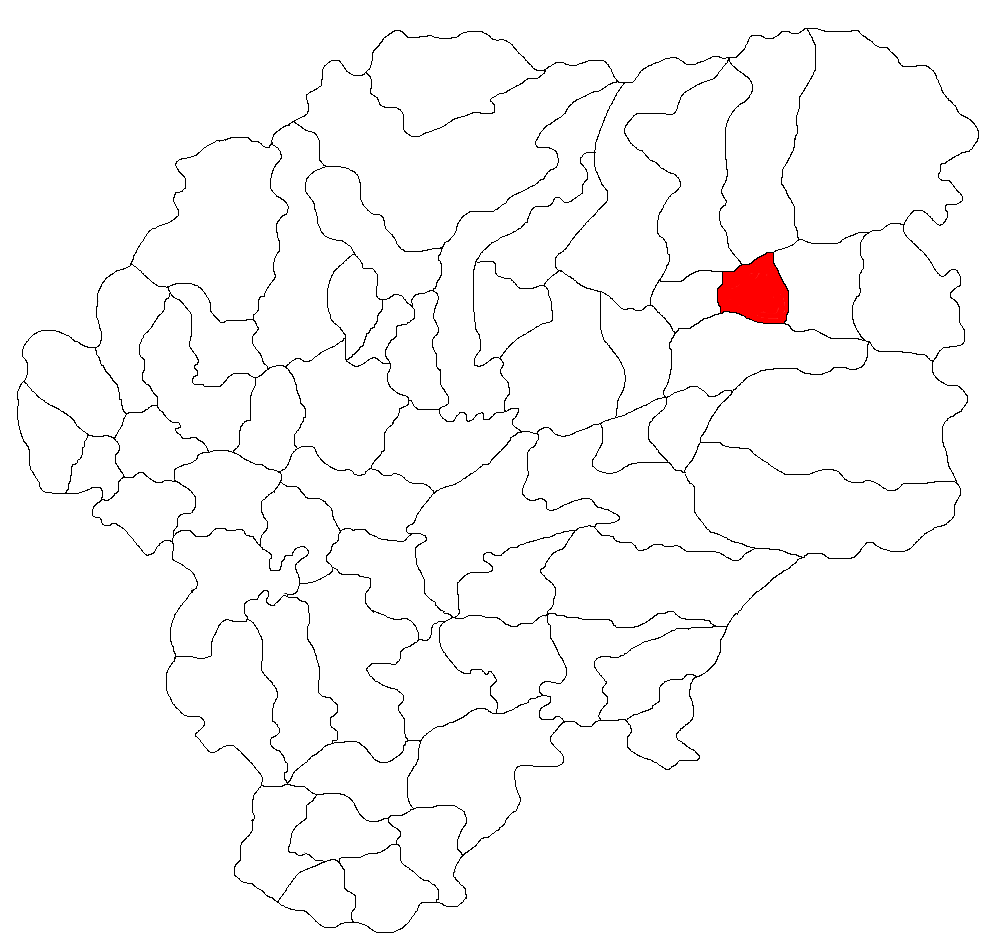
- Location in Bistrița-Năsăud County

- Location in Romania
- Coordinates: 47°23′N 24°48′E
- Country: Romania
- County: Bistrița-Năsăud

Government
  - Mayor (2020–2024): Valer Avram (PSD)
- Area: 27.70 km^{2} (10.70 sq mi)
- Elevation: 554 m (1,818 ft)
- Population (2021-12-01): 1,957
  - Density: 70.65/km^{2} (183.0/sq mi)
- Time zone: UTC+02:00 (EET)
  - Summer (DST): UTC+03:00 (EEST)
- Postal code: 427145
- Area code: +(40) 263
- Vehicle reg.: BN
- Website: www.magurailvei.ro

Măgura Ilvei (Hungarian: Magura or Ilvamagura) is a commune in Bistrița-Năsăud County, Transylvania, Romania. It is composed of two villages, Arșița (Arsicatelep) and Măgura Ilvei. It also included the village of Poiana Ilvei until 2003, when it was split off.
