= Tihuța Pass =

Mountain pass in Romania

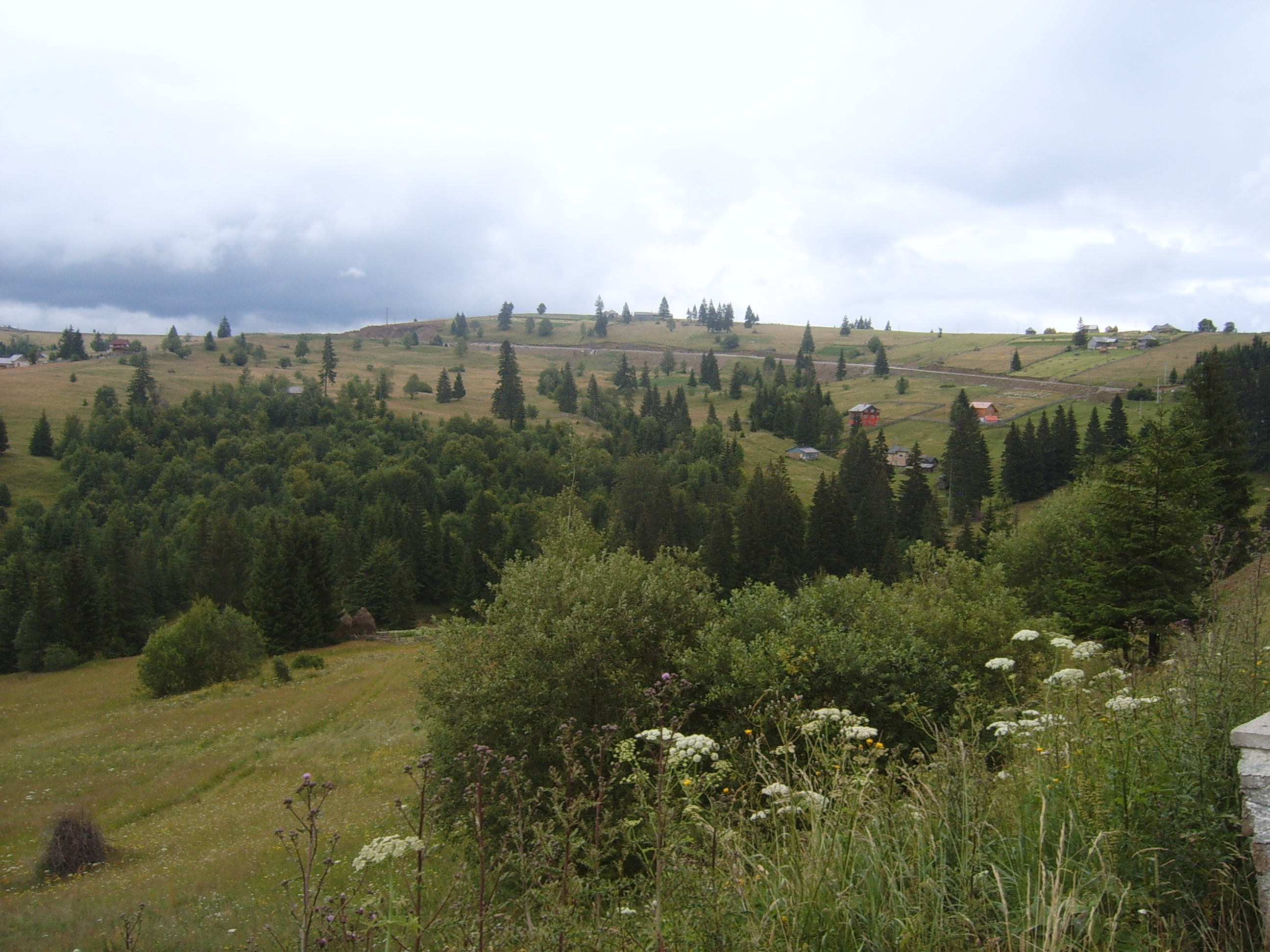

- Location within Romania
- Elevation: 1,201 metres (3,940 ft)
- Traversed by: E58

Third Approach
- Location: Romania
- Range: Bârgău Mountains; Călimani Mountains
- Coordinates: 47°16′48″N 25°01′30″E

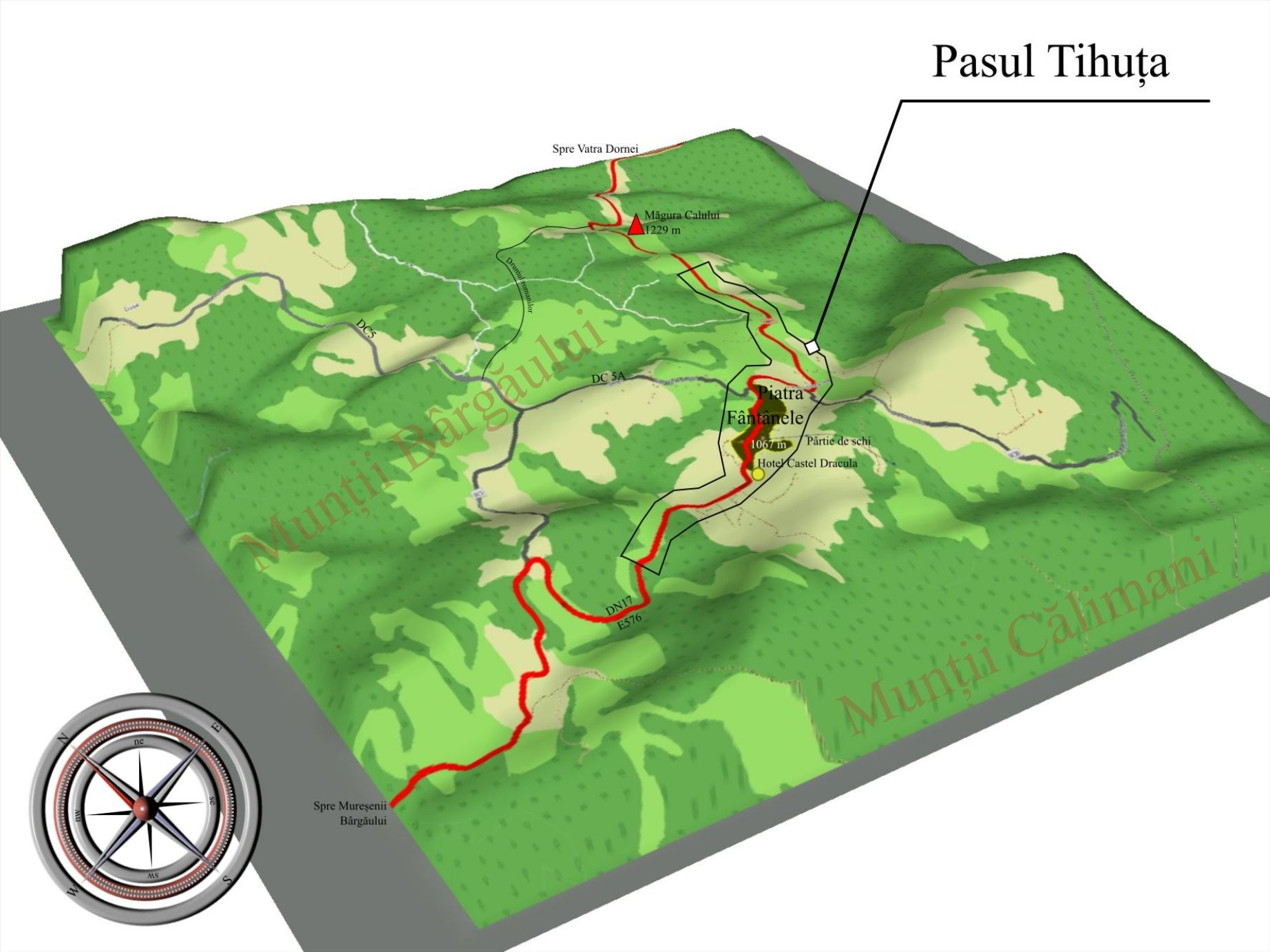
Relief map of Tihuța Pass

Tihuța Pass (Romanian: Pasul Tihuța, also called Pasul Bârgău; Hungarian: Borgói-hágó or Burgó) is a high mountain pass in the Eastern Carpathian Mountains of Romania, between the Bârgău Mountains to the north and the Călimani Mountains to the south. The 1,201 m (3,940 ft)-high pass connects Bistrița (Transylvania) with Vatra Dornei (Bukovina, Moldavia). Its western side is located in Piatra Fântânele village, Tiha Bârgăului, Bistrița-Năsăud County; the eastern side is in Căsoi village, Poiana Stampei, Suceava County. The Tihuța Pass is crossed by national road DN17 (part of European route E58), which starts in Dej and ends in Suceava.

The pass was made famous by Bram Stoker's novel Dracula, where, termed as "the Borgo Pass", it was the gateway to the realm of Count Dracula. Stoker most likely found the name on a contemporary map; he never actually visited the area. Today the pass is home to Hotel "Castel Dracula"; located at an elevation of 1,116 m (3,661 ft), the hotel was built in 1976 and adopted its current name after 1989. The hotel has become quite an attraction due to its architectural style of a medieval villa, as well as the connection to the novel. In 2018 the property was put up for sale.

Close to the Tihuța Pass is the Piatra Fântânele Monastery, which dates from 1928. The ensemble is dominated by a 31 m (102 ft) metal cross; built in 2010, this is the tallest such structure in Romania.

The Tihuța Pass is now part of the Via Transilvanica long-distance trail; it belongs to the 277 km (172 mi)-long The Highlands section of the trail, which runs from Bistrița to Poiana Stampei.

== See also ==
- List of highest paved roads in Europe
- List of mountain passes
