= Bistrița =

Bistrița German: Bistritz Transylvanian Saxon: Bästerts
- Municipality
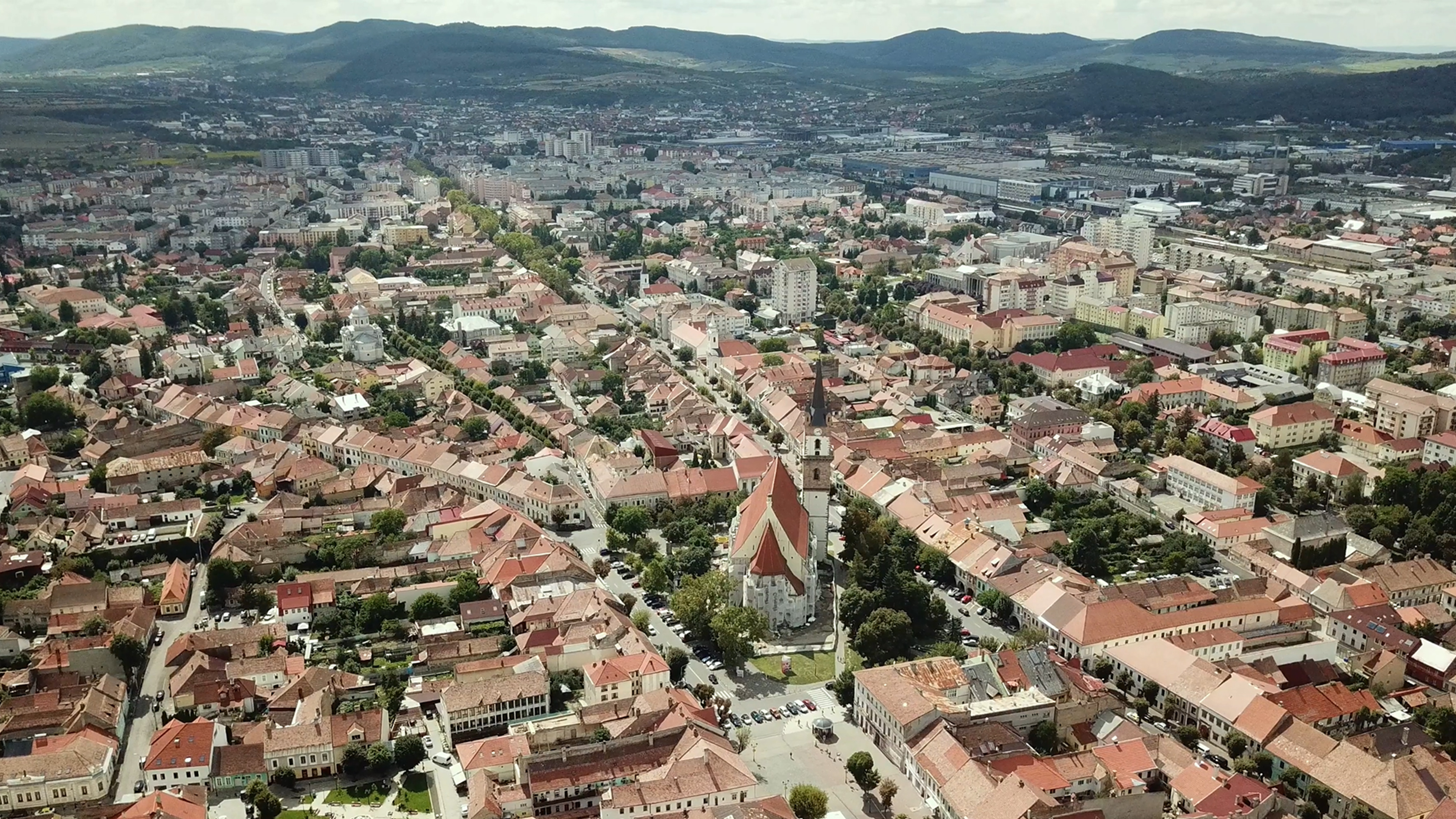
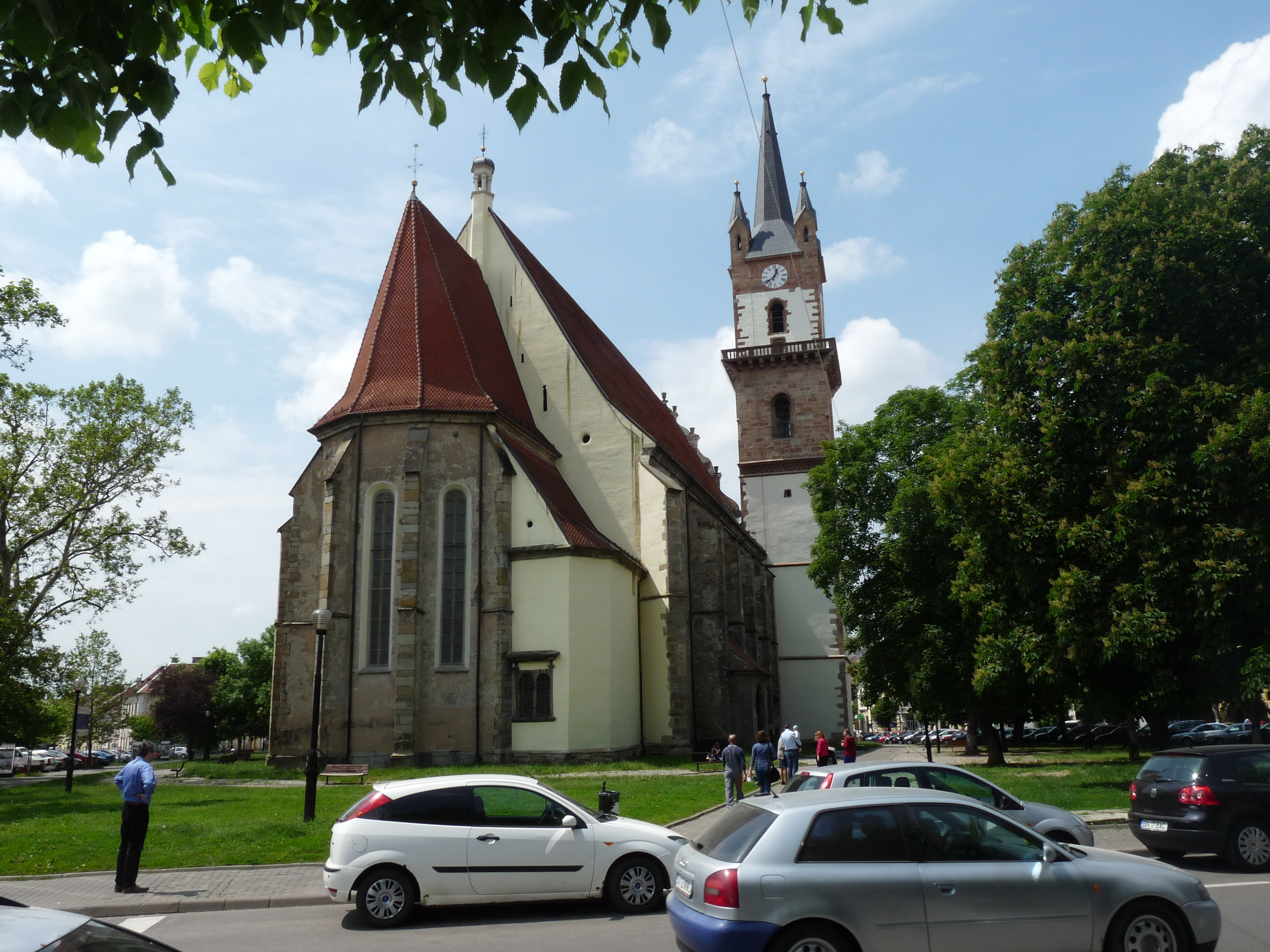
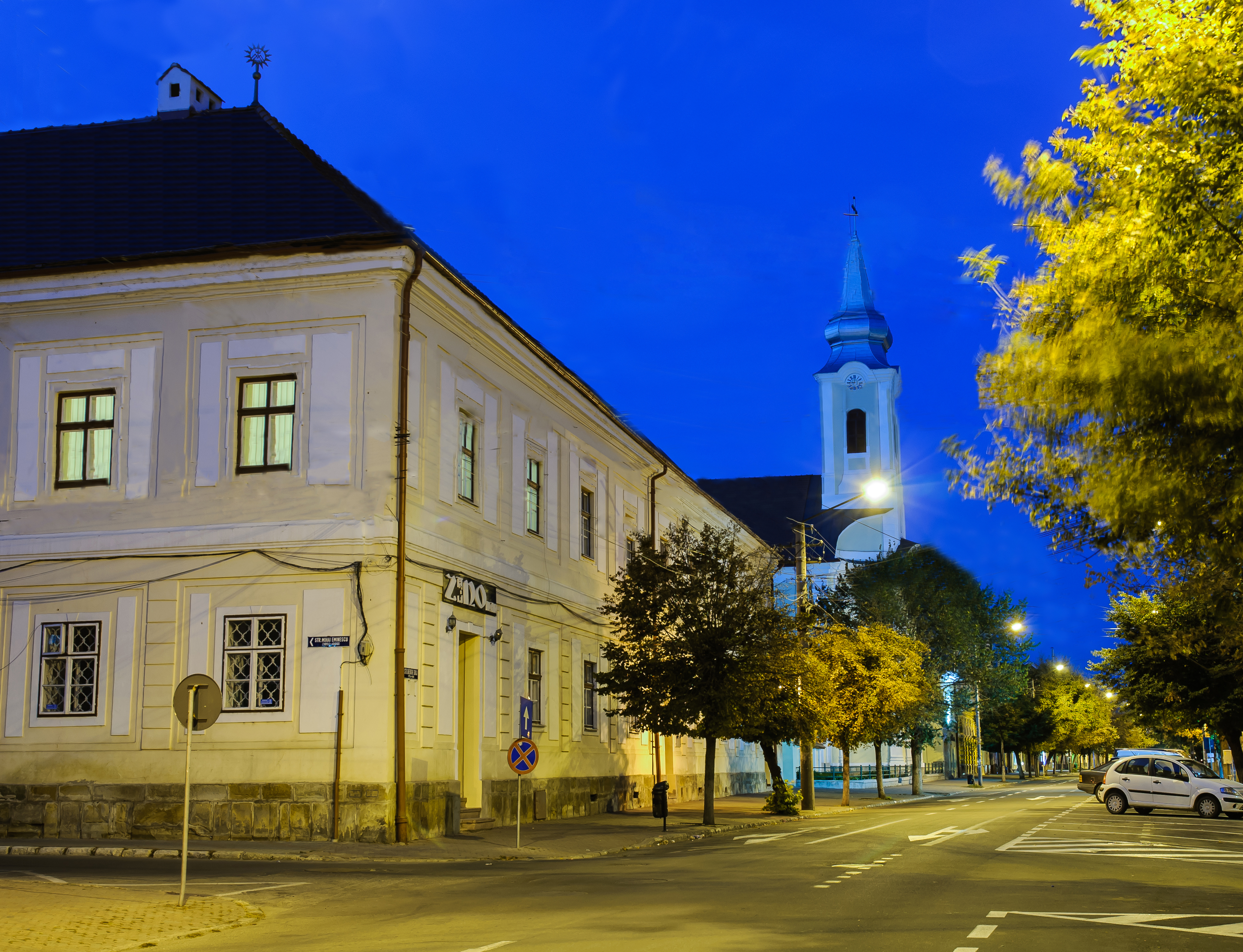
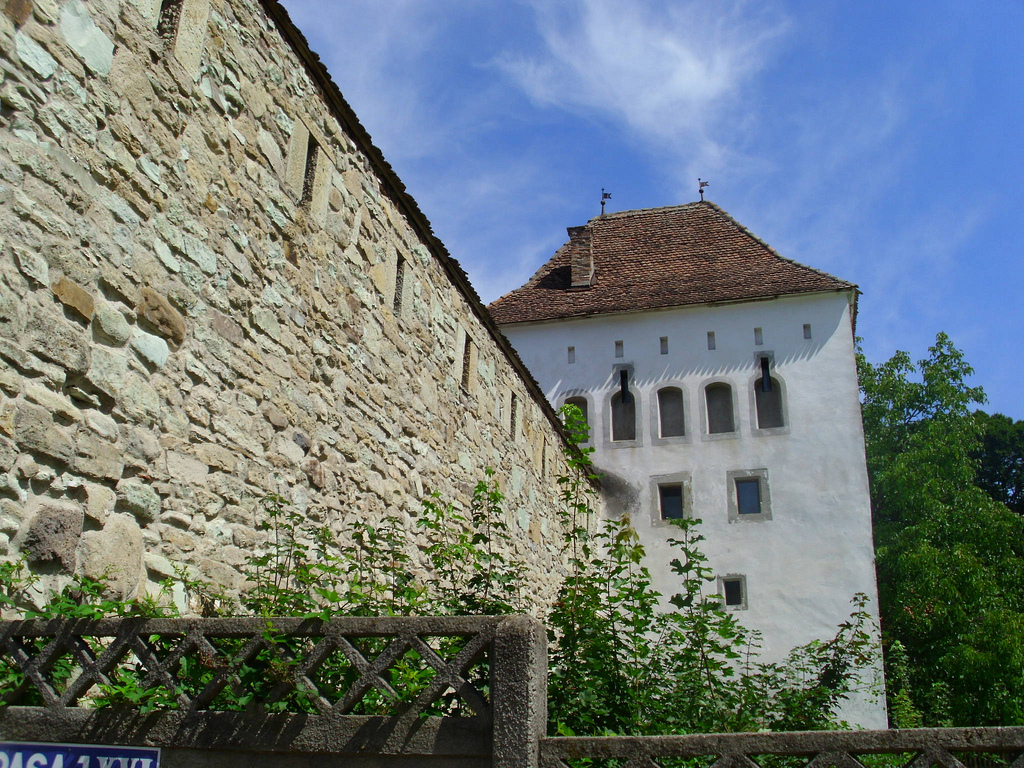
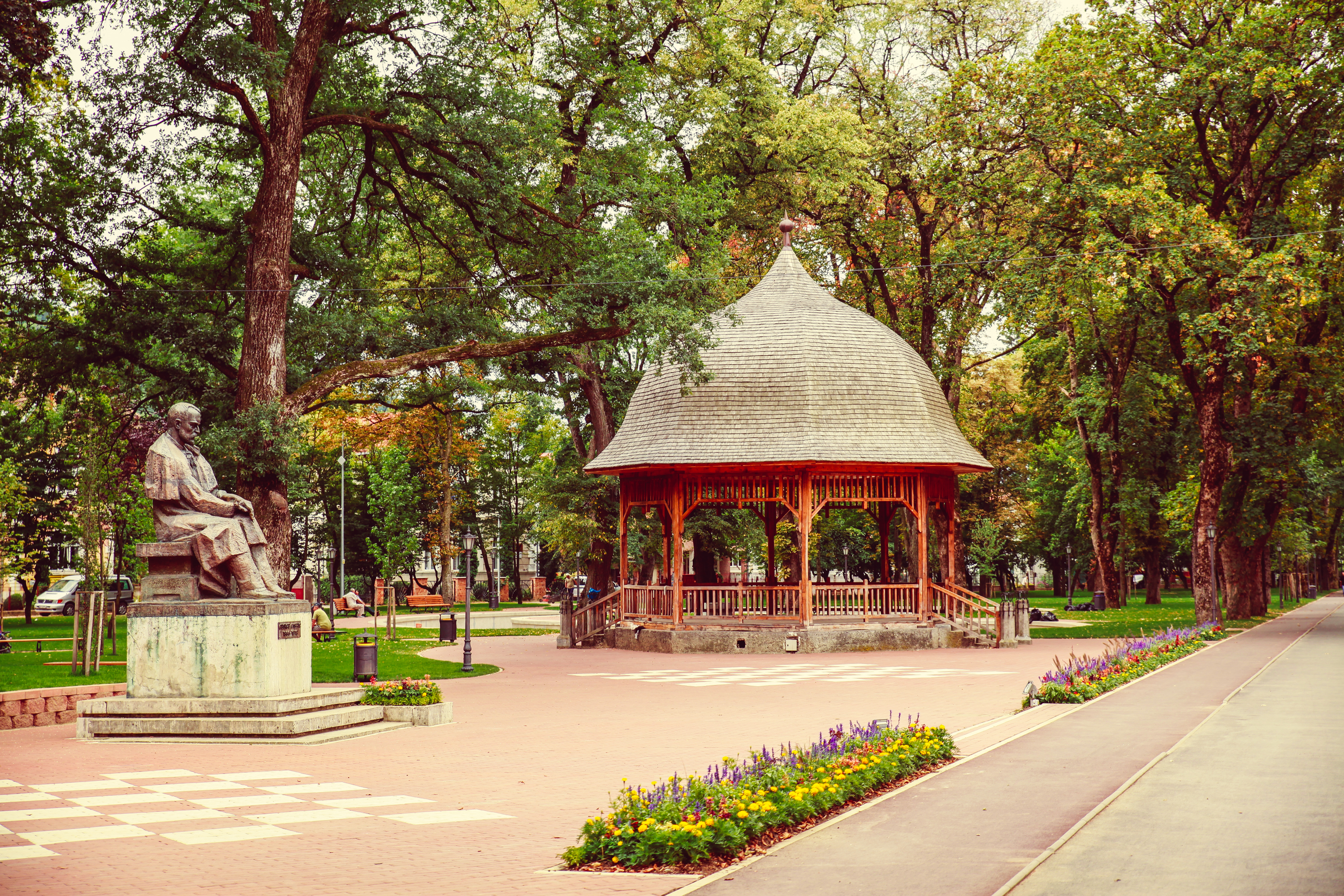
- Aerial view Evangelical Church Roman Catholic Church Bistrița Fortress Central Park

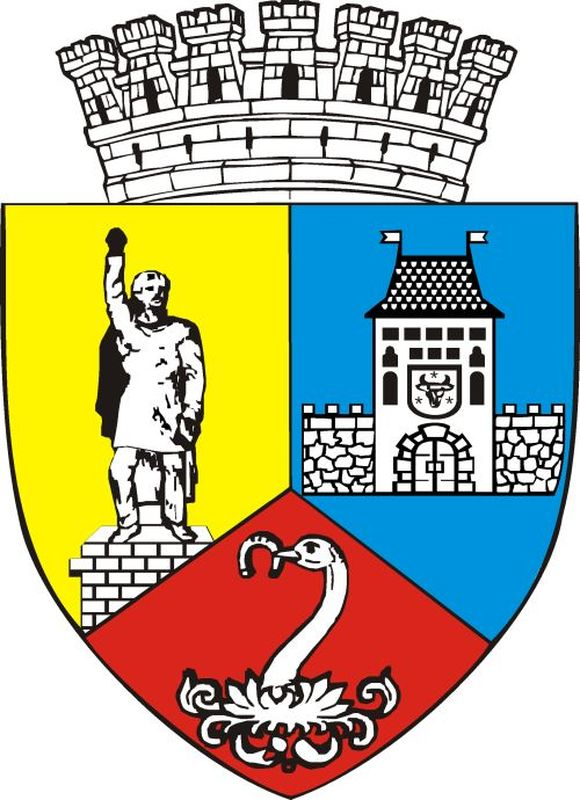
- Coat of arms

- Location in Bistrița-Năsăud County

- Location in Romania
- Coordinates: 47°8′N 24°30′E
- Country: Romania
- County: Bistrița-Năsăud

Government
  - Mayor (2024–2028): Gabriel Lazany (PSD)
- Area: 145.47 km^{2} (56.17 sq mi)
- Elevation: 356 m (1,168 ft)
- Population (2021-12-01): 78,877
  - Density: 542.22/km^{2} (1,404.3/sq mi)
- Time zone: UTC+02:00 (EET)
  - Summer (DST): UTC+03:00 (EEST)
- Postal code: 420040
- Area code: (+40) 02 63
- Vehicle reg.: BN
- Website: www.primariabistrita.ro

Bistrița (Romanian pronunciation: [ˈbistritsa]; German: Bistritz, archaic Nösen; Transylvanian Saxon: Bästerts; Hungarian: Beszterce) is the capital city of Bistrița-Năsăud County, in northern Transylvania, Romania. It is situated on the Bistrița River. The city has a population of 78,877 inhabitants as of 2021 and administers six villages: Ghinda (Windau; Vinda), Sărata (Salz; Sófalva), Sigmir (Schönbirk; Szépnyír), Slătinița (Pintak; Pinták), Unirea (until 1950 Aldorf; Wallendorf; Aldorf) and Viișoara (Heidendorf; Besenyő). There is a project for the creation of a metropolitan area that will contain the municipality of Bistrița and 3 surrounding localities (Șieu-Măgheruș, Budacu de Jos, and Livezile), whose combined population would be over 91,600 inhabitants.

== Etymology ==
The town was named after the Bistrița River, whose name comes from the Slavic word bystrica meaning 'fast-moving water'.

== History ==
The earliest sign of settlement in the area of Bistrița is in Neolithic remains. The Turkic Pechenegs settled the area in 12th century following attacks of the Cumans. Transylvanian Saxons settled the area in 1206 and called the region Nösnerland. A large part of settlers were fugitives, convicts, and poor people looking for lands and opportunities. The destruction of Markt Nosa ("Market Nösen") under the Mongols of central Europe is described in a document from 1241. The city was then called Byzturch. Situated on several trade routes, Bistrița became a flourishing medieval trading post.

Bistrița became a free royal town in 1330. In 1353, King Louis I of Hungary granted the town the right to organize an annual 15-day fair on Saint Bartholomew day, as well as a seal containing the coat of arms of an ostrich with a horseshoe in its beak. The town developed markets throughout Moldavia, and its craftsmen travelled extensively. It was given the right to be surrounded by defensive walls in 1409. In 1465, the city's fortifications had 18 defensive towers and bastions defended by the local guilds. It was also defended by a Kirchenburg, or fortified church. In 1713 the Romanian population was expelled by the Saxon magistrates, but they returned later. The town was badly damaged by fire five times between 1836 and 1850. The church suffered from fire in 1857, when the tower's roof and the bells were destroyed. The roof was rebuilt after several years. Fires in the nineteenth century also destroyed much of the city's medieval citadel.

A Jewish community developed in Bistrița after the prohibition on Jewish settlement there was lifted in 1848, organizing itself in the 1860s. The synagogue, consecrated in 1893, is among Transylvania's largest and most impressive. The community was Orthodox with a strong Hasidic section, but there were also Jews who adopted German and Hungarian culture. A Zionist youth organization, Ivriyah, was founded in Bistrița in 1901 by Nissan Kahan, who corresponded with Theodor Herzl and there was significant support for the Zionist movement in the town between the two world wars. A large yeshivah flourished under the direction of the rabbi of Bistrița, Solomon Zalman Ullmann, between 1924 and 1942. During World War I, 138 Bistrița Jews were conscripted into the Austro-Hungarian Army; 12 were killed in action.

The city was part of the Austro-Hungarian Empire until 1918. On December 1 that year, Transylvania united with Romania, and Romanian Army troops entered Bistrița on December 5. In 1925, Bistrița became the capital of Năsăud County.

=== World War II ===
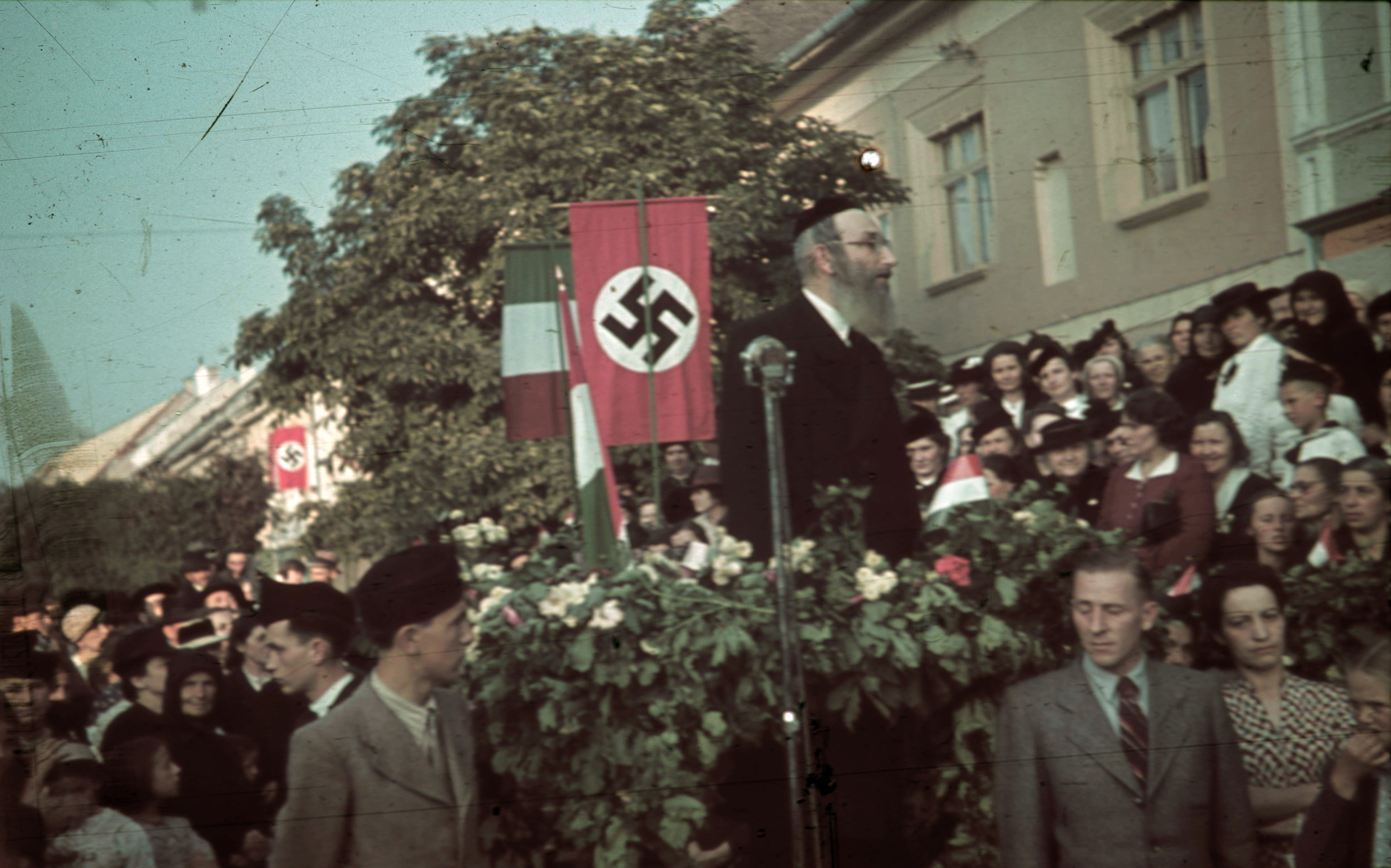
Hungarian troops march in to Liviu Rebreanu Street in Bistrița, on September 8, 1940

In the wake of the Second Vienna Award (August 1940), the city reverted to the Kingdom of Hungary. During the war, the Hungarian authorities deported several dozen Jewish families in 1941 from Bistrița to Kamenets-Podolski in the Galician area of occupied Ukraine, where they were killed by Hungarian soldiers. The Jews of Bistrița, as elsewhere in Hungary, were subjected to restrictions, and Jewish men of military age were drafted for forced labor service. In May 1944, the Jewish population was forced into the Bistrița ghetto, set up at Stamboli Farm, about two miles from the city. The ghetto consisted of a number of barracks and pigsties. At its peak, the ghetto held close to 6,000 Jews, including those brought in from the neighboring communities in Beszterce-Naszód County. Among these were the Jews of Borgóbeszterce, Borgóprund, Galacfalva, Kisilva, Marosborgó, Nagyilva, Nagysajó, Naszód, Óradna, and Romoly. The ghetto was liquidated with the deportation of its inhabitants to Auschwitz in two transports on June 2 and 6, 1944.

After King Michael's Coup of August 1944, Romania switched sides to the Allies. By October of that year, Romanian and Soviet troops gained control of all of Northern Transylvania, which was reintegrated into Romania in March 1945. In 1950, Bistrița became the seat of Rodna Region; in 1952, the region was dissolved and the city became the seat of Bistrița raion (part of Cluj Region) until 1968.

=== Recent events ===
On June 11, 2008, the tower and roof of the church caught fire when three children who went to steal copper set it on fire while playing. The main part of the church suffered only slight damage, the interior remaining intact. It is speculated that both of the tower's bells, one dating from the 15th century, the other from the 17th, may have melted in the blaze.

== Climate ==
According to Köppen climate classification, Bistrița has a humid continental climate(Dfb) with cold, snowy winters and warm, rainy summers. Due to its modest elevation, Bistrița has one of the coldest climates in Romania.

Climate data for Bistrița (1991–2020 normals, extremes 1961–present)
Month	Jan	Feb	Mar	Apr	May	Jun	Jul	Aug	Sep	Oct	Nov	Dec	Year
Record high °C (°F)	16.9 (62.4)	19.1 (66.4)	26.0 (78.8)	29.7 (85.5)	31.7 (89.1)	36.0 (96.8)	37.2 (99.0)	38.0 (100.4)	35.3 (95.5)	31.2 (88.2)	27.0 (80.6)	18.0 (64.4)	38.0 (100.4)
Mean daily maximum °C (°F)	1.7 (35.1)	4.4 (39.9)	10.1 (50.2)	16.9 (62.4)	21.9 (71.4)	25.2 (77.4)	27.0 (80.6)	27.3 (81.1)	21.8 (71.2)	16.1 (61.0)	9.6 (49.3)	2.7 (36.9)	15.4 (59.7)
Daily mean °C (°F)	−2.6 (27.3)	−1.0 (30.2)	3.9 (39.0)	10.2 (50.4)	15.2 (59.4)	18.8 (65.8)	20.2 (68.4)	19.9 (67.8)	14.6 (58.3)	9.1 (48.4)	4.0 (39.2)	−1.1 (30.0)	9.3 (48.7)
Mean daily minimum °C (°F)	−6.0 (21.2)	−5.0 (23.0)	−0.8 (30.6)	4.4 (39.9)	9.0 (48.2)	12.5 (54.5)	13.9 (57.0)	13.6 (56.5)	9.3 (48.7)	4.4 (39.9)	0.2 (32.4)	−4.1 (24.6)	4.3 (39.7)
Record low °C (°F)	−33.8 (−28.8)	−33.2 (−27.8)	−22.0 (−7.6)	−5.9 (21.4)	−3.0 (26.6)	0.3 (32.5)	3.2 (37.8)	−1.6 (29.1)	−8.6 (16.5)	−12.7 (9.1)	−25.1 (−13.2)	−26.6 (−15.9)	−33.8 (−28.8)
Average precipitation mm (inches)	42.6 (1.68)	39.7 (1.56)	43.7 (1.72)	50.7 (2.00)	81.5 (3.21)	87.4 (3.44)	87.4 (3.44)	63.3 (2.49)	65.6 (2.58)	53.9 (2.12)	44.6 (1.76)	51.1 (2.01)	711.5 (28.01)
Average snowfall cm (inches)	13.0 (5.1)	14.3 (5.6)	9.8 (3.9)	2.0 (0.8)	0.0 (0.0)	0.0 (0.0)	0.0 (0.0)	0.0 (0.0)	0.0 (0.0)	3.5 (1.4)	3.8 (1.5)	7.2 (2.8)	53.6 (21.1)
Average precipitation days (≥ 1.0 mm)	9.0	8.0	7.7	8.8	11.1	10.7	10.0	7.1	8.1	7.5	8.3	9.1	105.4
Average dew point °C (°F)	−7.0 (19.4)	−5.2 (22.6)	−0.6 (30.9)	3.8 (38.8)	9.0 (48.2)	12.2 (54.0)	13.5 (56.3)	13.2 (55.8)	10.1 (50.2)	5.0 (41.0)	0.6 (33.1)	−3.3 (26.1)	4.3 (39.7)
Mean monthly sunshine hours	70.5	93.2	153.4	197.3	249.0	267.5	282.3	282.4	193.3	161.8	98.6	56.5	2,105.8
Source 1: NOAA(Snow-Dew Point 1961-1990)
Source 2: Meteomanz (records since 2021)

== Demographics ==
Historical population
Year	Pop.	±%
1850	5,214	—
1891	9,100	+74.5%
1900	12,155	+33.6%
1912	13,236	+8.9%
1930	14,128	+6.7%
1941	16,282	+15.2%
1948	15,801	−3.0%
1956	20,292	+28.4%
1966	25,519	+25.8%
1977	44,339	+73.7%
1992	87,710	+97.8%
2002	81,467	−7.1%
2004	82,400	+1.1%
2011	75,076	−8.9%
2021	78,877	+5.1%
Source: Census data, Encyclopedia Judaica

In 1850, of the 5,214 inhabitants, 3,704 were Germans (71%), 1,207 Romanians (23.1%), 176 Roma (3.4%), 90 Hungarians (1.7%), and 37 (0.7%) of other ethnicities. According to the census of 1910, the town had 13,236 inhabitants of whom 5,835 were German (44%), 4,470 Romanian (33.77%), 2,824 Hungarian (21.33%).

At the 2021 census, the city had a population of 78,877. According to the 2011 census, there were 75,076 inhabitants of Bistrița, making it the 30th largest city in Romania, with the following ethnic makeup:

- Romanians: 64,214 (91.09%)
- Hungarians: 4,109 (5.82%)
- Roma: 1,644 (2.33%)
- Germans (Transylvanian Saxons): 304 (0.43%)
- Others: 0.16%

Prior to World War II there was a sizable Jewish community living in the town. In 1891, 718 of the 9,100 inhabitants (8%) were Jews; in 1900 (11%) and 2,198 (16%) in 1930. In 1941 there are 2,358 (14%). In 1947, 1,300 Jews resettled in Bistrița, including survivors from the extermination camps, former residents of neighboring villages, and others liberated from the Nazi concentration camps. Given continuing discrimination and unfavorable political conditions, the Jewish population declined steadily as a result of emigration to Israel, the United States, and Canada. By 2002, only about 15 Jews lived in the city.

== Main sights ==
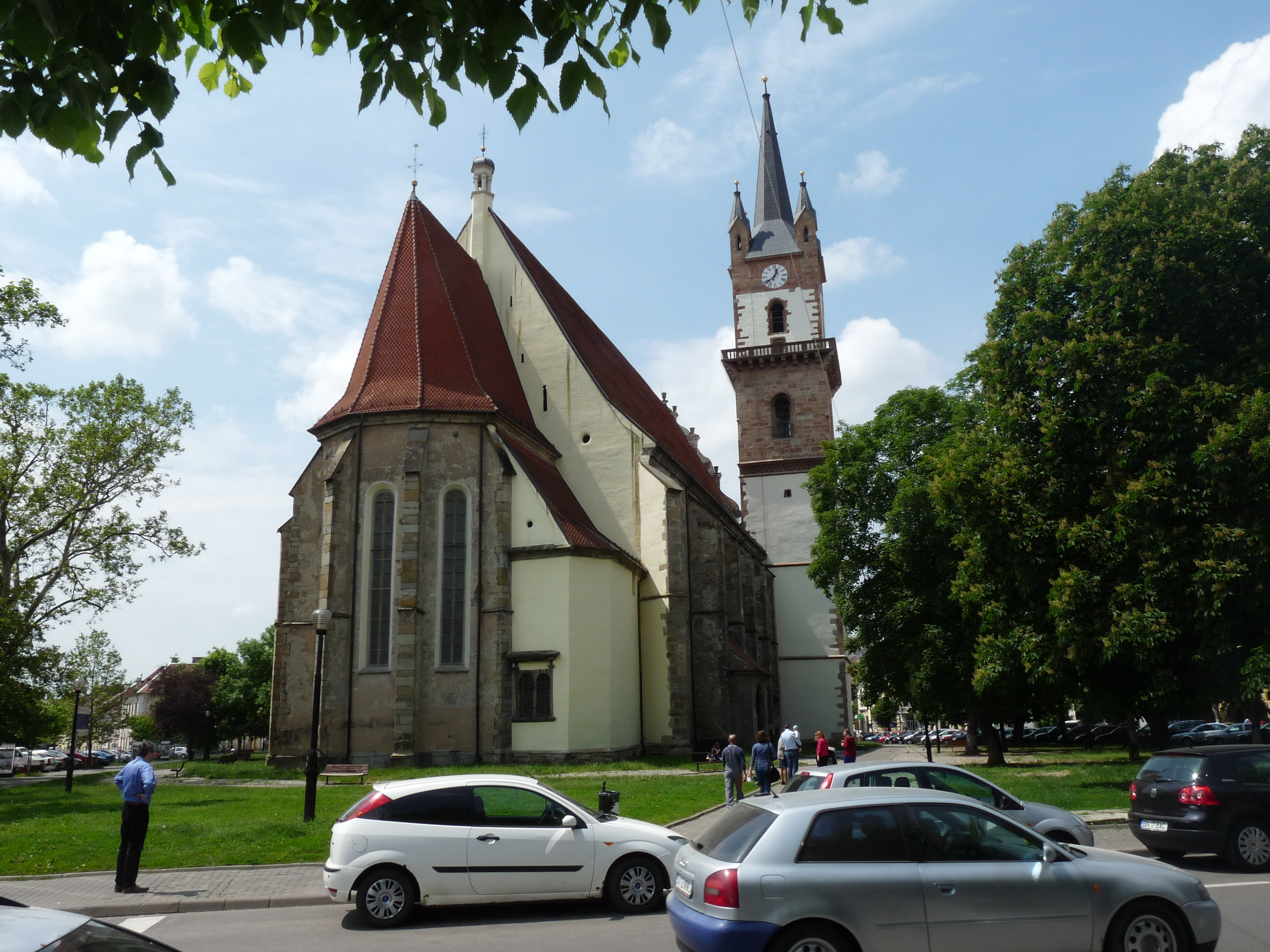
The renovated Evangelical Church, whose roof was heavily damaged in a fire in 2008

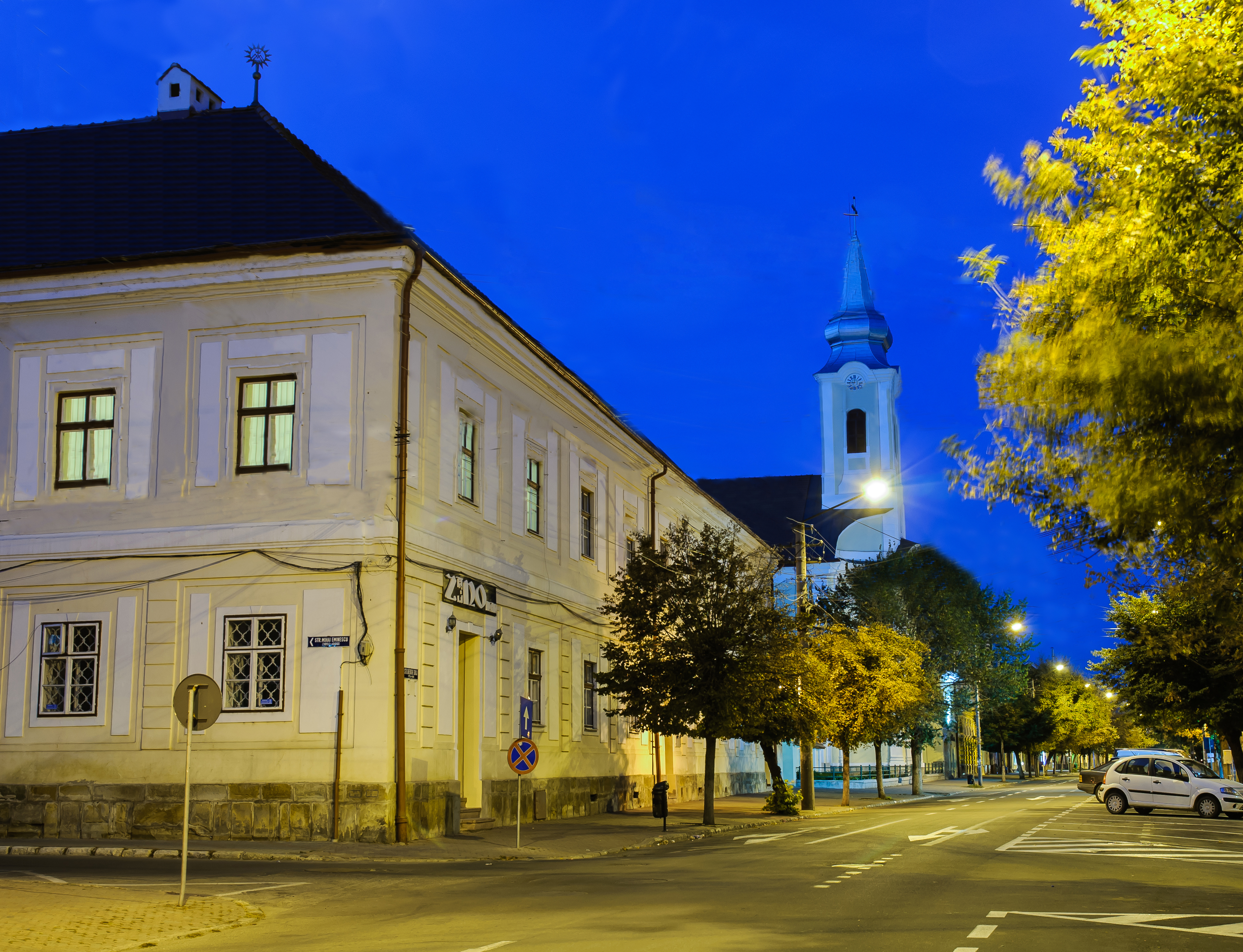
Roman Catholic Church

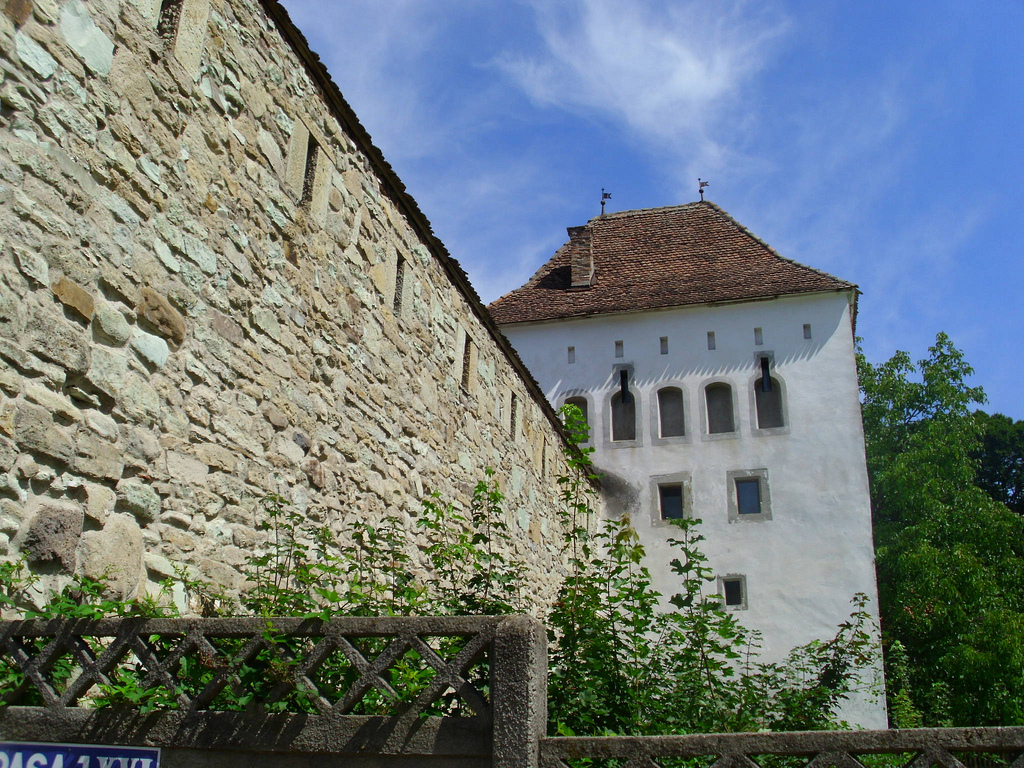
Bistrița Fortress

- The main attraction of Bistrița's central square is the Lutheran church, which was built by the Transylvanian Saxons and originally constructed in the 14th century in Gothic style. Between 1559 and 1563 it was altered by Petrus Italus and given Renaissance features. It was significantly renovated after the 2008 fire which damaged the tower.
- The Minorite Monastery, situated in the eastern side of the old town, close to the location of the former defensive walls, is one of the oldest buildings in Bistrița. Built between 1270 and 1280, the building has undergone several repairs and alterations, the first one being recorded in 1494. After 1541, when the Minorite order left the town, it served as a barn and wine cellar. In 1724, the Catholic Church returned to Bistrița and the church was reopened. In 1895, the Romanian Greek Catholic Church purchased the building for 35,000 florins. The church was turned into an Orthodox church in 1948, when the communist government dissolved the Romanian Greek Catholic Church and transferred its properties to the Romanian Orthodox Church, and was decorated in Neo-Byzantine style in 1978–1980.
- The Bistrița-Năsăud County Museum, located in a former barracks, contains Thracian, Celtic, and German artifacts.
- The buildings of the city's two leading high schools, Andrei Mureșanu National College and Liviu Rebreanu National College.

== Popular culture ==
In Bram Stoker's novel Dracula, the character Jonathan Harker visits Bistrița (rendered as Bistritz, the German name for the city, in the original text) and stays at the Golden Krone Hotel (Romanian: Coroana de Aur); although no such hotel existed when the novel was written, a hotel of the same name has since been built.

In the PlayStation 2 game Shadow Hearts, Bistrița (where it is spelled "Biztritz") was a major place and home to the role-playing character Keith Valentine.

== Transportation ==
The major cities directly linked by trains to this city are Bucharest via a night train, and Cluj-Napoca via several trains. Access from Bistrița to major railway lines is generally through connections in Dej, Beclean, or Reghin, although some other trains stop at the nearby railway junction of Sărățel.

Bistrița also serves as a midway point for C&I, a transport service, and is a changing point for people traveling between Suceava, Satu Mare, Cluj-Napoca, Sibiu, Sighișoara, Târgu Mureș, and Brașov.

The nearest airport is Cluj-Napoca Airport, which is located 102 kilometres (63 miles) from Bistrița.

== Tourism ==
- Arcalia Dendrological Park (17 km (11 mi) from Bistrița), hosts over 150 species of trees (such as Japanese acacia, silver fir trees, Caucasian Spruce fir, etc.); it exists in the land belonging to Babeș-Bolyai University
- Colibița Lake (artificial dam, situated in the Bârgău Mountains)
- Lakes Lala Mare and Lala Mic (glacier lakes, below Ineu Peak)
- The city is home to a section of the Via Transilvanica long-distance trail.

=== Natural reservations ===
- National park in the Rodna Mountains, which covers 37,429 hectares (144.51 sq mi) in Bistrița-Năsăud County
- Piatra Corbului – "Raven's Rock", a geological and vegetal park, situated in the Călimani Mountains
- The Salt Mount in Sărățel
- Tăușoare Cave, the deepest cave in Romania – 478.5 metres (1,570 ft)

=== Resorts ===
- Sângeorz–Băi (balneo – climatic resort, situated in the Rodna Mountains, approx. 55 km (34 mi) from Bistrița)
- Colibița (approx. 50 km (31 mi) from Bistrița)
- Piatra Fântânele (approx. 60 km (37 mi) from Bistrița, at an altitude of 1,100 m (3,608.92 ft) – Tihuța Pass)
- Valea Vinului – Wine Valley – (approx. 90 km (56 mi) from Bistrița)

=== Museums and exhibitions ===
- Transylvanian Saxons' Museum – Livezile
- Museum of Contemporary Art – Sângeorz-Băi
- Andrei Mureșanu Memorial House – Bistrița
- Liviu Rebreanu Memorial House – Liviu Rebreanu village
- Silversmith's House – Bistrița
- George Coșbuc Memorial House – Coșbuc village
- Ion-Pop Reteganul Memorial House – Reteag village
- Bistrița Synagogue

== Notable people ==
- Gavril Bănulescu-Bodoni (1746–1821), bishop
- Maria Bosi (born 1954), handball player
- Adrian Crișan (born 1980), table tennis player
- Arnold Graffi (1910–2006), doctor
- Anita Hartig (born 1983), operatic soprano
- Kalinikos Kreanga (born 1972), table tennis player
- Viorel Moldovan (born 1972), football player and coach
- Valeria Motogna-Beșe (born 1979), handball player
- Andrei Mureșanu (1816–1863), writer of the Romanian national anthem
- Radu Negulescu (born 1939), table tennis player
- Remus Nicolai (born 1977), aerobic gymnast
- Max Speter (1883–1942), German chemist and science historian
- Daniel Suciu (born 1980), politician
- Gabriela Szabo (born 1975), track and field athlete

== Sport ==
=== Teams ===
- CS Gloria 2018 Bistrița-Năsăud playing in Romania's Liga Națională (women's handball), Romanian Handball Federation
- CS Gloria Bistrița-Năsăud, the city's most important team both historically and valuably, currently inactive, commonly known as Gloria is a Romanian football club based Bistrita, Bistrița-Năsăud County, currently playing in the Liga II.

== Twin towns and sister cities ==
Bistrița is twinned with:

- Besançon, France (since 1997)
- Zielona Góra, Poland (since 2001)
- (United States) Columbus, Georgia, US (since 2003)
- Herzogenrath, Germany (since 2005)
- L'Aquila, Italy (since 2006)
- Wels, Austria (since 2014)
- Wiehl, Germany (since 2015)
- Rehovot, Israel (since 2017)
