= Josenii Bârgăului =

- Commune
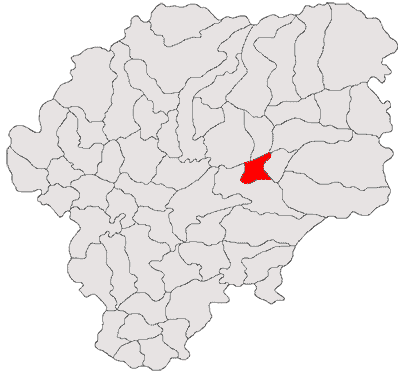
- Location in Bistrița-Năsăud County

- Location in Romania
- Coordinates: 47°13′N 24°41′E
- Country: Romania
- County: Bistrița-Năsăud

Government
  - Mayor (2024–2028): Marius-Vasile Urs (PSD)
- Area: 55.58 km^{2} (21.46 sq mi)
- Elevation: 468 m (1,535 ft)
- Population (2021-12-01): 5,079
  - Density: 91.38/km^{2} (236.7/sq mi)
- Time zone: UTC+02:00 (EET)
  - Summer (DST): UTC+03:00 (EEST)
- Postal code: 427100
- Area code: +(40) 263
- Vehicle reg.: BN
- Website: joseniibirgaului.ro

Josenii Bârgăului (Hungarian: Alsóborgó or Borgó-Zsoszény or Borgozsoszeny; German: Unterburgau) is a commune in Bistrița-Năsăud County, Transylvania, Romania.

It is composed of four villages: Josenii Bârgăului, Mijlocenii Bârgăului (Hungarian: Középborgó; German: Mittel-Borgo or Mittelburgau), Rusu Bârgăului (Hungarian: Oroszborgó; German: Reussen or Borgo-Ruß), and Strâmba (Hungarian: Dornavölgyitelep; German: Krummdorf).

== Natives ==
- Aurel Rău (born 1930), poet, novelist, and translator
