= Bârgău Mountains =

Mountain range of the Inner Eastern Carpathians, Romania

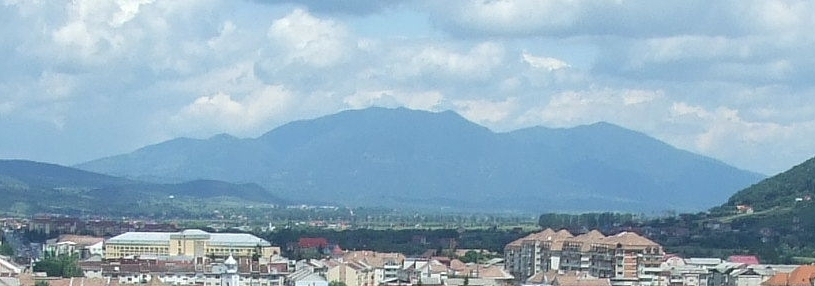
The Bârgău Mountains, viewed from Bistrița

The Bârgău Mountains (Hungarian: Borgói-hegység) are a mountain range in the Carpathian Mountains, part of the Căliman-Harghita Mountains in the Bistrița-Năsăud County, in the north of Romania.

The highest point is Heniu Mare at 1,610.5 metres (5,284 feet).
