= 2019–20 Cupa României (women's football) =

2019–20 Cupa României Feminin
Cupa României 2019–20

Tournament details
- Country: Romania
- Teams: 40

Tournament statistics
- Matches played: 31

The 2019–20 Cupa României is the 17th season of the annual Romanian primary football knockout tournament. It was cancelled due to the 2019-20 coronavirus pandemic during the Round of 16.

== Participating clubs ==
The following 40 teams qualified for the competition:

2019–20 Liga I all clubs (12)	2019–20 Liga II without 2 second teams and 1 dissolved club (11)	2019–20 Liga III without 2 second teams (17)
entering in Second Round/ Round of 32: Fair Play București; Fortuna Becicherecu Mic; Heniu Prundu Bârgăului; U Olimpia Cluj; Universitatea Galați; CSȘ Târgoviște; Independența Baia Mare; Universitatea Alexandria; Vasas Femina Odorhei; Selena ȘN Constanța; Piroș Security Arad; Luceafărul Filiași	entering in Second Round/ Round of 32: Carmen București; Ladies Târgu Mureş; Navobi Iași; Nicu Gane Fălticeni; Onix Râmnicu Sărat; Vulpițele Galbene Roman; Atletic Drobeta-Turnu-Severin; Banat Girls Reșița; CSM Târgu Mureș; Olimpic Star Cluj; United Bihor	entering in First Round: Viitorul Arad; Student Sport Alba Iulia; Atletic Olimpia Gherla; Viitorul Reghin; Politehnica Timişoara; Juventus Timișoara; Măgura Cisnădie; Csiksereda Miercurea Ciuc; CSM Pașcani; Măgura 2012 Bacău; Activ Slobozia; Progresul Bucureşti; Dunărea 2020 Giurgiu; Dream Team București; Colţea 1920 Braşov; FCM Târgoviște; entering in Second Round/ Round of 32: Zimbrul Tulcea

== Round dates ==
Round	First match date	Reference date	Last match date
First Round	5 October 2019	6 October 2019	9 October 2019
Second Round/ Round of 32	30 October 2019	10 November 2019	20 November 2019
Third Round/ Round of 16	29 February 2020		Cancelled
Quarter-finals	Cancelled		
Semi-finals	Cancelled		
Final	Cancelled		

== First round ==
16 Liga III teams entered the competition for the First Round. The 8 matches in this round were initially scheduled on Sunday, 6 October. One match was played in advance on Saturday 5 October, another was postponed until the following Wednesday, on 9 October. One match was cancelled following the withdrawal of ACS Viitorul Reghin, while the rest of 5 were played according to the original schedule.

5 October 2019	Viitorul Arad (3)	3–8	Student Sport Alba Iulia (3)	Livada, Arad
16:30 EEST (UTC+3)		Report (FRF)		Stadium: Baza Sportivă Livada; Referee: Iova Cătălin Ionuț; Assistant referees: Cîrmaci Filip Sergiu, Șușcă Andreea Daniela

6 October 2019	Atletic Olimpia Gherla (3)	w/o	Viitorul Reghin (3)	Gherla
		Report (FRF)		Stadium: Olimpia

6 October 2019	Politehnica Timişoara (3)	5–3	Juventus Timișoara (3)	Timișoara
11:00 EEST (UTC+3)		Report (FRF)		Stadium: Baza Poli 2 Referee: Balaj Elisei; Assistant referees: Gherman Alexandru, Argatu Florin Alexandru

6 October 2019	Măgura Cisnădie (3)	2–3	Csiksereda Miercurea Ciuc (3)	Cisnădie
11:00 EEST (UTC+3)		Report (FRF)		Stadium: Textila; Referee: Vieru Cristian; Assistant referees: Spătar Răzvan, Popa Razvan

6 October 2019	CSM Pașcani (3)	3–1	Măgura 2012 Bacău (3)	Pașcani
11:00 EEST (UTC+3)		Report (FRF)		Stadium: CFR; Referee: Burla Valentin; Assistant referees: Contofan Iulian, Melinte Ionut

6 October 2019	Activ Slobozia (3)	7–0	Progresul Bucureşti (3)	Slobozia
11:00 EEST (UTC+3)		Report (FRF)		Stadium: Teren Bucu; Referee: Porumbel Valentin; Assistant referees: Neagu Gabriel, Bitan Ionut

6 October 2019	Dunărea 2020 Giurgiu (3)	0–10	Dream Team București (3)	Giurgiu
12:00 EEST (UTC+3)		Report (FRF)		Stadium: Terenul Astra 2 Referee: Nanu Ionut Catalin; Assistant referees: Făinaru Victor, Vrabie Robert

9 October 2019	Colţea 1920 Braşov (3)	3–1	FCM Târgoviște (3)	Tărlungeni
11:00 EEST (UTC+3)		Report (FRF)		Stadium: Unirea; Referee: Mormeci Dumitru Robert; Assistant referees: Pânzaru Viorel, Tunsoiu Marian

== Second Round/ Round of 32 ==
The 8 teams that advanced from the First Round were joined by the remaining teams: 1 Liga III team, 11 Liga II teams and 12 Liga I teams, for a total of 32 teams playing 16 matches. The matches were scheduled to be played on or around 10 November. One was played well in advance, on 30 October 2019, while two on Friday 8 November, one more on 9 November, and two were postponed to 20 November. 10 games were played on the original scheduled day of 10 November.

30 October 2019	Ladies Târgu Mureş (3)	0–12	U Olimpia Cluj (1)	Miercurea Nirajului
15:00 EET (UTC+2)		Report (FRF)		Stadium: Comunal; Referee: Ștef Claudiu; Assistant referees: Albu Balint, Gaspar Vladut

8 November 2019	United Bihor (2)	0–3 (awd.)	Fortuna Becicherecu Mic (1)	Tileagd
14:00 EET (UTC+2)		Report (FRF)		Stadium: Foresta; Referee: Ciuchiță Laurentiu; Assistant referees: Lakatos Rares, Urs George

8 November 2019	Atletic Drobeta-Turnu-Severin (2)	0–4	Luceafărul Filiași (1)	Drobeta Turnu Severin
15:00 EET (UTC+2)		Report (FRF)		Stadium: Termo; Referee: Balanga Luis; Assistant referees: Ghilă Mihaiță Marian, Sucila Cristian-Constantin

9 November 2019	Banat Girls Reșița (2)	13–1	Politehnica Timişoara (3)	Reșița
14:00 EET (UTC+2)		Report (FRF)		Stadium: Gloria; Referee: Svatsinka Roberto; Assistant referees: Humita Ioan Daniel, Bagherea Madalin Georgian

10 November 2019	Zimbrul Tulcea (3)	0–11	Selena ȘN Constanța (1)	Topolog
11:00 EET (UTC+2)		Report (FRF)		Stadium: Comunal; Referee: Berghea Petre Cristian; Assistant referees: Colniceanu Dorinel, Camatar Onur Taner

10 November 2019	Onix Râmnicu Sărat (2)	1–9	Universitatea Galați (1)	Râmnicu Sărat
11:00 EET (UTC+2)		Report (FRF)		Stadium: Onix; Referee: Naum Alexandru; Assistant referees: Alexandru Eugen Petre, Leu Stefan

10 November 2019	CSM Pașcani (3)	0–2	Navobi Iași (2)	Pașcani
11:00 EET (UTC+2)		Report (FRF)		Stadium: CFR; Referee: Aelenei Ciprian; Assistant referees: Hriscu Daniel, Hriscu Vlad

10 November 2019	Csiksereda Miercurea Ciuc (3)	0–2	Vulpițele Galbene Roman (2)	Miercurea Ciuc
11:00 EET (UTC+2)		Report (FRF)		Stadium: Municipal, sintetic Referee: Jakab Tamas; Assistant referees: Incze David, Feleki Boglarka

10 November 2019	Atletic Olimpia Gherla (3)	0–15	Independența Baia Mare (1)	Gherla
11:00 EET (UTC+2)		Report (FRF)		Stadium: Olimpia; Referee: Hurducas Victor; Assistant referees: Muresan Alin Cristian, Pojar Paul Bogdan

10 November 2019	Olimpic Star Cluj (2)	1–5	Piroș Security Arad (1)	Sâncraiu
11:00 EET (UTC+2)		Report (FRF)		Stadium: Voința; Referee: Bodocan Narcis; Assistant referees: Antal Csaba, Giorgiu Claudiu

10 November 2019	Dream Team București (3)	0–6	Universitatea Alexandria (1)	București
11:00 EET (UTC+2)		Report (FRF)		Stadium: Ion Ţiriac; Referee: Valusescu Maria Alexandra; Assistant referees: Ivanov Roxana, Sirghi Raluca

10 November 2019	Activ Slobozia (3)	2–13	Fair Play București (1)	Slobozia
12:00 EET (UTC+2)		Report (FRF)		Stadium: Teren Bucu; Referee: Porumbel Valentin; Assistant referees: Neagu Gabriel, Bitan Ionut

10 November 2019	CSM Târgu Mureș (2)	0–3 (awd.)	Student Sport Alba Iulia (3)	Târgu Mureș
15:00 EET (UTC+2)		Report (FRF)		Stadium: Trans-Sil, sintetic Referee: Ștef Claudiu; Assistant referees: Gaspar Vladut, Cozma Alexandru

10 November 2019	Carmen București (2)	4–2	CSȘ Târgoviște (1)	București
17:00 EET (UTC+2)		Report (FRF)		Stadium: Ion Ţiriac; Referee: Valusescu Maria Alexandra; Assistant referees: Ivanov Roxana, Sirghi Raluca

20 November 2019	Nicu Gane Fălticeni (2)	0–2	Heniu Prundu Bârgăului (1)	Fălticeni
12:00 EET (UTC+2)		Report (FRF)		Stadium: Tineretului; Referee: Ostaficiuc Adrian Gheorghe; Assistant referees: Blănariu Alexandru, Pișta Andrei

20 November 2019	Colţea 1920 Braşov (3)	0–10	Vasas Femina Odorhei (1)	Tărlungeni
12:00 EET (UTC+2)		Report (FRF)		Stadium: Unirea; Referee: Ciucanu Octavian; Assistant referees: Boncz Gabriel, Pânzaru Viorel

== Third round/ Round of 16 ==
The 8 matches were scheduled to be played on 29 February. However, only 7 games were played, as one was postponed to initially to 14 March, then indefinitely, due to the 2019-20 coronavirus pandemic.

29 February 2020	Carmen București (2)	2–2 (a.e.t.) (6–5 p)	Fair Play București (1)	București
11:00 EET (UTC+2)		Report (FRF)		Stadium: Ion Ţiriac; Referee: Trandafir Cristina Mariana; Assistant referees: Sirghi Raluca, Crăciun Mădălina

29 February 2020	Luceafărul Filiași (1)	0–5	Universitatea Alexandria (1)	Filiași
11:00 EET (UTC+2)		Report (FRF)		Stadium: Orășenesc; Referee: Iacob Costinel; Assistant referees: Tudor Razvan Claudiu, Barbu Pompiliu Costinel

29 February 2020	Navobi Iași (2)	1–4	Vulpițele Galbene Roman (2)	Iași
11:00 EET (UTC+2)		Report (FRF)		Stadium: Emil Alexandrescu, sintetic Referee: Aelenei Ciprian; Assistant referees: Puscasu Ana, Iftime Alexandru

29 February 2020	U Olimpia Cluj (1)	5–1	Independența Baia Mare (1)	Iclod
11:00 EET (UTC+2)		Report (FRF)		Stadium: Iclod Arena; Referee: Moca Rares; Assistant referees: Tănăsuc Andra, Revnic Alin

29 February 2020	Student Sport Alba Iulia (1)	1–9	Piroș Security Arad (1)	Alba-Iulia
13:00 EET (UTC+2)		Report (FRF)		Stadium: Cetate; Referee: Boldea Ioan; Assistant referees: Crisan Paula, Popa Andreea

29 February 2020	Vasas Femina Odorhei (1)	1–2	Heniu Prundu Bârgăului (1)	Odorheiu Secuiesc
13:00 EET (UTC+2)		Report (FRF)		Stadium: Municipal, sintetic Referee: Apetrei Cosmin; Assistant referees: Cercel Cosmin, Andrei Ionut Razvan

29 February 2020	Selena ȘN Constanța (1)	2–3	Universitatea Galați (1)	Constanța
14:00 EET (UTC+2)		Report (FRF)		Stadium: SNC; Referee: Lică Iurgen Ciprian; Assistant referees: Carson Marian, Tanase Cristian

14 March 2020	Banat Girls Reșița (2)	cancelled	Fortuna Becicherecu Mic (1)	Reșița
15:00 EET (UTC+2)		Report (FRF)		Stadium: Gloria
