= 2018–19 Cupa României (women's football) =

2018–19 Cupa României Feminin
Cupa României 2018–19
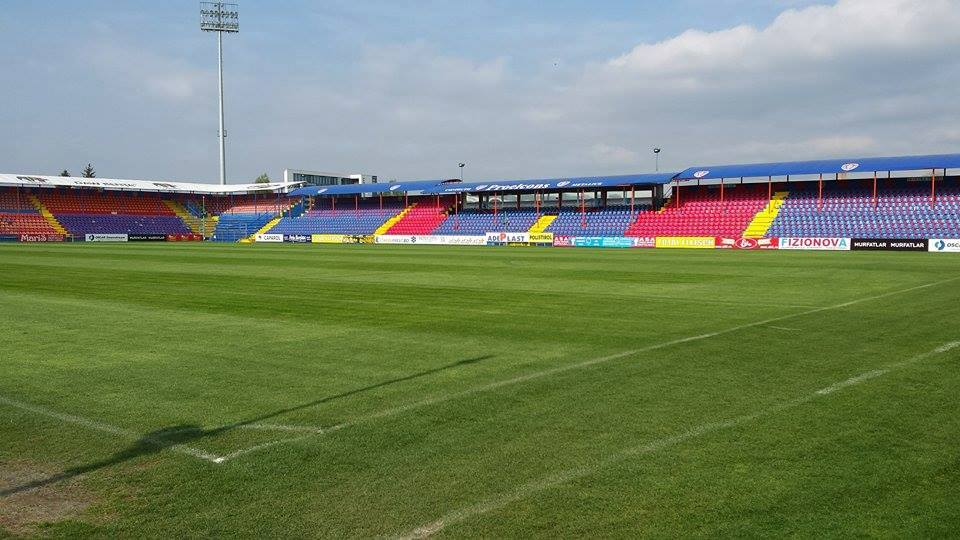

Tournament details
- Country: Romania
- Teams: 37

Final positions
- Champions: Vasas Femina Odorhei
- Runners-up: Fortuna Becicherecu Mic

Tournament statistics
- Matches played: 36

The 2018–19 Cupa României was the 16th season of the annual official Romanian women's football knockout tournament.

== Participating clubs ==
The following 37 teams qualified for the competition:

2018–19 Liga I without 1 dissolved club (9)	2018–19 Liga II without 2 second teams (14)	2018–19 Liga III without 3 second teams and 1 third team (14)
entering in second round: Fair Play București; Fortuna Becicherecu Mic; Heniu Prundu Bârgăului; U Olimpia Cluj; Universitatea Galați; Independența Baia Mare; Universitatea Alexandria; Vasas Femina Odorhei; entering in third round / round of 16: CSȘ Târgoviște	entering in second round: Ladies Târgu Mureş; Măgura 2012 Bacău; Navobi Iași; Onix Râmnicu Sărat; Selena ȘN Constanța; Viitorul Reghin; Vulpițele Galbene Roman; Venus Maramureș; CS Ineu; Luceafărul Filiași; Olimpic Star Cluj; Piroș Security Arad; Sporting Lugaș; Banat Girls Reșița	entering in first round: Atletic Drobeta-Turnu-Severin; Dream Team București; Carmen București; Dunărea Giurgiu; Progresul Bucureşti; Activ Slobozia; Nicu Gane Fălticeni; FC Onești; CSM Pașcani; Zimbrul Tulcea; Atletic Olimpia Gherla; Csiksereda Miercurea Ciuc; Juventus Timișoara; CSM Târgu Mureș

== Round dates ==
Round	First match date	Reference date	Last match date
First round	14 October 2018		
Second round	25 October 2018	28 October 2018	18 November 2018
Third round / round of 16	18 November 2018	21 November 2018	9 December 2018
Quarter-finals	13 March 2019	27 March 2019	
Semi-finals	15 May 2019		
Final	31 May 2019		

== First round ==
14 Liga III teams entered the competition for the first round. The 7 matches in this round were all scheduled and played on Sunday, 14 October.

14 October 2018	Carmen București (3)	6–0	Dream Team București (3)	București
11:00 EEST (UTC+3)		Report (FRF)		Stadium: Ion Ţiriac; Referee: Ene Mihai Laurențiu; Assistant referees: Murariu Alexandru, Turcu George

14 October 2018	Dunărea Giurgiu (3)	7–2	Progresul Bucureşti (3)	Giurgiu
11:00 EEST (UTC+3)		Report (FRF)		Stadium: Marin Anastasovici; Referee: Nanu Ionut Catalin; Assistant referees: Cojocaru Ionut, Barbu Florinel

14 October 2018	Zimbrul Tulcea (3)	4–10	Activ Slobozia (3)	Topolog
11:00 EEST (UTC+3)		Report (FRF)		Stadium: Comunal; Referee: Nedelciu Alin; Assistant referees: Badiceanu Grigore Gabriel, Rusu Silviu

14 October 2018	Dunărea Giurgiu (3)	4–0	Dream Team București (3)	Fălticeni
11:00 EEST (UTC+3)		Report (FRF)		Stadium: Tineretului; Referee: Cordureanu Andrei; Assistant referees: Blănariu Alexandru, Pintilii Bogdan

14 October 2018	Atletic Olimpia Gherla (3)	1–5	CSM Târgu Mureș (3)	Gherla
11:00 EEST (UTC+3)		Report (FRF)		Stadium: Olimpia; Referee: Rodina Vasile; Assistant referees: Todea Anghel, Suciu George

14 October 2018	Csiksereda Miercurea Ciuc (3)	11–0	FC Onești (3)	Miercurea Ciuc
11:00 EEST (UTC+3)		Report (FRF)		Stadium: Municipal, sintetic Referee: Fazakas Kalman; Assistant referees: Tamasi Zoltan, Feleki Boglarka

14 October 2018	Juventus Timișoara (3)	4–0	Atletic Drobeta-Turnu-Severin (3)	Timișoara
13:30 EEST (UTC+3)		Report (FRF)		Stadium: Colterm; Referee: Roata Valentin; Assistant referees: Cismas Malac Roxana, Sandu Patrik-Stefan

== Second round ==
The 7 teams that advanced from the first round were joined by most of the remaining teams: 14 Liga II teams and 8 Liga I teams, for a total of 29 teams playing 14 matches, while one received a bye. The matches were scheduled to be played on or around 28 October. Two were played in advance, on 25 and 27 October 2019, while two were scheduled on 31 October and two more were postponed for later, on 17 and 18 November. 8 games were played on the original scheduled day of 28 October.

25 October 2018	Venus Maramureș (2)	0–8	Independența Baia Mare (1)	Satulung
16:00 EEST (UTC+3)		Report (FRF)		Stadium: Satulung; Referee: Codrea Cristian; Assistant referees: Husti Ionut Mircea, Muresan Bogdan

27 October 2018	Nicu Gane Fălticeni (2)	0–4	Heniu Prundu Bârgăului (1)	Fălticeni
14:00 EEST (UTC+3)		Report (FRF)		Stadium: Tineretului; Referee: Iftode Silviu; Assistant referees: Pintilii Bogdan, Vasiliu Andra

28 October 2018	Luceafărul Filiași (2)	0–3	Universitatea Alexandria (1)	Işalniţa
11:00 EEST (UTC+3)		Report (FRF)		Stadium: Comunal; Referee: Filip Claudiu Andrei; Assistant referees: Banica Octavian Marian, Luica Ionut Cristinel

28 October 2018	Carmen București (2)	2–0	Onix Râmnicu Sărat (2)	București
11:00 EEST (UTC+3)		Report (FRF)		Stadium: Ion Ţiriac; Referee: Ene Andreea; Assistant referees: Calin Daniel, Sirghi Raluca

28 October 2018	Măgura 2012 Bacău (2)	1–4	Universitatea Galați (1)	Bacău
11:00 EEST (UTC+3)		Report (FRF)		Stadium: Lucreţiu Avram; Referee: Trefas Alina; Assistant referees: Ailioaiei Ionut, Tulbure Andrei

28 October 2018	Vulpițele Galbene Roman (2)	1–3	Navobi Iași (2)	Roman
11:00 EEST (UTC+3)		Report (FRF)		Stadium: Moldova; Referee: Diaconu Marius; Assistant referees: Țăranu Vlad, Mocanu Alexandru

28 October 2018	CSM Târgu Mureș (3)	7–0	Viitorul Reghin (2)	Târgu Mureş
11:00 EEST (UTC+3)		Report (FRF)		Stadium: Trans-Sil; Referee: Andrei Florin; Assistant referees: Matei Radu, Gaspar Vladut

28 October 2018	Sporting Lugaș (2)	0–3	Olimpic Star Cluj (2)	Paleu
11:00 EEST (UTC+3)		Report (FRF)		Stadium: Comunal; Referee: Omuţ Marius; Assistant referees: Caliman Patrik, Man Catalin

28 October 2018	CS Ineu (2)	4–11	Piroș Security Arad (2)	Ineu
11:00 EEST (UTC+3)		Report (FRF)		Stadium: Central; Referee: Jurca Tudor Florin; Assistant referees: Pantea Andrei, Stanciu Mihai Vladut

28 October 2018	Csiksereda Miercurea Ciuc (3)	0–9	Vasas Femina Odorhei (1)	Miercurea Ciuc
13:00 EEST (UTC+3)		Report (FRF)		Stadium: Municipal; Referee: Biro Botond; Assistant referees: Feleki Boglarka, Nagy Zalan

31 October 2018	Banat Girls Reșița (2)	0–3 (awd.)	Fortuna Becicherecu Mic (1)	Reșița
14:30 EEST (UTC+3)		(0–2 susp.); Report (FRF)		Stadium: Gloria; Referee: Svatsinka Roberto; Assistant referees: Gruescu Samuel, Frimu Valentin

31 October 2018	SCM Dunărea 2020 Giurgiu (3)	0–13	Fair Play București (1)	Giurgiu
15:00 EEST (UTC+3)		Report (FRF)		Stadium: Dunărea Port; Referee: Nanu Ionut Catalin; Assistant referees: Roșca Lucian, Barbu Florinel

17 November 2018	Ladies Târgu Mureş (2)	1–6	U Olimpia Cluj (1)	Adrianu Mare
14:00 EET (UTC+2)		Report (FRF)		Stadium: Baza Sportivă Dorman; Referee: Ștef Claudiu; Assistant referees: Bojan Cosmin, Cherteș Cristian Marius

18 November 2018	Activ Slobozia (2)	1–12	Selena ȘN Constanța (2)	Bucu
11:00 EET (UTC+2)		Report (FRF)		Stadium: Comunal; Referee: Buzea Vasile; Assistant referees: Dobre Vasilicā Viorel, Petre Georgian

== Third round / round of 16 ==
18 November 2018	Navobi Iași (2)	0–4	Vasas Femina Odorhei (1)	Iași
11:00 EET (UTC+2)		Report (FRF)		Stadium: Emil Alexandrescu; Referee: Baban Vlad; Assistant referees: Puscasu Ana, Lodbă Andreea

18 November 2018	Carmen București (3)	1–3	Fair Play București (1)	București
14:00 EET (UTC+2)		Report (FRF)		Stadium: Ion Ţiriac; Referee: Părăluță Cristina Elena; Assistant referees: Ivanov Roxana, Crăciun Mădălina

18 November 2018	CSM Târgu Mureș (3)	2–4	Heniu Prundu Bârgăului (1)	Târgu Mureş
14:00 EET (UTC+2)		Report (FRF)		Stadium: Trans-Sil; Referee: Ștef Claudiu; Assistant referees: Gaspar Vladut, Albu Balint

21 November 2018	Juventus Timișoara (3)	0–3 (awd.)	Fortuna Becicherecu Mic (1)	Timișoara
13:00 EET (UTC+2)		(0–2 susp.); Report (FRF)		Stadium: Colterm; Referee: Vărzan Aurel; Assistant referees: Samsudean Patricia, Cismas Malac Roxana

21 November 2018	Olimpic Star Cluj (2)	2–18	U Olimpia Cluj (1)	Cluj-Napoca
13:30 EET (UTC+2)		Report (FRF)		Stadium: Clujana; Referee: Bodocan Narcis; Assistant referees: Mazilu Elena Roxana, Tănăsuc Andra

21 November 2018	Piroș Security Arad (2)	2–3	Independența Baia Mare (1)	Arad
14:00 EET (UTC+2)		Report (FRF)		Stadium: Șega; Referee: Jurca Tudor Florin; Assistant referees: Mihoc Alina, Băla Casian

21 November 2018	Selena ȘN Constanța (2)	0–4	Universitatea Galați (1)	Constanța
14:00 EET (UTC+2)		Report (FRF)		Stadium: ȘNC; Referee: Marcu Claudiu; Assistant referees: Ionus Erchian, Iacob Florin

9 December 2018	CSȘ Târgoviște (1)	1–0	Universitatea Alexandria (1)	Şotânga
13:00 EET (UTC+2)		Report (FRF)		Stadium: Alpan; Referee: Ene Andreea; Assistant referees: Ivanov Roxana, Sirghi Raluca

== Quarter-finals ==
13 March 2019	Universitatea Galați (1)	4–1	CSȘ Târgoviște (1)	Galați
11:00 EET (UTC+2)		Report (FRF)		Stadium: Siderurgistul; Referee: Constantinescu Ionut; Assistant referees: Iftode Florin, Vlase Daniel

24 March 2019	Fortuna Becicherecu Mic (1)	8–0	Heniu Prundu Bârgăului (1)	Becicherecu Mic
11:00 EET (UTC+2)		Report (FRF)		Stadium: Comunal; Referee: Gornic Alexandru Dan; Assistant referees: Berariu Lucian Mihai, Pantea Sebastian

27 March 2019	Fair Play București (1)	0–8	Vasas Femina Odorhei (1)	Ciorogârla
12:00 EET (UTC+2)		Report (FRF)		Stadium: Baza Sportivă Ciorogârla; Referee: Terteleac Ana Maria; Assistant referees: Baltatu Mihai, Istrate Marian

27 March 2019	Independența Baia Mare (1)	1–2	U Olimpia Cluj (1)	Lăpușel
15:00 EET (UTC+2)		Report (FRF)		Stadium: Comunal; Referee: Necrici Razvan; Assistant referees: Lar Daniel Stefan, Muresan Cristian Gheorghe

== Semifinals ==
15 May 2019	Fortuna Becicherecu Mic (1)	2–0	U Olimpia Cluj (1)	Becicherecu Mic
11:00 EEST (UTC+3)		Report (FRF)		Stadium: Comunal; Referee: Popa Sergiu; Assistant referees: Sirbu Aurelian, Nistor Daniel Gheorghe

15 May 2019	Universitatea Galați (1)	1–4	Vasas Femina Odorhei (1)	Galați
11:00 EEST (UTC+3)		Report (FRF)		Stadium: Siderurgistul; Referee: Porumbel Valentin; Assistant referees: Neagu Gabriel, Bitan Ionut

== Final ==
31 May 2019	Fortuna Becicherecu Mic (1)	0–5	Vasas Femina Odorhei (1)	Târgu Mureş
17:00 EEST (UTC+3)		Report (FRF)		Stadium: Trans-Sil; Referee: Demetrescu Iuliana Elena; Assistant referees: Ivanov Roxana, Florea Bianca, Recorean Roxana

Cupa României 2018–19 winners
Vasas Femina Odorhei
1st title
