= 2021–22 Cupa României (women's football) =

2021–22 Cupa României Feminin
Cupa României 2021–22
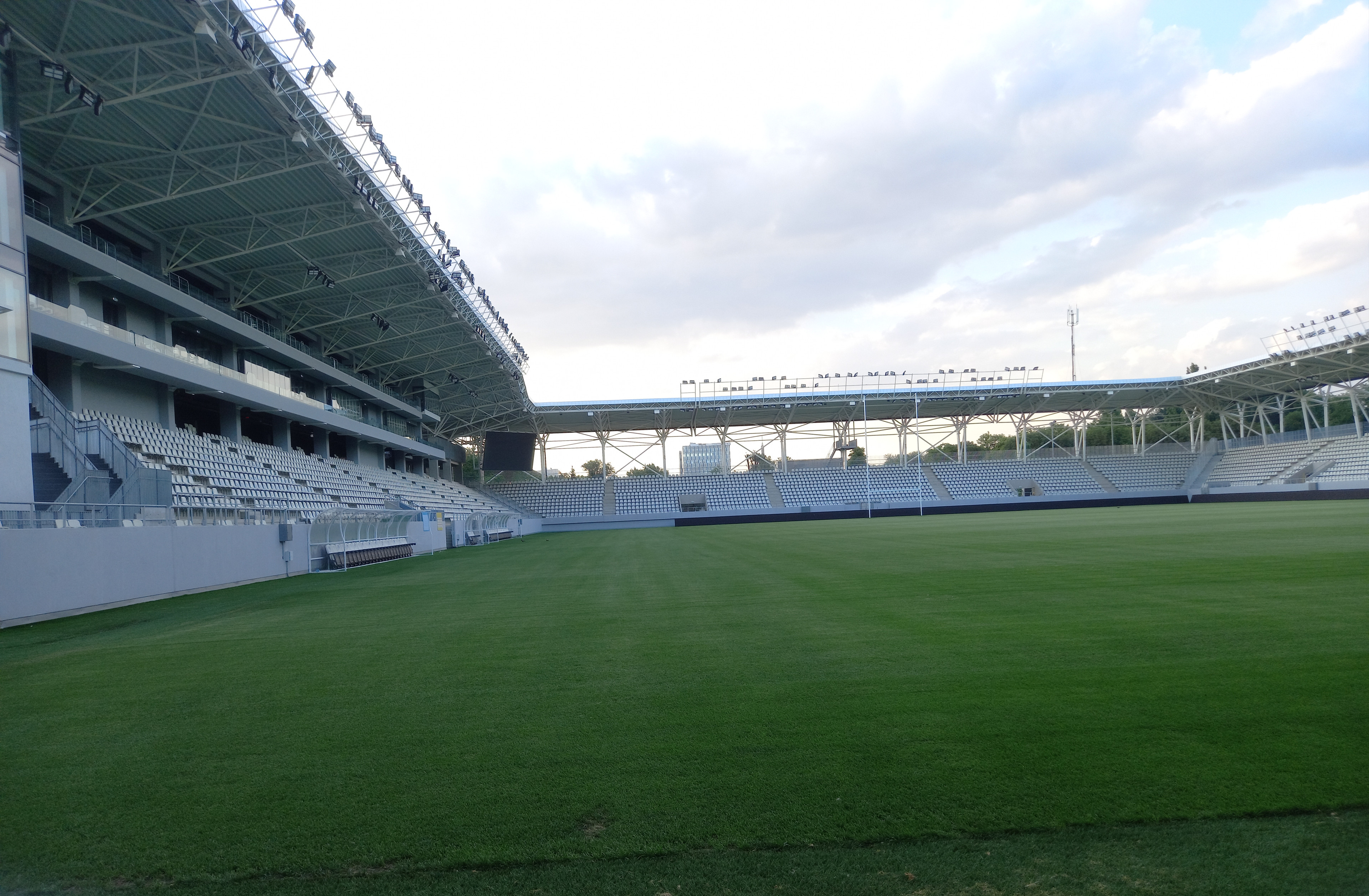

Tournament details
- Country: Romania
- Teams: 36

Final positions
- Champions: U Olimpia Cluj
- Runners-up: Heniu Prundu Bârgăului

Tournament statistics
- Matches played: 35
- Goals scored: 213 (6.09 per match)

The 2021–22 Cupa României was the 19th season of the annual Romanian primary football knockout tournament.

== Participating clubs ==
The following 36 teams qualified for the competition:

2021–22 Liga I all clubs (12)	2021–22 Liga II without 2 second teams and 1 dissolved club (15)	2021–22 Liga III without 3 second teams (9)
entering in Second/ Round of 32: Fair Play București; Politehnica Femina; Heniu Prundu Bârgăului; U Olimpia Cluj; Universitatea Galați; Fotbal Feminin Baia Mare; Universitatea Alexandria; Vasas Femina Odorhei; Piroș Security Arad; Banat Girls Reșița; CSȘ Târgoviște; Ladies Târgu Mureş	entering in Second Round/ Round of 32: Selena ȘN Constanța; Carmen București; Navobi Iași; Nicu Gane Fălticeni; Onix Râmnicu Sărat; Vulpițele Galbene Roman; Atletic Drobeta-Turnu-Severin; Olimpic Star Cluj; United Bihor; Dream Team București; Csiksereda Miercurea Ciuc; Măgura 2012 Bacău; Activ Slobozia; Atletic Olimpia Gherla; Academia de Fotbal şi Tenis Măgura	entering in First round: Colţea 1920 Braşov; Dunărea 2020 Giurgiu; CSM Pașcani; Student Sport Alba Iulia; Sepsi OSK Sfântu Gheorghe; FC Voluntari; Estera Țifești; Juventus Timișoara; entering in Second Round/ Round of 32: Zimbrul Tulcea

== Round dates ==
Round	First match date	Reference date	Last match date
First Round	2 October 2021	3 October 2021	
Second Round/ Round of 32	23 October 2021	17 November 2021	28 November 2021
Round of 16	16 April 2022		27 April 2022
Quarterfinals	11 May 2022		
Semifinals	25 May 2022 (Note: originally scheduled for 1 June 2021)		
Final	5 June 2022		

== First round ==
8 Liga III teams entered the First Round, and the games are scheduled for Sunday, 3 October.

2 October 2021	FC Voluntari (3)	6–4	Dunărea 2020 Giurgiu (3)	Voluntari
12:00 EEST (UTC+3)		Report (FRF)		Stadium: Anghel Iordănescu (sintetic); Referee: Sărăcuță Marian; Assistant referees: Mindeart Theodor, Avram Gabriel

3 October 2021	Sepsi OSK Sfântu Gheorghe (3)	1–9	Colţea 1920 Braşov (3)	Sfântu Gheorghe
10:00 EEST (UTC+3)		Report (FRF)		Stadium: Municipal (teren 2); Referee: Ciorbea Robert; Assistant referees: Boncz Gabriel, Ciorbea Cristian Marian

3 October 2021	Estera Țifești (3)	6–4	CSM Pașcani (3)	Jariștea
13:30 EEST (UTC+3)		Report (FRF)		Stadium: Măgura; Referee: Ungureanu Diana Madalina; Assistant referees: Voicu Cristian, Martinescu Bogdan Mihai

3 October 2021	Student Sport Alba Iulia (3)	3–2	Juventus Timișoara (3)	Alba Iulia
15:00 EEST (UTC+3)		Report (FRF)		Stadium: Cetate; Referee: Marginean Marius; Assistant referees: Nistor Daniel, Spatacean Darius

== Second Round/ Round of 32 ==
The 4 teams that advanced from the First Round will be joined by the remaining teams: one Liga III team, 15 Liga II teams and 12 Liga I teams, for a total of 32 teams playing 16 matches.

23 October 2021	United Bihor (2)	0–7	Fotbal Feminin Baia Mare (1)	Tileagd
14:00 EEST (UTC+3)		Report (FRF)		Stadium: Foresta; Referee: Popa Adina Claudia; Assistant referees: Gozman Pop Cristian Dumitru, Belenesi Alex

17 November 2021	Dream Team București (2)	0–4	Fair Play București (1)	București
11:30 EST (UTC+2)		Report (FRF)		Stadium: Ion Ţiriac; Referee: Spinu Marius; Assistant referees: Spinu Nicolas, Marin Razvan Stefan

17 November 2021	Zimbrul Tulcea (3)	5–7	Universitatea Galați (1)	Topolog
14:00 EST (UTC+2)		Report (FRF)		Stadium: Comunal; Referee: Marcu Claudiu; Assistant referees: Carson Marian, Tanase Cristian

17 November 2021	Activ Slobozia (2)	1–5	Selena ȘN Constanța (2)	Slobozia
14:00 EST (UTC+2)		Report (FRF)		Stadium: Stadionul Abatorul; Referee: Porumbel Valentin; Assistant referees: Neagu Gabriel, Dobre Vasilicā Viorel

17 November 2021	FC Voluntari (3)	0–7	Universitatea Alexandria (1)	Voluntari
14:00 EST (UTC+2)		Report (FRF)		Stadium: Anghel Iordănescu (sintetic); Referee: Buzea Vasile; Assistant referees: Ciocoiu Bogdan, Negru Ioan Alexandru

17 November 2021	Navobi Iași (2)	9–0	Nicu Gane Fălticeni (2)	Iași
14:00 EST (UTC+2)		Report (FRF)		Stadium: Tineretului (sintetic); Referee: Mihuleac Gabriel; Assistant referees: Iftime Alexandru, Macovei Leonard George

17 November 2021	Măgura 2012 Bacău (2)	0–3	Vulpițele Galbene Roman (2)	Bacău
14:00 EST (UTC+2)		Report (FRF)		Stadium: Lucrețiu Avram; Referee: Mavriche Sergiu; Assistant referees: Apostu Alexandra Theodora, Antal Damian

17 November 2021	Colţea 1920 Braşov (3)	0–1	Academia de Fotbal şi Tenis Măgura (2)	Tărlungeni
14:00 EST (UTC+2)		Report (FRF)		Stadium: Unirea; Referee: Ciorbea Robert; Assistant referees: Pavel Cojocaru Andrei, Pânzaru Viorel

17 November 2021	Ladies Târgu Mureş (1)	0–5	Heniu Prundu Bârgăului (1)	Târgu Mureş
14:00 EST (UTC+2)		Report (FRF)		Stadium: Academia de Sport Mureșul; Referee: Ștef Claudiu; Assistant referees: Sîncrăian Andrei, Cherteș Cristian Marius

17 November 2021	Politehnica Femina (1)	0–2	Piroș Security Arad (1)	Timișoara
14:00 EST (UTC+2)		Report (FRF)		Stadium: Stadionul Știința; Referee: Omuţ Marius; Assistant referees: Zifceac Ludovic, Urs George Catalin

17 November 2021	Atletic Drobeta-Turnu-Severin (2)	1–5	Banat Girls Reșița (1)	Drobeta Turnu Severin
14:00 EST (UTC+2)		Report (FRF)		Stadium: Termo; Referee: Balangă Luis Florică; Assistant referees: Ghilă Mihaiță Marian, Sucilă Cristian-Constantin

17 November 2021	Estera Țifești (3)	1–2	Onix Râmnicu Sărat (2)	Jariștea
14:00 EST (UTC+2)		Report (FRF)		Stadium: Măgura; Referee: Fuior Cosmin; Assistant referees: Ichim Cristi Daniel, Voicu Cristian

17 November 2021	Carmen București (2)	6–1	CSȘ Târgoviște (1)	București
14:00 EST (UTC+2)		Report (FRF)		Stadium: Voința; Referee: Oancea Stanica Theodor; Assistant referees: Oancea Sergiu Ciprian, Ivanov Roxana

17 November 2021	Csiksereda Miercurea Ciuc (2)	2–3	Vasas Femina Odorhei (1)	Miercurea Ciuc
14:00 EST (UTC+2)		Report (FRF)		Stadium: Erőss Zolt (sintetic); Referee: Kiss Tamara; Assistant referees: Kopriva Biro Tamas, Năstase Valentin

17 November 2021	Olimpic Star Cluj (2)	0–3	U Olimpia Cluj (1)	Sâncraiu
14:00 EST (UTC+2)		Report (FRF)		Stadium: Voința; Referee: Lunca Dragoș Nicolae; Assistant referees: Pojar Paul Bogdan, Giorgiu Claudiu

28 November 2021	Student Sport Alba Iulia (2)	0–3	Atletic Olimpia Gherla (2)	Alba Iulia
14:00 EST (UTC+2)		Report (FRF)		Stadium: Oarda de Jos; Referee: Boldea Ioan; Assistant referees: Nistor Daniel, Popa Daniel

== Round of 16 ==
The 16 qualified teams played the 8 matches on April 16 and 27.

16 April 2022	Academia de Fotbal şi Tenis Măgura (2)	0–6	Vasas Femina Odorhei (1)	Cisnădie
12:00 EEST (UTC+2)		Report (FRF)		Stadium: Măgura; Referee: Ţiţii Andrei Lucian; Assistant referees: Epure Adrian, Comaniciu Adrian

16 April 2022	Fotbal Feminin Baia Mare (1)	0–9	Heniu Prundu Bârgăului (1)	Baia Mare
17:00 EEST (UTC+2)		Report (FRF)		Stadium: Viorel Mateianu; Referee: Soponar Răzvan Ionut; Assistant referees: Pante Gabriel, Parge Vlad

16 April 2022	Atletic Olimpia Gherla (2)	0–9	U Olimpia Cluj (1)	Gherla
17:00 EEST (UTC+2)		Report (FRF)		Stadium: Olimpia; Referee: Vadana Sorin; Assistant referees: Căpîlna Luca Tudor, Stoica Bogdan Claudiu

16 April 2022	Navobi Iași (2)	3–1	Vulpițele Galbene Roman (2)	Iași
17:00 EEST (UTC+2)		Report (FRF)		Stadium: Emil Alexandrescu II; Referee: Apreutesei Andrei; Assistant referees: Macovei Leonard George, Năcuță Diana

16 April 2022	Onix Râmnicu Sărat (2)	0–10	Fair Play București (1)	Râmnicu Sărat
17:00 EEST (UTC+2)		Report (FRF)		Stadium: Onix; Referee: Drugea Catalin Gheorghe; Assistant referees: Martinescu Bogdan Mihai, Cighir David

16 April 2022	Carmen București (2)	0–1	Universitatea Alexandria (1)	București
17:00 EEST (UTC+2)		Report (FRF)		Stadium: Voința; Referee: Ene Andreea; Assistant referees: Ileana Daniela, Mazga Ilinca

16 April 2022	Banat Girls Reșița (1)	0–3	Piroș Security Arad (1)	Comloșu Mare
17:00 EEST (UTC+2)		Report (FRF)		Stadium: Comunal; Referee: Roman George Catalin; Assistant referees: Humita Ioan Daniel, Cismas Malac Roxana

27 April 2022	Selena ȘN Constanța (2)	2–1	Universitatea Galați (1)	Constanța
17:00 EEST (UTC+2)		Report (FRF)		Stadium: SNC; Referee: Lică Iurgen Ciprian; Assistant referees: Carson Marian, Ionus Erchian

== Quarterfinals ==
The 8 qualified teams played the 4 matches on May 11.

11 May 2022	Selena ȘN Constanța (2)	1–5	Vasas Femina Odorhei (1)	Constanța
10:00 EEST (UTC+2)		Report (FRF)		Stadium: SNC; Referee: Spinu Marius; Assistant referees: Spinu Nicolas, Marin Razvan Stefan

11 May 2022	Universitatea Alexandria (1)	0–8	U Olimpia Cluj (1)	Plosca
11:00 EEST (UTC+2)		Report (FRF)		Stadium: Comunal; Referee: Motan Mihai; Assistant referees: Onicescu Ion, Mincu Stefan

11 May 2022	Fair Play București (1)	0–5	Piroș Security Arad (1)	Ciorogârla
14:00 EEST (UTC+2)		Report (FRF)		Stadium: Baza Sportivă Ciorogârla; Referee: Nanu Ionut Catalin; Assistant referees: Cojocaru Ionut, Barbu Florinel

11 May 2022	Navobi Iași (2)	1–13	Heniu Prundu Bârgăului (1)	Iași
17:00 EEST (UTC+2)		Report (FRF)		Stadium: Emil Alexandrescu II; Referee: Sava Florin Adrian; Assistant referees: Vişan Florian Alexandru, Gîță Daniel Marius

== Quarterfinals ==
The 4 qualified teams played the two matches on May 25.

25 May 2022	U Olimpia Cluj (1)	6–1	Vasas Femina Odorhei (1)	Iclod
11:00 EEST (UTC+2)		Report (FRF)		Stadium: Iclod Arena; Referee: Andrei Florin; Assistant referees: Cozma Alexandru, Gaspar Vladut

25 May 2022	Piroș Security Arad (1)	0–4	Heniu Prundu Bârgăului (1)	Arad
17:30 EEST (UTC+2)		Report (FRF)		Stadium: Sânnicolaul Mic; Referee: Nagy Vladimir Andrei; Assistant referees: Popa Daniel, Nistor Daniel

== Final ==
The final was played on June 5 on the Arcul de Triumf stadium.

5 June 2022	Heniu Prundu Bârgăului (1)	2–6	U Olimpia Cluj (1)	Bucharest
13:00 EEST (UTC+2)		Report (FRF)		Stadium: Arcul de Triumf; Referee: Peşu Ionela Alina; Assistant referees: Țepușă Mihaela, Florea Bianca, Gherghi Madalina

Cupa României 2021–22 winners

8th title
