= 2017–18 Liga II (women's football) =

Liga II Feminin
- Season: 2017–18
- Champions: Universitatea Galați; Independența Baia Mare
- Matches played: 112
- Goals scored: 748 (6.68 per match)
- All statistics correct as of 27 August 2019.

The 2017–18 Liga II was the 5th season, since its reintroduction in 2013, of the second level women's football league of the Romanian football league system. Since the previous season, the second tier league was renamed from Liga I to Liga II, since the top tier got renamed again to Liga I. 16 teams divided in 2 series played in the competition that consisted of a double round-robin lasting 14 stages, totaling 112 matches.

== Team changes ==
=== To Liga II ===
Promoted from Liga III (previously called Liga II)

- Onix Râmnicu Sărat (runners-up of 2016–17 Liga II)
- Piroș Security Arad (winners of 2016–17 Liga II)

Relegated from Liga I (previously called Superliga)

- Navobi Iași (runners-up of 2016–17 Superliga, willingly enrolled in Liga II)
- Independența Baia Mare (10th in 2016–17 Superliga)

=== From Liga II (previously called Liga I) ===
Promoted to Liga I

- CS Universitatea Alexandria (winners of 2016–17 Liga I, Seria I)
- Fortuna Becicherecu Mic (runners-up of 2016–17 Liga I, Seria II)

Relegated to Liga III

- CSM Pașcani (8th place in 2016–17 Liga I, Seria I)

Disbanded

- Juniorul Satu Mare (5th place in 2016–17 Liga I, Seria II)

=== Excluded and spared teams ===
Juniorul Satu Mare was disbanded in the summer of 2017, so Ladies Târgu Mureș (8th place in 2016–17 Liga I, Seria II) was spared from relegation.

== Teams ==
Location of clubs in the 2017–18 Liga II Feminin
- Seria I, - Seria II

=== Seria I ===
Club	City	Stadium	Capacity
Armonia Dolhești	Dolhești	Laurentiu Sapaluc, Dolhasca	
Măgura 2012 Bacău	Bacău	Lucrețiu Avram	
Navobi Iași	Iași	Emil Alexandrescu II	1,000
Onix Râmnicu Sărat	Râmnicu Sărat	Onix	
Real 2 Craiova	Craiova	Stadionul Ișalnița, Ișalnița	
Selena ȘN Constanța	Constanța	SNC	
Universitatea Galați	Galați	Stadionul Dunărea	23,000
Viitorul Reghin	Reghin	Avântul	3,200

=== Seria II ===
Club	City	Stadium	Capacity
Independența Baia Mare	Baia Mare	Viorel Mateianu	15,500
CS Ineu	Ineu	Stadionul Ineu	
Ladies Târgu Mureş	Târgu Mureş	Mureşeni	
Olimpia 2 Cluj	Cluj-Napoca	Victoria Someșeni	1,300
Olimpic Star Cluj	Cluj-Napoca	Academia Luceafarul	
Piroș Security Lioness	Arad	Șega	
Sporting Lugaș	Lugașu de Sus	Baza Sportivă PALEU, Oradea	
Vasas 2 Odorhei	Odorheiu Secuiesc	Municipal	5,000

== League tables and Results ==
=== Seria I League table ===
Pos	Team	Pld	W	D	L	GF	GA	GD	Pts	Promotion
1	FC Universitatea Galați	14	13	1	0	78	8	+70	40	Promotion to Liga I
2	Selena ȘN Constanța	14	11	2	1	56	10	+46	35	
3	Onix Râmnicu Sărat	14	7	3	4	32	21	+11	24	
4	Măgura 2012 Bacău	14	6	1	7	51	36	+15	19	
5	Navobi Iași	14	5	0	9	29	43	−14	15	
6	Real 2 Craiova	14	4	2	8	27	57	−30	14	
7	Armonia Dolhești	14	3	1	10	23	59	−36	10	
8	Viitorul Reghin	14	1	2	11	10	72	−62	5	

Updated to match(es) played on May 28, 2017. Source: FRF (in Romanian)
Rules for classification: 1) points; 2) goal difference; 3) number of goals scored.

=== Seria II League table ===
Pos	Team	Pld	W	D	L	GF	GA	GD	Pts	Promotion
1	Independența Baia Mare	14	13	1	0	109	10	+99	40	Promotion to Liga I
2	Vasas 2 Odorhei	14	9	2	3	59	32	+27	29	
3	Olimpia 2 Cluj	14	8	2	4	68	33	+35	26	
4	Piroș Security Lioness	14	8	1	5	76	47	+29	25	
5	Ladies Târgu Mureş	14	4	3	7	53	50	+3	15	
6	Olimpic Star Cluj	14	5	0	9	42	65	−23	15	
7	Sporting Lugaș	14	1	3	10	18	80	−62	6	
8	CS Ineu	14	1	2	11	17	125	−108	5	

Updated to match(es) played on June 11, 2017. Source: FRF (in Romanian)
Rules for classification: 1) points; 2) goal difference; 3) number of goals scored.
