= 2020–21 Liga I (women's football) =

Liga I
- Season: 2020–21
- Country: Romania
- Teams: 12
- Champions: U Olimpia Cluj
- Relegated: Carmen București; Selena ȘN Constanța
- Matches: 126
- Goals: 568 (4.51 per match)
- Top goalscorer: Laura Rus (24)
- Biggest home win: Heniu 15–0 Fair Play (12 September 2020)
- Biggest away win: Carmen 0–14 U Alexandria (26 May 2021)
- Highest scoring: Heniu 15–0 Fair Play (12 September 2020)
- All statistics correct as of 30 May 2021.

The 2020–21 Liga I was the 31st season of the top level women's football league of the Romanian football league system. Since the previous season, the league was supposed to be temporarily expanded from 12 to 14 teams, for just this season, since the 2019–20 Coronavirus pandemic forced an early finish to the 2019–20 women's football season in Romania. As such, the 14 teams would have competed in a double round-robin of 26 stages, for a total of 182 matches. Teams ranked 13th and 14th at the end of the season would have relegated, while those ranked 11th and 12th would have faced two teams from the 2020–21 Liga II in play-offs for the 2021–22 Liga I. Round 1 was scheduled to begin on 23 August 2020, but was postponed until 6 September 2020.

However, as two teams withdrew after the initial program was announced since they were unable to comply with medical protocol, a new draw was performed on 26 August 2020. The two teams: CSȘ Târgoviște and Luceafărul Filiași were enrolled instead in 2020–21 Liga II. Along with this new draw, a decision was made to change the play system: the remaining 12 teams will play a single round-robin for the regular season (totaling 66 matches), after which the first six will enter a double round-robin play-off to decide the champion, while the remaining teams (six) will enter a double round-robin play-out to decide the relegated teams. If no further withdrawals occur, the play-off and play-out will consist of 30 games each, for a grand total of 126 matches overall. Teams ranked 11 and 12 (5 and 6 in the play-out) will relegate directly to the 2021–22 Liga II.

U Olimpia Cluj were the defending champions.

== Team changes ==
=== To Liga I ===
Promoted from Liga II

- Carmen București (winner of 2019–20 Liga II, Seria I)
- Banat Girls Reșița (winner of 2019–20 Liga II, Seria II)

=== From Liga I ===
Relegated/Enrolled in Liga II

- CSȘ Târgoviște (7th place in 2019–20 Liga I)
- Luceafărul Filiași (10th place in 2019–20 Liga I)

=== Excluded and spared teams ===
Fair Play București (11th place in 2019–20 Liga I) and Selena ȘN Constanța (12th place in 2019–20 Liga I) were spared from relegation since the 2019-20 coronavirus pandemic forced an early finish to the 2019–20 women's football season in Romania.

However, CSȘ Târgoviște (7th place in 2019–20 Liga I) and Luceafărul Filiași (10th place in 2019–20 Liga I), despite initially drawn to compete in the current Liga I season, were forced to withdraw and enroll instead in Liga II for being unable to comply with medical protocols.

=== Renamed teams ===
After a reorganisation, Independența Baia Mare was renamed to Fotbal Feminin Baia Mare at the conclusion of the 2019–20 season. The change was approved in the Romanian Football Federation's Executive Committee of 3 August 2020.

== Stadiums by capacity and location ==
Location of teams in 2020–21 Liga I

Club	City	Stadium	Capacity
Banat Girls	Reșița	Mircea Chivu (sintetic) / Voința (Lupac)	
Carmen	București	Ion Ţiriac	
Fair Play	Bucharest	Ciorogârla	1,000
Fortuna	Becicherecu Mic	Comunal (Becicherecu Mic)	500
Heniu	Prundu Bârgăului	Heniu	500
Fotbal Feminin	Baia Mare	Viorel Mateianu	7,000
U Olimpia	Cluj-Napoca	Clujana / Iclod Arena	
Piroș Security	Arad	Sânnicolaul Mic	1,500
Universitatea	Alexandria	Municipal (Alexandria)	5,000
Universitatea	Galați	Siderurgistul	6,000
Selena ȘN	Constanța	SNC	
Vasas Femina	Odorheiu Secuiesc	Municipal (Odorheiu Secuiesc)	5,000

== Regular season ==
=== League table ===
Pos	Team	Pld	W	D	L	GF	GA	GD	Pts	Qualification
1	U Olimpia Cluj	11	11	0	0	56	6	+50	33	Qualification for the Championship round
2	Fortuna Becicherecu Mic	11	8	1	2	44	13	+31	25	Qualification for the Championship round
3	Piroș Security Arad	11	7	2	2	36	13	+23	23	Qualification for the Championship round
4	Vasas Femina Odorhei	11	7	2	2	31	11	+20	23	Qualification for the Championship round
5	Heniu Prundu Bârgăului	11	6	2	3	43	13	+30	20	Qualification for the Championship round
6	Universitatea Galați	11	5	3	3	19	24	−5	18	Qualification for the Championship round
7	Carmen București	11	5	0	6	18	29	−11	15	Qualification for the Relegation round
8	Fotbal Feminin Baia Mare	11	4	1	6	19	31	−12	13	Qualification for the Relegation round
9	Universitatea Alexandria	11	3	1	7	24	35	−11	10	Qualification for the Relegation round
10	Banat Girls Reșița	11	2	0	9	11	37	−26	6	Qualification for the Relegation round
11	Fair Play București	11	2	0	9	10	62	−52	6	Qualification for the Relegation round
12	Selena ȘN Constanța	11	0	0	11	3	40	−37	0	Qualification for the Relegation round

Updated to match(es) played on 12 December 2020. Source: FRF (in Romanian), Soccerway
Rules for classification: 1) Points; 2) Head-to-head points; 3) Head-to-head goal difference; 4) Head-to-head goals scored; 5) Head-to-head away goals scored 6) Goal difference; 7) Goals scored.

=== Results ===
Home \ Away	OLI	UGL	FOR	VAS	PIR	HEN	BMA	UAL	FPB	SEL	CAR	BGR
U Olimpia Cluj	—	—	—	3–1	1–0	1–0	11–0	8–1	—	—	9–2	—
Universitatea Galați	0–7	—	—	2–2	—	—	2–0	3–2	2–0	—	—	—
Fortuna Becicherecu Mic	0–4	5–3	—	2–1	—	—	6–0	—	11–0	—	—	—
Vasas Femina Odorhei	—	—	—	—	1–1	3–0	—	4–1	—	4–0	2–0	3–0^{a}
Piroș Security Arad	—	2–2	2–0	—	—	—	—	—	—	10–0	1–0	4–0
Heniu Prundu Bârgăului	—	2–2	2–2	—	5–1	—	—	4–0	15–0	—	—	—
Fotbal Feminin Baia Mare	—	—	—	1–4	2–3	2–0	—	2–2	—	2–0	6–0	—
Universitatea Alexandria	—	—	0–3	—	2–3	—	—	—	—	2–1	1–2	7–3
Fair Play București	2–5	—	—	1–6	0–9	—	0–3	2–6	—	—	—	—
Selena ȘN Constanța	0–3	0–1	1–7	—	—	1–5	—	—	0–1	—	—	0–1
Carmen București	—	3–0	0–3	—	—	0–6	—	—	3–1	4–0	—	4–0
Banat Girls Reșița	0–4	1–2	0–5	—	—	1–4	3–1	—	2–3	—	—	—

Updated to match(es) played on 12 December 2020. Source: Liga I Feminin
Legend: Blue = home team win; Yellow = draw; Red = away team win.

^{a} awarded (game not played)

== Championship play-offs ==
The top six teams from Regular season will meet twice (10 matches per team) for deciding the league champion and the participant in the 2021–22 UEFA Women's Champions League. Teams start the Championship round with their points from the Regular season, but no other records carried over.

=== Play-off table ===
Pos	Team	Pld	W	D	L	GF	GA	GD	Pts	Qualification
1	U Olimpia Cluj (C)	10	9	1	0	36	6	+30	61	Qualification for the Champions League first round
2	Heniu Prundu Bârgăului	10	7	1	2	25	21	+4	42	
3	Piroș Security Arad	10	5	1	4	16	21	−5	39	
4	Fortuna Becicherecu Mic	10	3	1	6	17	20	−3	35	
5	Vasas Femina Odorhei	10	2	1	7	10	18	−8	30	
6	Universitatea Galați	10	1	1	8	6	24	−18	22	

Source: Liga I Feminin
Rules for classification: 1) Points; 2) Head-to-head points; 3) Head-to-head goal difference; 4) Head-to-head goals scored; 5) Head-to-head away goals scored 6) Goal difference; 7) Goals scored.
(C) Champions

=== Results ===
Home \ Away	OLI	FOR	PIR	VAS	HEN	UGL
U Olimpia Cluj	—	3–1	3–1	2–1	10–1	3–0
Fortuna Becicherecu Mic	1–2	—	1–3	2–0	3–7	6–1
Piroș Security Arad	0–4	3–2	—	4–2	1–1	2–1
Vasas Femina Odorhei	0–3	0–0	4–0	—	0–2	0–3^{a}
Heniu Prundu Bârgăului	1–6	1–0	3–1	1–0	—	5–0
Universitatea Galați	0–0	0–1	0–1	1–3	0–3	—

Updated to match(es) played on 30 May 2021. Source: Liga I Feminin
Legend: Blue = home team win; Yellow = draw; Red = away team win.

^{a} awarded (game not played)

== Championship play-out ==
The bottom six teams from Regular season will meet twice (10 matches per team) for deciding the two relegated teams to the 2021–22 Liga II. Teams start the Play-off round with their points from the Regular season, but no other records carried over.

=== Play-out table ===
Pos	Team	Pld	W	D	L	GF	GA	GD	Pts	Qualification
7	Universitatea Alexandria	10	7	2	1	47	16	+31	33	
8	Fair Play București	10	7	1	2	34	17	+17	28	
9	Fotbal Feminin Baia Mare	10	4	1	5	13	14	−1	26	
10	Banat Girls Reșița	10	6	1	3	28	16	+12	25	
11	Carmen București (R)	10	0	1	9	9	47	−38	16	Relegated to the 2021–22 Liga II
12	Selena ȘN Constanța (R)	10	2	2	6	13	34	−21	8	Relegated to the 2021–22 Liga II

Source: Liga I Feminin
Rules for classification: 1) Points; 2) Head-to-head points; 3) Head-to-head goal difference; 4) Head-to-head goals scored; 5) Head-to-head away goals scored 6) Goal difference; 7) Goals scored.
(R) Relegated

=== Results ===
Home \ Away	CAR	BMA	UAL	BGR	FPB	SEL
Carmen București	—	1–2	0–14	2–5	0–3	3–3
Fotbal Feminin Baia Mare	3–0^{a}	—	1–1	1–0	0–2	4–1
Universitatea Alexandria	5–1	1–0	—	2–1	3–3	8–0
Banat Girls Reșița	2–0	6–2	3–4	—	5–3	4–1
Fair Play București	8–1	1–0	6–4	0–1	—	4–1
Selena ȘN Constanța	2–1	1–0	1–5	1–1	2–4	—

Updated to match(es) played on 30 May 2021. Source: Liga I Feminin
Legend: Blue = home team win; Yellow = draw; Red = away team win.

^{a} awarded (game not played)

== Season statistics ==
=== Scoring ===
Updated to match(es) played on 30 June 2021. Source: frf.ro

==== Top scorers ====
Rank	Player	Club	Goals
1	(Romania) Laura Rus	Fortuna Becicherecu Mic	24
2	(Romania) Mihaela Ciolacu	U Olimpia Cluj	20
3	(Romania) Melisa Olariu	Piroș Security Arad	19
4	(Romania) Mădălina Boroș	Heniu Prundu Bârgăului	18
5	(Romania) Valentina Petre	Fair Play București	16
6–7	(Romania) Ioana Bălăceanu	U Olimpia Cluj	15
6–7	(Moldova) Carolina Țabur	U Olimpia Cluj	15
8–9	(Romania) Krisztina Benő	Vasas Femina Odorhei	13
8–9	(Romania) Adelina Ion	Banat Girls Reșița	13
10–11	(Romania) Carolina Solonca	Fair Play București	12
10–11	(Romania) Andreea Laiu	Heniu Prundu Bârgăului	12
12–14	(Romania) Nicoleta Bărbos	Carmen București	11
12–14	(Romania) Cristina Tudorache	Universitatea Alexandria	11
12–14	(Romania) Otilia Durlă	Universitatea Alexandria	11
15–16	(Romania) Rita Mitri	Vasas Femina Odorhei	10
15–16	(Romania) Elena Frîncu	Universitatea Alexandria	10
17–19	(Romania) Cristina Sucilă	Piroș Security Arad	9
17–19	(Romania) Daniela Preda	Fair Play București	9
17–19	(Romania) Mihaela Merlan	Heniu Prundu Bârgăului	9
20–23	(Romania) Andreea Corduneanu	Heniu Prundu Bârgăului	8
20–23	(Romania) Roxana Mirea	U Olimpia Cluj	8
20–23	(Romania) Alexandra Nica	Universitatea Alexandria	8
20–23	(Romania) Andreea Diță	Universitatea Alexandria	8
24–26	(Azerbaijan) Nazlıcan Parlak	Piroș Security Arad	7
24–26	(Romania) Bianca Ienovan	Fortuna Becicherecu Mic	7
24–26	(Romania) Alexandra Hornea	Heniu Prundu Bârgăului	7
27–31	(Romania) Carmen Marcu	U Olimpia Cluj	6
27–31	(Serbia) Stefanija Roksa	Banat Girls Reșița	6
27–31	(Romania) Oana Dumitrache	Universitatea Alexandria	6
27–31	(Romania) Andra Olaru	Universitatea Alexandria	6
27–31	(Romania) Iulia Săvescu	Universitatea Alexandria	6
32–39	(Romania) Denisa Predoi	Fotbal Feminin Baia Mare	5
32–39	(Romania) Ana Palaghia	Heniu Prundu Bârgăului	5
32–39	(Romania) Monica Bențoiu	Universitatea Galați	5
32–39	(Romania) Kinga Barabási	Vasas Femina Odorhei	5
32–39	(Romania) Ana Vlădulescu	Vasas Femina Odorhei	5
32–39	(Romania) Cristina Sandu	Carmen București	5
32–39	(Romania) Shaira Pera	Fortuna Becicherecu Mic	5
32–39	(Romania) Cosmina Dușa	Fortuna Becicherecu Mic	5
40–47	(Moldova) Ana Arnăutu	Universitatea Galați	4
40–47	(Romania) Melisa Șodinca	Fortuna Becicherecu Mic	4
40–47	(Ukraine) Valeriya Postol	Universitatea Galați	4
40–47	(Romania) Mara Bâtea	U Olimpia Cluj	4
40–47	(Romania) Oana Negrea	U Olimpia Cluj	4
40–47	(Moldova) Cristina Cerescu	U Olimpia Cluj	4
40–47	(Romania) Elena Ruvila	Banat Girls Reșița	4
40–47	(Romania) Adina Borodi	U Olimpia Cluj	4
48–67	20 players		3
68–89	22 players		2
90–124	35 players		1
8 owngoals
9 awarded

==== Hat-tricks ====
Player	For	Against	Result	Date
(Romania) Ioana Bălăceanu	U Olimpia Cluj	Universitatea Galați	7–0 (A)	12 September 2020
(Romania) Andreea Laiu	Heniu Prundu Bârgăului	Fair Play București	15–0 (H)	12 September 2020
(Romania) Mihaela Merlan^{4}	Heniu Prundu Bârgăului	Fair Play București	15–0 (H)	12 September 2020
(Romania) Laura Rus	Fortuna Becicherecu Mic	Selena ȘN Constanța	7–1 (A)	26 September 2020
(Romania) Andreea Laiu	Heniu Prundu Bârgăului	Banat Girls Reșița	4–1 (A)	26 September 2020
(Romania) Mihaela Ciolacu	U Olimpia Cluj	Universitatea Alexandria	8–1 (H)	27 September 2020
(Azerbaijan) Nazlıcan Parlak	Piroș Security Arad	Fair Play București	9–0 (A)	27 September 2020
(Romania) Otilia Durlă^{4}	Universitatea Alexandria	Fair Play București	6–2 (A)	7 October 2020
(Romania) Laura Rus^{4}	Fortuna Becicherecu Mic	Fair Play București	11–0 (H)	11 October 2020
(Romania) Bianca Ienovan	Fortuna Becicherecu Mic	Fair Play București	11–0 (H)	11 October 2020
(Romania) Andreea Corduneanu	Heniu Prundu Bârgăului	Selena ȘN Constanța	5–1 (A)	18 October 2020
(Romania) Laura Rus	Fortuna Becicherecu Mic	Universitatea Galați	5–3 (H)	7 November 2020
(Moldova) Carolina Țabur	U Olimpia Cluj	Carmen București	9–2 (H)	14 November 2020
(Romania) Mădălina Boroș^{5}	Heniu Prundu Bârgăului	Carmen București	6–0 (A)	18 November 2020
(Romania) Melisa Olariu^{6}	Piroș Security Arad	Selena ȘN Constanța	10–0 (H)	19 November 2020
(Romania) Valentina Petre^{5}	Fair Play București	Carmen București	8–1 (H)	14 March 2021
(Romania) Mădălina Boroș	Heniu Prundu Bârgăului	Universitatea Galați	5–0 (H)	14 March 2021
(Romania) Ioana Bălăceanu^{4}	U Olimpia Cluj	Heniu Prundu Bârgăului	11–1 (H)	21 March 2021
(Romania) Mihaela Ciolacu	U Olimpia Cluj	Heniu Prundu Bârgăului	11–1 (H)	21 March 2021
(Romania) Carolina Solonca^{4}	Fair Play București	Universitatea Alexandria	6–4 (H)	18 April 2021
(Serbia) Stefanija Roksa	Banat Girls Reșița	Fair Play București	5–3 (H)	5 May 2021
(Romania) Cristina Tudorache	Universitatea Alexandria	Banat Girls Reșița	3–4 (A)	16 May 2021
(Romania) Andreea Diță^{4}	Universitatea Alexandria	Carmen București	14–0 (A)	26 May 2021
(Romania) Mădălina Boroș	Heniu Prundu Bârgăului	Fortuna Becicherecu Mic	7–3 (A)	30 May 2021

Notes

^{4} Player scored 4 goals
^{5} Player scored 5 goals
^{6} Player scored 6 goals
(H) – Home team
(A) – Away team
