= 2017–18 Liga I (women's football) =

Liga I
- Season: 2017–18
- Country: Romania
- Teams: 10
- Champions: Olimpia Cluj (8th title)
- Relegated: Târgu Mureș; Real Craiova
- Women's UCL: Olimpia Cluj
- Matches: 90
- Goals: 442 (4.91 per match)
- Biggest home win: Olimpia 12–1 CSȘ; Olimpia 12–1 Real
- Biggest away win: Fortuna 1–11 Olimpia
- Highest scoring: Olimpia 12–1 CSȘ; Olimpia 12–1 Real
- Longest winning run: 18 matches: Olimpia Cluj
- Longest unbeaten run: 18 matches: Olimpia Cluj
- Longest winless run: 14 matches: Real Craiova
- Longest losing run: 10 matches: Târgu Mureș
- All statistics correct as of 3 June 2018.

The 2017–18 season of Romania's top level women's football league was again called Liga I, after four seasons in which it was named Superliga. It is the 28th season of top-level football and will decide the Romanian champions and UEFA Women's Champions League participant.

Olimpia Cluj won the title.

== Team changes ==
=== To Liga I ===
Promoted from Liga II

- Universitatea Alexandria
- Fortuna Becicherecu Mic

=== From Liga I ===
Relegated to Liga II

- Navobi Iași
- Independența Baia Mare

== Stadiums by capacity and location ==
Location of teams in 2018–19 Liga I

Club	City	Stadium	Capacity
CFR	Timișoara	CFR	7,000
Fair Play	Bucharest	Politehnica / Ciorogârla	1,000 / 1,000
Fortuna	Becicherecu Mic	Comunal	500
Heniu	Prundu Bârgăului	Heniu	500
Olimpia	Cluj-Napoca	Victoria Someșeni	1,300
Real	Craiova	Oltenia (Ișalnița)	2,000
Târgoviște	Târgoviște	Alpan (Șotânga)	1,000
Târgu Mureș	Târgu Mureș	Trans-Sil	8,200
Universitatea	Alexandria	Municipal	5,000
Vasas Femina	Odorheiu Secuiesc	Municipal	5,000

== League table ==
Pos	Team	Pld	W	D	L	GF	GA	GD	Pts	Qualification
1	Olimpia Cluj (C, Q)	18	18	0	0	109	7	+102	54	Qualification to Women's Champions League
2	Vasas Femina	18	12	3	3	64	23	+41	39	
3	CFR Timișoara	18	11	1	6	54	47	+7	34	
4	Universitatea Alexandria	18	6	7	5	37	25	+12	25	
5	Fair Play București	18	7	3	8	51	50	+1	24	
6	Târgoviște	18	5	5	8	41	52	−11	20	
7	Heniu Prundu Bârgăului	18	5	5	8	25	40	−15	20	
8	Fortuna Becicherecu Mic	18	6	2	10	33	67	−34	20	
9	Târgu Mureș (R)	18	3	3	12	16	44	−28	12 (Note: Târgu Mureș went bankrupt during the winter break and lost all matches from the second part by forfeit.)	Relegation to Liga II
10	Real Craiova (R)	18	2	1	15	12	87	−75	7	Relegation to Liga II

Updated to match(es) played on 3 June 2018. Source: FRF (in Romanian), Soccerway
Rules for classification: 1) Points; 2) Head-to-head points; 3) Head-to-head goal difference; 4) Head-to-head goals scored; 5) Head-to-head away goals scored 6) Goal difference; 7) Goals scored.
(C) Champions; (Q) Qualified for the phase indicated; (R) Relegated

== Season results ==
Home \ Away	CFR	FPB	FOR	HEN	OLI	REA	TGV	TGM	UAL	VAS
CFR Timișoara		4–1	1–2	5–2	0–10	9–0	2–2	3–0	2–1	5–2
Fair Play București	4–5		3–1	0–0	0–6	3–0	4–3	3–0	3–3	5–5
Fortuna Becicherecu Mic	0–2	4–6		0–5	1–11	8–0	2–2	1–4	2–0	1–3
Heniu Prundu Bârgăului	2–3	3–1	2–2		0–6	0–3	1–0	3–0	0–0	0–1
Olimpia Cluj	7–1	5–2	10–0	4–0		12–1	12–1	3–0	6–0	6–0
Real Craiova	0–5	0–8	1–3	0–3	0–1		1–6	1–1	0–3	1–5
Târgoviște	1–5	1–4	2–3	11–1	0–3	5–1		3–0	1–1	1–1
Târgu Mureș	4–1	4–3	0–3	1–1	0–3	0–3	1–2		1–1	0–3
Universitatea Alexandria	5–1	3–0	7–0	1–1	1–3	7–0	0–0	3–0		1–1
Vasas Femina	4–0	3–1	8–0	2–1	0–1	8–0	10–0	4–0	4–0	

Updated to match(es) played on 3 June 2018. Source: Liga I Feminin
Legend: Blue = home team win; Yellow = draw; Red = away team win.

== Season positions by round ==
Team ╲ Round	1	2	3	4	5	6	7	8	9	10	11	12	13	14	15	16	17	18
CFR Timișoara	3	1	4	2	2	2	2	2	2	2	2	3	2	2	2	3	3	3
Fair Play București	9	5	3	6	6	7	6	6	4	6	4	4	4	4	4	4	4	5
Fortuna Becicherecu Mic	8	10	10	10	10	10	10	10	10	9	9	9	8	8	7	8	8	8
Heniu Prundu Bârgăului	10	9	9	9	9	8	7	8	7	5	6	7	7	6	5	7	7	7
Olimpia Cluj	1	2	1	1	1	1	1	1	1	1	1	1	1	1	1	1	1	1
Real Craiova	2	4	8	8	8	9	9	9	9	10	10	10	10	10	10	10	10	10
Târgoviște	4	6	6	4	4	5	8	7	8	7	8	6	5	7	6	5	6	6
Târgu Mureș	7	8	5	7	7	4	4	4	5	4	7	8	9	9	9	9	9	9
Universitatea Alexandria	5	7	7	5	5	6	5	5	6	8	5	5	6	5	8	6	5	4
Vasas Femina	6	3	2	3	3	3	3	3	3	3	3	2	3	3	3	2	2	2
