= 2016–17 Liga I (women's football) =

Liga I Feminin
- Season: 2016–17
- Champions: Universitatea Alexandria; Olimpia 2 Cluj
- Matches played: 112
- Goals scored: 615 (5.49 per match)
- All statistics correct as of 10 April 2020.

The 2016–17 Liga I was the fourth season, since its reintroduction in 2013, of the second level women's football league of the Romanian football league system. As a third tier league was created this season, the number of teams was limited to 16. As such, 16 teams divided in 2 series played in the competition that consisted of a double round-robin lasting 14 stages, totaling 112 matches.

== Team changes ==
=== To Liga I ===
New founded teams

- Vasas Femina Odorhei 2

=== From Liga I ===
Promoted to the 2016–17 Superliga

- CSȘ Târgoviște (winners of the 2015–16 Liga I, Seria I)
- CFR Timișoara (winners of the 2015–16 Liga I, Seria II)

Disbanded

- FC Hunedoara (withdrawn after the 2015–16 Liga I)
- Viitorul 2010 Buzău (withdrawn after the 2015–16 Liga I)
- Oțelul Galați (withdrawn during the 2015–16 Liga I)
- Victoria Craiova (withdrawn during the 2015–16 Liga I)

=== Renamed teams ===
Nuova Mama Mia Becicherecu Mic changed its name to Fortuna Becicherecu Mic.

== Teams ==
Location of clubs in the 2016–17 Liga I Feminin
- Seria I, - Seria II

=== Seria I ===
Club	City	Stadium	Capacity
Armonia Dolhești	Dolhești	Laurentiu Sapaluc, Dolhasca	
Măgura 2012 Bacău	Bacău	Lucrețiu Avram	
CSM Pașcani	Pașcani	CFR (Pașcani)	3,500
Real 2 Craiova	Craiova	Comunal (Mischii)	
Selena SN Constanța	Constanța	SNC	
Universitatea Alexandria	Alexandria	Municipal (Roșiorii de Vede) / Comunal (Buzescu)	
Universitatea Galați	Galați	Dunărea	23,000
Viitorul Reghin	Reghin	Avântul	3,200

=== Seria II ===
Club	City	Stadium	Capacity
Fortuna Becicherecu Mic	Becicherecu Mic	Comunal (Becicherecu Mic)	500
CS Ineu	Ineu	Stadionul Ineu	
Juniorul Satu Mare	Satu Mare	Stadionul Someșul	
Ladies Târgu Mureş	Târgu Mureş	Mureşeni	
Olimpia 2 Cluj	Cluj-Napoca	Victoria Someșeni	1,300
Olimpic Star Cluj	Cluj-Napoca	Stadionul CMC / Baza Sportivă Apahida / Victoria Someșeni	
Sporting Lugaș	Lugașu de Sus	Aleşd	
Vasas 2 Odorhei	Odorheiu Secuiesc	Municipal	5,000

== League tables and Results ==
=== Seria I League table ===
Pos	Team	Pld	W	D	L	GF	GA	GD	Pts	Promotion
1	Universitatea Alexandria	14	14	0	0	64	7	+57	42	Promotion to Liga I
2	Viitorul Reghin	14	9	0	5	47	18	+29	27	
3	Selena SN Constanța	14	10	0	4	44	21	+23	30	
4	Armonia Dolhești	14	7	2	5	32	20	+12	23	
5	Universitatea Galați	14	5	2	7	50	38	+12	17	
6	Măgura 2012 Bacău	14	4	1	9	24	36	−12	13	
7	Real 2 Craiova	14	4	1	9	21	55	−34	13	
8	CSM Pașcani	14	0	0	14	4	91	−87	0	

Updated to match(es) played on April 10, 2020. Source: FRF (in Romanian)
Rules for classification: 1) points; 2) goal difference; 3) number of goals scored.

=== Seria II League table ===
Pos	Team	Pld	W	D	L	GF	GA	GD	Pts	Promotion
1	Olimpia 2 Cluj	14	11	0	3	77	24	+53	33	
2	Fortuna Becicherecu Mic	14	11	0	3	65	20	+45	33	Promotion to Liga I
3	Vasas 2 Odorhei	14	10	0	4	50	28	+22	30	
4	Olimpic Star Cluj	14	10	0	4	50	31	+19	30	
5	Juniorul Satu Mare	14	5	2	7	37	52	−15	17	
6	CS Ineu	14	5	1	8	25	41	−16	16	
7	Sporting Lugaș	14	1	1	12	13	51	−38	4	
8	Ladies Târgu Mureş	14	1	0	13	12	82	−70	3	

Updated to match(es) played on April 10, 2020. Source: FRF (in Romanian)
Rules for classification: 1) points; 2) goal difference; 3) number of goals scored.
