= 2021–22 Liga I (women's football) =

Liga I
- Season: 2021–22
- Country: Romania
- Teams: 12
- Champions: U Olimpia Cluj
- Relegated: Heniu Prundu Bârgăului; Selena ȘN Constanța
- All statistics correct as of 6 August 2022.

The 2021–22 Liga I was the 32nd season of the top level women's football league of the Romanian football league system. 12 teams played a one legged-round robin. The top 6 teams progressed then to the play-offs, while the bottom 6 teams to the play-out, where a two-legged round-robin took place. Teams ranked 11 and 12 (5 and 6 in the play-out) would relegate directly to the 2022–23 Liga II.

U Olimpia Cluj were the defending champions.

== Team changes ==
=== To Liga I ===
Promoted from Liga II

- CSȘ Târgoviște (via play-off in 2020–21 Liga II)
- Ladies Târgu Mureș (via play-off in 2020–21 Liga II)

=== From Liga I ===
Relegated to Liga II

- Carmen București (11th place in 2020–21 Liga I)
- Selena ȘN Constanța (12th place in 2020–21 Liga I)

=== Renamed teams ===
While still remaining a separate club, in the summer of 2020, ACS Fortuna Becicherecu Mic signed a partnership with ASU Politehnica Timișoara, as a result of which the male Fortuna team became an unofficial satellite of Politehnica's. Therefore, in the summer of 2021, strengthening the partnership between the two clubs, the Fortuna women's team announced that it would use the Politehnica Timișoara branding starting with the 2021–2022 season.

Following a partnership with the Alexandria municipality, Universitatea Alexandria was renamed as CSM Alexandria. This was achieved by a cession of rights to participate in all competitions from Clubul Sportiv Universitatea Alexandria to Clubul Sportiv Municipal Alexandria.

Due to waning support from authorities of Reșița and Caraș-Severin County, ACS Banat Girls Reșița started a partnership with Comloșu Mare municipality from Timiș County, where they would play all their home matches. As a consequence, the Reșița part of the name was dropped, the team changing its name to just "ACS Banat Girls", thus still continuing to represent the historic Banat region.

== Stadiums by capacity and location ==
Location of teams in 2021–22 Liga I

Club	City	Stadium	Capacity
CSM Alexandria	Alexandria	Municipal (Alexandria)	5,000
Banat Girls	Comloșu Mare	Comunal	
Fair Play	Bucharest	Ciorogârla	1,000
Heniu	Prundu Bârgăului	Heniu	500
Fotbal Feminin	Baia Mare	Viorel Mateianu	7,000
Ladies Târgu Mureş	Târgu Mureş	Academia de Sport Mureşul	
U Olimpia	Cluj-Napoca	Clujana / Iclod Arena	
Piroș Security	Arad	Sânnicolaul Mic	1,500
Politehnica Femina	Timișoara	Stadionul Știința / Baza Poli 2	
Târgoviște	Târgoviște	Alpan (Șotânga)	1,000
Universitatea	Galați	Siderurgistul	6,000
Vasas Femina	Odorheiu Secuiesc	Municipal (Odorheiu Secuiesc)	5,000

== Regular season ==
=== League table ===
Pos	Team	Pld	W	D	L	GF	GA	GD	Pts	Qualification
1	U Olimpia Cluj	11	11	0	0	74	3	+71	33	Qualification for the Championship round
2	Heniu Prundu Bârgăului	11	10	0	1	46	7	+39	30	Qualification for the Championship round
3	CSM Alexandria	11	8	0	3	30	10	+20	24	Qualification for the Championship round
4	Vasas Femina Odorhei	11	7	1	3	31	23	+8	22	Qualification for the Championship round
5	Politehnica Femina	11	6	1	4	40	21	+19	19	Qualification for the Championship round
6	Fair Play București	11	6	1	4	30	17	+13	19	Qualification for the Championship round
7	Piroș Security Arad	11	6	0	5	30	15	+15	18	Qualification for the Relegation round
8	Fotbal Feminin Baia Mare	11	3	2	6	18	33	−15	11	Qualification for the Relegation round
9	Banat Girls Reșița	11	2	1	8	10	43	−33	7	Qualification for the Relegation round
10	Ladies Târgu Mureș	11	2	0	9	18	50	−32	6	Qualification for the Relegation round
11	Universitatea Galați	11	1	0	10	8	58	−50	3	Qualification for the Relegation round
12	Târgoviște	11	1	0	10	6	61	−55	3	Qualification for the Relegation round

Updated to match(es) played on 21 August 2022. Source: FRF (in Romanian), Soccerway
Rules for classification: 1) Points; 2) Head-to-head points; 3) Head-to-head goal difference; 4) Head-to-head goals scored; 5) Head-to-head away goals scored 6) Goal difference; 7) Goals scored.

== Championship play-offs ==
The top six teams from Regular season met twice (10 matches per team) for deciding the league champion and the participant in the 2022–23 UEFA Women's Champions League. Teams start the Championship round with their points from the Regular season, but no other records carried over.

=== Play-off table ===
Pos	Team	Pld	W	D	L	GF	GA	GD	Pts	Qualification
1	U Olimpia Cluj (C)	10	7	3	0	41	5	+36	57	Qualification for the Champions League first round
2	Heniu Prundu Bârgăului (R)	10	7	2	1	28	6	+22	53	Disbanded at end of season
3	Politehnica Femina	10	6	2	2	36	10	+26	39	
4	CSM Alexandria	10	4	1	5	21	28	−7	37	
5	Vasas Femina Odorhei	10	2	0	8	12	34	−22	22	
6	Fair Play București	10	0	0	10	8	63	−55	19	

Source: Liga I Feminin
Rules for classification: 1) Points; 2) Head-to-head points; 3) Head-to-head goal difference; 4) Head-to-head goals scored; 5) Head-to-head away goals scored 6) Goal difference; 7) Goals scored.
(C) Champions; (R) Relegated

== Championship play-out ==
The bottom six teams from Regular season will met (10 matches per team) for deciding the two relegated teams to the 2021–22 Liga II. Teams start the Play-off round with their points from the Regular season, but no other records carried over.

=== Play-out table ===
Pos	Team	Pld	W	D	L	GF	GA	GD	Pts	Qualification
7	Piroș Security Arad	10	9	1	0	52	3	+49	46	
8	Fotbal Feminin Baia Mare	10	6	1	3	22	17	+5	30	
9	Banat Girls Reșița	10	3	5	2	30	19	+11	21	
10	Ladies Târgu Mureș	10	4	2	4	20	25	−5	20	
11	Universitatea Galați	10	2	0	8	14	35	−21	9	Spared from relegation to 2021–22 Liga II
12	Târgoviște (R)	10	1	1	8	7	46	−39	7	Relegated to the 2021–22 Liga II

Source: Liga I Feminin
Rules for classification: 1) Points; 2) Head-to-head points; 3) Head-to-head goal difference; 4) Head-to-head goals scored; 5) Head-to-head away goals scored 6) Goal difference; 7) Goals scored.
(R) Relegated
