= 2011–12 Liga I (women's football) =

Liga I Feminin
- Season: 2011–12
- UEFA Women's Champions League: Olimpia Cluj
- Matches: 192
- Goals: 1,272 (6.63 per match)
- Top goalscorer: Cosmina Dusa (71)
- Biggest home win: FC Municipal Targu Mures 28–0 SN Constanta
- Biggest away win: CS NEGREA Reşiţa 0–19 CFR 1933 Timișoara

The 2011–12 season of the Liga I Feminin was the 22nd season of Romania's premier women's football league. The season started on 4 September 2011 and ended on 6 June 2012. Olimpia Cluj were the defending champions and successfully defended their title on the last matchday.

== Changes from 2010 to 2011 ==
- Seven new clubs entered a team to the league:Independenta Baia Mare, UT Arad, CFR Timișoara, Negrea Resita, Navobi Iasi, CS Viitorul 2010 Buzau and CS Blue Angel Cristian-Brasov.
- As the league now has 20 teams it is divided into eastern and western divisions with 10 teams each. After a double round robin, i.e. 18 matches per team, the top two teams will move on to play the championship round. The first-place finishers get three points right from the start and then a new double round robin is placed. After that the champion qualifies to the 2012–13 UEFA Women's Champions League.

== Teams ==
=== Seria est ===
Location of clubs in Liga I feminin 2011–12, red=eastern division, green=western division

Club	City	Stadium	Capacity
Alice & Tunes Piteşti	Piteşti	Nicolae Dobrin (artificial turf)	1,000
Blue Angel Cristian	Cristian	Cristian	1,000
Brazi	Brazi	Brazi de Sus	1,000
Fair Play București	București	Politehnica	1,000
Metalul Vlăhiţa	Vlăhiţa	Metalul	1,000
Navobi Iași	Iași	Emil Alexandrescu II	1,000
Şantierul Naval Constanţa	Constanţa	SNC	1,000
Târgovişte	Târgovişte	Toma Panţu	1,000
Târgu Mureş	Târgu Mureş	Trans-Sil	8,000
Viitorul 2010 Buzău	Buzău	Cornel Negoescu	3,000

=== Seria vest ===
Club	City	Stadium	Capacity
CFR 1933 Timișoara	Timișoara	CFR	7,000
Clujana	Cluj-Napoca	Clujana	2,000
Independența Baia Mare	Baia Mare	Viorel Mateianu	15,500
Motorul	Oradea	Comunal	1,000
Negrea Reșița	Reșița	Voinţa	1,200
Olimpia	Cluj-Napoca	Ardealul	1,000
Real	Craiova	Electroputere	2,000
Sporting	Craiova	Electroputere	2,000
UTA Arad	Arad	Motorul	1,579
Viitorul Reghin	Reghin	Municipal	3,200

== Standings ==
=== First stage ===
Each team plays 18 games.

==== East ====
Pos	Team	Pld	W	D	L	GF	GA	GD	Pts	Qualification
1	FCM Târgu Mureş	18	18	0	0	151	4	+147	54	Final stage
2	CS Brazi	18	13	2	3	77	21	+56	41	Final stage
3	CS Blue Angel Cristian Braşov	18	11	2	5	53	19	+34	35	
4	CSS Târgovişte	18	10	1	7	61	39	+22	31	
5	CS Metalul Vlăhiţa	18	7	3	8	57	49	+8	24	
6	Fair Play București	18	8	0	10	49	50	−1	24	
7	FC Alice&Tunes Piteşti	18	6	4	8	39	37	+2	22	
8	CS Navobi Iaşi	18	4	4	10	21	64	−43	16	
9	SN Constanţa	18	3	1	14	23	109	−86	10	
10	Viitorul 2010 Buzău	18	1	1	16	6	145	−139	4	

==== West ====
Pos	Team	Pld	W	D	L	GF	GA	GD	Pts	Qualification
1	Olimpia Cluj	18	18	0	0	180	3	+177	54	Final stage
2	CS Real Craiova	18	16	0	2	129	26	+103	42 (Note: On 12 October 2011 CS Real Craicova was docked 6 points by the Disciplinary Committee of the FRF.)	Final stage
3	CFR 1933 Timișoara	18	10	2	6	92	43	+49	32	
4	Motorul Oradea	18	10	2	6	51	43	+8	32	
5	CS Independenţa Baia Mare	18	9	1	8	55	55	0	28	
6	FC UTA Arad	18	7	1	10	64	77	−13	22	
7	CS Negrea Reşiţa	18	6	0	12	30	107	−77	18	
8	CFF Clujana	18	5	0	13	25	54	−29	15	
9	Sporting Craiova	18	4	0	14	26	126	−100	12	
10	FCM Viitorul Reghin	18	2	0	16	8	126	−118	6	

=== Championship play-off ===
The top two of each group advance to the final stage. The six teams play each other two times for a total of six games. The group winners Olimpia and Targu Mures started with three bonus points.

Pos	Team	Pld	W	D	L	GF	GA	GD	Pts	Qualification
1	CFF Olimpia Cluj (C)	6	5	0	1	36	5	+31	18	2012–13 UEFA Champions League Round of 32
2	FC Municipal Targu Mures	6	4	0	2	18	11	+7	15	
3	CS Real Craiova	6	2	0	4	14	20	−6	6	
4	CS Brazi	6	1	0	5	7	39	−32	3	

Source: Liga I play-offs
(C) Champions

Home \ Away	OLI	TMU	CRA	BRA
CFF Olimpia Cluj		3–0	5–0	16–0
FC Municipal Targu Mures	1–5		3–0	5–0
CS Real Craiova	1–7			9–2
CS Brazi	3–0 (Note: Match awarded. Original score was 4–1 in favor of Olimpia, who filed an ineligible player.)	2–6	0–3	

Legend: Blue = home team win; Yellow = draw; Red = away team win.

== Top scorer ==
Cosmina Dusa won the top-scorer award for a second season in a row with 71 goals.
