= 2018–19 Liga I (women's football) =

Liga I
- Season: 2018–19
- Country: Romania
- Teams: 10
- Champions: Olimpia Cluj (9th title)
- Relegated: Târgoviște
- Women's UCL: Olimpia Cluj
- Matches: 90
- Goals: 444 (4.93 per match)
- Biggest home win: Olimpia 9–1 Fair Play; Vasas 9–1 Fair Play; Baia Mare 9–1 Târgov.
- Biggest away win: Fair Play 2–11 Galați
- Highest scoring: Fair Play 2–11 Galați
- Longest winning run: 10 matches: Olimpia Cluj
- Longest unbeaten run: 10 matches: Olimpia Cluj
- Longest winless run: 12 matches: Târgoviște
- Longest losing run: 12 matches: Târgoviște
- All statistics correct as of 9 June 2019.

The 2018–19 Liga I is the 29th season of the top level women's football league of the Romanian football league system. It will decide the Romanian champions and UEFA Women's Champions League participant.

Olimpia Cluj are the defending champions.

== Team changes ==
=== To Liga I ===
Promoted from Liga II

- Universitatea Galați
- Independența Baia Mare

=== From Liga I ===
Relegated to Liga II

- Târgu Mureș
- Real Craiova

== Stadiums by capacity ==
Club	City	Stadium	Capacity
CFR	Timișoara	CFR	7,000
Fair Play	Bucharest	Ciorogârla	1,000
Fortuna	Becicherecu Mic	Comunal	500
Heniu	Prundu Bârgăului	Heniu	500
Independența	Baia Mare	Central (Săsar)	600
Olimpia	Cluj-Napoca	Victoria Someșeni	1,300
Târgoviște	Târgoviște	Alpan (Șotânga)	1,000
Universitatea	Alexandria	Municipal	5,000
Universitatea	Galați	Siderurgistul	6,000
Vasas Femina	Odorheiu Secuiesc	Municipal	5,000

== Stadiums by locations ==
Location of teams in 2018–19 Liga I

== Regular season ==
In the regular season the 10 teams will meet twice, a total of 18 matches per team, with the top 3 advancing to the Championship round and the bottom 7 qualifying for Relegation round.

=== Table ===
Pos	Team	Pld	W	D	L	GF	GA	GD	Pts	Qualification
1	Olimpia Cluj	16	15	0	1	78	6	+72	45	Qualification for the Championship round
2	Fortuna Becicherecu Mic	16	9	3	4	35	21	+14	30	Qualification for the Championship round
3	Heniu Prundu Bârgăului	16	9	2	5	29	21	+8	29	Qualification for the Championship round
4	Vasas Femina	16	8	4	4	51	26	+25	28	Qualification for the Lower table round
5	Universitatea Galați	16	7	1	8	43	31	+12	22	Qualification for the Lower table round
6	Universitatea Alexandria	16	6	3	7	34	34	0	21	Qualification for the Lower table round
7	Independența Baia Mare	16	6	2	8	43	47	−4	20	Qualification for the Relegation round
8	Fair Play București	16	3	1	12	20	84	−64	10	Qualification for the Relegation round
9	Târgoviște	16	1	0	15	14	77	−63	3	Qualification for the Relegation round
10	CFR Timișoara (E)	0	0	0	0	0	0	0	0 (Note: CFR Timișoara withdrew from the championship after two rounds and all their results were canceled.)	Withdrew

Source: FRF (in Romanian), Soccerway
Rules for classification: 1) Points; 2) Head-to-head points; 3) Head-to-head goal difference; 4) Head-to-head goals scored; 5) Head-to-head away goals scored 6) Goal difference; 7) Goals scored.
(E) Eliminated

=== Results ===
Home \ Away	CFR	FPB	FOR	HEN	IND	OLI	TGV	UAL	UGL	VAS
CFR Timișoara										
Fair Play București			2–6	2–1	4–4	0–9	2–8	0–5	2–11	4–3
Fortuna Becicherecu Mic		4–0		0–0	2–2	0–5	5–0	4–0	2–1	1–1
Heniu Prundu Bârgăului		4–0	1–0		4–0	0–3	4–0	0–2	3–1	1–1
Independența Baia Mare		3–0	5–4	1–2		0–7	3–1	7–1	5–0	1–2
Olimpia Cluj		9–1	0–1	5–0	6–0		7–0	6–0	3–1	4–0
Târgoviște		0–2	0–3	1–5	1–5	1–7		1–6	1–3	0–7
Universitatea Alexandria		4–0	0–1	1–2	2–1	0–2	7–0		3–0	3–3
Universitatea Galați		4–0	0–1	1–2	6–5	0–2	4–0	4–0		4–0
Vasas Femina		9–1	4–1	3–0	5–1	2–3	7–0	1–1	3–1	

Updated to match(es) played on 8 May 2019. Source: Liga I Feminin
Legend: Blue = home team win; Yellow = draw; Red = away team win.

=== Positions by round ===
Team ╲ Round	1	2	3	4	5	6	7	8	9	10	11	12	13	14	15	16	17	18
CFR Timișoara	10	10	10	10	10	10	10	10	10	10	10	10	10	10	10	10	10	10
Fair Play București	7	8	8	8	7	7	7	8	8	8	8	8	8	8	8	8	8	8
Fortuna Becicherecu Mic	9	4	6	4	6	5	5	5	4	3	2	3	2	2	2	2	3	2
Heniu Prundu Bârgăului	4	5	3	5	3	3	2	3	5	4	4	5	5	5	3	3	4	3
Independența Baia Mare	6	7	7	6	4	4	6	7	7	7	7	7	7	7	6	6	6	7
Olimpia Cluj	1	1	1	1	1	1	1	1	1	1	1	1	1	1	1	1	1	1
Târgoviște	8	9	9	9	9	9	9	9	9	9	9	9	9	9	9	9	9	9
Universitatea Alexandria	2	2	2	2	2	2	3	2	2	2	3	2	3	4	5	5	5	6
Universitatea Galați	3	3	5	7	8	8	8	6	6	6	6	6	6	6	7	7	7	5
Vasas Femina	5	6	4	3	5	6	4	4	3	5	5	4	4	3	4	4	2	4

== Championship round ==
The top three teams from Regular season will meet twice (4 matches per team) for a place in 2019–20 UEFA Women's Champions League as well as deciding the league champion. Teams start the Championship round with their points from the Regular season halved, rounded upwards, and no other records carried over from the Regular season.

=== Table ===
Pos	Team	Pld	W	D	L	GF	GA	GD	Pts	Qualification
1	Olimpia Cluj (C, Q)	4	4	0	0	19	0	+19	35	Qualification to Champions League qualifying round
2	Fortuna Becicherecu Mic	4	1	0	3	6	12	−6	18	
3	Heniu Prundu Bârgăului	4	1	0	3	3	16	−13	18	

Updated to match(es) played on 9 June 2019. Source: Soccerway, Romanian Football Federation
Rules for classification: 1) Points; 2) Points without rounding; 3) Head-to-head points; 4) Head-to-head goal difference; 5) Head-to-head goals scored; 6) Goal difference; 7) Goals scored; 8) Play-off (only if needed to decide champion or teams for UEFA competitions). (Note: only criteria 6 and 7 are applied to establish the classification during the competition.)
(C) Champions; (Q) Qualified for the phase indicated

=== Results ===
Home \ Away	FOR	HEN	OLI
Fortuna Becicherecu Mic		4–0	0–2
Heniu Prundu Bârgăului	3–2		0–4
Olimpia Cluj	7–0	6–0	

Updated to match(es) played on 9 June 2019. Source: Play-Off Liga 1 Feminin
Legend: Blue = home team win; Yellow = draw; Red = away team win.

=== Positions by round ===
Team ╲ Round	1	2	3	4	5	6
Fortuna Becicherecu Mic	2	2	2	2	2	2
Heniu Prundu Bârgăului	3	3	3	3	3	3
Olimpia Cluj	1	1	1	1	1	1

== Lower table round ==
The teams ranked from 4th to 6th in the Regular season will meet twice (4 matches per team) for deciding the final league rankings. Teams start the Lower table round with their points from the Regular season halved, rounded upwards, and no other records carried over from the Regular season.

=== Table ===
Pos	Team	Pld	W	D	L	GF	GA	GD	Pts
4	Universitatea Galați	4	2	1	1	13	6	+7	18
5	Universitatea Alexandria	4	2	1	1	9	8	+1	18
6	Vasas Femina	4	0	2	2	4	12	−8	16

Updated to match(es) played on 9 June 2019. Source: Soccerway, Romanian Football Federation
Rules for classification: 1) Points; 2) Points without rounding; 3) Head-to-head points; 4) Head-to-head goal difference; 5) Head-to-head goals scored; 6) Goal difference; 7) Goals scored; 8) Play-off (only if needed to decide champion or teams for UEFA competitions). (Note: only criteria 6 and 7 are applied to establish the classification during the competition.)

=== Results ===
Home \ Away	UAL	UGL	VAS
Universitatea Alexandria		4–1	1–1
Universitatea Galați	4–1		7–0
Vasas Femina	2–3	1–1	

Updated to match(es) played on 9 June 2019. Source: Jocuri de clasament Liga 1 Feminin
Legend: Blue = home team win; Yellow = draw; Red = away team win.

=== Positions by round ===
Team ╲ Round	1	2	3	4	5	6
Universitatea Alexandria	6	6	6	5	6	5
Universitatea Galați	4	4	5	6	4	4
Vasas Femina	5	5	4	4	5	6

== Relegation round ==
The bottom three teams from Regular season (without 10 place, which was excluded) will meet twice (4 matches per team) to contest against relegation. Teams start the Relegation round with their points from the Regular season halved, rounded upwards, and no other records carried over from the Regular season.

=== Table ===
Pos	Team	Pld	W	D	L	GF	GA	GD	Pts	Qualification
7	Independența Baia Mare	4	3	0	1	21	9	+12	19	
8	Fair Play București	4	2	0	2	12	14	−2	11	
9	Târgoviște (R)	4	1	0	3	10	20	−10	5	Relegation to Liga II

Updated to match(es) played on 9 June 2019. Source: Soccerway, Romanian Football Federation
Rules for classification: 1) Points; 2) Points without rounding; 3) Head-to-head points; 4) Head-to-head goal difference; 5) Head-to-head goals scored; 6) Goal difference; 7) Goals scored; 8) Play-off (only if needed to decide champion or teams for UEFA competitions). (Note: only criteria 6 and 7 are applied to establish the classification during the competition.)
(R) Relegated

=== Results ===
Home \ Away	FPB	IND	TGV
Fair Play București		3–4	5–3
Independența Baia Mare	5–1		9–1
Târgoviște	2–3	4–3	

Updated to match(es) played on 9 June 2019. Source: Jocuri de clasament Liga 1 Feminin
Legend: Blue = home team win; Yellow = draw; Red = away team win.

=== Positions by round ===
Team ╲ Round	1	2	3	4	5	6
Fair Play București	8	8	8	8	8	8
Independența Baia Mare	7	7	7	7	7	7
Târgoviște	9	9	9	9	9	9
