= 2014–15 Romanian Superliga (women's football) =

Superliga
- Season: 2014–15
- Champions: Olimpia Cluj
- Relegated: Universitatea; CS Brazi; CFR
- Women's UCL: Olimpia Cluj
- Top goalscorer: Alexandra Lunca (32)

The 2014–15 season of Romania's top level women's football league was the second under the new name Superliga. The old name Liga I is now used for the new second-level league. It is the 25th season of top-level football and will decide the Romanian champions and UEFA Women's Champions League participant.

Olimpia Cluj were the defending champions and defended their title with a fifth championship title in a row.

== Changes from 2013 to 2014 ==
- The league is again divided into a first stage and then a championship and relegation round.
- For the first time club's face relegation, as the bottom two placed clubs are relegated into next season's Liga I.

== Standings ==
=== Regular season ===
Pos	Team	Pld	W	D	L	GF	GA	GD	Pts	Qualification
1	Olimpia Cluj	14	12	1	1	127	4	+123	37	Championship group
2	ASA 2013 Târgu Mureș	14	12	1	1	82	9	+73	37	Championship group
3	Heniu Prundu Bârgăului	14	9	1	4	34	24	+10	28	Championship group
4	Real Craiova	14	6	3	5	29	38	−9	21	Championship group
5	Universitatea Alexandria	14	5	2	7	26	61	−35	17	Relegation group
6	Brazi	14	3	0	11	15	68	−53	9	Relegation group
7	Fair Play București	14	2	0	12	13	97	−84	6	Relegation group
8	CFR Timișoara (Note: CFR Timişoara were deducted 30 points.)	14	3	0	11	18	43	−25	−21	Relegation group

Source: FRF (in Romanian)
Rules for classification: 1st points; 2nd head-to-head points; 3rd head-to-head goal difference; 4th head-to-head goals scored; 5th head-to-head away goals scored; 6th goal difference; 7th number of goals scored

=== Championship Group ===
Pos	Team	Pld	W	D	L	GF	GA	GD	Pts	Qualification
1	Olimpia Cluj (C, Q)	6	6	0	0	33	1	+32	37	Qualification to Women's Champions League
2	ASA 2013 Târgu Mureș	6	3	1	2	18	8	+10	29	
3	Heniu Prundu Bârgăului	6	1	2	3	5	14	−9	19	
4	Real Craiova	6	0	1	5	3	36	−33	12	

Source: FRF (in Romanian)
Rules for classification: 1st points; 2nd head-to-head points; 3rd head-to-head goal difference; 4th head-to-head goals scored; 5th head-to-head away goals scored; 6th goal difference; 7th number of goals scored
(C) Champions; (Q) Qualified for the phase indicated

=== Relegation Group ===
Played by the teams placed fifth to eighth of the first stage. Teams play each other twice.

Pos	Team	Pld	W	D	L	GF	GA	GD	Pts	Relegation
1	Fair Play București	4	3	1	0	13	2	+11	13	
2	Brazi (R)	4	1	1	2	5	9	−4	9	Relegation to Liga I
3	Universitatea Alexandria (R)	4	1	0	3	4	11	−7	0	Relegation to Liga I
4	CFR Timișoara (Note: CFR Timişoara withdrew from the championship) (R)	0	0	0	0	0	0	0	0	Relegation to Liga I

Source: FRF (in Romanian)
Rules for classification: 1st points; 2nd head-to-head points; 3rd head-to-head goal difference; 4th head-to-head goals scored; 5th head-to-head away goals scored; 6th goal difference; 7th number of goals scored
(R) Relegated
