= 2019–20 Liga I (women's football) =

Liga I
- Season: 2019–20
- Country: Romania
- Teams: 12
- Champions: U Olimpia Cluj
- Relegated: no teams
- Matches: 66
- Goals: 315 (4.77 per match)
- Biggest home win: U Olimpia 12–0 Fair Play
- Biggest away win: Piroș Security 0–8 U Galați
- Highest scoring: U Olimpia 12–0 Fair Play
- All statistics correct as of 1 December 2019.

The 2019–20 Liga I was the 30th season of the top level women's football league of the Romanian football league system. Since the previous season, the league was expanded from 10 to 12 teams, and the play-offs were removed. As such, the 12 teams were to compete in a double round-robin of 22 stages, for a total of 132 matches. However, due to the 2019-20 coronavirus pandemic, only the first half of the championship was played, for a total of 66 matches. On 11 May 2020 it was announced that the lower half of the championship is to be frozen, with no relegation, and that a discussion was being held together with the representatives of the top six teams on how to proceed with the upper half. Subsequently, on 21 May 2020, it was publicly announced that no more games will be played, and the final standings were those established on 1 December 2019, after the first 11 rounds. As such, all of the games in this edition of Liga I were played in the 2019 calendar year, while those scheduled in 2020 were all cancelled.

U Olimpia Cluj were the defending champions and also the champions of the current edition, in addition to qualifying in the next edition of the Women's Champions League.

== Team changes ==
=== To Liga I ===
Promoted from Liga II

- Selena SN Constanța (winner of 2018-19 Liga II, Seria I)
- Piroș Security Lioness Arad (runners-up of 2018-19 Liga II, Seria II)
- Luceafărul Filiași (winner of 2018-19 Liga II Promotion Qualifier)

=== From Liga I ===
Disbanded

- CFR Timișoara (withdrawn during 2018-19 Liga I)

== Stadiums by capacity and location ==
Location of teams in 2019–20 Liga I

Club	City	Stadium	Capacity
Fair Play	Bucharest	Ciorogârla	1,000
Fortuna	Becicherecu Mic	Comunal	500
Heniu	Prundu Bârgăului	Heniu	500
Independența	Baia Mare	Central (Săsar)	600
Luceafărul	Filiași	CFR (Craiova)	3,000
U Olimpia	Cluj-Napoca	Victoria Someșeni	1,300
Piroș Security Lioness	Arad	Sânnicolaul Mic	1,500
Târgoviște	Târgoviște	Alpan (Șotânga)	1,000
Universitatea	Alexandria	Municipal	5,000
Universitatea	Galați	Siderurgistul	6,000
Selena ȘN	Constanța	SNC	
Vasas Femina	Odorheiu Secuiesc	Municipal	5,000

== League table ==
Pos	Team	Pld	W	D	L	GF	GA	GD	Pts	Qualification
1	U Olimpia Cluj	11	10	1	0	61	8	+53	31	Qualification to Women's Champions League
2	Universitatea Galați	11	8	2	1	33	10	+23	26	
3	Fortuna Becicherecu Mic	11	8	1	2	47	7	+40	25	
4	Vasas Femina Odorhei	11	7	2	2	41	9	+32	23	
5	Piroș Security Arad	11	7	0	4	28	24	+4	21	
6	Heniu Prundu Bârgăului	11	4	2	5	23	19	+4	14	
7	CSȘ Târgoviște	11	4	0	7	19	42	−23	12	
8	Independența Baia Mare	11	3	1	7	18	26	−8	10	
9	Universitatea Alexandria	11	3	1	7	13	30	−17	10	
10	Luceafărul Filiași	11	3	0	8	11	47	−36	9	
11	Fair Play București	11	2	0	9	11	54	−43	6	Spared from relegation to Liga II
12	Selena ȘN Constanța	11	1	2	8	10	39	−29	5	Spared from relegation to Liga II

Updated to match(es) played on 1 December 2019. Source: FRF (in Romanian), Soccerway
Rules for classification: 1) Points; 2) Head-to-head points; 3) Head-to-head goal difference; 4) Head-to-head goals scored; 5) Head-to-head away goals scored 6) Goal difference; 7) Goals scored.

=== Results ===
Home \ Away	OLI	FOR	HEN	UGL	UAL	VAS	IND	FPB	TGV	SEL	PIR	LUC
Olimpia Cluj		canc.	3–0	canc.	canc.	canc.	6–1	12–0	4–0	9–0	canc.	canc.
Fortuna Becicherecu Mic	0–3		canc.	0–1	6–0	canc.	canc.	canc.	canc.	7–0	2–0	10–0
Heniu Prundu Bârgăului	canc.	0–3		2–2	canc.	0–2	2–0	8–1	4–1	canc.	canc.	canc.
Universitatea Galați	1–1	canc.	canc.		4–0	1–3	1–0	canc.	7–3	canc.	canc.	canc.
Universitatea Alexandria	1–6	canc.	2–0	canc.		canc.	canc.	5–0	1–2	2–2	canc.	canc.
Vasas Femina Odorhei	2–3	1–1	canc.	canc.	7–0		canc.	canc.	canc.	canc.	3–1	10–0
Independența Baia Mare	canc.	1–4	canc.	canc.	0–2	0–0		canc.	canc.	canc.	2–5	3–1
Fair Play București	canc.	1–7	canc.	0–4	canc.	1–6	2–5		4–3	canc.	1–2	canc.
CSȘ Târgoviște	canc.	0–7	canc.	canc.	canc.	0–6	2–1	canc.		canc.	1–3	4–3
Selena ȘN Constanța	canc.	canc.	2–2	1–2	canc.	2–1	1–5	0–1	2–3		canc.	canc.
Piroș Security Arad	3–6	canc.	2–1	0–8	1–0	canc.	canc.	canc.	canc.	5–0		6–0
Luceafărul Filiași	0–1	canc.	1–4	0–2	2–0	canc.	canc.	2–0	canc.	2–0	canc.	

Updated to match(es) played on 1 December 2019.. Source: Liga I Feminin
Legend: Blue = home team win; Yellow = draw; Red = away team win.
