= ACS Heniu Prundu Bârgăului (women) =

Romanian football club

Heniu Prundu Bârgăului
- Full name: Asociația Club Sportiv Heniu Prundu Bârgăului
- Nicknames: Bârgăuancele (The Women from Prundu Bârgăului)
- Short name: Heniu
- Founded: 4 September 2013; 13 years ago
- Dissolved: 2022
- Ground: Heniu
- Capacity: 5,000
- Chairman: Gheorghe Ruscău Sr.
Home colours	Away colours

ACS Heniu Prundu Bârgăului, commonly known as Heniu Prundu Bârgăului, or simply Heniu, was a Romanian women's football club based in Prundu Bârgăului, Bistrița-Năsăud County, Romania. The team was founded in 2013 as the women's squad of Heniu Prundu Bârgăului, a club founded in 1938 that includes also a male football team.

Bârgăuancele continuously played in the Liga I, first tier of the Romanian women's football system, after promoting at the end of the 2013–14 season.

In the summer of 2022, the team was supposed to be taken over by the CS Gloria 2018 Bistrița-Năsăud club, which had more financial support. The move fell short due to identity issues, the main reason being the Heniu brand would have been suppressed in favor of the Gloria one. Heniu coach Călin Svoboda, along with a large part of the players opted to move to found the women's football section of Gloria 2018, while Heniu disbanded due to a combination of lack of players and financial support.

== Honours ==
=== Leagues ===
- Liga I
  - Runners-up (2): 2020–21, 2021–22
- Liga II
  - Winners (1): 2013–14

=== Cups ===
- Romanian Women's Cup
  - Runners-up (3): 2017–18, 2020–21, 2021–22

== Season by season ==
Champions Runners-up Third place Promoted Relegated

Season		Division	Tier	Place	Cup	WCL
1	2013–14	Liga I, Seria Nord	2	1st	1R	–
2	2014–15	Superliga	1	3rd	QF	–
3	2015–16	Superliga	1	8th	R16	–
4	2016–17	Superliga	1	5th	SF	–
5	2017–18	Liga I	1	7th	F	–
6	2018–19	Liga I	1	3rd	QF	–
7	2019–20	Liga I	1	6th	QF	–
8	2020–21	Liga I	1	2nd	F	–
9	2021–22	Liga I	1	2nd	F	–
