= 2013–14 Romanian Superliga (women's football) =

Superliga
- Season: 2013–14
- Champions: Olimpia Cluj
- Relegated: Navobi Iași; Independența
- UEFA Women's Champions League: Olimpia Cluj
- Top goalscorer: Alexandra Lunca (31)

The 2013–14 season of Romania's top level women's football league was the first under the new name Superliga. The old name Liga I is now being used for the new second-level league. It is the 24th season of top-level football and will decide the Romanian champions and UEFA Women's Champions League participant.

Olimpia Cluj were the defending champions and defended their title with a fourth championship title in a row.

Alexandra Lunca won the top scorer award with 31 goals.

== Changes from 2012 to 2013 ==
- Eight instead of 18 teams play in the league. All teams play in a single division.
- The league is again divided into a first stage and then a championship and relegation round.
- For the first time club's face relegation, as the bottom two placed clubs are relegated into next season's Liga I.

== Standings ==
=== Regular season ===
Each team plays 14 games.

Pos	Team	Pld	W	D	L	GF	GA	GD	Pts	Qualification
1	Olimpia Cluj	14	14	0	0	112	6	+106	42	Championship group
2	REAL Craiova	14	11	0	3	42	17	+25	33	Championship group
3	CFR Timișoara	14	9	0	5	39	21	+18	27	Championship group
4	Târgu Mureş	14	8	1	5	45	19	+26	25	Championship group
5	Fairplay București	14	5	0	9	29	69	−40	15	Relegation group
6	Brazi	14	4	2	8	23	34	−11	14	Relegation group
7	Navobi Iaşi	14	2	1	11	10	66	−56	7	Relegation group
8	Independenţa Baia Mare	14	0	2	12	5	73	−68	2	Relegation group

Rules for classification: 1st points; 2nd head-to-head points; 3rd head-to-head goal difference; 4th head-to-head goals scored; 5th head-to-head away goals scored; 6th goal difference; 7th number of goals scored

=== Championship Group ===
Played by the top four teams of the first round. Teams play each other twice. Bonus points awarded for the regular season finish: Cluj 3, Craiova 2, Timișoara 1 and Targu Mures 0.

Pos	Team	Pld	W	D	L	GF	GA	GD	Pts	Qualification	CLU	TAR	CRA	TIM
1	Olimpia Cluj (C, Q)	6	6	0	0	34	4	+30	21	Qualification to Women's Champions League		4–3	13–1	6–0
2	Târgu Mureş	6	4	0	2	19	8	+11	12		0–2		3–0	4–1
3	REAL Craiova	6	1	0	5	3	31	−28	5		0–5	0–5		1–0
4	CFR Timișoara	6	1	0	5	7	20	−13	4		0–4	1–3	5–1	

Legend: Blue = home team win; Yellow = draw; Red = away team win.
Rules for classification: 1st points; 2nd head-to-head points; 3rd head-to-head goal difference; 4th head-to-head goals scored; 5th head-to-head away goals scored; 6th goal difference; 7th number of goals scored
(C) Champions; (Q) Qualified for the phase indicated

=== Relegation Group ===
Played by the teams placed fifth to eighth of the first stage. Teams play each other twice. Bonus points awarded for regular season finish: Fair Play 3, Brazi 2, Iasi 1, Independenţa Baia Mare 0.

Pos	Team	Pld	W	D	L	GF	GA	GD	Pts	Relegation
1	Brazi	6	5	0	1	20	5	+15	17	
2	Fair Play București	6	4	0	2	15	10	+5	15	
3	Navobi Iaşi (R)	6	3	0	3	12	19	−7	10	Relegation to Liga I
4	Independenţa Baia Mare (R)	6	0	0	6	6	19	−13	0	Relegation to Liga I

Rules for classification: 1st points; 2nd head-to-head points; 3rd head-to-head goal difference; 4th head-to-head goals scored; 5th head-to-head away goals scored; 6th goal difference; 7th number of goals scored
(R) Relegated
