= CSM Alexandria (women's football) =

Romanian football club

- Full name: Club Sportiv Municipal Alexandria
- Short name: CSM Alexandria
- Founded: 2012; 13 years ago
- Ground: Municipal
- Capacity: 5,000
- Owner: Alexandria Municipality
- Chairman: Adrian Cioacă
- Manager: Călin Pistolea
- League: Liga II
- 2023–24: Liga I, 6th (relegated)
Home colours	Away colours

Clubul Sportiv Universitatea Alexandria, commonly known as Universitatea Alexandria, or simply U Alexandria, is a Romanian women's football club based in Alexandria, Teleorman County, Romania. The team was founded in 2012, since then playing constantly in the Romanian leagues.

Universitatea Alexandria currently plays in the Liga I, first tier of the Romanian women's football system, after ranking 4th at the end of the 2017–18 season.

== Chronology of names ==
Period	Full Club Name	Short name
2012–2021	Club Sportiv Universitatea Alexandria	U Alexandria
2021–present	Club Sportiv Municipal Alexandria	CSM Alexandria

Original crest of U Alexandria used between 2012 and 2021

== Honours ==
=== Leagues ===
- Liga II
  - Winners (2): 2013–14, 2016–17

== Season by season ==
Champions Runners-up Third place Promoted Relegated

Season		Division	Tier	Place	Cup	WCL
1	2012–13	Liga I, Seria Sud	1	14th	QF	–
2	2013–14	Liga I, Seria Sud	2	1st	R16	–
3	2014–15	Superliga	1	7th	QF	–
4	2015–16	Liga I, Seria I	2	8th	2R	–
5	2016–17	Liga I, Seria I	2	1st	QF	–
6	2017–18	Liga I	1	4th	R16	–
7	2018–19	Liga I	1	5th	R16	–
8	2018–19	Liga I	1	9th	QF	–
9	2020–21	Liga I	1	7th	QF	–
10	2021–22	Liga I	1	4th	QF	–

== Current squad ==
As of 19 January 2019

Note: Flags indicate national team as defined under FIFA eligibility rules; some limited exceptions apply. Players may hold more than one non-FIFA nationality.

No.	Pos.	Nation	Player
—	GK	(Romania) ROU	Andreea Pencea
—	DF	(Romania) ROU	Oana Dumitrache
—	DF	(Romania) ROU	Otillia Durlă
—	DF	(Romania) ROU	Georgiana Gologan
—	DF	(Romania) ROU	Iulia Iorgoni
—	DF	(Romania) ROU	Patricia Jderu
—	MF	(Romania) ROU	Florina Chiar
—	MF	(Romania) ROU	Andreea Diță

No.	Pos.	Nation	Player}
—	MF	(Romania) ROU	Ștefania Ivan
—	MF	(Romania) ROU	Genoveva Roșie
—	MF	(Romania) ROU	Christina Sandu
—	MF	(Romania) ROU	Christina Tudorache
—	FW	(Romania) ROU	Andra Olaru
—	FW	(Romania) ROU	Cătălina Panait
—	FW	(Romania) ROU	Iulia Săvescu (Captain)
—	FW	(Romania) ROU	Anamaria Vasile

== Club officials ==
=== Board of directors ===
Role	Name
President	(Romania) Adrian Cioacă

- Last updated: 19 January 2019

=== Current technical staff ===
Role	Name
Manager	(Romania) Călin Pistolea
Goalkeeping Coach	(Romania) Gabriel Lungu

- Last updated: 19 January 2019
