= FC CFR Timișoara (women) =

CFR 1933 Timișoara
- Full name: Fotbal Club CFR 1933 Timișoara
- Nickname(s): Leopardele (The Leopards)
- Short name: CFR Timișoara
- Founded: 2011
- Dissolved: 2018
- Ground: CFR
- Capacity: 7,000
Home colours	Away colours

Fotbal Club CFR 1933 Timișoara was the women's section of Romanian football club CFR Timișoara. It was created in 2011 and immediately joined the First Division. Part of its squad proceeded from its defunct predecessor FC Ripensia Timișoara, which won the 2009 Cupa României. In its debut season CFR was third in the league's West Division, an overall sixth position.

In September 2018 the club withdrew from Liga I and then was dissolved.

== Season by season ==
Champions Runners-up Third Place Promoted Relegated

Season		Division	Tier	Place	Cup	WCL
1	2011–12	Liga I, Seria Vest	1	6th	QF	–
2	2012–13	Liga I, Seria Vest	1	3rd	SF	–
3	2013–14	Superliga	1	4th	SF	–
4	2014–15	Superliga	1	8th	2R	–
5	2015–16	Liga I, Seria II	2	1st	QF	–
6	2016–17	Superliga	1	3rd	QF	–
7	2017–18	Liga I	1	3rd	QF	–
8	2018–19	Liga I	1	10th	–	–
