= 2012–13 Liga I (women's football) =

Liga I Feminin
- Season: 2012–13
- Champions: Olimpia Cluj
- Champions League: Olimpia Cluj

The 2012–13 season of the Liga I Feminin was the 23rd season of Romania's premier women's football league. Olimpia Cluj were the defending champions and defended their title.

The season was the last named Liga I and prepared the restructuring of the Romanian football pyramid. Next season a second-level league was created.

== Changes from 2011 to 2012 ==
- 18 teams play in the league, two less than last season.
- The league is now played in three divisions instead of two. After a double round robin, i.e. 18 matches per team, the top two teams will move on to play the championship round.
- Because of the creation of the new Superliga the third placed teams from each group will play a play-off with the top two qualifying for next season's Superliga.
- The fourth to sixth placed teams are divided into two groups that play a round-robin again. Though all clubs will start in next year's second-level league, the 2013–2014 Liga I.

== Standings ==
=== First stage ===
Each team plays 10 games.

==== East ====
Pos	Team	Pld	W	D	L	GF	GA	GD	Pts	Qualification
1	FCM Târgu Mureş	10	9	0	1	78	6	+72	27	Final stage
2	CS Blue Angel Cristian Brasov	10	9	0	1	33	9	+24	27	Final stage
3	CS Navobi Iasi	10	6	0	4	23	20	+3	18	Superliga qualifying
4	ACS Vasas Femina	10	4	0	6	20	35	−15	12	Play-out
5	Viitorul 2010 Buzau	18	7	3	8	10	39	−29	24	Play-out
6	FCM Viitorul Reghin	10	0	0	10	3	58	−55	0	Play-out

==== West ====
Pos	Team	Pld	W	D	L	GF	GA	GD	Pts	Qualification
1	Olimpia Cluj	10	9	0	1	94	2	+92	27	Final stage
2	CFR 1933 Timișoara	10	8	1	1	63	14	+49	25	Final stage
3	CS Independenta Baia Mare	10	5	1	4	22	33	−11	16	Superliga qualifying
4	FC UTA Arad	10	5	0	5	28	36	−8	15	Play-out
5	CS Navobi Alba Iulia	10	1	0	9	5	70	−65	3	Play-out
6	CS Negrea Reşiţa	10	1	0	9	2	59	−57	−21 (Note: CS Negrea Reşiţa were deducted 24 points by the Disciplinary Committee of the FRF. They also were excluded from playing the following round this season.)	

==== South ====
Pos	Team	Pld	W	D	L	GF	GA	GD	Pts	Qualification
1	CS Brazi	10	8	2	0	34	4	+30	26	Final stage
2	CS REAL Craiova	10	6	2	2	58	14	+44	20	Final stage
3	Fair Play București	10	6	2	2	25	17	+8	20	Superliga qualifying
4	CSS Târgovişte	10	4	2	4	24	15	+9	14	Play-out
5	Universitatea Alexandria	10	2	0	8	17	55	−38	6	Play-out
6	Sporting Craiova	10	0	0	10	3	56	−53	0	Play-out

=== Championship play-off ===
The top two of each group advanced to the final stage. The six teams play each other two times for a total of ten games. In contrast to last season, there were no bonus points given for winning their first stage division. Blue Angel Cristian Brasov withdrew their team after the season.

Pos	Team	Pld	W	D	L	GF	GA	GD	Pts	Qualification
1	Olimpia Cluj	10	10	0	0	59	4	+55	30	2013–14 UEFA Champions League Round of 32
2	FCM Târgu Mureş	10	7	1	2	46	13	+33	22	2013–14 Superliga
3	CFR 1933 Timișoara	10	4	1	5	17	31	−14	13	2013–14 Superliga
4	CS REAL Craiova	10	4	1	5	16	31	−15	13	2013–14 Superliga
5	CS Blue Angel Cristian Brasov (R)	10	2	2	6	11	29	−18	8	2013–14 Superliga
6	CS Brazi	91	0	1	90	10	51	−41	1	2013–14 Superliga

(R) Relegated

=== Superliga qualification ===
Played by the third placed teams from the first stage. Two were supposed to qualify, but after Blue Angel withdrew, all qualified.

Pos	Team	Pld	W	D	L	GF	GA	GD	Pts	Qualification
1	CS Navobi Iasi	4	2	1	1	4	5	−1	7	2013–14 Superliga
2	CS Independenta Baia Mare	4	1	2	1	6	5	+1	5	2013–14 Superliga
3	AFC FAIR PLAY București	4	1	1	2	7	7	0	4	2013–14 Superliga

=== Play-out ===
Played by teams placed fourth to sixth in the first stage. CS Negrea Reşiţa were disallowed to participate. All teams start in the Liga I next season.

==== Group A ====
Pos	Team	Pld	W	D	L	GF	GA	GD	Pts	Qualification
1	CSS Târgovişte	6	5	1	0	29	7	+22	16	2013–14 Liga I
2	Viitorul 2010 Buzau	6	3	1	2	16	11	+5	10	2013–14 Liga I
3	Universitatea Alexandria	6	3	0	3	22	20	+2	9	2013–14 Liga I
4	Sporting Craiova	6	0	0	6	5	34	−29	0	2013–14 Liga I

==== Group B ====
Pos	Team	Pld	W	D	L	GF	GA	GD	Pts	Qualification
1	Vasas Femina Odorhei	6	6	0	0	37	6	+31	18	2013–14 Liga I
2	FC UTA Arad	6	3	0	3	18	14	+4	9	2013–14 Liga I
3	FCM Viitorul Reghin	6	2	1	3	14	19	−5	7	2013–14 Liga I
4	Navobi Alba Iulia	6	0	1	5	6	36	−30	1	2013–14 Liga I
