= ACS Fortuna Becicherecu Mic (women) =

Romanian football club

Fortuna Becicherecu Mic
- Full name: Asociația Club Sportiv Fortuna Becicherecu Mic
- Nickname: Zeițele (The Goddesses)
- Short name: Fortuna
- Founded: 2015; 11 years ago as NMM Becicherecu Mic; 2016; 10 years ago as Fortuna Becicherecu Mic
- Ground: Comunal
- Capacity: 900 (700 seated)
- Owner: Becicherecu Mic Commune
- Chairman: Călin Pașca
- Managers: Andra Vela & Florin Pădurean
- League: Liga I
- 2019–20: Liga I, 3rd
- Website: fortunabecicherec.ro
Home colours	Away colours	Third colours

ACS Fortuna Becicherecu Mic, commonly known as Fortuna Becicherecu Mic, is a Romanian women's football club based in Becicherecu Mic, Timiș County, Romania. The team currently plays in the Liga I, first tier of the Romanian women's football system, after promoting at the end of the 2016–17 season.

== History ==
Fortuna Becicherecu Mic was founded in 2015 as a women's squad of CS Nuova Mama Mia Becicherecu Mic. However, after just one season of its inception, in the summer of 2016 when Nuova Mama Mia moved from Becicherecu Mic, a new entity (a club that includes also a male football team) was formed and took over the women's team including all of the players and staff, the equipment and the sports facilities under the name of ACS Fortuna Becicherecu Mic, thus insuring the continuity of the team under a new name. For this reason, the Romanian Football Federation allowed the team to keep its place in the second tier league, even though a third tier was created in 2016.

While still remaining a separate club, in the summer of 2020, ACS Fortuna Becicherecu Mic signed a partnership with ASU Politehnica Timișoara, as a result of which the male Fortuna team became an unofficial satellite of Politehnica's. In contrast, in the summer of 2021, strengthening the partnership between the two clubs, the Fortuna women's team announced that it will use the Politehnica Timișoara branding starting with the 2021–2022 season. As a result of the partnership, since summer 2021 it started using the Stadionul Știința (Baza 1) as its main stadium, but switched playing its games on Politehnica University of Timișoara's Baza 2 from 2022, while the Becicherecu Mic Communal is still used for training matches and some youth games.

=== Chronology of names ===
Period	Full Club Name	Short name
2015–2016	Club Sportiv Nuova Mama Mia Becicherecu Mic	Mama Mia Becicherecu Mic
2016–2021	Asociația Club Sportiv Fortuna Becicherecu Mic	Fortuna Becicherecu Mic
2021–present	Societatea Sportivă Universitară Politehnica Timișoara	Politehnica Femina

== Colors and kits ==
The colors of the team were red and white from 2015 until 2021, when due to the partnership with SSU Politehnica Timișoara, the team adopted its colors: white and violet.

2015–2016	2015–2016	2016–2021	2016–2021	2018–2021	2021–present	2021–present

== Honours ==
=== Leagues ===
- Liga I
  - Runners-up (1): 2018–19
- Liga II
  - Runners-up (1): 2016–17

=== Cups ===
- Romanian Women's Cup
  - Runners-up (1): 2018–19

== Season by season ==
Champions Runners-up Third place Promoted Relegated

Season		Division	Tier	Place	Cup	WCL
1	2015–16	Liga I, Seria II	2	5th	1R	–
2	2016–17	Liga I, Seria II	2	2nd	R16	–
3	2017–18	Liga I	1	8th	2R	–
4	2018–19	Liga I	1	2nd	F	–
5	2019–20	Liga I	1	3rd	R16	–
6	2020–21	Liga I	1	4th	R16	–
7	2021–22	Liga I	1	TBD	R32	–

== Current squad ==
As of 13 January 2019

Note: Flags indicate national team as defined under FIFA eligibility rules; some limited exceptions apply. Players may hold more than one non-FIFA nationality.

No.	Pos.	Nation	Player
—	GK	ROU	Mihaela Durlă
—	DF	ROU	Sabina Scurtu
—	DF	ROU	Claudia Bistrian
—	DF	ROU	Savetuca Codrescu (Captain)
—	DF	ROU	Camelia Crișan
—	DF	ROU	Denisa Heișu
—	DF	ROU	Oana Stoianov
—	DF	ROU	Lidia Șuveț
—	MF	ROU	Florina Abrudan
—	MF	ROU	Loredana Bondre
—	MF	ROU	Denisa Hațegan
—	MF	ROU	Larisa Grigore

No.	Pos.	Nation	Player
—	MF	ROU	Ioana Iancovici
—	MF	ROU	Bianca Ienovan
—	MF	ROU	Alexandra Lunca
—	MF	ROU	Monica Tomesc
—	MF	MDA	Nadejda Colesnicenco
—	FW	ROU	Mariana Voinea
—	FW	ROU	Cosmina Roșu
—	FW	ROU	Rebeca Pavel
—	FW	ROU	Loredana Sas
—	FW	ROU	Larisa Sîrbovan
—	FW	ROU	Cristina Sucilă

== Club officials ==
=== Board of directors ===
Role	Name
President	(Romania) Călin Pașca

- Last updated: 19 January 2019

=== Current technical staff ===
Role	Name
Managers	(Romania) Florin Pădurean (Romania) Andra Vela
Goalkeeping Coach	(Romania) Dorin Hraniesavlievici

- Last updated: 19 January 2019
