= ACS Fotbal Feminin Baia Mare =

Fotbal Feminin Baia Mare
- Full name: Asociația Clubul Sportiv Fotbal Feminin Baia Mare
- Nicknames: Domnițele râului (The Ladies of the river); Băimărencele (The Women from Baia Mare)
- Short name: Baia Mare
- Founded: 2009; 17 years ago
- Ground: Viorel Mateianu Stadium
- Capacity: 7.000
- Chairman: Cristian-Vasile Săsăran
- Manager: Daniel Lupuți
- League: Liga II
- 2022–23: Liga I, 10th (withdrew)
Home colours	Away colours	Third colours

Asociația Clubul Sportiv Fotbal Feminin Baia Mare is a Romanian women's football club based in Baia Mare, Maramureș County, Romania.

The Ladies of the river are currently playing in the Liga II, of the Romanian women's football system.

== History ==
Originally founded in 2009 as a female section of Asociația Sportivă Independența Baia Mare, a club founded itself in 2000, it was commonly known as Independența Baia Mare, or simply Independența until 2020. The team first affiliated to Romanian Football Federation only on 8 August 2011, since then playing constantly in the Romanian leagues. At the conclusion of the 2019–20 season which saw the disbandment of fellow Maramureș County club ACS Venus Maramureș, all the women's football actors in the county decided to join forces, and on 15 July 2020 the Independența team was renamed and rebranded to reflect this change. The change was approved in the Romanian Football Federation's Executive Committee of 3 August 2020.

In its history it relegated twice by finishing at the bottom of the top league Superliga after the 2013–14 and 2016–17 seasons, but in both instances it gained the promotion the very next season. Its best result in the top league was 6th place in the 2015–16 Superliga, while in the Romanian Cup, it reached the quarterfinals twice, in 2016–17 and 2018–19.

=== Chronology of names ===
Period	Full Club Name	Short name
2009–2020	Asociația Sportivă Independența Baia Mare	Independența Baia Mare
2020–present	Asociația Clubul Sportiv de Fotbal Feminin Baia Mare	Fotbal Feminin Baia Mare

== Kits and crest ==
Original crest of AS Independența Baia Mare used between 2009 and 2020

The team originally used the crest of the club Independența Baia Mare. Between 2009 and 2020 the club colours were green and yellow. Since the Fotbal Feminin era, the team colors are burgundy and yellow.

Main kit used in the Independența era (2009–2020).	Secondary kit used in the Independența era (2009–2020).	Alternate kit used in the Independența era (2009–2020).

== Grounds ==
Independența Baia Mare played for many years its official matches on Viorel Mateianu Stadium in Baia Mare, with a capacity of 7,000 seats. In 2018 Independența moved on newly renovated Central Stadium in Recea, with a capacity of only 600 seats. In 2020, Independența removed its home matches on Viorel Mateianu Stadium in Baia Mare.

== Honours ==
=== Leagues ===
- Liga II
  - Winners (1): 2017–18

== Season by season ==
Champions Runners-up Third place Promoted Relegated

Season		Division	Tier	Place	Cup	WCL
1	2011–12	Liga I, Seria Vest	1	9th	1R	–
2	2012–13	Liga I, Seria Vest	1	8th	R16	–
3	2013–14	Superliga	1	8th	2R	–
4	2014–15	Liga I, Seria I	2	3rd	2R	–
5	2015–16	Superliga	1	6th	R16	–
6	2016–17	Superliga	1	10th	QF	–
7	2017–18	Liga II, Seria II	2	1st	R16	–
8	2018–19	Liga I	1	7th	QF	–
9	2019–20	Liga I	1	8th	R16	–
10	2020–21	Liga I	1	9th	R16	–
11	2021–22	Liga I	1	8th	R16	–
12	2022–23	Liga I	1	10th	R16	–
13	2023–24	Liga II, Seria II	2	5th	2R	–
14	2024–25	Liga II, Seria II	2	8th	5R	–
15	2025–26	Liga II, Seria II	2	8th	2R	–
16	2026–27	Liga II, Seria II	2	-th	-	–

== Current squad ==
As of 2025

Note: Flags indicate national team as defined under FIFA eligibility rules; some limited exceptions apply. Players may hold more than one non-FIFA nationality.

No.	Pos.	Nation	Player
12	GK	ROU	Sara Gherghelas
2	DF	ROU	Daria Asăujan
15	DF	ROU	Anamaria Samok
7	DF	ROU	Diana Pop
6	DF	ROU	Catalina Circiu
20	DF	ROU	Cristina Rus
14	DF	ROU	Larisa-Denisa Olar
5	MF	ROU	Dariana Szalay
18	MF	ROU	Diana Bande
9	MF	ROU	Alexandra Buftea (Captain)
11	MF	ROU	Iulia Pop
19	FW	ROU	Patricia Zdroba
8	FW	ROU	Andreea Gulin
14	FW	ROU	Adriana Ilieș
17	FW	ROU	Georgiana Pâtcă

== Club officials ==
=== Board of directors ===
Role	Name
Honorary President	(Romania) Florin Ianoș
President	(Romania) Pop Daniel
Vice President	(Romania) Cristian Vasile Săsăran
Vice President	(Romania) Daniel Bujor	Sporting director	(Romania)
Youth Center Manager	(Romania) Daniel Lupuți
Organizer of Competitions	(Romania) -

- Last updated: 18 January 2019

=== Current technical staff ===
Role	Name
Manager	(Romania) Daniel Lupuți
Manager	(Romania) Robert Mezei
Assistant manager	(Romania) -
Fitness coaches	(Romania) Dana Dragos

- Last updated: 18 January 2019
