= Dolhești, Suceava =

Dolhești
- Commune
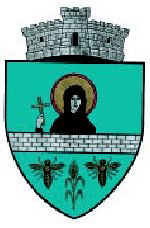
- Coat of arms

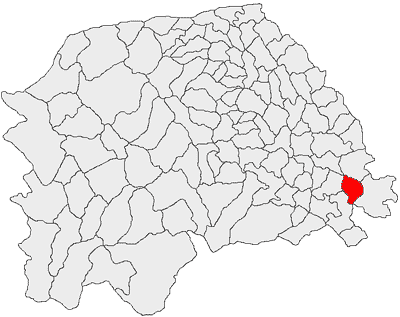
- Location in Suceava County

- Location in Romania
- Coordinates: 47°27′N 26°31′E
- Country: Romania
- County: Suceava
- Subdivisions: Dolheștii Mari, Dolheștii Mici, Valea Bourei

Government
  - Mayor (2024–2028): Cristinel Bărculescu (PSD)
- Area: 41 km^{2} (16 sq mi)
- Elevation: 259 m (850 ft)
- Population (2021-12-01): 3,312
  - Density: 81/km^{2} (210/sq mi)
- Time zone: EET/EEST (UTC+2/+3)
- Postal code: 727180
- Area code: (+40) x30
- Vehicle reg.: SV
- Website: www.comunadolhesti.ro

Dolhești is a commune located in Suceava County, Romania. It is composed of three villages: Dolheștii Mari (the commune center), Dolheștii Mici and Valea Bourei.

== Natives ==
- Violeta Szekely
