= CS Brazi (women) =

Romanian football club

- Full name: Club Sport Brazi
- Founded: 2002
- Dissolved: 2015
- Ground: Chimia
Home colours	Away colours

Club Sport Brazi was a Romanian football club from Brazi founded in 2002. It is best known for its women's team, which was created in 2010.
