= Trans-Sil Stadium =

Multi-use stadium in Târgu Mureș, Romania

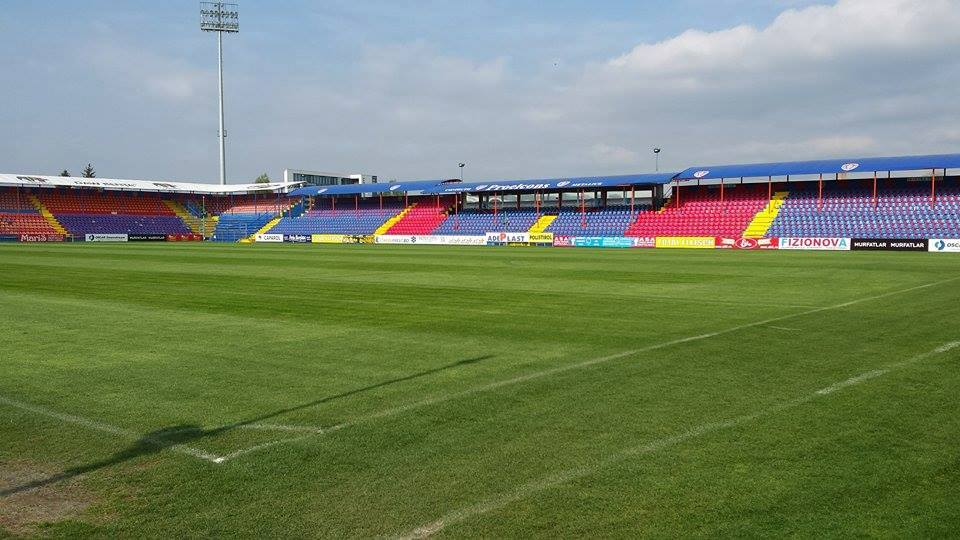
- Interactive map of Trans-Sil Stadium
- Former names: Matricon Stadium
- Address: Str. Insulei
- Location: Târgu Mureș, Romania
- Coordinates: 46°32′58.6″N 24°32′45″E
- Owner: Municipality of Târgu Mureș
- Operator: ASA Târgu Mureș
- Capacity: 8,200 seated
- Surface: Grass

Construction
- Opened: 2007
- Renovated: 2010
- Expanded: 2010

Tenants
- Trans-Sil Târgu Mureș (–2008); ASA 2013 Târgu Mureș (2008–2018); CSM Târgu Mureș (2018–2019); ASA Târgu Mureș (2021–present)

The Trans-Sil Stadium is a multi-use stadium in Târgu Mureș, Romania. It is currently used mostly for football and is the home ground of ASA Târgu Mureș. Before 2018 it was the home ground of Trans-Sil Târgu Mureș and ASA 2013 Târgu Mureș. The stadium has an all-seating capacity of 8,200 spectators.

It is also known as the Municipal Stadium and Siletina Stadium.

== See also ==
- List of football stadiums in Romania
