= FC Fair Play București =

Romanian football club

Fair Play București
- Full name: Fotbal Club Fair Play București
- Short name: Fair Play
- Founded: 29 April 2003; 22 years ago
- Dissolved: 2024
- Ground: Ciorogârla
- Capacity: 1,000
Home colours	Away colours

Fotbal Club Fair Play București, commonly known as Fair Play București, or simply Fair Play, was a Romanian women's football club based in Bucharest, Romania. Fair Play București was founded on 29 April 2003 and last played in the Liga II, second tier of the Romanian women's football system. From the 2020–2021 season, the team evolves with the FCSB emblem.

== Season by season ==
Champions Runners-up Third place Promoted Relegated

Season		Division	Tier	Place	Cup	WCL
1	2007–08	Liga I	1	8th	QF	–
2	2008–09	Liga I	1	9th	1R	–
3	2009–10	Liga I	1	10th	QF	–
4	2010–11	Liga I	1	12th	1R	–
5	2011–12	Liga I, Seria Est	1	11th	R16	–
6	2012–13	Liga I, Seria Sud	1	9th	R16	–
7	2013–14	Superliga	1	6th	R16	–
8	2014–15	Superliga	1	5th	SF	–
9	2015–16	Superliga	1	7th	SF	–
10	2016–17	Superliga	1	9th	R16	–
11	2017–18	Liga I	1	5th	QF	–
12	2018–19	Liga I	1	8th	QF	–
13	2019–20	Liga I	1	11th	R16	–
