= Vasas Femina FC =

Romanian football club

Vasas Femina
- Full name: Vasas Femina Fotbal Club Odorheiu Secuiesc
- Short name: Vasas
- Founded: 18 July 2012; 14 years ago
- Ground: Odorheiu Secuiesc Municipal Stadium
- Capacity: 5,000
- Chairman: László Béla
- Manager: János Székely
- League: Liga II
- 2024–25: Liga I, 6th
Home colours	Away colours

Vasas Femina Fotbal Club, commonly known as Vasas Femina, or simply Vasas, is a Romanian women's football club based in Odorheiu Secuiesc, Harghita County, Romania. The team was founded on 18 July 2012 and since then playing constantly in the Romanian leagues.

Vasas Femina currently plays in the Liga I, first tier of the Romanian women's football system, after ranking 2nd at the end of the 2017–18 season.

== Honours ==
=== Leagues ===
- Liga I
  - Runners-up (1): 2017–18
- Liga II
  - Runners-up (2): 2013–14, 2014–15

=== Cups ===
- Romanian Women's Cup
  - Winners (1): 2018–19

== Season by season ==
Champions Runners-up Third place Promoted Relegated

Season		Division	Tier	Place	Cup	WCL
1	2012–13	Liga I, Seria Est	1	10th	1R	–
2	2013–14	Liga I, Seria Nord	2	2nd	R16	–
3	2014–15	Liga I, Seria I	2	2nd	QF	–
4	2015–16	Superliga	1	8th	R16	–
5	2016–17	Superliga	1	6th	R16	–
6	2017–18	Liga I	1	2nd	SF	–
7	2018–19	Liga I	1	6th	W	–
8	2019–20	Liga I	1	4th	R16	–

== Club officials ==
=== Board of directors ===
Role	Name
President	(Romania) László Béla
Sporting Director	(Romania) Attila Vágó
Youth Center Manager	(Romania) Levente Mihálykó

- Last updated: 19 January 2019
- Source: Board of directors

=== Current technical staff ===
Role	Name
Manager	(Romania) János Székely
Goalkeeping Coach	(Romania) Géza Tamás
Fitness Coaches	(Romania) Sándor Nagy (Romania) Claudia Nedelcu

- Last updated: 19 January 2019
- Source: Technical staff
