= ACS Târgu Mureș (women's football) =

Târgu Mureș
- Full name: Târgu Mureș
- Founded: 2005; 21 years ago as City'US Târgu Mureș; 2009; 17 years ago as FCM Târgu Mureș; 2018; 8 years ago as CSM Târgu Mureș
- Manager: Carol Secheș
- League: Liga I
- 2023–24: Liga I, 8th
| Home colours | Away colours |

Târgu Mureş is a women's association football club from Târgu Mureş, Romania associated with the municipality of its host city.

== History ==
The team was first created by professor Istvan Kiss as a women's squad associated to his futsal club City'US Târgu Mureș. In 2008 a new entity that was to receive generous funding from the municipality of Târgu Mureş was formed, and the women's team switched to this club, participating in competitions under the name of FC Municipal Târgu Mureș, garnering success and immediately winning both the Liga I and the Romanian Cup. As such, they participated in the 2010–11 UEFA Women's Champions League qualifying round, where they won one of three matches, but failed to move on. In 2013 the club to which the team belonged changed its name to ASA 2013 Târgu Mureș. The team consistently played at the top of Romanian women's football, being either runners-up of winners of the two domestic competitions from 2010 until 2016, when it won its second and last Romanian Cup.

Financial difficulties became prevalent during the 2016–17 season, and especially during the 2017–18 one, when the team withdrew halfway through the championship, due to the municipality refusing to fund the club and others associated with it, citing irregularities that have been brewing in this period.

Shortly after, the municipality founded a new club on 19 December 2017, with the intention of picking up the separate teams in various sports (like the women's basketball team BC Sirius) that were bankrupted, under the umbrella of the new legal entity called CSM Târgu Mureș. Meanwhile, most of the women football players signed with local side Ladies Târgu Mureș until the summer, when they were recalled in order to restore the refounded team to its previous glory. However, since folding mid-season, they were relegated to the third tier of Romanian football by the federation. Coach was to be Carol Secheș, the first coach from the founding days of the City'US era, who also led the team in the Champions League in the FCM era and later on as ASA.

CSM promptly promoted in its first season in Liga III and was a serious contender to promote after just another season again to the Liga I, but was docked 6 points by the Federation's Ethics Committee in November 2019.

=== Chronology of names ===
| Period | Full Club Name | Short name |
|---|---|---|
| 2005–2009 | Asociația Sportivă City'US Târgu Mureș | City'US Târgu Mureș |
| 2009–2013 | Asociația Fotbal Club Municipal Târgu Mureș | FCM Târgu Mureș |
| 2013–2017 | Asociația Sportivă Ardealul 2013 Târgu Mureș | ASA Târgu Mureș |
| 2018–present | Clubul Sportiv Municipal Târgu Mureș | CSM Târgu Mureș |

== Kits and crest ==
The team originally used the crest of the club City'US Târgu Mureș. Between 2009 and 2013 club colours were orange and blue, and between 2013 and 2017 red and blue.

Since the CSM era, the team colors are white, blue and red. Thus, the main kit is all-white, while the alternate kit is light blue, though the team has on occasion mixed the shirts and shorts of the two kits.

| Kit used in the FCM era (2009–2013). | Alternate kit from the FCM era. | The main kit used in the ASA era (2013–2017). | Alternate kit used in the ASA era. |

== Achievements ==
- Liga I
  - Winners (1): 2009–10
  - Runners-up (6): 2010–11, 2011–12, 2012–13, 2013–14, 2014–15, 2015–16
- Liga III
  - Winners (1): 2018–19
- Romanian Women's Cup:
  - Winners (2): 2009–10, 2015–16
  - Runners-up (5): 2010–11, 2011–12, 2012–13, 2013–14, 2014–15

== Season by season ==
Champions Runners-up Third Place Promoted Relegated

| Season | | Division | Tier | Place | Cup | WCL |
|---|---|---|---|---|---|---|
| 1 | 2005–06 | Divizia A | 1 | ? | QF | – |
| 2 | 2006–07 | Liga I | 1 | 6th | ? | – |
| 3 | 2007–08 | Liga I | 1 | 5th | QF | – |
| 4 | 2008–09 | Liga I | 1 | 4th | ? | – |
| 5 | 2009–10 | Liga I | 1 | 1st | W | – |
| 6 | 2010–11 | Liga I | 1 | 2nd | F | Grp |
| 7 | 2011–12 | Liga I, Seria Est | 1 | 2nd | F | – |
| 8 | 2012–13 | Liga I, Seria Est | 1 | 2nd | F | – |
| 9 | 2013–14 | Superliga | 1 | 2nd | F | – |
| 10 | 2014–15 | Superliga | 1 | 2nd | F | – |
| 11 | 2015–16 | Superliga | 1 | 2nd | W | – |
| 12 | 2016–17 | Superliga | 1 | 4th | QF | – |
| 13 | 2017–18 | Liga I | 1 | 9th | R16 | – |
| 14 | 2018–19 | Liga III, Seria III | 3 | 1st | R16 | – |
| 15 | 2019–20 | Liga II, Seria II | 2 | TBD | 2R | – |

== Notable former players ==
- (Romania) Daniela Gurz
- (Romania) Andreea Părăluță
