= 2022–23 Liga I (women's football) =

Liga I
- Season: 2022–23
- Champions: U Olimpia Cluj; 12th Liga I title
- All statistics correct as of 21 August 2023.

The 2022–23 Liga I is the 33rd season of the top level women's football league of the Romanian football league system. 12 teams will play a one legged-round robin. The top 6 teams progress then to the play-offs, while the bottom 6 teams to the play-out, where a two-legged round-robin will take place. Teams ranked 11 and 12 (5 and 6 in the play-out) will relegate directly to the 2023–24 Liga II.

U Olimpia Cluj defended their title and won their 12th title.

== Team changes ==
=== To Liga I ===
Promoted from Liga II

- Csíkszereda Miercurea Ciuc (winner of 2021–22 Liga II, Seria I)
- Carmen București (runner-up of 2021–22 Liga II, Seria II)

=== From Liga I ===
Relegated to Liga II

- CSȘ Târgoviște (12th place in 2021–22 Liga I)

Disbanded

- Heniu Prundu Bârgăului (2nd place in 2021–22 Liga I)

=== Renamed teams ===
While still technically having remained a separate club for the duration of the 2021-22 season, and after using the Politehnica brand for one season, ACS Fortuna Becicherecu Mic was finally dissafiliated and the cession of participation rights in all women's football competitions to the SSU Politehnica Timișoara club was approved on 5 August 2022, finalizing a deal long in the making.

=== Excluded and spared teams ===
In the summer of 2022, Heniu Prundu Bârgăului was supposed to be taken over by the CS Gloria 2018 Bistrița-Năsăud club, which had more financial support. The move fell short due to identity issues, the main reason being the Heniu brand would have been suppressed in favor of the Gloria one. Heniu coach Călin Svoboda, along with a large part of the players opted to move to found the women's football section of Gloria 2018, while Heniu disbanded due to a combination of lack of players and financial support. As a consequence, the 11th place in the 2021-22 Liga I, Universitatea Galați was spared from relegation.

== Stadiums by capacity and location ==
Location of teams in 2022–23 Liga I

Club	City	Stadium	Capacity
CSM Alexandria	Alexandria	Municipal (Alexandria)	5,000
Banat Girls	Comloșu Mare	Comunal	
Carmen București	Giurgiu	Marin Anastasovici	8,500
Csiksereda Miercurea Ciuc	Miercurea Ciuc	Municipal (Miercurea Ciuc)	
Fair Play	Bucharest	Ciorogârla	1,000
Heniu	Prundu Bârgăului	Heniu	500
Fotbal Feminin	Baia Mare	Viorel Mateianu	7,000
Ladies Târgu Mureş	Târgu Mureş	Academia de Sport Mureşul	
U Olimpia Cluj	Cluj-Napoca	Clujana / Iclod Arena	
Piroș Security	Arad	Sânnicolaul Mic	1,500
Politehnica Femina	Timișoara	Stadionul Știința / Baza Poli 2	
Târgoviște	Târgoviște	Alpan (Șotânga)	1,000
Universitatea	Galați	Siderurgistul	6,000
Vasas Femina	Odorheiu Secuiesc	Municipal (Odorheiu Secuiesc)	5,000

== Regular season ==
Home \ Away	OLI	UGL	ALE	VAS	PIR	CAR	BMA	PTF	FPB	LTM	MIE	BGR
U Olimpia Cluj	—	—	—	8–2	—	4–0	—	0–3	—	7–0	3–0	4–0
Universitatea Galați	1–6	—	0–3	—	1–2	—	1–1	—	0–3	—	—	0–10
CSM Alexandria	0–3	—	—	3–0	—	0–3	—	—	3–0	2–0	—	—
Vasas Femina	—	3–0	—	—	3–1	—	3–0	0–3	—	—	0–0	—
Piroș Security Arad	0–13	—	3–3	—	—	0–8	—	—	2–2	0–1	—	—
Carmen București	—	10–0	—	8–0	—	—	—	0–1	—	9–0	2–0	5–1
Fotbal Feminin Baia Mare	0–11	—	1–3	—	2–0	0–5	—	—	3–0	—	—	—
Politehnica Timișoara	—	18–0	4–0	—	11–0	—	17–0	—	6–0	—	—	2–0
Fair Play București	2–15	—	—	1–4	—	0–6	—	—	—	6–5	1–5	0–3
Ladies Târgu Mureș	—	5–1	—	1–1	—	—	0–1	0–3	—	—	3–0	—
Csikszereda Miercurea Ciuc	—	8–0	3–2	—	2–0	—	4–0	0–7	—	—	—	1–0
Banat Girls	—	—	5–0	1–2	4–0	—	1–0	—	—	4–1	—	—

Source: Liga I Feminin
Legend: Blue = home team win; Yellow = draw; Red = away team win.

Pos	Team	Pld	W	D	L	GF	GA	GD	Pts	Qualification
1	Politehnica Timișoara	11	11	0	0	75	0	+75	33	Qualification to play-off
2	U Olimpia Cluj	11	10	0	1	74	8	+66	30	Qualification to play-off
3	Carmen București	11	9	0	2	56	6	+50	27	Qualification to play-off
4	Csikszereda Miercurea Ciuc	11	6	1	4	23	8	+15	19	Qualification to play-off
5	Banat Girls	11	6	0	5	29	15	+14	18	Qualification to play-off
6	Vasas Femina Odorhei	11	5	2	4	18	26	−8	17	Qualification to play-off
7	CSM Alexandria	11	5	1	5	19	20	−1	16	Qualification to play-out
8	Ladies Târgu Mureș	11	3	1	7	16	34	−18	10	Qualification to play-out
9	Fotbal Feminin Baia Mare	11	3	1	7	8	45	−37	10	Qualification to play-out
10	Piroș Security Arad	11	1	2	8	8	50	−42	5	Qualification to play-out
11	Fair Play București	11	2	1	8	15	52	−37	1 (Note: On September 28, 2022, Fair-Play Bucharest was sanctioned with 6 points.)	Qualification to play-out
12	Universitatea Galați	11	0	1	10	4	69	−65	1	Qualification to play-out

Source: FRF (in Romanian), Soccerway

=== Play-offs ===
Home \ Away	OLI	PTF	CAR	VAS	BGR	MIE
U Olimpia Cluj	—	7–0	1–3	8–1	6–2	3–0
Politehnica Timișoara	1–3	—	2–2	6–0	2–0	2–0
Carmen București	0–1	2–3	—	5–0	2–0	2–0
Vasas Femina	0–5	1–2	2–4	—	4–0	1–2
Banat Girls	0–1	0–3	0–4	2–1	—	2–2
Csikszereda Miercurea Ciuc	3–4	0–7	0–2	4–0	3–0	—

Source: Liga I Feminin
Legend: Blue = home team win; Yellow = draw; Red = away team win.

Pos	Team	Pld	W	D	L	GF	GA	GD	Pts	Qualification
1	U Olimpia Cluj (C)	10	9	0	1	39	10	+29	57	Champions League 2023-2024
2	Politehnica Timișoara	10	7	1	2	28	15	+13	55	
3	Carmen București (D, R)	10	7	1	2	26	9	+17	49	Disbanded at the end of the season
4	Csikszereda Miercurea Ciuc	10	3	1	6	14	23	−9	29	
5	Banat Girls	10	1	1	8	6	28	−22	22	
6	Vasas Femina (R)	10	1	0	9	10	38	−28	20	Relegation to the Second League

Source: Liga I Feminin
(C) Champions; (D) Disqualified; (R) Relegated

=== Play-outs ===
Home \ Away	PIR	BMA	ALE	LTM	FPB	UGL
Piroș Security Arad	—	0–1	0–5	0–4	2–2	1–0
Fotbal Feminin Baia Mare	0–1	—	3–4	0–2	3–1	4–0
CSM Alexandria	6–1	10–4	—	4–1	10–2	7–1
Ladies Târgu Mureș	2–2	7–1	2–1	—	3–0	2–0
Fair Play București	2–3	6–4	0–4	2–0	—	3–3
Universitatea Galați	1–3	1–0	1–5	0–6	0–2	—

Source: Liga I Feminin
Legend: Blue = home team win; Yellow = draw; Red = away team win.

Pos	Team	Pld	W	D	L	GF	GA	GD	Pts	Qualification
7	CSM Alexandria	10	9	0	1	56	15	+41	43	
8	Ladies Târgu Mureș	10	7	1	2	29	10	+19	32	
9	Piroș Security Arad (D, R)	10	4	2	4	13	23	−10	19	Disbanded at the end of the season
10	Fotbal Feminin Baia Mare (R)	10	3	0	7	20	32	−12	19 (Note: Fotbal Feminin Baia Mare withdrew at the end of the season)	Relegation to the Second League
11	Fair Play București (R)	10	3	2	5	20	32	−12	12	Relegation to the Second League
12	Universitatea Galați (R)	10	1	1	8	7	33	−26	5	Relegation to the Second League

Source: Liga I Feminin
(D) Disqualified; (R) Relegated
