= 2018–19 Liga II (women's football) =

Liga II Feminin
- Season: 2018–19
- Champions: Selena ȘN Constanța; Piroș Security Arad
- Matches played: 114
- Goals scored: 655 (5.75 per match)
- All statistics correct as of 30 August 2019.

The 2018–19 Liga II was the 6th season, since its reintroduction in 2013, of the second level women's football league of the Romanian football league system. 16 teams divided in 2 series played in the competition that consisted of a double round-robin lasting 14 stages, totaling 112 matches. In addition, a two-legged play-off was played to determine one more promoted team at the end of the season, since CFR Timișoara withdrew from Liga I and vacated a place.

== Team changes ==
=== To Liga II ===
Promoted from Liga III

- Vulpițele Galbene Roman (winners of 2017–18 Liga III, Seria I)
- Banat Girls Reșița (winners of 2017–18 Liga III, Seria II)
- Venus Maramureș (4th place in 2017–18 Liga III, Seria II)

Relegated from Liga I

- Luceafărul Filiași (took over the place of Liga I relegated team Real Craiova, 10th place in the 2017–18 Liga I)

=== From Liga II ===
Promoted to Liga I

- FC Universitatea Galați (winners of 2017–18 Liga II, Seria I)
- Independența Baia Mare (winners of 2017–18 Liga II, Seria II)

Relegated to Liga III

- Luceafărul 2 Filiași (took over the place of Real 2 Craiova, 6th place in the 2017–18 Liga II, Seria II, but transferred to Liga III as two teams from the same club cannot play in the same league)

Disbanded

- Armonia Dolhești (7th place in 2017–18 Liga I, Seria I)

=== Excluded and spared teams ===
Armonia Dolhești was disbanded in the summer of 2018, so Viitorul Reghin (8th place in 2017–18 Liga II, Seria I) was spared from relegation.

Luceafărul Filiași took over Real Craiova's spot after its relegation from 2017–18 Liga I, although some viewed it as just a name change. The move was possible by disaffiliating the old Real Craiova club and transferring the senior team components to Luceafărul Filiași Sport School, along with their club president, local politician Fănel Văduva. As such, the first squad was able to continue in Liga II, as they relegated at the end of the 2017–18 Liga I, thus they were not required to start in Liga III as it happens with new teams. Consequently, the spot of Real 2 Craiova, which was taken over by Luceafărul 2 Filiași was transferred to Liga III, as two teams from the same club cannot play in the same league.

== Teams ==
Location of clubs in the 2018–19 Liga II Feminin
- Seria I, - Seria II

=== Seria I ===
Club	City	Stadium	Capacity
Ladies Târgu Mureş	Târgu Mureş	Mureşeni	
Măgura 2012 Bacău	Bacău	Lucrețiu Avram	
Navobi Iași	Iași	Emil Alexandrescu II	1,000
Onix Râmnicu Sărat	Râmnicu Sărat	Onix	
Selena ȘN Constanța	Constanța	SNC	
Vasas 2 Odorhei	Odorheiu Secuiesc	Municipal	5,000
Viitorul Reghin	Reghin	Avântul	3,200
Vulpițele Galbene Roman	Roman	Moldova	

=== Seria II ===
Club	City	Stadium	Capacity
Venus Maramureș	Satulung	Satulung	
CS Ineu	Ineu	Stadionul Ineu	
Luceafărul	Filiași	CFR (Craiova)	3,000
Olimpia 2 Cluj	Cluj-Napoca	Victoria Someșeni	1,300
Olimpic Star Cluj	Cluj-Napoca	Academia Luceafarul	
Piroș Security Lioness	Arad	Șega	
Sporting Lugaș	Lugașu de Sus	Baza Sportivă PALEU, Oradea	
Banat Girls	Reșița	Mircea Chivu (sintetic)	

== League tables and Results ==
=== Seria I League table ===
Pos	Team	Pld	W	D	L	GF	GA	GD	Pts	Promotion
1	Selena ȘN Constanța	14	10	1	3	27	12	+15	31	Promotion to Liga I
2	Vulpițele Galbene Roman	14	8	1	5	28	24	+4	25	
3	Vasas 2 Odorhei	14	7	3	4	34	21	+13	24	
4	Viitorul Reghin	14	6	2	6	28	43	−15	20	
5	Onix Râmnicu Sărat	14	4	6	4	22	14	+8	18	
6	Ladies Târgu Mureş	14	5	3	6	25	24	+1	18	
7	Navobi Iași	14	5	1	8	23	26	−3	16	
8	Măgura 2012 Bacău	14	0	5	9	14	37	−23	5	

Updated to match(es) played on May 19, 2019. Source: FRF (in Romanian)
Rules for classification: 1) points; 2) goal difference; 3) number of goals scored.

=== Seria II League table ===
Pos	Team	Pld	W	D	L	GF	GA	GD	Pts	Promotion
1	Piroș Security Lioness	14	12	1	1	113	10	+103	37	Promotion to Liga I
2	Olimpia 2 Cluj	14	11	1	2	87	16	+71	34	
3	Luceafărul	14	11	0	3	95	14	+81	33	
4	Olimpic Star Cluj	14	6	0	8	51	36	+15	18	
5	ACS Banat Girls Reșița	14	6	0	8	23	44	−21	18	
6	Sporting Lugaș	14	5	1	8	35	64	−29	16	
7	ACS Venus Maramureș	14	2	1	11	21	76	−55	7	
8	CS Ineu	14	1	0	13	16	181	−165	3	

Updated to match(es) played on May 25, 2019. Source: FRF (in Romanian)
Rules for classification: 1) points; 2) goal difference; 3) number of goals scored.

=== Promotion play-off ===
The second best placed team in Seria I faces the second best placed team in Seria II (excluding second teams of Liga I clubs) to decide the last promoted club to 2019-20 Liga I, after CFR Timișoara withdrew during the 2018–19 Liga I season, and vacated a spot.

Team 1	Agg.	Team 2	1st leg	2nd leg
Vulpițele Galbene Roman	6–7	Luceafărul Filiași	6–6	0–1
