= 2019–20 Liga II (women's football) =

Liga II Feminin
- Season: 2019–20
- Champions: Carmen București; Banat Girls Reșița
- Matches played: 36
- Goals scored: 169 (4.69 per match)
- All statistics correct as of 11 May 2020.

The 2019–20 Liga II is the 7th season, since its reintroduction in 2013, of the second level women's football league of the Romanian football league system. The number of teams was reduced from 16 to 14. Therefore, 14 teams divided in 2 series were to play in the competition that consists of a double round-robin lasting 12 stages, totaling 84 matches. Since one team withdrew before the start of the competition, the total number of matches to be played became 72. However, only the first half of the season was played (36 games), until the season was frozen due to the 2019-20 coronavirus pandemic.

== Team changes ==
=== To Liga II ===
Promoted from Liga III

- Carmen București (winners of 2018-19 Liga III, Seria I)
- CN Nicu Gane Fălticeni (winners of 2018-19 Liga III, Seria II)
- CSM Târgu Mureș (winners of 2018-19 Liga III, Seria III)
- ACS Atletic Drobeta-Turnu-Severin (runners-up of 2018-19 Liga III, Seria I)

=== From Liga II ===
Promoted to Liga I

- Selena SN Constanța (winners of 2018-19 Liga II, Seria I)
- Piroș Security Lioness Arad (winners of 2018-19 Liga II, Seria I)
- Luceafărul Filiași (winners of 2018-19 Liga II Promotion Play-off)

Relegated to Liga III

- Viitorul Reghin (4th place in the 2018-19 Liga II, Seria I decided to enroll in Liga III, Seria III)
- Măgura 2012 Bacău (8th place in the 2018-19 Liga II decided to enroll in Liga III, Seria IV)

Disbanded

- CS Ineu (8th place in 2017-18 Liga II, Seria I, disbanded at senior level)

=== Excluded and spared teams ===
Viitorul Reghin requested to be enrolled in Liga III for the 2019–20 season, so Măgura 2012 Bacău (8th place in 2018-19 Liga II, Seria I) could have been spared from relegation due to lack of teams. However, Măgura 2012 Bacău decided to play in Liga III anyway. Due to this vacated spot, ACS Atletic Drobeta-Turnu-Severin was promoted to Liga II.

=== Renamed teams ===
Sporting Lugaș changed its name to ACS United Bihor at the start of the 2018–19 season.

== Stadiums by capacity and location ==
Location of clubs in the 2019–20 Liga II
- Seria I, - Seria II

=== Seria I ===
| Club | City | Stadium | Capacity |
|---|---|---|---|
| Carmen București | București | Ion Ţiriac | |
| Ladies Târgu Mureş | Târgu Mureş | Mureşeni | |
| Navobi Iași | Iași | Emil Alexandrescu II | 1,000 |
| Nicu Gane | Fălticeni | Tineretului (Fălticeni) | |
| Onix Râmnicu Sărat | Râmnicu Sărat | Onix | |
| Vasas 2 Odorhei | Odorheiu Secuiesc | Municipal | 5,000 |
| Vulpițele Galbene Roman | Roman | Moldova | |

=== Seria II ===
| Club | City | Stadium | Capacity |
|---|---|---|---|
| Atletic Drobeta | Drobeta-Turnu Severin | Termo | |
| Banat Girls | Reșița | Mircea Chivu (sintetic) | |
| CSM Târgu Mureș | Târgu Mureș | Stadionul Trans-Sil | 8,200 |
| Olimpia 2 Cluj | Cluj-Napoca | Clujana | 1,300 |
| Olimpic Star Cluj | Cluj-Napoca | Academia Luceafarul | |
| United Bihor | Lugașu de Sus | Baza Sportivă Paleu, Oradea | |
| Venus Maramureș | Satulung | Satulung | |

== Seria I Season results ==
=== Seria I League table ===
| Pos | Team | Pld | W | D | L | GF | GA | GD | Pts | Promotion |
|---|---|---|---|---|---|---|---|---|---|---|
| 1 | Carmen București | 6 | 6 | 0 | 0 | 24 | 4 | +20 | 18 | Promotion to Liga I |
| 2 | Vulpițele Galbene Roman | 6 | 5 | 0 | 1 | 20 | 8 | +12 | 15 | |
| 3 | Vasas 2 Odorhei | 6 | 3 | 0 | 3 | 10 | 10 | 0 | 9 | |
| 4 | Onix Râmnicu Sărat | 6 | 2 | 1 | 3 | 10 | 20 | −10 | 7 | |
| 5 | Ladies Târgu Mureş | 6 | 2 | 1 | 3 | 8 | 21 | −13 | 7 | |
| 6 | Nicu Gane Fălticeni | 6 | 1 | 0 | 5 | 12 | 16 | −4 | 3 | |
| 7 | Navobi Iași | 6 | 1 | 0 | 5 | 8 | 13 | −5 | 3 | |

Updated to match(es) played on April 21, 2020. Source: FRF (in Romanian)
Rules for classification: 1) points; 2) goal difference; 3) number of goals scored.

=== Seria I Results ===
| Home \ Away | CAR | LTM | NIA | NGF | ORS | V2O | VGR |
|---|---|---|---|---|---|---|---|
| Carmen București | — | 9–1 | canc. | 2–1 | 7–0 | canc. | canc. |
| Ladies Târgu Mureş | canc. | — | 3–2 | 3–2 | canc. | canc. | 0–3 |
| Navobi Iași | 1–2 | canc. | — | canc. | canc. | 3–0 | 1–3 |
| Nicu Gane Fălticeni | canc. | canc. | 4–1 | — | canc. | 1–2 | 2–4 |
| Onix Râmnicu Sărat | canc. | 1–1 | 1–0 | 4–2 | — | canc. | canc. |
| Vasas 2 Odorhei | 0–2 | 4–0 | canc. | canc. | 3–2 | — | canc. |
| Vulpițele Galbene Roman | 1–2 | canc. | canc. | canc. | 7–2 | 2–1 | — |

Updated to match(es) played on 29 October 2019. Source: Liga II
Legend: Blue = home team win; Yellow = draw; Red = away team win.

== Seria II Season results ==
=== Seria II League table ===
| Pos | Team | Pld | W | D | L | GF | GA | GD | Pts | Promotion |
|---|---|---|---|---|---|---|---|---|---|---|
| 1 | Banat Girls Reșița | 5 | 4 | 1 | 0 | 16 | 2 | +14 | 13 | Promotion to Liga I |
| 2 | Olimpia 2 Cluj | 5 | 3 | 0 | 2 | 18 | 14 | +4 | 9 | |
| 3 | Olimpic Star Cluj | 5 | 2 | 0 | 3 | 16 | 14 | +2 | 6 | |
| 4 | CSM Târgu Mureș | 5 | 3 | 2 | 0 | 16 | 6 | +10 | 5 (Note: CSM Târgu Mureș were deducted 6 points on 27 November 2019.) | |
| 5 | United Bihor | 5 | 1 | 0 | 4 | 6 | 20 | −14 | 3 | |
| 6 | Atletic Drobeta | 5 | 0 | 1 | 4 | 5 | 21 | −16 | 1 | |
| 7 | ACS Venus Maramureș | 0 | 0 | 0 | 0 | 0 | 0 | 0 | 0 (Note: ACS Venus Maramureș withdrew from the championship a few weeks before it started.) | Withdrew |

Updated to match(es) played on October 23, 2019. Source: FRF (in Romanian)
Rules for classification: 1) points; 2) goal difference; 3) number of goals scored.

=== Seria II Results ===
| Home \ Away | ADT | BGR | TGM | O2C | OSC | LUG | VNM |
|---|---|---|---|---|---|---|---|
| Atletic Drobeta | — | 1–6 | 2–2 | canc. | canc. | 1–4 | canc. |
| Banat Girls Reșița | canc. | — | 0–0 | 4–0 | canc. | 4–0 | canc. |
| CSM Târgu Mureș | canc. | canc. | — | 7–2 | 4–2 | canc. | canc. |
| Olimpia 2 Cluj | 6–0 | canc. | canc. | — | 7–1 | canc. | canc. |
| Olimpic Star Cluj | 3–1 | 1–2 | canc. | canc. | — | 9–0 | canc. |
| United Bihor | canc. | canc. | 0–3 | 2–3 | canc. | — | canc. |
| ACS Venus Maramureș | canc. | canc. | canc. | canc. | canc. | canc. | — |

Updated to match(es) played on 23 October 2019. Source: Liga II
Legend: Blue = home team win; Yellow = draw; Red = away team win.
