= Androniki Michalopoulou =

Greek footballer

Niki Michalopoulou
Personal information
- Full name: Androniki Michalopoulou
- Date of birth: 10 June 1998 (age 28)
- Place of birth: Athens, Greece
- Position: Defender

Team information
- Current team: Puskás Akadémia FC
- Number: 33

Senior career*
Years	Team	Apps	(Gls)
2014–2016	Ialysos		
2016	Atromitos		
2017–2021	Agia Paraskevi	50	(0)
2021–2022	Medyk Konin	32	(5)
2022–2023	Carmen București	25	(9)
2023–2024	Farul Constanța	11	(0)
2024	FK Csíkszereda	12	(3)
2024–2025	Pogoń Szczecin	13	(0)
2025–	Puskás Akadémia	20	(3)

International career^{‡}
2023–	Greece	5	(0)
- * Club domestic league appearances and goals as of 3 June 2026 ‡ National team caps and goals as of 3 June 2026

Niki Michalopoulou (born 11 June 1998) is a Greek professional footballer who plays as a defender for Puskás Akadémia in the Női NB I and the Greece national team.

== Club career ==
=== Ialysos ===
Niki Michalopoulou was born in Athens and grew up in Rhodes, where she started her career with Trianton Ialysos in 2014. In her second season, the club won promotion to the second division, while she finished as top goal scorer of the group.

=== Atromitos ===
At the age of 18, she moved to Athens to study in the UoA and she joined A Division club Atromitos, but she only stayed for five months, before signing with Agia Paraskevi in the Greek B Division.

=== Agia Paraskevi ===
In the second half of the 2016–17 season, she helped them reach the promotion playoffs, but they lost to Feidon Argous on penalties. In the 2017/18 season, they finished top of their group and got promoted to the Greek A Division, but they were immediately relegated back to the second tier in 2018/19. In 2019–20, they once again were top of their group and returned to the first tier. Niki left the club in January 2021, in a season where they finished 4th in the league. In total, Michalopoulou made 50 appearances for Agia Paraskevi.

=== Medyk Konin ===
In the winter of 2021, she made her first move abroad, signing for Polish club Medyk Konin. In the second half of the 2020–21 season, she made 10 league appearances, scored twice and recorded two assists as her team finished 4th in the Ekstraliga. In the following campaign, she made 27 appearances, contributing four goals and one assist, while the club finished 6th in the league.

=== Carmen București ===
In the summer of 2022, she moved to Romanian side Carmen București. In the 2022–23 season, she made 25 appearances and scored nine goals, helping them finish 3rd in Liga I and win the Cupa României, beating Olimpia Cluj in the final.

=== Farul Constanța ===
On 23 July 2023, she joined newly promoted Liga I club Farul Constanța where she stayed for the first half of the 2023–24 SuperLiga season. She made 11 appearances, helping the club finish 2nd in the regular season and qualify for the play-offs. Farul went on to become champions for the first time in their history, two years after their founding.

=== Csíkszereda ===
In February 2024, Niki joined Csíkszereda. She scored 5 goals in 16 matches as they finished 3rd in the Liga I play-offs and reached the final of the Cupa României, in which they lost in extra time to Olimpia Cluj.

=== Pogoń Szczecin ===
On 29 July 2024, she returned to Poland to play for defending champions Pogoń Szczecin. She made 16 appearances, including her Champions League debut when she came off the bench for Weronika Szymaszek in an 1–0 loss against Servette. Pogoń finished 2nd in the league and reached the cup final where they lost on penalties to Czarni Sosnowiec.

=== Puskás Akadémia ===
On 2 August 2025, she transferred to Hungarian club Puskás Akadémia. She made 22 appearances and scored three goals in her first season, as the club reached the championship final but lost over two legs to Ferencváros.

== Honours ==
Ialysos

- Gamma Ethniki: 2015–16

Agia Paraskevi

- Greek B Division: 2017–18, 2019–20

Carmen București

- Cupa României: 2022–23

Farul Constanța

- Liga I: 2023–24

Csíkszereda

- Cupa României; runner-up: 2023–24

Pogoń Szczecin

- Ekstraliga; runner-up: 2024–25
- Polish Cup; runner-up: 2024–25

Puskás Akadémia

- Nemzeti Bajnokság I; runner-up: 2025–26
