= FK Csíkszereda Miercurea Ciuc (women's football) =

Romanian football club

FK Csíkszereda
- Full name: Asociația Futball Klub Csíkszereda Miercurea Ciuc
- Nicknames: Ciucanii (The Ciuc People); Székelyek / Secuii (The Székelys); Vörös-feketék / Roș-negrii (The Red and Whites)
- Short name: Csíki, Ciuc
- Founded: 2018; 8 years ago
- Ground: Miercurea Ciuc Municipal Stadium
- Capacity: 4,500
- Owner: Miercurea Ciuc Municipality
- Chairman: Eugen Pîrvulescu
- Manager: Peter Kollár
- League: Liga I
- 2025–26: Liga I, 2nd
- Website: https://fkcsikszereda.ro/
Home colours	Away colours

Asociația Futball Klub Csíkszereda Miercurea Ciuc (Hungarian: [ˈt͡ʃiːksɛrɛdɒ], Romanian: [ˈmjerkure̯a ˈtʃjuk]), commonly known as Csíkszereda Miercurea Ciuc or simply Csíkszereda, is a Romanian women's football club based in Miercurea Ciuc, Harghita County. The club was founded in 2018, and played for the first time in Liga I in the 2022–23 Liga I season, where they finished 4th.

== Honours ==
- Liga II
  - Winners (1): 2021–22
  - Runners-up (1): 2020–21
- Liga III
  - Runners-up (1): 2019–20
- Cupa României
  - Winners (1): 2024–25
  - Runners-up (1): 2023–24

== Season by season ==
Champions Runners-up Third place Promoted Relegated

Season		Division	Tier	Place	Cup	WCL
1	2018–19	Liga III	3	3rd	2R	–
2	2019–20	Liga III	3	2nd (P)	2R	–
3	2020–21	Liga II	2	2nd	2R	–
4	2021–22	Liga II	2	1st (C, P)	2R	–
5	2022–23	Liga I	1	4th	SF	–
6	2023–24	Liga I	1	3rd	GS	–

== Current squad ==
As of 21 April 2024

Note: Flags indicate national team as defined under FIFA eligibility rules; some limited exceptions apply. Players may hold more than one non-FIFA nationality.

No.	Pos.	Nation	Player
—	GK	ROU	Tankó Réka
—	GK	ROU	Balog Boglárka
—	GK	HUN	Böröcz Bettina
—	DF	ROU	Péter Kinga (Captain)
—	DF	ROU	Albu Erika
—	DF	ROU	Szentes Szabina
—	DF	ROU	Bartalis Barbara
—	DF	ROU	Abos Bianka
—	DF	ROU	Haraszti Fanni
—	MF	ROU	Szőke Eszter
—	MF	ROU	Antal Anita

No.	Pos.	Nation	Player
—	MF	ROU	Péter Alexandra
—	MF	ROU	Nyéki Anna
—	MF	ROU	Fülöp Boglárka
—	MF	ROU	Fülöp Boglárka
—	MF	ROU	Orbán Aranka
—	MF	ROU	Andrea Herczeg
—	FW	ROU	Györgyicze Réka
—	FW	ROU	Balázs Eszter
—	FW	HUN	Magyarics Zoé
—	FW	ROU	Rita Mitri
—	FW	HUN	Melánia Tóbik

== Club officials ==
=== Board of directors ===
Role	Name
Owner	(Romania) Miercurea Ciuc Municipality
President	(Romania) Zoltán Szondy
Board members	(Romania) István Fodor (Romania) Tibor Negoiţă (Romania) Előd Papp
Economic Director	(Romania) Albin Bíró
General Manager	(Romania) Eugen Pîrvulescu
Technical director	(Hungary) Csaba László
Sporting director	(Romania) Szilárd Cseke
Youth Center Director	(Romania) Zoltán Dusinszki
Delegate	(Romania) Claudiu Cazan
Press Officer	(Romania) Zoltán Szép

=== Current technical staff ===
Role	Name
Head coach	(Romania) Peter Kollár
Assistant coaches	(Romania) László Albu (Romania) Barna Bajkó
Video Analyst	(Romania) Áron Keszler
Goalkeeping coach	(Romania) Barna Nagy
Fitness coach	(Romania) Áron Vellai
Club doctor	(Romania) Nóra Sütő
Physiotherapist	(Romania) Angyal Gaál
Masseurs	(Romania) Botond Bálint (Romania) László Mikó
Storeman	(Romania) Gergely Bölöny
