= 2015–16 Romanian Superliga (women's football) =

Superliga
- Season: 2015–16
- Champions: Olimpia Cluj
- Relegated: no team
- Women's UCL: Olimpia Cluj
- Matches: 80
- Goals: 448 (5.6 per match)
- All statistics correct as of 3 April 2016.

The 2015–16 season of Romania's top level women's football league was the third under the new name Superliga. The old name Liga I is now being used for the new second-level league. It is the 26th season of top-level football and will decide the Romanian champions and UEFA Women's Champions League participant.

Olimpia Cluj were the defending champions.

== Changes from 2014 to 2015 ==
- Universitatea Alexandria, CS Brazi and CFR Timişoara were relegated to Liga I.
- Navobi Iași, Independența Baia Mare and Vasas Odorhei were promoted to Superliga.

== 2015/16 teams ==
Location of clubs in the 2015/16 Superliga

Club	City	Stadium	Capacity
Fair Play București	București	Politehnica	1,000
Heniu Prundu Bârgăului	Prundu Bârgăului	Heniu	500
Independența Baia Mare	Baia Mare	Viorel Mateianu	15,500
Navobi Iași	Iași	Emil Alexandrescu II	1,000
Olimpia	Cluj-Napoca	Victoria Someșeni	1,300
Real	Craiova	Electroputere	2,000
Târgu Mureş	Târgu Mureș	Trans-Sil	8,200
Vasas Odorhei	Odorheiu Secuiesc	Municipal	5,000

== Format ==
The 8 teams play each other twice, for a total of 14 matches, with the top four teams qualifying for a championship round and the bottom four teams playing a relegation round. Points accumulated at the regular season are halved and added to the points of the final stage rounds.

== Regular season ==
=== League table ===
Pos	Team	Pld	W	D	L	GF	GA	GD	Pts	Qualification or relegation
1	Olimpia Cluj	14	13	1	0	103	4	+99	40	Championship group
2	ASA 2013 Târgu Mureș	14	12	1	1	62	6	+56	37	Championship group
3	Navobi Iași	14	7	1	6	39	32	+7	22	Championship group
4	Vasas Odorhei	14	7	0	7	15	36	−21	21	Championship group
5	Real Craiova	14	6	1	7	26	30	−4	19	Relegation group
6	Fair Play București	14	5	0	9	16	58	−42	15	Relegation group
7	Independența Baia Mare	14	3	0	11	14	51	−37	9	Relegation group
8	Heniu Prundu Bârgăului	14	1	0	13	8	66	−58	3	Relegation group

Source: FRF (in Romanian)
Rules for classification: 1) Points; 2) Head-to-head points; 3) Head-to-head goal difference; 4) Head-to-head goals scored; 5) Head-to-head away goals scored; 6) Goal difference; 7) Number of goals scored

=== Results ===
Home \ Away	FAI	HEN	IND	NAV	OLI	REA	TAR	VAS
Fair Play București		2–6	3–1	2–1	0–4	1–0	0–5	3–0
Heniu Prundu Bârgăului	0–3		0–2	0–8	0–11	0–5		0–1
Independența Baia Mare	2–0	4–0		2–3	0–6	0–1	0–7	0–1
Navobi Iași	4–1	7–1	5–1		1–4	4–0	1–2	
Olimpia Cluj		8–0	12–0	10–1		8–0	3–0	10–0
Real Craiova	3–1	6–0		1–1	0–2		0–2	5–1
ASA 2013 Târgu Mureș	11–0	6–0	8–0	4–0	2–2	5–0		4–0
Vasas Odorhei	1–0	2–1	2–0	1–2	0–3	3–2	0–5	

Updated to match(es) played on 3 April 2016. Source: FRF (in Romanian)
Legend: Blue = home team win; Yellow = draw; Red = away team win.

== Final Stage ==
Each team carries the points of the regular season (which are halved and rounded up), adding them to the points scored at this final stage.

=== Championship Group ===
Played by the teams placed first to fourth of the regular season. Teams play each other twice.

League table

Pos	Team	Pld	W	D	L	GF	GA	GD	Pts	Qualification or relegation
1	Olimpia Cluj (C, Q)	6	6	0	0	39	4	+35	38	Qualification to Women's Champions League
2	ASA 2013 Târgu Mureș	6	3	0	3	21	10	+11	28	
3	Navobi Iași	6	2	1	3	11	20	−9	18	
4	Vasas Odorhei	6	0	1	5	4	41	−37	12	

Rules for classification: 1) Points; 2) Head-to-head points; 3) Head-to-head goal difference; 4) Head-to-head goals scored; 5) Head-to-head away goals scored; 6) Goal difference; 7) Number of goals scored
(C) Champions; (Q) Qualified for the phase indicated

=== Relegation Group ===
Played by the teams placed fifth to eighth of the regular season. Teams play each other twice. Because of the league expansion from 8 to 10 teams, no team was relegated and all of the four played the next season as well.

League table

Pos	Team	Pld	W	D	L	GF	GA	GD	Pts
1	Real Craiova	6	4	0	2	29	11	+18	22
2	Independența Baia Mare	6	5	1	0	25	9	+16	21
3	Fair Play București	6	0	1	5	15	53	−38	9
4	Heniu Prundu Bârgăului	6	2	0	4	21	17	+4	8

First match(es) will be played: April 2016. Source:
Rules for classification: 1) Points; 2) Head-to-head points; 3) Head-to-head goal difference; 4) Head-to-head goals scored; 5) Head-to-head away goals scored; 6) Goal difference; 7) Number of goals scored
