= 2019–20 Liga III (women's football) =

Liga III Feminin
- Season: 2019–20
- Champions: Dream Team București; Politehnica Timişoara; Student Sport Alba Iulia; Csiksereda Miercurea Ciuc
- Matches played: 44
- All statistics correct as of 21 April 2020.

The 2019–20 Liga III was the 4th season, since its introduction in 2016, of the third level women's football league of the Romanian football league system. The number of starting teams in Liga III increased from 18 to 19. Therefore, 19 teams divided in 4 series (of 4 or 5 teams) were to play in the competition that consists of a double round-robin lasting 6 or 10 stages, totalling 72 matches. Since one team withdrew before the start of the competition, the total number of matches to be played became 64. However, only 44 games were played until the season was frozen due to the 2019-20 coronavirus pandemic.

== Team changes ==
=== To Liga III ===
Relegated to Liga III

- Viitorul Reghin (4th place in the 2018–19 Liga II, Seria I, decided to enroll in Liga III)
- Măgura 2012 Bacău (8th place in the 2018–19 Liga II, Seria II, decided to enroll in Liga III)

New founded teams

- FCM Târgoviște
- Politehnica Timişoara
- Viitorul Arad
- Colţea 1920 Braşov
- Măgura Cisnădie
- Student Sport Alba Iulia

=== From Liga III ===
Promoted to Liga II

- Carmen București (winners of 2018–19 Liga III, Seria I)
- CN Nicu Gane Fălticeni (winners of 2018–19 Liga III, Seria II)
- CSM Târgu Mureș (winners of 2018–19 Liga III, Seria III)
- ACS Atletic Drobeta-Turnu-Severin (runners-up of 2018–19 Liga III, Seria I)

Disbanded

- FC Onești
- Independența 2 Baia Mare
- Sporting Lugaș 2

=== Excluded and spared teams ===
Viitorul Reghin requested to be enrolled in Liga III for the 2019–20 season, so Măgura 2012 Bacău (8th place in 2018–19 Liga II, Seria I) was to be spared from relegation to Liga III, due to lack of teams. However, Măgura 2012 Bacău decided to play in Liga III anyway. Due to this vacated spot, ACS Atletic Drobeta-Turnu-Severin was promoted to Liga II.

== Stadiums by capacity and location ==
Location of clubs in Location of teams in the 2019–20 Liga III
– Seria I, – Seria II, – Seria III, – Seria IV

=== Seria I ===
Club	City	Stadium	Capacity
ACS Activ Slobozia	Slobozia	Baza Bucu, Ialomița	
Dream Team București	București	Ion Ţiriac	
SCM Dunărea 2020 Giurgiu	Giurgiu	Astra 2 Stadium	
AS FC Progresul Bucureşti	Bucureşti	Ion Ţiriac	
FCM Târgoviște	Târgoviște	Alpan (Șotânga)	1,000

=== Seria II ===
Club	City	Stadium	Capacity
Juventus Timișoara	Timișoara	Baza Colterm, Timișoara	
Luceafarul 2 Filiași	Filiași	Orăşenesc (Filiași)	
Politehnica Timişoara	Timișoara	Baza Poli 2, Timișoara	
ACS Viitorul Arad	Arad	Baza Sportivă Livada	

=== Seria III ===
Club	City	Stadium	Capacity
Atletic Olimpia Gherla	Gherla	Stadionul Olimpia, Gherla	
ACS Colţea 1920 Braşov	Braşov	Unirea (Tărlungeni)	
CS Măgura Cisnădie	Cisnădie	Stadionul Textila, Cisnădie	
ACS Student Sport Alba Iulia	Alba Iulia	Cetate (Alba Iulia)	18,000
Viitorul Reghin	Reghin	Avântul	3,200

=== Seria IV ===
Club	City	Stadium	Capacity
Csiksereda Miercurea Ciuc	Miercurea Ciuc	Municipal (Miercurea Ciuc)	
CSM Pașcani	Pașcani	CSM Pașcani	
Măgura 2012 Bacău	Bacău	Lucrețiu Avram	
ACS Universitatea 2 Galați	Galați	Siderurgistul	6,000
Zimbrul Tulcea	Tulcea	Stadionul Comunal, Topolog	

== Seria I Season results ==
=== Seria I League table ===
Pos	Team	Pld	W	D	L	GF	GA	GD	Pts	Promotion
1	Dream Team București	6	6	0	0	48	6	+42	18	Promotion to Liga II
2	SCM Dunărea 2020 Giurgiu	6	3	0	3	28	20	+8	9	
3	Activ Slobozia	6	3	0	3	24	31	−7	9	
4	FCM Târgoviște	5	1	1	3	15	34	−19	4	
5	Progresul Bucureşti	5	0	1	4	3	27	−24	1	

Updated to match(es) played on October 21, 2019. Source: FRF (in Romanian)
Rules for classification: 1) points; 2) goal difference; 3) number of goals scored.

=== Seria I Results ===
Home \ Away	ACT	DTB	DUG	PRB	TAR
Activ Slobozia	—	4–7	2–1	5–1	canc.
Dream Team București	12–0	—	2–1	7–0	canc.
SCM Dunărea 2020 Giurgiu	9–5	canc.	—	4–0	12–1
Progresul Bucureşti	canc.	0–9	canc.	—	2–2
FCM Târgoviște	1–8	1–11	10–1	canc.	—

Updated to match(es) played on 21 April 2020. Source: Liga III
Legend: Blue = home team win; Yellow = draw; Red = away team win.

== Seria II Season results ==
=== Seria II League table ===
Pos	Team	Pld	W	D	L	GF	GA	GD	Pts	Promotion
1	Politehnica Timişoara	5	5	0	0	38	7	+31	15	Promotion to Liga II
2	Viitorul Arad	5	2	0	3	14	15	−1	6	
3	Luceafărul 2 Filiași	5	2	0	3	7	17	−10	6	
4	Juventus Timișoara	5	1	0	4	4	24	−20	3	

Updated to match(es) played on May 12, 2020. Source: FRF (in Romanian)
Rules for classification: 1) points; 2) goal difference; 3) number of goals scored.

=== Seria II Results ===
Home \ Away	JTM	L2F	PTM	VIA
Juventus Timișoara	—	0–3	1–6	canc.
Luceafărul 2 Filiași	0–3	—	canc.	3–0
Politehnica Timişoara	9–0	11–1	—	7–3
Viitorul Arad	6–0	3–0	2–5	—

Updated to match(es) played on 21 April 2020. Source: Liga III
Legend: Blue = home team win; Yellow = draw; Red = away team win.

== Seria III Season results ==
=== Seria III League table ===
Pos	Team	Pld	W	D	L	GF	GA	GD	Pts	Promotion
1	Student Sport Alba Iulia	3	3	0	0	9	2	+7	9	Promotion to Liga II
2	Colţea 1920 Braşov	4	2	1	1	12	4	+8	7	
3	Măgura Cisnădie	3	1	1	1	5	6	−1	4	
4	Atletic Olimpia Gherla	4	0	0	4	3	17	−14	0	
5	Viitorul Reghin	0	0	0	0	0	0	0	0 (Note: Viitorul Reghin withdrew from the championship at the start.)	Withdrew

Updated to match(es) played on April 21, 2020. Source: FRF (in Romanian)
Rules for classification: 1) points; 2) goal difference; 3) number of goals scored.

=== Seria III Results ===
Home \ Away	AOG	CBR	MCI	SSA	REG
Atletic Olimpia Gherla	—	1–3	2–3	canc.	canc.
Colţea 1920 Braşov	7–0	—	canc.	1–2	canc.
Măgura Cisnădie	canc.	1–1	—	canc.	canc.
Student Sport Alba Iulia	4–0	canc.	3–1	—	canc.
Viitorul Reghin	canc.	canc.	canc.	canc.	—

Updated to match(es) played on 21 April 2020. Source: Liga III
Legend: Blue = home team win; Yellow = draw; Red = away team win.

== Seria IV Season results ==
=== Seria IV League table ===
Pos	Team	Pld	W	D	L	GF	GA	GD	Pts	Promotion
1	Măgura 2012 Bacău	5	4	0	1	16	8	+8	12	Promotion to Liga II
2	Csiksereda Miercurea Ciuc	4	3	1	0	22	1	+21	10	Promotion to Liga II
3	Universitatea 2 Galați	5	2	1	2	6	17	−11	7	
4	Zimbrul Tulcea	6	2	0	4	10	19	−9	6	
5	CSM Pașcani	6	0	2	4	3	12	−9	2	

Updated to match(es) played on April 21, 2020. Source: FRF (in Romanian)
Rules for classification: 1) points; 2) goal difference; 3) number of goals scored.

=== Seria IV Results ===
Home \ Away	CMC	PAS	M2B	U2G	ZTL
Csiksereda Miercurea Ciuc	—	canc.	5–1	10–0	canc.
CSM Pașcani	0–0	—	canc.	2–2	0–3
Măgura 2012 Bacău	canc.	4–0	—	canc.	5–3
Universitatea 2 Galați	canc.	1–0	0–3	—	3–2
Zimbrul Tulcea	0–7	2–1	0–3	canc.	—

Updated to match(es) played on 21 April 2020. Source: Liga III
Legend: Blue = home team win; Yellow = draw; Red = away team win.
