= 2016–17 Romanian Superliga (women's football) =

Superliga
- Season: 2016–17
- Champions: Olimpia Cluj
- Relegated: Navobi Iași, Independența Baia Mare
- Women's UCL: Olimpia Cluj
- Matches: 90
- All statistics correct as of 17 March 2017.

The 2016–17 season of Romania's top level women's football league was the fourth under the new name Superliga. It is the 27th season of top-level football and will decide the Romanian champions and UEFA Women's Champions League participant.

Olimpia Cluj were the defending champions.

== Team changes ==
=== To Liga I ===
Promoted from Liga II

- CSS Târgovişte (winner of 2015–16 Liga II, Seria I)
- CFR Timișoara (winner of 2015–16 Liga II, Seria II)

=== From Liga I ===
none

== Stadiums by capacity and location ==
Location of teams in 2016–17 Superliga

Club	City	Stadium	Capacity
CFR Timișoara	Timișoara	CFR	7,000
CSS Târgovişte	Șotânga	Alpan	1,000
Fair Play București	București	Politehnica	1,000
Heniu Prundu Bârgăului	Prundu Bârgăului	Heniu	500
Independența Baia Mare	Baia Mare	Viorel Mateianu	15,500
Navobi Iași	Iași	Emil Alexandrescu II	1,000
Olimpia Cluj	Cluj-Napoca	Victoria Someșeni	1,300
Real Craiova	Craiova	Electroputere	2,000
ASA Târgu Mureş	Târgu Mureș	Trans-Sil	8,200
Vasas Odorhei	Odorheiu Secuiesc	Municipal	5,000

== League table ==
Pos	Team	Pld	W	D	L	GF	GA	GD	Pts	Qualification or relegation
1	Olimpia Cluj (C, Q)	18	18	0	0	143	7	+136	54	Qualification to Women's Champions League
2	Navobi Iași (R)	18	12	2	4	74	29	+45	38	Relegation to Liga II
3	CFR Timișoara	18	11	2	5	69	38	+31	35	
4	Târgu Mureş	18	10	1	7	69	35	+34	31	
5	Heniu Prundu Bârgăului	18	9	0	9	49	51	−2	27	
6	Vasas Odorhei	18	6	3	9	24	53	−29	21	
7	CSS Târgovişte	18	6	2	10	35	70	−35	20	
8	Real Craiova	18	6	0	12	26	74	−48	18	
9	Fair Play București	18	3	1	14	37	103	−66	10	
10	Independența Baia Mare (R)	18	2	3	13	22	88	−66	9	Relegation to Liga II

Source: FRF (archived) (in Romanian)
Rules for classification: 1) Points; 2) Head-to-head points; 3) Head-to-head goal difference; 4) Head-to-head goals scored; 5) Head-to-head away goals scored 6) Goal difference; 7) Goals scored.
(C) Champions; (Q) Qualified for the phase indicated; (R) Relegated
