= 2020–21 Cupa României (women's football) =

2020–21 Cupa României Feminin
Cupa României 2020–21

Tournament details
- Country: Romania
- Teams: 38

Final positions
- Champions: U Olimpia Cluj
- Runners-up: Heniu Prundu Bârgăului

Tournament statistics
- Matches played: 37
- Goals scored: 297 (8.03 per match)

The 2020–21 Cupa României was the 18th season of the annual Romanian primary football knockout tournament.

== Participating clubs ==
The following 38 teams qualified for the competition:

2020–21 Liga I all clubs (12)	2020–21 Liga II without 2 second teams (15)	2020–21 Liga III without 1 second team (11)
entering in Second Round/ Round of 32: Fair Play București; Fortuna Becicherecu Mic; Heniu Prundu Bârgăului; U Olimpia Cluj; Universitatea Galați; Carmen București; Fotbal Feminin Baia Mare; Universitatea Alexandria; Vasas Femina Odorhei; Selena ȘN Constanța; Piroș Security Arad; Banat Girls Reșița	entering in Second Round/ Round of 32: CSȘ Târgoviște; Luceafărul Filiași; Ladies Târgu Mureş; Navobi Iași; Nicu Gane Fălticeni; Onix Râmnicu Sărat; Vulpițele Galbene Roman; Atletic Drobeta-Turnu-Severin; CSM Târgu Mureș; Olimpic Star Cluj; United Bihor; Politehnica Timişoara; Dream Team București; Csiksereda Miercurea Ciuc; Măgura 2012 Bacău	entering in preliminary round: Academia de Fotbal şi Tenis Măgura; Sporting Craiova; entering in First Round: Zimbrul Tulcea; Viitorul Arad; Atletic Olimpia Gherla; Juventus Timișoara; CSM Pașcani; Activ Slobozia; Dunărea 2020 Giurgiu; Colţea 1920 Braşov; FCM Târgoviște

== Round dates ==
Round	First match date	Reference date	Last match date
Preliminary round	3 March 2021		
First Round	7 March 2021		17 March 2021
Second Round/ Round of 32	24 March 2021		
Round of 16	28 April 2021		
Quarterfinals	12 May 2021		
Semifinals	2 June 2021 (Note: originally scheduled for 30 May 2021)		
Final	6 June 2021		

== Preliminary round ==
2 Liga III teams entered the competition for the preliminary round. The match was scheduled for Wednesday, 3 March, but did not take place, Academia de Fotbal şi Tenis Măgura progressing to the next round.

3 March 2021	Academia de Fotbal şi Tenis Măgura (3)	3–0 (awd.)	Sporting Craiova (3)	Cisnădie
15:00 EST (UTC+2)		Report (FRF)		Stadium: Textila; Referee: Demetrescu Iuliana Elena; Assistant referees: Bălan Marius, Lucaciu Doru Claudiu

== First round ==
The team that advanced from the preliminary round will be joined by the remaining 9 Liga III teams, for a total of 10 teams. The majority of the matches in this round are scheduled for Sunday, 7 March.

7 March 2021	Viitorul Arad (3)	26–0	Juventus Timișoara (3)	Livada, Arad
15:00 EST (UTC+2)		Report (FRF)		Stadium: Baza Sportivă Livada; Referee: Recorean Roxana; Assistant referees: Nistor Ioana, Mihoc Alina

7 March 2021	FCM Târgoviște (3)	0–19	Dunărea 2020 Giurgiu (3)	Şotânga
15:00 EST (UTC+2)		Report (FRF)		Stadium: Alpan; Attendance: Ene Andreea; Referee: Ivanov Roxana, Sirghi Raluca

7 March 2021	Zimbrul Tulcea (3)	1–7	Activ Slobozia (3)	Topolog
15:00 EST (UTC+2)		Report (FRF)		Stadium: Comunal; Attendance: Ioniță Eduard; Referee: Ionus Erchian, Vişan Florian Alexandru

7 March 2021	Colţea 1920 Braşov (3)	8–0	CSM Pașcani (3)	Tărlungeni
15:00 EST (UTC+2)		Report (FRF)		Stadium: Unirea; Referee: Dicu Madalin; Assistant referees: Florea Bianca, Crăciun Mădălina

17 March 2021	Academia de Fotbal şi Tenis Măgura (3)	6–2	Măgura 2012 Bacău (3)	Cisnădie
15:00 EST (UTC+2)		Report (FRF)		Stadium: Textila; Referee: Demetrescu Iuliana Elena; Assistant referees: Schiopet Claudiu, Boncz Gabriel

== Second Round/ Round of 32 ==
The 5 teams that advanced from the first round will be joined by the remaining teams: 15 Liga II teams and 12 Liga I teams, for a total of 32 teams playing 16 matches. 14 matches were played on 24 March, one of which was subsequently awarded, while two were not played.

24 March 2021	United Bihor (2)	0–12	Independența Baia Mare (1)	Tileagd
15:00 EST (UTC+2)		Report (FRF)		Stadium: Foresta; Referee: Klein Andreea; Assistant referees: Irina Petru Eusebiu, Bazso Magyar Tamas

24 March 2021	Viitorul Arad (3)	0–7	Piroș Security Arad (1)	Livada, Arad
15:00 EST (UTC+2)		Report (FRF)		Stadium: Baza Sportivă Livada; Referee: Gornic Alexandru Dan; Assistant referees: Mihoc Alina, Pîslaru Andrei

24 March 2021	Politehnica Timişoara (2)	0–9	Fortuna Becicherecu Mic (1)	Timișoara
15:00 EST (UTC+2)		Report (FRF)		Stadium: Stadionul Știința; Referee: Roman George Catalin; Assistant referees: Gherman Alexandru, Talpoș Marius

24 March 2021	Atletic Drobeta-Turnu-Severin (2)	1–3	Banat Girls Reșița (1)	Drobeta Turnu Severin
15:00 EST (UTC+2)		Report (FRF)		Stadium: Termo; Referee: Peşu Ionela Alina; Assistant referees: Constantinescu Daniela, Anghel Laurentiu

24 March 2021	Luceafărul Filiași (2)	0–3 (awd.)	Universitatea Alexandria (1)	Ișalnița
15:00 EST (UTC+2)		Report (FRF)		Stadium: Comunal

24 March 2021	Dunărea 2020 Giurgiu (3)	0–20	Fair Play București (1)	Giurgiu
15:00 EST (UTC+2)		Report (FRF)		Stadium: Stadionul Dunărea Port; Referee: Porumbel Valentin; Assistant referees: Neagu Gabriel, Făinaru Victor

24 March 2021	Dream Team București (2)	2–7	Carmen București (1)	București
15:00 EST (UTC+2)		Report (FRF)		Stadium: Ion Ţiriac; Referee: Terteleac Ana Maria; Assistant referees: Ivanov Roxana, Sirghi Raluca

24 March 2021	Activ Slobozia (3)	0–3 (awd.)	Selena ȘN Constanța (1)	Slobozia
15:00 EST (UTC+2)		orig. 0–1; Report (FRF)		Stadium: Stadionul Abatorul; Referee: Pîrlog Tudorel; Assistant referees: Ichim Cristi Daniel, Mocanu Robert

24 March 2021	Onix Râmnicu Sărat (2)	2–8	Universitatea Galați (1)	Râmnicu Sărat
15:00 EST (UTC+2)		Report (FRF)		Stadium: Onix; Referee: Safta Mihai; Assistant referees: Ciocoiu Bogdan, Ionica Alin

24 March 2021	Măgura 2012 Bacău (2)	0–7	Vulpițele Galbene Roman (2)	Bacău
15:00 EST (UTC+2)		Report (FRF)		Stadium: Lucrețiu Avram; Referee: Popa Silviu Gabriel; Assistant referees: Vițelaru Cosmin, Antal Damia

24 March 2021	Navobi Iași (2)	0–1	Nicu Gane Fălticeni (2)	Iași
15:00 EST (UTC+2)		Report (FRF)		Stadium: Emil Alexandrescu, sintetic Referee: Băltuță Vasile Dorin; Assistant referees: Grigoriu Nicoleta, Caba Bogdan Vasile

24 March 2021	Ladies Târgu Mureş (2)	0–8	Heniu Prundu Bârgăului (1)	Miercurea Nirajului
15:00 EST (UTC+2)		Report (FRF)		Stadium: Comunal; Referee: Feleki Gellert; Assistant referees: Tamasi Zoltan, Cozma Alexandru

24 March 2021	Csiksereda Miercurea Ciuc (2)	0–4	Vasas Femina Odorhei (1)	Miercurea Ciuc
15:00 EST (UTC+2)		Report (FRF)		Stadium: Central, sintetic Referee: Ștef Claudiu; Assistant referees: Gaspar Vladut, Cherteș Cristian Marius

24 March 2021	Colţea 1920 Braşov (3)	3–0 (awd.)	CSȘ Târgoviște (2)	Tărlungeni
15:00 EST (UTC+2)		Report (FRF)		Stadium: Unirea; Referee: Recorean Roxana; Assistant referees: Nagy Daniel, Tunsoiu Marian

24 March 2021	Academia de Fotbal şi Tenis Măgura (3)	8–2	CSM Târgu Mureș (2)	Cisnădie
15:00 EST (UTC+2)		Report (FRF)		Stadium: Măgura 2, Sintetic; Referee: Ciorbea Robert; Assistant referees: Guran Mircea, Pavel Cojocaru Andrei

24 March 2021	Olimpic Star Cluj (2)	0–14	U Olimpia Cluj (1)	Iclod
15:30 EST (UTC+2)		Report (FRF)		Stadium: Iclod Arena; Referee: Bodocan Narcis; Assistant referees: Revnic Alin, Meres Robert

== Second Round/ Round of 16 ==
The 16 qualified teams played the 8 matches on April 28.

28 April 2021	Banat Girls Reșița (1)	2–5	Universitatea Alexandria (1)	Lupac
11:00 EEST (UTC+3)		Report (FRF)		Stadium: Voința; Referee: Gaitin Claudiu; Assistant referees: Gherman Alexandru, Sandu Patrik-Stefan

28 April 2021	Carmen București (1)	2–1	Fair Play București (1)	București
16:30 EEST (UTC+3)		Report (FRF)		Stadium: Progresul Spartac; Referee: Trandafir Cristina Mariana; Assistant referees: Țepușă Mihaela, Ivanov Roxana

28 April 2021	Selena ȘN Constanța (1)	3–1	Universitatea Galați (1)	Constanța
16:30 EEST (UTC+3)		Report (FRF)		Stadium: SNC; Referee: Porumbel Valentin; Assistant referees: Neagu Gabriel, Dobre Vasilicā Viorel

28 April 2021	Piroș Security Arad (1)	4–3 (a.e.t.)	Fortuna Becicherecu Mic (1)	Arad
16:30 EEST (UTC+3)		3–3 reg. Report (FRF)		Stadium: Sânnicolaul Mic; Referee: Pal Adrian; Assistant referees: Bogdanel Alexandru, Urs George

28 April 2021	Fotbal Feminin Baia Mare (1)	0–3	Heniu Prundu Bârgăului (1)	Baia Mare
16:30 EEST (UTC+3)		Report (FRF)		Stadium: Viorel Mateianu; Referee: Popa Adina Claudia; Assistant referees: Toth Krisztian, Muresan Cristian Gheorghe

28 April 2021	Academia de Fotbal şi Tenis Măgura (3)	1–18	U Olimpia Cluj (1)	Cisnădie
16:30 EEST (UTC+3)		Report (FRF)		Stadium: Măgura; Referee: Fodor Andrei Gabriel; Assistant referees: Bumb Cristian, Doarvoas Claudiu

28 April 2021	Nicu Gane Fălticeni (2)	0–9	Vulpițele Galbene Roman (2)	Preuteşti
16:30 EEST (UTC+3)		Report (FRF)		Stadium: Comunal; Referee: Mihuleac Gabriel; Assistant referees: Hriscu Daniel, Hriscu Vlad

28 April 2021	Colţea 1920 Braşov (3)	0–15	Vasas Femina Odorhei (1)	Tărlungeni
16:30 EEST (UTC+3)		Report (FRF)		Stadium: Unirea (sintetic); Referee: Florescu Valentin; Assistant referees: Bedohazi Gergely, Biro Zsolt

== Quarterfinals ==
The 8 qualified teams played the 4 matches on May 12.

12 May 2021	Universitatea Alexandria (1)	0–5	U Olimpia Cluj (1)	Buzescu
11:00 EEST (UTC+3)		Report (FRF)		Stadium: Comunal; Referee: Gherghi Madalina; Assistant referees: Florea Bianca, Crăciun Mădălina

12 May 2021	Vulpițele Galbene Roman (2)	4–1	Carmen București (1)	Roman
17:30 EEST (UTC+3)		Report (FRF)		Stadium: Moldova; Referee: Mavriche Sergiu; Assistant referees: Dută George Bogdan, Antal Damian

12 May 2021	Selena ȘN Constanța (1)	1–3 (a.e.t.)	Piroș Security Arad (1)	Constanța
17:30 EEST (UTC+3)		1–1 reg. Report (FRF)		Stadium: SNC; Referee: Constantinescu Ionut; Assistant referees: Gîță Daniel Marius, Toma Andrei

12 May 2021	Heniu Prundu Bârgăului (1)	5–3 (a.e.t.)	Vasas Femina Odorhei (1)	Prundu Bârgăului
17:30 EEST (UTC+3)		3–3 reg. Report (FRF)		Stadium: Heniu; Referee: Kemenes Norbert; Assistant referees: Soponar Răzvan Ionut, Muresan Cristian Gheorghe

== Semifinals ==
The 4 qualified teams played the two matches on June 2.

2 June 2021	Piroș Security Arad (1)	0–3	U Olimpia Cluj (1)	Arad
17:30 EEST (UTC+3)				Stadium: Sânnicolaul Mic; Referee: Vidican Rares George; Assistant referees: Timar Ovidiu, Lakatos Rares

2 June 2021	Heniu Prundu Bârgăului (1)	8–0	Vulpițele Galbene Roman (2)	Roman
17:30 EEST (UTC+3)		Report (FRF)		Stadium: Moldova; Referee: Ștef Claudiu; Assistant referees: Cozma Alexandru, Moldovan Radu Petrisor

== Final ==
6 June 2021	Heniu Prundu Bârgăului (1)	0–1 (a.e.t.)	U Olimpia Cluj (1)	Arad
12:30 EEST (UTC+3)		Report (FRF)		Stadium: Francisc von Neuman; Referee: Terteleac Ana Maria; Assistant referees: Iugulescu Petruţa, Țepușă Mihaela, Popa Adina Claudia

Cupa României 2020–21 winners

7th title
