= 2016–17 Cupa României (women's football) =

The 2016–17 Romanian Women's Cup was the 14th edition of Romania's national cup in women's football. Olimpia Cluj won its sixth title through a 5–0 victory over Navobi Iaşi, which qualified for the final for the first time.

== Results ==
2nd preliminary round
Olimpic Star Cluj	2
Olimpia Cluj II	1
Piros Security	2
Juniorul Satu Mare	6
Vasas Odorhei II	6
Armonia Dolheşti	2
Banat Girls	1
Fortuna Becicherecu M.	4
Atletic Onix	0
Măgura Bacău	1
Universitatea Alexandr.	4
Selena Constanţa	1

Round of 16
Olimpic Star Cluj	0
Olimpia Cluj	7
Juniorul Satu Mare	2
Independenţa Baia M.	3
Vasas Odorhei II	1
ASA Târgu Mureş	0
Heniu Prundu B.	2
Vasas Odorhei	0
Fortuna Becicherecu Mic	3
CFR Timişoara	4
Măgura Bacău	1
Navobi Iaşi	9
Universitatea Alexandr.	7
Real Craiova	6
Fairplay București	3
CSS Târgovişte	4

Quarterfinals
Olimpia Cluj	18
Independenţa Baia Mare	0
Vasas Odorhei II	2
Heniu Prundu B.	4
CFR Timişoara	1
Navobi Iaşi	2
Universitatea Alexandria	0
CSS Târgovişte	3

Semifinals
Olimpia Cluj	6
Heniu Prundu Bârgăului	0
Navobi Iaşi	4
CSS Târgovişte	0

Final
Olimpia Cluj	5
Navobi Iaşi	0

=== Semifinals ===
26 April 2017	Olimpia Cluj	6–0	Heniu Prundu Bârgăului	Victoria Someșeni Stadium, Cluj-Napoca
16:00	Bâtea 8', 10'; Vătafu 24' (pen.); Carp 29', 34'; Voicu 69'	Report		Referee: Szekely; Assistant referees: Lucaci; Soponar

5 May 2017	Navobi Iaşi	4–0	CSS Târgovişte	Emil Alexandrescu Stadium, Iași
13:00	Deca 10'; Colesnicenco 42'; Vasile 72'; Rognean 86'	Report		Referee: Diaconu; Assistant referees: Cosma; Roman

=== Final game ===
14 May 2017	Navobi Iaşi	0–5	Olimpia Cluj	Emil Alexandrescu Stadium, Iași
17:00		Report	Vătafu 5'; Carp 12'; Voicu 31'; Giurgiu 49'; Bâtea 85'	Referee: Trandafir; Assistant referees: Șamșudean; Nan; Fourth official: Pușcașu
