= Politehnica Timișoara =

Politehnica Timișoara or Poli Timișoara may refer to:

- Politehnica University of Timișoara, a Romanian technical university from Timișoara
- FC Politehnica Timișoara, a Romanian professional football club from Timișoara, founded in 1921 and dissolved in 2012
- SSU Politehnica Timișoara, a Romanian professional football club from Timișoara which competes in Liga II
- ACS Poli Timișoara, a Romanian professional football club from Timișoara, founded in 2012 and dissolved in 2021
- ASU Politehnica Timișoara (women), a Romanian women's football club from Timișoara, which competes in Liga II
- SCM Politehnica Timișoara, a Romanian professional handball club from Timișoara, which competes in Liga Națională
