= Câmpean =

Câmpean is a Romanian surname. Notable people with the surname include:

- Norica Câmpean (born 1972), Romanian race walker
- Sara Câmpean (born 2003), Romanian footballer
