= Țurcaș =

Țurcaș is a Romanian surname. Notable people with the surname include:

- Mihai Țurcaș (1942–2002), Romanian sprint canoeist
- Petru Țurcaș (born 1976), Romanian footballer
