= Liga II (women's football) =

- Founded: 1990 as Divizia B 2013 as Liga I 2017 as Liga II
- Country: Romania
- Confederation: UEFA
- Divisions: 2
- Number of clubs: 16
- Level on pyramid: 2
- Promotion to: Liga I
- Relegation to: Liga III
- Domestic cup: Romanian Women's Cup
- Current champions: Vasas Femina FC and Olimpia Gherla (2023-24)
- Website: frfotbal.ro
- Current: 2024–25 Liga II

Liga II is the second level women's football league in Romania. A second tier women's football competition was first created in 1990 under the name Divizia B. After the fall of communism, organised women's football started to take off, and the founded clubs were distributed into 2 leagues - Divizia A with 12 teams and Divizia B with 30 teams grouped into 3 series, following a tournament called Cupa Libertății. Some time after, the number women's clubs declined, and the division was disbanded.

The second-level league was reintroduced starting with the 2013–14 season, when it formally received the name Liga I, following the introduction of Superliga as the top-tier league. However, as of the 2017–18 season, it was rebranded as Liga II, since the Superliga brand was quietly dropped altogether.

== Format ==
Since its reintroduction in 2013, Liga II has had two parallel regional divisions (series). Second teams of clubs in the top league cannot promote.

The 2020-21 season has had three parallel regional divisions (groups) with the group's winner teams (CSS Târgoviște, Ladies Târgu Mureș, Dream Team Bucharest) qualifying for promotional play-off as well as the best second team (ACS United Bihor). The matches in the play-off for promotion to the Women's League 1 will be played in a single round, resulting in three games for each team, the first two ranked will be promoted to Liga 1 Feminin.

== Winners ==
The following is a list of all Romanian women's second-tier football league winners since its reintroduction in 2013. The first place is declared the champion of the series, promotes to Liga I, and is presented with a trophy. The top three teams currently also receive gold, silver and bronze medals from the Romanian Football Federation. Promoted teams are denoted in italics.

Ed.	Season	Series	Champions	Runner-up	Third place	No.	Teams	System
1	2013–14 Liga I	Seria Nord	Heniu Prundu Bârgăului	Vasas Femina Odorhei	Armonia Dolhești	7	14	2 series with 7 teams each- playing a double round robin.
1	2013–14 Liga I	Seria Sud	Universitatea Alexandria	Viitorul Buzău	Oțelul Galați	7	14	2 series with 7 teams each- playing a double round robin.
2	2014–15 Liga I	Seria I	Olimpia 2 Cluj	Vasas Femina Odorhei	Independența Baia Mare	8	16	2 series with 8 teams each- playing a double round robin.
2	2014–15 Liga I	Seria II	Năvobi Iași	CSȘ Târgoviște	Selena Constanța	8	16	2 series with 8 teams each- playing a double round robin.
3	2015–16 Liga I	Seria I	CSȘ Târgoviște	Viitorul Reghin	Armonia Dolhești	10	21	2 series with 10/11 teams each- playing a double round robin.
3	2015–16 Liga I	Seria II	CFR Timișoara	Olimpia 2 Cluj	Real 2 Craiova	11	21	2 series with 10/11 teams each- playing a double round robin.
4	2016–17 Liga I	Seria I	Universitatea Alexandria	Viitorul Reghin	Selena Constanța	8	16	2 series with 8 teams each- playing a double round robin.
4	2016–17 Liga I	Seria II	Olimpia 2 Cluj	Fortuna Becicherecu Mic	Vasas 2 Femina Odorhei	8	16	2 series with 8 teams each- playing a double round robin.
5	2017–18 Liga II	Seria I	Universitatea Galați	Selena Constanța	Onix Râmnicu Sărat	8	16	2 series with 8 teams each- playing a double round robin.
5	2017–18 Liga II	Seria II	Independența Baia Mare	Vasas 2 Femina Odorhei	Olimpia 2 Cluj	8	16	2 series with 8 teams each- playing a double round robin.
6	2018–19 Liga II	Seria I	Selena Constanța	Vulpițele Galbene Roman	Vasas 2 Femina Odorhei	8	16	2 series with 8 teams each- playing a double round robin, plus an additional double-legged promotion play-off between second-placed promotable teams.
6	2018–19 Liga II	Seria II	Piroș Security Arad	U Olimpia Cluj 2	Luceafărul Filiași	8	16	2 series with 8 teams each- playing a double round robin, plus an additional double-legged promotion play-off between second-placed promotable teams.
7	2019–20 Liga II	Seria I	Carmen București	Vulpițele Galbene Roman	Vasas 2 Femina Odorhei	7	14	2 series with 7 teams each- playing a double round robin planned, but only single round-robin completed due to the 2019-20 coronavirus pandemic.
7	2019–20 Liga II	Seria II	Banat Girls Reșița	U Olimpia Cluj 2	Olimpic Star Cluj	7	14	2 series with 7 teams each- playing a double round robin planned, but only single round-robin completed due to the 2019-20 coronavirus pandemic.
8	2020–21 Liga II	Seria I	CSS Târgoviște	Vulpițele Galbene Roman	Vasas 2 Femina Odorhei	5	17	2 series with 5 teams each- playing a triple round robin and one series with 7 teams playing a double round robin. The top promotable team in each of the first two series, along with the first two places in the third series played an additional single round robin promotion play-off, with the top two teams promoting.
8	2020–21 Liga II	Seria II	Ladies Târgu Mureș	Csikszereda Miercurea Ciuc	U Olimpia Cluj 2	5	17	2 series with 5 teams each- playing a triple round robin and one series with 7 teams playing a double round robin. The top promotable team in each of the first two series, along with the first two places in the third series played an additional single round robin promotion play-off, with the top two teams promoting.
8	2020–21 Liga II	Seria III	Dream Team București	United Bihor	CSM Târgu Mureș	7	17	2 series with 5 teams each- playing a triple round robin and one series with 7 teams playing a double round robin. The top promotable team in each of the first two series, along with the first two places in the third series played an additional single round robin promotion play-off, with the top two teams promoting.
9	2021–22	Seria I	Csiksereda	ACS Vulpițele Galbene Roman	Navobi Iasi	8	17	2 series with 8 (Seria I) and 9 (Seria II) teams respectively - playing home-away. The champion of each series advances to the Romanian Liga I.
9	2021–22	Seria II	U Olimpia Cluj 2	CS Carmen București 1937	ACS Dream Team	9	17	2 series with 8 (Seria I) and 9 (Seria II) teams respectively - playing home-away. The champion of each series advances to the Romanian Liga I.
10	2022–23	Seria I	Farul Constanța	ACS Liceenii Topolog	ACS Vulpițele Galbene Roman	9	19	2 series with 9 (Seria I) and 10 (Seria II) teams respectively - playing home-away. The champion of each series advances to the Romanian Liga I.
10	2022–23	Seria II	Gloria Bistrița-Năsăud	U Olimpia Cluj 2	Olimpia Gherla	10	19	2 series with 9 (Seria I) and 10 (Seria II) teams respectively - playing home-away. The champion of each series advances to the Romanian Liga I.
11	2023–24	Seria I	Vasas Femina FC	ACS Vulpițele Galbene Roman	Oțelul Galați	10	19	2 series with 10 (Seria I) and 9 (Seria II) teams respectively - playing home-away. The champion of each series advances to the Romanian Liga I.
11	2023–24	Seria II	Olimpia Gherla	Politehnica Timișoara 2	FC Hermannstadt	9	19	2 series with 10 (Seria I) and 9 (Seria II) teams respectively - playing home-away. The champion of each series advances to the Romanian Liga I.
12	2024–25	Seria I				6	16	2 series with 6 (Seria I) and 10 (Seria II) teams respectively - playing home-away. The champion of each series advances to the Romanian Liga I.
12	2024–25	Seria II				10	16	2 series with 6 (Seria I) and 10 (Seria II) teams respectively - playing home-away. The champion of each series advances to the Romanian Liga I.
