= FC Carmen București (women's football) =

Romanian football club

- Full name: Fotbal Club Carmen București
- Short name: Carmen
- Founded: 2018
- Dissolved: 2023
- Ground: Marin Anastasovici Stadium
- Capacity: 8,500
- 2022–23: Liga I, 3rd
Home colours	Away colours

Fotbal Club Carmen București, commonly known as Carmen București or simply Carmen, was a Romanian women's football club based in Bucharest. The club was founded in 2018, and played for the first time in Liga I in the 2020–21 Liga I season, where they finished 11th.

The club won the Cupa României in the 2022–23 season beating FCU Olimpia Cluj 2–1 after extra time.

The club was dissolved in the summer of 2023.

== Honours ==
- Cupa României
  - Winners (1): 2022–23
- Liga II
  - Winners (1): 2019-20
  - Runners-up (1): 2021–22
- Liga III
  - Winners (1): 2018-19

== Season by season ==
Champions Runners-up Third place Promoted Relegated

Season		Division	Tier	Place	Cup	WCL
1	2018–19	Liga III	3	1st (C, P)	3R	–
2	2019–20	Liga II	2	1st (C, P)	3R	–
3	2020–21	Liga I	1	11th	QF	–
4	2021–22	Liga II	2	2nd (P)	3R	–
5	2022–23	Liga I	1	3rd	W	-
