= Petru Țurcaș =

Romanian footballer (born 1976)

Personal information
- Date of birth: 16 May 1976 (age 50)
- Place of birth: Timișoara, Romania
- Height: 1.82 m (6 ft 0 in)
- Position: Goalkeeper

Team information
- Current team: Politehnica Timișoara (W) (GK Coach)

Youth career
- Politehnica Timișoara

Senior career*
Years	Team	Apps	(Gls)
1993–1994	Politehnica Timișoara	1	(0)
1994	CFR Timișoara	6	(0)
1994–1997	Politehnica Timișoara	37	(0)
1998–2002	Gloria Bistrița	6	(0)
2002–2004	Unirea Alba Iulia	34	(0)
2005–2008	CFR Cluj	25	(0)
2008–2011	Gloria Bistrița	2	(0)
2011	ACS Recaș		
2012–2013	Millenium Giarmata		
Total		111	(0)

International career^{‡}
1992	Romania U16		
1993	Romania U18	4	(0)
1996	Romania U21	1	(0)
1996	Romania U23	2	(0)

Managerial career
- 2013–2014: ACS Poli Timișoara (GK Coach)
- 2016–2018: ACS Poli Timișoara (GK Coach)
- 2019–2021: Politehnica Timișoara (GK Coach)
- 2021–: Politehnica Timișoara (W) (GK Coach)
- * Club domestic league appearances and goals as of 9 September 2015 ‡ National team caps and goals as of 3 March 2010

Petru Țurcaș (born 16 May 1976, in Timișoara) is a retired Romanian footballer.

== Club career ==
Țurcaș was born on 16 May 1976 in Timișoara, Romania and began playing junior-level football at local club Politehnica. On 6 April 1994 he made his Divizia A debut when coach Emerich Dembrovschi sent him at halftime to replace Ioan Almășan in Politehnica's 6–3 away loss to Oțelul Galați. The team was relegated to Divizia B at the end of his first season. Subsequently, he went for the first half of the 1994–95 Divizia B season at CFR Timișoara, and then returned to Politehnica which he helped gain promotion back to the first division. The White-Purples were relegated once again at the end of the 1996–97 season. He joined Gloria Bistrița where he stayed about three years, playing rarely. In 2002, Țurcaș switched teams again, going at second league side Unirea Alba Iulia, which he helped earn promotion to the first league at the end of the 2002–03 season.

In the middle of the 2004–05 season, Țurcaș left Alba Iulia to join CFR Cluj. Under coach Dorinel Munteanu, he played nine games in the 2005 Intertoto Cup campaign as CFR got past Vėtra, Athletic Bilbao, Saint-Étienne and Žalgiris, reaching the final where they were defeated 4–2 on aggregate by Lens. In 2008 he returned to Gloria Bistrița where on 22 May 2010 he made his last Divizia A appearance in a 2–1 away loss to Rapid București, totaling 70 matches in the competition. Țurcaș ended his career in 2013 after spending the last years of his career at ACS Recaș and Millenium Giarmata in the third league.

== International career ==
Țurcaș played for Romania's under-16 national team in the 1992 European Under-16 Championship under the guidance of coach Marcel Pigulea.

Between 1993 and 1996 he made several appearances for Romania's under-18, under-21 and under-23 squads.

== Honours ==
Politehnica Timișoara

- Divizia B: 1994–95

Unirea Alba Iulia

- Divizia B: 2002–03

CFR Cluj

- Intertoto Cup runner-up: 2005
