= Adina Rognean =

Romanian footballer (born 1994)

Adina-Gina Rognean
Personal information
- Date of birth: 28 May 1994 (age 32)
- Position: Forward

Team information
- Current team: CS Gloria 2018 Bistrița-Năsăud

International career^{‡}
| Years | Team | Apps | (Gls) |
- Romania
- ‡ National team caps and goals as of 19:47, 30 August 2019 (UTC)

Adina-Gina Rognean (born 28 May 1994) is a Romanian footballer who plays as a forward and has appeared for the Romania women's national team.

== Career ==
Rognean has been capped for the Romania national team, appearing for the team during the 2019 FIFA Women's World Cup qualifying cycle.
