= ASU Politehnica Timișoara (women) =

Romanian football club

Politehnica Timișoara
- Full name: ASU Politehnica Timișoara
- Nicknames: Alb-violetele (The White-violets); Studentele (The Students)
- Short name: Poli
- Founded: 2019; 7 years ago
- Ground: Știința / Baza Poli 2
- Capacity: 1000 / 0
- Owner(s): Politehnica University of Timișoara; Druckeria
- Chairman: Alin Molcuț
- Manager: Alexandru Szabo
- League: Liga I
- 2021–22: Liga I, 6th
Home colours	Away colours	Third colours

ASU Politehnica Timișoara, commonly known as Politehnica Timișoara, Poli Timișoara or simply Poli, is a Romanian women's football club based in Timișoara, Timiș County, Romania. The team currently plays in the Liga II, second tier of the Romanian women's football system, after promoting at the end of the 2019–20 season.

== History ==
The team was created in 2019 by team manager Alin Molcuț and coach Alexandru Szabo, although women's football activities had existed since 2016, the girls being engaged in mini-football and futsal activities.

In its first season, it managed to promote to Liga II. The team finished first in a series of just four teams, when after five rounds, the COVID-19 pandemic brought an early end to the season. In the Romanian Cup, the team reached the Round of 32 (second round).

In its second season, after not playing any official matches in over a year (since November 2019), the team debuted in Liga II in March 2021. Despite aiming for a promotion to Liga I, the team only managed to obtain the fourth place in the Seria 3 of Liga II, coming short of the promotion play-offs. In the Romanian Cup, the team again reached the Round of 32 (second round).

In the summer of 2021, the already existing partnership between ACS Fortuna Becicherecu Mic and ASU Politehnica Timișoara (now SSU Politehnica Timișoara) was strengthened when Fortuna women's team announced that it will use the Politehnica Timișoara branding starting with the 2021–2022 season. As a result of this partnership, Fortuna, which played in the Liga I became known as "Politehnica Timișoara Femina", while SSU Politehnica Timișoara became the second team. However, while it kept its place in the 2021–22 Liga II, and was slated to play, it did not manage to field enough players and suspended its activity.

== Honours ==
=== Leagues ===
- Liga III
  - Winners (1): 2019–20

== Season by season ==
Champions Runners-up Third place Promoted Relegated

Season		Division	Tier	Place	Cup	WCL
1	2019–20	Liga III	3	1st	R32	–
2	2020–21	Liga II	2	4th	R32	–
3	2021–22	Liga II	2	9th	–	–
