= Livada, Arad =

Livada
- Commune
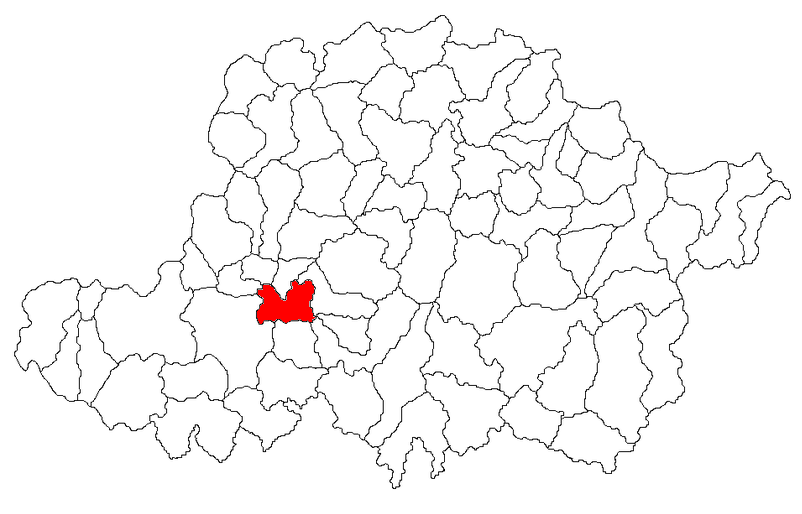
- Location in Arad County

- Location in Romania
- Coordinates: 46.2167°N 21.3833°E
- Country: Romania
- County: Arad
- Population (2021-12-01): 3,813
- Time zone: UTC+02:00 (EET)
  - Summer (DST): UTC+03:00 (EEST)
- Vehicle reg.: AR

Livada (Hungarian: Fakert) is a commune in Arad County, Romania. Livada commune is situated on the Arad Plateau, northward from Arad. The commune stretches over 2013 hectares and is composed of two villages, Livada (situated at 10 km from Arad) and Sânleani (Szentleányfalva).

== Population ==
According to the last census the population of the commune counts 2892 inhabitants, out of which 86,6% are Romanians, 11,3% Hungarians, 1,5% Germans and 0,6% are of other or undeclared nationalities.

== History ==
The first documentary record of Livada dates back to 1553, while Sânleani was first mentioned in 1302.

== Economy ==
Although the commune's economy is mainly agrarian, at present it can be characterized by a powerful dynamic force with significant developments in all the sectors present in the commune. Its closeness to the county capital has made possible the dynamism of services and the intensification of economic relations with the town.
