= Sara Câmpean =

Romanian footballer (born 2003)

Personal information
- Date of birth: 16 July 2003 (age 23)
- Place of birth: Romania,
- Position: Goalkeeper

Team information
- Current team: Olimpia Cluj
- Number: 12

International career^{‡}
Years	Team	Apps	(Gls)
2019–2020	Romania U17	4	(0)
2019–	Romania	1	(0)
- ‡ National team caps and goals as of 14:05, 31 January 2021 (UTC)

Sara Câmpean (born 16 July 2003) is a Romanian footballer who plays as a goalkeeper for Olimpia Cluj and the Romania women's national team.

== Career ==
She made her debut for the Romania national team on 4 April 2019 against Malta, playing the entire match in a 2–0 win for Romania.

== See also ==
- Sport in Romania
- Women in Sport
- Women's association football
