= Liga III (women's football) =

- Founded: 2016 as Liga II; 2017 as Liga III
- Country: Romania
- Confederation: UEFA
- Divisions: 2
- Number of clubs: 12
- Level on pyramid: 3
- Promotion to: Liga II
- Domestic cup: Romanian Women's Cup
- Website: frfotbal.ro
- Current: 2020–21 Liga III

Liga III is the third-level women's football league in Romania. It was created starting with the 2016–17 season, when it formally received the name Liga II, following the introduction of Superliga as the top-tier league, and the subsequent relegation of Liga I to second-tier. However, as of the 2017–18 season, it was rebranded as Liga III, since the Superliga brand was dropped altogether, and subsequently Liga I became the top league, and Liga II the second.

== Format ==
In its first season, it had only one series, in its second season two series, in its third season three series, and since its fourth season four series. In its fifth season, the number of series was reduced to only two.

== Winners ==
The following is a list of all Romanian women's third-tier football league winners. The first place is declared the champion of the series, is slated for promotion to Liga II, and is presented with a trophy. Second teams of clubs cannot be promoted if the first team of the club is in the next higher tier. The promoted teams in each series for every year are denoted in italics. Because it is the lowest level in the Romanian Football League, there is no formal relegation.

Ed.	Season	Series	Champions	Runner-up	Third place	No.	Teams	System
1	2016–17 Liga II		Piroș Security Arad	Atletic Onix Râmnicu Sărat	Banat Girls Reșița	8		Double round robin.
2	2017–18 Liga III	Seria I	Vulpițele Galbene Roman	Nicu Gane Fălticeni	Dream Team București	8	15	2 series with 8/7 teams each- playing a double round robin.
2	2017–18 Liga III	Seria II	Banat Girls Reșița	CFR 2 Timișoara	Independența 2 Baia Mare	7	15	2 series with 8/7 teams each- playing a double round robin.
3	2018–19 Liga III	Seria I	Carmen București	Atletic Drobeta	Dream Team București	6	18	3 series with 6 teams each- playing a double round robin.
3	2018–19 Liga III	Seria II	Nicu Gane Fălticeni	Universitatea 2 Galați	CSM Pașcani	6	18	3 series with 6 teams each- playing a double round robin.
3	2018–19 Liga III	Seria III	CSM Târgu Mureș	Independența 2 Baia Mare	Csiksereda Miercurea Ciuc	6	18	3 series with 6 teams each- playing a double round robin.
4	2019–20 Liga III	Seria I	Dream Team București	SCM Dunărea 2020 Giurgiu	Activ Slobozia	5	19	4 series with 5/4 teams each- playing a double round robin.
4	2019–20 Liga III	Seria II	ASU Politehnica Timişoara	Viitorul Arad	Luceafărul 2 Filiași	4	19	4 series with 5/4 teams each- playing a double round robin.
4	2019–20 Liga III	Seria III	Student Sport Alba Iulia	Colţea 1920 Braşov	Măgura Cisnădie	5	19	4 series with 5/4 teams each- playing a double round robin.
4	2019–20 Liga III	Seria IV	Măgura 2012 Bacău	Csiksereda Miercurea Ciuc	Universitatea 2 Galați	5	19	4 series with 5/4 teams each- playing a double round robin.
4	2020–21 Liga III	Seria I	Activ Slobozia	Colţea 1920 Braşov	Zimbrul Tulcea	6	12	2 series with 6 teams each- playing a double round robin.
4	2020–21 Liga III	Seria II	Atletic Olimpia Gherla	Academia de Fotbal şi Tenis Măgura Cisnădie	Viitorul Arad	6	12	2 series with 6 teams each- playing a double round robin.
