= Stadionul Comunal (Tărlungeni) =

Stadium in Tărlungeni, Romania

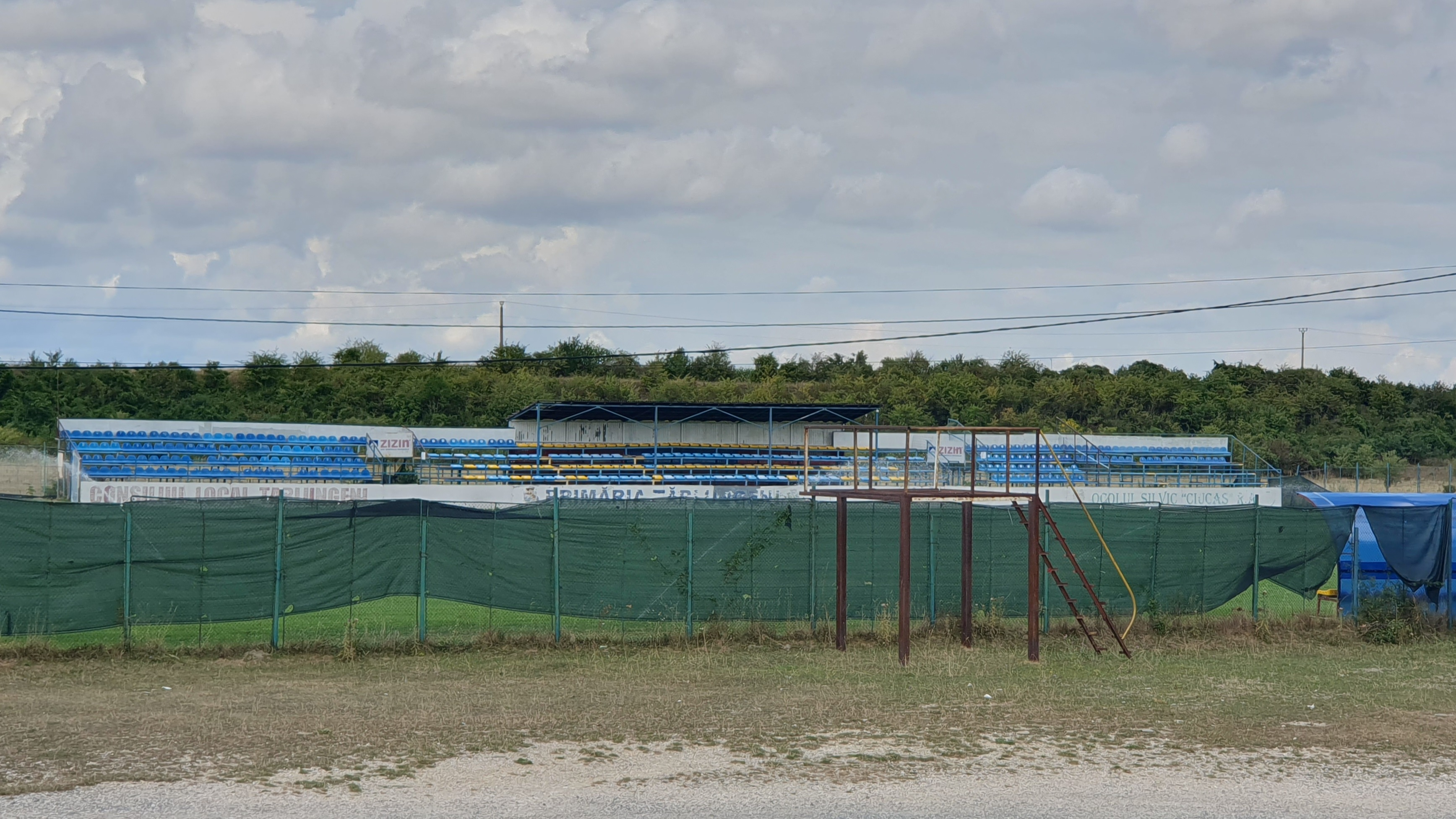
- Interactive map of Stadionul Comunal
- Former names: Stadionul Unirea (1983–2016)
- Location: Tărlungeni, Romania
- Coordinates: 45°38′35.5″N 25°45′0.7″E
- Owner: Commune of Tărlungeni
- Operator: Ciucaș Tărlungeni; Colțea Brașov
- Capacity: 1,000 seated
- Surface: Grass

Construction
- Opened: 1980
- Renovated: 2013

Tenants
- Ciucaș Tărlungeni (1983–present); Colțea Brașov (2016–present)

Stadionul Comunal is a multi-use stadium in Tărlungeni, Romania. It is used mostly for football matches and is the home ground of Ciucaș Tărlungeni and Colțea Brașov. The stadium holds 1,000 people.
