= FC Universitatea Galați =

Romanian football club

Universitatea Galați
- Full name: Fotbal Club Universitatea Galați
- Nicknames: Panterele Negre (The Black Panthers); Gălățencele (The Women from Galați)
- Short name: U Galați
- Founded: 2015; 11 years ago
- Ground: Siderurgistul
- Capacity: 6,000
- Chairman: Gabriel Călinescu
- Managers: Gabriel Călinescu; Alexandru Caracaș
- League: Liga II
- 2022–23: Liga I, 12th (relegated)
Home colours	Away colours

Fotbal Club Universitatea Galați, commonly known as Universitatea Galați, or simply U Galați, is a Romanian women's football club based in Galați, Galați County. The team was founded in 2015 and promoted to Liga I at the end of the 2017–18 season, as the winner of the first series of the Liga II.

Universitatea Galați plays its home matches on Siderurgistul Stadium with a capacity of 6,000 seats.

== Honours ==
=== Leagues ===
- Liga I
  - Runners-up (1): 2019–20
- Liga II
  - Winners (1): 2017–18

== Season by season ==
Champions Runners-up Third place Promoted Relegated

Season		Division	Tier	Place	Cup	WCL
1	2015–16	Liga I, Seria I	2	6th	2R	–
2	2016–17	Liga I, Seria I	2	5th	1R	–
3	2017–18	Liga II, Seria I	2	1st	R16	–
4	2018–19	Liga I	1	4th	SF	–
4	2019–20	Liga I	1	2nd	TBD	–

== Current squad ==
As of 19 January 2019

Note: Flags indicate national team as defined under FIFA eligibility rules; some limited exceptions apply. Players may hold more than one non-FIFA nationality.

No.	Pos.	Nation	Player
—	GK	ROU	Mirela Abălașei
—	GK	ROU	Larisa Pazargic
—	DF	ROU	Nina Anca
—	DF	MDA	Ana Arnautu
—	DF	MDA	Olga Cușinova
—	DF	ROU	Alexandra Ivan
—	DF	ROU	Elena Ivan
—	DF	ROU	Valentina Ivan
—	MF	ROU	Monica Bențoiu
—	MF	ROU	Roxana Ioan

No.	Pos.	Nation	Player
—	MF	ROU	Lidia Moacă
—	MF	ROU	Loredana Nica (Captain)
—	MF	ROU	Mădălina Răduc
—	MF	ROU	Elena Sfinteș
—	MF	MDA	Irina Topal
—	FW	ROU	Adelina Ion
—	FW	ROU	Nicoleta Lepădatu
—	FW	ROU	Andreea Surcică
—	MF	MDA	Iuliana Colnic

== Club officials ==
=== Board of directors ===
Role	Name
President	(Romania) Gabriel Călinescu
Vice-President	(Romania) Alexandru Caracaș

- Last updated: 19 January 2019

=== Current technical staff ===
Role	Name
Managers	(Romania) Gabriel Călinescu (Romania) Alexandru Caracaș

- Last updated: 19 January 2019
