= Stadionul Clujana =

Stadium in Cluj-Napoca, Romania

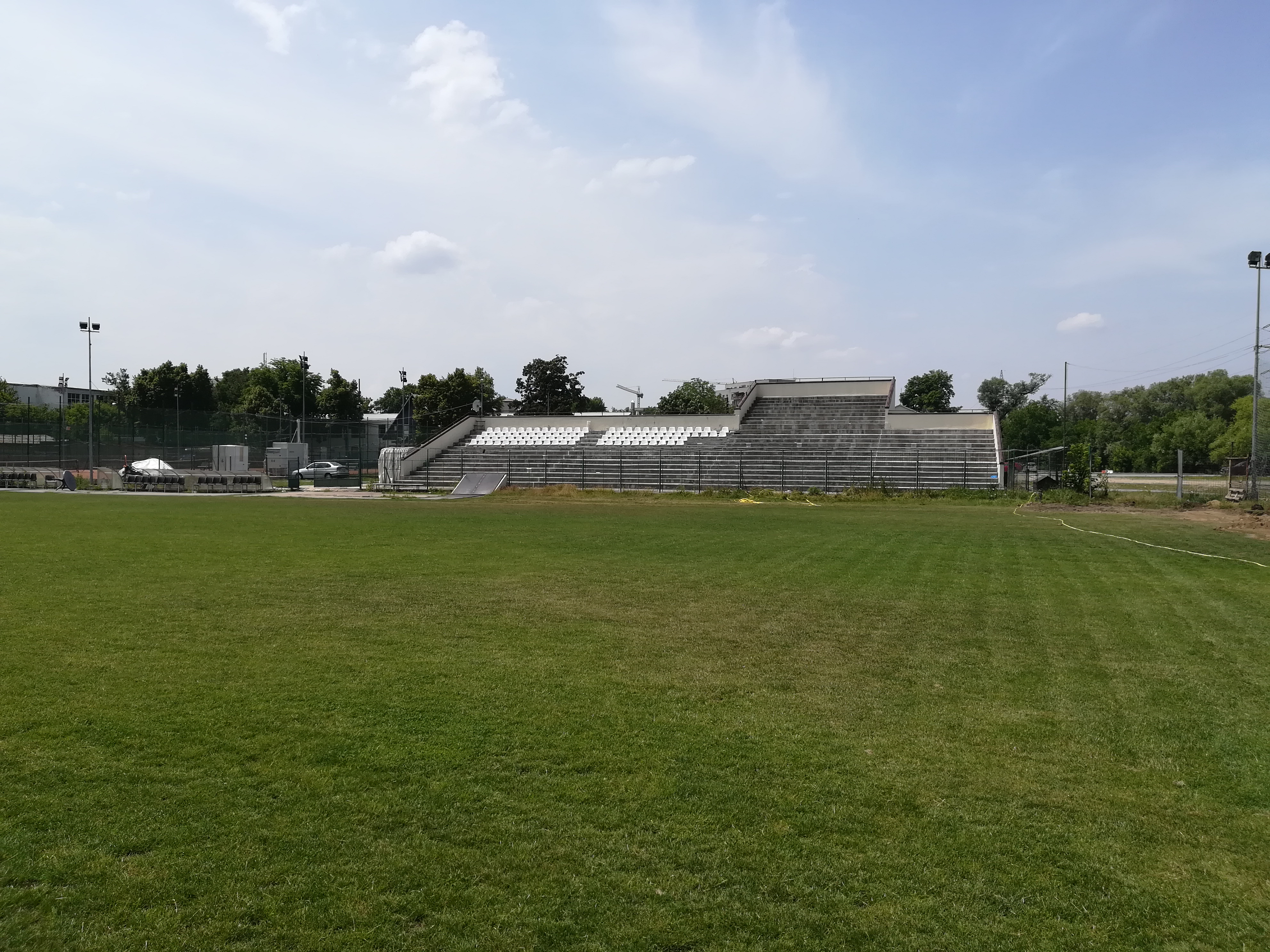
- Interactive map of Stadionul Clujana
- Address: Str. Tăbăcarilor, nr. 18
- Location: Cluj-Napoca, Romania
- Coordinates: 46°47′25.8″N 23°36′43.4″E
- Owner: Clujana Sports Association
- Operator: Sănătatea Cluj; Universitatea Cluj
- Capacity: 750 (500 seated)
- Surface: Grass

Construction
- Opened: 1936
- Renovated: 2009
- Expanded: 2009

Tenants
- Dermata Cluj (1937–1967); CFR Cluj (1967–1973); Universitatea Cluj (2009–2010); Sănătatea Cluj (1986–2010, 2015–2018, 2022–present)

Stadionul Clujana is a multi-use stadium in Cluj-Napoca. It is currently the home ground of Sănătatea Cluj and Universitatea Cluj youth academy. It currently holds 750 people. This was also the home ground of Dermata Cluj, CFR Cluj, and Sănătatea Cluj.

== Gallery ==
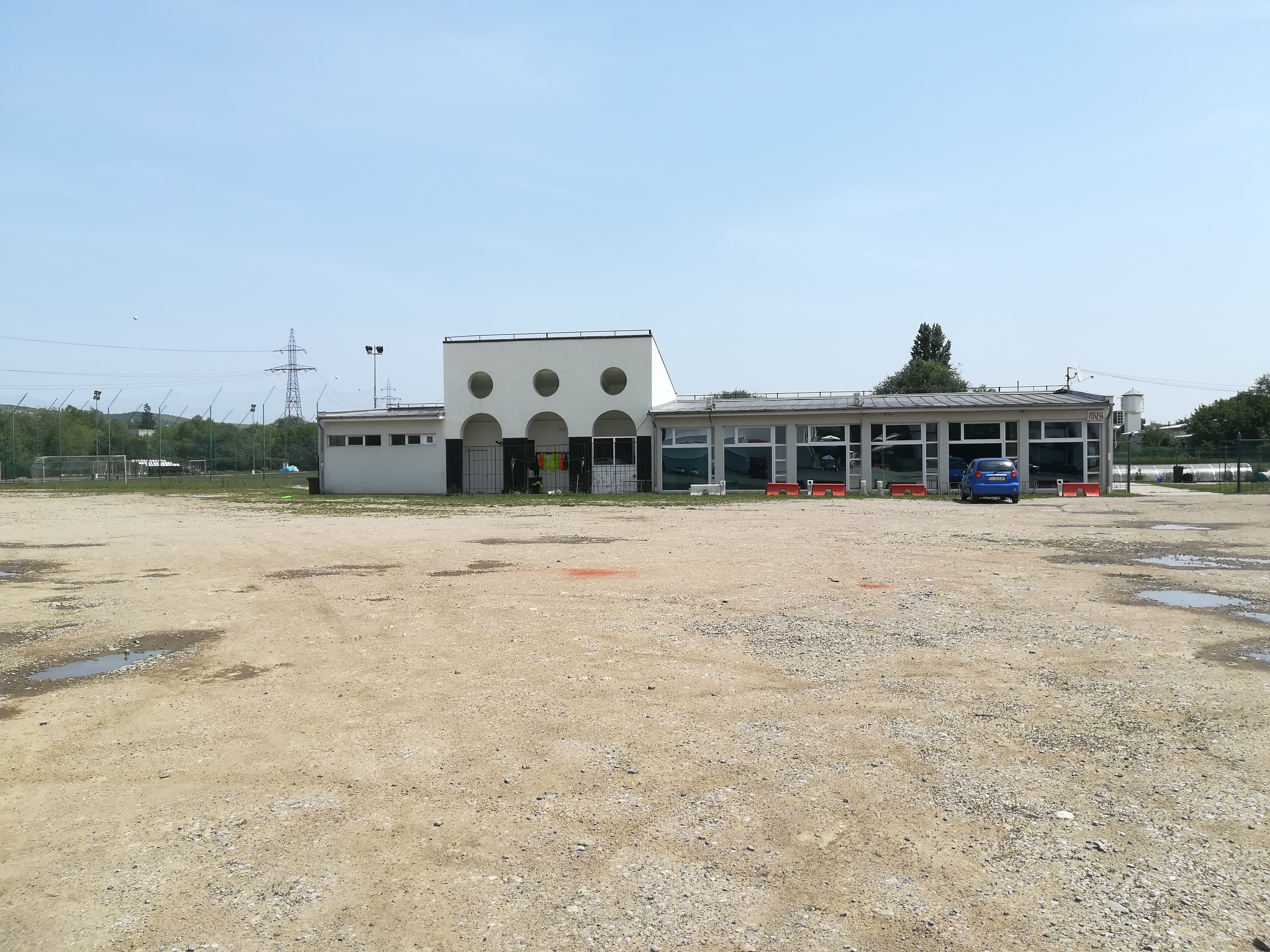
Exterior view of the stadium.

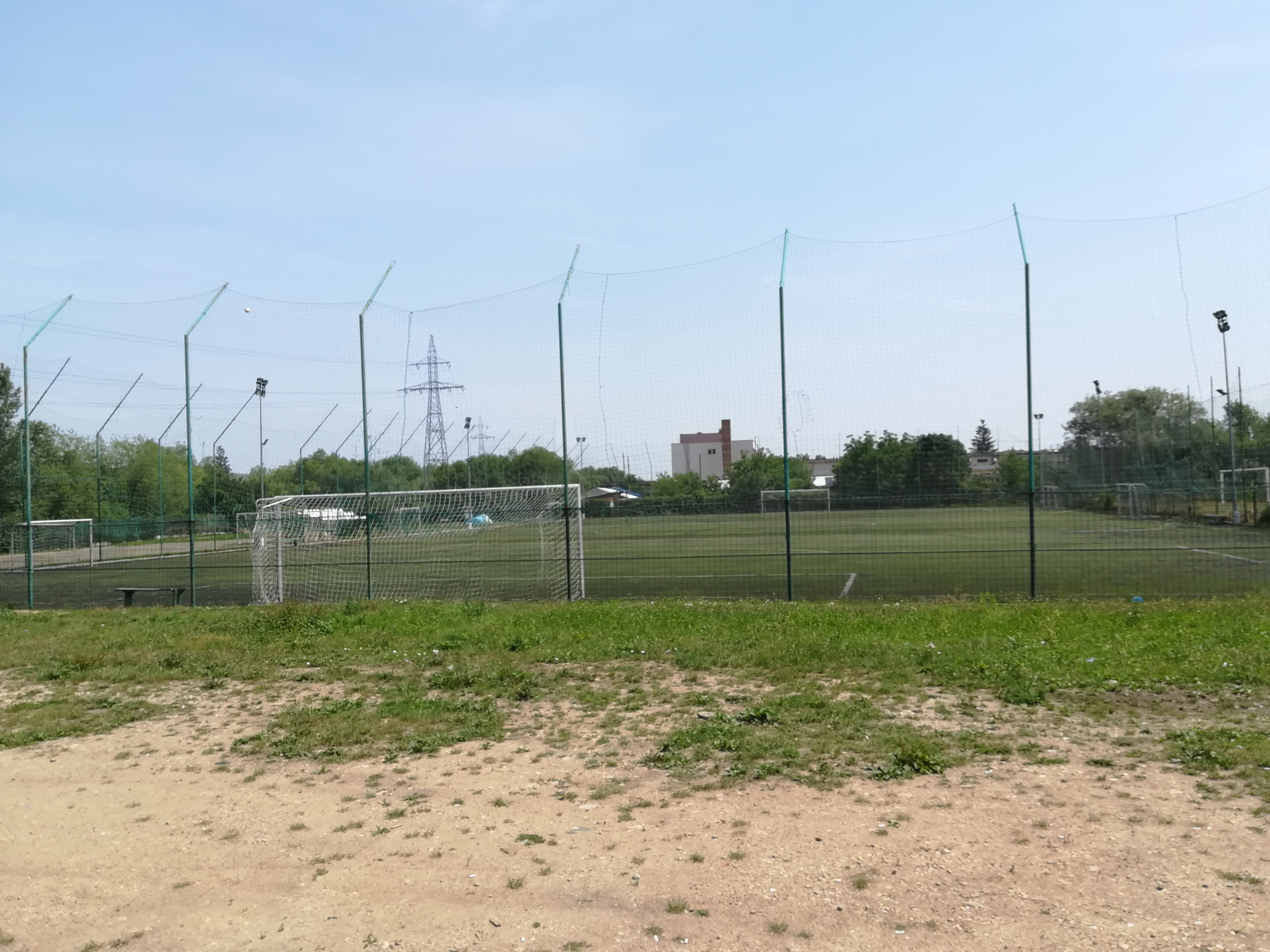
Artificial turf ground of the stadium.

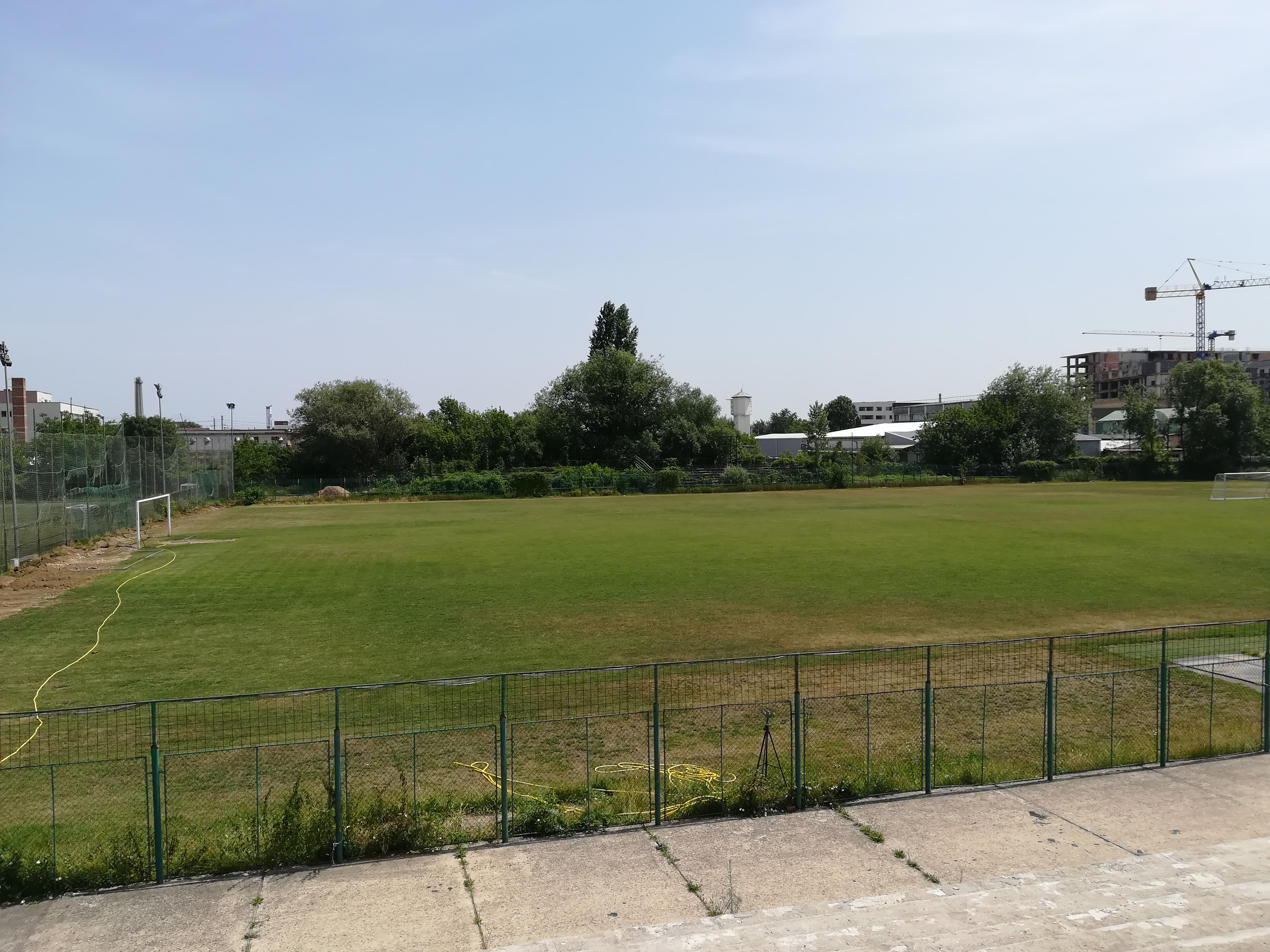
View of the stadium from the main stand.
