= Miercurea Ciuc Municipal Stadium =

Romanian stadium

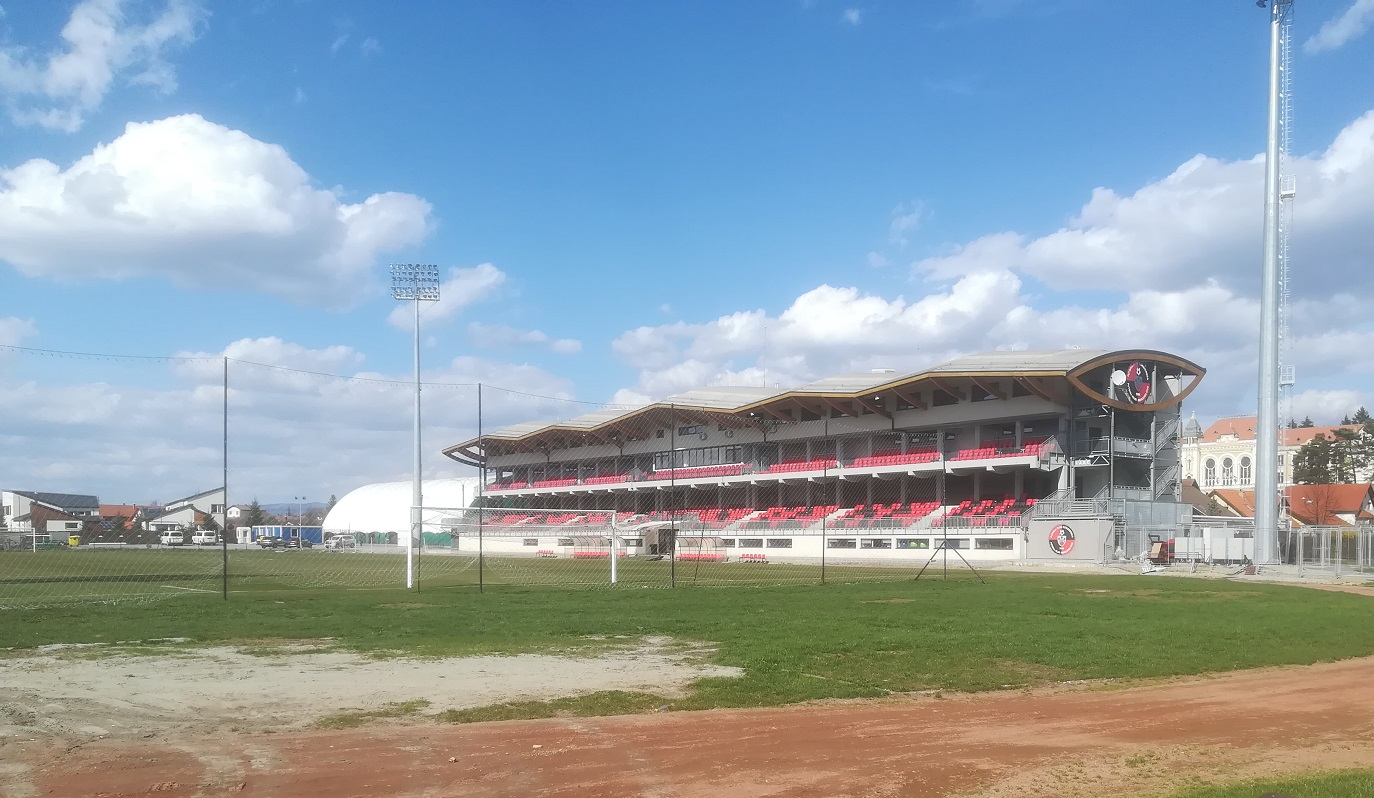
- Interactive map of Miercurea Ciuc Municipal Stadium
- Address: Str. Stadion, nr. 3
- Location: Miercurea Ciuc, Romania
- Coordinates: 46°22′1″N 25°48′10.5″E
- Owner: Municipality of Miercurea Ciuc
- Operator: Miercurea Ciuc
- Capacity: 2,480 (all seated)
- Surface: Grass

Construction
- Opened: 1904
- Renovated: 1960s, 1990s, 2016–2017
- Expanded: 2016–2017, 2021–2022

Tenant
- Miercurea Ciuc (1904–present)

The Miercurea Ciuc Municipal Stadium is a multi-use stadium in Miercurea Ciuc, Romania. It is used mostly for football matches and is the home ground of FK Miercurea Ciuc. The stadium holds 2,480 people.
