= Stadionul Moldova (Roman) =

Romanian stadium

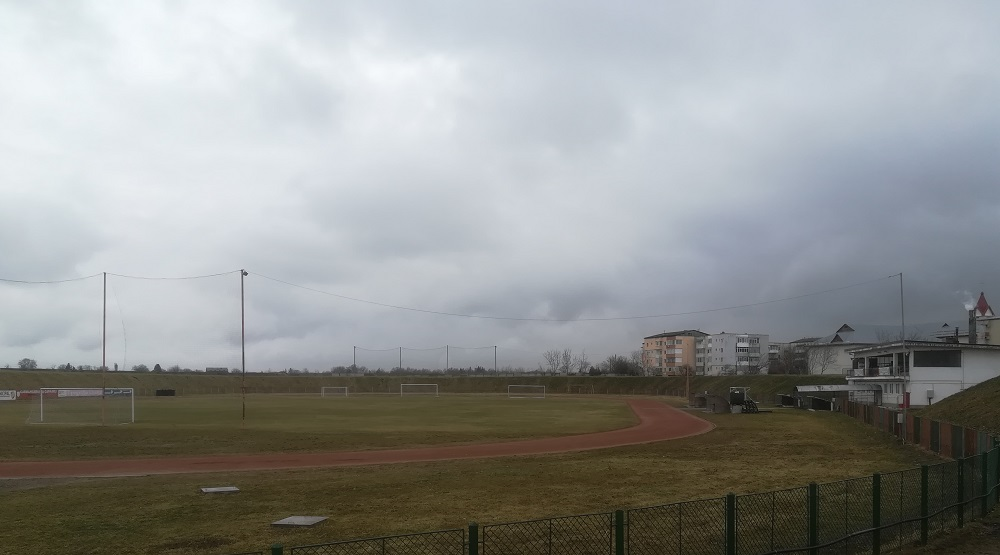
- Interactive map of Stadionul Moldova
- Address: Str. Victor Hugo, nr. 15
- Location: Roman, Romania
- Coordinates: 46°54′48″N 26°55′47″E
- Owner: Municipality of Roman
- Operator: CSM Roman
- Capacity: 100 seated
- Surface: Grass

Construction
- Opened: 1970s
- Renovated: 2020–2021

Tenant
- CSM Roman (1954–present)

Stadionul Moldova is a multi-use stadium in Roman. It is the home ground of CSM Roman and has a capacity of 100 seats. Moldova Stadium was re-organized in 2020, when almost the entire stadium (except the VIP zone) was demolished, as a result of the advanced degradation. The stands zone was sown with grass and trees were planted, now being under construction three smaller stands (two of 500 seats and one of 1,000 seats).

== Gallery ==
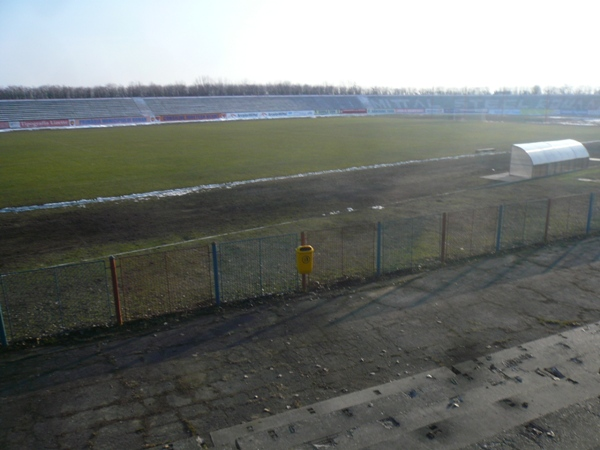
Stadium before capacity changes
