= Stadionul Victoria Someșeni =

Romanian stadium

- Baza Sportivă Ardealul
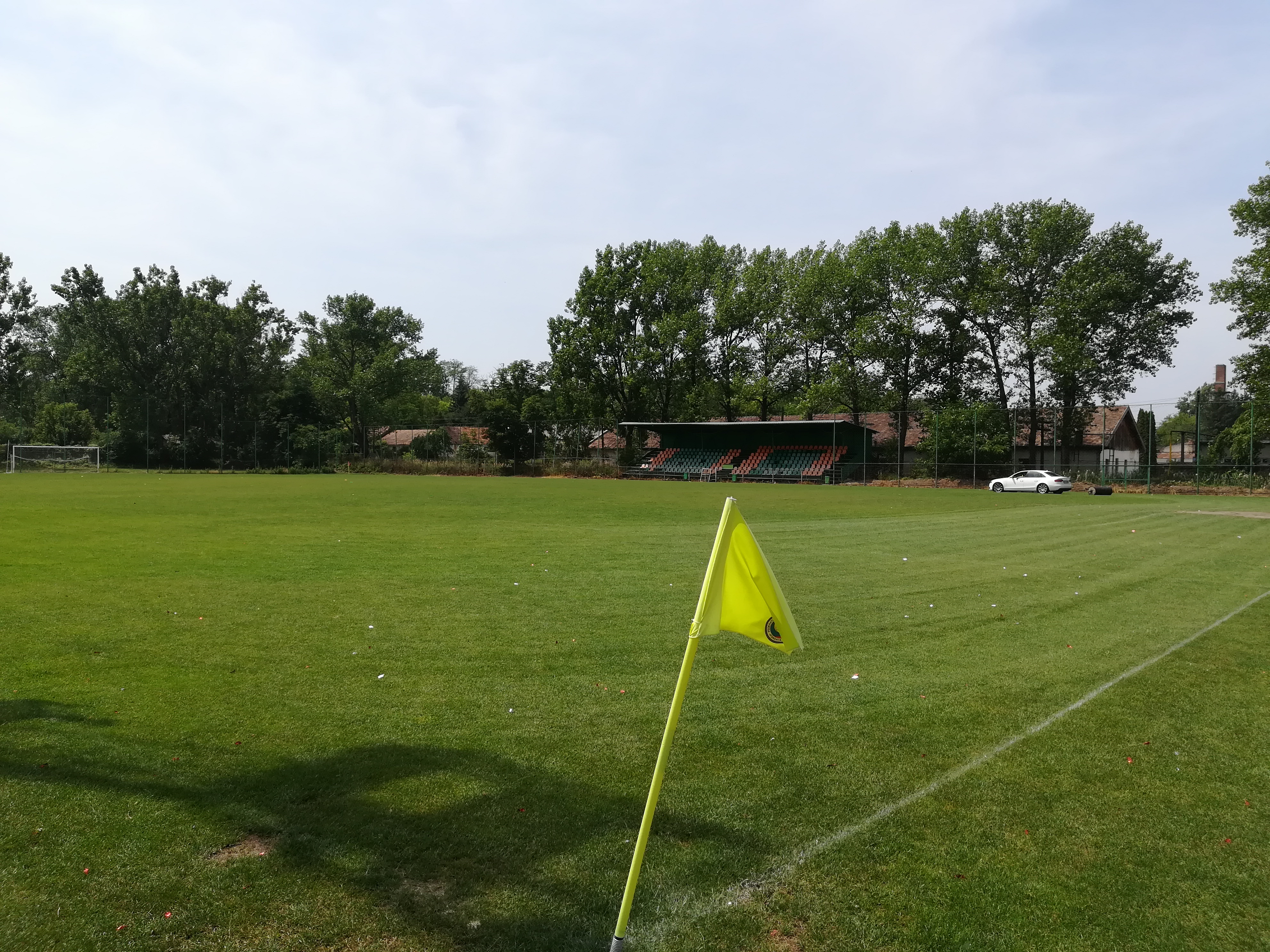
- Interactive map of Stadionul Victoria Someșeni
- Address: Str. Nicolae Pascaly, nr. 7
- Location: Cluj-Napoca, Romania
- Coordinates: 46°46′35″N 23°39′55.3″E
- Owner: CFR Cluj
- Operator: CFR Cluj
- Capacity: 1,300
- Surface: Grass; Artificial turf

Construction
- Renovated: 2009; 17 years ago
- Expanded: 2009; 17 years ago

Tenants
- Victoria Someșeni; Sănătatea Cluj (2010–2015, 2018–2020); Ardealul Cluj (2009–2021); Olimpia Cluj (2010–2018); Victoria Cluj (2019–2020); CFR II Cluj (2021–2023)

Stadionul Victoria Someșeni, also known as Baza Sportivă Ardealul, is a multi-use stadium in Cluj-Napoca, Romania. It is used mostly for football matches and is the home ground of CFR Cluj youth academy. The stadium holds 1,300 people (1,000 on the main stand and 300 on the stand of the artificial turf). It was renovated in 2009, when was also expanded with the 300 people stand and the artificial turf.
