= Viorel Mateianu Stadium =

Stadium in Romania

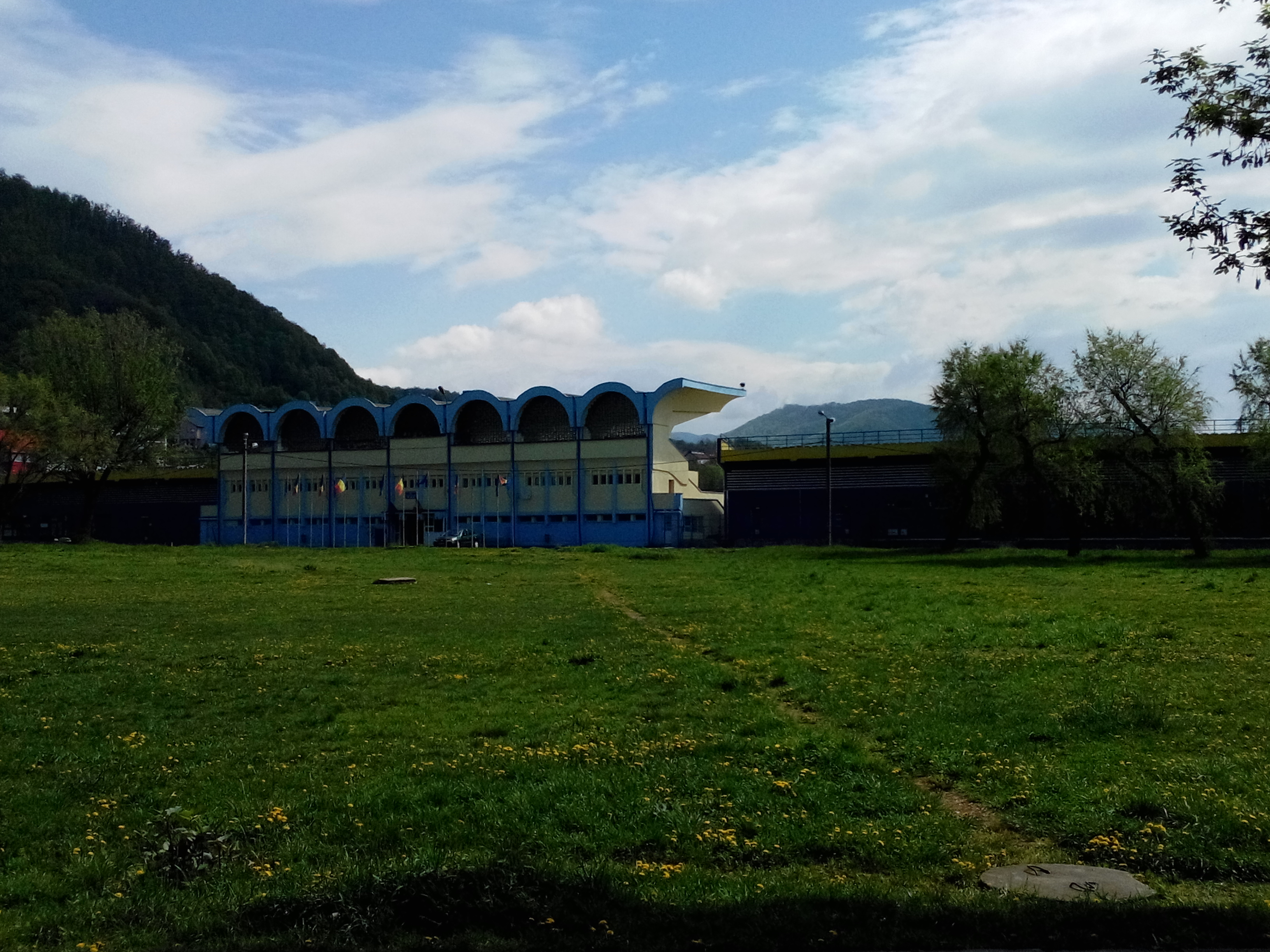
- Interactive map of Viorel Mateianu Stadium
- Former names: Municipal Stadium (1923–1950); 23 August Stadium (1950–1989); Dealul Florilor Stadium (1990–2009)
- Address: Str. Câmpul Tineretului, nr. 1
- Location: Baia Mare, Romania
- Coordinates: 47°39′54″N 23°34′45″E
- Owner: Municipality of Baia Mare
- Operator: Minaur Baia Mare
- Capacity: 8,000 seated, restricted from 15,500
- Surface: Grass

Construction
- Opened: 1923
- Renovated: 2008

Tenants
- Minaur Baia Mare (1950–present); FC Maramureș (2010–2013)

The Viorel Mateianu Stadium is a multi-purpose stadium in Baia Mare, Romania. It is the home ground of Minaur Baia Mare. It holds 15,500 people.

It was built in the early 1950s. The stands used to be overcrowded during Minerul Baia Mare's golden era when between 20,000 and 25,000 people used to come and see the local team playing.

Big names of European football, such as Real Madrid and Steaua Bucharest, played on this stadium in the past.

The stadium is ranked 22nd in order of capacity in Romania.

Previously the stadium was named 23 August and Dealul Florilor.

The stadium is named after Viorel Mateianu, the famous coach that trained FC Baia Mare between 1977 and 1981.

== Gallery ==
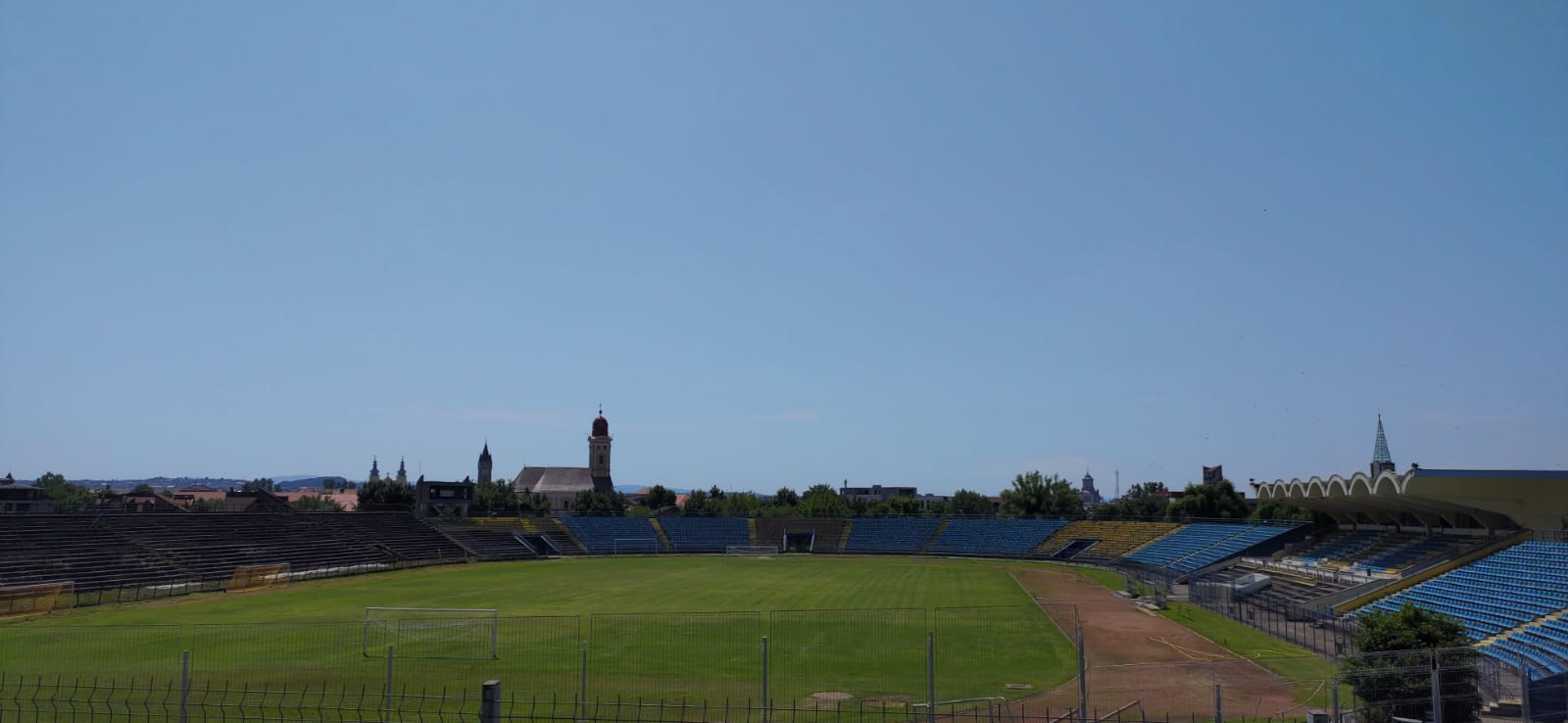
Viorel Mateianu Stadium panorama
