= Stadionul Siderurgistul =

Multi-use stadium in Galaţi, Romania

Siderurgistul
- Interactive map of Siderurgistul
- Location: Galaţi, Galaţi, Romania
- Coordinates: 45°25′14.5″N 28°1′37″E
- Owner: Galați Municipality
- Operator: Oţelul Galaţi
- Surface: artificial turf

Construction
- Renovated: 2009

Tenants
- Siderurgistul Galați (1961–1967); Oţelul II (2006–2015); Politehnica Galaţi (2006–2012); Oțelul Galați (2016–2017)

Siderurgistul Stadium is a multi-purpose stadium located in Galaţi, Romania. Primarily a football venue, it is the home ground for the Oţelul Galaţi youth squads. However, the stadium's design allows for concerts as well. The stadium holds about 6,000 people.
