= Odorheiu Secuiesc Municipal Stadium =

Romanian stadium

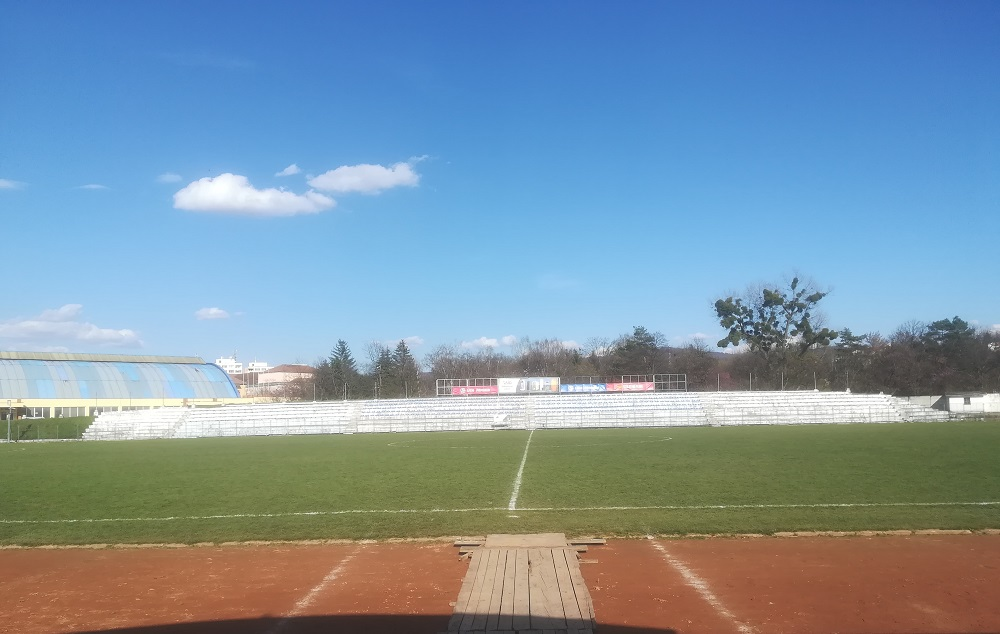
- Interactive map of Odorheiu Secuiesc Municipal Stadium
- Address: Str. Parcului
- Location: Odorheiu Secuiesc, Romania
- Coordinates: 46°18′17.8″N 25°17′12.5″E
- Owner: Municipality of Odorhei
- Operator: Odorheiu Secuiesc; Vasas Femina
- Capacity: 5,000
- Surface: Grass

Construction
- Opened: 1922

Tenants
- Odorheiu Secuiesc (1922–present); Vasas Femina (2012–present)

The Odorheiu Secuiesc Municipal Stadium is a multi-use stadium in Odorheiu Secuiesc, Romania. It is used mostly for football matches and is the home ground of AFC Odorheiu Secuiesc and Vasas Femina FC. The stadium holds 5,000 people and the sports complex also benefits of a second ground with a pitch of normal dimensions, covered by artificial turf.
