= FCU Olimpia Cluj =

Romanian football club

U Olimpia Cluj
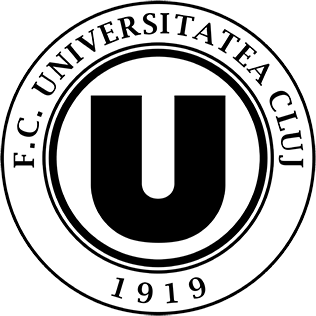
- Full name: Fotbal Club U Olimpia; Cluj-Napoca
- Nickname: Studentele (The Students)
- Founded: 7 July 2010; 16 years ago
- Ground: Clujana / Cluj Arena
- Capacity: 1,300 / 30,335
- Owner: Radu Munteanu
- Chairman: Alin Cioban
- Manager: Ioana Bortan
- League: Liga I
- 2025–26: Liga I, 3rd
- Website: https://u-olimpiacluj.ro
Home colours	Away colours

Fotbal Club U Olimpia Cluj-Napoca, commonly known as FCU Olimpia Cluj, or simply as U Olimpia Cluj, is a women's football team from Cluj-Napoca in Romania. It is Romania's top women's football club, having won all league titles since its inception, and thus represents Romania year by year in the UEFA Women's Champions League. The club also gives a majority of the Romania women's national football team players.

== History ==
Founded on 7 July 2010 at the initiative of Mirel Albon, Clujana's coach, due to increasingly divergent views with his club's owners, Olimpia started directly in Romania's top level women's league, as there was no second-level league at the time, and convincingly won the championship in its very first season. The team won all of its 24 matches which totaled a goal difference of 253–11 and wins as high as 26–0 and 27–0. The title qualified them for the 2011–12 UEFA Women's Champions League. In addition they won the Romanian cup that year too. They went on to win all of the league titles since, and most of the domestic cups.

Olimpia had a partnership with the Technical University of Cluj-Napoca, its rector, Radu Munteanu being for a period of time also Olimpia's chairman (president). This partnership reflected in the team's name between 2012 and 2015. Since the 2018–19 season, the teams signed a partnership with FC Universitatea Cluj and has rebranded as "U" Olimpia Cluj.

=== Chronology of names ===
Period	Full Club Name	Short name
2011–2012	Clubul de Fotbal Feminin Olimpia Cluj-Napoca	Olimpia Cluj
2012–2015	Clubul de Fotbal Feminin Olimpia Universitatea Tehnică Cluj-Napoca	Olimpia UT Cluj
2015–2018	Clubul de Fotbal Feminin Olimpia Cluj-Napoca	Olimpia Cluj
2018–present	Asociația Fotbal Club Universitatea Olimpia Cluj	U Olimpia Cluj

== Football Academy ==
Together with the club in 2010 the Olimpia Women's Football Academy was established, supported by a partnership with the city and the council. The goal of south-east Europe's first female football academy is to advance women's football in Romania.

== Honours ==
=== Leagues ===
- Liga I
  - Winners (12): 2010–11, 2011–12, 2012–13, 2013–14, 2014–15, 2015–16, 2016–17, 2017–18, 2018–19, 2020–21, 2021–22, 2022–23
  - First place, not declared Winners (1): 2019–20

=== Cups ===
- Romanian Women's Cup
  - Winners (8): 2010–11, 2011–12, 2012–13, 2013–14, 2014–15, 2016–17, 2020–21, 2021–22
  - Runners-up (1): 2015–16

== Season by season ==
Champions Runners-up Third place Promoted Relegated

Season		Division	Tier	Place	Cup	WCL
1	2010–11	Liga I	1	1st	W	–
2	2011–12	Liga I, Seria Vest	1	1st	W	R32
3	2012–13	Liga I, Seria Vest	1	1st	W	R16
4	2013–14	Superliga	1	1st	W	Grp
5	2014–15	Superliga	1	1st	W	Grp
6	2015–16	Superliga	1	1st	F	R32
7	2016–17	Superliga	1	1st	W	Grp
8	2017–18	Liga I	1	1st	QF	R32
9	2018–19	Liga I	1	1st	SF	Grp
10	2019–20	Liga I	1	1st (Note: not crowned as Champions)	QF*	Grp
11	2020–21	Liga I	1	1st	W	2QR
12	2021–22	Liga I	1	1st	W	1R
13	2022–23	Liga I	1	1st	F	1R
14	2023–24	Liga I	1	2nd	W	2R
15	2024–25	Liga I	1	4th		–

== Current squad ==
As of August 2021

Note: Flags indicate national team as defined under FIFA eligibility rules; some limited exceptions apply. Players may hold more than one non-FIFA nationality.

No.	Pos.	Nation	Player
2	DF	ROU	Sonia Bumbar
3	DF	ROU	Cristina Botojel
4	MF	ROU	Ioana Bortan (Captain)
7	MF	MDA	Carolina Țabur
9	MF	ROU	Mihaela Ciolacu
10	MF	ROU	Roxana Mirea
11	FW	ROU	Mara Bâtea
12	GK	ROU	Sara Câmpean
14	FW	ROU	Adina Borodi
15	MF	ROU	Andreea Pînzariu
16	DF	ROU	Anamaria Salagean
17	DF	ROU	Varo Helga

No.	Pos.	Nation	Player
18	GK	ROU	Alesia Moldovan
19	DF	ROU	Noemi Vincze
20	DF	ROU	Karina Bede
21	DF	ROU	Simona Sigheartau
22	DF	ROU	Maria Stamate
23	MF	ROU	Oana Negrea
31	GK	USA	Erin Louise Seppi
44	DF	FRA	Cloe Macuiba
77	MF	ROU	Florentina Iancu
88	DF	ROU	Daiana Onet
90	FW	ROU	Carmen Marcu
99	FW	ROU	Ioana Nicoleta Balaceanu

== Club officials ==
=== Board of directors ===
Role	Name
President	(Romania) Radu Munteanu
Honorary President	(Romania) Erika Hristea
Executive President	(Romania) Alin Cioban
Vice-president	(Romania) Eugen Cocan
General Manager	(Romania) Mirel Albon
Administrative Manager	(Romania) Ioan Vlas

- Last updated: 13 January 2019

=== Current technical staff ===
Role	Name
Manager	(Romania) Ioana Bortan
Assistant Managers	(Romania) Tiberiu Stranyezky
Goalkeeping Coach	(Romania) Mirela Ganea Pop

- Last updated: 13 January 2019

== FC U Olimpia Cluj in Europe ==
In their first participation they started in the qualifying round of the 2011–12 UEFA Women's Champions League. Already after two wins against Bosnian and Lithuanian opposition they qualified for the round of 32.

UEFA Women's Cup / UEFA Women's Champions League
Season	Preliminary stage	Round of 32	Round of 16	Quarterfinals	Semi-finals	Final
2011–12	(Bosnia and Herzegovina) Sarajevo ^{1}	(France) Olympique				
2012–13	(Portugal) 1º Dezembro ^{1}	(Austria) Neulengbach	(Italy) Torres			
2013–14	(Serbia) Spartak ^{1}					
2014–15	(Republic of Ireland) Raheny ^{1}					
2015–16	(Slovenia) Pomurje ^{1}	(France) PSG				
2016–17	(Poland) Medyk ^{1}					
2017–18	(Scotland) Hibernian ^{1}	(Sweden) Rosengård				

^{1} Group stage. Highest-ranked eliminated team in case of qualification, lowest-ranked qualified team in case of elimination.

== Notable former players ==
The footballers enlisted below have been called up or had international cap(s) for their respective countries at junior and/or senior level and/or more than 50 caps for U Olimpia Cluj.

- (Romania) Cosmina Dușa
- (Romania) Maria Ficzay
- (Romania) Adina Giurgiu
- (Romania) Daniela Gurz
- (Ghana) Priscilla Hagan
- (Romania) Lidia Havriștiuc
- (Kazakhstan) Nazym Ismailova
- (Romania) Alexandra Iușan
- (Romania) Alexandra Lunca
- (Cameroon) Christine Manie
- (Romania) Isabelle Mihail
- (Romania) Corina Olar
- (Romania) Olivia Oprea
- (Romania) Andreea Părăluță
- (Romania) Raluca Sârghe
- (Russia) Ekaterina Ulasevich
- (Hungary) Fanny Vágó
- (Romania) Ștefania Vătafu
