= CSȘ Târgoviște (women's football) =

Romanian Women's football club

- Full name: Clubul Sportiv Școlar Târgoviște
- Nickname(s): Târgoviștencele (The Women from Târgoviște)
- Short name: Târgoviște
- Founded: 2005
- Ground: Alpan
- Capacity: 1,000
- League: not active
- 2021–22: Liga I, 12th (relegated)
- Website: http://www.csstargoviste.ro
Home colours	Away colours

Clubul Sportiv Școlar Târgoviște, commonly known as CSȘ Târgoviște, or simply Târgoviște, is a Romanian women's football club based in Târgoviște, Dâmbovița County, Romania. The team was founded in 2005 as a section of CSȘ Târgoviște sports society and appeared for the first time in the Liga I in the 2005–06 season when it finished 3rd.

The best performance of the club was winning the Romanian Women's Cup in the 2017–18 season, after a 3–0 win in the final against Heniu Prundu Bârgăului.

== Honours ==
=== Leagues ===
- Liga I
  - Runners-up (1): 2007–08
- Liga II
  - Winners (2): 2015–16, 2020–21
  - Runners-up (1): 2014–15

=== Cups ===
- Romanian Women's Cup
  - Winners (1): 2017–18
  - Runners-up (1): 2008–09

== Season by season ==
Champions Runners-up Third place Promoted Relegated

Season		Division	Tier	Place	Cup	WCL
1	2005–06	Divizia A	1	3rd	SF	–
2	2006–07	Liga I	1	3rd	QF	–
3	2007–08	Liga I	1	2nd	SF	–
4	2008–09	Liga I	1	3rd	F	–
5	2009–10	Liga I	1	6th	SF	–
6	2010–11	Liga I	1	8th	1R	–
7	2011–12	Liga I, Seria Est	1	8th	QF	–
8	2012–13	Liga I, Seria Sud	1	11th	SF	–
9	2013–14	Liga I, Seria Sud	2	5th	QF	–
10	2014–15	Liga I, Seria II	2	2nd	R16	–
11	2015–16	Liga I, Seria I	2	1st	QF	–
12	2016–17	Superliga	1	7th	SF	–
13	2017–18	Liga I	1	4th	W	–
14	2018–19	Liga I	1	9th	QF	–
15	2019–20	Liga I	1	7th	2R	–
16	2020–21	Liga II	2	1st	2R	–
17	2021–22	Liga I	1	12th	2R	–
