= 2011 FIFA Women's World Cup qualification – UEFA Group 4 =

Football tournament qualification stage

The 2011 FIFA Women's World Cup qualification UEFA Group 4 was a UEFA qualifying group for the 2011 FIFA Women's World Cup. The group comprised Ukraine, Poland, Hungary, Romania and Bosnia and Herzegovina.

Ukraine advanced to the play-off rounds after winning the group.

== Standings ==
Team	Pld	W	D	L	GF	GA	GD	Pts	Ukraine	Poland	Hungary	Romania	Bosnia and Herzegovina
Ukraine	8	5	2	1	24	9	+15	17	—	3–1	4–2	3–1	7–0
Poland	8	5	1	2	18	9	+9	16	4–1	—	0–0	2–0	1–0
Hungary	8	4	3	1	15	10	+5	15	1–1	4–2	—	1–1	2–0
Romania	8	2	2	4	14	13	+1	8	0–0	1–4	2–3	—	4–0
Bosnia and Herzegovina	8	0	0	8	0	30	−30	0	0–5	0–4	0–2	0–5	—

== Results ==
19 September 2009
16:00 UTC+2

Poland	4–1	Ukraine
Winczo 7', 30', 55'; Leśnik 38'	Report	Pekur 83'

Stadion im. Ojca Władysława Augustynka, Nowy Sącz
Referee: Sabine Bonnin (France)
19 September 2009
17:00 UTC+2

Bosnia and Herzegovina	0–2	Hungary
	Report	Padár 77'; Krenács 84'

Asim Ferhatović Hase Stadium, Sarajevo
Referee: Paloma Quintero Siles (Spain)

23 September 2009
17:00 UTC+3

Romania	4–0	Bosnia and Herzegovina
Pavel 37' (pen.); Duşa 42', 45'; Spânu 65'	Report

Stadionul Buftea, Buftea
Referee: Marina Mamayeva (Russia)

24 September 2009
16:00 UTC+2

Hungary	4–2	Poland
Méry 34'; Tóth 67'; Padár 87'; Vagó 90+2' (pen.)	Report	Żyła 25'; Pożerska 52'

Stadion Városi, Sopron
Referee: Anja Kunick (Germany)

24 October 2009
15:00 UTC+2

Poland	2–0	Romania
Winczo 19'; Żelazko 71'	Report

Stadion Dyskobolii, Grodzisk Wielkopolski
Referee: Petra Chudá (Slovakia)

25 October 2009
16:00 UTC+2

Ukraine	7–0	Bosnia and Herzegovina
Pekur 9', 43'; Apanaschenko 13', 42'; Dyatel 36'; Khodyreva 41'; Chorna 48'	Report

Stadion Yuri Gagarin, Chernihiv
Referee: Betina Norman (Denmark)

28 October 2009
15:00 UTC+1

Hungary	1–1	Romania
Méry 82'	Report	Duşa 68'

Stadion Városi, Sopron
Referee: Morag Pirie (Scotland)

29 October 2009
15:00 UTC+1

Bosnia and Herzegovina	0–4	Poland
	Report	Stobba 24'; Żyła 47'; Tarczyńska 55'; Pożerska 70'

Asim Ferhatović Hase Stadium, Sarajevo
Referee: Knarik Grigoryan (Armenia)

14 November 2009
17:00 UTC+1

Hungary	1–1	Ukraine
Jakabfi 16'	Report	Chorna 63'

Stadion Városi, Sopron
Referee: Christina Westrum Pedersen (Norway)

27 March 2010
15:00 UTC+1

Bosnia and Herzegovina	0–5	Romania
	Report	Vatafu 25'; Duşa 50'; Rus 65'; Laiu 66'; Sarghe 77'

Asim Ferhatović Hase Stadium, Sarajevo
Referee: Ginta Pece (Latvia)

31 March 2010
14:00 UTC+3

Romania	1–4	Poland
Laiu 39'	Report	Winczo 13', 63', 82'; Tarczyńska 29'

Stadionul Mogoşoaia, Mogoşoaia
Referee: Esther Staubli (Switzerland)
31 March 2010
17:00 UTC+2

Hungary	2–0	Bosnia and Herzegovina
Vágó 9'; Pádár 37'	Report

Stadion Városi, Sopron
Referee: Hilal Tuba Tosun Ayer (Turkey)

20 May 2010
18:00 UTC+3

Ukraine	4–2	Hungary
Apanaschenko 6', 36'; Khodyreva 81'; Boychenko 85'	Report	Jakabfi 38', 71'

Stadion Yuri Gagarin, Chernihiv
Referee: Sandra Braz Bastos (Portugal)

19 June 2010
18:00 UTC+2

Bosnia and Herzegovina	0–5	Ukraine
	Report	Apanaschenko 11', 57'; Dyatel 23'; Boychenko 73', 77'

Asim Ferhatović Hase Stadium, Sarajevo
Referee: Zuzana Kováčová (Slovakia)
19 June 2010
18:15 UTC+2

Poland	0–0	Hungary
	Report

Arena Kielc, Kielce
Referee: Kirsi Heikkinen (Finland)

23 June 2010
18:00 UTC+3

Romania	0–0	Ukraine
	Report

Stadionul Mogoşoaia, Mogoşoaia
Referee: Silvia Tea Spinelli (Italy)

24 June 2010
18:00 UTC+2

Poland	1–0	Bosnia and Herzegovina
Pożerska 74'	Report

OSiR-u, Racibórz
Referee: Florence Guillemin (France)

21 August 2010
19:00 UTC+3

Ukraine	3–1	Romania
Apanaschenko 24', 66'; Boychenko 49'	Report	Dusa 56'

Stadion Yuri Gagarin, Chernihiv
Referee: Tanja Schett (Austria)

25 August 2010
18:00 UTC+3

Romania	2–3	Hungary
Spanu 38'; Olar 48'	Report	Jakabfi 15', 34', 90+1' (pen.)

Stadionul Mogoşoaia, Mogoşoaia
Referee: Sofia Karagiorgi (Cyprus)
25 August 2010
19:00 UTC+3

Ukraine	3–1	Poland
Boychenko 61'; Apanaschenko 67', 72'	Report	Tarczyńska 18'

Stadion Yuri Gagarin, Chernihiv
Referee: Bibiana Steinhaus (Germany)

== Goalscorers ==
7 goals

- (Poland) Agnieszka Winczo

4 goals

- (Romania) Cosmina Duşa

3 goals

- (Poland) Agata Tarczyńska
- (Poland) Patrycja Pożerska
- (Ukraine) Lyudmyla Pekur

2 goals

- (Hungary) Anita Pádár
- (Hungary) Rita Méry
- (Poland) Ewa Żyła
- (Romania) Andreea Laiu
- (Ukraine) Daryna Apanaschenko
- (Ukraine) Tetyana Chorna

1 goal

- (Hungary) Fanny Vagó
- (Hungary) Gabriella Tóth
- (Hungary) Lilla Krenács
- (Hungary) Zsanett Jakabfi
- (Poland) Anna Żelazko
- (Poland) Donata Leśnik
- (Poland) Marta Stobba
- (Romania) Elena Pavel
- (Romania) Florentina Spânu
- (Romania) Laura Roxana Rus
- (Romania) Raluca Sarghe
- (Romania) Stefania Iuliana Vatafu
- (Ukraine) Olena Khodyreva
- (Ukraine) Vera Djatel
