= FC Ripensia Timișoara (women) =

Ripensia Timișoara
- Full name: Fotbal Club Ripensia 2000 Timișoara
- Nickname(s): Bănățencele (The Women from Banat); Timișorencele (The Women from Timișoara)
- Short name: Ripensia
- Founded: 2006; 19 years ago
- Dissolved: 2009
- Ground: Stadionul Știința
- Capacity: 1,000
- 2008–09: Liga I, 2nd
Home colours	Away colours

FC Ripensia 2000 Timișoara was a Romanian women's football team from Timișoara, named after the homonym male club from the interwar period that played in the Romanian top-tier Liga I between 2006 and 2009.

== History ==
Ripensia was founded in 2006 and it only participated in the Romanian Women's Cup in its first season, since the women's first league had already started. Its first official match was a 13–1 win against Reșița. In the autumn of 2006 it joined Liga I, where it played for a total of 3 seasons. In its last season it was Liga I's runner-up and it won the national cup, defeating CSS Târgoviște 4–0 in the final. However, the cup final was its last official match, as two months later the team was disbanded due to a lack of sponsors. In 2011, several former players from the team joined newly created CFR Timișoara.

== Honours ==
=== Leagues ===
- Liga I
  - Runners-up (1): 2008–09

=== Cups ===
- Romanian Women's Cup
  - Winners (1): 2008–09

== Season by season ==
Champions Runners-up Third place Promoted Relegated

Season		Division	Tier	Place	Cup	WCL
1	2005–06	–	–	–	QF	–
2	2006–07	Liga I	1	8th	SF	–
3	2007–08	Liga I	1	4th	1R	–
4	2008–09	Liga I	1	2nd	W	–
