= Cosmina Dușa =

Romanian footballer (born 1990)

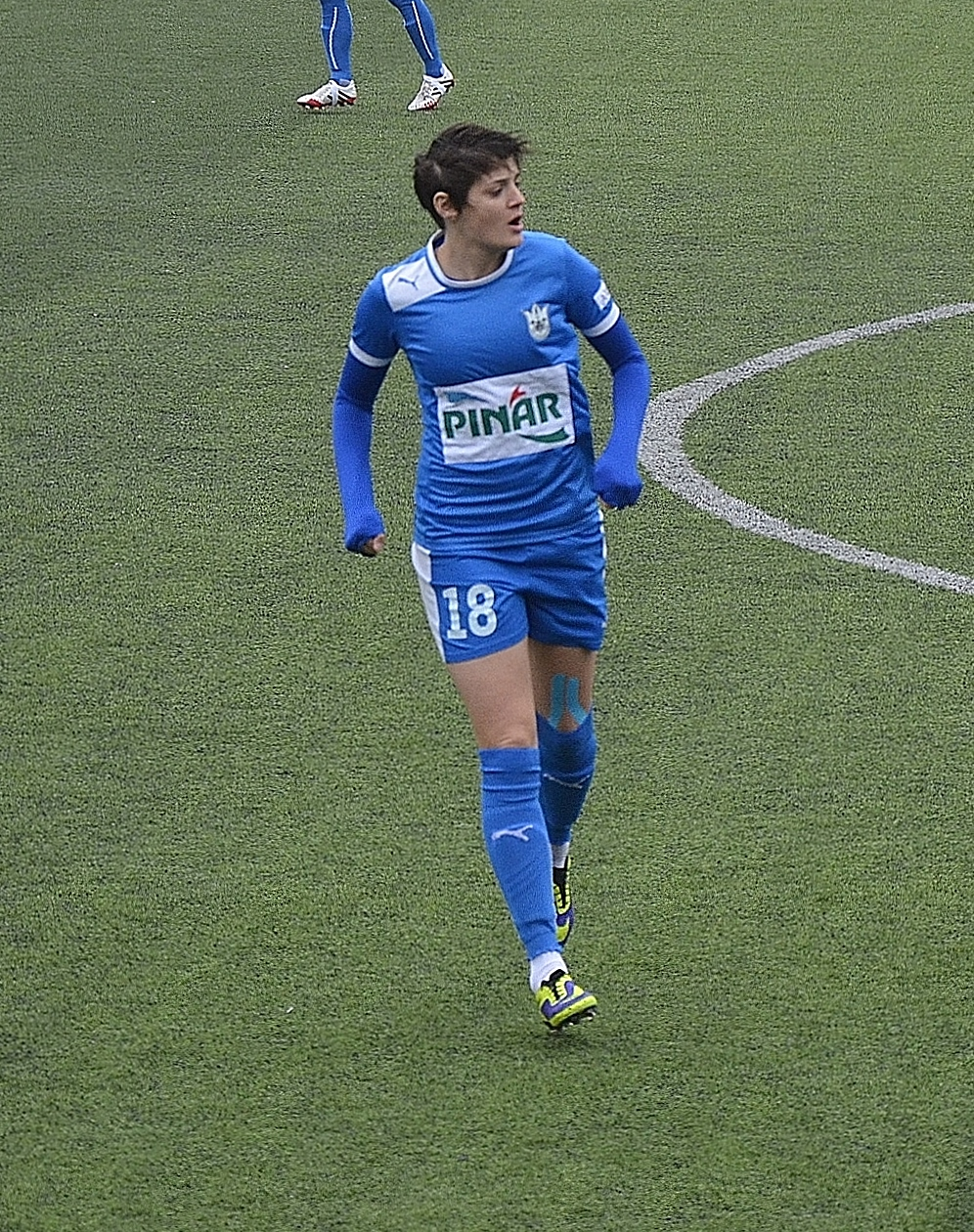
- Dușa playing for Konak Belediyespor in the 2013–14 season

Personal information
- Full name: Cosmina Anișoara Dușa
- Date of birth: 4 March 1990 (age 36)
- Place of birth: Iernut, Romania
- Position: Forward

Team information
- Current team: Konak Belediyespor
- Number: 18

Youth career
- CFF Clujana Cluj

Senior career*
Years	Team	Apps	(Gls)
2007–2009	CFF Clujana Cluj		
2009–2010	AS Volos 2004	6	(42)
2010–2012	CFF Olimpia Cluj	48	(174)
2012–2020	Konak Belediyespor	120	(144)
2022–	Beroe	1	(0)

International career^{‡}
2008–2009	Romania U-19	16	(6)
2009–	Romania	19	(15)
- * Club domestic league appearances and goals as of DecembFebruary 12, 2020 ‡ National team caps and goals as of 13:22, 10 January 2014 (UTC)

Cosmina Anișoara Dușa (born 4 March 1990) is a Romanian footballer who plays as a forward for Beroe in Bulgaria and the Romanian national team. As a player she won the national championship, the national cup and was top scorer of the league.

== Career ==
=== Club ===
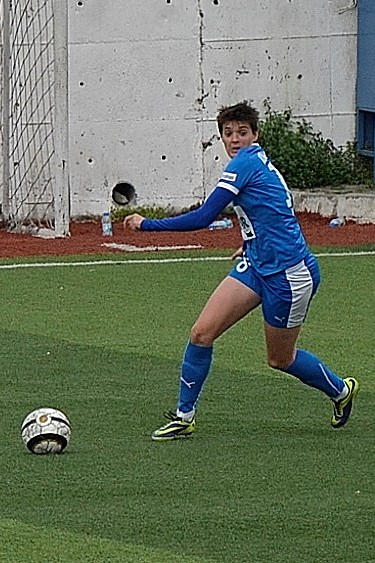
Dușa for Konak Belediyespor in the 2013–14 season

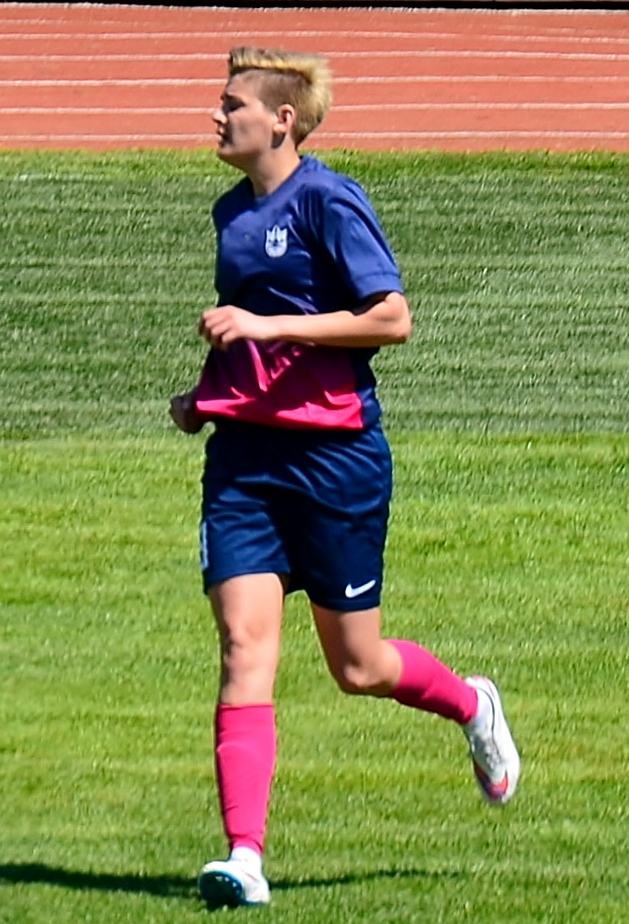
Dușa for Konak Belediyespor in the 2014–15 season

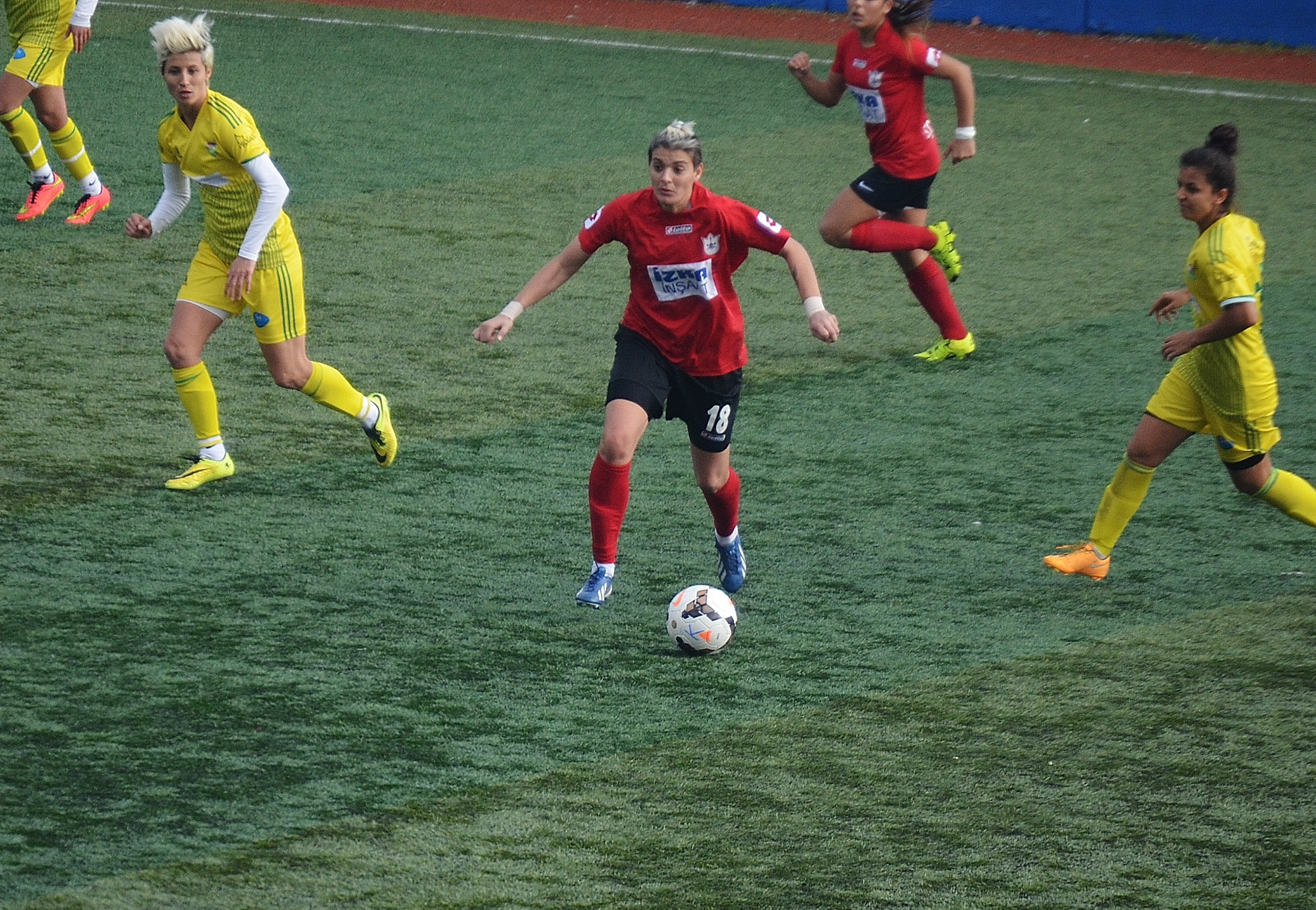
Dușa (red/black) driving the ball for Konak Belediyespor in the away match of the 2015–16 season against Kireçburnu Spor

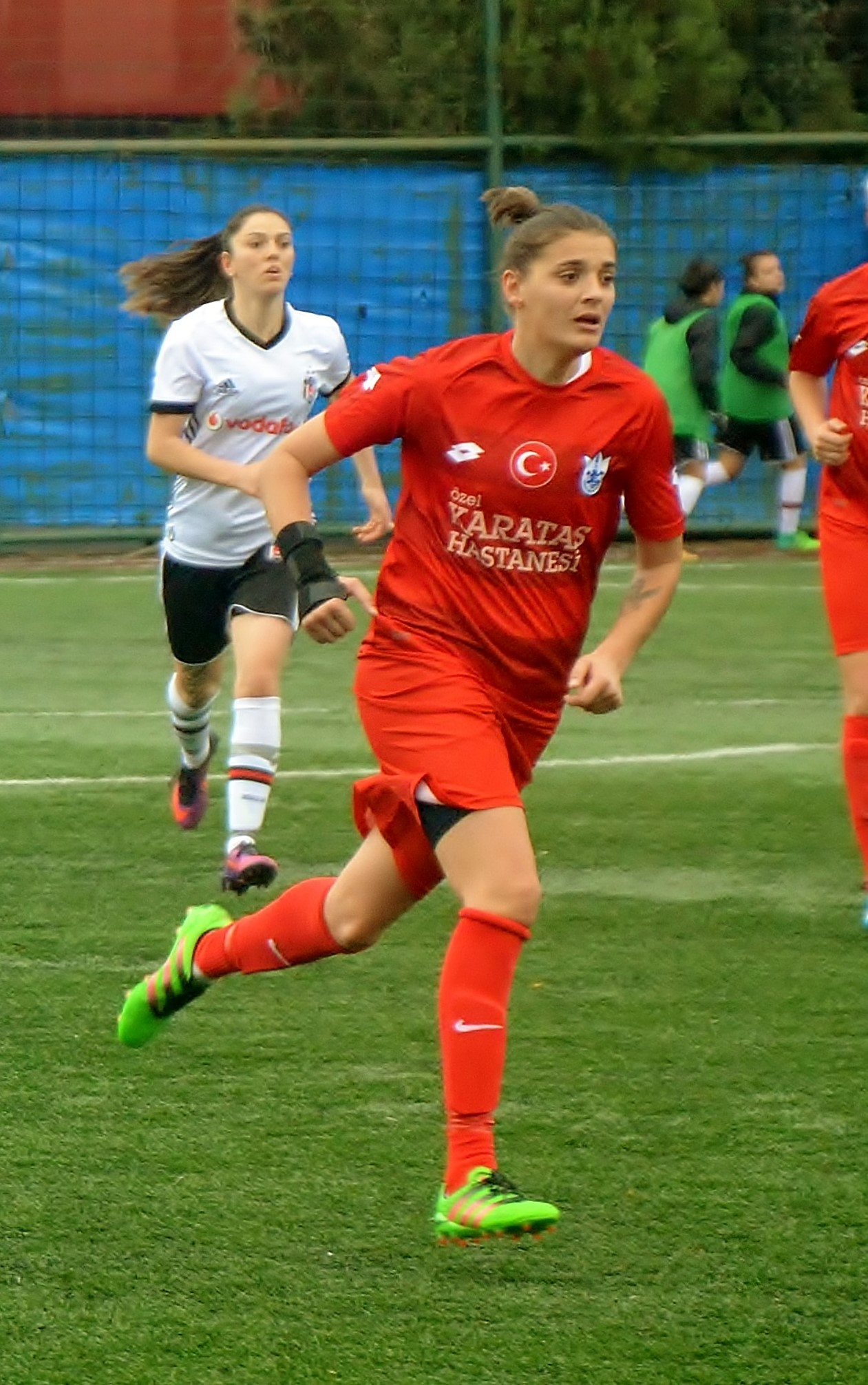
Dușa (red) playing for Konak Belediyespor against Beşiktaş J.K. in the 2017–18 season's away match

Dușa started playing football in primary school with her brother's friends. At the age of 17, she was accepted by the Romanian women's football club champions, CFF Clujana Cluj. She made her official debut in a 2007–08 UEFA Women's Cup match against Umeå IK; scoring five goals in the three group matches. She later played for AS Volos 2004 from Greece and was called up for the Romania national team. In 2010, she returned to Cluj-Napoca and followed her first trainer, Mirel Albon, to the newly founded team CFF Olimpia Cluj. In the club's very first season Dușa scored 103 goals in the club's 24 matches, making her the Liga I top scorer. She repeated that feat by winning the 2012 top-scorer award with 71 goals. In the 2011–12 UEFA Women's Champions League qualifying she scored five goals in three matches.

She was awarded for "Best Women's Footballer" in Romania from 2010 to 2012.

By the end of September 2012, she transferred to the İzmir-based club Konak Belediyespor in Turkey.

=== International ===
Dușa made her debut in the Romanian national team in March 2009 against Belgium. She featured for Romania in the 2011 FIFA Women's World Cup qualification tournament.

Goals scored in official competitions
Competition	Stage	Date	Location	Opponent	Goals	Result	Overall
(Germany) 2011 FIFA World Cup	Qualifiers	23 September 2009	Buftea	Bosnia and Herzegovina	2	4–0	5
(Germany) 2011 FIFA World Cup	Qualifiers	2009–10–28	Sopron	Hungary	1	1–1	5
(Germany) 2011 FIFA World Cup	Qualifiers	2010–03–27	Sarajevo	Bosnia and Herzegovina	1	5–0	5
(Germany) 2011 FIFA World Cup	Qualifiers	2010–08–21	Chernihiv	Ukraine	1	1–3	5
(Sweden) 2013 UEFA Euro	Qualifiers	21 September 2011	Aarau	Switzerland	1	1–4	6
(Sweden) 2013 UEFA Euro	Qualifiers	2011–10–27	Bucharest	Turkey	3	7–1	6
(Sweden) 2013 UEFA Euro	Qualifiers	2012–03–31	Buftea	Kazakhstan	1	3–0	6
(Sweden) 2013 UEFA Euro	Qualifiers	2012–06–21	Buftea	Switzerland	1	4–2	6
(Canada) 2015 FIFA World Cup	Qualifiers	20 September 2013	Strumica	North Macedonia	4	9–1	6
(Canada) 2015 FIFA World Cup	Qualifiers	2014–06–19	Haapsalu	Estonia	2	2–0	6
(Netherlands) 2017 UEFA Euro	Qualifiers	15 September 2017	Cluj	Ukraine	1	2–1	1
(France) 2019 FIFA World Cup	Qualifiers	20 October 2017	Leuven	Belgium	1	2–3	TBD

== Career statistics ==
As of 8 March 2020.

Club	Season	League			Champions League		National		Total	
Club	Season	Division	Apps	Goals	Apps	Goals	Apps	Goals	Apps	Goals
CFF Clujana Cluj
CFF Clujana Cluj	2007-2008	First League	-	-	3	5			3	5
CFF Clujana Cluj	2008-2009	First League	-	-	-	-			-	-
AS Volos 2004	2009-2010	First League	6	42	–	–			6	42
CFF Clujana Cluj
CFF Clujana Cluj	2010-2011	First League	24	103	–	–			24	103
CFF Clujana Cluj	2011-2012	First League	24	71	3	5			27	76
CFF Clujana Cluj	2012-2013	First League	0	0	3	8	-	-	3	8
Konak Belediyespor	2012–2013	First League	17	32	–	–			17	32
Konak Belediyespor	2013–14	First League	14	15	7	3			21	18
Konak Belediyespor	2014–15	First League	17	33	3	5			20	38
Konak Belediyespor	2015–16	First League	15	20	–	–			15	20
Konak Belediyespor	2016–17	First League	10	9	3	2			13	11
Konak Belediyespor	2017–18	First League	18	16	3	1			21	17
Konak Belediyespor	2018–19	First League	15	10	0	0			15	10
Konak Belediyespor	2019–20	First League	14	9	0	0			14	9
Konak Belediyespor	Total		174	360	25	29	-	-	199	389

== Honours ==
=== Club ===
Romania Liga I Feminin

CFF Clujana
Winners (2): 2007–08, 2008–09

CFF Olimpia Cluj
Winners (2): 2011, 2012

Romanian Women's Cupp

CFF Clujana
Winners (1): 2007–08

CFF Olimpia Cluj
Winners (2): 2011, 2012

Turkish Women's First League

Konak Belediyespor
Winners (5): 2012–13, 2013–14, 2014–15, 2015–16, 2016–17
Third place (1): 2017–18

=== Individual ===
Turkish Women's First League

Konak Belediyespor
Top scorer (3): 2012–13, 2013–14, 2014–15
