= 2004–05 Divizia A (women's football) =

Divizia A Feminin
- Season: 2004–05
- Champions: CFF Clujana (3rd title)

The 2004–05 season of the Divizia A Feminin was the 15th season of Romania's premier women's football league. Top four places qualified in the Championship play-off.

== Championship play-off ==
1. CFF Clujana (champion 2005–06 UEFA Women's Cup Qualifying round)
2. Pandurii Lignitul Târgu Jiu
3. Motorul Oradea
4. Şantierul Naval Constanţa

=== Final ===
9 June 2005	CFF Clujana	3–1	Pandurii Lignitul Târgu Jiu
	Rodica Striblea 38'; Florentina Spânu 81' 87'
