= 2002–03 Divizia A (women's football) =

Divizia A Feminin
- Season: 2002–03
- Champions: CFF Clujana (1st title)

The 2002–03 season of the Divizia A Feminin was the 13th season of Romania's premier women's football league. Two divisions (West/South) with 4 teams each played a sextuple round robin. First two places in each division qualified to the final tournament (single-leg semifinals and finals).

== Championship play-off ==
Pos	Team	Pld	W	D	L	GF	GA	GD	Pts	Qualification
1	CFF Clujana (C)	2	2	0	0	9	1	+8	6	2003–04 UEFA Women's Cup Qualifying round
2	Şantierul Naval Constanţa	2	1	0	1	3	3	0	3	
3	Smart Sport Bucharest	2	1	0	1	2	6	−4	3	
4	Motorul Oradea	2	0	0	2	0	4	−4	0	

Rules for classification: 1) points; 2) goal difference; 3) number of goals scored.
(C) Champions

=== Semifinals ===
18 June 2003

Clujana	6–0	Smart Sport Bucharest

18 June 2003

Şantierul Naval Constanţa	2–0	Motorul Oradea

=== Third Place ===
19 June 2003

Smart Sport Bucharest	2–0	Motorul Oradea

=== Final ===
19 June 2003

Clujana	3–1	Şantierul Naval Constanţa
