= Ștefania Vătafu =

Romanian footballer (born 1993)

Ştefania Vătafu
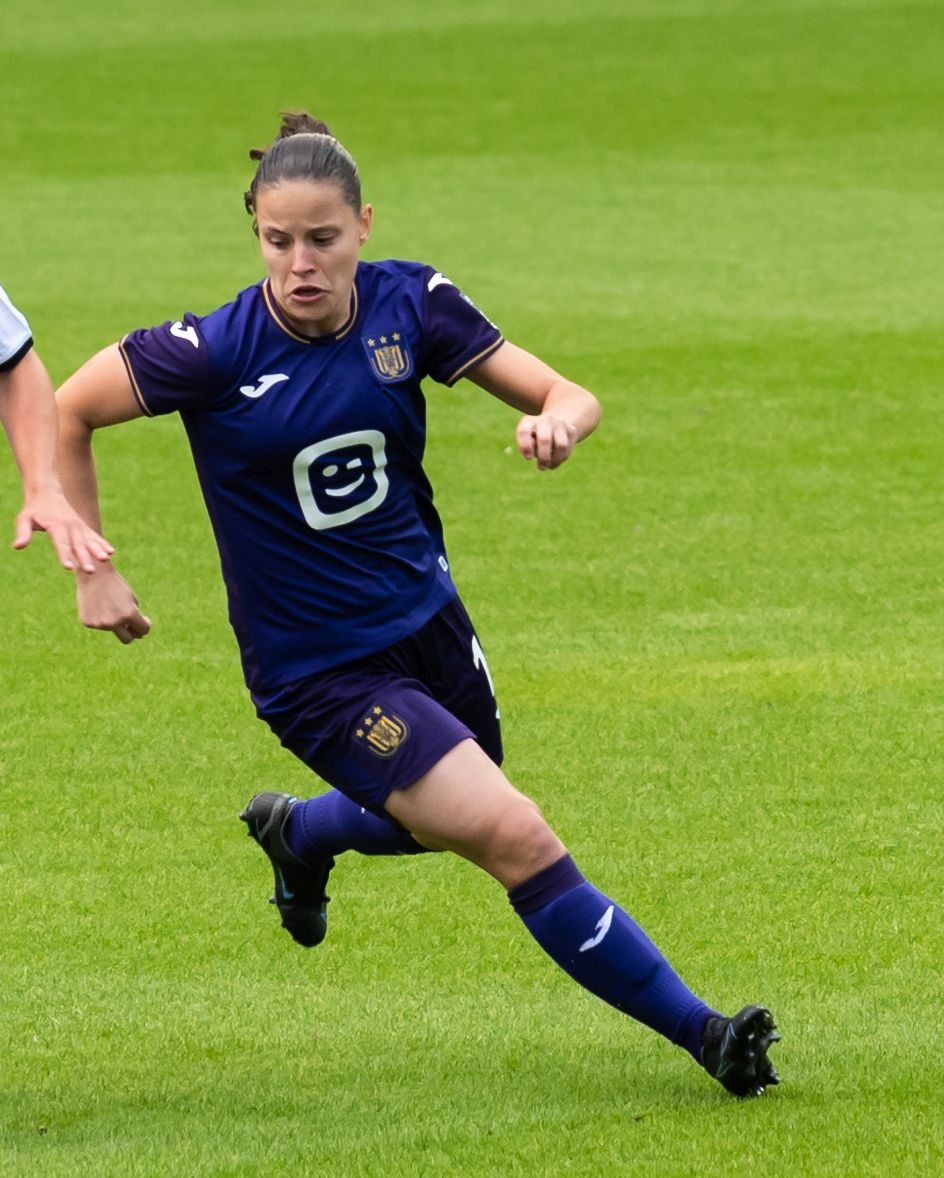
- Vătafu with Anderlecht in 2021

Personal information
- Full name: Ştefania Iuliana Vătafu
- Date of birth: 12 July 1993 (age 33)
- Place of birth: Râmnicu Vâlcea, Romania
- Height: 1.59 m (5 ft 3 in)
- Position: Midfielder

Team information
- Current team: Anderlecht
- Number: 10

Senior career*
| Years | Team | Apps | (Gls) |
| 2007–2010 | Clujana Cluj | | |
| 2010–2018 | Olimpia Cluj | 119 | (16) |
| 2018 | UD Granadilla TS | 12 | (0) |
| 2018– | Anderlecht | 125 | (18) |

International career
| 2009–2026 | Romania | 132 | (28) |
- * Club domestic league appearances and goals

Ştefania Iuliana Vătafu (Romanian: [ʃte.faˈni.a ju.liˈa.na vəˈta.fu]; born 12 July 1993) is a Romanian footballer who plays as a midfielder for Belgian Women's Super League (BWSL) club Anderlecht. She played for the Romania national team until her international retirement in 2026, earning 132 caps and scoring 28 goals.

== Career ==
Vătafu earned her first call-up for the Romanian national team at age 16. She played in Romania's Liga I for a decade, first for Clujana and later for Olimpia Cluj, also playing regularly the UEFA Champions League in both, before moving to Spain's UD Granadilla in the 2017–18 winter transfer window.

== International goals ==
| No. | Date | Venue | Opponent | Score | Result | Competition |
|---|---|---|---|---|---|---|
| 1. | 3 March 2019 | Gold City, Antalya, Turkey | India | 1–0 | 3–0 | 2019 Turkish Women's Cup |
| 2. | 3 March 2019 | Gold City, Antalya, Turkey | India | 3–0 | 3–0 | 2019 Turkish Women's Cup |
| 3. | 8 November 2019 | Stadionul Mogoșoaia, Mogoșoaia, Romania | Lithuania | 1–0 | 3–0 | UEFA Women's Euro 2022 qualifying |
| 4. | 23 October 2020 | Sūduva Stadium, Marijampolė, Lithuania | Lithuania | 1–0 | 4–0 | UEFA Women's Euro 2022 qualifying |
| 5. | 23 October 2020 | Sūduva Stadium, Marijampolė, Lithuania | Lithuania | 3–0 | 4–0 | UEFA Women's Euro 2022 qualifying |
| 6. | 2 September 2022 | LFF Stadium, Vilnius, Lithuania | Lithuania | 3–0 | 7–1 | 2023 FIFA Women's World Cup qualification |
| 7. | 16 February 2023 | GSZ Stadium, Larnaca, Cyprus | Hungary | 2–1 | 2–1 | 2023 Cyprus Women's Cup |
| 8. | 16 July 2023 | Stadionul Arcul de Triumf, Bucharest, Romania | Bulgaria | 2–0 | 2–0 | Friendly |
| 9. | 5 April 2024 | Armavir City Stadium, Armavir, Armenia | Armenia | 2–0 | 5–0 | UEFA Women's Euro 2025 qualifying |
| 10. | 31 May 2024 | Stadionul Arcul de Triumf, Bucharest, Romania | Bulgaria | 1–0 | 1–0 | UEFA Women's Euro 2025 qualifying |
| 11. | 4 June 2024 | Stadion Aleksandar Shalamanov, Sofia, Bulgaria | Bulgaria | 1–0 | 3–0 | UEFA Women's Euro 2025 qualifying |

== Honours ==
Clujana Cluj

- Liga I: 2008–09

Olimpia Cluj

- Liga I (8): 2010–11, 2011–12, 2012–13, 2013–14, 2014–15, 2015–16, 2016–17, 2017–18
- Romanian Cup (6): 2010–11, 2011–12, 2012–13, 2013–14, 2014–15, 2016–17

Anderlecht

- Super League (6): 2018–19, 2019–20, 2020–21, 2021–22, 2022–23, 2023–24
- Belgian Cup: 2021–22

Romania

- Turkish Women's Cup runner-up (2): 2017, 2019
- Cyprus Women's Cup third-place: 2023
