= Vătafu =

Vătafu may refer to:

- Ştefania Vătafu (born 1993), Romanian footballer
- Vătafu River, river in Romania
