= 2004 Cupa României (women's football) =

Cupa României 2004

Tournament details
- Country: Romania

Final positions
- Champions: Clujana (1st title)

The 2004 Cupa României was the 1st annual Romanian women's football knockout tournaments.

== Semifinals ==
Clujana	v	Pandurii

Şantierul Naval Constanţa	v	Crişul Aleşd

== Final ==
5 September 2004

Clujana	4–0	Şantierul Naval Constanţa
Florentina Spânu 1' 4'; Teodora Albon 84'; Rodica Striblea 90'
