= 2004–05 Cupa României (women's football) =

Cupa României 2005

Tournament details
- Country: Romania
- Teams: 10

Final positions
- Champions: Clujana (2nd title)

The 2004–05 Cupa României was the 2nd annual Romanian women's football knockout tournaments.

== Quarter-finals ==
8 May 2005

Clujana	v	Şantierul Naval Constanţa

8 May 2005

Pandurii	v	Motorul Oradea

8 May 2005

Spiru Haret/Lotus	v	Smart Sport București

8 May 2005

Şantierul Naval Constanţa (jr)/Proterm	v	CSS Târgoviște

== Semifinals ==
9 May 2005

Clujana	7–0	Pandurii

9 May 2005

Smart Sport București	2–0	CSS Târgoviște

== Final ==
11 May 2005

Clujana	2–1	Smart Sport București
Rodica Striblea; Teodora Albon		Ioana Bascoveanu

Universitatea „Spiru Haret”
Attendance: 50
