= Olha Boychenko =

Ukrainian footballer

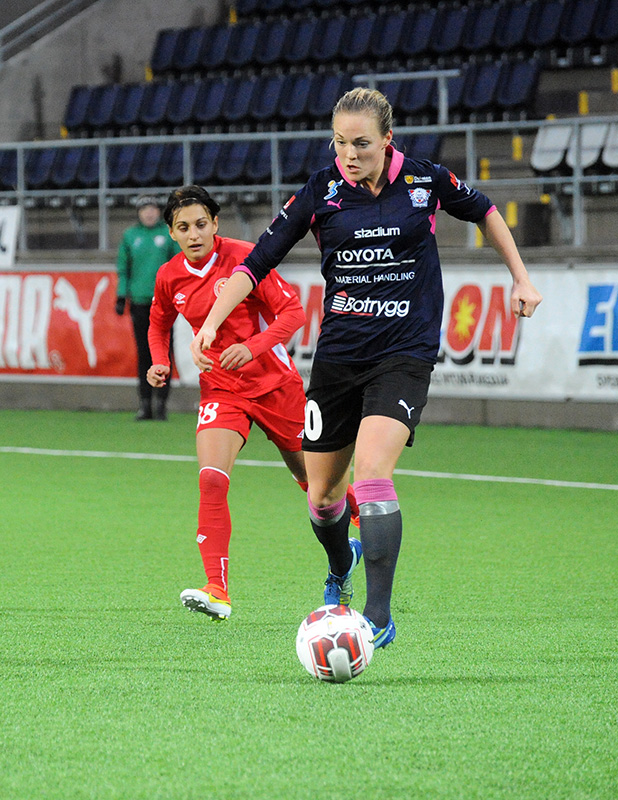
- Olha Boychenko, Magdalena Ericsson (2014)

Personal information
- Full name: Olha Boychenko
- Date of birth: 6 January 1989 (age 37)
- Place of birth: Odesa, Soviet Union (now Ukraine)
- Height: 1.58 m (5 ft 2 in)
- Position: Striker

Senior career*
| Years | Team | Apps | (Gls) |
| 2005–2007 | Yuzhanka Kherson | 26 | (17) |
| 2008–2010 | Lehenda Chernihiv | 35 | (22) |
| 2010–2015 | Zvezda Perm | 70 | (26) |
| 2012 | Naftokhimik Kalush | | |
| 2016–2017 | Rossiyanka | 10 | (1) |
| 2017 | Ryazan | 13 | (4) |
| 2020–2021 | Zhytlobud-1 | 21 | (19) |
| 2022 | Hayasa | 0 | (0) |
| 2022–2023 | Kryvbas Kryvyi Rih | 8 | (3) |
| 2023–2025 | SeaSters Odesa | 22 | (46) |

International career
| 2008–2021 | Ukraine | 63 | (14) |
- * Club domestic league appearances and goals

Olha Boychenko (born 6 January 1989) is a former Ukrainian footballer who played as a striker.

== Career ==
Boychenko had previously played for Zhytlobud-1, Naftokhimik Kalush and Lehenda Chernihiv in the Ukrainian League and for Zvezda Perm in the Russian Championship. She was a member of the Ukrainian national team and took part in the 2009 European Championship.

== Honours ==
Lehenda Chernihiv

- Ukrainian Women's League (2): 2009, 2010
- Women's Cup: (2) 2008, 2010

== International goals ==
| No. | Date | Venue | Opponent | Score | Result | Competition |
|---|---|---|---|---|---|---|
| 1. | 20 May 2010 | Stadion Yuri Gagarin, Chernihiv, Ukraine | Hungary | 4–2 | 4–2 | 2011 FIFA Women's World Cup qualification |
| 2. | 19 June 2010 | Asim Ferhatović Hase Stadium, Sarajevo, Bosnia & Herzegovina | Bosnia and Herzegovina | 4–0 | 5–0 | 2011 FIFA Women's World Cup qualification |
| 3. | 19 June 2010 | Asim Ferhatović Hase Stadium, Sarajevo, Bosnia & Herzegovina | Bosnia and Herzegovina | 5–0 | 5–0 | 2011 FIFA Women's World Cup qualification |
| 4. | 21 August 2010 | Stadion Yuri Gagarin, Chernihiv, Ukraine | Romania | 2–0 | 3–1 | 2011 FIFA Women's World Cup qualification |
| 5. | 25 August 2010 | Stadion Yuri Gagarin, Chernihiv, Ukraine | Poland | 1–1 | 3–1 | 2011 FIFA Women's World Cup qualification |
| 6. | 9 April 2014 | Parc y Scarlets, Llanneli, Wales | Wales | 1–0 | 1–1 | 2015 FIFA Women's World Cup qualification |
| 7. | 14 June 2014 | Arena Lviv, Lviv, Ukraine | Montenegro | 5–0 | 7–0 | 2015 FIFA Women's World Cup qualification |
| 8. | 13 September 2014 | Arena Lviv, Lviv, Ukraine | Turkey | 2–0 | 8–0 | 2015 FIFA Women's World Cup qualification |
| 9. | 13 September 2014 | Arena Lviv, Lviv, Ukraine | Turkey | 3–0 | 8–0 | 2015 FIFA Women's World Cup qualification |
| 10. | 13 September 2014 | Arena Lviv, Lviv, Ukraine | Turkey | 4–0 | 8–0 | 2015 FIFA Women's World Cup qualification |
| 11. | 8 March 2016 | Acharnes Stadium, Athens, Greece | Greece | 3–1 | 3–1 | UEFA Women's Euro 2017 qualifying |
| 12. | 7 June 2016 | Arena Lviv, Lviv, Ukraine | Greece | 2–0 | 2–0 | UEFA Women's Euro 2017 qualifying |
| 13. | 19 January 2017 | Century Lotus Stadium, Foshan, China | Myanmar | 2–0 | 4–0 | 2017 Four Nations Tournament |
| 14. | 21 September 2021 | Bannikov Stadium, Kyiv, Ukraine | Turkey | 1–0 | 1–0 | Friendly |
| 15. | 21 October 2021 | Kolos Stadium, Kovalivka, Ukraine | Faroe Islands | 1–0 | 4–0 | 2023 FIFA Women's World Cup qualification |
