= 2001–02 Divizia A (women's football) =

Divizia A Feminin
- Season: 2001–02
- Champions: Regal (2nd title)

The 2001–02 season of the Divizia A Feminin was the 12th season of Romania's premier women's football league. Two divisions (West/South) with 3/4 teams each played a sextuple round robin. First two places in each division qualified to the final tournament (single-leg semifinals and finals).

== Championship play-off ==
=== Semifinals ===
12 July 2002

Regal București	5–0	Clujana

12 July 2002

Şantierul Naval Constanţa	5–0	Motorul Oradea

=== Third Place ===
14 July 2002

Motorul Oradea	3–2	Clujana
Boitos 31' 85'; Tatar 41'		Gal 50' 71'

=== Final ===
14 July 2002

Regal București	2–0	Motorul Oradea
