= Agnieszka Winczo =

Polish footballer (born 1984)

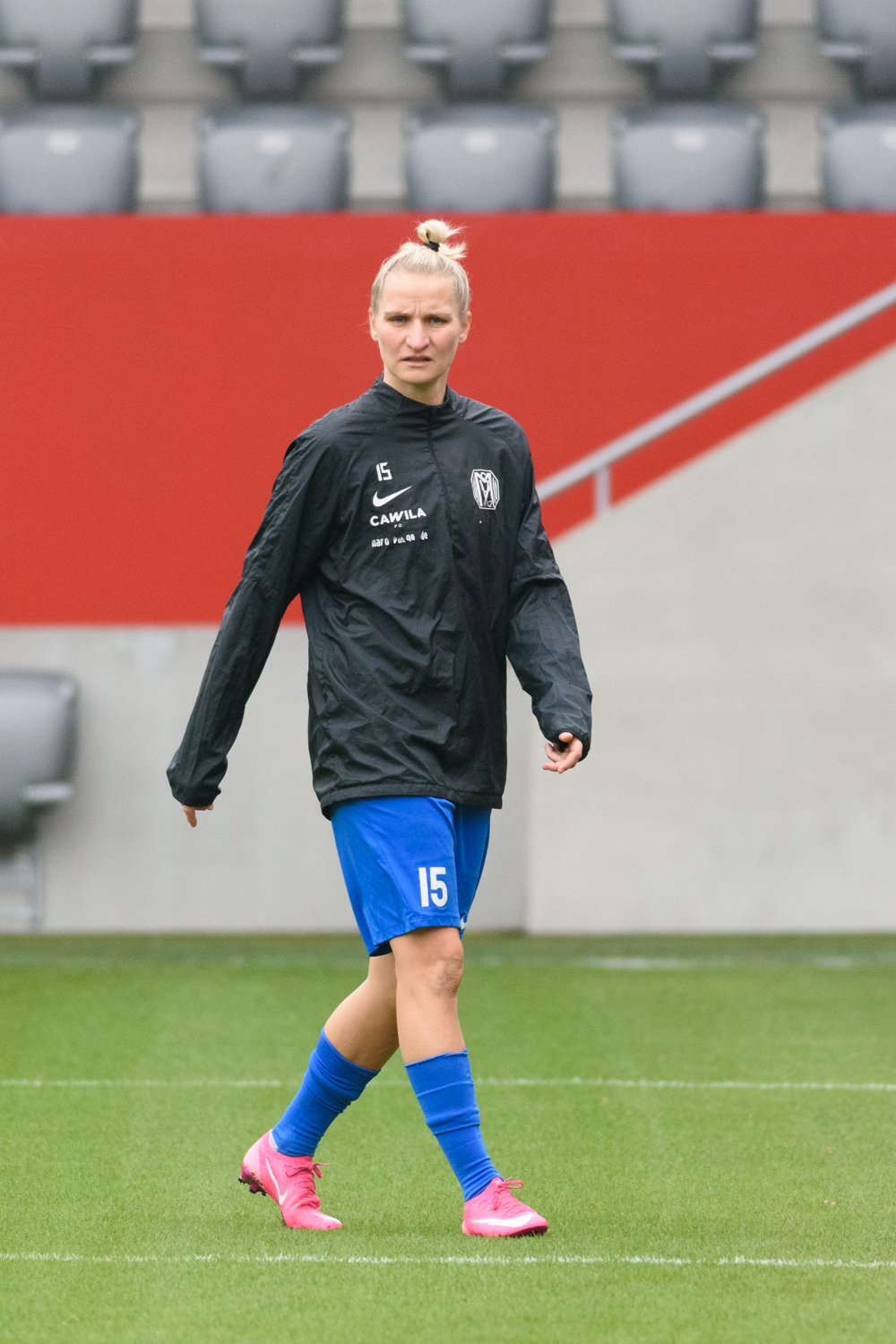
- Winczo with Meppen in 2021

Personal information
- Full name: Agnieszka Winczo
- Date of birth: 24 August 1984 (age 42)
- Place of birth: Częstochowa, Poland
- Height: 1.72 m (5 ft 7 1/2 in)
- Position: Forward

Team information
- Current team: AP Orlen Gdańsk (assistant)

Youth career
- AWF Katowice

Senior career*
Years	Team	Apps	(Gls)
2001–2006	Czarni Sosnowiec		
2006–2008	Gol Częstochowa		(11)
2008–2011	Unia Racibórz		(50)
2011–2019	Cloppenburg	169	(113)
2019–2020	SC Sand	20	(1)
2020–2022	SV Meppen	45	(13)

International career
2004–2020	Poland	109	(37)
- * Club domestic league appearances and goals

Agnieszka Winczo (born 24 August 1984) is a Polish former professional footballer who played as a forward. She is currently the assistant coach of Ekstraliga club AP Orlen Gdańsk.

== Career ==
Winczo plays for SV Meppen in the Frauen-Bundesliga. She previously played for Czarni Sosnowiec, Gol Częstochowa and Unia Racibórz in the Polish Ekstraliga. She was the championship's top scorer in 2011.

Winczo has made several appearances for the Poland women's national football team, including four times in the 2007 FIFA Women's World Cup qualifying rounds. She made her debut in a friendly against Ukraine on 27 March 2004. She has also played for the team in the 2011 FIFA Women's World Cup qualifying rounds, scoring a hat-trick in a 4–1 away victory over Romania on 31 March 2010. She earned her 100th cap for the national team on 5 April 2019 against Italy.

== Career statistics ==
=== International ===
Appearances and goals by national team and year
National team	Year	Apps	Goals
Poland	2004	6	2
Poland	2005	6	1
Poland	2006	2	0
Poland	2007	7	0
Poland	2008	9	2
Poland	2009	11	4
Poland	2010	9	5
Poland	2011	7	8
Poland	2012	7	1
Poland	2013	7	3
Poland	2014	2	1
Poland	2016	2	4
Poland	2017	10	4
Poland	2018	12	1
Poland	2019	8	1
Poland	2020	4	0
Total		109	37

Scores and results list Poland's goal tally first, score column indicates score after each Winczo goal.

List of international goals scored by Agnieszko Winczo
No.	Date	Venue	Opponent	Score	Result	Competition
1	1 May 2004	Dunaújváros, Hungary	Hungary	1–0	2–2	UEFA Women's Euro 2005 qualifying
2	28 May 2008	City Stadium, Kutno, Poland	Austria	1–3	2–4	UEFA Women's Euro 2009 qualifying
3	19 September 2009	Stadion im. Ojca Władysława Augustynka, Nowy Sącz, Poland	Ukraine	1–0	4–1	2011 FIFA Women's World Cup qualification
4	19 September 2009	Stadion im. Ojca Władysława Augustynka, Nowy Sącz, Poland	Ukraine	2–0	4–1	2011 FIFA Women's World Cup qualification
5	19 September 2009	Stadion im. Ojca Władysława Augustynka, Nowy Sącz, Poland	Ukraine	4–0	4–1	2011 FIFA Women's World Cup qualification
6	24 October 2009	Stadion Dyskobolia, Grodzisk Wielkopolski, Poland	Romania	1–0	2–0	2011 FIFA Women's World Cup qualification
7	31 March 2010	Stadionul Mogoşoaia, Mogoşoaia, Romania	Romania	1–0	4–1	2011 FIFA Women's World Cup qualification
8	31 March 2010	Stadionul Mogoşoaia, Mogoşoaia, Romania	Romania	3–1	4–1	2011 FIFA Women's World Cup qualification
9	31 March 2010	Stadionul Mogoşoaia, Mogoşoaia, Romania	Romania	4–1	4–1	2011 FIFA Women's World Cup qualification
10	26 October 2011	Stadion Ludowy, Sosnowiec, Poland	Bosnia and Herzegovina	3–0	4–0	UEFA Women's Euro 2013 qualifying
11	23 November 2011	Stadion Goce Delčev, Prilep, North Macedonia	North Macedonia	1–0	3–0	UEFA Women's Euro 2013 qualifying
12	23 November 2011	Stadion Goce Delčev, Prilep, North Macedonia	North Macedonia	3–0	3–0	UEFA Women's Euro 2013 qualifying
13	20 September 2016	OSiR Włocławek, Włocławek, Poland	Moldova	4–0	4–0	UEFA Women's Euro 2017 qualifying
14	24 November 2017	Loro Boriçi Stadium, Shkodër, Albania	Albania	3–0	4–1	2019 FIFA Women's World Cup qualification
15	24 November 2017	Loro Boriçi Stadium, Shkodër, Albania	Albania	4–0	4–1	2019 FIFA Women's World Cup qualification
16	31 August 2018	Traktor Stadium, Minsk, Belarus	Belarus	1–0	4–1	2019 FIFA Women's World Cup qualification

== Honours ==
Czarni Sosnowiec

- Polish Cup: 2001–02

Unia Racibórz

- Ekstraliga: 2008–09, 2009–10, 2010–11
- Polish Cup: 2009–10, 2010–11

Individual

- Ekstraliga top scorer: 2010–11
- Polish Cup top scorer: 2010–11
