= 2019 Cupa României Final (women's football) =

- The match poster
- Event: 2018–19 Cupa României
Fortuna Becicherecu Mic	Vasas Femina Odorheiu Secuiesc
0	5
- Date: 31 May 2019
- Venue: Stadionul Trans-Sil, Târgu Mureș
- Referee: Iuliana Demetrescu (Râmnicu Vâlcea)
- Attendance: 400

The 2019 Cupa României Final was the 16th Romanian football women's cup final, the final match of the 2018–19 Cupa României. It was played at Stadionul Trans-Sil in Târgu Mureș, on 31 May 2019, contested by Fortuna Becicherecu Mic and Vasas Femina Odorheiu Secuiesc. Vasas Femina won the match 5–0, with a hat-trick from Carolina Țabur and one goal from each Rita Mitri and Krisztina Benő in only the fourth time a team has scored five goals or won by at least a five-goal margin in a cup final. The win brought Vasas its first major trophy, making it only the 7th club to win the Romanian Women's Cup.

== Route to the final ==
Both teams had a similar road to the finals, a clear 8–0 win in the quarterfinals, and a surprising win in the semifinals against opponents they severely lost to in league matches, at just a few days distance.

=== Fortuna Bechicherecu Mic ===
Round	Opposition	Score
2R	Banat Girls Reșița (A)	3–0 (awd.)
3R/R16	Juventus Timișoara (A)	3–0 (awd.)
QF	Heniu Prundu Bârgăului (H)	8–0
SF	U Olimpia Cluj (H)	2–0
Key: (H) = Home venue; (A) = Away venue; (N) = Neutral venue.

The first two matches for Fortuna Becicherecu Mic in the competition were plagued by the inability of the opponents to field enough players on matchday. Scheduled mid-week on 31 October and 21 November, the second and third rounds against Banat Girls Reșița and Juventus Timișoara respectively, were both stopped early in the game at 2–0 for Fortuna, and subsequently awarded 3–0.

The first full match played by Fortuna in the 2018–19 edition of the cup was the quarter-final played at home on 24 March against Heniu Prundu Bârgăului and it finished at a clear and unprecedented 8–0 for Fortuna, although Fortuna were to lose against Heniu 0–1 in the Liga I match played at less than a month distance, on 20 April.

Fortuna met rivals U Olimpia Cluj in the semifinals. The match was played at home on 15 May and was won 2–0, due to the goals scored by Larisa Grigore. With this win, Fortuna became the only Romanian team to ever beat Olimpia twice in the same season, with the first time being on 10 March, in an away Liga I match. Still, Fortuna was to lose against Olimpia 0–7 just 4 days after the cup semifinal, in an away Liga I play-off match.

=== Vasas Femina Odorheiu Secuiesc ===
Round	Opposition	Score
2R	Csiksereda Miercurea Ciuc (A)	9–0
3R/R16	Navobi Iași (A)	4–0
QF	Fair Play București (A)	8–0
SF	Universitatea Galați (A)	4–1
Key: (H) = Home venue; (A) = Away venue; (N) = Neutral venue.

Vasas Femina did not play any of its cup matches at home in this edition.

Its first game was in the 2nd round on 28 October, where it met Csiksereda Miercurea Ciuc which it defeated with a clear 9–0. The third round match was played on 18 November against Navobi Iași and won 4–0, with a hat-trick from Rita Mitri and another goal by Carolina Țabur.

In the quarterfinals, it trashed Fair Play București 8–0 on 27 March, while in the semifinals, Vasas traveled to Galați to play against Universitatea on 15 May and won the game by 4–1, even though they just lost a Liga I match 0–4 against the same team and on the same pitch a week before, on 8 May.

== Pre-game ==
Neither team had won a major trophy before. Vasas previously reached only the semifinals of the Cup in the previous season, while Fortuna's best result was reaching the last 16 in the 2016–17 season. In the league, Vasas were the standing vice-champions, while Fortuna finished the previous Liga I on the eight place, just above the relegation line.

In the Liga I regular season, Fortuna played Vasas earlier in May, at Odorheiu Secuiesc, with Vasas winning 4–1. However, after the end of the regular league season, Fortuna qualified for the Championship play-offs (places 1–3), while Vasas only qualified for the Lower table round (places 4–6).

Both teams organized buses for the fans to attend the final in Târgu Mureș. Just before the kickoff, a ceremony was held, and the local municipal team CSM Târgu Mureș was awarded with the trophy for winning Liga III, Seria III.

== Match ==
=== Team selection ===
Fortuna had a selection of footballers who spent most of their careers in the western part of Romania, notably at CFR Timișoara, who folded in early autumn, meaning that Fortuna had received at the start of the season an influx of new young players who played well with the already existing squad. A notable additional presence was former Romania national team member and top youth national team goalscorer Alexandra Lunca, who joined the team this season. An important absence for Fortuna was goalkeeper Mihaela Durlă, who defended Fortuna's goal for the first part of the season. Youth national team player Bianca Ienovan was uncertain for the match due to a recent injury, but eventually she was benched for the final. Other available players on matchday, that could have been included were Rebeca Pavel (#17) who had been announced for the final, Andrada Rusu (#22) and Cristina Costa (#8), the latter having had injury problems this season.

Vasas had a core of 4 players from the Moldova women's national football team (Violeta Mițul, Nadejda Colesnicenco, Margarita Panova and Carolina Țabur), Romania national youth team star Ana Maria Vlădulescu, in addition to a large base of local homegrown players of Hungarian ethnicity, a lot of which have been previously selected for Romania's youth national squads. Coach Andrași did not field Mădălina Marinescu, who was previously announced for the final.

=== Details ===
31 May 2019
17:00 EEST

Fortuna Becicherecu Mic	0–5	Vasas Femina Odorheiu Secuiesc
	Report	Rita Mitri 23'; Carolina Țabur 27', 50', 60'; Krisztina Benő 56'

Stadionul Trans-Sil, Târgu Mureș
Attendance: 400
Referee: Iuliana Demetrescu (Râmnicu Vâlcea)
Assistants: Roxana Ivanov, Bianca Florea,
Fourth official: Roxana Recorean
Observer: Teodora Albon

Fortuna Becicherecu Mic	Vasas Femina Odorheiu Secuiesc

GK	12	(Romania) Cosmina Roșu
DF	15	(Romania) Denisa Hațegan
DF	7	(Romania) Claudia Bistrian
DF	10	(Romania) Cristina Codrescu (c)
DF	6	(Romania) Denisa Heisu
MF	3	(Romania) Lidia Șuveț	(substituted off) 46'
MF	19	(Romania) Monica Tomesc	(substituted off) 67'
MF	24	(Romania) Cristina Sucilă
MF	11	(Romania) Larisa Grigore
FW	14	(Romania) Alexandra Lunca
FW	23	(Romania) Melisa Șodincă	(substituted off) 77'
Substitutes:
DF	4	(Romania) Sabina Scurtu	(substituted on) 67'
DF	13	(Romania) Oana Stoianov	(substituted on) 77'
DF	18	(Romania) Florina Abrudan
MF	5	(Romania) Anca Dobai
FW	9	(Romania) Mariana Voinea	(substituted on) 46'
FW	16	(Romania) Bianca Ienovan
FW	20	(Romania) Teodora Țirtea
Managers:
(Romania) Florin Pădurean (Romania) Andra Vela

GK	1	(Romania) Linda Kajtár (c)
DF	5	(Romania) Péter Kata	(substituted off) 71'
DF	6	(Romania) Anita Kis
DF	3	(Romania) Brigitta Szász-Bencze
DF	13	(Moldova) Violeta Mițul
MF	17	(Moldova) Nadejda Colesnicenco
MF	18	(Romania) Kinga Barabási
MF	8	(Romania) Krisztina Benő
MF	10	(Romania) Ana Maria Vlădulescu
CF	11	(Moldova) Carolina Țabur	(substituted off) 81'
CF	9	(Romania) Rita Mitri	(substituted off) 86'
Substitutes:
GK		(Romania) Barbara Sándor
		(Romania) Anna Bíró
	14	(Romania) Viktória Balázs	(substituted on) 71'
DF	4	(Romania) Tímea Krall	(substituted on) 86'
		(Romania) Dakó Katalin
	15	(Romania) Márta Dávid	(substituted on) 81'
FW		(Moldova) Margarita Panova
Manager:
(Romania) Sandu Andrași

Match rules

- 90 minutes
- 30 minutes of extra time if necessary
- Penalty shoot-out if scores still level
- Seven named substitutes
- Maximum of three substitutions, with a fourth allowed in extra time

== Post-match ==
Vasas won its first major trophy after 7 years of existence, becoming the 7th team to win the Cupa României. However, the team finished the League in 6th place. On the other hand, after this severe defeat, Fortuna went on to also become league vice-champions.
