= 2005–06 Cupa României (women's football) =

Cupa României 2006

Tournament details
- Country: Romania

Final positions
- Champions: Clujana (3rd title)
- Runners-up: Pandurii

The 2005–06 Cupa României was the 3rd annual Romanian women's football knockout tournaments.

== Quarter-finals ==
12 April 2006

Smart Sport București	v	Şantierul Naval Constanţa

12 April 2006

Pandurii	v	CSS Târgoviște

12 April 2006

City US Târgu Mureș	v	Clujana

29 April 2006

Ripensia 2000 Timișoara	1–4	Motorul Oradea
Sas 17'		Boros 15' 30'; Crâşmariu 80'; Grosu 87'

== Semi-finals ==
3 May 2006

Clujana	5–0	Motorul Oradea

3 May 2006

Şantierul Naval Constanţa	0–3	Pandurii

== Final ==
31 May 2006

Clujana	3–2	Pandurii
Florentina Spanu; Andreea Laiu; Cristina Sucila
