= 2003–04 Divizia A (women's football) =

Divizia A Feminin
- Season: 2003–04
- Champions: CFF Clujana (2nd title)

The 2003–04 season of the Divizia A Feminin was the 14th season of Romania's premier women's football league. CFF Clujana won the championship.

== Standings ==
Pos	Team	Pld	W	D	L	GF	GA	GD	Pts	Qualification
1	CFF Clujana (C)	12	9	2	1	75	22	+53	29	2004–05 UEFA Women's Cup Qualifying round
2	Crişul Aleşd	12	7	2	3	36	30	+6	23	
3	Pandurii Lignitul Târgu Jiu	12	5	2	5	14	16	−2	17	

Source: Anuarul Sportului 2004 (page 417) (in Romanian)
Rules for classification: 1) points; 2) goal difference; 3) number of goals scored.
(C) Champions
