= Florentina Spânu =

Romanian footballer (born 1985)

Florentina Olar-Spânu
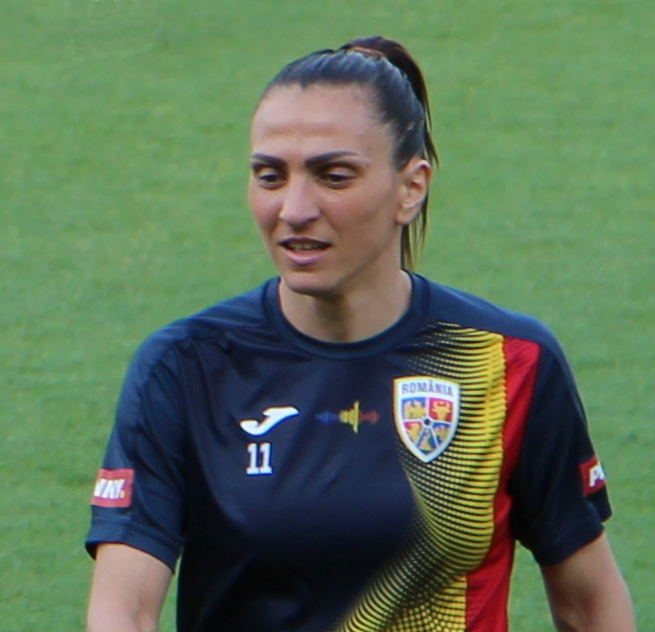

Personal information
- Full name: Florentina Olar-Spânu
- Birth name: Florentina Spânu
- Date of birth: 6 August 1985 (age 41)
- Place of birth: Constanța, Romania
- Position: Forward

Team information
- Current team: Fortuna Hjørring
- Number: 11

Senior career*
Years	Team	Apps	(Gls)
2001–2009	Clujana		
2008–2009	→ Lazio	13	(4)
2009–2013	Apollon Limassol		
2013–2019	Fortuna Hjørring	30	(7)
2019–2021	Nordsjælland	43	(9)
2021–	Fortuna Hjørring	69	(11)

International career
2001–	Romania	180	(23)
- * Club domestic league appearances and goals as of 19 May 2025

Florentina Olar-Spânu (née Spânu; born 6 August 1985) is a Romanian footballer who plays as a forward for Danish A-Liga club Fortuna Hjørring and the Romania women's national team.

== Career ==
Spânu has been a member of the Romanian national team from the beginning of her career, having made her debut in September 2001, in a tie 2003 FIFA World Cup qualifier against Croatia. She played for Clujana, which dominated the Romanian First League throughout the decade, until 2009 when she moved abroad. Following a short stint in the Italian Serie A with Lazio, she signed for Apollon Limassol. In 2013 she accompanied compatriot Laura Rus in signing for Fortuna Hjørring in Denmark's Elitedivisionen, with which she has reached the UEFA Champions League quarterfinals.

== Personal life ==
Spânu is married and has a son with her husband.

== Career statistics ==
=== International goals ===
No.	Date	Venue	Opponent	Score	Result	Competition
1.	30 September 2001	Osijek, Croatia	Croatia	1–0	2–2	2003 FIFA Women's World Cup qualification
2.	13 October 2001	Câmpina, Romania	Estonia	1–0	6–1	2003 FIFA Women's World Cup qualification
3.	13 October 2001	Câmpina, Romania	Estonia	6–0	6–1	2003 FIFA Women's World Cup qualification
4.	9 June 2002	Pärnu, Estonia	Estonia	6–1	6–1	2003 FIFA Women's World Cup qualification
5.	10 August 2003	Bucharest, Romania	Malta	2–0	3–0	UEFA Women's Euro 2005 qualifying
6.	12 October 2003	Câmpina, Romania	Romania	1–0	2–0	UEFA Women's Euro 2005 qualifying
7.	18 October 2003	Belišće, Croatia	Croatia	1–0	3–2	UEFA Women's Euro 2005 qualifying
8.	1 May 2004	Bucharest, Romania	Republic of Ireland	1–1	1–1	UEFA Women's Euro 2005 qualifying
9.	8 May 2004	Hamrun, Malta	Malta	2–0	9–0	UEFA Women's Euro 2005 qualifying
10.	2 October 2004	Otopeni, Romania	Croatia	10–0	10–0	UEFA Women's Euro 2005 qualifying
11.	20 August 2005	Senec, Slovakia	Slovakia	1–0	1–2	2007 FIFA Women's World Cup qualification
12.	29 October 2005	Mogoșoaia, Romania	Northern Ireland	2–0	3–2	2007 FIFA Women's World Cup qualification
13.	18 November 2006	Mogoșoaia, Romania	Azerbaijan	1–0	4–1	UEFA Women's Euro 2009 qualifying
14.	23 November 2006	Mogoșoaia, Romania	Estonia	1–0	5–0	UEFA Women's Euro 2009 qualifying
15.	5 May 2007	Debrecen, Hungary	Hungary	1–0	3–3	UEFA Women's Euro 2009 qualifying
16.	24 May 2008	Buftea, Romania	Italy	1–2	1–6	UEFA Women's Euro 2009 qualifying
17.	28 May 2008	Oradea, Romania	Hungary	2–1	3–1	UEFA Women's Euro 2009 qualifying
18.	23 September 2009	Buftea, Romania	Bosnia and Herzegovina	4–0	4–0	2011 FIFA Women's World Cup qualification
19.	25 August 2010	Mogoșoaia, Romania	Hungary	1–2	2–3	2011 FIFA Women's World Cup qualification
20.	21 August 2014	Mogoșoaia, Romania	North Macedonia	6–1	6–1	2015 FIFA Women's World Cup qualification
21.	17 September 2014	Iași, Romania	Estonia	1–0	2–0	2015 FIFA Women's World Cup qualification
22.	17 September 2014	Iași, Romania	Estonia	2–0	2–0	2015 FIFA Women's World Cup qualification
23.	27 November 2014	Katerini, Greece	Greece	3–1	3–1	UEFA Women's Euro 2017 qualifying
24.	12 July 2024	Almaty, Kazakhstan	Kazakhstan	2–0	3–0	UEFA Women's Euro 2025 qualifying
25.	30 May 2025	Ovidiu, Romania	Bosnia and Herzegovina	1–0	2–0	2025 UEFA Women's Nations League

== Honours ==
=== Club ===
CFF Clujana

- Romanian First League (7): 2002–03, 2003–04, 2004–05, 2005–06, 2006–07, 2007–08, 2008–09
- Romanian Cup (4): 2003–04, 2004–05, 2005–06, 2007–08

Apollon Limassol

- Cypriot First Division (4): 2009–10, 2010–11, 2011–12, 2012–13
- Cypriot Cup (4): 2009–10, 2010–11, 2011–12, 2012–13

Fortuna Hjørring

- Danish Women's League (4): 2013–14, 2015–16, 2017–18, 2024–25
- Danish Cup (5): 2015–16, 2018–19, 2019–20, 2021–22, 2024–25

=== Individual ===
- Romanian Footballer of the Year: 2015
