= 1991–92 Divizia A (women's football) =

Divizia A Feminin
- Season: 1991–92
- Champions: CFR Craiova (1st title)
- Relegated: Unirea Tricolor București, Voința CFR Ploiești, Felix FCE București

The 1991–92 season of the Divizia A Feminin was the 2nd season of Romania's premier women's football league. CFR Craiova won the championship.

== Standings ==
Pos	Team	Pld	W	D	L	GF	GA	GD	Pts	Qualification or relegation
1	CFR Craiova (C)	22	20	2	0	76	12	+64	42	Champions of Romania
2	ICIM Brașov	22	19	2	1	116	11	+105	40	
3	Rapid Oradea	22	12	2	8	41	31	+10	26	
4	Zimbrul Suceava	22	12	2	8	31	23	+8	26	
5	Confecția Victoria Botoșani	22	12	0	10	40	39	+1	24	
6	Dunărea Giurgiu	22	9	5	8	39	42	−3	23	
7	Olimpia Baia Mare	22	9	2	11	27	36	−9	20	
8	CFR Voința Iași	22	8	3	11	34	45	−11	19	
9	Răsunetul Bistrița	22	5	4	13	22	40	−18	14	
10	Unirea Tricolor București (R)	22	6	1	15	28	48	−20	13	Relegation to Divizia B
11	Voința CFR Ploiești (R)	22	5	2	15	30	58	−28	12	Relegation to Divizia B
12	Felix FCE București (R)	22	1	3	18	14	113	−99	5	Relegation to Divizia B

Rules for classification: 1) Points; 2) Goal difference; 3) Number of goals scored.
(C) Champions; (R) Relegated
