= 2009–10 Liga I (women's football) =

Liga I Feminin
- Season: 2009–10
- Champions: Târgu Mureş (1st title)
- Matches: 131

The 2009–10 season of the Liga I Feminin was the 20th season of Romania's premier women's football league. ASA Târgu Mureş won the championship.

== Standings ==
Pos	Team	Pld	W	D	L	GF	GA	GD	Pts	Qualification
1	ASA Târgu Mureş (C)	22	21	0	1	162	11	+151	63	2010–11 UEFA Champions League Qualifying round
2	Sporting Craiova	22	19	1	2	108	14	+94	58	
3	CFF Clujana	22	17	1	4	102	23	+79	52	
4	Motorul Oradea	22	13	1	8	56	44	+12	40	
5	SMART București	22	12	2	8	52	36	+16	38	
6	Târgovişte	22	12	1	9	71	38	+33	37	
7	Metalul Vlăhiţa	22	10	2	10	44	51	−7	32	
8	Alice & Tunes Piteşti	22	8	0	14	38	86	−48	24	
9	Şantierul Naval Constanţa	22	7	0	15	34	92	−58	21	
10	Fair Play București	22	5	1	16	31	97	−66	16	
11	Inter Smef Sibiu	21	2	1	18	14	100	−86	7	
12	CS Intercredo Piteşti	21	0	0	21	1	121	−120	0	

Updated to match(es) played on 6 June 2010. Source: frfotbal.ro (in Romanian) and rsssf
Rules for classification: 1) points; 2) goal difference; 3) number of goals scored.
(C) Champions
