= CFF Clujana =

Romanian football club

- Full name: Clubul de Fotbal Feminin Clujana Cluj-Napoca
- Short name: Clujana
- Founded: 2001
- Dissolved: 2012
- Ground: Stadionul Clujana, Cluj-Napoca
- Capacity: 2,000
- 2011-12: Liga I, Seria Vest, 8th (16th overall)
Home colours	Away colours

CFF Clujana was an association football club from Cluj-Napoca in Romania. Clujana's women's football team played in the top domestic league and has won seven consecutive Romanian national championships and four domestic cups.

== History ==
CFF Clujana was founded in 2001 by the businessman Florin Chelaru in collaboration with Mirel and Teodora Albon. The team manages to win its first title in 2003 and proceeded to establish itself as the most successful Romanian women's football team of the 2000s, being champions for seven consecutive years between 2003 and 2009, and winning four Romanian Cups.

In 2009, the coach, Mirel Albon, the brain behind the team's success, left the club due to increasingly divergent views with Chelaru. Next year, Albon proceeded to form his own club, taking with him a significant part of Clujana's top players. In the two seasons that followed, rivals Olimpia won the title, while Clujana finished in the bottom part of the championship.

The women's football side ceased in 2012. The parent club was still active in 2018, having a male futsal team since 2005 under the same name CFF Clujana, even though CFF is short for "Women's Football Club", as Chelaru did not bother to officially change the name.

The full name of the club is "Clubul de Fotbal Feminin Clujana Cluj-Napoca", or CFF Clujana Cluj-Napoca. For a while, it was known as CFF Clujana Protherm Cluj-Napoca for sponsorship reasons.

== Honours ==
=== Leagues ===
- Liga I
  - Winners (7): 2002–03, 2003–04, 2004–05, 2005–06, 2006–07, 2007–08, 2008–09

=== Cups ===
- Romanian Women's Cup
  - Winners (4): 2003–04, 2004–05, 2005–06, 2007–08
  - Runners-up (2): 2006–07, 2009–10

== Season by season ==
Champions Runners-up Third place Promoted Relegated

Season		Division	Tier	Place	Cup	WCL
1	2001–02	Divizia A	1	4th	–	–
2	2002–03	Divizia A	1	1st	–	–
3	2003–04	Divizia A	1	1st	W	2Grp
4	2004–05	Divizia A	1	1st	W	1Grp
5	2005–06	Divizia A	1	1st	W	1Grp
6	2006–07	Liga I	1	1st	F	1Grp
7	2007–08	Liga I	1	1st	W	1Grp
8	2008–09	Liga I	1	1st	SF	1Grp
9	2009–10	Liga I	1	3rd	F	Grp
10	2010–11	Liga I	1	9th	1R	–
11	2011–12	Liga I, Seria Vest	1	16th	R16	–

== Notable former players ==
- (Romania) Teodora Albon
- (Romania) Mara Bâtea
- (Romania) Georgiana Birțoiu
- (Romania) Ioana Bortan
- (Romania) Cosmina Dușa
- (Romania) Maria Ficzay
- (Romania) Adina Giurgiu
- (Romania) Daniela Gurz
- (Romania) Andreea Laiu
- (Romania) Corina Olar
- (Romania) Elena Pavel
- (Romania) Florentina Spânu
- (Romania) Raluca Sârghe
- (Romania) Ștefania Vătafu
- (Romania) Andreea Voicu
