= 2010–11 Liga I (women's football) =

Liga I Feminin
- Season: 2010–11
- Champions: Olimpia Cluj (1st title)
- Champions League: Olimpia Cluj
- Matches: 156
- Goals: 906 (5.81 per match)
- Top goalscorer: Cosmina Duşa
- Biggest home win: Olimpia Cluj 27–0 Fair Play București (8 May 2011)
- Biggest away win: Alice & Tunes Piteşti 0–19 Olimpia Cluj (24 October 2010)
- Highest scoring: Olimpia Cluj 27–0 Fair Play București (8 May 2011)
- Longest winning run: 24 games Olimpia Cluj (whole season)

The 2010–11 season of the Liga I Feminin was the 21st season of Romania's premier women's football league. The season started on 18 September 2010 and ended on 12 June 2011. Olimpia Cluj won the championship in its first season. Olimpia's striker Cosmina Duşa scored over 100 goals this season.

== Teams ==
Inter Sibiu and Intercredo Piteşti withdrew form the championship after the end of the last season. New teams entered the first league: Olimpia Cluj, Real Craiova, CS Brazi and FC Nicolae Dobrin. After the first round Smart Sport București withdrew due to financial problems. Another team that withdrew, but after the half season, was FC Nicolae Dobrin. They lost all their remaining matches with 3–0.

=== Stadia and locations ===
Location of clubs in Liga I feminin 2010–11

Club	City	Stadium	Capacity
Alice & Tunes	Piteşti	Nicolae Dobrin (artificial turf)	1,000
Brazi	Brazi	Brazi de Sus	1,000
Clujana	Cluj-Napoca	Clujana	2,000
Fair Play	București	Politehnica	1,000
Metalul	Vlăhiţa	Metalul	1,000
Motorul	Oradea	Motorul	1,000
Nicolae Dobrin	Piteşti	Nicolae Dobrin (artificial turf)	1,000
Olimpia	Cluj-Napoca	Ardealul	1,000
Real	Craiova	Electroputere	2,000
Sporting	Craiova	Electroputere	2,000
Şantierul Naval	Constanţa	SNC	1,000
Târgovişte	Târgovişte	Toma Panţu	1,000
Târgu Mureş	Târgu Mureş	Trans-Sil	8,000

== Standings ==
Pos	Team	Pld	W	D	L	GF	GA	GD	Pts	Qualification
1	Olimpia Cluj (C)	24	24	0	0	253	11	+242	72	2011–12 UEFA Champions League Qualifying round
2	Târgu Mureş	24	21	1	2	167	23	+144	64	
3	Real Craiova	24	16	2	6	96	25	+71	50	
4	Brazi	24	15	2	7	56	52	+4	47	
5	Sporting Craiova	24	11	3	10	72	69	+3	36	
6	Motorul Oradea	24	11	6	7	50	54	−4	36 (Note: The Disciplinary Board of the FRF deducted 3 points from Motorul Oradea.)	
7	Metalul Vlăhiţa	24	9	3	12	29	67	−38	30	
8	Târgovişte	24	8	2	14	50	80	−30	26	
9	CFF Clujana	24	8	2	14	37	85	−48	26	
10	Alice & Tunes Piteşti	24	6	5	13	26	80	−54	23	
11	Nicolae Dobrin	24	4	3	17	25	60	−35	15	
12	Fair Play București	24	4	2	18	29	138	−109	14	
13	Şantierul Naval Constanţa	24	2	3	19	16	162	−146	9	

Updated to match(es) played on 12 June 2011. Source: frfotbal.ro (in Romanian)
Rules for classification: 1) points; 2) goal difference; 3) number of goals scored.
(C) Champions
