= 2005–06 Divizia A (women's football) =

Divizia A Feminin
- Season: 2005–06
- Champions: CFF Clujana (4th title)

The 2005–06 season of the Divizia A Feminin was the 16th season of Romania's premier women's football league. Two divisions (West/South) with four teams each played a double round robin. First two places in each division qualified in the Championship play-off (4 teams playing a single round-robin). Clujana won the title.

== Championship play-off ==
1. CFF Clujana (champion 2006–07 UEFA Women's Cup Qualifying round)
2. Pandurii Lignitul Târgu Jiu
3. CSS Târgovişte
4. Motorul Oradea
