= Patrycja Pożerska =

Polish footballer

Personal information
- Full name: Patrycja Pożerska
- Date of birth: 12 July 1984 (age 42)
- Place of birth: Poland
- Position: Forward

Senior career*
Years	Team	Apps	(Gls)
2001–2010	AZS Wrocław		
2010–2012	Unia Racibórz		
2013	SV Bardenbach	11	(4)
2013	Blau-Weiß Hohen Neuendorf	9	(4)
2014	MSV Duisburg	11	(0)
2014	Zagłębie Lubin		
2015–2018	Blau-Weiß Hohen Neuendorf	50	(21)

International career
- Poland U18
2001–2016	Poland	84	(23)
- * Club domestic league appearances and goals

Patrycja Pożerska (born 12 July 1984) is a Polish former footballer who played as a forward.

She made 84 appearances and scored 23 goals for the Poland national team.

== Career statistics ==
=== International ===
Appearances and goals by national team and year
National team	Year	Apps	Goals
Poland	2001	6	1
Poland	2002	6	1
Poland	2003	5	0
Poland	2004	6	2
Poland	2005	7	3
Poland	2006	4	0
Poland	2007	8	3
Poland	2008	8	0
Poland	2009	10	3
Poland	2010	9	3
Poland	2011	2	1
Poland	2013	8	6
Poland	2014	4	0
Poland	2016	1	0
Total		84	23

== Honours ==
AWF Wrocław

- Ekstraliga: 2001–02, 2002–03, 2003–04, 2004–05, 2005–06, 2006–07, 2007–08
- Polish Cup: 2002–03, 2003–04, 2006–07, 2008–09

Unia Racibórz

- Ekstraliga: 2010–11, 2011–12
- Polish Cup: 2010–11, 2011–12
