= Rita Méry =

Hungarian footballer

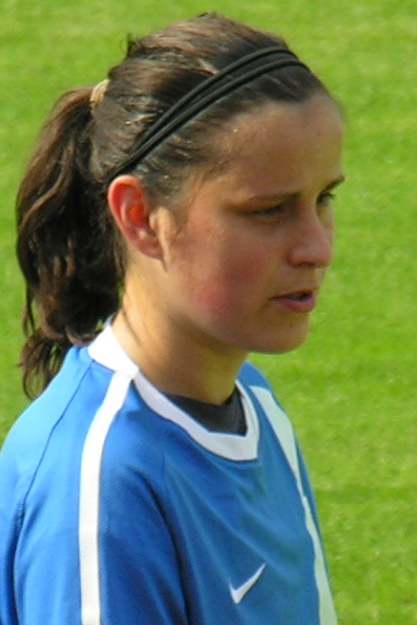

Personal information
- Full name: Rita Méry
- Date of birth: 22 August 1984 (age 42)
- Place of birth: Veszprém, Hungary
- Position: Striker

Senior career*
Years	Team	Apps	(Gls)
- MTK

International career^{‡}
2004–	Hungary	35	(7)
- * Club domestic league appearances and goals ‡ National team caps and goals as of 23 May 2012

Rita Méry is a Hungarian football striker currently playing in the Hungarian First Division for MTK Hungária, with whom she has also played the Champions League. She is a member of the Hungarian national team.
