= Andreea Laiu =

Romanian footballer (born 1986)

Personal information
- Full name: Andreea Laiu
- Date of birth: 15 March 1986 (age 40)
- Place of birth: Romania
- Height: 1.67 m (5 ft 6 in)
- Positions: Midfielder; forward

Team information
- Current team: Kiryat Gat

Senior career*
Years	Team	Apps	(Gls)
2004–2009	CFF Clujana		
2009–2013	Apollon Limassol		
2014	Amazon Grimstad	21	(5)
2015	WFC Rossiyanka	8	(1)
2015	Fylkir	8	(1)
2015–	Kiryat Gat		

International career
2004–2014	Romania		
- * Club domestic league appearances and goals

Andreea Laiu (born 15 March 1986) is a Romanian football midfielder or striker who plays for Kiryat Gat. She previously played for Apollon Limassol of Cyprus' First Division.

For ten years she was a member of the Romania national team, but was not called up after 2014.
