= Donata Leśnik =

Polish footballer

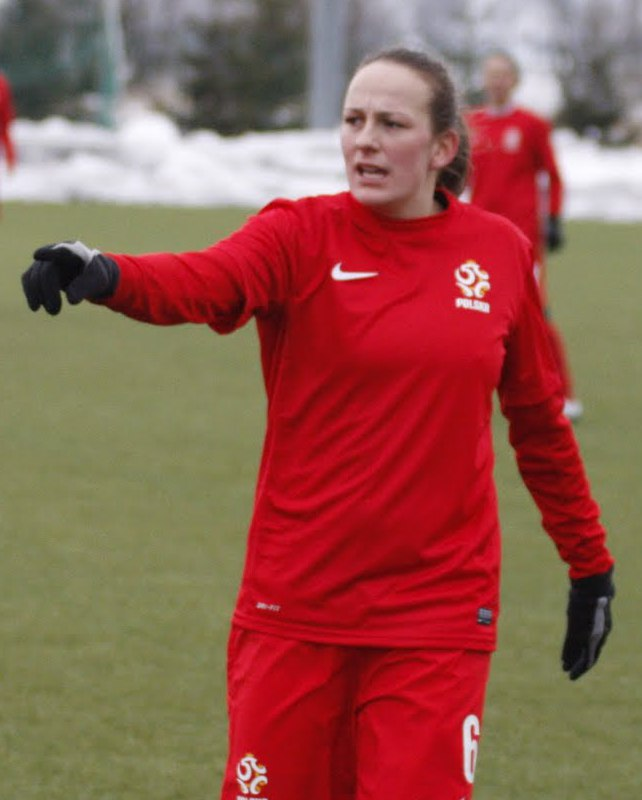
- Leśnik with Poland in 2013

Personal information
- Full name: Donata Leśnik
- Date of birth: 31 March 1991 (age 35)
- Place of birth: Poland
- Position: Defender

Senior career*
| Years | Team | Apps | (Gls) |
| –2011 | Medyk Konin | | |
| 2011–2014 | Unia Racibórz | | |

International career
| | Poland U17 | 6 | (0) |
| | Poland U19 | 6 | (0) |
| 2009–2014 | Poland | 35 | (2) |
- * Club domestic league appearances and goals

Donata Leśnik (born 31 March 1991) is a Polish former footballer who played as a defender. In her career, she represented Medyk Konin and Unia Racibórz.

She scored in Poland's first game in the 2011 World Cup qualifying against Ukraine.

== Career statistics ==
=== International ===
Appearances and goals by national team and year
| National team | Year | Apps | Goals |
|---|---|---|---|
| Poland | 2009 | 5 | 1 |
| Poland | 2010 | 8 | 0 |
| Poland | 2011 | 6 | 0 |
| Poland | 2012 | 7 | 1 |
| Poland | 2013 | 7 | 0 |
| Poland | 2014 | 2 | 0 |
| Total | | 35 | 2 |

== Honours ==
Unia Racibórz

- Ekstraliga: 2011–12, 2012–13
- Polish Cup: 2011–12
