= 2006–07 Liga I (women's football) =

Liga I Feminin
- Season: 2006–07
- Champions: CFF Clujana (5th title)

The 2006–07 season of the Liga I Feminin was the 17th season of Romania's premier women's football league. Clujana won the title.

== Standings ==
Pos	Team	Pld	W	D	L	GF	GA	GD	Pts	Qualification
1	CFF Clujana (C)	16	15	0	1	106	6	+100	45	2007–08 UEFA Women's Cup Qualifying round
2	Pandurii Lignitul Târgu Jiu	16	13	1	2	79	19	+60	40	
3	CSS Târgovişte	16	11	1	4	54	13	+41	34	
4	Motorul Oradea	16	9	1	6	43	30	+13	28	
5	Smart București	16	8	1	7	42	37	+5	25	
6	AS CITY'US Târgu Mureş	16	5	0	11	32	56	−24	15	
7	CFR Constanţa	16	4	1	11	18	53	−35	13	
8	Ripensia Timişoara	16	2	1	13	26	90	−64	7	
9	Negrea Reşiţa	18	2	0	16	12	108	−96	6	

Rules for classification: 1) points; 2) goal difference; 3) number of goals scored.
(C) Champions
