= Liga I (women's football) =

- Founded: 1990 as Divizia A 2006 as Liga I 2013 as Superliga; 2017 as Liga I
- Country: Romania
- Confederation: UEFA
- Number of clubs: 8
- Level on pyramid: 1
- Relegation to: Liga II
- Domestic cup: Romanian Women's Cup
- International cup(s): UEFA Champions League; UEFA Women's Europa Cup
- Current champions: Farul Constanța (3rd title) (2025–26)
- Most championships: U Olimpia Cluj (12 titles)
- Broadcaster(s): Pro Arena,Voyo
- Website: frfotbal.ro
- Current: 2026–27 Liga I

The Liga I is the top level women's football league in Romania. The champion team qualifies for UEFA Women's Champions League.

After the fall of communism, organised women's football started to take off, and the founded clubs were distributed into 2 leagues - Divizia A with 12 teams and Divizia B with 30 teams grouped into 3 series, following a tournament called Cupa Libertății. In 2006, the league was rebranded as Liga I along with its male counterparts, since the name Divizia A was found to already be trademarked.

The top league was renamed Superliga for 4 seasons between the 2013–14 season, when the league-system was restructured, and until the 2016–17 season. Between these seasons, the name Liga I was given to the second-tier league.

== Format ==
The league started with 12 teams at its creation in 1990. It has suffered various format changes since. In some years, a play-off was held to decide the champion. For the 2011–2012 season, the league was split into East and West divisions. Teams played each other twice with the top two teams advancing to the championship round. In 2012–13 the teams were split into three divisions, after which the top two teams each advanced to the championship round. Points from the regular season were reset to zero for that round. Starting from 2013 to 2014 and until 2015–16 eight teams played each other twice- and the top four teams played the championship play-off, while the bottom four played a relegation play-off. The last two places in the relegation play-off got relegated. For 2016–17 the league was expanded to 10 teams, with no play-off. A play-off was reintroduced in the 2018–19 season, but since the 2019–20 season the league was expanded to 12 teams, dropping the play-off altogether.

Due to the 2019–20 edition being frozen halfway thanks to the 2019-20 coronavirus pandemic, no teams were supposed to be relegated and the league was planned to be temporarily expanded to 14 teams for the 2020–21 season. However, as two teams withdrew after the initial program was announced since they were unable to comply with medical protocol, a new draw was performed on 26 August 2020. Along with this new draw, a decision was made to change the play system: the remaining 12 teams will play a single round-robin for the regular season, after which the first six will enter a double round-robin play-off to decide the champion, while the remaining teams (six) will enter a double round-robin play-out to decide the relegated teams.

== Winners ==
The following is a list of all Romanian women's top football league winners. The national champion is presented with the Romanian League trophy, and the top three teams currently receive gold, silver and bronze medals from the Romanian Football Federation.

Ed.	Season	Champions	Runner-up	Third place	No. Teams	System
1	1990–91 Divizia A	ICIM Brașov			12	
2	1991–92 Divizia A	CFR Craiova	ICIM Brașov	Rapid Oradea	12	
3	1992–93 Divizia A	ICIM Brașov				
4	1993–94 Divizia A	Fartec Brașov				
5	1994–95 Divizia A	Fartec Brașov				
6	1995–96 Divizia A	Interindustrial Oradea				
7	1996–97 Divizia A	Motorul Oradea				
8	1997–98 Divizia A	Motorul Oradea				
9	1998–99 Divizia A	Conpet Ploiești				
10	1999–2000 Divizia A	Conpet Ploiești				
11	2000–01 Divizia A	Regal București			7	
12	2001–02 Divizia A	Regal București	Șantierul Naval Constanța	Motorul Oradea	7	2 divisions (West/South) with 3/4 teams each- playing a double round robin. First two places in each division qualify to the final tournament (single-leg semifinals and finals).
13	2002–03 Divizia A	Clujana Cluj	Șantierul Naval Constanța	Smart Sport Bucharest	8	2 divisions (West/South) with 4 teams each- playing a sextuple round robin. First two places in each division qualify to the final tournament (single-leg semifinals and finals).
14	2003–04 Divizia A	Clujana Cluj	Crișul Aleșd	Pandurii Târgu Jiu		
15	2004–05 Divizia A	Clujana Cluj	Pandurii Târgu Jiu	Motorul Oradea		
16	2005–06 Divizia A	Clujana Cluj	Pandurii Târgu Jiu	CSȘ Târgoviște	8	2 divisions (West/South) with 4 teams each- playing a double round robin. First two places in each division qualify in the Championship play-off (4 teams playing a single round-robin).
17	2006–07 Liga I	Clujana Cluj	Pandurii Târgu Jiu	CSȘ Târgoviște	9	Double round-robin. First 4 teams qualify in the Championship play-off (single round-robin).
18	2007–08 Liga I	Clujana Cluj	CSȘ Târgoviște	Smart Sport Bucharest	8	Double round-robin.
19	2008–09 Liga I	Clujana Cluj	Ripensia Timișoara	CSȘ Târgoviște	12	Double round-robin.
20	2009–10 Liga I	FCM Târgu Mureş	Sporting Craiova	Clujana Cluj	12	Double round-robin.
21	2010–11 Liga I	Olimpia Cluj	FCM Târgu Mureş	Real Craiova	13	Double round-robin.
22	2011–12 Liga I	Olimpia Cluj	FCM Târgu Mureş	Real Craiova	20	2 divisions (East/West) with 10 teams each- playing a double round robin. First two places in each division qualify in the Championship play-off (4 teams playing a double round-robin).
23	2012–13 Liga I	Olimpia Cluj	FCM Târgu Mureş	CFR Timișoara	18	3 divisions (East/West/South) with 6 teams each- playing a double round robin. First two places in each division qualify in the Championship play-off (6 teams playing a double round-robin). Third place in each division qualifies in the Superliga qualification play-off (3 teams playing a double round-robin). Last two places in each division qualify in the play-out (2 Groups of 4 teams playing a double round-robin).
24	2013–14 Superliga	Olimpia Cluj	FCM Târgu Mureş	Real Craiova	8	Double round-robin. First 4 teams qualify for the Championship play-off (double round robin), while the last 4 teams play in the Relegation play-off (double round-robin).
25	2014–15 Superliga	Olimpia Cluj	ASA Târgu Mureş	Heniu Prundu Bârgăului	8	Double round-robin. First 4 teams qualify for the Championship play-off (double round robin), while the last 4 teams play in the Relegation play-off (double round-robin).
26	2015–16 Superliga	Olimpia Cluj	ASA Târgu Mureş	Navobi Iași	8	Double round-robin. First 4 teams qualify for the Championship play-off (double round robin), while the last 4 teams play in the Relegation play-off (double round-robin).
27	2016–17 Superliga	Olimpia Cluj	Navobi Iași	CFR Timișoara	10	Double round-robin.
28	2017–18 Liga I	Olimpia Cluj	Vasas Femina Odorhei	CFR Timișoara	10	Double round-robin.
29	2018–19 Liga I	U Olimpia Cluj	Fortuna Becicherecu Mic	Heniu Prundu Bârgăului	10	Double round-robin. First 3 teams qualify for the Championship play-off (double round robin), next 3 teams qualify for a mid-table tournament (double round-robin), while the remaining teams play in the play-out (double round-robin).
30	2019–20 Liga I	U Olimpia Cluj (Note: 1st place after regular season, not crowned as Champions due to incomplete season)	Universitatea Galați	Fortuna Becicherecu Mic	12	Double round-robin planned, but only single round-robin completed due to the 2019-20 coronavirus pandemic. First place team not counted as champions.
31	2020–21 Liga I	U Olimpia Cluj	Heniu Prundu Bârgăului	Piroș Security Lioness Arad	12	Originally drawn as a double round-robin for 14 teams. Format changed to a 12 team single round-robin regular season. Top 6 teams qualify for the Championship play-off (double round robin), bottom 6 teams play in the play-out (double round-robin).
32	2021–22 Liga I	U Olimpia Cluj	Heniu Prundu Bârgăului	Politehnica Femina	12	Single round-robin regular season. Top 6 teams qualify for the Championship play-off (double round robin), bottom 6 teams play in the play-out (double round-robin).
33	2022–23 Liga I	U Olimpia Cluj	Politehnica Timișoara	Carmen București	12	Single round-robin regular season. Top 6 teams qualify for the Championship play-off (double round robin), bottom 6 teams play in the play-out (double round-robin).
34	2023–24 Liga I	Farul Constanța	U Olimpia Cluj	Csíkszereda MC	8	Single round-robin regular season. Top 4 teams qualify for the Championship play-off (double round robin), bottom 4 teams play in the play-out (double round-robin).
35	2024–25 Liga I	Farul Constanța	Csíkszereda MC	AS FC Universitatea Cluj	8	Single round-robin regular season. Top 4 teams qualify for the Championship play-off (double round robin), bottom 4 teams play in the play-out (double round-robin).
36	2025–26 Liga I	Farul Constanța	Csíkszereda MC	Politehnica Timișoara	8	Single round-robin regular season. Top 4 teams qualify for the Championship play-off (double round robin), bottom 4 teams play in the play-out (double round-robin).
Ed.	Season	Champions	Runner-up	Third place	No. Teams	System

== Record Champions ==
Titles	Team
12	Olimpia/U Olimpia Cluj
7	Clujana Cluj
4	ICIM/Fartec Brașov
3	Interindustrial/Motorul Oradea; Farul Constanța
2	Conpet Ploiești; Regal București
1	CFR Craiova; FCM Târgu Mureș

== Top goalscorers ==
Season	Player	Team	Goals
2010–11	(Romania) Cosmina Dusa	Cluj	103
2011–12	(Romania) Cosmina Dusa	Cluj	71
2013–14	(Romania) Alexandra Lunca		31
2014–15	(Romania) Alexandra Lunca		32
2018–19	(Romania) Cristina Carp		29
2020–21	(Romania) Laura Rus		24
2021–22	(Romania) Carmen Marcu	Olimpia Cluj	??
2022–23	(Romania) Mihaela Ciolacu	Olimpia Cluj	33
2023–24	(Bulgaria) Dimitra Ivanova	Politehnica Timișoara	15
2024–25	(Romania) Adina Borodi	Olimpia Cluj	22
2025–26	(Romania) Rania Kara-Jouli	Gloria Bistrița	18

Most goals scored by a player in a single season

- (Romania) Cosmina Dusa (2010–11) – 103 goals
