= Elena Pavel =

Romanian footballer (born 1984)

Personal information
- Full name: Elena Iuliana Pavel
- Date of birth: 26 March 1984 (age 42)
- Place of birth: Constanța, Romania
- Height: 1.71 m (5 ft 7 in)
- Position: Defender

Senior career*
Years	Team	Apps	(Gls)
- Clujana
2005–2006	Smart Sport Bucharest		
2006–2007	Motorul Oradea		
2007–2020	Sporting Huelva		

International career
2000–2010	Romania	78	(7)
- * Club domestic league appearances and goals

Elena Iuliana Pavel (born 26 March 1984) is a Romanian retired footballer who played as a defender. She has been a member of the Romania women's national team. She previously played for CFF Clujana, with whom she played the UEFA Women's Cup, and Motorul Oradea.

She first played with the Romanian national team in the last match of the 2001 European Championship qualifying against Estonia. In the 2011 World Cup qualifying she scored against Bosnia and Herzegovina.

In January 2016, Pavel was asked on a date during a Primera División match versus Santa Teresa CD by the referee. Unimpressed by his advances ("Hey brown hair, let's get coffee this afternoon") Pavel answered: "Better stick to blowing your whistle". The incident left her feeling humiliated.
