= 2006–07 Cupa României (women's football) =

Tournament details
- Country: Romania

Final positions
- Champions: Pandurii

The 2006-07 Cupa României was the 4th annual Romanian women's football knockout tournaments.

== Semi-finals ==
18 April 2007

Ripensia Timișoara	v	Clujana

18 April 2007

Smart București	v	Pandurii

== Final ==
26 May 2007

Clujana	1–1	Pandurii
Penalties
	5–6
