= CS Smart Sport Bucharest =

Romanian women's football club (2003–2010)

Smart Sport Bucharest
- Full name: Club Sportiv Smart Sport Bucharest
- Founded: 2003
- Dissolved: 2010
- Ground: IMGB, Bucharest
Home colours

CS Smart Sport Bucharest was a Romanian women's football club from Bucharest that played in the First League from 2003 to 2010, when it withdrew from the championship. It reached the final of the national cup in 2005 and 2008, but lost both times to CFF Clujana.

== Competition record ==
- Liga I
  - 3rd: 2006, 2008 — 4th: 2003 — 5th: 2007, 2009, 2010
- Cupa Romaniei
  - Runner-up: 2005, 2008 — Semifinals: 2007 — Quarterfinals: 2010
