= 2007–08 Liga I (women's football) =

Liga I Feminin
- Season: 2007–08
- Champions: CFF Clujana (6th title)

The 2007–08 season of the Liga I Feminin was the 18th season of Romania's premier women's football league. CFF Clujana won the title.

== Standings ==
Pos	Team	Pld	W	D	L	GF	GA	GD	Pts	Qualification
1	CFF Clujana (C)	18	17	0	1	123	5	+118	51	2008–09 UEFA Women's Cup Qualifying round
2	CSS Târgovişte	18	15	0	3	122	11	+111	45	
3	Smart București	18	12	1	5	79	25	+54	37	
4	Ripensia Timişoara	18	12	0	6	83	35	+48	36	
5	AS CITY'US Târgu Mureş	18	11	1	6	92	36	+56	34	
6	Motorul Oradea	18	9	0	9	98	35	+63	27	
7	Şantierul Naval Constanţa	18	2	1	15	6	125	−119	7	
8	Fair Play București	18	2	1	15	12	140	−128	7	
9	CFR Constanţa	0	0	0	0	0	0	0	0	

Source: mts.ro (in Romanian)
Rules for classification: 1) points; 2) goal difference; 3) number of goals scored.
(C) Champions
