= 2008–09 Liga I (women's football) =

Liga I Feminin
- Season: 2008–09
- Champions: CFF Clujana (7th title)

The 2008–09 season of the Liga I Feminin was the 19th season of Romania's premier women's football league. CFF Clujana won the title.

== Standings ==
Pos	Team	Pld	W	D	L	GF	GA	GD	Pts	Qualification
1	CFF Clujana (C)	22	21	0	1	195	10	+185	63	2009–10 UEFA Champions League Qualifying round
2	Ripensia Timişoara	22	19	1	2	181	16	+165	58	
3	Târgovişte	22	18	1	3	108	25	+83	55	
4	AS CITY'US feminin	22	17	0	5	103	30	+73	51	
5	Sporting Craiova	22	12	1	9	67	33	+34	37	
6	Motorul Oradea	22	11	0	11	82	55	+27	33	
7	Smart București	22	9	2	11	73	53	+20	29	
8	Şantierul Naval Constanţa	22	7	0	15	44	88	−44	21	
9	Fair Play București	22	7	0	15	29	105	−76	21	
10	CS Negrea Reşiţa	22	4	1	17	22	130	−108	13	
11	Galaxy Ploieşti	22	2	0	20	13	134	−121	6	
12	Finnforest Comăneşti	22	0	0	22	2	267	−265	0	

Rules for classification: 1) points; 2) goal difference; 3) number of goals scored.
(C) Champions
