= Cupa României (women's football) =

National Women's football competition in Romania

Cupa României Fotbal Feminin
- Founded: 2004
- Region: Romania
- Teams: 36
- Current champions: U Olimpia Cluj (9th title)
- Most championships: U Olimpia Cluj (9 titles)
- Website: Official site (in Romanian)
- 2024–25

The Romanian Women's Cup (Romanian: Cupa României Fotbal Feminin) is the national women's football cup competition in Romania. The first edition of the cup was played out in the autumn of 2004, after the league season. The most titles are held by Olimpia Cluj, who won nine finals: five consecutive between 2011 and 2015, one in 2017 and three more as U Olimpia Cluj in 2021, 2022 and 2024.

== Format ==
As there are very few women's football teams listed in the country, the cup usually has a low number of entries. In the early years, along league teams, some non-league teams also participated. After the reintroduction of a second league in the Romanian women's football structure, starting with the 2013–14 season, second teams of clubs were allowed to play in the cup, up until the 2016–17 season. However, since the 2017–18 season, a club can only enter one team in the cup.

Some teams have to play preliminary matches, some start directly in the quarter-finals, depending on the league. Usually in the early rounds, the teams are paired by a geographical criterion, in order to minimize travel costs. Most games were played one-legged and are hosted by the team in the lowest league or with the weakest record in the previous season. In some years, the semifinals were played on neutral ground. The final always has been one-legged, but in 2011 the semi-finals were played with a home and away match.

== List of finals ==
The list of finals:

Ed.	Season	Winner	Result	Runner-up	Final Venue/Stadium	Losing Semifinalists	Teams
1	2004	CFF Clujana	4–0	Șantierul Naval Constanța	IMGB, București	Pandurii Târgu-Jiu and Crișul Aleșd	6?
2	2004–05	CFF Clujana	2–1	Smart Sport București	Spiru Haret University, București	Pandurii Târgu-Jiu and CSȘ Târgoviște	10
3	2005-06	CFF Clujana	3–2	Pandurii Târgu-Jiu	Municipal, Târgu Jiu	Motorul Oradea and Șantierul Naval Constanța	9?
4	2006–07	Pandurii Lignitul Târgu-Jiu	1–1 (6–5 p.)	CFF Clujana	Dan Păltinișanu, Timișoara	Smart Sport București and Ripensia 2000 Timișoara	9
5	2007–08	CFF Clujana	7–0	Smart Sport București	Ceahlăul, Piatra Neamț	CSȘ Târgoviște and Motorul Oradea	10
6	2008–09	Ripensia 2000 Timișoara	4–0	CSȘ Târgoviște	Municipal, Târgu-Jiu	CFF Clujana and Șantierul Naval Constanța	10
7	2009–10	FCM Târgu Mureş	4–0	CFF Clujana	Emil Alexandrescu, Iași	Sporting Craiova and CSȘ Târgoviște	12
8	2010–11	Olimpia Cluj	2–0	FCM Târgu Mureş	Forex, Brașov	Real Craiova and Metalul Vlăhița	13
9	2011–12	Olimpia Cluj	1–0	FCM Târgu Mureş	CNAF, Buftea	CS Brazi and FC Alice&Tunes Pitești	20
10	2012–13	Olimpia Cluj	6–0	FCM Târgu Mureş	Cetate, Alba-Iulia	CSȘ Târgoviște and CFR Timișoara	20
11	2013–14	Olimpia Cluj	3–0	ASA Târgu Mureş	Areni, Suceava	CFR Timișoara and Olimpia 2 Cluj	21
12	2014–15	Olimpia Cluj	4–0	ASA Târgu Mureş	Jean Pădureanu, Bistrița	Olimpia 2 Cluj and Fair Play București	24
13	2015–16	ASA Târgu Mureş	2–1	Olimpia Cluj	Michael Klein, Hunedoara	Fair Play București and Real Craiova	29
14	2016–17	Olimpia Cluj	5–0	Navobi Iaşi	Emil Alexandrescu, Iași	Heniu Prundu Bârgăului and CSȘ Târgoviște	34
15	2017–18	CSȘ Târgoviște	3–0	Heniu Prundu Bârgăului	Municipal, Sfântu Gheorghe	Piroş Security Arad and Vasas Femina Odorheiu Secuiesc	33
16	2018–19	Vasas Femina Odorheiu Secuiesc	5–0	Fortuna Becicherecu Mic	Trans-Sil, Târgu-Mureș	Universitatea Galați and U Olimpia Cluj	37
17	2019–20	Cancelled due to COVID-19 pandemic during the Third Round/Round of 16					40
18	2020–21	U Olimpia Cluj	1–0 (a.e.t.)	Heniu Prundu Bârgăului	Francisc von Neuman, Arad	Piroş Security Arad and Vulpițele Galbene Roman	38
19	2021–22	U Olimpia Cluj	6–2	Heniu Prundu Bârgăului	Arcul de Triumf, București	Vasas Femina Odorheiu Secuiesc and Piroş Security Arad	36
20	2022–23	Carmen București	2–1 (a.e.t.)	U Olimpia Cluj	Arcul de Triumf, București	Csíkszereda MC and CS Gloria Bistrița-Năsăud	44
21	2023–24	U Olimpia Cluj	3–1 (a.e.t.)	Csíkszereda MC	Arcul de Triumf, București	Vasas Femina FC and CS Gloria Bistrița-Năsăud	46

== Performances ==
=== Performance by club ===
No.	Team	Winners	Runners-up	Losing Semifinalists	Total apps. in Last 4
1	Olimpia/U Olimpia Cluj	9	2	1	12
2	CFF Clujana	4	2	1	7
3	ASA/FCM Târgu Mureş	2	5	–	7
4	CSȘ Târgoviște	1	1	5	7
5	Pandurii Târgu-Jiu	1	1	2	4
6	Vasas Femina Odorheiu Secuiesc/Metalul Vlăhița	1	–	4	5
7	Ripensia 2000 Timișoara	1	–	1	2
8	Carmen București	1	–	–	1
9	Heniu Prundu Bârgăului	–	3	1	4
10	Smart Sport București	–	2	1	3
11	Șantierul Naval Constanța	–	1	2	3
12	Csíkszereda MC	–	1	1	2
13–14	Navobi Iaşi	–	1	–	1
13–14	Fortuna Becicherecu Mic	–	1	–	1
15	Piroş Security Arad	–	–	3	3
16–21	Motorul Oradea	–	–	2	2
16–21	Real Craiova	–	–	2	2
16–21	CFR Timișoara	–	–	2	2
16–21	Olimpia 2 Cluj	–	–	2	2
16–21	Fair Play București	–	–	2	2
16–21	CS Gloria Bistrița-Năsăud	–	–	2	2
22–27	Crișul Aleșd	–	–	1	1
22–27	Sporting Craiova	–	–	1	1
22–27	CS Brazi	–	–	1	1
22–27	FC Alice&Tunes Pitești	–	–	1	1
22–27	Universitatea Galați	–	–	1	1
22–27	Vulpițele Galbene Roman	–	–	1	1

=== Performance by city ===
No.	City	Cups	Winning clubs
1	Cluj-Napoca	12	Olimpia/U Olimpia Cluj (8), CFF Clujana (4)
2	Târgu-Mureș	2	FCM/ASA Târgu Mureş (2)
3–6	Târgu-Jiu	1	Pandurii Târgu-Jiu (1)
3–6	Timișoara	1	Ripensia 2000 Timișoara (1)
3–6	Târgoviște	1	CSȘ Târgoviște (1)
3–6	Odorheiu Secuiesc	1	Vasas Femina Odorheiu Secuiesc (1)

== See also ==
- Romanian Cup, men's edition
