= CS Motorul Oradea =

Romanian women's football club

Motorul Oradea
- Full name: Club Sportiv Motorul Oradea
- Founded: 1990
- Dissolved: 2012
- Ground: Motorul / Comunal
- Capacity: 1,000 / 1,000
Home colours

Club Sportiv Motorul Oradea was a Romanian women's football club from Oradea that played in the Liga I. They won three national championships in a row from 1996 to 1998. In October 2012 the club withdrew from the championship due to financial turmoil.

== Honours ==
=== Titles ===
- Liga I (3)
  - 1996, 1997, 1998

=== Competition record ===
- Liga I
  - 1st: 1996, 1997, 1998 — 3rd: 2002, 2005 — 4th: 2003, 2006, 2007, 2010 — 6th: 2008, 2011 — 7th: 2012 — 9th: 2009
- Cupa Rumaniei
  - Semifinals: 2008 — Quarterfinals: 2005, 2010 — First Round: 2004

== Former internationals ==
- (Romania) Elena Pavel
