= Brazil women's national football team results (2010–2019) =

- Win Draw Loss

This is a list of the Brazil women's national football team results from 2010 to 2019.

== Results ==
=== 2010 ===
24 October 2010 Friendly	Brazil	7–0	Haiti	Teresópolis, Brazil
	Renata Costa; Grazielle; Marta; Cristiane (3 goals); Rosana	Report		Stadium: Granja Comary; Referee: Marcelo de Lima Henrique (Brazil)

5 November 2010 2010 South American Women's Football Championship	Brazil	4–0	Venezuela	Loja, Ecuador
19:00 UTC-5	Aline 26', 30'; Cristiane 42'; Renata Costa 60'			Stadium: Estadio Federativo Reina del Cisne; Referee: Sirley Cornejo (Bolivia)

7 November 2010 2010 South American Women's Football Championship	Uruguay	0–4	Brazil	Loja, Ecuador
19:00 UTC-5		Report	Cristiane 15' (pen.), 40'; Marta 36', 57'	Stadium: Estadio Federativo Reina del Cisne; Referee: Juana Delgado Torres (Ecuador)

11 November 2010 2010 South American Women's Football Championship	Colombia	1–2	Brazil	Cuenca, Ecuador
19:00 UTC-5	Muñoz 57'	Report	Cristiane 13'; Marta 28'	Stadium: Estadio Alejandro Serrano Aguilar; Referee: Estela Álvarez (Argentina)

13 November 2010 2010 South American Women's Football Championship	Brazil	3–0	Paraguay	Cuenca, Ecuador
19:00 UTC-5	Cristiane 18', 36'; Marta 57'	Report		Stadium: Estadio Alejandro Serrano Aguilar; Referee: Silvia Reyes (Peru)

17 November 2010 2010 South American Women's Football Championship	Brazil	4–0	Argentina	Latacunga, Ecuador
17:00 UTC-5	Grazielle 25'; Rosana 37'; Marta 63'; Cristiane 77'	Report		Stadium: Estadio La Cocha; Referee: Norma González (Paraguay)

19 November 2010 2010 South American Women's Football Championship	Brazil	5–0	Colombia	Latacunga, Ecuador
19:00 UTC-5	Érika 23'; Grazielle 48'; Marta 69', 87'; Cristiane 82'	Report		Stadium: Estadio La Cocha; Referee: Gabriela Bandeira (Uruguay)

21 November 2010 2010 South American Women's Football Championship	Chile	1–3	Brazil	Quito, Ecuador
12:00 UTC-5	Salgado 45'	Report	Daniele 2'; Marta 36', 83'	Stadium: Estadio Olímpico Atahualpa; Referee: Juana Delgado Torres (Ecuador)

9 December 2010 2010 Torneio Internacional de Futebol Feminino	Brazil	3–0	Mexico	São Paulo, Brazil
22:00	Cristiane 21'; Marta 57', 61'	Report		Stadium: Estádio do Pacaembu; Attendance: 3,397; Referee: Regildenia de Holanda Moura (Brazil)

12 December 2010 2010 Torneio Internacional de Futebol Feminino	Brazil	3–2	Netherlands	São Paulo, Brazil
16:00	Marta 9', 66'; Gabi Zanotti 90+3'	Report	van de Ven 30'; de Ridder 59'	Stadium: Estádio do Pacaembu; Referee: Flamarion David Volpe (Brazil)

15 December 2010 2010 Torneio Internacional de Futebol Feminino	Brazil	0–0	Canada	São Paulo, Brazil
22:00		Report		Stadium: Estádio do Pacaembu; Attendance: 3,896; Referee: Wander Escardine (Brazil)

19 December 2010 2010 Torneio Internacional de Futebol Feminino	Brazil	2–2	Canada	São Paulo, Brazil
17:00	Marta 54', 72' (pen.)	Report	Bélanger 42'; Sinclair 82'	Stadium: Estádio do Pacaembu; Attendance: 17,264; Referee: Katiucia da Mota Lima (Brazil)

=== 2011 ===
14 May 2011 Friendly	Brazil	3–0	Chile	Maceió, Brazil
16:00	Aline 19'; Marta 39'; Rosana 88'	Report		Stadium: Estádio Rei Pelé; Referee: Ana Karina Marques (Brazil)

29 June 2011 2011 FIFA Women's World Cup Group D	Brazil	1–0	Australia	Mönchengladbach, Germany
18:15	Rosana 54'	Report		Stadium: Borussia-Park; Attendance: 27,258; Referee: Jenny Palmqvist (Sweden)

3 July 2011 2011 FIFA Women's World Cup Group D	Brazil	3–0	Norway	Wolfsburg, Germany
18:15	Marta 22', 48'; Rosana 46'	Report		Stadium: Volkswagen Arena; Attendance: 26,067; Referee: Kari Seitz (United States)

6 July 2011 2011 FIFA Women's World Cup Group D	Equatorial Guinea	0–3	Brazil	Frankfurt, Germany
18:00		Report	Érika 49'; Cristiane 54', 90+3' (pen.)	Stadium: Waldstadion; Attendance: 35,859; Referee: Bibiana Steinhaus (Germany)

10 July 2011 2011 FIFA Women's World Cup Quarterfinals	Brazil	2–2 (a.e.t.) (3–5 p)	United States	Dresden, Germany
17:30	Marta 68' (pen.), 92'	Report	Daiane 2' (o.g.); Wambach 120+2'	Stadium: Rudolf-Harbig-Stadion; Attendance: 25,598
	Penalties
	Cristiane (penalty scored); Marta (penalty scored); Daiane (penalty missed); Francielle (penalty scored)		(penalty scored) Boxx; (penalty scored) Lloyd; (penalty scored) Wambach; (penalty scored) Rapinoe; (penalty scored) Krieger

18 October 2011 2011 Pan American Games Group B	Argentina	0–2	Brazil	Zapopan, Mexico
17:00		Report	Thaisinha 27'; Daniele 37'	Stadium: Estadio Omnilife; Attendance: 5,967; Referee: Lucila Venegas (Mexico)

20 October 2011 2011 Pan American Games Group B	Costa Rica	1–2	Brazil	Zapopan, Mexico
17:00	Cruz 90+5'	Report	Debinha 59'; Thaisinha 62'	Stadium: Estadio Omnilife; Attendance: 6,837; Referee: Dianne James (Guyana)

22 October 2011 2011 Pan American Games Group B	Brazil	0–0	Canada	Zapopan, Mexico
20:00		Report		Stadium: Estadio Omnilife; Attendance: 16,316; Referee: Irasema Aguilera (Cuba)

25 October 2011 2011 Pan American Games Semifinals	Mexico	0–1	Brazil	Zapopan, Mexico
17:00		Report	Maurine 79'	Stadium: Estadio Omnilife; Attendance: 19,770; Referee: Irasema Aguilera (Cuba)

27 October 2011 2011 Pan American Games Gold medal match	Brazil	1–1 (a.e.t.) (3–4 p)	Canada	Zapopan, Mexico
17:45	Debinha 4'	Report	Sinclair 87'	Stadium: Estadio Omnilife; Attendance: 36,614; Referee: Dianne James (Guyana)
	Penalties
	Francielle (penalty scored); Maurine (penalty scored); Grazielle (penalty missed); Ketlen (penalty scored); Debinha (penalty missed)		(penalty scored) Matheson; (penalty scored) Sinclair; (penalty scored) Booth; (penalty scored) Schmidt; (penalty missed) Chapman

8 December 2011 2011 Torneio Internacional de Futebol Feminino	Brazil	5–1	Italy	São Paulo, Brazil
21:15	Érika 19'; Ester 61'; Cristiane 68'; Marta 89'; Aline 90'	Report	Tona 18'	Stadium: Estádio do Pacaembu; Referee: Regildenia de Holanda Moura (Brazil)

11 December 2011 2011 Torneio Internacional de Futebol Feminino	Brazil	4–0	Chile	São Paulo, Brazil
17:15	Érika 13'; Rosana 21'; Thaisinha 26'; Fabiana 55'	Report		Stadium: Estádio do Pacaembu; Referee: Katiucia da Mota Lima (Brazil)

15 December 2011 2011 Torneio Internacional de Futebol Feminino	Brazil	0–1	Denmark	São Paulo, Brazil
21:00		Report	Troelsgaard 32'	Stadium: Estádio do Pacaembu; Referee: Edilar Maria Ferreira (Brazil)

18 December 2011 2011 Torneio Internacional de Futebol Feminino	Brazil	2–1	Denmark	São Paulo, Brazil
21:00	Érika 64', 74'	Report	Harder 53'	Stadium: Estádio do Pacaembu; Referee: Katiucia da Mota Lima (Brazil)

=== 2012 ===
24 March 2012 Friendly	Canada	2–1	Brazil	Foxborough, United States
13:00	Sinclair 11', 76'	Report	Gabi Zanotti 41' (pen.)	Stadium: Gillette Stadium; Attendance: 3,000; Referee: Kari Seitz (United States)

3 April 2012 Kirin Challenge Cup	United States	3–0	Brazil	Chiba, Japan
	Lloyd 18'; Boxx 23'; Rodriguez 83'	Report		Stadium: Fukuda Denshi Arena; Attendance: 300; Referee: Sachiko Yamagishi (Japan)

5 April 2012 Kirin Challenge Cup	Japan	4–1	Brazil	Kobe, Japan
	Daiane 15' (o.g.); Nagasato 57'; Miyama 61'; Sugasawa 88'	Report	Francielle 44'	Stadium: Noevir Stadium Kobe; Attendance: 12,862; Referee: Ji Young Park (South Korea)

14 July 2012 2012 Matchworld Women's Cup	Brazil	2–1	Colombia	Châtel-Saint-Denis, Switzerland
	Rosana 10'; Formiga 74'	Report	Velásquez 51'	Stadium: Stade du Lussy; Referee: Jorge Mendez (Switzerland)

17 July 2012 2012 Matchworld Women's Cup	Brazil	2–1	Canada	Savièse, Switzerland
	Formiga 42'; Grazielle 90+2'	Report	Sinclair 90+1'	Stadium: Stade Saint-Germain; Referee: Simona Ghisletta (Switzerland)

25 July 2012 2012 Olympics Group E	Cameroon	0–5	Brazil	Cardiff, United Kingdom
18:45		Report	Francielle 7'; Renata Costa 10'; Marta 73' (pen.), 88'; Cristiane 78'	Stadium: Millennium Stadium; Attendance: 30,847; Referee: Jenny Palmqvist (Sweden)

28 July 2012 2012 Olympics Group E	New Zealand	0–1	Brazil	Cardiff, United Kingdom
14:30		Report	Cristiane 86'	Stadium: Millennium Stadium; Attendance: 30,103; Referee: Bibiana Steinhaus (Germany)

31 July 2012 2012 Olympics Group E	Great Britain	1–0	Brazil	London, United Kingdom
19:45	Houghton 2'	Report		Stadium: Wembley Stadium; Attendance: 70,584; Referee: Carol Anne Chenard (Canada)

3 August 2012 2012 Olympics Quarterfinals	Brazil	0–2	Japan	Cardiff, United Kingdom
17:00		Report	Ōgimi 27'; Ohno 73'	Stadium: Millennium Stadium; Attendance: 28,528; Referee: Kirsi Heikkinen (Finland)

9 December 2012 2012 Torneio Internacional de Futebol Feminino	Brazil	4–0	Portugal	São Paulo, Brazil
16:00	Cristiane 7'; Fabiana 34'; Marta 46'; Giovânia 84'	Report		Stadium: Estádio do Pacaembu; Referee: Katiucia da Mota Lima (Brazil)

13 December 2012 2012 Torneio Internacional de Futebol Feminino	Brazil	1–2	Mexico	São Paulo, Brazil
21:50	Rosana 13'	Report	Guajardo 60'; Domínguez 88'	Stadium: Estádio do Pacaembu; Referee: Fernanda Ignácio de Souza (Brazil)

16 December 2012 2012 Torneio Internacional de Futebol Feminino	Brazil	2–1	Denmark	São Paulo, Brazil
16:00	Érika 6'; Debinha 90'	Report	Hansen 90+3' (pen.)	Stadium: Estádio do Pacaembu; Referee: Regildenia de Holanda Moura (Brazil)

19 December 2012 2012 Torneio Internacional de Futebol Feminino	Brazil	2–2	Denmark	São Paulo, Brazil
20:50	Andressa Alves 28' (pen.); Fabiana 47'	Report	Rasmussen 82' (pen.); Junge 86'	Stadium: Estádio do Pacaembu; Attendance: 2,871; Referee: Regildenia de Holanda Moura (Brazil)

=== 2013 ===
6 March 2013 Friendly	France	2–2	Brazil	Tomblaine, France
	Le Sommer 56'; Thiney 76' (pen.)	Report	Giovânia 31', 78'	Stadium: Stade Marcel Picot; Attendance: 16,572; Referee: Alexandra Ihringova (England)

9 March 2013 Friendly	France	1–1	Brazil	Le Petit-Quevilly, France
	Necib 90+6' (pen.)	Report	Georges 49' (o.g.)	Stadium: Stade Robert Diochon; Attendance: 6,884; Referee: Simona Ghisletta (Switzerland)

18 June 2013 Friendly	Sweden	1–1	Brazil	Stockholm, Sweden
	Fischer 5'	Report	Andressa Alves 65' (pen.)	Stadium: Söderstadion; Referee: Christina Pedersen (Norway)

22 September 2013 2013 Valais Women's Cup	Brazil	0–1	New Zealand	Châtel-Saint-Denis, Switzerland
16:30		Report	Hearn 66'	Stadium: Stade du Lussy; Referee: Stéphanie Frappart (France)

25 September 2013 2013 Valais Women's Cup	Brazil	4–0	Mexico	Savièse, Switzerland
14:30	Fabiana 19'; Debinha 24', 51'; Tamires 90+1'	Report		Stadium: Stade Saint-Germain; Referee: Esther Staubli (Switzerland)

10 November 2013 Friendly	United States	4–1	Brazil	Orlando, United States
	Leroux 15', 36'; Wambach 17' (pen.); Tymrak 75'	Report	Rosana 25'	Stadium: Camping World Stadium; Attendance: 20,274; Referee: Margaret Domka (United States)

12 December 2013 2013 Torneio Internacional de Futebol Feminino	Brazil	2–0	Chile	Brasília, Brazil
21:50	Marta 10'; Thaisa 32'	Report		Stadium: Estádio Mané Garrincha; Attendance: 2,871; Referee: Rodrigo Raposo (Brazil)

15 December 2013 2013 Torneio Internacional de Futebol Feminino	Brazil	3–1	Scotland	Brasília, Brazil
16:00	Marta 26'; Debinha 34', 48'	Report	Lauder 74'	Stadium: Estádio Mané Garrincha; Referee: Ademário Neves (Brazil)

18 December 2013 2013 Torneio Internacional de Futebol Feminino	Brazil	0–0	Canada	Brasília, Brazil
22:00		Report		Stadium: Estádio Mané Garrincha; Referee: Vanderlei Soares Macedo (Brazil)

22 December 2013 2013 Torneio Internacional de Futebol Feminino	Brazil	5–0	Chile	Brasília, Brazil
16:00	Formiga 8'; Marta 41'; Darlene 56'; Cristiane 76'; Debinha 85'	Report		Stadium: Estádio Mané Garrincha; Referee: Rodrigo Raposo (Brazil)

=== 2014 ===
8 March 2014 2014 South American Games Group B	Uruguay	0–0	Brazil	Santiago, Chile
18:00		Report		Stadium: Estadio Bicentenario de La Florida; Referee: Laura Fortunato (Argentina)

10 March 2014 2014 South American Games Group B	Venezuela	0–5	Brazil	Santiago, Chile
20:00		Report	Cristiane 15', 62'; Darlene 26'; Bruna Benites 30'; Poliana 40'	Stadium: Estadio Bicentenario de La Florida

12 March 2014 2014 South American Games Group B	Brazil	2–1	Colombia	Santiago, Chile
18:00	Rafa Travalão 29'; Bruna Benites 47'	Report	Pineda 66'	Stadium: Estadio Bicentenario de La Florida; Referee: Paola Barria (Chile)

14 March 2014 2014 South American Games Semifinals	Brazil	0–0 (3–5 p)	Argentina	Santiago, Chile
18:00		Report		Stadium: Estadio Bicentenario de La Florida; Referee: Viviana Muñoz (Colombia)
	Penalties
	Cristiane (penalty missed); Bia Vaz (penalty scored); Tamires (penalty scored); Poliana (penalty scored)		(penalty scored) Vallejos; (penalty scored) Larroquette; (penalty scored) Banini; (penalty scored) Espíndola; (penalty scored) Pereyra

16 March 2014 2014 South American Games Bronze medal match	Brazil	2–0	Venezuela	Santiago, Chile
18:00	Bruna Benites 14'; Poliana 83'	Report		Stadium: Estadio Bicentenario de La Florida; Referee: Débora Bastias (Chile)

6 April 2014 Friendly	Australia	0–1	Brazil	Brisbane, Australia
15:00		Report	Debinha 67'	Stadium: Queensland Sport and Athletics Centre; Attendance: 2,583; Referee: Nami Inazumi (Japan)

9 April 2014 Friendly	Australia	2–1	Brazil	Brisbane, Australia
16:30	Gill 37'; Heyman 81'	Report	Tamires 52'	Stadium: Queensland Sport and Athletics Centre; Referee: Rikako Kuwahara (Japan)

11 June 2014 Friendly	France	0–0	Brazil	Cayenne, French Guyana
20:45		Report		Stadium: Stade Municipal Dr. Edmard Lama; Referee: Stéphanie Frappart (France)

16 June 2014 Friendly	New Zealand	1–1	Brazil	Auckland, New Zealand
19:00	White 75'	Report	Cristiane 43'	Stadium: Mount Smart Stadium; Referee: Anna-Marie Keighley (New Zealand)

19 June 2014 Friendly	New Zealand	0–0	Brazil	Taupō, New Zealand
18:30		Report		Stadium: Owen Delany Park; Referee: Nick Waldron (New Zealand)

20 August 2014 Friendly	Netherlands	0–0	Brazil	Nijmegen, Netherlands
		Report		Stadium: Goffertstadion; Referee: Amy Fearn (England)

12 September 2014 2014 Copa América Femenina	Brazil	6–0	Bolivia	Loja, Ecuador
19:10	Formiga 19', 73'; Andressa Alves 30'; Darlene 51'; Thaisa 84'; Fabiana 90+2'	Report		Stadium: Estadio Federativo Reina del Cisne; Referee: Juana Delgado (Ecuador)

14 September 2014 2014 Copa América Femenina	Paraguay	1–4	Brazil	Ambato, Ecuador
15:10	Fleitas 9'	Report	Andressa Alves 35'; Cristiane 45+5', 56'; Fabiana 57'	Stadium: Estadio Bellavista; Referee: Silvia Reyes (Peru)

18 September 2014 2014 Copa América Femenina	Chile	0–2	Brazil	Cuenca, Ecuador
19:10		Report	Maurine 22'; Cristiane 49'	Stadium: Estadio Alejandro Serrano Aguilar; Referee: Viviana Muñoz (Colombia)

20 September 2014 2014 Copa América Femenina	Brazil	0–2	Argentina	Azogues, Ecuador
16:10		Report	Cometti 23'; Banini 73' (pen.)	Stadium: Estadio Jorge Andrade; Referee: Gabriela Bandeira (Uruguay)

24 September 2014 2014 Copa América Femenina	Brazil	4–0	Ecuador	Quito, Ecuador
15:10	Cristiane 14', 17'; Maurine 37'; Raquel Fernandes 87'	Report		Stadium: Estadio Chillogallo; Referee: Yercinia Correa (Venezuela)

26 September 2014 2014 Copa América Femenina	Brazil	6–0	Argentina	Sangolquí, Ecuador
18:10	Cristiane 32'; Andressa Alves 36'; Maurine 58'; Tayla 66'; Tamires 71'; Raquel Fernandes 84'	Report		Stadium: Estadio Rumiñahui; Referee: María Carvajal (Chile)

28 September 2014 2014 Copa América Femenina	Colombia	0–0	Brazil	Quito, Ecuador
12:10		Report		Stadium: Estadio Olímpico Atahualpa; Referee: Gabriela Bandeira (Uruguay)

26 November 2014 Friendly	France	2–0	Brazil	Lyon, France
	Le Sommer 31'; Dalí 61'	Report		Stadium: Stade de Gerland; Referee: Maria Kurtes (Germany)

10 December 2014 2014 Torneio Internacional de Futebol Feminino	Brazil	4–0	Argentina	Brasília, Brazil
21:50	Debinha 14'; Formiga 41', 82'; Raquel Fernandes 78'	Report		Stadium: Estádio Mané Garrincha; Attendance: 1,603; Referee: Simone Xavier (Brazil)

14 December 2014 2014 Torneio Internacional de Futebol Feminino	Brazil	3–2	United States	Brasília, Brazil
18:45	Marta 19', 55', 64'	Report	Lloyd 6'; Rapinoe 9'	Stadium: Estádio Mané Garrincha; Attendance: 2,711; Referee: Wilton Pereira Sampaio (Brazil)

18 December 2014 2014 Torneio Internacional de Futebol Feminino	Brazil	4–1	China	Brasília, Brazil
21:50	Darlene 13'; Andressinha 25'; Debinha 60'; Andressa Alves 64' (pen.)	Report	Ren Guixin 90+3'	Stadium: Estádio Mané Garrincha; Attendance: 1,718; Referee: Ana Karina Marques (Brazil)

21 December 2014 2014 Torneio Internacional de Futebol Feminino	Brazil	0–0	United States	Brasília, Brazil
19:00		Report		Stadium: Estádio Mané Garrincha; Attendance: 11,287; Referee: Regildenia de Holanda Moura (Brazil)

=== 2015 ===
4 March 2015 2015 Algarve Cup	Brazil	0–0	China	Albufeira, Portugal
15:00		Report		Stadium: Estádio Municipal; Referee: Stéphanie Frappart (France)

6 March 2015 2015 Algarve Cup	Sweden	0–2	Brazil	Lagos, Portugal
13:30		Report	Marta 20'; Andressa Alves 68' (pen.)	Stadium: Estádio Municipal; Referee: Qin Liang (China)

9 March 2015 2015 Algarve Cup	Brazil	1–3	Germany	Parchal, Portugal
17:30	Bruna Benites 47'	Report	Popp 39'; Šašić 49'; Marozsán 56'	Stadium: Estádio Bela Vista; Referee: Melissa Borjas (Honduras)

11 March 2015 2015 Algarve Cup	Brazil	4–1	Switzerland	Albufeira, Portugal
15:30	Marta 30', 77'; Bia Zaneratto 37'; Andressa Alves 82'	Report	Wälti 45'	Stadium: Estádio Municipal; Referee: Jana Adámková (Czech Republic)

8 April 2015 Friendly	Germany	4–0	Brazil	Fürth, Germany
18:00	Šašić 26' (pen.); Laudehr 35'; Leupolz 60'; Marozsán 86'	Report		Stadium: Stadion am Laubenweg; Attendance: 15,043; Referee: Riem Hussein (Germany)

9 June 2015 2015 FIFA Women's World Cup Group E	Brazil	2–0	South Korea	Montreal, Canada
19:00 EDT (UTC−4)	Formiga 33'; Marta 53' (pen.)	Report		Stadium: Olympic Stadium; Attendance: 10,175; Referee: Esther Staubli (Switzerland)

13 June 2015 2015 FIFA Women's World Cup Group E	Brazil	1–0	Spain	Montreal, Canada
16:00 EDT (UTC−4)	Andressa Alves 44'	Report		Stadium: Olympic Stadium; Attendance: 28,623; Referee: Carol Anne Chenard (Canada)

17 June 2015 2015 FIFA Women's World Cup Group E	Costa Rica	0–1	Brazil	Moncton, Canada
20:00 ADT (UTC−3)		Report	Raquel Fernandes 83'	Stadium: Moncton Stadium; Attendance: 9,543; Referee: Efthalia Mitsi (Greece)

21 June 2015 2015 FIFA Women's World Cup Round of 16	Brazil	0–1	Australia	Moncton, Canada
14:00 ADT (UTC−3)		Report	Simon 80'	Stadium: Moncton Stadium; Attendance: 12,054; Referee: Teodora Albon (Romania)

11 July 2015 2015 Pan American Games Group B	Costa Rica	0–3	Brazil	Hamilton, Canada
18:05		Report	Raquel Fernandes 14'; Thaisa 34'; Formiga 90'	Stadium: Hamilton Pan Am Soccer Stadium; Referee: Ekaterina Koroleva (United States)

15 July 2015 2015 Pan American Games Group B	Brazil	7–1	Ecuador	Hamilton, Canada
17:35	Monica 17'; Cristiane 44', 55', 67', 70', 78'; Maurine 84'	Report	Pesántes 5'	Stadium: Hamilton Pan Am Soccer Stadium; Referee: Gillian Martindale (Barbados)

19 July 2015 2015 Pan American Games Group B	Canada	0–2	Brazil	Hamilton, Canada
20:35		Report	Andressa Alves 55'; Cristiane 87'	Stadium: Hamilton Pan Am Soccer Stadium; Referee: Ekaterina Koroleva (United States)

22 July 2015 2015 Pan American Games Semifinals	Brazil	4–2	Mexico	Hamilton, Canada
17:35	Cristiane 4'; Rafaelle 45+1', 73'; Romero 46' (o.g.)	Report	Fabiana 25' (o.g.); Rangel 70'	Stadium: Hamilton Pan Am Soccer Stadium; Referee: Marie-Soleil Beaudoin (Canada)

25 July 2015 2015 Pan American Games Gold medal match	Brazil	4–0	Colombia	Hamilton, Canada
18:35	Formiga 7'; Maurine 75'; Andressa Alves 86'; Fabiana 90+3'	Report		Stadium: Hamilton Pan Am Soccer Stadium; Referee: Mirian León (El Salvador)

19 September 2015 Friendly	France	2–1	Brazil	Le Havre, France
19:00	Renard 37'; Henry 55'	Report	Poliana 80'	Stadium: Stade Océane; Attendance: 22,053; Referee: Kateryna Monzul (Ukraine)

21 October 2015 Friendly	United States	1–1	Brazil	Seattle, United States
19:00	Lloyd 75'	Report	Monica 3'	Stadium: CenturyLink Field; Attendance: 23,603; Referee: Ekaterina Koroleva (United States)

25 October 2015 Friendly	United States	3–1	Brazil	Orlando, United States
15:00	Morgan 8'; Dunn 45+2'; McCaffrey 90+3'	Report	Cristiane 44'	Stadium: Camping World Stadium; Attendance: 32,859; Referee: Margaret Domka (United States)

28 November 2015 Friendly	Brazil	0–1	New Zealand	São Paulo, Brazil
15:30		Report	Hearn 36'	Stadium: Estádio do Pacaembu; Attendance: 3,000; Referee: Claudia Umpiérrez (Uruguay)

1 December 2015 Friendly	Brazil	5–1	New Zealand	Cuiabá, Brazil
	Poliana 56'; Érika 57'; Formiga 59'; Marta 87'; Debinha 90+3'	Report	Gregorius 29'	Stadium: Arena Pantanal; Attendance: 7,758; Referee: Zulma Quiñonez (Paraguay)

9 December 2015 2015 Torneio Internacional de Futebol Feminino	Brazil	11–0	Trinidad and Tobago	Natal, Brazil
20:45	Marta 10', 28', 30', 52', 58'; Bia Zaneratto 33', 55', 64'; Debinha 48'; Raquel Fernandes 70'; Rilany 79'	Report		Stadium: Arena das Dunas; Attendance: 4,128; Referee: Ana Karina Marques (Brazil)

13 December 2015 2015 Torneio Internacional de Futebol Feminino	Brazil	6–0	Mexico	Natal, Brazil
17:00	Marta 2' (pen.), 11' (pen.); Debinha 18'; Andressa Alves 32'; Formiga 53'; Poliana 68'	Report		Stadium: Arena das Dunas; Referee: Dewson Freitas da Silva (Brazil)

16 December 2015 2015 Torneio Internacional de Futebol Feminino	Brazil	2–1	Canada	Natal, Brazil
20:45	Andressa Alves 12'; Debinha 40'	Report	Bélanger 43'	Stadium: Arena das Dunas; Attendance: 6,632; Referee: Simone Xavier (Brazil)

20 December 2015 2015 Torneio Internacional de Futebol Feminino	Brazil	3–1	Canada	Natal, Brazil
18:30	Andressa Alves 47'; Mônica 63', 81'	Report	Beckie 46'	Stadium: Arena das Dunas; Attendance: 10,643; Referee: Ana Karina Marques (Brazil)

=== 2016 ===
2 March 2016 2016 Algarve Cup	Brazil	1–0	New Zealand	Lagos, Portugal
18:30	Debinha 20'	Report		Stadium: Estádio Municipal; Referee: Marianela Araya (Costa Rica)

4 March 2016 2016 Algarve Cup	Portugal	1–3	Brazil	Vila Real de Santo António, Portugal
20:00	T. Pinto 30'	Report	Cristiane 17'; Marta 22'; Raquel Fernandes 74'	Stadium: VRS António Sports Complex; Referee: Monika Mularczyk (Poland)

7 March 2016 2016 Algarve Cup	Russia	0–3	Brazil	Lagos, Portugal
15:30		Report	Formiga 51'; Bia Zaneratto 66'; Thaís Guedes 89'	Stadium: Estádio Municipal; Referee: Sandra Braz (Portugal)

9 March 2016 2016 Algarve Cup	Canada	2–1	Brazil	Parchal, Portugal
18:30	Zadorsky 60'; Beckie 67'	Report	Andressa Alves 90'	Stadium: Estádio Bela Vista; Referee: Sara Persson (Sweden)

4 June 2016 Friendly	Canada	0–2	Brazil	Toronto, Canada
16:00		Report	Marta 11', 41'	Stadium: BMO Field; Attendance: 28,608; Referee: Ekaterina Koroleva (United States)

7 June 2016 Friendly	Canada	1–0	Brazil	Ottawa, Canada
19:00	Beckie 88'	Report		Stadium: TD Place Stadium; Attendance: 23,588; Referee: Francia González (Mexico)

23 July 2016 Friendly	Brazil	3–1	Australia	Fortaleza, Brazil
16:00	Debinha 59'; Raquel Fernandes 71'; Darlene 90+2'	Report	Crummer 31'	Stadium: Estádio Presidente Vargas; Attendance: 8,197; Referee: Ana Karina Marques (Brazil)

3 August 2016 2016 Olympics Group E	Brazil	3–0	China	Rio de Janeiro, Brazil
16:00	Monica 36'; Andressa 59'; Cristiane 90'	Report (Rio2016); Report (FIFA)		Stadium: Estádio Engenhão; Attendance: 27,618; Referee: Carol Chenard (Canada)

6 August 2016 2016 Olympics Group E	Brazil	5–1	Sweden	Rio de Janeiro, Brazil
22:00	Bia Zaneratto 21', 86'; Cristiane 24'; Marta 44' (pen.), 80'	Report (Rio2016); Report (FIFA); Report	Schelin 89'	Stadium: Estádio Engenhão; Attendance: 43,384; Referee: Lucila Venegas (Mexico)

9 August 2016 2016 Olympics Group E	South Africa	0–0	Brazil	Manaus, Brazil
22:00		Report (Rio2016); Report (FIFA)		Stadium: Arena da Amazônia; Attendance: 38,415; Referee: Stéphanie Frappart (France)

12 August 2016 2016 Olympics Quarterfinals	Brazil	0–0 (a.e.t.) (7–6 p)	Australia	Belo Horizonte, Brazil
22:00		Report (Rio2016); Report (FIFA)		Stadium: Mineirão; Attendance: 52,660; Referee: Carol Chenard (Canada)
	Penalties
	Andressa Alves (penalty scored); Andressinha (penalty scored); Bia Zaneratto (penalty scored); Rafaelle (penalty scored); Marta (penalty missed); Debinha (penalty scored); Monica (penalty scored); Tamires (penalty scored)		(penalty scored) Kellond-Knight; (penalty scored) Alleway; (penalty scored) van Egmond; (penalty scored) Polkinghorne; (penalty missed) Gorry; (penalty scored) Heyman; (penalty scored) Logarzo; (penalty missed) Kennedy

16 August 2016 2016 Olympics Semifinals	Brazil	0–0 (a.e.t.) (3–4 p)	Sweden	Rio de Janeiro, Brazil
13:00		Report (Rio2016); Report (FIFA); Report		Stadium: Estádio do Maracanã; Attendance: 70,454; Referee: Lucila Venegas (Mexico)
	Penalties
	Marta (penalty scored); Cristiane (penalty missed); Andressa Alves (penalty scored); Rafaelle (penalty scored); Andressinha (penalty missed)		(penalty scored) Schelin; (penalty missed) Asllani; (penalty scored) Seger; (penalty scored) Fischer; (penalty scored) Dahlkvist

19 August 2016 2016 Olympics Bronze medal match	Brazil	1–2	Canada	São Paulo, Brazil
13:00	Bia Zaneratto 79'	Report (Rio2016); Report (FIFA)	Rose 25'; Sinclair 52'	Stadium: Arena de Itaquera; Attendance: 39,718; Referee: Teodora Albon (Romania)

16 September 2016 Friendly	France	1–1	Brazil	Grenoble, France
21:00	Lavogez 2'	Report	Marta 8'	Stadium: Stade des Alpes; Attendance: 18,020; Referee: Carina Susana Vitulano (Italy)

7 December 2016 2016 Torneio Internacional de Futebol Feminino	Brazil	6–0	Costa Rica	Manaus, Brazil
22:45	Andressinha 25'; Tamires 28'; Gabi Zanotti 45', 47'; Bia Zaneratto 53', 73'	Report		Stadium: Arena da Amazônia; Attendance: 4,194; Referee: Raphael Claus (Brazil)

11 December 2016 2016 Torneio Internacional de Futebol Feminino	Brazil	4–0	Russia	Manaus, Brazil
18:45	Bia Zaneratto 11', 49'; Debinha 41', 59'	Report		Stadium: Arena da Amazônia; Referee: Regildenia de Holanda Moura (Brazil)

14 December 2016 2016 Torneio Internacional de Futebol Feminino	Brazil	3–1	Italy	Manaus, Brazil
18:45	Andressinha 29'; Bartoli 79' (o.g.); Debinha 90+1'	Report	Parisi 45+1' (pen.)	Stadium: Arena da Amazônia; Referee: Ricardo Marques Ribeiro (Brazil)

18 December 2016 2016 Torneio Internacional de Futebol Feminino	Brazil	5–3	Italy	Manaus, Brazil
18:45	Bia Zaneratto 8'; Gabi Zanotti 20'; Andressinha 36', 48'; Debinha 60'	Report	Mauro 14'; Gabbiadini 32'; Bonansea 56'	Stadium: Arena da Amazônia; Referee: Ana Karina Marques (Brazil)

=== 2017 ===
9 April 2017 Friendly	Brazil	6–0	Bolivia	Manaus, Brazil
20:30	Francielle 6'; Cristiane 24'; Marta 43'; Bruna Benites 57'; Morón 64' (o.g.); Thaisa 83'	Report		Stadium: Arena da Amazônia; Attendance: 16,198; Referee: Deborah Cecília Cruz Correia (Brazil)

10 June 2017 Friendly	Spain	1–2	Brazil	Fuenlabrada, Spain
18:30	Losada 20' (pen.)	Report	Darlene 76'; Rafaelle 87'	Stadium: Estadio Fernando Torres; Referee: Sandra Braz (Portugal)

13 June 2017 Friendly	Iceland	0–1	Brazil	Reykjavík, Iceland
20:30		Report	Marta 67'	Stadium: Laugardalsvöllur; Referee: Tess Olofsson (Sweden)

4 July 2017 Friendly	Germany	3–1	Brazil	Sandhausen, Germany
15:00	Dallmann 29'; Kayikçi 64'; Maier 77'	Report	Ludmila 48'	Stadium: BWT-Stadion am Hardtwald; Referee: Amy Fearn (England)

27 July 2017 2017 Tournament of Nations	Brazil	1–1	Japan	Seattle, United States
16:15	Camila 87'	Report	Momiki 63'	Stadium: CenturyLink Field; Attendance: 9,725; Referee: Karen Abt (United States)

30 July 2017 2017 Tournament of Nations	United States	4–3	Brazil	San Diego, United States
17:00	Mewis 18'; Press 80'; Rapinoe 85'; Ertz 89'	Report	Andressinha 2', 78'; Bruna Benites 63'	Stadium: Qualcomm Stadium; Attendance: 21,096; Referee: Melissa Borjas (Honduras)

3 August 2017 2017 Tournament of Nations	Australia	6–1	Brazil	Carson, United States
16:15	De Vanna 7', 34'; Foord 32', 68'; Gorry 41'; Kerr 81'	Report	Camila 2'	Stadium: StubHub Center; Attendance: 11,948; Referee: Christina Unkel (United States)

16 September 2017 Friendly	Australia	2–1	Brazil	Penrith, Australia
15:00	De Vanna 40'; Kerr 66'	Report	Debinha 78'	Stadium: Pepper Stadium; Attendance: 15,089; Referee: Anna-Marie Keighley (New Zealand)

19 September 2017 Friendly	Australia	3–2	Brazil	Newcastle, Australia
19:30	Kerr 38', 66'; Foord 47'	Report	Fabiana 1'; Marta 86' (pen.)	Stadium: McDonald Jones Stadium; Attendance: 16,829; Referee: Lara Lee (Australia)

19 October 2017 2017 Yongchuan International Tournament	Brazil	3–0	Mexico	Chongqing, China
16:00	Marta 51'; Bruna Benites 58'; Bia Zaneratto 76'	Report		Stadium: Yongchuan Sports Center; Referee: Gu Chunham (China)

21 October 2017 2017 Yongchuan International Tournament	North Korea	0–2	Brazil	Chongqing, China
16:00		Report	Marta 15', 29'	Stadium: Yongchuan Sports Center; Referee: Law Bik Chi (Hong Kong)

24 October 2017 2017 Yongchuan International Tournament	China	2–2	Brazil	Chongqing, China
19:45	Wang Shanshan 54', 60'	Report	Marta 32' (pen.); Adriana Leal 34'	Stadium: Yongchuan Sports Center; Referee: Law Bik Chi (Hong Kong)

25 November 2017 Friendly	Chile	0–4	Brazil	Ovalle, Chile
		Report	Érika 3'; Rafaelle 5'; Bia Zaneratto 24'; Marta 65' (pen.)	Stadium: Estadio Municipal; Referee: Laura Fortunato (Argentina)

28 November 2017 Friendly	Chile	0–3	Brazil	La Serena, Chile
		Report	Bia Zaneratto 9'; Thaís Guedes 16'; Debinha 26'	Stadium: Estadio La Portada; Referee: Laura Fortunato (Argentina)

=== 2018 ===
5 April 2018 2018 Copa América Femenina Group B	Brazil	3–1	Argentina	Coquimbo, Chile
19:00	Cristiane 57' (pen.); Debinha 90'	Report	Banini 54'	Stadium: Estadio Municipal Francisco Sánchez Rumoroso; Referee: Claudia Umpiérrez (Uruguay)

7 April 2018 2018 Copa América Femenina Group B	Brazil	8–0	Ecuador	Coquimbo, Chile
19:00	Cristiane 10', 90+2'; Bia Zaneratto 21', 81'; Andressinha 48'; Formiga 65'; Rafaelle 70'; Debinha 86'	Report		Stadium: Estadio Municipal Francisco Sánchez Rumoroso; Referee: Dione Rissios (Chile)

11 April 2018 2018 Copa América Femenina Group B	Brazil	4–0	Venezuela	Coquimbo, Chile
19:00	Mônica 10'; Bia Zaneratto 38', 72'; Marta 82'	Report		Stadium: Estadio Municipal Francisco Sánchez Rumoroso; Referee: Olga Miranda (Paraguay)

13 April 2018 2018 Copa América Femenina Group B	Bolivia	0–7	Brazil	Coquimbo, Chile
19:00		Report	Érika 3', 65'; Andressinha 17', 54'; Andressa Alves 41'; Millene 80'; Aline Milene 82'	Stadium: Estadio Municipal Francisco Sánchez Rumoroso; Referee: Elizabeth Tintaya (Peru)

16 April 2018 2018 Copa América Femenina Final stage	Brazil	3–1	Chile	La Serena, Chile
19:00	Mônica 21'; Bia Zaneratto 25'; Thaís Guedes 34'	Report	López 63'	Stadium: Estadio La Portada; Referee: Olga Miranda (Paraguay)

19 April 2018 2018 Copa América Femenina Final stage	Brazil	3–0	Argentina	La Serena, Chile
16:45	Cristiane 47'; Thaisa 52'; Debinha 78'	Report		Stadium: Estadio La Portada; Referee: Susana Corella (Ecuador)

22 April 2018 2018 Copa América Femenina Final stage	Brazil	3–0	Colombia	La Serena, Chile
19:00	Mônica 29', 71'; Clavijo 45+2' (o.g.)	Report		Stadium: Estadio La Portada; Referee: Sirley Cornejo (Bolivia)

26 July 2018 2018 Tournament of Nations	Brazil	1–3	Australia	Kansas City, United States
15:15	Debinha 79'	Report	Poliana 9' (o.g.); Butt 39'; Kerr 50'	Stadium: Children's Mercy Park; Attendance: 10,307; Referee: Christina Unkel (United States)

29 July 2018 2018 Tournament of Nations	Japan	1–2	Brazil	East Hartford, United States
16:15	Masuya 90+3'	Report	Marta 76'; Bia Zaneratto 90'	Stadium: Pratt & Whitney Stadium; Attendance: 13,027; Referee: Katja Koroleva (United States)

2 August 2018 2018 Tournament of Nations	United States	4–1	Brazil	Bridgeview, United States
19:30	Lavelle 33'; Ertz 53'; Heath 61'; Morgan 77'	Report	Davidson 16' (o.g.)	Stadium: Toyota Park; Attendance: 18,309; Referee: Quetzalli Alvarado (Mexico)

2 September 2018 Friendly	Canada	1–0	Brazil	Ottawa, Canada
15:00	Prince 49'	Report		Stadium: TD Place Stadium; Referee: Quetzalli Alvarado (Mexico)

6 October 2018 Friendly	England	1–0	Brazil	Nottingham, England
12:30	Kirby 2'	Report		Stadium: Meadow Lane Stadium; Attendance: 7,864; Referee: Sandra Braz (Portugal)

10 November 2018 Friendly	France	3–1	Brazil	Nice, France
21:00	Cascarino 23'; Bussaglia 47'; Renard 73'	Report	Darlene 90+3'	Stadium: Allianz Riviera; Attendance: 12,073; Referee: Marta Huerta de Aza (Spain)

=== 2019 ===
27 February 2019 2019 SheBelieves Cup	England	2–1	Brazil	Chester, United States
19:00 ET	White 49'; Mead 75'	Report	Andressa Alves 16' (pen.)	Stadium: Talen Energy Stadium; Attendance: 5,954; Referee: Katja Koroleva (United States)

2 March 2019 2019 SheBelieves Cup	Brazil	1–3	Japan	Nashville, United States
13:00 CT	Debinha 57'	Report	Momiki 44'; Kobayashi 81'; Hasegawa 85'	Stadium: Nissan Stadium; Attendance: 12,586; Referee: Karen Abt (United States)

5 March 2019 2019 SheBelieves Cup	United States	1–0	Brazil	Tampa, United States
20:20 ET	Heath 20'	Report		Stadium: Raymond James Stadium; Attendance: 14,009; Referee: Carol Anne Chénard (Canada)

5 April 2019 Friendly	Spain	2–1	Brazil	Don Benito, Spain
17:30	Putellas 61'; Torrecilla 69'	Report	Marta 31'	Stadium: Estadio Vicente Sanz; Attendance: 4,800; Referee: Zulema González (Spain)

8 April 2019 Friendly	Scotland	1–0	Brazil	San Pedro del Pinatar, Spain
	Little 37'	Report		Stadium: Pinatar Arena; Referee: Petra Pavlikova (Slovakia)

9 June 2019 2019 FIFA Women's World Cup Group C	Brazil	3–0	Jamaica	Grenoble, France
15:30	Cristiane 15', 50', 64'	Report		Stadium: Stade des Alpes; Attendance: 17,668; Referee: Riem Hussein (Germany)

13 June 2019 2019 FIFA Women's World Cup Group C	Australia	3–2	Brazil	Montpellier, France
18:00	Foord 45+1'; Logarzo 58'; Mônica 66' (o.g.)	Report	Marta 27' (pen.); Cristiane 38'	Stadium: Stade de la Mosson; Attendance: 17,032; Referee: Esther Staubli (Switzerland)

18 June 2019 2019 FIFA Women's World Cup Group C	Italy	0–1	Brazil	Valenciennes, France
21:00		Report	Marta 74' (pen.)	Stadium: Stade du Hainaut; Attendance: 21,669; Referee: Lucila Venegas (Mexico)

23 June 2019 2019 FIFA Women's World Cup Round of 16	France	2–1 (a.e.t.)	Brazil	Le Havre, France
21:00	Gauvin 52'; Henry 107'	Report	Thaisa 63'	Stadium: Stade Océane; Attendance: 23,965; Referee: Marie-Soleil Beaudoin (Canada)

29 August 2019 2019 Torneio Internacional de Futebol Feminino	Brazil	5–0	Argentina	São Paulo, Brazil
21:30	Ludmila 8'; Formiga 34'; Debinha 35'; Érika 59'; Juncos 82' (o.g.)	Report		Stadium: Estádio do Pacaembu; Attendance: 11,962; Referee: Edina Alves Batista (Brazil)

1 September 2019 2019 Torneio Internacional de Futebol Feminino	Brazil	0–0 (4–5 p)	Chile	São Paulo, Brazil
13:00		Report		Stadium: Estádio do Pacaembu; Attendance: 16,812; Referee: Deborah Cecília Cruz Correia (Brazil)
	Penalties
	Raquel Fernandes (penalty missed); Mônica (penalty scored); Chú (penalty scored); Bia Zaneratto (penalty scored); Luana (penalty missed); Bruna Benites (penalty missed); Fabiana (penalty scored); Joyce (penalty missed)		(penalty scored) Lara; (penalty scored) Balmaceda; (penalty scored) Hidalgo; (penalty missed) Pardo; (penalty missed) Endler; (penalty missed) Roa; (penalty scored) Aedo; (penalty scored) Toro

5 October 2019 Friendly	England	1–2	Brazil	Middlesbrough, England
12:45	England 79'	Report	Debinha 48', 66'	Stadium: Riverside Stadium; Attendance: 29,238; Referee: Riem Hussein (Germany)

8 October 2019 Friendly	Poland	1–3	Brazil	Kielce, Poland
19:15	Mesjasz 59'	Report	Formiga 8'; Tamires 48'; Debinha 78'	Stadium: Kolporter Arena; Referee: Olga Zadinová (Czech Republic)

7 November 2019 2019 Yongchuan International Tournament	Brazil	4–0	Canada	Chongqing, China
16:00	Chú 12'; Formiga 23'; Bia Zaneratto 41', 57'	Report		Stadium: Yongchuan Sports Center; Attendance: 4,823; Referee: Cha Min-ji (South Korea)

10 November 2019 2019 Yongchuan International Tournament	Brazil	0–0 (2–4 p)	China	Chongqing, China
19:35		Report		Stadium: Yongchuan Sports Center; Attendance: 20,367; Referee: Kim Yu-Jeong (South Korea)
	Penalties
	Tamires (penalty missed); Aline Milene (penalty scored); Raquel Fernandes (penalty scored); Andressinha (penalty missed)		(penalty scored) Wang Shuang; (penalty scored) Tang Jiali; (penalty scored) Liu Shanshan; (penalty scored) Wu Haiyan

12 December 2019 Friendly	Brazil	6–0	Mexico	São Paulo, Brazil
21:00	Duda Francelino 9'; Debinha 40'; Bia Zaneratto 71', 82', 90'; Millene 87'	Report		Stadium: Arena Corinthians; Attendance: 4,493; Referee: Thayslane Melo Costa (Brazil)

15 December 2019 Friendly	Brazil	4–0	Mexico	Araraquara, Brazil
18:30	Cristiane 9', 38'; Debinha 26'; Vic Albuquerque 74'	Report		Stadium: Fonte Luminosa; Attendance: 5,384; Referee: Rejane Caetano da Silva (Brazil)
