= Football at the 2016 Summer Olympics – Women's tournament – Group E =

Group E of the women's football tournament at the 2016 Summer Olympics was played from 3 to 9 August 2016, and included hosts Brazil, China, South Africa and Sweden. The top two teams advanced to the knockout stage, while the third-placed team also advanced if they were among the two best third-placed teams among all three groups.

All times are BRT (UTC−3). For matches in Manaus, which is in AMT (UTC−4), local times are listed in parentheses.

== Teams ==
Draw position	Team	Confederation	Method of qualification	Date of qualification	Olympic appearance	Last appearance	Previous best performance	FIFA Rankings at start of event
E1	Brazil	CONMEBOL	Hosts	2 October 2009	6th	2012	Silver medal (2004, 2008)	8
E2	China	AFC	AFC Qualifying 2nd place	7 March 2016	5th	2008	Silver medal (1996)	12
E3	Sweden	UEFA	UEFA Qualifying 1st place	9 March 2016	6th	2012	Fourth place (2004)	6
E4	South Africa	CAF	CAF Qualifying winners	18 October 2015	2nd	2012	Group stage (2012)	52

== Standings ==
Pos	Team	Pld	W	D	L	GF	GA	GD	Pts	Qualification
1	Brazil (H)	3	2	1	0	8	1	+7	7	Quarter-finals
2	China	3	1	1	1	2	3	−1	4	Quarter-finals
3	Sweden	3	1	1	1	2	5	−3	4	Quarter-finals
4	South Africa	3	0	1	2	0	3	−3	1	

Source: Rio2016 & FIFA
Rules for classification: Tiebreakers
(H) Hosts

== Matches ==
=== Sweden vs South Africa ===
3 August 2016
13:00

Sweden	1–0	South Africa
Fischer 76'	Report (Rio2016); Report (FIFA); Report

Estádio Olímpico João Havelange, Rio de Janeiro
Attendance: 13,439
Referee: Teodora Albon (Romania)

Sweden	South Africa

GK	1	Hedvig Lindahl
DF	3	Linda Sembrant
DF	5	Nilla Fischer
DF	6	Magdalena Ericsson
DF	15	Jessica Samuelsson
MF	7	Lisa Dahlkvist	(substituted off) 46'
MF	9	Kosovare Asllani
MF	17	Caroline Seger
FW	8	Lotta Schelin (c)
FW	10	Sofia Jakobsson	(substituted off) 69'
FW	13	Fridolina Rolfö	(substituted off) 76'
Substitutions:
MF	16	Elin Rubensson	(substituted on) 46'
FW	11	Stina Blackstenius	(substituted on) 69'
FW	12	Olivia Schough	(substituted on) 76'
Manager:
Pia Sundhage

GK	1	Roxanne Barker
DF	2	Lebogang Ramalepe	(substituted off) 83'
DF	3	Nothando Vilakazi
DF	4	Noko Matlou
DF	5	Janine van Wyk (c)
MF	6	Mamello Makhabane
MF	7	Stephanie Malherbe
MF	9	Amanda Dlamini
MF	15	Refiloe Jane
FW	11	Shiwe Nongwanya	(substituted off) 40'
FW	12	Jermaine Seoposenwe
Substitutions:
MF	10	Linda Motlhalo	(substituted on) 40'
FW	14	Sanah Mollo	(substituted on) 83'
Manager:
Vera Pauw

Assistant referees:
Petruța Iugulescu (Romania)
Mária Súkeníková (Slovakia)
Fourth official:
Claudia Umpierrez (Uruguay)

=== Brazil vs China PR ===
3 August 2016
16:00

Brazil	3–0	China
Mônica 36'; Andressa 59'; Cristiane 90'	Report (Rio2016); Report (FIFA)

Estádio Olímpico João Havelange, Rio de Janeiro
Attendance: 27,618
Referee: Carol Chenard (Canada)

Brazil	China PR

GK	1	Bárbara
DF	2	Fabiana	(substituted off) 85'
DF	3	Monica
DF	4	Rafaelle
DF	6	Tamires
MF	5	Thaisa	(substituted off) 58'
MF	8	Formiga
MF	10	Marta (c)	(substituted off) 80'
FW	9	Andressa Alves
FW	11	Cristiane
FW	16	Beatriz
Substitutions:
MF	17	Andressa	(substituted on) 58'
FW	7	Debina	(substituted on) 80'
DF	12	Poliana	(substituted on) 85'
Manager:
Vadão

GK	1	Zhao Lina
DF	2	Liu Shanshan
DF	5	Wu Haiyan	(yellow card) 22'
DF	6	Li Dongna (c)
DF	14	Zhao Rong
MF	8	Tan Ruyin
MF	13	Pang Fengyue
MF	15	Zhang Rui
FW	10	Yang Li
FW	11	Wang Shanshan		(substituted off) 64'
FW	12	Wang Shuang		(substituted off) 79'
Substitutions:
FW	9	Ma Xiaoxu		(substituted on) 64'
FW	17	Gu Yasha		(substituted on) 79'
Manager:
Bruno Bini

Assistant referees:
Marie-Josée Charbonneau (Canada)
Suzanne Morisset (Canada)
Fourth official:
Gladys Lengwe (Zambia)

=== South Africa vs China PR ===
6 August 2016
19:00

South Africa	0–2	China
	Report (Rio2016); Report (FIFA)	Gu Yasha 45+1'; Tan Ruyin 87'

Estádio Olímpico João Havelange, Rio de Janeiro
Attendance: 25,000
Referee: Esther Staubli (Switzerland)

South Africa	China PR

GK	1	Roxanne Barker
DF	2	Lebogang Ramalepe
DF	3	Nothando Vilakazi
DF	4	Noko Matlou	(yellow card) 72'
DF	5	Janine van Wyk (c)
MF	6	Mamello Makhabane		(substituted off) 80'
MF	7	Stephanie Malherbe
MF	10	Linda Motlhalo
MF	15	Refiloe Jane
FW	12	Jermaine Seoposenwe
FW	20	Thembi Kgatlana		(substituted off) 84'
Substitutions:
MF	18	Nompumelelo Nyandeni		(substituted on) 80'
FW	14	Sanah Mollo		(substituted on) 84'
Manager:
Vera Pauw

GK	1	Zhao Lina
DF	2	Liu Shanshan
DF	4	Gao Chen
DF	6	Li Dongna (c)
DF	14	Zhao Rong	(substituted off) 29'
MF	8	Tan Ruyin
MF	13	Pang Fengyue
MF	15	Zhang Rui
FW	10	Yang Li	(substituted off) 65'
FW	12	Wang Shuang
FW	17	Gu Yasha
Substitutions:
DF	5	Wu Haiyan	(substituted on) 29'
FW	11	Wang Shanshan	(substituted on) 65'
Manager:
Bruno Bini

Assistant referees:
Lucie Ratajová (Czech Republic)
Chrysoula Kourompylia (Greece)
Fourth official:
Carol Chenard (Canada)

=== Brazil vs Sweden ===
6 August 2016
22:00

Brazil	5–1	Sweden
Beatriz 21', 86'; Cristiane 24'; Marta 44' (pen.), 80'	Report (Rio2016); Report (FIFA); Report	Schelin 89'

Estádio Olímpico João Havelange, Rio de Janeiro
Attendance: 43,384
Referee: Lucila Venegas (Mexico)

Brazil	Sweden

GK	1	Bárbara
DF	2	Fabiana	(substituted off) 83'
DF	3	Monica
DF	4	Rafaelle
DF	6	Tamires
MF	5	Thaisa
MF	8	Formiga	(substituted off) 56'
MF	10	Marta (c)
FW	9	Andressa Alves
FW	11	Cristiane	(substituted off) 66'
FW	16	Beatriz
Substitutions:
MF	17	Andressa	(substituted on) 56'
FW	7	Debina	(substituted on) 66'
DF	12	Poliana	(substituted on) 83'
Manager:
Vadão

GK	1	Hedvig Lindahl
DF	4	Emma Berglund
DF	5	Nilla Fischer
DF	6	Magdalena Ericsson	(yellow card) 44'	(substituted off) 46'
MF	7	Lisa Dahlkvist
MF	9	Kosovare Asllani	(yellow card) 49'	(substituted off) 74'
MF	16	Elin Rubensson
MF	17	Caroline Seger (c)
FW	8	Lotta Schelin
FW	10	Sofia Jakobsson
FW	13	Fridolina Rolfö		(substituted off) 64'
Substitutions:
DF	2	Jonna Andersson		(substituted on) 46'
FW	12	Olivia Schough		(substituted on) 64'
MF	14	Emilia Appelqvist		(substituted on) 64'
Manager:
Pia Sundhage

Assistant referees:
Enedina Caudillo (Mexico)
Mayte Chávez (Mexico)
Fourth official:
Rita Gani (Malaysia)

=== South Africa vs Brazil ===
9 August 2016
22:00 (21:00 UTC–4)

South Africa	0–0	Brazil
	Report (Rio2016); Report (FIFA)

Arena da Amazônia, Manaus
Attendance: 38,415
Referee: Stéphanie Frappart (France)

South Africa	Brazil

GK	1	Roxanne Barker
DF	3	Nothando Vilakazi	(yellow card) 57'
DF	4	Noko Matlou
DF	5	Janine van Wyk (c)
DF	17	Leandra Smeda
MF	6	Mamello Makhabane
MF	7	Stephanie Malherbe
MF	10	Linda Motlhalo		(substituted off) 65'
MF	15	Refiloe Jane
FW	12	Jermaine Seoposenwe
FW	20	Thembi Kgatlana		(substituted off) 83'
Substitutions:
FW	14	Sanah Mollo		(substituted on) 65'
MF	9	Amanda Dlamini		(substituted on) 83'
Manager:
Vera Pauw

GK	18	Aline
DF	3	Monica
DF	6	Tamires		(substituted off) 46'
DF	12	Poliana
DF	14	Bruna (c)	(yellow card) 39'
MF	5	Thaisa		(substituted off) 83'
MF	13	Érika
MF	17	Andressa	(yellow card) 44'
FW	7	Debinha
FW	9	Andressa Alves
FW	15	Raquel Fernandes
Substitutions:
MF	10	Marta		(substituted on) 46'
DF	2	Fabiana		(substituted on) 83'
Manager:
Vadão

Assistant referees:
Manuela Nicolosi (France)
Yolanda Parga (Spain)
Fourth official:
María Carvajal (Chile)

=== China PR vs Sweden ===
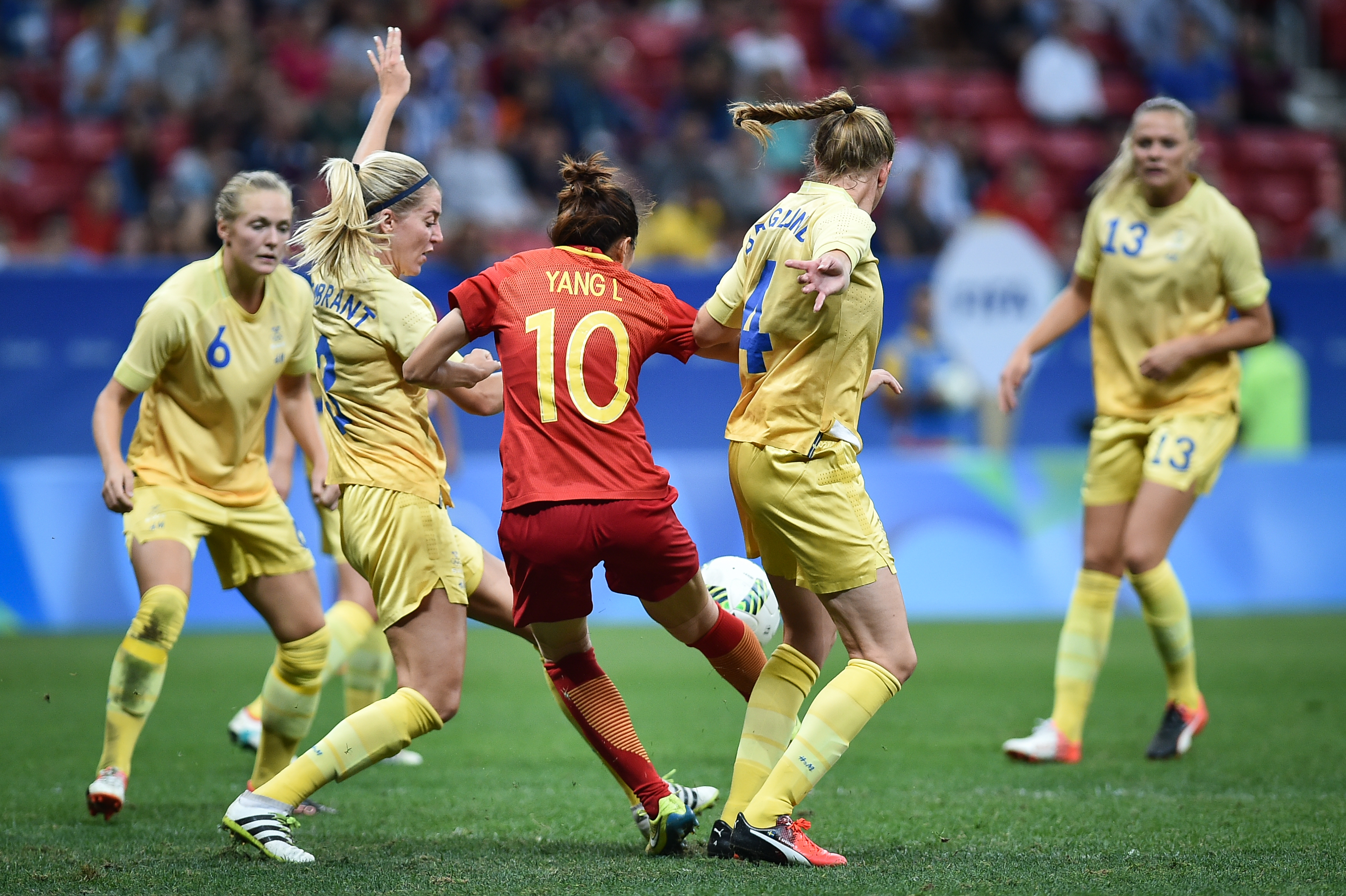

9 August 2016
22:00

China	0–0	Sweden
	Report (Rio2016); Report (FIFA); Report

Estádio Nacional Mané Garrincha, Brasília
Attendance: 7,648
Referee: Olga Miranda (Paraguay)

China PR	Sweden

GK	1	Zhao Lina
DF	2	Liu Shanshan
DF	4	Gao Chen
DF	5	Wu Haiyan
DF	6	Li Dongna (c)
MF	8	Tan Ruyin
MF	13	Pang Fengyue	(yellow card) 90+2'
MF	15	Zhang Rui
FW	10	Yang Li
FW	12	Wang Shuang		(substituted off) 83'
FW	17	Gu Yasha		(substituted off) 89'
Substitutions:
FW	11	Wang Shanshan		(substituted on) 83'
MF	7	Li Ying		(substituted on) 89'
Manager:
Bruno Bini

GK	1	Hedvig Lindahl
DF	3	Linda Sembrant
DF	5	Nilla Fischer	(substituted off) 78'
DF	6	Magdalena Ericsson
DF	15	Jessica Samuelsson
MF	7	Lisa Dahlkvist	(substituted off) 62'
MF	16	Elin Rubensson
MF	17	Caroline Seger
FW	8	Lotta Schelin (c)
FW	12	Olivia Schough
FW	13	Fridolina Rolfö
Substitutions:
MF	9	Kosovare Asllani	(substituted on) 62'
DF	4	Emma Berglund	(substituted on) 78'
Manager:
Pia Sundhage

Assistant referees:
Mariana de Almeida (Argentina)
Yoleida Lara (Venezuela)
Fourth official:
Carol Chenard (Canada)
