= Football at the 2016 Summer Olympics – Women's tournament – Knockout stage =

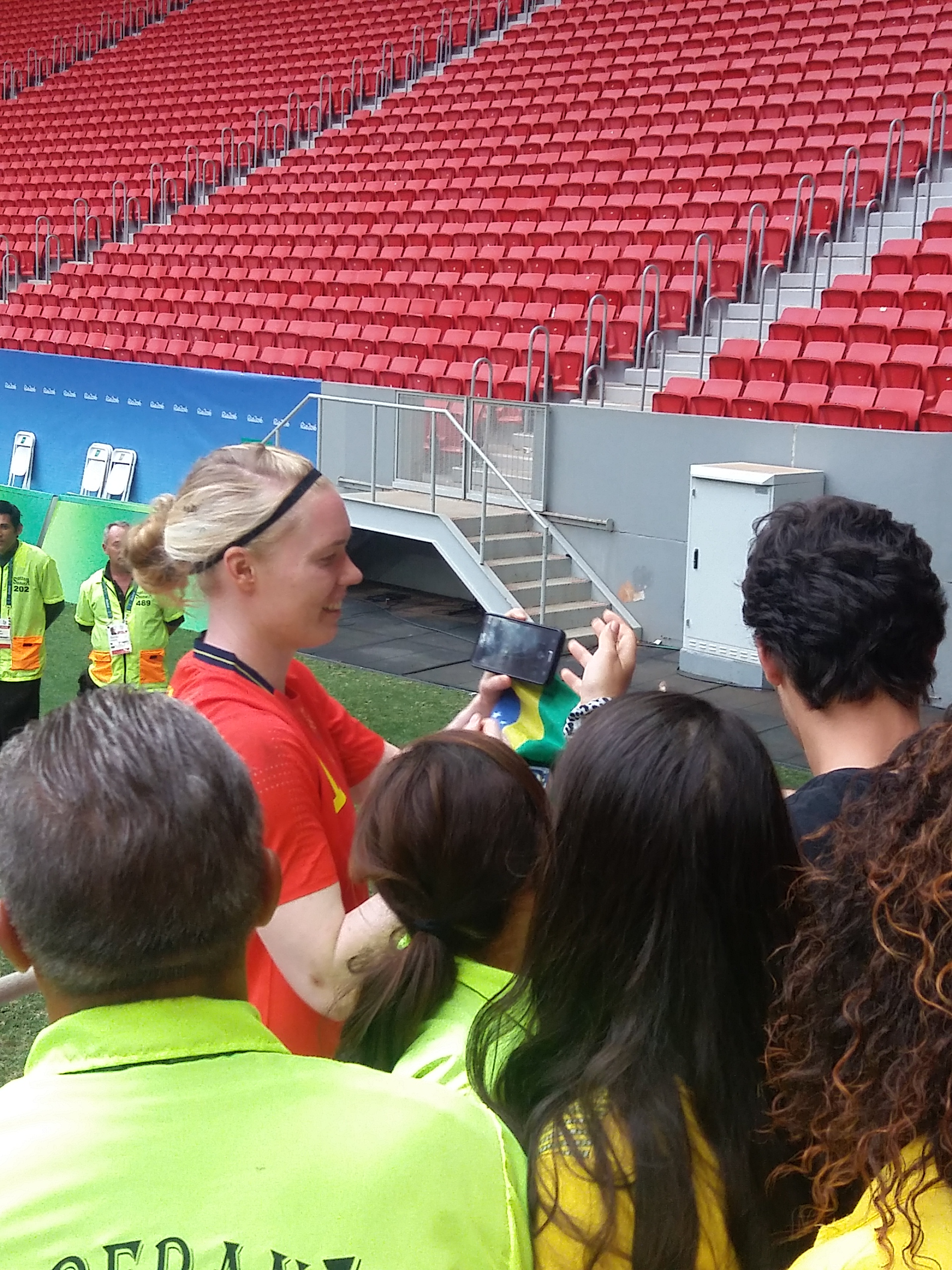
Hedvig Lindahl greets fans at Estádio Nacional Mané Garrincha after the USA vs Sweden match.

The knockout stage of the women's football tournament at the 2016 Summer Olympics was played from 12 to 19 August 2016. The top two teams from each group in the group stage and the two best third-placed teams qualified for the knockout stage.

All times are local, BRT (UTC−3).

== Qualified teams ==
Group	Winners	Runners-up	Third place (best two)
E	Brazil	China	Sweden
F	Canada	Germany	Australia
G	United States	France	—N/a

== Bracket ==
In the knockout stages, if a match is level at the end of normal playing time, extra time is played (two periods of 15 minutes each) and followed, if necessary, by a penalty shoot-out to determine the winner.

On 18 March 2016, the FIFA Executive Committee agreed that the competition would be part of the International Football Association Board's trial to allow a fourth substitute to be made during extra time.

Quarter-finals
12 August — Belo Horizonte
Brazil (p)	0 (7)
Australia	0 (6)
12 August — Brasília
United States	1 (3)
Sweden (p)	1 (4)
12 August — São Paulo
Canada	1
France	0
12 August — Salvador
China	0
Germany	1

Semi-finals
16 August — Rio de Janeiro (Maracanã)
Brazil	0 (3)
Sweden (p)	0 (4)
16 August — Belo Horizonte
Canada	0
Germany	2

Gold medal match
19 August — Rio de Janeiro (Maracanã)
Sweden	1
Germany	2
Bronze medal match
19 August — São Paulo
Brazil	1
Canada	2

== Quarter-finals ==
=== United States vs Sweden ===
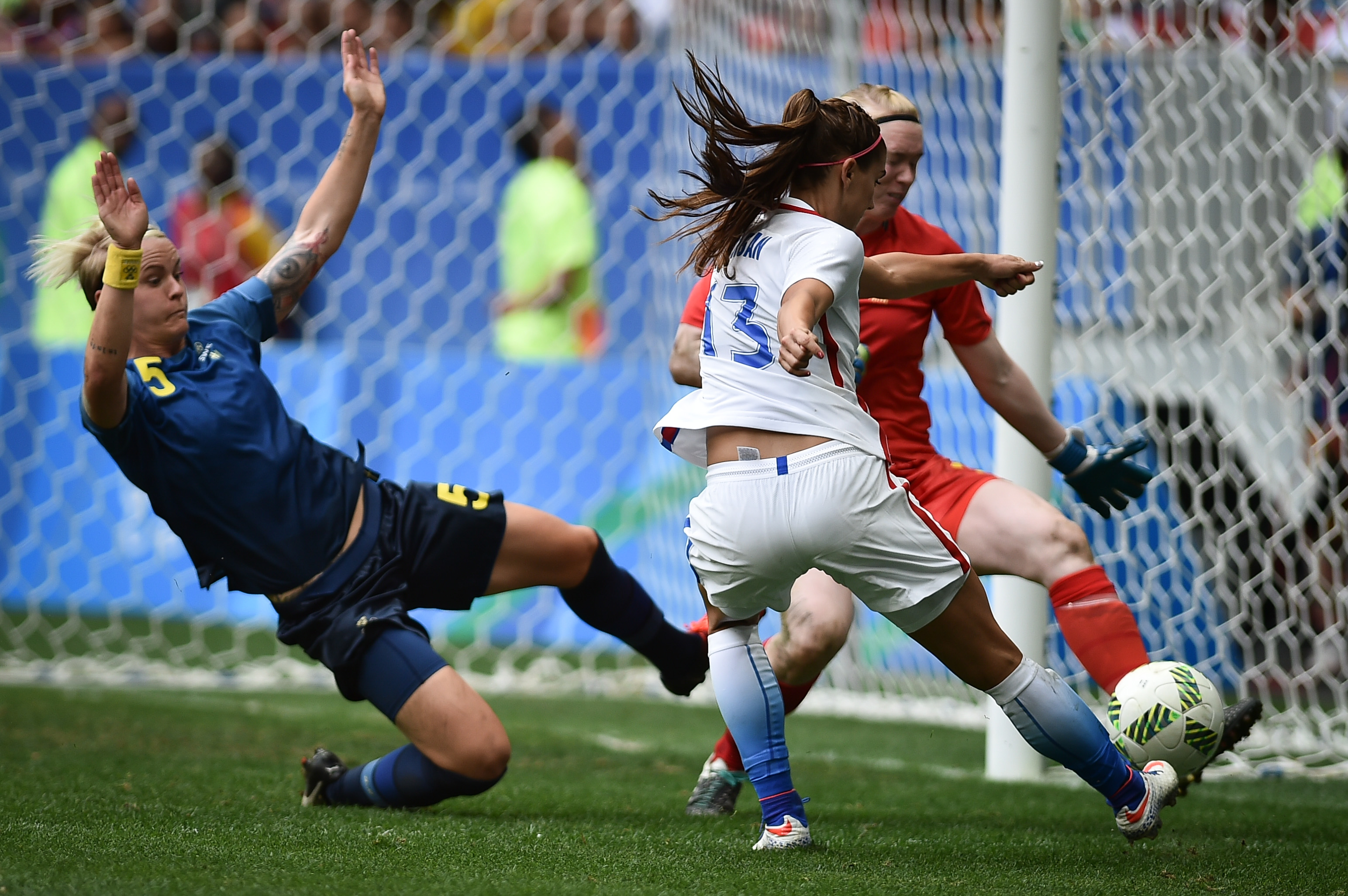

12 August 2016
13:00

United States	1–1 (a.e.t.)	Sweden
Morgan 77'	Report (Rio2016); Report (FIFA); Report	Blackstenius 61'
Penalties
Morgan (penalty missed); Horan (penalty scored); Lloyd (penalty scored); Brian (penalty scored); Press (penalty missed)	3–4	(penalty scored) Schelin; (penalty scored) Asllani; (penalty missed) Sembrant; (penalty scored) Seger; (penalty scored) Dahlkvist

Estádio Nacional Mané Garrincha, Brasília
Attendance: 13,892
Referee: Anna-Marie Keighley (New Zealand)

United States	Sweden

GK	1	Hope Solo
DF	4	Becky Sauerbrunn
DF	5	Kelley O'Hara		(substituted off) 72'
DF	7	Meghan Klingenberg
DF	8	Julie Johnston
MF	3	Allie Long		(substituted off) 65'
MF	10	Carli Lloyd (c)	(yellow card) 110'
MF	14	Morgan Brian
MF	17	Tobin Heath
FW	2	Mallory Pugh		(substituted off) 114'
FW	13	Alex Morgan
Substitutions:
FW	16	Crystal Dunn		(substituted on) 65'
MF	15	Megan Rapinoe	(substituted on) 72'	(substituted off) 99'
FW	12	Christen Press		(substituted on) 99'
MF	9	Lindsey Horan		(substituted on) 114'
Manager:
Jill Ellis

GK	1	Hedvig Lindahl
DF	3	Linda Sembrant
DF	5	Nilla Fischer
DF	15	Jessica Samuelsson		(substituted off) 119'
MF	7	Lisa Dahlkvist
MF	9	Kosovare Asllani
MF	16	Elin Rubensson		(substituted off) 71'
MF	17	Caroline Seger (c)	(yellow card) 78'
FW	8	Lotta Schelin	(yellow card) 57'
FW	10	Sofia Jakobsson		(substituted off) 91'
FW	13	Fridolina Rolfö		(substituted off) 18'
Substitutions:
FW	11	Stina Blackstenius		(substituted on) 18'
DF	6	Magdalena Ericsson		(substituted on) 71'
FW	12	Olivia Schough		(substituted on) 91'
DF	4	Emma Berglund		(substituted on) 119'
Manager:
Pia Sundhage

Assistant referees:
Sarah Jones (New Zealand)
Lata Kaumatule (Tonga)
Fourth official:
Rita Gani (Malaysia)

=== China PR vs Germany ===
12 August 2016
16:00

China	0–1	Germany
	Report (Rio2016); Report (FIFA)	Behringer 76'

Itaipava Arena Fonte Nova, Salvador
Attendance: 9,642
Referee: Kateryna Monzul (Ukraine)

China PR	Germany

GK	1	Zhao Lina
DF	2	Liu Shanshan
DF	4	Gao Chen
DF	5	Wu Haiyan
DF	6	Li Dongna (c)
MF	8	Tan Ruyin
MF	13	Pang Fengyue		(substituted off) 79'
MF	15	Zhang Rui
FW	10	Yang Li		(substituted off) 46'
FW	12	Wang Shuang
FW	17	Gu Yasha
Substitutions:
FW	11	Wang Shanshan	(red card) 57'	(substituted on) 46'
FW	9	Ma Xiaoxu		(substituted on) 79'

GK	1	Almuth Schult
DF	3	Saskia Bartusiak (c)
DF	4	Leonie Maier	(yellow card) 83'
DF	5	Annike Krahn
DF	12	Tabea Kemme
MF	7	Melanie Behringer
MF	13	Sara Däbritz
MF	16	Melanie Leupolz		(substituted off) 69'
FW	9	Alexandra Popp		(substituted off) 90'
FW	10	Dzsenifer Marozsán		(substituted off) 88'
FW	11	Anja Mittag
Substitutions:
FW	19	Svenja Huth	(yellow card) 86'	(substituted on) 69'
MF	8	Lena Goeßling		(substituted on) 88'
MF	15	Mandy Islacker		(substituted on) 90'

Assistant referees:
Nataliya Rachynska (Ukraine)
Sanja Rođak-Karšić (Croatia)
Fourth official:
Esther Staubli (Switzerland)

=== Canada vs France ===
12 August 2016
19:00

Canada	1–0	France
Schmidt 56'	Report (Rio2016); Report (FIFA)

Arena Corinthians, São Paulo
Attendance: 38,688
Referee: Claudia Umpierrez (Uruguay)

Canada	France

GK	1	Stephanie Labbé
DF	2	Allysha Chapman		(substituted off) 45+1'
DF	3	Kadeisha Buchanan	(yellow card) 49'
DF	4	Shelina Zadorsky
DF	10	Ashley Lawrence
MF	8	Diana Matheson		(substituted off) 69'
MF	11	Desiree Scott
MF	13	Sophie Schmidt	(yellow card) 57'	(substituted off) 81'
MF	17	Jessie Fleming
FW	16	Janine Beckie
FW	12	Christine Sinclair (c)
Substitutions:
DF	9	Josée Bélanger		(substituted on) 45+1'
FW	6	Deanne Rose		(substituted on) 69'
MF	5	Quinn (Note: Then known as Rebecca Quinn)		(substituted on) 81'
Manager:
John Herdman

GK	16	Sarah Bouhaddi
DF	2	Griedge Mbock Bathy
DF	3	Wendie Renard (c)
DF	4	Sakina Karchaoui		(substituted off) 84'
DF	7	Amel Majri
DF	8	Jessica Houara
MF	6	Amandine Henry	(yellow card) 85'
MF	10	Camille Abily
MF	15	Élise Bussaglia		(substituted off) 62'
FW	9	Eugénie Le Sommer
FW	13	Kadidiatou Diani		(substituted off) 71'
Substitutions:
MF	14	Louisa Necib		(substituted on) 62'
FW	12	Élodie Thomis		(substituted on) 71'
MF	11	Claire Lavogez		(substituted on) 84'
Manager:
Philippe Bergeroo

Assistant referees:
Loreto Toloza (Chile)
Neuza Back (Brazil)
Fourth official:
María Carvajal (Chile)

=== Brazil vs Australia ===
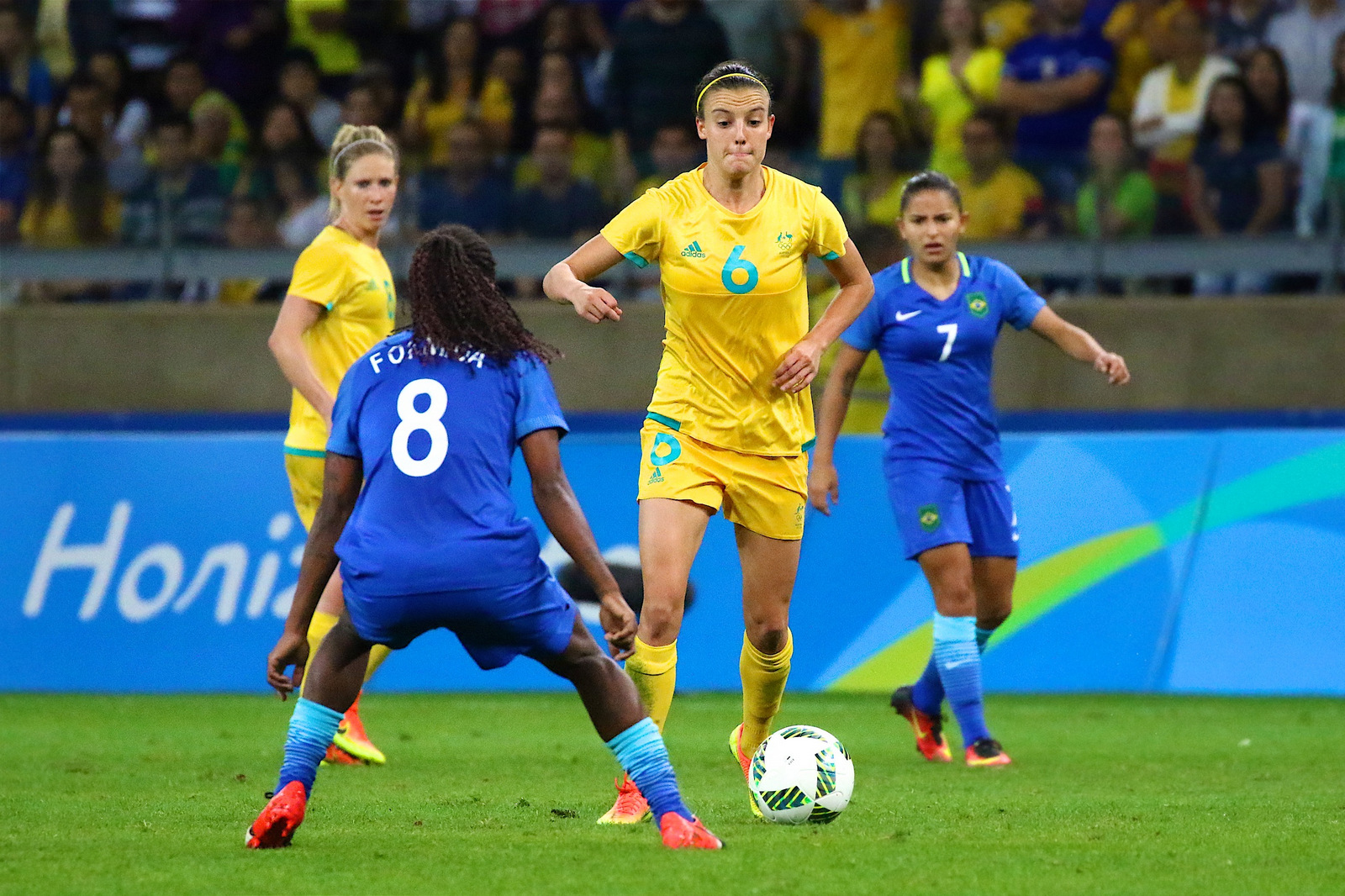

12 August 2016
22:00

Brazil	0–0 (a.e.t.)	Australia
	Report (Rio2016); Report (FIFA)
Penalties
Andressa Alves (penalty scored); Andressinha (penalty scored); Beatriz (penalty scored); Rafaelle (penalty scored); Marta (penalty missed); Debinha (penalty scored); Mônica (penalty scored); Tamires (penalty scored)	7–6	(penalty scored) Kellond-Knight; (penalty scored) Alleway; (penalty scored) Van Egmond; (penalty scored) Polkinghorne; (penalty missed) Gorry; (penalty scored) Heyman; (penalty scored) Logarzo; (penalty missed) Kennedy

Mineirão, Belo Horizonte
Attendance: 52,660
Referee: Carol Chenard (Canada)

Brazil	Australia

GK	1	Bárbara
DF	2	Fabiana		(substituted off) 61'
DF	3	Monica
DF	4	Rafaelle
DF	6	Tamires	(yellow card) 52'
MF	5	Thaisa		(substituted off) 116'
MF	8	Formiga
MF	10	Marta (c)	(yellow card) 77'
FW	7	Debinha
FW	9	Andressa Alves	(yellow card) 90+2'
FW	16	Beatriz
Substitutions:
DF	12	Poliana		(substituted on) 61'
MF	17	Andressa		(substituted on) 116'
Manager:
Vadão

GK	1	Lydia Williams
DF	5	Laura Alleway	(yellow card) 33'
DF	7	Steph Catley		(substituted off) 20'
DF	14	Alanna Kennedy	(yellow card) 81'
MF	3	Katrina Gorry
MF	8	Elise Kellond-Knight
MF	9	Caitlin Foord	(yellow card) 69'
MF	10	Emily van Egmond
FW	11	Lisa De Vanna (c)		(substituted off) 75'
FW	15	Samantha Kerr		(substituted off) 105'
FW	17	Kyah Simon		(substituted off) 60'
Substitutions:
MF	6	Chloe Logarzo		(substituted on) 20'
FW	16	Michelle Heyman		(substituted on) 60'
DF	4	Clare Polkinghorne		(substituted on) 75'
FW	2	Larissa Crummer		(substituted on) 105'
Manager:
Alen Stajcic

Assistant referees:
Marie-Josée Charbonneau (Canada)
Suzanne Morisset (Canada)
Fourth official:
Melissa Borjas (Honduras)

== Semi-finals ==
=== Brazil vs Sweden ===
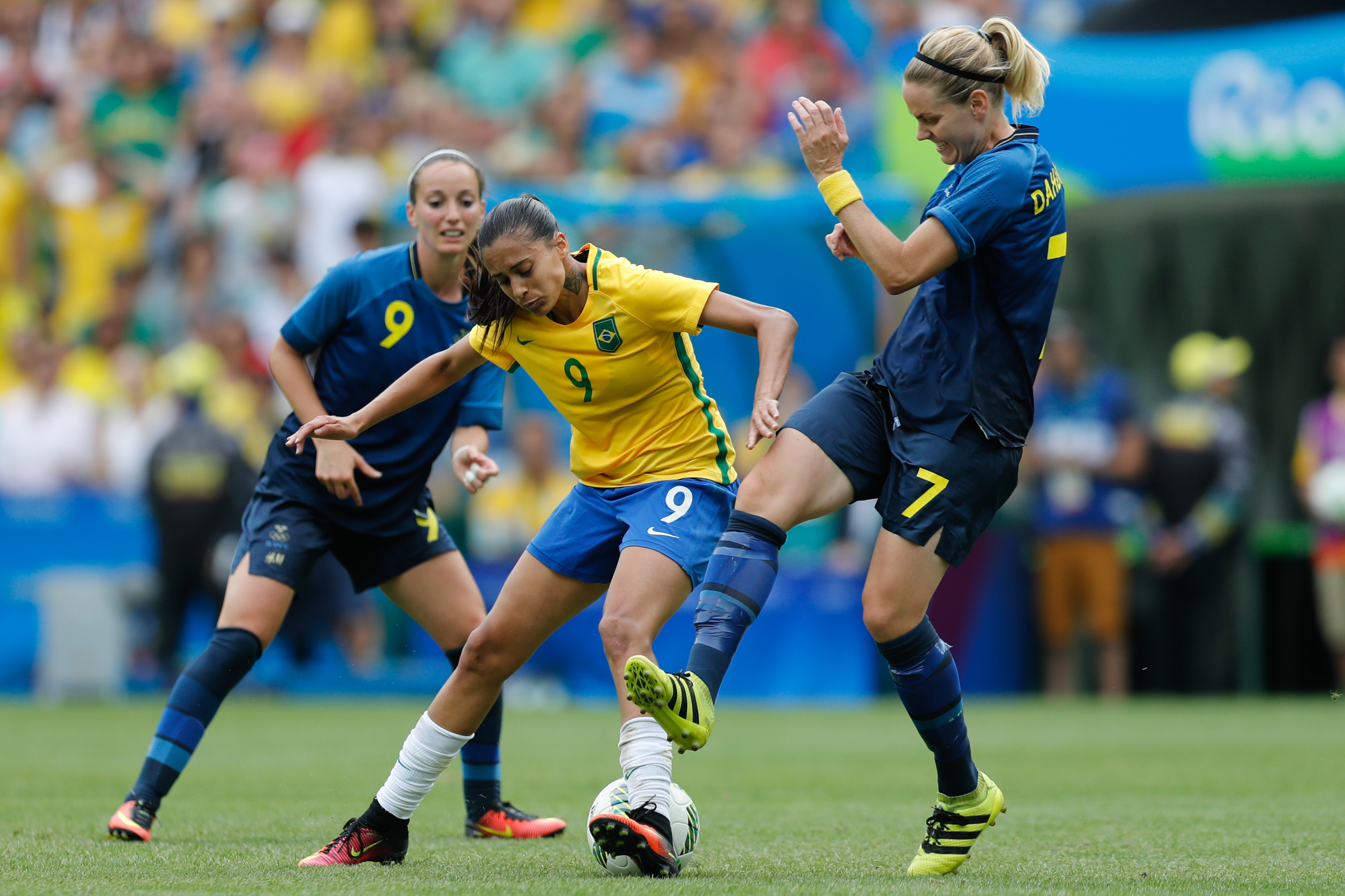

16 August 2016
13:00

Brazil	0–0 (a.e.t.)	Sweden
	Report (Rio2016); Report (FIFA); Report
Penalties
Marta (penalty scored); Cristiane (penalty missed); Andressa Alves (penalty scored); Rafaelle (penalty scored); Andressinha (penalty missed)	3–4	(penalty scored) Schelin; (penalty missed) Asllani; (penalty scored) Seger; (penalty scored) Fischer; (penalty scored) Dahlkvist

Maracanã Stadium, Rio de Janeiro
Attendance: 70,454
Referee: Lucila Venegas (Mexico)

Brazil	Sweden

GK	1	Bárbara
DF	3	Monica
DF	4	Rafaelle
DF	6	Tamires
DF	12	Poliana
MF	5	Thaisa		(substituted off) 46'
MF	8	Formiga	(yellow card) 87'
MF	10	Marta (c)
FW	7	Debinha		(substituted off) 91'
FW	9	Andressa Alves
FW	16	Beatriz	(yellow card) 65'	(substituted off) 100'
Substitutions:
MF	17	Andressa		(substituted on) 46'
FW	11	Cristiane		(substituted on) 91'
FW	15	Raquel Fernandes		(substituted on) 100'
Manager:
Vadão

GK	1	Hedvig Lindahl
DF	3	Linda Sembrant
DF	5	Nilla Fischer
DF	15	Jessica Samuelsson		(substituted off) 120+1'
MF	7	Lisa Dahlkvist	(yellow card) 116'
MF	9	Kosovare Asllani
MF	14	Emilia Appelqvist		(substituted off) 104'
MF	16	Elin Rubensson
MF	17	Caroline Seger
FW	8	Lotta Schelin (c)
FW	11	Stina Blackstenius		(substituted off) 61'
Substitutions:
FW	10	Sofia Jakobsson	(yellow card) 76'	(substituted on) 61'
FW	12	Olivia Schough		(substituted on) 104'
DF	4	Emma Berglund		(substituted on) 120+1'
Manager:
Pia Sundhage

Assistant referees:
Mayte Chávez (Mexico)
Enedina Caudillo (Mexico)
Fourth official:
Melissa Borjas (Honduras)

=== Canada vs Germany ===
16 August 2016
16:00

Canada	0–2	Germany
	Report (Rio2016); Report (FIFA)	Behringer 21' (pen.); Däbritz 59'

Mineirão, Belo Horizonte
Attendance: 5,641
Referee: Ri Hyang-ok (North Korea)

Canada	Germany

GK	1	Stephanie Labbé
DF	3	Kadeisha Buchanan	(yellow card) 20'
DF	4	Shelina Zadorsky
DF	7	Rhian Wilkinson		(substituted off) 60'
DF	10	Ashley Lawrence	(yellow card) 55'
MF	11	Desiree Scott		(substituted off) 74'
MF	13	Sophie Schmidt
MF	17	Jessie Fleming
FW	12	Christine Sinclair (c)
FW	14	Melissa Tancredi	(yellow card) 66'	(substituted off) 85'
FW	16	Janine Beckie
Substitutions:
MF	8	Diana Matheson		(substituted on) 60'
FW	6	Deanne Rose		(substituted on) 74'
FW	15	Nichelle Prince		(substituted on) 85'
Manager:
John Herdman

GK	1	Almuth Schult
DF	3	Saskia Bartusiak (c)
DF	4	Leonie Maier
DF	5	Annike Krahn
DF	12	Tabea Kemme
MF	7	Melanie Behringer
MF	13	Sara Däbritz
MF	16	Melanie Leupolz
FW	9	Alexandra Popp	(substituted off) 90+2'
FW	10	Dzsenifer Marozsán	(substituted off) 46'
FW	11	Anja Mittag	(substituted off) 80'
Substitutions:
MF	8	Lena Goeßling	(substituted on) 46'
MF	17	Isabel Kerschowski	(substituted on) 80'
FW	15	Mandy Islacker	(substituted on) 90+2'
Manager:
Silvia Neid

Assistant referees:
Hong Kum-nyo (North Korea)
Allyson Flynn (Australia)
Fourth official:
María Carvajal (Chile)

== Bronze medal match ==
19 August 2016
13:00

Brazil	1–2	Canada
Beatriz 79'	Report (Rio2016); Report (FIFA)	Rose 25'; Sinclair 52'

Arena Corinthians, São Paulo
Attendance: 39,718
Referee: Teodora Albon (Romania)

Brazil	Canada

GK	1	Bárbara
DF	2	Fabiana
DF	3	Monica
DF	4	Rafaelle	(yellow card) 87'
DF	6	Tamires		(substituted off) 63'
MF	5	Thaisa
MF	8	Formiga
MF	10	Marta (c)	(yellow card) 49'
FW	9	Andressa Alves	(yellow card) 43'	(substituted off) 57'
FW	11	Cristiane		(substituted off) 46'
FW	16	Beatriz
Substitutions:
FW	7	Debinha		(substituted on) 46'
DF	12	Poliana		(substituted on) 57'
DF	13	Érika		(substituted on) 63'
Manager:
Vadão

GK	1	Stephanie Labbé
DF	3	Kadeisha Buchanan
DF	4	Shelina Zadorsky
DF	9	Josée Bélanger
DF	10	Ashley Lawrence
MF	8	Diana Matheson	(substituted off) 66'
MF	11	Desiree Scott
MF	17	Jessie Fleming
FW	6	Deanne Rose	(substituted off) 59'
FW	12	Christine Sinclair (c)
FW	14	Melissa Tancredi	(substituted off) 69'
Substitutions:
DF	2	Allysha Chapman	(substituted on) 59'
MF	13	Sophie Schmidt	(substituted on) 66'
FW	16	Janine Beckie	(substituted on) 69'
Manager:
John Herdman

Assistant referees:
Petruța Iugulescu (Romania)
Mária Súkeníková (Slovakia)
Fourth official:
Esther Staubli (Switzerland)

== Gold medal match ==
19 August 2016
17:30

Sweden	1–2	Germany
Blackstenius 67'	Report (Rio2016); Report (FIFA); Report	Marozsán 48'; Sembrant 62' (o.g.)

Maracanã Stadium, Rio de Janeiro
Attendance: 52,432
Referee: Carol Chenard (Canada)

Sweden	Germany

GK	1	Hedvig Lindahl
DF	3	Linda Sembrant	(yellow card) 83'
DF	5	Nilla Fischer
DF	15	Jessica Samuelsson
MF	7	Lisa Dahlkvist
MF	9	Kosovare Asllani		(substituted off) 68'
MF	16	Elin Rubensson	(yellow card) 51'	(substituted off) 70'
MF	17	Caroline Seger (c)
FW	8	Lotta Schelin
FW	10	Sofia Jakobsson	(yellow card) 22'	(substituted off) 55'
FW	12	Olivia Schough
Substitutions:
FW	11	Stina Blackstenius		(substituted on) 55'
FW	19	Pauline Hammarlund		(substituted on) 68'
DF	6	Magdalena Ericsson		(substituted on) 70'
Manager:
Pia Sundhage

GK	1	Almuth Schult
DF	3	Saskia Bartusiak (c)
DF	4	Leonie Maier
DF	5	Annike Krahn
DF	12	Tabea Kemme
MF	7	Melanie Behringer	(substituted off) 70'
MF	13	Sara Däbritz	(substituted off) 83'
MF	16	Melanie Leupolz
FW	9	Alexandra Popp
FW	10	Dzsenifer Marozsán
FW	11	Anja Mittag
Substitutions:
MF	8	Lena Goeßling	(substituted on) 70'
FW	19	Svenja Huth	(substituted on) 83'
Manager:
Silvia Neid

Assistant referees:
Marie-Josée Charbonneau (Canada)
Suzanne Morisset (Canada)
Fourth official:
Olga Miranda (Paraguay)
