= Olímpica de Engenho de Dentro station =

Metro station in Rio de Janeiro, Brazil

Olímpica de Engenho de Dentro Station
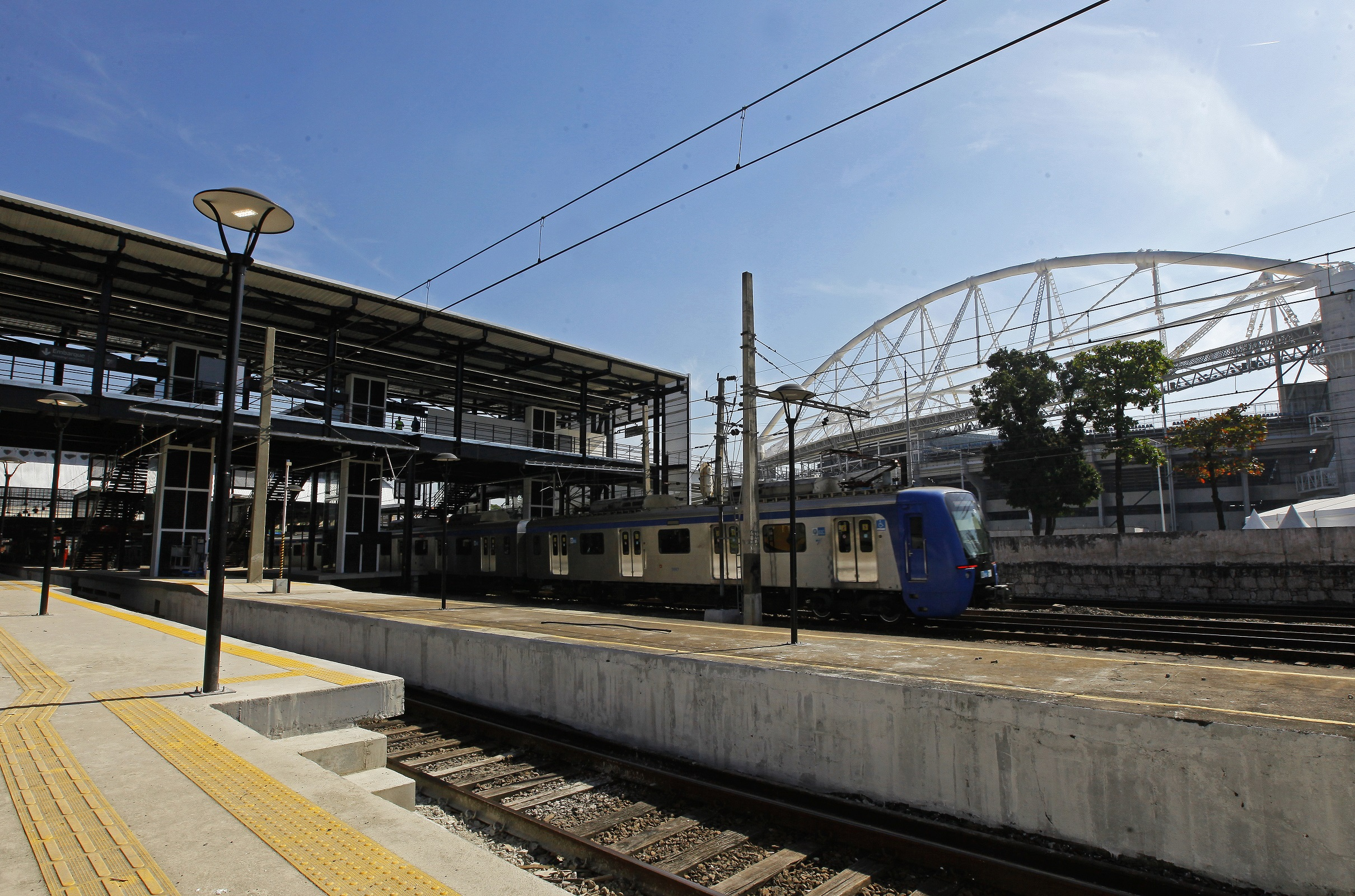

General information
- Other names: Engenho de Dentro Station
- Location: Rua Arquias Cordeiro, Engenho de Dentro, Rio de Janeiro; Brazil
- Coordinates: 22.895525°S 43.293803°W
- System: Commuter rail
- Operator: SuperVia
- Lines: SuperVia; Japeri, Santa Cruz, Deodoro Lines
- Platforms: 5

Construction
- Accessible: yes

History
- Opened: 1873

Services
Preceding station	SuperVia	Following station
Méier towards Central	Deodoro	Piedade towards Deodoro
Silva Freire towards Central	Japeri	Cascadura towards Japeri
Silva Freire towards Central	Santa Cruz	Cascadura towards Santa Cruz
Location
- Location within Rio de Janeiro

Olímpica de Engenho de Dentro Station is a railway station on the SuperVia network in Rio de Janeiro. The station services the Estádio Olímpico Nilton Santos.

From Central do Brasil Station, passengers can reach Olímpica de Engenho de Dentro Station in 25 minutes taking the Japeri, Santa Cruz or Deodoro lines.
