= Tan Ruyin =

Chinese footballer

Tan Ruyin 谭茹殷
Personal information
- Full name: Tan Ruyin
- Date of birth: 17 July 1994 (age 32)
- Place of birth: Zhanjiang, Guangdong, China
- Height: 1.67 m (5 ft 6 in)
- Position: Midfielder

Senior career*
Years	Team	Apps	(Gls)
2020–2022	Guangdong R&F	17	(2)

International career^{‡}
2013–2014	China U-20	6	(0)
2014–	China	53	(1)
- * Club domestic league appearances and goals as of 8 June 2019 ‡ National team caps and goals as of 8 June 2019

Tan Ruyin (simplified Chinese: 谭茹殷; traditional Chinese: 譚茹殷; pinyin: Tán Rúyīn; born 17 July 1994) is a Chinese footballer who plays as a midfielder.

== International goals ==
No.	Date	Venue	Opponent	Score	Result	Competition
1.	6 August 2016	Estádio Olímpico João Havelange, Rio de Janeiro, Brazil	South Africa	2–0	2–0	2016 Summer Olympics
