= Roxanne Barker =

South African soccer player

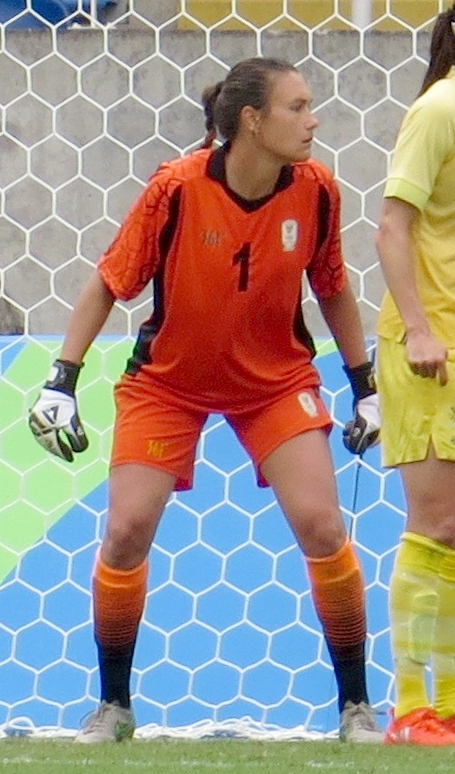
- Barker at the 2016 Olympics

Personal information
- Full name: Roxanne Kimberly Barker
- Date of birth: 6 May 1991 (age 35)
- Place of birth: Pietermaritzburg, South Africa
- Height: 1.80 m (5 ft 11 in)
- Position: Goalkeeper

Team information
- Current team: SC Heerenveen

Youth career
- So Cal Blues
- So Cal Wolfpack

College career
Years	Team	Apps	(Gls)
2009–2012	Pepperdine Waves	79	(0)

Senior career*
Years	Team	Apps	(Gls)
2011	Pali Blues	9	
2013	Portland Thorns	0	(0)
2013	Pali Blues	28	(0)
2013–2014	Maties FC		(0)
2014–2015	Þór/KA	35	(0)
2016–	SC Heerenveen	0	(0)

International career
2010–	South Africa	28	(0)
- * Club domestic league appearances and goals as of 6 August 2016

Roxanne Kimberly Barker (born 6 May 1991) is a South African soccer player who plays as a goalkeeper for Dutch club SC Heerenveen and the South Africa women's national team.

== Early life ==
=== Pepperdine University ===
Barker trained at the university level in the United States playing for the Pepperdine University women's college soccer team.

== Playing career ==
=== Club ===
After completing her studies, Barker was selected by Portland Thorns FC in the 2013 NWSL College Draft. Portland Thorns preferred Adelaide Gay as understudy to their experienced goalkeeper Karina LeBlanc.

Barker played for the W-League club Pali Blues during her university holidays.

She then returned to South Africa and played ten games for Maties FC, before taking up a professional contract in Iceland.

Earlier in her career, Barker had played as a centre-back for Durban Ladies FC as well as in the position of goalkeeper.

Barker signed up with the Icelandic Úrvalsdeild club Þór/KA for the 2014 and 2015 seasons. Roxy won Most Valuable Player for the Icelandic Úrvalsdeild club Þór/KA 2015 season. She signed with SC Heerenveen vrouwen in the Dutch league for the 2016–2017 season.

=== International ===
Barker made her South Africa debut in a 6–0 win over Tanzania in July 2010. She represented the senior national team (also known as "Banyana Banyana") at the 2012 London Olympics.

Barker had represented South Africa in 28 games when she was called into the squad for the 2016 Rio Olympics.
