= Estádio Olímpico Nilton Santos =

Stadium in Rio de Janeiro, Brazil

Coordinates: 22°53′35″S 43°17′32″W

- Nilton Santos

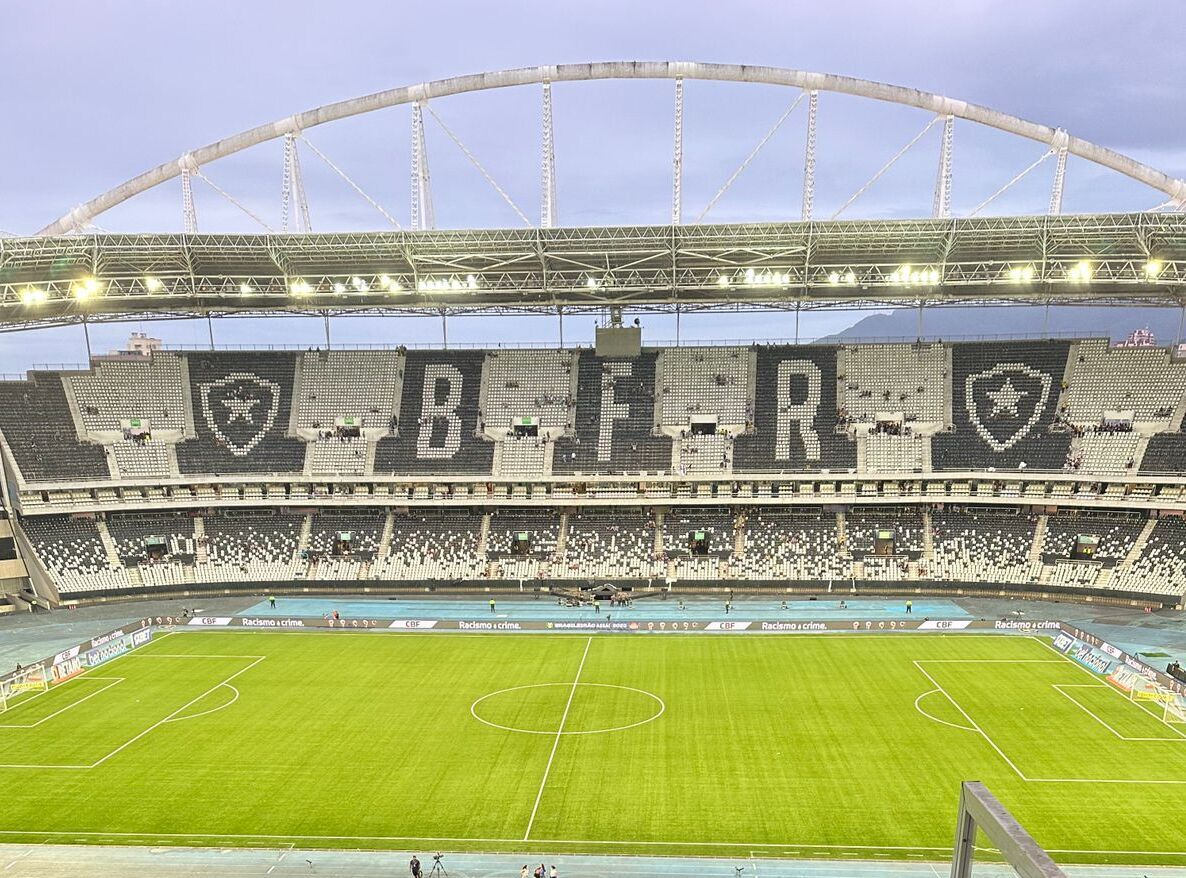
- Inside the stadium
- Interactive map of Estádio Olímpico Nilton Santos
- Location: Rio de Janeiro, Brazil
- Owner: Rio de Janeiro City Hall
- Operator: Botafogo FR
- Capacity: 46,931; 60,000 (2016 Olympics and Paralympics); 70,000 (concert)
- Surface: Artificial turf
- Field size: 105 m × 68 m (344 ft × 223 ft)
- Public transit: SuperVia: Japeri, Santa Cruz or Deodoro Lines at Central do Brasil to Olímpica de Engenho de Dentro station

Construction
- Built: 2003–2007
- Opened: 2007, 2016
- Cost: R$380 million (US$192 million)
- Architect: Carlos Porto

Tenants
- Botafogo (2007–present); Brazil national football team (selected matches)

Estádio Olímpico Nilton Santos (English: Nilton Santos Olympic Stadium) is a stadium located in the neighbourhood of Engenho de Dentro, in Rio de Janeiro, Brazil. It is owned by Rio de Janeiro City Hall and is the home stadium of Botafogo FR. It is used mostly for football matches and it hosted the athletics competitions at the 2016 Summer Olympics and the 2016 Summer Paralympics. The stadium was built from 2003 through to 2007, opening in time for the 2007 Pan American Games. The stadium was one of the five venues for the 2021 Copa América.

The stadium is known as Nilton Santos or as the nickname Engenhão ([ẽʒeˈɲɐ̃w]), that refers to the location of the stadium in neighbourhood of Engenho de Dentro. The previous name of the stadium was Estádio João Havelange. In 2015 the name changed for Estádio Nilton Santos. The name honors Nílton Santos, who spent his whole career with Botafogo and is regarded as one of the greatest defenders in the history of the game and a member of the World Team of the 20th Century. In February 2017, the city of Rio de Janeiro officially renamed the stadium to Estádio Olímpico Nilton Santos. The stadium's capacity was increased to 60,000 for the Games. Nilton Santos is one of the 10 biggest stadiuns of Brazilian Série A. According to an exclusive survey conducted by BolaVip Brasil, Nilton Santos Stadium, leads the Série A ranking with 185 bars and restaurants within a 2km radius. It is the best-served stadium in the country in this regard and one of the best places for the pre-game with the fans.

== History ==
=== Construction and opening ===
The stadium cost R$380 million (US$192 million) to build, which was six times the stadium's original construction budget of R$60,000,000 The Mayor's office estimated in 2003 that the total construction cost would be of R$60 million (US$30 million); the actual cost was thus 533% higher than early estimates.

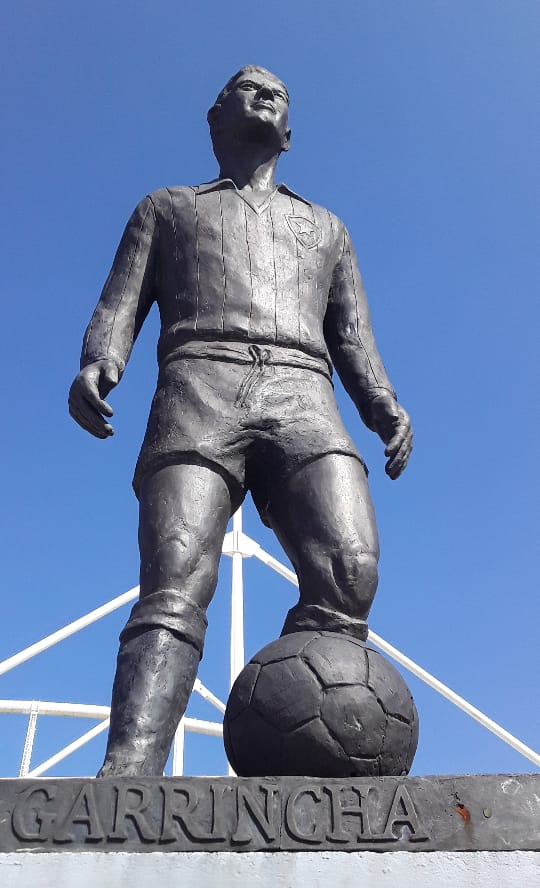
Monument in honor of Garrincha, idol of Botafogo and the Brazilian National Team, at the entrance to the Nilton Santos stadium.

The stadium opened on 30 June 2007. The first match held was a Campeonato Brasileiro Série A game between Botafogo and Fluminense. 40,000 tickets were available for the match and were exchanged for donations of powdered milk. In all, 43,810 people were at the stadium to watch the inaugurating match, where Botafogo beat Fluminense 2–1. The first goal of the match was scored by Fluminense's Alex Dias. As Dias scored the first goal in the stadium's history, he was awarded the Valdir Pereira Trophy (Taça Valdir Pereira), which was named after retired footballer Didi. Because Botafogo won the stadium's inaugural match, the club was awarded the João Havelange Trophy (Taça João Havelange).

=== Pan American Games, Botafogo, and the Olympics ===
During the course of the 2007 Pan American Games held in Rio de Janeiro in July, the stadium hosted athletics competitions, in addition to twelve games of the first stage of the men's and women's football tournaments. After the conclusion of the games, on 3 August 2007, Botafogo de Futebol e Regatas signed a deal with the City of Rio de Janeiro to lease the stadium for 20 years. Botafogo was the only organization to present a bid; the club agreed to pay $18.200 (or R$36.000) a month to lease Engenhão, plus maintenance costs which run at $2 million (or R$4 million) annually. On 11 August 2007, a 15-meter long and 6-meter high stadium wall collapsed, but nobody was hurt. On 10 September 2008, the Brazilian national team played for the first time at the Engenhão. The match, against Bolivia, for 2010 World Cup Qualification, ended 0–0.

The stadium remains owned by the City of Rio de Janeiro, but it has been leased to Botafogo until at least 2051 (20 years). The Engenhão was the main venue for top football competitions in Rio de Janeiro while the Maracanã Stadium was being renovated in preparation for both the 2014 FIFA World Cup and 2016 Summer Olympics. Flamengo and Fluminense played their home matches at the Engenhão from the 2010–11 through 2012–13 seasons. The stadium was closed during two years in March 2013 after it was found the structural integrity of the roof was not up to standard. It was announced on 8 June 2013, that the stadium would need a minimum of 18 months of reconstruction work and remain closed until 2015 while the repairs were carried out to the roof. The Stadium was reopened since 2015 for the Olympic Games Rio 2016

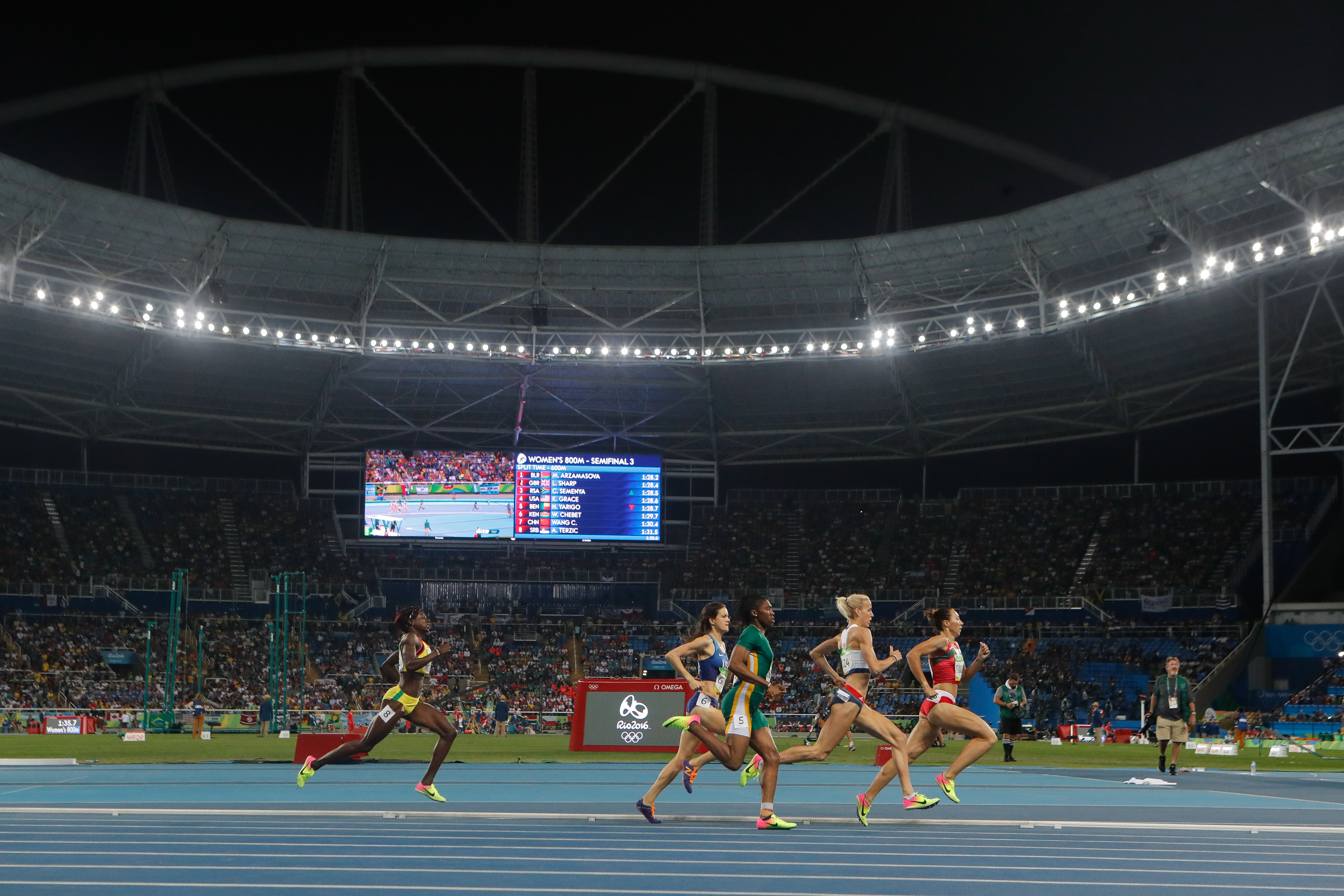
Nilton Santos Stadium in Rio 2016 Olympics

=== Biggest audiences ===
These are the ten biggest crowds at the Nilton Santos Stadium, in Botafogo games

Nº	Total audience	Paying audience	Team 1	Game score	Team 2	Competition	Date	Ref.
1	43 810	40 000	Botafogo	2–1	Fluminense	Campeonato Brasileiro	30/06/2007	
2	43 071	38 951	Botafogo	4–1	Coritiba	Campeonato Brasileiro	30/07/2023	
3	42 982	39 393	Botafogo	5–0	(Uruguay) Peñarol	Copa Libertadores	23/10/2024	
4	42 000	36 995	Botafogo	4–0	Ceará	Campeonato Brasileiro	07/09/2011	
5	41 986	36 967	Botafogo	2–1	São Paulo	Campeonato Brasileiro	08/12/2024	
6	41 899	N/A	Botafogo	0–0	Cuiabá	Campeonato Brasileiro	09/11/2024	
7	41 387	35 321	Botafogo	3–1	Vasco	Campeonato Carioca	29/04/2012	
8	40 769	38 346	Botafogo	1–2	Flamengo	Campeonato Brasileiro	02/09/2023	
9	40 089	37 037	Botafogo	0–0	São Paulo	Copa Libertadores	18/09/2024	
10	40 050	36 133	Botafogo	2–0	(Uruguay) Nacional	Copa Libertadores	10/08/2017	

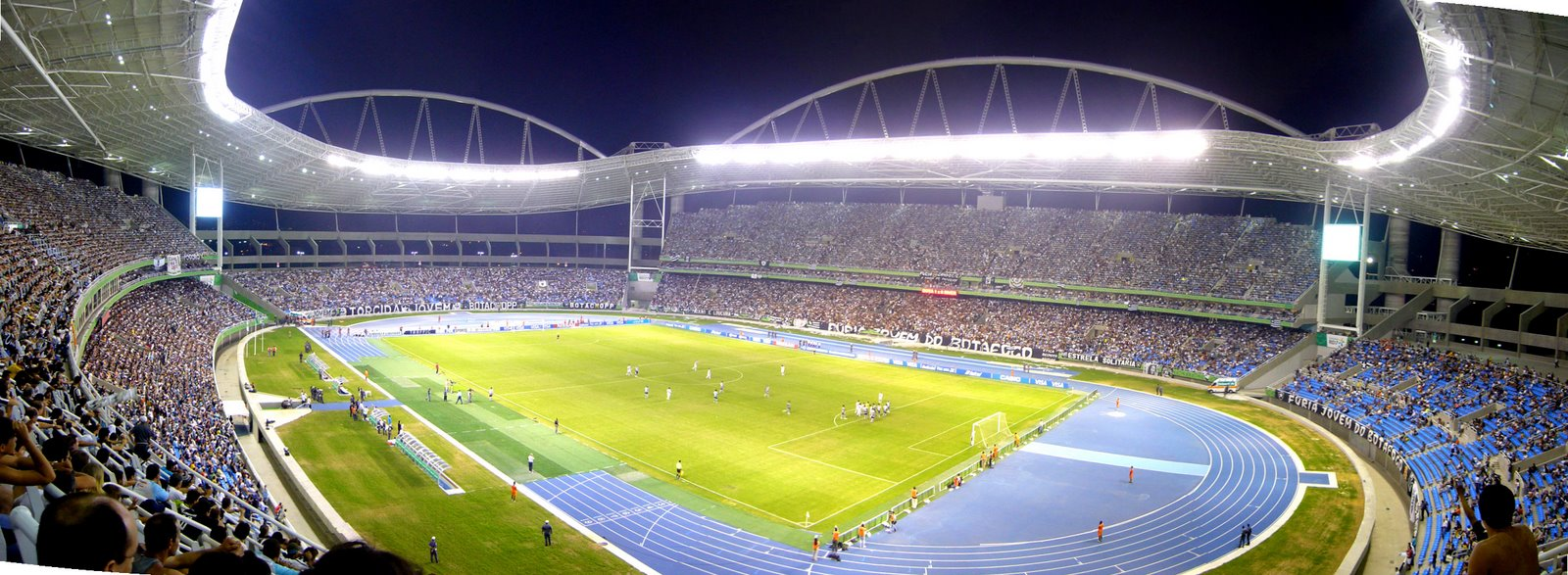
Nilton Santos Stadium

== Transportation ==
From Zona Sul (South Zone), Downtown, Tijuca or Barra, passengers can go to Central do Brasil subway and train station, and from there reach Nilton Santos stadium in 25 minutes taking the Japeri, Santa Cruz or Deodoro lines, leaving the train in Olímpica de Engenho de Dentro station. To go back Downtown, Zona Sul, Tijuca or Barra, the fans must leave the stadium and go to the west sector with the south sector (Rua José dos Reis with Rua Arquias Cordeiro), continue to the station (Olímpica de Engenho de Dentro) and take the train to Central do Brasil.

System Map

Line	Termini
Deodoro	Central do Brasil ↔ Deodoro
Santa Cruz	Central do Brasil ↔ Santa Cruz
Japeri	Central do Brasil ↔ Japeri

== Tournament results ==
=== 2016 Summer Olympics ===
Date	Time (UTC-03)	Team #1	Result	Team #2	Round	Attendance
3 August 2016	13:00	Sweden	1–0	South Africa	Group E	13,439
3 August 2016	16:00	Brazil	3–0	China	Group E	27,618
4 August 2016	15:00	Honduras	3–2	Algeria	Group D	20,000
4 August 2016	18:00	Portugal	2–0	Argentina	Group D	37,407
6 August 2016	19:00	South Africa	0–2	China	Group E	25,000
6 August 2016	22:00	Brazil	5–1	Sweden	Group E	43,384
7 August 2016	15:00	Honduras	1–2	Portugal	Group D	32,928
7 August 2016	18:00	Argentina	2–1	Algeria	Group D	37,450

=== 2021 Copa América ===
Date	Time (UTC-03)	Team #1	Result	Team #2	Round	Attendance
14 June 2021	18:00	Argentina	1–1	Chile	Group A	0
17 June 2021	21:00	Brazil	4–0	Peru	Group B	0
20 June 2021	18:00	Venezuela	2–2	Ecuador	Group B	0
23 June 2021	21:00	Brazil	2–1	Colombia	Group B	0
28 June 2021	21:00	Uruguay	1–0	Paraguay	Group A	0
2 July 2021	21:00	Brazil	1–0	Chile	Quarter-finals	0
5 July 2021	20:00	Brazil	1–0	Peru	Semi-finals	0

== Concerts ==
List of concerts at Estádio Olímpico Nilton Santos, showing date, artist, event, attendance and notes
Date	Artist	Tour / concert name	Attendance	Notes
May 22, 2011	Paul McCartney	Up and Coming Tour	—	—
May 23, 2011	Paul McCartney	Up and Coming Tour	—	—
October 5, 2011	Justin Bieber	My World Tour	46,533	—
October 6, 2011	Justin Bieber	My World Tour	46,533	—
March 29, 2012	Roger Waters	The Wall Live	43,046	—
November 15, 2016	Guns N' Roses	Not in This Lifetime... Tour	50,234	—
March 25, 2023	Coldplay	Music of the Spheres World Tour	211,012	First act to perform three shows on a single tour and biggest attendance ever.
March 26, 2023	Coldplay	Music of the Spheres World Tour	211,012	First act to perform three shows on a single tour and biggest attendance ever.
March 28, 2023	Coldplay	Music of the Spheres World Tour	211,012	First act to perform three shows on a single tour and biggest attendance ever.
October 7, 2023	The Weeknd	After Hours til Dawn Tour	71,363	Biggest single-day attendance.
October 28, 2023	Roger Waters	This Is Not a Drill	—	—
November 4, 2023	Red Hot Chili Peppers	Global Stadium Tour	—	—
November 9, 2023	RBD	Soy Rebelde Tour	128,565	First Latin act to perform two shows on a single tour.
November 10, 2023	RBD	Soy Rebelde Tour	128,565	First Latin act to perform two shows on a single tour.
November 17, 2023	Taylor Swift	The Eras Tour	—	First female headliner at the stadium and first solo act to perform three shows on a single tour.
November 19, 2023	Taylor Swift	The Eras Tour	—	First female headliner at the stadium and first solo act to perform three shows on a single tour.
November 20, 2023 (Note: Originally scheduled for November 18, 2023; but was postponed due to extreme heat and the death of Ana Clara Benevides)	Taylor Swift	The Eras Tour	—	First female headliner at the stadium and first solo act to perform three shows on a single tour.
October 16, 2024	Bruno Mars	Bruno Mars Live		First male solo act to perform three shows on a single tour.
October 19, 2024	Bruno Mars	Bruno Mars Live		First male solo act to perform three shows on a single tour.
October 20, 2024	Bruno Mars	Bruno Mars Live		First male solo act to perform three shows on a single tour.
February 11, 2025	Shakira	Las Mujeres Ya No Lloran World Tour	35,180	First Spanish speaking act to perform a solo show on a single tour.
April 1, 2025	Stray Kids	Dominate World Tour	55,000	First K-POP group to perform on a single tour.
April 19, 2025	Thiaguinho	Tardezinha	—	—
May 08, 2025	System of a Down	Wake Up!	—	—
April 26, 2026	The Weeknd	After Hours til Dawn Tour	—	—

== Gallery ==
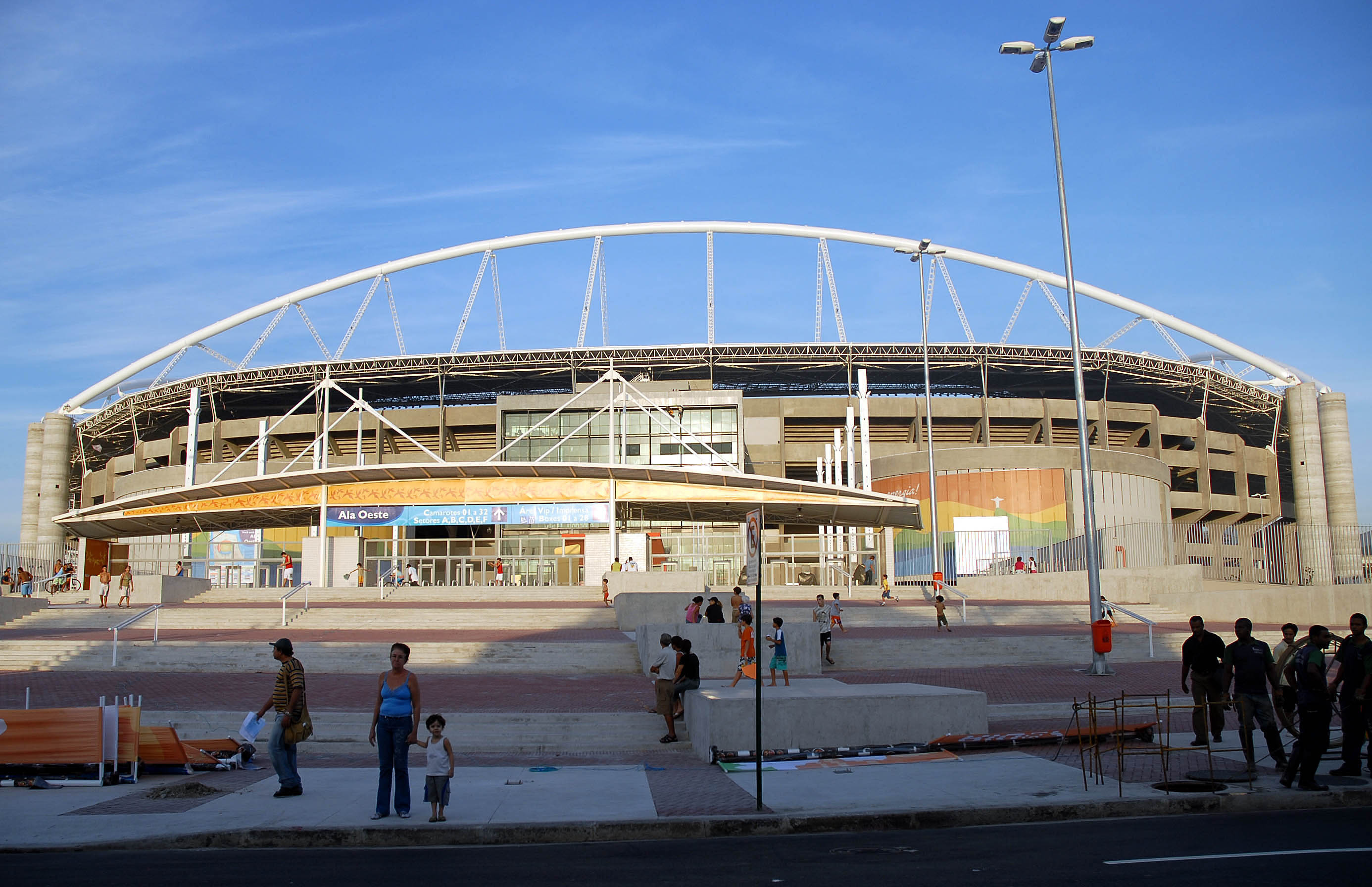
Exterior shot of the stadium during the 2007 Pan American Games, looking from the east, July 2007

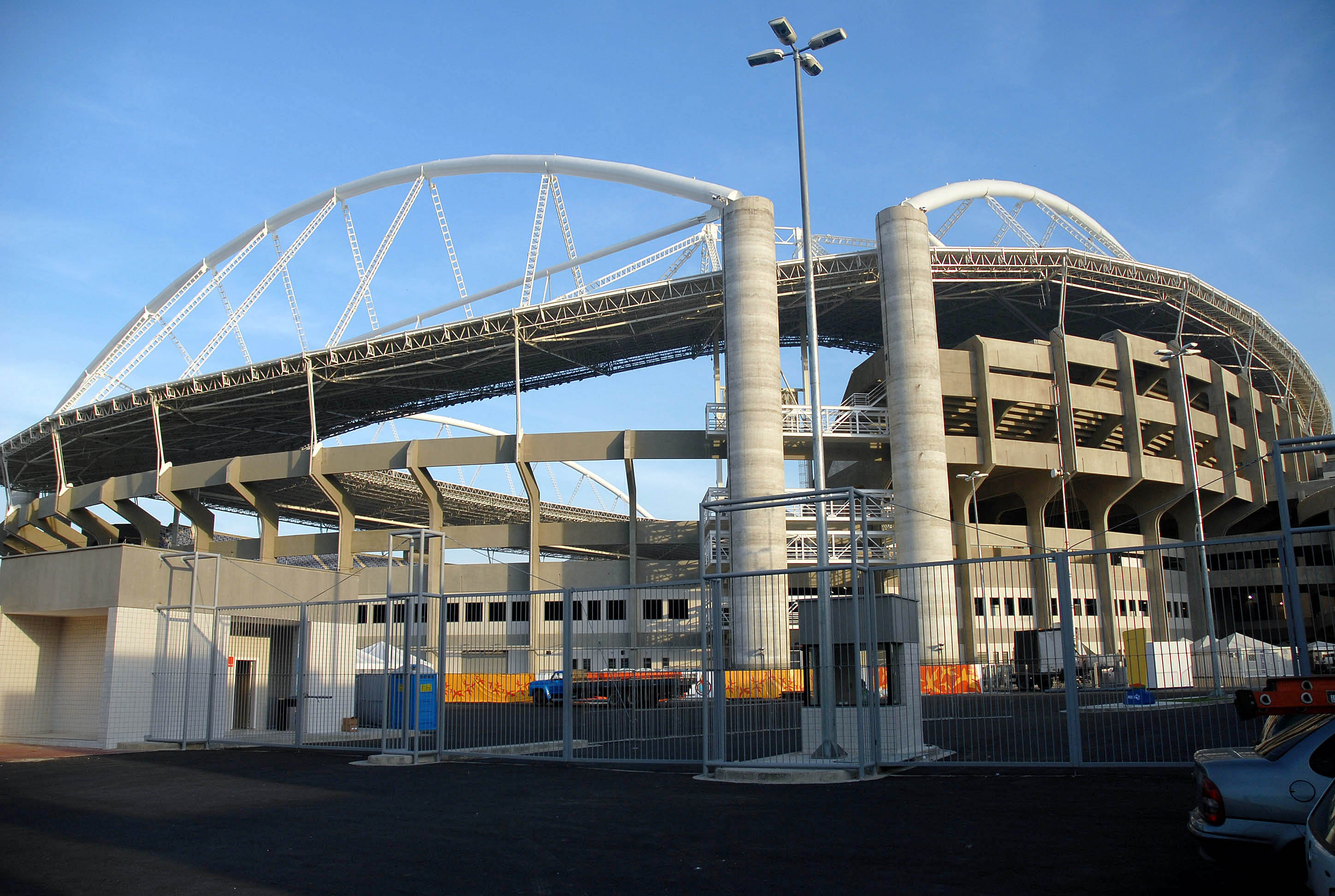
Exterior shot of the stadium looking form the north west, November 2007

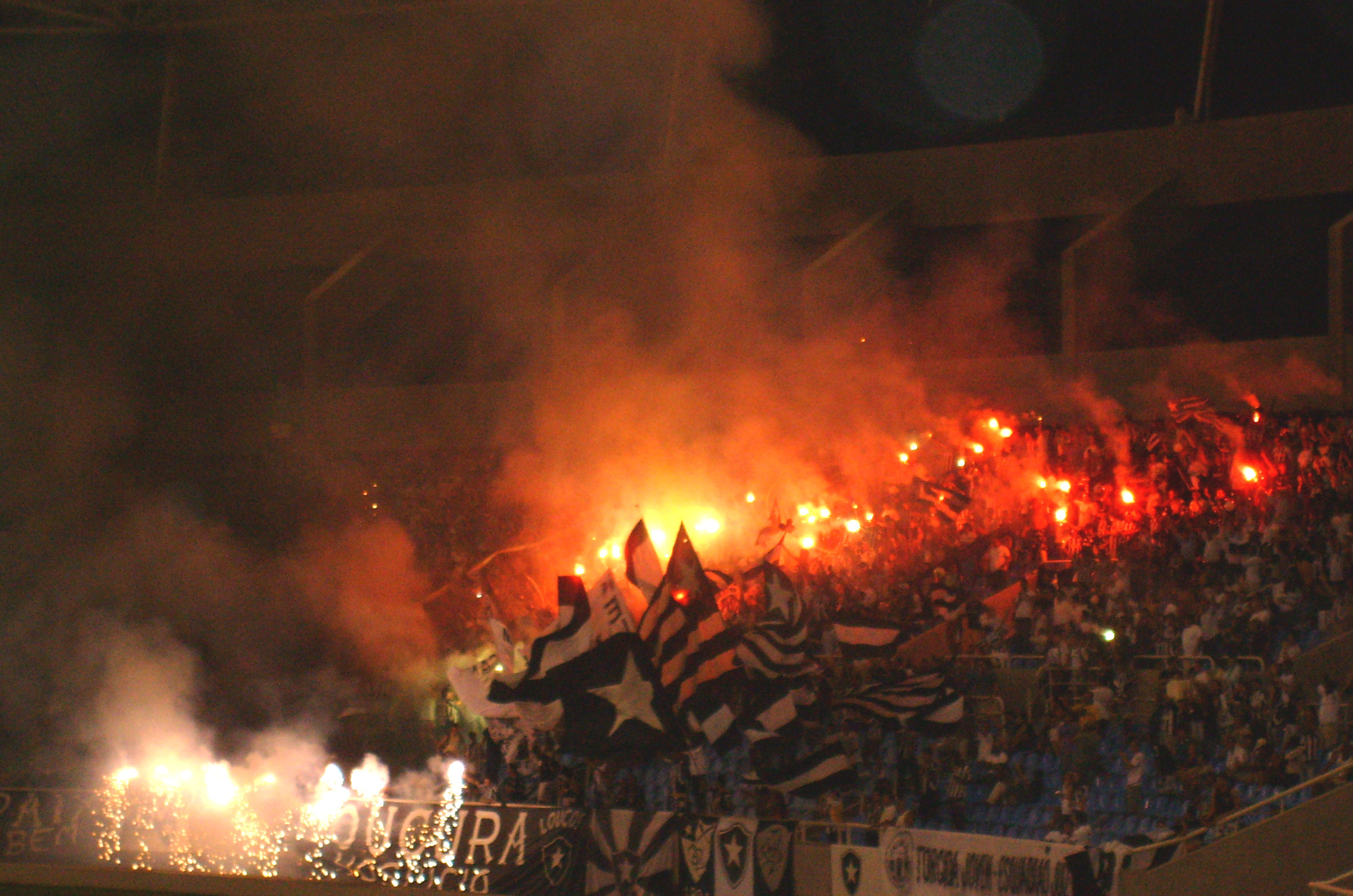
Botafogo fans setting off flares during a Série A game at the stadium, May 2008.

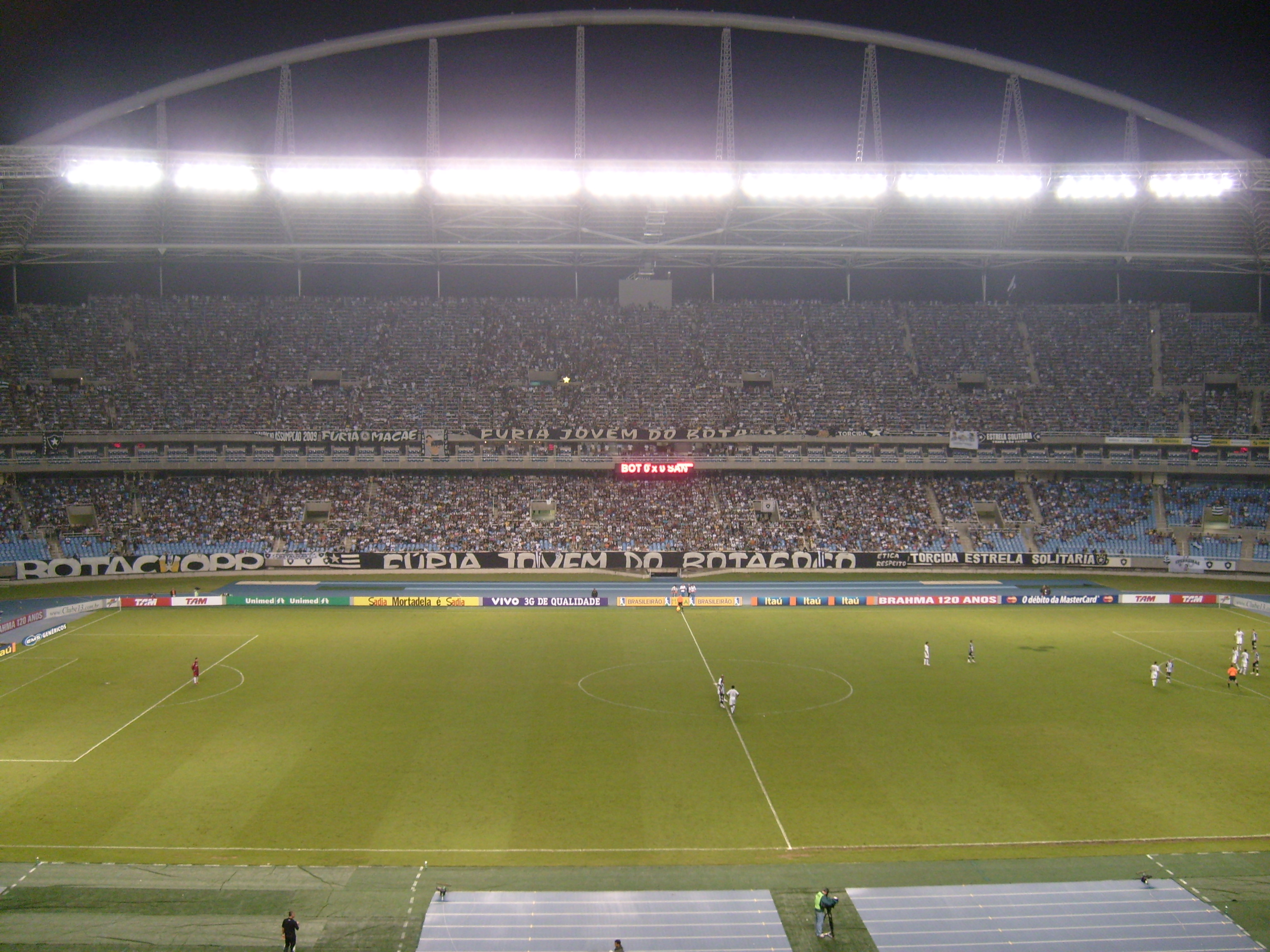
Interior view of the stadium, looking towards the eastern grandstand, October 2008

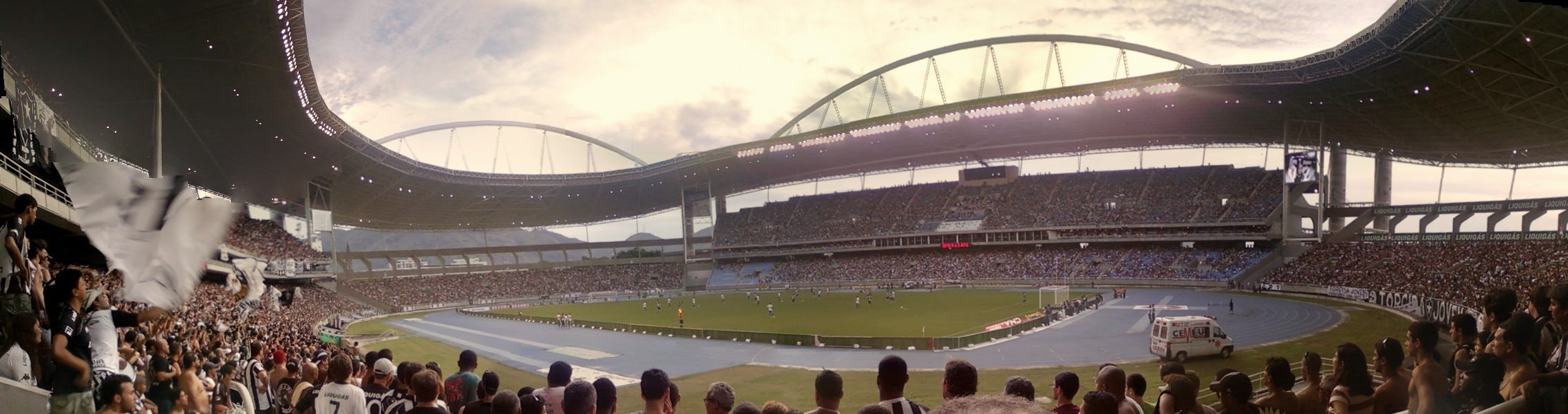
Panoramic shot of the stadium during a Série A football match, October 2009

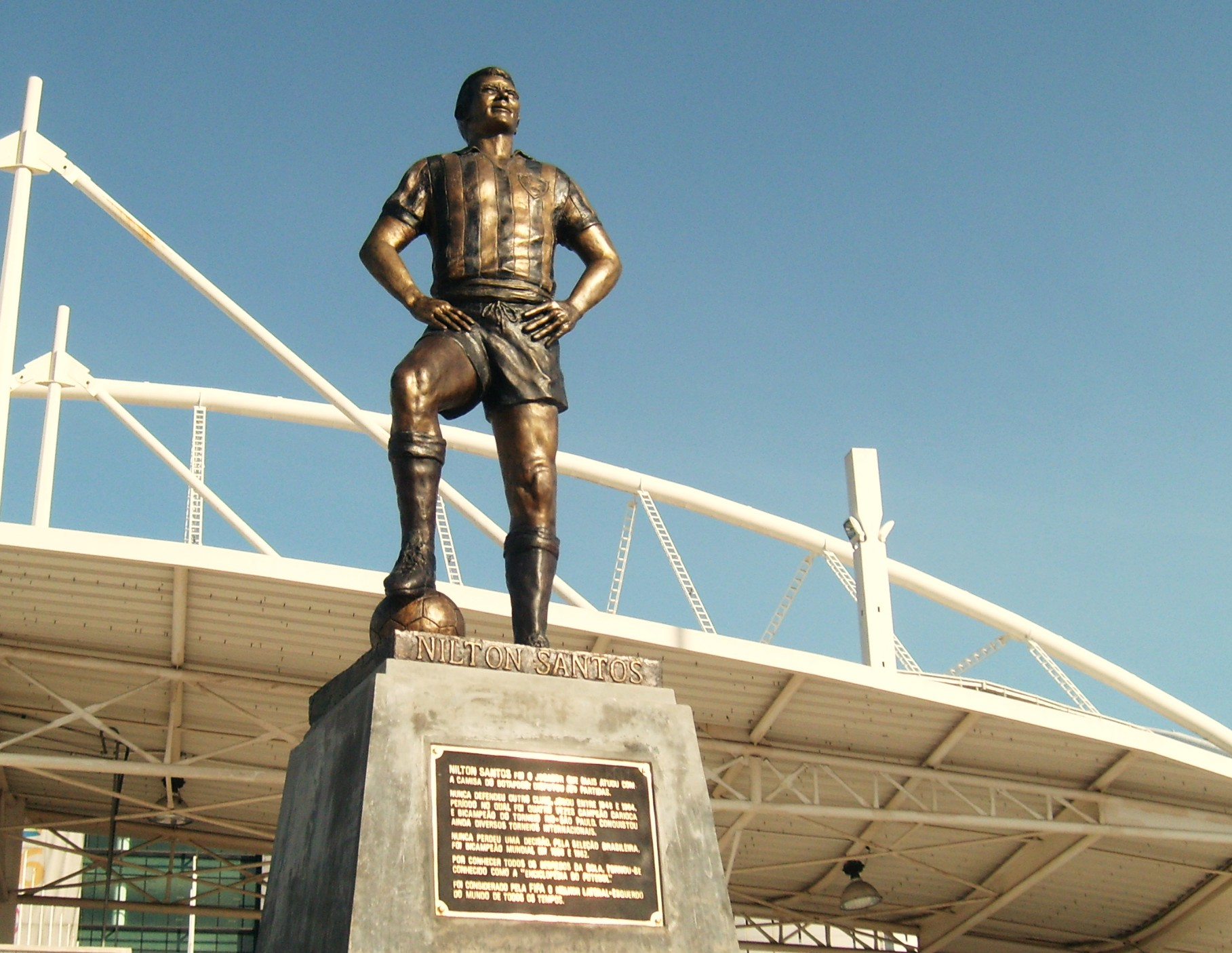
The statue of footballer Nilton Santos, situated outside the stadium, November 2009

== See also ==
- SuperVia
- Central do Brasil
- Olímpica de Engenho de Dentro station
- History of Botafogo de Futebol e Regatas
- Death of Ana Clara Benevides

Preceded by Estadio Olímpico Félix Sánchez; Santo Domingo	Athletics at the Pan American Games; Main venue 2007	Succeeded by Telmex Athletics Stadium; Guadalajara
Preceded by Gachibowli Athletic Stadium; Hyderabad	Military World Games; Opening and closing ceremonies venue 2011	Succeeded by KAFAC Sports Complex; Mungyeong
Preceded by Olympic Stadium; London	Summer Olympics; Athletics competitions Main venue 2016	Succeeded by National Stadium; Tokyo
Preceded by Olympic Stadium; London	Summer Paralympics; Athletics competitions Main venue 2016	Succeeded by National Stadium; Tokyo
