= Zhao Lina =

Chinese footballer

Personal information
- Full name: Zhao Lina
- Date of birth: September 18, 1991 (age 35)
- Place of birth: Shanghai, China
- Height: 1.82 m (6 ft 0 in)
- Position: Goalkeeper

Senior career*
| Years | Team | Apps | (Gls) |
| 2005–2023 | Shanghai RCB | | |

International career^{‡}
| 2015–2023 | China | 38 | (2) |
Medal record
Women's football
Representing China
Asian Games
| Silver medal – second place | 2018 Palembang | Team |
- * Club domestic league appearances and goals as of 5 June 2023 ‡ National team caps and goals as of 5 June 2016

Zhao Lina (simplified Chinese: 赵丽娜; traditional Chinese: 趙麗娜; pinyin: Zhào Lìnà; born September 18, 1991) is a Chinese former professional footballer who played as a goalkeeper.

== Club career ==
Zhao played club football for Shanghai Rural Commercial Bank from at least 2005, and was playing for the team at the time of her retirement in April 2023. As of 16 May 2018, she earned 10,000 yuan (US$1,500) per month as the team's highest-paid player.

== International career ==
In April 2015, Zhao Lina was called up to play for team China in the 2015 FIFA Women's World Cup. She also played for China in the 2022 AFC Women's Asian Cup, which China won, qualifying the team for the 2023 FIFA Women's World Cup.

On 14 April 2023, Zhao announced her retirement on her Weibo account.

== Personal life ==
Zhao is a drummer and was inspired to play drums by the Japanese anime Nana. Her club team arranged a practice space where she played drums after training sessions. Her favorite footballer is Manchester United goalkeeper David de Gea.

== Honours ==
China

- Asian Games silver medalist: 2018
- AFC Women's Asian Cup: 2022
