= Liu Shanshan =

Chinese footballer (born 1992)

Liu Shanshan 刘杉杉
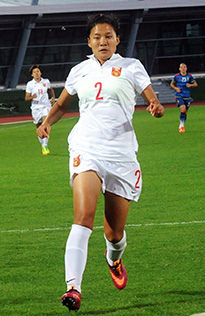
- Liu at the 2015 Algarve Cup

Personal information
- Full name: Liu Shanshan
- Date of birth: 16 March 1992 (age 34)
- Place of birth: Baoding, Hebei, China
- Height: 1.68 m (5 ft 6 in)
- Position: Defender

Senior career*
| Years | Team | Apps | (Gls) |
| 2016 | Changchun Public Excellence | | |
| 2017 | Hebei | | |
| 2018-2020 | Beijing | 1 | (0) |
| 2021-2023 | Wuhan Jianghan University | 30 | (1) |

International career^{‡}
| 2012 | China U20 | 3 | (0) |
| 2012–2019 | China | 115 | (1) |
- * Club domestic league appearances and goals ‡ National team caps and goals as of 10 November 2019

Liu Shanshan (simplified Chinese: 刘杉杉; traditional Chinese: 劉杉杉; pinyin: Liú Shānshān; born 16 March 1992) is a former Chinese footballer who played as a defender.

== Career ==
Liu began football training when she was 5, following her father who had also been a footballer. She attended Hebei Normal University and played for China at the 2012 FIFA U-20 Women's World Cup.

On 8 December 2012, Liu made her debut for the China women's national football team, in a 4–0 defeat by the United States at Ford Field, Detroit.

At the 2015 FIFA Women's World Cup, 23-year-old Liu entered the tournament with 33 caps and was one of the more experienced members of the Chinese squad.

== See also ==
- List of women's footballers with 100 or more caps
