= Jessie Fleming =

Canadian soccer player (born 1998)

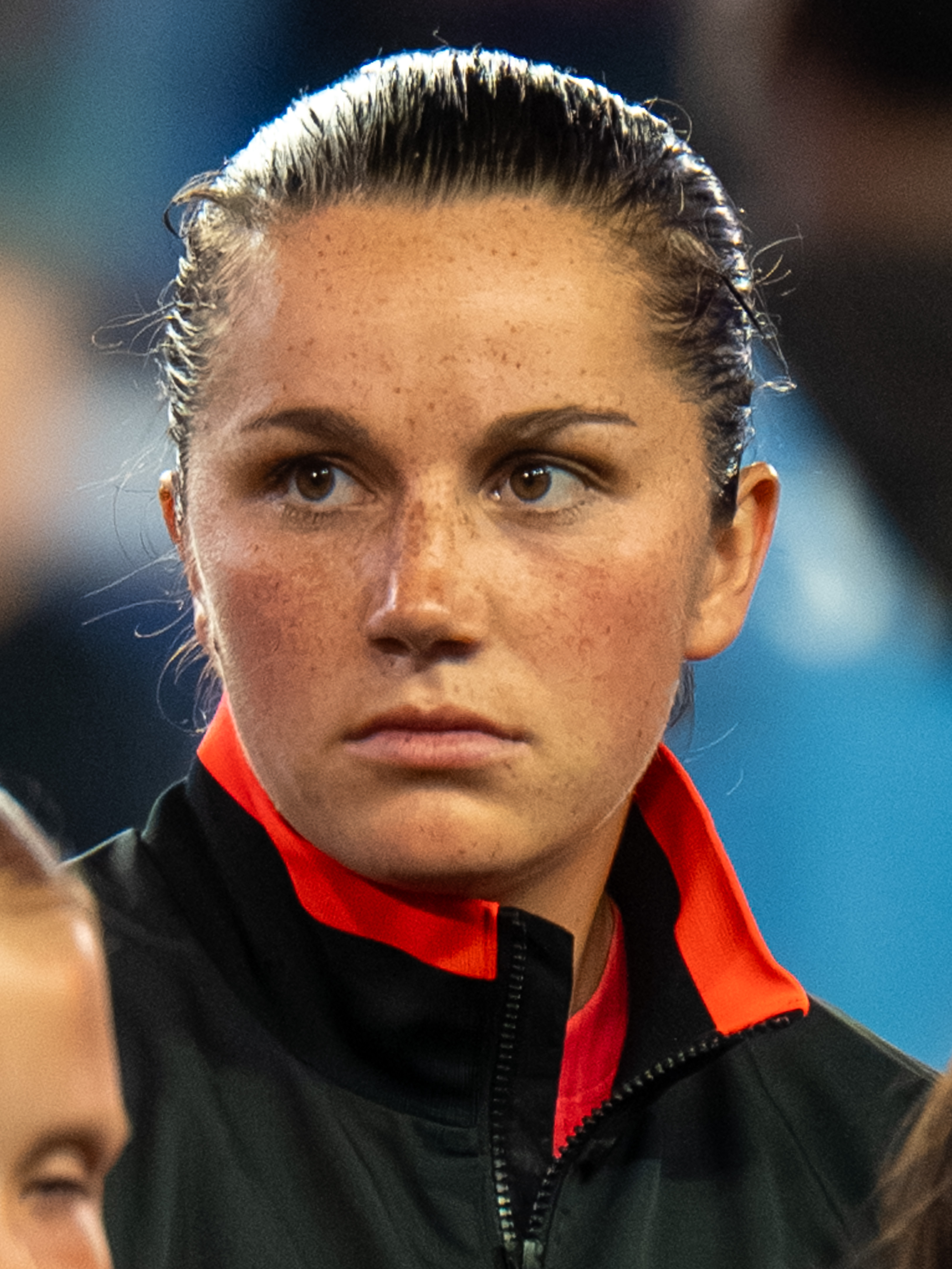
- Fleming with the Portland Thorns in 2025

Personal information
- Full name: Jessie Alexandra Fleming
- Date of birth: March 11, 1998 (age 28)
- Place of birth: London, Ontario, Canada
- Height: 1.64 m (5 ft 5 in)
- Position: Midfielder

Team information
- Current team: Portland Thorns
- Number: 21

Youth career
- Nor'West Optimist SC

College career
Years	Team	Apps	(Gls)
2016–2019	UCLA Bruins	75	(25)

Senior career*
Years	Team	Apps	(Gls)
2020–2024	Chelsea	65	(10)
2024–	Portland Thorns	80	(3)

International career^{‡}
2013–2014	Canada U-17	9	(4)
2014	Canada U-20	3	(0)
2015	Canada U-23	5	(1)
2013–	Canada	159	(20)
Medal record
Women's football
Representing Canada
Olympic Games
Gold medal – first place	2020 Tokyo	Team
Bronze medal – third place	2016 Rio de Janeiro	Team
CONCACAF W Championship
Silver medal – second place	2018 United States
- * Club domestic league appearances and goals as of November 11, 2026 ‡ National team caps and goals as of October 12, 2026

Jessie Alexandra Fleming (born March 11, 1998) is a Canadian professional soccer player who plays as a midfielder for National Women's Soccer League club Portland Thorns and captains the Canadian national team.

Fleming played college soccer in the United States for the UCLA Bruins from 2016 to 2019, before turning professional and spending four years with English club Chelsea. She was a member of Canada's gold medal-winning side at the 2020 Summer Olympics, where she scored the team's only regular-time goal in the final on a penalty kick, as well as the first goal in the penalty shoot-out.

== Early life ==
Fleming was born in London, Ontario to Michaele and John Fleming, who are both originally from Toronto. She has an older brother, Tristan, and a younger sister, Elysse. As a child, she competed in soccer, hockey (including in a full-contact boys' league), track and field, and cross-country. She started playing soccer at the age of three for the London-based Nor'West Optimist Soccer Club, where she remained until 2016 and was coached by her father, John.

In a later profile in DARBY, Fleming described a "really wonderful childhood" in which her parents, both former competitive cross-country runners, prioritized effort over results; her mother, a provincial high-school champion who went on to practice family medicine, still sends her game-day texts urging her to "play with heart." Fleming has said both parents also stressed being a good teammate and learning from mistakes, values she credits as central to her development as a leader. As a 10-year-old, she kept a laminated poster of footballers Marta and Pelé—a Christmas gift from her brother Tristan—hanging in her bedroom.

Growing up, Fleming and her father regularly watched FC Barcelona together, closely following the midfield play of Andrés Iniesta, Sergio Busquets and Xavi during the club's Pep Guardiola era, and she has credited their intelligent, selfless passing style with shaping her understanding of the game. At age 13, her youth club travelled to Spain for a series of exhibition games, during which she watched a Barcelona men's team training session at the Camp Nou and recalled watching Lionel Messi and Dani Alves juggle the ball during their warmup; she has said the trip left her with a lasting resolve to turn professional and to play with the same unselfish approach to possession.

Fleming attended elementary school at Ryerson Public School, where she remained undefeated in cross-country throughout her entire elementary school career. She went on to attend London Central Secondary School from Grade 9 to Grade 10, where she competed in OFSAA track and field and cross-country. In 2012, she won the novice girls' 4000m race at the OFSAA Cross Country Championships. The following year, she competed at the OFSAA Track and Field Championships and won both the midget women's 1500m and midget women's 3000m competitions. She still holds the record for the 1500m in the midget women's category. In 2014, she competed again at the OFSAA Track and Field Championships, winning a gold medal in the junior women's 3000m race and a silver medal in the junior women's 1500m race. She switched to H. B. Beal Secondary School for Grades 11 and 12, and graduated in 2016.

== College career ==
Fleming verbally committed to UCLA in December 2014 and joined the Bruins in August 2016. Fleming has said she originally wanted to attend a school close enough to London that she could drive there, and only settled on UCLA—3,000 kilometres from home—after weighing the program's ambitions and academic reputation against her initial hesitance about the distance. She played her first game on August 28, less than ten days after helping Canada win a bronze medal at the Olympic Games, scoring twice in a 4–3 loss to Florida. Her goalscoring tear continued as she netted 7 goals in her first 6 games as a college player. She appeared in 19 games, making 16 starts, and finished as the leading scorer on the team with 11 goals and 5 assists, for a total of 27 points. Fleming was one of just two freshmen to receive All-America honours in 2016, being selected to the NSCAA All-America third team. She was selected the Top Drawer Soccer Freshman of the Year, and also earned first-team NSCAA All-Pacific Region, All-Pac-12 and All-Freshman acclaim.

As a sophomore, Fleming scored 6 goals, including three game-winners, and recorded 8 assists, for a total of 20 points. She earned first-team All-America honours and received first-team All-West Region and All-Pac-12 honours for the second-straight year. After helping UCLA reach the College Cup final and scoring a goal in the championship match, she was selected as a finalist for the Hermann Trophy and chosen as one of four nominees for the Class of 2018 Honda Sports Award for soccer.

Although she missed nearly half of her junior season while on national team duty, Fleming still earned first-team All-Pac-12 honours for the third year in a row and was a second-team All-West Region honouree after scoring 15 points on 5 goals and 5 assists.

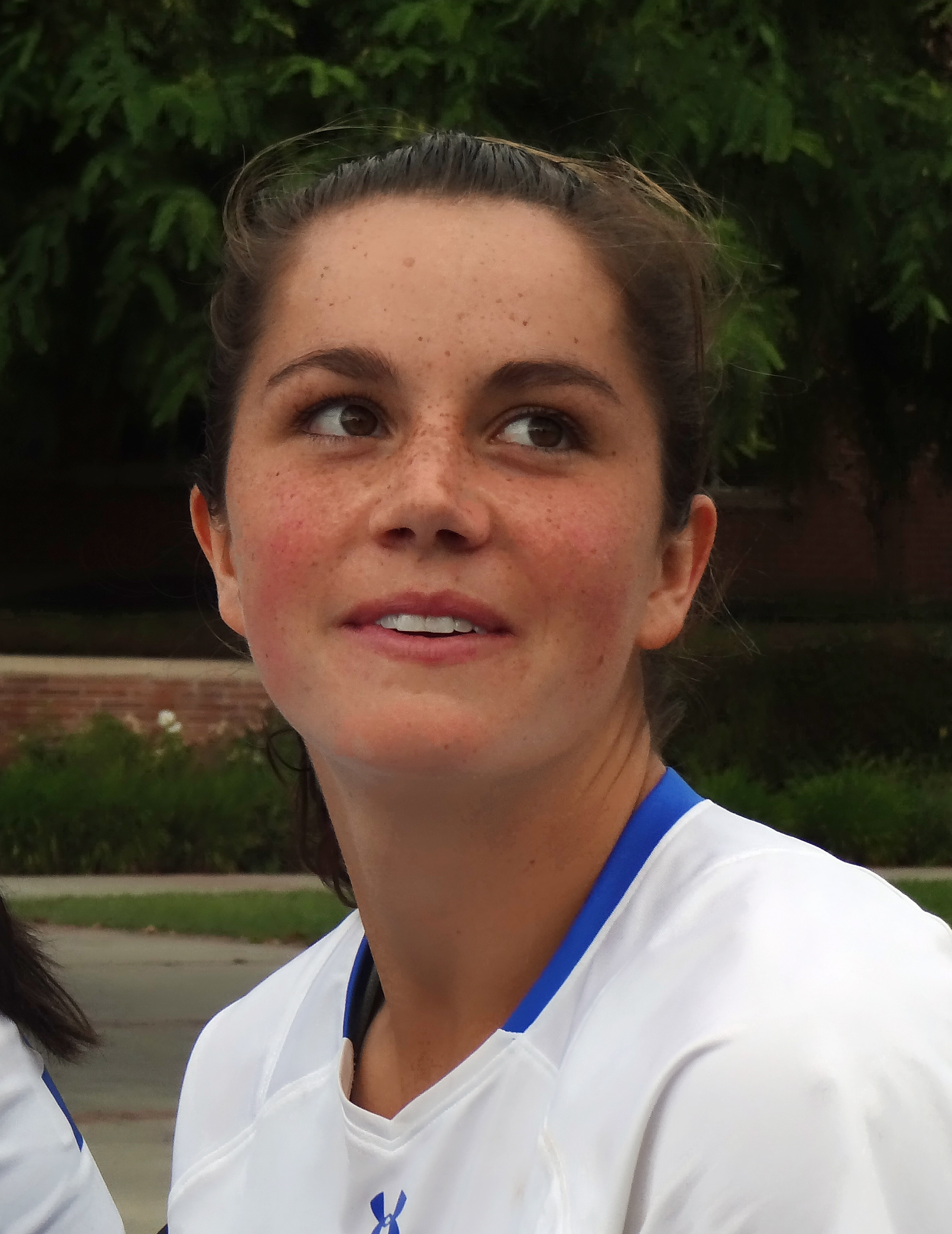
Fleming at UCLA in 2019

As a senior, Fleming played in a defensive midfield role, finishing the season with 3 goals and 4 assists in 22 appearances, for a total of 10 points. She was chosen as one of three finalists for the Hermann Trophy and one of four finalists for the Honda Sports Award. She was also one of ten finalists for the Senior CLASS Award.

She graduated from UCLA in 2021, with a major in materials engineering and a minor in environmental science. Fleming has since said that balancing the demands of varsity soccer with the rigour of an engineering degree was "extremely difficult," describing an ongoing struggle to give either pursuit her full effort at once, but that she remains grateful to have completed the degree and hopes to explore that side of herself further after retiring from playing.

== Club career ==
=== Chelsea ===
On July 22, 2020, Fleming signed for FA WSL champions Chelsea on a three-year deal, her first professional contract. Fleming has said she was drawn by her fascination with European football culture, though she "didn't feel overwhelmingly like, 'Oh, I'm ready for this'" at the time, and has described her recurring self-doubt as both a weakness and a strength that has driven her to prepare more thoroughly than some of her peers. On August 29, she made her debut for the Blues as a substitute against Manchester City in the 2020 FA Community Shield at Wembley. On December 9, she made her UEFA Champions League debut in a 5–0 away win over Benfica. She made her first start against the same opposition a week later, and helped her team to a 3–0 victory at Kingsmeadow. On January 27, 2021, she made her first league start in a 4–0 away win over Aston Villa at Banks's Stadium. On March 14, she played the full 90 minutes as the Blues won the 2021 FA League Cup Final against Bristol City at Vicarage Road. In her first season at Chelsea, she made a total of 26 appearances across all competitions and won the 2020–21 FA WSL title. She was an unused substitute in the 2021 Champions League Final, where Chelsea were defeated by Barcelona. Fleming would later cite the transition to the professional scene as a challenge, in particular the need to raise her game in order to vie for playing time.

Beginning the 2021–22 FA WSL, Fleming scored her first goal for Chelsea in a 6–1 victory against Manchester United at Leigh Sports Village on September 26, 2021. Three days later, she got her first assist for the club in the 2020–21 FA Cup quarter-final against Birmingham City, setting up Fran Kirby in the 72nd minute. On October 10, she registered her first league assist in a 2–0 win against Leicester City. On October 31, she assisted Beth England in a 3–0 victory against Manchester City at the Academy Stadium, helping Chelsea reach the 2021 FA Cup Final. On November 9, she scored her first Champions League goal in a 7–0 win away to Servette. The 2021–22 WSL season saw Fleming's usage by the club increase significantly, featuring in 21 of 22 games, 11 of those as starts, and tallying six goals and four assists. She won the league title with Chelsea for the second time, before playing in her second consecutive run with the club to the 2022 FA Cup Final.

Shortly after the commencement of the 2022–23 Women's Super League, Fleming signed a contract extension with Chelsea through the summer of 2025. Chelsea won its third consecutive FA Cup on May 27, 2023, and four days later secured its fourth consecutive Women's Super League title. Fleming played 20 games in the season, with a new career high of 14 starts. However, her playing time began to decline as the season went on, a trend that continued into the following season.

Fleming spent more than three years living in London during her Chelsea tenure, a period she has described as having "lended itself well" to travel and to a growing personal interest in photography.

=== Portland Thorns ===
On January 23, 2024, The Daily Telegraph reported that Fleming would be moving to the American National Women's Soccer League team Portland Thorns FC. The stated transfer fee of £250,000 would make it the most expensive acquisition ever by an NWSL club. On January 31, 2024, after four years with Chelsea, the Thorns announced the signing of Fleming for an undisclosed fee, with general manager Karina LeBlanc highlighting her "championship mindset" and then-head coach Mike Norris saying of the transfer "Adding a player of Jessie's caliber is a big step for us as we continue to build the roster for 2024 and beyond". The move brought Fleming closer to her family; her younger sister, Elysse, attends the University of British Columbia in Vancouver and competes in cross country, and Fleming has said she has been able to attend far more of Elysse's races since relocating to the Pacific Northwest.

Fleming scored her first goal for Portland on April 27, 2025, converting a penalty in a 3–3 draw against Racing Louisville in a match which broke the record for most fouls (41) in an NWSL game, with Fleming calling it "probably one of, if not the most frustrating match I've ever been a part of as a player" and saying the league should be "embarrassed" by the officiating.

== International career ==
=== Youth ===
Fleming started playing for the Canadian youth national teams in 2012, at the age of 14. The following year, she captained Canada at the 2013 CONCACAF U-17 Championship in Jamaica, leading the team to a silver medal. During the tournament, she scored three goals (two in the group stage and one in the semi-final against Jamaica) and was named Player of the Match in two of Canada's five matches. As a result, she was named to the Best XI and awarded the Golden Ball as the tournament's Most Valuable Player (MVP), a moment she has said "instilled a bit of the belief that my coaches and teammates had in me."

In December 2013, she was chosen as one of six nominees for the Canadian U-17 Players of the Year award.

At the 2014 U-17 World Cup in Costa Rica, Fleming navigated Canada out of the group of death (which included Germany, North Korea, and Ghana). She played in all four of Canada's games, scoring one goal in the 2–2 draw with Germany. She also recorded an assist in the quarter-final loss to Venezuela.

Fleming was a member of the team that reached the quarter-finals of the 2014 U-20 World Cup in Canada. At 16, she was the second-youngest player on the Canadian roster. She made two appearances (against Ghana and Finland) in the group stage of the tournament, before playing all 90 minutes in the quarter-final against Germany. In December 2014, she was named Canadian U-17 Player of the Year.

Fleming also represented Canada at the 2015 Pan American Games, where the Canadian Soccer Association fielded an Olympic Developmental under-23 squad. She played every minute of the tournament, scoring an 88th-minute penalty in the bronze medal match against Mexico, which Canada lost 2–1. In December 2015, she was named Canadian U-20 Player of the Year.

=== Senior ===
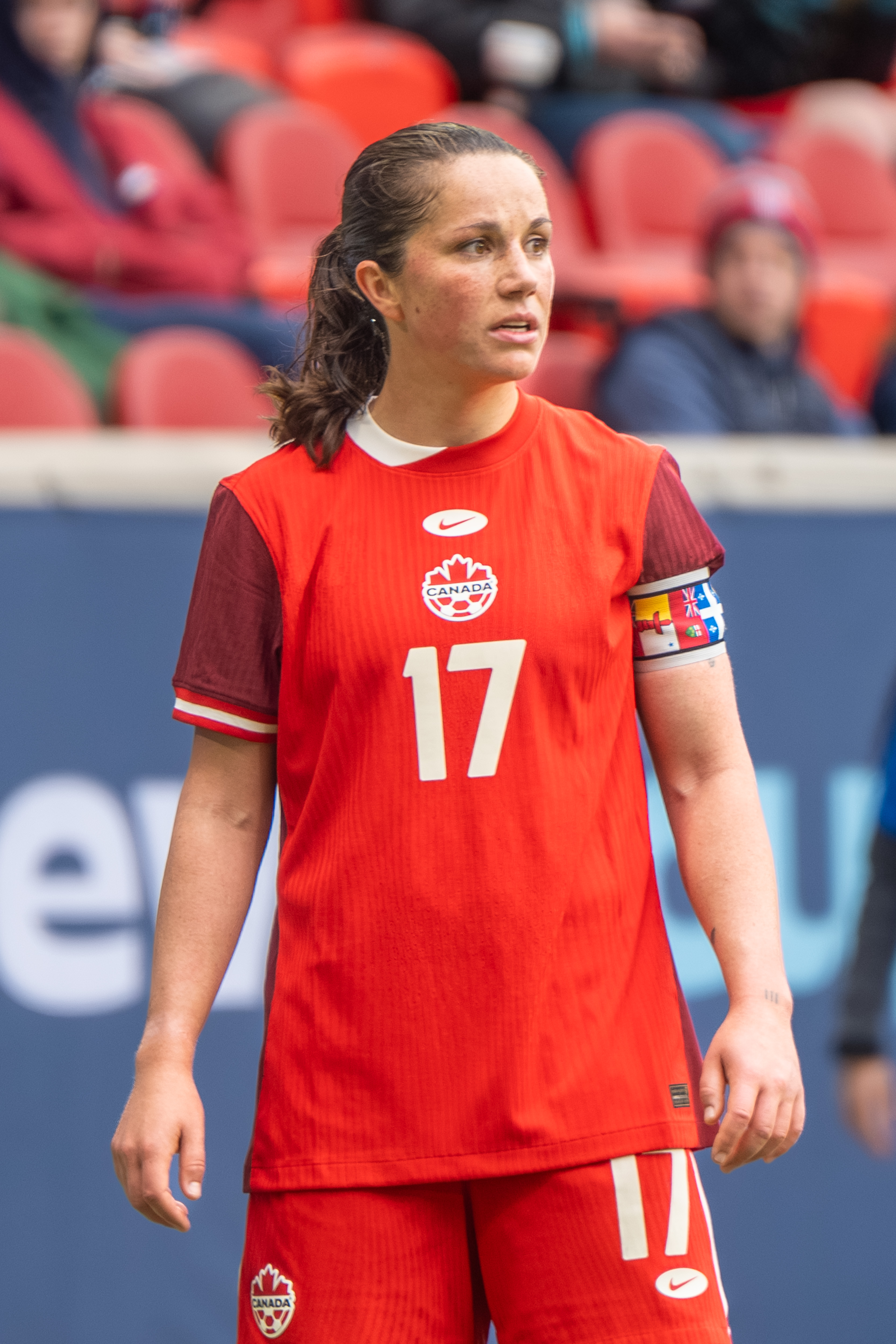
Fleming with Canada in 2026

==== Senior debut and rise to prominence (2013–19) ====
In December 2013, following her performances at the CONCACAF U-17 Championship, Fleming received her first call-up to the senior national team, ahead of the 2013 Torneio Internacional de Brasília. On December 15, she made her senior international debut at the age of 15 years and 278 days, when she replaced Brittany Baxter in the 72nd minute of a 1–0 defeat to Chile at the Estádio Nacional Mané Garrincha. Fifteen minutes into her debut, she received her first yellow card. At the time, she was the second-youngest player to ever play for the national team; as of 2021, she is the third-youngest, after Olivia Smith and Kara Lang. A week later, she made her first start in a 1–0 win over Scotland, and was replaced at half-time by Kaylyn Kyle.

In 2014, Fleming made six more appearances – three as a starter and three as a substitute – for the senior national team, all in friendly matches.

In early 2015, Fleming moved to Vancouver to train full-time with the national team ahead of the 2015 FIFA World Cup. In January, she started all three matches at the 2015 Four Nations Tournament in China, which Canada won. On March 4, 2015, Fleming scored her first senior international goal in a 2–0 win over Scotland at the 2015 Cyprus Cup.

On April 27, 2015, Fleming was named to the roster for the 2015 World Cup, held on home soil in Canada. At the age of 17, she was the youngest player on the Canadian team, joining a locker room that included veterans Christine Sinclair, Diana Matheson, and Desiree Scott—an experience Fleming has said showed her "the standard of what it was like to play on the women's team" and introduced her to teammates who "really championed younger players" rather than enforcing an unnecessary hierarchy. On May 14, she scored the only goal in a behind-closed-doors friendly against Mexico, which Canada won 1–0. On June 15, she started Canada's final group stage match of the World Cup against Netherlands in front of 45,420 fans at Olympic Stadium. The match ended 1–1, which was enough for Canada to win Group A. Canada defeated Switzerland, its first World Cup knockout stage win since 2003, but fell to England in the quarter-final.

At the CONCACAF Olympic Qualifiers, Fleming made three appearances in the group stage and scored her second international goal against Trinidad and Tobago on February 14, helping Canada win Group A. However, she did not feature in the semi-final win over Costa Rica or in the final loss to the United States. On July 20, she scored her third international goal in a friendly win over China at the Stade Sébastien Charléty. She was named to Canada's 2016 Summer Olympics squad, which defeated the home team Brazil to win a bronze medal. She had a secondary assist on the winning goal, scored by Christine Sinclair.

Fleming made her 50th senior appearance on March 7, 2018, scoring her fifth international goal in a 3–0 win over South Korea at the 2018 Algarve Cup. She was by this point established as one of the most promising younger players on a team, at a time when commentators were increasingly contemplating its future upon the eventual retirement of longtime captain Sinclair.

On May 25, 2019, Fleming was named to the roster for the 2019 FIFA World Cup, where she would eventually play every minute of the tournament for Canada. On June 15, she scored her first World Cup goal in the 2–0 group stage victory over New Zealand and was chosen Player of the Match. Canada was ultimately eliminated in the Round of 16 by Sweden, which renewed doubts about the program's future. Fleming would reflect, years later, that it was "really disappointing. I think it's fair to say we feel like we underperformed that tournament."

==== 2020 Olympic triumph ====
Fleming was named part of the Canadian team for the 2020 Summer Olympics in Tokyo, participating in her second Olympic tournament. The Tokyo Olympics marked a major boost in Fleming's profile when, following a quarter-final shootout win over Brazil that saw captain Sinclair miss her penalty attempt, the latter advised coach Bev Priestman that Fleming should take over as the team's designated penalty-taker in the tournament. In the August 2, 2021, semi-final match with the United States, Fleming scored the only goal via a penalty kick, resulting in a 1–0 win that sent Canada to its first ever Olympic final. Sinclair handing Fleming the ball in advance of the kick was misinterpreted by many as a spontaneous decision, rather than one agreed in advance, and was widely covered as a "passing of the torch" scenario. Fleming repeated her performance during the gold medal match, scoring on a penalty kick against Sweden to tie the game 1–1. She later scored the first goal in the shoot-out at the end of the game, which resulted in Canada winning the gold medal.

Achievements in 2021–22

In 2021, Fleming was named Player of the Month three times by the Canadian Soccer Association, in the months of March, October, and November. She was also voted as Canadian Player of the Year and nominated for the CONCACAF Women's Player of the Year award.

At the 2022 Arnold Clark Cup, Fleming started the first match against England as captain, in the absence of regular captain Christine Sinclair. On June 26, she earned her 100th cap while serving as captain again for a 0–0 draw against South Korea in a friendly match at BMO Field. Later in the year, she was one of four players to score three goals at the 2022 CONCACAF W Championship, but lost the Golden Boot to teammate Julia Grosso on a tiebreaker, Grosso having had an assist and played fewer minutes. She was named Canada Soccer's Player of the Year for the second time, becoming the third woman to win the award consecutively.

2023 World Cup

The leadup to the 2023 FIFA World Cup was marked by conflicts between the women's national team and the Canadian Soccer Association over the team's financing, as well as questions around Canada's offensive capabilities. The draw placed them in what Fleming called a "challenging" group that included host nation Australia. Fleming was widely expected to be a central role on the team in the tournament, with many commentators identifying her as Canada's most important player. Former national team member Amy Walsh assessed that "it's very much Jessie Fleming's team. How Fleming goes, I think Canada goes." However, as a result of a practice injury, Fleming was unable to play in the opening match against Nigeria, which ended in a 0–0 draw, with her absence being widely noted as a major weakness. She returned to play the full 90 minutes in Canada's 2–1 victory over Ireland, wearing the captain's armband in the first half prior to Sinclair's substituting on. Canada entered its final group match needing only a draw with Australia to advance, but were defeated 4–0 in what was widely described as one of the team's worst defeats in major competition. Fleming described it as "a bad night to have a bad night," with post-match assessments of roster performance largely concluding that she had not been able to influence the outcome to her own standard.

Following the disappointment in Australia, the team regrouped for their next fixtures, the CONCACAF Olympic qualification playoff in September, facing Jamaica for the second CONCACAF berth at the 2024 Summer Olympics in Paris. Despite initial concerns, Canada won both games. Fleming started both games and wore the captain's armband; when Sinclair was substituted on for the second game, Fleming "tried to give her the captain's armband. Sinclair immediately waved her off." At year's end, she was named Canada Soccer's Player of the Year for the third consecutive time.

==== Captaincy (2024–present) ====
In advance of the 2024 CONCACAF W Gold Cup, Fleming was named the captain of the Canada national team, succeeding Sinclair. Fleming has since described the role as "still a role that I'm growing into," reflecting that her career has taught her "there really is no endpoint" to self-improvement, and that she has learned to embrace the unfinished nature of leadership even as she continues to grapple with self-doubt. Canada reached the semi-final of the tournament, ultimately falling to the United States in a penalty shootout. Fleming was named to the tournament's Best XI.

Fleming was called up to the Canada squad for the 2024 Summer Olympics. As captain, she led the team through the fallout of a staff-operated drone surveillance scandal involving New Zealand's training sessions in Saint-Étienne, which resulted in a six-point FIFA deduction and suspensions for members of Canada's coaching staff, including then-head coach Bev Priestman; Fleming has described the episode as "a very overwhelming, hectic situation" that arrived "like a tidal wave," saying the playing group leaned on the belief that "this is our bubble" and that the scandal "didn't represent us." She played in the first half of Canada's quarterfinal loss on penalties to Germany. Fleming has said the difficulty of the tournament ultimately became "an extremely powerful unifying force" for the squad, bringing the team closer together than she had previously imagined.

== Personal life ==
Fleming took up film photography while living in London, using a Pentax K1000 camera to document her life abroad, including visits to Borough Market, cafes, and bookstores; she has said the hobby, inspired in part by her grandfather's own interest in photography, appeals to her because film requires "slowing down" rather than seeing results immediately. She has described herself as "a self-doubting person" by nature, but has said that quality has driven her to be more thoroughly prepared than some peers and continues to fuel her curiosity to keep improving as a player and leader.

== Career statistics ==
=== Club ===
As of match played August 3, 2026.

Club	Season	League			National Cup (Note: Includes appearance(s) in the Women's FA Cup.)		League Cup (Note: Includes appearance(s) in the FA Women's League Cup.)		Continental (Note: Includes appearance(s) in the UEFA Women's Champions League.)		Other (Note: Includes appearance(s) in the Women's FA Community Shield.)		Total	
Club	Season	Division	Apps	Goals	Apps	Goals	Apps	Goals	Apps	Goals	Apps	Goals	Apps	Goals
Chelsea	2020–21	WSL	14	0	5 (Note: Includes appearance(s) in the final stages of the 2020–21 Women's FA Cup, which took place during the 2021–22 season.)	0	5	0	4	0	1	0	29	0
Chelsea	2021–22	WSL	21	6	5	0	2	1	5	1	0	0	33	8
Chelsea	2022–23	WSL	20	3	5	0	2	0	9	0	0	0	36	3
Chelsea	2023–24	WSL	10	1	0	0	0	0	3	0	0	0	13	1
Chelsea	Total		65	10	15	0	9	1	21	1	1	0	111	12
Portland Thorns	2024	NWSL	25	0	0	0	0	0	4	0	1	0	30	0
Portland Thorns	2025	NWSL	25	2	0	0	0	0	0	0	2	0	27	2
Portland Thorns	2026	NWSL	18	1	0	0	0	0	0	0	0	0	18	1
Portland Thorns	Total		68	3	0	0	0	0	4	0	3	0	75	3
Career total			133	13	15	0	9	1	25	1	4	0	186	15

=== International ===
As of match played October 12, 2026

Appearances and goals by national team and year
National team	Year	Apps	Goals
Canada	2013	2	0
Canada	2014	6	0
Canada	2015	13	1
Canada	2016	15	2
Canada	2017	11	1
Canada	2018	10	3
Canada	2019	13	2
Canada	2020	7	1
Canada	2021	17	4
Canada	2022	17	5
Canada	2023	12	0
Canada	2024	16	1
Canada	2025	12	0
Canada	2026	8	0
Total		159	20

Scores and results list Canada's goal tally first, score column indicates score after each Fleming goal.

List of international goals scored by Jessie Fleming
No.	Date	Venue	Opponent	Score	Result	Competition	Ref.
1	March 4, 2015	GSP Stadium, Strovolos, Cyprus	Scotland	1–0	2–0	2015 Cyprus Cup	
2	February 14, 2016	BBVA Compass Stadium, Houston, United States	Trinidad and Tobago	6–0	6–0	2016 CONCACAF Women's Olympic Qualifying Championship	
3	July 20, 2016	Stade Sébastien Charléty, Paris, France	China	1–0	1–0	Friendly	
4	June 8, 2017	Investors Group Field, Winnipeg, Canada	Costa Rica	1–0	3–1	Friendly	
5	March 5, 2018	Estádio Municipal de Albufeira, Albufeira, Portugal	South Korea	2–0	3–0	2018 Algarve Cup	
6	June 10, 2018	Tim Hortons Field, Hamilton, Canada	Germany	2–1	2–3	Friendly	
7	October 14, 2018	Toyota Stadium, Dallas, United States	Panama	3–0	7–0	2018 CONCACAF Women's Championship	
8	March 25, 2019	BMO Field, Toronto, Canada	Mexico	1–0	3–0	Friendly	
9	June 15, 2019	Stade des Alpes, Grenoble, France	New Zealand	1–0	2–0	2019 FIFA Women's World Cup	
10	January 29, 2020	H-E-B Park, Edinburg, United States	Saint Kitts and Nevis	8–0	11–0	2020 CONCACAF Women's Olympic Qualifying Championship	
11	April 9, 2021	Leckwith Stadium, Cardiff, Wales	Wales	3–0	3–0	Friendly	
12	August 2, 2021	Kashima Soccer Stadium, Kashima, Japan	United States	1–0	1–0	2020 Summer Olympics	
13	August 6, 2021	International Stadium Yokohama, Yokohama, Japan	Sweden	1–1	1–1(a.e.t.), (3–2 p)	2020 Summer Olympics	
14	October 23, 2021	TD Place Stadium, Ottawa, Canada	New Zealand	1–0	5–1	Friendly	
15	April 8, 2022	BC Place, Vancouver, Canada	Nigeria	1–0	2–0	Friendly	
16	July 5, 2022	Estadio BBVA, Guadalupe, Mexico	Trinidad and Tobago	4–0	6–0	2022 CONCACAF W Championship	
17	July 11, 2022	Estadio BBVA, Guadalupe, Mexico	Costa Rica	1–0	2–0	2022 CONCACAF W Championship	
18	July 14, 2022	Estadio Universitario, Monterrey, Mexico	Jamaica	1–0	3–0	2022 CONCACAF W Championship	
19	October 10, 2022	Estadio Municipal de Chapín, Jerez, Spain	Morocco	1–0	4–0	Friendly	
20	July 28, 2024	Stade Geoffroy-Guichard, Saint-Étienne, France	France	1–1	2–1	2024 Summer Olympics	

== Honours ==
Chelsea

- Women's Super League: 2020–21, 2021–22, 2022–23
- Women's FA Cup: 2020–21, 2021–22, 2022–23
- FA Women's League Cup: 2020–21
- Women's FA Community Shield: 2020

Canada

- Summer Olympic Games: Gold Medal: 2021; bronze medal: 2016
- CONCACAF W Championship runner-up: 2018, 2022
- Algarve Cup: 2016
- Four Nations Tournament: 2015

Individual

- CONCACAF Best XI: 2017
- CONCACAF W Championship Best XI: 2018, 2022
- CONCACAF W Gold Cup Best XI: 2024
- CONCACAF Women's U-17 Championship Golden Ball: 2013
- CONCACAF Women's U-17 Championship Best XI: 2013
- Canadian Player of the Year: 2021, 2022, 2023
- Canadian U-20 Player of the Year: 2015, 2016, 2017
- Canadian U-17 Player of the Year: 2014
- FA Women's Super League Player of the Month: November 2021
- First-team All-American: 2017, 2019
- Third-team All-American: 2016
- NWSL Player of the Week: Week 12 and Week 26, 2025

== See also ==
- List of women's footballers with 100 or more international caps
