= OFSAA cross country =

High school cross country championships in Ontario, Canada

The OFSAA Cross Country Championships are the Ontario high school cross country championships, held annually in varying locations around Ontario, usually on the first Saturday of November. Approximately 1600 runners compete in six races, making it the largest OFSAA meet of any sport.

Due to the COVID-19 pandemic, OFSAA announced that all fall and winter championships would be cancelled meaning that the 2020 cross country championships was not held.

== Participation ==
Athletes may qualify to compete in the championships as a team or individually. Each of the eighteen Regional Associations under the OFSAA umbrella host their own qualifying event to select participants for the provincial championships. The top two teams and top five (as of 2026) individuals (excluding runners already qualifying as members of a team) in each age and gender classification from eighteen of the Regional Associations qualify for OFSAA. The host association is able to send a second set of qualifiers (2 more teams and 5 more individuals per event) to the OFSAA championship. Each qualifying team may enter five runners into the competition. This qualification structure results in a maximum of 285 competitors in each event of the championships.

== Event classification ==
The OFSAA championships consist of seven separate races, one for males and one for females in each of three age categories, plus one race for the para athletes which gets divided into separate results for the type of disability and gender.:

- Novice: individuals who were less than 14 years of age on the first day of January of the year in which the competition is held and who are enrolled in the ninth grade
- Junior: individuals who were less than 15 years of age on the first day of January of the year in which the competition is held
- Senior: individuals who were less than 19 years of age on the first day of January of the year in which the competition is held and whose first date of entry into the ninth grade occurred within five years of the date of the competition

== Date and schedule ==
All events of the championship are held on the first Saturday of November unless extraordinary circumstances dictate a change. The order of events is normally:

- novice girls' race
- para race co-ed
- novice boys' race
- junior girls' race
- junior boys' race
- senior girls' race
- senior boys' race
- awards ceremony

The course is open the day before competition for athletes and coaches to walk or run the course. Once races have commenced, the course is closed to all persons excluding those competing in the specific race underway. Any persons infringing upon this rule may cause their school's entire team to be disqualified from competition.

== Course location and specifications ==
The championships are moved around the province on a regional rotation such that they take place in central Ontario (outside of metropolitan Toronto) one year, followed by one year in Toronto, one in eastern Ontario, one in northern Ontario, one in southern Ontario and one in western Ontario. The host Association and exact location for each championship are determined no later than at the OFSAA Annual Meeting held in April of the school year prior to the event.

As cross country is an off-road event, the competition is normally held on a golf course or in a conservation area or other park. Course terrain is uneven and may include steep hills. Ground cover is commonly short grass or dirt but courses may also include sections of sand, gravel and other surfaces.

OFSAA regulations stipulate the following course lengths for each event (±400m):

- novice girls - 4000m
- para race co-ed - 3000m
- novice boys - 4000m
- junior girls - 5000m
- junior boys - 5000m
- senior girls - 6000m
- senior boys - 6000m

The course starting line must be 50 metres in width and include a separate starting box for competitors from each regional Association (and an additional box for the host region). Each starting box must measure 2.5 metres wide and four metres deep.

== Scoring and awards ==
Team scores are determined by summing the finishing places of the top four runners on each team, with lower numeric scores indicating a higher placement for the team. Ties are decided in favour of the team whose fourth runner finished first.

Medals are awarded to the top three teams and top three individuals in each event. Ribbons are awarded to individuals and teams who finish fourth through tenth. A banner is awarded to the school represented by the first place team in each event.

As of 2014, medals are awarded to the top three teams and individuals in each event, with ribbons awarded for all other individuals and teams in the top 10.

== Past champions ==
=== Individual ===
Year	Midget/Novice winner	Junior winner	Senior winner
2024	Aidan Chan-Smith (boys), Chloe Walker (girls)	William Thomas (boys), Kate Nagy (girls)	Daniel Cova (boys), Athena Andrecyk (girls)
2023	William Thomas (boys), Rebecca Pribaz (girls)	Brody Clark (boys), Eleanor Voykin (girls)	Ian McAllister (boys), Emily Cescon (girls)
2022	Jack Gregory (boys), Eleanor Voykin (girls)	Saul Taler (boys), Ava Moric (girls)	Ian McAllister (boys), Gabby Jones (girls)
2021	Dallas St. John (boys), Ava Moric (girls)	David Jiang (boys), Emily Cescon (girls)	Erik Unger (boys), Michelle Gray (girls)
2020	No Event Held (Cancelled due to COVID-19 pandemic)		
2019	Erik Unger (boys), Kyla Martin (girls)	Riley Flemington (boys), Sofia Bowe (girls)	Mathew Mason (boys), Abbey Yuhasz (girls)
2018	Heath McAllister (boys), Aysia Maurice (girls)	Eric Campbell (boys), Emily Bryce (girls)	Evan Burke (boys), Cameron Ormond (girls)
2017	Roman Mironov (boys), Emma Gosselin (girls)	Joe Fast (boys), EJ Boston (girls)	Thomas Witkowicz (boys), Cameron Ormond (girls)
2016	Joe Fast (boys), Haley Davis (girls)	Nick Mota (boys), Cameron Ormond (girls)	Andrew Alexander (boys), Martha MacDonald (girls)
2015	Brock McKenzie (boys), Cameron Ormond (girls)	Thomas Witkowicz (boys), Mei Mei Weston (girls)	Cameron Linscott (boys), Madeline Ghazarian (girls)
2014	Thomas Witkowicz (boys), Brogan MacDougall (girls)	Matieu Plamondon (boys), Shona McCulloch (girls)	Cameron Linscott (boys), Branna McDougall (girls)
2013	Mathieu Plamondon (boys), Shona McColloch (girls)	Owen Day (boys), Bethany Bolton (girls)	Justyn Knight (boys), Charlotte Prouse (girls)
2012	Edward Hayfron (boys), Jessie Fleming (girls)	Muhumed Sirage (boys), Charlotte Prouse (girls)	Ben Flanagan (boys), Gabriela Stafford (girls)
2011	Kieran L'Abbe (boys), Chardae Henry (girls)	Robbie Elmhirst (boys), Mackenzie Lemieux (girls)	Yves Sikubwabo (boys), Jamie Phelan (girls)
2010	Robbie Elmhirst (boys), Megan Rempel (girls)	Ben Flanagan (boys), Hilary Stafford (girls)	Yves Sikubwabo (boys), Jaclyn White (girls)
2009	Ryan Sleiman (boys), Jaime Phelan (girls)	Eamonn Kichuk (boys), Stephanie Rigg (girls)	Tristan Woodfine (boys), Joanna Brown (girls)
2008	Eamonn Kichuk (boys), Cheyenne Hunter (girls)	Tristan Woodfine (boys), Deanna Brasz (girls)	Mohammed Ahmed (boys), Jessica Parry (girls)
2007	Conner Darlington (boys), Kaitlyn Oliver (girls)	Paul Janikowski (boys), Colleen Hennessy (girls)	Mohammed Ahmed (boys), Keesha Danso-Dapaah (girls)
2006	Paul Janikowski (boys), Liane Ouelett-Gaston (girls)	Daryl Smith (boys), Jessica Parry (girls)	Matt Leeder (boys), Danelle Woods (girls)
2005	Ian Donald (boys), Jessica Parry (girls)	Will McFall (boys), Esther Vermeer (girls)	Allan Brett (boys), Kate Van Buskirk (girls)
2004	Darcy Wilson (boys), Laura Twidle (girls)	Matt Leeder (boys), Lindsay Carson (girls)	Jeremy Fisico (boys), Tarah McKay (girls)
2003	Matt Leeder (boys), Lindsay Carson (girls)	Kyle Boorsma (boys), Geneva Winterink (girls)	Henok Lechebo (boys), Tarah McKay (girls)
2002	Rob Brown (boys), Tess Acton (girls)	Braden Novakowski (boys), Alyson Kohlmeier (girls)	Adam Hortian (boys), Diane Nukuri (girls)
2001	Micheal Woods (boys), Alyson Kohlmeier (girls)	Jay Morrill (boys), Megan Brown (girls)	Joseph Dionne (boys), Amy Kohlmeier (girls)
2000	Jay Morril (boys), Alyson Kohlmeier (girls)	Adam Hortian (boys), Nikki Reckmann (girls)	Joseph Dionne (boys), Carol Henry (girls)
