= 2021 FA Cup =

2021 FA Cup may refer to:

- 2020–21 FA Cup
  - 2021 FA Cup final
- 2020–21 Women's FA Cup
  - 2021 Women's FA Cup final
- 2021–22 FA Cup
- 2021–22 Women's FA Cup
