= Canada women's national soccer team =

Canada
- Nickname(s): Les Rouges (The Reds); The Canucks
- Association: Canadian Soccer Association
- Confederation: CONCACAF
- Sub-confederation: NAFU
- Head coach: Casey Stoney
- Captain: Jessie Fleming
- Most caps: Christine Sinclair (331)
- Top scorer: Christine Sinclair (190)
- Home stadium: Various
- FIFA code: CAN
First colours	Second colours

FIFA ranking
- Current: 9 (October 20, 2026)
- Highest: 4 (August–December 2016, June 2017, March 2018)
- Lowest: 13 (December 2005, September 2009, August 2010)

First international
- United States 2–0 Canada (Blaine, United States; July 7, 1986)

Biggest win
- Canada 21–0 Puerto Rico (Etobicoke, Canada; August 28, 1998)

Biggest defeat
- United States 9–1 Canada (Dallas, United States; May 19, 1995); United States 9–1 Canada (Sydney, Australia; June 2, 2000); Norway 9–1 Canada (Honefoss, Norway; June 19, 2001)

World Cup
- Appearances: 8 (first in 1995)
- Best result: Fourth place (2003)

CONCACAF W Championship
- Appearances: 10 (first in 1991)
- Best result: Champions (1998, 2010)

CONCACAF W Gold Cup
- Appearances: 1 (first in 2024)
- Best result: Semi-finals (2024)

Olympic Games
- Appearances: 5 (first in 2008)
- Best result: (gold) Gold (2020)
Medal record
Women's soccer
Summer Olympics
Gold medal – first place	2020 Tokyo	Team
Bronze medal – third place	2012 London	Team
Bronze medal – third place	2016 Rio de Janeiro	Team
CONCACAF W Championship
Gold medal – first place	1998 Canada	Team
Gold medal – first place	2010 Mexico	Team
Silver medal – second place	1991 Haiti	Team
Silver medal – second place	1994 Canada	Team
Silver medal – second place	2002 Canada-United States	Team
Silver medal – second place	2006 United States	Team
Silver medal – second place	2018 United States	Team
Silver medal – second place	2022 Mexico	Team
Pan American Games
Gold medal – first place	2011 Guadalajara	Team
Silver medal – second place	2003 Santo Domingo	Team
Bronze medal – third place	2007 Rio de Janeiro	Team
- Website: Official website

The Canada women's national soccer team (French: Équipe du Canada de soccer féminine) represents Canada in international soccer competitions. They are overseen by the Canadian Soccer Association, the governing body for soccer in Canada.

The team reached international prominence at the 2003 FIFA Women's World Cup, losing in the bronze medal match to the United States. Canada qualified for its first Olympic women's soccer tournament in 2008, making it to the quarter-finals. Canada's most significant achievement has been winning the gold medal at the 2020 Summer Olympics in Tokyo. The team is also two-time CONCACAF Women's Championship winners, and two-time Olympic bronze medallists.

Canada hosted the 2015 FIFA Women's World Cup, where they were eliminated in the quarterfinals by England. Canada set a new tournament and team record for attendance in the process, with 1,353,506 and 54,027, respectively.

== History ==
=== 1986–1999: Early years ===
With many national federations beginning to found national women's teams, the Canadian Soccer Association held an interprovincial All-Star Championship and national camp in Winnipeg in the summer of 1986 for the purpose of assembling the first Canadian roster. The team was officially picked on Canada Day, and after three days' training, travelled by bus to Blaine, Minnesota for a two-game series against the recently founded United States national team. Playing its first international match on July 7, 1986, they were defeated 2–0. Having been advised by coach Neil Turnbull that losing both matches might prompt the early demise of the program itself, Canada won the second 2–1, with both of its goals scored by Geri Donnelly.

As was the case for most international peers, resources were scant, with the inaugural annual budget for the women's team being $12,000, in comparison to the men's team's $1.7 million. The Canadian Press dubbed the first team "long on potential, short on cash." This would be an ongoing theme for much of the program's history. However, as many Canadian players were products of the American NCAA college system, they had experience with that country's much wealthier program. The team made its first overseas journey, to Taiwan, in 1987, with each player raising or otherwise contributing $1500 to cover expenses.

After decades of largely ignoring women's soccer, FIFA agreed to host the 1988 FIFA Women's Invitation Tournament as a trial for a potential women's global championship akin to the men's World Cup. Canada was one of two CONCACAF teams invited to participate, along with the United States. They reached the quarter-finals before being ousted by Sweden. The tournament overall was a success, leading to FIFA establishing the Women's World Cup, with the inaugural 1991 edition in China. Canada sought to secure the lone berth afforded to CONCACAF at the first CONCACAF Women's Championship in Port-au-Prince, Haiti, but was defeated 5–0 in the final by the United States.

Canada's failure to qualify for the 1991 World Cup had an immediate deleterious impact on the team, which would not play another match for two years, leading to nominal coach Sylvie Béliveau remarking that she was "coaching ghosts." The team reunited for the next CONCACAF championship, this time dubbed the 1993 CONCACAF Women's Invitational Tournament and limited to only four teams. Canada again finished second. Canada hosted the 1994 CONCACAF Women's Championship in Montreal, with the tournament held as a World Cup qualifier. They were again runners-up, securing a place at the 1995 FIFA Women's World Cup. At year's end, the Canada Soccer awarded its first Female Player of the Year award to Charmaine Hooper, an original member of the 1986 roster and widely considered the best Canadian player of the era.

Competing at the Women's World Cup in Sweden, Canada played its first match against England on June 6, and was initially down by three goals. The team rallied late in the game, with Helen Stoumbos scoring the country's first-ever World Cup goal (at either men's or women's editions), an Olympico, in the 87th minute. A subsequent goal by Donnelly would see the game end in a 3–2 loss. After a 3–3 draw with Nigeria and a 7–0 rout at the hands of Norway, Canada exited the tournament at the group stage. As a result of this, the team would not qualify for the inaugural women's tournament at the 1996 Summer Olympics, as this was based on placing among the top seven teams at the World Cup.

Canada hosted the 1998 CONCACAF Women's Championship in Toronto, with the United States absent from the competition due to their status as World Cup hosts. Canada defeated Mexico in the final, with Liz Smith scoring the match's lone goal, and earning its first ever major championship gold. Silvana Burtini scored eight goals during the tournament, claiming both the Golden Ball and the Golden Boot.

At the landmark 1999 FIFA Women's World Cup, Canada drew its opening match against Japan, but lost 7–1 to Norway and 4–1 to Russia, exiting at the group stage for the second consecutive time. Hooper, with goals in both losses, was the country's top scorer. The 1999 World Cup marked the final appearances for much of the squad, including Donnelly, who opted to retire from international soccer.

=== 2000–2008: Pellerud and the Sinclair ascendancy ===
Following the disappointment at the 1999 World Cup and resultant failure to qualify for the 2000 Summer Olympics, the CSA sought to recruit a European coach for the national team, ultimately selecting former Norwegian national coach Even Pellerud. After the roster dispersed following the previous year's World Cup, he was provided with no scouting information about the nation's players, and opted to travel across the country holding practice matches to assess available players. Among those he identified was a 16-year-old Christine Sinclair, who he immediately named to the team's roster for the 2000 Algarve Cup, their first event under the new coach. Sinclair would rapidly become the team's most important player in the years ahead. Later in 2000, Canada competed in what was now called the CONCACAF Women's Gold Cup, which this time featured Brazil and China as invitees. Canada faced the United States in the semi-final, losing 4–1. Hooper and Sinclair led the team in scoring with seven and five goals, respectively. Pellerud continued to bring new young players into the roster in the next few years, with the squad for the 2002 CONCACAF Women's Gold Cup including future mainstays Candace Chapman, Carmelina Moscato, and Kara Lang, in addition to Sinclair. Canada reached the final of the Gold Cup, qualifying to the World Cup in the process, but lost 2–1 to the United States after Mia Hamm scored in extra time. Sinclair and Hooper, with seven goals apiece, tied American Tiffeny Milbrett as the tournament's top scorer.

The 2003 FIFA Women's World Cup, held in the United States for the second consecutive time, featured a Canada squad that included veteran players like Hooper, Burtini and Andrea Neil and Pellerud's younger additions, the latter now also including Diana Matheson. The team enjoyed unprecedented success at the tournament, losing its opening match of Group C to eventual champion Germany by 4–1, before defeating Argentina 3–0, and Japan 3–1 to place second in their group and advance to the knockout stage. Canada faced defending silver medallists China in the quarterfinal match. Hooper scored in the seventh minute, in what would later be called the most important moment of her international career, giving Canada a 1–0 upset victory. Canada was defeated by Sweden in the semi-final match 2–1, and faced the United States in the third-place match, where they were defeated 3–1 and finished fourth at the tournament. Hooper was subsequently named to the All-Star Team, a first for a Canadian player.

While Canada's fourth-place finish at the World Cup would have been sufficient to qualify for the prior two Summer Olympics, in advance of the 2004 Summer Olympics in Athens the qualification format had been changed to involve federation qualifying tournaments. Canada enter the 2004 CONCACAF Women's Pre-Olympic Tournament as heavy favourites to qualify, but were unexpectedly ousted by Mexico in the semi-final, missing the Olympics for the third time. In light of their results the prior year, Sinclair would later admit "we'd planned our lives around going to the Olympics. Not qualifying was the biggest low."

Pellerud sought to improve training conditions and professional standards for the historically underfunded women's team, persuading Greg Kerfoot, the owner of the Vancouver Whitecaps in the men's USL First Division, to help finance a residency program that would allow players to earn a salary and focus on playing soccer full-time in the years leading up to the next World Cup and Olympics. However, this led to conflict between the coach and some players, with Hooper, Christine Latham and Sharolta Nonen alleging that they had been inappropriately pressured to play for the Whitecaps' women's team as part of the residency program. As a result, they were all suspended in advance of the 2006 CONCACAF Women's Gold Cup. Sinclair and the rest of the team expressed support for Pellerud, and an arbitrator subsequently found he had acted appropriately. The dispute marked the end of Hooper's twenty-year career with the national team, and Sinclair replaced her as captain.

Canada's results at the Gold Cup qualified them for the 2007 FIFA Women's World Cup in China. In Group C, the team lost 2–1 to Norway in its opening match. A 4–0 victory against Ghana followed, with Sinclair managing a brace. Sinclair scored another goal in the 85th minute of the final group stage match against Australia, which would have been sufficient to advance to the knockout stage had it held, but Australia equalized in stoppage time and Canada exited the tournament. Later in the year, the team won a bronze medal at the 2007 Pan American Games, in what was widely considered an unimpressive performance marked by player complaints about overtraining.

The CSA declined the opportunity to host the 2008 CONCACAF Women's Olympic Qualifying Tournament, saying they could not afford the estimated $400,000 expenditure, a decision Pellerud publicly criticized. Canada defeated Mexico in a semi-final rematch from four years' prior, earning its first Olympic berth, in what Sinclair called "sweet revenge." The 1–1 event final eventually saw the United States prevail on penalties. At the women's tournament at the 2008 Summer Olympics in Beijing, Canada defeated Argentina 2–1, with Chapman scoring Canada's first Olympic goal and Lang providing the winner. The team advanced out of the group stage before being defeated by the United States, the eventual gold medallists, in their quarter-final match, with Sinclair scoring Canada's lone goal in the 2–1 loss.

Following the Olympics, Pellerud retired from coaching the national team. In assessments of his tenure, he was credited by Matheson for having created "a competitive, professional-feeling team. Before that, it was just sporadic camps a couple of times a year." Some, such as future CSA General Secretary Jason DeVos, argued that his tactics had become outdated by 2008, in light of developments in the women's game. Pellerud himself would later say he had left "a solid foundation, so it was the right time for a new coach to come in with a new view."

=== 2009–2011: Initial success under Morace, World Cup nadir ===
The CSA recruited Carolina Morace, formerly both a player and coach for the Italian national team, to serve as Canada's next coach. Building on critiques of the team that had been made toward the end of Pellerud's tenure, which was described as having "a one-dimensional style of play that emphasized the long ball, physical strength and endurance" Morace sought to introduce the team to a new approach with greater emphasis on what The Globe & Mail would later describe as "the gift of style, of beautiful, technically and tactically advanced soccer."

Morace's new approach enjoyed great initial success, culminating in Canada's victory at the CONCACAF championship, this time called the 2010 CONCACAF Women's World Cup Qualifying. With the United States unexpectedly ousted in the semi-final, Canada faced Mexico in the final, winning 1–0 with Sinclair scoring to take the first major senior title of her tenure. By February 2011, Canada had risen to ninth in the FIFA Women's World Ranking, its highest placement in four years. However, despite this success, Morace and the team found themselves enmeshed in disputes with the CSA over funding and compensation. On February 4, 2011, Morace announced that she would quit following the World Cup, citing strategic differences with the federation. Days later, the team itself went on strike in support of her, eventually returning to the pitch after the CSA began talks with Morace to resolve differences. She ultimately agreed to rescind her resignation after an agreement was reached to create a management group for the team involving parties including Own the Podium. As part of the agreement, the women's team was to train for the World Cup in Morace's home nation of Italy.

At the 2011 FIFA Women's World Cup, Canada faced host nation Germany in its opener, a 2–1 defeat most noteworthy for Sinclair scoring a goal despite having her nose broken by a German player earlier in the match. A 4–0 rout at the hands of France formally eliminated Canada from the tournament. Sinclair would later describe it was "the lowest point in my soccer career, the worst game I'd ever seen our team play." Canada went on to lose 1–0 to Nigeria. Morace resigned as coach following the team's last-place finish, as did her coaching staff. While generally praised for her tactical improvements, and having taken the team to a new high of sixth in the FIFA Rankings, some members of the team would subsequently say that they felt Morace had unnecessarily devalued "what makes us Canadian -- the fight that puts fear in other teams."

=== 2011–2018: Herdman's "bronze age" and 2015 World Cup ===
Englishman John Herdman, the erstwhile coach of the New Zealand national team, was hired as Canada's next coach in August 2011. Herdman sought to build on Morace's approach to the team. In time, this would be regarded as arguably the most consequential hiring in the history of Canadian soccer. Less than two months into the new coach's tenure, the team won gold at the 2011 Pan American Games, defeating Brazil in a penalty shootout in the final.

The 2012 CONCACAF Women's Olympic Qualifying Tournament was hosted in Canada. Victory over Mexico in the semi-final secured qualification, but Canada was defeated 4–0 by the United States in the final. The 2012 Summer Olympics in London began in unpromising fashion with a loss to Japan. After defeating South Africa and drawing Sweden, Canada nevertheless advanced out of the group stage as the third seed, led by performances from Sinclair and Melissa Tancredi. Canada faced host nation Great Britain in the quarter-final, defeating them 2–0. This led to a historic Olympic semi-final against the United States at Old Trafford that saw the Americans prevail 4–3, with Sinclair recording a hat-trick. The game was noted both for its high quality of play and for the controversial calls made by referee Christina Pedersen, who many felt had wrongly penalized Canadian goalkeeper Erin McLeod for time-wasting, which penalty had in turn allowed the United States to tie the game. Canada would go on to the third-place game, Matheson scoring to secure the women's first-ever Olympic medal.

The London Olympics had a significant legacy for the women's national team, elevating both its profile and that of captain Christine Sinclair, and helping to make Canada a rare instance where the women's team enjoyed significantly greater visibility than the men's team. Sinclair became the first soccer player to win the Bobbie Rosenfeld Award as Canadian female athlete of the year, and the first soccer player, male or female, to win the Lou Marsh Trophy as athlete of the year. She was soon called "the face of Canadian soccer." The team received the Canadian Press Team of the Year Award, another first for soccer.

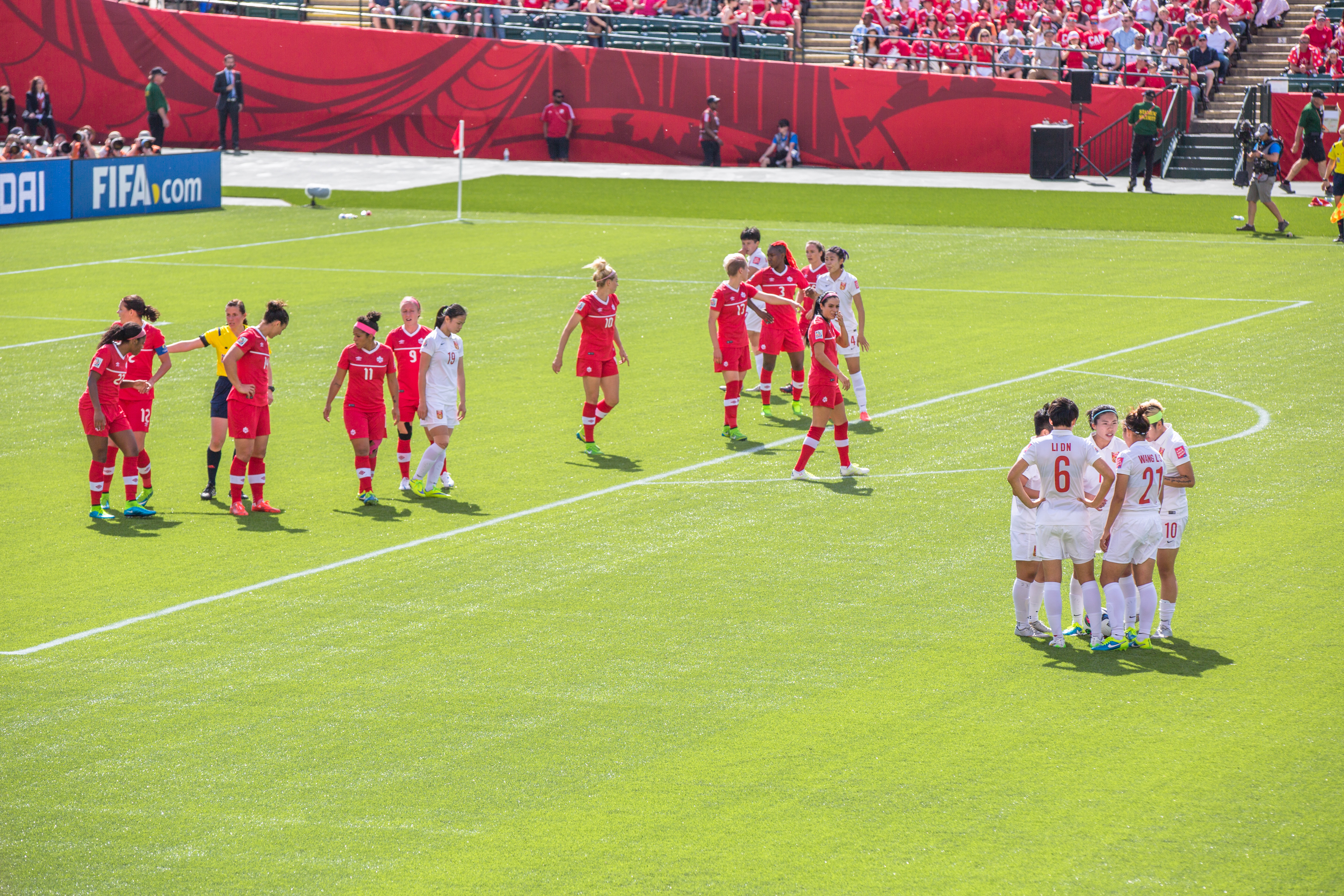
Canada facing China in the opening match of the 2015 Women's World Cup

2015 was Canada's "summer of soccer hosting," with the country awarded both the 2015 FIFA Women's World Cup and the 2015 Pan American Games, in addition to matches of the men's Gold Cup. In light of the women's team's last-place finish in 2011 and its subsequent bronze medal at the Olympics, there were expectations on the team to perform on home soil. Herdman expressed a desire "to aim high and make sure 2015 is a memorable year for Canada," in the hopes of accelerating the growth of support for both women's soccer and the sport in general. In the World Cup's Group A, Canada defeated China by 1–0 in its opening match, on the strength of a Sinclair penalty kick. They drew the remaining two group stage matches, but finished first in the group and faced Switzerland in the Round of 16. Defeating the Swiss 1–0 in the opening of the knockout stage, Canada advanced to face England. In the quarter-final, Sinclair scored Canada's lone goal in the 42nd minute, with Canada ultimately losing the match 2–1. The result was generally considered underwhelming, highlight the team's struggles with offence from players other than Sinclair. Centre-back Kadeisha Buchanan earned distinction at the tournament, being named the winner of the FIFA Young Player Award and a place on the All-Star Squad. Later in the summer, Buchanan joined the Canadian squad for the Pan American women's tournament, alongside other touted emerging talents such as Jessie Fleming, Janine Beckie, Ashley Lawrence, Quinn, and Shelina Zadorsky. Canada reached the semi-finals, losing there to Colombia, before also losing the bronze medal match to Mexico. At year's end, Buchanan received the CSA's Female Player of the Year award, ending an eleven-year Sinclair winning streak, and was also shortlisted for the FIFA Ballon d'Or.

Canada next focused on qualifying for the 2016 Summer Olympics in Rio de Janeiro. The team reached the final of the 2016 CONCACAF Women's Olympic Qualifying Championship, thereby qualifying to the Olympic Games, and losing the championship match to the United States 2–0. A month later, they won the 2016 edition of the Algarve Cup, defeating upcoming Olympic host nation Brazil in the final. At the Olympic women's tournament, Canada swept its three group stage games, culminating in a historic win over Germany that broke a 12-game, 22-year losing streak. Canada defeated France in the quarter-final, but was defeated in a semi-final rematch with Germany by 2–1. Playing in the bronze medal game for the second consecutive Olympics, Sinclair scored the game-winning goal against Brazil.

In 2017, Herdman informed the CSA that he hoped to transition to men's coaching following the next World Cup. However, disagreements with then-current national men's coach Octavio Zambrano led to this opportunity emerging earlier than expected, and he was announced as the next Canadian men's coach in January 2018, a move that came as a surprise to the women's team. Herdman would later express regret that the news had not been delivered better. Stylistically, the team during his tenure was at its best known for "defending well and being opportunistic on attack." Conversely, goal-scoring outside of Sinclair remained a constant question. Herdman was credited for his motivational skills, and for continued improvements to the team's infrastructure. At the time of his departure, Canada sat fifth in the FIFA Rankings, a new highpoint. The Canadian Olympic Committee called the Herdman era "the bronze age."

=== 2018–2023: Tokyo Olympic gold and Sinclair era's end ===
Assistant coach Kenneth Heiner-Møller, previously a coach of the Danish women's team, was named as the next head coach for Canada. Canada pursued World Cup qualification at the 2018 CONCACAF Women's Championship, routing Panama 7–0 in the semi-final to secure a berth. They were defeated by the United States in the final 2–0.

At the 2019 FIFA Women's World Cup, Canada narrowly defeated Cameroon in its opening group stage match, with Buchanan scoring the winning header. After defeating New Zealand, Canada faced the Netherlands in its final group match, losing 2–1, with Sinclair's goal equalling Brazilian Marta's achievement of scoring in five different World Cups. Facing Sweden in the Round of 16, Canada was down 1–0 when they were awarded a penalty after a hand ball by a Swedish defender. While Sinclair commonly took penalties for the team, in this instance she was aware that Swedish keeper Hedvig Lindahl had saved her penalty attempt at the Algarve Cup the previous March, and opted to have Beckie take it instead. Beckie's attempt was saved by Lindahl, and Canada were ultimately eliminated. The performance of the national team was widely critiqued in the aftermath of the event, with many commentators faulting the lack of goal-scoring threat from players other than Sinclair.

During the 2020 CONCACAF Women's Olympic Qualifying Championship, Sinclair scored her 185th career international goal, breaking the record previously set by American Abby Wambach. Canada reached the tournament final, thereby qualifying for the Olympics, and lost 3–0 to the United States in the final. The onset of the COVID-19 pandemic resulted in the Olympics being delayed by a year. Heiner-Møller had originally intended to depart for a job with the Danish Football Association following the conclusion of the Olympic tournament, but due to the change in scheduling, he instead left in advance of it in the summer of 2020.

In October 2020, the CSA hired Bev Priestman as the next head coach. She had previously coached the Canadian women's youth teams and served as an assistant to Herdman before leaving for a job with The Football Association. Looking ahead to the Tokyo Olympics, she said her intent was "to change the colour of the medal." The Olympic women's tournament commenced with a 1–1 draw against hosts Japan, with Sinclair scoring in her 300th appearance. Goalkeeper Stephanie Labbé was injured in a collision, but played through it to make a key penalty save before exiting the match. Beckie scored twice for a 2–1 victory against Chile, before Canada managed another draw against Great Britain to conclude the group stage. A scoreless quarterfinal match against Brazil was decided on penalties, Canada prevailing 4–3, with a returning Labbé a standout in goal. After missing her own penalty attempt, Sinclair advised Priestman that Fleming should take future penalties, which she did decisively in the semi-final match with the United States, Canada winning 1–0. This was the team's first victory over the Americans in twenty years. Fleming scored another penalty in the final against Sweden, which ended 1–1 after extra-time. Canada eventually won the match 3–2 on penalty kicks to capture the gold medal in women's soccer for the first time, with Julia Grosso scoring the clinching goal. The result was hailed as the biggest victory in Canadian soccer history, and a capstone to Sinclair's tenure.

The immediate post-Olympic period saw the retirement of Labbé, who had achieved significant fame as a result of her performance in Tokyo, with Kailen Sheridan becoming the team's new starting goalkeeper in advance of the 2022 CONCACAF W Championship. Grosso scored the lone goal in a group match with Panama to send Canada to the semi-final and secure World Cup qualification. Canada defeated Jamaica in the semi-final, before losing 1–0 to the United States in the final.

Longstanding disputes with the CSA over compensation and program funding led to the players calling a strike ahead of the 2023 SheBelieves Cup, but under threat of legal action from the federation they agreed to resume training. With morale low, the team performed poorly and finished last among the four participants. The team played only one additional match prior to the 2023 FIFA Women's World Cup, a 2–1 loss to France in April. Canada was drawn into Group B, entering as one of the favourites to advance, but with questions raised around the team's offensive capabilities, injuries to key players, and the off-field disputes with the CSA. With Fleming now widely identified as the team's most important player, an injury in the pre-tournament that left her unavailable for the opening match against Nigeria was a setback. The match ended in a 0–0 draw, with Nigerian goalkeeper Chiamaka Nnadozie saving a Sinclair penalty attempt. The match renewed concerns about offense. After a poor first half against Ireland, Canada mounted a comeback for a 2–1 victory. Canada entered the final group match against co-host Australia needing only a draw to advance to the Round of 16, but were routed 4–0 by the Australians, exiting the tournament. They became the first reigning Olympic champions not to advance to the knockout stages of the World Cup. Assessments of the team once again criticized its lack of scoring potential with Sinclair no longer in her prime, as well as its struggles to keep up with evolution of the women's game internationally.

Following the disappointment at the World Cup, doubts were raised about the team's prospects in its September CONCACAF Olympic qualification playoff against Jamaica, with the latter team having performed unexpectedly well at the World Cup and reached the Round of 16. Priestman made a number of changes to her configurations, including starting perennial substitute Cloé Lacasse and relative newcomers Jade Rose and Sydney Collins. Canada defeated Jamaica by an aggregate score of 4–1 across the two matches, securing its fifth consecutive Olympic berth. Sinclair notably featured in only thirty minutes, coming on as a substitute during the second game at BMO Field. Having achieved Olympic qualification, Sinclair announced that she would retire at year's end, having been persuaded to play in a "farewell tour" that saw the team play four matches across the country, including its first in the Maritimes since 2012. The tour concluded with Sinclair's final match on December 5, 2023, held at BC Place in Vancouver, renamed "Christine Sinclair Place" for the occasion. Canada defeated Australia 1–0 before a crowd of 48,112, a national record for a women's friendly, with Sinclair starting the match and being substituted off early in the second half. Her departure was called the end of an era for Canadian soccer.

=== 2024–present: New era ===
In advance of the 2024 CONCACAF W Gold Cup, Fleming was named the new team captain. Canada won its group and finished first in the overall tournament seeding, ultimately reaching a semi-final matchup with the United States. Tied 2–2 after extra time, they lost 1–3 on penalties.

In July 2024, prior to the start of the 2024 Summer Olympics, members of the team's staff were accused of using a camera drone to covertly record a practice by New Zealand—the opponent of Canada's first group stage match—at Stade Geoffroy-Guichard in Saint-Étienne. Team analyst Joseph Lombardi was detained by local police for operating the drone. Lombardi, assistant coach Jasmine Mander, and later Priestman, were dismissed and sent home by Canada Soccer. The COC reported that New Zealand had asked FIFA to not award points to Canada for the July 25 match. New Zealand Football said that they had sought "urgent action" from the FIFA Disciplinary Committee. On July 27, FIFA announced that it had deducted six points from Canada in the tournament, fined Canada Soccer 200,000 francs, and suspended Priestman, Lombardi, and Mander for one year. Canada defeated New Zealand and France by identical scores of 2–1 and Colombia 1–0, advancing to the knockout round despite the six-point deduction. Fleming called it "the most unique group stage that I've ever played in." After playing Germany to a scoreless draw in the quarter-final match, they were ousted from the tournament on penalties. After an external investigation, Priestman, Mander, and Lombardi were officially fired for their role in the drone scandal.

In January 2025, Casey Stoney was named as the new head coach. In February, Canada captured the 2025 Pinatar Cup, marking Stoney’s first trophy in charge and signalling early progress in restoring stability after the turmoil of 2024. The unbeaten run also provided needed competitive continuity, helping re-establish cohesion while integrating new players into the squad.

== Results and fixtures ==
The following is a list of match results in the last 12 months, as well as any future matches that have been scheduled.

Legend

Win Draw Loss Fixture

=== 2025 ===
November 29 Friendly	Japan	3–0	Canada	Nagasaki, Japan
	Tanikawa 43'; Tanaka 51'; Fujino 68'	Report		Stadium: Peace Stadium; Attendance: 8,634

December 2 Friendly	Japan	1–0	Canada	Isahaya, Japan
	Tanaka 45'	Report		Stadium: Transcosmos Stadium Nagasaki

=== 2026 ===
March 1 2026 SheBelieves Cup	Canada	4–1	Colombia	Nashville, United States
14:00 ET	Gilles 31'; Sonis 67'; Collins 73'; Prince 90'	Report	Santos 81' (pen.); (yellow card) 64' (yellow-red card) 83' Robledo	Stadium: Geodis Park; Referee: Katja Koroleva (United States)

March 4 2026 SheBelieves Cup	United States	1–0	Canada	Columbus, United States
18:45 ET	Sentnor 55'	Report		Stadium: ScottsMiracle-Gro Field; Referee: Lizzet García (Mexico)

March 7 2026 SheBelieves Cup	Canada	0–0 (3–2 p)	Argentina	Harrison, United States
12:30 ET		Report		Stadium: Sports Illustrated Stadium; Referee: Alyssa Pennington (United States)
	Penalties
	Huitema (penalty missed); Fleming (penalty scored); Sonis (penalty scored); Grosso (penalty scored)		(penalty missed) Cometti; (penalty missed) Braun; (penalty scored) Holzeier; (penalty scored) Vargas; (penalty missed) Preininger

April 11 2026 FIFA Series	Canada	4–0	Zambia	Cuiabá, Brazil
15:30 ET	Prince 41', 45+2'; Chukwu 80', 88'	Report (FIFA)		Stadium: Arena Pantanal; Referee: Emikar Calderas (Venezuela)

April 14 2026 FIFA Series	Canada	3–1	South Korea	Cuiabá, Brazil
15:30 ET	Viens 23'; Gilles 50', 70'	Report (FIFA)	Kim Shin-ji 29'	Stadium: Arena Pantanal

April 18 2026 FIFA Series	Brazil	1–0	Canada	Cuiabá, Brazil
21:30 ET	Gomes 47'	Report (FIFA)		Stadium: Arena Pantanal

June 9 Friendly	Costa Rica	0–6	Canada	Santa Ana, Costa Rica
21:30 ET	Coto (red card) 53'	Report	Viens 7'; Sonis 41', 54' (pen.), 78' (pen.); Huitema 84'; Alidou 90+2'	Stadium: Estadio Piedades de Santa Ana

October 9 Friendly	Canada	1–1	Denmark	Montreal, Quebec
7:00PM ET	Smith 84'	Report	Harder 24'	Stadium: Stade Saputo

October 12 Friendly	Canada	3–4	Denmark	Toronto, Ontario
3:30PM ET	Pridham 10'; Viens 49'; Smith 70'	Report	Holdt 23', 32'; Harder 27'; Thomsen 61'	Stadium: BMO Field

November 28 2026 CONCACAF W Championship QF	Canada	v	Panama	Mansfield, United States
12ː00 CT				Stadium: Texas Health Mansfield Stadium

== Coaching staff ==
=== Current staff ===
As of July 24, 2026

Position	Staff
Head coach	(England) Casey Stoney
Assistant coach	(England) Neil Wood
Assistant coach	(Wales) Eleri Earnshaw
Goalkeeper coach	(England) Ian Willcock
Performance analyst	(Canada) Yianni Michelis

=== Coaching history ===
Name	Nation	From	To
Neil Turnbull	Canada	1986	1991
Sylvie Béliveau	Canada	1993	1995
Neil Turnbull	Canada	1996	1999
Even Pellerud	Norway	2000	2008
Carolina Morace	Italy	2009	2011
John Herdman	England	2011	2018
Kenneth Heiner-Møller	Denmark	2018	2020
Bev Priestman	England	2020	2024
Casey Stoney	England	2025	present

== Players ==
=== Current squad ===
The following players were called up for the 2026 CONCACAF W Championship matches between 27 November and 5 December 2026.

Caps and goals correct as of 12 October 2026, after the match against Denmark.

No.	Pos.	Player	Date of birth (age)	Caps	Goals	Club
1	GK	Kailen Sheridan	July 16, 1995 (age 31)	71	0	(United States Soccer Federation) North Carolina Courage
18	GK	Sabrina D'Angelo	May 11, 1993 (age 33)	25	0	(Canadian Soccer Association) AFC Toronto
22	GK	Lysianne Proulx	April 17, 1999 (age 27)	3	0	(The Football Association) Ipswich Town
3	DF	Kadeisha Buchanan	November 5, 1995 (age 31)	159	6	(The Football Association) Chelsea
4	DF	Shelina Zadorsky	October 24, 1992 (age 34)	121	8	(Canadian Soccer Association) AFC Toronto
5	DF	Gabrielle Carle	October 12, 1998 (age 28)	64	1	(United States Soccer Federation) Washington Spirit
10	DF	Ashley Lawrence	June 11, 1995 (age 31)	154	8	(French Football Federation) Lyon
12	DF	Jade Rose	February 12, 2003 (age 23)	43	1	(The Football Association) Manchester City
16	DF	Janine Sonis	August 20, 1994 (age 32)	132	40	(United States Soccer Federation) Denver Summit
26	DF	Élisabeth Tsé	December 7, 2002 (age 23)	2	0	(United States Soccer Federation) Washington Spirit
	DF	Jayde Riviere	January 22, 2001 (age 25)	56	1	(The Football Association) Manchester United
7	MF	Julia Grosso	August 29, 2000 (age 26)	86	5	(United States Soccer Federation) Chicago Stars
8	MF	Emma Regan	January 28, 2000 (age 26)	23	1	(United States Soccer Federation) Denver Summit
13	MF	Simi Awujo	September 23, 2003 (age 23)	37	1	(The Football Association) Manchester United
17	MF	Jessie Fleming (captain)	March 11, 1998 (age 28)	159	20	(United States Soccer Federation) Portland Thorns
19	MF	Marie-Yasmine Alidou	April 28, 1995 (age 31)	24	6	(Canadian Soccer Association) Montreal Roses
23	MF	Carly Wickenheiser	March 6, 1997 (age 29)	8	0	(United States Soccer Federation) North Carolina Courage
9	FW	Olivia Smith	August 5, 2004 (age 22)	25	6	(The Football Association) Arsenal
11	FW	Evelyne Viens	February 6, 1997 (age 29)	51	11	(French Football Federation) Paris
20	FW	Cloé Lacasse	July 7, 1993 (age 33)	48	6	(United States Soccer Federation) Utah Royals
21	FW	Delaney Baie Pridham	September 1, 1997 (age 29)	9	1	(Canadian Soccer Association) Ottawa Rapid
24	FW	Kaylee Hunter	January 22, 2008 (age 18)	4	0	(Canadian Soccer Association) AFC Toronto
	FW	Nichelle Prince ^{TOP}	February 19, 1995 (age 31)	119	20	(United States Soccer Federation) Boston Legacy
	FW	Annabelle Chukwu	February 8, 2007 (age 19)	7	2	(United States Soccer Federation) Notre Dame Fighting Irish

=== Recent call-ups ===
The following players have also been called up to the squad within the past 12 months.

Pos.	Player	Date of birth (age)	Caps	Goals	Club	Latest call-up
GK	Melissa Dagenais ^{PRE}	December 7, 2000 (age 25)	0	0	(Canada) Ottawa Rapid	v. Denmark, 9 October 2026
GK	Emily Burns	July 24, 1997 (age 29)	0	0	(France) Nantes	2026 SheBelieves Cup
DF	Allysha Chapman ^{RET}	January 25, 1989 (age 37)	100	2	(United States) Houston Dash	v. Denmark, 12 October 2026
DF	Sydney Collins	September 8, 1999 (age 27)	16	1	(United States) Bay FC	v. Denmark, 12 October 2026
DF	Brooklyn Courtnall	December 28, 2002 (age 23)	2	0	(United States) San Diego Wave	v. Denmark, 12 October 2026
DF	Vanessa Gilles ^{INJ}	March 11, 1996 (age 30)	63	11	(Germany) Bayern Munich	v. Denmark, 9 October 2026
DF	Marie Levasseur	May 18, 1997 (age 29)	18	0	(England) Birmingham City	2026 FIFA Women's Series
DF	Megan Reid	July 8, 1996 (age 30)	3	1	(United States) Denver Summit	2026 SheBelieves Cup
MF	Jordyn Listro	August 10, 1995 (age 31)	2	0	(United States) Tampa Bay Sun	v. Costa Rica, 9 June 2026
MF	Florianne Jourde	November 5, 2004 (age 22)	2	0	(France) Paris Saint-Germain	v. Japan, 2 December 2025
FW	Jordyn Huitema	May 8, 2001 (age 25)	98	24	(United States) Chicago Stars	v. Costa Rica, 9 June 2026
FW	Holly Ward	October 25, 2003 (age 23)	10	2	(United States) Seattle Reign	v. Costa Rica, 9 June 2026
FW	Adriana Leon	October 2, 1992 (age 34)	132	44	(United States) San Diego Wave	v. Japan, 2 December 2025
Notes: ^{INJ} = Withdrew due to injury; ^{PRE} = Preliminary squad; ^{RET} = Retired from the national team; ^{TOP} = Train-on player

== Individual records ==
As of 12 October 2026

Players in bold are still active with the national team.

=== Most appearances ===
Rank	Player	Career	Caps	Goals
1	Christine Sinclair	2000–2023	331	190
2	Sophie Schmidt	2005–2023	226	20
3	Diana Matheson	2003–2021	206	19
4	Desiree Scott	2010–2025	188	0
5	Rhian Wilkinson	2003–2017	181	7
6	**Kadeisha Buchanan**	2013–present	159	6
6	**Jessie Fleming**	2013–present	159	20
8	**Ashley Lawrence**	2013–present	154	8
9	**Adriana Leon**	2013–present	132	44
9	Andrea Neil	1991–2007	132	24
9	Brittany Baxter	2002–2014	132	5
9	**Janine Sonis**	2014–present	132	40

=== Top goalscorers ===
Rank	Player	Career	Goals	Caps	Avg.
1	Christine Sinclair (list)	2000–2023	190	331	0.57
2	Charmaine Hooper	1986–2006	71	129	0.55
3	**Adriana Leon**	2013–present	44	132	0.33
4	**Janine Sonis**	2014–present	40	132	0.30
5	Silvana Burtini	1987–2003	38	77	0.49
6	Kara Lang	2002–2010	34	92	0.37
7	Melissa Tancredi	2004–2017	27	125	0.22
8	**Jordyn Huitema**	2017–present	24	98	0.24
8	Andrea Neil	1991–2007	24	132	0.18
10	**Nichelle Prince**	2013–present	20	119	0.17
10	**Jessie Fleming**	2013–present	20	159	0.13
10	Sophie Schmidt	2003–2023	20	226	0.09

=== Most assists ===
Rank	Name	Career	Caps	Assists
1	Christine Sinclair	2000–2023	331	54
2	**Janine Sonis**	2014–present	132	25
3	Diana Matheson	2003–2021	206	23
4	Sophie Schmidt	2005–2023	226	22
4	Rhian Wilkinson	2003–2017	181	22
6	Melissa Tancredi	2004–2017	125	20
7	**Ashley Lawrence**	2013–present	154	19
8	**Jessie Fleming**	2013–present	159	15
9	**Nichelle Prince**	2013–present	119	14
9	Charmaine Hooper	1986–2006	129	14

=== Most clean sheets (five or more) ===
Rank	Name	Career	Caps	Clean sheets
1	Erin McLeod	2002–2022	119	49
2	Karina LeBlanc	1998–2015	110	47
3	Stephanie Labbé	2008–2022	86	45
4	**Kailen Sheridan**	2016–present	71	33
5	**Sabrina D'Angelo**	2010–present	25	12
6	Nicci Wright	1996–2002	37	11
7	Carla Chin	1987–1995	29	8
8	Wendy Hawthorne	1990–1995	15	6
9	Taryn Swiatek	2001–2007	24	5

== Competitive record ==
Champions Runners-up Third place Fourth place Tournament played fully or partially on home soil

=== FIFA Women's World Cup ===
FIFA Women's World Cup record
Year	Round	Position	Pld	W	D*	L	GF	GA	Squad
(China) 1991	Did not qualify								
(Sweden) 1995	Group stage	10th	3	0	1	2	5	13	Squad
(United States) 1999	Group stage	12th	3	0	1	2	3	12	Squad
(United States) 2003	Fourth place	4th	6	3	0	3	10	10	Squad
(China) 2007	Group stage	9th	3	1	1	1	7	4	Squad
(Germany) 2011	Group stage	16th	3	0	0	3	1	7	Squad
(Canada) 2015	Quarter-finals	6th	5	2	2	1	4	3	Squad
(France) 2019	Round of 16	11th	4	2	0	2	4	3	Squad
(Australia) (New Zealand) 2023	Group stage	21st	3	1	1	1	2	5	Squad
(Brazil) 2027	To be determined								
(Costa Rica) (Jamaica) (Mexico) (United States) 2031	To be determined								
(United Kingdom) 2035	To be determined								
Total	Fourth place	8/12	30	9	6	15	36	57	—N/a

*Denotes draws include knockout matches decided via penalty shoot-out.

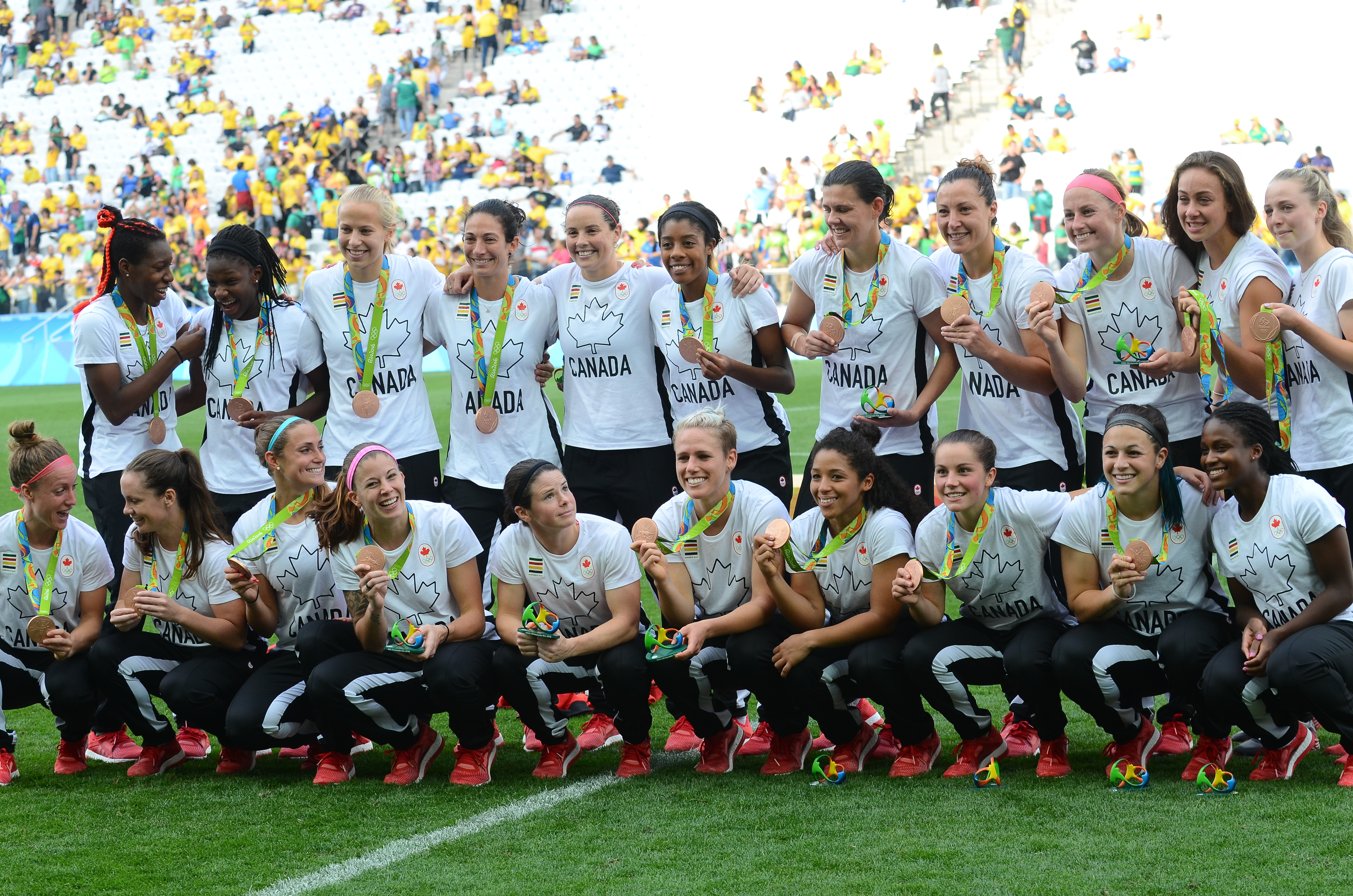
The team defeated Brazil for the bronze medal at the 2016 Olympics in Rio

FIFA Women's World Cup history
Year	Round	Date	Opponent	Result	Stadium
(Sweden) 1995	Group stage	June 6	England	L 2–3	Olympia Stadion, Helsingborg
(Sweden) 1995	Group stage	June 8	Nigeria	D 3–3	Olympia Stadion, Helsingborg
(Sweden) 1995	Group stage	June 10	Norway	L 0–7	Strömvallen, Gävle
(United States) 1999	Group stage	June 19	Japan	D 1–1	Spartan Stadium, San Jose
(United States) 1999	Group stage	June 23	Norway	L 1–7	Jack Kent Cooke Stadium, Landover
(United States) 1999	Group stage	June 26	Russia	L 1–4	Giants Stadium, East Rutherford
(United States) 2003	Group stage	September 20	Germany	L 1–4	Columbus Crew Stadium, Columbus
(United States) 2003	Group stage	September 24	Argentina	W 3–0	Columbus Crew Stadium, Columbus
(United States) 2003	Group stage	September 27	Japan	W 3–1	Gillette Stadium, Foxborough
(United States) 2003	Quarter-finals	October 2	China	W 1–0	Civic Stadium, Portland
(United States) 2003	Semi-finals	October 5	Sweden	L 1–2	Civic Stadium, Portland
(United States) 2003	Third place play-off	October 11	United States	L 1–3	The Home Depot Center, Carson
(China) 2007	Group stage	September 12	Norway	L 1–2	Yellow Dragon Sports Center, Hangzhou
(China) 2007	Group stage	September 15	Ghana	W 4–0	Yellow Dragon Sports Center, Hangzhou
(China) 2007	Group stage	September 20	Australia	D 2–2	Chengdu Sports Center, Chengdu
(Germany) 2011	Group stage	June 26	Germany	L 1–2	Olympiastadion, Berlin
(Germany) 2011	Group stage	June 30	France	L 0–4	Ruhrstadion, Bochum
(Germany) 2011	Group stage	July 5	Nigeria	L 0–1	Rudolf-Harbig-Stadion, Dresden
(Canada) 2015	Group stage	June 6	China	W 1–0	Commonwealth Stadium, Edmonton
(Canada) 2015	Group stage	June 11	New Zealand	D 0–0	Commonwealth Stadium, Edmonton
(Canada) 2015	Group stage	June 15	Netherlands	D 1–1	Olympic Stadium, Montreal
(Canada) 2015	Round of 16	June 21	Switzerland	W 1–0	BC Place, Vancouver
(Canada) 2015	Quarter-finals	June 27	England	L 1–2	BC Place, Vancouver
(France) 2019	Group stage	June 10	Cameroon	W 1–0	Stade de la Mosson, Montpellier
(France) 2019	Group stage	June 15	New Zealand	W 2–0	Stade des Alpes, Grenoble
(France) 2019	Group stage	June 20	Netherlands	L 1–2	Stade Auguste-Delaune, Reims
(France) 2019	Round of 16	June 24	Sweden	L 0–1	Parc des Princes, Paris
(Australia) (New Zealand) 2023	Group stage	July 21	Nigeria	D 0–0	Melbourne Rectangular Stadium, Melbourne
(Australia) (New Zealand) 2023	Group stage	July 26	Republic of Ireland	W 2–1	Perth Rectangular Stadium, Perth
(Australia) (New Zealand) 2023	Group stage	July 31	Australia	L 0–4	Melbourne Rectangular Stadium, Melbourne

=== Olympic Games ===
Olympic Games record
Year	Round	Position	Pld	W	D*	L	GF	GA	Squad
(United States) 1996	Did not qualify								
(Australia) 2000	Did not qualify								
(Greece) 2004	Did not qualify								
(China) 2008	Quarter-finals	8th	4	1	1	2	5	6	Squad
(United Kingdom) 2012	Bronze medal	3rd	6	3	1	2	12	8	Squad
(Brazil) 2016	Bronze medal	3rd	6	5	0	1	10	5	Squad
(Japan) 2020	Gold medal	1st	6	2	4	0	6	4	Squad
(France) 2024	Quarter-finals	7th	4	3	1	0	5	2	Squad
(United States) 2028	To be determined								
Total	Gold medal	5/8	26	14	7	5	38	25	—N/a

*Denotes draws include knockout matches decided via penalty shoot-out.

=== CONCACAF W Championship ===
CONCACAF W Championship record
Year	Result	Pld	W	D*	L	GF	GA
(Haiti) 1991	Runners-up	5	4	0	1	23	5
(United States) 1993	Third place	3	1	1	1	4	1
(Canada) 1994	Runners-up	4	3	0	1	18	6
(Canada) 1998	Champions	5	5	0	0	42	0
(United States) 2000	Fourth place	5	2	0	3	20	12
(Canada) (United States) 2002	Runners-up	5	4	0	1	26	3
(United States) 2006	Runners-up	2	1	0	1	5	2
(Mexico) 2010	Champions	5	5	0	0	17	0
(United States) 2014	Did not participate						
(United States) 2018	Runners-up	5	4	0	1	24	3
(Mexico) 2022	Runners-up	5	4	0	1	12	1
(United States) 2026	Qualified						
Total	11/12	44	33	1	10	191	33

*Denotes draws include knockout matches decided via penalty shoot-out.

=== CONCACAF W Gold Cup ===
CONCACAF W Gold Cup record
Year	Result	Pld	W	D*	L	GF	GA
(United States) 2024	Semi-finals	5	4	1	0	16	2
Total	1/1	5	4	1	0	16	2

*Denotes draws include knockout matches decided via penalty shoot-out.

=== Pan American Games ===
Pan American Games record
Year	Result	Pld	W	D*	L	GF	GA
(Canada) 1999	Fourth place	6	3	2	1	16	9
(Dominican Republic) 2003	Runners-up	4	2	0	2	8	10
(Brazil) 2007	Third place	6	4	0	2	25	11
(Mexico) 2011	Champions	5	3	2	0	7	3
(Canada) 2015	Fourth place	5	1	0	4	6	9
(Peru) 2019	Withdrew						
(Chile) 2023	Withdrew						
Total	5/7	26	13	4	9	62	42

*Denotes draws include knockout matches decided via penalty shoot-out.

=== Invitational tournaments ===
==== Algarve Cup ====
The Algarve Cup was a global invitational tournament for national teams in women's soccer hosted in Portugal.

(Portugal) Algarve Cup record
Year	Result	Pld	W	D	L	GF	GA
2000	Fifth place	4	2	0	2	6	9
2001	Fourth place	4	2	0	2	9	14
2002	Eight place	4	3	0	1	14	4
2003	Seventh place	4	1	2	1	9	4
2016	Champions	4	3	0	1	4	2
2017	Runners-up	4	2	1	1	3	2
2018	Fifth place	4	3	0	1	7	3
2019	Third place	3	1	2	0	1	0
Total	8/28	31	17	5	9	53	38

==== Arnold Clark Cup ====
The Arnold Clark Cup was a global invitational tournament for national teams in women's soccer hosted in England.

(England) Arnold Clark Cup record
Year	Result	Pld	W	D	L	GF	GA
2022	Third place	3	1	1	1	2	2
Total	1/2	3	1	1	1	2	2

==== Cyprus Women's Cup ====
The Cyprus Women's Cup was a global invitational tournament for national teams in women's soccer hosted in Cyprus.

Cyprus Women's Cup record
Year	Result	Pld	W	D	L	GF	GA
2008	Champions	3	3	0	0	8	3
2009	Runners-up	4	2	1	1	6	5
2010	Champions	4	4	0	0	6	2
2011	Champions	4	4	0	0	6	1
2012	Runners-up	4	3	0	1	8	4
2013	Runners-up	4	3	0	1	5	2
2014	Fifth place	4	3	0	1	8	4
2015	Runners-up	4	3	0	1	4	1
Total	8/14	31	25	1	5	51	22

==== Four Nations Tournament ====
The Four Nations Tournament is a global invitational tournament for national teams in women's soccer hosted in China.

(China) Four Nations Tournament record
Year	Result	Pld	W	D	L	GF	GA
2004	Fourth place	3	0	0	3	2	7
2008	Third place	3	0	2	1	1	5
2011	Runners-up	3	2	0	1	5	4
2013	Runners-up	3	1	1	1	2	3
2015	Champions	3	3	0	0	6	3
Total	5/18	15	6	3	6	16	22

==== Pinatar Cup ====
The Pinatar Cup is a global invitational tournament for national teams in women's soccer hosted in Spain.

(Spain) Pinatar Cup record
Year	Result	Pld	W	D	L	GF	GA
2025	Champions	3	2	1	0	10	1
Total	1/5	3	2	1	0	10	1

==== SheBelieves Cup ====
The SheBelieves Cup is a global invitational tournament for national teams in women's soccer hosted in the United States.

(United States) SheBelieves Cup record
Year	Result	Pld	W	D	L	GF	GA
2021	Third place	3	1	0	2	1	3
2023	Fourth place	3	1	0	2	2	5
2024	Runners-up	2	0	2	0	3	3
2026	Runners-up	3	1	1	1	4	2
Total	4/11	11	3	3	5	10	13

=== Other ===
- International Women's Football Tournament
- 2010 Champions
- 2013 Third Place
- 2015 Runners-up
- Yongchuan International Tournament
- 2019 Third place
- FIFA Series
- 2026 Runners-up

== Head-to-head record ==
Key

Positive balance (more wins than losses)
Neutral balance (as many wins as losses)
Negative balance (more losses than wins)

The following table shows Canada's all-time official international record per opponent:

As of 12 October 2026

Opponent	Pld	W	D	L	GF	GA	GD	% W	Confederation
Argentina	9	7	1	1	17	2	+15	77.78	CONMEBOL
Australia	21	10	3	8	31	25	+6	47.62	AFC
Belgium	1	1	0	0	1	0	+1	100.00	UEFA
Brazil	33	11	10	12	36	47	−11	33.33	CONMEBOL
Cameroon	1	1	0	0	1	0	+1	100.00	CAF
Chile	2	1	0	1	2	2	0	50.00	CONMEBOL
China	28	8	6	14	27	51	−24	28.57	AFC
Chinese Taipei	2	1	0	1	7	2	+5	50.00	AFC
Colombia	4	4	0	0	8	2	+6	100.00	CONMEBOL
Costa Rica	19	19	0	0	62	7	+55	100.00	CONCACAF
Cuba	2	2	0	0	14	0	+14	100.00	CONCACAF
Czech Republic	1	0	1	0	0	0	0	00.00	UEFA
Denmark	8	3	1	4	12	18	−6	37.50	UEFA
Ecuador	1	1	0	0	4	0	+4	100.00	CONMEBOL
El Salvador	1	1	0	0	6	0	+6	100.00	CONCACAF
England	15	7	1	7	20	14	+6	46.67	UEFA
Finland	5	3	1	1	8	6	+2	60.00	UEFA
France	17	6	3	8	13	17	−4	35.29	UEFA
Germany	18	2	1	15	18	47	−29	11.11	UEFA
Ghana	2	1	1	0	5	1	+4	50.00	CAF
Great Britain	2	1	1	0	3	1	+2	100.00	UEFA
Greece	1	1	0	0	7	1	+6	100.00	UEFA
Guatemala	3	3	0	0	26	0	+26	100.00	CONCACAF
Guyana	2	2	0	0	13	0	+13	100.00	CONCACAF
Haiti	5	5	0	0	26	3	+23	100.00	CONCACAF
Hong Kong	1	1	0	0	2	0	+2	100.00	AFC
Hungary	1	1	0	0	1	0	+1	100.00	UEFA
Iceland	3	1	2	0	1	0	+1	33.33	UEFA
Italy	10	6	1	3	14	13	+1	60.00	UEFA
Ivory Coast	1	1	0	0	6	0	+6	100.00	CAF
Jamaica	11	11	0	0	64	2	+62	100.00	CONCACAF
Japan	18	4	4	10	20	30	−10	22.22	AFC
Martinique	1	1	0	0	14	0	+14	100.00	CONCACAF
Mexico	30	24	4	2	73	16	+57	80.00	CONCACAF
Morocco	3	2	0	1	8	1	+7	66.67	CAF
Netherlands	15	9	4	2	23	10	+13	60.00	UEFA
New Zealand	16	11	4	1	30	6	+24	68.75	OFC
Nigeria	6	2	3	1	9	7	+2	33.33	CAF
North Korea	1	1	0	0	2	0	+2	100.00	AFC
Norway	13	2	3	8	11	38	−27	15.38	UEFA
Panama	3	3	0	0	14	0	+14	100.00	CONCACAF
Paraguay	1	1	0	0	4	0	+4	100.00	CONMEBOL
Poland	1	1	0	0	3	0	+3	100.00	UEFA
Portugal	3	2	1	0	9	2	+7	66.67	UEFA
Puerto Rico	1	1	0	0	21	0	+21	100.00	CONCACAF
Republic of Ireland	2	2	0	0	4	2	+2	100.00	UEFA
Russia	5	4	0	1	8	6	+2	80.00	UEFA
Saint Kitts and Nevis	1	1	0	0	11	0	+11	100.00	CONCACAF
Scotland	8	7	0	1	15	3	+12	87.50	UEFA
Singapore	1	1	0	0	8	0	+8	100.00	AFC
South Africa	2	2	0	0	5	1	+4	100.00	CAF
South Korea	11	9	1	1	25	8	+17	81.82	AFC
Spain	4	0	2	2	1	3	−2	0.00	UEFA
Soviet Union	2	1	1	0	6	1	+5	50.00	UEFA
Sweden	24	5	5	14	25	44	−19	20.83	UEFA
Switzerland	6	4	1	1	8	4	+4	66.67	UEFA
Trinidad and Tobago	9	9	0	0	40	0	+40	100.00	CONCACAF
United States	68	4	9	55	44	192	−148	5.88	CONCACAF
Uruguay	1	1	0	0	7	0	+7	100.00	CONMEBOL
Wales	2	2	0	0	7	0	+7	100.00	UEFA
Zambia	1	1	0	0	4	0	+4	100.00	CAF
Zimbabwe	1	1	0	0	3	1	+2	100.00	CAF
Opponent	Pld	W	D	L	GF	GA	GD	% W	Confederation
Total	490	240	75	175	917	636	+281	48.98	–

== FIFA World Ranking ==
View source data.
A line chart depicting the history of Canada's year-end placements in the FIFA World Rankings.

Last update was on March 7, 2026

- Best Ranking
- Worst Ranking
- Biggest Climb
- Biggest Fall

Canada's FIFA World Ranking History
Rank	Year	Best		Worst	
Rank	Year	Rank	Move	Rank	Move
10	2025	7	Steady	10	▼1
6	2024	6	▲2	9	Steady
10	2023	6	Steady	10	▼3
6	2022	6	▲1	7	▼1
6	2021	6	▲2	8	Steady
8	2020	8	Steady	8	Steady
8	2019	5	Steady	8	▼2
5	2018	4	▲1	5	▼1
5	2017	4	▲1	5	▼1
4	2016	4	▲6	10	Steady
11	2015	8	▲1	11	▼3
9	2014	7	Steady	9	▼1
7	2013	7	▲1	8	▼1
7	2012	7	Steady	7	Steady
7	2011	6	▲3	9	▼2
9	2010	9	▲4	13	▼2
12	2009	11	▲1	13	▼2
11	2008	9	Steady	11	▼1
9	2007	9	▲1	10	Steady
11	2006	10	▲1	12	▼1
13	2005	11	Steady	13	▼1
11	2004	11	▲1	12	▼1
11	2003	11	▲2	12	Steady

== Honours ==
=== Major competitions ===
- Olympic Games
  - Gold medallist (1): 2020
  - Bronze medallist (2): 2012, 2016
- CONCACAF Women's Championship
  - (gold) Champions (2): 1998, 2010
  - (silver) Runners-up (6): 1991, 1994, 2002, 2006, 2018, 2022

=== Intercontinental ===
- Pan American Games
  - (gold) Gold medallist (1): 2011
  - (silver) Silver medallist (1): 2003
  - (bronze) Bronze medallist (1): 2007

== See also ==
- Canada men's national soccer team
- Canada women's national under-20 soccer team
- Canada women's national under-17 soccer team
- Canada girls' national under-15 soccer team
- Canada women's national futsal team
- Soccer in Canada
