= John Herdman =

English football manager (born 1975)

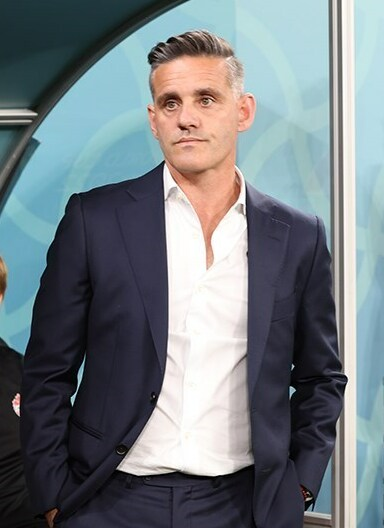
- Herdman managing Canada at the 2022 FIFA World Cup

Personal information
- Date of birth: 19 July 1975 (age 51)
- Place of birth: Consett, England
- Height: 1.70 m (5 ft 7 in)
- Position: Defender

Team information
- Current team: Indonesia (head coach)

Senior career*
Years	Team	Apps	(Gls)
- Hibiscus Coast

Managerial career
- 2004–2006: Southland (NZL) U15
- 2006–2008: New Zealand Women U20
- 2006–2011: New Zealand Women
- 2011–2018: Canada Women
- 2018: Canada under-23 men's
- 2018–2023: Canada
- 2023–2024: Toronto FC
- 2026–: Indonesia
Medal record
Women's football
Representing New Zealand (as manager)
OFC U-20 Women's Championship
Gold medal – first place	2006 Samoa
OFC Women's Championship
Gold medal – first place	2007 Papua New Guinea
Gold medal – first place	2010 New Zealand
Representing Canada (as manager)
Olympic Games
Bronze medal – third place	2012 London	Team
Bronze medal – third place	2016 Rio	Team
Pan American Games
Gold medal – first place	2011 Guadalajara	Team
Men's football
Representing Canada (as manager)
CONCACAF Nations League
Silver medal – second place	2023 United States
Representing Indonesia (as manager)
FIFA ASEAN Cup
Gold medal – first place	2026 Indonesia
FIFA Series
Silver medal – second place	2026 Indonesia
- * Club domestic league appearances and goals

John Herdman (born 19 July 1975) is an English professional football manager who is the head coach of the Indonesia national team and national under-23 team.

Herdman coached the Canada women's national team from 2011 to 2018, guiding them to back-to-back Olympic bronze medals (2012 and 2016) and a quarter-final finish at the 2015 FIFA Women's World Cup. He then transitioned to the men's program, where he led the Canada men's national team to its first World Cup appearance in 36 years in 2022, and oversaw a significant rise in international competitiveness and ranking.

Herdman is credited with reshaping Canada's national team culture. He helped elevate the profile of Canadian soccer at home and abroad, laying foundational groundwork ahead of the country's co-hosting of the 2026 World Cup.

== Personal life ==
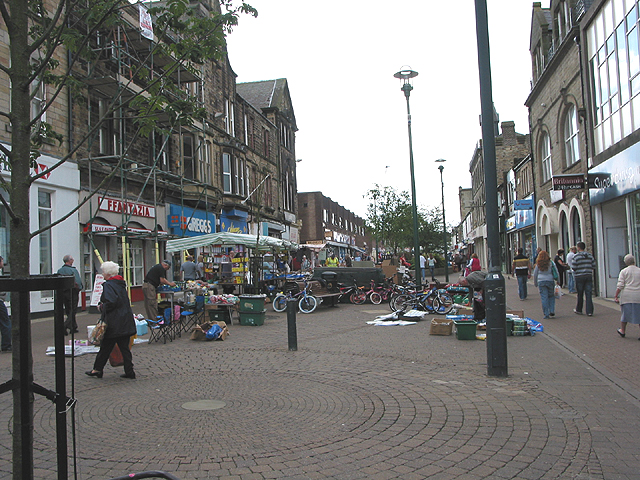
Middle Street, Consett

Herdman is originally from Consett, County Durham, England. Herdman is married to his childhood sweetheart, Clare, and has two children: Lilly and Jay. The latter plays for Bali United, as well as the New Zealand U23 team.

== Playing career ==
During his time in New Zealand, Herdman played for NRFL Division 2 club Hibiscus Coast.

== Managerial career ==
=== Early career ===
Herdman began coaching football at a young age in England, while he was a student and part-time university lecturer at Northumbria University. He was a development coach for Sunderland's youth academy until 2001, when he moved to New Zealand.

=== New Zealand women's national team ===
Herdman arrived in New Zealand and joined the national association football programme in 2003, initially acting as Coach Education Manager and later as the Director of Football Development. Herdman was head coach for the New Zealand women's national team from 2006 to 2011. Working with the national women's teams, he led the under-20 squad to the FIFA World Championship in 2006, the federation's first-ever youth tournament, and the later renamed U-20 World Cup in 2010, securing its first-ever youth World Cup victory. He also guided the senior squad to the FIFA World Cup in 2007 and 2011 as well as the 2008 Summer Olympics in Beijing. For his contributions, he was recognized as New Zealand Football Coach of the Year (2006, 2008) and New Zealand Football Team of the Year (2008).

=== Canada women's national team ===
Herdman took over for the Canada women's national team in 2011 from Carolina Morace after Canada finished last in their 2011 World Cup group. The Canada women's team were in disarray. Some veteran players were contemplating early retirements until Herdman arrived. Shortly after, he led them to a gold medal finish at the 2011 Pan American Games in Mexico. He guided the team through the CONCACAF Olympic qualifying tournament in Vancouver, Canada, securing one of two qualifying spots for the 2012 Olympic Games in London that summer.

==== London 2012 Olympic Games ====
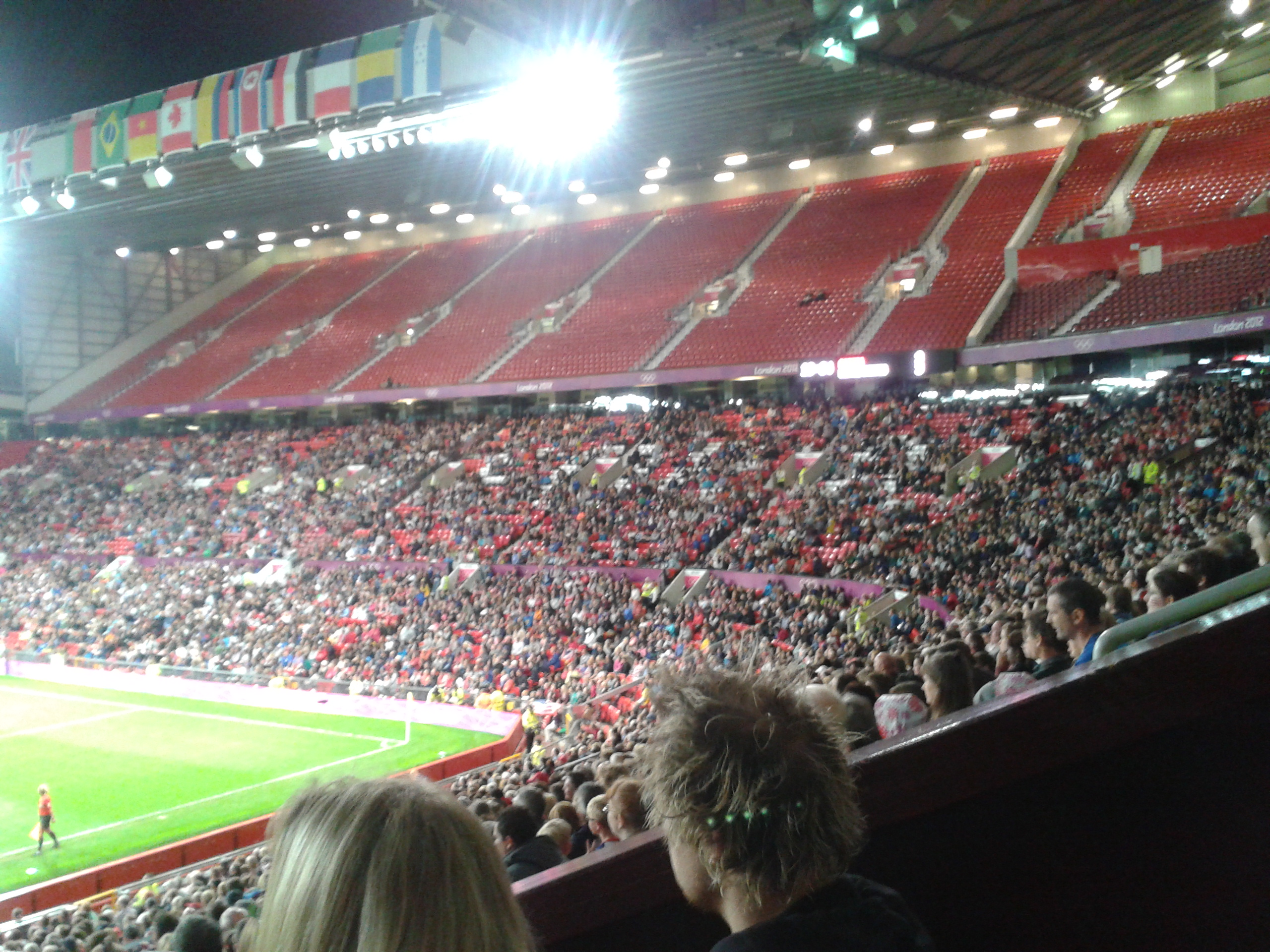
Semi-final match, Canada and the US, Old Trafford stadium, 6 August 2012

The Canadian team advanced from the group stage of the 2012 Olympics with a loss to Japan, a win over South Africa and a draw with Sweden. Canada faced host nation Great Britain in the quarter-final, defeating them 2–0. This led to a historic Olympic semi-final against the United States at Old Trafford that saw the Americans prevail 4–3, with Canada's Christine Sinclair recording a hat-trick. The Guardian referred to the game as "The greatest knockout match in major-tournament football since 1982." Canada then played the third-place game, where they won the bronze medal, Canada's first Summer Olympic team sport medal since 1936. The team received the Canadian Press Team of the Year Award, another first for soccer.

In 2015, Herdman gave a TED Talk, sharing the lessons learned from the team's 2012 Olympic performance.

“If you want to reach greatness, and that's what (the Canadian women's national team) had to buy into, they had to achieve consistent goodness in every part of their life, and not only when people were watching,” he says. “Great people do it when nobody's watching.”

==== 2015 FIFA Women's World Cup ====
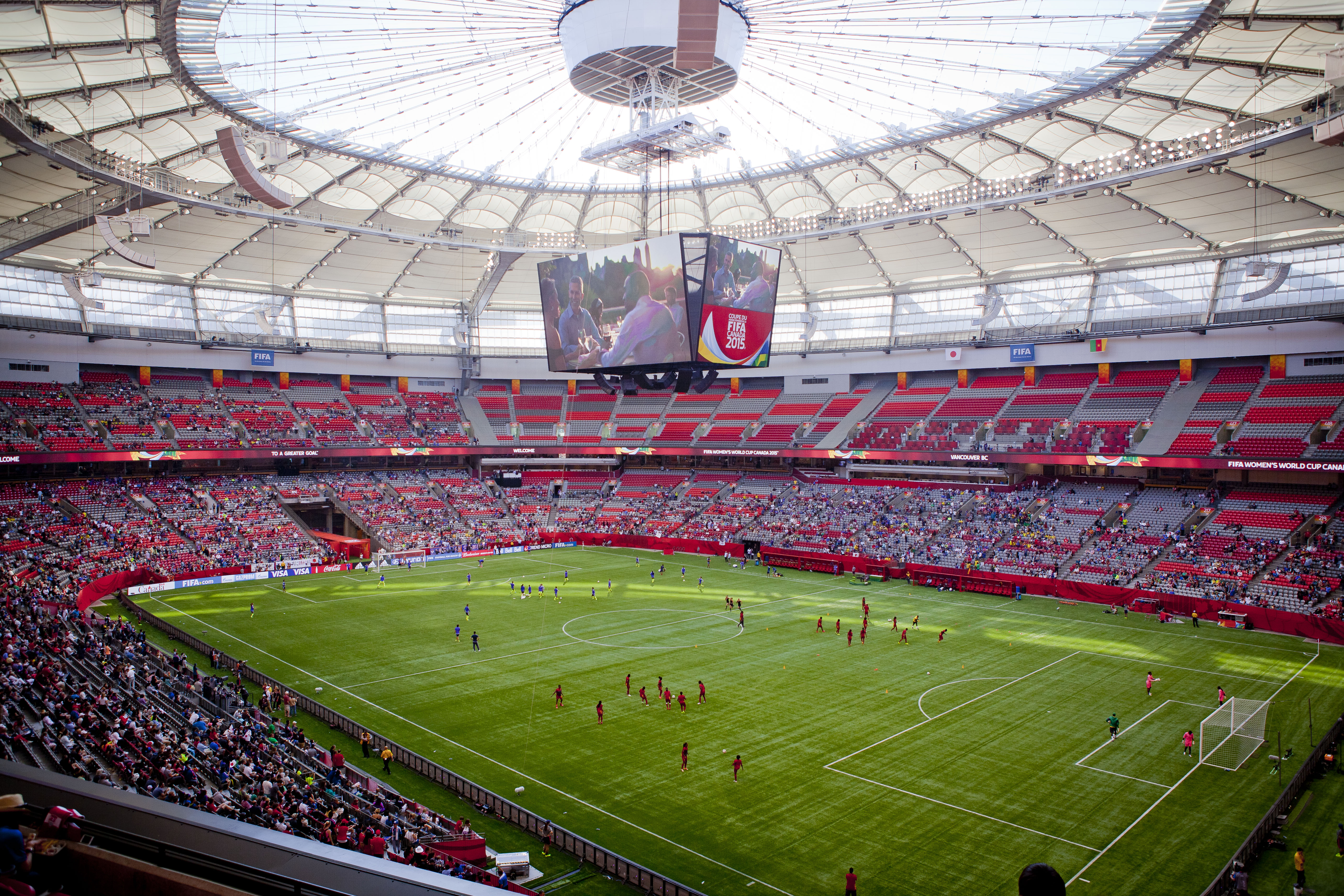
BC Place hosting the 2015 FIFA Women's World Cup

As the 2015 World Cup was played in Canada, the Canadian national team entered the tournament as one of the seeded teams. It was drawn into Group A alongside the Netherlands, China and New Zealand.

Canada came first in their group, recording a win against China (1–0), a draw with New Zealand (0–0), and a draw with the Netherlands (1–1). The squad advanced to the Round of 16, defeating Switzerland 1–0 in Vancouver. In the quarterfinals, Canada faced England and was eliminated following a 2–1 loss in front of a capacity crowd in Vancouver.

==== 2016 Rio Olympic Games ====
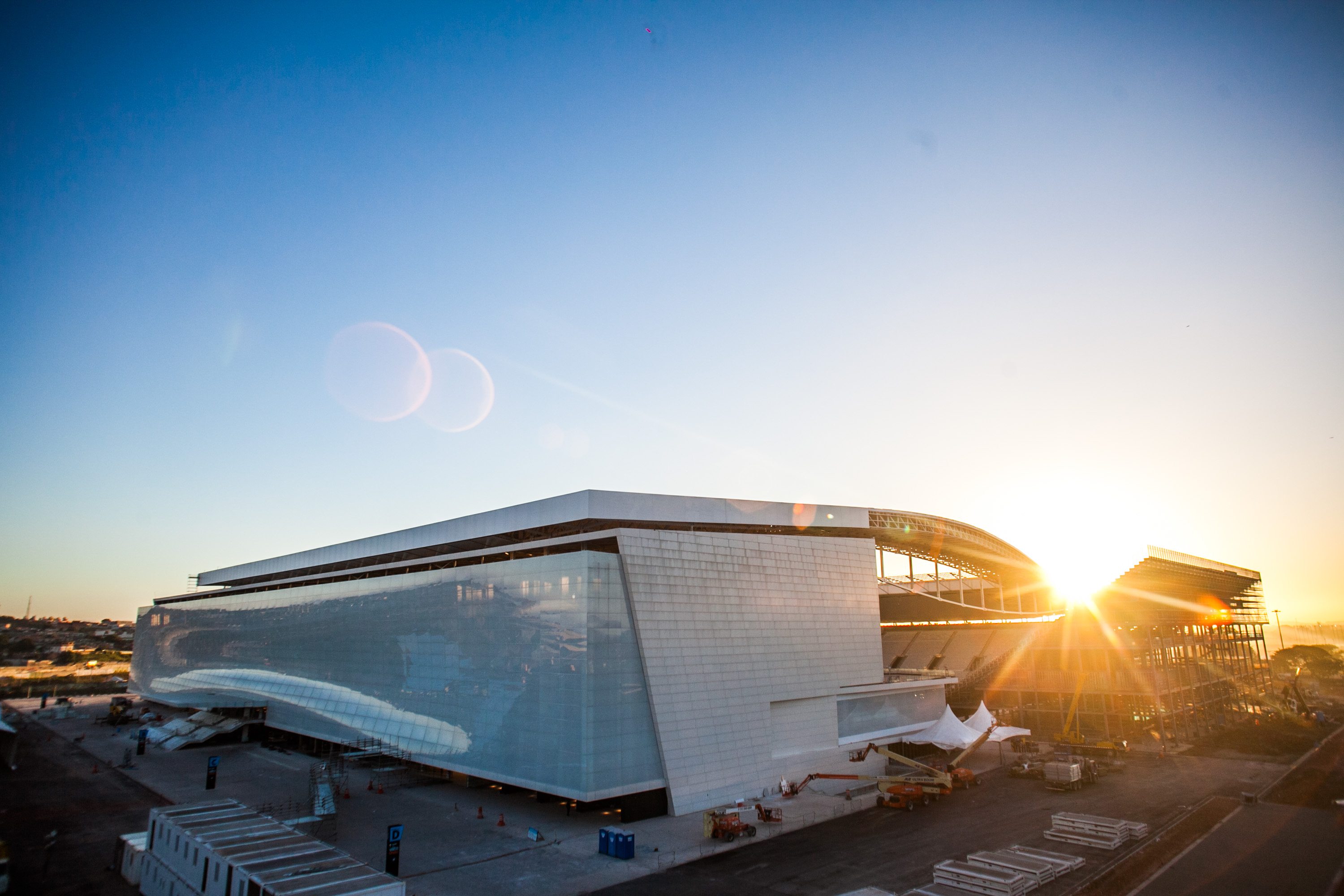
Arena Corinthians, site of the Bronze medal match between Canada and Brazil

Herdman led the team to a second consecutive bronze medal at the 2016 Olympic Games in Rio de Janeiro beating host team Brazil 2–1 in front of 40,000 fans at Arena Corinthians in São Paulo. Canada's win earned the team the distinction of becoming the first Canadian Olympic team to repeat a medal performance at a summer Olympic Games in more than a century.

At the 2016 Olympic Games, Canada entered the record books, scoring the fastest goal in tournament history in the opening match, before becoming the first Canadian team to win the group stage at an Olympic football tournament – winning all three group stage matches.

Under Herdman, Canada earned its highest FIFA world ranking when it rose to fourth place in August 2016 in the wake of its bronze-medal performance at the Rio Olympics and earned the team the honour of "FIFA Most Improved Team".

=== Canada men's national team ===
After the 2016 Olympics, there were concerns that Herdman might take a position coaching the England national women's team. There was a strong feeling that Canada Soccer needed to keep Herdman in Canada, with some seeing him as the most important person in Canadian soccer. On 8 January 2018, Herdman was named head coach of the Canada men's national team, as well as the men's national director. In that position he had responsibility for all age groups from under-14s upward. He was also given an unprecedented contract term, up to the 2026 World Cup.

Herdman inherited a badly divided men's team. There were different camps within the team and fights between players were commonplace. Herdman worked hard to instill a sense of team spirit and unity. Barely a year after taking the job, Herdman stated that Canada would qualify for the 2022 World Cup in Qatar.

In October 2019, Canada hosted the United States in a CONCACAF Nations League match at BMO Field in Toronto. Canada had not defeated its southern rival in nearly 35 years. The starting lineup included two teenagers: 18-year-old Alphonso Davies and 19-year-old Jonathan David. Davies opened the scoring, contributing to a historic 2–0 win for Canada that drew widespread praise for head coach Herdman. Following the match, players highlighted his motivational and tactical leadership. Striker Lucas Cavallini told CBC:

"Every minute of the day, he has a motivational speech. That's why we're here." David added, "This guy knows what he's doing... because he has a tactic every game."

In 2021, he guided the team up the FIFA World Rankings from 72nd to 40th, to earn the team the honour of "Most Improved Side" of the year. On 10 February 2022, the Canada men's team improved to 33rd in the FIFA World Rankings. During that period, Herdman coached Canada to a record 17-game unbeaten streak. In the lead up to the 2022 World Cup, there were reports that Herdman single-handedly secured private donations to fund training camp needs, including his staff.

On 27 March 2022, he led the team to qualify for the 2022 World Cup with a 4–0 victory over Jamaica at BMO Field, its first World Cup in 36 years. He was the first manager to lead both the national women's and men's teams of a nation to qualify for a World Cup.

Throughout Canada's epic rise, players consistently heaped praise on their head coach. During a postmatch TV interview, Milan Borjan snuck up and doused Herdman with champagne.

"He deserved this," said Borjan, his trademark sweatpants paired with a "WE CAN" T-shirt and ski goggles to protect against champagne backsplash. "This guy, he did everything."

==== 2022 FIFA World Cup ====
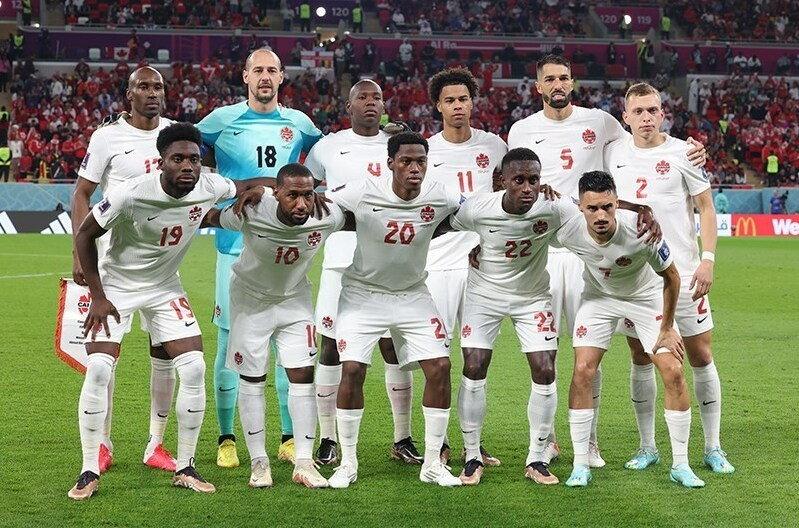
Canada national men's football team, 2022

Despite being placed in a challenging group alongside Belgium, Croatia and Morocco, Canada showed moments of promise, including Davies scoring the country's first-ever goal at a men's World Cup.

Canada's first match of the tournament against Belgium on 23 November ended in a 1–0 loss, despite Canada dictating most of the play, and failing to convert any of their 22 shots, including a penalty. Four days later, Canada lost 4–1 to Croatia, despite scoring first, eliminating Canada from the tournament after two matches. Canada were defeated 2–1 by Morocco in their final group match on 1 December, finishing fourth in the group with zero points.

Off the field, Herdman was recognized for his leadership and emotional intelligence, particularly in managing the late injury of veteran defender Doneil Henry. Twelve days before Canada's opener, Henry suffered a calf injury and voluntarily withdrew from the squad to allow a fully fit player to join. Herdman called it one of the "toughest moments" of his coaching career. He supported Henry's decision to remain with the group in a non-playing role, contributing behind the scenes on tactical preparation and player morale:

I can't make you feel better for what you're going through but you won't feel better at home. And your boys need you here... Make sure you're ready to help the boys.

Following the World Cup, Herdman led Canada to the 2023 CONCACAF Nations League Finals, losing 2–0 to the United States in the final.

=== Toronto FC ===
On 1 October 2023, Herdman left his positions with Canada Soccer to take charge of Toronto FC with MLS. At the time of the announcement, Toronto sat bottom of the Eastern Conference, with three wins from twenty-six games in the 2023 season. Under Herdman, Toronto earned its largest win margin against rivals CF Montreal with a 5–1 result. Toronto FC also defeated the reigning CONCACAF Champions Cup holders, Pachuca, by a 2–1 scoreline in Leagues Cup action at BMO Field in the final group game. Herdman resigned in November 2024.

=== Indonesia national team ===
In December 2025, Herdman signed a two-year contract with an additional two-year option, to coach the Indonesia national team, as well as the national under-23 team, beginning in January 2026.

On 3 January 2026, he was officially introduced as the head coach for both Indonesia senior and under-23 national teams.

On 5 October 2026, Herdman led Indonesia to victory in the inaugural edition of the FIFA ASEAN Cup, securing his first title as Indonesia head coach.

== Legacy in Canada ==
Herdman is widely regarded as a central figure in the transformation of Canadian soccer in the 2010s and early 2020s. During his tenure with both the women's and men's national teams, Herdman focused on motivating his teams, encouraging individual players and emphasizing team unity and spirit, with a belief in the ability to succeed.

In a retrospective on his tenure, the Canadian Olympic Committee noted that "John Herdman defined a decade in Canadian soccer", highlighting his role in bringing Canada back to global competition through "his ability to cultivate belief, resilience, and national pride".

Following Canada's third-place finish at the 2025 CONCACAF Nations League Finals, Thierry Henry credited Herdman with Canada's rise. In post game analysis on CBS Sports, Henry said: "This is not the Canadian Team of ten years ago. You are now favorites. Stop saying to everybody that you are little Canada. That team is good, you should perform. Stop hiding behind the fact you are little Canada – you are not little. And thanks to John Herdman. He put that team together."

Writing in The Athletic, journalist Joshua Kloke said: "Herdman's tactics and motivational methods have left a mark on Canadian soccer's DNA. His leadership laid the groundwork for Canada's return to the World Cup stage, but also helped redefine what's possible for Canadian football going forward."

Herdman has also been instrumental in supporting the development of former female players into coaches and sports executives. Notably, he played a key mentorship role for Diana Matheson, a former Olympian who spearheaded the launch of Canada's first professional women's soccer league, the Northern Super League (NSL). "I'm a big believer in knowing what the end in mind is," Matheson said in an interview ahead of the NSL's opening night. Herdman, her former national team coach, had taught her the value of a specific imagination: "What does it feel like? What does it sound like? What does it look like to other people?"

As Canada prepares to co-host the 2026 FIFA World Cup, Herdman's contributions continue to be referenced in national discussions about the sport's development and cultural growth. Writing in The Globe and Mail, Cathal Kelly said:

No coach in this country’s history has had such a transformative effect on an entire sport. If soccer ever becomes this Canada's main athletic preoccupation – and that's in the process of happening – it will have two eras: before and after John Herdman."

== Managerial statistics ==
As of match played 5 October 2026

Managerial record by team and tenure
Team	Nat.	From	To	Record					Ref.
Team	Nat.	From	To	G	W	D	L	Win %	Ref.
New Zealand Women	(New Zealand)	1 January 2006	31 August 2011	61	16	7	38	26.23	
Canada Women	(Canada)	1 September 2011	8 January 2018	109	62	14	33	56.88	
Canada under-23 men's	(Canada)	9 January 2018	17 July 2018	4	1	2	1	25.00	
Canada	(Canada)	9 January 2018	30 September 2023	58	36	8	14	62.07	
Toronto FC	(Canada)	1 October 2023	29 November 2024	46	16	6	24	34.78	
Indonesia	(Indonesia)	3 January 2026	Present	12	7	3	2	58.33	
Career Total				290	138	40	112	47.59	

^{1} A win or loss by the penalty shoot-out is regarded as the draw in time.

== Honours ==
=== Manager ===
==== Toronto FC ====
- Canadian Championship runners-up: 2024

==== New Zealand U-20 women's ====
- OFC U-20 Women's Championship: 2006

==== New Zealand women's ====
- OFC Women's Championship: 2007, 2010

==== Canada women's ====
- Pan American Games: 2011
- Summer Olympic bronze medalist: 2012, 2016
- Algarve Cup: 2016

==== Canada men's ====
- CONCACAF Nations League runners-up: 2023

==== Indonesia men's ====
- FIFA ASEAN Cup: 2026
- FIFA Series runners-up: 2026

=== Individual ===
- Jack Donohue Canadian Coach of the Year: 2017
- CONCACAF Awards Outstanding Performance Award: 2016
- Canadian Press Team of the Year: 2012, 2022
- Sport NZ Innovation Award: 2011
- New Zealand Football Coach of the Year: 2006, 2008
- New Zealand Football Team of the Year: 2008
- North Harbour Coach of the Year: 2007, 2009
- Honorary Doctor of Sciences from Northumbria University: 2023
