= Neil Turnbull =

Canadian-English football manager

Personal information
- Date of birth: 21 July 1959 (age 67)
- Place of birth: Newcastle upon Tyne, England

Managerial career
- Years: Team
- 1986–1991: Canada Women
- 1996–1999: Canada Women

Neil Turnbull (born 21 July 1959) is an English-Canadian football manager.

== Career ==
Turnbull earned his Canada Soccer "B" coaching licence in 1984, and later his "A" license. He served as the program director of Alberta Soccer, before becoming the first head coach of the Canada women's national team in 1986. He coached the team until 1991, leading Canada at the 1988 FIFA Women's Invitation Tournament and 1991 CONCACAF Women's Championship. He later returned from 1996 to 15 August 1999, coaching the team at the 1998 CONCACAF Women's Championship, which Canada won, and 1999 FIFA Women's World Cup.

== Personal life ==
Turnbull was born and raised in Newcastle upon Tyne, England. He earned a degree in marketing from the Northern Alberta Institute of Technology, and a Bachelor of Education from the University of Alberta in 1985.
