= Canadian Press Team of the Year Award =

Canadian sports award

The Canadian Press Team of the Year Award is an annual award given to Canada's team of the year. The sports writers of the Canadian Press (CP) conduct a poll to determine the nation's top team of either gender.

== Winners ==
Year	Winner	Sport	Coach/Manager	Captain	League/Event
1966	Montreal Canadiens	Ice hockey	Toe Blake	Jean Beliveau	NHL
1967	Toronto Maple Leafs	Ice hockey	Punch Imlach	George Armstrong	NHL
1968	Canadian Olympic Equestrian Team	Equestrian	-	-	1968 Summer Olympics
1969	Ottawa Rough Riders	Canadian football	Frank Clair	-	CFL
1970	Montreal Alouettes	Canadian football	Sam Etcheverry	-	CFL
1971	Montreal Canadiens	Ice hockey	Al MacNeil	Jean Beliveau	NHL
1972	1972 Summit Series Canadian national team	Ice hockey	Harry Sinden	-	1972 Summit Series
1973	Montreal Expos	Baseball	Gene Mauch	-	1973 MLB
1974	Montreal Alouettes	Canadian football	Marv Levy	-	CFL
1975	Edmonton Eskimos	Canadian football	Ray Jauch	-	CFL
1976	1976 Canada Cup Canadian national team	Ice hockey	Scotty Bowman	Bobby Clarke	1976 Canada Cup
1977	Montreal Canadiens	Ice hockey	Scotty Bowman	Yvan Cournoyer	NHL
1978	Montreal Canadiens	Ice hockey	Scotty Bowman	Yvan Cournoyer	NHL
1979	Montreal Expos	Baseball	Dick Williams	-	1979 MLB
1980	Montreal Expos	Baseball	Dick Williams	-	1980 MLB
1981	Montreal Expos	Baseball	Dick Williams	-	1981 MLB
1982	Edmonton Eskimos	Canadian football	Hugh Campbell	-	CFL
1983	Toronto Blue Jays	Baseball	Bobby Cox	-	1983 MLB
1984	Edmonton Oilers	Ice hockey	Glen Sather	Wayne Gretzky	NHL
1985	Toronto Blue Jays	Baseball	Bobby Cox	-	1985 MLB
1986	Montreal Canadiens	Ice Hockey	Jean Perron	Bob Gainey	NHL
1987	1987 Canada Cup Canadian national team	Ice hockey	Mike Keenan	Wayne Gretzky	1987 Canada Cup
1989	Calgary Flames	Ice hockey	Terry Crisp	Lanny McDonald and Jim Peplinski	NHL
1990	Edmonton Oilers	Ice hockey	John Muckler	Mark Messier	NHL
1991	1991 Canada Cup Canadian national team	Ice hockey	Mike Keenan	Wayne Gretzky	1991 Canada Cup
1992	Toronto Blue Jays	Baseball	Cito Gaston	-	1992 MLB
1993	Toronto Blue Jays	Baseball	Cito Gaston	-	1993 MLB
1994	Montreal Expos	Baseball	Felipe Alou	-	1994 MLB
1995	1995 Canadian men's national junior hockey team	Ice hockey	Don Hay	Todd Harvey	1995 World Junior Ice Hockey Championships
1996	Canadian 4 × 100 m relay team	Athletics	-	-	1996 Summer Olympics
1997	1997 Canadian men's national junior hockey team	Ice hockey	Mike Babcock	Brad Larsen	1997 World Junior Ice Hockey Championships
1998	Sandra Schmirler curling rink	Curling	-	Sandra Schmirler	1998 Winter Olympics
1999	1972 Summit Series Canadian national team Team of the Century	Ice hockey	Harry Sinden	-	1972 Summit Series
2000	Daniel Nestor and Sébastien Lareau	Tennis	-	-	2000 Summer Olympics
2001	Jamie Salé and David Pelletier	Figure skating	-	-	
2002	2002 Olympic men's ice hockey team	Ice hockey	Pat Quinn	Mario Lemieux	2002 Winter Olympics
2003	2003 Canadian men's national hockey team	Ice hockey	Andy Murray	Ryan Smyth	2003 World Ice Hockey Championships
2004	Calgary Flames	Ice hockey	Darryl Sutter	Jarome Iginla	NHL
2005	2005 Canadian men's national junior hockey team	Ice hockey	Brent Sutter	Mike Richards	2005 World Junior Ice Hockey Championships
2006	Brad Gushue curling rink	Curling	-	Brad Gushue	2006 Winter Olympics
2007	Saskatchewan Roughriders	Canadian football	Kent Austin	-	CFL
2008	2008 Canadian men's national junior hockey team	Ice hockey	Craig Hartsburg	Karl Alzner	2008 World Junior Ice Hockey Championships
2009	2009 Canadian men's national junior hockey team	Ice hockey	Pat Quinn	Thomas Hickey	2009 World Junior Ice Hockey Championships
2010	2010 Olympic men's ice hockey team	Ice hockey	Mike Babcock	Scott Niedermayer	2010 Winter Olympics
2011	B.C. Lions	Canadian football	Wally Buono	-	CFL
2012	2012 Canadian women's national soccer team	Soccer	John Herdman	Christine Sinclair	2012 Summer Olympics, FIFA
2013	Saskatchewan Roughriders	Canadian football	Corey Chamblin	-	CFL
2014	2014 Olympic men's ice hockey team	Ice hockey	Mike Babcock	Sidney Crosby	2014 Winter Olympics
2015	Toronto Blue Jays	Baseball	John Gibbons	-	2015 MLB
2016	Women's swimming team	Swimming	-	-	2016 Summer Olympics
2017	2017 Canada men's national under-19 basketball team	Basketball	Roy Rana	Lindell Wigginton	2017 FIBA Under-19 Basketball World Cup
2018	Tessa Virtue and Scott Moir	Figure skating	-	-	2018 Winter Olympics
2019	Toronto Raptors	Basketball	Nick Nurse	-	2019 NBA Finals
2020	2020 Canadian men's national junior hockey team	Ice hockey	Dale Hunter	Barrett Hayton	2020 World Junior Ice Hockey Championships
2021	2021 Canadian women's national soccer team	Soccer	Bev Priestman	Christine Sinclair	2020 Summer Olympics
2022	2022 Canadian men's national soccer team	Soccer	John Herdman	Atiba Hutchinson	FIFA World Cup Qualifiers & 2022 FIFA World Cup
2023	2023 Canadian men's basketball team	Basketball	Jordi Fernández	-	2023 FIBA Basketball World Cup
2024	Canadian 4 × 100 m relay team	Athletics	-	-	2024 Summer Olympics
2025	Toronto Blue Jays	Baseball	John Schneider	-	2025 MLB

== See also ==
- Lou Marsh Award
- Lionel Conacher Award
- Bobbie Rosenfeld Award
- Velma Springstead Trophy
