= Yves Sikubwabo =

Canadian long-distance runner

Personal information
- Nickname: Fils
- Born: 17 April 1993 (age 32)

Sport
- Country: Canada
- Sport: Long-distance running

Yves Sikubwabo (born 17 April 1993) is a Canadian long-distance runner.

In 2019, he competed in the senior men's race at the 2019 IAAF World Cross Country Championships held in Aarhus, Denmark. He finished in 91st place.
