= 2021 Women's FA Cup final =

English football cup final

- The match programme cover
- Event: 2020–21 Women's FA Cup
Arsenal	Chelsea
0	3
- Date: 5 December 2021
- Venue: Wembley Stadium, London
- Player of the Match: Sam Kerr
- Referee: Helen Conley (Durham)
- Attendance: 40,942

The 2021 Women's FA Cup final was the 51st final of the Women's FA Cup, England's primary cup competition for women's football teams. The showpiece event was the 27th to be played directly under the auspices of the Football Association (FA) and was named the Vitality Women's FA Cup Final due to sponsorship reasons.

The final was contested between Arsenal and Chelsea on 5 December 2021 at Wembley Stadium in London and broadcast on BBC1. Chelsea won 3–0 in front of a crowd of 40,942 to clinch their third title.

Originally scheduled to be played in May 2021, the match was delayed by the COVID-19 pandemic in the United Kingdom. The alternative date in December was chosen to symbolically coincide with the 100 year anniversary of the FA's infamous ruling to ban women's football from the grounds of all its affiliated clubs.

== Match details ==
5 December 2021
15:00 GMT

Arsenal	0–3	Chelsea
	Report	Kirby 3'; Kerr 57', 77'

Wembley Stadium, London
Attendance: 40,942
Referee: Helen Conley (Durham)

Arsenal	Chelsea

GK	1	(Austria) Manuela Zinsberger
RB	16	(Switzerland) Noelle Maritz
CB	3	(England) Lotte Wubben-Moy		(substituted off) 87'
CB	5	(Scotland) Jen Beattie		(substituted off) 70'
LB	7	(Australia) Stephanie Catley
DM	13	(Switzerland) Lia Wälti		(substituted off) 61'
DM	12	(Norway) Frida Maanum		(substituted off) 80'
AM	10	(Scotland) Kim Little (c)
RW	9	(England) Beth Mead	(yellow card) 8'
LW	15	(Republic of Ireland) Katie McCabe	(yellow card) 66'
CF	11	(Netherlands) Vivianne Miedema
Substitutes:
DF	4	(England) Anna Patten
MF	8	(England) Jordan Nobbs
FW	14	(England) Nikita Parris	(yellow card) 80'	(substituted on) 80'
GK	18	(Australia) Lydia Williams
FW	19	(Australia) Caitlin Foord		(substituted on) 70'
DF	20	(Denmark) Simone Boye Sørensen		(substituted on) 87'
DF	22	(Austria) Viktoria Schnaderbeck
FW	23	(Japan) Mana Iwabuchi		(substituted on) 61'
DF	29	(England) Teyah Goldie
Manager:
(Sweden) Jonas Eidevall

GK	30	(Germany) Ann-Katrin Berger
CB	4	(England) Millie Bright
CB	7	(England) Jess Carter
CB	16	(Sweden) Magdalena Eriksson
RM	22	(Scotland) Erin Cuthbert	(yellow card) 45'
CM	5	(Wales) Sophie Ingle (c)		(substituted off) 90+4'
CM	8	(Germany) Melanie Leupolz		(substituted off) 86'
LM	11	(Norway) Guro Reiten		(substituted off) 87'
RW	17	(Canada) Jessie Fleming
LW	14	(England) Fran Kirby		(substituted off) 74'
FW	20	(Australia) Sam Kerr		(substituted off) 86'
Substitutes:
GK	1	(Sweden) Zećira Mušović
DF	3	(Netherlands) Aniek Nouwen		(substituted on) 90+4'
FW	9	Bethany England		(substituted on) 86'
MF	10	(South Korea) Ji So-yun		(substituted on) 86'
MF	21	(England) Niamh Charles
FW	23	(Denmark) Pernille Harder		(substituted on) 74'
MF	24	(Jamaica) Drew Spence		(substituted on) 87'
DF	25	(Sweden) Jonna Andersson
DF	29	(England) Jorja Fox
Manager:
(England) Emma Hayes

Player of the match
Sam Kerr (Chelsea)

Assistant referees:
Lisa Rashid (Birmingham)
Mel Burgin (Manchester)
Fourth official:
Amy Fearn (Derbyshire)

Match rules

- 90 minutes.
- 30 minutes of extra-time if necessary.
- Penalty shoot-out if scores still level.
- Nine named substitutes.
- Maximum of five substitutions in three stoppages.
