= 2015 Four Nations Tournament (women's football) =

Shenzhen International Tournament

Tournament details
- Host country: China
- City: Shenzhen
- Dates: 11–15 January 2015
- Teams: 4 (from 2 confederations)
- Venue: Bao'an Stadium (in Shenzhen host cities)

Final positions
- Champions: Canada
- Runners-up: South Korea
- Third place: Mexico
- Fourth place: China

Tournament statistics
- Matches played: 6
- Goals scored: 17 (2.83 per match)

The 2015 Four Nations Tournament was the fourteenth edition of the Four Nations Tournament, an invitational women's football tournament held in China. The tournament was won by Canada.

== Participants ==
Team	FIFA Rankings (December 2014)
Canada	9
China (host)	13
South Korea	17
Mexico	25

== Venues ==
Shenzhen	Bao'an Stadium is located in China
Bao'an Stadium	Bao'an Stadium is located in China
22.562175°N 114.086989°E	Bao'an Stadium is located in China
Capacity: 32,500	Bao'an Stadium is located in China

== Final standings ==
Team	Pld	W	D	L	GF	GA	GD	Pts
Canada	3	3	0	0	6	3	+3	9
South Korea	3	2	0	1	6	5	+1	6
Mexico	3	0	1	2	2	4	−2	1
China	3	0	1	2	3	5	−2	1

== Match results ==
11 January 2015
16:00 (local time) UTC+08:00

Canada	2–1	Korea Republic
Beckie 51'; Buchanan 55'	Report	Yeo Min-ji 33'

Bao'an Stadium, Shenzhen
Attendance: 365
11 January 2015
19:00 (local time) UTC+08:00

China	0–0	Mexico
	Report

Bao'an Stadium, Shenzhen

13 January 2015
16:00 (local time) UTC+08:00

Canada	2–1	Mexico
Leon 47'; Sinclair 80'	Reports	Corral 79'

Bao'an Stadium, Shenzhen
Attendance: 532
13 January 2015
19:30 (local time) UTC+08:00

China	2–3	Korea Republic
Li Ying 20'; Tang Jiali 34'	Report	Yoo Young-a 35'; Ji So-yun 62' (pen.); Jeon Ga-eul 69'

Bao'an Stadium, Shenzhen
Attendance: 4,113
Referee: Wang Jia

15 January 2015
19:30 (local time) UTC+08:00

China	1–2	Canada
Gu Yasha 31'	Reports	Sinclair 63', 64'

Bao'an Stadium, Shenzhen
Attendance: 6,683
15 January 2015

South Korea	2–1	Mexico
Jeon Ga-eul 28'; Ji So-yun 59'	Report	Corral 51'

Bao'an Stadium, Shenzhen
