= List of international goals scored by Marta =

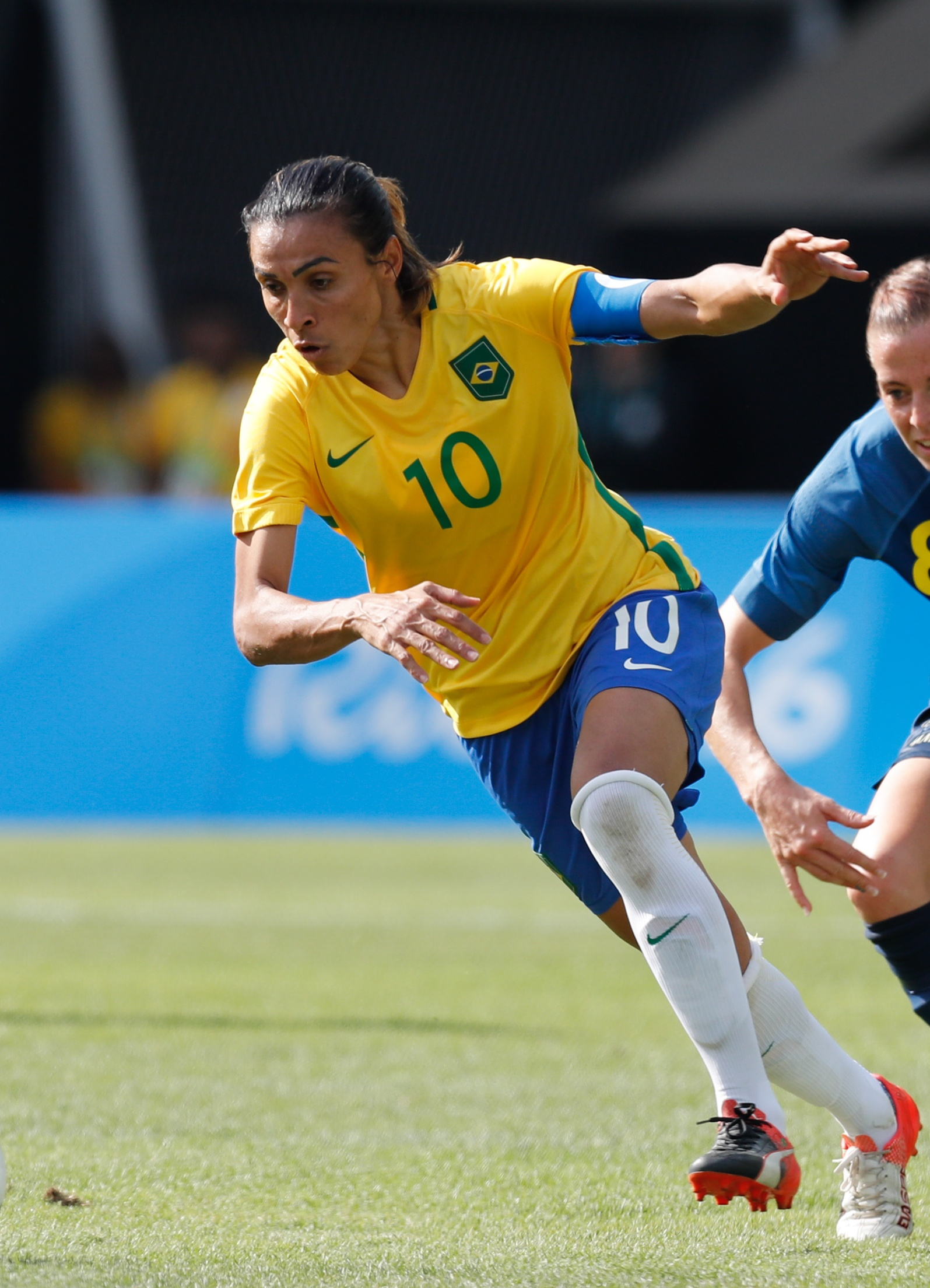
Marta playing for Brazil at the 2016 Summer Olympics

Marta Vieira da Silva, known mononymously as Marta, is a Brazilian footballer who represented Brazil women's national football team as a forward. As of August 2025, she has played for the senior national team in 213 matches and has scored 122 goals, making her Brazil's top goalscorer. She is also ninth in all-time top scorers of women's international football.

== International goals ==
As of 02 August 2025

International goals by date, venue, opponent, score, result and competition
| No. | Date | Venue | Opponent | Score | Result | Competition |
|---|---|---|---|---|---|---|
| 1 | 25 April 2003 | Estadio Monumental, Lima, Peru | Peru | 3–0 | 3–0 | Copa América 2003 |
| 2 | 27 April 2003 | Estadio Monumental, Lima, Peru | Colombia | 4–0 | 12–0 | Copa América 2003 |
| 3 | 27 April 2003 | Estadio Monumental, Lima, Peru | Colombia | 7–0 | 12–0 | Copa América 2003 |
| 4 | 27 April 2003 | Estadio Monumental, Lima, Peru | Colombia | 8–0 | 12–0 | Copa América 2003 |
| 5 | 2 August 2003 | Estadio Panamericano, San Cristóbal, Dominican Republic | Haiti | 1–0 | 5–0 | Pan American Games 2003 |
| 6 | 8 August 2003 | Estadio Panamericano, San Cristóbal, Dominican Republic | Canada | 3–0 | 5–0 | Pan American Games 2003 |
| 7 | 11 August 2003 | Estadio Panamericano, San Cristóbal, Dominican Republic | Argentina | 1–0 | 2–1 | Pan American Games 2003 |
| 8 | 11 August 2003 | Estadio Panamericano, San Cristóbal, Dominican Republic | Argentina | 2–0 | 2–1 | Pan American Games 2003 |
| 9 | 21 September 2003 | RFK Stadium, Washington, D.C., United States | South Korea | 1–0 | 3–0 | FIFA World Cup 2003 |
| 10 | 24 September 2003 | RFK Stadium, Washington, D.C., United States | Norway | 3–1 | 4–1 | FIFA World Cup 2003 |
| 11 | 1 October 2003 | Gillette Stadium, Foxborough, United States | Sweden | 1–1 | 1–2 | FIFA World Cup 2003 |
| 12 | 24 April 2004 | Legion Field, Birmingham, United States | United States | 1–3 | 1–5 | Friendly |
| 13 | 11 August 2004 | Kaftanzoglio Stadium, Thessaloniki, Greece | Australia | 1–0 | 1–0 | Olympics 2004 |
| 14 | 17 August 2004 | Pampeloponnisiako Stadium, Patras, Greece | Greece | 5–0 | 7–0 | Olympics 2004 |
| 15 | 20 August 2004 | Pankritio Stadium, Heraklio, Greece | Mexico | 5–0 | 5–0 | Olympics 2004 |
| 16 | 14 July 2007 | Estádio Olímpico João Havelange, Rio de Janeiro, Brazil | Jamaica | 4–0 | 5–0 | Pan American Games 2007 |
| 17 | 18 July 2007 | Estádio Olímpico João Havelange, Rio de Janeiro, Brazil | Ecuador | 5–0 | 10–0 | Pan American Games 2007 |
| 18 | 18 July 2007 | Estádio Olímpico João Havelange, Rio de Janeiro, Brazil | Ecuador | 7–0 | 10–0 | Pan American Games 2007 |
| 19 | 18 July 2007 | Estádio Olímpico João Havelange, Rio de Janeiro, Brazil | Ecuador | 9–0 | 10–0 | Pan American Games 2007 |
| 20 | 18 July 2007 | Estádio Olímpico João Havelange, Rio de Janeiro, Brazil | Ecuador | 10–0 | 10–0 | Pan American Games 2007 |
| 21 | 20 July 2007 | Maracanã, Rio de Janeiro, Brazil | Canada | 1–0 | 7–0 | Pan American Games 2007 |
| 22 | 20 July 2007 | Maracanã, Rio de Janeiro, Brazil | Canada | 3–0 | 7–0 | Pan American Games 2007 |
| 23 | 20 July 2007 | Maracanã, Rio de Janeiro, Brazil | Canada | 5–0 | 7–0 | Pan American Games 2007 |
| 24 | 20 July 2007 | Maracanã, Rio de Janeiro, Brazil | Canada | 6–0 | 7–0 | Pan American Games 2007 |
| 25 | 20 July 2007 | Maracanã, Rio de Janeiro, Brazil | Canada | 7–0 | 7–0 | Pan American Games 2007 |
| 26 | 26 July 2007 | Maracanã, Rio de Janeiro, Brazil | United States | 1–0 | 5–0 | Pan American Games 2007 |
| 27 | 26 July 2007 | Maracanã, Rio de Janeiro, Brazil | United States | 4–0 | 5–0 | Pan American Games 2007 |
| 28 | 12 September 2007 | Wuhan Sports Centre Stadium, Wuhan, China | New Zealand | 3–0 | 5–0 | FIFA World Cup 2007 |
| 29 | 12 September 2007 | Wuhan Sports Centre Stadium, Wuhan, China | New Zealand | 5–0 | 5–0 | FIFA World Cup 2007 |
| 30 | 15 September 2007 | Wuhan Sports Centre Stadium, Wuhan, China | China | 1–0 | 4–0 | FIFA World Cup 2007 |
| 31 | 15 September 2007 | Wuhan Sports Centre Stadium, Wuhan, China | China | 4–0 | 4–0 | FIFA World Cup 2007 |
| 32 | 23 September 2007 | Tianjin Olympic Center Stadium, Tianjin, China | Australia | 2–0 | 3–2 | FIFA World Cup 2007 |
| 33 | 27 September 2007 | Yellow Dragon Stadium, Hangzhou, China | United States | 2–0 | 4–0 | FIFA World Cup 2007 |
| 34 | 27 September 2007 | Yellow Dragon Stadium, Hangzhou, China | United States | 4–0 | 4–0 | FIFA World Cup 2007 |
| 35 | 19 April 2008 | Workers Stadium, Beijing, China | Ghana | 1–0 | 5–1 | Olympic qualifying 2008 |
| 36 | 9 August 2008 | Shenyang Olympic Stadium, Shenyang, China | North Korea | 1–0 | 2–1 | Olympics 2008 |
| 37 | 15 August 2008 | Tianjin Olympic Center Stadium, Tianjin, China | Norway | 2–0 | 2–1 | Olympics 2008 |
| 38 | 18 August 2008 | Shanghai Stadium, Shanghai, China | Germany | 3–0 | 4–1 | Olympics 2008 |
| 39 | 9 December 2009 | Estádio do Pacaembu, São Paulo, Brazil | Chile | 2–0 | 3–1 | Torneio Internacional 2009 |
| 40 | 13 December 2009 | Estádio do Pacaembu, São Paulo, Brazil | Mexico | 1–0 | 3–2 | Torneio Internacional 2009 |
| 41 | 16 December 2009 | Estádio do Pacaembu, São Paulo, Brazil | China | 1–0 | 3–0 | Torneio Internacional 2009 |
| 42 | 16 December 2009 | Estádio do Pacaembu, São Paulo, Brazil | China | 3–0 | 3–0 | Torneio Internacional 2009 |
| 43 | 20 December 2009 | Estádio do Pacaembu, São Paulo, Brazil | Mexico | 2–1 | 5–2 | Torneio Internacional 2009 |
| 44 | 20 December 2009 | Estádio do Pacaembu, São Paulo, Brazil | Mexico | 4–1 | 5–2 | Torneio Internacional 2009 |
| 45 | 20 December 2009 | Estádio do Pacaembu, São Paulo, Brazil | Mexico | 5–2 | 5–2 | Torneio Internacional 2009 |
| 46 | 24 October 2010 | Nova Granja Comary, Teresópolis, Brazil | Haiti | 3–0 | 7–0 | Friendly |
| 47 | 7 November 2010 | Estadio Federativo Reina del Cisne, Loja, Ecuador | Uruguay | 2–0 | 4–0 | Copa América 2010 |
| 48 | 7 November 2010 | Estadio Federativo Reina del Cisne, Loja, Ecuador | Uruguay | 4–0 | 4–0 | Copa América 2010 |
| 49 | 11 November 2010 | Estadio Alejandro Serrano Aguilar, Cuenca, Ecuador | Colombia | 2–0 | 2–1 | Copa América 2010 |
| 50 | 13 November 2010 | Estadio Alejandro Serrano Aguilar, Cuenca, Ecuador | Paraguay | 3–0 | 3–0 | Copa América 2010 |
| 51 | 17 November 2010 | Estadio La Cocha, Latacunga, Ecuador | Argentina | 3–0 | 4–0 | Copa América 2010 |
| 52 | 19 November 2010 | Estadio La Cocha, Latacunga, Ecuador | Colombia | 3–0 | 5–0 | Copa América 2010 |
| 53 | 19 November 2010 | Estadio La Cocha, Latacunga, Ecuador | Colombia | 5–0 | 5–0 | Copa América 2010 |
| 54 | 21 November 2010 | Estadio Olímpico Atahualpa, Quito, Ecuador | Chile | 2–0 | 3–1 | Copa América 2010 |
| 55 | 21 November 2010 | Estadio Olímpico Atahualpa, Quito, Ecuador | Chile | 3–1 | 3–1 | Copa América 2010 |
| 56 | 9 December 2010 | Estádio do Pacaembu, São Paulo, Brazil | Mexico | 2–0 | 3–0 | Torneio Internacional 2010 |
| 57 | 9 December 2010 | Estádio do Pacaembu, São Paulo, Brazil | Mexico | 3–0 | 3–0 | Torneio Internacional 2010 |
| 58 | 12 December 2010 | Estádio do Pacaembu, São Paulo, Brazil | Netherlands | 1–0 | 3–2 | Torneio Internacional 2010 |
| 59 | 12 December 2010 | Estádio do Pacaembu, São Paulo, Brazil | Netherlands | 2–2 | 3–2 | Torneio Internacional 2010 |
| 60 | 19 December 2010 | Estádio do Pacaembu, São Paulo, Brazil | Canada | 1–1 | 2–2 | Torneio Internacional 2010 |
| 61 | 19 December 2010 | Estádio do Pacaembu, São Paulo, Brazil | Canada | 2–1 | 2–2 | Torneio Internacional 2010 |
| 62 | 14 May 2011 | Estádio Rei Pelé, Maceio, Brazil | Chile | 2–0 | 3–0 | Friendly |
| 63 | 3 July 2011 | Volkswagen Arena, Wolfsburg, Germany | Norway | 1–0 | 3–0 | FIFA World Cup 2011 |
| 64 | 3 July 2011 | Volkswagen Arena, Wolfsburg, Germany | Norway | 3–0 | 3–0 | FIFA World Cup 2011 |
| 65 | 10 July 2011 | Rudolf-Harbig-Stadion, Dresden, Germany | United States | 1–1 | 2–2 | FIFA World Cup 2011 |
| 66 | 10 July 2011 | Rudolf-Harbig-Stadion, Dresden, Germany | United States | 2–1 | 2–2 | FIFA World Cup 2011 |
| 67 | 8 December 2011 | Estádio do Pacaembu, São Paulo, Brazil | Italy | 4–1 | 5–1 | Torneio Internacional 2011 |
| 68 | 25 July 2012 | Millennium Stadium, Cardiff, Wales | Cameroon | 3–0 | 5–0 | Olympics 2012 |
| 69 | 25 July 2012 | Millennium Stadium, Cardiff, Wales | Cameroon | 5–0 | 5–0 | Olympics 2012 |
| 70 | 9 December 2012 | Estádio do Pacaembu, São Paulo, Brazil | Portugal | 3–0 | 4–0 | Torneio Internacional 2012 |
| 71 | 12 December 2013 | Estádio Nacional Mané Garrincha, Brasília, Brazil | Chile | 1–0 | 2–0 | Torneio Internacional 2013 |
| 72 | 15 December 2013 | Estádio Nacional Mané Garrincha, Brasília, Brazil | Scotland | 1–0 | 3–1 | Torneio Internacional 2013 |
| 73 | 22 December 2013 | Estádio Nacional Mané Garrincha, Brasília, Brazil | Chile | 2–0 | 5–0 | Torneio Internacional 2013 |
| 74 | 14 December 2014 | Estádio Nacional Mané Garrincha, Brasília, Brazil | United States | 1–2 | 3–2 | Torneio Internacional 2014 |
| 75 | 14 December 2014 | Estádio Nacional Mané Garrincha, Brasília, Brazil | United States | 2–2 | 3–2 | Torneio Internacional 2014 |
| 76 | 14 December 2014 | Estádio Nacional Mané Garrincha, Brasília, Brazil | United States | 3–2 | 3–2 | Torneio Internacional 2014 |
| 77 | 6 March 2015 | Municipal Stadium, Lagos, Portugal | Sweden | 1–0 | 2–0 | Algarve Cup 2015 |
| 78 | 11 March 2015 | Estádio Municipal, Albufeira, Portugal | Switzerland | 1–0 | 4–1 | Algarve Cup 2015 |
| 79 | 11 March 2015 | Estádio Municipal, Albufeira, Portugal | Switzerland | 3–1 | 4–1 | Algarve Cup 2015 |
| 80 | 9 June 2015 | Olympic Stadium, Montreal, Canada | South Korea | 2–0 | 2–0 | FIFA World Cup 2015 |
| 81 | 1 December 2015 | Arena Pantanal, Cuiabá, Brazil | New Zealand | 4–1 | 5–1 | Friendly |
| 82 | 9 December 2015 | Arena das Dunas, Natal, Brazil | Trinidad and Tobago | 1–0 | 11–0 | Torneio Internacional 2015 |
| 83 | 9 December 2015 | Arena das Dunas, Natal, Brazil | Trinidad and Tobago | 2–0 | 11–0 | Torneio Internacional 2015 |
| 84 | 9 December 2015 | Arena das Dunas, Natal, Brazil | Trinidad and Tobago | 3–0 | 11–0 | Torneio Internacional 2015 |
| 85 | 9 December 2015 | Arena das Dunas, Natal, Brazil | Trinidad and Tobago | 6–0 | 11–0 | Torneio Internacional 2015 |
| 86 | 9 December 2015 | Arena das Dunas, Natal, Brazil | Trinidad and Tobago | 8–0 | 11–0 | Torneio Internacional 2015 |
| 87 | 13 December 2015 | Arena das Dunas, Natal, Brazil | Mexico | 1–0 | 6–0 | Torneio Internacional 2015 |
| 88 | 13 December 2015 | Arena das Dunas, Natal, Brazil | Mexico | 2–0 | 6–0 | Torneio Internacional 2015 |
| 89 | 4 March 2016 | VRS António Sports Complex, Vila Real de Santo António, Portugal | Portugal | 2–0 | 3–1 | Algarve Cup 2016 |
| 90 | 4 June 2016 | BMO Field, Toronto, Canada | Canada | 1–0 | 2–0 | Friendly |
| 91 | 4 June 2016 | BMO Field, Toronto, Canada | Canada | 2–0 | 2–0 | Friendly |
| 92 | 6 August 2016 | Estádio Olímpico João Havelange, Rio de Janeiro, Brazil | Sweden | 3–0 | 5–1 | Olympics 2016 |
| 93 | 6 August 2016 | Estádio Olímpico João Havelange, Rio de Janeiro, Brazil | Sweden | 4–0 | 5–1 | Olympics 2016 |
| 94 | 16 September 2016 | Stade des Alpes, Grenoble, France | France | 1–1 | 1–1 | Friendly |
| 95 | 9 April 2017 | Arena da Amazônia, Manaus, Brazil | Bolivia | 3–0 | 6–0 | Friendly |
| 96 | 13 June 2017 | Laugardalsvöllur, Reykjavík, Iceland | Iceland | 1–0 | 1–0 | Friendly |
| 97 | 19 September 2017 | Newcastle International Sports Centre, Newcastle, Australia | Australia | 2–3 | 2–3 | Friendly |
| 98 | 19 October 2017 | Yongchuan Sports Center, Chongqing, China | Mexico | 1–0 | 3–0 | Yongchuan International Tournament 2017 |
| 99 | 21 October 2017 | Yongchuan Sports Center, Chongqing, China | North Korea | 1–0 | 2–0 | Yongchuan International Tournament 2017 |
| 100 | 21 October 2017 | Yongchuan Sports Center, Chongqing, China | North Korea | 2–0 | 2–0 | Yongchuan International Tournament 2017 |
| 101 | 24 October 2017 | Yongchuan Sports Center, Chongqing, China | China | 1–0 | 2–2 | Yongchuan International Tournament 2017 |
| 102 | 25 November 2017 | Estadio Diaguita, Ovalle, Chile | Chile | 4–0 | 4–0 | Friendly |
| 103 | 11 April 2018 | Estadio Municipal Francisco Sánchez Rumoroso, Coquimbo, Chile | Venezuela | 4–0 | 4–0 | Copa América 2018 |
| 104 | 29 July 2018 | Pratt & Whitney Stadium, East Hartford, United States | Japan | 1–0 | 2–1 | Tournament of Nations 2018 |
| 105 | 5 April 2019 | Estadio Vicente Sanz, Don Benito, Spain | Spain | 1–0 | 1–2 | Friendly |
| 106 | 13 June 2019 | Stade de la Mosson, Montpellier, France | Australia | 1–0 | 2–3 | FIFA World Cup 2019 |
| 107 | 18 June 2019 | Stade du Hainaut, Valenciennes, France | Italy | 1–0 | 1–0 | FIFA World Cup 2019 |
| 108 | 10 March 2020 | Stade de l'Épopée, Calais, France | Canada | 1–0 | 2–2 | Tournoi de France 2020 |
| 109 | 18 February 2021 | Exploria Stadium, Orlando, United States | Argentina | 1–0 | 4–1 | SheBelieves Cup 2021 |
| 110 | 21 July 2021 | Q&A Stadium Miyagi, Rifu, Japan | China | 1–0 | 5–0 | Olympics 2020 |
| 111 | 21 July 2021 | Q&A Stadium Miyagi, Rifu, Japan | China | 3–0 | 5–0 | Olympics 2020 |
| 112 | 24 July 2021 | Q&A Stadium Miyagi, Rifu, Japan | Netherlands | 2–2 | 3–3 | Olympics 2020 |
| 113 | 20 September 2021 | Amigão, Campina Grande, Brazil | Argentina | 2–0 | 4–1 | Friendly |
| 114 | 16 February 2022 | Stade Michel d'Ornano, Caen, France | Netherlands | 1–1 | 1–1 | Tournoi de France 2022 |
| 115 | 19 February 2022 | Stade Michel d'Ornano, Caen, France | France | 1–0 | 1–2 | Tournoi de France 2022 |
| 116 | 6 December 2023 | Estádio do Morumbi, São Paulo, Brazil | Nicaragua | 2–0 | 4–0 | Friendly |
| 117 | 1 June 2024 | Arena Pernambuco, Recife, Brazil | Jamaica | 3–0 | 4–0 | Friendly |
| 118 | 1 June 2024 | Arena Pernambuco, Recife, Brazil | Jamaica | 4–0 | 4–0 | Friendly |
| 119 | 4 June 2024 | Arena Fonte Nova, Salvador, Brazil | Jamaica | 4–0 | 4–0 | Friendly |
| 120 | 29 July 2025 | Estadio Rodrigo Paz Delgado, Quito, Ecuador | Uruguay | 3–0 | 5–1 | Copa América 2025 |
| 121 | 2 August 2025 | Estadio Rodrigo Paz Delgado, Quito, Ecuador | Colombia | 3–3 | 4–4 | Copa América 2025 |
| 122 | 2 August 2025 | Estadio Rodrigo Paz Delgado, Quito, Ecuador | Colombia | 4–3 | 4–4 | Copa América 2025 |

== Statistics ==
As of 02 August 2025

=== Goals by year ===
| Year | Goals |
|---|---|
| 2003 | 11 |
| 2004 | 4 |
| 2005 | 0 |
| 2006 | 0 |
| 2007 | 19 |
| 2008 | 4 |
| 2009 | 7 |
| 2010 | 16 |
| 2011 | 6 |
| 2012 | 3 |
| 2013 | 3 |
| 2014 | 3 |
| 2015 | 12 |
| 2016 | 6 |
| 2017 | 8 |
| 2018 | 2 |
| 2019 | 3 |
| 2020 | 1 |
| 2021 | 5 |
| 2022 | 2 |
| 2023 | 1 |
| 2024 | 3 |
| 2025 | 3 |
| Total | 122 |

=== Goals by competition ===
| Competition | Goals |
|---|---|
| Torneio Internacional | 28 |
| Friendlies | 17 |
| FIFA World Cup | 17 |
| Copa América | 17 |
| Pan American Games | 16 |
| Olympics | 13 |
| Algarve Cup | 4 |
| Yongchuan International Tournament | 4 |
| Tournoi de France | 3 |
| Olympics Qualifiers | 1 |
| Tournament of Nations | 1 |
| SheBelieves Cup | 1 |
| Total | 122 |

=== Goals by opponent ===
| Opponent | Goals |
|---|---|
| Canada | 11 |
| United States | 10 |
| Mexico | 10 |
| Colombia | 8 |
| Chile | 7 |
| China | 7 |
| Argentina | 5 |
| Trinidad and Tobago | 5 |
| Australia | 4 |
| Ecuador | 4 |
| Jamaica | 4 |
| Netherlands | 4 |
| Sweden | 4 |
| Germany | 3 |
| New Zealand | 3 |
| North Korea | 3 |
| Uruguay | 3 |
| Cameroon | 2 |
| France | 2 |
| Haiti | 2 |
| Italy | 2 |
| Norway | 2 |
| Portugal | 2 |
| Switzerland | 2 |
| South Korea | 2 |
| Bolivia | 1 |
| Ghana | 1 |
| Greece | 1 |
| Iceland | 1 |
| Japan | 1 |
| Nicaragua | 1 |
| Paraguay | 1 |
| Peru | 1 |
| Scotland | 1 |
| Spain | 1 |
| Venezuela | 1 |
| Total | 122 |

== See also ==
- List of women's footballers with 100 or more international goals
