= List of international goals scored by Cristiane =

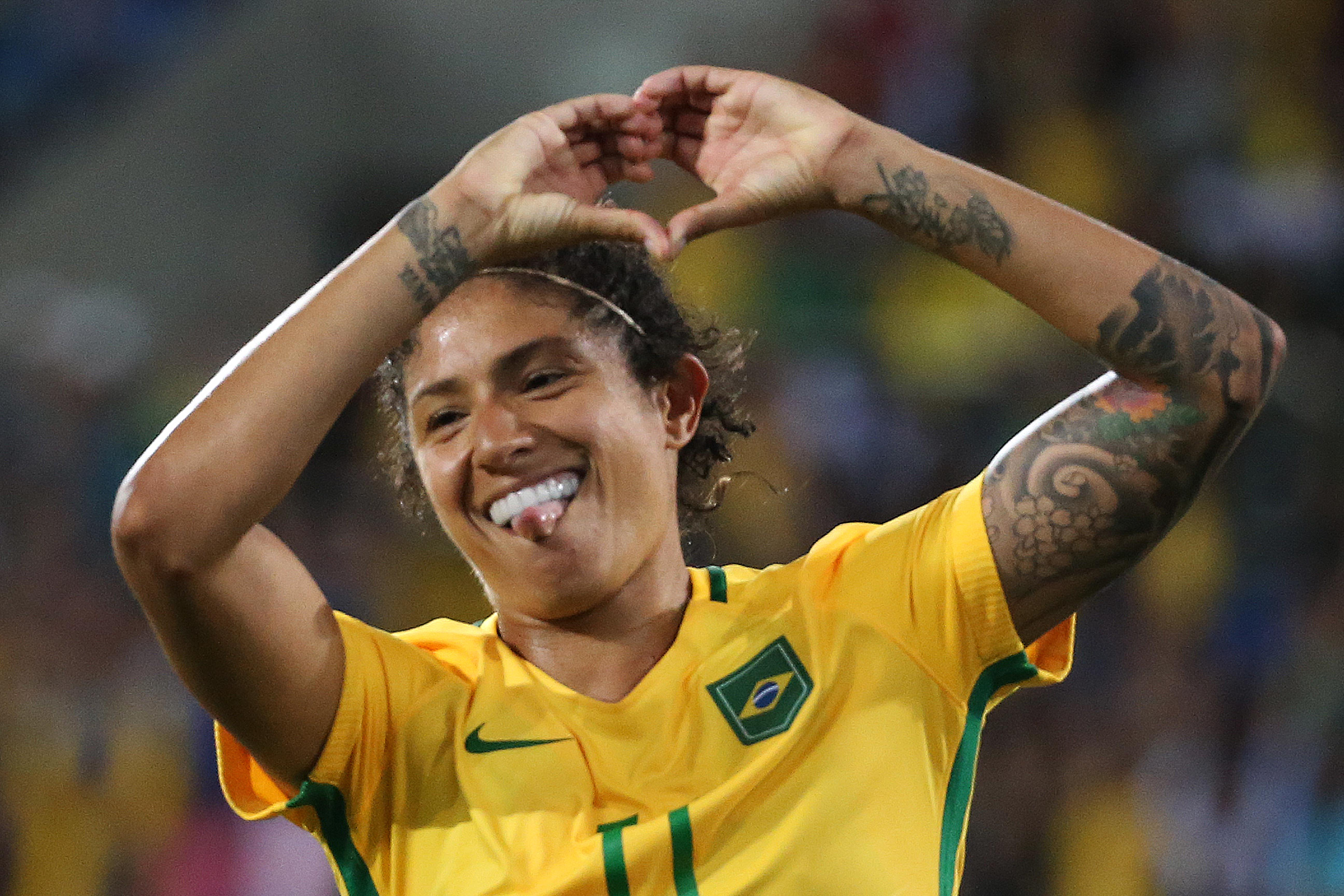
Cristiane playing for Brazil at the 2016 Summer Olympics

Cristiane is a Brazilian footballer who represented Brazil women's national football team as a forward. She has played for the senior national team in 157 matches. With 97 goals, she is the second-best top scorer of Brazil, only behind Marta.

== International goals ==
As of 15 November 2025

International goals by date, venue, opponent, score, result and competition
No.	Date	Location	Opponent	Score	Result	Competition
1	27 April 2003	Lima, Peru	Colombia	10–0	12–0	Copa America 2003
2	20 July 2003	Ottawa, Canada	Haiti	1–0	1–2	Friendly match
3	8 August 2003	San Cristóbal, Dominican Rep.	Canada	2–1	2–1	2003 Pan American Games
4	17 August 2004	Patras, Greece	Greece	2–0	7–0	Olympics 2004
5	17 August 2004	Patras, Greece	Greece	4–0	7–0	Olympics 2004
6	17 August 2004	Patras, Greece	Greece	7–0	7–0	Olympics 2004
7	20 August 2004	Heraklion, Greece	Mexico	1–0	5–0	Olympics 2004
8	20 August 2004	Heraklion, Greece	Mexico	3–0	5–0	Olympics 2004
9	11 November 2006	Mar del Plata, Argentina	Paraguay	1–0	4–1	Copa America 2006
10	11 November 2006	Mar del Plata, Argentina	Paraguay	3–0	4–1	Copa America 2006
11	13 November 2006	Mar del Plata, Argentina	Peru	1–0	2–0	Copa America 2006
12	17 November 2006	Mar del Plata, Argentina	Bolivia	2–0	6–1	Copa America 2006
13	17 November 2006	Mar del Plata, Argentina	Bolivia	4–0	6–1	Copa America 2006
14	17 November 2006	Mar del Plata, Argentina	Bolivia	6–1	6–1	Copa America 2006
15	19 November 2006	Mar del Plata, Argentina	Venezuela	5–0	6–0	Copa America 2006
16	22 November 2006	Mar del Plata, Argentina	Uruguay	5–0	6–0	Copa America 2006
17	24 November 2006	Mar del Plata, Argentina	Paraguay	1–0	6–0	Copa America 2006
18	24 November 2006	Mar del Plata, Argentina	Paraguay	2–0	6–0	Copa America 2006
19	24 November 2006	Mar del Plata, Argentina	Paraguay	4–0	6–0	Copa America 2006
20	24 November 2006	Mar del Plata, Argentina	Paraguay	5–0	6–0	Copa America 2006
21	12 July 2007	Rio de Janeiro, Brazil	Uruguay	2–0	4–0	2007 Pan American Games
22	14 July 2007	Rio de Janeiro, Brazil	Jamaica	5–0	5–0	2007 Pan American Games
23	18 July 2007	Rio de Janeiro, Brazil	Ecuador	1–0	10–0	2007 Pan American Games
24	18 July 2007	Rio de Janeiro, Brazil	Ecuador	3–0	10–0	2007 Pan American Games
25	18 July 2007	Rio de Janeiro, Brazil	Ecuador	4–0	10–0	2007 Pan American Games
26	18 July 2007	Rio de Janeiro, Brazil	Ecuador	6–0	10–0	2007 Pan American Games
27	26 July 2007	Rio de Janeiro, Brazil	United States	2–0	5–0	2007 Pan American Games
28	26 July 2007	Rio de Janeiro, Brazil	United States	3–0	5–0	2007 Pan American Games
29	2 September 2007	Chiba, Japan	Japan	1–0	1–2	Friendly match
30	12 September 2007	Wuhan, China	New Zealand	2–0	5–0	2007 FIFA Women's World Cup
31	15 September 2007	Wuhan, China	China	2–0	4–0	2007 FIFA Women's World Cup
32	15 September 2007	Wuhan, China	China	3–0	4–0	2007 FIFA Women's World Cup
33	23 September 2007	Tianjin, China	Australia	3–2	3–2	2007 FIFA Women's World Cup
34	27 September 2007	Hangzhou, China	United States	3–0	4–0	2007 FIFA Women's World Cup
35	19 April 2008	Beijing, China	Ghana	2–0	5–1	Inter-continental play-off
36	19 April 2008	Beijing, China	Ghana	4–0	5–1	Inter-continental play-off
37	12 August 2008	Beijing, China	Nigeria	1–1	3–1	Olympics 2008
38	12 August 2008	Beijing, China	Nigeria	2–1	3–1	Olympics 2008
39	12 August 2008	Beijing, China	Nigeria	3–1	3–1	Olympics 2008
40	18 September 2008	Shanghai, China	Germany	2–1	4–1	2008 Olympics
41	18 September 2008	Shanghai, China	Germany	4–1	4–1	2008 Olympics
42	25 April 2009	Gothenburg, Sweden	Sweden	1–0	1–3	Friendly match
43	9 December 2009	São Paulo, Brazil	Chile	2–0	3–1	Torneio Internacional 2009
44	9 December 2009	São Paulo, Brazil	Chile	3–1	3–1	Torneio Internacional 2009
45	13 December 2009	São Paulo, Brazil	Mexico	3–1	3–2	Torneio Internacional 2009
46	24 October 2010	Rio de Janeiro, Brazil	Haiti	4–0	7–0	Friendly match
47	24 October 2010	Rio de Janeiro, Brazil	Haiti	5–0	7–0	Friendly match
48	24 October 2010	Rio de Janeiro, Brazil	Haiti	6–0	7–0	Friendly match
49	5 November 2010	Loja, Ecuador	Venezuela	3–0	4–0	Copa America 2010
50	7 November 2010	Loja, Ecuador	Uruguay	1–0	4–0	Copa America 2010
51	7 November 2010	Loja, Ecuador	Uruguay	3–0	4–0	Copa America 2010
52	11 November 2010	Cuenca, Ecuador	Colombia	1–0	2–1	Copa America 2010
53	13 November 2010	Cuenca, Ecuador	Paraguay	1–0	3–0	Copa America 2010
54	13 November 2010	Cuenca, Ecuador	Paraguay	2–0	3–0	Copa America 2010
55	17 November 2010	Latacunga, Ecuador	Argentina	4–0	4–0	Copa America 2010
56	19 November 2010	Latacunga, Ecuador	Colombia	5–0	5–0	Copa America 2010
57	9 December 2010	São Paulo, Brazil	Mexico	1–0	3–0	Torneio Internacional 2010
58	6 July 2011	Frankfurt, Germany	Equatorial Guinea	2–0	3–0	2011 FIFA Women's World Cup
59	6 July 2011	Frankfurt, Germany	Equatorial Guinea	3–0	3–0	2011 FIFA Women's World Cup
60	8 December 2011	São Paulo, Brazil	Italy	3–1	5–1	Torneio Internacional 2011
61	25 July 2012	Cardiff, Wales	Cameroon	4–0	5–0	Olympics 2012
62	28 July 2012	Cardiff, Wales	New Zealand	1–0	1–0	Olympics 2012
63	9 December 2012	São Paulo, Brazil	Portugal	1–0	4–0	Torneio Internacional 2012
64	22 December 2013	Brasília, Brazil	Chile	4–0	5–0	Torneio Internacional 2013
65	10 March 2014	Santiago, Chile	Venezuela	1–0	5–0	Football at the 2014 South American Games
66	10 March 2014	Santiago, Chile	Venezuela	5–0	5–0	Football at the 2014 South American Games
67	16 June 2014	Auckland, New Zealand	New Zealand	1–0	1–1	Friendly match
68	14 September 2014	Loja, Ecuador	Paraguay	2–1	4–1	2014 Copa América Femenina
69	14 September 2014	Loja, Ecuador	Paraguay	3–1	4–1	2014 Copa América Femenina
70	18 September 2014	Loja, Ecuador	Chile	2–0	2–0	2014 Copa América Femenina
71	24 September 2014	Quito, Ecuador	Ecuador	1–0	4–0	2014 Copa América Femenina
72	24 September 2014	Quito, Ecuador	Ecuador	2–0	4–0	2014 Copa América Femenina
73	26 September 2014	Quito, Ecuador	Argentina	1–0	6–0	2014 Copa América Femenina
74	15 July 2015	Toronto, Canada	Ecuador	2–1	7–1	2015 Pan American Games
75	15 July 2015	Toronto, Canada	Ecuador	3–1	7–1	2015 Pan American Games
76	15 July 2015	Toronto, Canada	Ecuador	4–1	7–1	2015 Pan American Games
77	15 July 2015	Toronto, Canada	Ecuador	5–1	7–1	2015 Pan American Games
78	15 July 2015	Toronto, Canada	Ecuador	6–1	7–1	2015 Pan American Games
79	19 July 2015	Toronto, Canada	Canada	2–0	2–0	2015 Pan American Games
80	22 July 2015	Toronto, Canada	Mexico	1–0	4–2	2015 Pan American Games
81	25 October 2015	Orlando, United States	United States	1–1	3–1	Friendly game
82	4 March 2016	Santo António, Portugal	Portugal	1–0	3–1	Algarve Cup 2016
83	9 March 2016	Parchal, Portugal	Canada	1–2	1–2	Algarve Cup 2016
84	4 August 2016	Rio de Janeiro, Brazil	China	3–0	3–0	Olympics 2016
85	6 August 2016	Rio de Janeiro, Brazil	Sweden	2–0	5–1	Olympics 2016
86	9 April 2017	Manaus, Brazil	Bolivia	2–0	6–0	Friendly match
87	5 April 2018	Coquimbo, Chile	Argentina	2–1	3–1	2018 Copa América Femenina
88	7 April 2018	Coquimbo, Chile	Ecuador	1–0	8–0	2018 Copa América Femenina
89	7 April 2018	Coquimbo, Chile	Ecuador	8–0	8–0	2018 Copa América Femenina
90	19 April 2018	La Serena, Chile	Argentina	1–0	3–0	2018 Copa América Femenina
91	9 June 2019	Grenoble, France	Jamaica	1–0	3–0	2019 FIFA Women's World Cup
92	9 June 2019	Grenoble, France	Jamaica	2–0	3–0	2019 FIFA Women's World Cup
93	9 June 2019	Grenoble, France	Jamaica	3–0	3–0	2019 FIFA Women's World Cup
94	13 June 2019	Montpellier, France	Australia	2–0	2–3	2019 FIFA Women's World Cup
95	15 December 2019	Araraquara, Brazil	Mexico	1–0	4–0	Friendly match
96	15 December 2019	Araraquara, Brazil	Mexico	3–0	4–0	Friendly match
97	9 April 2024	Columbus, Ohio, United States	Japan	1–1	1–1	2024 SheBelieves Cup

== Statistics ==
Goals by opponent
Opponent	Goals
Ecuador	13
Paraguay	10
Mexico	7
Argentina	4
Bolivia	4
Chile	4
Haiti	4
Jamaica	4
United States	4
Uruguay	4
Venezuela	4
Canada	3
China	3
Colombia	3
Greece	3
New Zealand	3
Nigeria	3
Australia	2
Equatorial Guinea	2
Germany	2
Ghana	2
Japan	2
Portugal	2
Sweden	2
Cameroon	1
Italy	1
Peru	1
Total	97

Goals by competition
Competition	Goals
Copa América Femenina	31
Olympic Games (including qualifiers)	16
Pan American Games	16
FIFA World Cup finals	11
Friendlies	11
International Women's Football Tournament	7
South American Games	2
Other	2
SheBelieves Cup	1
Total	97

== See also ==
- List of women's footballers with 100 or more international caps
