= Daniela Pardo =

Chilean footballer (born 1988)

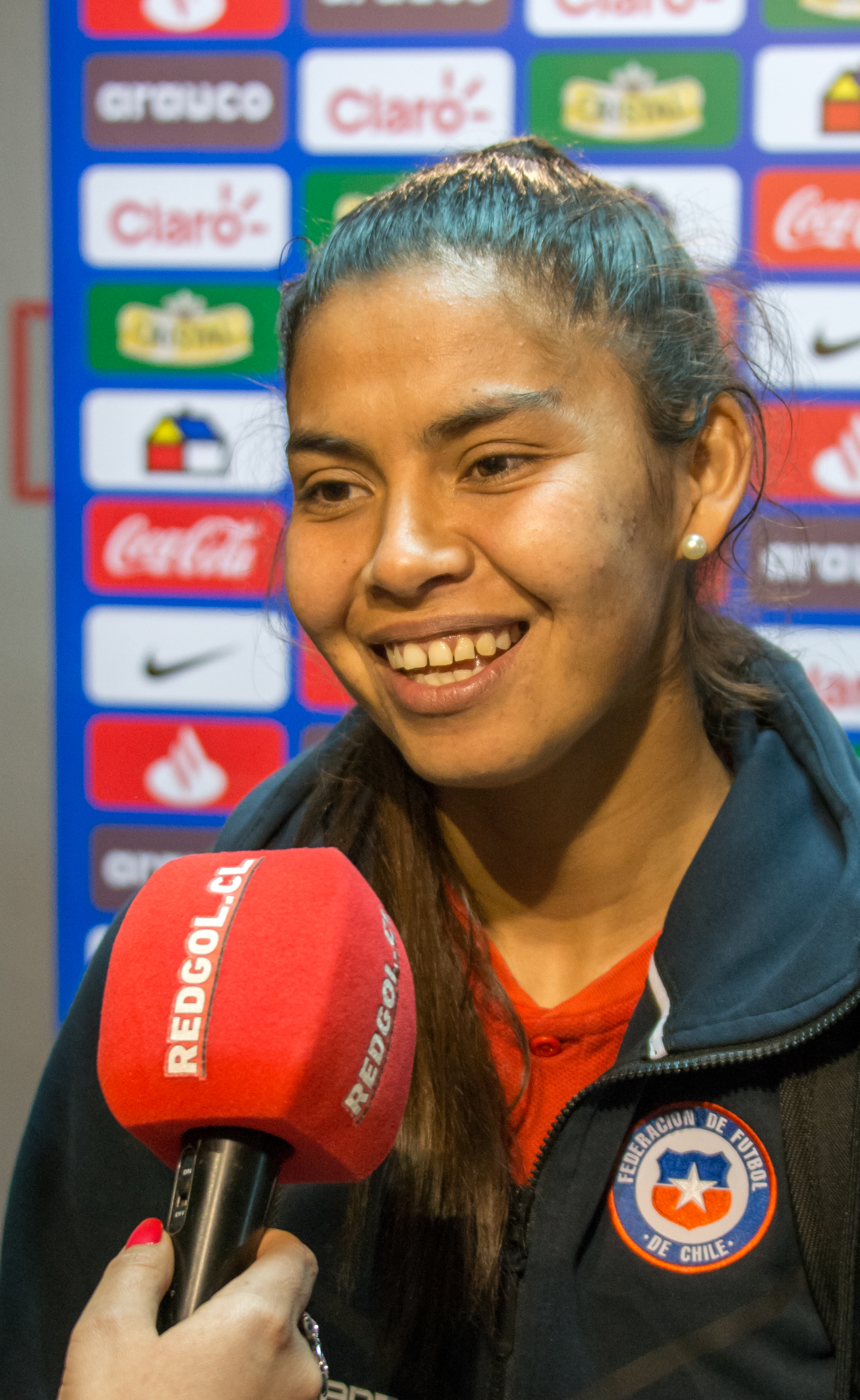
- Pardo with Chile in 2019

Personal information
- Full name: Daniela Andrea Pardo Moreno
- Date of birth: 9 May 1988 (age 38)
- Place of birth: Santiago, Chile
- Height: 1.62 m (5 ft 4 in)
- Position: Midfielder

Team information
- Current team: Palestino (youth) (coach)

Youth career
- Unión Española

Senior career*
Years	Team	Apps	(Gls)
2007	Unión Española		
2008–2009	Unión La Calera		
2010	Everton		
2011	Cobreloa		
2012–2024	Santiago Morning		
2025	Unión Española		

International career
2006–2008	Chile U20	3+	(1+)
2006–2022	Chile	44	(4)
2011–2015	Chile (futsal)		

Managerial career
- 2024: Santiago Morning (youth)
- 2025: Unión Española (youth)
- 2026–: Palestino (youth)
- * Club domestic league appearances and goals

Daniela Andrea Pardo Moreno (Note: In this Spanish name, the first or paternal surname is Pardo and the second or maternal family name is Moreno.) (born 9 May 1988) is a Chilean former footballer who played as a midfielder. She is currently the coach of the Palestino youth ranks.

== Club career ==
Pardo joined Santiago Morning at the age of 22 and left them at the end of the 2024 season.

Her last club was Unión Española in 2025. She announced her retirement in November of the same year.

== International career ==
Moreno represented Chile at two editions of the South American U-20 Women's Championship (2006 and 2008) and the 2008 FIFA U-20 Women's World Cup. She made her senior debut during the 2006 South American Women's Football Championship on 10 November that year.

Pardo also represented the Chile national futsal team in the Copa América de Futsal Femenina in 2011 and 2015.

== Coaching career ==
Pardo served as coach for the Santiago Morning under-16 team in 2024. The next year, she coached the Unión Española under-17 team. In February 2026, she took in charge the Palestino youth team.

== Honours ==
Santiago Morning

- Primera División (3): 2018, 2019, 2020

Chile

- Torneio Internacional de Futebol Feminino: 2019
- Turkish Women's Cup: 2020

Individual

- Premios FutFem - Career Award: 2023
