= 2021 International Women's Football Tournament of Manaus =

2021 Torneio Internacional de Manaus de Futebol Feminino
Torneio Internacional de Manaus International Tournament of Manaus

Tournament details
- Host country: Brazil
- City: Manaus
- Dates: 25 November – 1 December
- Teams: 4 (from 2 confederations)
- Venue: 1 (in 1 host city)

Final positions
- Champions: Brazil (8th title)
- Runners-up: Chile
- Third place: Venezuela
- Fourth place: India

Tournament statistics
- Matches played: 6
- Goals scored: 21 (3.5 per match)
- Top scorer: (Brazil) Kerolin (4 goals)

The 2021 Torneio Internacional de Manaus de Futebol Feminino (also known as the 2021 International Tournament of Manaus) was the tenth edition of the Torneio Internacional de Futebol Feminino, an invitational women's football tournament held every December in Brazil. The tournament ran in between 25 November–1 December, 2021.

== Format ==
The four teams played each other within the group in a single round. The team with the most points earned in the group, was declared as the winner.

== Venues ==
All matches took place at Arena da Amazônia in Manaus.

== Squads ==
- Brazil
- Chile
- Venezuela
- India

== Standings ==
Team	Pld	W	D	L	GF	GA	GD	Pts
Brazil (C, H)	3	3	0	0	12	2	+10	9
Chile	3	2	0	1	4	2	+2	6
Venezuela	3	1	0	2	3	6	−3	3
India	3	0	0	3	2	11	−9	0

Source: Soccerway
(C) Champions; (H) Hosts

== Results ==
All times are local (UTC−04:00)

25 November 2021
18:00

Chile	1–0	Venezuela
Aedo 66'	Report

Arena da Amazônia, Manaus
Referee: Edina Alves Batista (Brazil)
25 November 2021
21:00

Brazil	6–1	India
Debinha 1'; Gio 37'; Ary Borges 52', 81'; Kerolin 54'; Geyse 76'	Report	Kalyan 8'

Arena da Amazônia, Manaus
Referee: Daiane Caroline Muniz (Brazil)

28 November 2021
17:00

India	0–3	Chile
	Report	Urrutia 13'; Hernández 84'; Araya 85'

Arena da Amazônia, Manaus
Referee: Rejane Caetano da Silva (Brazil)
28 November 2021
20:00

Brazil	4–1	Venezuela
Kerolin 20', 40'; Gabi Nunes 25'; Debinha 45+1'	Report	Villamizar 3'

Arena da Amazônia, Manaus
Referee: Charly Wendy Straub Deretti (Brazil)

1 December 2021
17:00

Venezuela	2–1	India
Speckmaier 50'; Olivieri 81'	Report	Dangmei 18'

Arena da Amazônia, Manaus
Referee: Thayslane de Melo Costa (Brazil)
1 December 2021
20:00

Brazil	2–0	Chile
Kerolin 50'; Gio 84'	Report

Arena da Amazônia, Manaus
Referee: Edina Alves Batista (Brazil)

== Goalscorers ==
There were 21 goals scored in 6 matches, for an average of 3.5 goals per match.

4 goals

- (Brazil) Kerolin

2 goals

- (Brazil) Ary Borges
- (Brazil) Debinha
- (Brazil) Gio

1 goal

- (Brazil) Gabi Nunes
- (Brazil) Geyse
- (Chile) Yanara Aedo
- (Chile) Karen Araya
- (Chile) Isidora Hernández
- (Chile) María José Urrutia
- (India) Grace Dangmei
- (India) Manisha Kalyan
- (Venezuela) Bárbara Olivieri
- (Venezuela) Mariana Speckmaier
- (Venezuela) Paola Villamizar
