= Gabi Zanotti =

Brazilian footballer (born 1985)

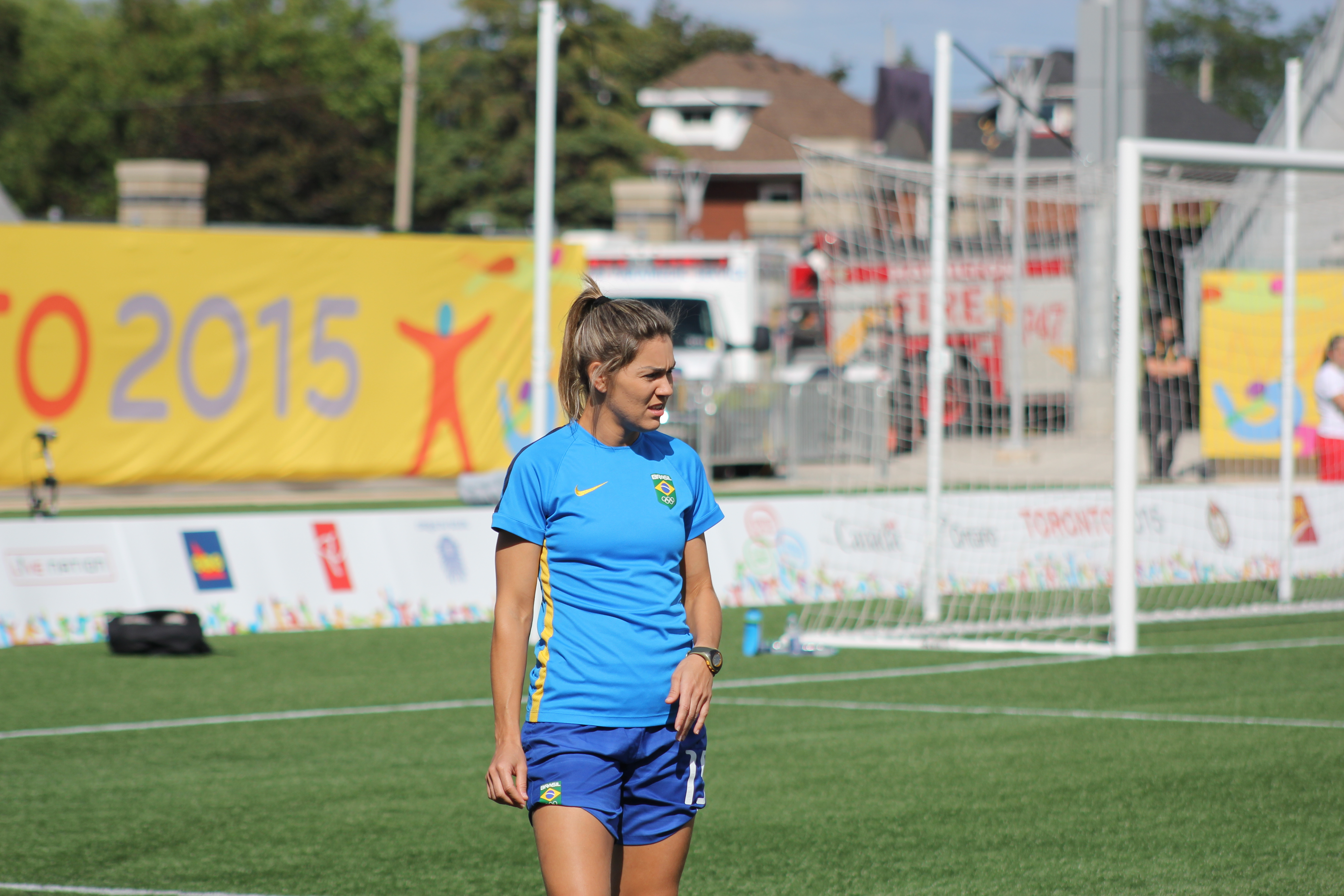
- Zanoti 2015

Personal information
- Full name: Gabriela Maria Zanotti Demoner
- Date of birth: 28 February 1985 (age 41)
- Place of birth: Itaguaçu, Brazil
- Height: 1.71 m (5 ft 7 in)
- Position: Midfielder

Team information
- Current team: Corinthians
- Number: 10

Youth career
- 2006–2009: Franklin Pierce Ravens

Senior career*
Years	Team	Apps	(Gls)
2004–2006	Kindermann		
2008	Boston Renegades	8	(1)
2010	Hudson Valley Quickstrike Lady Blues		
2011	Santos		
2012–2013	Centro Olímpico	14	(12)
2014	Kindermann	0	(0)
2014	Centro Olímpico		
2015	Santos	6	(7)
2016	Dalian Quanjian	0	(0)
2017	Jiangsu Suning		
2018–	Corinthians	259	(91)

International career^{‡}
2009–	Brazil	33	(6)
Medal record
Women's football
Representing Brazil
Pan American Games
Gold medal – first place	2015 Toronto	Team
- * Club domestic league appearances and goals as of 12 April 2026 ‡ National team caps and goals as of 12:17, 12 April 2026 (UTC)

Gabriela Maria "Gabi" Zanotti Demoner (born 28 February 1985) is a Brazilian professional footballer who plays as a midfielder for Corinthians and the Brazil women's national team. She participated at the 2015 FIFA Women's World Cup.

== Club career ==
Between the ages of nine and 14, Gabi played alongside her mother Nailza in a women's football team which competed at regional level. Between 2004 and 2006 she played for Kindermann, based in Santa Catarina. Gabi then played college soccer in the United States while attending Franklin Pierce University. She spent the 2010 season playing in the North American W-League for Hudson Valley Quickstrike Lady Blues. In 2008 she was with Boston Renegades, playing eight times and scoring one goal.

In 2011 Gabi played for Santos, but in early 2012 Santos' board of directors closed the club women's section. Gabi accompanied Maurine, Érika and several other displaced Santos players in transferring to Centro Olímpico.

On 4 April 2026, She became the all-time appearance maker for Corinthians, reaching 259 matches and surpassing the previous record holder Grazi (258 appearances). The milestone came during a 5–1 victory over Red Bull Bragantino in the Brasileirão Feminino at the Fazendinha.

== International career ==
In July 2013 Gabi represented Brazil at the 2013 Summer Universiade in Kazan, Russia. She had already debuted for the senior national team, as a substitute in a 5–2 win over Mexico at the 2009 Torneio Internacional Cidade de São Paulo de Futebol Feminino.

Gabi was not included in the final squad for the 2011 FIFA Women's World Cup in Germany because she was not cleared by the Brazilian Football Confederation's (CBF) medical department.

She was named as an alternate for the Brazil squad at the 2012 London Olympics. In early 2015 Gabi was included in an 18-month residency programme intended to prepare Brazil's national team for the 2015 FIFA Women's World Cup in Canada and the 2016 Rio Olympics. At the World Cup, Gabi appeared in just one of Brazil's four matches, as part of a much-changed team in the 1–0 final group game win over Costa Rica.

After Brazil's 1–0 second round defeat by Australia, Gabi remained in Canada as part of the gold medal-winning Brazilian selection at the 2015 Pan American Games in Toronto.

=== International goals ===
No.	Date	Venue	Opponent	Score	Result	Competition
1.	12 December 2010	São Paulo, Brazil	Netherlands	3–2	3–2	Torneio Internacional 2010
2.	24 March 2012	Boston, United States	Canada	1–2	1–2	Friendly
3.	7 December 2016	Manaus, Brazil	Costa Rica	3–0	6–0	Torneio Internacional 2016
4.	7 December 2016	Manaus, Brazil	Costa Rica	4–0	6–0	Torneio Internacional 2016
5.	14 December 2016	Manaus, Brazil	Italy	2–1	5–3	Torneio Internacional 2016
6.	2 December 2025	Aveiro, Portugal	Portugal	1–0	5–0	Friendly
