= 2019 International Women's Football Tournament of City of São Paulo =

2019 Torneio Internacional de Futebol Feminino
Torneio Uber Internacional de Futebol Feminino

Tournament details
- Host country: Brazil
- City: São Paulo
- Dates: 30 August–1 September
- Teams: 4
- Venue(s): 1 (in 1 host city)

Final positions
- Champions: Chile (1st title)
- Runners-up: Brazil
- Third place: Costa Rica
- Fourth place: Argentina

Tournament statistics
- Matches played: 4
- Goals scored: 10 (2.5 per match)

The 2019 Torneio Internacional de Futebol Feminino (officially the 2019 Torneio Uber Internacional de Futebol Feminino for sponsorship reasons) was the ninth edition of the Torneio Internacional de Futebol Feminino, an invitational women's football tournament held in Brazil.

== Venues ==
All matches took place at Pacaembu Stadium in São Paulo.

== Squads ==
- Brazil
- Costa Rica
- Argentina
- Chile

== Matches ==
All times are local (UTC-3).

=== Bracket ===
Semi-finals
30 August - São Paulo
Costa Rica	0
Chile	1
30 August - São Paulo
Brazil	5
Argentina	0

Final
1 September - São Paulo
Chile (p)	0 (5)
Brazil	0 (4)
Third-place playoff
1 September - São Paulo
Costa Rica	3
Argentina	1

== Final ==
1 September 2019
13:00 (BRT)

Brazil	0–0	Chile
	Report
Penalties
Raquel (penalty missed); Mônica (penalty scored); Chú (penalty scored); Bia Zaneratto (penalty scored); Luana (penalty missed); Bruna Benites (penalty missed); Fabiana (penalty scored); Joyce (penalty missed)	4–5	(penalty scored) Lara; (penalty scored) Balmaceda; (penalty scored) Hidalgo; (penalty missed) Pardo; (penalty missed) Endler; (penalty missed) Roa; (penalty scored) Aedo; (penalty scored) Toro

Pacaembu, São Paulo
Attendance: 16,812
Referee: Deborah Cecília Cruz Correia (Brazil)

== Final results ==
2019 Torneio Internacional de Futebol Feminino Champions
(Chile)
Chile
First title

== Goalscorers ==
There were 10 goals scored in 4 matches, for an average of 2.5 goals per match.

2 goals

- (Costa Rica) Priscila Chinchilla

1 goal

- (Argentina) Sole Jaimes
- (Costa Rica) Melissa Herrera
