= Raquel Fernandes =

Brazilian footballer

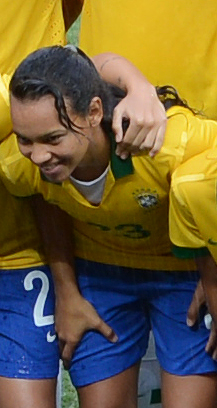
- At the 2013 Torneio Internacional de Brasília

Personal information
- Full name: Raquel Fernandes dos Santos
- Date of birth: 21 March 1991 (age 35)
- Place of birth: Contagem, Minas Gerais
- Height: 1.60 m (5 ft 3 in)
- Position: Forward

Team information
- Current team: Grêmio
- Number: 30

Senior career*
Years	Team	Apps	(Gls)
- Atlético Mineiro
2010–2015	Ferroviária	12+	(17+)
2015	Botafogo-PB	6	(1)
2016	Ferroviária		
2016	Changchun Zhuoyue		
2017	Ferroviária	15	(9)
2017	Corinthians	0	(0)
2018	Ferroviária	15	(6)
2018	→ Iranduba (loan)	0	(0)
2019	Sporting Huelva	15	(2)
2019–2021	Sporting CP	38	(33)
2021	Ferroviária	11	(0)
2022	Famalicão	18	(8)
2023–	Grêmio		

International career^{‡}
2013–	Brazil	52	(8)
Medal record
Women's football
Representing Brazil
Pan American Games
Gold medal – first place	2015 Toronto	Team
- * Club domestic league appearances and goals as of 17 Feb 2023 ‡ National team caps and goals as of 17 Feb 2023

Raquel Fernandes dos Santos (born 21 March 1991), commonly known as Raquel, is a Brazilian footballer who plays as a forward for Grêmio in the Portuguese Campeonato Nacional and the Brazil national team. She participated in the 2015 and 2019 FIFA Women's World Cup.

== Club career ==
Raquel joined Ferroviária in 2010. In the 2013 Campeonato Paulista de Futebol Feminino, she scored six goals in her team's 19–0 win over Botucatu.

In January 2016 Raquel joined compatriots Darlene de Souza and Rafaelle Souza in transferring to Chinese Women's Super League club Changchun Zhuoyue.

Raquel played in the Spanish Primera División for Sporting de Huelva in 2018 and 2019.

On 26 July 2019, Raquel signed with Sporting CP in Portugal.

== International career ==
Raquel represented Brazil's youth team at the inaugural 2008 FIFA U-17 Women's World Cup in New Zealand. She was called up to the senior Brazil national team for the first time in August 2013 after showing impressive form for her club Ferroviária.

In February 2015 Raquel was included in an 18-month residency programme intended to prepare Brazil's national team for the 2015 FIFA Women's World Cup in Canada and the 2016 Rio Olympics. At the World Cup, Raquel appeared in each of Brazil's four matches, scoring in the 1–0 final group game win over Costa Rica. After Brazil's 1–0 second round defeat by Australia, Raquel remained in Canada as part of the Brazilian selection for the 2015 Pan American Games in Toronto.

=== International goals ===
Goal	Date	Location	Opponent	#	Score	Result	Competition
1	2014-09-24	Quito, Ecuador	Ecuador	1.1	4–0	4–0	2014 Copa América Femenina
2	2014-09-26	Sangolquí, Ecuador	Argentina	1.1	6–0	6–0	2014 Copa América Femenina
3	2014-12-10	Brasília, Brazil	Argentina	1.1	3–0	4–0	Torneio Internacional 2014
4	2015-06-17	Moncton, Canada	Costa Rica	1.1	1–0	1–0	2015 FIFA Women's World Cup
5	2015-07-11	Toronto, Canada	Costa Rica	1.1	1–0	3–0	2015 Pan American Games
6	2015-12-10	Natal, Brazil	Trinidad and Tobago	1.1	10–0	11–0	Torneio Internacional Natal 2015
7	2016-03-04	Santo António, Portugal	Portugal	1.1	3–1	3–1	Algarve Cup 2016
8	2016-07-23	Fortaleza, Brazil	Australia	1.1	2–1	3–1	Friendly game
