= Darlene de Souza =

Brazilian footballer (born 1990)

Darlene
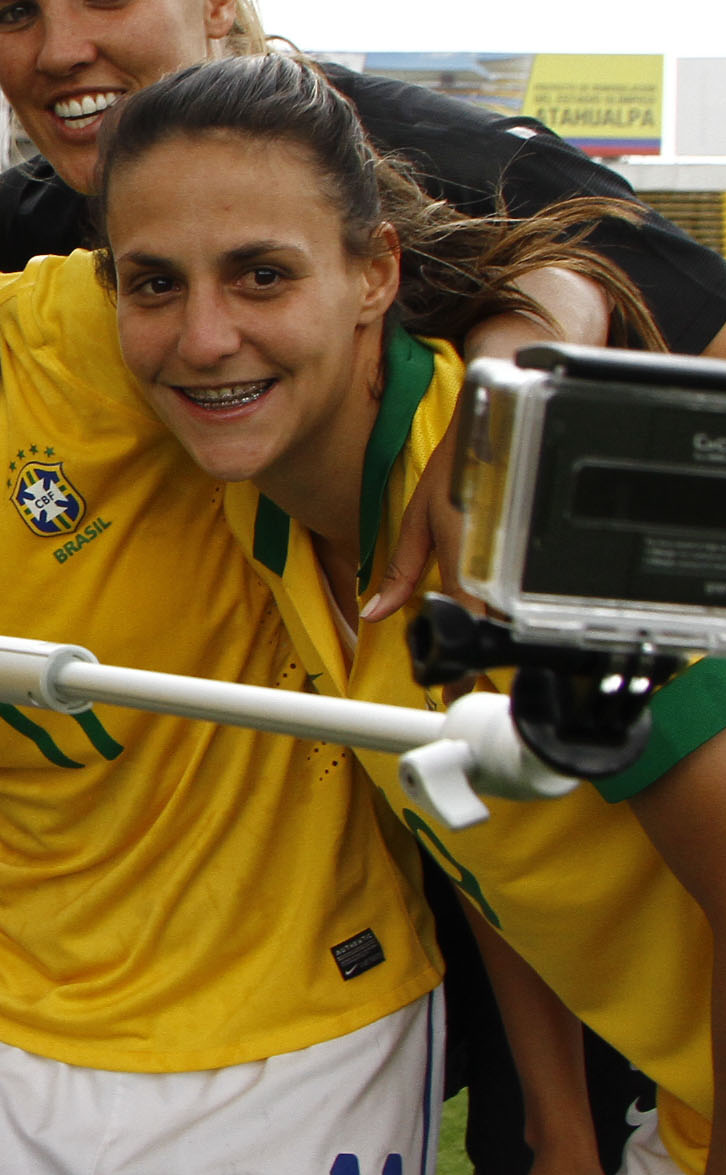
- With selfie stick at the 2014 Copa América Femenina

Personal information
- Full name: Darlene de Souza Reguera
- Date of birth: 11 January 1990 (age 36)
- Place of birth: São José do Rio Preto, São Paulo, Brazil
- Height: 1.72 m (5 ft 8 in)
- Position: Midfielder

Senior career*
Years	Team	Apps	(Gls)
2012	SV Neulengbach		
2012–2013	Spratzern		
2013–2014	Rio Preto	11	(11)
2014	Centro Olímpico	9	(8)
2015	Rio Preto	10	(5)
2016	Changchun Zhuoyue		
2017	Rio Preto	17	(12)
2017–2018	Zaragoza CFF	9	(4)
2018–2021	Benfica	45	(105)
2021–2024	Flamengo	27	(6)
2024–2025	Ferooviária	0	(0)
2025	São Paulo	0	(0)

International career^{‡}
2013–2019	Brazil	28	(7)
Medal record
Women's football
Representing Brazil
Copa América Femenina
Gold medal – first place	2014 Ecuador	Team
Pan American Games
Gold medal – first place	2015 Toronto	Team
- * Club domestic league appearances and goals as of 21 June 2024 ‡ National team caps and goals as of 21 June 2024

Darlene de Souza Reguera (born 11 January 1990), simply known as Darlene, is a Brazilian professional footballer. She participated at the 2015 FIFA Women's World Cup.

== Club career ==
From 2012 to 2013, Darlene played club football in the Austrian ÖFB-Frauenliga, first for SV Neulengbach, then for Spratzern. She scored two goals in Spratzern's 2013 Austrian Cup final win over Neulengbach.

Darlene joined compatriots Raquel Fernandes and Rafaelle Souza in transferring to Chinese Women's Super League club Changchun Zhuoyue in January 2016.

In April 2018, Darlene left relegated Zaragoza CFF to sign for newly formed Benfica, who were entering the Portuguese second division.

== International career ==
Darlene made her senior debut in December 2013, as a substitute in a 2–0 win over Chile at the 2013 Torneio Internacional de Brasília. In February 2015 Darlene was included in an 18-month residency programme intended to prepare Brazil's national team for the 2015 FIFA Women's World Cup in Canada and the 2016 Rio Olympics.

=== International goals ===
Goal	Date	Location	Opponent	#	Score	Result	Competition
goal 1	2013-12-22	Brasília, Brazil	Chile	1.1	3–0	5–0	Torneio Internacional 2013
goal 2	2014-03-10	Santiago, Chile	Venezuela	1.1	2–0	5–0	South American Games 2014
goal 3	2014-09-12	Loja, Ecuador	Bolivia	1.1	3–0	6–0	Copa América 2014
goal 4	2014-12-18	Brasília, Brazil	China	1.1	1–0	4–1	Torneio Internacional 2014
goal 5	2016-07-23	Fortaleza, Brazil	Australia	1.1	3–0	3–1	Friendly game
goal 6	2017-06-10	Fuenlabrada, Spain	Spain	1.1	1–1	1–2	Friendly game
goal 7	2018-11-10	Nice, Spain	France	1.1	3–1	3–1	Friendly game

== Personal life ==
Darlene is daughter of Chicão Reguera, women's football coach, Brazilian champion with Rio Preto EC, and Dorotéia de Souza, president of AE Realidade Jovem, which currently competes in the Campeonato Paulista de Futebol Feminino. His sister, Milene Reguera, is also a former player and the current coach of Realidade Jovem.

== Honours ==
Benfica

- Campeonato Nacional Feminino: 2020–21
- Campeonato Nacional II Divisão Feminino: 2018–19
- Taça de Portugal: 2018–19
- Taça da Liga: 2019–20, 2020–21
- Supertaça de Portugal: 2019

Rio Preto

- Campeonato Brasileiro Feminino: 2015

SV Neulengbach

- ÖFB-Frauenliga: 2011–12
- ÖFB Frauen Cup: 2011–12

Brazil

- Copa América Femenina: 2014
- Pan American Games: 2015
