= Nadezhda Karpova =

Russian footballer (born 1995)

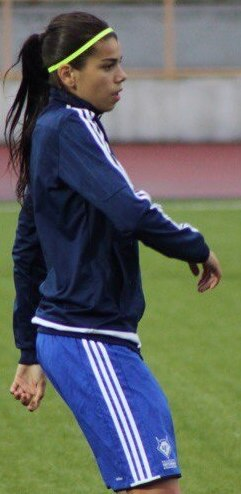
- Karpova in 2016

Personal information
- Full name: Nadezhda Alekseyevna Karpova
- Date of birth: 9 March 1995 (age 31)
- Place of birth: Yaroslavl, Russia
- Height: 1.79 m (5 ft 10 in)
- Position: Forward

Team information
- Current team: Espanyol
- Number: 9

Senior career*
Years	Team	Apps	(Gls)
2014	Zorky	3	(0)
2015–2017	Chertanovo Moscow	33	(11)
2017–2019	Valencia	24	(3)
2019–2020	Sevilla	19	(5)
2020–	Espanyol	2	(1)

International career^{‡}
2012–2014	Russia U19	21	(8)
2016–2019	Russia	24	(6)
- * Club domestic league appearances and goals as of 20:00, 12 October 2022 (UTC) ‡ National team caps and goals as of 07. June 2022

Nadezhda Alekseyevna Karpova (Russian: Наде́жда Алексе́евна Ка́рпова; born 9 March 1995) is a Russian footballer who plays as a forward for Spanish Primera División club RCD Espanyol and the Russia women's national team.

Yaroslavl-born Karpova made her senior national team debut in June 2016, scoring the second goal in Russia's 2–0 UEFA Women's Euro 2017 qualifying Group 5 win over Turkey in Khimki. She played for Russia at UEFA Women's Euro 2017.

== Personal life ==
Karpova has regularly spoken out against the Russian invasion of Ukraine, calling Putin and Lukashenko "human scum" and war criminals.

She is openly lesbian, having come out in 2022. She is the first openly gay Russian national team athlete, although her status in the team following the revelation is uncertain.

=== Stance on Russian athletes competing at the Olympics ===
She opposed Russia's participation at the 2024 Summer Olympics in Paris, stating:

I agree that now is probably not the moment when everyone should organize a sports festival and go to competitions, because these victories will be misinterpreted in Russia itself. Everything will work to strengthen the regime, and the people who make these decisions should understand this. It's no secret that, like for any dictator, sports for Putin is a powerful tool for fooling people. Therefore, I rather agree with Ukrainian politicians: none [of Russian athletes] should go to the Olympics.

Let's say athletes from Russia or Belarus, which is also involved in this conflict, will be asked to speak about the events in Ukraine. I recently came across such an interview: the Belarusian tennis player Azarenka was asked at the Australian Open what she thinks about what is happening (Victoria Azarenka was asked how she feels about the fact that fans carried the Russian flag and Z-symbols to the stands of the Australian Open), began to answer something like this: "Are you a politician? So I'm not a politician!" — in absolutely such a boorish form. And she doesn't say, "I won't discuss these topics" or "I'm afraid for my life, don't provoke me." She responds in such a way that another context is immediately included. A person who watches it in Australia gets the impression that this is just a "difficult political situation" and you can side with Russia, or you can side with Ukraine. And her strange response is super into the hands of this Putin propaganda. This is their main tool — constantly replacing concepts. And they have a huge task in the West: to plant in everyone's heads the idea that this is not a terrible aggressive war so that the dictator can remain in power. No, no, no! They want everyone to think it's "just politics." And when Putin starts flirting with athletes like Ovechkin, he and his political strategists understand perfectly well that they are buying the loyalty of millions of people who are fans of these athletes, and after all, it still works for propaganda.

I often notice that people from other countries also begin to experience the moment "not everything is so clear." And it seems to me that this should be stopped. We need to show that this war is absolutely terrible, and Putin is an aggressor, a fascist, an old dictator. People should understand this very clearly. Therefore, I am absolutely in solidarity with the Ukrainian government, which says: "Under such conditions, [Russian and Belarusian athletes] should not participate in the Olympics.

== International goals ==
No.	Date	Venue	Opponent	Score	Result	Competition
1.	2 June 2016	Arena Khimki, Khimki, Russia	Turkey	2–0	2–0	UEFA Women's Euro 2017 qualifying
2.	6 June 2016	Gradski stadion, Koprivnica, Croatia	Croatia	2–0	3–0	UEFA Women's Euro 2017 qualifying
3.	14 December 2016	Arena da Amazônia, Manaus, Brazil	Costa Rica	3–1	3–1	2016 International Women's Football Tournament
4.	17 December 2016	Arena da Amazônia, Manaus, Brazil	Costa Rica	1–0	1–0	2016 International Women's Football Tournament
5.	9 April 2017	BBVA Stadium, Houston, United States	United States	1–3	1–5	Friendly
6.	8 June 2017	Saturn Stadium, Ramenskoye, Russia	Serbia	4–2	5–2	Friendly
