= Yanara Aedo =

Chilean footballer (born 1993)

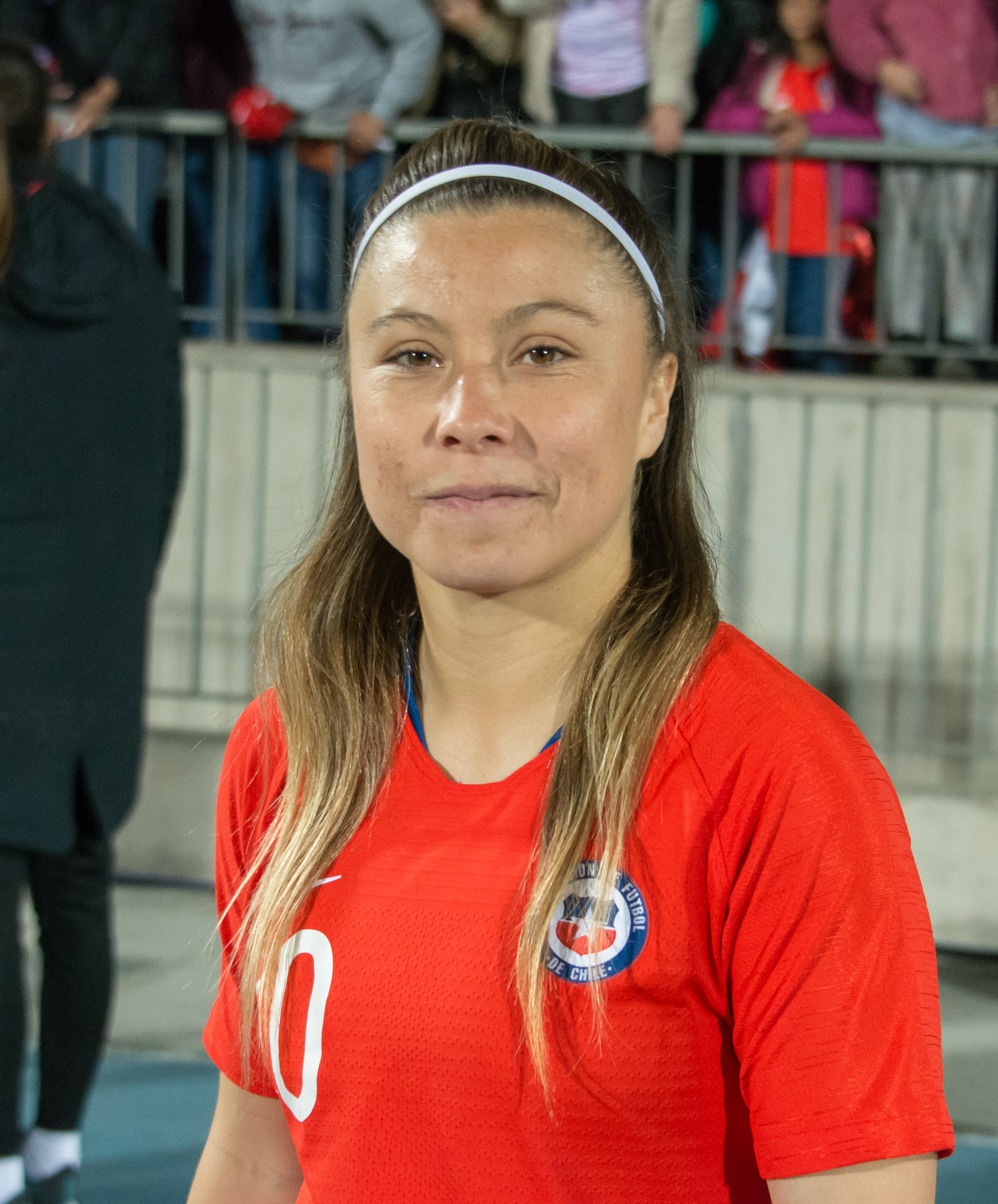
- Aedo with Chile in 2019

Personal information
- Full name: Yanara Katherine Nicole Aedo Muñoz
- Date of birth: 5 August 1993 (age 33)
- Place of birth: Temuco, Chile
- Height: 1.54 m (5 ft 1 in)
- Positions: Forward; midfielder

Team information
- Current team: Colo-Colo
- Number: 10

Youth career
- CDE Escuela Estándar de Temuco
- Araucanía Temuco

Senior career*
Years	Team	Apps	(Gls)
2009–2010	Araucanía Temuco		
2011–2014	Colo-Colo		
2015–2016	Washington Spirit Reserves		
2016–2017	Valencia	25	(7)
2017–2018	Washington Spirit	0	(0)
2018–2019	Valencia	26	(3)
2019–2020	Sevilla	9	(0)
2020–2022	Rayo Vallecano	63	(2)
2022–	Colo-Colo		

International career^{‡}
2010	Chile U17	3	(0)
2010–	Chile	56	(9)
Medal record
Women's football
Representing Chile
Pan American Games
Silver medal – second place	2023 Santiago	Team
South American Games
Silver medal – second place	2014 Santiago	Team
- * Club domestic league appearances and goals as of 29 February 2020 ‡ National team caps and goals as of 5 May 2019

Yanara Katherine Nicole Aedo Muñoz (born 5 August 1993) is a Chilean professional footballer who plays as a forward for Campeonato Nacional Fútbol Femenino club Colo-Colo and the Chile women's national team.

== Club career ==
Aedo left Colo-Colo for American National Women's Soccer League team Washington Spirit in January 2015. She helped the club's reserve team win the 2015 USL W-League season championship, scoring twice in the 2–1 final win over Colorado Pride.

In September 2016, Aedo transferred to Spain's Primera División club Valencia CF Femenino. On 27 June 2017, the Washington Spirit announced that they had re-signed Aedo. She was placed on waivers by the Spirit on 21 June 2018.

On 13 July 2018 it was announced that Aedo was returning to Valencia CF Femenino, the club she had played with from 2016 to 2017. She left the Spanish club at the end of the season. After stints with Sevilla and Rayo Vallecano, Aedo returned to Chile to rejoin Colo-Colo, with Chilean outlets confirming the news on 6 September 2022.

== International career ==
In early September 2010, seventeen-year-old Aedo represented Chile at the FIFA U-17 Women's World Cup. Later that month, she was named in Chile's 20-player senior squad for the 2010 South American Women's Football Championship in Ecuador. She scored the opening goal in Chile's 3–1 win over Peru. Aedo scored three goals at the 2018 Copa América Femenina, where Chile qualified to a FIFA Women's World Cup for the first time in its history.

She represented Chile at the 2023 Pan American Games, where Chile won the silver medal.

== Honours ==
Colo-Colo

- Primera División (13): 2011 Apertura, 2011 Clausura, 2012 Apertura, 2012 Clausura, 2013 Apertura, 2013 Clausura, 2014 Apertura, 2014 Clausura, 2022, 2023, 2024, 2025, 2026

Chile

- South American Games Silver medal: 2014
- Copa América Runner-up: 2018
- Torneio Internacional de Futebol Feminino: 2019
- Turkish Women's Cup: 2020
- Pan American Games Silver Medal: 2023

Individual

- Premios FutFem - The Best: 2023
- Primera División Ideal Team: 2024, 2025
- Premios América Responde - El País Best Female Player of Chile: 2023, 2024

== International goals ==
Scores and results list Chile's goal tally first

No.	Date	Venue	Opponent	Score	Result	Competition
1	10 November 2010	Estadio Bellavista, Ambato, Ecuador	Peru	1–0	3–1	2010 South American Women's Football Championship
2	4 April 2018	Estadio La Portada, La Serena, Chile	Paraguay	1–1	1–1	2018 Copa América Femenina
3	12 April 2018	Estadio La Portada, La Serena, Chile	Peru	1–0	5–0	2018 Copa América Femenina
4	12 April 2018	Estadio La Portada, La Serena, Chile	Peru	4–0	5–0	2018 Copa América Femenina
5	30 August 2019	Pacaembu Stadium, São Paulo, Brazil	Costa Rica	1–0	1–0	2019 International Women's Football Tournament of City of São Paulo
6	8 October 2019	Estadio El Teniente, Rancagua, Chile	Uruguay	1–1	3–1	Friendly
7	7 March 2020	Starlight Sport Complex, Antalya, Turkey	Kenya	3–0	5–0	2020 Turkish Women's Cup
8	10 March 2020	Gold City Sport Complex, Alanya, Turkey	Northern Ireland	1–0	5–0	2020 Turkish Women's Cup
9	25 November 2021	Arena da Amazônia, Manaus, Brazil	Venezuela	1–0	1–0	2021 International Women's Football Tournament of Manaus
10	19 February 2022	Estadio Sausalito, Viña del Mar, Chile	Ecuador	1–0	3–1	Friendly
11	26 September 2023	Quilín Complex, Santiago, Chile	New Zealand	1–0	2–1	Friendly
12	1 December 2023	Estadio Bicentenario de La Florida, Santiago, Chile	Peru	1–0	1–0	Friendly
13	12 July 2024	Estadio Carfrem Ypané, Ypané, Paraguay	Paraguay	1–0	4–1	Friendly
14	2 December 2025	Estadio El Teniente, Rancagua, Chile	Paraguay	1–0	1–0	2025–26 CONMEBOL Women's Nations League

== See also ==
- List of women's footballers with 100 or more international caps
