= Chicão Reguera =

Brazilian women's football manager

Personal information
- Full name: Francisco Reguera Inojo
- Date of birth: 1957 (age 68–69)
- Place of birth: Bálsamo, Brazil

Managerial career
- Years: Team
- 2008–2018: Rio Preto (women)
- 2019: Ponte Preta (women)
- 2020–2022: Realidade Jovem (women)

Francisco Reguera Inojo (born 1957), better known as Chicão, is a Brazilian former women's football manager.

== Biography ==
Owner of a construction materials store in the city of São José do Rio Preto, in 2003 he became the coach of his daughters, Darlene, Sharlene and Milene, who dreamed of becoming players. In 2008, he became the coach of the Rio Preto women's team, a project that lasted from 2008 to 2018 and resulted in the conquest of two state titles and a Brazilian championship. He also coached Ponte Preta in 2019 and in 2020, he affiliated his own team with his spouse Doróteia de Souza, in the São Paulo Federation, the AE Realidade Jovem, which he managed from 2020 to 2022, being succeeded by his daughter Milene.

== Honours ==
Rio Preto women

- Campeonato Paulista: 2016, 2017
- Campeonato Brasileiro Série A1: 2015
