= Han Peng (footballer, born 1989) =

Chinese footballer

Han Peng 韩鹏
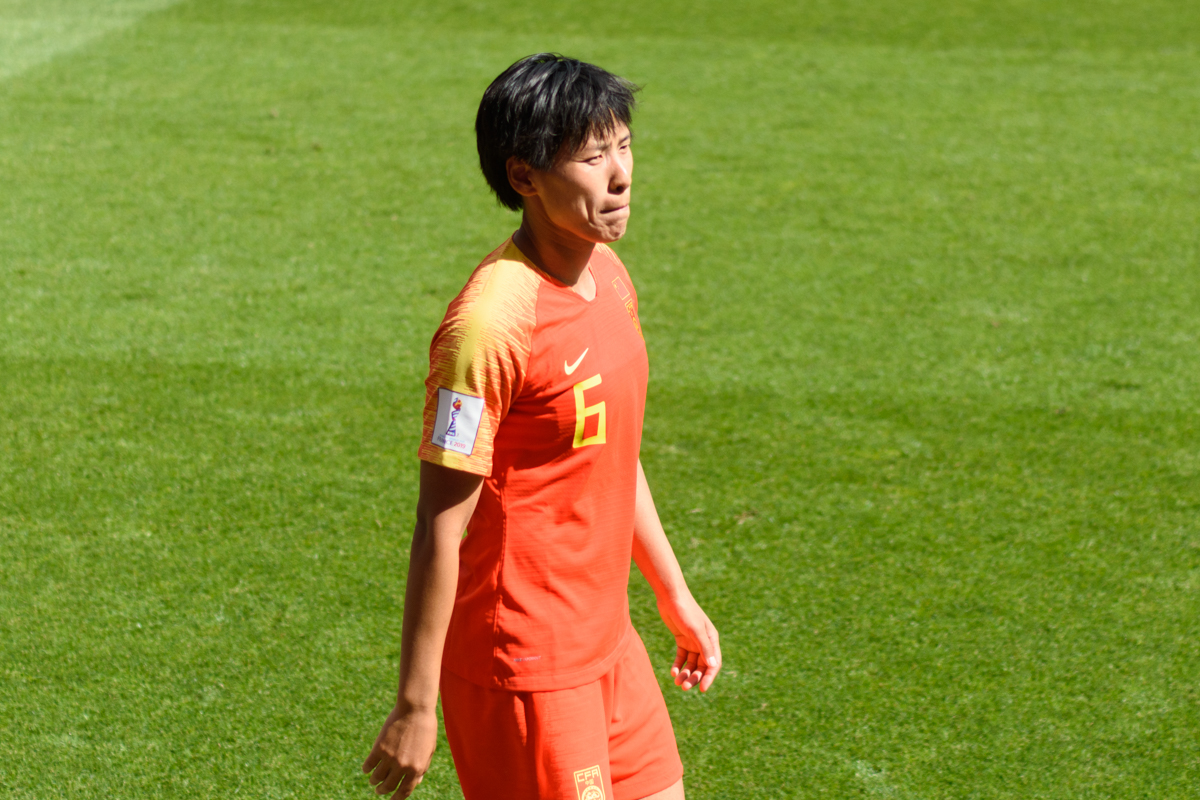

Personal information
- Full name: Han Peng
- Date of birth: 20 December 1989 (age 36)
- Place of birth: Tianjin, China
- Height: 1.65 m (5 ft 5 in)
- Position: Midfielder

Senior career*
Years	Team	Apps	(Gls)
-2017	Tianjin		
2018	Changchun Public Excellence		
2019	Guangdong		
2020	Wuhan Jianghan University	11	(4)
2021	Tianjin Shengde		
2021-2024	Wuhan Jianghan University	15	(2)

International career^{‡}
2012–2019	China	97	(4)
Medal record
Women's football
Representing China
Asian Games
Silver medal – second place	2018 Palembang	Team
- * Club domestic league appearances and goals ‡ National team caps and goals as of 25 June 2019

Han Peng (simplified Chinese: 韩鹏; traditional Chinese: 韓鵬; pinyin: Hán Péng; born 20 December 1989) is a Chinese former footballer who played as a midfielder.

== International career ==
Han Peng made her debut for the Chinese women's national team on 15 February 2012 against Mexico. At the 2014 Torneio Internacional de Brasília de Futebol Feminino, Han Peng scored a "tremendous strike" in China's 1–1 draw with the United States.

== International goals ==
No.	Date	Venue	Opponent	Score	Result	Competition
1.	15 December 2012	FAU Stadium, Boca Raton, United States	United States	1–2	1–4	Friendly
2.	18 September 2014	Incheon Namdong Asiad Rugby Field, Incheon, South Korea	Chinese Taipei	1–0	4–0	2014 Asian Games
3.	10 December 2014	Estádio Nacional Mané Garrincha, Brasília, Brazil	United States	1–1	1–1	2014 International Women's Football Tournament of Brasília

== Honours ==
China

- Asian Games silver medalist: 2018
- AFC Women's Asian Cup third place: 2014, 2018
