= Josée Bélanger =

Canadian soccer player

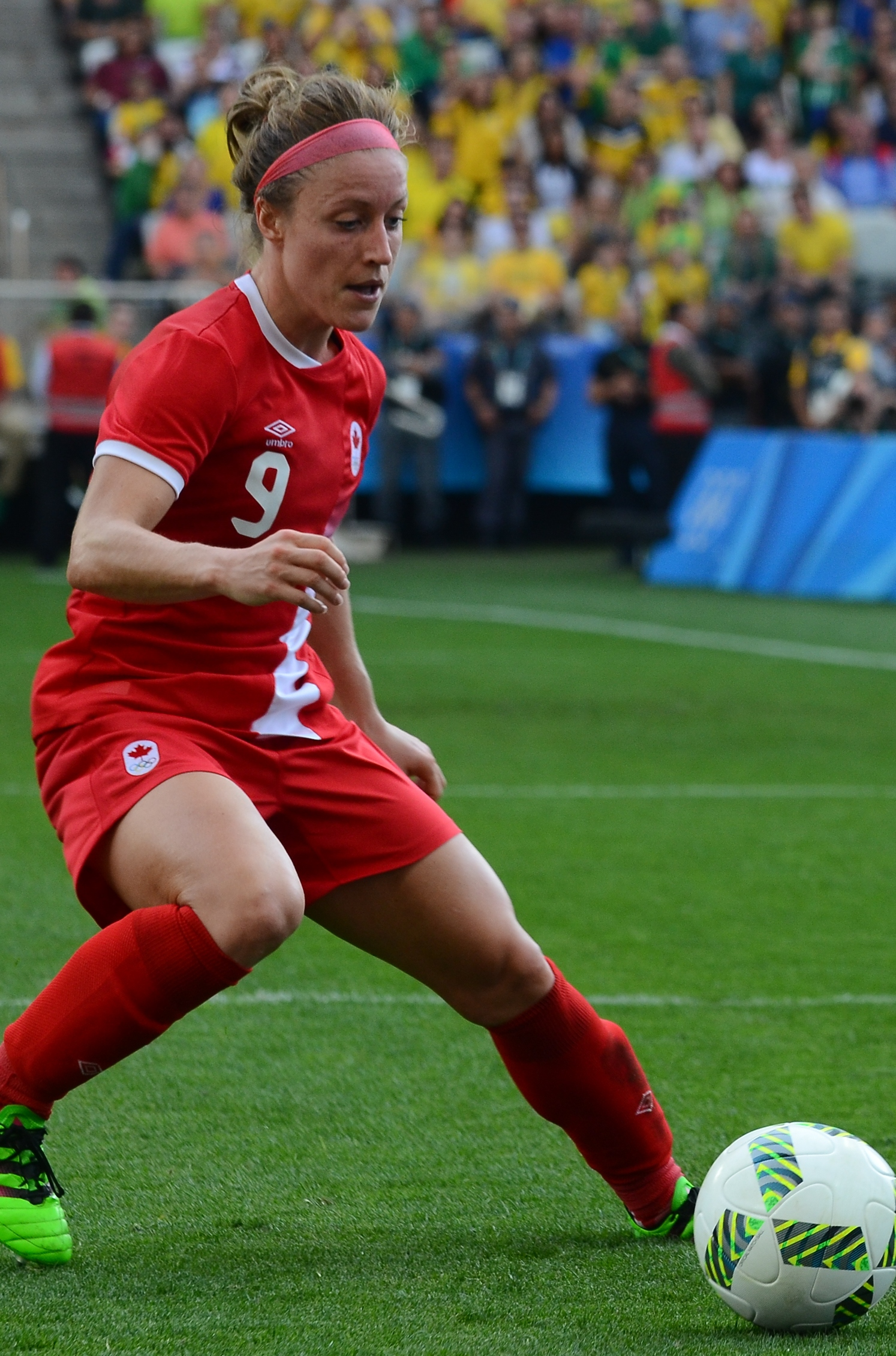
- Bélanger in São Paulo, during a match against Brazil, which gave Canada the bronze medal in women's football for Rio 2016

Personal information
- Full name: Josée Bélanger
- Date of birth: May 14, 1986 (age 40)
- Place of birth: Coaticook, Quebec, Canada
- Height: 1.63 m (5 ft 4 in)
- Positions: Full back; winger

College career
Years	Team	Apps	(Gls)
2006–2011	Sherbrooke Vert et Or		

Senior career*
Years	Team	Apps	(Gls)
2007	Laval Comets	5	(3)
2009–2012	Quebec City Amiral SC	25	(13)
2014	Laval Comets	6	(1)
2015	FC Rosengård	9	(2)
2016	Orlando Pride	14	(0)

International career
2004	Canada U-19	8	(4)
2004–2017	Canada	57	(7)
Medal record
Olympic Games
Bronze medal – third place	2016 Rio de Janeiro	Team
- * Club domestic league appearances and goals

Josée Bélanger (born May 14, 1986) is a Canadian former soccer player who played for Orlando Pride in the National Women's Soccer League and for the Canadian national team.

== Club career ==
In 2011, Bélanger suffered an ankle injury that kept her out of the 2011 FIFA Women's World Cup and the 2012 Summer Olympics. During this time, she worked at a soccer club, and worked her way back into the national team by playing at right-back, at request of John Herdman due to injury problems.

Bélanger signed with FC Rosengård in August 2015.

On February 8, 2016, it was announced that Bélanger would play for the Orlando Pride for the 2016 season of the National Women's Soccer League via the NWSL Player Allocation. She described the club as treating her and her teammates like "professional players".

In May 2017, Bélanger announced her retirement from football, finishing her career with 57 appearances for Canada, with 7 goals and 8 assists for the national team.

== International career ==
She won a regional gold medal with Canada on two occasions, first at the 2004 CONCACAF Women's U-19 Championship and subsequently at the 2010 CONCACAF Women's Championship.

On 27 October 2010, Bélanger was called up to the Canada squad for the 2010 CONCACAF Women's World Cup Qualifying.

On 27 April 2015, Bélanger was called up to the Canada squad for the 2015 FIFA Women's World Cup.

On 20 June 2016, Bélanger was called up to the Canada squad for the 2016 Summer Olympics.

Bélanger was honoured by Canada Soccer in June 2017, along with fellow Olympic bronze medalists Jonelle Filigno, Robyn Gayle, Kaylyn Kyle and Lauren Sesselmann.

=== International statistics ===
Canada
Year	Apps	Goals
2004	1	0
2010	10	5
2014	11	0
2015	17	2
2016	17	0
2017	1	0
Total	57	7

=== International goals ===
Scores and results list Canada's goal tally first.

#	Date	Venue	Opponent	Score	Result	Competition
1.	June 3, 2010	Hamar, Norway	Norway	1–0	1–1	Friendly
2.	November 2, 2010	Cancún, Mexico	Mexico	2–0	3–0	2010 CONCACAF Women's Championship
3.	November 5, 2010	Cancún, Mexico	Costa Rica	1–0	4–0	2010 CONCACAF Women's Championship
4.	December 9, 2010	São Paulo, Brazil	Netherlands	2–0	5–0	2010 International Women's Football Tournament
5.	December 19, 2010	São Paulo, Brazil	Brazil	1–0	2–2	2010 International Women's Football Tournament
6.	June 21, 2015	Vancouver, Canada	Switzerland	1–0	1–0	2015 FIFA Women's World Cup
7.	December 16, 2015	Natal, Brazil	Brazil	1–2	1–2	2015 International Women's Football Tournament

== Honours ==
Canada

- Summer Olympic Games: Bronze Medal, 2016
