= 2016 International Women's Football Tournament of Manaus =

2016 Torneio Internacional de Manaus de Futebol Feminino
Torneio Internacional de Manaus, International Tournament of Manaus

Tournament details
- Host country: Brazil
- City: Manaus
- Dates: 7–18 December
- Teams: 4
- Venue(s): 1 (in 1 host city)

Final positions
- Champions: Brazil
- Runners-up: Italy
- Third place: Russia
- Fourth place: Costa Rica

The 2016 Torneio Internacional de Manaus de Futebol Feminino (also known as the 2016 International Tournament of Manaus) is the eighth edition of the Torneio Internacional de Futebol Feminino, an invitational women's football tournament held every December in Brazil. Previously held in the cities of Brasília, São Paulo and Natal, 2016 is the first year the tournament will be held in Manaus. The tournament will run from December 7–18, 2016.

== Format ==
In the first phase, the four teams play each other within the group in a single round. The two teams with the most points earned in the respective group, qualify for the next phase. In the final stage, the first and second teams placed in the Group contest the final. If the match ends in a tie, the team with the best record in the first phase is declared the winner. The third and fourth teams placed in the group contest the third place play-off. If the match ends in a tie, the team with the best record in the first phase is declared the winner.

== Venues ==
All matches will take place at Arena da Amazônia in Manaus.

== Squads ==
- Brazil
- Costa Rica
- Italy
- Russia

== Group stage ==
All times are local (UTC−03:00)

Team	Pld	W	D	L	GF	GA	GD	Pts
Brazil	3	3	0	0	13	1	+12	9
Italy	3	2	0	1	7	3	+4	6
Russia	3	1	0	2	3	8	−5	3
Costa Rica	3	0	0	3	1	12	−11	0

7 December 2016
19:30

Italy	3–0	Russia
Gama 15'; Bergamaschi 50'; Gabbiadini 63'	Report

Arena da Amazônia
7 December 2016
22:45

Brazil	6–0	Costa Rica
Andressinha 25'; Tamires 28'; Gabi Zanotti 45', 47'; Bia 53', 73'	Report

Arena da Amazônia

11 December 2016
16:30

Italy	3–0	Costa Rica
Gabbiadini 7'; Piemonte 19'; Mauro 35'	Report

Arena da Amazônia
11 December 2016
18:45

Brazil	4–0	Russia
Bia 12', 49'; Debinha 14', 60'	Report

Arena da Amazônia

14 December 2016
19:30

Costa Rica	1–3	Russia
Herrera 66'	Report	Pantyukhina 45'; Morozova 60'; Karpova 85'

Arena da Amazônia
14 December 2016
22:45

Brazil	3–1	Italy
Andressinha 30'; Bartoli 76' (o.g.); Debinha 90+1'	Report	Parisi 45' (pen.)

Arena da Amazônia

== Knockout stage ==
=== Third place match ===
18 December 2016
16:30

Russia	1–0	Costa Rica
Karpova 27'	Report

Arena da Amazônia

=== Final ===
18 December 2016
18:45

Brazil	5–3	Italy
Bia 8'; Gabi 20'; Andressa 36', 47'; Debinha 60'	Report	Mauro 14'; Gabbiadini 32'; Bonansea 56'

Arena da Amazônia

== Final results ==
2016 International Women's Football Tournament of Manaus Champions
(Brazil)
Brazil
Seventh title

== Goalscorers ==
5 goals

- (Brazil) Bia

4 goals

- (Brazil) Andressinha
- (Brazil) Debinha

3 goals

- (Brazil) Gabi Zanotti
- (Italy) Gabbiadini

2 goals

- (Italy) Ilaria Mauro
- (Russia) Nadezhda Karpova

1 goals

- (Brazil) Tamires
- (Costa Rica) Melissa Herrera
- (Italy) Barbara Bonansea
- (Italy) Alice Parisi
- (Italy) Martina Piemonte
- (Italy) Sara Gama
- (Italy) Valentina Bergamaschi
- (Russia) Elena Morozova
- (Russia) Ekaterina Pantyukhina

1 own goal

- (Italy) Bartoli (playing against Brazil)
