= 2015 International Women's Football Tournament of Natal =

2015 Torneio Internacional de Natal de Futebol Feminino
Torneio Internacional de Natal, International Tournament of Natal

Tournament details
- Host country: Brazil
- City: Natal
- Dates: 9–20 December
- Teams: 4
- Venue: 1 (in 1 host city)

Final positions
- Champions: Brazil
- Runners-up: Canada
- Third place: Mexico
- Fourth place: Trinidad and Tobago

Tournament statistics
- Matches played: 8
- Goals scored: 37 (4.63 per match)
- Top scorer(s): Marta (7 goals)

The 2015 Torneio Internacional de Natal de Futebol Feminino (also known as the 2015 International Tournament of Natal) was the seventh edition of the Torneio Internacional de Futebol Feminino, an invitational women's football tournament held every December in Brazil. Previously held in the cities of Brasília and São Paulo, 2015 is the first year the tournament was held in Natal. The tournament ran from December 9–20, 2015.

== Format ==
In the first phase, the four teams play each other within the group in a single round. The two teams with the most points earned in the respective group, qualify for the next phase. In the final stage, the first and second teams placed in the Group contest the final. If the match ends in a tie, the team with the best record in the first phase is declared the winner. The third and fourth teams placed in the group contest the third place play-off. If the match ends in a tie, the team with the best record in the first phase is declared the winner.

== Venues ==
All matches took place at Arena das Dunas in Natal.

2015 International Women's Football Tournament of Natal is located in Brazil	Natal, RN
Arena das Dunas; Capacity: 68,009

== Squads ==
- Brazil
- Canada
- Mexico
- Trinidad and Tobago (replacing Croatia)

== Group stage ==
All times are local (UTC−03:00)

Team	Pld	W	D	L	GF	GA	GD	Pts
Brazil	3	3	0	0	19	1	+18	9
Canada	3	2	0	1	8	2	+6	6
Mexico	3	1	0	2	3	9	−6	3
Trinidad and Tobago	3	0	0	3	0	18	−18	0

9 December 2015
18:15

Canada	3–0	Mexico
Sinclair 15', 20'; Prince 45+2'	Report

Arena das Dunas
Attendance: 500
Referee: Simone Xavier
9 December 2015
20:45

Brazil	11–0	Trinidad and Tobago
Marta 10', 28', 30', 52', 58'; Beatriz 33', 55', 64'; Debinha 48'; Raquel 70'; Rilany 79'	Report

Arena das Dunas

13 December 2015
16:00

Mexico	0–6	Brazil
	Report	Marta 2' (pen.), 11' (pen.); Debinha 18'; Andressa 32'; Formiga 53'; Poliana 68'

Arena das Dunas
13 December 2015
18:30

Trinidad and Tobago	0–4	Canada
	Report	Matheson 10'; Beckie 46'; Prince 81'; Sinclair 85'

Arena das Dunas
Attendance: 6,428
Referee: Alessandro Matos

16 December 2015
18:15

Trinidad and Tobago	0–3	Mexico
		Johnson 10'; Ocampo 86'; Monsiváis 90+2'

Arena das Dunas
16 December 2015
20:45

Brazil	2–1	Canada
Andressa 12'; Debinha 40'	Report	Bélanger 43'

Arena das Dunas

== Knockout stage ==
No penalty shoot-out were held. If tied, the team with better group stage record win the match.

=== Third place match ===
20 December 2015
16:00

Mexico	2–1	Trinidad and Tobago
Monsiváis 13'; Superville 90' (o.g.)		Shade 90+2'

Arena das Dunas

=== Final ===
20 December 2015
18:30

Brazil	3–1	Canada
Andressa 47'; Mônica 63', 81'	Report	Beckie 46'

Arena das Dunas

== Final results ==
2015 Torneio Internacional de Natal Champions
(Brazil)
Brazil
Sixth title

== Goalscorers ==
7 goals

- (Brazil) Marta

3 goals

- (Brazil) Andressa
- (Brazil) Beatriz
- (Brazil) Debinha
- (Canada) Christine Sinclair

2 goals

- (Brazil) Mônica
- (Canada) Janine Beckie
- (Canada) Nichelle Prince
- (Mexico) Desirée Monsiváis

1 goal

- (Brazil) Formiga
- (Brazil) Poliana
- (Brazil) Raquel
- (Brazil) Rilany
- (Canada) Josée Bélanger
- (Canada) Diana Matheson
- (Mexico) Katie Johnson
- (Mexico) Mónica Ocampo
- (Trinidad and Tobago) Mariah Shade

1 own goal

- (Trinidad and Tobago) Patrice Superville (playing against Mexico)
