= 2012 International Women's Football Tournament of City of São Paulo =

2012 Torneio Internacional Cidade de São Paulo de Futebol Feminino
Tournament details
- Host country: Brazil
- Dates: 9–19 December
- Teams: 4 (from 3 confederations)
- Venue(s): 1 (in 1 host city)

Final positions
- Champions: Brazil (3rd title)
- Runners-up: Denmark
- Third place: Mexico
- Fourth place: Portugal

Tournament statistics
- Matches played: 8
- Goals scored: 22 (2.75 per match)
- Top scorer(s): (Brazil) Fabiana (Denmark) Line Røddik Hansen (Denmark) Johanna Rasmussen (Mexico) Sofia Huerta (Note: She switched her international allegiance into United States in 2017.) (2 goals)

The 2012 Torneio Internacional Cidade de São Paulo (also known as the 2012 International Tournament of São Paulo) was the fourth edition of the Torneio Internacional Cidade de São Paulo de Futebol Feminino, an invitational women's football tournament held annually in Brazil. It began on 9 December and ended on 19 December 2012.

== Format ==
The four invited teams were in. In the first phase, the teams played each other within the group in a single round. The two teams with the most points earned in the respective group, were qualified for the next phase.

In the final stage, the first and second teams placed in Group. Played only one match, becoming the champion, the winner team. If the match ends in a tie, will be considered champion, the team with the best campaign in the first phase.

The third and fourth teams placed in the group. Played in one game, becoming the third-placed, the winner team. If the match ends in a tie, will be considered champion, the team with the best campaign in the first phase.

== Teams ==
Listed are the confirmed teams.

- Brazil
- Denmark
- Mexico
- Portugal

== Group stage ==
All times are local

=== Group A ===
Team	Pld	W	D	L	GF	GA	GD	Pts
Brazil	3	2	0	1	7	3	+4	6
Denmark	3	1	1	1	6	2	+4	4
Portugal	3	1	1	1	1	4	−3	4
Mexico	3	1	0	2	2	7	−5	3

9 December 2012
16:00

Brazil	4–0	Portugal
Cristiane 8'; Fabiana 35'; Marta 46'; Giovânia 80'	Report

Estádio do Pacaembu
Referee: Katiucia da Mota Lima (Brazil)

9 December 2012
18:00

Mexico	0–5	Denmark
	Report	Hansen 5'; Rasmussen 7'; Harder 19' (pen.); Nielsen 30'; Pedersen 63'

Estádio do Pacaembu
Referee: Edilar Maria Ferreira (Brazil)

13 December 2012
19:30

Denmark	0–0	Portugal

Estádio do Pacaembu

13 December 2012
21:50

Brazil	1–2	Mexico
Rosana 14'	Report	Guajardo 61'; Dominguez 89'

Estádio do Pacaembu

16 December 2012
16:00

Brazil	2–1	Denmark
Érika 7'; Débora 90'	Report	Hansen 90+2' (pen.)

Estádio do Pacaembu

16 December 2012
18:00

Portugal	1–0	Mexico
Edite 73'	Report

Estádio do Pacaembu

== Knockout stage ==
=== Third place match ===
19 December 2012
18:30

Portugal	0–2	Mexico
	Report	Huerta 68', 89'

Estádio do Pacaembu
Referee: Édila Maia Ferreira (Brazil)

=== Final ===
19 December 2012
20:50

Brazil	2–2	Denmark
Andressa 29' (pen.); Fabiana 45+3'	Report	Rasmussen 83' (pen.); Pedersen 87'

Estádio do Pacaembu
Referee: Regildenia de Holanda Moura (Brazil)

== Final results ==
2012 Torneio Internacional Cidade de São Paulo Champions
(Brazil)
Brazil
Third title

== Goalscorers ==
2 goals

- (Brazil) Fabiana
- (Denmark) Line Røddik Hansen
- (Denmark) Johanna Rasmussen
- (Mexico) Sofia Huerta

1 goal

- (Brazil) Andressa
- (Brazil) Cristiane
- (Brazil) Débora
- (Brazil) Érika
- (Brazil) Rosana
- (Brazil) Marta
- (Brazil) Giovania
- (Denmark) Katrine Pedersen
- (Denmark) Pernille Harder
- (Denmark) Sanne Troelsgaard Nielsen
- (Denmark) Sofie Junge Pedersen
- (Mexico) Anisa Guajardo
- (Mexico) Maribel Dominguez
- (Portugal) Edite Fernandes
