= Isidora Hernández =

Chilean footballer (born 1996)

Personal information
- Full name: Isidora Jeanette Hernandez Merino
- Date of birth: 22 August 1996 (age 30)
- Place of birth: Santiago, Chile
- Height: 1.72 m (5 ft 8 in)
- Position: Forward

Team information
- Current team: Santiago Morning

College career
Years	Team	Apps	(Gls)
2015	Limestone College		

Senior career*
Years	Team	Apps	(Gls)
2012–2014	Universidad Católica		
2015	Universidad de Chile		
2016–2018	Universidad de Chile		
2019	Universidad Católica		
2020–2022	Santiago Morning		
2023	Deportivo Cali		
2023–2024	Montespaccato Calcio		
2025–	Santiago Morning		

International career^{‡}
2021–	Chile	4	(1)
- * Club domestic league appearances and goals as of 22 August 2023 ‡ National team caps and goals as of 19 January 2023

Isidora Jeanette Hernández Merino (born 22 August 1996) is a Chilean footballer who plays as a forward for Santiago Morning.

== Club career ==
After spent four seasons with Santiago Morning, on 17 January 2023 Hernández joined Colombian side Deportivo Cali, reuniting with his compatriot Gisela Pino.

On 22 August 2023, she joined Italian club Montespaccato on a free transfer.

Back in Chile, Hernández rejoined Santiago Morning in February 2025.

== International career ==
On 28 November 2021, Hernández made her debut for the Chile senior national team in a friendly match against India: in the process, she also scored her first international goal, thus contributing to a 3–0 victory.
