= 2011 International Women's Football Tournament of City of São Paulo =

2011 Torneio Internacional Cidade de São Paulo de Futebol Feminino
Tournament details
- Host country: Brazil
- Dates: 8–18 December
- Teams: 4 (from 3 confederations)
- Venue: 1 (in 1 host city)

Final positions
- Champions: Brazil (2nd title)
- Runners-up: Denmark
- Third place: Italy
- Fourth place: Chile

Tournament statistics
- Matches played: 8
- Goals scored: 33 (4.13 per match)
- Top scorer(s): (Brazil) Érika (4 goals)

The 2011 Torneio Internacional Cidade de São Paulo (also known as the 2011 International Tournament of São Paulo) was the third edition of the Torneio Internacional Cidade de São Paulo de Futebol Feminino, an invitational women's football tournament held annually in Brazil. It began on 8 December and ended on 18 December 2011.

== Format ==
The four invited teams were in. In the first phase, the teams played each other within the group in a single round. The two teams with the most points earned in the respective group, were qualified for the next phase.

In the final stage, the first and second teams placed in Group. Played only one match, becoming the champion, the winner team. If the match ends in a tie, will be considered champion, the team with the best campaign in the first phase.

The third and fourth teams placed in the group. Played in one game, becoming the third-placed, the winner team. If the match ends in a tie, will be considered champion, the team with the best campaign in the first phase.

== Teams ==
Listed are the confirmed teams.

- Brazil
- Chile
- Denmark
- Italy

== Group stage ==
All times are local

=== Group A ===
Team	Pld	W	D	L	GF	GA	GD	Pts
Denmark	3	2	1	0	7	2	+5	7
Brazil	3	2	0	1	9	2	+7	6
Italy	3	1	1	1	9	7	+2	4
Chile	3	0	0	3	0	14	−14	0

8 December 2011
18:45

Denmark	4–0	Chile
K. Pedersen 62'; Nielsen 79'; S. Pedersen 86'; Harder 87'	Report

Estádio do Pacaembu
Referee: Edilar Ferreira (Brazil)

8 December 2011
21:15

Brazil	5–1	Italy
Érika 19'; Ester 61'; Cristiane 68'; Marta 89'; Aline 90'	Report	Tona 18'

Estádio do Pacaembu
Referee: Regildenia Moura (Brazil)

11 December 2011
14:30

Denmark	2–2	Italy
Hansen 49' (pen.); Harder 89'	Report	Parisi 5' (pen.); Gabbiadini 81'

Estádio do Pacaembu
Referee: Fernanda de Souza (Brazil)

11 December 2011
17:00

Brazil	4–0	Chile
Érika 13'; Rosana 21'; Thaís Guedes 26'; Fabiana 55'	Report

Estádio do Pacaembu
Referee: Katiucia Lima (Brazil)

15 December 2011
18:45

Chile	0–6	Italy

Estádio do Pacaembu

15 December 2011
21:15

Brazil	0–1	Denmark

Estádio do Pacaembu

== Knockout stage ==
=== Third place match ===
18 December 2012

Italy	3–2	Chile

Estádio do Pacaembu

=== Final ===
18 December 2012

Brazil	2–1	Denmark
Érika 64', 74'		Harder 54'

Estádio do Pacaembu

== Final results ==
2011 Torneio Internacional Cidade de São Paulo Champions
(Brazil)
Brazil
Second title

== Goalscorers ==
4 goals

- (Brazil) Érika

3 goals

- (Denmark) Pernille Harder

1 goal

- (Brazil) Aline
- (Brazil) Cristiane
- (Brazil) Ester
- (Brazil) Fabiana
- (Brazil) Marta
- (Brazil) Rosana
- (Brazil) Thaís Guedes
- (Denmark) Kristine Pedersen
- (Denmark) Line Roddik Hansen
- (Denmark) Sanne Troelsgaard Nielsen
- (Denmark) Sofie Junge Pedersen
- (Italy) Alice Parisi
- (Italy) Melania Gabbiadini
- (Italy) Elisabetta Tona
