= 2014 International Women's Football Tournament of Brasília =

2014 Torneio Internacional de Brasília de Futebol Feminino
Torneio Internacional de Brasília, International Tournament of Brasília

Tournament details
- Host country: Brazil
- City: Brasília
- Dates: 10–21 December
- Teams: 4
- Venue: 1 (in 1 host city)

Final positions
- Champions: Brazil
- Runners-up: United States
- Third place: China
- Fourth place: Argentina

Tournament statistics
- Matches played: 8
- Goals scored: 29 (3.63 per match)
- Top scorer(s): Carli Lloyd (5 goals)

The 2014 Torneio Internacional de Brasília de Futebol Feminino (also known as the 2014 International Tournament of Brasilia) was the sixth edition of the Torneio Internacional de Futebol Feminino, an invitational women's football tournament held every December in Brazil. The tournament ran from December 10–21, 2014.

== Format ==
In the first phase, the four teams play each other within the group in a single round. The two teams with the most points earned in the respective group, qualify for the next phase. In the final stage, the first and second teams placed in the Group contest the final. If the match ends in a tie, the team with the best record in the first phase is declared the winner. The third and fourth teams placed in the group contest the third place play-off. If the match ends in a tie, the team with the best record in the first phase is declared the winner.

== Venues ==
All matches took place at Estádio Nacional Mané Garrincha in Brasília.

2014 International Women's Football Tournament of Brasília is located in Brazil	Brasília, DF
Estádio Nacional Mané Garrincha; Capacity: 68,009

== Squads ==
- Brazil
- China
- United States
- Argentina

== Group stage ==
All times are local (UTC−02:00)

Team	Pld	W	D	L	GF	GA	GD	Pts
Brazil	3	3	0	0	11	3	+8	9
United States	3	1	1	1	10	4	+6	4
China	3	1	1	1	8	5	+3	4
Argentina	3	0	0	3	0	17	−17	0

10 December 2014
19:20

United States	1–1	China
Lloyd 23'	Report	Han Peng 67'

Estádio Nacional Mané Garrincha
Attendance: 1,601
10 December 2014
21:50

Brazil	4–0	Argentina
Debinha 14'; Formiga 41', 82'; Raquel 78'	Report

Estádio Nacional Mané Garrincha
Attendance: 1,603

14 December 2014
16:00

Argentina	0–6	China
	Report	Wang Shuang 49'; Tang Jiali 52'; Gu Yasha 64'; Zhang Rui 85', 88', 90'

Estádio Nacional Mané Garrincha
Attendance: 2,710
14 December 2014
18:45

Brazil	3–2	United States
Marta 19', 55', 64'	Report	Lloyd 6'; Rapinoe 9'

Estádio Nacional Mané Garrincha
Attendance: 2,711

18 December 2014
19:20

United States	7–0	Argentina
Press 9', 23', 41', 78'; Lloyd 30', 44', 47'	Report

Estádio Nacional Mané Garrincha
Attendance: 1,717
18 December 2014
21:50

Brazil	4–1	China
Darlene 13'; Andressinha 25'; Debinha 60'; Andressa 64' (pen.)	Report	Ren Guixin 90+3'

Estádio Nacional Mané Garrincha
Attendance: 1,718

== Knockout stage ==
No penalty shoot-out were held. If tied, the team with better group stage record win the match. Thus China finished third and Brazil won the tournament.

=== Third place match ===
21 December 2014
16:00

China	0–0	Argentina
	Report

Estádio Nacional Mané Garrincha

=== Final ===
21 December 2014
19:00

Brazil	0–0	United States
	Report

Estádio Nacional Mané Garrincha
Attendance: 11,287

== Final results ==
2014 Torneio Internacional Cidade de Brasília Champions
(Brazil)
Brazil
Fifth title

== Goalscorers ==
5 goals

- (United States) Carli Lloyd

4 goals

- (United States) Christen Press

3 goals

- (Brazil) Marta
- (China) Zhang Rui

2 goals

- (Brazil) Debinha
- (Brazil) Formiga

1 goal

- (Brazil) Andressa
- (Brazil) Andressinha
- (Brazil) Darlene
- (Brazil) Raquel
- (China) Han Peng
- (China) Ren Guixin
- (United States) Megan Rapinoe
