= 2010 International Women's Football Tournament of City of São Paulo =

2010 Torneio Internacional Cidade de São Paulo de Futebol Feminino
Tournament details
- Host country: Brazil
- Dates: 9–19 December
- Teams: 4 (from 3 confederations)
- Venue: 1 (in 1 host city)

Final positions
- Champions: Canada (1st title)
- Runners-up: Brazil
- Third place: Netherlands
- Fourth place: Mexico

Tournament statistics
- Matches played: 8
- Goals scored: 26 (3.25 per match)
- Top scorer(s): (Brazil) Marta (6 goals)

The 2010 Torneio Internacional Cidade de São Paulo (also known as the 2010 International Tournament of São Paulo) was the second edition of the Torneio Internacional Cidade de São Paulo de Futebol Feminino, an invitational women's football tournament held annually in Brazil. It began on 9 December and ended on 19 December 2010.

== Format ==
The four invited teams were in. In the first phase, the teams played each other within the group in a single round. The two teams with the most points earned in the respective group, were qualified for the next phase.

In the final stage, the first and second teams placed in Group. Played only one match, becoming the champion, the winner team. If the match ends in a tie, will be considered champion, the team with the best campaign in the first phase.

The third and fourth teams placed in the group. Played in one game, becoming the third-placed, the winner team. If the match ends in a tie, will be considered champion, the team with the best campaign in the first phase.

== Teams ==
Listed are the confirmed teams.

- Brazil
- Canada
- Mexico
- Netherlands

== Group stage ==
All times are local

=== Group A ===
Team	Pld	W	D	L	GF	GA	GD	Pts
Canada	3	2	1	0	6	0	+6	7
Brazil	3	2	1	0	6	2	+4	7
Netherlands	3	1	0	2	5	9	−4	3
Mexico	3	0	0	3	1	7	−6	0

9 December 2010
19:45

Canada	5–0	Netherlands
Sinclair 16', 74'; Bélanger 52'; Matheson 55', 67'	Report

Estádio do Pacaembu
Referee: Edilar Maria Ferreira (Brazil)

9 December 2010
22:00

Brazil	3–0	Mexico
Cristiane 21'; Marta 57', 61'	Report

Estádio do Pacaembu
Referee: Regildenia de Holanda Moura (Brazil)

12 December 2010
16:00

Brazil	3–2	Netherlands
Marta 9', 66'; Gabriela 90+3'	Report	van de Ven 30' e Ridder 59'

Estádio do Pacaembu
Referee: Flamarion David Volpe (Brazil)

12 December 2010
18:00

Canada	1–0	Mexico
Sinclair 22'	Report

Estádio do Pacaembu
Referee: Ulisses Antonio Zampieri(Brazil)

15 December 2010
19:45

Mexico	1–3	Netherlands
Worbis 47'	Report	van de Ven 9' van de Heiligenberg 63'; Smit 89'

Estádio do Pacaembu
Referee: Katiucia da Mota Lima(Brazil)

15 December 2010
22:00

Brazil	0–0	Canada
	Report

Estádio do Pacaembu
Referee: Wander Escardine(Brazil)

== Knockout stage ==
=== Third place match ===
19 December 2010
15:00

Netherlands	2–1	Mexico
van de Ven 61'; Spitse 85'	Report	Rangel 66'

Estádio do Pacaembu
Referee: Édila Maia Ferreira (Brazil)

=== Final ===
19 December 2010
17:00

Brazil	2–2	Canada
Marta 54', 72' (pen.)	Report	Bélanger 42'; Sinclair 82'

Estádio do Pacaembu
Referee: Katiucia da Mota Lima (Brazil)

== Final results ==
2010 Torneio Internacional Cidade de São Paulo Champions

Canada First
title

== Goalscorers ==
6 goals

- (Brazil) Marta

4 goals

- (Canada) Christine Sinclair

2 goals

- (Canada) Diana Matheson
- (Canada) Josée Bélanger
- (Mexico) Guadalupe Worbis
- (Netherlands) Kirsten van de Ven

1 goal

- (Brazil) Gabriela
- (Brazil) Cristiane
- (Mexico) Nayeli Rangel
- (Netherlands) Sylvia Smit
- (Netherlands) Claudia van den Heiligenberg
- (Netherlands) Chantal de Ridder
- (Netherlands) Sherida Spitse
