= 2013 International Women's Football Tournament of Brasília =

2013 Torneio Internacional de Brasília de Futebol Feminino
Torneio Internacional de Brasília

Tournament details
- Host country: Brazil
- City: Brasília
- Dates: 12–22 December
- Teams: 4 (from 3 confederations)
- Venue: 1 (in 1 host city)

Final positions
- Champions: Brazil (4th title)
- Runners-up: Chile
- Third place: Canada
- Fourth place: Scotland

Tournament statistics
- Top scorer(s): (Brazil) Debinha (Brazil) Marta (3 goals each)

The 2013 Torneio Internacional de Brasília de Futebol Feminino (also known as the 2013 International Tournament of Brasilia) was the fifth edition of the Torneio Internacional de Futebol Feminino, an invitational women's football tournament held every December in Brazil. It began on 12 December and ended on 22 December 2013. The tournament had previously been held in São Paulo but was moved to Brasília in 2013 at the instigation of the Brazilian Football Confederation (CBF).

== Format ==
In the first phase, the four teams play each other within the group in a single round. The two teams with the most points earned in the respective group, qualify for the next phase.

In the final stage, the first and second teams placed in the Group contest the final. Should the match ends in a tie, the team with the best record in the first phase is declared the winner.

The third and fourth teams placed in the group contest the third place play-off. Should the match ends in a tie, the team with the best record in the first phase is declared the winner.

== Venues ==
All matches took place at Estádio Nacional Mané Garrincha in Brasília.

2013 International Women's Football Tournament of Brasília is located in Brazil	Brasília, DF
Estádio Nacional Mané Garrincha; Capacity: 68,009

== Teams ==
Listed are the confirmed teams.

- Brazil
- Canada
- Scotland
- Chile

== Group stage ==
All times are local (UTC−02:00)

Team	Pld	W	D	L	GF	GA	GD	Pts
Brazil	3	2	1	0	5	1	+4	7
Chile	3	2	0	1	5	5	0	6
Canada	3	1	1	1	2	1	+1	4
Scotland	3	0	0	3	4	9	−5	0

12 December 2013
19:30

Scotland	0–2	Canada
	Report	Leon 8'; Sinclair 57'

Estádio Nacional Mané Garrincha
Referee: Wales Martins (Brazil)

12 December 2013
21:50

Brazil	2–0	Chile
Marta 10'; Thaisa 32'	Report

Estádio Nacional Mané Garrincha
Referee: Rodrigo Raposo (Brazil)

15 December 2013
16:00

Scotland	1–3	Brazil
Lauder 74'	Report	Marta 26'; Debinha 34', 48'

Estádio Nacional Mané Garrincha
Referee: Ademário Neves (Brazil)

15 December 2013
18:00

Chile	1–0	Canada
Aedo 38'	Report

Estádio Nacional Mané Garrincha
Referee: Rogério Bueno (Brazil)

18 December 2013
19:30

Chile	4–3	Scotland
Rojas 20'; Lara 58'; Araya 72'; Sáez 77'	Report (en); Report (pt)	J. Ross 24'; Murray 40'; Crilly 82'

Estádio Nacional Mané Garrincha
Referee: Rafael Diniz (Brazil)

18 December 2013
21:50

Brazil	0–0	Canada
	Report

Estádio Nacional Mané Garrincha
Referee: Vanderlei Soares de Macedo (Brazil)

== Knockout stage ==
=== Third place match ===
22 December 2013
13:45

Canada	1–0	Scotland
Schmidt 83'

Estádio Nacional Mané Garrincha
Referee: Rafael Diniz (Brazil)

=== Final ===
22 December 2013
16:00

Brazil	5–0	Chile
Formiga 8'; Marta 41'; Darlene 56'; Cristiane 76'; Debinha 85'	Report

Estádio Nacional Mané Garrincha
Referee: Rodrigo Raposo (Brazil)

== Final results ==
2013 Torneio Internacional Cidade de Brasília Champions
(Brazil)
Brazil
Fourth title

== Goalscorers ==
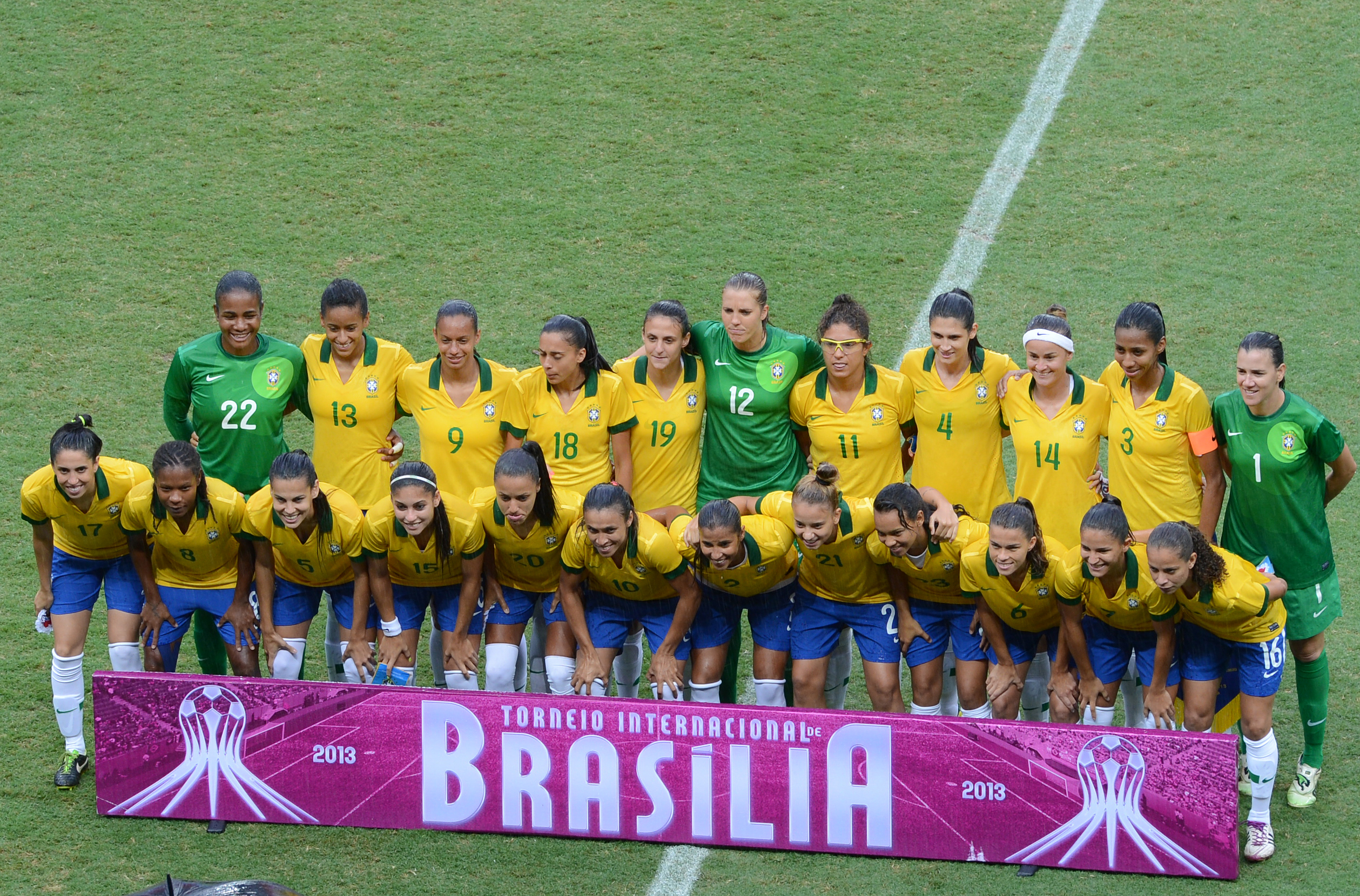
The victorious Brazilian squad

3 goals

- (Brazil) Debinha
- (Brazil) Marta

1 goal

- (Brazil) Cristiane
- (Brazil) Darlene
- (Brazil) Formiga
- (Brazil) Thaisa
- (Canada) Adriana Leon
- (Canada) Sophie Schmidt
- (Canada) Christine Sinclair
- (Chile) Yanara Aedo
- (Chile) Fernanda Araya
- (Chile) Francisca Lara
- (Chile) Maria Jose Rojas
- (Chile) Camila Sáez
- (Scotland) Sarah Crilly
- (Scotland) Hayley Lauder
- (Scotland) Christie Murray
- (Scotland) Jane Ross
