= Line Røddik Hansen =

Danish footballer (born 1988)

Line Røddik
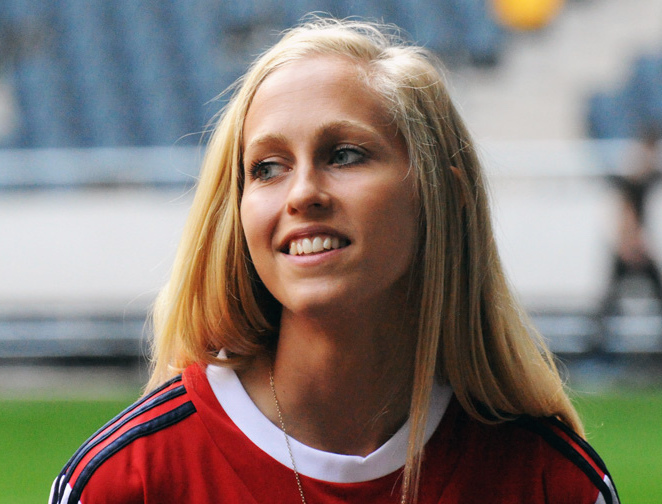
- Røddik in May 2013

Personal information
- Full name: Line Røddik Hansen
- Date of birth: 31 January 1988 (age 38)
- Place of birth: Copenhagen, Denmark
- Height: 1.76 m (5 ft 9 1/2 in)
- Position: Defender

Youth career
- BK Skjold

Senior career*
Years	Team	Apps	(Gls)
- Skovlunde IF
2007–2009	Brøndby IF	58	(5)
2010–2014	Tyresö FF	85	(8)
2014–2015	FC Rosengård	17	(0)
2016	Lyon	4	(0)
2016–2018	Barcelona	23	(1)
2018–2019	Ajax	8	(2)
2019–2020	FC Nordsjælland	18	(1)

International career^{‡}
2006–2017	Denmark	132	(13)
Medal record
Women's football
Representing Denmark
UEFA Women's Championship
Silver medal – second place	2017 Netherlands	Team
- * Club domestic league appearances and goals ‡ National team caps and goals as of 5 August 2017

Line Røddik Hansen (born 31 January 1988) is a Danish former footballer who played as a defender for Danish club FC Nordsjælland and the Denmark women's national team. She previously played for French club Lyon and Spanish club FC Barcelona, as well as Tyresö FF and FC Rosengård of the Swedish Damallsvenskan. She accrued 132 caps for the Denmark women's national football team between her debut in February 2006 and her retirement in December 2020.

== Club career ==
After joining Brøndby IF in 2007 Røddik Hansen won the Danish championship in her first season with the club. She was named club Player of the Year in 2008. She scored seven goals for Brøndby in a total of 78 appearances across all competitions.

Copenhagen-born Røddik Hansen left Brøndby IF for newly promoted Damallsvenskan club Tyresö FF ahead of the 2010 season, rejecting a competing offer from the American Women's Professional Soccer (WPS). She spent three seasons playing at left-back, before moving inside to centre back when the Swedish club signed Sara Thunebro in 2013.

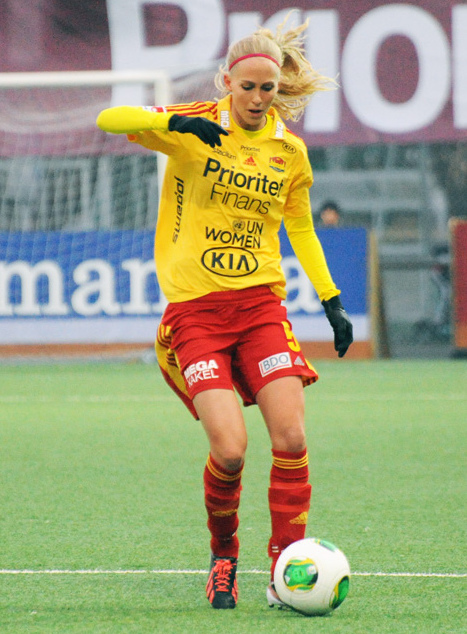
Playing for Tyresö in April 2013

Tyresö dramatically won the Damallsvenskan title for the first time in the 2012 season and Røddik Hansen collected her first league winner's medal. She played in Tyresö's 4–3 defeat by Wolfsburg in the 2014 UEFA Women's Champions League Final.

Tyresö suffered a financial implosion in 2014 and withdrew from the 2014 Damallsvenskan season, expunging all their results and making all their players free agents. The Stockholm County Administrative Board published the players' salaries, showing Røddik Hansen was one of the lower paid players, at SEK 25 000 per month.

In July 2014, Røddik Hansen signed a two-and-a-half-year contract with reigning Damallsvenskan champions, FC Rosengård, of Malmö. She transferred to French champions Lyon in January 2016. She was cup-tied for Lyon's win in the 2016 UEFA Women's Champions League Final. In July 2016 Røddik Hansen signed for FC Barcelona.

Røddik Hansen spent the final year of her career playing for Danish club FC Nordsjælland. She announced her retirement from football in an Instagram post in December 2020.

== International career ==
On 25 February 2006 Røddik Hansen made her senior Denmark debut, playing the second half of a 3–2 friendly win in Switzerland.

She was the youngest member of the Danish squad at the 2007 FIFA Women's World Cup in China at the age of 19 but did not appear in any matches. At UEFA Women's Euro 2009 in Finland Røddik Hansen played in all three group games as Denmark made a first round exit.

In 2010, she was named Danish Football Player of the Year.

The 2013 Algarve Cup match against Germany marked Røddik Hansen's 75th international cap. She was named in national coach Kenneth Heiner-Møller's squad for UEFA Women's Euro 2013. She was also named in national coach Nils Nielsen's squad for UEFA Women's Euro 2017 where she was an integral part of Denmark achieving second place.

== Honours ==
Brøndby IF

- Elitedivisionen: Winner 2007, 2008
- Danish Women's Cup: Winner 2007

Tyresö FF

- Damallsvenskan: Winner 2012

FC Rosengård

- Damallsvenskan: Winner 2014, 2015

FC Barcelona

- Copa de la Reina de Fútbol: Winner 2017, 2018
- Copa Catalunya: Winner 2016, 2017

== Style of play ==
Upon joining Barcelona, Røddik Hansen said that she liked the team's possession-based tactics: "I play both at centre back and left back, and I think I’m good at playing the ball out of defence."

== Personal life ==
Røddik Hansen graduated from the Swedish School of Sport and Health Sciences in June 2013, with a qualification in sports coaching.

== See also ==
- List of women's footballers with 100 or more international caps
