= 2009 International Women's Football Tournament of City of São Paulo =

2009 Torneio Internacional Cidade de São Paulo de Futebol Feminino
Tournament details
- Host country: Brazil
- Dates: 9–20 December
- Teams: 4 (from 3 confederations)
- Venue: 1 (in 1 host city)

Final positions
- Champions: Brazil (1st title)
- Runners-up: Mexico
- Third place: China
- Fourth place: Chile

Tournament statistics
- Matches played: 8
- Goals scored: 31 (3.88 per match)
- Top scorer(s): (Brazil) Marta (7 goals)

The 2009 Torneio Internacional Cidade de São Paulo was the first edition of the Torneio Internacional Cidade de São Paulo de Futebol Feminino, an invitational women's football tournament held annually in Brazil. It began on 9 December and ended on 20 December 2009.

== Format ==
The four invited teams played each other team once in the first phase of the tournament. The two teams with the most points earned played eachother again for finals with the remaining two teams playing for third place. If the matches in the second phase end in a tie, the record from the first phase of the tournament is used for tiebreakers.

== Teams ==
Listed are the confirmed teams.

- Brazil
- Chile
- China
- Mexico

== Group stage ==
All times are local

=== Group A ===
Team	Pld	W	D	L	GF	GA	GD	Pts
Brazil	3	3	0	0	9	3	+6	9
Mexico	3	1	0	2	8	6	+2	3
China	3	1	0	2	3	4	−1	3
Chile	3	1	0	2	2	9	−7	3

9 December 2009
19:30

China	3–0	Mexico
Liu Sa 12'; Han Duan 37'; Ma Jun 76'	Report

Estádio do Pacaembu
Referee: Marcelo Aparecido Ribeiro de Souza (Brazil)

9 December 2009
18:00

Brazil	3–1	Chile
Cristiane 32', 76'; Marta 37'	Report	Moreno 65'

Estádio do Pacaembu
Referee: Luis Flávio de Oliveira (Brazil)

13 December 2009
15:30

China	0–1	Chile
	Report	Mancilla 17'

Estádio do Pacaembu
Referee: Thiago Duarte Peixoto(Brazil)

13 December 2009
18:00

Brazil	3–2	Mexico
Marta 3'; Érika 6'; Cristiane 68'	Report	Ocampo 29'; Garza 72'

Estádio do Pacaembu
Referee: Robério Pereira Pires(Brazil)

16 December 2009
19:30

Chile	0–6	Mexico
	Report	Diaz 4'; Cuellar 16', 56'; Worbis 24', 28'; Mora 89'

Estádio do Pacaembu
Referee: Edilar Maria Ferreira(Brazil)

16 December 2009
21:50

Brazil	3–0	China
Marta 42', 88'; Grazi 75'	Report

Estádio do Pacaembu
Referee: Philippe Lombard(Brazil)

== Knockout stage ==
=== Third place match ===
20 December 2009
13:30

China	2–0	Chile
Ma Xiaoxu 22', 77'	Report

Estádio do Pacaembu
Referee: Edilar Maria Ferreira (Brazil)

=== Final ===
20 December 2009
16:00

Brazil	5–2	Mexico
Aline Pellegrino 22'; Marta 34', 59', 73'; Érika 54'	Report	Garza 11'; Rangel 70'

Estádio do Pacaembu
Referee: Sálvio Spinola (Brazil)

== Final results ==
2009 Torneio Internacional Cidade de São Paulo Champions
(Brazil)
Brazil
First title

== Goalscorers ==
7 goals

- (Brazil) Marta

3 goals

- (Brazil) Cristiane

2 goals

- (Brazil) Fabiana
- (Brazil) Érika
- (China) Ma Xiaoxu
- (Mexico) Dinora Garza
- (Mexico) Guadalupe "Lupita" Worbis
- (Mexico) Renae Cuellar
