= International Women's Football Tournament =

Annual global invitational tournament for national teams in women's association football

- Founded: 2009
- Region: Brazil
- Teams: 4
- Current champions: Brazil (8th title)
- Most championships: Brazil (8 titles)
- Broadcaster(s): Band, BandSports
- 2021 International Women's Football Tournament of Manaus

The Torneio Internacional de Futebol Feminino (English: International Women's Football Tournament) is an annual global invitational tournament for national teams in women's association football. Held every December in Brazil since 2009, the first four editions took place in São Paulo and Brasília hosted the 2013 and 2014 competitions. The 2015 edition will be hosted by Natal. Initially, it was organized by the Municipal Prefecture of São Paulo and the Federação Paulista de Futebol (FPF). Three teams are invited to take part alongside Brazil. All matches in a particular tournament are staged at a single venue: Estádio do Pacaembu, in São Paulo, Estádio Nacional Mané Garrincha in Brasília and Arena das Dunas in Natal. In 2016, the tournament was moved to Manaus.

In September 2017, competition organizers announced that the 2017 tournament would be cancelled and the tournament would switch to a bi-yearly format beginning in 2018. These plans fell through and no tournament was played in 2018.

In 2019, due to increased interest in Women's football surrounding the 2019 FIFA Women's World Cup, it was announced that the tournament would return for 2019 as the Torneio UBER Internacional de Futebol Feminino, to be played from August 29 to September 1.

The tournament has been won on eight occasions by the hosts and once each by Canada and Chile.

== Results ==
Year	Host	Final			Third Place Match		
Year	Host	Winner	Score	Runner-up	Third Place	Score	Fourth Place
2009	(Brazil); São Paulo	Brazil	5–2	Mexico	China	2–0	Chile
2010	(Brazil); São Paulo	Canada	2–2 (b.r.)	Brazil	Netherlands	2–1	Mexico
2011	(Brazil); São Paulo	Brazil	2–1	Denmark	Italy	3–2	Chile
2012	(Brazil); São Paulo	Brazil	2–2 (b.r.)	Denmark	Mexico	2–0	Portugal
2013	(Brazil); Brasília	Brazil	5–0	Chile	Canada	1–0	Scotland
2014	(Brazil); Brasília	Brazil	0–0 (b.r.)	United States	China	0–0 (b.r.)	Argentina
2015	(Brazil); Natal	Brazil	3–1	Canada	Mexico	2–1	Trinidad and Tobago
2016	(Brazil); Manaus	Brazil	5–3	Italy	Russia	1–0	Costa Rica
2019	(Brazil); São Paulo	Chile	0–0 (5–4 p.)	Brazil	Costa Rica	3–1	Argentina
2021	(Brazil); Manaus	Brazil	Round-robin	Chile	Venezuela	Round-robin	India

== Results by nation ==
Team	Titles	Runners-up	Third place	Fourth place	Total top four
Brazil	8 (2009, 2011, 2012, 2013, 2014, 2015, 2016, 2021)	2 (2010, 2019)	—	—	10
Chile	1 (2019)	2 (2013, 2021)	—	2 (2009, 2011)	5
Canada	1 (2010)	1 (2015)	1 (2013)	—	3
Denmark	—	2 (2011, 2012)	—	—	2
Mexico	—	1 (2009)	2 (2012, 2015)	1 (2010)	4
Italy	—	1 (2016)	1 (2011)	—	2
United States	—	1 (2014)	—	—	1
China	—	—	2 (2009, 2014)	—	2
Costa Rica	—	—	1 (2019)	1 (2016)	2
Netherlands	—	—	1 (2010)	—	1
Russia	—	—	1 (2016)	—	1
Venezuela	—	—	1 (2021)	—	1
Argentina	—	—	—	2 (2014, 2019)	2
India	—	—	—	1 (2021)	1
Portugal	—	—	—	1 (2012)	1
Scotland	—	—	—	1 (2013)	1
Trinidad and Tobago	—	—	—	1 (2015)	1

== Participating nations ==
Team	2009	2010	2011	2012	2013	2014	2015	2016	2019	2021	Years
Argentina	–	–	–	–	–	4th	–	–	4th	–	2
Brazil	1st	2nd	1st	1st	1st	1st	1st	1st	2nd	1st	10
Canada	–	1st	–	–	3rd	–	2nd	–	–	–	3
Chile	4th	–	4th	–	2nd	–	–	–	1st	2nd	5
China	3rd	–	–	–	–	3rd	–	–	–	–	2
Costa Rica	–	–	–	–	–	–	–	4th	3rd	—	2
Denmark	–	–	2nd	2nd	–	–	–	–	–	–	2
India	–	–	–	–	–	–	–	–	–	4th	1
Italy	–	–	3rd	–	–	–	–	2nd	–	–	2
Mexico	2nd	4th	–	3rd	–	–	3rd	–	–	–	4
Netherlands	–	3rd	–	–	–	–	–	–	–	–	1
Portugal	–	–	–	4th	–	–	–	–	–	–	1
Russia	–	–	–	–	–	–	–	3rd	–	–	1
Scotland	–	–	–	–	4th	–	–	–	–	–	1
Trinidad and Tobago	–	–	–	–	–	–	4th	–	–	–	1
United States	–	–	–	–	–	2nd	–	–	–	–	1
Venezuela	–	–	–	–	–	–	–	–	–	3rd	1
Total (17 teams)	4	4	4	4	4	4	4	4	4	4	

== General statistics ==
As of 2 December 2021

Rank	Team	Part	Pld	W	D	L	GF	GA	Dif	Pts
1	Brazil	8	32	25	5	2	103	27	+76	80
2	Canada	3	12	6	3	3	20	8	+12	21
3	Mexico	4	16	5	0	11	21	37	−16	15
4	Italy	2	8	4	1	3	22	17	+5	13
5	Denmark	2	8	3	3	2	16	8	+8	12
6	China	2	8	3	2	3	13	9	+4	15
7	Chile	3	12	3	0	9	9	38	−29	9
8	Netherlands	1	4	2	0	2	7	10	−3	6
9	Russia	1	4	2	0	2	4	8	−4	6
10	United States	1	3	1	2	1	10	4	+6	5
11	Portugal	1	4	1	1	2	1	6	−5	4
12	Venezuela	1	3	1	0	2	3	6	−3	3
13	Argentina	2	6	0	1	5	1	25	−24	1
14	Scotland	1	4	0	0	4	4	10	−6	0
15	India	1	3	0	0	3	2	11	−9	0
16	Costa Rica	1	4	0	0	4	1	13	−12	0
17	Trinidad and Tobago	1	4	0	0	4	1	20	−19	0

== Top scorers by year ==
Year	Top scorer(s)	Goals
2009	(Brazil) Marta	7
2010	(Brazil) Marta	6
2011	(Brazil) Érika	4
2012	(Brazil) Fabiana (Denmark) Line Røddik Hansen (Denmark) Johanna Rasmussen (Mexico) Sofia Huerta (Note: She switched her international allegiance into United States in 2017.)	2
2013	(Brazil) Debinha (Brazil) Marta	3
2014	(United States) Carli Lloyd	5
2015	(Brazil) Marta	7
2016	(Brazil) Bia Zaneratto	5
2019	(Costa Rica) Priscila Chinchilla	2
2021	(Brazil) Kerolin	4

== See also ==
- International competitions in women's association football
- FIFA Women's World Cup
- Women's Olympic Football Tournament
- Cyprus Women's Cup
- SheBelieves Cup
- Turkish Women's Cup
