= List of international goals scored by Christine Sinclair =

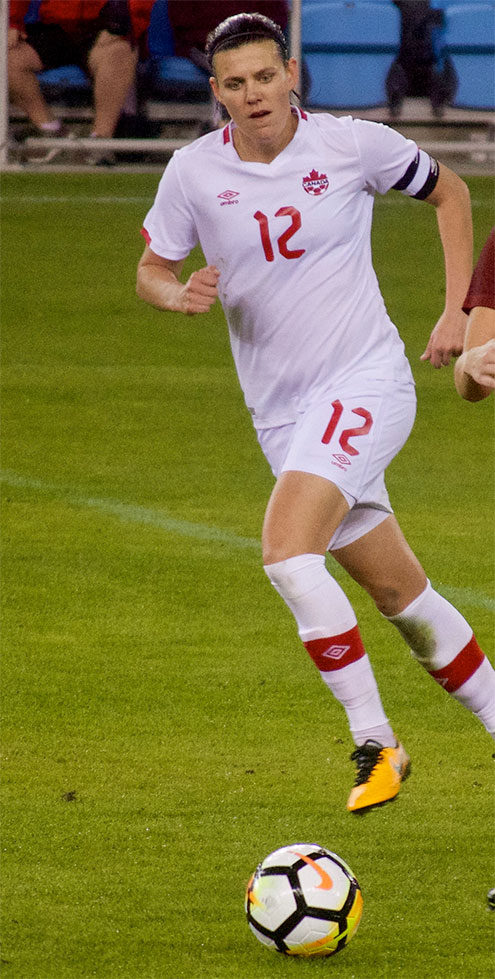
Christine Sinclair playing for the Canada women's national soccer team in San Jose, California on November 12, 2017

Christine Sinclair is a former professional soccer player who played as a striker for the Canada women's national soccer team from 2000 to 2023. On October 23, 2023, she announced her retirement from the Canada women's team, her 190 goals in 331 matches ranked first in most career international goals scored by a female or male soccer player worldwide ahead of Abby Wambach's 184 goals, who Sinclair equalled and passed on January 29, 2020. She surpassed Mia Hamm's 158 goals in February 2016. The all-time leading goal scorer and most-capped player of the Canadian national team, Sinclair was also its captain.

Sinclair made her debut for the senior team at age 16 at the 2000 Algarve Cup, where she was the tournament's leading scorer with three goals. She scored seven goals for Canada at the 2002 CONCACAF Women's Gold Cup, which tied for the tournament's lead. Her three goals at the 2003 FIFA Women's World Cup helped lead Canada to the team's first fourth-place finish (a team best at the time since the inaugural 1991 FIFA Women's World Cup).

At the 2012 London Olympics, Sinclair broke the record of most goals scored in Olympic women's soccer and was awarded the Golden Boot after scoring two goals against South Africa, one against Great Britain, and a hat-trick against the United States in the semifinal. Her performance earned her the honour of Canada's flag bearer in the closing ceremony as well as the Queen Elizabeth II Diamond Jubilee Medal. Sinclair was appointed an Officer of the Order of Canada in 2017, and FIFA honored her for breaking the international goalscoring record with a special award at The Best FIFA Football Awards in December 2020.

== International goals ==
Key (expand for notes on "international goals" and sorting)
Location	Geographic location of the venue where the competition occurred Sorted by country name first, then by city name
Lineup	Start – played entire match on minute (off player) – substituted on at the minute indicated, and player was substituted off at the same time off minute (on player) – substituted off at the minute indicated, and player was substituted on at the same time (c) – captain Sorted by minutes played
Goal in match	Goal of total goals by the player in the match Sorted by total goals followed by goal number
#	NumberOfGoals.goalNumber scored by the player in the match (alternate notation to Goal in match)
Min	The minute in the match the goal was scored. For list that include caps, blank indicates played in the match but did not score a goal.
Assist/pass	The ball was passed by the player, which assisted in scoring the goal. This column depends on the availability and source of this information.
penalty or pk	Goal scored on penalty-kick which was awarded due to foul by opponent. (Goals scored in penalty-shoot-out, at the end of a tied match after extra-time, are not included.)
Score	The match score after the goal was scored. Sorted by goal difference, then by goal scored by the player's team
Result	The final score. Sorted by goal difference in the match, then by goal difference in penalty-shoot-out if it is taken, followed by goal scored by the player's team in the match, then by goal scored in the penalty-shoot-out. For matches with identical final scores, match ending in extra-time without penalty-shoot-out is a tougher match, therefore precede matches that ended in regulation
aet	The score at the end of extra-time; the match was tied at the end of 90' regulation
pso	Penalty-shoot-out score shown in parentheses; the match was tied at the end of extra-time
	Green background color – exhibition or closed door international friendly match
	Yellow background color – match at an invitational tournament
	Red background color – Olympic women's football qualification match
	Light-blue background color – FIFA women's world cup qualification match
	Orange background color – Continental Games or regional tournament
	Pink background color – Olympic women's football tournament
	Blue background color – FIFA women's world cup final tournament
NOTE on background colors: Continental Games or regional tournament are sometimes also qualifier for World Cup or Olympics; information depends on the source such as the player's federation. NOTE: some keys may not apply for a particular football player

Goal	Cap	Date	Venue	Opponent	Score	Result	Competition
1	2	March 14, 2000	Estádio Municipal de Albufeira, Albufeira, Portugal	Norway	1–0	1–2	2000 Algarve Cup
2	4	March 18, 2000	Estádio Municipal de Lagos, Lagos, Portugal	Denmark	1–0	3–2	2000 Algarve Cup
3	4	March 18, 2000	Estádio Municipal de Lagos, Lagos, Portugal	Denmark	3–2	3–2	2000 Algarve Cup
4	7	May 31, 2000	AIS Athletics Stadium, Canberra, Australia	New Zealand	2–1	2–1	2000 Pacific Cup
5	8	June 2, 2000	Sydney Football Stadium, Sydney, Australia	United States	1–9	1–9	2000 Pacific Cup
6	9	June 4, 2000	Campbelltown Stadium, Campbelltown, Australia	Australia	1–0	2–0	2000 Pacific Cup
7	10	June 8, 2000	Breakers Stadium, Newcastle, Australia	China	1–0	2–2	2000 Pacific Cup
8	10	June 8, 2000	Breakers Stadium, Newcastle, Australia	China	2–0	2–2	2000 Pacific Cup
9	11	June 10, 2000	Hunter Athletics Stadium, Newcastle, Australia	Japan	1–0	5–1	2000 Pacific Cup
10	12	June 24, 2000	Foxboro Stadium, Foxborough, United States	Mexico	1–1	4–3	2000 CONCACAF Women's Gold Cup
11	12	June 24, 2000	Foxboro Stadium, Foxborough, United States	Mexico	3–2	4–3	2000 CONCACAF Women's Gold Cup
12	14	June 28, 2000	Papa John's Cardinal Stadium, Louisville, United States	Guatemala	1–0	12–0	2000 CONCACAF Women's Gold Cup
13	14	June 28, 2000	Papa John's Cardinal Stadium, Louisville, United States	Guatemala	8–0	12–0	2000 CONCACAF Women's Gold Cup
14	14	June 28, 2000	Papa John's Cardinal Stadium, Louisville, United States	Guatemala	10–0	12–0	2000 CONCACAF Women's Gold Cup
15	18	November 11, 2000	Columbus Crew Stadium, Columbus, United States	United States	1–0	3–1	Friendly
16	19	February 10, 2001	Prince Moulay Abdellah Stadium, Rabat, Morocco	Morocco	2–0	4–0	
17	21	March 11, 2001	Estádio Municipal de Lagos, Lagos, Portugal	United States	2–0	3–0	2001 Algarve Cup
18	22	March 13, 2001	Estadio Dr. Francisco Vieira, Silves, Portugal	Sweden	1–3	2–5	2001 Algarve Cup
19	22	March 13, 2001	Estadio Dr. Francisco Vieira, Silves, Portugal	Sweden	2–4	2–5	2001 Algarve Cup
20	24	March 17, 2001	Estádio de São Luís, Faro, Portugal	China	1–0	1–5	2001 Algarve Cup
21	29	June 30, 2001	Varsity Stadium, Toronto, Ontario, Canada	United States	2–2	2–2	Friendly
22	32	March 3, 2002	Estádio Capitão Josino da Costa, Lagoa, Portugal	Wales	1–0	4–0	2002 Algarve Cup
23	32	March 3, 2002	Estádio Capitão Josino da Costa, Lagoa, Portugal	Wales	3–0	4–0	2002 Algarve Cup
24	33	March 5, 2002	Estadio Dr. Francisco Vieira, Silves, Portugal	Portugal	3–0	7–1	2002 Algarve Cup
25	33	March 5, 2002	Estadio Dr. Francisco Vieira, Silves, Portugal	Portugal	7–1	7–1	2002 Algarve Cup
26	36	October 30, 2002	Centennial Stadium, Victoria, BC, Canada	Haiti	3–1	11–1	2002 CONCACAF Women's Gold Cup
27	36	October 30, 2002	Centennial Stadium, Victoria, BC, Canada	Haiti	6–1	11–1	2002 CONCACAF Women's Gold Cup
28	36	October 30, 2002	Centennial Stadium, Victoria, BC, Canada	Haiti	9–1	11–1	2002 CONCACAF Women's Gold Cup
29	36	October 30, 2002	Centennial Stadium, Victoria, BC, Canada	Haiti	11–1	11–1	2002 CONCACAF Women's Gold Cup
30	37	November 1, 2002	Centennial Stadium, Victoria, BC, Canada	Jamaica	1–0	9–0	2002 CONCACAF Women's Gold Cup
31	37	November 1, 2002	Centennial Stadium, Victoria, BC, Canada	Jamaica	7–0	9–0	2002 CONCACAF Women's Gold Cup
32	38	November 3, 2002	Centennial Stadium, Victoria, BC, Canada	Costa Rica	3–0	3–0	2002 CONCACAF Women's Gold Cup
33	44	March 20, 2003	Complexo Desportivo Arsénio Catuna, Guia, Portugal	Greece	1–0	7–1	2003 Algarve Cup
34	44	March 20, 2003	Complexo Desportivo Arsénio Catuna, Guia, Portugal	Greece	3–0	7–1	2003 Algarve Cup
35	44	March 20, 2003	Complexo Desportivo Arsénio Catuna, Guia, Portugal	Greece	7–0	7–1	2003 Algarve Cup
36	45	April 26, 2003	RFK Stadium, Washington, D.C., United States	United States	1–0	1–6	Friendly
37	46	June 12, 2003	Estadio Armando "Kory" Leyson, Guasave, Mexico	Mexico	1–0	4–0	
38	47	June 15, 2003	Estadio Centenario, Los Mochis, Mexico	Mexico	2–0	3–0	
39	48	August 16, 2003	Memorial Stadium, Seattle, United States	Ghana	1–0	1–1	
40	49	August 31, 2003	Commonwealth Stadium, Edmonton, Alberta, Canada	Mexico	4–0	8–0	
41	52	September 20, 2003	Columbus Crew Stadium, Columbus, United States	Germany	1–0	1–4	2003 FIFA Women's World Cup
42	54	September 27, 2003	Gillette Stadium, Foxborough, United States	Japan	2–1	3–1	2003 FIFA Women's World Cup
43	57	October 11, 2003	Home Depot Center, Carson, United States	United States	1–1	1–3	2003 FIFA Women's World Cup
44	59	February 1, 2004	Shenzhen Stadium, Shenzhen, China	Sweden	1–3	1–3	2004 Four Nations Tournament
45	61	February 26, 2004	Estadio Eladio Rosabal Cordero, Heredia, Costa Rica	Jamaica	3–0	6–0	2004 CONCACAF Women's Olympic Qualifying Tournament
46	61	February 26, 2004	Estadio Eladio Rosabal Cordero, Heredia, Costa Rica	Jamaica	4–0	6–0	2004 CONCACAF Women's Olympic Qualifying Tournament
47	61	February 26, 2004	Estadio Eladio Rosabal Cordero, Heredia, Costa Rica	Jamaica	6–0	6–0	2004 CONCACAF Women's Olympic Qualifying Tournament
48	64	March 5, 2004	Estadio Eladio Rosabal Cordero, Heredia, Costa Rica	Costa Rica	1–0	4–0	2004 CONCACAF Women's Olympic Qualifying Tournament
49	64	March 5, 2004	Estadio Eladio Rosabal Cordero, Heredia, Costa Rica	Costa Rica	4–0	4–0	2004 CONCACAF Women's Olympic Qualifying Tournament
50	69	April 24, 2005	Friedrich-Ebert-Stadion, Hildesheim, Germany	Germany	2–3	2–3	Friendly
51	70	May 25, 2005	Brøndby Stadium, Brøndbyvester, Denmark	Denmark	1–3	4–3	Friendly
52	70	May 25, 2005	Brøndby Stadium, Brøndbyvester, Denmark	Denmark	4–3	4–3	Friendly
53	71	May 28, 2005	Råsunda Stadium, Solna, Sweden	Sweden	1–3	1–3	Friendly
54	74	February 23, 2006	Estadio Victoria, Aguascalientes, Mexico	Mexico	1–1	3–1	Friendly
55	74	February 23, 2006	Estadio Victoria, Aguascalientes, Mexico	Mexico	3–1	3–1	Friendly
56	79	July 18, 2006	National Sports Center, Blaine, United States	Sweden	3–1	4–2	Friendly
57	83	August 26, 2006	Stade Robert Diochon, Rouen, France	France	1–0	1–0	Friendly
58	84	August 29, 2006	Stade des Vertus, Saint-Aubin-sur-Scie, France	France	1–1	2–2	Friendly
59	85	October 28, 2006	Seoul World Cup Stadium, Seoul, South Korea	Italy	1–0	3–2	2006 Peace Queen Cup
60	85	October 28, 2006	Seoul World Cup Stadium, Seoul, South Korea	Italy	2–0	3–2	2006 Peace Queen Cup
61	86	October 30, 2006	Masan Stadium, Changwon, South Korea	South Korea	1–0	3–1	2006 Peace Queen Cup
62	86	October 30, 2006	Masan Stadium, Changwon, South Korea	South Korea	2–1	3–1	2006 Peace Queen Cup
63	86	October 30, 2006	Masan Stadium, Changwon, South Korea	South Korea	3–1	3–1	2006 Peace Queen Cup
64	87	November 1, 2006	Changwon Civic Stadium, Changwon, South Korea	Brazil	3–1	4–2	2006 Peace Queen Cup
65	89	November 22, 2006	Home Depot Center, Carson, United States	Jamaica	1–0	4–0	2006 CONCACAF Women's Gold Cup
66	89	November 22, 2006	Home Depot Center, Carson, United States	Jamaica	3–0	4–0	2006 CONCACAF Women's Gold Cup
67	91	May 3, 2007	Nanjing Olympic Sports Centre, Nanjing, China	China	1–0	1–3	Friendly
68	92	May 12, 2007	Pizza Hut Park, Frisco, United States	United States	2–4	2–6	Friendly
69	93	June 3, 2007	North Harbour Stadium, Auckland, New Zealand	New Zealand	1–0	3–0	Friendly
70	93	June 3, 2007	North Harbour Stadium, Auckland, New Zealand	New Zealand	3–0	3–0	Friendly
71	94	June 6, 2007	North Harbour Stadium, Auckland, New Zealand	New Zealand	2–0	5–0	Friendly
72	95	July 14, 2007	Miécimo da Silva Sports Complex, Rio de Janeiro, Brazil	Uruguay	1–0	7–0	2007 Pan American Games
73	95	July 14, 2007	Miécimo da Silva Sports Complex, Rio de Janeiro, Brazil	Uruguay	4–0	7–0	2007 Pan American Games
74	95	July 14, 2007	Miécimo da Silva Sports Complex, Rio de Janeiro, Brazil	Uruguay	6–0	7–0	2007 Pan American Games
75	97	July 18, 2007	Zico Football Center, Rio de Janeiro, Brazil	Jamaica	1–0	11–1	2007 Pan American Games
76	97	July 18, 2007	Zico Football Center, Rio de Janeiro, Brazil	Jamaica	5–0	11–1	2007 Pan American Games
77	97	July 18, 2007	Zico Football Center, Rio de Janeiro, Brazil	Jamaica	7–0	11–1	2007 Pan American Games
78	97	July 18, 2007	Zico Football Center, Rio de Janeiro, Brazil	Jamaica	10–0	11–1	2007 Pan American Games
79	99	July 26, 2007	Estádio do Maracanã, Rio de Janeiro, Brazil	Mexico	1–0	2–1	2007 Pan American Games
80	102	September 15, 2007	Hangzhou Dragon Stadium, Hangzhou, China	Ghana	1–0	4–0	2007 FIFA Women's World Cup
81	102	September 15, 2007	Hangzhou Dragon Stadium, Hangzhou, China	Ghana	3–0	4–0	2007 FIFA Women's World Cup
82	103	September 20, 2007	Chengdu Sports Centre, Chengdu, China	Australia	2–1	2–2	2007 FIFA Women's World Cup
83	108	March 7, 2008	GSZ Stadium, Larnaca, Cyprus	Japan	1–0	3–0	2008 Cyprus Cup
84	108	March 7, 2008	GSZ Stadium, Larnaca, Cyprus	Japan	2–0	3–0	2008 Cyprus Cup
85	108	March 7, 2008	GSZ Stadium, Larnaca, Cyprus	Japan	3–0	3–0	2008 Cyprus Cup
86	110	April 2, 2008	Estadio Olímpico Benito Juárez, Ciudad Juárez, Mexico	Trinidad and Tobago	6–0	6–0	2008 CONCACAF Women's Pre-Olympic Tournament
87	116	June 14, 2008	Suwon World Cup Stadium, Suwon, South Korea	Argentina	2–0	5–0	2008 Peace Queen Cup
88	116	June 14, 2008	Suwon World Cup Stadium, Suwon, South Korea	Argentina	3–0	5–0	2008 Peace Queen Cup
89	117	June 16, 2008	Suwon World Cup Stadium, Suwon, South Korea	South Korea	2–0	3–1	2008 Peace Queen Cup
90	117	June 16, 2008	Suwon World Cup Stadium, Suwon, South Korea	South Korea	3–0	3–1	2008 Peace Queen Cup
91	118	June 18, 2008	Suwon World Cup Stadium, Suwon, South Korea	New Zealand	1–0	2–0	2008 Peace Queen Cup
92	120	July 10, 2008	Qwest Field, Seattle, Washington, USA	Brazil	1–0	1–1	Friendly
93	121	July 26, 2008	Queenstown Stadium, Queenstown, Singapore	New Zealand	1–0	1–1	Friendly
94	123	August 9, 2008	Tianjin Olympic Center Stadium, Tianjin, China	China	1–0	1–1	2008 Summer Olympics
95	125	August 15, 2008	Shanghai Stadium, Shanghai, China	United States	1–1	1–2	2008 Summer Olympics
96	127	March 7, 2009	GSZ Stadium, Larnaca, Cyprus	Netherlands	1–0	2–1	2009 Cyprus Cup
97	127	March 7, 2009	GSZ Stadium, Larnaca, Cyprus	Netherlands	2–0	2–1	2009 Cyprus Cup
98	128	March 10, 2009	Ammochostos Stadium, Larnaca, Cyprus	Russia	1–0	2–0	2009 Cyprus Cup
99	129	March 12, 2009	GSP Stadium, Nicosia, Cyprus	England	1–0	1–3	2009 Cyprus Cup
100	133	February 20, 2010	Alpha Sports Centre, Larnaca, Cyprus	Poland	1–0	3–0	Friendly
101	134	February 24, 2010	Ammochostos Stadium, Larnaca, Cyprus	Switzerland	1–1	2–1	2010 Cyprus Women's Cup
102	140	September 30, 2010	BMO Field, Toronto, Ontario, Canada	China	3–1	3–1	Friendly
103	142	October 31, 2010	Estadio de Béisbol Beto Ávila, Cancún, Mexico	Guyana	2–0	8–0	2010 CONCACAF Women's Gold Cup
104	142	October 31, 2010	Estadio de Béisbol Beto Ávila, Cancún, Mexico	Guyana	4–0	8–0	2010 CONCACAF Women's Gold Cup
105	142	October 31, 2010	Estadio de Béisbol Beto Ávila, Cancún, Mexico	Guyana	5–0	8–0	2010 CONCACAF Women's Gold Cup
106	142	October 31, 2010	Estadio de Béisbol Beto Ávila, Cancún, Mexico	Guyana	6–0	8–0	2010 CONCACAF Women's Gold Cup
107	144	November 5, 2010	Estadio de Béisbol Beto Ávila, Cancún, Mexico	Costa Rica	3–0	4–0	2010 CONCACAF Women's Gold Cup
108	145	November 8, 2010	Estadio Andrés Quintana Roo, Cancún, Mexico	Mexico	1–0	1–0	2010 CONCACAF Women's Gold Cup
109	146	December 9, 2010	Pacaembu Stadium|Estádio do Pacaembu, São Paulo, Brazil	Netherlands	1–0	5–0	2010 International Women's Football Tournament
110	146	December 9, 2010	Pacaembu Stadium|Estádio do Pacaembu, São Paulo, Brazil	Netherlands	5–0	5–0	2010 International Women's Football Tournament
111	147	December 12, 2010	Estádio do Pacaembu, São Paulo, Brazil	Mexico	1–0	1–0	2010 International Women's Football Tournament
112	148	December 19, 2010	Estádio do Pacaembu, São Paulo, Brazil	Brazil	2–1	2–2	2010 International Women's Football Tournament
113	149	January 21, 2011	Yongchuan Stadium, Chongqing, China	China	2–2	3–2	2011 Four Nations Tournament
114	149	January 21, 2011	Yongchuan Stadium, Chongqing, China	China	3–2	3–2	2011 Four Nations Tournament
115	151	January 25, 2011	Yongchuan Stadium, Chongqing, China	Sweden	1–0	1–0	2011 Four Nations Tournament
116	154	March 7, 2011	GSP Stadium, Nicosia, Cyprus	England	1–0	2–0	2011 Cyprus Women's Cup
117	160	June 26, 2011	Olympiastadion, Berlin, Germany	Germany	1–2	1–2	2011 FIFA Women's World Cup
118	163	October 18, 2011	Estadio Omnilife, Zapopan, Mexico	Costa Rica	2–1	3–1	2011 Pan American Games
119	167	October 27, 2011	Estadio Omnilife, Zapopan, Mexico	Brazil	1–1	1–1	2011 Pan American Games
120	168	November 22, 2011	Grand Canyon University Soccer Field, Phoenix, United States	Sweden	2–1	2–1	Friendly
121	169	January 19, 2012	BC Place, Vancouver, BC, Canada	Haiti	2–0	6–0	2012 CONCACAF Women's Olympic Qualifying Tournament
122	169	January 19, 2012	BC Place, Vancouver, BC, Canada	Haiti	3–0	6–0	2012 CONCACAF Women's Olympic Qualifying Tournament
123	169	January 19, 2012	BC Place, Vancouver, BC, Canada	Haiti	4–0	6–0	2012 CONCACAF Women's Olympic Qualifying Tournament
124	169	January 19, 2012	BC Place, Vancouver, BC, Canada	Haiti	5–0	6–0	2012 CONCACAF Women's Olympic Qualifying Tournament
125	170	January 21, 2012	BC Place, Vancouver, BC, Canada	Cuba	1–0	2–0	2012 CONCACAF Women's Olympic Qualifying Tournament
126	171	January 23, 2012	BC Place, Vancouver, BC, Canada	Costa Rica	1–0	5–1	2012 CONCACAF Women's Olympic Qualifying Tournament
127	171	January 23, 2012	BC Place, Vancouver, BC, Canada	Costa Rica	4–0	5–1	2012 CONCACAF Women's Olympic Qualifying Tournament
128	172	January 27, 2012	BC Place, Vancouver, BC, Canada	Mexico	1–0	3–1	2012 CONCACAF Women's Olympic Qualifying Tournament
129	172	January 27, 2012	BC Place, Vancouver, BC, Canada	Mexico	3–1	3–1	2012 CONCACAF Women's Olympic Qualifying Tournament
130	174	February 28, 2012	GSZ Stadium, Larnaca, Cyprus	Scotland	4–1	5–1	2012 Cyprus Women's Cup
131	175	March 1, 2012	GSP Stadium, Nicosia, Cyprus	Italy	1–0	2–1	2012 Cyprus Women's Cup
132	178	March 24, 2012	Gillette Stadium, Foxborough, Massachusetts|Foxborough, United States	Brazil	1–0	2–1	Friendly
133	178	March 24, 2012	Gillette Stadium, Foxborough, Massachusetts|Foxborough, United States	Brazil	2–0	2–1	Friendly
134	180	May 30, 2012	Moncton Stadium, Moncton, New Brunswick, Canada	China	1–0	1–0	Friendly
135	182	July 9, 2012	Stade de Copet, Vevey, Switzerland	Colombia	1–0	1–0	Friendly
136	183	July 14, 2012	Stade du Lussy, Châtel-Saint-Denis, Switzerland	New Zealand	2–0	2–0	2012 Women's Cup
137	184	July 17, 2012	Stade St-Germain, Savièse, Switzerland	Brazil	1–1	1–2	2012 Women's Cup
138	186	July 28, 2012	City of Coventry Stadium, Coventry, England	South Africa	2–0	3–0	2012 Summer Olympics
139	186	July 28, 2012	City of Coventry Stadium, Coventry, England	South Africa	3–0	3–0	2012 Summer Olympics
140	188	August 3, 2012	City of Coventry Stadium, Coventry, England	Great Britain	2–0	2–0	2012 Summer Olympics
141	189	August 6, 2012	Old Trafford, Trafford, England	United States	1–0	3–4	2012 Summer Olympics
142	189	August 6, 2012	Old Trafford, Trafford, England	United States	2–1	3–4	2012 Summer Olympics
143	189	August 6, 2012	Old Trafford, Trafford, England	United States	3–2	3–4	2012 Summer Olympics
144	191	March 8, 2013	GSP Stadium, Nicosia, Cyprus	Finland	2–1	2–1	2013 Cyprus Women's Cup
145	192	March 11, 2013	GSP Stadium, Nicosia, Cyprus	Netherlands	1–0	1–0	2013 Cyprus Women's Cup
146	198	October 30, 2013	Commonwealth Stadium, Edmonton, Alberta, Canada	South Korea	1–0	3–0	Friendly
147	200	December 12, 2013	Estádio Nacional Mané Garrincha, Brasília, Brazil	Scotland	2–0	2–0	2013 International Women's Football Tournament
148	214	November 26, 2014	Drake Stadium, Los Angeles, United States	Sweden	1–1	1–1	Friendly
149	216	January 13, 2015	Bao'an Stadium, Shenzhen, China	Mexico	2–1	2–1	2015 Four Nations Tournament
150	217	January 15, 2015	Bao'an Stadium, Shenzhen, China	China	1–1	2–1	2015 Four Nations Tournament
151	217	January 15, 2015	Bao'an Stadium, Shenzhen, China	China	2–1	2–1	2015 Four Nations Tournament
152	218	March 4, 2015	GSP Stadium, Nicosia, Cyprus	Scotland	1–0	2–0	2015 Cyprus Women's Cup
153	219	March 6, 2015	GSZ Stadium, Larnaca, Cyprus	South Korea	1–0	1–0	2015 Cyprus Women's Cup
154	224	June 6, 2015	Commonwealth Stadium, Edmonton, Alberta, Canada	China	1–0	1–0	2015 FIFA Women's World Cup
155	228	June 27, 2015	BC Place, Vancouver, BC, Canada	England	1–2	1–2	2015 FIFA Women's World Cup
156	229	December 9, 2015	Arena das Dunas, Natal, Brazil	Mexico	1–0	3–0	2015 International Women's Football Tournament
157	229	December 9, 2015	Arena das Dunas, Natal, Brazil	Mexico	2–0	3–0	2015 International Women's Football Tournament
158	230	December 14, 2015	Arena das Dunas, Natal, Brazil	Trinidad and Tobago	4–0	4–0	2015 International Women's Football Tournament
159	234	February 14, 2016	BBVA Compass Stadium, Houston, United States	Trinidad and Tobago	3–0	6–0	2016 CONCACAF Women's Olympic Qualifying Championship
160	235	February 19, 2016	BBVA Compass Stadium, Houston, United States	Costa Rica	1–0	3–1	2016 CONCACAF Women's Olympic Qualifying Championship
161	235	February 19, 2016	BBVA Compass Stadium, Houston, United States	Costa Rica	2–0	3–1	2016 CONCACAF Women's Olympic Qualifying Championship
162	241	April 10, 2016	Jan Louwers Stadion, Eindhoven, Netherlands	Netherlands	1–0	2–1	Friendly
163	246	August 3, 2016	Arena Corinthians, São Paulo, Brazil	Australia	2–0	2–0	2016 Summer Olympics
164	247	August 6, 2016	Arena Corinthians, São Paulo, Brazil	Zimbabwe	2–0	3–1	2016 Summer Olympics
165	250	August 19, 2016	Arena Corinthians, São Paulo, Brazil	Brazil	2–0	2–1	2016 Summer Olympics
166	252	March 1, 2017	Estádio Municipal de Lagos, Lagos, Portugal	Denmark	1–0	1–0	2017 Algarve Cup
167	253	March 3, 2017	Estádio Algarve, São João da Venda, Portugal	Russia	2–0	2–1	2017 Algarve Cup
168	258	June 8, 2017	Investors Group Field, Winnipeg, Manitoba, Canada	Costa Rica	2–0	3–1	Friendly
169	262	November 28, 2017	Estadio Municipal de Marbella, Marbella, Spain	Norway	1–2	3–2	Friendly
170	264	March 2, 2018	Estádio Algarve, São João da Venda, Portugal	Russia	1–0	1–0	2018 Algarve Cup
171	265	March 5, 2018	Estádio Municipal de Lagos, Lagos, Portugal	South Korea	1–0	3–0	2018 Algarve Cup
172	265	March 5, 2018	Estádio Municipal de Lagos, Lagos, Portugal	South Korea	3–0	3–0	2018 Algarve Cup
173	268	June 10, 2018	Tim Hortons Field, Hamilton, Ontario, Canada	Germany	1–1	2–3	Friendly
174	270	October 8, 2018	H-E-B Park, Edinburg, Texas, United States	Cuba	10–0	12–0	2018 CONCACAF Women's Championship
175	271	October 11, 2018	H-E-B Park, Edinburg, Texas, United States	Costa Rica	3–0	3–1	2018 CONCACAF Women's Championship
176	272	October 14, 2018	Toyota Stadium, Frisco, Texas, United States	Panama	1–0	7–0	2018 CONCACAF Women's Championship
177	272	October 14, 2018	Toyota Stadium, Frisco, Texas, United States	Panama	3–0	7–0	2018 CONCACAF Women's Championship
178	275	January 22, 2019	La Manga Stadium, La Manga, Spain	Norway	1–0	1–0	Friendly
179	277	March 1, 2019	Estádio Municipal de Lagos, Lagos, Portugal	Scotland	1–0	1–0	2019 Algarve Cup
180	279	April 5, 2019	Academy Stadium, Manchester, England	England	1–0	1–0	Friendly
181	281	May 18, 2019	BMO Field, Toronto, Ontario, Canada	Mexico	2–0	3–0	Friendly
182	285	June 20, 2019	Stade Auguste-Delaune, Reims, France	Netherlands	1–1	1–2	2019 FIFA Women's World Cup
183	289	November 10, 2019	Yongchuan Sports Center, Chongqing, China	New Zealand	1–0	3–0	2019 Yongchuan International Tournament
184	290	January 29, 2020	H-E-B Park, Edinburg, Texas, United States	Saint Kitts and Nevis	1–0	11–0	2020 CONCACAF Women's Olympic Qualifying Championship
185	290	January 29, 2020	H-E-B Park, Edinburg, Texas, United States	Saint Kitts and Nevis	4–0	11–0	2020 CONCACAF Women's Olympic Qualifying Championship
186	291	February 4, 2020	H-E-B Park, Edinburg, Texas, United States	Mexico	1–0	2–0	2020 CONCACAF Women's Olympic Qualifying Championship
187	300	July 21, 2021	Sapporo Dome, Sapporo, Japan	Japan	1–0	1–1	2020 Summer Olympics
188	305	October 23, 2021	TD Place Stadium, Ottawa, Ontario, Canada	New Zealand	2–0	5–1	Friendly
189	310	April 11, 2022	Starlight Stadium, Langford, British Columbia, Canada	Nigeria	1–1	2–2	Friendly
190	311	July 5, 2022	Estadio BBVA, Guadalupe, Mexico	Trinidad and Tobago	1–0	6–0	2022 CONCACAF W Championship

== Hat-tricks ==
No.	Date	Venue	Opponent	Goals	Result	Competition	Ref.
1	28 June 2000	Papa John's Cardinal Stadium, Louisville, United States	Guatemala	3 – (9', 73', 76')	12–0	2000 CONCACAF Women's Gold Cup	
2	30 October 2002	Centennial Stadium, Victoria, BC, Canada	Haiti	4 – (16', 43', 71', 86')	11–1	2002 CONCACAF Women's Gold Cup	
3	20 March 2003	Complexo Desportivo Arsénio Catuna, Guia, Portugal	Greece	3 – (5', 38', 82')	7–1	2003 Algarve Cup	
4	26 February 2004	Estadio Eladio Rosabal Cordero, Heredia, Costa Rica	Jamaica	3 – (46', 61', 90+1')	6–0	2004 CONCACAF Women's Olympic Qualifying Tournament	
5	30 October 2006	Masan Stadium, Changwon, South Korea	South Korea	3 – (23', 49', 69')	3–1	2006 Peace Queen Cup	
6	14 July 2007	Miécimo da Silva Sports Complex, Rio de Janeiro, Brazil	Uruguay	3 – (7', 70', 84')	7–0	2007 Pan American Games	
7	18 July 2007	Zico Football Center, Rio de Janeiro, Brazil	Jamaica	4 – (17', 24', 39', 45+1')	11–1	2007 Pan American Games	
8	7 March 2008	GSZ Stadium, Larnaca, Cyprus	Japan	3 – (22', 42', 80')	3–0	2008 Cyprus Cup	
9	31 October 2010	Estadio de Béisbol Beto Ávila, Cancún, Mexico	Guyana	4 – (34', 50', 63', 75')	8–0	2010 CONCACAF Women's Gold Cup	
10	19 January 2012	BC Place, Vancouver, BC, Canada	Haiti	4 – (25', 44', 55', 86')	6–0	2012 CONCACAF Women's Olympic Qualifying Tournament	
11	6 August 2012	Old Trafford, Trafford, England	United States	3 – (22', 67', 73')	3–4	2012 Summer Olympics	

== Statistics ==
As of December 5, 2023

Appearances and goals by national team and year
National team	Year	Apps	Goals
Canada	2000	18	15
Canada	2001	12	6
Canada	2002	10	11
Canada	2003	17	11
Canada	2004	9	6
Canada	2005	7	4
Canada	2006	17	13
Canada	2007	13	16
Canada	2008	22	13
Canada	2009	7	4
Canada	2010	16	13
Canada	2011	20	8
Canada	2012	22	23
Canada	2013	13	4
Canada	2014	11	1
Canada	2015	18	10
Canada	2016	18	7
Canada	2017	12	4
Canada	2018	12	8
Canada	2019	15	6
Canada	2020	7	3
Canada	2021	12	2
Canada	2022	11	2
Canada	2023	12	0
Total		331	190

Goals by competition
Competition	Goals
FIFA Women's World Cup	10
CONCACAF Women's Gold Cup / Championship	25
Olympic Games (Note: Includes CONCACAF qualifying rounds.)	33
Invitational tournaments (Note: Includes the Algarve Cup, Cyprus Cup, Four Nations Tournament, International Women's Football Tournament, Pacific Cup, Pan American Games, Peace Queen Cup, the Women's Cup and Yongchuan International Tournament.)	80
Friendlies	42
Total	190

Goals by opponent
Country	Goals
Mexico	17
China	12
Costa Rica	11
Jamaica	11
United States	11
South Korea	9
New Zealand	9
Brazil	8
Haiti	8
Sweden	8
Netherlands	7
Japan	6
Denmark	5
England	4
Germany	4
Guyana	4
Scotland	4
Trinidad and Tobago	4
Australia	3
Ghana	3
Greece	3
Guatemala	3
Italy	3
Norway	3
Russia	3
Uruguay	3
Argentina	2
Cuba	2
France	2
Panama	2
Portugal	2
South Africa	2
Saint Kitts and Nevis	2
Wales	2
Colombia	1
Finland	1
Great Britain	1
Morocco	1
Nigeria	1
Poland	1
Switzerland	1
Zimbabwe	1

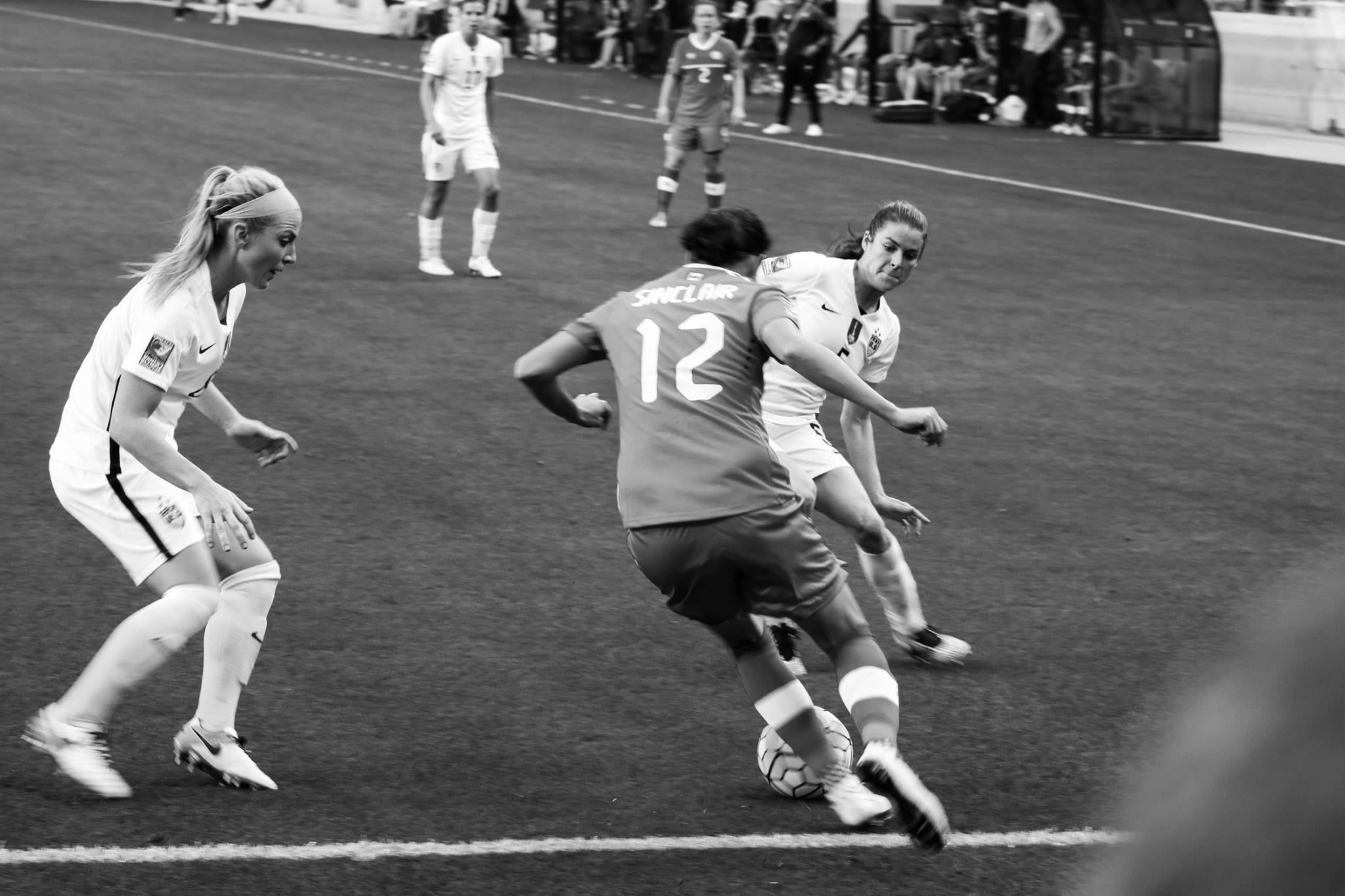
Sinclair takes on two defenders during a match against the United States, January 2017.

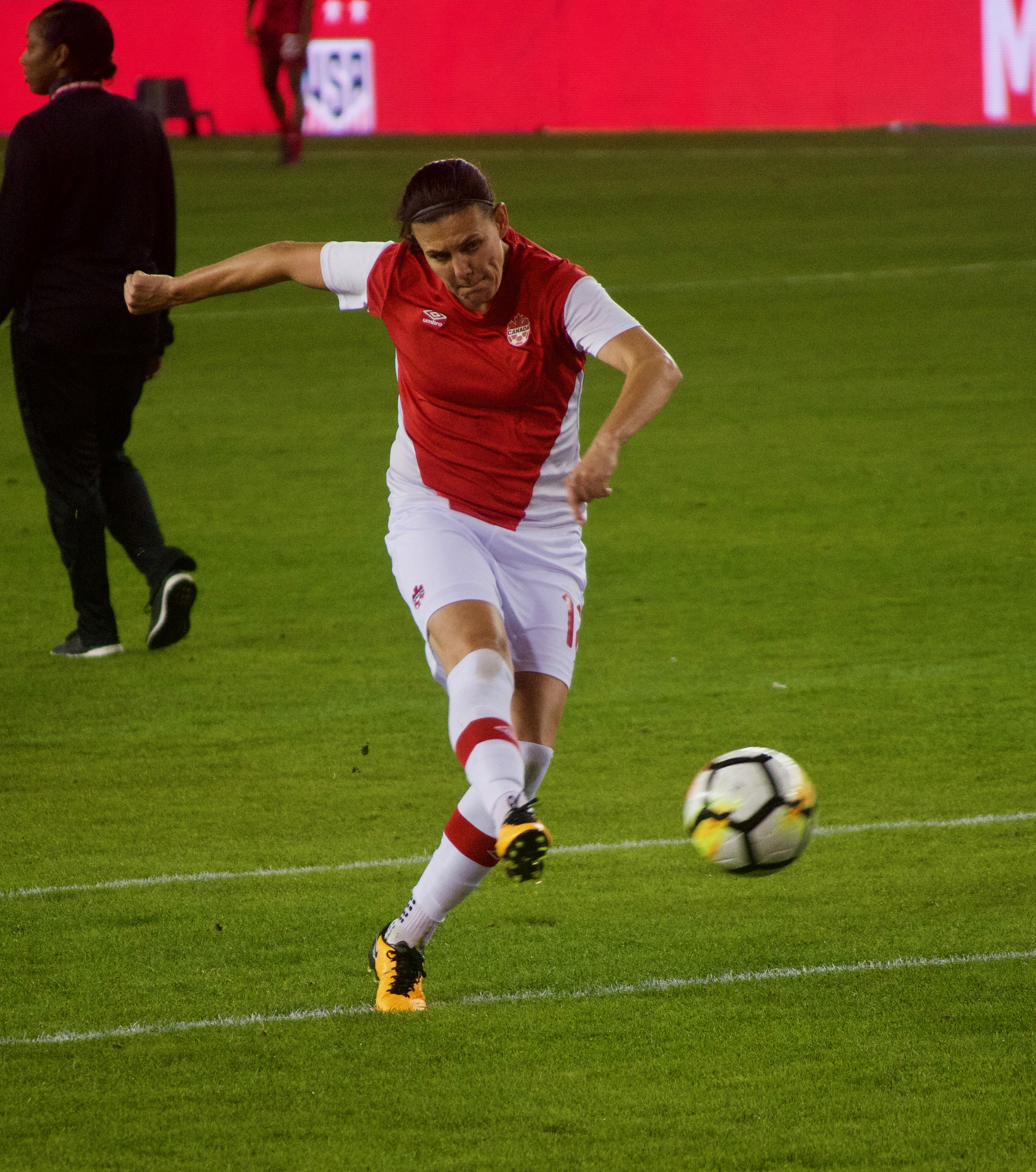
Canada captain Sinclair warms up before a match, November 2017

== See also ==
- List of hat-tricks
- List of women's footballers with 100 or more international goals
- List of footballers with 100 or more caps
- List of women's Olympic football tournament records
