= Christine Sinclair =

Canadian soccer player (born 1983)

Christine Sinclair CC OBC OLY
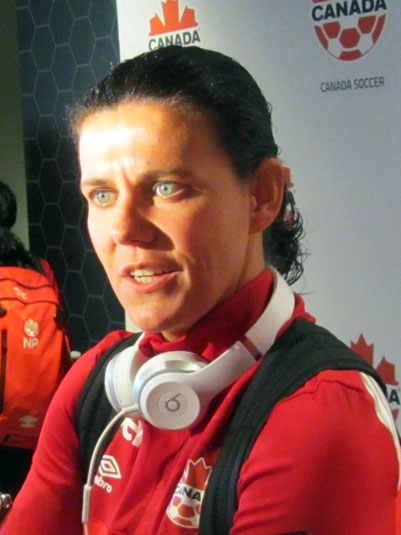
- Sinclair in 2016

Personal information
- Full name: Christine Margaret Sinclair
- Date of birth: June 12, 1983 (age 43)
- Place of birth: Burnaby, British Columbia, Canada
- Height: 1.75 m (5 ft 9 in)
- Position: Forward

Youth career
- South Burnaby Metro Club Bees
- Burnaby Girls SC
- Cliff Avenue United

College career
Years	Team	Apps	(Gls)
2001–2005	Portland Pilots	94	(110)

Senior career*
Years	Team	Apps	(Gls)
1999–2001	Vancouver UBC Alumni	4	(1)
2000	Vancouver Angels	19	(11)
2001–2002	Vancouver Breakers	10	(9)
2006–2008	Vancouver Whitecaps FC	21	(10)
2009–2010	FC Gold Pride	40	(16)
2011–2012	Western New York Flash	15	(10)
2013–2024	Portland Thorns	204	(82)
Total		313	(139)

International career
2001	Canada U-21	4	(7)
2002	Canada U-19	48	(22)
2000–2023	Canada	331	(190)
Medal record
Women's soccer
Representing Canada
Olympic Games
Gold medal – first place	2020 Tokyo	Team
Bronze medal – third place	2012 London	Team
Bronze medal – third place	2016 Rio de Janeiro	Team
CONCACAF W Championship
Winner	2010 Mexico
Runner-up	2002 Canada-United States
Runner-up	2006 United States
Runner-up	2018 United States
Runner-up	2022 Mexico
Pan American Games
Gold medal – first place	2011 Guadalajara	Team
Bronze medal – third place	2007 Rio de Janeiro	Team
FIFA U-20 Women's World Cup
Runner-up	2002 Canada
- * Club domestic league appearances and goals

Christine Margaret Sinclair (born June 12, 1983) is a Canadian former professional soccer player. An Olympic gold medallist, two-time Olympic bronze medallist, CONCACAF champion, and 14-time winner of the Canada Soccer Player of the Year award, Sinclair is the world's all-time leader for international goals scored by men or women, with 190 goals, and is one of the most-capped international soccer players with 331 appearances.

Having played over 20 seasons with the senior national team, Sinclair has participated in six FIFA Women's World Cups (United States 2003, China 2007, Germany 2011, Canada 2015, France 2019, Australia - New Zealand 2023) and four Olympic football tournaments (Beijing 2008, London 2012, Rio 2016, Tokyo 2020), captaining the national team to third-place finishes in 2012 and 2016 and first place in 2020. She is one of four players to score at five World Cup editions, alongside Marta, Cristiano Ronaldo, and Lionel Messi.

At the club level, Sinclair has won championships with three professional teams: the 2010 WPS Championship with FC Gold Pride, the 2011 WPS Championship with Western New York Flash, and the 2013, 2017, and 2022 NWSL Championships with Portland Thorns FC. She won the national collegiate Division I championship twice (2002, 2005) with the University of Portland.

Sinclair was shortlisted for FIFA Women's World Player of the Year seven times (2005–08, 2010, 2012, and 2016), and was referred to by college teammate and international rival Megan Rapinoe as the best player to never win the award. She received the Lou Marsh Trophy as Canada's athlete of the year in 2012, the first soccer player so honoured, and was a two-time recipient of the Bobbie Rosenfeld Award as Canada's female athlete of the year (2012, 2020). In September 2013, Sinclair was inducted into Canada's Walk of Fame and in June 2017, she was appointed an Officer of the Order of Canada by Governor General David Johnston. Sinclair received the Best FIFA Special Award in recognition of her status as the world's all-time leading scorer in 2022. Sinclair was inducted to the Canada Soccer Hall of Fame in 2025, the first individual to have the five-year waiting period after retirement waived by the Canada Soccer Heritage and Hall of Fame Committee.

== Early life ==
Born in Burnaby, British Columbia, to Bill and Sandra Sinclair on June 12, 1983, Sinclair began playing soccer at the age of four for an under-7 team. Her father Bill Sinclair (1972) and uncles Brian (1972) and Bruce Gant (1990) were all Canadian amateur soccer champions while Brian and Bruce also played at the professional level. Her father Bill played for the University of British Columbia and the New Westminster Blues in the Pacific Coast Soccer League.

Christine Sinclair also played basketball and baseball as a youth. Playing in a Burnaby boys' baseball league, she made the local under-11 all-star team as a second baseman. With the team, she chose the number 12 as a tribute to Toronto Blue Jays' second baseman Hall of Famer, Roberto Alomar.

Sinclair was selected to British Columbia's under-14 girls all-star soccer team at age 11 and led club team Burnaby Girls Soccer Club to six league titles, five provincial titles, and two top-five national finishes. She attended Burnaby South Secondary School where she led the soccer team to three league championships. At age 15, she attended matches of the 1999 FIFA Women's World Cup in Portland, Oregon. She played for Canada's under-18 national team before making her debut at the senior level at age 16 at the 2000 Algarve Cup where she scored three goals.

== College career ==
In 2001, Sinclair arrived at the University of Portland where she joined the soccer program. She recorded 23 goals and eight assists in her first season, leading all first-year students in NCAA Division I total scoring. She was named Freshman of the Year by Soccer America, and was a consensus All-America selection.

"Coming into that program, (head coach) Clive (Charles) saw me as a young player, but a leader on the team. He expected a lot from me even as a freshman. I had experienced it before, being young and being in the national team travelling the world. It was such a smooth transition for me and the fact that it was a small school really helped me. I think I would've gotten lost in some of those bigger schools."

— Christine Sinclair

During her second season with the Pilots in 2002, Sinclair led Division I in goals with 26. She scored two goals during the national championship game against conference rival Santa Clara, the second of which was a golden goal that won the Pilots the national championship. Sinclair earned three different national Player of the Year honours, and was a finalist for the Hermann Trophy. Named West Coast Conference Player of the Year, she earned All-American honours for the second consecutive year. Following her performances for the Canadian national teams and American collegiate soccer, she was named by The Globe and Mail as one of the 25 most influential people in Canadian sports the same year.

Sinclair chose to redshirt the 2003 season to play for Canada at the 2003 FIFA Women's World Cup. She returned to Portland in 2004 and scored 22 goals for the Pilots. Following the season, she was named West Coast Conference (WCC) Player of the Year, received All-American honours, and was awarded the Hermann Trophy.

During Sinclair's senior year at Portland, she set an all-time Division I goal-scoring record with 39. She capped off her collegiate career with two goals in a 4–0 rout of UCLA in the national title game. This performance also gave her a career total of 25 goals in NCAA tournament play, also a record. She was named WCC Player of the Year becoming the second player in conference history to be honoured three times. Sinclair was also named Academic All-American of the Year by ESPN The Magazine after graduating with a 3.75 grade point average in life sciences. She was awarded the M.A.C. Hermann Trophy, becoming the fourth player and third woman to win it in back-to-back years. As a result of her record-setting season, Sinclair went on to win the Honda Sports Award as the nation's top soccer player, as well as the Honda-Broderick Cup, as the college woman athlete of the year. She became the third soccer player to win the award, joining Mia Hamm and Cindy Daws. Sinclair finished her collegiate career with 110 goals and 32 assists in 94 games. Her 110 goals scored total is the second most of any player in NCAA history.

== Club career ==
=== Early career ===
Sinclair started her senior career as a teenager with Vancouver UBC Alumni where she won Metro Soccer League titles, the BC Cup, and a runners up medal at Canada Soccer's 2000 National Championships. She played youth soccer and high school soccer at the same time and got her first call up to Canadian youth team in 1999. She also played for the Vancouver Angels in the Women's Premier Soccer League (2000) and the Vancouver Breakers / Vancouver Whitecaps in the USL W-League.

In 2000, Sinclair helped the Vancouver Angels finish in fourth place in the WPSL, although she missed the first few matches of the season while representing Canada at the 2000 Concacaf Gold Cup. She scored her first WPSL goal on 15 July 2000 in a 2-1 loss to the Los Angeles Ajax at Coquitlam Town Centre.

=== FC Gold Pride ===
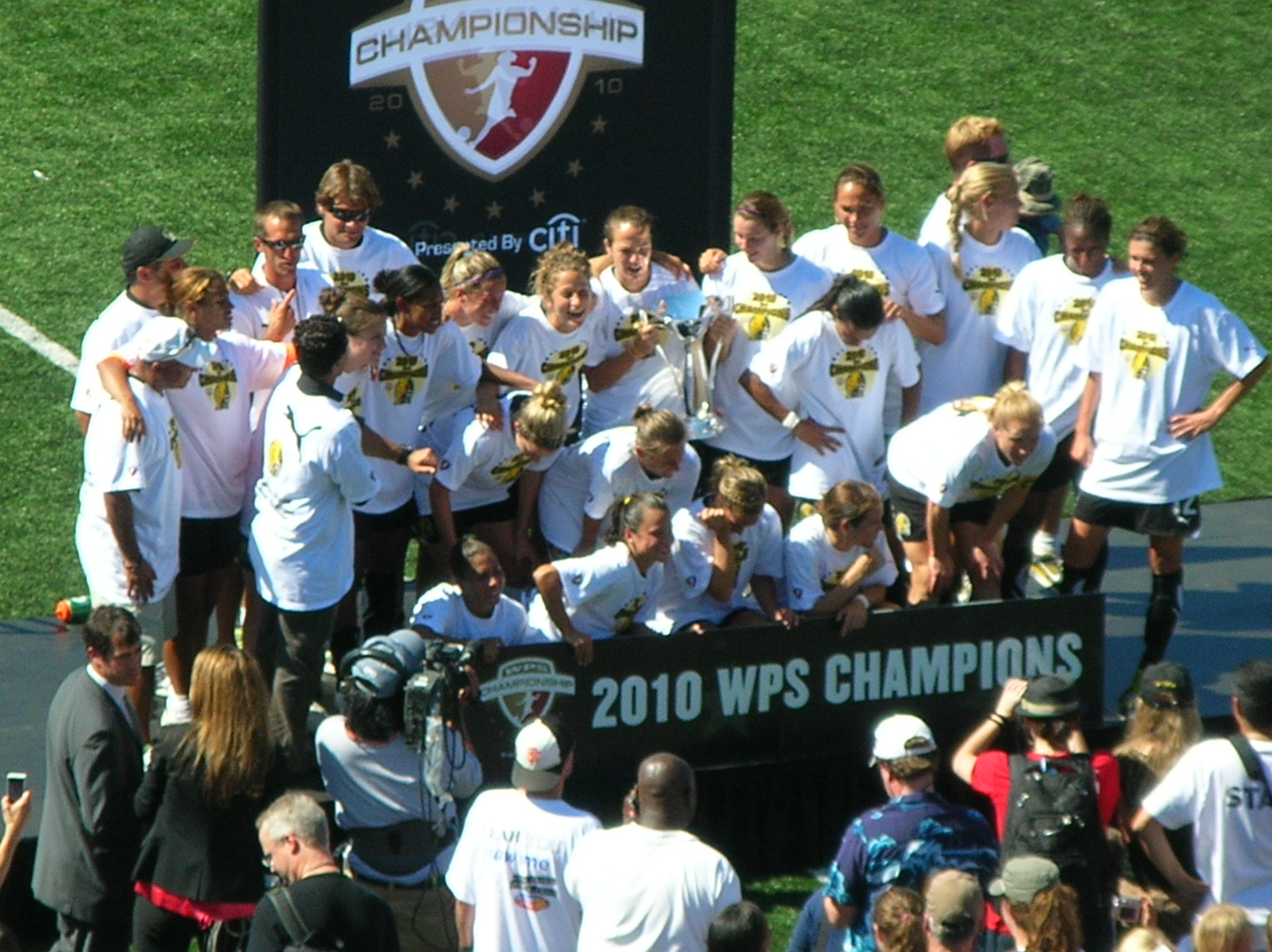
Sinclair (far right) with FC Gold Pride won the 2010 WPS Championship Trophy

Sinclair was selected by FC Gold Pride eighth overall in the 2008 WPS International Draft for the inaugural season of top-tier American league Women's Professional Soccer (WPS). Despite her team-leading six goals, FC Gold Pride finished last in the regular season standings during the 2009 season.

Leading into the 2010 season, FC Gold Pride made several changes to their roster including adding Brazilian international Marta, French international Camille Abily, and United States national team defender and midfielder Shannon Boxx. During the team's home opener of the 2010 season against 2009 WPS champion, Sky Blue FC, Sinclair scored twice leading the team to a 3–1 win. She was named WPS Player of the Week for week 14 of the season after scoring two goals against second-place team, Philadelphia Independence. The team dominated the season, finishing first during the regular season after defeating the Philadelphia Independence 4–1 with goals from Sinclair, Marta, and Kelley O'Hara.

As the regular season champion, FC Gold Pride earned a direct route to the championship playoff game where they faced the Philadelphia Independence. Sinclair contributed two goals to FC Gold Pride's 4–0 win to clinch the WPS Championship. Despite their successful season, the club ceased operations on November 16, 2010, due to not meeting the league's financial reserve requirement.

=== Western New York Flash ===
"I can't praise Christine Sinclair enough...She's just a world-class soccer player. What she has given us this year—she's given us everything."

— Aaran Lines, Western New York Flash head coach

On December 10, 2010, Western New York Flash announced that they had agreed to terms with the Canadian striker for the 2011 season. Sinclair helped guide the team to the regular season championship, leading the club with ten goals and eight assists. On August 27, 2011, Sinclair was named MVP of the 2011 WPS Championship Final after the Flash won the championship in Rochester, New York. Sinclair's goal in the 64th minute gave the Flash a 1–0 lead over Philadelphia. When the game was forced to penalty kicks, Sinclair stepped up and completed the second one as the Flash players converted all five of their attempts.

=== Portland Thorns FC ===
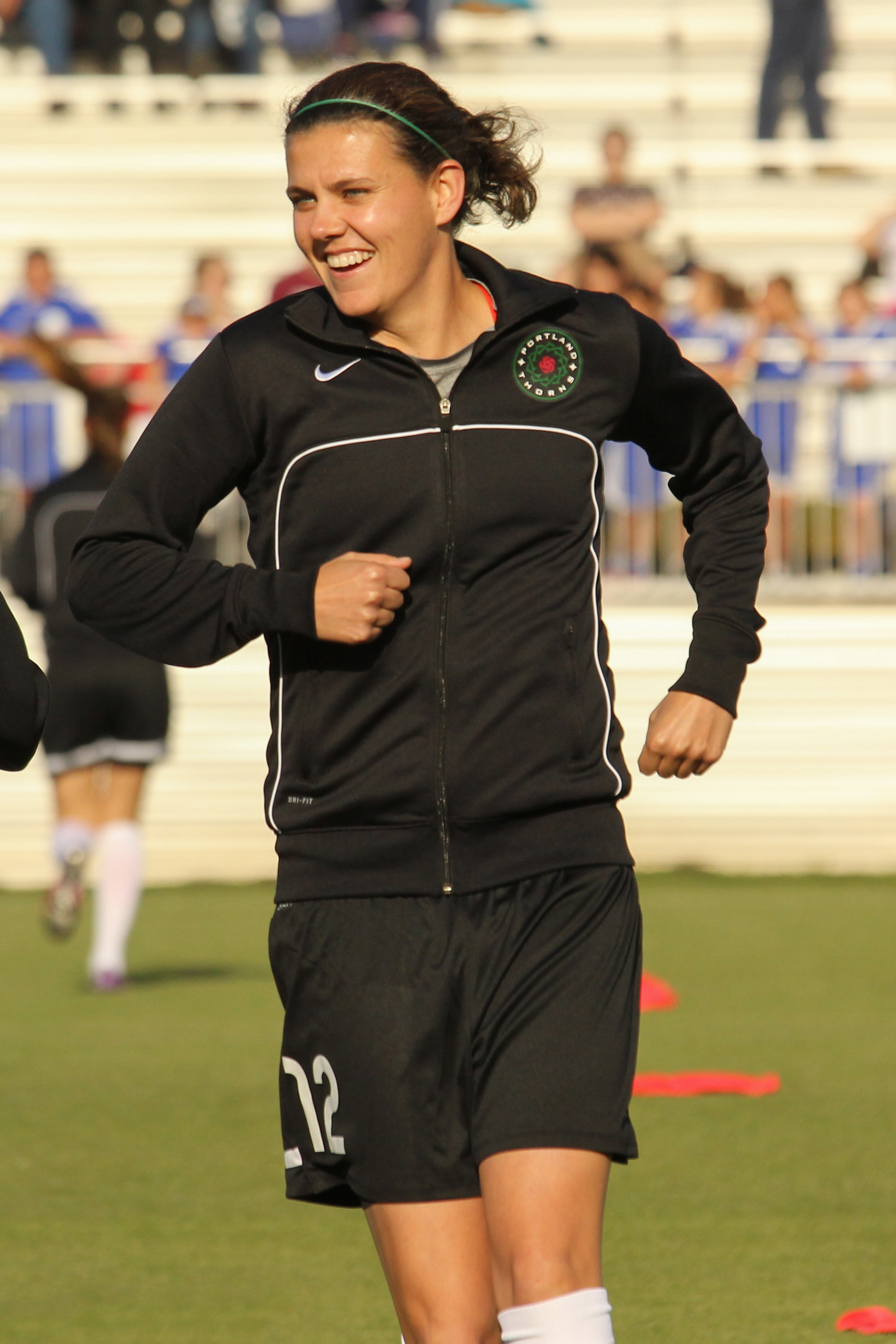
Sinclair with the Portland Thorns in 2013

On January 11, 2013, it was announced that Sinclair would play for the Portland Thorns FC for the inaugural season of the National Women's Soccer League via the NWSL Player Allocation. Sinclair said she had told the league upon its founding that she would only play in Portland.

Playing as team captain, she appeared in 20 games in the 2013 season and tied with Alex Morgan as the top scorer on the team with eight goals. Sinclair was named the league's Player of the Month for the month of April after scoring two goals and serving one assist to help the team secure a 2–0–1 record.

After finishing third during the regular season, the Thorns advanced to the playoffs where they defeated second-place team FC Kansas City 3–2 during overtime. During the championship final against regular season champions Western New York Flash, Sinclair scored the final goal to defeat the Flash 2–0, winning the inaugural NWSL championship.

In the 2017 season, she led the Thorns in scoring with eight goals during the regular season, with the team finishing second. In the playoffs, she scored a goal, tying the record for NWSL playoff goals, en route to the team's second championship in the NWSL Final. In the pandemic-shortened 2020 season, Sinclair led the Thorns with six goals, five more than any of her teammates, helping the Thorns win the NWSL Fall Series.

In 2022, Sinclair captained the team to a second-place finish in the regular season and a third championship title as the Thorns beat the Kansas City Current 2–0. She set the league record for most playoff minutes played.

After scoring in the 2nd minute of a 2–0 win over Racing Louisville in April 2023, Sinclair become the second player in NWSL history to reach 60 career goals.

On September 27, 2024, Sinclair announced her retirement from club soccer at the end of the 2024 NWSL season. In her last NWSL regular season match, she scored in a 3–0 win over Angel City FC, helping Portland to qualify for the playoffs and earning her 66th regular season goal, a club record for the Thorns and the third most overall in the league's history. She played her final game on November 10, 2024, a 2–1 loss against Gotham FC in the NWSL playoffs, a game which broke the club's attendance record with 15,540 attending the match at Red Bull Arena.

On July 23, 2025, it was announced that Sinclair would be the first player to be inducted into the Portland Thorns Hall of Fame. On October 4, 2025, she became the first person to receive this honour, and the Thorns retired her number 12 jersey from play.

== International career ==
=== Early years and rise to captaincy (2000–2007) ===
Sinclair played for Canada's under-18 national team before she got her first call up to the national team in early 2000 under newly-hired Head Coach Even Pellerud. She scored her first (unofficial) Canada goal in an exhibition match against the Metro League All-Stars. She then travelled with the squad to the 2000 Algarve Cup where she was the tournament's co-second leading scorer with three goals. She scored seven goals for Canada at the 2002 CONCACAF Women's Gold Cup, tying her for the tournament lead with Canadian team captain Charmaine Hooper and US player Tiffeny Milbrett, a fellow Portland alumna. Canada finished second at the Gold Cup, qualifying them to the 2003 FIFA Women's World Cup. The same year, Sinclair represented Canada at the inaugural FIFA U-19 Women's World Championship. Her record-setting ten goals in the tournament helped lead Canada to a second-place finish and earned her both the Golden Boot as leading scorer and Golden Ball as tournament MVP.

Canada's FIFA Women's World Cup squad for the 2003 edition in the United States was subsequently remembered for its mix of veteran players like Hooper and younger members like Sinclair, Diana Matheson, and Erin McLeod. During the team's first group stage match against Germany, she scored the first goal of the match in the fourth minute. Germany scored four goals to defeat Canada 4–1. After defeating Argentina 3–0, the team faced Japan in their last group stage match of the tournament. With goals from Sinclair and teammates Christine Latham and Kara Lang, Canada won 3–1 and placed second in their group to advance to the knockout stage. Canada faced defending silver medalists China in the quarterfinal match on October 2 in Portland, Oregon and won 1–0 with the lone goal scored by Hooper in the seventh minute. Having remained winless in all previous World Cup tournaments, Canada's advancement to the semi-final was a historic change for the team. Canada was defeated by Sweden in the semi-final match 2–1 and faced the United States in the third-place match where they were defeated 3–1 and finished fourth at the tournament. Sinclair scored Canada's goal in the 38th minute. In all, she scored three goals for Canada on their way to a surprising fourth-place finish, their best in that competition to date.

Following the success at the World Cup, Sinclair and her teammates had high expectations of qualifying to the women's tournament at the 2004 Summer Olympics in Athens. However, they were defeated by Mexico in the qualifying tournament semi-final, and thus did not obtain one of the two berths allotted to CONCACAF.

Sinclair's rapid ascendancy within the team was accelerated further by a major controversy between coach Even Pellerud and veteran players Hooper, Christine Latham and Sharolta Nonen, with the latter publicly attacking the former's management of the team and alleged interference in domestic club matters. As a result, Pellerud did not include the players in the roster, and Sinclair was named captain of the team in advance of the 2006 CONCACAF Women's Gold Cup. Subsequent arbitration sided with Pellerud, marking the end of the twenty-year national team career of Hooper. Sinclair opined that "it's an unfortunate way to go out but that's her choice."

Canada's results at the Gold Cup qualified them for the 2007 FIFA Women's World Cup in China. During Canada's first group stage match, the team faced Norway and were defeated 2–1. Sinclair scored a brace in the team's next group stage match against Ghana helping Canada win 4–0. She scored another goal in the 85th minute of the team's final group stage match against Australia, which would have been sufficient to advance to the knockout stage had it held, but Australia equalized in stoppage time and Canada exited the tournament. Later in the year, Sinclair led the team to a bronze medal at the 2007 Pan American Games.

=== Olympic debut, CONCACAF gold, and World Cup nadir (2008–2011) ===
In a rematch of the Olympic qualifying semi-final of four years' prior, Canada defeated Mexico in the qualifying tournament for the 2008 Summer Olympics in Beijing, reaching the Olympic Games for the first time after finishing second to the United States in the event final. Sinclair said it "was sweet revenge, absolutely perfect." In China, Canada advanced out of the group stage before being defeated by the United States, the eventual gold medalists, in their quarter-final match, with Sinclair scoring Canada's lone goal in the 2–1 loss. Despite this, she said "we did pretty well," while adding "obviously we would have liked to go farther."

Appearing in a friendly match against Poland on February 20, 2010, Sinclair scored her 100th career goal and broke the Canadian women's national team appearance record of 132 previously set by former teammate Andrea Neil. She was the first Canadian, and tenth woman overall, to score 100 international goals. Later in the year, at the 2010 CONCACAF Women's Championship, the team reached the event final, where Sinclair scored the game-winning goal in a victory over Mexico. This was the first major championship title of Sinclair's national team career, and qualified them to the 2011 FIFA Women's World Cup. Upon receiving her sixth consecutive award as Canadian player of the year, she said that "there's no doubt in my mind that we can do some damage at the World Cup."

The leadup to the 2011 World Cup was dogged by disputes with the Canadian Soccer Association over funding the compensation issues, which prompted coach Carolina Morace to announce that she would leave her post following the end of the tournament. Sinclair led the players on strike in support of Morace. Ultimately, Morace agreed to continue after negotiations.

At the World Cup, Canada faced host nation Germany in its opening game, losing 2–1. Despite having her nose broken by an elbow from a German defender, Sinclair refused to be taken out of the game and scored Canada's lone goal of the tournament. The broken nose required Sinclair to wear a protective mask for the remainder of the tournament which hampered her play since she could not see properly. The next game was a 4–0 rout at the hands of France that eliminated Canada from the tournament with a game to spare. She would later describe it was "the lowest point in my soccer career, the worst game I'd ever seen our team play." They went on to lose 1–0 to Nigeria in a dead rubber, making Canada finish last in the group.

Following the disappointment in Germany, Morace unexpecteldy quit and was replaced by John Herdman, who made it a priority to revive team morale. He would regularly cite photographs of Sinclair's "deflated" expression after the loss to France as a motivation to improve the team's performance. Later the same year, Sinclair and the team won gold at the 2011 Pan American Games. She also served as the Canadian flagbearer at the opening ceremonies.

=== London Olympics (2012) ===
The 2012 Summer Olympics in London began in unpromising fashion for the Canadian team, who lost their opening game to Japan. After defeating South Africa and drawing Sweden, Canada nevertheless advanced out of the group stage as the third seed, led by performances from Sinclair and Melissa Tancredi. Sinclair scored two goals against the South Africans. Canada faced host nation Great Britain in the quarter-final, defeating them 2–0, with Sinclair scoring the second goal of the match.

The Olympic semi-final was held at the historic Old Trafford, home of Manchester United F.C., on August 6. Canada faced its longtime rival the United States, with the latter heavily favoured. Sinclair scored the match's opening goal in the first half, beginning a back-and-forth with the Americans that saw the game tied at 3–3 at the end of regulation, Sinclair having recorded a hat-trick, before Alex Morgan scored the game-winning goal for the United States in extra time. The game was both widely praised and extremely controversial, with The Guardian declaring it "the greatest knockout match in major-tournament football since 1982." American publications dubbed it "one of the best games ever" and "an instant classic." Controversy, meanwhile, related to the performance of referee Christina Pedersen, who made a series of calls in favour of the Americans, most notably what some characterized as a "a peculiarly harsh decision" against Canadian goalkeeper McLeod for holding onto the ball for supposed time wasting, the beginning of a series of events that led to the game being tied again on a US penalty shot.

Sinclair and others on the team, including coach Herdman, harshly criticized Pedersen's officiating after the match was completed, with the captain stating "we feel cheated. It's a shame that in a game as important as that, the ref decided the result before it started." Pedersen claimed that she had overheard Sinclair calling her a "fucking whore" following the game at Old Trafford, which Sinclair denied, stating that she had said "fucking horrible." The latter was referred for a disciplinary hearing after the Games, but Sinclair remained able to play pending said hearing, helping the team to a bronze medal victory over France.

With six goals in the tournament, Sinclair was awarded the Golden Boot. In recognition of her achievements at the Games, Sinclair was named Canada's flag bearer for the closing ceremonies, and on the day of the ceremonies she was also awarded a Queen Elizabeth II Diamond Jubilee Medal. Further honours came in the following months, including the Lou Marsh Trophy as Canadian athlete of the year, and the Bobbie Rosenfeld Award from The Canadian Press as their choice for Canadian female athlete of the year. She was, in both instances, the first soccer player recipient. She was also named Athlete of the Year by Sportsnet. The London Olympics significantly raised Sinclair's profile both within Canada and internationally. The New York Times dubbed her the "face of soccer in Canada".

Sinclair's alleged comments to Pedersen ultimately led to her fined a reported $3,500 for "unsporting behaviour" and suspended from four international games. For her part, she claimed "I don't regret what I said."

=== Home World Cup and Rio Olympics (2013–2016) ===
After serving her suspension after the London Olympics, Sinclair returned to the pitch midway through the 2013 Cyprus Women's Cup, scoring the game-winning goal against Finland. She later made her 200th appearance on December 12, 2013, scoring her 147th international goal in a 2–0 win over Scotland at the 2013 Torneio Internacional Cidade de São Paulo.

Sinclair's goal in the 60th minute of Canada's 3–0 win against Finland in the opening game of the 2014 Cyprus Cup meant that she had scored at least once per year for Canada for 15 consecutive years.

With the 2015 FIFA Women's World Cup to be hosted in Canada, Sinclair's new celebrity put her even more so in the spotlight in the leadup, including being featured on a Canada Post-issued commemorative stamp. In light of the team's last-place finish in 2011 and its subsequent bronze medal at the Olympics, there were expectations on the team to perform on home soil. Sinclair scored Canada's only goal of the first group stage match against China, a 1–0 win, during a penalty kick awarded in the second minute of second-half stoppage time. Canada drew its remaining two group stage matches, but finished first in the group and faced Switzerland in the Round of 16. Defeating the Swiss 1–0 in the opening of the knockout stage, Canada advanced to face England. In the quarter-final, Sinclair scored Canada's lone goal in the 42nd minute, with Canada ultimately losing the match 2–1.

Following this underwhelming result at home, Canada focused on qualifying for the 2016 Summer Olympics in Rio de Janeiro. The team reached the final of the 2016 CONCACAF Women's Olympic Qualifying Championship, thereby qualifying to the Olympic Games, and losing the championship match to the United States 2–0. Sinclair played through a calf injury during the tournament, and only featured in the final game as a substitute in the second half, but still surpassed American Mia Hamm for second place on the international goal-scoring standings. A month later, Sinclair led Canada to victory at the 2016 edition of the Algarve Cup, the event she had made her senior debut at 16 years earlier. Canada defeated Olympic host nation Brazil in the final.

At the Olympic women's tournament, Canada swept its three group stage games, culminating in a historic win over Germany that broke a 12-game, 22-year losing streak. Sinclair did not see the pitch for the latter game, resting in anticipation of the knockout rounds. Canada defeated France in the quarter-final, but was defeated in a semi-final rematch with Germany by 2–1. Playing in the bronze medal game for the second consecutive Olympics, Sinclair scored the game-winning goal against Brazil.

=== World Cup disappointment and international goals record (2017–2020) ===
While discussions about potential successors for Sinclair's role on the national team had been underway since early in the 2010s, by the leadup to the 2019 FIFA Women's World Cup, with Sinclair now age 35 the prospect of her eventual retirement attracted more discussion. However, she was by this point closing in on the international goals record long held by American Abby Wambach. She scored her 181st goal in a pre-tournament friendly against Mexico, putting her only four away from Wambach's 184.

At the World Cup, hosted by France, Canada narrowly defeated Cameroon in its opening group stage match, albeit with a performance that was faulted by some commentators for difficulty in creating chances to score by players other than Sinclair. Playing in the 1–0 opening win, Sinclair became the oldest player to represent Canada at a Women's World Cup, aged 35 years and 363 days. After defeating New Zealand, Canada faced the Netherlands in its final group match. Sinclair scored Canada's lone goal in a 2–1 loss, her tenth goal in five different World Cup editions, equalling the achievement first accomplished by Brazilian Marta seven days earlier. Facing Sweden in the Round of 16, Canada was down 1–0 when they were awarded a penalty after a hand ball by a Swedish defender. While Sinclair commonly took penalties for the team, in this instance she was aware that Swedish keeper Hedvig Lindahl had saved her penalty attempt at the Algarve Cup the previous March, and opted to have Janine Beckie take it instead. Beckie's attempt was saved by Lindahl, and Canada were ultimately eliminated. Sinclair's decision was the subject of much debate, with some comparing it to the much-criticized decision not to have Wayne Gretzky participate in a game-deciding shootout at the ice hockey tournament at the 1998 Winter Olympics. The performance of the national team was widely critiqued in the aftermath of the event, with many commentators faulting the lack of goal-scoring threat from players other than Sinclair. The Canadian Press remarked that "the remarkable Sinclair is in the twilight of her career. Some time sooner than later, she will walk away for good. Monday proved how difficult that will be."

Continuing her pursuit of the international goals record through the Qualifying Championship for the 2020 Summer Olympics, Sinclair scored international goals 184 and 185 against St. Kitts and Nevis to tie and then surpass Wambach for first place in international goals by either men or women. She avowed that "for me it has nothing to do with the record, it's to have young girls be able to dream of playing professionally or represent their country, win Olympic medals. To inspire young girls to pursue their crazy, wild dreams, it's pretty cool." Canada reached the tournament final, thereby qualifying for the Olympics, and lost 3–0 to the United States in the final.

The onset of the COVID-19 pandemic resulted in a shift of the entire global sporting calendar, including the delay of the Olympics by a full year. At the end of 2020, she received her second Bobbie Rosenfeld Award, in recognition of her international goal-scoring record. Globe & Mail editor Phil King opined "when the history of women's sports is written in this country, Christine Sinclair deserves her own chapter." That same month she was honoured at The Best FIFA Football Awards. Her 185th international goal was named Canada Soccer's Moment of the Year

=== Olympic gold (2021) ===
On July 21, 2021, Sinclair played her 300th match for Canada, in which she scored a goal in a 1–1 draw against hosts Japan in the team's opening match of the Olympic women's tournament in Tokyo. Canada accumulated one win and two tied games during group play, before advancing to face Brazil in the quarter-final. Scoreless during regular play, Canada prevailed in the shootout 4–3, despite Sinclair being denied on the opening attempt. Following this, Sinclair advised coach Bev Priestman that future penalties in the tournament should be taken by midfielder Jessie Fleming.

Canada faced the United States in the semi-final on August 2, a rematch of the 2012 Olympic semi-final. With the game tied 0–0 in the second half, a penalty was drawn by Deanne Rose for Canada, and Sinclair delivered the ball to Fleming, a gesture that was taken to be an on-the-spot decision by many observers at the time. As Fleming was considered by many to be the team's best younger player, Sinclair later wrote that "some people interpreted me handing Jessie the ball as a passing of the torch. Sometimes people read too much into things." Fleming scored, with Canada going on to win the game 1–0 and advance to the Olympic final for the first time in the team's history. This was also their first victory over the United States in twenty years. In reference to the London Olympics, Sinclair opined afterward that "it was nice to get a little revenge."

The greatest testament to what she has meant to Canadian soccer may well be the fact that in the biggest victory of her career, she wasn't her team's best player on the night. At age 38, she couldn't be. Keeper Stephanie Labbé took that honour in the end, but Jessie Fleming and Ashley Laurence and Kadeisha Buchanan and Vanessa Gilles and Desiree Scott – who was once one of the kids and is now one of the greybeards – all had more influence on the play.

— Stephen Brunt, Sportsnet

In the final against Sweden on August 6, Sinclair won a penalty, which was once again converted by Fleming to tie the game in the second half of regulation time. Following a 1–1 draw after extra-time, Canada eventually won the match 3–2 on penalty kicks to capture the gold medal in women's soccer for the first time. Sinclair was substituted before extra time, her place taken by Jordyn Huitema, and she thus did not feature among the team's participants in the penalty kicks. The Canadian team's victory was widely hailed as the most important moment in its history, and of Canadian soccer in general. Sinclair had not played as large a role on-field as she had for most of her career, with Cathal Kelly of The Globe & Mail describing her as "first in our hearts and fourth or fifth on the depth chart." However, both Kelly and other commentators unanimously attributed the team's success to Sinclair's long career and leadership.

Having already been honoured at the Best FIFA Football Awards the previous year, at the 2021 edition she received a Special Award for her goal-scoring record, alongside Cristiano Ronaldo, who had recently set the men's record for the same.

=== Federation conflicts, sixth World Cup, and retirement (2022–2023) ===
The Tokyo Olympics marked the beginning of a change in Sinclair's usage; the semi-final against the United States was the final international game in which she played a full 90 minutes. Following the Games, she and a number of other veterans became increasingly vocal about the need to establish a women's domestic professional league in Canada, arguing that it was essential to all the national team to keep pace with rival teams and to create more opportunities for the nation's female players. Sinclair described it as "a disaster to not have a professional league in the country that just won the Olympic Games." In December 2022, she and former teammate Diana Matheson announced plans to launch a league in 2025, with Matheson taking the lead in organizing it. Sinclair faulted the lack of any progress by the Canada Soccer Association in establishing a professional league in the decade since the London Olympics.

Sinclair scored her final international goal on July 5, 2022, the opening goal of a 6–0 win over Trinidad and Tobago in the 2022 CONCACAF W Championship.

In addition to issues surrounding the lack of a professional league, Sinclair took the lead in conflicts with the federation over the women's national team's funding and compensation. The team announced that it would not participate in the 2023 SheBelieves Cup in February 2023, but went ahead with the tournament after Canada Soccer threatened legal action against them. With morale low, the team performed poorly and finished last among the four participants. The following month, Sinclair testified before a House of Commons standing committee, denouncing the federation's treatment of the team and saying that she had been personally insulted by former federation president Nick Bontis. Bontis would subsequently issue a public apology.

Sinclair was named to the Canadian squad for the 2023 FIFA Women's World Cup in Australia and New Zealand, her sixth edition of the tournament, and generally presumed to be her last. As the defending Olympic champions, Canada was among the pre-tournament favourites. Canada was drawn into a group that included host nation Australia. Canada opened the tournament with its third World Cup meeting with Nigeria. Sinclair drew a penalty after being fouled in the box, but with Fleming absent due to injury concerns, she herself took it. Her attempt was saved by Chiamaka Nnadozie, and as the match ended in a 0–0 draw, this came to be seen as a pivotal moment in the outcome. In a reverse of the 2019 World Cup penalty attempt by Beckie, commentators debated whether it was a mistake for Sinclair to take the penalty. Sinclair did not start against Ireland, the first time in her career she had not been in the starting line-up for Canada at the World Cup, but came off the bench for the second half. She was generally credited for helping Canada come back to win 2–1 after a poor first half. Sinclair started in the final group match against Australia, with Canada only requiring draw to qualify for the knockout stage. However, Sinclair was substituted at half-time as Canada trailed 2–0 and ending up losing 4–0, eliminating them from the tournament. Sinclair was observed gathering blades of grass from the field, acknowledging when asked that this was "probably" her final World Cup appearance. Following the loss, Sinclair renewed her previous public warnings about the need for greater resources for women's soccer in Canada. It was the first World Cup in which Sinclair competed but did not score.

Following the disappointment in Australia, coach Priestman made significant alterations to the team's composition in advance of their next fixtures, the two-legged CONCACAF Olympic qualification playoff against Jamaica in September. Sinclair did not play in the first match, and came off the bench to play thirty minutes in the second match at BMO Field. Canada won both matches, securing its fifth consecutive Olympic appearance. Priestman revealed afterward that "Christine told me I want to get this team to the Olympics. … After this window, we'll sit down, we'll reflect."

I can sit here and know that I've literally done everything I can and given all of me to this national team since I was 16 years old. In terms of what I've done and knowing the work I've put into it, I have zero regrets. I know I've done everything I can for as long as I can. And the team's in good hands moving forward.

— Christine Sinclair

On October 20, Sinclair announced that she would retire from international soccer in December 2023. The announcement drew reflection and praise from both former teammates and opponents. She subsequently revealed that she "was going to walk off and not say a word and just be done" after the Olympic qualifiers, but following the federation scheduling four friendlies in Montreal, Halifax, Victoria and Vancouver, she was persuaded to play in what was widely described as a "farewell tour." Sinclair played in her final international match on December 5, a 1–0 victory in a friendly versus Australia, held at BC Place in Vancouver. In recognition of her achievements, the stadium was renamed "Christine Sinclair Place" for the day. Sinclair started the match, and was involved in Quinn's game-winning goal. She was substituted in favour of Sophie Schmidt, also making her final international appearance, in the 58th minute. The match was attended by 48,112 people, a record audience for a women's friendly in Canada. At the time of her retirement and still true in 2026, Sinclair's 331 international caps was the second-most of all time, behind only American Kristine Lilly.

== Personal life ==
Described as a highly private individual, Sinclair is known for largely avoiding discussions of her personal life outside of certain causes. Since 2017, she has been active in fundraising for research and treatment of multiple sclerosis, which her mother suffered from. Her mother's death in February 2022 prompted Sinclair to write Playing the Long Game: A Memoir, her first extensive account of her life and career.

Among other honours received in her career, Sinclair was inducted into Canada's Walk of Fame in 2013. She received an honorary degree from Simon Fraser University later in the same year. In 2015, Sinclair, along with teammate Kadeisha Buchanan, was featured on a Canadian postage stamp commemorating the 2015 Women's World Cup hosted by Canada. On June 30, 2017, she was appointed an Officer of the Order of Canada, the second-highest award a civilian can receive, with investiture of the award on January 24, 2018. Of the honour she said, "I am a very, very proud Canadian, I am proud of where I am from, and to be recognized in this nature is surreal. It's not something you can dream about happening to you. I can dream of winning a World Cup or an Olympic gold medal, and that's my job, but to have your country recognize you – I don't even know what to say." On June 26, 2026, Sinclair was promoted to Companion of the Order of Canada, the highest grade in the Order.

In June 2021, her home city of Burnaby announced that they would be renaming the Fortius Sport and Health Facilities in her honour, the Facilities becoming the Christine Sinclair Community Centre.

In December 2023, one day after her final international game for Canada, Sinclair launched the Christine Sinclair Foundation, which held its inaugural summit in December 2024 at the National Soccer Development Centre in Vancouver. The organization's mandate is to empower and support girls to pursue pathways in soccer.

On October 7, 2024, it was announced that Sinclair would join the ownership group for Vancouver Rise FC of the Northern Super League. The club won the inaugural Diana B. Matheson Cup on November 15, 2025.

== Player profile ==
=== Style of play ===
Sinclair is a forward, known for her ball skills, athleticism, technique, and field vision, and has been widely regarded as "Canada's greatest soccer player of all time." Sinclair plays both as a striker and also as an advanced playmaker in midfield, due to her passing accuracy, ability to read the game, link-up with other midfielders, and creation of chances for teammates. Sinclair is also known for scoring from free-kicks and penalties. Moreover, she has been labelled as a "big game" player in the media, due to her penchant for scoring goals in important games for her country, as illustrated by her hat-trick against the United States in the semi-finals of the 2012 Olympic Games. In addition to her soccer abilities, she has stood out for her leadership and defensive work-rate throughout her career.

== In popular culture ==
=== Television and film ===
Sinclair was the focus of a digital short documentary entitled The Captain in 2012. She was featured in an episode of The Difference Makers with Rick Hansen the same year. In May 2015, she was featured in the TSN documentary, RISE, along with the rest of the Canadian national team. She starred in a national television commercial for Coca-Cola during the summer of 2015.

=== Magazines ===
Sinclair was featured on the cover of the June 2013 issue of The Walrus. She was featured Sportsnet Magazine in the edition dated June 8, 2015. She was featured on the covers of Ottawa Life Magazine (May/June 2015), FACES Magazine (December 2015), and Canadian Business (August 2016).

=== Other work ===
Sinclair was featured on the Canadian version of EA Sports' FIFA 16 (2016) video game. Along with Portland Thorns FC teammates Alex Morgan and Steph Catley, Sinclair was one of the first women to appear on the cover of any EA Sports game. In July 2017, Sinclair partnered with A&W and the Multiple Sclerosis Society of Canada on a nationwide awareness campaign for multiple sclerosis.

== Career statistics ==
=== Club ===
As of match played November 10, 2024

Appearances and goals by club, season and competition
Club	Season	League			League cup (Note: NWSL Challenge Cup started in 2020)		Playoffs		Continental		Total	
Club	Season	Division	Apps	Goals	Apps	Goals	Apps	Goals	Apps	Goals	Apps	Goals
FC Gold Pride	2009	WPS	17	6	—		0	0	—		17	6
FC Gold Pride	2010	WPS	23	12	—		1	0	—		24	12
FC Gold Pride	Total		40	18	0	0	1	0	0	0	41	18
Western New York Flash	2011	WPS	15	10	—		1	1	—		16	11
Portland Thorns FC	2013	NWSL	20	8	—		2	1	—		22	9
Portland Thorns FC	2014	NWSL	23	7	—		1	0	—		24	7
Portland Thorns FC	2015	NWSL	9	2	—		0	0	—		9	2
Portland Thorns FC	2016	NWSL	11	6	—		1	1	—		12	7
Portland Thorns FC	2017	NWSL	24	8	—		2	1	—		26	9
Portland Thorns FC	2018	NWSL	24	9	—		2	0	—		26	9
Portland Thorns FC	2019	NWSL	17	9	—		1	0	—		18	9
Portland Thorns FC	2020	NWSL	4	6	6	0	0	0	—		10	6
Portland Thorns FC	2021	NWSL	15	5	3	2	0	0	—		18	7
Portland Thorns FC	2022	NWSL	14	5	5	1	2	0	—		21	6
Portland Thorns FC	2023	NWSL	19	3	2	0	1	0	—		22	3
Portland Thorns FC	2024	NWSL	24	4	3	1	1	0	3	3	31	8
Portland Thorns FC	Total		204	82	19	4	13	3	3	3	239	92
Career total			259	100	16	3	15	4	3	3	293	110

=== International ===
Appearances and goals by national team and year
National team	Year	Apps	Goals
Canada	2000	18	15
Canada	2001	12	6
Canada	2002	10	11
Canada	2003	17	11
Canada	2004	9	6
Canada	2005	7	4
Canada	2006	17	13
Canada	2007	13	16
Canada	2008	22	13
Canada	2009	7	4
Canada	2010	16	13
Canada	2011	20	8
Canada	2012	22	23
Canada	2013	13	4
Canada	2014	11	1
Canada	2015	18	10
Canada	2016	18	7
Canada	2017	12	4
Canada	2018	12	8
Canada	2019	15	6
Canada	2020	7	3
Canada	2021	12	2
Canada	2022	11	2
Canada	2023	12	0
Total		331	190

Goals by competition
Competition	Goals
FIFA Women's World Cup	10
CONCACAF Women's Gold Cup / Championship	25
Olympic Games (Note: Includes CONCACAF qualifying rounds.)	33
Invitational tournaments (Note: Includes the Algarve Cup, Cyprus Cup, Four Nations Tournament, International Women's Football Tournament, Pacific Cup, Pan American Games, Peace Queen Cup, the Women's Cup and Yongchuan International Tournament.)	80
Friendlies	42
Total	190

Goals by opponent
Country	Goals
Mexico	17
China	12
Costa Rica	11
Jamaica	11
United States	11
South Korea	9
New Zealand	9
Brazil	8
Haiti	8
Sweden	8
Netherlands	7
Japan	6
Denmark	5
England	4
Germany	4
Guyana	4
Scotland	4
Trinidad and Tobago	4
Australia	3
Ghana	3
Greece	3
Guatemala	3
Italy	3
Norway	3
Russia	3
Uruguay	3
Argentina	2
Cuba	2
France	2
Panama	2
Portugal	2
South Africa	2
Saint Kitts and Nevis	2
Wales	2
Colombia	1
Finland	1
Great Britain	1
Morocco	1
Nigeria	1
Poland	1
Switzerland	1
Zimbabwe	1

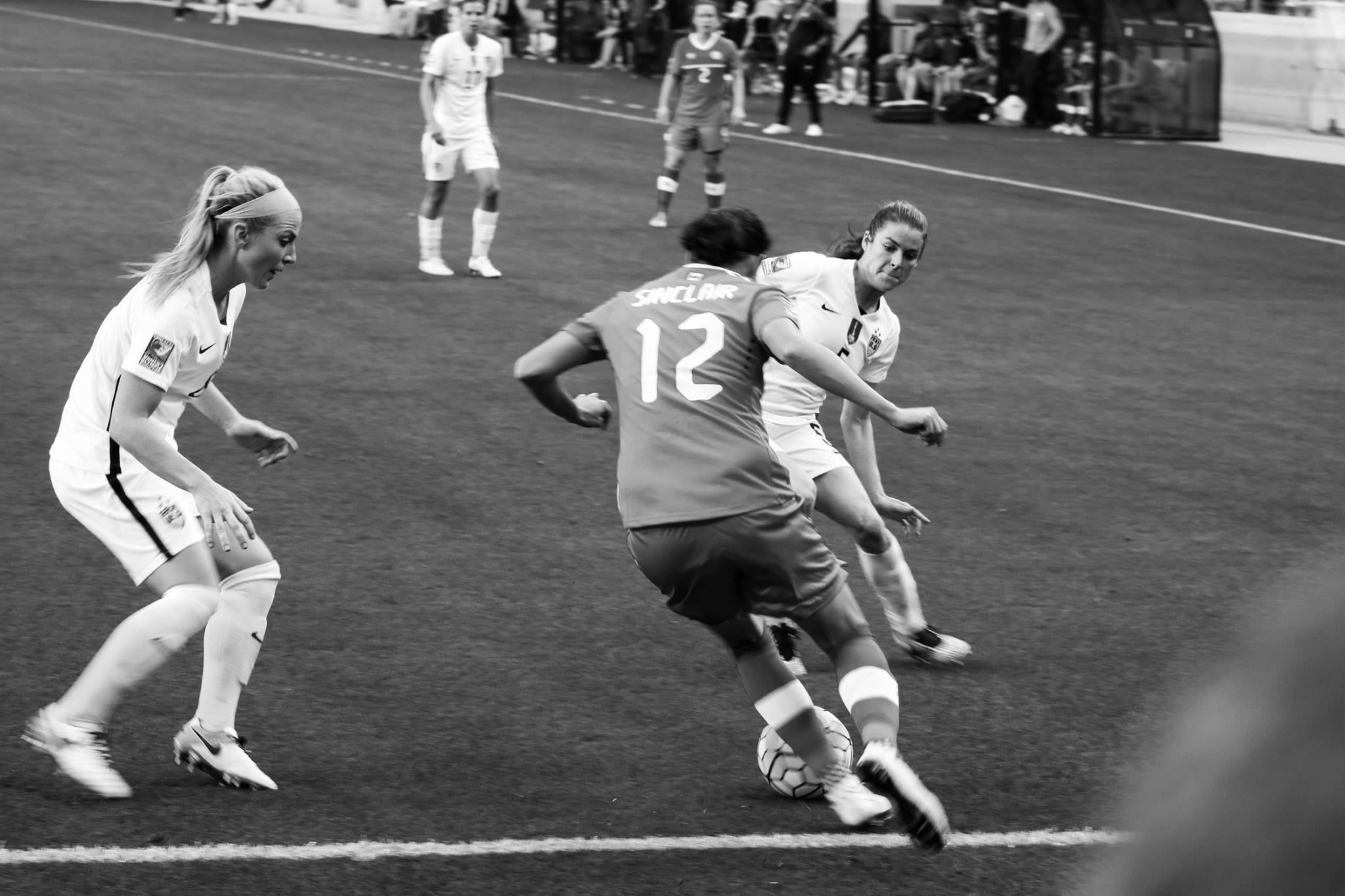
Sinclair takes on two defenders during a match against the United States, January 2017.

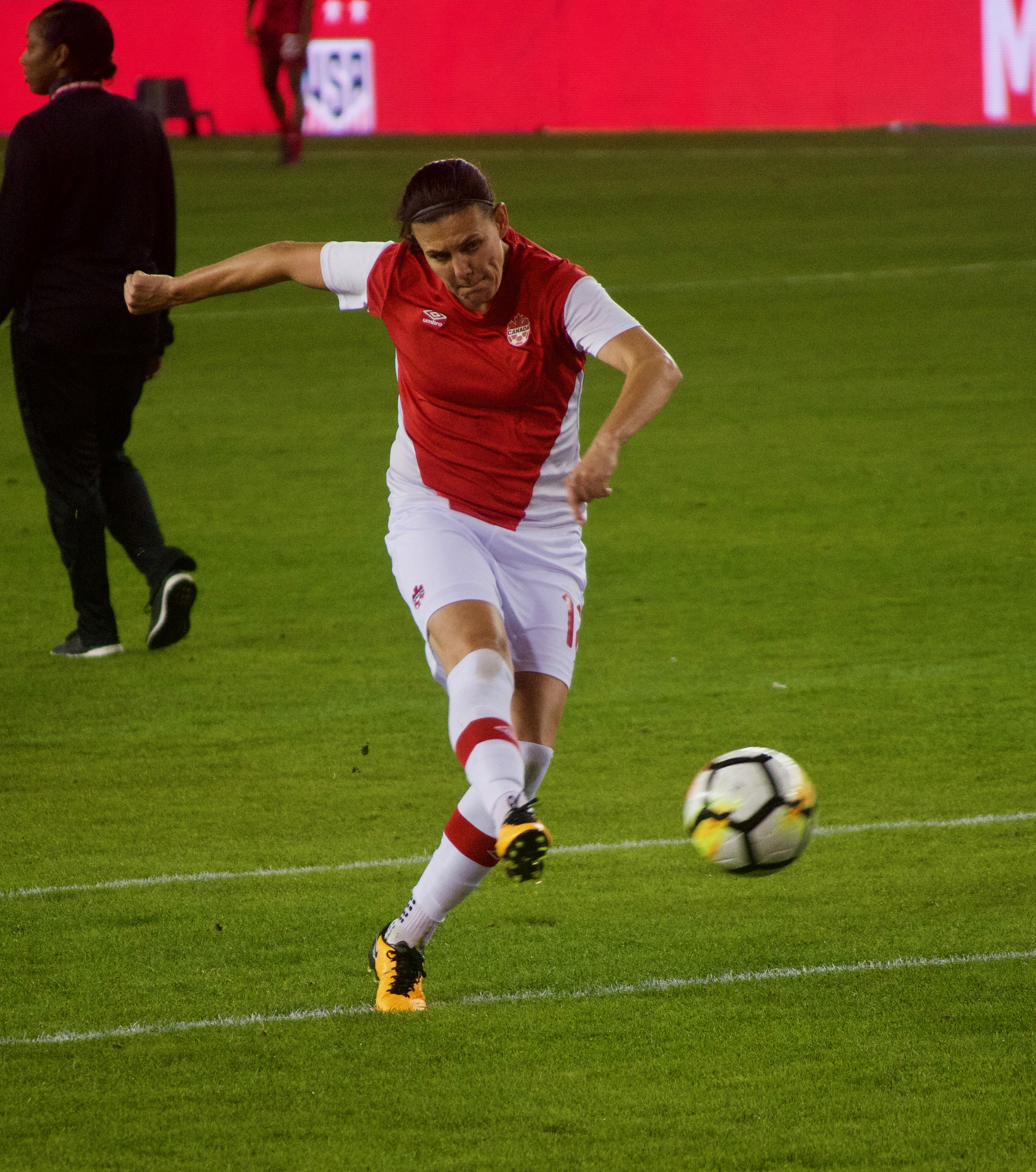
Canada captain Sinclair warms up before a match, November 2017

== Honours ==
University of Portland Pilots

- NCAA Division I Women's Soccer Championship: 2002, 2005

Vancouver Whitecaps FC

- USL W-League: 2006 USL W-League season

FC Gold Pride

- WPS Championship: 2010

Western New York Flash

- WPS Championship: 2011

Portland Thorns FC

- NWSL Championship: 2013, 2017, 2022
- NWSL Shield: 2016, 2021
- NWSL Challenge Cup: 2021
- NWSL Community Shield: 2020
- International Champions Cup: 2021

Canada

- Summer Olympics: 2021
- CONCACAF Women's Championship: 2010
- Pan American Games: 2011
- Algarve Cup: 2016
- Cyprus Women's Cup: 2008, 2010, 2011
- Four Nations Tournament: 2015

Individual

- FIFA World Player of the Year: 2002 (6th), 2005 (candidate), 2006 (candidate), 2007 (candidate), 2008 (8th), 2010 (7th), 2012 (5th), 2016 (8th)
- The Best FIFA Special Award for Outstanding Career Achievement: 2021
- Canada Soccer President's Award: 2022
- IFFHS CONCACAF Women's Team of the Decade: 2011–2020
- Summer Olympic Golden Boot: 2012
- CONCACAF Women's Gold Cup Best XI: 2002
- CONCACAF Women's Gold Cup Golden Boot: 2002, 2006
- Pan American Games Golden Boot: 2011
- FIFA U-19 Women's World Championship Golden Ball: 2002
- FIFA U-19 Women's World Championship Best XI: 2002
- FIFA U-19 Women's World Championship Golden Boot: 2002
- Algarve Cup Top Scorer: 2018
- Cyprus Women's Cup Top Scorer: 2008, 2009
- WPS Championship Final MVP: 2011
- WPS Best XI: 2011
- NWSL Second XI: 2013, 2018
- Lou Marsh Award: 2012
- Bobbie Rosenfeld Award: 2012, 2020
- Canadian Player of the Decade: 2010-2019
- Canadian Player of the Year: 2000, 2004, 2005, 2006, 2007, 2008, 2009, 2010, 2011, 2012, 2013, 2014, 2016, 2018
- MAC Hermann Trophy: 2004, 2005
- Thorns Supporters Player of the Year: 2018
- Canada Soccer Hall of Fame: 2025
- BC Sports Hall of Fame: 2025

Orders

- Order of British Columbia (OBC)
- Companion of the Order of Canada (CC)
- Queen Elizabeth II Diamond Jubilee Medal
- Order of Sport: inducted 2025

== See also ==
- List of women's footballers with 100 or more international goals
- List of women's footballers with 100 or more international caps
- List of Olympic medalists in football
- List of inductees of Canada's Walk of Fame
- List of FC Gold Pride players
- List of Vancouver Whitecaps Women players
- List of Academic All-America Team Members of the Year
- List of recipients of Today's Top 10 Award
- List of Canadian sports personalities
