= Canada v United States (2012 Summer Olympics) =

2012 Summer Olympics women's soccer semifinal
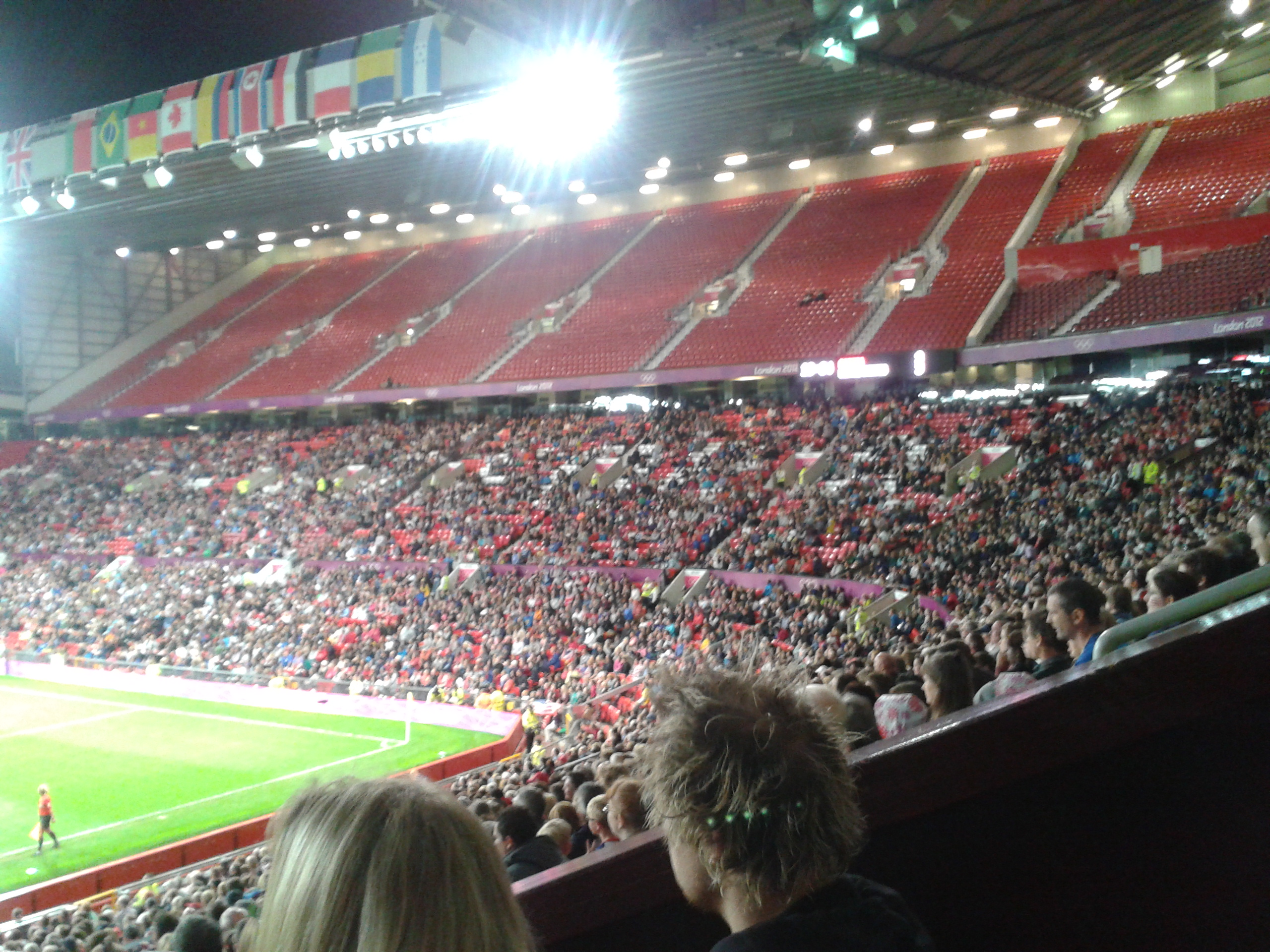
- Old Trafford in Manchester
- Event: Football at the 2012 Summer Olympics – Women's tournament
Canada	United States
(Canada)	(United States)
3	4
- After extra time
- Date: 6 August 2012
- Venue: Old Trafford, Manchester
- Referee: Christina Pedersen (Norway)
- Attendance: 26,630

The 2012 Olympic women's soccer semifinal between Canada and the United States was played at Old Trafford in Manchester, England, on 6 August 2012. In a match that went into extra time, the U.S. won 4–3 to advance to the final against Japan.

In the 22nd minute, Christine Sinclair opened the scoring for Canada, who remained up 1–0 into halftime. Nine minutes into the second half, Megan Rapinoe equalized for the U.S., scoring directly from a corner kick. Sinclair secured a hat-trick by adding goals in the 67th and 73rd minute, sandwiching a second goal by Rapinoe in the 70th minute. A controversial call against Canadian goalkeeper Erin McLeod for holding the ball longer than six seconds led to a free kick which resulted in a penalty kick being awarded to the Americans; Abby Wambach converted it in the 80th minute to tie the score at 3–3, and the game went into extra time. On the verge of a potential penalty shootout, Alex Morgan headed in the winning goal for the U.S. during the third minute of added time after the 30 additional minutes.

The game was called "the greatest knockout match in major-tournament football since 1982" by Scott Murray of The Guardian. Both teams wound up winning medals in the Olympics: the U.S. won their third straight gold medal, while Canada won the bronze medal.

== Background ==
The matchup between the U.S. and Canada was the 52nd in the history of the series. The U.S. held a 43–3–5 advantage, and they had not lost to Canada since 2001. At the previous Olympic tournament in 2008, the teams had played each other in the quarterfinal round. After ending regulation tied 1–1, with goals by Sinclair and Angela Hucles of the U.S., the Americans won in extra time following a goal by Natasha Kai, en route to earning the gold medal. At the final of the 2012 CONCACAF Women's Olympic Qualifying Tournament, the U.S. and Canada met, having already clinched places in the Olympics. The U.S. won by a 4–0 margin.

Canada opened the group stage of the tournament on 25 July against Japan, who was coming off victory in the 2011 FIFA Women's World Cup. The world champions opened the scoring in the 33rd minute on a goal from inside the penalty area by Nahomi Kawasumi. Just before halftime, Aya Miyama doubled Japan's lead with a headed goal in the 44th minute, and came close to another goal in the 51st minute, when Canada's Lauren Sesselmann was forced into a goal-line clearance. After a slow start to the game, Canada pulled a goal back in the 56th minute as Melissa Tancredi scored, but the match ended 2–1 in favor of Japan. Canada's next game was three days later against South Africa. Tangredi scored a goal in the seventh minute, and in the second half Sinclair netted twice, as the Canadians won 3–0.

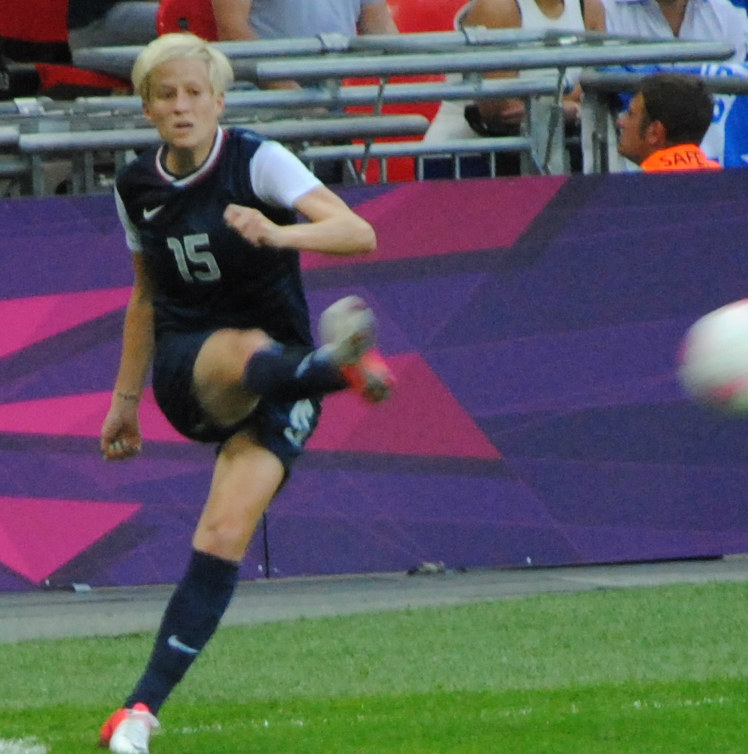
Megan Rapinoe scored once in the group stage and twice in the second half against Canada.

On 31 July, Sweden opposed Canada in the final game of the teams' group stage play, and scored twice early in the game to take the lead. Tancredi cut Canada's deficit in half near the end of the first half, and added a second in the second half as Canada secured a 2–2 draw. The team finished third in the group and advanced to the quarterfinals, having finished with the best record of any team outside the top two in their group. In that round, they faced the host nation, Great Britain, at City of Coventry Stadium on 3 August. In the 12th minute, Sophie Schmidt took a corner kick and her ball found Jonelle Filigno, who fired a half-volley shot past British goalkeeper Karen Bardsley for the first goal of the match. Later in the first half, Sinclair scored on a free kick to give Canada a 2–0 advantage, which they held until halftime. Scoring chances were limited in number for the rest of the game, and Canada won to earn a semifinal berth.

The U.S. entered the Olympic tournament as one of the favorites. They opened the group stage on 25 July at Hampden Park against France, who they had defeated in the semifinals of the previous year's World Cup. France, who had won 17 straight games entering the contest, scored twice in the opening 15 minutes, on goals by Gaëtane Thiney and Marie-Laure Delie. Later in the first half, the U.S. responded with goals by Abby Wambach and Alex Morgan, which left the game tied 2–2 at halftime. The U.S. took the lead in the 56th minute on a long-range shot by Carli Lloyd, and 10 minutes later Morgan added a second goal to give the U.S. a 4–2 margin, which proved to be the final score. Three days later, the U.S. clinched a spot in the knockout rounds by defeating Colombia 3–0. Megan Rapinoe, Wambach, and Lloyd tallied goals for the Americans.

Old Trafford played host to the last U.S. group stage game, against North Korea on 31 July. A 25-minute goal by Wambach was enough to give the U.S. a 1–0 victory and first place in the group. In the quarterfinal stage, the Americans were opposed by New Zealand. In the 27th minute, a right-footed cross from Morgan found Wambach, who slotted the ball past New Zealand goalkeeper Jenny Bindon to give the U.S. the first goal of the game. The score remained the same until the 87th minute, when U.S. substitute Sydney Leroux finished a counterattack by hitting a right-footed shot into the corner of the net, a goal that clinched a 2–0 U.S. win and a spot in the semifinals against Canada.

== Match summary ==
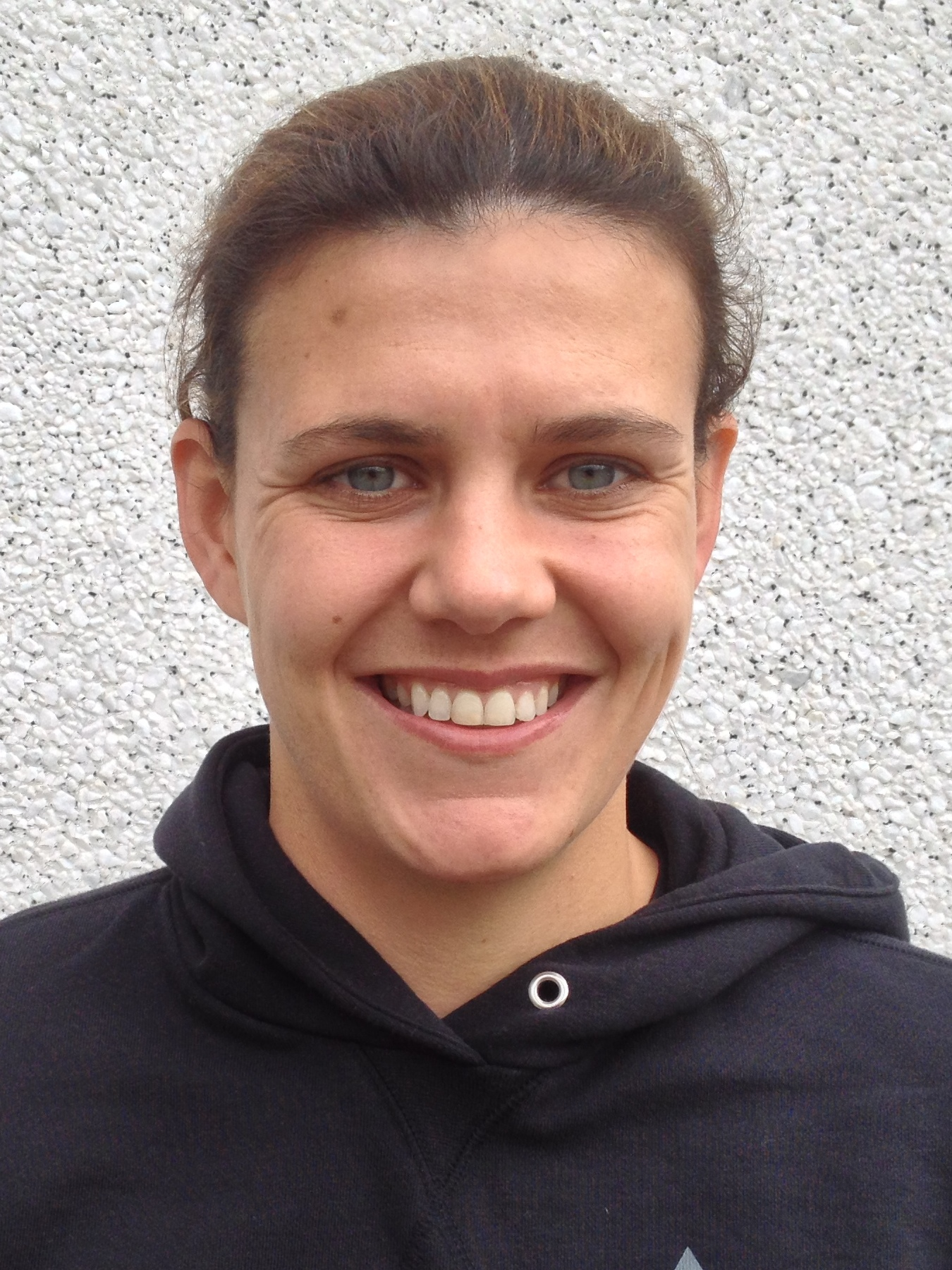
Christine Sinclair scored a hat-trick in the game.

The Canada–U.S. semifinal was held at Old Trafford in Manchester on 6 August in front of 26,630 spectators. In the opening minutes of the game, the U.S. applied pressure on the Canadian defense but managed little in the way of shot attempts. Writer Cathal Kelly described the early play as "a grind", as Canada sought to employ physical defending against the U.S. In the 22nd minute, a Canada move saw Sinclair receive a pass from Marie-Ève Nault and spin to create space in the box, where her shot beat U.S. goalkeeper Hope Solo for the match's first goal. Following the goal, Canada's midfielders began having more success beginning attacks, with less pressing from U.S. defenders than in the early stages of the game. The last couple of scoring chances of the first half fell to the U.S. In the 38th minute, Morgan went on a run on the right side of the field and crossed to Wambach, whose header went narrowly wide. Just before halftime, Lauren Cheney attempted a long-range chip shot, having noticed that Canada goalkeeper Erin McLeod was off her line, but it also went wide of the goal. Canada held a 1–0 lead going into the halftime break.

The U.S. had a chance to equalize early in the second half, as a 51st-minute cross from Morgan found Wambach, whose volley attempt went over the goal. Shortly afterward, the U.S. won a corner kick, which was taken by Rapinoe. She made the ball curl so hard that it bounced into the net along the near post to level the score at 1–1. Rapinoe's corner kick goal – known as an "Olympico" or "Olympic goal" – was the first in the history of Olympic soccer. Following the 54th-minute goal, the U.S. continued to put pressure on the Canada defense. In the 60th minute, Canada's Desiree Scott was shown a yellow card for a foul she committed to halt a U.S. attack. Having ceded control of the game for much of the second half, Canada earned a corner kick in the 67th minute. Diana Matheson's effort found Sinclair, who beat the U.S. defenders to the ball and fired a strong header into the corner of the goal. Her second goal of the game gave Canada the lead back. Three minutes later, the U.S. countered. A long pass from the left side of the field by Kelley O'Hara found Rapinoe on the right. Her attempt from outside the 18-yard box struck the far post and went into the net for her second goal, making the score 2–2. Shortly afterwards, Canada earned another corner in the 73rd minute, which was taken by Tancredi. Once again, the corner kick reached Sinclair, who beat two defenders and fired a header to the far post that completed a hat-trick.

In the 76th minute, the U.S. made a substitution when Leroux replaced Amy LePeilbet. They then won a corner kick, which was taken by Rapinoe. Her ball went to the back corner of the box and was taken in the air by McLeod. However, referee Christina Pedersen called a foul on McLeod for holding the ball in her hands for longer than six seconds without releasing it. The call, which is highly uncommon in soccer, resulted in an indirect free kick being awarded to the U.S. inside Canada's 18-yard box. McLeod had not officially received a warning in the game, but the topic of speeding up her taking of kicks had been brought up to her by an assistant referee during halftime. Wambach had started loudly counting the seconds McLeod was holding the ball in an effort to draw the referee's attention. On the free kick, Tobin Heath tapped the ball to Rapinoe, who attempted a shot. The ball deflected off Matheson and was judged to have been handled by Nault, giving the U.S. a penalty kick. Wambach's spot kick beat McLeod and went into the corner of the net, tying the score at 3–3 in the 80th minute. Both teams had quality scoring chances during the rest of regulation play. In the 85th minute, Morgan ran into the Canadian box and fired a shot. Wambach stretched out to make contact with it, but her effort went wide. After a shot by Morgan that McLeod saved, Canada had a spell of possession, which culminated in an 89th minute shot by an onrushing Schmidt from the right. The shot, from a tight angle, forced Solo into a save. Added time ended with a header by Leroux off a corner kick that went over the goal, sending the game into extra time.

The teams continued generating opportunities in the first period of extra time. Rapinoe had a shot go narrowly over the crossbar in the 92nd minute, while a Schmidt free kick in the 96th minute resulted in an overhead kick attempt by Tancredi, which was weakly struck and stopped by Solo. The U.S. had a couple of other shot attempts and controlled most of the play until halfway through extra time, but no goals were scored. In the second period of extra time, the teams maintained what The Guardian's Graham Parker called "high octane intense soccer." Wambach nearly had a potential game-winning goal in the 119th minute, when Morgan delivered a cross for her to hit a looping header while leaning back, but the attempt went off the crossbar. Going into added time, it appeared that the game was heading to a penalty shootout, but in the 123rd minute, U.S. substitute Heather O'Reilly delivered a cross into the Canadian box, which Morgan headed past McLeod into the top right corner of the goal. The strike gave the U.S. a 4–3 lead, which they held until the end of the contest.

=== Details ===
6 August 2012
19:45

Canada	3–4 (a.e.t.)	United States
Sinclair 22', 67', 73'	Report	Rapinoe 54', 70'; Wambach 80' (pen.); Morgan 120+3'

Old Trafford, Manchester
Attendance: 26,630
Referee: Christina Pedersen (Norway)

Canada	United States

GK	18	Erin McLeod
RB	7	Rhian Wilkinson
CB	4	Carmelina Moscato
CB	10	Lauren Sesselmann
LB	20	Marie-Ève Nault		(substituted off) 101'
DM	11	Desiree Scott	(yellow card) 60'
CM	8	Diana Matheson
CM	13	Sophie Schmidt
RW	16	Jonelle Filigno		(substituted off) 67'
LW	14	Melissa Tancredi	(yellow card) 79'
CF	12	Christine Sinclair (c)
Substitutions:
MF	6	Kaylyn Kyle		(substituted on) 67'
DF	3	Chelsea Stewart		(substituted on) 101'
Manager:
(United Kingdom) John Herdman

GK	1	Hope Solo
RB	5	Kelley O'Hara
CB	3	Christie Rampone (c)
CB	16	Rachel Buehler	(substituted off) 110'
LB	6	Amy LePeilbet	(substituted off) 76'
RM	17	Tobin Heath
CM	10	Carli Lloyd
CM	12	Lauren Cheney	(substituted off) 101'
LM	15	Megan Rapinoe
CF	14	Abby Wambach
CF	13	Alex Morgan
Substitutions:
FW	11	Sydney Leroux	(substituted on) 76'
MF	9	Heather O'Reilly	(substituted on) 101'
DF	4	Becky Sauerbrunn	(substituted on) 110'
Manager:
(Sweden) Pia Sundhage

Assistant referees:
Hege Steinlund (Norway)
Lada Rojc (Croatia)
Fourth official:
Hong Eun-ah (South Korea)

== Post-match ==
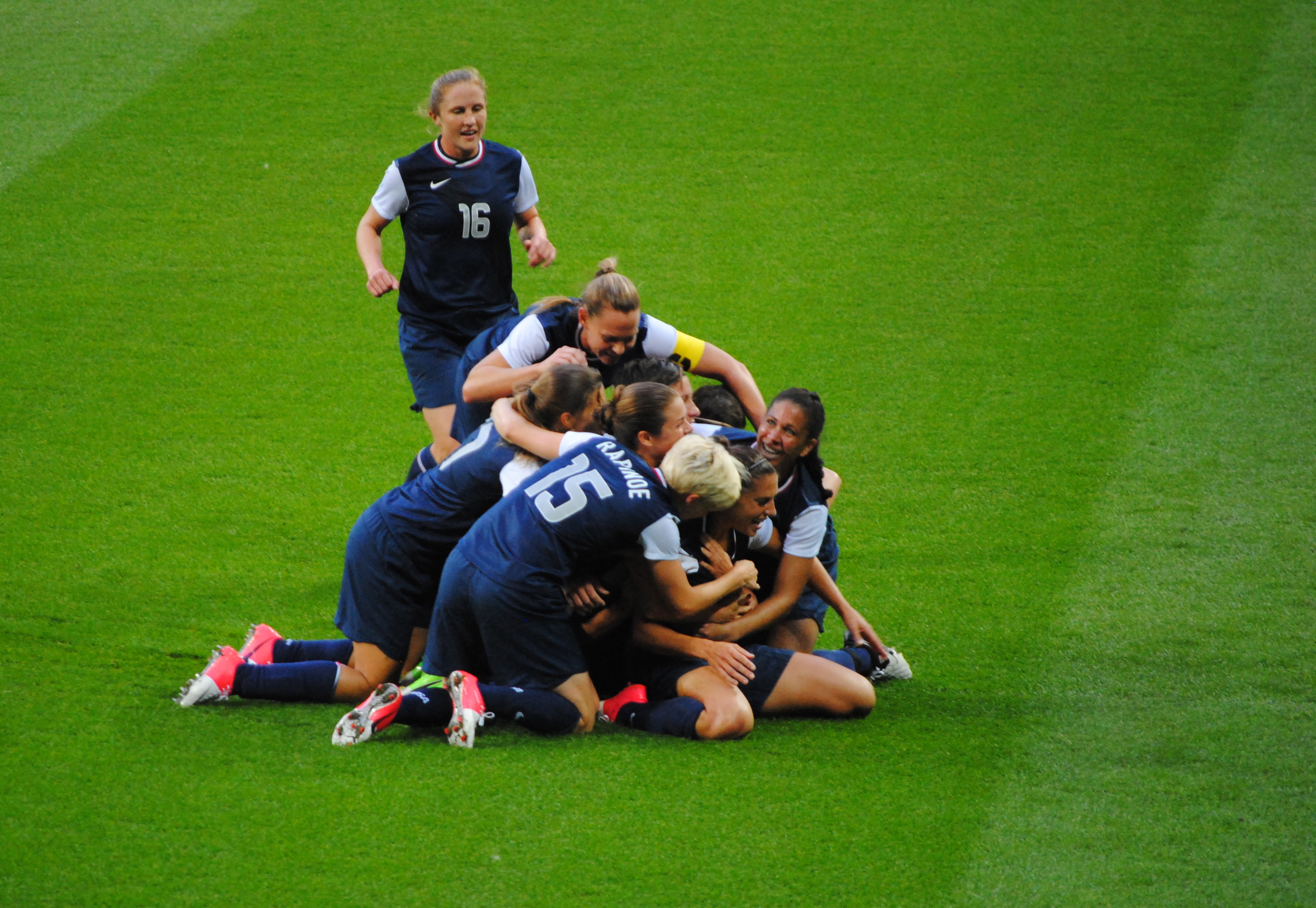
The U.S. team celebrating after winning the gold medal match against Japan.

Following the game, The Guardian's Scott Murray called the U.S.–Canada semifinal "the greatest knockout match in major-tournament football" since the 1982 FIFA World Cup semifinal between West Germany and France. Writing for the Toronto Star, Cathal Kelly called it "probably the best game of women's football ever played." A few years after the game, Kelly referred to Canada's defeat as "perhaps the most mythic, vexing, and binding" one a Canadian team had suffered.

Pedersen's foul call against McLeod proved controversial in the aftermath of the game. Murray remarked that "nobody in any form of professional football has been pulled up for [holding the ball] since the days crossbars were made out of tape". According to Kelly, Canada had been unable to recover after the call and subsequent awarding of the penalty kick. Canada head coach John Herdman was critical of Pedersen after the game, saying, "It was taken from us. The referee will have to live with it. We'll move on from this but I wonder if she will be able to." Sinclair remarked in post-match comments that she believed that Pedersen had "decided the result before it started." Following the semifinal round, she received a four-match ban from FIFA for "unsporting behaviour"; the suspension was due to comments directly made to an official after the game. Pedersen did not referee a major international match again following the 2012 Olympic semifinals.

The U.S. later faced Japan in the gold medal match. It was a rematch of the 2011 FIFA Women's World Cup Final that had been won by Japan. Behind a pair of goals by Lloyd, the U.S. prevailed 2–1 to win a third consecutive Olympic gold medal. U.S. head coach Pia Sundhage resigned in the months following the Americans' win, to accept the same position with the national team of her native Sweden.

Sinclair's suspension came after the Olympics, leaving her available for the bronze medal game. In that match, in which France opposed Canada, the Canadians won 1–0 thanks to a Matheson goal. It was the first time since 1936 that Canada earned a Summer Olympic medal in a traditional team sport. Sinclair's performance in the semifinal was called the best of her career by Kelly. In the months after the Olympics, she was awarded the Lou Marsh Trophy as her country's leading athlete.

Nine years after the 2012 game, Canada and the U.S. again played in an Olympic semifinal. From a 75th-minute penalty by Jessie Fleming, Canada defeated the U.S. 1–0. In a reversal of the London results, the U.S. won the bronze while Canada won their first gold medal. In 2024, the two teams later met in matches at the CONCACAF W Gold Cup and SheBelieves Cup that went to penalty shoot-outs, both of which were won by the U.S.
