= 2015 FIFA Women's World Cup Group C =

Football tournament group stage

Group C of the 2015 FIFA Women's World Cup consisted of Japan, Switzerland, Cameroon and Ecuador. Matches were played from 8 to 16 June 2015.

== Teams ==
Draw position	Team	Confederation	Method of qualification	Date of qualification	Finals appearance	Last appearance	Previous best performance	FIFA Rankings at start of event
C1 (seed)	Japan	AFC	AFC Women's Asian Cup winners	18 May 2014	7th	2011	Winners (2011)	4
C2	Switzerland	UEFA	UEFA Group 3 winners	15 June 2014	1st	—	—	19
C3	Cameroon	CAF	African Women's Championship runners-up	22 October 2014	1st	—	—	53
C4	Ecuador	CONMEBOL	CONMEBOL-CONCACAF play-off winners	2 December 2014	1st	—	—	48

== Standings ==
Pos	Team	Pld	W	D	L	GF	GA	GD	Pts	Qualification
1	Japan	3	3	0	0	4	1	+3	9	Advance to knockout stage
2	Cameroon	3	2	0	1	9	3	+6	6	Advance to knockout stage
3	Switzerland	3	1	0	2	11	4	+7	3	Advance to knockout stage
4	Ecuador	3	0	0	3	1	17	−16	0	

Source: FIFA
Rules for classification: Group stage tiebreakers

In the round of 16:

- Japan advanced to play Netherlands (third-placed team of Group A).
- Cameroon advanced to play China (runner-up of Group A).
- Switzerland (as one of the four best third-placed teams) advanced to play Canada (winner of Group A).

== Matches ==
=== Cameroon vs Ecuador ===
Cameroon's 6–0 win is the biggest ever win by a team in their first ever FIFA Women's World Cup match, breaking the record of Italy, who beat Chinese Taipei 5–0 in 1991.

8 June 2015
16:00 PDT (UTC−7)

Cameroon	6–0	Ecuador
Ngono Mani 34'; Enganamouit 36', 73', 90+4' (pen.); Manie 44' (pen.); Onguéné 79' (pen.)	Report

BC Place, Vancouver
Attendance: 25,942
Referee: Katalin Kulcsár (Hungary)

Cameroon	Ecuador

GK	1	Annette Ngo Ndom
RB	12	Claudine Meffometou
CB	13	Cathy Bou Ndjouh
CB	2	Christine Manie (c)
LB	4	Yvonne Leuko
CM	8	Raissa Feudjio
CM	10	Jeannette Yango	(yellow card) 38'
RW	17	Gaëlle Enganamouit
AM	20	Genevieve Ngo		(substituted off) 61'
LW	7	Gabrielle Onguéné		(substituted off) 83'
CF	9	Madeleine Ngono Mani		(substituted off) 74'
Substitutions:
FW	6	Francine Zouga		(substituted on) 61'
FW	3	Ajara Nchout		(substituted on) 74'
FW	18	Henriette Akaba		(substituted on) 83'
Manager:
Ngachu Enow

GK	1	Shirley Berruz
RB	19	Kerly Real	(yellow card) 43'
CB	3	Lorena Aguilar
CB	16	Ligia Moreira (c)	(red card) 66'
LB	6	Angie Ponce
CM	5	Mayra Olivera
CM	20	Denise Pesántes
RW	13	Madelin Riera
LW	21	Mabel Velarde		(substituted off) 45'
SS	10	Ámbar Torres		(substituted off) 54'
CF	11	Mónica Quinteros		(substituted off) 72'
Substitutions:
DF	7	Ingrid Rodríguez	(yellow card) 45+2'	(substituted on) 45'
FW	9	Giannina Lattanzio		(substituted on) 54'
DF	2	Katherine Ortíz	(yellow card) 70'	(substituted on) 72'
Manager:
Vanessa Arauz

Player of the Match:
Gaëlle Enganamouit (Cameroon)

Assistant referees:
Natalie Aspinall (England)
Anna Nyström (Sweden)
Fourth official:
Tupou Patia (Cook Islands)
Fifth official:
Katrin Rafalski (Germany)

=== Japan vs Switzerland ===
8 June 2015
19:00 PDT (UTC−7)

Japan	1–0	Switzerland
Miyama 29' (pen.)	Report

BC Place, Vancouver
Attendance: 25,942
Referee: Lucila Venegas (Mexico)

Japan	Switzerland

GK	21	Erina Yamane
RB	19	Saori Ariyoshi
CB	3	Azusa Iwashimizu
CB	4	Saki Kumagai
LB	13	Rumi Utsugi
CM	6	Mizuho Sakaguchi
CM	10	Homare Sawa	(substituted off) 57'
RW	11	Shinobu Ohno	(substituted off) 90'
LW	8	Aya Miyama (c)
CF	7	Kozue Ando	(substituted off) 32'
CF	17	Yūki Ōgimi
Substitutions:
FW	15	Yuika Sugasawa	(substituted on) 32'
DF	20	Yuri Kawamura	(substituted on) 57'
MF	9	Nahomi Kawasumi	(substituted on) 90'
Manager:
Norio Sasaki

GK	1	Gaëlle Thalmann	(yellow card) 28'
RB	5	Noelle Maritz
CB	15	Caroline Abbé (c)	(yellow card) 90+3'
CB	9	Lia Wälti
LB	4	Rachel Rinast
CM	7	Martina Moser		(substituted off) 81'
CM	22	Vanessa Bernauer
RW	16	Fabienne Humm		(substituted off) 46'
LW	13	Ana-Maria Crnogorčević
CF	10	Ramona Bachmann	(yellow card) 22'
CF	11	Lara Dickenmann
Substitutions:
FW	19	Eseosa Aigbogun		(substituted on) 46'
MF	8	Cinzia Zehnder		(substituted on) 81'
Manager:
Martina Voss-Tecklenburg

Player of the Match:
Aya Miyama (Japan)

Assistant referees:
Kimberly Moreira (Costa Rica)
Shirley Perello (Honduras)
Fourth official:
Yeimy Martinez (Colombia)
Fifth official:
Janette Arcanjo (Brazil)

=== Switzerland vs Ecuador ===
12 June 2015
16:00 PDT (UTC−7)

Switzerland	10–1	Ecuador
Ponce 24', 71' (o.g.); Aigbogun 45+2'; Humm 47', 49', 52'; Bachmann 60' (pen.), 61', 81'; Moser 76'	Report	Ponce 64' (pen.)

BC Place, Vancouver
Attendance: 31,441
Referee: Rita Gani (Malaysia)

Switzerland	Ecuador

GK	1	Gaëlle Thalmann
RB	5	Noelle Maritz	(substituted off) 57'
CB	15	Caroline Abbé (c)	(substituted off) 51'
CB	14	Rahel Kiwic	(substituted off) 72'
LB	4	Rachel Rinast
CM	7	Martina Moser
CM	9	Lia Wälti
RW	19	Eseosa Aigbogun
LW	13	Ana-Maria Crnogorčević
CF	16	Fabienne Humm
CF	10	Ramona Bachmann
Substitutions:
MF	8	Cinzia Zehnder	(substituted on) 51'
DF	2	Nicole Remund	(substituted on) 57'
DF	6	Selina Kuster	(substituted on) 72'
Manager:
Martina Voss-Tecklenburg

GK	1	Shirley Berruz
RB	7	Ingrid Rodríguez
CB	2	Katherine Ortíz		(substituted off) 46'
CB	3	Nancy Aguilar (c)
LB	6	Angie Ponce
CM	5	Mayra Olivera
CM	20	Denise Pesántes	(yellow card) 72'
RW	19	Kerly Real
AM	15	Ana Palacios		(substituted off) 69'
LW	21	Mabel Velarde		(substituted off) 79'
CF	11	Mónica Quinteros
Substitutions:
MF	17	Alexandra Salvador		(substituted on) 46'
MF	18	Adriana Barré		(substituted on) 69'
MF	8	Erika Vásquez		(substituted on) 79'
Manager:
Vanessa Arauz

Player of the Match:
Ramona Bachmann (Switzerland)

Assistant referees:
Widiya Shamsuri (Malaysia)
Sarah Ho (Australia)
Fourth official:
Gladys Lengwe (Zambia)
Fifth official:
Lidwine Rakotozafinoro (Madagascar)

=== Japan vs Cameroon ===
12 June 2015
19:00 PDT (UTC−7)

Japan	2–1	Cameroon
Sameshima 6'; Sugasawa 17'	Report	Nchout 90'

BC Place, Vancouver
Attendance: 31,441
Referee: Pernilla Larsson (Sweden)

Japan	Cameroon

GK	18	Ayumi Kaihori
RB	2	Yukari Kinga
CB	3	Azusa Iwashimizu
CB	4	Saki Kumagai
LB	5	Aya Sameshima
CM	6	Mizuho Sakaguchi	(substituted off) 64'
CM	13	Rumi Utsugi
RW	9	Nahomi Kawasumi	(substituted off) 55'
LW	8	Aya Miyama (c)
CF	15	Yuika Sugasawa	(substituted off) 85'
CF	17	Yūki Ōgimi
Substitutions:
FW	11	Shinobu Ohno	(substituted on) 55'
MF	10	Homare Sawa	(substituted on) 64'
DF	12	Megumi Kamionobe	(substituted on) 85'
Manager:
Norio Sasaki

GK	1	Annette Ngo Ndom
RB	12	Claudine Meffometou
CB	13	Cathy Bou Ndjouh
CB	2	Christine Manie (c)
LB	4	Yvonne Leuko
CM	8	Raissa Feudjio
CM	10	Jeannette Yango
RW	7	Gabrielle Onguéné		(substituted off) 72'
AM	20	Genevieve Ngo	(yellow card) 43'	(substituted off) 46'
LW	17	Gaëlle Enganamouit
CF	9	Madeleine Ngono Mani		(substituted off) 62'
Substitutions:
FW	6	Francine Zouga		(substituted on) 46'
FW	3	Ajara Nchout		(substituted on) 62'
DF	5	Augustine Ejangue		(substituted on) 72'
Manager:
Ngachu Enow

Player of the Match:
Aya Miyama (Japan)

Assistant referees:
Anna Nyström (Sweden)
Natalie Aspinall (England)
Fourth official:
Tupou Patia (Cook Islands)
Fifth official:
Bernadettar Kwimbira (Malawi)

=== Ecuador vs Japan ===
16 June 2015
16:00 CDT (UTC−5)

Ecuador	0–1	Japan
	Report	Ōgimi 5'

Investors Group Field, Winnipeg
Attendance: 14,522
Referee: Melissa Borjas (Honduras)

Ecuador	Japan

GK	1	Shirley Berruz
RB	7	Ingrid Rodríguez
CB	2	Katherine Ortíz
CB	16	Ligia Moreira (c)
LB	6	Angie Ponce
DM	3	Nancy Aguilar	(yellow card) 52'
RM	19	Kerly Real
CM	20	Denise Pesántes
CM	5	Mayra Olivera
LM	8	Erika Vásquez	(yellow card) 39'	(substituted off) 90'
CF	11	Mónica Quinteros		(substituted off) 83'
Substitutions:
FW	14	Carina Caicedo		(substituted on) 83'
MF	13	Madelin Riera		(substituted on) 90'
Manager:
Vanessa Arauz

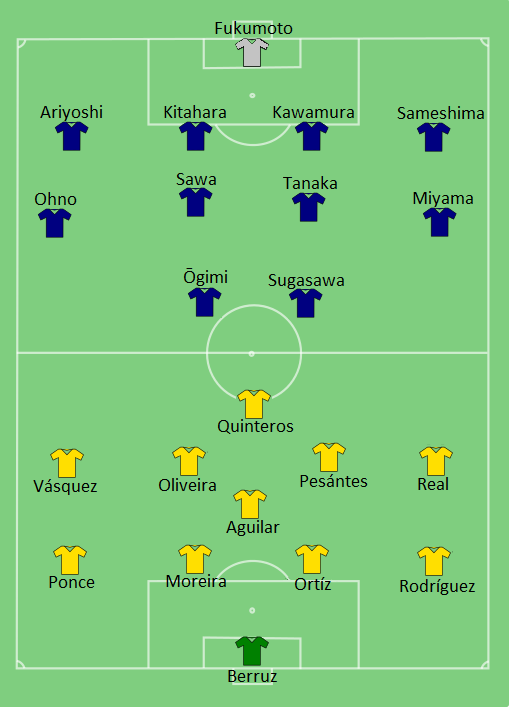

GK	1	Miho Fukumoto
RB	19	Saori Ariyoshi
CB	23	Kana Kitahara		(substituted off) 46'
CB	20	Yuri Kawamura
LB	5	Aya Sameshima
CM	14	Asuna Tanaka
CM	10	Homare Sawa
RW	11	Shinobu Ohno	(yellow card) 17'	(substituted off) 75'
LW	8	Aya Miyama (c)
CF	15	Yuika Sugasawa		(substituted off) 80'
CF	17	Yūki Ōgimi
Substitutions:
DF	12	Megumi Kamionobe		(substituted on) 46'
MF	22	Asano Nagasato		(substituted on) 75'
FW	16	Mana Iwabuchi		(substituted on) 80'
Manager:
Norio Sasaki

Player of the Match:
Aya Miyama (Japan)

Assistant referees:
Yolanda Parga (Spain)
Manuela Nicolosi (France)
Fourth official:
Quetzalli Alvarado (Mexico)
Fifth official:
Shirley Perello (Honduras)

=== Switzerland vs Cameroon ===
16 June 2015
15:00 MDT (UTC−6)

Switzerland	1–2	Cameroon
Crnogorčević 24'	Report	Onguéné 47'; Ngono Mani 62'

Commonwealth Stadium, Edmonton
Attendance: 10,177
Referee: Claudia Umpiérrez (Uruguay)

Switzerland	Cameroon

GK	1	Gaëlle Thalmann
RB	5	Noelle Maritz
CB	9	Lia Wälti	(yellow card) 82'
CB	6	Selina Kuster
LB	4	Rachel Rinast
CM	7	Martina Moser (c)
CM	14	Rahel Kiwic		(substituted off) 65'
RW	10	Ramona Bachmann
LW	11	Lara Dickenmann		(substituted off) 80'
CF	16	Fabienne Humm		(substituted off) 69'
CF	13	Ana-Maria Crnogorčević
Substitutions:
MF	22	Vanessa Bernauer		(substituted on) 65'
FW	19	Eseosa Aigbogun		(substituted on) 69'
DF	2	Nicole Remund		(substituted on) 80'
Manager:
Martina Voss-Tecklenburg

GK	1	Annette Ngo Ndom
RB	5	Augustine Ejangue
CB	11	Aurelle Awona
CB	2	Christine Manie (c)
LB	12	Claudine Meffometou	(yellow card) 68'
CM	8	Raissa Feudjio	(yellow card) 19'
CM	10	Jeannette Yango
RW	7	Gabrielle Onguéné		(substituted off) 90+2'
AM	6	Francine Zouga		(substituted off) 87'
LW	3	Ajara Nchout	(yellow card) 35'	(substituted off) 57'
CF	17	Gaëlle Enganamouit	(yellow card) 90+2'
Substitutions:
FW	9	Madeleine Ngono Mani		(substituted on) 57'
MF	19	Agathe Ngani		(substituted on) 87'
MF	18	Henriette Akaba		(substituted on) 90+2'
Manager:
Ngachu Enow

Player of the Match:
Gabrielle Onguéné (Cameroon)

Assistant referees:
Luciana Mascaraña (Uruguay)
Loreto Toloza (Chile)
Fourth official:
Yeimy Martinez (Colombia)
Fifth official:
Janette Arcanjo (Brazil)

== See also ==
- Cameroon at the FIFA Women's World Cup
- Ecuador at the FIFA Women's World Cup
- Japan at the FIFA Women's World Cup
- Switzerland at the FIFA Women's World Cup
