= Ecuador at the 2015 Pan American Games =

- IOC code: ECU
- NOC: Comité Olímpico Ecuatoriano
- Website: www.coe.org.ec

in Toronto, Canada 10–26 July 2015
- Competitors: 163 in 26 sports
- Flag bearer (opening): Jacqueline Factos
- Flag bearer (closing): Maria Sotomayor
- Medals Ranked 9th: Gold 7 Silver 9 Bronze 16 Total 32

Pan American Games appearances (overview)
- 1951; 1955; 1959; 1963; 1967; 1971; 1975; 1979; 1983; 1987; 1991; 1995; 1999; 2003; 2007; 2011; 2015; 2019; 2023

Ecuador competed in the 2015 Pan American Games in Toronto, Ontario, Canada from July 10 to 26, 2015.

Karateka Jacqueline Factos was named the flagbearer of the country at the opening ceremony.

== Competitors ==
The following table lists Ecuador's delegation per sport and gender.

Sport	Men	Women	Total
Archery	1	0	1
Athletics	7	9	16
Badminton	1	1	2
Boxing	3	0	3
Canoeing	2	3	5
Cycling	8	6	14
Diving	1	0	1
Equestrian	6	0	6
Football	0	18	18
Golf	2	2	4
Gymnastics	1	2	3
Judo	4	6	10
Modern pentathlon	2	1	3
Racquetball	2	2	4
Roller sports	1	3	4
Sailing	5	2	7
Shooting	3	4	7
Swimming	2	3	5
Table tennis	3	1	4
Taekwondo	1	1	2
Tennis	3	1	4
Triathlon	3	3	6
Water Polo	13	0	13
Water skiing	1	0	1
Weightlifting	5	4	9
Wrestling	4	4	8
Total	87	76	163

== Archery ==
Ecuador qualified one male archer based on its performance at the 2014 Pan American Championships.

Athlete	Event	Ranking Round		Round of 32	Round of 16	Quarterfinals	Semifinals	Final / BM	Rank
Athlete	Event	Score	Seed	Opposition Score	Opposition Score	Opposition Score	Opposition Score	Opposition Score	Rank
Jose Alvarez	Men's individual	635	19	E Malavé (VEN); L 1–7	did not advance				

== Badminton ==
Ecuador qualified a team of two athletes (one man and one woman).

Athlete	Event	First round	Round of 32	Round of 16	Quarterfinals	Semifinals	Final	Rank
Athlete	Event	Opposition Result	Opposition Result	Opposition Result	Opposition Result	Opposition Result	Opposition Result	Rank
Emilio Zambrano	Men's singles	Bye	Cabrera (DOM); L (17–21, 10–21)	did not advance				
Maria Zambrano	Women's singles	Bye	Solis (MEX); L (15–21, 17–21)	did not advance				
Emilio Zambrano; Maria Zambrano	Mixed doubles	—N/a	Henry / Wynter (JAM); L (21–23, 19–21)	did not advance				

== Boxing ==
Ecuador has qualified three male boxers.

Men

Athlete	Event	Preliminaries	Quarterfinals	Semifinals	Final	Rank
Athlete	Event	Opposition Result	Opposition Result	Opposition Result	Opposition Result	Rank
Segundo Padilla	Bantamweight	Bye	Lally (CAN); L 1–2	did not advance		=5
Carlos Mina	Light heavyweight	Mina (BAR); W TKO	César la Cruz (CUB); L 0–3	did not advance		=5
Julio Castillo	Heavyweight	—N/a	Julio (COL); L 0–3	did not advance		=5

== Canoeing ==
=== Sprint ===
Ecuador has qualified 5 athletes in the sprint discipline (1 in men's kayak, 2 in women's kayak, 1 in men's canoe and 1 in women's canoe).

Men

Athlete	Event	Heats		Semifinals		Final	
Athlete	Event	Time	Rank	Time	Rank	Time	Rank
Cesar De Cesare	K-1 200 m	36.378	2	—N/a		36.431	3rd place, bronze medalist(s)
Jordan González Branda	C-1 200 m	43.659	3	—N/a		42.925	4

Women

Athlete	Event	Heats		Semifinals		Final	
Athlete	Event	Time	Rank	Time	Rank	Time	Rank
Stefanie Perdomo Vinces	K-1 200 m	46.261	3	—N/a		47.415	7
Stefanie Perdomo Vinces	K-1 500 m	2:01.930	4	2:05.459	2	2:11.713	6
Maia de Cesare Ikonicoff; Stefanie Perdomo Vinces	K-2 500 m	—N/a				2:05.102	9
Anggie Avegno	C-1 200 m	—N/a				51.998	2nd place, silver medalist(s)

Qualification Legend: QF = Qualify to final; QS = Qualify to semifinal

== Diving ==
Ecuador qualified one male diver.

Men

Athlete	Event	Semifinals		Final	
Athlete	Event	Points	Rank	Points	Rank
Jonatan Posligua	3 m springboard	226.70	20	did not advance	
Jonatan Posligua	10 m platform	242.90	14	did not advance	

== Football ==
Ecuador has qualified a women's team of 18 athletes.

=== Women's tournament ===
Roster

Head coach: (Ecuador) Vanessa Arauz

The following players are on the roster for the 2015 Pan American Games.

No.	Pos.	Player	Date of birth (age)	Caps	Goals	Club
1	GK	Shirley Berruz	6 January 1991 (aged 24)	25	0	(Ecuadorian Football Federation) Rocafuerte Fútbol Club
12	GK	Andrea Vera	10 April 1993 (aged 22)	2	0	(Ecuadorian Football Federation) Universidad de Quito
2	DF	Katherine Ortíz	16 February 1991 (aged 24)	26	3	(Ecuadorian Football Federation) Rocafuerte Fútbol Club
3	DF	Nancy Aguilar	6 July 1985 (aged 30)	49	0	(Ecuadorian Football Federation) Atlético de Febrero
5	MF	Mayra Olivera	22 August 1992 (aged 22)	36	2	(Ecuadorian Football Federation) Atlético de Febrero
6	DF	Angie Ponce	14 July 1996 (aged 18)	31	5	(Ecuadorian Football Federation) Talleres Emanuel
7	DF	Ingrid Rodríguez	24 November 1991 (aged 23)	37	6	(Ecuadorian Football Federation) Unión Española
8	MF	Erika Vásquez	4 August 1992 (aged 22)	34	3	(Ecuadorian Football Federation) Unión Española
11	FW	Mónica Quinteros	5 July 1988 (aged 27)	45	8	(Ecuadorian Football Federation) Atlético de Febrero
16	DF	Ligia Moreira (c)	19 March 1992 (aged 23)	46	3	(Ecuadorian Football Federation) Atlético de Febrero
19	MF	Kerly Real	7 November 1998 (aged 16)	27	2	(Ecuadorian Football Federation) Espuce
20	FW	Denise Pesántes	14 January 1988 (aged 27)	35	3	(Ecuadorian Football Federation) Galápagos S.C.
9	FW	Giannina Lattanzio	19 May 1993 (aged 22)	14	0	(Ecuadorian Football Federation) Atlético de Febrero
13	MF	Madeleine Riera	7 August 1989 (aged 25)	34	0	(Ecuadorian Football Federation) Unión Española
14	FW	Carina Caicedo	23 July 1987 (aged 27)	9	1	(Ecuadorian Football Federation) Deportivo Quito
15	MF	Ana Palacios	16 February 1991 (aged 24)	31	0	(Ecuadorian Football Federation) Rocafuerte Fútbol Club
17	MF	Alexandra Salvador	11 August 1995 (aged 19)	14	0	(Ecuadorian Football Federation) Universidad de Quito
18	MF	Adriana Barré	4 April 1995 (aged 20)	24	0	(Ecuadorian Football Federation) Galápagos S.C.

Group B

Pos	Team	Pld	W	D	L	GF	GA	GD	Pts	Qualification
1	Brazil	3	3	0	0	12	1	+11	9	Medal round
2	Canada (H)	3	1	0	2	5	6	−1	3	Medal round
3	Costa Rica	3	1	0	2	2	5	−3	3	
4	Ecuador	3	1	0	2	5	12	−7	3	

Source: Toronto 2015
(H) Hosts
July 11, 2015
21:05

Canada	5–2	Ecuador
Beckie 12', 77'; Zadorsky 44', 48'; Fletcher 79'	Report	Moreira 29', 90'

Hamilton Pan Am Soccer Stadium, Hamilton
Referee: Alondra Arellano (Mexico)

July 15, 2015
17:35

Brazil	7–1	Ecuador
Monica 17'; Cristiane 44', 55', 67', 70', 78'; Maurine 84'	Report	Pesántes 5'

Hamilton Pan Am Soccer Stadium, Hamilton
Referee: Gillian Martindale (Barbados)

July 19, 2015
17:35

Ecuador	2–0	Costa Rica
Real 10', 90+1'	Report

Hamilton Pan Am Soccer Stadium, Hamilton
Referee: Cardella Samuels (Jamaica)

2015 Pan American Games 6th

Ecuador

== Golf ==
Ecuador qualified a full team of four golfers.

Athlete(s)	Event	Final					
Athlete(s)	Event	Round 1	Round 2	Round 3	Round 4	Total	Rank
Juan Miguel Heredia	Men's individual	73	76	71	70	290 (+2)	=13
José Miranda	Men's individual	75	74	74	79	302 (+14)	=25
Coralia Arias	Women's individual	82	78	77	74	311 (+23)	=19
Daniela Darquea	Women's individual	71	73	78	76	298 (+10)	9
Juan Miguel Heredia; Jose Andrés Miranda; Coralia Arias; Daniela Darquea	Mixed team	144	147	148	144	583 (+7)	=6

== Gymnastics ==
=== Artistic ===
Ecuador qualified 2 gymnasts.

Men
Individual

Gymnast	Event	Qualification								Final							
Gymnast	Event	Apparatus						Total	Rank	Apparatus						Total	Rank
Gymnast	Event	F	PH	R	V	PB	HB	Total	Rank	F	PH	R	V	PB	HB	Total	Rank
Daniel Gomez Barreno	Qualification	11.500	12.100	12.700	14.050	13.900	14.300	78.550	19 Q	12.900	13.350	13.900	14.250	14.050	13.600	82.050	10

Qualification Legend: Q = Qualified to apparatus final

Women
Individual

Athlete	Event	Qualification						Final					
Athlete	Event	Apparatus				Total	Rank	Apparatus				Total	Rank
Athlete	Event	F	V	UB	BB	Total	Rank	F	V	UB	BB	Total	Rank
Elid Hellwing Burgos	Qualification	12.300	11.350	11.550	12.500	47.700	25 Q	12.200	11.350	12.050	12.350	47.950	20

Qualification Legend: Q = Qualified to apparatus final

=== Rhythmic ===
Ecuador has qualified one athlete.

Individual

Athlete	Event	Final					
Athlete	Event	Hoop	Ball	Clubs	Ribbon	Total	Rank
Melissa Perez	Individual	11.858	11.075	12.250	10.775	45.958	13th

Qualification Legend: Q = Qualified to apparatus final

== Judo ==
Ecuador has qualified a team of ten judokas (three men and seven women).

Men

Athlete	Event	Round of 16	Quarterfinals	Semifinals	Repechage	Final / BM	
Athlete	Event	Opposition Result	Opposition Result	Opposition Result	Opposition Result	Opposition Result	Rank
Lenin Preciado	−60 kg	—N/a	Javier Guédez (VEN); W 100 - 001S2	Juan Postigos (PER); W 100 - 000	—N/a	Felipe Kitadai (BRA); W 100 - 000	1st place, gold medalist(s)
Fernando Ibañez	−73 kg	David Tavera (MEX); W 000S1 - 001S1	Alejandro Clara (ARG); L 010S2 - 000S2	—N/a	Juan Rosa (ESA); W 000S3 - 001S2	bronze medal match Augusto Miranda (PUR); L 000S2 - 000S1	4th
	+100 kg						

Women

Athlete	Event	Round of 16	Quarterfinals	Semifinals	Repechage	Final / BM	
Athlete	Event	Opposition Result	Opposition Result	Opposition Result	Opposition Result	Opposition Result	Rank
	−48 kg						
	−52 kg						
	−57 kg						
	−63 kg						
	−70 kg						
	−78 kg						
	+78 kg						

== Karate ==
Ecuador qualified 6 karatekas.

Men

Athlete	Event	Round Robin				Semifinals	Final	
Athlete	Event	Opposition Result	Opposition Result	Opposition Result	Rank	Opposition Result	Opposition Result	Rank
Esteban Espinosa	Men's 75 kg	Dubó (CHI); D 0–0	Icasati (CUB); L 4–5	Scott (USA); L 0–1	4	did not advance		8
Andres Loor	Men's 84 kg	Gutiérrez (MEX); W 1–0	Amargós (ARG); D 1–1	Andrade (BRA); W 1–0	1 Q	Merino (ESA); L 0–2	Did not advance	3rd place, bronze medalist(s)
Franklin Mina	Men's +84 kg	Castillo (DOM); L 6–11	Barbosa (BRA); W 8–0	de Sousa (CAN); W 12–4	2 Q	Tiril (CUB); W 9–1	Castillo (DOM); W 6–2	1st place, gold medalist(s)
Karina Diaz	Women's 61 kg	Desjardins (CAN); L 0–3	Icasati (DOM); W 4–3	Grande (PER); L 1–9	4	did not advance		7
Priscilla Lazo Nieto	Women's 68 kg	Harrigan (DOM); W 3–0	Kurita (USA); W 3-2	Brozulatto (BRA); L 0–1	2 Q	Caballero (MEX); L 1–4	Did not advance	3rd place, bronze medalist(s)
Valeria Echever	Women's +68 kg	Lugo (ARG); W 3–1	Ordaz (VEN); W 4–2	Quintal (MEX); W 8–0	1 Q	dos Santos (BRA); W 5–1	Boisvenue (CAN); W 3–2	1st place, gold medalist(s)

== Modern pentathlon ==
Ecuador has qualified a team of 3 athletes (2 men and 1 woman).

Athlete	Event	Fencing (Épée One Touch)			Swimming (200m Freestyle)			Riding (Show Jumping)			Shooting/Running (10 m Air Pistol/3000m)			Total Points	Final Rank
Athlete	Event	Results	Rank	MP Points	Time	Rank	MP Points	Penalties	Rank	MP Points	Time	Rank	MP Points	Total Points	Final Rank
David Ruales	Men's	14	=13	202	2:10.02	18	310	21	=7	279	12:12.46	4	568	1359	8
Nelson Torres	Men's	11	22	178	2:07.37	11	318	EL	0	=24	13:35.93	18	485	981	24
Dashalia Mendoza	Women's	11	=10	214	2:19.89	10	281	EL	20	0	16:34.33	20	306	801	21

== Racquetball ==
Ecuador has qualified a team of three men and two women for a total of five athletes.

== Roller sports ==
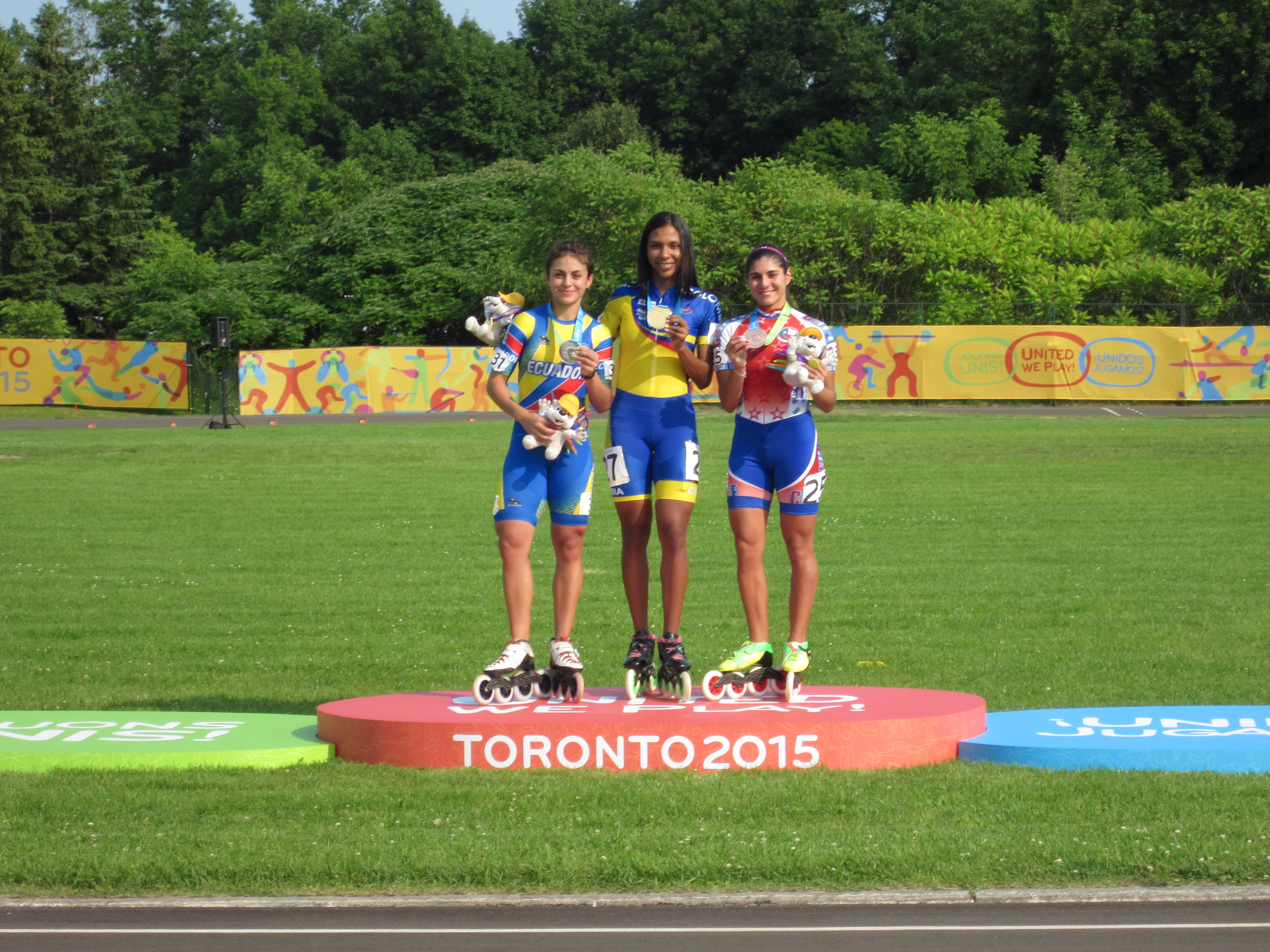
Ingrid Factos after receiving silver from the Women's 200 metres time-trial

Ecuador has qualified a total of four athletes (one man in speed, and three women, two in speed and one in the figure competition).

=== Figure ===
Athlete	Event	Short Program		Long Program		Total	Rank
Athlete	Event	Result	Rank	Result	Rank	Total	Rank
Eduarda Fuentes	Free skating	104.40	8 Q	104.70	8	418.50	8

=== Speed ===
Athlete	Event	Semifinal		Final	
Athlete	Event	Time	Rank	Time/Points	Rank
Jorge Bolanos Villacorte	Men's 10,000 m points race	—N/a		8	4
Ingrid Factos	Women's 200 m time trial	—N/a		17.994	2nd place, silver medalist(s)
Ingrid Factos	Women's 500 m	42.695	1 Q	43.875	3rd place, bronze medalist(s)
Emma Clare Townshend	Women's 10,000 m points race	—N/a		11	2nd place, silver medalist(s)

== Sailing ==
Ecuador qualified 4 boats.

Athlete	Event	Race													Net Points	Final Rank
Athlete	Event	1	2	3	4	5	6	7	8	9	10	11	12	M*	Net Points	Final Rank
Romina de Iulio Garcia	Laser Radial	16	15	15	15	14	(17)	15	15	16	14	7	16	DNQ	158	16
Jonathan Martinetti	Sunfish	2	(7)	4	3	2	5	1	2	2	4	5	7	8	45	1st place, gold medalist(s)
Édgar Diminich; Iberth Constate	Snipe	6	9	(10)	9	7	9	4	10	8	8	6	6	DNQ	82	12
Julio Vélez; Juan Santos Dillon; Maria Rodriguez	Lightning	(7)	6	7	6	7	6	4	6	7	4	2	1	DNQ	63	6

== Shooting ==
Ecuador has qualified seven shooters.

== Table tennis ==
Ecuador has qualified a men's team and a single woman.

Men

Athlete	Event	Group Stage				Round of 32	Round of 16	Quarterfinals	Semifinals	Final / BM	
Athlete	Event	Opposition Result	Opposition Result	Opposition Result	Rank	Opposition Result	Opposition Result	Opposition Result	Opposition Result	Opposition Result	Rank
	Singles										
	Team					—N/a					

Women

Athlete	Event	Group Stage				Round of 32	Round of 16	Quarterfinals	Semifinals	Final / BM	
Athlete	Event	Opposition Result	Opposition Result	Opposition Result	Rank	Opposition Result	Opposition Result	Opposition Result	Opposition Result	Opposition Result	Rank
	Singles										

== Taekwondo ==
Ecuador has qualified a team of one female athlete, and also received a wildcard to enter a male athlete.

Athlete	Event	Round of 16	Quarterfinals	Semifinals	Repechage	Bronze Medal	Final	
Athlete	Event	Opposition Result	Opposition Result	Opposition Result	Opposition Result	Opposition Result	Opposition Result	Rank
Chester Peralta	Men's -58kg	Rafael Mota Jr (PUR); W 14–13	John Maduro (ARU); L 3–4	did not advance				
Iris Carvallo	Women's -67kg	Katherine Dumar (COL); L 2–3	did not advance					

== Water polo ==
Ecuador has been reallocated a men's water polo team.

=== Men's tournament ===
The Ecuadorian men's team lost all of its matches and finished in eighth and last place.

Roster

The following is the Ecuadorian men's water polo squad.

- Garret Kaltenbach
- Kevin Mindiola Reyes
- Edwin Carrera Mantilla
- Jose Pazmiño Yepez
- Troy Kaltenbach
- Andres Benitez Pazmiño
- Jeffrey Wheeler
- Carlos Heredia Viteri
- David Valle Villamarin
- Chandler Kaltenbach
- Gabriel Moran Plua
- Astolfo Rodriguez Loaiza
- Jean Castro Gonzalez

Pool A

Team	Pld	W	D	L	GF	GA	GD	Pts	Qualification
United States	3	3	0	0	62	7	+55	6	Qualified for the semifinals
Argentina	3	1	1	1	31	29	+2	3	Qualified for the semifinals
Cuba	3	1	1	1	21	31	−10	3	
Ecuador	3	0	0	3	11	58	−47	0	

7 July 2015; 20:08	Report	United States	27–0	Ecuador	Markham Pan Am Centre; Referees: William Mackay (CAN), Edmundo Rodriguez (BRA)
7 July 2015; 20:08	Report	Score by quarters: 5–0, 8–0, 5–0, 9–0			Markham Pan Am Centre; Referees: William Mackay (CAN), Edmundo Rodriguez (BRA)
7 July 2015; 20:08	Report	Bonanni 9	Goals		Markham Pan Am Centre; Referees: William Mackay (CAN), Edmundo Rodriguez (BRA)

8 July 2015; 16:08	Report	Ecuador	8–21	Argentina	Markham Pan Am Centre; Referees: Daniel Vazquez (MEX), Thomas Molnar (HUN)
8 July 2015; 16:08	Report	Score by quarters: 4–5, 1–6, 0–2, 3–8			Markham Pan Am Centre; Referees: Daniel Vazquez (MEX), Thomas Molnar (HUN)
8 July 2015; 16:08	Report	Kaltenbach, Kaltenbach 3	Goals	Veich 5, Yanez 4, Damarchi 3, Carabantes 3, Corsi 2, Lopez 2, Monutti 2	Markham Pan Am Centre; Referees: Daniel Vazquez (MEX), Thomas Molnar (HUN)

11 July 2015; 20:08	Report	Ecuador	3–10	Cuba	Markham Pan Am Centre; Referees: Joao Cardenuto (BRA), Claudia Aguilar (MEX)
11 July 2015; 20:08	Report	Score by quarters: 1-3, 0-2, 0-2, 2-3			Markham Pan Am Centre; Referees: Joao Cardenuto (BRA), Claudia Aguilar (MEX)
11 July 2015; 20:08	Report	Kaltenbach 2	Goals	Carales 3	Markham Pan Am Centre; Referees: Joao Cardenuto (BRA), Claudia Aguilar (MEX)

Fifth-Eight place round

13 July 2015; 14:00	Report	Mexico	17–7	Ecuador	Markham Pan Am Centre; Referees: Guillermo Grgicevic (ARG), William Mackay (CAN)
13 July 2015; 14:00	Report	Score by quarters: 3-3, 3-4, 6-0, 5-0			Markham Pan Am Centre; Referees: Guillermo Grgicevic (ARG), William Mackay (CAN)
13 July 2015; 14:00	Report	O'Brien Jr. 5	Goals	Kaltenbach 4	Markham Pan Am Centre; Referees: Guillermo Grgicevic (ARG), William Mackay (CAN)

Seventh place match

15 July 2015; 12:00	Report	Cuba	13–6	Ecuador	Markham Pan Am Centre; Referees: Claudia Aguilar (MEX), Hugo Paredes (VEN)
15 July 2015; 12:00	Report	Score by quarters: 2-1, 1-3, 5-2, 5-0			Markham Pan Am Centre; Referees: Claudia Aguilar (MEX), Hugo Paredes (VEN)
15 July 2015; 12:00	Report	Carales 5	Goals	Kaltenbach 3	Markham Pan Am Centre; Referees: Claudia Aguilar (MEX), Hugo Paredes (VEN)

2015 Pan American Games 8th

Ecuador

== Water skiing ==
Ecuador qualified one athlete in the wakeboarding competition.

Men

Athlete	Event	Preliminary	Rank	Final	Rank
Jamie Bazan	Wakeboard	39.22	6 Q	48.56	8

== Weightlifting ==
Ecuador has qualified a team of 9 athletes (5 men and 4 women).

Men

Athlete	Event	Snatch		Clean & Jerk		Total	Rank
Athlete	Event	Result	Rank	Result	Rank	Total	Rank
Enmanuel Rocafuerte	−56 kg	110	4	135	4	245	4
Ricardo Flores	−77 kg	137	7	180	4	317	7
Freddy Tenorio	−94 kg	155	5	192	5	347	5
Jorge Arroyo	−105 kg	175	3	200	3	375	3rd place, bronze medalist(s)
Fernando Salas Manguis	+105 kg	170	2	200	3	370	3rd place, bronze medalist(s)

Women

Athlete	Event	Snatch		Clean & Jerk		Total	Rank
Athlete	Event	Result	Rank	Result	Rank	Total	Rank
Jennifer Lopez	Women's −48 kg	70	6	91	7	161	7
Maria Escobar	Women's −58 kg	DNF					
Neisi Dájomes	Women's −69 kg	100	2	125	3	225	2nd place, silver medalist(s)
Oliba Nieve	Women's +75 kg	115	2	142	3	257	3rd place, bronze medalist(s)

== See also ==
- Ecuador at the 2016 Summer Olympics
