= Ecuador at the FIFA Women's World Cup =

The Ecuador women's national football team has represented Ecuador at the FIFA Women's World Cup on one occasion, in 2015.

== FIFA Women's World Cup record ==
| Year | Result | Position | Pld | W | D | L | GF | GA |
|---|---|---|---|---|---|---|---|---|
| (China) 1991 | Did not enter | | | | | | | |
| (Sweden) 1995 | Did not qualify | | | | | | | |
| (United States) 1999 | Did not qualify | | | | | | | |
| (United States) 2003 | Did not qualify | | | | | | | |
| (China) 2007 | Did not qualify | | | | | | | |
| (Germany) 2011 | Did not qualify | | | | | | | |
| (Canada) 2015 | Group Stage | 24th | 3 | 0 | 0 | 3 | 1 | 17 |
| (France) 2019 | Did not qualify | | | | | | | |
| (Australia) (New Zealand) 2023 | Did not qualify | | | | | | | |
| (Brazil) 2027 | To be determined | | | | | | | |
| (Costa Rica) (Jamaica) (Mexico) (United States) 2031 | To be determined | | | | | | | |
| (United Kingdom) 2035 | To be determined | | | | | | | |
| Total | 1/12 | 0 titles | 3 | 0 | 0 | 3 | 1 | 17 |

FIFA Women's World Cup history
| Year | Round | Date | Opponent | Result | Stadium |
|---|---|---|---|---|---|
| (Canada) 2015 | Group stage | 8 June | Cameroon | L 0–6 | BC Place, Vancouver |
| (Canada) 2015 | Group stage | 12 June | Switzerland | L 1–10 | BC Place, Vancouver |
| (Canada) 2015 | Group stage | 16 June | Japan | L 0–1 | Winnipeg Stadium, Winnipeg |

=== Record by opponent ===
FIFA Women's World Cup matches (by team)
| Opponent | Pld | W | D | L | GF | GA |
|---|---|---|---|---|---|---|
| Cameroon | 1 | 0 | 0 | 1 | 0 | 6 |
| Japan | 1 | 0 | 0 | 1 | 0 | 1 |
| Switzerland | 1 | 0 | 0 | 1 | 1 | 10 |

== 2015 FIFA Women's World Cup ==
=== Group E ===
| Pos | Team | Pld | W | D | L | GF | GA | GD | Pts | Qualification |
|---|---|---|---|---|---|---|---|---|---|---|
| 1 | Japan | 3 | 3 | 0 | 0 | 4 | 1 | +3 | 9 | Advance to knockout stage |
| 2 | Cameroon | 3 | 2 | 0 | 1 | 9 | 3 | +6 | 6 | Advance to knockout stage |
| 3 | Switzerland | 3 | 1 | 0 | 2 | 11 | 4 | +7 | 3 | Advance to knockout stage |
| 4 | Ecuador | 3 | 0 | 0 | 3 | 1 | 17 | −16 | 0 | |

Source: FIFA
Rules for classification: Group stage tiebreakers
8 June 2015
16:00 PDT (UTC−7)

| Cameroon | 6–0 | Ecuador |
|---|---|---|
| Ngono Mani 34'; Enganamouit 36', 73', 90+4' (pen.); Manie 44' (pen.); Onguéné 79' (pen.) | Report |

BC Place, Vancouver
Attendance: 25,942
Referee: Katalin Kulcsár (Hungary)
12 June 2015
16:00 PDT (UTC−7)

| Switzerland | 10–1 | Ecuador |
|---|---|---|
| Ponce 24' (o.g.), 71' (o.g.); Aigbogun 45+2'; Humm 47', 49', 52'; Bachmann 60' (pen.), 61', 81'; Moser 76' | Report | Ponce 64' (pen.) |

BC Place, Vancouver
Attendance: 31,441
Referee: Rita Gani (Malaysia)
16 June 2015
16:00 CDT (UTC−5)

| Ecuador | 0–1 | Japan |
|---|---|---|
| | Report | Ōgimi 5' |

Investors Group Field, Winnipeg
Attendance: 14,522
Referee: Melissa Borjas (Honduras)

== Goalscorers ==
| Player | Goals | 2015 |
|---|---|---|
| Angie Ponce | 1 | 1 |
| Total | 1 | 1 |
