= Switzerland at the FIFA Women's World Cup =

Overview of the performance of Switzerland at the FIFA Women's World Cup

The Switzerland women's national football team has played in two FIFA Women's World Cup, in 2015 and 2023. They have qualified for the 2023 FIFA Women's World Cup.

== FIFA Women's World Cup history ==
World Cup Finals
Year	Result	GP	W	D*	L	GF	GA	GD
(China) 1991	Did not qualify							
(Sweden) 1995	Did not enter							
(United States) 1999	Did not qualify							
(United States) 2003	Did not qualify							
(China) 2007	Did not qualify							
(Germany) 2011	Did not qualify							
(Canada) 2015	Round of 16	4	1	0	3	11	5	+6
(France) 2019	Did not qualify							
(Australia) (New Zealand) 2023	Round of 16	4	1	2	1	3	5	-2
(Brazil) 2027	To be determined							
(Costa Rica) (Jamaica) (Mexico) (United States) 2031	To be determined							
(United Kingdom) 2035	To be determined							
Total	2/12	8	2	2	4	14	10	+4

FIFA Women's World Cup history
Year	Round	Date	Opponent	Result	Stadium
(Canada) 2015	Group stage	8 June	Japan	L 0–1	BC Place, Vancouver
(Canada) 2015	Group stage	12 June	Ecuador	W 10–1	BC Place, Vancouver
(Canada) 2015	Group stage	16 June	Cameroon	L 1–2	Commonwealth Stadium, Edmonton
(Canada) 2015	Round of 16	21 June	Canada	L 0–1	BC Place, Vancouver
(Australia) / (New Zealand) 2023	Group stage	21 July	Philippines	W 2–0	Forsyth Barr Stadium, Dunedin
(Australia) / (New Zealand) 2023	Group stage	25 July	Norway	D 0–0	Waikato Stadium, Hamilton
(Australia) / (New Zealand) 2023	Group stage	30 July	New Zealand	D 0–0	Forsyth Barr Stadium, Dunedin
(Australia) / (New Zealand) 2023	Round of 16	5 August	Spain	L 1–5	Eden Park, Auckland

== Record by opponent ==
FIFA Women's World Cup matches (by team)
Opponent	Pld	W	D	L	GF	GA
Cameroon	1	0	0	1	1	2
Canada	1	0	0	1	0	1
Ecuador	1	1	0	0	10	1
Japan	1	0	0	1	0	1
New Zealand	1	0	1	0	0	0
Norway	1	0	1	0	0	0
Philippines	1	1	0	0	2	0
Spain	1	0	0	1	1	5

== 2015 in Canada ==
=== Group C ===
Pos	Team	Pld	W	D	L	GF	GA	GD	Pts	Qualification
1	Japan	3	3	0	0	4	1	+3	9	Advance to knockout stage
2	Cameroon	3	2	0	1	9	3	+6	6	Advance to knockout stage
3	Switzerland	3	1	0	2	11	4	+7	3	Advance to knockout stage
4	Ecuador	3	0	0	3	1	17	−16	0	

Source: FIFA
8 June 2015
19:00 PDT (UTC−7)

Japan	1–0	Switzerland
Miyama 29' (pen.)	Report

BC Place, Vancouver
Attendance: 25,942
Referee: Lucila Venegas (Mexico)
12 June 2015
16:00 PDT (UTC−7)

Switzerland	10–1	Ecuador
Ponce 24' (o.g.), 71' (o.g.); Aigbogun 45+2'; Humm 47', 49', 52'; Bachmann 60' (pen.), 61', 81'; Moser 76'	Report	Ponce 64' (pen.)

BC Place, Vancouver
Attendance: 31,441
Referee: Rita Gani (Malaysia)
16 June 2015
15:00 MDT (UTC−6)

Switzerland	1–2	Cameroon
Crnogorčević 24'	Report	Onguéné 47'; Ngono Mani 62'

Commonwealth Stadium, Edmonton
Attendance: 10,177
Referee: Claudia Umpiérrez (Uruguay)

=== Round of 16 ===
21 June 2015
16:30 PDT (UTC−7)

Canada	1–0	Switzerland
Bélanger 52'	Report

BC Place, Vancouver
Attendance: 53,855
Referee: Anna-Marie Keighley (New Zealand)

== 2023 in Australia and New Zealand ==
=== Group A ===
Pos	Team	Pld	W	D	L	GF	GA	GD	Pts	Qualification
1	Switzerland	3	1	2	0	2	0	+2	5	Advance to knockout stage
2	Norway	3	1	1	1	6	1	+5	4	Advance to knockout stage
3	New Zealand (H)	3	1	1	1	1	1	0	4	
4	Philippines	3	1	0	2	1	8	−7	3	

Source: FIFA
Rules for classification: Group stage tiebreakers
(H) Hosts
21 July 2023
17:00 UTC+12

Philippines	0–2	Switzerland
	Report	Bachmann 45' (pen.); Piubel 64'

Forsyth Barr Stadium, Dunedin
Attendance: 13,711
Referee: Vincentia Amedome (Togo)

25 July 2023
20:00 UTC+12

Switzerland	0–0	Norway
	Report

Waikato Stadium, Hamilton
Attendance: 10,769
Referee: Stéphanie Frappart (France)

30 July 2023
19:00 UTC+12

Switzerland	0–0	New Zealand
	Report

Forsyth Barr Stadium, Dunedin
Attendance: 25,947
Referee: Tori Penso (United States)

=== Round of 16 ===
5 August 2023
17:00 UTC+12

Switzerland	1–5	Spain
Codina 11' (o.g.)	Report	Bonmatí 5', 36'; Redondo 17'; Codina 45'; Hermoso 70'

Eden Park, Auckland
Attendance: 43,217
Referee: Cheryl Foster (Wales)

== Goalscorers ==
Switzerland has scored 13 goals, two of it are own goals.

Player	Goals	2015	2023
Ramona Bachmann	4	3	1
Fabienne Humm	3	3	
Eseosa Aigbogun	1	1	
Ana-Maria Crnogorčević	1	1	
Martina Moser	1	1	
Seraina Piubel	1		1
Own goals	3	2	1
Total	14	11	3
