= 2015 FIFA Women's World Cup final =

Championship match of the 2015 FIFA Women's World Cup

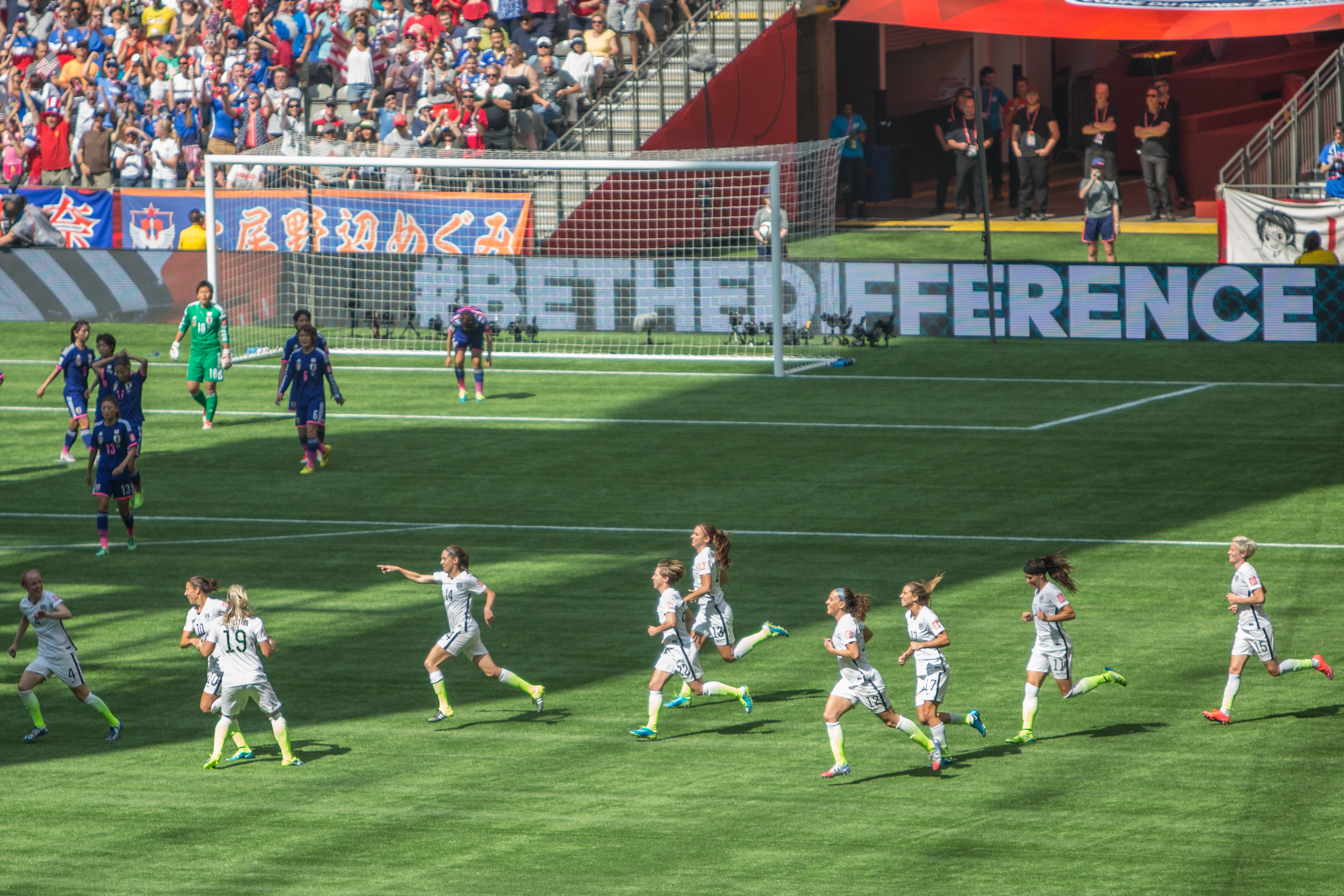
- U.S. celebrations following Carli Lloyd's opening goal
- Event: 2015 FIFA Women's World Cup
United States	Japan
5	2
- Date: 5 July 2015
- Venue: BC Place, Vancouver
- Player of the Match: Carli Lloyd (United States)
- Referee: Kateryna Monzul (Ukraine)
- Attendance: 53,341
- Weather: Sunny; 25 °C (77 °F); 50% humidity

The 2015 FIFA Women's World Cup final was a women's soccer match that took place on 5 July 2015 at BC Place, in Vancouver, British Columbia, Canada, to determine the winner of the 2015 FIFA Women's World Cup. It was played between Japan and the United States, in a rematch of the 2011 final. The stakes were high for both sides: if the United States won the match, it would be the only country to have won in three Women's World Cup finals; if Japan had won instead, then it would be the first team, men's or women's, to win twice under the same coach (Norio Sasaki for Japan) since Vittorio Pozzo led Italy to victory in the 1934 World Cup and the 1938 World Cup. Ultimately, the United States won 5–2, winning its first title in 16 years and becoming the first team to win three Women's World Cup finals.

Because of the expanded competition format, it was the first time the finalists had played a seventh game in the tournament. The United States had previously reached the final game three times, winning twice (in 1991 and 1999) and placing as runners up in 2011. This was Japan's second successive final appearance and was their attempt to be the first country to successfully defend a title since Germany in the 2007 World Cup. Both teams were undefeated throughout the tournament, with the United States only conceding one goal in the six matches leading up to the final and Japan winning all of their matches in regular time.

== Background ==
Before this tournament, the two finalists had met each other three times in World Cup play. The United States beat Japan 3–0 in the group stage in 1991 and won 4–0 in a 1995 quarter-final match, while Japan bettered the United States 3–1 in a penalty shoot-out in the 2011 World Cup final after the match was tied 2–2 after extra time. The United States won the final 2–1 in the gold medal match at the 2012 Summer Olympics. The last meeting between the two teams was at the 2014 Algarve Cup, which ended in 0–0 draw, after the previous Algarve Cup between the two teams was won by Japan 1–0. Both the United States and Japan began the 2015 Women's World Cup as favorites to win the tournament. The United States was ranked second in the FIFA Women's World Rankings, while Japan was ranked fourth.

The United States entered the 2015 final as two-time world champions, having won the first and third edition of the Women's World Cup. The United States beat Norway 2–1 in the final, with two goals from Michelle Akers. In the 1999 final, host nation United States and China played to a goalless draw. After extra time, the United States won the match with a 5–4 penalties victory.

The 2015 final was Japan's second consecutive time contesting a World Cup final. Their first win was at the expense of the United States in the 2011 Women's World Cup, held in Germany. It was also the third consecutive time that a major women's football tournament final featured Japan and the United States, after the 2011 World Cup and 2012 Olympics. This was also the first rematch of a previous Women's World Cup final.

On 30 June 2015, FIFA president Sepp Blatter announced that he would not travel to Vancouver to attend the final, leaving vice-president Issa Hayatou to present the trophy at the final to the champion.

== Route to the final ==
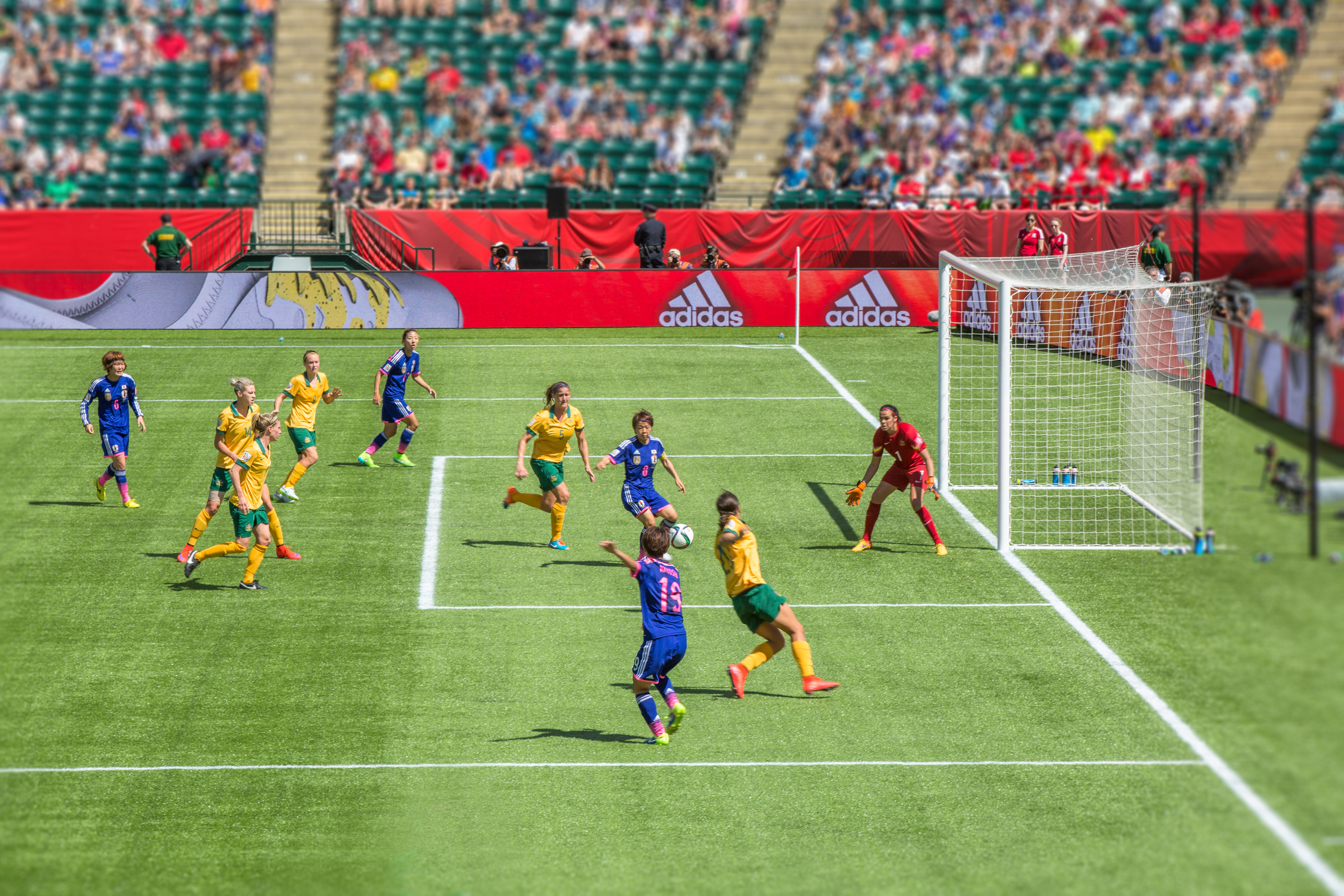
Japan's quarter-final match against Australia at Commonwealth Stadium

The United States reached the final undefeated and only conceded one goal in the six matches leading up to the final. The squad was drawn into Group D of the Women's World Cup, along with Australia, Sweden and Nigeria. The United States' first match against Australia was played at Winnipeg Stadium. After Megan Rapinoe scored an early goal, Australia managed to equalize. Two goals in the second half saw the United States take all three points in their first match. The United States played their second match against Sweden in Winnipeg. After a goalless 90 minutes, both teams walked away with a point apiece. In their final group match, the United States played Nigeria at a sold out BC Place. A single goal from captain Abby Wambach in the 45th minute was enough for the United States to progress to the round of 16 stage as group winners to face Group F third-placed team Colombia. A 53rd-minute goal by Alex Morgan and penalty converted by Carli Lloyd in the 66th minute saw the end the game 2–0. In the quarter-final, the United States took on China in Lansdowne Stadium. A goal by Carli Lloyd saw the game end 1–0. The United States were matched up against number one ranked Germany in the semi-finals. Goals by Carli Lloyd and Kelley O'Hara in the Olympic Stadium ended the match 2–0, with the United States progressing to the 2015 final.

Japan reached the final undefeated and conceded only three goals. They were drawn into Group C along with Switzerland, Cameroon and Ecuador. Japan's World Cup run started in the opening match of the tournament against Switzerland in Vancouver. A 29th-minute penalty from captain Aya Miyama secured all three points for Japan. In their second match, Japan played Cameroon. Goals from Aya Sameshima and Yuika Sugasawa gave Japan a 2–1 win. Japan's final group stage match was against Ecuador in Winnipeg ended in 1–0, thanks to a fifth-minute goal by Yūki Ōgimi. After winning their group, Japan next faced Group A third-placed team Netherlands in the round of 16. Goals at either side of the break, by Saori Ariyoshi and Mizuho Sakaguchi, saw the match end 2–1. In the quarter-finals, Japan faced 2014 AFC Women's Asian Cup Final opponents Australia in Commonwealth Stadium. An 87th-minute goal by Mana Iwabuchi was enough to ensure Japan reached the next round. In the semi-finals, Japan faced England in Edmonton. Two penalties in the first half and an own goal by Laura Bassett in the 92nd minute ended the match at 2–1 to send Japan into their second consecutive World Cup final.

United States		Round	Japan	
Opponent	Result	Group stage	Opponent	Result
Australia	3–1	Match 1	Switzerland	1–0
Sweden	0–0	Match 2	Cameroon	2–1
Nigeria	1–0	Match 3	Ecuador	1–0
Group D: Pos / Team / Pld / Pts; 1 / United States / 3 / 7; 2 / Australia / 3 / 4; 3 / Sweden / 3 / 3; 4 / Nigeria / 3 / 1; Source: FIFA		Final standing	Group C: Pos / Team / Pld / Pts; 1 / Japan / 3 / 9; 2 / Cameroon / 3 / 6; 3 / Switzerland / 3 / 3; 4 / Ecuador / 3 / 0; Source: FIFA	
Opponent	Result	Knockout stage	Opponent	Result
Colombia	2–0	Round of 16	Netherlands	2–1
China	1–0	Quarter-finals	Australia	1–0
Germany	2–0	Semi-finals	England	2–1

== Match ==
=== Summary ===
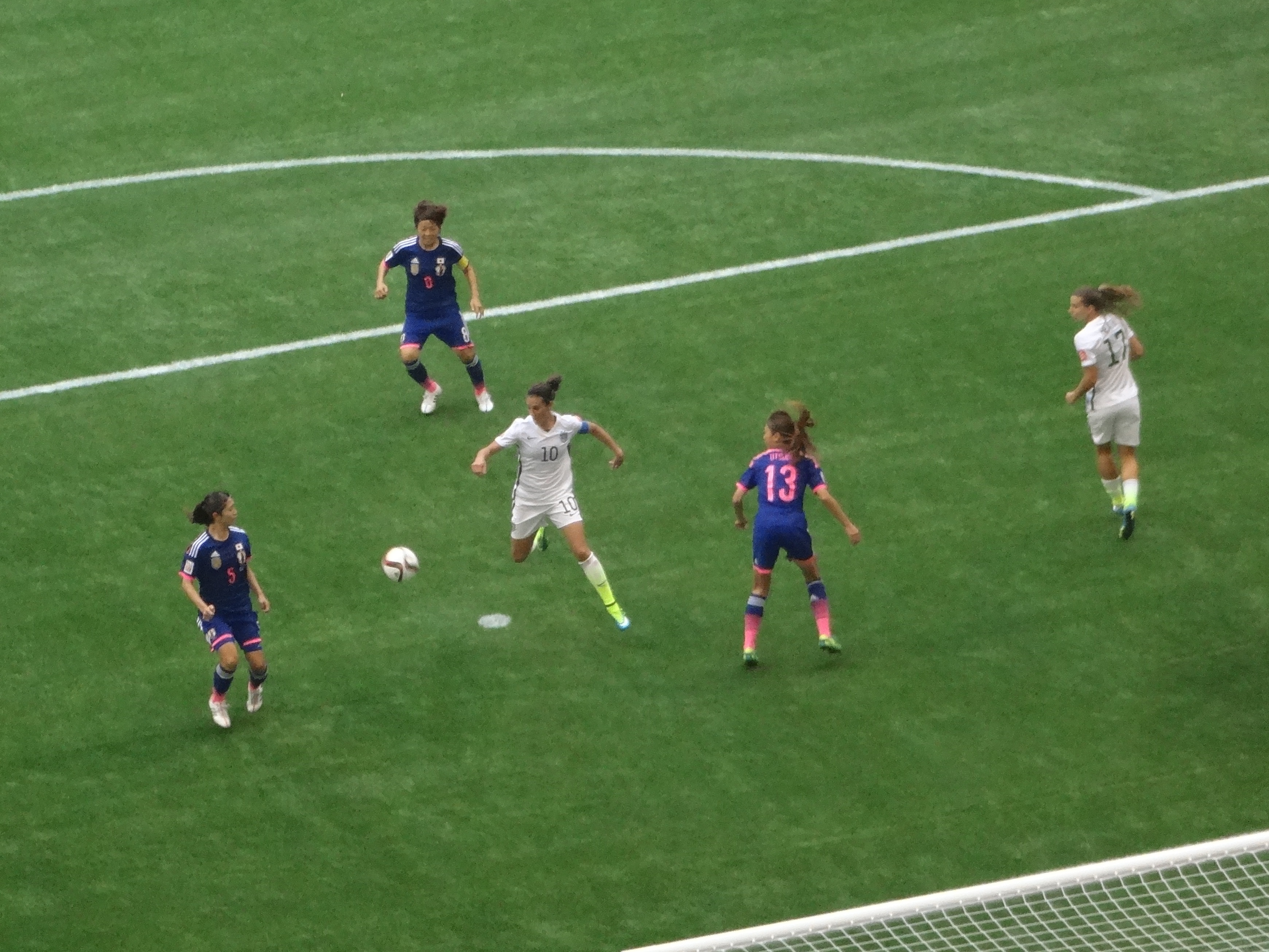
Carli Lloyd during the final

The match was played under hazy conditions due to nearby wildfires and winds that carried the smoke towards the Lower Mainland region. The United States struck early, scoring four goals in the first 16 minutes. Three of those goals were scored by midfielder Carli Lloyd, giving her the fastest hat-trick in World Cup history. Lloyd's first goal at the 3rd minute was the fastest in a Women's World Cup final, as she drove in a corner kick from Megan Rapinoe. Her goal also marked the first time Japan had trailed throughout the tournament. Lloyd again scored in the 5th minute off of a free kick from Lauren Holiday. Holiday scored in the 14th minute after Japan defender Azusa Iwashimizu failed to clear the ball on a header and turned over possession. Lloyd's goal in the 16th minute, which Reuters called "one of the most remarkable goals ever witnessed in a Women's World Cup", was struck from the halfway line, catching Japan goalkeeper Ayumi Kaihori out of position. The stunning goal was nominated for the FIFA Puskás Award and meant Lloyd became the first woman to score a hat-trick in a World Cup Final and the first player, male or female, to do so since Geoff Hurst did so for England against West Germany in 1966 at Wembley. Only one player has done so since: Kylian Mbappé for France against Argentina in 2022 in Lusail, Qatar. Lloyd's hat-trick is the only one of the three to have been completed in regular time; two of Hurst's goals and one of Mbappé's were in extra time.

Striker Yūki Ōgimi scored with a left-footed shot to give Japan's first goal in the 27th minute, outmaneuvering United States defender Julie Johnston. Japan coach Norio Sasaki then responded tactically by introducing two first half substitutes, introducing midfielder Homare Sawa on for Iwashimizu and replacing winger Nahomi Kawasumi for striker Yuika Sugasawa. An own goal off the head of Johnston from an Aya Miyama free kick added to Japan's scoreline in the second half, at the 52nd minute. Midfielder Tobin Heath scored the final goal of the game off of a pass from Morgan Brian for the United States two minutes later. The combined seven goals were the most in Women's World Cup final history and tied the record for most goals in any men's or women's World Cup Final since Brazil defeated Sweden 5–2 in Solna in 1958.

=== Details ===
5 July 2015
16:00 PDT

United States	5–2	Japan
Lloyd 3', 5', 16'; Holiday 14'; Heath 54'	Report	Ōgimi 27'; Johnston 52' (o.g.)

BC Place, Vancouver
Attendance: 53,341
Referee: Kateryna Monzul (Ukraine)

United States	Japan

GK	1	Hope Solo
RB	11	Ali Krieger
CB	19	Julie Johnston
CB	4	Becky Sauerbrunn
LB	22	Meghan Klingenberg
RM	17	Tobin Heath	(substituted off) 79'
CM	12	Lauren Holiday
CM	14	Morgan Brian
LM	15	Megan Rapinoe	(substituted off) 61'
CF	13	Alex Morgan	(substituted off) 86'
CF	10	Carli Lloyd (c)
Substitutions:
DF	5	Kelley O'Hara	(substituted on) 61'
FW	20	Abby Wambach	(substituted on) 79'
DF	3	Christie Rampone	(substituted on) 86'
Manager:
Jill Ellis

GK	18	Ayumi Kaihori
RB	19	Saori Ariyoshi
CB	3	Azusa Iwashimizu		(substituted off) 33'
CB	4	Saki Kumagai
LB	5	Aya Sameshima
RM	9	Nahomi Kawasumi		(substituted off) 39'
CM	6	Mizuho Sakaguchi
CM	13	Rumi Utsugi
LM	8	Aya Miyama (c)
CF	11	Shinobu Ohno		(substituted off) 60'
CF	17	Yūki Ogimi
Substitutions:
MF	10	Homare Sawa	(yellow card) 82'	(substituted on) 33'
FW	15	Yuika Sugasawa		(substituted on) 39'
FW	16	Mana Iwabuchi	(yellow card) 85'	(substituted on) 60'
Manager:
Norio Sasaki

Player of the Match:
Carli Lloyd (United States)

Assistant referees:
Nataliya Rachynska (Ukraine)
Yolanda Parga (Spain)
Fourth official:
Claudia Umpierrez (Uruguay)
Fifth official:
Loreto Toloza (Chile)

Match rules:

- 90 minutes.
- 30 minutes of extra time if necessary.
- Penalty shoot-out if scores still tied.
- Twelve named eligible substitutes.
- Maximum of three substitutions.

=== Statistics ===
First half
Statistic	United States	Japan
Goals scored	4	1
Total shots	9	3
Shots on target	5	3
Ball possession	49%	51%
Corner kicks	3	0
Fouls committed	7	3
Offsides	1	0
Yellow cards	0	0
Red cards	0	0

Second half
Statistic	United States	Japan
Goals scored	1	1
Total shots	6	9
Shots on target	2	1
Ball possession	47%	53%
Corner kicks	4	3
Fouls committed	7	7
Offsides	0	1
Yellow cards	0	2
Red cards	0	0

Overall
Statistic	United States	Japan
Goals scored	5	2
Total shots	15	12
Shots on target	7	4
Ball possession	48%	52%
Corner kicks	7	3
Fouls committed	14	10
Offsides	1	1
Yellow cards	0	2
Red cards	0	0

== Outcome ==
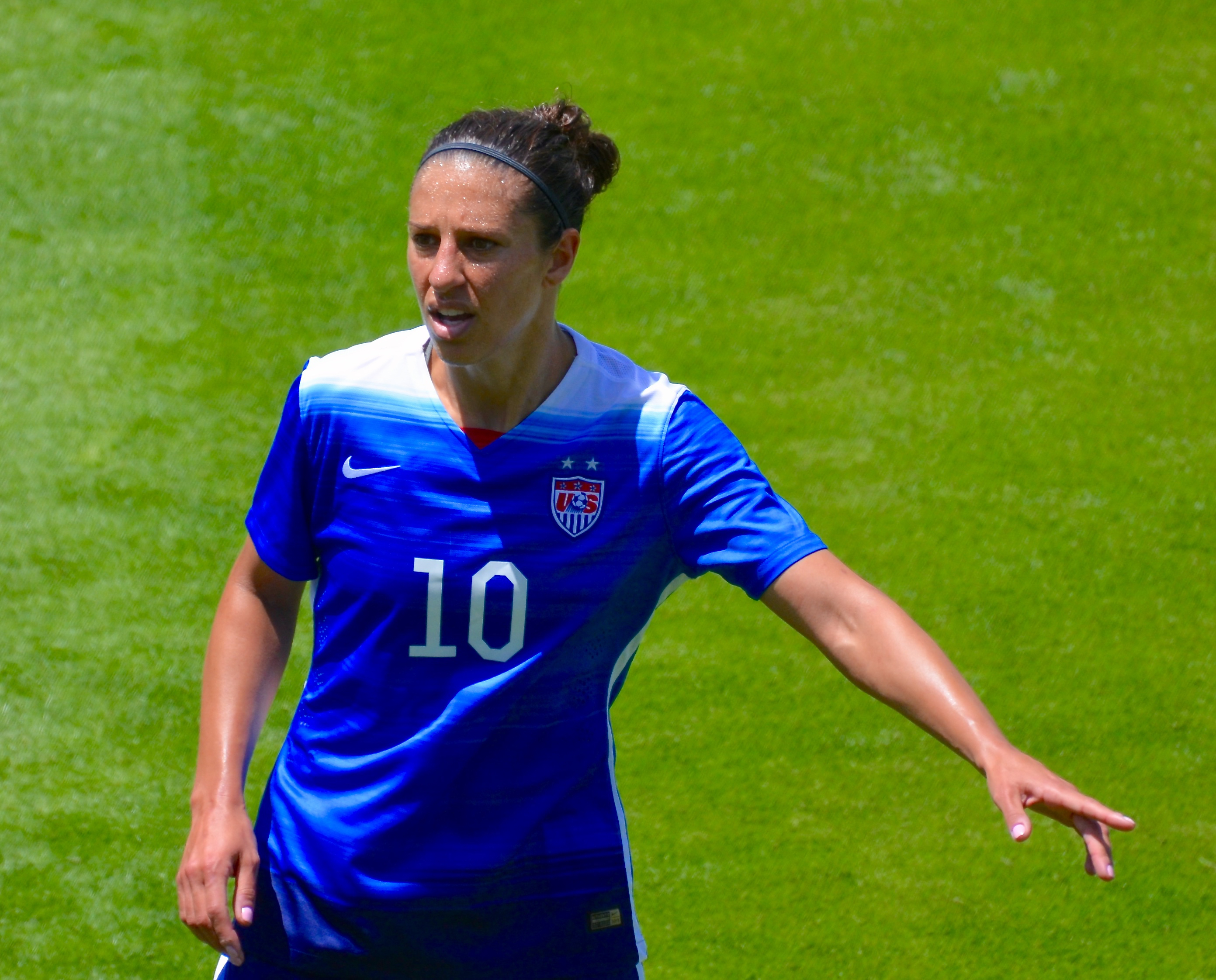
Carli Lloyd broke multiple goal scoring records in the final

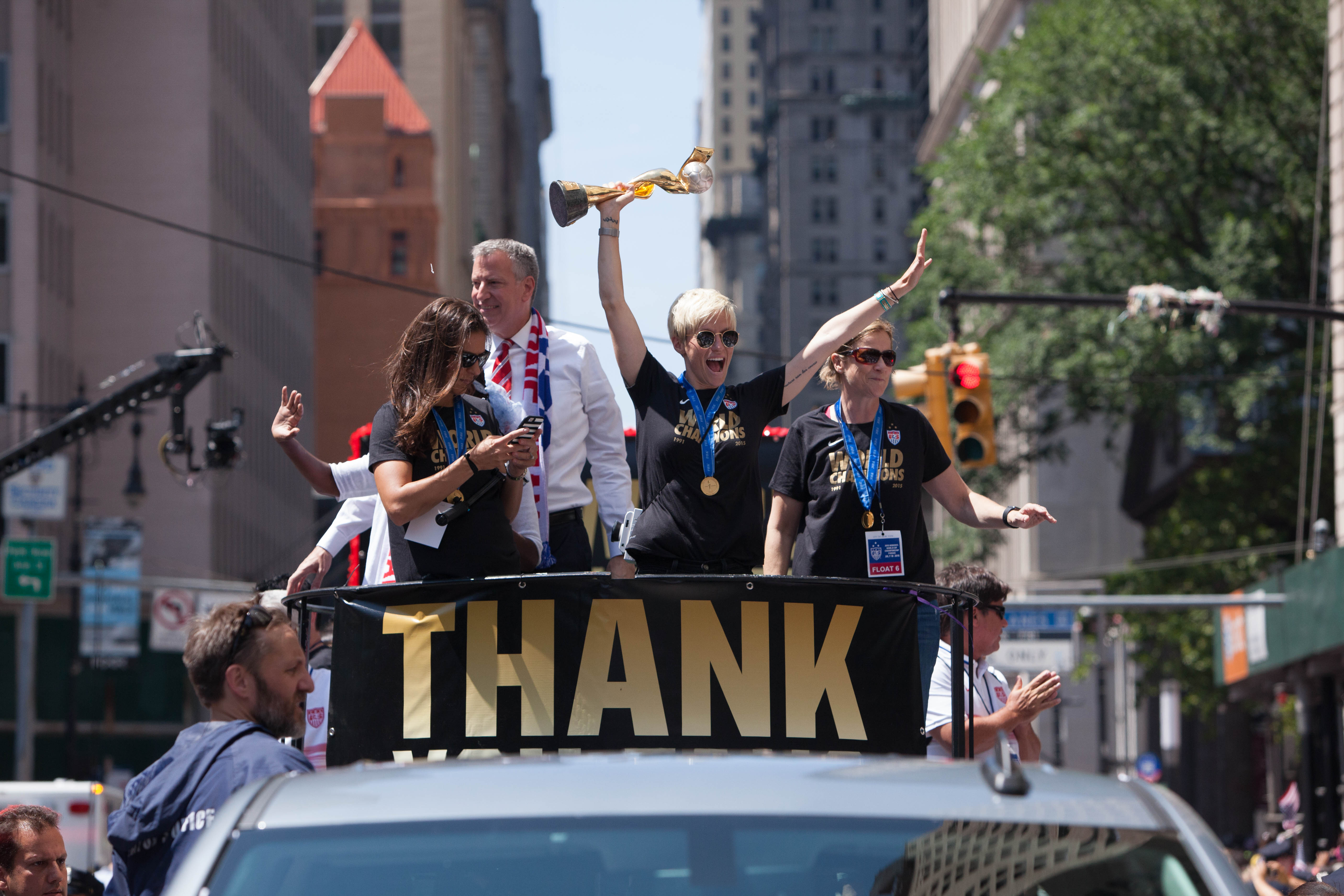
United States ticker-tape parade in New York City

The final broke multiple records. The goals by Carli Lloyd in the 3rd, 5th and 16th minutes made her the first player to score a hat trick in a Women's World Cup's Final, second in either men's or women's final and the fastest from kickoff in either men's or women's World Cup tournament. Yūki Ōgimi's goal in the twenty-seventh minute ended a United States streak at 540 minutes of not conceding a goal, tying a World Cup record of Germany in 2007. Homare Sawa, a member of the Japanese 2011 winning team, was introduced in the first half of the game. Christie Rampone, the only player remaining from the United States 1999 winning team, and Abby Wambach came on as subs late in the game. This is expected to have been the final World Cup appearance for all three. Rampone also became the oldest player to play in a Women's World Cup match, at the age of 40 years.

It also marked the first time since 1999 the United States held two major trophies in women's football (the Olympics medal and the World Cup). The United States also overtook Germany as the highest-scoring team in women's World Cup history.

The 5–2 scoreline set a record for the highest number of goals scored in a Women's World Cup final, and equaled the score of a match played between the United States and Japan at the 1988 FIFA Women's Invitation Tournament.

On U.S. television, the 2015 FIFA Women's World Cup shattered viewing records for soccer – played by men or women. With the Fox Network reporting 25.4 million viewers and Spanish-language Telemundo reporting 1.3 million viewers, the combined 26.7 million viewers made the final the most-watched soccer game in American history.

As prize money for their victory, the US team was awarded $2 million. This paled in comparison to the 2014 men's champion, Germany, who received $35 million.

On 11 July, the World Cup win was celebrated with ticker-tape parade in New York City. It was the first time a team of female athletes were honored with a ticker-tape parade in the Canyon of Heroes in Lower Manhattan, and the first ticker-tape parade in New York City to honor female athletes since Olympic Athletes in 1984. At the parade, Mayor Bill de Blasio handed the team keys to the city at a ceremony at City Hall.

== See also ==
- Japan–United States women's soccer rivalry
- Japan at the FIFA Women's World Cup
- United States at the FIFA Women's World Cup
