= Agathe Ngani =

Cameroonian footballer

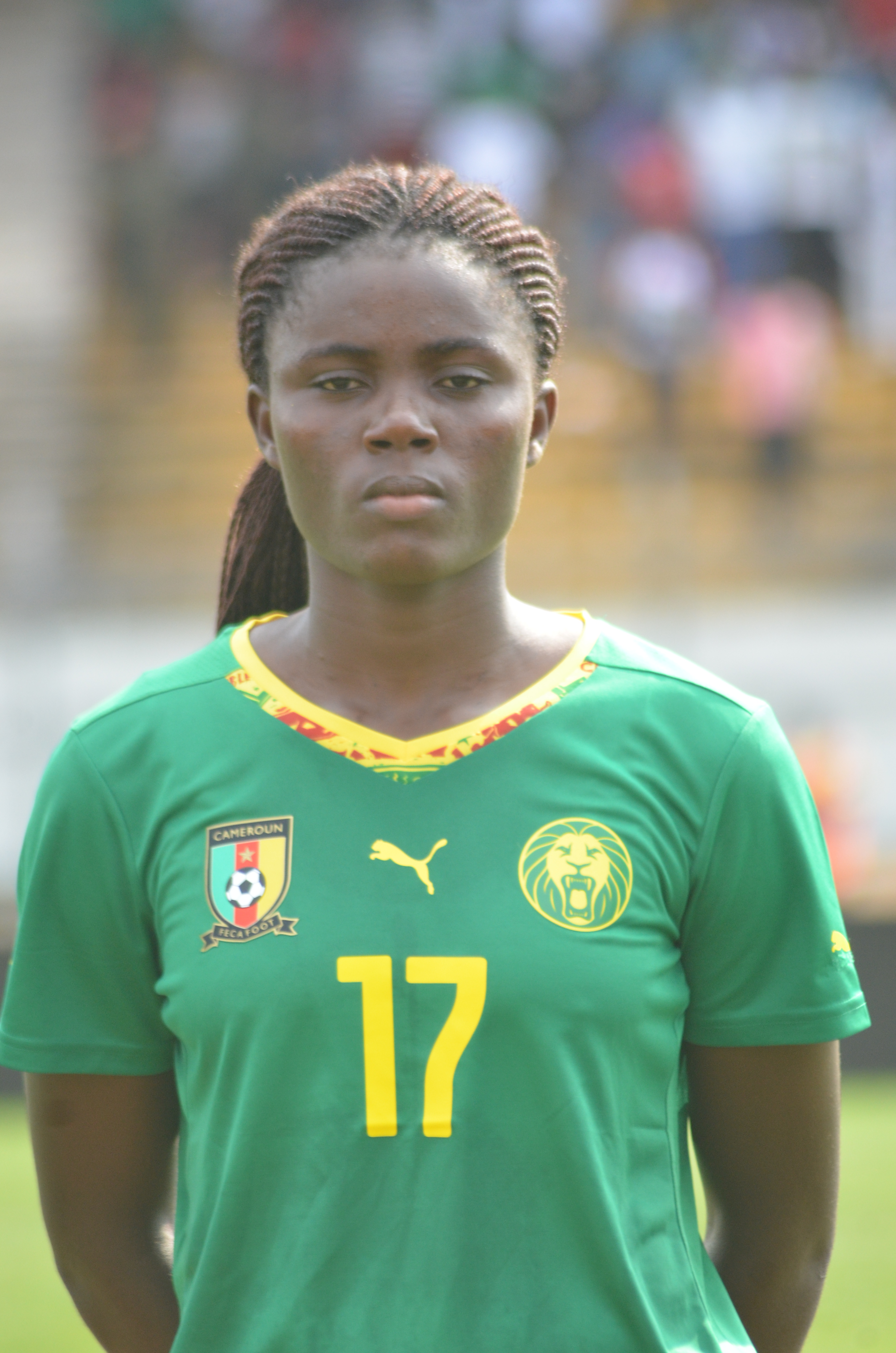

Personal information
- Full name: Agathe Georgette Ngani
- Date of birth: 26 May 1992 (age 34)
- Place of birth: Cameroon
- Height: 1.74 m (5 ft 9 in)
- Position: Midfielder

International career^{‡}
Years	Team	Apps	(Gls)
2015	Cameroon	4	(0)
- ‡ National team caps and goals as of 17:07, 23 June 2015 (UTC)

Agathe Georgette Ngani (born 26 May 1992) is a Cameroonian football midfielder.

As a tall and strong central midfielder, Ngani is nicknamed Yaya Touré after the male footballer from Ivory Coast. She has played for Scorpion du Moungo, AS Locomotive de Yaoundé and Louves Miniproff de Yaoundé.

Ngani was deemed too inexperienced to be selected in Cameroon's squad for the 2014 African Women's Championship, but made her national team debut in April 2015.
