= Lorena Aguilar =

Ecuadorian footballer (born 1985)

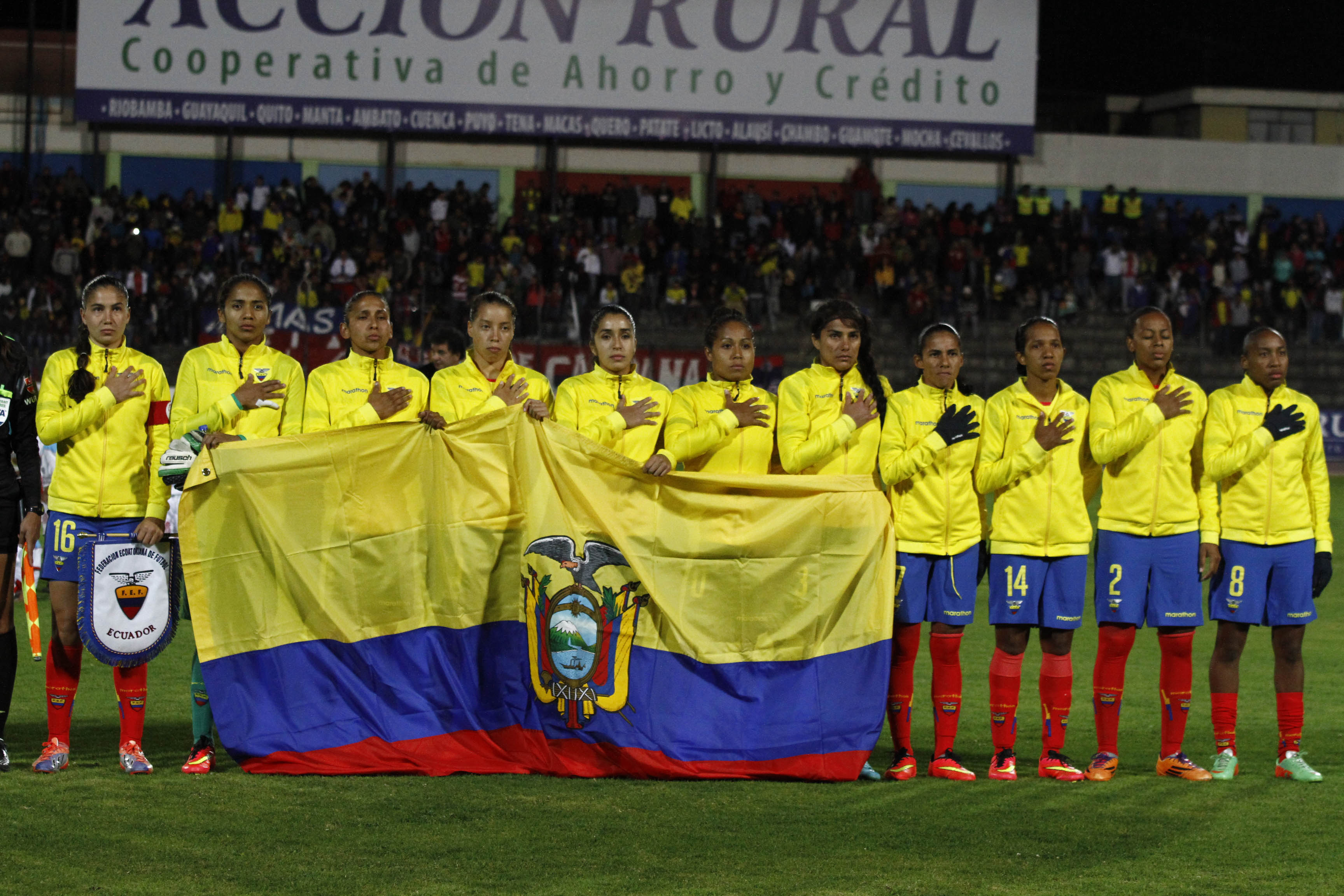
- Aguilar representing Ecuador at the 2014 Copa América Femenina

Personal information
- Full name: Nancy Lorena Aguilar Murillo
- Date of birth: 6 July 1985 (age 41)
- Place of birth: Quevedo, Ecuador
- Height: 1.64 m (5 ft 4 1/2 in)
- Position: Defender

Team information
- Current team: 7 de Febrero

Senior career*
Years	Team	Apps	(Gls)
2002–2006	La Troncal		
2006	Pichincha selection	6	(1)
2007–2010	La Troncal	2	(0)
2010–2013	Los Rios selection		
2011	→ LDU Quito (loan)		
2013–	7 de Febrero		

International career^{‡}
2003–2015	Ecuador	49	(0)
- * Club domestic league appearances and goals as of 18:44, 22 June 2015 (UTC) ‡ National team caps and goals as of 15:28, 17 June 2015 (UTC)

Nancy Lorena Aguilar Murillo (born 6 July 1985), known as Lorena Aguilar, is an Ecuadorian professional footballer who plays for 7 de Febrero. She was part of the Ecuadorian squad for the 2015 FIFA Women's World Cup.

With Ecuador team captain Ligia Moreira suspended for their second match of the tournament against Switzerland, after being dismissed with a red card in the first match against Cameroon, Aguilar captained the side which lost the match 10–1 to the Swiss.
