= Selina Kuster =

Swiss footballer (born 1991)

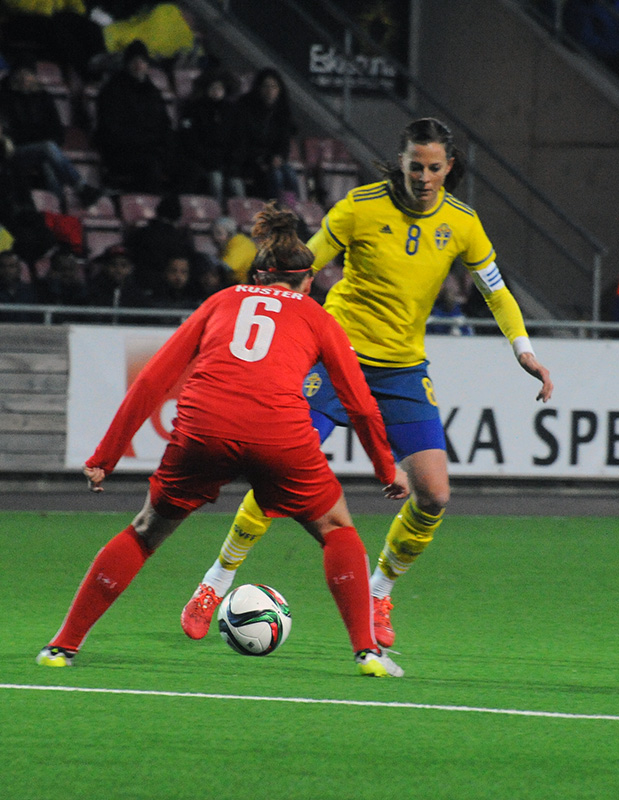
- Kuster (6) defends Sweden's Lotta Schelin in April 2015

Personal information
- Full name: Selina Annamaria Kuster
- Date of birth: 8 August 1991 (age 35)
- Place of birth: Uznach, Switzerland
- Height: 1.72 m (5 ft 8 in)
- Position: Defender

Senior career*
Years	Team	Apps	(Gls)
2005–2008	St. Gallen		
2008–2014	Grasshopper	72	(11)
2014–2018	FC Zürich	51	(19)

International career^{‡}
2009–2017	Switzerland	62	(1)
- * Club domestic league appearances and goals as of 13:40, 5 June 2015 (UTC) ‡ National team caps and goals as of 20:03, 23 June 2015 (UTC)

Selina Annamaria Kuster (born 8 August 1991) is a Swiss former footballer who played as a defender.

She has been a member of the Swiss national team since 2009. As an under-20 international she played the 2010 U-20 World Cup.
