= Cathy Bou Ndjouh =

Cameroonian football defender

Personal information
- Full name: Cathy Bou Ndjouh
- Date of birth: 7 November 1987 (age 39)
- Place of birth: Douala, Cameroon
- Height: 1.71 m (5 ft 7 in)
- Position: Defender

Team information
- Current team: FC Minsk

Senior career*
Years	Team	Apps	(Gls)
2015–2018	FC Minsk	2	(0)
2018-????	Rivers Angels F.C.		

International career^{‡}
	Cameroon	54	(0)
- * Club domestic league appearances and goals as of 20:50, 9 June 2015 (UTC) ‡ National team caps and goals as of 16:53, 23 June 2015 (UTC)

Cathy Bou Ndjouh (born 7 November 1987) is a Cameroonian footballer who plays as a defender. She had played for Nigerian club Rivers Angels F.C. who were the Champions and Cup winners of the Nigerian Female Football League 2014.

== Honours ==
FC Minsk

Winner

- Belarusian Women's Super Cup: 2015
