= Mayra Olvera =

Ecuadorian footballer (born 1992)

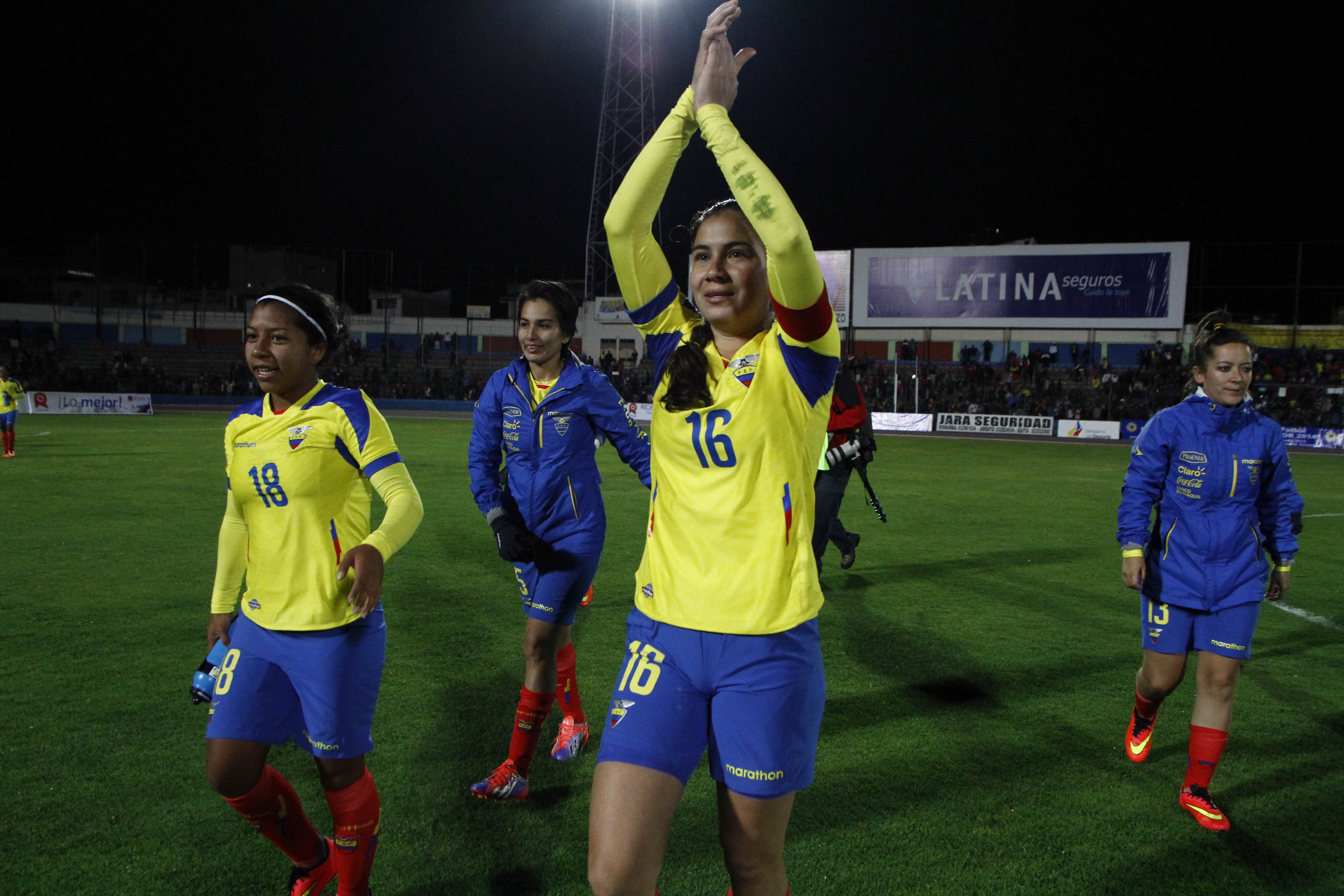
- Olvera representing Ecuador at the 2014 Copa América Femenina

Personal information
- Full name: Mayra Fabiola Olvera Reyes
- Date of birth: 22 August 1992 (age 34)
- Place of birth: Valencia, Ecuador
- Height: 1.68 m (5 ft 6 in)
- Position: Midfielder

Team information
- Current team: Dragonas IDV
- Number: 8

Youth career
- 2007–2010: Los Rios selection

Senior career*
Years	Team	Apps	(Gls)
2010	Pichincha selection	6	(2)
2011–2013	ESPE		
2011	→ LDU Quito (loan)		
2013	Los Rios selection		
2013–2014	Rocafuerte FC		
2014–2018	7 de Febrero		
2017	→ Deportivo Pasto (loan)		
2018	Unión Española		
2018	Patriotas		
2018–2019	Friol Lugo		
2019	Independiente del Valle	14	(3)
2019–2020	Sporting Gijón	11	(1)
2022	Dragonas IDV		
2023–2024	Club Ñañas		

International career^{‡}
2008	Ecuador U17		
2014-2018	Ecuador	36	(2)
- * Club domestic league appearances and goals as of 1 March 2020 ‡ National team caps and goals as of 15:31, 17 June 2015 (UTC)

Mayra Fabiola Olvera Reyes (born 22 August 1992) is an Ecuadorian footballer who plays as a midfielder. She was part of the Ecuadorian squad for the 2015 FIFA Women's World Cup.

== International career ==
Olvera represented Ecuador at the 2008 South American U-17 Women's Championship.
