= Vanessa Arauz =

Ecuadorian football manager

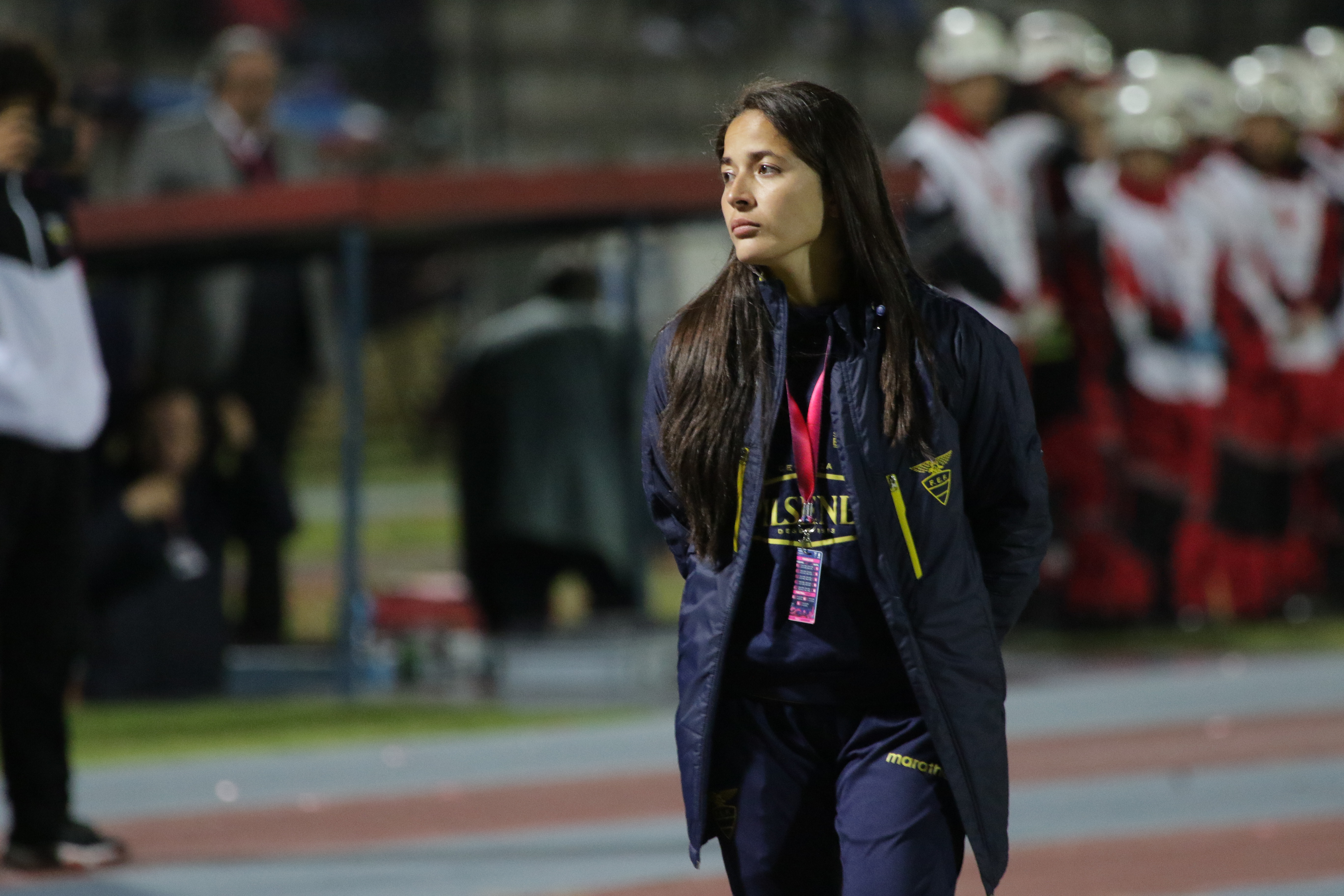

Personal information
- Full name: Vanessa Arauz León
- Date of birth: 5 February 1989 (age 37)
- Place of birth: Ecuador

Team information
- Current team: Chile U17 (women) (manager)

Managerial career
- Years: Team
- 2014–2017: Ecuador (women)
- 2020: Colo-Colo (women)
- 2021: Independiente del Valle (women)
- 2022–2024: Universidad Católica (youth) (women)
- 2024–: Chile U17 (women)

Vanessa Arauz León (born 5 February 1989) is an Ecuadorian football manager. She is currently the manager of the Chile women's national under-17 team.

== Career ==
Arauz was the head coach of the Chilean club Colo-Colo women's team until 2020. She was the head coach of Ecuador at the 2015 FIFA Women's World Cup at 26 years old, hired at age 24, setting a world record for youngest coach at a Men's or Women's FIFA World Cup. In the 2015 FIFA World Cup, Ecuador finished last, only scoring one goal. Most federations might have fired the coach after a score that low, especially a female coach. Surprisingly, the federation retained Arauz for the women's national program at all levels. By 2017, she was coaching all women's teams for the federation and was named an official instructor by CONMEBOL. In that position, Arauz travelled to provide assistance and training to women's programs throughout South America. Through the efforts of the federation, Arauz proved to be the face of change within Latin America and women's rights, specifically within football.

On 28 June 2024, she was announced as the manager of the Chile women's national under-17 team.
