= Katherine Ortiz =

Ecuadorian footballer (born 1991)

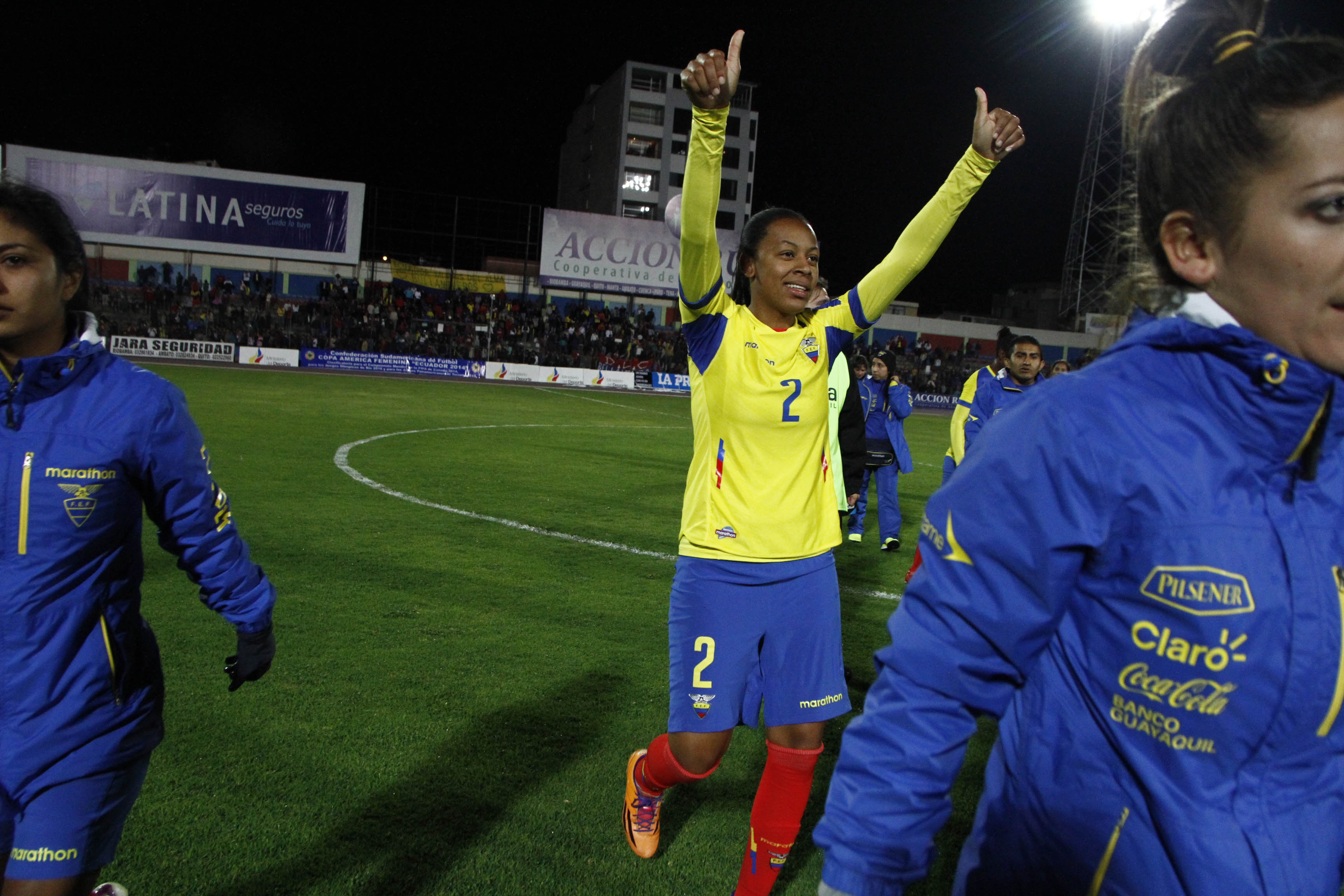
- Ortiz representing Ecuador at the 2014 Copa América Femenina

Personal information
- Full name: Katherine Solange Ortiz Simisterra
- Date of birth: 16 February 1991 (age 35)
- Place of birth: Guayaquil, Ecuador
- Height: 1.66 m (5 ft 5 1/2 in)
- Position: Defender

Team information
- Current team: Carneras UPS

Youth career
- 2007–2010: Guayas selection

Senior career*
Years	Team	Apps	(Gls)
2010–2013	Guayas selection	6	(2)
2013–2016	Rocafuerte FC		
2016-	Carneras UPS		

International career^{‡}
2008	Ecuador U17		
2014-2015	Ecuador	26	(3)
- * Club domestic league appearances and goals as of 18:23, 22 June 2015 (UTC) ‡ National team caps and goals as of 15:25, 17 June 2015 (UTC)

Katherine Solange Ortiz Simisterra (born 16 February 1991) is an Ecuadorian professional footballer who plays for Carneras UPS. She was part of the Ecuadorian squad for the 2015 FIFA Women's World Cup.

== International career ==
Ortiz represented Ecuador at the 2008 South American U-17 Women's Championship.
