= Rita Gani =

Malaysian association football referee (born 1977)

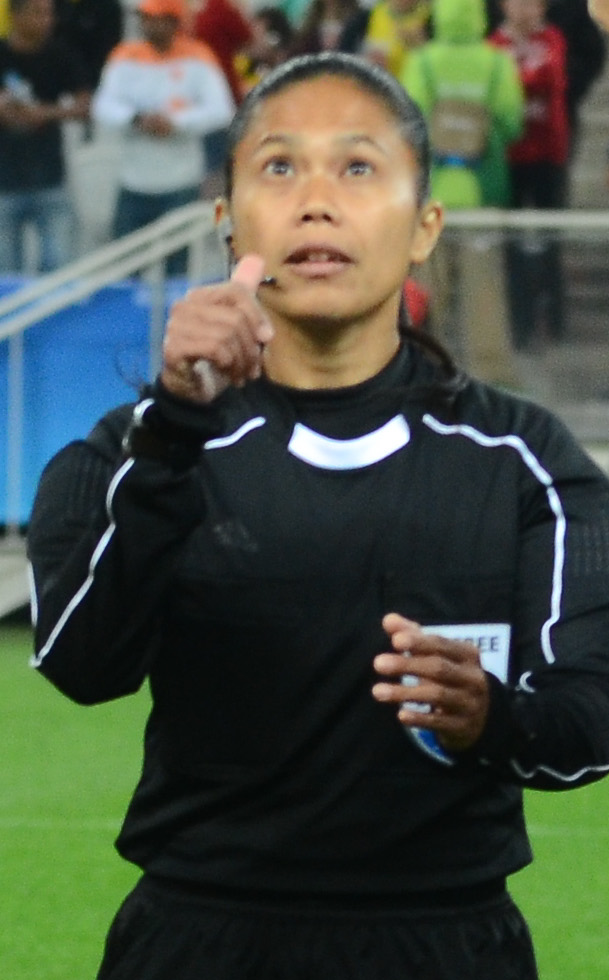
- Full name: Rita Binti Gani
- Born: 11 May 1977 (age 49); Sabah, Malaysia
- Other occupation: Police officer

International
Years	League	Role
2006–	FIFA listed	Referee

Rita Binti Gani (born 11 May 1977 in Sabah, Malaysia) is a Malaysian association football referee. A corporal in the Royal Malaysia Police force, she began officiating in 2004 and was added to the FIFA international list of referees in 2006. She was voted the AFC Woman Referee of the Year in 2014 after officiating six matches in the 2014 AFC Women's Asian Cup in Vietnam, including the semi-final between Australia and South Korea.

Gani was selected to referee in the 2015 FIFA Women's World Cup in Canada alongside fellow Malaysian Widiya Shamsuri, and took charge for the Group C match between Switzerland and Ecuador on 12 June 2015.
