= Adriana Barré =

Ecuadorian footballer (born 1995)

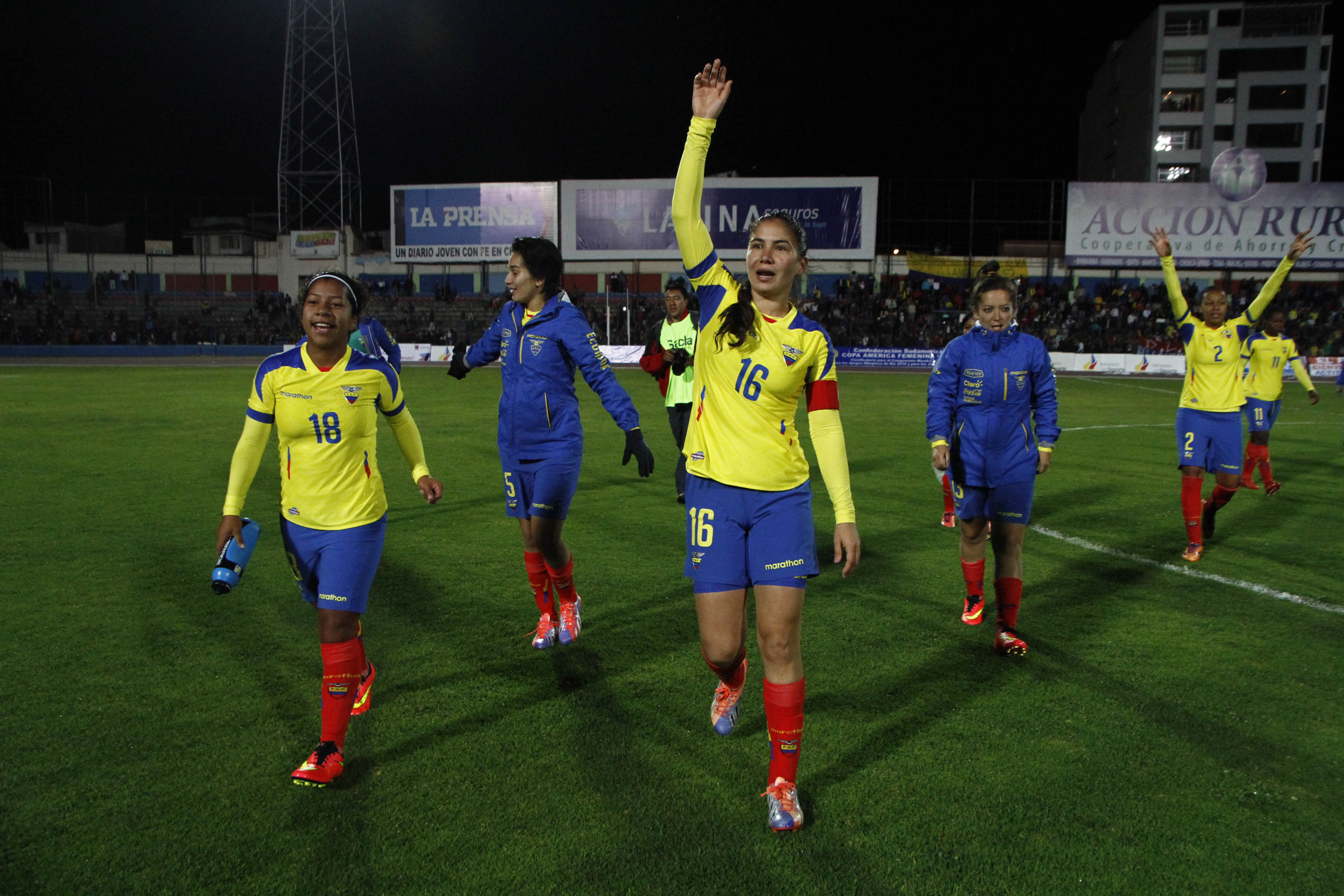
- Barré representing Ecuador at the 2014 Copa América Femenina

Personal information
- Full name: Adriana Margarita Barré Cusme
- Date of birth: 4 April 1995 (age 31)
- Place of birth: Santo Domingo, Ecuador
- Height: 1.53 m (5 ft 0 in)
- Position: Midfielder

Team information
- Current team: Galápagos SC

Senior career*
Years	Team	Apps	(Gls)
2013–2014	Quito FC		
2014–2015	Galápagos SC		
2015	Unión Española		
2015–	Galápagos SC		

International career^{‡}
2014-2015	Ecuador	24	(0)
- * Club domestic league appearances and goals as of 14:35, 22 June 2015 (UTC) ‡ National team caps and goals as of 17:29, 17 June 2015 (UTC)

Adriana Barré (born 4 April 1995) is an Ecuadorian professional footballer who plays for Galápagos SC. She was part of the Ecuadorian squad for the 2015 FIFA Women's World Cup.
