= Erika Vásquez =

Ecuadorian footballer (born 1992)

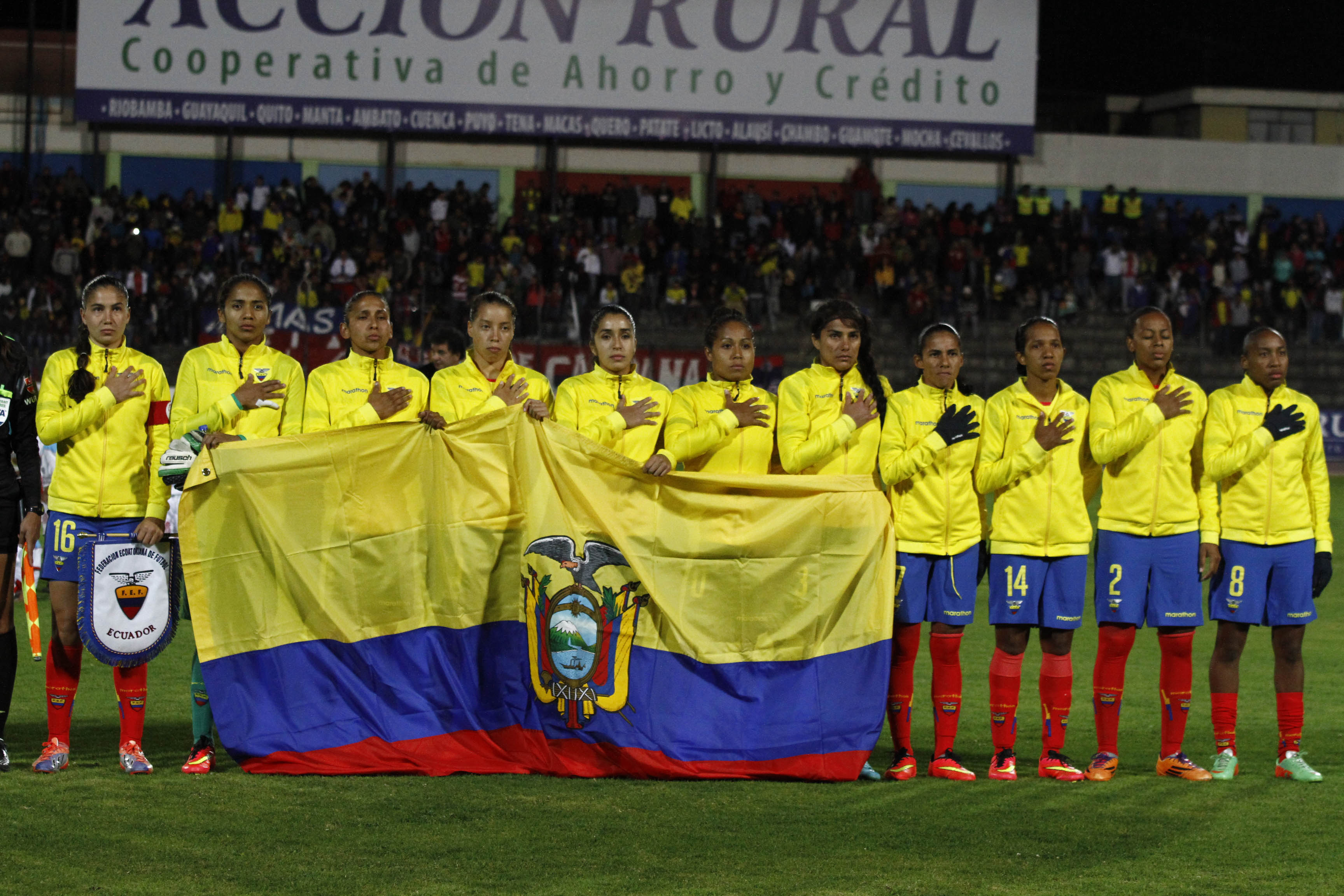
- Vásquez representing Ecuador at the 2014 Copa América Femenina

Personal information
- Full name: Erika Paola Vásquez Valencia
- Date of birth: 4 August 1992 (age 34)
- Place of birth: Rio Verde, Ecuador
- Height: 1.62 m (5 ft 4 in)
- Position: Midfielder

Team information
- Current team: Unión Española

Senior career*
Years	Team	Apps	(Gls)
2007–2010	Esmeraldas selection		
2010–2013	Guayas selection	5	(1)
2011	→ LDU Quito (loan)		
2013–2015	Rocafuerte FC		
2015–	Unión Española		

International career^{‡}
2008	Ecuador U17		
2014-2018	Ecuador	34	(3)
- * Club domestic league appearances and goals as of 19:58, 22 June 2015 (UTC) ‡ National team caps and goals as of 15:37, 17 June 2015 (UTC)

Erika Paola Vásquez Valencia (born 4 August 1992) is an Ecuadorian professional footballer who plays for Unión Española. She was part of the Ecuadorian squad for the 2015 FIFA Women's World Cup.

== International career ==
Vásquez also represented Ecuador at the 2008 South American U-17 Women's Championship.
