= Alexandra Salvador =

Canadian–Ecuadorian footballer (born 1995)

Personal information
- Full name: Alexandra Lucía Jean Salvador Duthie
- Date of birth: 11 August 1995 (age 31)
- Place of birth: Georgetown, Ontario, Canada
- Height: 1.57 m (5 ft 2 in)
- Positions: Defender; midfielder

College career
Years	Team	Apps	(Gls)
2014–2017	Alcorn State Lady Braves	51	(4)

Senior career*
Years	Team	Apps	(Gls)
2015	→ San Francisco (loan)	1	(1)

International career^{‡}
2014–2015	Ecuador	14	(0)
- * Club domestic league appearances and goals as of 16:07, 22 June 2015 (UTC) ‡ National team caps and goals as of 17:27, 17 June 2015 (UTC)

Alexandra Lucía Jean Salvador Duthie (born 11 August 1995) is a Canadian-born Ecuadorian professional footballer who plays as a defender or midfielder.

Salvador was part of the Ecuadorian squad for the 2015 FIFA Women's World Cup. She also had a brief stint in the Ecuadorian league playing for San Francisco. She was raised in Waterloo, Ontario, Canada.
