= Shirley Berruz =

Ecuadorian footballer (born 1991)

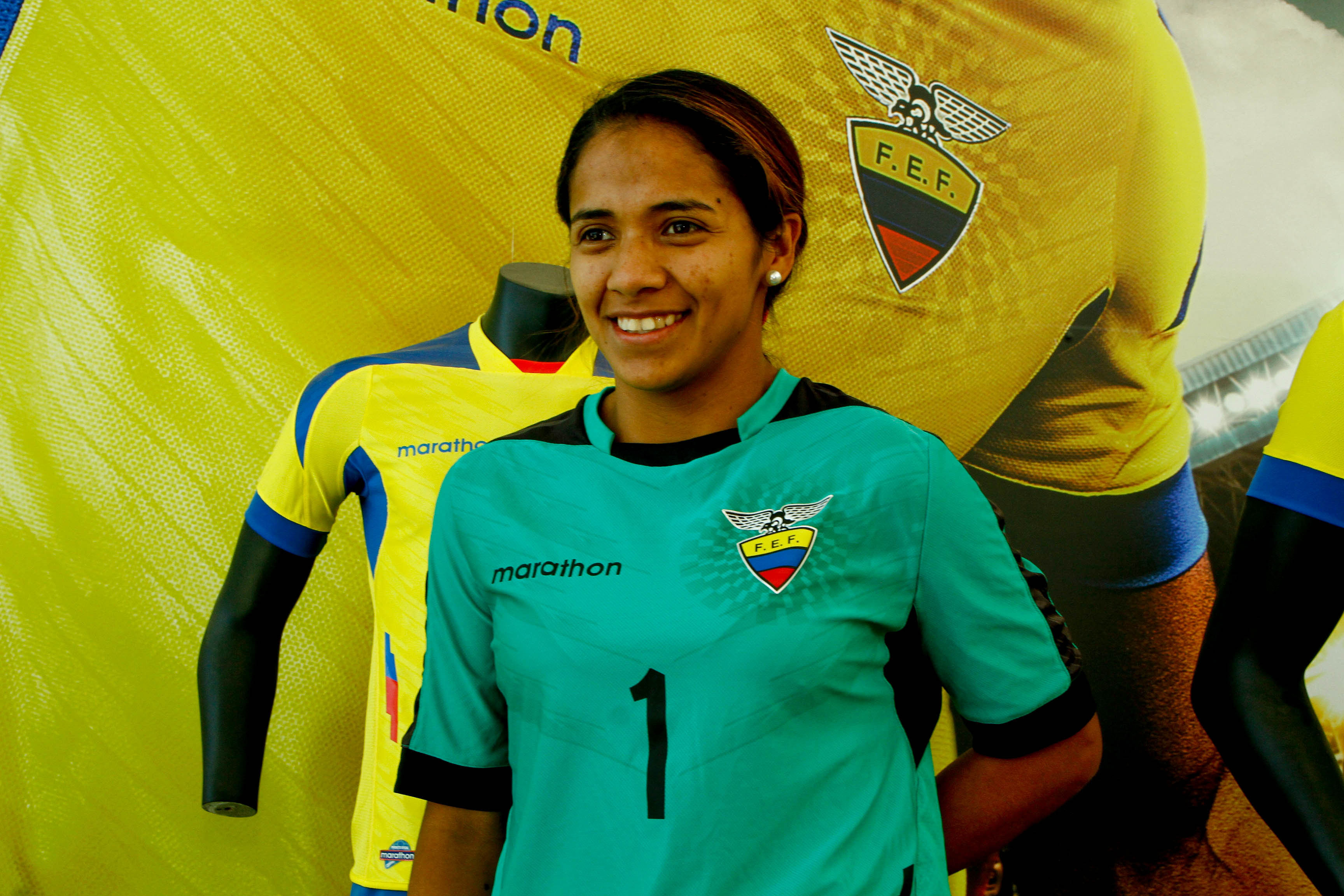

Personal information
- Full name: Shirley Viviana Berruz Aguilar
- Date of birth: 6 January 1991 (age 35)
- Place of birth: Guayaquil, Ecuador
- Height: 1.69 m (5 ft 6 1/2 in)
- Position: Goalkeeper

Team information
- Current team: CD Macara

Youth career
- 2007–2010: Guayas selection

Senior career*
Years	Team	Apps	(Gls)
2010–2013	Pichincha selection	5	(0)
2011	→ LDU Quito (loan)		
2013	Guayas selection		
2013–2014	Quito FC		
2014–2016	Rocafuerte FC		
2016–2017	Talleres Emanuel		
2017	Universidad Católica		
2017–2018	Quito FC	14	(0)
2018–2019	LD Juvenil		
2019	América de Quito	9	(0)
2020-2021	LD Juvenil		
2022-	CD Macara		

International career^{‡}
2008	Ecuador U17		
2009–2018	Ecuador	28	(0)
- * Club domestic league appearances and goals as of 12 July 2019 ‡ National team caps and goals as of 15:23, 17 June 2015 (UTC)

Shirley Viviana Berruz Aguilar (born 6 January 1991) is an Ecuadorian footballer who plays as a goalkeeper for CD Moravia.

== International career ==
Berruz represented Ecuador at the 2008 South American U-17 Women's Championship. At senior level, she played entirely the three matches Ecuador had in the 2015 FIFA Women's World Cup.
