= Angie Ponce =

Ecuadorian footballer (born 1996)

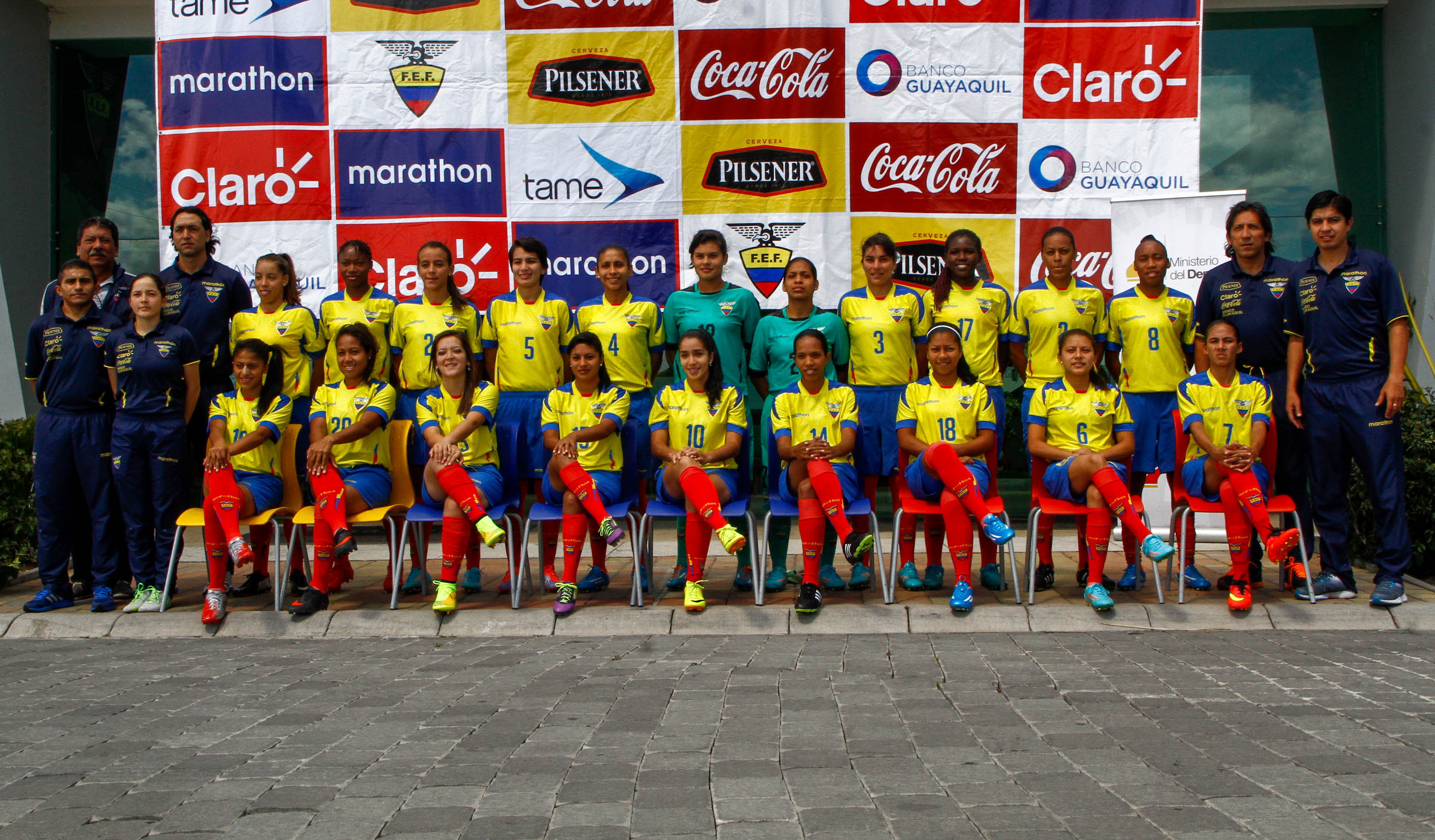

Personal information
- Full name: Angie Paola Ponce Baque
- Date of birth: 14 July 1996 (age 30)
- Place of birth: Guayaquil, Ecuador
- Height: 1.53 m (5 ft 0 in)
- Position: Defender

Team information
- Current team: Talleres Emanuel

Senior career*
Years	Team	Apps	(Gls)
2013–2014	Rocafuerte FC		
2014–2015	Talleres Emanuel		
2015	Rocafuerte FC		
2015–	Talleres Emanuel		

International career^{‡}
	Ecuador	31	(5)
- * Club domestic league appearances and goals as of 19:40, 22 June 2015 (UTC) ‡ National team caps and goals as of 15:33, 17 June 2015 (UTC)

Angie Paola Ponce Baque (born 14 July 1996) is an Ecuadorian semi-professional footballer who plays for Talleres Emanuel. She was part of the Ecuadorian squad for the 2015 FIFA Women's World Cup. Ponce holds the record for being the first, and only, player to have scored two own goals in a Women's World Cup match. In the 2015 World Cup, she scored two own goals in a single game against Switzerland in their Group C match on 12 June. However, in the same game, she scored a penalty which was the first ever Women's World Cup goal for Ecuador.
