= Ligia Moreira =

Ecuadorian footballer (born 1992)

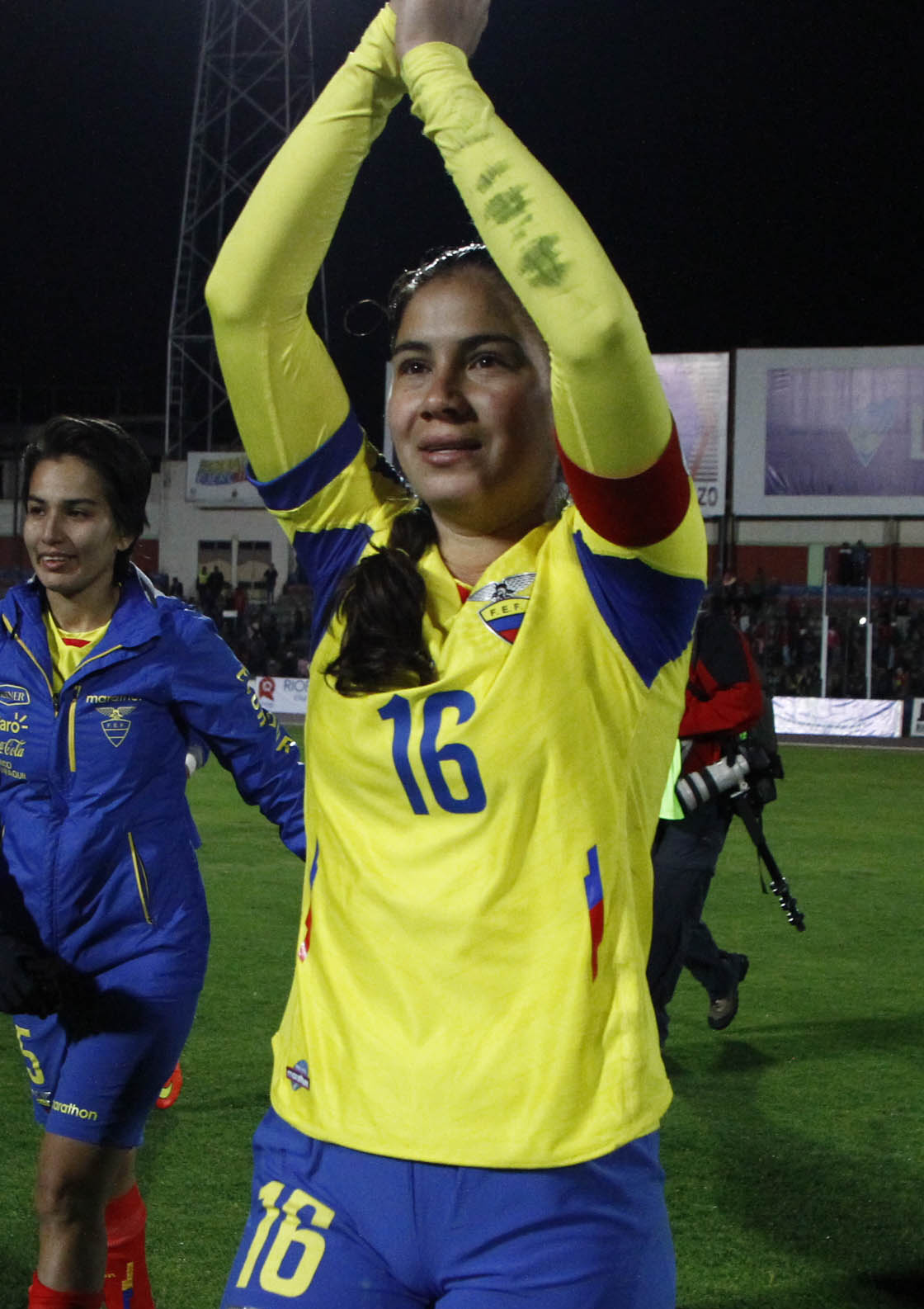

Personal information
- Full name: Ligia Elena Moreira Burgos
- Date of birth: 19 March 1992 (age 34)
- Place of birth: Buena Fe, Ecuador
- Height: 1.66 m (5 ft 5 in)
- Position: Defender

Team information
- Current team: Villarreal CF
- Number: 15

Youth career
- 2006–2010: Los Rios selection

Senior career*
Years	Team	Apps	(Gls)
2010	Pichincha selection	6	(0)
2010–2013	ESPE		
2010	→ Deportivo Quito (loan)		
2011	→ LDU Quito (loan)		
2013	Guayas selection		
2013–2015	Rocafuerte FC		
2015–2016	7 de Febrero		
2016	Atlético Santo Domingo		
2016–2018	7 de Febrero		
2018	→ Patriotas (loan)		
2018	Universidad Católica		
2018–2019	Liga Deportiva Juvenil		
2019	São José	7	(0)
2019–2020	Real Oviedo	8	(0)
2020–2021	Racing Féminas	19	(0)
2021–2023	Córdoba	50	(1)
2023–2024	Alhama	17	(1)
2024–2025	Fundación Albacete	28	(1)
2026–	Villarreal CF	32	(1)

International career^{‡}
2008	Ecuador U17		
2007–	Ecuador	46	(3)
- * Club domestic league appearances and goals as of 30 May 2026 ‡ National team caps and goals as of 16:00, 17 June 2015 (UTC)

Ligia Elena “Gigi” Moreira Burgos (born 19 March 1992) is an Ecuadorian professional footballer who plays as a defender for Villarreal CF and captains the Ecuador women's national team.

== International career ==
Moreira represented Ecuador at the 2008 South American U-17 Women's Championship.

Moreira captained Ecuador to the country's first ever FIFA Women's World Cup at the 2015 tournament edition in Canada.

At the 66th minute of Ecuador's opening match against Cameroon, with the score already 3–0 for Cameroon she was adjudged by referee Katalin Kulcsár to have fouled Cameroonian striker Gaëlle Enganamouit being the last defender and therefore was sent off after received a red card. Ecuador eventually lost the match 6–0 with Gaëlle Enganamouit scoring three goals. Moreira was suspended from Ecuador's next match against Switzerland, returning in the third match against Japan.

=== International goals ===
No.	Date	Venue	Opponent	Score	Result	Competition
1.	23 October 2021	Estadio Monumental Banco Pichincha, Guayaquil, Ecuador	Venezuela	1–0	1–4	Friendly
2.	26 October 2021	Estadio Monumental Banco Pichincha, Guayaquil, Ecuador	Venezuela	1–2	1–4	Friendly
