= Eseosa Aigbogun =

Swiss footballer (born 1993)

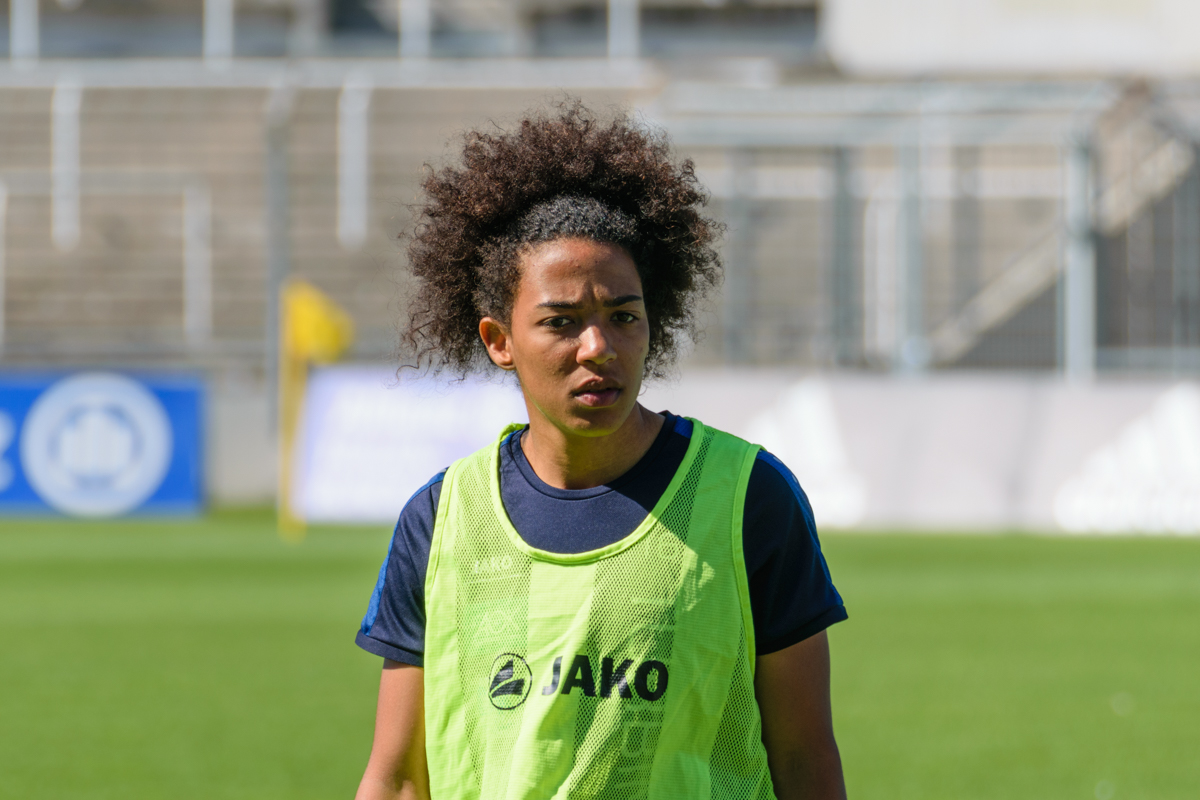

Personal information
- Full name: Eseosa Mandy Aigbogun
- Date of birth: 23 May 1993 (age 33)
- Place of birth: Zürich, Switzerland
- Height: 1.66 m (5 ft 5 in)
- Positions: Forward; full-back

Team information
- Current team: RC Strasbourg
- Number: 23

Youth career
- 2004–2009: FC Dietikon

Senior career*
Years	Team	Apps	(Gls)
2009–2011	FC Zürich		
2011–2016	FC Basel	107	(46)
2016–2018	Turbine Potsdam	29	(2)
2018–2023	Paris FC	87	(0)
2023–2025	Roma	17	(0)
2025–	RC Strasbourg	3	(0)

International career^{‡}
2013–	Switzerland	100	(3)
- * Club domestic league appearances and goals as of 15 July 2023 (UTC) ‡ National team caps and goals as of 2 December 2025 (UTC)

Eseosa Mandy Aigbogun (born 23 May 1993) is a Swiss professional footballer who plays as a forward for RC Strasbourg and for the Switzerland national team.

== Club career ==
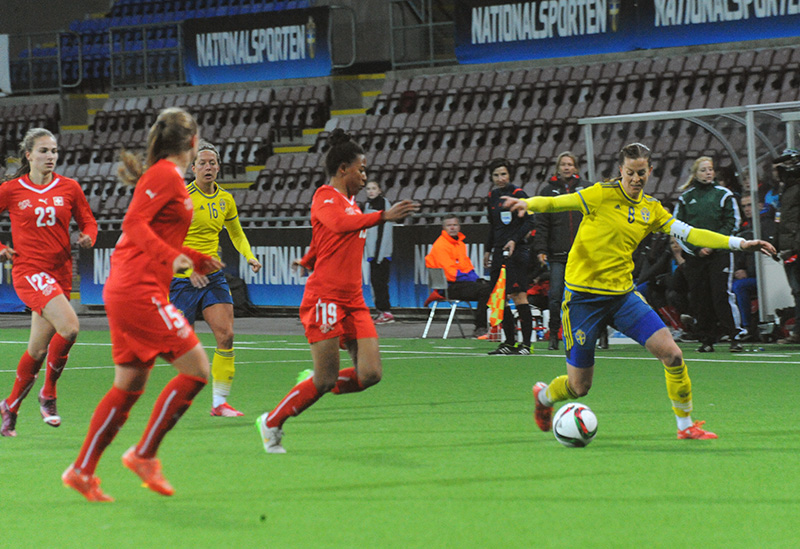
Aigbogun (19) playing against Sweden in 2015

Aigbogun started her career playing for FC Zürich and later FC Basel, both in the Swiss Nationalliga A. Since her debut in September 2013, a 9–0 win over Serbia, she has been a member of the Switzerland national team.

Aigbogun rejected a transfer offer from SC Freiburg of the Frauen-Bundesliga in 2014.

She eventually moved to Germany in 2016, signing for Turbine Potsdam.

== International career ==
She was concerned that a failure to settle abroad could cost her a place in the Swiss national squad for the 2015 FIFA Women's World Cup, where she scored one goal against Ecuador.

== Personal life ==
Aigbogun's father emigrated from Nigeria to work as a pastor in Zürich. Therefore, she was eligible to play for the Nigerian national team, before deciding to represent Switzerland.
