= Martina Moser =

Swiss footballer (born 1986)

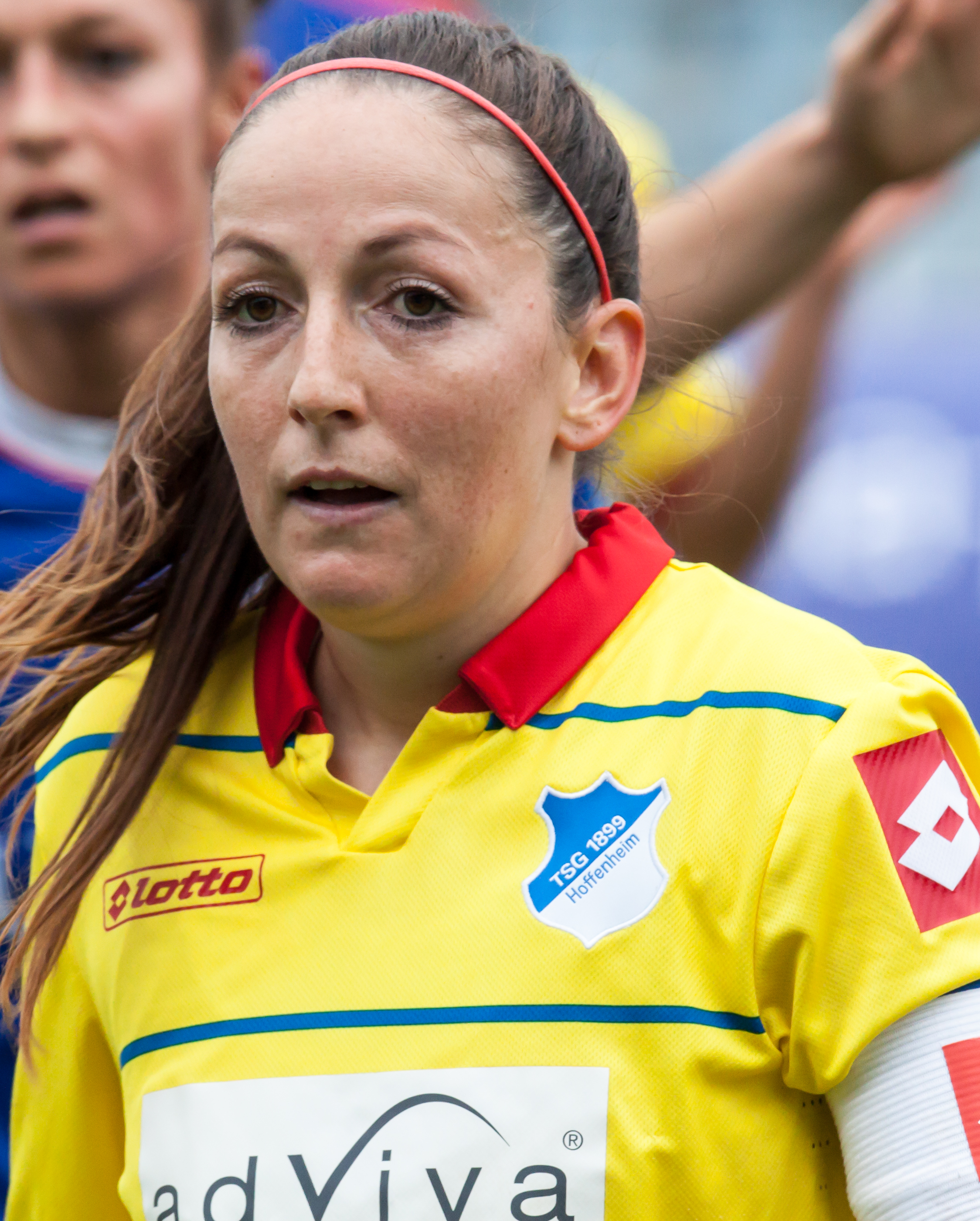

Personal information
- Date of birth: 9 April 1986 (age 40)
- Place of birth: Burgdorf, Switzerland
- Height: 1.57 m (5 ft 2 in)
- Position: Midfielder

Senior career*
Years	Team	Apps	(Gls)
2001–2005	Rot-Schwarz Thun		
2005–2007	Luzern		
2007–2010	Freiburg	63	(14)
2010–2012	Wolfsburg	39	(6)
2012–2017	TSG Hoffenheim	108	(35)
2017–2022	FC Zürich	45	(0)

International career^{‡}
2005–2017	Switzerland	126	(20)
- * Club domestic league appearances and goals as of 18:02, 21 June 2017 (UTC) ‡ National team caps and goals as of 18:02, 21 June 2017 (UTC)

Martina Moser (born 9 April 1986) is a Swiss former footballer who played as a midfielder. She is a member of the Swiss national team. In both 2018 and 2019, she helped her team win the Nationalliga A Women and Schweizer Pokal Frauen trophies. In 2021, they were runners-up for both.
