= 2015 FIFA Women's World Cup statistics =

Statistics for the 2015 FIFA Women's World Cup

The following article outlines the statistics for the 2015 FIFA Women's World Cup, which took place in Canada from 6 June to 5 July.

Goals scored from penalty shoot-outs are not counted, and matches decided by penalty shoot-outs are counted as draws.

== Goalscorers ==
There were 146 goals scored in 52 matches, for an average of 2.81 goals per match. Célia Šašić of Germany and Carli Lloyd of the United States finished as the top scorers with six goals.

6 goals

- (Germany) Célia Šašić
- (United States) Carli Lloyd

5 goals

- (Germany) Anja Mittag

3 goals

- (Australia) Kyah Simon
- (Cameroon) Gaëlle Enganamouit
- (England) Fara Williams
- (France) Marie-Laure Delie
- (France) Eugénie Le Sommer
- (Norway) Ada Hegerberg
- (Switzerland) Ramona Bachmann
- (Switzerland) Fabienne Humm

2 goals

- (Australia) Lisa De Vanna
- (Cameroon) Madeleine Ngono Mani
- (Cameroon) Gabrielle Onguéné
- (Canada) Christine Sinclair
- (China) Wang Lisi
- (China) Wang Shanshan
- (Colombia) Lady Andrade
- (England) Lucy Bronze
- (England) Karen Carney
- (Germany) Sara Däbritz
- (Germany) Lena Petermann
- (Ivory Coast) Ange N'Guessan
- (Japan) Aya Miyama
- (Japan) Yūki Ōgimi
- (Netherlands) Kirsten van de Ven
- (Norway) Solveig Gulbrandsen
- (Norway) Isabell Herlovsen
- (Sweden) Linda Sembrant
- (Thailand) Orathai Srimanee
- (United States) Megan Rapinoe

1 goal

- (Brazil) Andressa Alves
- (Brazil) Formiga
- (Brazil) Marta
- (Brazil) Raquel
- (Cameroon) Christine Manie
- (Cameroon) Ajara Nchout
- (Canada) Josée Bélanger
- (Canada) Ashley Lawrence
- (Colombia) Daniela Montoya
- (Colombia) Catalina Usme
- (Costa Rica) Melissa Herrera
- (Costa Rica) Raquel Rodríguez
- (Costa Rica) Karla Villalobos
- (Ecuador) Angie Ponce
- (England) Steph Houghton
- (England) Fran Kirby
- (England) Jodie Taylor
- (France) Amandine Henry
- (France) Louisa Nécib
- (France) Élodie Thomis
- (Germany) Melanie Behringer
- (Germany) Simone Laudehr
- (Germany) Melanie Leupolz
- (Germany) Dzsenifer Marozsán
- (Germany) Alexandra Popp
- (Ivory Coast) Josée Nahi
- (Japan) Saori Ariyoshi
- (Japan) Mana Iwabuchi
- (Japan) Mizuho Sakaguchi
- (Japan) Aya Sameshima
- (Japan) Yuika Sugasawa
- (Mexico) Fabiola Ibarra
- (Mexico) Verónica Pérez
- (Netherlands) Lieke Martens
- (New Zealand) Rebekah Stott
- (New Zealand) Hannah Wilkinson
- (Nigeria) Ngozi Okobi
- (Nigeria) Francisca Ordega
- (Nigeria) Asisat Oshoala
- (Norway) Maren Mjelde
- (Norway) Trine Rønning
- (South Korea) Cho So-hyun
- (South Korea) Jeon Ga-eul
- (South Korea) Ji So-yun
- (South Korea) Kim Soo-yun
- (Spain) Verónica Boquete
- (Spain) Vicky Losada
- (Sweden) Nilla Fischer
- (Sweden) Sofia Jakobsson
- (Switzerland) Eseosa Aigbogun
- (Switzerland) Ana-Maria Crnogorčević
- (Switzerland) Martina Moser
- (Thailand) Thanatta Chawong
- (United States) Tobin Heath
- (United States) Lauren Holiday
- (United States) Alex Morgan
- (United States) Kelley O'Hara
- (United States) Christen Press
- (United States) Abby Wambach

1 own goal

- (England) Laura Bassett (against Japan)
- (Mexico) Jenny Ruiz (against France)
- (Nigeria) Desire Oparanozie (against Sweden)
- (United States) Julie Johnston (against Japan)

2 own goals

- (Ecuador) Angie Ponce (against Switzerland)

Source: FIFA

== Assists ==
Lena Goeßling of Germany won the assists table with four assists.

4 assists

- (Germany) Lena Goeßling

3 assists

- (Norway) Solveig Gulbrandsen

2 assists

- (Australia) Lisa De Vanna
- (Cameroon) Gaëlle Enganamouit
- (Cameroon) Gabrielle Onguéné
- (Costa Rica) Katherine Alvarado
- (England) Fara Williams
- (France) Eugénie Le Sommer
- (Germany) Melanie Behringer
- (Germany) Simone Laudehr
- (Germany) Anja Mittag
- (Germany) Lena Petermann
- (Japan) Aya Miyama
- (Netherlands) Manon Melis
- (Nigeria) Ngozi Okobi
- (South Korea) Kang Yu-mi
- (Switzerland) Ramona Bachmann
- (Thailand) Anootsara Maijarern

1 assist

- (Australia) Laura Alleway
- (Australia) Michelle Heyman
- (Australia) Sam Kerr
- (Brazil) Andressinha
- (Cameroon) Raissa Feudjio
- (Cameroon) Claudine Meffometou
- (Canada) Christine Sinclair
- (China) Li Dongna
- (China) Tan Ruyin
- (China) Wu Haiyan
- (Colombia) Tatiana Ariza
- (Colombia) Diana Ospina
- (Colombia) Yoreli Rincón
- (Colombia) Leicy Santos
- (Costa Rica) Lixy Rodríguez
- (England) Alex Greenwood
- (England) Steph Houghton
- (England) Jodie Taylor
- (France) Laure Boulleau
- (France) Marie-Laure Delie
- (France) Amel Majri
- (France) Gaëtane Thiney
- (France) Élodie Thomis
- (Germany) Leonie Maier
- (Germany) Dzsenifer Marozsán
- (Germany) Célia Šašić
- (Germany) Bianca Schmidt
- (Ivory Coast) Christine Lohoues
- (Japan) Azusa Iwashimizu
- (Japan) Nahomi Kawasumi
- (Japan) Yuika Sugasawa
- (Mexico) Charlyn Corral
- (Mexico) Alina Garciamendez
- (Netherlands) Vivianne Miedema
- (New Zealand) Amber Hearn
- (New Zealand) Ria Percival
- (Nigeria) Desire Oparanozie
- (Norway) Emilie Haavi
- (Norway) Lene Mykjåland
- (Norway) Maria Thorisdottir
- (Norway) Elise Thorsnes
- (South Korea) Jeon Ga-eul
- (Spain) Sonia Bermúdez
- (Spain) Marta Corredera
- (Sweden) Lisa Dahlkvist
- (Sweden) Lina Nilsson
- (Sweden) Therese Sjögran
- (Switzerland) Eseosa Aigbogun
- (Switzerland) Ana-Maria Crnogorčević
- (Switzerland) Nicole Remund
- (Switzerland) Lia Wälti
- (Thailand) Rattikan Thongsombut
- (United States) Julie Johnston
- (United States) Ali Krieger
- (United States) Sydney Leroux
- (United States) Carli Lloyd
- (United States) Megan Rapinoe

Source: FIFA Technical Report

== Scoring ==
=== Overall ===
Overall

- Total number of goals scored: 146
- Average goals per match: 2.81
- Total number of braces: 9
  Marie-Laure Delie, Ada Hegerberg, Isabell Herlovsen, Eugénie Le Sommer, Lena Petermann, Megan Rapinoe, Célia Šašić, Kyah Simon, Orathai Srimanee
- Total number of hat-tricks: 6
  Ramona Bachmann, Gaëlle Enganamouit, Fabienne Humm, Carli Lloyd, Anja Mittag, Célia Šašić,
- Total number of penalty kicks awarded: 22
- Total number of penalty kicks scored: 18
  Ramona Bachmann, Gaëlle Enganamouit, Carli Lloyd (2), Ji So-yun, Christine Manie, Marta, Aya Miyama (2), Gabrielle Onguéné, Angie Ponce, Célia Šašić (2), Christine Sinclair, Wang Lisi, Fara Williams (3)
- Total number of penalty kicks missed or saved: 4
  Amber Hearn, Maren Mjelde, Célia Šašić, Abby Wambach
- Penalty kick success rate: 81.82%
- Own goals scored: 6
  Laura Bassett, Julie Johnston, Desire Oparanozie, Angie Ponce (2), Jennifer Ruiz

Timing

- First goal of the tournament: Christine Sinclair (penalty) for Canada against China
- First brace of the tournament: Isabell Herlovsen for Norway against Thailand
- First hat-trick of the tournament: Célia Šašić for Germany against Ivory Coast
- Latest goal in a match: 108 minutes
  Fara Williams (penalty) for England against Germany

Teams

- Most goals scored by a team: 20
  Germany
- Fewest goals scored by a team: 1
  Ecuador
- Best goal difference: +14
  Germany
- Worst goal difference: -16
  Ecuador
- Most goals scored in a match by both teams: 11
  Switzerland 10–1 Ecuador
- Most goals scored in a match by one team: 10
  Germany against Ivory Coast, Switzerland against Ecuador
- Most goals scored in a match by the losing team: 2
  Ivory Coast against Thailand, Japan against United States
- Biggest margin of victory: 10 goals
  Germany 10–0 Ivory Coast
- Most clean sheets achieved by a team: 5
  United States
- Fewest clean sheets achieved by a team: 0
  Costa Rica, Ivory Coast, Mexico, Nigeria, South Korea, Spain, Switzerland, Thailand
- Most clean sheets given by an opposing team: 2
  China, Ecuador, Germany, New Zealand, Nigeria, South Korea, Switzerland, Thailand
- Fewest clean sheets given by an opposing team: 0
  Japan, Norway
- Most consecutive clean sheets achieved by a team: 5
  United States
- Most consecutive clean sheets given by an opposing team: 2
  Germany, New Zealand, Nigeria

Individual

- Most goals scored by an individual: 6
  Carli Lloyd, Célia Šašić
- Most assists provided by an individual: 3
  Lena Goeßling
- Most goals and assists produced by an individual: 7
  Carli Lloyd (6 goals, 1 assist), Anja Mittag (5 goals, 2 assists), Célia Šašić (6 goals, 1 assist),
- Most clean sheets achieved by a goalkeeper: 5
  Hope Solo
- Fewest clean sheets achieved by a goalkeeper: 0
  Melissa Barbieri, Shirley Berruz, Waraporn Boonsing, Stefany Castaño, Precious Dede, Dinnia Díaz, Cynthia Djohore, Kim Jung-mi, Cecilia Santiago, Gaëlle Thalmann, Dominique Thiamale, Ainhoa Tirapu, Sari van Veenendaal
- Most consecutive clean sheets achieved by a goalkeeper: 5
  Hope Solo
- Most goals scored by one player in a match: 3
  Ramona Bachmann for Switzerland against Ecuador, Gaëlle Enganamouit for Cameroon against Ecuador, Fabienne Humm for Switzerland against Ecuador, Carli Lloyd for United States against Japan, Anja Mittag for Germany against Ivory Coast, Célia Šašić for Germany against Ivory Coast
- Oldest goal scorer: 37 years, 3 months and 6 days
  Formiga for Brazil against South Korea
- Youngest goal scorer: 18 years, 8 months and 3 days
  Melissa Herrera for Costa Rica against South Korea

== Wins and losses ==
- Most wins: 6 – Japan, United States
- Fewest wins: 0 – Costa Rica, Ecuador, Ivory Coast, Mexico, New Zealand, Nigeria, Spain, Sweden
- Most losses: 3 – Ecuador, Ivory Coast, Switzerland
- Fewest losses: 0 – United States
- Most draws: 3 – Sweden
- Fewest draws: 0 – Brazil, Cameroon, Ecuador, England, Ivory Coast, Japan, Switzerland, Thailand
- Most points in the group stage: 9 – Brazil, Japan
- Fewest points in the group stage: 0 – Ecuador, Ivory Coast

== Match awards ==
=== Player of the Match ===
Rank	Name	Team	Opponent	Awards
1	Carli Lloyd	United States	Colombia (R16), China PR (QF), Germany (SF), Japan (WCF)	4
2	Aya Miyama	Japan	Switzerland (GS), Cameroon (GS), Ecuador (GS)	3
3	Karen Bardsley	England	Norway (R16), Germany (TP)	2
3	Amandine Henry	France	Mexico (GS), South Korea (R16)	2
3	Elise Kellond-Knight	Australia	Sweden (GS), Brazil (R16)	2
3	Anja Mittag	Germany	Ivory Coast (GS), Sweden (R16)	2

=== Clean sheets ===
Rank	Name	Team	Opponent	Awards
1	Hope Solo	United States	Sweden (GS), Nigeria (GS), Colombia (R16), China PR (QF), Germany (SF)	5
2	Sarah Bouhaddi	France	England (GS), Mexico (GS), South Korea (R16)	3
2	Luciana	Brazil	South Korea (GS), Spain (GS), Costa Rica (GS)	3
2	Erin McLeod	Canada	China PR (GS), New Zealand (GS), Switzerland (R16)	3
5	Nadine Angerer	Germany	Ivory Coast (GS), Thailand (GS)	2
5	Wang Fei	China	Netherlands (GS), Cameroon (R16)	2
5	Lydia Williams	Australia	Nigeria (GS), Brazil (R16)	2

== Discipline ==
- Total number of yellow cards: 110
- Average number of yellow cards per match: 2.12
- Total number of red cards: 3
- Average number of red cards per match: 0.06
- First yellow card of the tournament: Desiree Scott – Canada against China PR
- First red card of the tournament: Ligia Moreira – Ecuador against Cameroon
- Fastest dismissal from kick off: 47 minutes – Catalina Pérez – Colombia against United States
- Latest dismissal in a match: 69 minutes – Sarah Nnodim – Nigeria against United States
- Least time difference between two yellow cards given to the same player: 31 minutes – Sarah Nnodim – Nigeria against United States
- Most yellow cards (team): 9 – Colombia
- Most red cards (team): 1 – Colombia, Ecuador, Nigeria
- Fewest yellow cards (team): 0 – Australia, Costa Rica
- Most yellow cards (player): 2 – Hwang Bo-Ram, Fatou Coulibaly, Sarah Nnodim, Josephine Chukwunonye,
- Most red cards (player): 1 – Ligia Moreira, Sarah Nnodim, Catalina Pérez
- Most red cards (match): 1 – Cameroon vs Ecuador, Nigeria vs United States, United States vs Colombia

== Multiple World Cups ==
Scoring at three or more World Cups

Name	(United States) 2003		(China) 2007		(Germany) 2011		(Canada) 2015		Total goals
Name	Goals	Against	Goals	Against	Goals	Against	Goals	Against	Total goals
(Australia) Lisa De Vanna	—N/a		4	GHA (2), NOR, BRA	1	EQG	2	USA, SWE	7
(Germany) Simone Laudehr	—N/a		1	BRA	1	NGA	1	CIV	3
(Brazil) Marta	3	KOR, NOR, SWE	7	NZL (2), CHN (2), AUS, USA (2)	4	NOR (2), USA (2)	1	KOR	15
(Japan) Aya Miyama	0	—N/a	2	ENG (2)	2	NZL, USA	2	SUI, ENG	6
(Japan) Yūki Ōgimi	—N/a		1	ARG	1	NZL	2	ECU, USA	4
(Canada) Christine Sinclair	3	GER, JPN, USA	3	GHA (2), AUS	1	GER	2	CHN, ENG	9
(United States) Abby Wambach	3	NGA, PRK, NOR	6	PRK, SWE (2), ENG, NOR (2)	4	SWE, BRA, FRA, JPN	1	NGA	14
(England) Fara Williams	—N/a		1	ARG	1	MEX	3	COL, JPN, GER	5

Appearing in four or more World Cups

Name	(Sweden) 1995		(United States) 1999		(United States) 2003		(China) 2007		(Germany) 2011		(Canada) 2015		Total
Name	Apps	Against	Apps	Against	Apps	Against	Apps	Against	Apps	Against	Apps	Against	Total
(Japan) Kozue Ando	—N/a		1	NOR	—N/a		2	ENG, ARG	6	NZL, MEX, ENG, GER, SWE, USA	1	SUI	10
(Australia) Melissa Barbieri	—N/a		—N/a		1	GHA	4	GHA, NOR, CAN, BRA	3	BRA, NOR, SWE	1	USA	9
(United States) Shannon Boxx	—N/a		—N/a		6	SWE, NGA, PRK, NOR, GER, CAN	5	PRK, SWE, NGA, ENG, BRA	5	PRK, SWE, BRA, FRA, JPN	1	NGA	17
(Brazil) Cristiane	—N/a		—N/a		4	KOR, NOR, FRA, SWE	6	NZL, CHN, DEN, AUS, USA, GER	4	AUS, NOR, EQG, USA	3	KOR, ESP, AUS	17
(Nigeria) Onome Ebi	—N/a		—N/a		3	PRK, USA, SWE	2	SWE, PRK	3	FRA, GER, CAN	3	SWE, AUS, USA	11
(Brazil) Formiga	2	JPN, GER	6	MEX, ITA, GER, NGA, USA, NOR	3	KOR, NOR, SWE	6	NZL, CHN, DEN, AUS, USA, GER	4	AUS, NOR, EQG, USA	3	KOR, ESP, AUS	24
(Norway) Solveig Gulbrandsen	—N/a		5	CAN, JPN, SWE, CHN, BRA	4	FRA, BRA, KOR, USA	6	CAN, AUS, GHA, CHN, GER, USA	—N/a		4	THA, GER, IVC, ENG	19
(Brazil) Marta	—N/a		—N/a		4	KOR, NOR, FRA, SWE	6	NZL, CHN, DEN, AUS, USA, GER	4	AUS, NOR, EQG, USA	3	KOR, ESP, AUS	17
(Japan) Aya Miyama	—N/a		—N/a		1	CAN	3	ENG, ARG, GER	6	NZL, MEX, ENG, GER, SWE, USA	7	SUI, CMR, ECU, NED, AUS, ENG, USA	17
(Nigeria) Perpetua Nkwocha	—N/a		—N/a		3	PRK, USA, SWE	3	SWE, PRK, USA	3	FRA, GER, CAN	1	AUS	10
(United States) Christie Rampone	—N/a		1	PRK	4	SWE, PRK, NOR, CAN	6	PRK, SWE, NGA, ENG, BRA, NOR	6	PRK, COL, SWE, BRA, FRA, JPN	2	NGA, JPN	19
(Norway) Trine Rønning	—N/a		—N/a		4	FRA, BRA, KOR, USA	4	CAN, AUS, CHN, GER	3	EQG, BRA, AUS	2	THA, ENG	13
(Japan) Homare Sawa	3	SWE, BRA, GER	3	CAN, RUS, NOR	3	ARG, GER, CAN	3	ENG, ARG, GER	6	NZL, MEX, ENG, GER, SWE, USA	6	SUI, CMR, ECU, NED, AUS, USA	24
(Canada) Christine Sinclair	—N/a		—N/a		6	GER, ARG, JPN, CHN, SWE, USA	3	NOR, GHA, AUS	3	GER, FRA, NGA	5	CHN, NZL, NED, SUI, ENG	17
(Sweden) Therese Sjögran	—N/a		—N/a		5	USA, NGA, BRA, CAN, GER	3	NGA, USA, PRK	6	COL, PRK, USA, AUS, JPN, FRA	4	NGA, USA, AUS, GER	18
(United States) Abby Wambach	—N/a		—N/a		6	SWE, NGA, PRK, NOR, GER, CAN	6	PRK, SWE, NGA, ENG, BRA, NOR	6	PRK, COL, SWE, BRA, FRA, JPN	7	AUS, SWE, NGA, COL, CHN, GER, JPN	25
(Canada) Rhian Wilkinson	—N/a		—N/a		6	GER, ARG, JPN, CHN, SWE, USA	3	NOR, GHA, AUS	3	GER, FRA, NGA	3	NED, SUI, ENG	15

== Overall results ==
Bold numbers indicate the maximum values in each column.

=== By team ===
Team	Pld	W	D	L	Pts	APts	GF	AGF	GA	AGA	GD	AGD	CS	ACS	YC	AYC	RC	ARC
Australia	5	2	1	2	7	1.40	5	1.00	5	1.00	0	0.00	2	0.40	0	0.00	0	0.00
Brazil	4	3	0	1	9	2.25	4	1.00	1	0.25	+3	0.75	3	**0.75**	3	0.75	0	0.00
Canada	5	2	2	1	8	1.60	4	0.80	3	0.60	+1	0.20	3	0.60	6	1.20	0	0.00
China	5	2	1	2	7	1.40	4	0.80	4	0.80	0	0.00	2	0.40	3	0.60	0	0.00
Cameroon	4	2	0	2	6	1.50	9	2.25	4	1.00	+5	1.25	1	0.25	7	1.75	0	0.00
Colombia	4	1	1	2	4	1.00	4	1.00	5	1.25	−1	−0.25	1	0.25	**9**	2.25	**1**	0.25
Costa Rica	3	0	2	1	2	0.67	3	1.00	4	1.33	−1	−0.33	0	0.00	0	0.00	0	0.00
Ecuador	3	0	0	**3**	0	0.00	1	0.33	**17**	**5.67**	−16	−5.33	0	0.00	6	2.00	**1**	**0.33**
England	**7**	5	0	2	15	2.14	10	1.43	7	1.00	+3	0.43	1	0.14	8	1.14	0	0.00
France	5	3	1	1	10	2.00	10	2.00	3	0.60	+7	1.40	3	0.60	3	0.60	0	0.00
Germany	**7**	3	2	2	11	1.57	**20**	**2.86**	6	0.86	**+14**	**2.00**	2	0.29	8	1.14	0	0.00
Ivory Coast	3	0	0	**3**	0	0.00	3	1.00	16	5.33	−13	−4.33	0	0.00	8	**2.67**	0	0.00
Japan	**7**	**6**	0	1	18	2.57	11	1.57	8	1.14	+3	0.43	3	0.43	6	0.86	0	0.00
Mexico	3	0	1	2	1	0.33	2	0.67	8	2.67	−6	−2.00	0	0.00	4	1.33	0	0.00
Netherlands	4	1	1	2	4	1.00	3	0.75	4	1.00	−1	−0.25	1	0.25	3	0.75	0	0.00
New Zealand	3	0	2	1	2	0.67	2	0.67	3	1.00	−1	−0.33	1	0.33	4	1.33	0	0.00
Nigeria	3	0	1	2	1	0.33	3	1.00	6	2.00	−3	−1.00	0	0.00	5	1.67	**1**	**0.33**
Norway	4	2	1	1	7	1.75	9	2.25	4	1.00	+5	1.25	1	0.25	1	0.25	0	0.00
South Korea	4	1	1	2	4	1.00	4	1.00	8	2.00	−4	−1.00	0	0.00	7	1.75	0	0.00
Spain	3	0	1	2	1	0.33	2	0.67	4	1.33	−2	−0.67	0	0.00	3	1.00	0	0.00
Sweden	4	0	**3**	1	3	0.75	5	1.25	8	2.00	−3	−0.75	1	0.25	2	0.50	0	0.00
Switzerland	4	1	0	**3**	3	0.75	11	2.75	5	1.25	+6	1.50	0	0.00	5	1.25	0	0.00
Thailand	3	1	0	2	3	1.00	3	1.00	10	3.33	−7	−2.33	0	0.00	3	1.00	0	0.00
**United States**	**7**	**6**	1	0	**19**	**2.71**	14	2.00	3	0.43	+11	1.57	**5**	0.71	6	0.86	0	0.00
Total	52^{(1)}	41	11^{(2)}	41	145	1.39	146	1.40	146	1.40	0	0.00	25	0.24	110	1.06	3	0.03

Team(s) rendered in italics represent(s) the host nation(s). The competition's winning team is rendered in bold.
^{(1)} – Total games lost not counted in total games played (total games lost = total games won)
^{(2)} – Total number of games drawn (tied) for all teams = Total number of games drawn (tied) ÷ 2 (both teams involved)
^{(3)} – As per statistical convention in football, matches decided in extra time are counted as wins and losses, while matches decided by penalty shoot-outs are counted as draws.

=== By confederation ===
Confederation	T	Pld	W	D	L	Pts	APts	Pts/T
AFC	5	24	12	3	9	39	1.63	**7.80**
CAF	3	10	2	1	7	7	0.70	2.33
CONCACAF	4	18	8	6	4	30	**1.67**	7.50
CONMEBOL	3	11	4	1	6	13	1.18	4.33
OFC	1	3	0	2	1	2	0.67	2.00
UEFA	**8**	**38**	**15**	**9**	**14**	**54**	1.42	6.75
Total	24	52^{(1)}	41	11^{(2)}	41	145	1.39	6.04

Host nation(s) are situated in the region(s) rendered in italics.
^{(1)} – Total games lost not counted in total games played (total games lost = total games won)
^{(2)} – Total number of games drawn (tied) for all teams = Total number of games drawn (tied) ÷ 2 (both teams involved)
^{(3)} – As per statistical convention in football, matches decided in extra time are counted as wins and losses, while matches decided by penalty shoot-outs are counted as draws.
