= 2015 FIFA Women's World Cup Group B =

Football tournament group stage

Group B of the 2015 FIFA Women's World Cup consisted of Germany, Ivory Coast, Norway and Thailand. Matches were played from 7 to 15 June 2015. Thailand became the first Southeast Asian country to play at a senior World Cup (male or female) since Indonesia (played as the Dutch East Indies) in the 1938 FIFA World Cup.

== Teams ==
| Draw position | Team | Confederation | Method of qualification | Date of qualification | Finals appearance | Last appearance | Previous best performance | FIFA Rankings at start of event |
|---|---|---|---|---|---|---|---|---|
| B1 (seed) | Germany | UEFA | UEFA Group 1 winners | 13 September 2014 | 7th | 2011 | Winners (2003, 2007) | 1 |
| B2 | Ivory Coast | CAF | African Women's Championship 3rd place | 25 October 2014 | 1st | — | — | 67 |
| B3 | Norway | UEFA | UEFA Group 5 winners | 13 September 2014 | 7th | 2011 | Winners (1995) | 11 |
| B4 | Thailand | AFC | AFC Women's Asian Cup playoff Winner | 21 May 2014 | 1st | — | — | 29 |

== Standings ==
| Pos | Team | Pld | W | D | L | GF | GA | GD | Pts | Qualification |
|---|---|---|---|---|---|---|---|---|---|---|
| 1 | Germany | 3 | 2 | 1 | 0 | 15 | 1 | +14 | 7 | Advance to knockout stage |
| 2 | Norway | 3 | 2 | 1 | 0 | 8 | 2 | +6 | 7 | Advance to knockout stage |
| 3 | Thailand | 3 | 1 | 0 | 2 | 3 | 10 | −7 | 3 | |
| 4 | Ivory Coast | 3 | 0 | 0 | 3 | 3 | 16 | −13 | 0 | |

Source: FIFA
Rules for classification: Group stage tiebreakers

In the round of 16:

- Germany advanced to play Sweden (third-placed team of Group D).
- Norway advanced to play England (runner-up of Group F).

== Matches ==
=== Norway vs Thailand ===
7 June 2015
13:00 EDT (UTC−4)

| Norway | 4–0 | Thailand |
|---|---|---|
| Rønning 15'; Herlovsen 29', 34'; Hegerberg 68' | Report |

TD Place Stadium, Ottawa
Attendance: 20,953
Referee: Anna-Marie Keighley (New Zealand)

| Norway | Thailand |

| GK | 1 | Ingrid Hjelmseth |
| RB | 6 | Maren Mjelde |
| CB | 7 | Trine Rønning (c) | (substituted off) 63' |
| CB | 11 | Nora Holstad Berge | (substituted off) 46' |
| LB | 13 | Ingrid Moe Wold |
| RM | 8 | Solveig Gulbrandsen | (substituted off) 69' |
| CM | 4 | Gry Tofte Ims |
| LM | 17 | Lene Mykjåland |
| RF | 19 | Kristine Minde |
| CF | 9 | Isabell Herlovsen |
| LF | 21 | Ada Hegerberg |
Substitutions:
| DF | 3 | Marita Skammelsrud Lund | (substituted on) 46' |
| FW | 16 | Elise Thorsnes | (substituted on) 63' |
| FW | 20 | Emilie Haavi | (substituted on) 69' |
Manager:
Even Pellerud

| GK | 1 | Waraporn Boonsing |
| RB | 9 | Warunee Phetwiset | (yellow card) 51' |
| CB | 4 | Duangnapa Sritala (c) | (yellow card) 75' |
| CB | 3 | Natthakarn Chinwong |
| LB | 10 | Sunisa Srangthaisong |
| CM | 6 | Pikul Khueanpet |
| CM | 7 | Silawan Intamee |
| RW | 12 | Rattikan Thongsombut |
| AM | 8 | Naphat Seesraum | | (substituted off) 59' |
| LW | 17 | Anootsara Maijarern | | (substituted off) 90' |
| CF | 21 | Kanjana Sungngoen |
Substitutions:
| FW | 13 | Orathai Srimanee | | (substituted on) 59' |
| FW | 14 | Thanatta Chawong | | (substituted on) 90' |
Manager:
Nuengruethai Sathongwien

Player of the Match:
Isabell Herlovsen (Norway)

Assistant referees:
Sarah Walker (New Zealand)
Lata Kaumatule (Tonga)
Fourth official:
Ledya Tafesse (Ethiopia)
Fifth official:
Petruța Iugulescu (Romania)

=== Germany vs Ivory Coast ===
7 June 2015
16:00 EDT (UTC−4)

| Germany | 10–0 | Ivory Coast |
|---|---|---|
| Šašić 3', 14', 31'; Mittag 29', 35', 64'; Laudehr 71'; Däbritz 75'; Behringer 79'; Popp 85' | Report |

TD Place Stadium, Ottawa
Attendance: 20,953
Referee: Carol Anne Chenard (Canada)

| Germany | Ivory Coast |

| GK | 1 | Nadine Angerer (c) |
| RB | 4 | Leonie Maier |
| CB | 5 | Annike Krahn |
| CB | 3 | Saskia Bartusiak |
| LB | 22 | Tabea Kemme |
| CM | 20 | Lena Goeßling |
| CM | 16 | Melanie Leupolz | (substituted off) 17' |
| RW | 6 | Simone Laudehr | (substituted off) 73' |
| LW | 18 | Alexandra Popp |
| CF | 13 | Célia Šašić | (substituted off) 46' |
| CF | 11 | Anja Mittag |
Substitutions:
| MF | 7 | Melanie Behringer | (substituted on) 17' |
| MF | 23 | Sara Däbritz | (substituted on) 46' |
| FW | 19 | Lena Petermann | (substituted on) 73' |
Manager:
Silvia Neid

| GK | 16 | Dominique Thiamale (c) | (yellow card) 40' |
| RB | 22 | Raymonde Kacou |
| CB | 21 | Sophie Aguie | (yellow card) 58' |
| CB | 2 | Fatou Coulibaly | (yellow card) 70' |
| LB | 4 | Nina Kpaho | | (substituted off) 38' |
| CM | 6 | Rita Akaffou | (yellow card) 36' |
| CM | 12 | Ida Guehai |
| RW | 14 | Josée Nahi | (yellow card) 86' |
| AM | 7 | Nadege Essoh | | (substituted off) 51' |
| LW | 11 | Rebecca Elloh | (yellow card) 66' | (substituted off) 72' |
| CF | 18 | Binta Diakité |
Substitutions:
| DF | 13 | Fernande Tchetche | | (substituted on) 38' |
| FW | 8 | Ines Nrehy | | (substituted on) 51' |
| FW | 10 | Ange N'Guessan | | (substituted on) 72' |
Manager:
Clémentine Touré

Player of the Match:
Anja Mittag (Germany)

Assistant referees:
Marie-Josée Charbonneau (Canada)
Suzanne Morisset (Canada)
Fourth official:
Michelle Pye (Canada)
Fifth official:
Petruța Iugulescu (Romania)

=== Germany vs Norway ===
11 June 2015
16:00 EDT (UTC−4)

| Germany | 1–1 | Norway |
|---|---|---|
| Mittag 6' | Report | Mjelde 61' |

TD Place Stadium, Ottawa
Attendance: 18,987
Referee: Teodora Albon (Romania)

| Germany | Norway |

| GK | 1 | Nadine Angerer (c) |
| RB | 4 | Leonie Maier |
| CB | 5 | Annike Krahn |
| CB | 3 | Saskia Bartusiak | (yellow card) 59' |
| LB | 22 | Tabea Kemme |
| CM | 20 | Lena Goeßling |
| CM | 10 | Dzsenifer Marozsán |
| RW | 6 | Simone Laudehr | | (substituted off) 66' |
| AM | 11 | Anja Mittag | | (substituted off) 80' |
| LW | 18 | Alexandra Popp | | (substituted off) 70' |
| CF | 13 | Célia Šašić |
Substitutions:
| MF | 9 | Lena Lotzen | | (substituted on) 66' |
| MF | 23 | Sara Däbritz | | (substituted on) 70' |
| FW | 8 | Pauline Bremer | | (substituted on) 80' |
Manager:
Silvia Neid

| GK | 1 | Ingrid Hjelmseth (c) |
| RB | 6 | Maren Mjelde |
| CB | 3 | Marita Skammelsrud Lund |
| CB | 2 | Maria Thorisdottir |
| LB | 13 | Ingrid Moe Wold |
| CM | 14 | Ingrid Schjelderup |
| CM | 4 | Gry Tofte Ims | (substituted off) 46' |
| CM | 17 | Lene Mykjåland |
| RF | 19 | Kristine Minde | (substituted off) 60' |
| CF | 9 | Isabell Herlovsen | (substituted off) 90+2' |
| LF | 21 | Ada Hegerberg |
Substitutions:
| MF | 8 | Solveig Gulbrandsen | (substituted on) 46' |
| FW | 16 | Elise Thorsnes | (substituted on) 60' |
| FW | 20 | Emilie Haavi | (substituted on) 90+2' |
Manager:
Even Pellerud

Player of the Match:
Dzsenifer Marozsán (Germany)

Assistant referees:
Petruța Iugulescu (Romania)
Mária Súkeníková (Slovakia)
Fourth official:
Anna-Marie Keighley (New Zealand)
Fifth official:
Lata Kaumatule (Tonga)

=== Ivory Coast vs Thailand ===
This was the first ever win for a Southeast Asian country (excluding Australia which geographically is not in Southeast Asia) at a senior World Cup (male or female).

11 June 2015
19:00 EDT (UTC−4)

| Ivory Coast | 2–3 | Thailand |
|---|---|---|
| N'Guessan 4'; Nahi 88' | Report | Orathai 26', 45+3'; Thanatta 75' |

TD Place Stadium, Ottawa
Attendance: 18,987
Referee: Margaret Domka (United States)

| Ivory Coast | Thailand |

| GK | 16 | Dominique Thiamale (c) |
| RB | 22 | Raymonde Kacou |
| CB | 2 | Fatou Coulibaly |
| CB | 3 | Djelika Coulibaly |
| LB | 13 | Fernande Tchetche |
| CM | 15 | Christine Lohoues |
| CM | 12 | Ida Guehai | | (substituted off) 81' |
| CM | 6 | Rita Akaffou | | (substituted off) 46' |
| RF | 10 | Ange N'Guessan |
| CF | 8 | Ines Nrehy |
| LF | 18 | Binta Diakité | | (substituted off) 34' |
Substitutions:
| FW | 14 | Josée Nahi | | (substituted on) 34' |
| FW | 11 | Rebecca Elloh | | (substituted on) 46' |
| MF | 19 | Jessica Aby | (yellow card) 90+4' | (substituted on) 81' |
Manager:
Clémentine Touré

| GK | 1 | Waraporn Boonsing |
| RB | 9 | Warunee Phetwiset |
| CB | 4 | Duangnapa Sritala (c) |
| CB | 3 | Natthakarn Chinwong | (substituted off) 90+7' |
| LB | 10 | Sunisa Srangthaisong |
| CM | 6 | Pikul Khueanpet |
| CM | 7 | Silawan Intamee |
| RW | 21 | Kanjana Sungngoen |
| AM | 13 | Orathai Srimanee | (substituted off) 73' |
| LW | 17 | Anootsara Maijarern |
| CF | 23 | Nisa Romyen | (substituted off) 43' |
Substitutions:
| MF | 12 | Rattikan Thongsombut | (substituted on) 43' |
| FW | 14 | Thanatta Chawong | (substituted on) 73' |
| DF | 2 | Darut Changplook | (substituted on) 90+7' |
Manager:
Nuengruethai Sathongwien

Player of the Match:
Orathai Srimanee (Thailand)

Assistant referees:
Princess Brown (Jamaica)
Elizabeth Aguilar (El Salvador)
Fourth official:
Olga Miranda (Paraguay)
Fifth official:
Lata Kaumatule (Tonga)

=== Thailand vs Germany ===
15 June 2015
15:00 CDT (UTC−5)

| Thailand | 0–4 | Germany |
|---|---|---|
| | Report | Leupolz 24'; Petermann 56', 58'; Däbritz 73' |

Investors Group Field, Winnipeg
Attendance: 26,191
Referee: Gladys Lengwe (Zambia)

| Thailand | Germany |

| GK | 1 | Waraporn Boonsing |
| RB | 9 | Warunee Phetwiset |
| CB | 3 | Natthakarn Chinwong |
| CB | 4 | Duangnapa Sritala (c) |
| LB | 10 | Sunisa Srangthaisong |
| CM | 6 | Pikul Khueanpet |
| CM | 7 | Silawan Intamee |
| RW | 12 | Rattikan Thongsombut | | (substituted off) 89' |
| LW | 17 | Anootsara Maijarern | (yellow card) 82' | (substituted off) 87' |
| SS | 13 | Orathai Srimanee | | (substituted off) 79' |
| CF | 21 | Kanjana Sungngoen |
Substitutions:
| MF | 20 | Wilaiporn Boothduang | | (substituted on) 79' |
| FW | 11 | Alisa Rukpinij | | (substituted on) 87' |
| DF | 2 | Darut Changplook | | (substituted on) 89' |
Manager:
Nuengruethai Sathongwien

| GK | 1 | Nadine Angerer (c) |
| RB | 2 | Bianca Schmidt |
| CB | 5 | Annike Krahn | (substituted off) 61' |
| CB | 14 | Babett Peter |
| LB | 15 | Jennifer Cramer |
| CM | 16 | Melanie Leupolz |
| CM | 7 | Melanie Behringer |
| RW | 9 | Lena Lotzen |
| AM | 10 | Dzsenifer Marozsán | (substituted off) 46' |
| LW | 23 | Sara Däbritz |
| CF | 13 | Célia Šašić | (substituted off) 46' |
Substitutions:
| FW | 11 | Anja Mittag | (substituted on) 46' |
| FW | 19 | Lena Petermann | (substituted on) 46' |
| DF | 17 | Josephine Henning | (substituted on) 61' |
Manager:
Silvia Neid

Player of the Match:
Melanie Leupolz (Germany)

Assistant referees:
Lidwine Rakotozafinoro (Madagascar)
Bernadettar Kwimbira (Malawi)
Fourth official:
Pernilla Larsson (Sweden)
Fifth official:
Anna Nyström (Sweden)

=== Ivory Coast vs Norway ===
15 June 2015
17:00 ADT (UTC−3)

| Ivory Coast | 1–3 | Norway |
|---|---|---|
| N'Guessan 71' | Report | Hegerberg 6', 62'; Gulbrandsen 67' |

Moncton Stadium, Moncton
Attendance: 7,147
Referee: Salomé di Iorio (Argentina)

| Ivory Coast | Norway |

| GK | 23 | Cynthia Djohore |
| RB | 17 | Nadège Cissé | | (substituted off) 68' |
| CB | 2 | Fatou Coulibaly (c) | (yellow card) 25' |
| CB | 3 | Djelika Coulibaly |
| LB | 13 | Fernande Tchetche |
| CM | 15 | Christine Lohoues | | (substituted off) 90+3' |
| CM | 12 | Ida Guehai |
| CM | 11 | Rebecca Elloh |
| RF | 14 | Josée Nahi |
| CF | 8 | Ines Nrehy |
| LF | 10 | Ange N'Guessan |
Substitutions:
| MF | 18 | Binta Diakité | | (substituted on) 68' (substituted off) 90+2' |
| FW | 7 | Nadege Essoh | | (substituted on) 90+2' |
| MF | 6 | Rita Akaffou | | (substituted on) 90+3' |
Manager:
Clémentine Touré

| GK | 1 | Ingrid Hjelmseth (c) | | (substituted off) 79' |
| RB | 16 | Elise Thorsnes |
| CB | 3 | Marita Skammelsrud Lund |
| CB | 2 | Maria Thorisdottir |
| LB | 19 | Kristine Minde | | (substituted off) 46' |
| CM | 8 | Solveig Gulbrandsen |
| CM | 14 | Ingrid Schjelderup |
| CM | 17 | Lene Mykjåland |
| RF | 5 | Lisa-Marie Karlseng Utland | | (substituted off) 64' |
| CF | 21 | Ada Hegerberg |
| LF | 20 | Emilie Haavi | (yellow card) 52' |
Substitutions:
| DF | 13 | Ingrid Moe Wold | | (substituted on) 46' |
| MF | 6 | Maren Mjelde | | (substituted on) 64' |
| GK | 12 | Silje Vesterbekkmo | | (substituted on) 79' |
Manager:
Even Pellerud

Player of the Match:
Ada Hegerberg (Norway)

Assistant referees:
Maria Rocco (Argentina)
Mariana de Almeida (Argentina)
Fourth official:
Ledya Tafesse (Ethiopia)
Fifth official:
Mana Dzodope (Togo)

== See also ==
- Germany at the FIFA Women's World Cup
- Ivory Coast at the FIFA Women's World Cup
- Norway at the FIFA Women's World Cup
- Thailand at the FIFA Women's World Cup
