= Thailand at the FIFA Women's World Cup =

The Thailand women's national football team has represented Thailand at the FIFA Women's World Cup at two stagings of the tournament; they have appeared in the last two tournaments, held in 2015 and 2019.

== FIFA Women's World Cup record ==
FIFA Women's World Cup finals record										Qualifications record					
Year	Host country	Result	Position	GP	W	D*	L	GS	GA	GP	W	D	L	GS	GA
1991	China	Did not qualify								3	1	1	1	4	10
1995	Sweden	Did not enter								Did not enter					
1999	United States	Did not enter								Did not enter					
2003	United States	Did not qualify								4	2	0	2	6	21
2007	China	Did not qualify								6	3	0	3	10	26
2011	Germany	Did not qualify								5	3	0	2	16	9
2015	Canada	Group stage	17th	3	1	0	2	3	10	7	5	0	2	19	14
2019	France	Group stage	24th	3	0	0	3	1	20	7	4	1	2	19	11
2023	Australia; New Zealand	Did not qualify								8	3	0	5	16	15
2027	Brazil	To be determined								To be determined					
2031	Costa Rica; Jamaica; Mexico; United States	To be determined								To be determined					
2035	United Kingdom	To be determined								To be determined					
Total		2/12	Best: 17th	6	1	0	5	4	30	40	21	2	17	90	106

FIFA Women's World Cup history
Year	Round	Date	Opponent	Result	Stadium
(Canada) 2015	Group stage	7 June	Norway	L 0–4	Lansdowne Stadium, Ottawa
(Canada) 2015	Group stage	11 June	Ivory Coast	W 3–2	Lansdowne Stadium, Ottawa
(Canada) 2015	Group stage	15 June	Germany	L 0–4	Moncton Stadium, Moncton
(France) 2019	Group stage	11 June	United States	L 0–13	Stade Auguste-Delaune, Reims
(France) 2019	Group stage	16 June	Sweden	L 1–5	Allianz Riviera, Nice
(France) 2019	Group stage	20 June	Chile	L 0–2	Roazhon Park, Rennes

=== Record by opponent ===
FIFA Women's World Cup matches (by team)
Opponent	Pld	W	D	L	GF	GA
Chile	1	0	0	1	0	2
Germany	1	0	0	1	0	4
Ivory Coast	1	1	0	0	3	2
Norway	1	0	0	1	0	4
Sweden	1	0	0	1	1	5
United States	1	0	0	1	0	13

== 2015 FIFA Women's World Cup ==
=== Group B ===
Pos	Team	Pld	W	D	L	GF	GA	GD	Pts	Qualification
1	Germany	3	2	1	0	15	1	+14	7	Advance to knockout stage
2	Norway	3	2	1	0	8	2	+6	7	Advance to knockout stage
3	Thailand	3	1	0	2	3	10	−7	3	
4	Ivory Coast	3	0	0	3	3	16	−13	0	

Source: FIFA
Rules for classification: Group stage tiebreakers
7 June 2015
13:00 EDT (UTC−4)

Norway	4–0	Thailand
Rønning 15'; Herlovsen 29', 34'; Hegerberg 68'	Report

TD Place Stadium, Ottawa
Attendance: 20,953
Referee: Anna-Marie Keighley (New Zealand)

11 June 2015
19:00 EDT (UTC−4)

Ivory Coast	2–3	Thailand
N'Guessan 4'; Nahi 88'	Report	Orathai 26', 45+3'; Thanatta 75'

TD Place Stadium, Ottawa
Attendance: 18,987
Referee: Margaret Domka (United States)

15 June 2015
15:00 CDT (UTC−5)

Thailand	0–4	Germany
	Report	Leupolz 24'; Petermann 56', 58'; Däbritz 73'

Investors Group Field, Winnipeg
Attendance: 26,191
Referee: Gladys Lengwe (Zambia)

== 2019 FIFA Women's World Cup ==
=== Group F ===
Pos	Team	Pld	W	D	L	GF	GA	GD	Pts	Qualification
1	United States	3	3	0	0	18	0	+18	9	Advance to knockout stage
2	Sweden	3	2	0	1	7	3	+4	6	Advance to knockout stage
3	Chile	3	1	0	2	2	5	−3	3	
4	Thailand	3	0	0	3	1	20	−19	0	

Source: FIFA
Rules for classification: Group stage tiebreakers
11 June 2019
21:00

United States	13–0	Thailand
Morgan 12', 53', 74', 81', 87'; Lavelle 20', 56'; Horan 32'; Mewis 50', 54'; Rapinoe 79'; Pugh 85'; Lloyd 90+2'	Report

Stade Auguste-Delaune, Reims
Attendance: 18,591
Referee: Laura Fortunato (Argentina)

16 June 2019
15:00

Sweden	5–1	Thailand
Sembrant 6'; Asllani 19'; Rolfö 42'; Hurtig 81'; Rubensson 90+6' (pen.)	Report	Kanjana 90+1'

Allianz Riviera, Nice
Attendance: 9,354
Referee: Salima Mukansanga (Rwanda)

20 June 2019
21:00

Thailand	0–2	Chile
	Report	Waraporn 48' (o.g.); Urrutia 80'

Roazhon Park, Rennes
Attendance: 13,567
Referee: Anna-Marie Keighley (New Zealand)

== Goalscorers ==
Player	Goals	2015	2019
Orathai Srimanee	2	2	
Thanatta Chawong	1	1	
Kanjana Sungngoen	1		1
Total	4	3	1
