= Ivory Coast at the FIFA Women's World Cup =

The Ivory Coast women's national football team has represented Ivory Coast at the FIFA Women's World Cup on one occasion, in 2015.

== FIFA Women's World Cup results ==
Year	Result	Position	Pld	W	D	L	GF	GA
(China) 1991	Did not enter							
(Sweden) 1995	Did not enter							
(United States) 1999	Did not enter							
(United States) 2003	Did not qualify							
(China) 2007	Did not qualify							
(Germany) 2011	Did not qualify							
(Canada) 2015	Group Stage	23rd	3	0	0	3	3	16
(France) 2019	Did not qualify							
(Australia) (New Zealand) 2023	Did not qualify							
(Brazil) 2027	To be determined							
(Costa Rica) (Jamaica) (Mexico) (United States) 2031	To be determined							
(United Kingdom) 2035	To be determined							
Total	1/12	23rd	3	0	0	3	3	16

FIFA Women's World Cup history
Year	Round	Date	Opponent	Result	Stadium
(Canada) 2015	Group stage	7 June	Germany	L 0–10	TD Place Stadium, Ottawa
(Canada) 2015	Group stage	11 June	Thailand	L 2–3	TD Place Stadium, Ottawa
(Canada) 2015	Group stage	15 June	Norway	L 1–3	Moncton Stadium, Moncton

=== Record by opponent ===
FIFA Women's World Cup matches (by team)
Opponent	Pld	W	D	L	GF	GA
Germany	1	0	0	1	0	10
Norway	1	0	0	1	1	3
Thailand	1	0	0	1	2	3

== 2015 FIFA Women's World Cup ==
=== Group B ===
Pos	Team	Pld	W	D	L	GF	GA	GD	Pts	Qualification
1	Germany	3	2	1	0	15	1	+14	7	Advance to knockout stage
2	Norway	3	2	1	0	8	2	+6	7	Advance to knockout stage
3	Thailand	3	1	0	2	3	10	−7	3	
4	Ivory Coast	3	0	0	3	3	16	−13	0	

Source: FIFA
Rules for classification: Group stage tiebreakers
7 June 2015
16:00 EDT (UTC−4)

Germany	10–0	Ivory Coast
Šašić 3', 14', 31'; Mittag 29', 35', 64'; Laudehr 71'; Däbritz 75'; Behringer 79'; Popp 85'	Report

Lansdowne Stadium, Ottawa
Attendance: 20,953
Referee: Carol Anne Chenard (Canada)
11 June 2015
19:00 EDT (UTC−4)

Ivory Coast	2–3	Thailand
N'Guessan 4'; Nahi 88'	Report	Srimanee 26', 45+3'; Chawong 75'

Lansdowne Stadium, Ottawa
Attendance: 18,987
Referee: Margaret Domka (United States)
15 June 2015
17:00 ADT (UTC−3)

Ivory Coast	1–3	Norway
N'Guessan 71'	Report	Hegerberg 6', 62'; Gulbrandsen 67'

Moncton Stadium, Moncton
Attendance: 7,147
Referee: Salomé di Iorio (Argentina)

== Goalscorers ==
Player	Goals	2015
Ange N'Guessan	2	2
Josée Nahi	1	1
Total	3	3
