= Remund =

Remund may refer to:

- Remund Lake, a lake in Minnesota
- Nicole Remund, a Swiss football player
- Remund or Remunj Is the name of Dutch city of Roermond
