= Nuengrutai Srathongvian =

Thai footballer and field hockey player

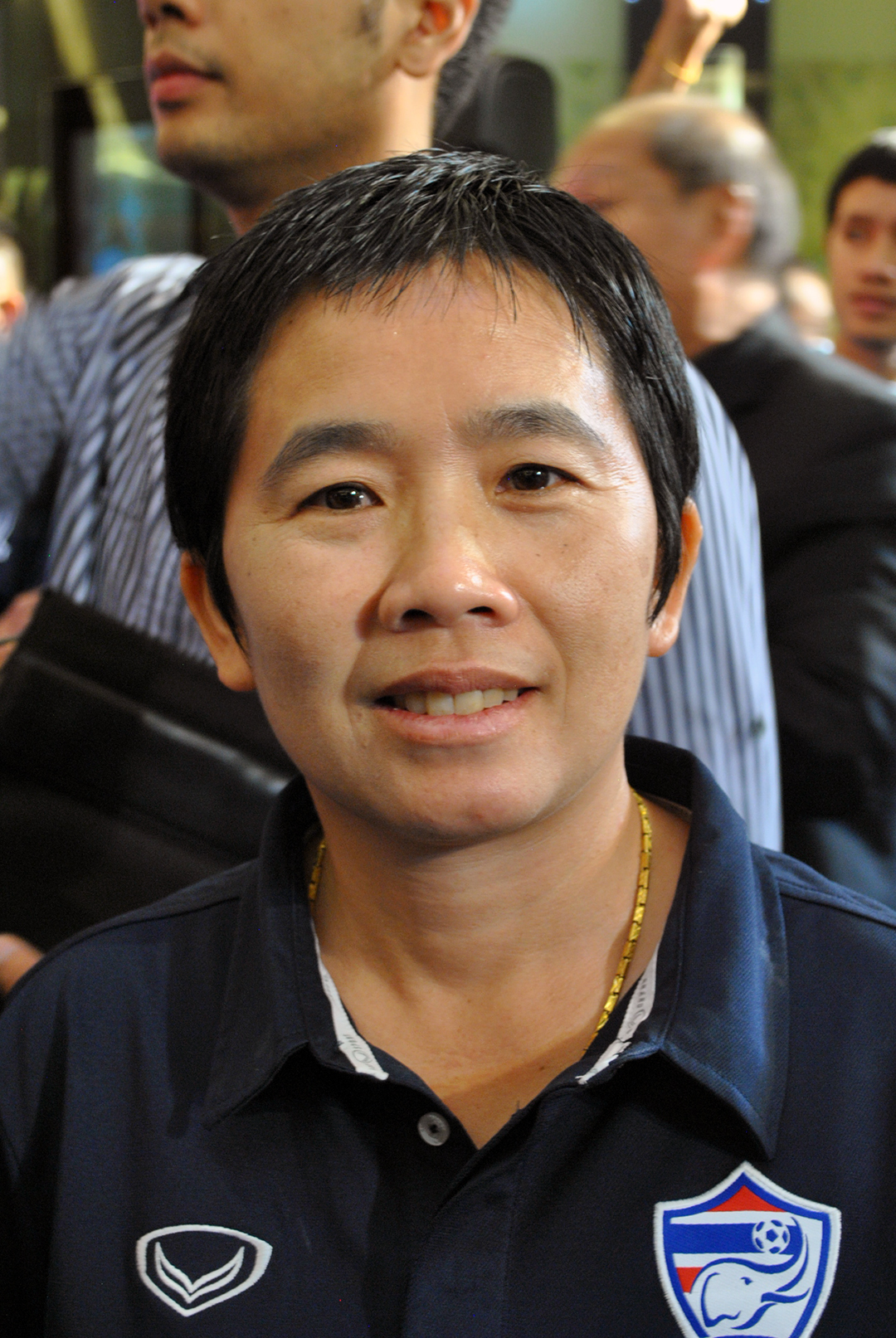
- Srathongvian in 2015

Personal information
- Date of birth: 1 January 1972 (age 54)
- Place of birth: Kamphaeng Saen, Thailand
- Position: Midfielder

Team information
- Current team: Thailand women U20 (manager)

Senior career*
Years	Team	Apps	(Gls)
1992–2001	Police Club		

International career
- Thailand

Managerial career
- 2009: Asian Graduate College
- 2013–2014: Thailand women (assistant)
- 2014: Thailand women U14
- 2014–2015: Thailand women
- 2015: Thailand women U16
- 2017: Thailand women U19
- 2017–2019: Thailand women
- 2019: Ratchaburi Mitr Phol
- 2021–2023: Thailand (assistant)
- 2024–2025: Thailand women (Interim)
- 2025–: Thailand women U20
- 2025–: Thailand women
Field hockey career
Sport	Field hockey
Position	Goalkeeper
National team: Years / Team / Caps / Goals; – / Thailand / / -
Medal record Women's field hockey Representing Thailand Southeast Asian Games: Gold medal – first place / 1995 Chiang Mai / Team
- * Club domestic league appearances and goals

Nuengrutai Srathongvian (Thai: หนึ่งฤทัย สระทองเวียน; RTGS: Nuengruethai Sathongwian; born 1 January 1972), also known as "Coach Nueng" (Thai: โค้ชหนึ่ง), is a Thai football manager and former footballer and field hockey player who is currently the manager of the Thailand women's national under-20 football team.

== Sporting career ==
While attending Kasetsart University, Srathongvian began playing field hockey, as there were few football matches played for year one students. She represented the Thailand women's national field hockey team, winning the gold medal as hosts at the 1995 Southeast Asian Games in Chiang Mai. She later went on to represent the Thailand women's national football team, appearing for the team in the football tournament at the 1998 Asian Games in Bangkok. Hosts Thailand finished last in their group with one point. In club football, she played for Police Club.

== Managerial career ==
Srathongvian previously coached the Asian Graduate College. In 2013, she was appointed as the assistant coach for the women's national team, under head coach Jatuporn Pramualban. In 2014, she replaced Pramualban as head coach following his retirement, becoming the first woman to hold the position. She led the team at the 2014 AFC Women's Asian Cup, finishing the tournament in fifth place after defeating hosts and regional rivals Vietnam. Therefore, the team qualified for the 2015 edition of the FIFA Women's World Cup. It was the first appearance of a Thai team of either gender at an 11-a-side World Cup.

Thailand were drawn into Group B and finished third, having lost 0–4 to Norway and 0–4 to Germany. However, the team won 3–2 against the Ivory Coast, which was their first ever World Cup win.

In September 2015, Srathongvian resigned after Thailand was eliminated in the 2016 Olympics qualifying phase. However, Srathongvian returned to the position in October 2017 following the resignation of Spencer Prior. The team managed to finish fourth at the 2018 AFC Women's Asian Cup in Jordan, thus qualifying for the 2019 FIFA Women's World Cup in France.

Srathongvian has also coached various Thai women's youth selections, including the under-14, under-16 (at the 2015 AFC U-16 Women's Championship) and under-19 (at the 2017 AFC U-19 Women's Championship) teams. In 2019 Ratchaburi sign a contract with Nuengrutai as a head coach make her become the first women who coaching a men team.

In 2019 Ratchaburi Mitr Phol signed a contract with Srathongvian, making her the first woman to coach a men's football team in Thailand.

== Personal life ==
Srathongvian was born in the Thai village of Sra Pattana in Kamphaeng Saen, Nakhon Pathom.

== Managerial statistics ==
As of 17 December 2025

Managerial record by team and tenure
Team	From	To	Record							
Team	From	To	P	W	D	L	GF	GA	GD	Win %
Thailand	9 September 2025	present	5	4	1	0	18	2	+16	80.00
Career totals			5	4	1	0	18	2	+16	80.00
