= Ange N'Guessan =

Ange N'Guessan may refer to:

- Ange N'Guessan (footballer, born 1990), Ivorian women's footballer winger
- Ange N'Guessan (footballer, born 2002), French men's football defender
