= Sarah Nnodim =

Nigerian footballer

Personal information
- Full name: Sarah Ihechiluru Amaka Nnodim
- Date of birth: 25 December 1995 (age 30)
- Place of birth: Nigeria
- Height: 1.59 m (5 ft 2 1/2 in)
- Position: Defender

Team information
- Current team: Nasarawa Amazons
- Number: 13

Senior career*
Years	Team	Apps	(Gls)
- Nasarawa Amazons

International career^{‡}
2010–2012	Nigeria U17	6	(0)
2014	Nigeria U20	6	(0)
2015–	Nigeria	2	(0)
- * Club domestic league appearances and goals ‡ National team caps and goals as of 13:57, 2 July 2015 (UTC)

Sarah Ihechiluru Amaka Nnodim (born 25 December 1995) is a Nigerian footballer who plays for Nasarawa Amazons in the Nigerian Women's Championship. She plays internationally for the Nigeria women's national football team, having previously been a member of the Nigeria women's national under-20 football team which reached the final of the 2014 FIFA U-20 Women's World Cup.

== Career ==
=== Club ===
At club level, she plays for Nasarawa Amazons in the Nigerian Women's Championship.

=== International ===
Nnodim has represented Nigeria at all levels, having played the FIFA U-17 Women's World Cup in 2010 and 2012 as well as the 2014 FIFA U-20 Women's World Cup. At that final tournament, she was part of the team that reached the final but lost against Germany.

She was promoted to the senior squad following that tournament, when she was named in a 33-woman squad list for the 2014 African Women's Championship as one of four "Falconets" players who transitioned to the "Super Falcons". Coach Edwin Okon said at the time of the four, "They’re invited to come and contest for the shirts with other invited players and I strongly believe they’ll justify the invitation."

At senior level she was part of the squad at the 2015 FIFA Women's World Cup. She was sent off in Nigeria's final match of the tournament, when they lost against the United States 1–0 in the third match of the group stage. Nnodim received two yellow cards, both for tackles from behind, leaving Nigeria with 10 women for the final 20 minutes of the game after she brought down American player Sydney Leroux.

== Honours ==
Nigeria U20

Runner-up

- FIFA U-20 Women's World Cup: 2014
