= Natthakarn Chinwong =

Thai footballer (born 1992)

Personal information
- Full name: Natthakarn Chinwong
- Date of birth: 15 March 1992 (age 34)
- Place of birth: Nakhon Phanom, Thailand
- Height: 1.61 m (5 ft 3 1/2 in)
- Position: Defender

International career^{‡}
Years	Team	Apps	(Gls)
2013–2019	Thailand	22	(1)
- ‡ National team caps and goals as of 22:19, 9 June 2019 (UTC)

Natthakarn Chinwong (Thai: ณัฐกานต์ ชินวงศ์, born 15 March 1992) is a Thai former footballer who played as a midfielder.
