= Remund Lake =

Lake in the state of Minnesota, United States

- Location within Minnesota
- Location: Waseca County, Minnesota
- Coordinates: 44°10′40″N 93°29′1″W
- Type: lake

Remund Lake is a lake in Waseca County, in the U.S. state of Minnesota.

It was named for Samuel Remund, a Swiss settler.

== See also ==
- List of lakes in Minnesota
