= Kim Soo-yun =

South Korean footballer

Personal information
- Date of birth: 30 August 1989 (age 37)
- Height: 1.65 m (5 ft 5 in)
- Position: Defender

Senior career*
Years	Team	Apps	(Gls)
2017–2019	Suwon UDC		

International career^{‡}
2006–2019	South Korea	45	(10)
Korean name
Hangul	김수연
RR	Gim Suyeon
MR	Kim Suyŏn
IPA	[kim.su.jʌn]
- * Club domestic league appearances and goals ‡ National team caps and goals as of 19:31, 23 June 2015 (UTC)

Kim Soo-yun (Korean pronunciation: [kim.su.jʌn]; born 30 August 1989) is a South Korean former footballer who played as a defender. She made her debut for the South Korean women's national team in October 2006. She participated at the 2015 FIFA Women's World Cup.
