= Dominique Thiamale =

Ivorian footballer

Dominique Thiamalé
Personal information
- Full name: Ange Marie Dominique Thiamalé
- Date of birth: 20 May 1982 (age 44)
- Place of birth: Abidjan, Ivory Coast
- Height: 1.69 m (5 ft 7 in)
- Position: Goalkeeper

International career^{‡}
Years	Team	Apps	(Gls)
2002–2015	Ivory Coast	29	(0)
- ‡ National team caps and goals as of 11:51, 16 June 2015 (UTC)

Ange Marie Dominique Thiamalé (born 20 May 1982), known as Dominique Thiamalé, is an Ivorian professional footballer. She was part of the Ivorian squad for the 2015 FIFA Women's World Cup.

== See also ==
- List of Ivory Coast women's international footballers
