= 2015 FIFA Women's World Cup =

2015 edition of the FIFA Women's World Cup

Coupe du monde féminine de la FIFA 2015

Tournament details
- Host country: Canada
- Dates: 6 June – 5 July
- Teams: 24 (from 6 confederations)
- Venues: 6 (in 6 host cities)

Final positions
- Champions: United States (3rd title)
- Runners-up: Japan
- Third place: England
- Fourth place: Germany

Tournament statistics
- Matches played: 52
- Goals scored: 146 (2.81 per match)
- Attendance: 1,353,506 (26,029 per match)
- Top scorer(s): (Germany) Célia Šašić (United States) Carli Lloyd (6 goals each)
- Best player: (United States) Carli Lloyd
- Best young player: (Canada) Kadeisha Buchanan
- Best goalkeeper: (United States) Hope Solo
- Fair play award: France

The 2015 FIFA Women's World Cup was the seventh FIFA Women's World Cup, the quadrennial international soccer championship contested by the women's national teams of the member associations of FIFA. The tournament was hosted by Canada for the first time and by a North American country for the third time. Matches were played in six cities across Canada in five time zones. The tournament began on 6 June 2015, and finished with the final on 5 July 2015 with a United States victory over Japan.

The 2015 tournament saw the World Cup expanded to 24 teams from 16 in 2011. Canada's team received direct entry as host and a qualification tournament of 134 teams was held for the remaining 23 places. With the expanded tournament, eight teams made their Women's World Cup debut. All previous Women's World Cup finalists qualified for the tournament, with defending champions Japan and returning champions Germany (2003, 2007) and the United States (1991, 1999) among the seeded teams.

The 2015 tournament used goal-line technology for the first time with the Hawk-Eye system. It was also the first World Cup for either men or women to be played on artificial turf, with all matches played on such surfaces, even though there were some initial concerns over a possible increased risk of injuries.

== Host selection ==
The bidding for each FIFA Women's World Cup typically includes hosting rights for the previous year's FIFA U-20 Women's World Cup (similar to the men's version, in which the host nation stages the Confederations Cup the year before). Bids for the tournament were required to be submitted by December 2010. Only two bids were submitted:

Country
Canada
Zimbabwe (withdrawn)

Zimbabwe withdrew its bid on 1 March 2011. The country was seen as a long shot as its women's team was ranked 103rd in the world at the time of the bid and has never qualified for a Women's World Cup. There was also ongoing political and economic instability in the country.

The selected host, Canada, had previously hosted FIFA tournaments including the 1987 FIFA U-16 World Championship, 2002 FIFA U-19 Women's World Championship, the 2007 FIFA U-20 World Cup, which set an attendance record for that tournament, and most recently the 2014 FIFA U-20 Women's World Cup.

== Qualification ==
For 2015, the number of qualifying teams grew from 16 to 24 and scheduled matches increased from 32 to 52. On 11 June 2012, FIFA announced a change to the allocation of the qualifying berths for its continental confederations. The FIFA Executive Committee approved the following slot allocation and the distribution of eight new slots:

Allocation of slots for the 2015 FIFA Women's World Cup
Confederation/hosts	Continent/country	Slots	Change from 2011
AFC	Asia	5	+2
CAF	Africa	3	+1
CONCACAF	North, Central America and Caribbean	3.5	+1
CONMEBOL	South America	2.5	+0.5
OFC	Oceania	1	±0
UEFA	Europe	8	+3.5
Hosts	Canada	1	–
Total		24	+8

After North Korea had several players test positive for performance-enhancing drugs during the 2011 FIFA Women's World Cup, FIFA banned the North Korean team from participating in the 2015 FIFA Women's World Cup in Canada. This was the first time a team had been banned from a Women's World Cup, and it was the first time since 1995 that North Korea did not participate in a Women's World Cup.

=== Qualified teams ===
The latest published FIFA Rankings prior to the tournament (March 2015) are shown in parentheses.

AFC (5)

- Australia (10)
- China (16)
- Japan (4)
- South Korea (18)
- Thailand (29) (debut)

CAF (3)

- Cameroon (53) (debut)
- Ivory Coast (67) (debut)
- Nigeria (33)

CONCACAF (4)

- Canada (8) (hosts)
- Costa Rica (37) (debut)
- Mexico (25)
- United States (2)

CONMEBOL (3)

- Brazil (7)
- Colombia (28)
- Ecuador (48) (debut)

OFC (1)

- New Zealand (17)

UEFA (8)

- England (6)
- France (3)
- Germany (1)
- Netherlands (12) (debut)
- Norway (11)
- Spain (14) (debut)
- Sweden (5)
- Switzerland (19) (debut)

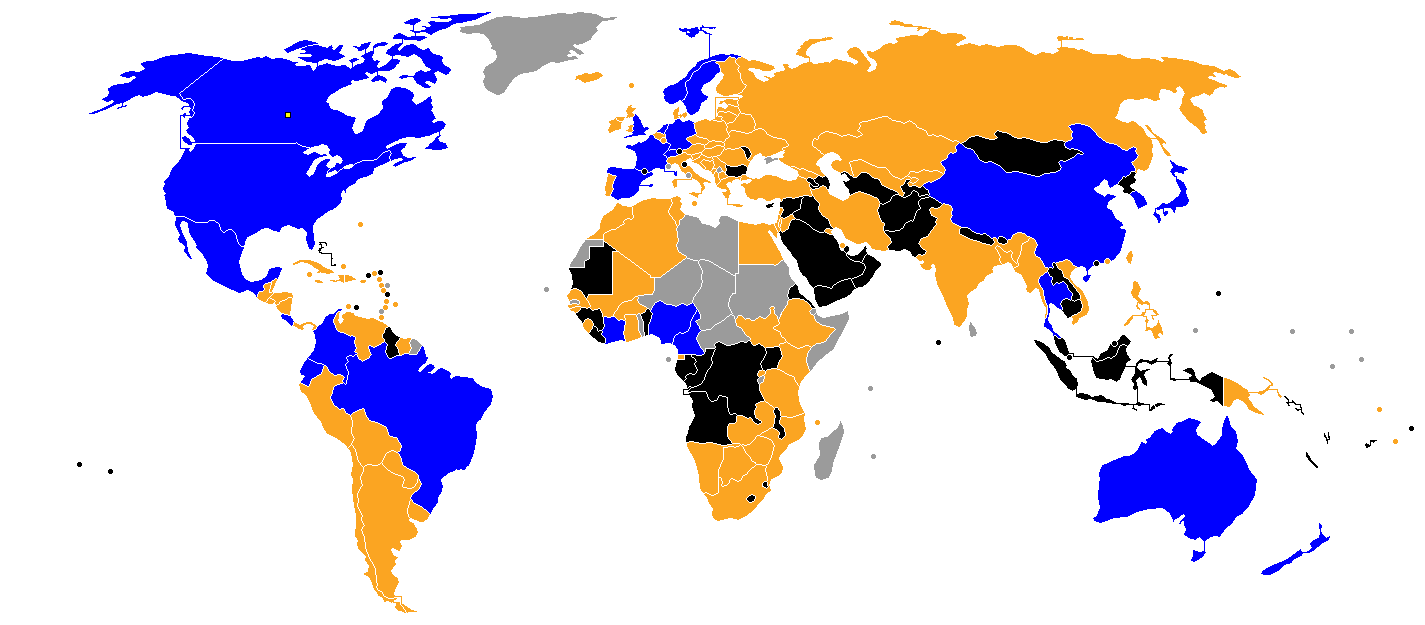
Qualified Did not qualify / Did not enter Women's team inactive

A record eight nations made their Women's World Cup debut, as listed above: Cameroon, Costa Rica, Ecuador, Ivory Coast, Netherlands, Spain, Switzerland, and Thailand. As of 2026, this is the last time Ecuador, Ivory Coast, and Mexico have qualified.

== Venues ==
The cities of Vancouver, Edmonton, Winnipeg, Ottawa, Montreal and Moncton were selected to host tournament matches. Halifax was also considered, but removed itself from contention in March 2012. Toronto decided not to bid, due to potential conflicts with the 2015 Pan American Games. Due to FIFA's policy against commercial sponsorship of stadium names, Investors Group Field in Winnipeg and TD Place Stadium in Ottawa were respectively known as Winnipeg Stadium and Lansdowne Stadium during the tournament. Seating capacities shown in table below are as configured for these FIFA games.

Edmonton	Montreal	Vancouver	Winnipeg
Commonwealth Stadium	Olympic Stadium	BC Place	Investors Group Field (Winnipeg Stadium)
53°33′35″N 113°28′34″W	45°33′28″N 73°33′7″W	49°16′36″N 123°6′43″W	49°48′28″N 97°8′45″W
Capacity: 56,302	Capacity: 56,040	Capacity: 54,320	Capacity: 33,422
Surface: FieldTurf Duraspine	Surface: Xtreme Turf	Surface: Polytan LigaTurf	Surface: FieldTurf Revolution
Time zone: MDT (UTC−6)	Time zone: EDT (UTC−4)	Time zone: PDT (UTC−7)	Time zone: CDT (UTC−5)
2015 FIFA Women's World Cup is located in Canada		Ottawa	Moncton
2015 FIFA Women's World Cup is located in Canada		TD Place Stadium (Lansdowne Stadium)	Moncton Stadium
2015 FIFA Women's World Cup is located in Canada		45°23′53.44″N 75°41′1.14″W	46°6′30″N 64°47′0″W
2015 FIFA Women's World Cup is located in Canada		Capacity: 24,000	Capacity: 13,000
2015 FIFA Women's World Cup is located in Canada		Surface: FieldTurf	Surface: FieldTurf
2015 FIFA Women's World Cup is located in Canada		Time zone: EDT (UTC−4)	Time zone: ADT (UTC−3)

=== Innovations ===
The tournament introduced goal-line technology with the Hawk-Eye system by which it is possible to show on the stadium screen if the ball was in or not. It was also the first World Cup for either men or women to be played on artificial turf, with all matches played on such surfaces. There were some initial concerns over a possible increased risk of injuries from playing on artificial turf, but a legal challenge suggesting matches should be played on grass as in similar men's tournaments was dropped in January 2015.

== Squads ==
Each team's squad for the 2015 FIFA Women's World Cup consisted of 23 players (three of whom had to be goalkeepers), two more than the 2011 tournament, and the same number as men's World Cup squads. Each participating national association was required to confirm its final 23-player squad no later than 10 working days before the start of the tournament. Replacement of seriously injured players was permitted until 24 hours before the team in question's first World Cup game.

The squads were officially announced by FIFA on 28 May 2015. Formiga of Brazil and Homare Sawa of Japan were included in World Cup squads for the sixth time, a record for any men or women players.

== Match officials ==
A total of 29 referees/support referees and 44 assistant referees were selected for the tournament.

Referees
Confederation	Referee
AFC	Rita Gani (Malaysia)
AFC	Qin Liang (China)
AFC	Ri Hyang-ok (North Korea)
AFC	Sachiko Yamagishi (Japan)
CAF	Gladys Lengwe (Zambia)
CAF	Thérèse Neguel (Cameroon)
CONCACAF	Quetzalli Alvarado (Mexico)
CONCACAF	Melissa Borjas (Honduras)
CONCACAF	Carol Anne Chenard (Canada)
CONCACAF	Margaret Domka (United States)
CONCACAF	Lucila Venegas (Mexico)
CONMEBOL	Salomé di Iorio (Argentina)
CONMEBOL	Yeimy Martínez (Colombia)
CONMEBOL	Claudia Umpiérrez (Uruguay)
OFC	Anna-Marie Keighley (New Zealand)
UEFA	Teodora Albon (Romania)
UEFA	Stéphanie Frappart (France)
UEFA	Katalin Kulcsár (Hungary)
UEFA	Pernilla Larsson (Sweden)
UEFA	Efthalia Mitsi (Greece)
UEFA	Kateryna Monzul (Ukraine)
UEFA	Esther Staubli (Switzerland)
UEFA	Bibiana Steinhaus (Germany)
UEFA	Carina Vitulano (Italy)

Fourth officials
Confederation	Referee
AFC	Abirami Naidu (Singapore)
CAF	Lidya Tafesse (Ethiopia)
CONCACAF	Michelle Pye (Canada)
CONMEBOL	Olga Miranda (Paraguay)
OFC	Tupou Patia (Cook Islands)

Assistant referees
Confederation	Assistant referee
AFC	Cui Yongmei (China)
AFC	Fang Yan (China)
AFC	Allyson Flynn (Australia)
AFC	Sarah Ho (Australia)
AFC	Hong Kum-nyo (North Korea)
AFC	Kim Kyoung-min (South Korea)
AFC	Widiya Habibah Shamsuri (Malaysia)
AFC	Naomi Teshirogi (Japan)
CAF	Ayawa Dzodope (Togo)
CAF	Bernadettar Kwimbira (Malawi)
CAF	Souad Oulhaj (Morocco)
CAF	Lidwine Rakotozafinoro (Madagascar)
CONCACAF	Elizabeth Aguilar (El Salvador)
CONCACAF	Princess Brown (Jamaica)
CONCACAF	Enedina Caudillo (Mexico)
CONCACAF	Marie-Josée Charbonneau (Canada)
CONCACAF	Mayte Chávez (Mexico)
CONCACAF	Kimberly Moreira (Costa Rica)
CONCACAF	Suzanne Morisset (Canada)
CONCACAF	Shirley Perelló (Honduras)
CONMEBOL	Janette Arcanjo (Brazil)
CONMEBOL	Liliana Bejarano (Bolivia)
CONMEBOL	Mariana de Almeida (Argentina)
CONMEBOL	Luciana Mascaraña (Uruguay)
CONMEBOL	María Rocco (Argentina)
CONMEBOL	Loreto Toloza (Chile)
OFC	Lata Kaumatule (Tonga)
OFC	Sarah Walker (New Zealand)
UEFA	Natalie Aspinall (England)
UEFA	Ella De Vries (Belgium)
UEFA	Petruța Iugulescu (Romania)
UEFA	Chrysoula Kourompylia (Greece)
UEFA	Angela Kyriakou (Cyprus)
UEFA	Manuela Nicolosi (France)
UEFA	Anna Nyström (Sweden)
UEFA	Michelle O'Neill (Republic of Ireland)
UEFA	Tonja Paavola (Finland)
UEFA	Yolanda Parga Rodríguez (Spain)
UEFA	Nataliya Rachynska (Ukraine)
UEFA	Katrin Rafalski (Germany)
UEFA	Lucie Ratajová (Czech Republic)
UEFA	Sanja Rođak-Karšić (Croatia)
UEFA	Mária Súkeníková (Slovakia)
UEFA	Marina Wozniak (Germany)

== Draw ==
The draw was held on 6 December 2014 at 12:00 Eastern Standard Time at the Canadian Museum of Nature in Ottawa, Ontario, Canada. The seeding pots were announced the day before. Because UEFA qualified eight teams into the final tournament, which had only six groups, two groups by necessity had to contain two European teams. Otherwise, no group could have more than one team from any confederation. Despite having a lower FIFA ranking than Sweden and England, Brazil was seeded ahead of both for "geographical reasons". Before the draw, the Organizing Committee placed the seeded teams in the following groups: Germany in Group B, Japan in Group C, United States in Group D, Brazil in Group E, and France in Group F; Canada were already in Group A as the tournament host. Not drawing the groups for the seeded teams has drawn some criticism. A FIFA spokesperson later confirmed that teams were allocated to certain groups for promotional reasons.

The group of death for this FIFA World Cup was Group D with three top 10-ranked teams, USA (2), Sweden (5), and Australia (10).

The four draw pots of the tournament
Pot 1 (Seeds)	Pot 2 (CAF, CONCACAF, OFC)	Pot 3 (AFC, CONMEBOL)	Pot 4 (UEFA)
Canada (hosts); Brazil; France; Germany; Japan (title holders); United States	Cameroon; Ivory Coast; Nigeria; Costa Rica; Mexico; New Zealand	Australia; China; South Korea; Thailand; Colombia; Ecuador	England; Netherlands; Norway; Spain; Sweden; Switzerland

== Group stage ==
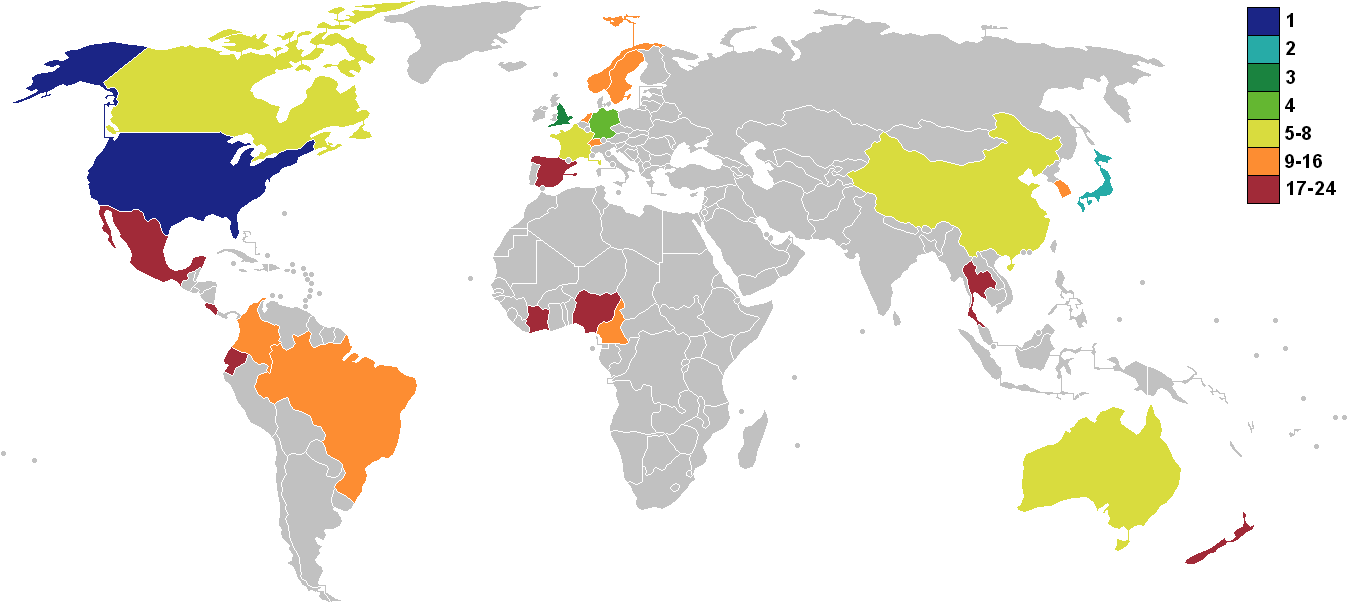
Champion Runner-up / Third place Fourth place / Quarter-finals Round of 16 / Group stage

The 24 teams of the tournament were arranged into 6 groups labelled A to F. The provisional match schedule for the tournament was released on 21 March 2013, with the hosts, Canada, placed in position A1. The final schedule with match times was released on the same day right after the draw was made.

The first round, or group stage, saw the twenty four teams divided into six groups of four teams. Each group was played in a round-robin-format of six games, where each team played one match against each of the other teams in the same group. Teams were awarded three points for a win, one point for a draw and none for a defeat. The winners and runners-up from each group, as well as the best four third-placed teams, qualified for the first round of the knockout stage.

Tie-breaking criteria for group play
The ranking of teams in the group stage was determined as follows:
1. Points obtained in all group matches (three points for a win, one for a draw, none for a defeat);
2. Goal difference in all group matches;
3. Number of goals scored in all group matches;
4. Points obtained in the matches played between the teams in question;
5. Goal difference in the matches played between the teams in question;
6. Number of goals scored in the matches played between the teams in question;
7. Drawing of lots.

=== Group A ===
Pos	Team	Pld	W	D	L	GF	GA	GD	Pts	Qualification
1	Canada (H)	3	1	2	0	2	1	+1	5	Advance to knockout stage
2	China	3	1	1	1	3	3	0	4	Advance to knockout stage
3	Netherlands	3	1	1	1	2	2	0	4	Advance to knockout stage
4	New Zealand	3	0	2	1	2	3	−1	2	

Source: FIFA
(H) Hosts
6 June 2015
16:00 MDT (UTC−6)

Canada	1–0	China
Sinclair 90+2' (pen.)	Report

Commonwealth Stadium, Edmonton
Attendance: 53,058
Referee: Kateryna Monzul (Ukraine)
6 June 2015
19:00 MDT (UTC−6)

New Zealand	0–1	Netherlands
	Report	Martens 33'

Commonwealth Stadium, Edmonton
Attendance: 53,058
Referee: Quetzalli Alvarado (Mexico)

11 June 2015
16:00 MDT (UTC−6)

China	1–0	Netherlands
Wang Lisi 90+1'	Report

Commonwealth Stadium, Edmonton
Attendance: 35,544
Referee: Yeimy Martínez (Colombia)
11 June 2015
19:00 MDT (UTC−6)

Canada	0–0	New Zealand
	Report

Commonwealth Stadium, Edmonton
Attendance: 35,544
Referee: Bibiana Steinhaus (Germany)

15 June 2015
19:30 EDT (UTC−4)

Netherlands	1–1	Canada
Van de Ven 87'	Report	Lawrence 10'

Olympic Stadium, Montreal
Attendance: 45,420
Referee: Ri Hyang-ok (North Korea)
15 June 2015
18:30 CDT (UTC−5)

China	2–2	New Zealand
Wang Lisi 41' (pen.); Wang Shanshan 60'	Report	Stott 28'; Wilkinson 64'

Investors Group Field, Winnipeg
Attendance: 26,191
Referee: Katalin Kulcsár (Hungary)

=== Group B ===
Pos	Team	Pld	W	D	L	GF	GA	GD	Pts	Qualification
1	Germany	3	2	1	0	15	1	+14	7	Advance to knockout stage
2	Norway	3	2	1	0	8	2	+6	7	Advance to knockout stage
3	Thailand	3	1	0	2	3	10	−7	3	
4	Ivory Coast	3	0	0	3	3	16	−13	0	

Source: FIFA
7 June 2015
13:00 EDT (UTC−4)

Norway	4–0	Thailand
Rønning 15'; Herlovsen 29', 34'; Hegerberg 68'	Report

TD Place Stadium, Ottawa
Attendance: 20,953
Referee: Anna-Marie Keighley (New Zealand)
7 June 2015
16:00 EDT (UTC−4)

Germany	10–0	Ivory Coast
Šašić 3', 14', 31'; Mittag 29', 35', 64'; Laudehr 71'; Däbritz 75'; Behringer 79'; Popp 85'	Report

TD Place Stadium, Ottawa
Attendance: 20,953
Referee: Carol Anne Chenard (Canada)

11 June 2015
16:00 EDT (UTC−4)

Germany	1–1	Norway
Mittag 6'	Report	Mjelde 61'

TD Place Stadium, Ottawa
Attendance: 18,987
Referee: Teodora Albon (Romania)
11 June 2015
19:00 EDT (UTC−4)

Ivory Coast	2–3	Thailand
N'Guessan 4'; Nahi 88'	Report	Orathai 26', 45+3'; Thanatta 75'

TD Place Stadium, Ottawa
Attendance: 18,987
Referee: Margaret Domka (United States)

15 June 2015
15:00 CDT (UTC−5)

Thailand	0–4	Germany
	Report	Leupolz 24'; Petermann 56', 58'; Däbritz 73'

Investors Group Field, Winnipeg
Attendance: 26,191
Referee: Gladys Lengwe (Zambia)
15 June 2015
17:00 ADT (UTC−3)

Ivory Coast	1–3	Norway
N'Guessan 71'	Report	Hegerberg 6', 62'; Gulbrandsen 67'

Moncton Stadium, Moncton
Attendance: 7,147
Referee: Salomé di Iorio (Argentina)

=== Group C ===
Pos	Team	Pld	W	D	L	GF	GA	GD	Pts	Qualification
1	Japan	3	3	0	0	4	1	+3	9	Advance to knockout stage
2	Cameroon	3	2	0	1	9	3	+6	6	Advance to knockout stage
3	Switzerland	3	1	0	2	11	4	+7	3	Advance to knockout stage
4	Ecuador	3	0	0	3	1	17	−16	0	

Source: FIFA
8 June 2015
16:00 PDT (UTC−7)

Cameroon	6–0	Ecuador
Ngono Mani 34'; Enganamouit 36', 73', 90+4' (pen.); Manie 44' (pen.); Onguéné 79' (pen.)	Report

BC Place, Vancouver
Attendance: 25,942
Referee: Katalin Kulcsár (Hungary)
8 June 2015
19:00 PDT (UTC−7)

Japan	1–0	Switzerland
Miyama 29' (pen.)	Report

BC Place, Vancouver
Attendance: 25,942
Referee: Lucila Venegas (Mexico)

12 June 2015
16:00 PDT (UTC−7)

Switzerland	10–1	Ecuador
Ponce 24', 71' (o.g.); Aigbogun 45+2'; Humm 47', 49', 52'; Bachmann 60' (pen.), 61', 81'; Moser 76'	Report	Ponce 64' (pen.)

BC Place, Vancouver
Attendance: 31,441
Referee: Rita Gani (Malaysia)
12 June 2015
19:00 PDT (UTC−7)

Japan	2–1	Cameroon
Sameshima 6'; Sugasawa 17'	Report	Nchout 90'

BC Place, Vancouver
Attendance: 31,441
Referee: Pernilla Larsson (Sweden)

16 June 2015
16:00 CDT (UTC−5)

Ecuador	0–1	Japan
	Report	Ōgimi 5'

Investors Group Field, Winnipeg
Attendance: 14,522
Referee: Melissa Borjas (Honduras)
16 June 2015
15:00 MDT (UTC−6)

Switzerland	1–2	Cameroon
Crnogorčević 24'	Report	Onguéné 47'; Ngono Mani 62'

Commonwealth Stadium, Edmonton
Attendance: 10,177
Referee: Claudia Umpiérrez (Uruguay)

=== Group D ===
Pos	Team	Pld	W	D	L	GF	GA	GD	Pts	Qualification
1	United States	3	2	1	0	4	1	+3	7	Advance to knockout stage
2	Australia	3	1	1	1	4	4	0	4	Advance to knockout stage
3	Sweden	3	0	3	0	4	4	0	3	Advance to knockout stage
4	Nigeria	3	0	1	2	3	6	−3	1	

Source: FIFA
8 June 2015
15:00 CDT (UTC−5)

Sweden	3–3	Nigeria
Oparanozie 21' (o.g.); Fischer 31'; Sembrant 60'	Report	Okobi 50'; Oshoala 53'; Ordega 87'

Investors Group Field, Winnipeg
Attendance: 31,148
Referee: Ri Hyang-ok (North Korea)
8 June 2015
18:30 CDT (UTC−5)

United States	3–1	Australia
Rapinoe 12', 78'; Press 61'	Report	De Vanna 27'

Investors Group Field, Winnipeg
Attendance: 31,148
Referee: Claudia Umpiérrez (Uruguay)

12 June 2015
16:00 CDT (UTC−5)

Australia	2–0	Nigeria
Simon 29', 68'	Report

Investors Group Field, Winnipeg
Attendance: 32,716
Referee: Stéphanie Frappart (France)
12 June 2015
19:00 CDT (UTC−5)

United States	0–0	Sweden
	Report

Investors Group Field, Winnipeg
Attendance: 32,716
Referee: Sachiko Yamagishi (Japan)

16 June 2015
17:00 PDT (UTC−7)

Nigeria	0–1	United States
	Report	Wambach 45'

BC Place, Vancouver
Attendance: 52,193
Referee: Kateryna Monzul (Ukraine)
16 June 2015
18:00 MDT (UTC−6)

Australia	1–1	Sweden
De Vanna 5'	Report	Jakobsson 15'

Commonwealth Stadium, Edmonton
Attendance: 10,177
Referee: Lucila Venegas (Mexico)

=== Group E ===
Pos	Team	Pld	W	D	L	GF	GA	GD	Pts	Qualification
1	Brazil	3	3	0	0	4	0	+4	9	Advance to knockout stage
2	South Korea	3	1	1	1	4	5	−1	4	Advance to knockout stage
3	Costa Rica	3	0	2	1	3	4	−1	2	
4	Spain	3	0	1	2	2	4	−2	1	

Source: FIFA
9 June 2015
16:00 EDT (UTC−4)

Spain	1–1	Costa Rica
Losada 13'	Report	R. Rodríguez 14'

Olympic Stadium, Montreal
Attendance: 10,175
Referee: Salomé di Iorio (Argentina)
9 June 2015
19:00 EDT (UTC−4)

Brazil	2–0	South Korea
Formiga 33'; Marta 53' (pen.)	Report

Olympic Stadium, Montreal
Attendance: 10,175
Referee: Esther Staubli (Switzerland)

13 June 2015
16:00 EDT (UTC−4)

Brazil	1–0	Spain
Andressa Alves 44'	Report

Olympic Stadium, Montreal
Attendance: 28,623
Referee: Carol Anne Chenard (Canada)
13 June 2015
19:00 EDT (UTC−4)

South Korea	2–2	Costa Rica
Ji So-yun 21' (pen.); Jeon Ga-eul 25'	Report	Herrera 17'; K. Villalobos 89'

Olympic Stadium, Montreal
Attendance: 28,623
Referee: Carina Vitulano (Italy)

17 June 2015
20:00 ADT (UTC−3)

Costa Rica	0–1	Brazil
	Report	Raquel 83'

Moncton Stadium, Moncton
Attendance: 9,543
Referee: Efthalia Mitsi (Greece)
17 June 2015
19:00 EDT (UTC−4)

South Korea	2–1	Spain
Cho So-hyun 53'; Kim Soo-yun 78'	Report	Boquete 29'

TD Place Stadium, Ottawa
Attendance: 21,562
Referee: Anna-Marie Keighley (New Zealand)

=== Group F ===
Pos	Team	Pld	W	D	L	GF	GA	GD	Pts	Qualification
1	France	3	2	0	1	6	2	+4	6	Advance to knockout stage
2	England	3	2	0	1	4	3	+1	6	Advance to knockout stage
3	Colombia	3	1	1	1	4	3	+1	4	Advance to knockout stage
4	Mexico	3	0	1	2	2	8	−6	1	

Source: FIFA
9 June 2015
14:00 ADT (UTC−3)

France	1–0	England
Le Sommer 29'	Report

Moncton Stadium, Moncton
Attendance: 11,686
Referee: Efthalia Mitsi (Greece)
9 June 2015
17:00 ADT (UTC−3)

Colombia	1–1	Mexico
Montoya 82'	Report	V. Pérez 36'

Moncton Stadium, Moncton
Attendance: 11,686
Referee: Thérèse Neguel (Cameroon)

13 June 2015
14:00 ADT (UTC−3)

France	0–2	Colombia
	Report	Andrade 19'; Usme 90+3'

Moncton Stadium, Moncton
Attendance: 13,138
Referee: Qin Liang (China)
13 June 2015
17:00 ADT (UTC−3)

England	2–1	Mexico
Kirby 71'; Carney 82'	Report	Ibarra 90+1'

Moncton Stadium, Moncton
Attendance: 13,138
Referee: Anna-Marie Keighley (New Zealand)

17 June 2015
16:00 EDT (UTC−4)

Mexico	0–5	France
	Report	Delie 1'; Ruiz 9' (o.g.); Le Sommer 13', 36'; Henry 80'

TD Place Stadium, Ottawa
Attendance: 21,562
Referee: Sachiko Yamagishi (Japan)
17 June 2015
16:00 EDT (UTC−4)

England	2–1	Colombia
Carney 15'; Williams 38' (pen.)	Report	Andrade 90+4'

Olympic Stadium, Montreal
Attendance: 13,862
Referee: Carol Anne Chenard (Canada)

=== Ranking of third-placed teams ===
The four best third-placed teams from the six groups advanced to the knockout stage along with the six group winners and six runners-up.

Pos	Grp	Team	Pld	W	D	L	GF	GA	GD	Pts	Qualification
1	F	Colombia	3	1	1	1	4	3	+1	4	Advance to knockout stage
2	A	Netherlands	3	1	1	1	2	2	0	4	Advance to knockout stage
3	C	Switzerland	3	1	0	2	11	4	+7	3	Advance to knockout stage
4	D	Sweden	3	0	3	0	4	4	0	3	Advance to knockout stage
5	B	Thailand	3	1	0	2	3	10	−7	3	
6	E	Costa Rica	3	0	2	1	3	4	−1	2	

Source: FIFA
Rules for classification: 1) Points; 2) Goal difference; 3) Goals scored; 4) Drawing of lots.

== Knockout stage ==
The knockout stage comprised the 16 teams that advanced from the group stage of the tournament. There were four rounds of matches, with each round eliminating half of the teams entering that round. The successive rounds were the round of 16, quarter-finals, semi-finals, and the final. There was also a match to decide third and fourth place. For each game in the knockout stage, any draw at 90 minutes was followed by 30 minutes of extra time; if scores were still level, there was a penalty shoot-out to determine who progressed to the next round. Single yellow cards accrued were cancelled after the quarter-finals, therefore ensuring that no players miss the Final because of receiving a caution in the semi-finals.

Three spots in the 2016 Summer Olympics women's football tournament were filled by the UEFA teams that progressed the furthest in the tournament, other than England. (Note: Even though England were one of the top three UEFA teams in the World Cup, they were not eligible to play at the Olympics. The English Football Association (FA) is affiliated to the British Olympic Association and on 2 March 2015 said it wanted a British Olympic team to compete if England earned a place. Following strong objections from the Scottish, Welsh and Northern Irish football associations, and a commitment from FIFA that they would not allow entry of a British team unless all four Home Nations agreed, the FA announced on 30 March 2015 that they would not seek entry into the Olympic tournament. Similar circumstances prevented them from playing in the 2008 Olympics, when England finished as one of the top three UEFA teams in the 2007 FIFA Women's World Cup. Great Britain did compete in 2012 as the host nation.) Two spots went to France and Germany which both reached the quarter-finals. The third spot was a tie between four teams eliminated in the round of 16: Netherlands, Norway, Sweden and Switzerland. A play-off tournament in March 2016 determined UEFA's third Olympic qualifier to be Sweden.

=== Bracket ===
Round of 16
20 June – Edmonton
China	1
Cameroon	0
22 June – Edmonton
United States	2
Colombia	0
20 June – Ottawa
Germany	4
Sweden	1
21 June – Montreal
France	3
South Korea	0
21 June – Moncton
Brazil	0
Australia	1
23 June – Vancouver
Japan	2
Netherlands	1
22 June – Ottawa
Norway	1
England	2
21 June – Vancouver
Canada	1
Switzerland	0

Quarter-finals
26 June – Ottawa
China	0
United States	1
26 June – Montreal
Germany (p)	1 (5)
France	1 (4)
27 June – Edmonton
Australia	0
Japan	1
27 June – Vancouver
England	2
Canada	1

Semi-finals
30 June – Montreal
United States	2
Germany	0
1 July – Edmonton
Japan	2
England	1

Final
5 July – Vancouver
United States	5
Japan	2
Third place play-off
4 July – Edmonton
Germany	0
England (a.e.t.)	1

=== Round of 16 ===
20 June 2015
16:00 EDT (UTC−4)

Germany	4–1	Sweden
Mittag 24'; Šašić 36' (pen.), 78'; Marozsán 88'	Report	Sembrant 82'

TD Place Stadium, Ottawa
Attendance: 22,486
Referee: Ri Hyang-ok (North Korea)

20 June 2015
17:30 MDT (UTC−6)

China	1–0	Cameroon
Wang Shanshan 12'	Report

Commonwealth Stadium, Edmonton
Attendance: 15,958
Referee: Bibiana Steinhaus (Germany)

21 June 2015
14:00 ADT (UTC−3)

Brazil	0–1	Australia
	Report	Simon 80'

Moncton Stadium, Moncton
Attendance: 12,054
Referee: Teodora Albon (Romania)

21 June 2015
16:00 EDT (UTC−4)

France	3–0	South Korea
Delie 4', 48'; Thomis 8'	Report

Olympic Stadium, Montreal
Attendance: 15,518
Referee: Salomé di Iorio (Argentina)

21 June 2015
16:30 PDT (UTC−7)

Canada	1–0	Switzerland
Bélanger 52'	Report

BC Place, Vancouver
Attendance: 53,855
Referee: Anna-Marie Keighley (New Zealand)

22 June 2015
17:00 EDT (UTC−4)

Norway	1–2	England
Gulbrandsen 54'	Report	Houghton 61'; Bronze 76'

TD Place Stadium, Ottawa
Attendance: 19,829
Referee: Esther Staubli (Switzerland)

22 June 2015
18:00 MDT (UTC−6)

United States	2–0	Colombia
Morgan 53'; Lloyd 66' (pen.)	Report

Commonwealth Stadium, Edmonton
Attendance: 19,412
Referee: Stéphanie Frappart (France)

23 June 2015
19:00 PDT (UTC−7)

Japan	2–1	Netherlands
Ariyoshi 10'; Sakaguchi 78'	Report	Van de Ven 90+2'

BC Place, Vancouver
Attendance: 28,717
Referee: Lucila Venegas (Mexico)

=== Quarter-finals ===
26 June 2015
16:00 EDT (UTC−4)

Germany	1–1 (a.e.t.)	France
Šašić 84' (pen.)	Report	Nécib 64'
Penalties
Behringer (penalty scored); Laudehr (penalty scored); Peter (penalty scored); Marozsán (penalty scored); Šašić (penalty scored)	5–4	(penalty scored) Thiney; (penalty scored) Abily; (penalty scored) Nécib; (penalty scored) Renard; (penalty missed) Lavogez

Olympic Stadium, Montreal
Attendance: 24,859
Referee: Carol Anne Chenard (Canada)

26 June 2015
19:30 EDT (UTC−4)

China	0–1	United States
	Report	Lloyd 51'

TD Place Stadium, Ottawa
Attendance: 24,141
Referee: Carina Vitulano (Italy)

27 June 2015
14:00 MDT (UTC−6)

Australia	0–1	Japan
	Report	Iwabuchi 87'

Commonwealth Stadium, Edmonton
Attendance: 19,814
Referee: Kateryna Monzul (Ukraine)

27 June 2015
16:30 PDT (UTC−7)

England	2–1	Canada
Taylor 11'; Bronze 14'	Report	Sinclair 42'

BC Place, Vancouver
Attendance: 54,027
Referee: Claudia Umpiérrez (Uruguay)

=== Semi-finals ===
30 June 2015
19:00 EDT (UTC−4)

United States	2–0	Germany
Lloyd 69' (pen.); O'Hara 84'	Report

Olympic Stadium, Montreal
Attendance: 51,176
Referee: Teodora Albon (Romania)

1 July 2015
17:00 MDT (UTC−6)

Japan	2–1	England
Miyama 33' (pen.); Bassett 90+2' (o.g.)	Report	Williams 40' (pen.)

Commonwealth Stadium, Edmonton
Attendance: 31,467
Referee: Anna-Marie Keighley (New Zealand)

=== Third place play-off ===
4 July 2015
14:00 MDT (UTC−6)

Germany	0–1 (a.e.t.)	England
	Report	Williams 108' (pen.)

Commonwealth Stadium, Edmonton
Attendance: 21,483
Referee: Ri Hyang-ok (North Korea)

=== Final ===
5 July 2015
16:00 PDT (UTC−7)

United States	5–2	Japan
Lloyd 3', 5', 16'; Holiday 14'; Heath 54'	Report	Ōgimi 27'; Johnston 52' (o.g.)

BC Place, Vancouver
Attendance: 53,341
Referee: Kateryna Monzul (Ukraine)

== Awards ==
The following awards were given at the conclusion of the tournament. The Golden Ball (best overall player), Golden Boot (top scorer) and Golden Glove (best goalkeeper) awards were sponsored by Adidas, while the Best Young Player and Goal of the Tournament awards were sponsored by Hyundai Motor Company. FIFA.com shortlisted twelve goals for users to vote on as the tournaments' best, with the poll closing on 13 July 2015.

Golden Ball	Silver Ball	Bronze Ball
(United States) Carli Lloyd	(France) Amandine Henry	(Japan) Aya Miyama
Golden Boot	Silver Boot	Bronze Boot
(Germany) Célia Šašić	(United States) Carli Lloyd	(Germany) Anja Mittag
6 goals, 1 assist 553 minutes played	6 goals, 1 assist 630 minutes played	5 goals, 2 assists 474 minutes played
Golden Glove
(United States) Hope Solo
Best Young Player
(Canada) Kadeisha Buchanan
Goal of the Tournament
(United States) Carli Lloyd
16' for 4–0 in Final vs Japan (5 July)
FIFA Fair Play Award
France

On 2 July 2015, following the semi-finals, FIFA announced the shortlists for three of the tournament awards. The following candidates were ultimately not selected:

- Golden Ball: Saori Ariyoshi (Japan), Lucy Bronze (England), Julie Johnston (United States), Megan Rapinoe (United States), Célia Šašić (Germany)
- Golden Glove: Nadine Angerer (Germany), Ayumi Kaihori (Japan)
- Best Young Player: Ada Hegerberg (Norway), Tang Jiali (China)

=== All-Star Squad ===
The All-Star Squad elected by FIFA's Technical Study Group consists of the following players:

Goalkeepers	Defenders	Midfielders	Forwards
(England) Karen Bardsley (Germany) Nadine Angerer (United States) Hope Solo	(Canada) Kadeisha Buchanan (England) Lucy Bronze (England) Steph Houghton (France) Wendie Renard (Japan) Saori Ariyoshi (United States) Julie Johnston (United States) Meghan Klingenberg	(Australia) Elise Kellond-Knight (France) Amandine Henry (France) Eugénie Le Sommer (Japan) Aya Miyama (Japan) Mizuho Sakaguchi (Japan) Rumi Utsugi (United States) Carli Lloyd (United States) Megan Rapinoe	(Australia) Lisa De Vanna (France) Élodie Thomis (Germany) Anja Mittag (Germany) Célia Šašić (Switzerland) Ramona Bachmann

=== Dream Team ===
The Dream Team elected by users of fifa.com consists of the following players and manager:

Goalkeepers	Defenders	Midfielders	Forwards	Manager
(United States) Hope Solo	(Canada) Kadeisha Buchanan (France) Wendie Renard (United States) Julie Johnston (United States) Ali Krieger	(Japan) Aya Miyama (United States) Carli Lloyd (United States) Megan Rapinoe	(Germany) Anja Mittag (Germany) Célia Šašić (United States) Alex Morgan	(Germany) Silvia Neid

=== Prize money ===
The total prize money offered by FIFA for the tournament was US$15 million. The winning team, United States, received $2 million.

== Statistics ==
=== Goalscorers ===
There were 146 goals scored in 52 matches, for an average of 2.81 goals per match. Célia Šašić of Germany and Carli Lloyd of the United States finished as the top scorers with six goals.

6 goals

- (Germany) Célia Šašić
- (United States) Carli Lloyd

5 goals

- (Germany) Anja Mittag

3 goals

- (Australia) Kyah Simon
- (Cameroon) Gaëlle Enganamouit
- (England) Fara Williams
- (France) Marie-Laure Delie
- (France) Eugénie Le Sommer
- (Norway) Ada Hegerberg
- (Switzerland) Ramona Bachmann
- (Switzerland) Fabienne Humm

2 goals

- (Australia) Lisa De Vanna
- (Cameroon) Madeleine Ngono Mani
- (Cameroon) Gabrielle Onguéné
- (Canada) Christine Sinclair
- (China) Wang Lisi
- (China) Wang Shanshan
- (Colombia) Lady Andrade
- (England) Lucy Bronze
- (England) Karen Carney
- (Germany) Sara Däbritz
- (Germany) Lena Petermann
- (Ivory Coast) Ange N'Guessan
- (Japan) Aya Miyama
- (Japan) Yūki Ōgimi
- (Netherlands) Kirsten van de Ven
- (Norway) Solveig Gulbrandsen
- (Norway) Isabell Herlovsen
- (Sweden) Linda Sembrant
- (Thailand) Orathai Srimanee
- (United States) Megan Rapinoe

1 goal

- (Brazil) Andressa Alves
- (Brazil) Formiga
- (Brazil) Marta
- (Brazil) Raquel
- (Cameroon) Christine Manie
- (Cameroon) Ajara Nchout
- (Canada) Josée Bélanger
- (Canada) Ashley Lawrence
- (Colombia) Daniela Montoya
- (Colombia) Catalina Usme
- (Costa Rica) Melissa Herrera
- (Costa Rica) Raquel Rodríguez
- (Costa Rica) Karla Villalobos
- (Ecuador) Angie Ponce
- (England) Steph Houghton
- (England) Fran Kirby
- (England) Jodie Taylor
- (France) Amandine Henry
- (France) Louisa Nécib
- (France) Élodie Thomis
- (Germany) Melanie Behringer
- (Germany) Simone Laudehr
- (Germany) Melanie Leupolz
- (Germany) Dzsenifer Marozsán
- (Germany) Alexandra Popp
- (Ivory Coast) Josée Nahi
- (Japan) Saori Ariyoshi
- (Japan) Mana Iwabuchi
- (Japan) Mizuho Sakaguchi
- (Japan) Aya Sameshima
- (Japan) Yuika Sugasawa
- (Mexico) Fabiola Ibarra
- (Mexico) Verónica Pérez
- (Netherlands) Lieke Martens
- (New Zealand) Rebekah Stott
- (New Zealand) Hannah Wilkinson
- (Nigeria) Ngozi Okobi
- (Nigeria) Francisca Ordega
- (Nigeria) Asisat Oshoala
- (Norway) Maren Mjelde
- (Norway) Trine Rønning
- (South Korea) Cho So-hyun
- (South Korea) Jeon Ga-eul
- (South Korea) Ji So-yun
- (South Korea) Kim Soo-yun
- (Spain) Verónica Boquete
- (Spain) Vicky Losada
- (Sweden) Nilla Fischer
- (Sweden) Sofia Jakobsson
- (Switzerland) Eseosa Aigbogun
- (Switzerland) Ana-Maria Crnogorčević
- (Switzerland) Martina Moser
- (Thailand) Thanatta Chawong
- (United States) Tobin Heath
- (United States) Lauren Holiday
- (United States) Alex Morgan
- (United States) Kelley O'Hara
- (United States) Christen Press
- (United States) Abby Wambach

1 own goal

- (England) Laura Bassett (against Japan)
- (Mexico) Jenny Ruiz (against France)
- (Nigeria) Desire Oparanozie (against Sweden)
- (United States) Julie Johnston (against Japan)

2 own goals

- (Ecuador) Angie Ponce (against Switzerland)

Source: FIFA

=== Assists ===
Lena Goeßling of Germany won the assists table with four assists.

4 assists

- (Germany) Lena Goeßling

3 assists

- (Norway) Solveig Gulbrandsen

2 assists

- (Australia) Lisa De Vanna
- (Cameroon) Gaëlle Enganamouit
- (Cameroon) Gabrielle Onguéné
- (Costa Rica) Katherine Alvarado
- (England) Fara Williams
- (France) Eugénie Le Sommer
- (Germany) Melanie Behringer
- (Germany) Simone Laudehr
- (Germany) Anja Mittag
- (Germany) Lena Petermann
- (Japan) Aya Miyama
- (Netherlands) Manon Melis
- (Nigeria) Ngozi Okobi
- (South Korea) Kang Yu-mi
- (Switzerland) Ramona Bachmann
- (Thailand) Anootsara Maijarern

1 assist

- (Australia) Laura Alleway
- (Australia) Michelle Heyman
- (Australia) Sam Kerr
- (Brazil) Andressinha
- (Cameroon) Raissa Feudjio
- (Cameroon) Claudine Meffometou
- (Canada) Christine Sinclair
- (China) Li Dongna
- (China) Tan Ruyin
- (China) Wu Haiyan
- (Colombia) Tatiana Ariza
- (Colombia) Diana Ospina
- (Colombia) Yoreli Rincón
- (Colombia) Leicy Santos
- (Costa Rica) Lixy Rodríguez
- (England) Alex Greenwood
- (England) Steph Houghton
- (England) Jodie Taylor
- (France) Laure Boulleau
- (France) Marie-Laure Delie
- (France) Amel Majri
- (France) Gaëtane Thiney
- (France) Élodie Thomis
- (Germany) Leonie Maier
- (Germany) Dzsenifer Marozsán
- (Germany) Célia Šašić
- (Germany) Bianca Schmidt
- (Ivory Coast) Christine Lohoues
- (Japan) Azusa Iwashimizu
- (Japan) Nahomi Kawasumi
- (Japan) Yuika Sugasawa
- (Mexico) Charlyn Corral
- (Mexico) Alina Garciamendez
- (Netherlands) Vivianne Miedema
- (New Zealand) Amber Hearn
- (New Zealand) Ria Percival
- (Nigeria) Desire Oparanozie
- (Norway) Emilie Haavi
- (Norway) Lene Mykjåland
- (Norway) Maria Thorisdottir
- (Norway) Elise Thorsnes
- (South Korea) Jeon Ga-eul
- (Spain) Sonia Bermúdez
- (Spain) Marta Corredera
- (Sweden) Lisa Dahlkvist
- (Sweden) Lina Nilsson
- (Sweden) Therese Sjögran
- (Switzerland) Eseosa Aigbogun
- (Switzerland) Ana-Maria Crnogorčević
- (Switzerland) Nicole Remund
- (Switzerland) Lia Wälti
- (Thailand) Rattikan Thongsombut
- (United States) Julie Johnston
- (United States) Ali Krieger
- (United States) Sydney Leroux
- (United States) Carli Lloyd
- (United States) Megan Rapinoe

Source: FIFA Technical Report

=== Tournament ranking ===
Per statistical convention in soccer, matches decided in extra time are counted as wins and losses, while matches decided by penalty shoot-outs are counted as draws.

Pos	Grp	Team	Pld	W	D	L	GF	GA	GD	Pts	Final result
1	D	United States	7	6	1	0	14	3	+11	19	Champions
2	C	Japan	7	6	0	1	11	8	+3	18	Runners-up
3	F	England	7	5	0	2	10	7	+3	15	Third place
4	B	Germany	7	3	2	2	20	6	+14	11	Fourth place
5	F	France	5	3	1	1	10	3	+7	10	Eliminated in quarter-finals
6	A	Canada (H)	5	2	2	1	4	3	+1	8	Eliminated in quarter-finals
7	D	Australia	5	2	1	2	5	5	0	7	Eliminated in quarter-finals
8	A	China	5	2	1	2	4	4	0	7	Eliminated in quarter-finals
9	E	Brazil	4	3	0	1	4	1	+3	9	Eliminated in round of 16
10	B	Norway	4	2	1	1	9	4	+5	7	Eliminated in round of 16
11	C	Cameroon	4	2	0	2	9	4	+5	6	Eliminated in round of 16
12	F	Colombia	4	1	1	2	4	5	−1	4	Eliminated in round of 16
13	A	Netherlands	4	1	1	2	3	4	−1	4	Eliminated in round of 16
14	E	South Korea	4	1	1	2	4	8	−4	4	Eliminated in round of 16
15	C	Switzerland	4	1	0	3	11	5	+6	3	Eliminated in round of 16
16	D	Sweden	4	0	3	1	5	8	−3	3	Eliminated in round of 16
17	B	Thailand	3	1	0	2	3	10	−7	3	Eliminated in group stage
18	E	Costa Rica	3	0	2	1	3	4	−1	2	Eliminated in group stage
19	A	New Zealand	3	0	2	1	2	3	−1	2	Eliminated in group stage
20	E	Spain	3	0	1	2	2	4	−2	1	Eliminated in group stage
21	D	Nigeria	3	0	1	2	3	6	−3	1	Eliminated in group stage
22	F	Mexico	3	0	1	2	2	8	−6	1	Eliminated in group stage
23	B	Ivory Coast	3	0	0	3	3	16	−13	0	Eliminated in group stage
24	C	Ecuador	3	0	0	3	1	17	−16	0	Eliminated in group stage

Source: FIFA Technical Report
(H) Hosts

== Controversies ==
All of the tournament's venues had fields composed of artificial turf, which some players believe results in a higher risk of injuries to players. More than 50 players protested the use of the surface instead of grass on the basis of gender discrimination. They filed a lawsuit challenging FIFA's decision to play on artificial turf, claiming FIFA would never allow the men's World Cup to be played on "unsafe" artificial turf and thus the organizers had violated the Canadian Human Rights Act. 2012 Women's World Player of the Year Abby Wambach noted "The men would strike playing on artificial turf." The controversial issue of gender equality and an equal playing field for all sparked debate in many countries around the world. An application filed on 1 October 2014 with the Ontario Human Rights Tribunal by a group of women's international soccer players against FIFA and the Canadian Soccer Association noted that, in 1994, FIFA spent $2 million to plant natural grass over artificial turf in New Jersey and Detroit. Some celebrities and prominent players showed their support for the women soccer players in defence of their lawsuit, including United States men's team keeper Tim Howard. Even with the possibility of boycotts, FIFA's head of women's competitions, Tatjana Haenni, made it clear "We play on artificial turf and there's no Plan B." In January 2015, the lawsuit was withdrawn by the players.

Fox commentator Julie Stewart-Binks measured the turf temperature at several games. On 21 June at the Canada vs Switzerland round of 16 game in Vancouver, she reported that her thermometer was "officially broken". Her thermometer appears to max out at 120 °F (49 °C).

During the tournament, Australian striker Michelle Heyman slammed the playing conditions, saying the turf is like "walking on hot coals" and the players feet "just turn white, your skin is all ripped off".

Prior to the start of the Australia vs Japan quarter-final in Edmonton on 27 June, Fox commentator Kyndra de St. Aubin measured the air temperature at 82 °F (28 °C) and the turf temperature at 150 °F (66 °C). Despite such dangerous conditions, officials decided against taking cooling breaks during the match because the air temperature was under 32 °C (90 °F). As the game wore on, players appeared noticeably exhausted due to the playing conditions.

Attendance was largely inflated by FIFA as single tickets were sold for double-headers during the group stages. "This allows FIFA to report the combined attendance for both matches as the attendance for each match when in reality the true attendance for one or both matches is likely to be much different."

== Broadcasting ==
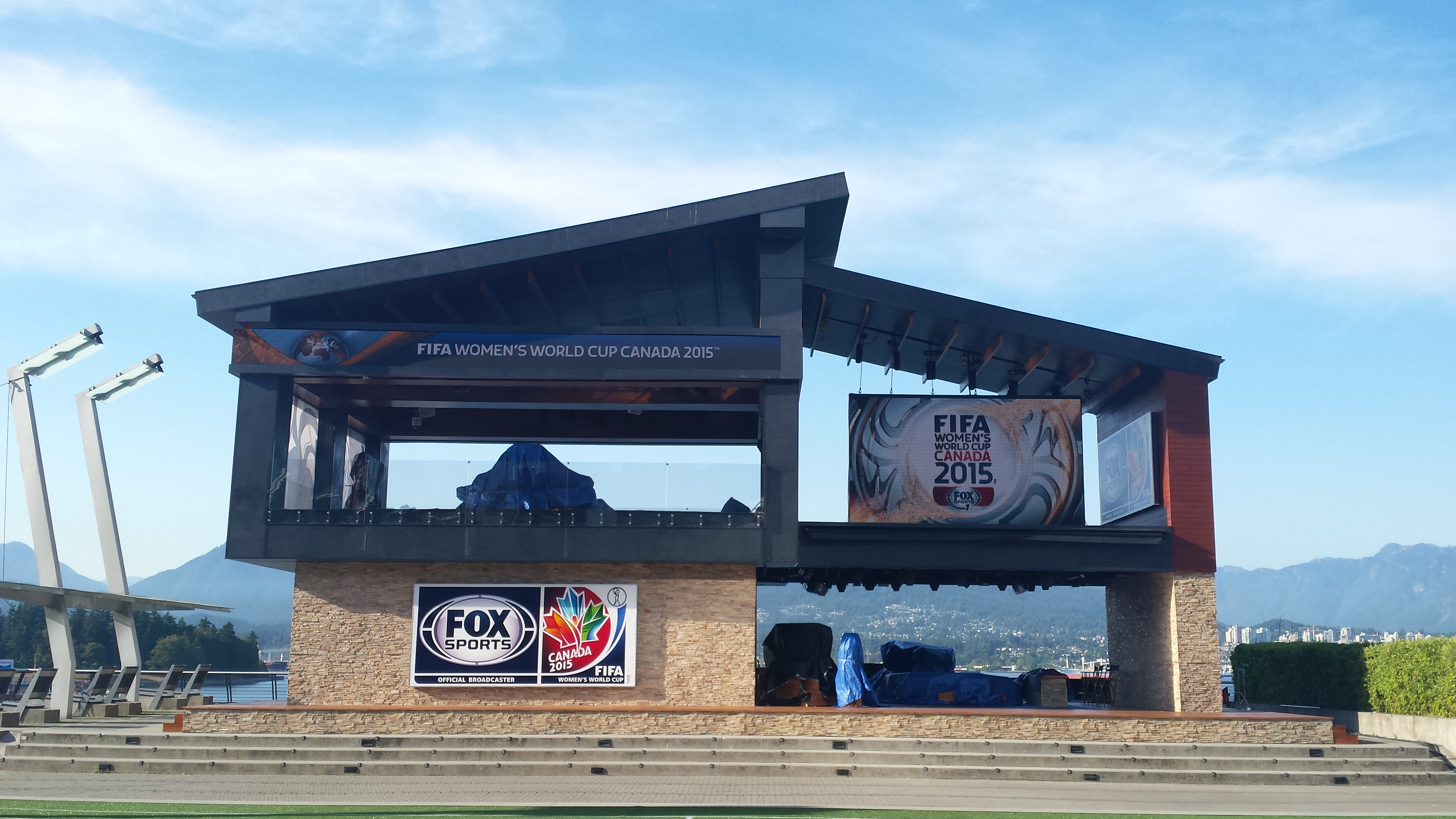
Fox Sports' studio for the Women's World Cup at Jack Poole Plaza; the tournament marked one of their first under a new rights agreement for FIFA tournaments.

The 2015 FIFA Women's World Cup was one of the first FIFA tournaments under new rights deals in two North American markets. In its host country of Canada, Bell Media acquired the broadcast rights; the competition was televised by CTV and TSN in English, as well as Réseau des sports (RDS) in French. In the United States, English-language television rights were held by Fox Sports with coverage carried on the main Fox broadcast network, along with the Fox Sports 1 and Fox Sports 2 cable channels. Spanish-language rights were held by NBC Deportes, with matches airing on Telemundo and sister cable network NBC Universo. Fox constructed a temporary studio for the Women's World Cup at Jack Poole Plaza in Vancouver, located outside the Vancouver Convention Centre.

In December 2014, the European Broadcasting Union extended its rights to FIFA tournaments for its members in 37 countries, including the 2015 Women's World Cup. In the United Kingdom, all matches from the tournament were shown by the BBC on television and streaming on the iPlayer, and all England matches aired on BBC Radio 5 Live radio. In Australia, coverage was carried by the SBS, with 41 matches airing live on SBS One, and all 52 matches (including concurrent group stage matches not on television due to scheduling conflicts) streaming on the SBS website.

== Marketing ==
=== Mascot ===
On 17 June 2014, the mascot of the tournament, Shuéme, a female great white owl, was unveiled at the Canadian Museum of Nature in Ottawa.

=== Sponsorships ===
FIFA partners	National Supporters
Adidas; Coca-Cola; Gazprom; Hyundai–Kia; Visa	Bell Canada; Labatt Brewing Company (Budweiser); Trend Micro

In the final week of the tournament, the Canadian government added Gazprom to a list of organizations sanctioned for supporting the Russian annexation of Crimea. Media suggested the addition was delayed to reduce embarrassment to FIFA.

== See also ==
- 2014 FIFA World Cup
