= Christine Lohoues =

Ivorian footballer (born 1992)

Christine Lohouès
Personal information
- Full name: Yeblé Christine Lohouès
- Date of birth: 18 October 1992 (age 34)
- Place of birth: Petit Abidjan-Youkou, Sassandra, Ivory Coast
- Height: 1.60 m (5 ft 3 in)
- Positions: Centre-back; defensive midfielder

Senior career*
Years	Team	Apps	(Gls)
- Onze Sœurs de Gagnoa
2022	Malabo Kings		
2022–????	SCC Mohammédia		

International career^{‡}
2015	Ivory Coast	24	(1)
- * Club domestic league appearances and goals ‡ National team caps and goals as of 11:49, 16 June 2015 (UTC)

Yeblé Christine Lohouès (born 18 October 1992) is an Ivorian professional footballer who plays as a centre-back or defensive midfielder. She was part of the Ivorian squad for the 2015 FIFA Women's World Cup.

== See also ==
- List of Ivory Coast women's international footballers
