= Lena Petermann =

German footballer

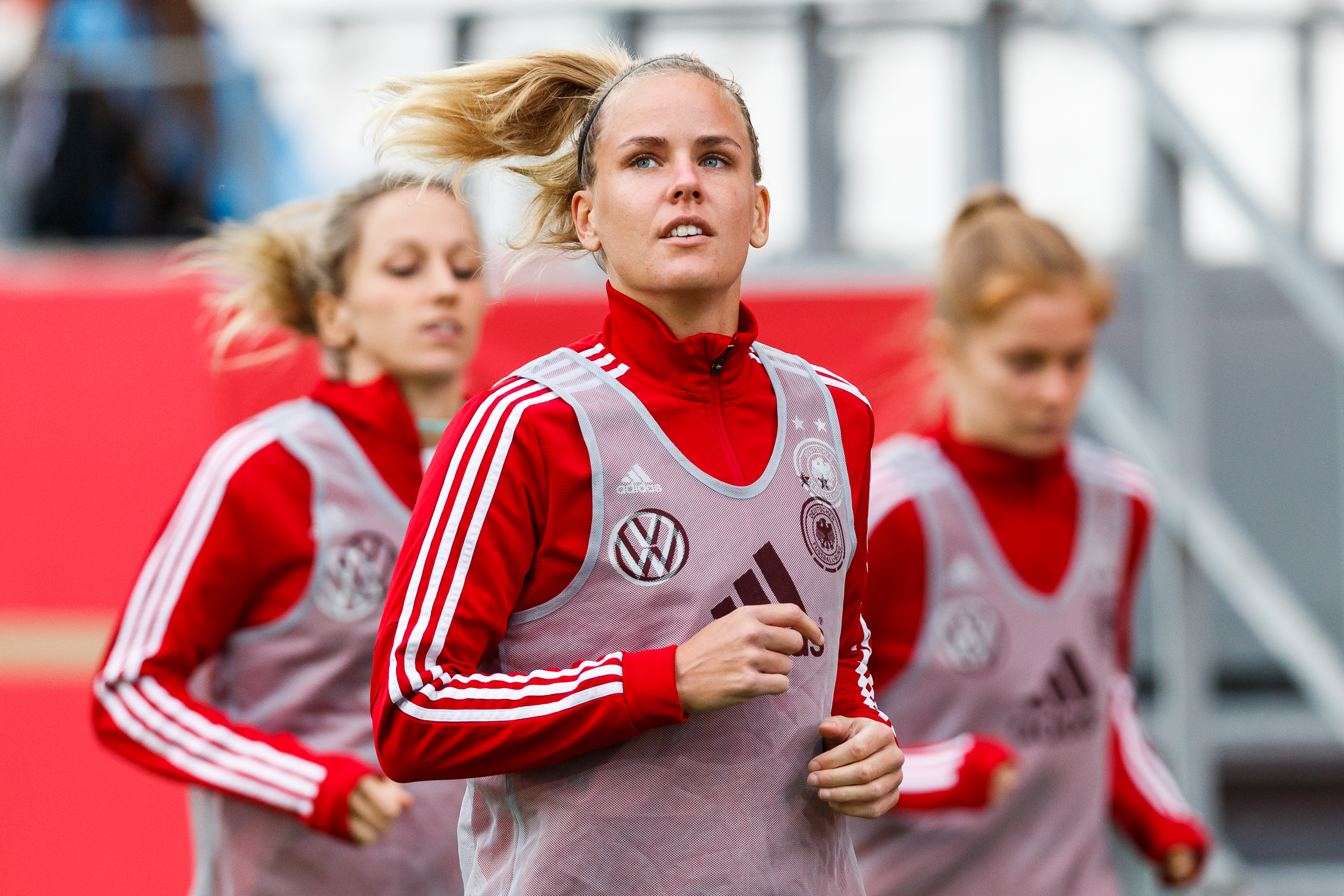
- Petermann with Germany in 2021

Personal information
- Date of birth: 5 February 1994 (age 32)
- Place of birth: Cuxhaven, Germany
- Height: 1.75 m (5 ft 9 in)
- Position: Forward

Team information
- Current team: Werder Bremen
- Number: 20

College career
Years	Team	Apps	(Gls)
2013	UCF Knights	21	(8)

Senior career*
Years	Team	Apps	(Gls)
2009–2012	Hamburger SV	31	(5)
2010	Hamburger SV II	1	(0)
2014–2018	SC Freiburg	74	(22)
2018–2019	Turbine Potsdam	10	(7)
2019–2023	Montpellier	48	(25)
2023–2025	Leicester City	20	(5)
2025–	Werder Bremen	13	(1)

International career^{‡}
2008–2009	Germany U-15	8	(8)
2010–2011	Germany U-17	8	(7)
2014	Germany U-20	10	(5)
2015–2023	Germany	22	(5)
Medal record
UEFA Women's Nations League
Bronze medal – third place	2024 France–Netherlands–Spain
- * Club domestic league appearances and goals as of 17 May 2026 ‡ National team caps and goals as of 22:09, 5 December 2023 (UTC)

Lena Petermann (German: [ˈleːna ˈpeːtɐman]; born 5 February 1994) is a German professional footballer who plays as a forward for Frauen-Bundesliga club Werder Bremen. She has appeared for the Germany national team.

== Club career ==
Petermann played at TSV Otterndorf, where she had to play in a team with boys up until the C-Youth level. This was followed by a few years in the JugendSpielgemeinschaft Otterndorf/Altenwalde/Wanna (JSG OttAWA), before she moved to SV Ahlerstedt/Ottendorf in the winter of 2009.

Petermann started her club career at Hamburger SV. On 20 September 2009, the first matchday of the 2009–10 season, she made her Bundesliga debut in a 4–1 defeat in the home game against FCR 2001 Duisburg. She scored her first Bundesliga goal on 8 November 2009 (8th matchday) in a 4–2 win in the away game against 1. FC Saarbrücken.

In 2013, she moved to the United States to play college football (soccer) for the UCF Knights in Florida, where in her first year she was named the Conference rookie of the year. At the Knights she played together with her compatriots Karoline Heinze and Sophie Howard.

After a successful campaign with Germany national U-20 team at the 2014 U-20 World Cup she had an opportunity and decided to move back to Germany to pursue a professional career, by joining SC Freiburg.

After 74 league and 13 cup games for SC Freiburg, she joined Turbine Potsdam for the 2018–19 season. After just one year, in which she scored 7 goals in 10 games, she left Turbine Potsdam and moved to France to play for Montpellier for four years.

In 2023 Petermann signed for WSL side Leicester City on a two-year contract.

== International career ==
=== Youth ===
As an under-17 international Petermann played the UEFA U-17 Championship in 2010 and in 2011, achieving third place in both. As well as the 2010 FIFA U-17 World Cup, where she scored five goals.

She played for U20 national team and was part of the winning team of the 2014 FIFA U-20 World Cup where she scored three goals. The first was in a 2–0 victory against the United States at the group stage, she scored the first goal of that match. Her second goal came during the semifinal against France, with the scores at 1–1 and France dominating the match, she scored the winning goal (2–1) in the 81st minute. Her third goal was the title winning goal during the 1–0 triumph over Nigeria, scored in the 98th minute during the match extra-time.

=== Senior ===
Petermann made her debut for the German senior team on 6 March 2015 at the Algarve Cup against China. She was part of the German squad of the 2015 World Cup in Canada, where she scored her first two senior international goals for Germany, making it 2–0 and 3–0 in the 56th and 58th minutes in the group stage 4–0 win against Thailand.

== Career statistics ==
=== International ===
As of match played 5 December 2021

Appearances and goals by national team and year
National team	Year	Apps	Goals
Germany	2015	5	2
Germany	2016	4	2
Germany	2017	5	0
Germany	2018	5	1
Germany	2020	2	0
Germany	2023	1	0
Total		22	5

Scores and results list Germany's goal tally first, score column indicates score after each Petermann goal.

List of international goals scored by Lena Petermann
No.	Date	Venue	Opponent	Score	Result	Competition
1	15 June 2015	Winnipeg, Canada	Thailand	2–0	4–0	2015 FIFA Women's World Cup
2	15 June 2015	Winnipeg, Canada	Thailand	3–0	4–0	2015 FIFA Women's World Cup
3	16 September 2016	Khimki, Russia	Russia	4–0	4–0	UEFA Women's Euro 2017 qualifying
4	22 October 2016	Regensburg, Germany	Austria	4–2	4–2	Friendly
5	10 November 2018	Osnabrück, Germany	Italy	4–2	5–2	Friendly

== Honours ==
Germany U20

- FIFA U-20 Women's World Cup: 2014

Germany

- UEFA Women's Nations League third place: 2023–24
