= Salomé di Iorio =

Argentine lawyer and football referee

- Born: 23 July 1980 (age 46); Quilmes, Argentina
- Other occupation: Lawyer

International
Years	League	Role
2004–	FIFA listed	Referee

Jessica Salomé di Iorio is an Argentine lawyer and football referee. She was selected as referee for the 2009 Copa Libertadores de Fútbol Femenino and the women's tournament at the 2012 Olympics. She served as a referee at the 2015 FIFA Women's World Cup. She is also the only woman who has refereed in the Argentine Primera División's reserves league.
