= Wang Lisi =

Chinese footballer

Wang Lisi 王丽思
Personal information
- Full name: Wang Lisi
- Date of birth: 28 November 1991 (age 34)
- Place of birth: Nanjing, Jiangsu, China
- Height: 1.62 m (5 ft 4 in)
- Position: Midfielder

Senior career*
Years	Team	Apps	(Gls)
2011–2019	Jiangsu Huatai		

International career^{‡}
2012–2015	China	53	(7)
- * Club domestic league appearances and goals as of 8 August 2015 ‡ National team caps and goals as of 8 August 2015

Wang Lisi (simplified Chinese: 王丽思; traditional Chinese: 王麗思; pinyin: Wáng Lìsī; born 28 November 1991) is a Chinese former footballer who played as a midfielder.

== International goals ==
No.	Date	Venue	Opponent	Score	Result	Competition
1.	22 November 2012	Shenzhen Stadium, Shenzhen, China	Australia	1–0	2–1	2013 EAFF Women's East Asian Cup
2.	24 July 2013	Hwaseong Stadium, Hwaseong, South Korea	South Korea	1–0	2–1	2013 EAFF Women's East Asian Cup
3.	11 June 2015	Commonwealth Stadium, Edmonton, Canada	Netherlands	1–0	1–0	2015 FIFA Women's World Cup
4.	15 June 2015	Investors Group Field, Winnipeg, Canada	New Zealand	1–1	2–2	2015 FIFA Women's World Cup
