= Gladys Lengwe =

Zambian football referee

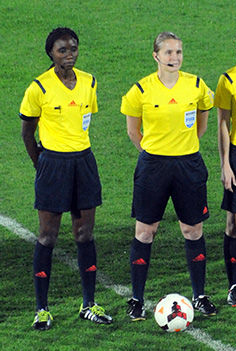
- Full name: Gladys Lengwe
- Born: 6 February 1978 (age 48); Zambia

International
Years	League	Role

Gladys Lengwe (born 6 February 1978) is an international football referee from Zambia. She was an official at the 2019 FIFA Women's World Cup in France. Lengwe has been an international referee since 2002 and made history as one of the first women in Africa to officiate top-flight men’s matches. She officiated in various FIFA tournaments, like the FIFA Women’s U-20 and U-17 World Cups.
