= Nicole Remund =

Swiss footballer (born 1989)

Personal information
- Full name: Nicole Corinne Remund
- Date of birth: 31 December 1989 (age 36)
- Place of birth: Zürich, Switzerland
- Height: 1.61 m (5 ft 3 in)
- Position: Defender

Senior career*
| Years | Team | Apps | (Gls) |
| 2004–2008 | SK Root | | |
| 2008–2011 | SC Kriens | 16 | (1) |
| 2011–2016 | Zürich | 49 | (9) |
| 2016–2025 | Luzern | 99 | (14) |

International career^{‡}
| 2008–2015 | Switzerland | 45 | (2) |
- * Club domestic league appearances and goals as of 28 November 2022 ‡ National team caps and goals as of 30 September 2015

Nicole Corinne Remund (born 31 December 1989) is a Swiss professional footballer who played as a central defender. She is a member of the Swiss national team since 2008.
