= Ange N'Guessan (footballer, born 1990) =

Ivorian footballer

Personal information
- Full name: Koko Ange Mariette Christelle N'Guessan
- Date of birth: 18 November 1990 (age 35)
- Place of birth: Abidjan, Ivory Coast
- Position: Winger

Team information
- Current team: UD Tenerife
- Number: 2

Senior career*
Years	Team	Apps	(Gls)
- Omness de Dabou
2015	Gintra Universitetas		
2015–2016	Anorthosis Famagusta	13	(17)
2016–2017	FC Barcelona	20	(3)
2017–2024	UDG Tenerife	181	(18)
2025	Al-Ula	9	(3)
2025–	UD Tenerife	13	(1)

International career^{‡}
2010-	Ivory Coast	22	(5)
- * Club domestic league appearances and goals as of 11 April 2019 ‡ National team caps and goals as of 11:40, 16 June 2024 (UTC)

Koko Ange Mariette Christelle N'Guessan (born 18 November 1990) is an Ivorian professional footballer who plays for Liga F club UD Tenerife. She was part of the Ivory Coast squad for the 2015 FIFA Women's World Cup.

N'Guessan came to notice by scoring against Norway in a 3–1 defeat at the World Cup. She joined Lithuanian club Gintra Universitetas for the 2015–16 UEFA Women's Champions League qualifying round, then finished the season in Cyprus with Anorthosis Famagusta, scoring 17 goals in 13 league games. She signed for FC Barcelona in August 2016.

== International goals ==
No.	Date	Venue	Opponent	Score	Result	Competition
1.	12 April 2026	Alassane Ouattara Stadium, Abidjan, Ivory Coast	Turks and Caicos	10–1	15–1	2026 FIFA Series

== See also ==
- List of Ivory Coast women's international footballers
