= Thanatta Chawong =

Thai international footballer

Personal information
- Full name: Thanatta Chawong
- Date of birth: 19 June 1989 (age 37)
- Place of birth: Nong Bua Lamphu, Thailand
- Height: 1.61 m (5 ft 3 1/2 in)
- Position: Forward

Senior career*
Years	Team	Apps	(Gls)
2014	Östersunds DFF	12	(3)
2019	Yunnan Jiashijing		

International career^{‡}
2014–2015	Thailand	68	(24)
- * Club domestic league appearances and goals ‡ National team caps and goals as of 22:43, 17 June 2015 (UTC)

Thanatta Chawong (Thai: ธนัสถา ชาวงษ์) is a Thai international footballer currently playing as a forward.

== Clubs ==
#	Year	Club
1.	2014–2019	Östersunds DFF
2.	2019-	Yunnan Jiashijing

== International goals ==
No.	Date	Venue	Opponent	Score	Result	Competition
1.	17 June 2005	Mỹ Đình National Stadium, Hanoi, Vietnam	Indonesia	3–0	4–0	2006 AFC Women's Asian Cup qualification
2.	22 November 2005	Marikina Sports Complex, Marikina, Philippines	Indonesia	2–1	2–1	2005 SEA Games
3.	7 December 2006	Grand Hamad Stadium, Doha, Qatar	Jordan	3–0	5–0	2006 Asian Games
4.	24 March 2008	80th Birthday Stadium, Nakhon Ratchasima, Thailand	Malaysia	4–0	11–0	2008 AFC Women's Asian Cup qualification
5.	26 March 2008	80th Birthday Stadium, Nakhon Ratchasima, Thailand	Philippines	4–0	9–0	2008 AFC Women's Asian Cup qualification
6.	26 March 2008	80th Birthday Stadium, Nakhon Ratchasima, Thailand	Philippines	9–0	9–0	2008 AFC Women's Asian Cup qualification
7.	9 July 2009	Rajamangala Stadium, Bangkok, Thailand	Iran	1–0	8–1	2010 AFC Women's Asian Cup qualification
8.	4 December 2009	National University of Laos Stadium, Vientiane, Laos	Malaysia	3–0	14–0	2009 Southeast Asian Games
9.	20 March 2011	Kaohsiung National Stadium, Kaohsiung, Taiwan	Chinese Taipei	3–0	3–0	2012 Summer Olympics qualification
10.	22 March 2011	Kaohsiung National Stadium, Kaohsiung, Taiwan	Myanmar	1–0	2–0	2012 Summer Olympics qualification
11.	25 March 2011	Kaohsiung National Stadium, Kaohsiung, Taiwan	Vietnam	1–0	1–2	2012 Summer Olympics qualification
12.	27 March 2011	Kaohsiung National Stadium, Kaohsiung, Taiwan	Hong Kong	2–0	4–0	2012 Summer Olympics qualification
13.	27 March 2011	Kaohsiung National Stadium, Kaohsiung, Taiwan	Hong Kong	3–0	4–0	2012 Summer Olympics qualification
14.	11 June 2015	TD Place Stadium, Ottawa, Canada	Ivory Coast	3–1	3–2	2015 FIFA Women's World Cup
15.	28 July 2016	Mandalarthiri Stadium, Mandalay, Myanmar	Singapore	3–0	8–0	2016 AFF Women's Championship
