= Sara Däbritz =

German footballer (born 1995)

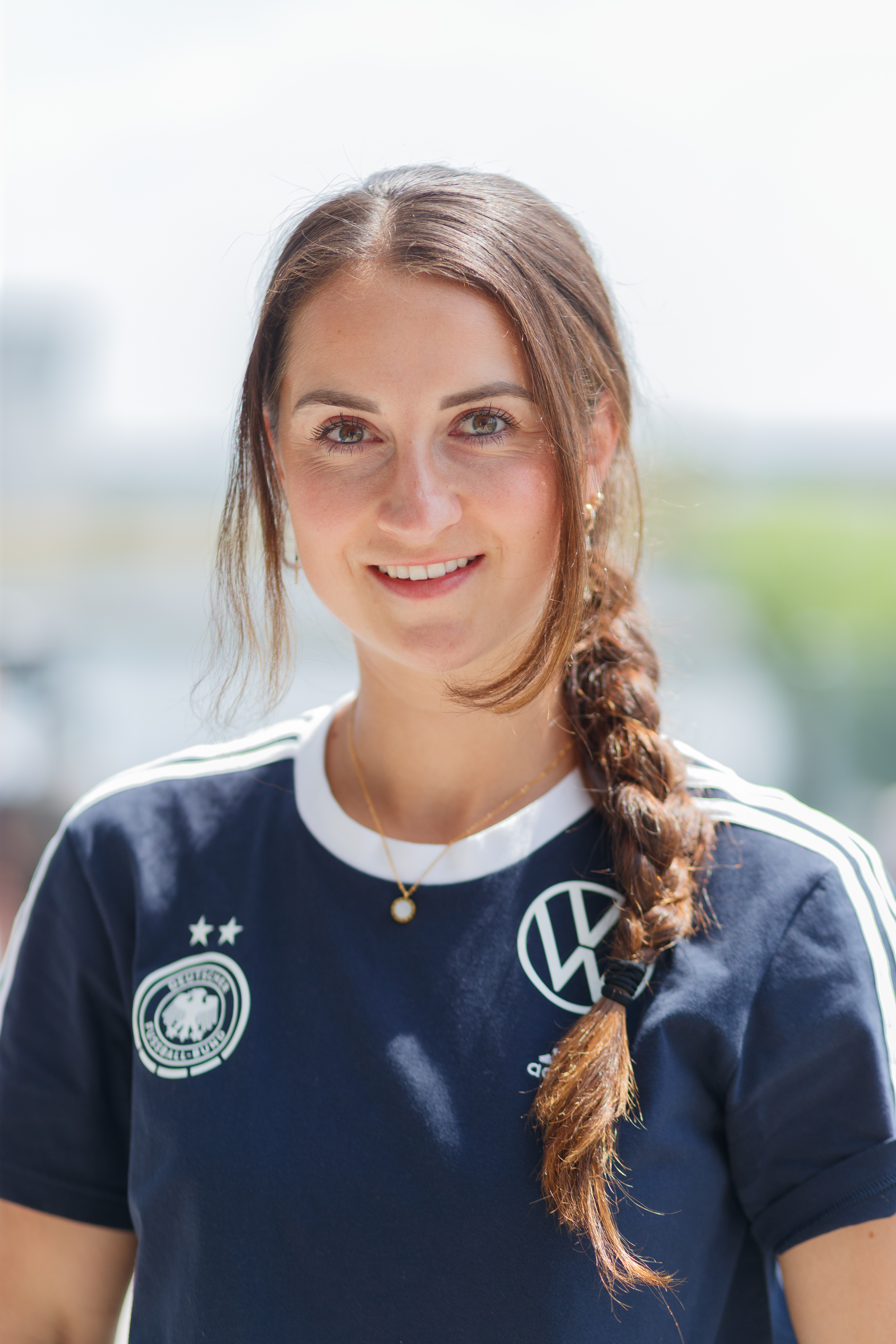
- Däbritz with Germany in 2023

Personal information
- Full name: Sara Ilonka Däbritz
- Date of birth: 15 February 1995 (age 31)
- Place of birth: Amberg, Germany
- Height: 1.71 m (5 ft 7 in)
- Position: Midfielder

Team information
- Current team: Real Madrid
- Number: 8

Youth career
- SpVgg Ebermannsdorf
- –2010: JFG Vilstal
- 2011–2012: SpVgg SV Weiden
- 2012: SC Freiburg

Senior career*
Years	Team	Apps	(Gls)
2012–2015	SC Freiburg	69	(7)
2015–2019	Bayern Munich	80	(31)
2019–2022	Paris Saint-Germain	45	(15)
2022–2025	Lyon	46	(19)
2025–	Real Madrid	31	(7)

International career
2010	Germany U15	2	(1)
2010–2012	Germany U17	18	(9)
2012–2013	Germany U19	7	(2)
2014	Germany U20	6	(5)
2013–2025	Germany	111	(18)
Medal record
Women's football
Representing Germany
Olympic Games
Gold medal – first place	2016 Rio de Janeiro	Team
UEFA Women's Championship
Gold medal – first place	2013 Sweden
Silver medal – second place	2022 England
UEFA Women's Nations League
Bronze medal – third place	2024 France–Netherlands–Spain
- * Club domestic league appearances and goals as of 21 November 2026

Sara Ilonka Däbritz (born 15 February 1995) is a German professional footballer who plays as a midfielder for Liga F club Real Madrid. She also played for the Germany national team.

== Club career ==
Däbritz began her junior career at SpVgg SV Weiden and SC Freiburg before joining the senior team of SC Freiburg in 2012. In 2015, she moved to Bayern Munich. In 2019, she agreed a move to Paris Saint-Germain. During the 2020/21 season, she appeared 18 times, scoring three goals and providing eight assists as Paris won the Division 1 Féminine title. In June 2022, she signed a contract with Olympique Lyonnais to keep her at the club until the 2025 season.

On 19 June 2025, Däbritz signed for Spanish club Real Madrid on a two-year deal until 30 June 2027.

== International career ==
On 29 June 2013, Däbritz made her debut at senior level coming in as a second-half substitute during a friendly match against Japan. She was called up to be part of the national team for the successful campaign at the UEFA Women's Euro 2013. In 2014, she was part of the Germany U-20 team at the 2014 FIFA U-20 Women's World Cup.

She was part of the squad for the 2016 Summer Olympics, where Germany won the gold medal.

At the 2019 FIFA Women's World Cup, she scored a goal in Germany's 1–0, and 4–0 wins over Spain and South Africa, earning the player of the match award on both occasions.

On 12 June 2025, Däbritz was called up to the Germany squad for the UEFA Women's Euro 2025. The squad reached the semifinals of the UEFA Women's Euro 2025, losing 1–0 after extra time to Spain in what would be her last appearance for Germany.

In October 2025, she announced her retirement from international football. She had played in every calendar year for Germany since making her senior debut in 2013.

== Career statistics ==
Appearances and goals by national team and year
National team	Year	Apps	Goals
Germany	2013	7	0
Germany	2014	4	0
Germany	2015	15	4
Germany	2016	12	4
Germany	2017	10	0
Germany	2018	10	2
Germany	2019	12	6
Germany	2020	2	0
Germany	2021	10	1
Germany	2022	11	0
Germany	2023	10	0
Germany	2024	2	1
Germany	2025	6	0
Total		111	18

Scores and results list Germany's goal tally first, score column indicates score after each Däbritz goal.

List of international goals scored by Sara Däbritz
No.	Date	Venue	Opponent	Score	Result	Competition
1	7 June 2015	Ottawa, Canada	Ivory Coast	8–0	10–0	2015 FIFA Women's World Cup
2	15 June 2015	Winnipeg, Canada	Thailand	4–0	4–0	2015 FIFA Women's World Cup
3	25 October 2015	Sandhausen, Germany	Turkey	4–0	7–0	UEFA Women's Euro 2017 qualifying
4	25 October 2015	Sandhausen, Germany	Turkey	7–0	7–0	UEFA Women's Euro 2017 qualifying
5	22 July 2016	Paderborn, Germany	Ghana	6–0	11–0	Friendly
6	3 August 2016	São Paulo, Brazil	Zimbabwe	1–0	6–1	2016 Summer Olympics
7	6 August 2016	São Paulo, Brazil	Australia	1–2	2–2	2016 Summer Olympics
8	16 August 2016	Belo Horizonte, Brazil	Canada	2–0	2–0	2016 Summer Olympics
9	10 June 2018	Hamilton, Canada	Canada	2–2	3–2	Friendly
10	10 November 2018	Osnabrück, Germany	Italy	2–0	5–2	Friendly
11	12 June 2019	Valenciennes, France	Spain	1–0	1–0	2019 FIFA Women's World Cup
12	17 June 2019	Montpellier, France	South Africa	2–0	4–0	2019 FIFA Women's World Cup
13	22 June 2019	Grenoble, France	Nigeria	2–0	3–0	2019 FIFA Women's World Cup
14	3 September 2019	Lviv, Ukraine	Ukraine	1–0	8–0	UEFA Women's Euro 2021 qualifying
15	3 September 2019	Lviv, Ukraine	Ukraine	5–0	8–0	UEFA Women's Euro 2021 qualifying
16	3 September 2019	Lviv, Ukraine	Ukraine	7–0	8–0	UEFA Women's Euro 2021 qualifying
17	26 October 2021	Essen, Germany	Israel	2–0	7–0	2023 FIFA Women's World Cup qualification
18	25 October 2024	London, England	England	4–2	4–3	Friendly

== Honours ==
Paris Saint-Germain

- Division 1 Féminine: 2020–21
- Coupe de France Féminine: 2021–22

Germany

- UEFA Women's Championship: 2013, runner-up: 2022
- UEFA Women's Nations League third place: 2023–24

Individual

- Silbernes Lorbeerblatt: 2016
