= Wales women's national football team results (2010–2019) =

- Win Draw Loss

This is a list of the 104 official and 2 unofficial Wales women's national football team results and scheduled fixtures from 2010 to 2019.

== Fixtures and results ==
=== Unofficial ===
4 March 2015 2015 Istria Cup	Wales	0–1	France B	Umag, Croatia
14:00 (CET)		Report	Makanza 38'	Stadium: Umag 4

7 April 2017 Friendly	Wales	3–1	Northern Ireland	Ystrad Mynach, Wales
11:00 (BST)	Green; Lawrence; Ladd	Report	Nelson	Stadium: CCB Centre for Sporting Excellence

=== Official ===
==== 2010 ====
24 February 2010 Friendly	Northern Ireland	0–0	Wales	Belfast, Northern Ireland
15:00 (GMT)		Report		Stadium: Windsor Park; Referee: Ross Dunlop (Northern Ireland)

28 March 2010 2011 FIFA Women's World Cup qualification (UEFA)	Belgium	2–3	Wales	Brussels, Belgium
16:00 (CEST	Philtjens 64'; Zeler 72'	Report	Dykes 19'; Daley 42' (pen.); Jones 90+1'	Stadium: Edmond Machtens Stadium; Referee: Elia María Martínez Martínez (Spain)

31 March 2010 2011 FIFA Women's World Cup qualification (UEFA)	Wales	0–4	Sweden	Broughton, Wales
19:00 (CET)		Report	Fischer 69'; Liljegärd 78'; Paulson 85'; Landström 90'	Stadium: The Airfield; Referee: Natalia Avdonchenko (Russia)

21 August 2010 2011 FIFA Women's World Cup qualification (UEFA)	Wales	15–0	Azerbaijan	Newtown, Wales
15:00 BST (UTC+01)	Lander 3', 7', 21', 36', 38', 72'; Harries 13', 56', 66'; Dutton 19'; Fishlock 59'; Ingle 65'; Green 81', 83'; Manley 90+2'	Report	44' Joël Kitenge	Stadium: Latham Park; Attendance: 395; Referee: Paloma Quintero Siles (Spain)

25 August 2010 2011 FIFA Women's World Cup qualification (UEFA)	Sweden	5–1	Wales	Växjö, Sweden
18:00 BST (UTC+01)	Schelin 12', 60'; Oqvist 45', 55', 71'	Report	81' Harries	Stadium: Värendsvallen; Attendance: 2,091; Referee: Silvia Tea Spinelli (Italy)

24 November 2010 Friendly	Wales	8–1	Bulgaria	Rhosymedre, Wales
19:00 BST (UTC+01)	Fishlock 11'; Lander 15', 51'; Ludlow 29'; Dutton 60'; Foster 60'; Harries 74'; Jones 89'	Report	63' Gergana Tznakova	Stadium: Rhosymedre Stadium; Attendance: 607; Referee: Bryn Markham-Jones (Wales)

==== 2011 ====
13 February 2011 Friendly	Wales	2–4	Scotland	Haverfordwest, Wales
12:30 (GMT)	Harries 17'; Lander 78'	Report	Ross 33' Lauder 44', 89' Love 83'	Stadium: Bridge Meadow Stadium; Referee: Dean John (Wales)

2 March 2011 2011 Algarve Cup	Portugal	3–1	Wales	Vila Real de Santo António, Portugal
18:00 (CET)	Couto 11', 61'; Fernandes 18'		Dykes 42'	Stadium: Municipal Stadium

4 March 2011 2011 Algarve Cup	Wales	2–1	Romania	Lagos, Portugal
18:00 (CET)	Fishlock 60'; Lander 72'		Dusa 40'	Stadium: Municipal Stadium

7 March 2011 2011 Algarve Cup	Chile	1–2	Wales	Faro, Portugal
18:00 (CET)	Zamora		Fishlock 24', 60'	Stadium: Estádio Algarve

9 March 2011 2011 Algarve Cup	China	2–1	Wales	Albufeira, Portugal
11:00 (CET)	You Jia 3'; Gu Yasha 54'		Harries 57'	Stadium: Municipal Stadium

20 April 2011 Friendly	Wales	5–1	Luxembourg	Aberavon, Wales
15:00 BST (UTC+01)	Lea 4', 38', 70'; Atkins 52', 90'	Report	Amy Thompson	Stadium: Lido Ground; Referee: Paul Fisher (Wales)

15 June 2011 2011 Matchworld Women's Cup	New Zealand	2–0	Wales	Savièse, Switzerland
18.00 (CEST)	Hearn 7'; Green 72'	Report		Stadium: St-Germain Stadium; Referee: Simona Ghisletta (Switzerland)

18 June 2011 2011 Matchworld Women's Cup	Wales	0–3	Denmark	Apples, Switzerland
15.30 (CEST)		Report	Troelsgaard Nielsen 3', 45', 71'	Stadium: Terrain des Planches; Attendance: 308; Referee: Yves Degaller (Switzerland)

20 June 2011 2011 Matchworld Women's Cup	Colombia	3–1	Wales	Naters, Switzerland
20:00 (CEST)	Ospina 22'; Rodallega 37', 61'	Report	Lander 40'	Stadium: Sportanlage Stapfen; Referee: Simona Ghisletta (Switzerland)

23 August 2011 Friendly	Northern Ireland	0–2	Wales	Belfast, Northern Ireland
15:00 BST (UTC+01)		Report	Lander 10', 58'	Stadium: Windsor Park; Referee: Ruthanne Wright (Northern Ireland)

17 September 2011 UEFA Women's Euro 2013 qualifying	Wales	0–2	Republic of Ireland	Newport, Wales
18:00 BST (UTC+01)		Report	D. O'Sullivan 27', 70'	Stadium: Newport Stadium; Attendance: 440; Referee: Marina Mamaeva (Russia)

22 October 2011 UEFA Women's Euro 2013 qualifying	Wales	1–4	France	Llanelli, Wales
19:00 (CEST)	Ludlow 2'	Report	Thiney 43', 74'; Le Sommer 67'; Delie 85'	Stadium: Parc y Scarlets; Attendance: 522; Referee: Anastasia Pustovoitova (Russia)

27 October 2011 UEFA Women's Euro 2013 qualifying	Scotland	2–2	Wales	Edinburgh, Scotland
19:00 BST (UTC+01)	Ross 19'; Beattie 44'	Report	Lea 4'; Lander 26'	Stadium: Tynecastle Stadium; Attendance: 1,061; Referee: Tanja Schett (Austria)

20 November 2011 UEFA Women's Euro 2013 qualifying	Israel	0–2	Wales	Ness Ziona, Israel
17:00 (IST)		Report	Lander 8'; Ingle 88'	Stadium: Ness Ziona Stadium; Attendance: 50; Referee: Caroline De Boeck (Belgium)

==== 2012 ====
29 February 2012 2012 Algarve Cup	Portugal	0–1	Wales	Parchal, Portugal
15:45 (CET)		Report	James 90+2'	Stadium: Estádio Municipal; Referee: Pernilla Larsson (Sweden)

2 March 2012 2012 Algarve Cup	Wales	0–0	Republic of Ireland	Ferreiras, Portugal
18:00 (CET)		Report		Stadium: Desportivo da Nora Park; Referee: Aissata Amegee (Togo)

5 March 2012 2012 Algarve Cup	Hungary	1–2	Wales	Santo António, Portugal
17:15 (CET)	Vágó 72'	Report	Lander 10', 50'	Stadium: Estádio Municipal; Referee: Liang Qin (China PR)

7 March 2012 2012 Algarve Cup	Wales	0–3	Norway	Loulé, Portugal
11:00 (CET)		Report	Pedersen 49', 69', 81'	Stadium: Estádio Municipal de Loulé; Referee: Jana Adámková (Czech Republic)

4 April 2012 UEFA Women's Euro 2013 qualifying	France	4–0	Wales	Caen, France
20:50 (CEST)	Thomis 9', 38', 50'; Abily 80'	Report		Stadium: Stade Michel d'Ornano; Attendance: 16,738; Referee: Pernilla Larsson (Sweden)

16 June 2012 UEFA Women's Euro 2013 qualifying	Republic of Ireland	0–1	Wales	Cork, Ireland
15:00 (IST)		Report	Lander 71'	Stadium: Turners Cross; Attendance: 653; Referee: Sofia Karagiorgi (Cyprus)

20 June 2012 UEFA Women's Euro 2013 qualifying	Wales	5–0	Israel	Wrexham, Wales
18:00 (BST)	Harding 3', 28', 36'; Wiltshire 50'; Keryakoplis 72'	Report		Stadium: Racecourse Ground; Attendance: 721; Referee: Karolina Radzik-Johan (Poland)

19 July 2012 Friendly	Wales	2–4	North Korea	Llanelli, Wales
18:00 (BST)	Fishlock 12', 70'	Report	Choe Yong Sim 22' Kim Un-hyang Ri Ye Gyong Kim Myong Gum 87'	Stadium: Stebonheath Park

5 August 2012 Friendly	Belgium	1–1	Wales	Beringen, Belgium
14:30 (CEST)	Wiard 44'	Report	James 7'	Stadium: Mijnstadion

8 August 2012 Friendly	Belgium	3–5	Wales	Verviers, Belgium
18:00 (CEST)	Zeler 22' (pen.), 88'; De Gernier 82'	Report	Lander 44' Harries 45', 53'; Keryakoplis 49' Fishlock 76'	Stadium: Bielmontstadion

15 September 2012 UEFA Women's Euro 2013 qualifying	Wales	1–2	Scotland	Llanelli, Wales
18:00 (BST)	Lander 38'	Report	Love 45'; Little 68'	Stadium: Parc y Scarlets; Attendance: 560; Referee: Jenny Palmqvist (Sweden)

25 November 2012 Friendly	Netherlands	2–0	Wales	Velsen-Zuid, Netherlands
18:00 (CEST)	Smit 38'; Spitse 90'	Report		Stadium: Sportpark Schoonenberg; Referee: Sjoukje de Jong (Netherlands)

==== 2013 ====
15 January 2013 Friendly	Greece	0–3	Wales	Glyfada, Greece
11:30 (EET)		Report	Fishlock 38', 88'; Ward 55'	Stadium: Dimotiko Stadium

6 March 2013 2013 Algarve Cup	Portugal	2–0	Wales	António, Portugal
15:30 (CET)	Fernandes 36' (pen.), 74'	Report		Stadium: Municipal Stadium; Referee: Teodora Albon (Romania)

8 March 2013 2013 Algarve Cup	Wales	1–0	Mexico	António, Portugal
18:00 (CET)	Fishlock 11'	Report		Stadium: Municipal Stadium; Referee: Liang Qin (China)

11 March 2013 2013 Algarve Cup	Wales	1–1	Hungary	Quarteira, Portugal
15:30 (CET)	Ward 5'	Report	Csiszár 76'	Stadium: Municipal Stadium; Referee: Therese Sagno (Guinea)

13 March 2013 2013 Algarve Cup	Wales	1–1 (1–3 p)	Portugal	Parchal, Portugal
15:30 (CET)	Fishlock 77'	Report	Luís 90+3'	Stadium: Stadium Bela Vista; Referee: Katalin Kulcsár (Hungary)

7 April 2013 Friendly	Scotland	2–1	Wales	Dunfermline, Scotland
13:00 (BST)	Ross 6'; Mukandi 68'	Report	Harding 12'	Stadium: East End Park; Attendance: 568; Referee: Lorraine Clarke (SFA)

17 June 2013 Friendly	Slovakia	2–2	Wales	Senec, Slovakia
13:15 (CEST)		Report	Fishlock 6'; Ward 50'	Stadium: NTC Senec

19 June 2013 Friendly	Slovakia	1–1	Wales	Senec, Slovakia
13:15 (CEST)		Report	Ward 9'	Stadium: NTC Senec

10 September 2013 Friendly	Estonia	2–3	Wales	Haapsalu, Estonia
15:30 (EEST)		Report	Lawrence 10'; Wiltshire 23', 68'	Stadium: Haapsalu linnastaadion Referee: Reelika Turi (Estonia)

26 September 2013 2015 FIFA Women's World Cup qualification	Wales	1–0	Belarus	Cardiff, Wales
19:00 (BST)	Ward 81'	Report		Stadium: Cardiff City Stadium; Attendance: 820; Referee: Eszter Urban (Hungary)

26 October 2013 2015 FIFA Women's World Cup qualification	England	2–0	Wales	London, England
19:05 (BST)	Nobbs 48'; Duggan 57'	Report		Stadium: The Den; Attendance: 5,764; Referee: Stéphanie Frappart (France)

23 November 2013 2015 FIFA Women's World Cup qualification	Montenegro	0–3	Wales	Nikšić, Montenegro
13:00 (CET)		Report	Keryakoplis 31'; Ward 70' (pen.), 79'	Stadium: Gradski stadion Attendance: 50; Referee: Florence Guillemin (France)

==== 2014 ====
7 March 2014 Friendly	Wales	1–1	Romania	Port Talbot, Wales
19:00 (GMT)	Ladd 45'	Report		Stadium: Victoria Road, Port Talbot; Referee: David Morgan (Wales)

9 March 2014 Friendly	Wales	0–0	Romania	Llanelli, Wales
15:00 (GMT)		Report		Stadium: Stebonheath Park; Referee: Richard Harrington (Wales)

4 April 2014 2015 FIFA Women's World Cup qualification	Turkey	1–5	Wales	Eskişehir, Turkey
14:00 (EEST))	Karabulut 90'	Report	Fishlock 3', 25', 37'; Wiltshire 32' (pen.); Harding 67'	Stadium: Eskişehir Atatürk Stadium; Attendance: 516; Referee: Aneliya Sinabova (Bulgaria)

9 April 2014 2015 FIFA Women's World Cup qualification	Wales	1–1	Ukraine	Llanelli, Wales
19:05 (BST)	Harding 78'	Report	Boychenko 7'	Stadium: Parc y Scarlets; Attendance: 807; Referee: Séverine Zinck (France)

8 May 2014 2015 FIFA Women's World Cup qualification	Wales	4–0	Montenegro	Bangor, Wales
19:00 (BST)	Wiltshire 12'; Fishlock 14', 23', 50'	Report		Stadium: Nantporth; Attendance: 573; Referee: Lina Lehtovaara (Finland)

14 June 2014 2015 FIFA Women's World Cup qualification	Wales	1–0	Turkey	Haverfordwest, Wales
15:00 (BST)	Wiltshire 33'	Report		Stadium: Bridge Meadow Stadium; Attendance: 890; Referee: Monika Mularczyk (Poland)

19 June 2014 2015 FIFA Women's World Cup qualification	Belarus	0–3	Wales	Minsk, Belarus
18:00 (MSK)		Report	Harding 79', 85', 90+4'	Stadium: Traktor Stadium; Attendance: 350; Referee: Linn Andersson (Sweden)

3 August 2014 Friendly	Scotland	1–1	Wales	Dumfries, Scotland
13:00 (BST)	Corsie 78'	Report	Wiltshire 58'	Stadium: Palmerston Park; Referee: Morag Pirie (Scotland)

21 August 2014 2015 FIFA Women's World Cup qualification	Wales	0–4	England	Cardiff, Wales
19:05 (BST)		Report	Carney 16'; Aluko 39'; Bassett 44'; Sanderson 45'	Stadium: Cardiff City Stadium; Attendance: 3,581; Referee: Efthalia Mitsi (Greece)

17 September 2014 2015 FIFA Women's World Cup qualification	Ukraine	1–0	Wales	Lviv, Ukraine
16:00 (EEST)	Romanenko 61'	Report		Stadium: Arena Lviv; Attendance: 673; Referee: Esther Staubli (Switzerland)

==== 2015 ====
6 March 2015 2015 Istria Cup	Bosnia and Herzegovina	0–0	Wales	Rovinjsko Selo, Croatia
11:30 (CET)		Report		Stadium: Rovinjsko Selo

9 March 2015 2015 Istria Cup	Wales	1–0	Costa Rica	Buje, Croatia
14:00 (CET)	Davies 77'	Report		Stadium: City Stadium Buje

11 March 2015 2015 Istria Cup	Croatia	1–1 (1–3 p)	Wales	Rovinjsko Selo, Croatia
14:00 (CET)	Joščak 41'	Report	James 68'	Stadium: Rovinjsko Selo
	Penalties
	Baban (penalty missed); Balog (penalty missed); Lojna (penalty scored); Šundov (penalty missed)		(penalty missed) Ward; (penalty scored) Wiltshire; (penalty scored) Hollinshead; (penalty scored) Bleazard

6 April 2015 Friendly	Wales	1–0	Slovakia	Bangor, Wales
15:00 (BST)	Ward 55'	Report		Stadium: Nantporth

8 April 2015 Friendly	Wales	1–2	Slovakia	Bangor, Wales
19:00 (BST)	Jones 30'	Report	Skorvankova; Klechova	Stadium: Nantporth

22 September 2015 UEFA Women's Euro 2017 qualifying	Austria	3–0	Wales	Sankt Pölten, Austria
18:30 (CEST)	Schiechtl 25'; Puntigam 73'; Burger 86'	Report		Stadium: NV Arena; Attendance: 1,050; Referee: Florence Guillemin (France)

23 October 2015 UEFA Women's Euro 2017 qualifying	Norway	4–0	Wales	Ålesund, Norway
17:50 (CEST)	Herlovsen 30', 71'; Ad. Hegerberg 39'; Mjelde 90+3'	Report		Stadium: Color Line Stadion; Attendance: 3,483; Referee: Bibiana Steinhaus (Germany)

26 November 2015 UEFA Women's Euro 2017 qualifying	Wales	4–0	Kazakhstan	Haverfordwest, Wales
15:00 (GMT)	Harding 48'; Ward 60', 62', 83'	Report		Stadium: Bridge Meadow Stadium; Attendance: 837; Referee: Tanja Subotič (Slovenia)

1 December 2015 UEFA Women's Euro 2017 qualifying	Israel	2–2	Wales	Ramat Gan, Israel
16:00 (IST)	Falkon 25'; Shelina 83'	Report	Harding 59', 80'	Stadium: Ramat Gan Stadium; Attendance: 120; Referee: Marta Frias Acedo (Spain)

==== 2016 ====
2 March 2016 2016 Cyprus Women's Cup	Wales	2–2	Finland	Larnaca, Cyprus
14:30 (EET)	Green 34'; Chivers 87'	Report	Engman 11'; Saari 62'	Stadium: GSZ Stadium

4 March 2016 2016 Cyprus Women's Cup	Wales	1–1	Poland	Paralimni, Cyprus
14:30 (EET)	Ward 24'	Report	Pajor 31'	Stadium: Paralimni Stadium

7 March 2016 2016 Cyprus Women's Cup	Czech Republic	1–0	Wales	Paralimni, Cyprus
14:30 (EET)	Necidová 88'	Report		Stadium: Paralimni Stadium

9 March 2016 2016 Cyprus Women's Cup	Hungary	2–1	Wales	Paralimni, Cyprus
14:30 (EET)	Csiszár 26'; Vágó 90+1'	Report	Estcourt 75'	Stadium: Paralimni Stadium

12 April 2016 UEFA Women's Euro 2017 qualifying	Kazakhstan	0–4	Wales	Shymkent, Kazakhstan
12:00 (YEKT)		Report	Green 15', 23'; Ward 60' (pen.), 81' (pen.)	Stadium: BIIK Stadium; Attendance: 545; Referee: Tania Fernandes Morais (Luxembourg)

7 June 2016 UEFA Women's Euro 2017 qualifying	Wales	0–2	Norway	Newport, Wales
17:00 (BST)		Report	Ad. Hegerberg 69', 81'	Stadium: Newport Stadium; Attendance: 703; Referee: Zuzana Kováčová (Slovakia)

19 August 2016 Friendly	Wales	0–0	Republic of Ireland	Newport, Wales
19:30 (BST)		Report		Stadium: Rodney Parade

21 August 2016 Friendly	Wales	1–2	Republic of Ireland	Ystrad Mynach, Wales
15:00 (BST)	Lawrence	Report	McCabe	Stadium: CCB Centre for Sporting Excellence

15 September 2016 UEFA Women's Euro 2017 qualifying	Wales	3–0	Israel	Newport, Wales
19:05 (BST)	Ward 16', 32'; Estcourt 59'	Report		Stadium: Rodney Parade; Attendance: 683; Referee: Eszter Urban (Hungary)

20 September 2016 UEFA Women's Euro 2017 qualifying	Wales	0–0	Austria	Newport, Wales
18:00 (BST)		Report		Stadium: Rodney Parade; Attendance: 705; Referee: Eleni Lampadariou (Greece)

==== 2017 ====
1 March 2017 2017 Cyprus Women's Cup	Hungary	0–2	Wales	Paralimni, Cyprus
17:30 (EET)		Report	Ward 34'; Estcourt 66'	Stadium: Tasos Markos Stadium

3 March 2017 2017 Cyprus Women's Cup	Wales	0–0	Czech Republic	Paralimni, Cyprus
14:30 (EET)		Report		Stadium: Tasos Markos Stadium

6 March 2017 2017 Cyprus Women's Cup	Republic of Ireland	1–0	Wales	Paralimni, Cyprus
14:30 (EET)	McCabe 20'	Report		Stadium: Tasos Markos Stadium

8 March 2017 2017 Cyprus Women's Cup	Scotland	0–0 (6–5 p)	Wales	Paralimni, Cyprus
14:30 (EET)		Report		Stadium: Tasos Markos Stadium; Referee: Eszter Urban (Hungary)
	Penalties
	J. Ross (penalty scored); Evans (penalty scored); Arnot (penalty scored); Crichton (penalty scored); Weir (penalty missed); Fi. Brown (penalty scored); Fr. Brown (penalty scored)		(penalty missed) Ladd; (penalty missed) Vine

5 April 2017 Friendly	Wales	3–1	Northern Ireland	Ystrad Mynach, Wales
16:00 (BST)	Evans 8'; Fishlock 39'; Harding 47'	Report	Furness 28' (pen.)	Stadium: CCB Centre for Sporting Excellence

8 June 2017 Friendly	Portugal	1–2	Wales	Viseu, Portugal
16:00 (CEST)	Neto (pen.)	Report	Ladd 45'; Fletcher 77'	Stadium: Estádio do Fontelo

11 June 2017 Friendly	Portugal	1–0	Wales	Mangualde, Portugal
11:00 (CEST)	Neto 68'	Report		Stadium: Estádio Municipal de Mangualde

8 July 2017 Friendly	Netherlands	5–0	Wales	Rotterdam, Netherlands
15:00 (CEST)	Martens 12' van de Donk 31'; Miedema 58', 77' van den Berg 88'	Report		Stadium: Sparta Stadion Het Kasteel

17 September 2017 2019 FIFA Women's World Cup qualification	Kazakhstan	0–1	Wales	Astana, Kazakhstan
18:00 (ALMT)		Report	Fishlock 54'	Stadium: Astana Arena; Attendance: 950; Referee: Ruzanna Petrosyan (Armenia)

24 October 2017 2019 FIFA Women's World Cup qualification	Russia	0–0	Wales	Saint Petersburg, Russia
19:00 (MSK)		Report		Stadium: Minor Sport Arena Petrovsky; Attendance: 1,931; Referee: Vesna Budimir (Croatia)

24 November 2017 2019 FIFA Women's World Cup qualification	Wales	1–0	Kazakhstan	Cardiff, Wales
19:00 (GMT)	Ladd 83'	Report		Stadium: Cardiff City Stadium; Attendance: 3,165; Referee: Simona Ghisletta (Switzerland)

28 November 2017 2019 FIFA Women's World Cup qualification	Bosnia and Herzegovina	0–1	Wales	Zenica, Bosnia and Herzegovina
13:30 (CET)		Report	Green 58'	Stadium: Bosnia and Herzegovina FA Training Centre; Attendance: 500; Referee: Galiya Echeva (Bulgaria)

==== 2018 ====
28 February 2018 Cyprus Cup	Finland	0–1	Wales	Larnaca, Cyprus
13:00 (EET)		Report	Green 56'	Stadium: Antonis Papadopoulos Stadium; Referee: Florence Guillemin (France)

2 March 2018 Cyprus Cup	Wales	0–3	Italy	Larnaca, Cyprus
13:00 (EET)		Report	Girelli 18', 44'; Adami 86'	Stadium: GSZ Stadium

5 March 2018 Cyprus Cup	Switzerland	0–0	Wales	Larnaca, Cyprus
13:00 (EET)		Report		Stadium: GSZ Stadium

7 March 2018 Cyprus Cup	Wales	1–1 (2–3 p)	Austria	Larnaca, Cyprus
13:00 (EET)	Green 86'	Report	Puntigam 13'	Stadium: AEK Arena
	Penalties
	Green (penalty scored); Lawrence (penalty scored); James (penalty missed); Griffiths (penalty missed); Ingle (penalty missed)		(penalty missed) Feiersinger; (penalty scored) Burger; (penalty scored) Klein; (penalty scored) Wenninger

6 April 2018 2019 FIFA Women's World Cup qualification (UEFA)	England	0–0	Wales	Southampton, England
19:00 (BST)		Report		Stadium: St Mary's Stadium; Attendance: 25,603; Referee: Pernilla Larsson (Sweden)

7 June 2018 2019 FIFA Women's World Cup qualification (UEFA)	Wales	1–0	Bosnia and Herzegovina	Swansea, Wales
19:00 (BST)	Green 62'			Stadium: Liberty Stadium; Attendance: 2,645; Referee: Sofia Karagiorgi (Cyprus)

12 June 2018 2019 FIFA Women's World Cup qualification (UEFA)	Wales	3–0	Russia	Newport, Wales
19:00 (BST)	Green 48', 62'; Harding 68'	Report		Stadium: Newport Stadium; Attendance: 1,214; Referee: Lina Lehtovaara (Finland)

31 August 2018 2019 FIFA Women's World Cup qualification (UEFA)	Wales	0–3	England	Newport, Wales
19:45 (BST)		Report	Duggan 57'; Scott 60'; Parris 69'	Stadium: Rodney Parade; Attendance: 5,053; Referee: Katalin Kulcsár (Hungary)

10 November 2018 Friendly	Portugal	1–0	Wales	Rio Maior, Portugal
18:00 (CET)	Costa 90'	Report		Stadium: Estadio Municipal de Rio Maior

13 November 2018 Friendly	Portugal	0–0	Wales	Rio Maior, Portugal
15:00 (CET)		Report		Stadium: Estadio Municipal de Rio Maior

==== 2019 ====
22 January 2019 Friendly	Italy	2–0	Wales	Cesena, Italy
15:15 (CET)	Mauro 15', 44'	Report		Stadium: Stadio Dino Manuzzi; Referee: Marina Višnjic (Serbia)

28 February 2019 Friendly	Wales	0–0	Republic of Ireland	Marbella, Spain
15:00 (CET)		Report		Stadium: Estadio Municipal de Marbella

5 March 2019 Friendly	Wales	0–1	Republic of Ireland	Marbella, Spain
12:00 (CET)	Quinn 64'	Report		Stadium: Estadio Municipal de Marbella

4 April 2019 Friendly	Wales	0–0	Czech Republic	Newport, Wales
19:00 (BST)		Report		Stadium: Rodney Parade; Attendance: 2168

4 June 2019 Friendly	Wales	1–0	New Zealand	Cardiff, Wales
19:00 (BST)	Green 90+1'	Report		Stadium: Cardiff International Sports Stadium; Attendance: 2011; Referee: Lizzy van der Helm (Netherlands)

29 August 2019 UEFA Women's Euro 2022 qualifying	Faroe Islands	0–6	Wales	Torshavn, Faroe Islands
18:00 (WEST)		Report	Harding 4', 58' (pen.), 79': Jones 6'; Arge 67' (o.g.); Roberts 90+3'	Stadium: Tórsvøllur; Attendance: 763; Referee: Jelena Pejković (Croatia)

3 September 2019 UEFA Women's Euro 2022 qualifying	Wales	2–2	Northern Ireland	Newport, Wales
20:05 (19:05 BST)	James 22'; K. Green 69'	Report	Magill 11'; Hutton 90+4'	Stadium: Rodney Parade; Attendance: 1,676; Referee: Ainara Andrea Acevedo Dudley (Spain)

8 October 2019 UEFA Women's Euro 2022 qualifying	Belarus	0–1	Wales	Barysaw, Belarus
19:00 FET		Report	Rowe 82'	Stadium: Borisov Arena; Attendance: 300; Referee: Tanja Subotič (Slovenia)

12 November 2019 UEFA Women's Euro 2022 qualifying	Northern Ireland	0–0	Wales	Belfast, Northern Ireland
20:45 (19:45 GMT)		Report		Stadium: Seaview; Attendance: 1,177; Referee: Karoline Wacker (Germany)
