= Colombia women's national football team results =

This page details the match results and statistics of the Colombia women's national football team from 1998 to present.

== Key ==
Key to matches

- Att.=Match attendance
- (H)=Home ground
- (A)=Away ground
- (N)=Neutral ground

Key to record by opponent

- Pld=Games played
- W=Games won
- D=Games drawn
- L=Games lost
- GF=Goals for
- GA=Goals against

== Results ==
Colombia's score is shown first in each case.

No.	Date	Venue	Opponents	Score	Competition	Colombia scorers	Ref.
1	2 March 1998	Estadio José María Minella, Mar del Plata (A)	Venezuela	4–1	1998 South American Women's Football Championship	Valencia (2), Vanegas, Grisales	
2	5 March 1998	Estadio José María Minella, Mar del Plata (A)	Brazil	1–12	1998 South American Women's Football Championship	Díaz	
3	8 March 1998	Estadio José María Minella, Mar del Plata (A)	Chile	5–1	1998 South American Women's Football Championship	Valencia (3), Grisales, Chala	
4	10 March 1998	Estadio José María Minella, Mar del Plata (A)	Peru	1–2	1998 South American Women's Football Championship	Valencia	
5	11 April 2003	Estadio Federativo Reina del Cisne, Loja (A)	Venezuela	8–0	2003 South American Women's Football Championship	Valencia (2), Imbachi, Miranda, Garzón (2), Gutiérrez, Munera	
6	13 April 2003	Estadio Federativo Reina del Cisne, Loja (A)	Ecuador	1–1	2003 South American Women's Football Championship	Valencia	
7	23 April 2003	Estadio Monumental "U", Lima (A)	Peru	1–0	2003 South American Women's Football Championship	Valencia	
8	25 April 2003	Estadio Monumental "U", Lima (A)	Argentina	2–3	2003 South American Women's Football Championship	Ordóñez, Valencia	
9	27 April 2003	Estadio Monumental "U", Lima (A)	Brazil	0–12	2003 South American Women's Football Championship		
10	13 August 2005	Estadio Hernán Ramírez Villegas, Pereira (H)	Bolivia	3–1	2005 Bolivarian Games	Ordóñez, Botero, Rodallega	
11	14 August 2005	Estadio Municipal Alpidio Mejía, La Tebaida (H)	Venezuela	2–1	2005 Bolivarian Games	Rodallega, Botero	
12	15 August 2005	Estadio Hernán Ramírez Villegas, Pereira (H)	Peru	0–2	2005 Bolivarian Games		
13	17 August 2005	Estadio Alberto Pava Londoño, Montenegro (H)	Ecuador	5–0	2005 Bolivarian Games	Caicedo, Castillo, Rodallega, Ordóñez, Obonaga	
14	19 August 2005	Estadio Alberto Pava Londoño, Montenegro (H)	Ecuador	1–0	2005 Bolivarian Games	Ordóñez	
15	20 August 2005	Estadio Hernán Ramírez Villegas, Pereira (H)	Peru	0–3	2005 Bolivarian Games		
16	12 November 2006	Estadio José María Minella, Mar del Plata (A)	Uruguay	1–0	2006 South American Women's Football Championship	Moscoso	
17	14 November 2006	Estadio José María Minella, Mar del Plata (A)	Chile	1–3	2006 South American Women's Football Championship	Gaete (o.g.)	
18	16 November 2006	Estadio José María Minella, Mar del Plata (A)	Ecuador	2–2	2006 South American Women's Football Championship	Saavedra, Molina	
19	18 November 2006	Estadio José María Minella, Mar del Plata (A)	Argentina	0–6	2006 South American Women's Football Championship		
20	16 November 2009	Estadio Olímpico Patria, Sucre (A)	Peru	3–0	2009 Bolivarian Games	Arias, Usme, Arrieta	
21	18 November 2009	Estadio Olímpico Patria, Sucre (A)	Venezuela	2–0	2009 Bolivarian Games	Ariza, Usme	
22	20 November 2009	Estadio Olímpico Patria, Sucre (A)	Ecuador	1–0	2009 Bolivarian Games	Peduzine	
23	24 November 2009	Estadio Olímpico Patria, Sucre (A)	Bolivia	4–2	2009 Bolivarian Games	Peduzine (2), Usme, Ariza	
24	13 January 2010	Estadio Municipal Francisco Sánchez Rumoroso, Coquimbo (A)	Chile	1–1	2010 Copa Bicentenario Chile	Ordóñez	
25	15 January 2010	Estadio Municipal Francisco Sánchez Rumoroso, Coquimbo (A)	Argentina	0–0	2010 Copa Bicentenario Chile		
26	19 January 2010	Estadio Municipal Francisco Sánchez Rumoroso, Coquimbo (A)	Denmark	2–2	2010 Copa Bicentenario Chile	Ordóñez (2)	
27	21 January 2010	Estadio Municipal Francisco Sánchez Rumoroso, Coquimbo (A)	Japan	2–4	2010 Copa Bicentenario Chile	Ordóñez, Vidal	
28	18 September 2010	Estadio Municipal de Cota, Bogotá (H)	Chile	2–0	Friendly	Castro, Usme	
29	20 September 2010	Sede Deportiva Federación Colombiana de Fútbol, Bogotá (H)	Chile	2–1	Friendly	Rincón, Y. Domínguez	
30	5 November 2010	Estadio Federativo Reina del Cisne, Loja (A)	Paraguay	3–0	2010 South American Women's Football Championship	Domínguez, Usme, Rincón	
31	9 November 2010	Estadio Jorge Andrade, Azogues (A)	Venezuela	5–0	2010 South American Women's Football Championship	Arias, Rodallega, Peralta, Rincón, Velásquez	
32	11 November 2010	Estadio Alejandro Serrano Aguilar, Cuenca (A)	Brazil	1–2	2010 South American Women's Football Championship	Muñoz	
33	13 November 2010	Estadio Alejandro Serrano Aguilar, Cuenca (A)	Uruguay	8–0	2010 South American Women's Football Championship	Usme, Rincón (2), Castro (2), Montoya, N. Arias, Vidal	
34	17 November 2010	Estadio La Cocha, Latacunga (A)	Chile	1–1	2010 South American Women's Football Championship	Rincón	
35	19 November 2010	Estadio La Cocha, Latacunga (A)	Brazil	0–5	2010 South American Women's Football Championship		
36	21 November 2010	Estadio Olímpico Atahualpa, Quito (A)	Argentina	1–0	2010 South American Women's Football Championship	Vidal	
37	22 April 2011	Estadio Villa Olímpica de Chía, Chía (H)	Mexico	2–3	Friendly	Usme, Rincón	
38	24 April 2011	Estadio Villa Olímpica de Chía, Chía (H)	Mexico	2–4	Friendly	Romero, Castro	
39	15 June 2011	St-Germain Stadium, Savièse (A)	Denmark	1–1 (a.e.t.) (1–3p)	2011 Matchworld Women's Cup	Dominguez	
40	18 June 2011	Terrain des Planches, Apples (A)	New Zealand	0–1	2011 Matchworld Women's Cup		
41	20 June 2011	Sportanlage Stapfen, Naters (A)	Wales	3–1	2011 Matchworld Women's Cup	Ospina, Rodallega (2)	
42	28 June 2011	BayArena, Leverkusen (A)	Sweden	0–1	2011 FIFA Women's World Cup		
43	2 July 2011	Rhein-Neckar-Arena, Sinsheim (A)	United States	0–3	2011 FIFA Women's World Cup		
44	6 July 2011	Ruhrstadion, Bochum (A)	North Korea	0–0	2011 FIFA Women's World Cup		
45	18 October 2011	Estadio Omnilife, Guadalajara (A)	Trinidad and Tobago	1–0	2011 Pan American Games	Andrade	
46	20 October 2011	Estadio Omnilife, Guadalajara (A)	Chile	1–0	2011 Pan American Games	Rincón	
47	22 October 2011	Estadio Omnilife, Guadalajara (A)	Mexico	0–1	2011 Pan American Games		
48	25 October 2011	Estadio Omnilife, Guadalajara (A)	Canada	1–2	2011 Pan American Games	Usme	
49	27 October 2011	Estadio Omnilife, Guadalajara (A)	Mexico	0–1 (a.e.t.)	2011 Pan American Games		
50	9 July 2012	Stade de Copet, Vevey (A)	Canada	0–1	Friendly		
51	14 July 2012	Stade du Lussy, Châtel-Saint-Denis (A)	Brazil	1–2	Friendly	Velásquez	
52	17 July 2012	St-Germain Stadium, Savièse (A)	New Zealand	1–2	Friendly	Salazar	
53	25 July 2012	Hampden Park, Glasgow (A)	North Korea	0–2	2012 Summer Olympics		
54	28 July 2012	Hampden Park, Glasgow (A)	United States	0–3	2012 Summer Olympics		
55	31 July 2012	St James' Park, Newcastle (A)	France	0–1	2012 Summer Olympics		
56	8 March 2014	Estadio Bicentenario de La Florida, Santiago (A)	Venezuela	0–1	2014 South American Games		
57	10 March 2014	Estadio Bicentenario de La Florida, Santiago (A)	Uruguay	2–0	2014 South American Games	Santos, Ospina	
58	12 March 2014	Estadio Bicentenario de La Florida, Santiago (A)	Brazil	1–2	2014 South American Games	Pineda	
59	13 September 2014	Estadio Bellavista, Ambato (A)	Uruguay	4–0	2014 Copa América Femenina	Andrade, N. Arias, Santos, Ospina	
60	15 September 2014	Estadio Olímpico de Riobamba, Riobamba (A)	Venezuela	4–1	2014 Copa América Femenina	Rincón, Ortiz, Velasquez, Cosme	
61	17 September 2014	Estadio Bellavista, Ambato (A)	Ecuador	1–0	2014 Copa América Femenina	Ariza	
62	19 September 2014	Estadio La Cocha, Latacunga (A)	Peru	1–0	2014 Copa América Femenina	Rincón	
63	24 September 2014	Estadio Chillogallo, Quito (A)	Argentina	0–0	2014 Copa América Femenina		
64	26 September 2014	Estadio Rumiñahui, Sangolquí (A)	Ecuador	2–1	2014 Copa América Femenina	Echeverry, Rincón	
65	28 September 2014	Estadio Olímpico Atahualpa, Quito (A)	Brazil	0–0	2014 Copa América Femenina		
66	17 November 2014	Estadio Unidad Deportiva Hugo Sánchez, Veracruz (A)	Mexico	1–1	2014 Central American and Caribbean Games	Velásquez	
67	19 November 2014	Estadio Unidad Deportiva Hugo Sánchez, Veracruz (A)	Haiti	3–0	2014 Central American and Caribbean Games	Pineda, Castro (2)	
68	21 November 2014	Estadio Unidad Deportiva Hugo Sánchez, Veracruz (A)	Trinidad and Tobago	7–0	2014 Central American and Caribbean Games	N. Arias, D. Ospina, Ollivierre (o.g.), I. Vidal, Castro (2), Y. Rincón	
69	25 November 2014	Estadio Unidad Deportiva Hugo Sánchez, Veracruz (A)	Venezuela	1–0	2014 Central American and Caribbean Games	Montoya	
70	27 November 2014	Estadio Unidad Deportiva Hugo Sánchez, Veracruz (A)	Mexico	0–2	2014 Central American and Caribbean Games		
71	17 March 2015	Estadio General Santander, Cúcuta (H)	Venezuela	3–0	Friendly	Rincón, Andrade, Cuesta	
72	19 March 2015	Estadio General Santander, Cúcuta (H)	Venezuela	3–1	Friendly	Ariza (2), Usme	
73	11 April 2015	Estadio Olímpico de Tulcán, Tulcán (A)	Ecuador	4–1	Friendly	Usme, Arias, Vidal, Clavijo	
74	15 April 2015	Estadio Departamental Libertad, Pasto (H)	Ecuador	2–1	Friendly	Vidal, Arrieta	
75	31 May 2015	Metropolitan State University of Denver Stadium, Denver (A)	Costa Rica	2–1	Friendly	Usme (2)	
76	9 June 2015	Moncton Stadium, Moncton (A)	Mexico	1–1	2015 FIFA Women's World Cup	Montoya	
77	13 June 2015	Moncton Stadium, Moncton (A)	France	2–0	2015 FIFA Women's World Cup	Andrade, Usme	
78	17 June 2015	Olympic Stadium, Montreal (A)	England	1–2	2015 FIFA Women's World Cup	Andrade	
79	22 June 2015	Commonwealth Stadium, Edmonton (A)	United States	0–2	2015 FIFA Women's World Cup		
80	11 July 2015	Hamilton Pan Am Soccer Stadium, Hamilton (A)	Mexico	1–0	2015 Pan American Games	Usme	
81	14 July 2015	Hamilton Pan Am Soccer Stadium, Hamilton (A)	Trinidad and Tobago	1–1	2015 Pan American Games	Vidal	
82	18 July 2015	Hamilton Pan Am Soccer Stadium, Hamilton (A)	Argentina	2–0	2015 Pan American Games	Arias, Usme	
83	22 July 2015	Hamilton Pan Am Soccer Stadium, Hamilton (A)	Canada	1–0	2015 Pan American Games	Ospina	
84	22 July 2015	Hamilton Pan Am Soccer Stadium, Hamilton (A)	Brazil	0–4	2015 Pan American Games		
85	6 April 2016	Pratt & Whitney Stadium at Rentschler Field, East Hartford (A)	United States	0–7	Friendly		
86	10 April 2016	Subaru Park, Chester (A)	United States	0–3	Friendly		
87	25 May 2016	Centro Nacional de Alto Rendimiento, Los Robles (A)	Venezuela	2–0	Friendly	Usme, Andrade	
88	27 May 2016	Centro Nacional de Alto Rendimiento, Los Robles (A)	Venezuela	1–0	Friendly	Usme	
89	3 August 2016	Mineirão, Belo Horizonte (A)	France	0–4	2016 Summer Olympics		
90	6 August 2016	Mineirão, Belo Horizonte (A)	New Zealand	0–1	2016 Summer Olympics		
91	9 August 2016	Mineirão, Belo Horizonte (A)	United States	2–2	2016 Summer Olympics	Usme (2)	
92	23 November 2017	Estadio General Santander, Cúcuta (H)	Venezuela	2–0	Friendly	Usme (2)	
93	27 November 2017	Estadio Polideportivo de Pueblo Nuevo, San Cristóbal (A)	Venezuela	1–0	Friendly	Arias	
94	19 January 2018	Century Lotus Stadium, Foshan (A)	Thailand	1–1	2018 Four Nations Tournament	Caro	
95	21 January 2018	Century Lotus Stadium, Foshan (A)	Vietnam	2–0	2018 Four Nations Tournament	González, Usme	
96	23 January 2018	Century Lotus Stadium, Foshan (A)	China	0–2	2018 Four Nations Tournament		
97	6 March 2018	Estadio San Carlos de Apoquindo, Santiago (A)	Chile	0–0	Friendly		
98	4 April 2018	Estadio La Portada, La Serena (A)	Uruguay	7–0	2018 Copa América Femenina	Usme (4), Montoya, Rincón, Echeverri	
99	6 April 2018	Estadio La Portada, La Serena (A)	Chile	1–1	2018 Copa América Femenina	Usme	
100	8 April 2018	Estadio La Portada, La Serena (A)	Paraguay	5–1	2018 Copa América Femenina	Usme (3), Ospina, Santos	
101	10 April 2018	Estadio La Portada, La Serena (A)	Peru	3–0	2018 Copa América Femenina	Usme, Santos, Echeverri	
102	16 April 2018	Estadio La Portada, La Serena (A)	Argentina	1–3	2018 Copa América Femenina	Salazar	
103	19 April 2018	Estadio La Portada, La Serena (A)	Chile	0–0	2018 Copa América Femenina		
104	22 April 2018	Estadio La Portada, La Serena (A)	Brazil	0–3	2018 Copa América Femenina		
105	19 July 2018	Estadio Moderno Julio Torres, Barranquilla (H)	Costa Rica	0–1	2018 Central American and Caribbean Games		
106	21 July 2018	Estadio Moderno Julio Torres, Barranquilla (H)	Venezuela	3–2	2018 Central American and Caribbean Games	Usme, Vanegas, Restrepo	
107	23 July 2018	Estadio Moderno Julio Torres, Barranquilla (H)	Jamaica	1–2	2018 Central American and Caribbean Games	Echeverri	
108	4 April 2019	Villa Deportiva Nacional, Lima (A)	Peru	2–1	Friendly	Echeverry, Cuesta	
109	7 April 2019	Estadio Universidad San Marcos, Lima (A)	Peru	4–0	Friendly	M. Ramírez, Cuesta, M. González, Vega (o.g.)	
110	16 May 2019	Centro Deportivo Azul, Santiago (A)	Chile	2–0	Friendly	M. Ramírez, Restrepo	
111	19 May 2019	Estadio Nacional Julio Martínez Prádanos, Santiago (A)	Chile	1–1	Friendly	Restrepo	
112	28 July 2019	Estadio Universidad San Marcos, Lima (A)	Paraguay	0–0	2019 Pan American Games		
113	31 July 2019	Estadio Universidad San Marcos, Lima (A)	Jamaica	2–0	2019 Pan American Games	Santos (2)	
114	3 August 2019	Estadio Universidad San Marcos, Lima (A)	Mexico	2–2	2019 Pan American Games	Echeverri, Vanegas	
115	6 August 2019	Estadio Universidad San Marcos, Lima (A)	Costa Rica	4–3 (a.e.t.)	2019 Pan American Games	Santos, Gaitán, Ospina, Usme	
116	9 August 2019	Estadio Universidad San Marcos, Lima (A)	Argentina	1–1 (a.e.t.) (7–6p)	2019 Pan American Games	Usme	
117	9 November 2019	River Camp, Buenos Aires (A)	Argentina	0–1	Friendly		
118	12 November 2019	Centro de Entrenamiento de Ezeiza, Buenos Aires (A)	Argentina	2–2	Friendly	Paví, S. Martínez	
119	18 January 2021	Inter&Co Stadium, Orlando (A)	United States	0–4	Friendly		
120	22 January 2021	Inter&Co Stadium, Orlando (A)	United States	0–6	Friendly		
121	10 April 2021	Estadio Rodrigo Paz Delgado, Quito (A)	Ecuador	1–0	Friendly	Usme	
122	13 April 2021	Estadio Rodrigo Paz Delgado, Quito (A)	Ecuador	4–0	Friendly	Usme (4)	
123	21 September 2021	Estadio Azteca, Mexico City (A)	Mexico	0–2	Friendly		
124	23 October 2021	Estadio Olímpico Pascual Guerrero, Cali (H)	Chile	2–0	Friendly	Caicedo, Vanegas	
125	28 November 2021	Estadio Deportivo Cali, Palmira (H)	Uruguay	3–2	Friendly	Usme (2), Santos	
126	30 November 2021	Estadio Deportivo Cali, Palmira (H)	Uruguay	1–0	Friendly	Vanegas	
127	20 February 2022	Estadio Olímpico Pascual Guerrero, Cali (H)	Argentina	2–2	Friendly	Usme, M. Ramírez	
128	23 February 2022	Estadio Américo Montanini, Bucaramanga (H)	Argentina	0–0	Friendly		
129	9 April 2022	Estadio Olímpico Pascual Guerrero, Cali (H)	Venezuela	2–2	Friendly	Santos	
130	12 April 2022	Estadio Olímpico Pascual Guerrero, Cali (H)	Venezuela	0–0	Friendly		
131	25 June 2022	Dick's Sporting Goods Park, Commerce City (A)	United States	0–3	Friendly		
132	28 June 2022	America First Field, Sandy (A)	United States	0–2	Friendly		
133	8 July 2022	Estadio Olímpico Pascual Guerrero, Cali (H)	Paraguay	4–2	2022 Copa América Femenina	Montoya (2), Ramírez, Vanegas	
134	11 July 2022	Estadio Olímpico Pascual Guerrero, Cali (H)	Bolivia	3–0	2022 Copa América Femenina	Santos, Morales (o.g.), D. Arias	
135	17 July 2022	Estadio Olímpico Pascual Guerrero, Cali (H)	Ecuador	2–1	2022 Copa América Femenina	Ramírez, Caicedo	
136	20 July 2022	Estadio Centenario, Armenia (H)	Chile	4–0	2022 Copa América Femenina	Usme, D. Arias, Vanegas, Salazar	
137	25 July 2022	Estadio Américo Montanini, Bucaramanga (H)	Argentina	1–0	2022 Copa América Femenina	Caicedo	
138	30 July 2022	Estadio Américo Montanini, Bucaramanga (H)	Brazil	0–1	2022 Copa América Femenina		
139	3 September 2022	Estadio Deportivo Cali, Palmira (H)	Costa Rica	1–0	Friendly	Usme	
140	6 September 2022	Estadio Olímpico Pascual Guerrero, Cali (H)	Costa Rica	2–0	Friendly	Usme, Caicedo	
141	8 October 2022	Estadio Deportivo Cali, Palmira (H)	Paraguay	1–0	Friendly	Chacón	
142	11 October 2022	Estadio Olímpico Pascual Guerrero, Cali (H)	Paraguay	4–0	Friendly	Chacón, Vanegas, Santos (2)	
143	12 November 2022	Estadio Olímpico Pascual Guerrero, Cali (H)	Zambia	1–0	Friendly	M. Ramírez	
144	15 November 2022	Estadio Olímpico Pascual Guerrero, Cali (H)	Zambia	1–0	Friendly	M. Ramírez	
145	15 February 2023	Estadio León, León (A)	Costa Rica	1–1	2023 Women's Revelations Cup	Rodríguez (o.g.)	
146	18 February 2023	Estadio León, León (A)	Nigeria	1–0	2023 Women's Revelations Cup	Caicedo	
147	21 February 2023	Estadio León, León (A)	Mexico	1–1	2023 Women's Revelations Cup	Usme	
148	7 April 2023	Stade Gabriel-Montpied, Clermont-Ferrand (A)	France	2–5	Friendly	Arias, Usme	
149	11 April 2023	Stadio Tre Fontane, Rome (A)	Italy	1–2	Friendly	Usme	
150	17 June 2023	Estadio Rommel Fernández, Panama City (A)	Panama	2–0	Friendly	Usme, Montoya	
151	21 June 2023	Estadio Olímpico Pascual Guerrero, Cali (H)	Panama	1–1	Friendly	Usme	
152	25 July 2023	Sydney Football Stadium, Sydney (A)	South Korea	2–0	2023 FIFA Women's World Cup	Usme, Caicedo	
153	30 July 2023	Sydney Football Stadium, Sydney (A)	Germany	2–1	2023 FIFA Women's World Cup	Caicedo, Vanegas	
154	3 August 2023	Perth Rectangular Stadium, Perth (A)	Morocco	0–1	2023 FIFA Women's World Cup		
155	8 August 2023	Melbourne Rectangular Stadium, Melbourne (A)	Jamaica	1–0	2023 FIFA Women's World Cup	Usme	
156	12 August 2023	Stadium Australia, Sydney (A)	England	1–2	2023 FIFA Women's World Cup	Santos	
157	26 October 2023	America First Field, Sandy (A)	United States	0–0	Friendly		
158	29 October 2023	Snapdragon Stadium, San Diego (A)	United States	0–3	Friendly		
159	2 December 2023	Estadio El Campín, Bogotá (H)	New Zealand	0–0	Friendly		
160	5 December 2023	Estadio Metropolitano de Techo, Bogotá (H)	New Zealand	1–0	Friendly	Montoya	
161	21 February 2024	Snapdragon Stadium, San Diego (A)	Panama	6–0	2024 CONCACAF W Gold Cup	Paví (2), Usme, Vanegas, Caicedo, Baltrip-Reyes	
162	24 February 2024	Snapdragon Stadium, San Diego (A)	Brazil	0–1	2024 CONCACAF W Gold Cup		
163	27 February 2024	Snapdragon Stadium, San Diego (A)	Puerto Rico	2–0	2024 CONCACAF W Gold Cup	Usme, Caicedo	
164	3 March 2024	BMO Stadium, Los Angeles (A)	United States	0–3	2024 CONCACAF W Gold Cup		
165	6 April 2024	Inter&Co Stadium, Orlando (A)	Mexico	1–0	Friendly	Usme	
166	9 April 2024	Hinchliffe Stadium, Paterson (A)	Guatemala	3–0	Friendly	Bonilla, Ramírez, Usme	
167	30 May 2024	Estadio Metropolitano de Cabudare, Cabudare (A)	Venezuela	2–0	Friendly	Caicedo (2)	
168	2 June 2024	Estadio Metropolitano de Cabudare, Cabudare (A)	Venezuela	3–0	Friendly	Usme, Pavi, Andrade	
169	13 July 2024	Estadio Jaime Morón León, Cartagena (H)	Ecuador	1–2	Friendly	Montoya	
170	25 July 2024	Stade de Lyon, Décines-Charpieu (A)	France	2–3	2024 Summer Olympics	Usme, Paví	
171	28 July 2024	Stade de Lyon, Décines-Charpieu (A)	New Zealand	2–0	2024 Summer Olympics	Restrepo, Santos	
172	31 July 2024	Stade de Nice, Décines-Charpieu (A)	Canada	0–1	2024 Summer Olympics		
173	3 August 2024	Stade de Lyon, Décines-Charpieu (A)	Spain	2–2 (a.e.t.) (2–4p)	2024 Summer Olympics	Ramírez, Santos	
174	26 October 2024	Estádio Kléber Andrade, Cariacica (A)	Brazil	1–1	Friendly	Usme	
175	29 October 2024	Estádio Kléber Andrade, Cariacica (A)	Brazil	1–3	Friendly	Caicedo	
176	30 November 2024	Beyond Bancard Field, Davie (A)	Argentina	1–1 (4–5p)	Friendly	Usme	
177	20 February 2025	Shell Energy Stadium, Houston (A)	United States	0–2	2025 SheBelieves Cup		
178	23 February 2025	State Farm Stadium, Glendale (A)	Japan	1–4	2025 SheBelieves Cup	Caicedo	
179	26 February 2025	Snapdragon Stadium, San Diego (A)	Australia	2–1	2025 SheBelieves Cup	Bonilla, Usme	
180	6 April 2025	Yodoko Sakura Stadium, Osaka (A)	Japan	1–1	Friendly	Torres	
181	8 April 2025	Sakai National Training Center Stadium, Sakai (A)	Japan	1–6	Friendly	Caracas	
182	30 May 2025	Incheon Namdong Asiad Rugby Field, Incheon (A)	South Korea	1–0	Friendly	Usme	
183	2 June 2025	Yongin Mireu Stadium, Yongin (A)	South Korea	1–1	Friendly	Jin-hui (o.g.)	
184	27 June 2025	Estadio Olímpico Benito Juárez, Ciudad Juárez (A)	Mexico	0–0	Friendly		
185	2 July 2025	Estadio Agustín "Coruco" Díaz, Zacatepec (A)	Mexico	1–0	Friendly		
186	16 July 2025	Estadio Gonzalo Pozo Ripalda, Quito (A)	Venezuela	0–0	2025 Copa América Femenina		
187	19 July 2025	Estadio Gonzalo Pozo Ripalda, Quito (H)	Paraguay	4–1	2025 Copa América Femenina	Caicedo (2), Ramírez, Santos	
188	22 July 2025	Estadio Gonzalo Pozo Ripalda, Quito (H)	Bolivia	8–0	2025 Copa América Femenina	Montoya (2), Ramírez, A. Flores (o.g.), Caicedo, Bonilla, Carabalí, Loboa	
189	25 July 2025	Estadio Banco Guayaquil, Quito (A)	Brazil	0–0	2025 Copa América Femenina		
190	28 July 2025	Estadio Rodrigo Paz Delgado, Quito (A)	Argentina	0–0 (5–4p)	2025 Copa América Femenina		
191	2 August 2025	Estadio Rodrigo Paz Delgado, Quito (H)	Brazil	4–4 (a.e.t.) (5–4p)	2025 Copa América Femenina	Caicedo, Tarciane (o.g.), Ramírez, Santos	
192	24 October 2025	Estadio Atanasio Girardot, Medellín (H)	Peru	4–1	2025–26 CONMEBOL Liga de Naciones Femenina	Santos (2), Montoya, Chacón	
193	28 October 2025	Estadio Rodrigo Paz Delgado, Quito (A)	Ecuador	2–1	2025–26 CONMEBOL Liga de Naciones Femenina	Santos, Montoya	
194	28 November 2025	Estadio Municipal de El Alto, El Alto (A)	Bolivia	1–1	2025–26 CONMEBOL Liga de Naciones Femenina	Rodríguez	
195	1 March 2026	Geodis Park, Nashville (A)	Canada	1–4	2026 SheBelieves Cup	Santos	
196	4 March 2026	ScottsMiracle-Gro Field, Columbus (A)	Argentina	1–0	2026 SheBelieves Cup	Caicedo	
197	7 March 2026	Sports Illustrated Stadium, Harrison (A)	United States	0–1	2026 SheBelieves Cup		
198	10 April 2026	Estadio Olímpico Pascual Guerrero, Cali (H)	Venezuela	2–1	2025–26 CONMEBOL Liga de Naciones Femenina	Santos, Robledo	
199	14 April 2026	Estadio Olímpico Pascual Guerrero, Cali (H)	Chile	2–0	2025–26 CONMEBOL Liga de Naciones Femenina	Caicedo, Vanegas	
200	18 April 2026	Estadio Ciudad de Lanús, Lanús (A)	Argentina	0–0	2025–26 CONMEBOL Liga de Naciones Femenina		
201	5 June 2026	Estadio Olímpico Pascual Guerrero, Cali (H)	Uruguay	1–0	2025–26 CONMEBOL Women's Nations League	Robledo	
202	9 June 2026	Estadio Defensores del Chaco, Asunción (A)	Paraguay	4–3	2025–26 CONMEBOL Women's Nations League	Guzmán (2), Restrepo, Caicedo	
203	29 July 2026	Estadio Olímpico, La Vega (N)	Jamaica	5–0	Football at the 2026 Central American and Caribbean Games	Ibargüen (2), Garavito, González, Baldovino	
204	31 July 2025	Estadio Complejo Deportivo Moca 86, Moca (N)	Mexico	0–1	Football at the 2026 Central American and Caribbean Games		
205	2 August 2026	Estadio Cibao FC, Santiago de los Caballeros (N)	Puerto Rico	3–0	Football at the 2026 Central American and Caribbean Games	Guerra, Viáfara, Carvajal	
206	4 August 2026	Estadio Complejo Deportivo Moca 86, Moca (N)	Venezuela	2–2 (a.e.t.) (4–3p)	Football at the 2026 Central American and Caribbean Games	Aponzá, Zamorano	
207	6 August 2026	Estadio Cibao FC, Santiago de los Caballeros (N)	Mexico	1–1 (a.e.t.) (2–4p)	Football at the 2026 Central American and Caribbean Games	Guerra	
208	10 October 2026	Centro Nacional de Alto Rendimiento, Maneiro (A)	Venezuela	1–0	Friendly	Guerra	
209	13 October 2026	Centro Nacional de Alto Rendimiento, Maneiro (A)	Venezuela	2–1	Friendly	Vanegas, Rodríguez	
210	28 November 2026	GIO Stadium, Canberra (A)	Australia		Friendly		
211	2 December 2026	GMHBA Stadium, Geelong (A)	Australia		Friendly		
