= Football at the 2015 Pan American Games – Women's tournament =

Football – Women's tournament at the 2015 Pan American Games
- Venue: Hamilton Pan Am Soccer Stadium
- Dates: July 11 – July 25
- Competitors: 144 from 8 nations

Medalists
Gold medal	Brazil
Silver medal	Colombia
Bronze medal	Mexico

The women's football tournament at the 2015 Pan American Games in Toronto, Canada was held at the Hamilton Pan Am Soccer Stadium in Hamilton from July 11 to 25.

For the football competition in these Games, the women competed in an eight-team tournament. The teams were grouped into two pools of four teams each for a round-robin preliminary round. The top two teams in each group advanced to a single elimination bracket. The women's competition was an open-age competition with no age restrictions.

Canada were the defending champions from the 2011 Pan American Games in Guadalajara. The gold medal was won by Brazil.

== Qualification ==
A total of eight women's teams qualified to compete at the games. Hosts Canada and Mexico qualified automatically. The winners of the regional Caribbean and Central American championships also qualified. The top four teams at the South American Championships also qualified.

=== Summary ===
Event	Date	Location	Vacancies	Qualified
Host Nation	—N/a	—N/a	1	Canada
Qualified automatically	—N/a	—N/a	1	Mexico
Central American Qualifier	May 20–26, 2014	Guatemala	1	Costa Rica
Caribbean Qualifier	August 19–26, 2014	Trinidad and Tobago	1	Trinidad and Tobago
South American Qualifier	September 11–28, 2014	Ecuador	4	Brazil; Colombia; Ecuador; Argentina
Total			8	

=== Qualified teams ===
The following eight teams qualified for the final tournament.

Team	Appearance	Previous best performance
Canada (hosts)	5th	Gold medal (2011)
Mexico	5th	Silver medal (1999)
Costa Rica	4th	Bronze medal (1999)
Trinidad and Tobago	3rd	Fifth place (1999)
Brazil	4th	Gold medal (2003, 2007)
Colombia	2nd	Fourth place (2011)
Ecuador	2nd	Seventh place (2011)
Argentina	4th	Fourth place (2011)

== Medalists ==
Event	Gold	Silver	Bronze
Women's tournament	Brazil	Colombia	Mexico

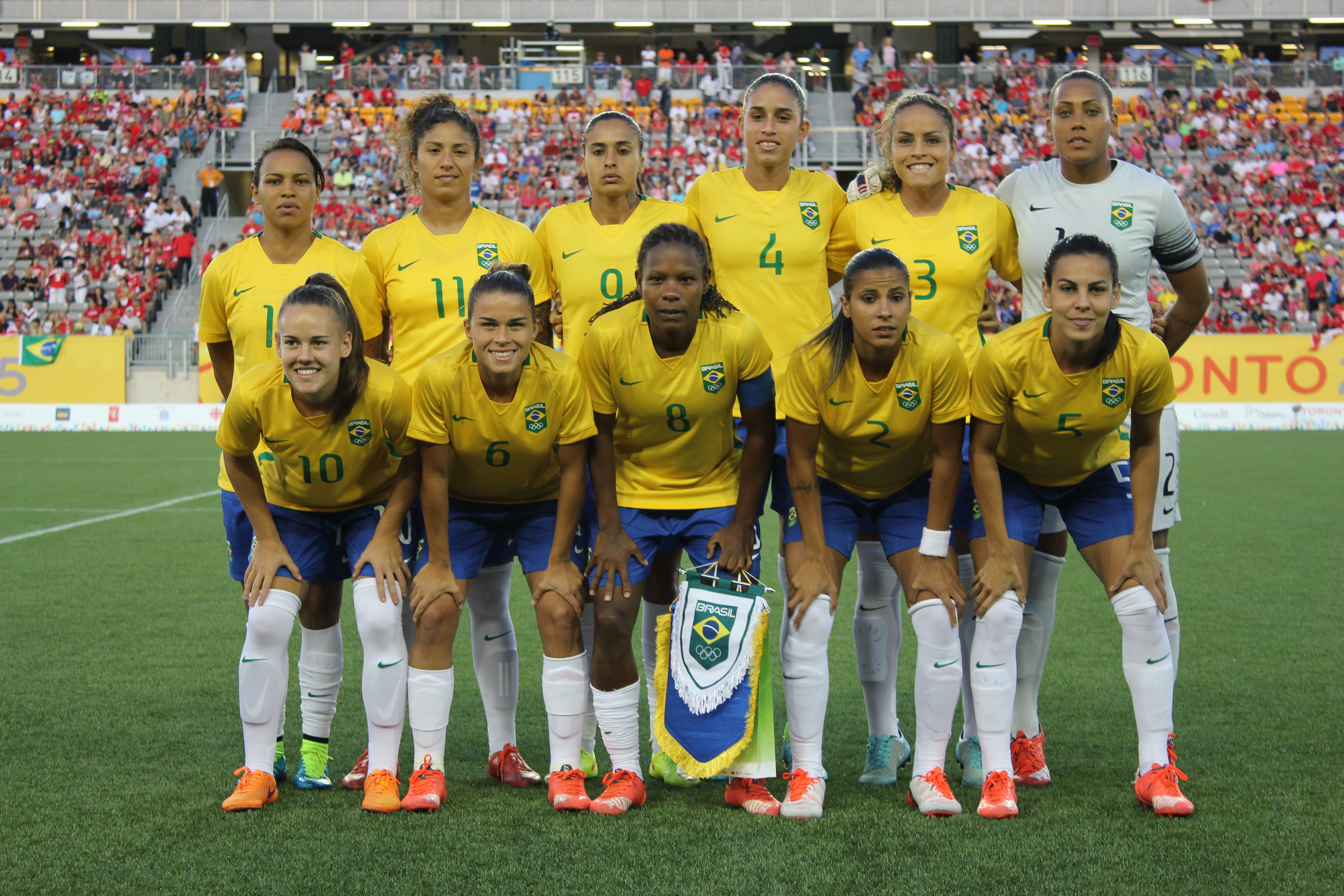
Brazil 2015

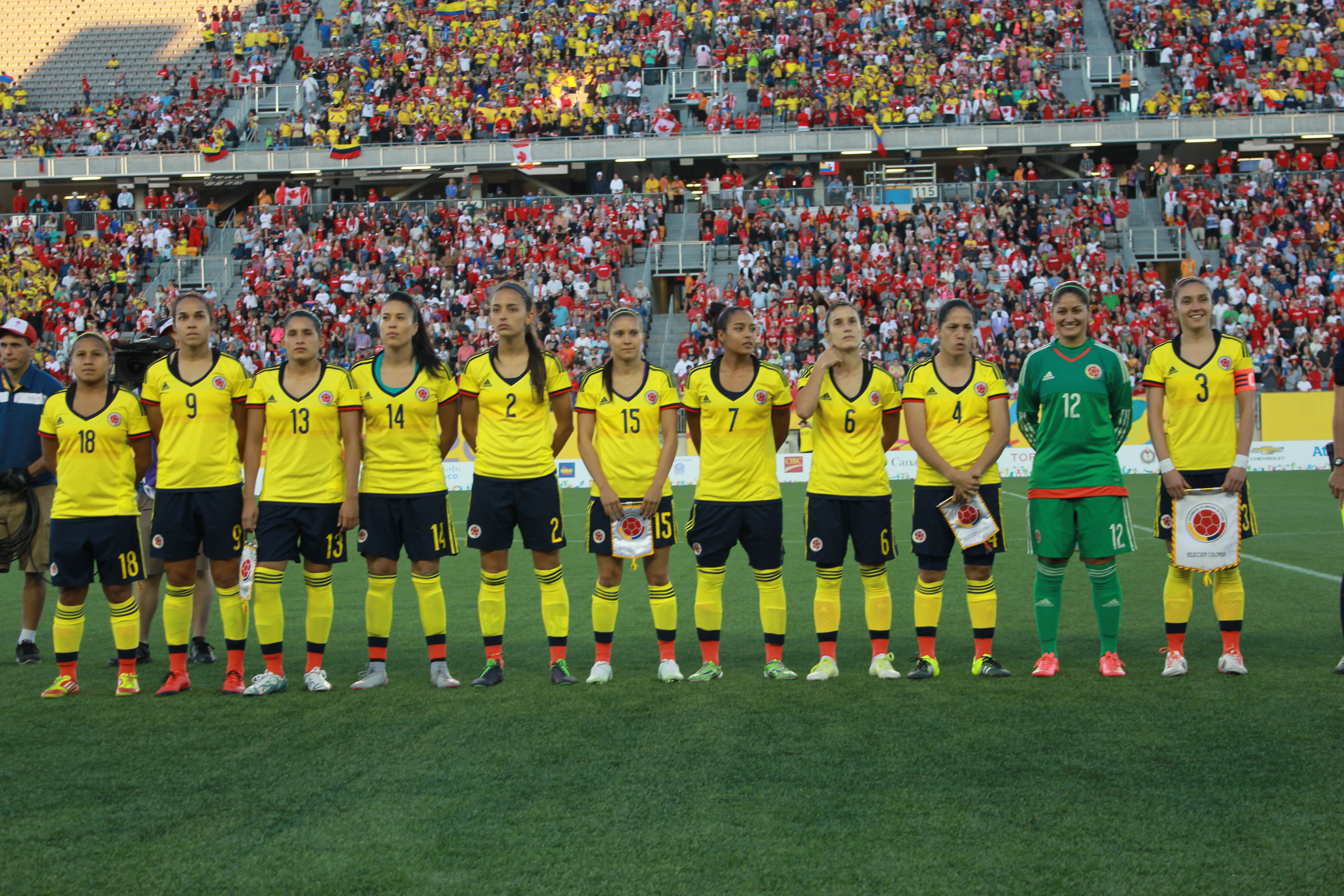
Colombia 2015

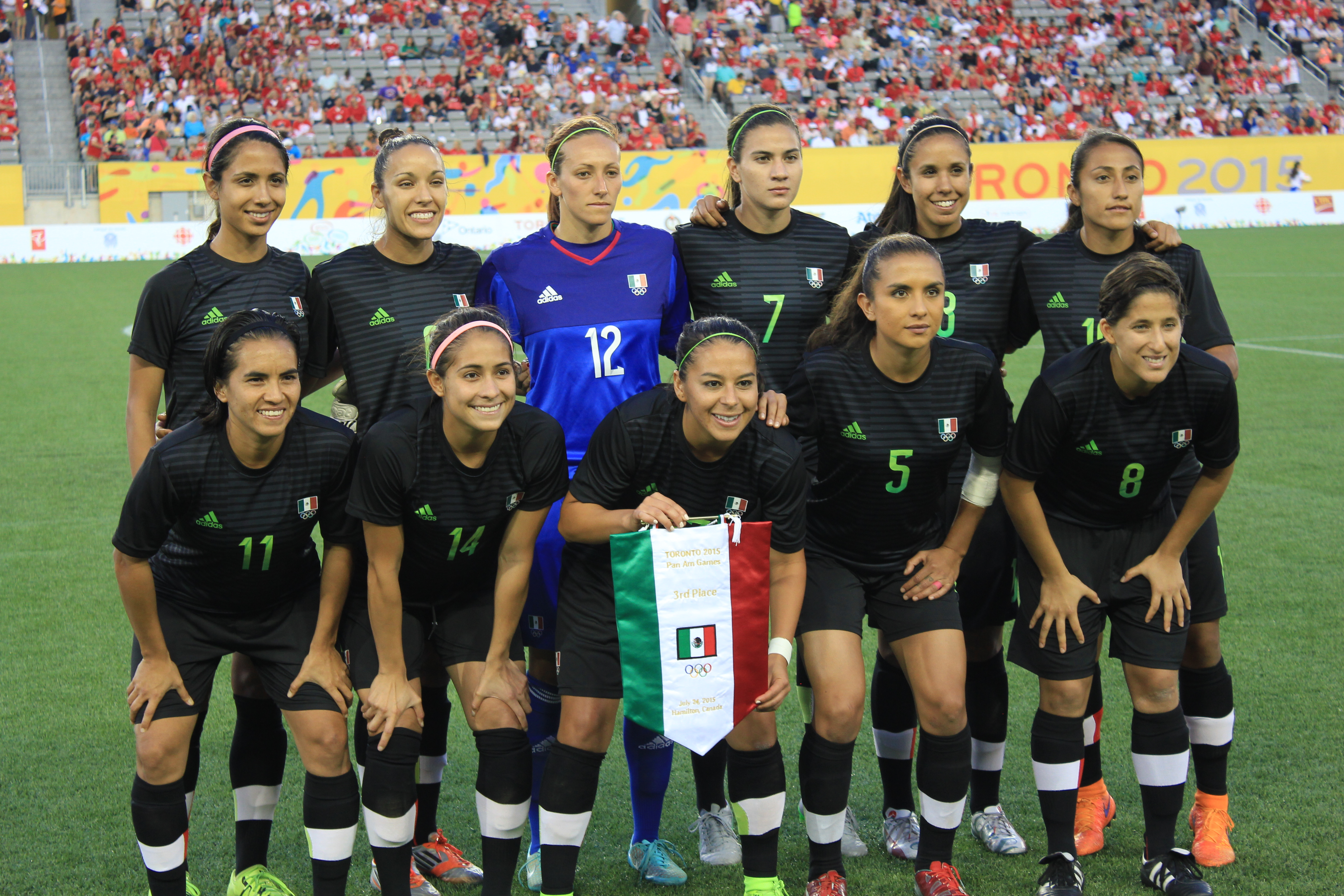
Mexico 2015

== Squads ==
At the start of tournament, all eight participating countries had to submit up to 18 players on their squads.

- Argentina
- Brazil
- Canada
- Colombia
- Costa Rica
- Ecuador
- Mexico
- Trinidad and Tobago

== Competition format ==
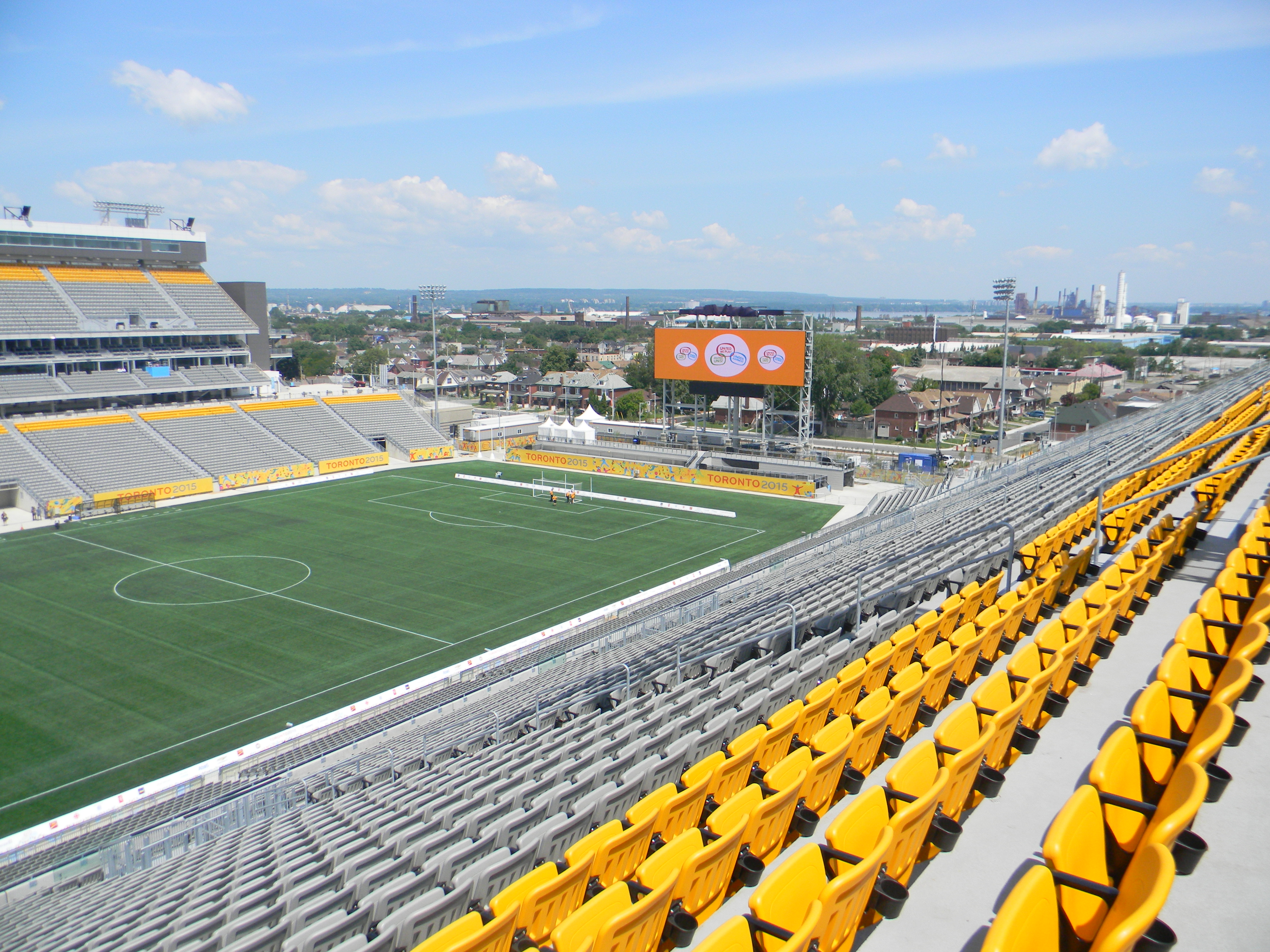
Tim Hortons Field (Hamilton Pan Am Soccer Stadium), was the venue for the football competitions

In the first round of the competition, teams were divided into two groups of four teams, played in round-robin format with each of the teams playing all other teams in the group once. Teams were awarded three points for a win, one point for a draw and zero points for a loss. The teams were ranked as follows:

1. Points
2. Goal difference
3. Goals scored
4. Head-to-head points
5. Drawing of lots

Following the completion of the group games, the top two teams in each group advanced to the semifinals, with the winners of one group playing the runners-up of another group. The winners of the semifinals advanced to the gold medal match and the losers advanced to the bronze medal match.

All games were played in two 45-minute halves. In the medal round, if the match ended in a draw after 90 minutes, extra time was played (two 15-minute halves), followed by penalty kicks competition if the match still remained tied.

== First round ==
The official detailed schedule and draw was revealed on April 24, 2015.

All times were Eastern Daylight Time (UTC−4)

=== Group A ===
Pos	Team	Pld	W	D	L	GF	GA	GD	Pts	Qualification
1	Colombia	3	2	1	0	4	1	+3	7	Medal round
2	Mexico	3	2	0	1	6	3	+3	6	Medal round
3	Trinidad and Tobago	3	0	2	1	4	6	−2	2	
4	Argentina	3	0	1	2	3	7	−4	1	

Source: Toronto 2015
July 11, 2015
11:05

Mexico	0–1	Colombia
	Report	Usme 65'

Hamilton Pan Am Soccer Stadium, Hamilton
Referee: Maurees Skeete (Guyana)

July 11, 2015
14:05

Argentina	2–2	Trinidad and Tobago
Larroquette 52'; Potassa 88'	Report	Shade 59'; Attin-Johnson 90'

Hamilton Pan Am Soccer Stadium, Hamilton
Referee: Mirian Leon (El Salvador)

July 14, 2015
17:35

Argentina	1–3	Mexico
Bonsegundo 82'	Report	Noyola 1'; Rangel 73'; Ruiz 76'

Hamilton Pan Am Soccer Stadium, Hamilton
Referee: Marianela Cruz (Costa Rica)

July 14, 2015
20:35

Colombia	1–1	Trinidad and Tobago
Vidal 4'	Report	Cordner 87'

Hamilton Pan Am Soccer Stadium, Hamilton
Referee: Marie-Soleil Beaudoin (Canada)

July 18, 2015
17:35

Trinidad and Tobago	1–3	Mexico
Shade 51' (pen.)	Report	Mayor 28', 45'; Ocampo 70'

Hamilton Pan Am Soccer Stadium, Hamilton
Referee: Mirian Leon (El Salvador)

July 18, 2015
20:35

Argentina	0–2	Colombia
	Report	Arias 44'; Usme 51'

Hamilton Pan Am Soccer Stadium, Hamilton
Referee: Alondra Arellano (Mexico)

=== Group B ===
Pos	Team	Pld	W	D	L	GF	GA	GD	Pts	Qualification
1	Brazil	3	3	0	0	12	1	+11	9	Medal round
2	Canada (H)	3	1	0	2	5	6	−1	3	Medal round
3	Costa Rica	3	1	0	2	2	5	−3	3	
4	Ecuador	3	1	0	2	5	12	−7	3	

Source: Toronto 2015
(H) Hosts
July 11, 2015
18:05

Costa Rica	0–3	Brazil
	Report	Raquel 14'; Thaisa 34'; Formiga 90'

Hamilton Pan Am Soccer Stadium, Hamilton
Referee: Katja Koroleva (United States)

July 11, 2015
21:05

Canada	5–2	Ecuador
Beckie 12', 77'; Zadorsky 44', 48'; Fletcher 79'	Report	Moreira 29', 90'

Hamilton Pan Am Soccer Stadium, Hamilton
Referee: Alondra Arellano (Mexico)

July 15, 2015
17:35

Brazil	7–1	Ecuador
Monica 17'; Cristiane 44', 55', 67', 70', 78'; Maurine 84'	Report	Pesántes 5'

Hamilton Pan Am Soccer Stadium, Hamilton
Referee: Gillian Martindale (Barbados)

July 15, 2015
20:35

Costa Rica	2–0	Canada
Cruz 60'; Villalobos 74'	Report

Hamilton Pan Am Soccer Stadium, Hamilton
Referee: Tatiana Guzman (Nicaragua)

July 19, 2015
17:35

Ecuador	2–0	Costa Rica
Real 10', 90+1'	Report

Hamilton Pan Am Soccer Stadium, Hamilton
Referee: Cardella Samuels (Jamaica)

July 19, 2015
20:35

Canada	0–2	Brazil
	Report	Alves 55'; Cristiane 87'

Hamilton Pan Am Soccer Stadium, Hamilton
Referee: Katja Koroleva (United States)

== Medal round ==
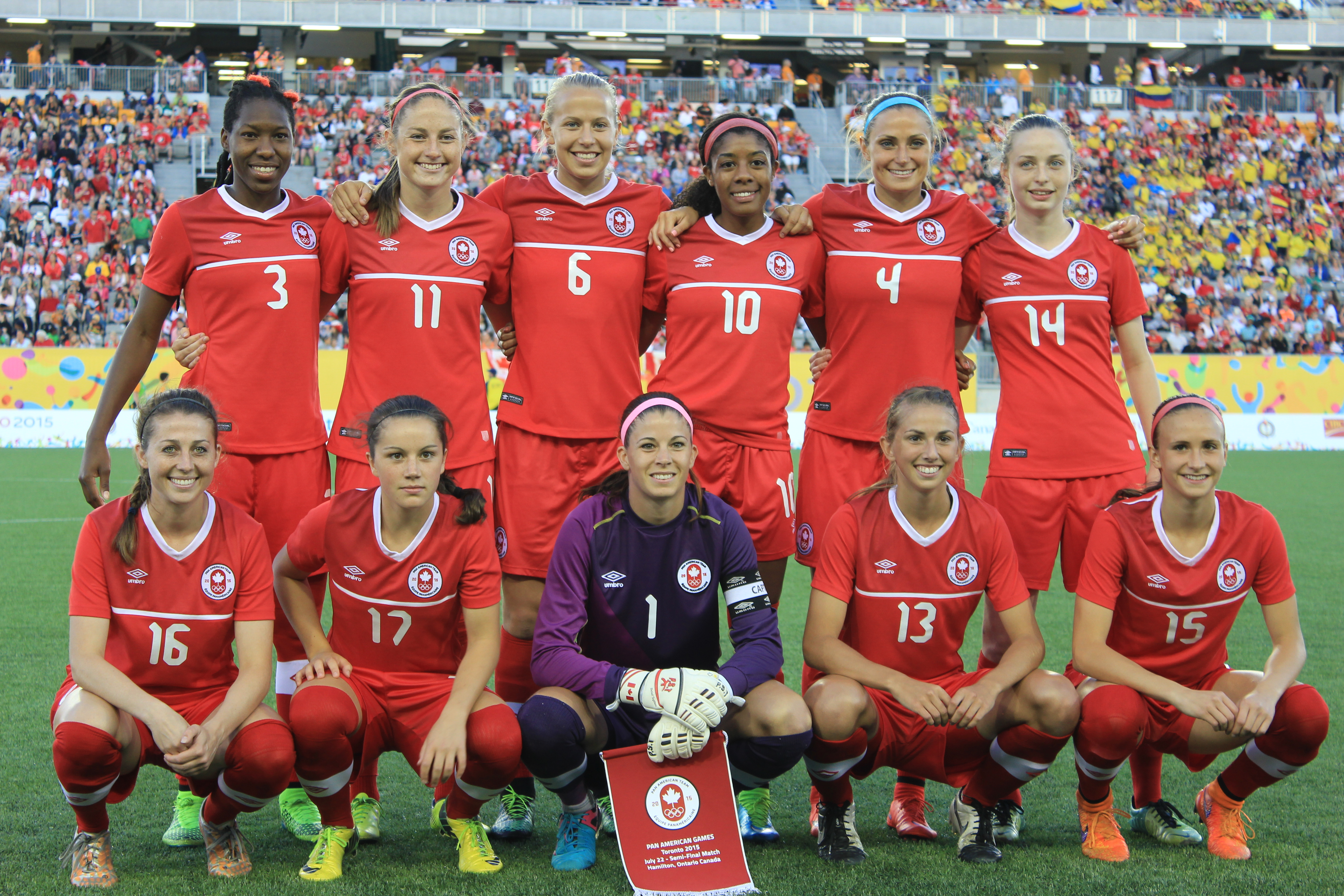
Team Canada 4th place

Semifinals
July 22 – Hamilton
Brazil	4
Mexico	2
July 22 – Hamilton
Colombia	1
Canada	0

Gold medal match
July 25 – Hamilton
Brazil	4
Colombia	0
Bronze medal match
July 24 – Hamilton
Mexico	2
Canada	1

=== Semifinals ===
July 22, 2015
17:35

Brazil	4–2	Mexico
Cristiane 4'; Rafaelle 45+1', 73'; Romero 46' (o.g.)	Report	Fabiana 25' (o.g.); Rangel 70'

Hamilton Pan Am Soccer Stadium, Hamilton
Referee: Marie-Soleil Beaudoin (Canada)

July 22, 2015
20:35

Colombia	1–0	Canada
Ospina 29'	Report

Hamilton Pan Am Soccer Stadium, Hamilton
Referee: Mirian Leon (El Salvador)

=== Bronze medal match ===
July 24, 2015
20:35

(bronze) Mexico	2–1	Canada
Ocampo 29'; Mayor 37'	Report	Fleming 88' (pen.)

Hamilton Pan Am Soccer Stadium, Hamilton
Referee: Katja Koroleva (United States)

=== Gold medal match ===
July 25, 2015
18:35

(gold) Brazil	4–0	Colombia (silver)
Formiga 7'; Maurine 75'; Alves 86'; Fabiana 90+3'	Report

Hamilton Pan Am Soccer Stadium, Hamilton
Referee: Mirian León (El Salvador)

Brazil	Colombia

GK	12	Bárbara
DF	2	Fabiana
DF	4	Rafaelle
DF	14	Érika
DF	6	Tamires
MF	8	Formiga
MF	5	Thaisa
MF	10	Andressa Machry	(substituted off) 73'
MF	11	Cristiane
FW	9	Andressa Alves	(substituted off) 88'
FW	17	Raquel	(substituted off) 45'
Substitutes:
MF	15	Gabi	(substituted on) 45'
MF	7	Maurine	(substituted on) 73'
DF	13	Poliana	(substituted on) 88'
Manager:
(Brazil) Vadão

GK	12	Sandra Sepúlveda	(substituted off) 45'
DF	2	Isabella Echeverri
DF	13	Ángela Clavijo
DF	14	Nataly Arias
DF	15	Tatiana Ariza	(substituted off) 45'
DF	9	Oriánica Velásquez
MF	3	Natalia Gaitán
MF	4	Diana Ospina
MF	6	Daniela Montoya
MF	18	Leicy Santos	(substituted off) 81'
FW	7	Ingrid Vidal
Substitutes:
MF	8	Mildrey Pineda	(substituted on) 81'
GK	1	Paula Forero	(substituted on) 45'
MF	11	Catalina Usme	(substituted on) 45'
Manager:
(Colombia) Felipe Taborda

2015 Pan American Games winners

Brazil
Third title

== Competition summary ==
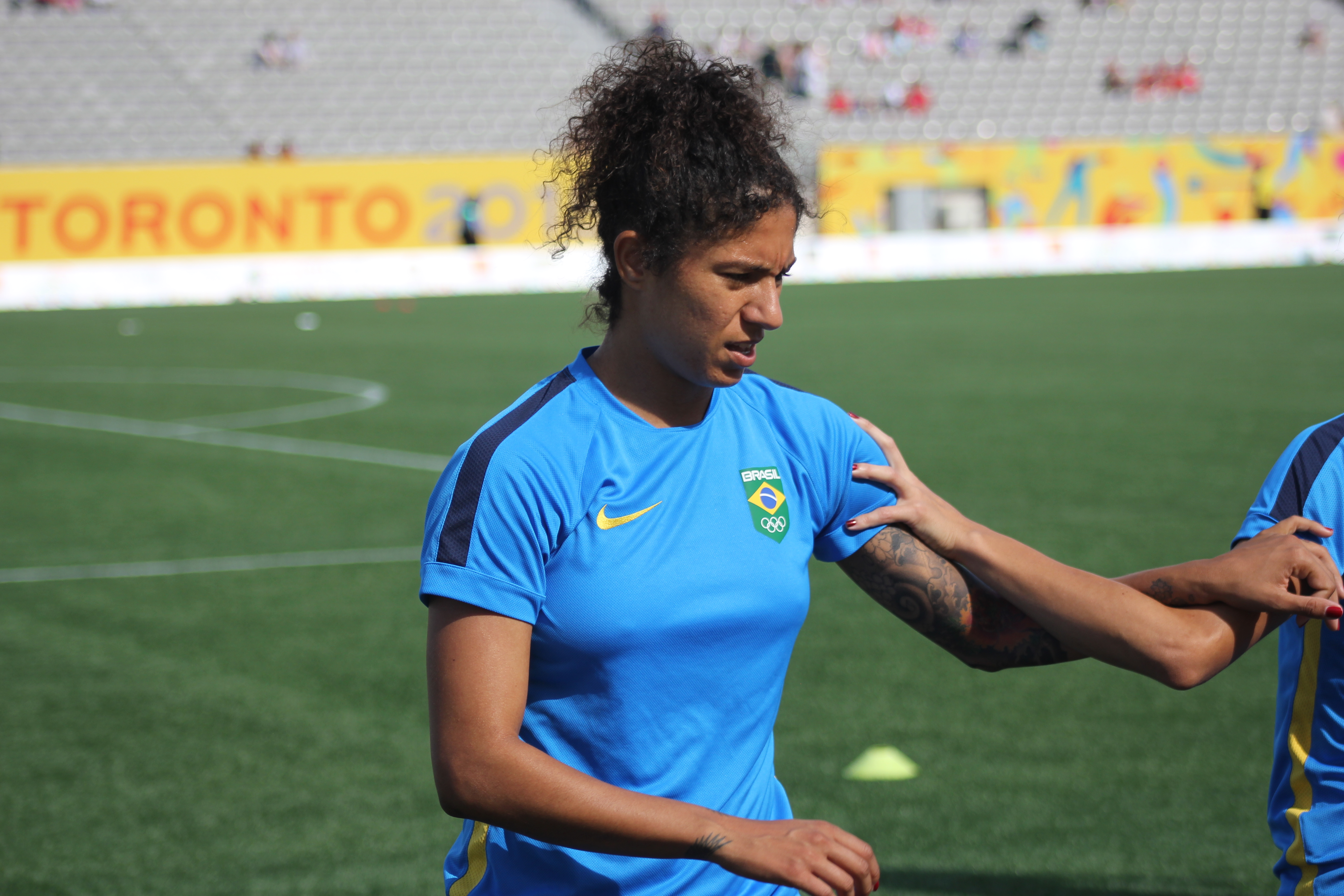
Cristiane top goal scorer

2015 Pan American Games women's football tournament
Tournament details
- Host country: Canada
- City: Hamilton, Ontario
- Dates: 11–25 July 2015
- Teams: 8 (from 2 confederations)
- Venue: 1 (in 1 host city)

Final positions
- Champions: Brazil (3rd title)
- Runners-up: Colombia
- Third place: Mexico
- Fourth place: Canada

Tournament statistics
- Matches played: 16
- Goals scored: 55 (3.44 per match)
- Top scorer: (Brazil) Cristiane (7 goals)

=== Goalscorers ===
7 goals

- (Brazil) Cristiane

3 goals

- (Mexico) Stephany Mayor

2 goals

- (Brazil) Andressa Alves
- (Brazil) Formiga
- (Brazil) Maurine
- (Brazil) Rafaelle
- (Canada) Janine Beckie
- (Canada) Shelina Zadorsky
- (Colombia) Catalina Usme
- (Ecuador) Ligia Moreira
- (Ecuador) Kerlly Real
- (Mexico) Mónica Ocampo
- (Mexico) Nayeli Rangel
- (Trinidad and Tobago) Mariah Shade

1 goal

- (Argentina) Florencia Bonsegundo
- (Argentina) Mariana Larroquette
- (Argentina) María Belén Potassa
- (Brazil) Fabiana
- (Brazil) Monica
- (Brazil) Raquel
- (Brazil) Thaisa
- (Canada) Jessie Fleming
- (Canada) Emma Fletcher
- (Colombia) Nataly Arias
- (Colombia) Diana Ospina
- (Colombia) Ingrid Vidal
- (Costa Rica) Shirley Cruz
- (Costa Rica) Karla Villalobos
- (Ecuador) Denise Pesántes
- (Mexico) Teresa Noyola
- (Mexico) Jennifer Ruiz
- (Trinidad and Tobago) Maylee Atthin-Johnson
- (Trinidad and Tobago) Kennya Cordner

1 own goal

- (Brazil) Fabiana (playing against Mexico)
- (Mexico) Arianna Romero (playing against Brazil)

=== Final standings ===
Rank	Team	Pld	W	D	L	GF	GA	GD	Pts	Final result
1st place, gold medalist(s)	Brazil	5	5	0	0	20	3	+17	15	Gold medal
2nd place, silver medalist(s)	Colombia	5	3	1	1	5	5	0	10	Silver medal
3rd place, bronze medalist(s)	Mexico	5	3	0	2	10	8	+2	9	Bronze medal
4	Canada (H)	5	1	0	4	6	9	−3	3	Fourth place
5	Costa Rica	3	1	0	2	2	5	−3	3	Eliminated in First round
6	Ecuador	3	1	0	2	5	12	−7	3	Eliminated in First round
7	Trinidad and Tobago	3	0	2	1	4	6	−2	2	Eliminated in First round
8	Argentina	3	0	1	2	3	7	−4	1	Eliminated in First round

Source: Toronto 2015
(H) Hosts
