= 2011 Matchworld Women's Cup =

Tournament details
- Host country: Switzerland
- Dates: 15–20 June 2011
- Teams: 4 (from 3 confederations)
- Venues: 3 (in 3 host cities)

Final positions
- Champions: Denmark (1st title)
- Runners-up: New Zealand
- Third place: Colombia
- Fourth place: Wales

Tournament statistics
- Matches played: 6
- Goals scored: 11 (1.83 per match)
- Top scorer: Sanne Troelsgaard Nielsen

The 2011 Matchworld Women's Cup was the first edition of the Matchworld Women's Cup, a global invitational tournament for national teams in women's football (soccer). Held in Switzerland in June 2011, matches were staged in Savièse, Apples and Naters. Denmark won the four team tournament which also featured New Zealand, Colombia and Wales. They played against each other in a single round-robin tournament with the group winner also being the winner of the tournament.

== Table ==
Team	Pld	W	D	L	GF	GA	GD	Pts
Denmark	3	2	1	1	5	0	+4	7
New Zealand	3	2	0	1	3	1	+2	6
Colombia	3	1	1	1	4	3	+1	4
Wales	3	0	0	3	1	8	−7	0

== Results ==
15 June 2011
18.00 CEST

New Zealand	2–0	Wales
Hearn 7'; Green 72'	Report

St-Germain Stadium, Savièse
Referee: Simona Ghisletta (Switzerland)

15 June 2011
20.30 CEST

Colombia	1–1	Denmark
Dominguez 75'	Report	Pedersen 68'
Penalties
Gaitan (penalty scored); Nataly Arias (penalty scored); Salazar (penalty scored); Dominguez (penalty missed)	3–1	(penalty missed) Pedersen; (penalty scored) Troelsgaard Nielsen; (penalty missed) Theresa Nielsen; (penalty missed) Harder

St-Germain Stadium, Savièse
Referee: Rui Mestre (Switzerland)

18 June 2011
15.30 CEST

Wales	0–3	Denmark
	Report	Troelsgaard Nielsen 3', 45', 71'

Terrain des Planches, Apples
Attendance: 308
Referee: Yves Degaller (Switzerland)

18 June 2011
18.15 CEST

New Zealand	1–0	Colombia
Hassett 70'	Report

Terrain des Planches, Apples
Referee: Damir Omerovic (Switzerland)

20 June 2011
17:30 CEST

Denmark	1–0	New Zealand
Pedersen 25'	Report

Sportanlage Stapfen, Naters
Referee: Barbara Spagnolo (Switzerland)

20 June 2011
20:00 CEST

Colombia	3–1	Wales
Ospina 22'; Rodallega 37', 61'	Report	Green 40' (Note: The Matchworld report says Michelle Green scored Wales's goal. The Football Association of Wales report attributes the goal to Helen Lander.)

Sportanlage Stapfen, Naters
Referee: Simona Ghisletta (Switzerland)

== Winners ==
Matchworld Women's Cup
2011 winners

Denmark
First title

== Goalscorers ==
3 goals

- (Denmark) Sanne Troelsgaard Nielsen

2 goals

- (Denmark) Kristine Pedersen
- (Colombia) Carmen Rodallega
