= Helen Ward (footballer) =

Welsh footballer (born 1986)

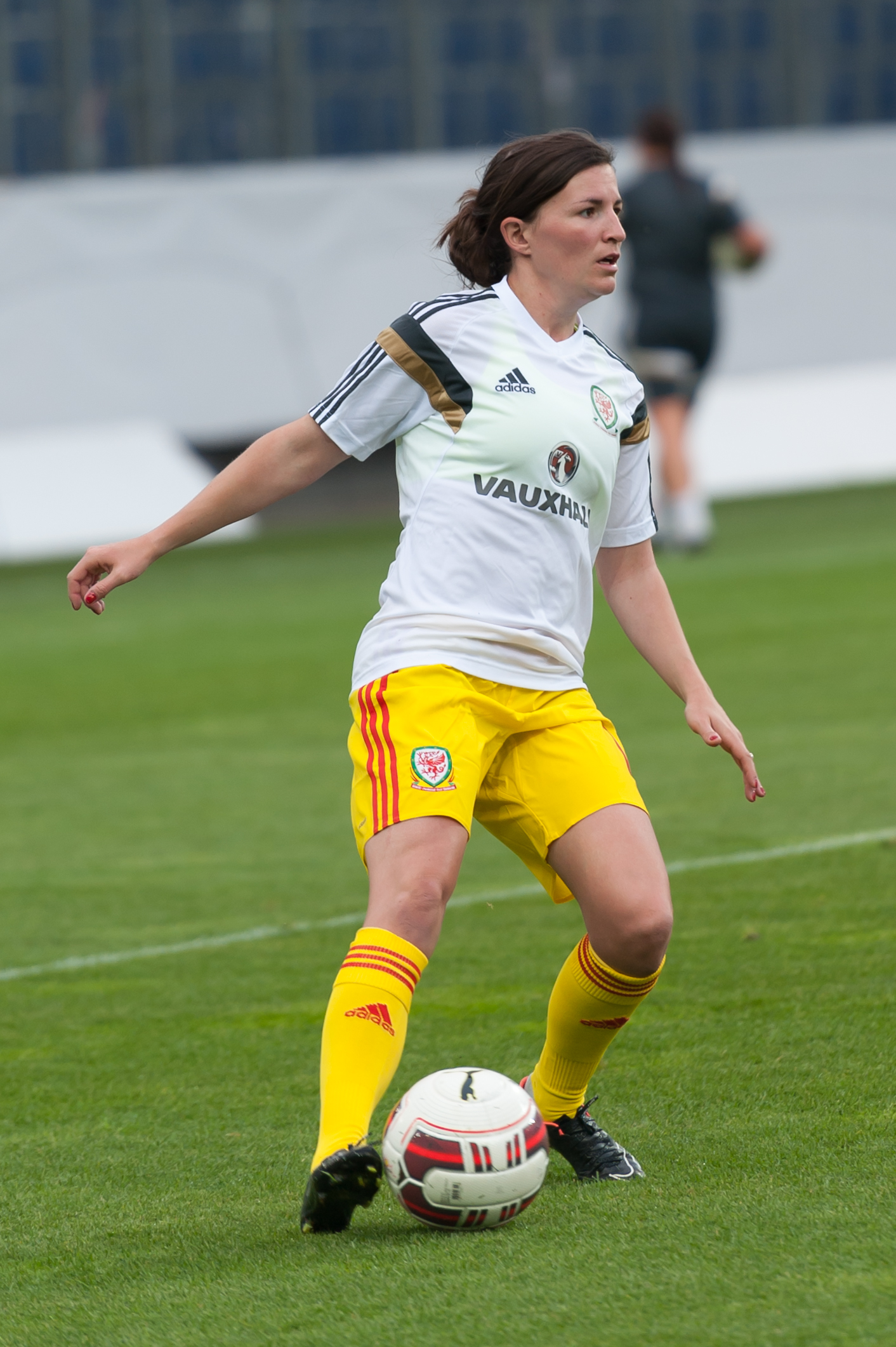
- Helen Ward in 2015

Personal information
- Full name: Helen Jane Ward
- Date of birth: 26 April 1986 (age 40)
- Place of birth: Brent, England
- Position: Striker

Youth career
- Watford

Senior career*
Years	Team	Apps	(Gls)
–2009	Watford		
2009–2010	Arsenal	27	(8)
2010–2013	Chelsea	41	(12)
2013–2017	Reading	27	(11)
2017–2023	Watford	37	(20)
2021	→ London Bees (loan)	4	(0)

International career^{‡}
2007	England U23	1	(0)
2008–2023	Wales	105	(44)
- * Club domestic league appearances and goals as of 10 November 2019 ‡ National team caps and goals as of 01 May 2023

Helen Jane Ward (née Lander; born 26 April 1986) is a former international football striker who last played club football for Watford. Ward previously spent three seasons with Chelsea Ladies, whom she joined from Arsenal in 2010. Born in the London Borough of Brent, Ward began her career with 14 years at Watford Ladies where she was a prolific goal scorer and team captain.

Ward played for the England under-23 team in 2007, but chose to represent Wales at senior level in 2008. With 44 goals, she was the Welsh national team's all–time record goal scorer until Jess Fishlock broke her record on 14 July 2024 against Kosovo.

== Club career ==
Ward began her career with Watford Ladies, joining at the age of nine and progressing to become captain of the senior side. She left to join Arsenal Ladies in January 2009, scoring on her debut later that month as Arsenal beat Colchester United in the FA Women's Cup.

Ward moved to Chelsea Ladies in September 2010.

In December 2013, Ward announced a transfer from Chelsea to Reading. There she was reunited with former Arsenal and Wales teammate Jayne Ludlow, who was Reading's manager. Ward returned to training ahead of the 2015 FA WSL 2 season, after giving birth to daughter Emily in September 2014.

On 8 February 2017, Ward joined newly promoted FA WSL 1 side Yeovil Town Ladies, but was forced to withdraw from her contract after announcing she was pregnant with her second child.

The forward joined home town Watford F.C. Women, ahead of the 2017–18 season, before signing a contract extension ahead of the 2018–19 campaign with the club.

In February 2021, Ward joined London Bees on a short-term dual registration basis, whilst her parent club waited for their season to resume due to the COVID-19 pandemic.

In March 2023, Ward announced her retirement from football at the end of the 2023–24 season.

== International career ==
In July 2007, Ward made a 10-minute substitute appearance for the England women's national under-23 football team in a 4–1 Nordic Cup defeat by Finland.

Ward represented England at Under-23 level, but, due to her Welsh maternal grandfather, she made her senior debut for Wales against Luxembourg on 30 September 2008. Wales came from behind to win 6–1, with Ward scoring the second goal.

In August 2010, Ward scored six goals in Wales' 15–0 win over Azerbaijan. She was listed as a Chelsea player. By the time of Ward's 50th cap, against Belarus in September 2013, she had scored 30 international goals. Ward became the all-time top scorer for Wales with 44 goals in 105 appearances until Jess Fishlock broke her record on 14 July 2024.

On 8 April 2022, Ward played her 100th match for Wales in a 2–1 defeat to France in the 2023 FIFA Women's World Cup qualification.

On 3 March 2023, Ward announced her retirement from international football.

=== International goals ===
Scores and results list Wales's goal tally first.

Goal	Date	Venue	Opponent	Result	Competition	Scored
1	30 September 2008	Stade Alphonse Theis, Hesperange	Luxembourg	6–1	Friendly	1
2	12 November 2008	Richmond Park, Carmarthen	Finland	1–2	Friendly	1
3	9 March 2009	Municipal Stadium, Loulé	Poland	5–1	2009 Algarve Cup	1
4	28 October 2009	Ismat Gayibov Stadium, Baku	Azerbaijan	1–2	2011 FIFA World Cup Qual.	1
10	21 August 2010	Latham Park, Newtown	Azerbaijan	15–0	2011 FIFA World Cup Qual.	6
12	24 November 2010	The Rock, Cefn Mawr	Bulgaria	8–1	Friendly	2
13	13 February 2011	Bridge Meadow Stadium, Haverfordwest	Scotland	2–4	Friendly	1
14	4 March 2011	Municipal Stadium, Lagos	Romania	2–1	2011 Algarve Cup	1
15	9 March 2011	Municipal Stadium, Albufeira	China	1–2	2011 Algarve Cup	1
16	20 June 2011	Sportanlage Stapfen, Naters	Colombia	1–3	2011 Matchworld Women's Cup	1
18	23 August 2011	The Oval, Belfast	Northern Ireland	2–0	Friendly	2
19	27 October 2011	Tynecastle Stadium, Edinburgh	Scotland	2–2	2013 UEFA Women's Championship Qual.	1
20	20 November 2011	Ness Ziona Stadium, Ness Ziona	Israel	2–0	2013 UEFA Women's Championship Qual.	1
22	5 March 2012	Vila Real de Santo António	Hungary	2–0	2012 Algarve Cup	2
23	16 June 2012	Turners Cross, Cork	Republic of Ireland	1–0	2013 UEFA Women's Championship Qual.	1
24	8 August 2012	Stade Communal de Bielmont, Verviers	Belgium	5–3	Friendly	1
25	15 September 2012	Parc y Scarlets, Llanelli	Scotland	1–2	2013 UEFA Women's Championship Qual.	1
26	15 January 2013	Dimotiko Stadio, Glyfada	Greece	3–0	Friendly	1
27	11 March 2013	Municipal Stadium, Quarteira	Hungary	1–1	2013 Algarve Cup	1
28	17 June 2013	NTC Senec, Senec	Slovakia	2–2	Friendly	1
29	19 June 2013	NTC Senec, Senec	Slovakia	1–1	Friendly	1
30	26 September 2013	Cardiff City Stadium, Cardiff	Belarus	1–0	2015 FIFA World Cup Qual.	1
32	23 November 2013	Gradski stadion, Nikšić	Montenegro	3–0	2015 FIFA World Cup Qual.	2
33	6 April 2015	Nantporth, Bangor	Slovakia	1–0	Friendly	1
36	26 November 2015	Bridge Meadow Stadium, Haverfordwest	Kazakhstan	4–0	2017 UEFA Women's Championship Qual.	3
37	4 March 2016	Paralimni Stadium, Paralimni	Poland	1–1	2016 Cyprus Women's Cup	1
39	12 April 2016	Bridge Meadow Stadium, Haverfordwest	Kazakhstan	4–0	2017 UEFA Women's Championship Qual.	2
41	15 September 2016	Rodney Parade, Newport	Israel	3–0	2017 UEFA Women's Championship Qual.	2
42	1 March 2017	Paralimni Stadium, Paralimni	Hungary	2–0	2017 Cyprus Women's Cup	1
43	22 October 2020	Rodney Parade, Newport	Faroe Islands	4–0	2022 UEFA Women's Championship Qual.	1
44	26 October 2021	Cardiff City Stadium, Cardiff	Estonia	4–0	2023 FIFA Women's World Cup Qual.	1

== Legacy ==
In 2024, a statue of Lady Rhondda was unveiled, which includes a circle of hands cast from forty women’s hands, among them the hands of Ward.

== Personal life ==
She graduated from Staffordshire University in 2017 with a First Class degree having studied for a BA (Hons) in Professional Sports Writing & Broadcasting, through a partnership between the University and the Professional Footballers' Association.
