= Mônica (footballer, born 1987) =

Brazilian footballer

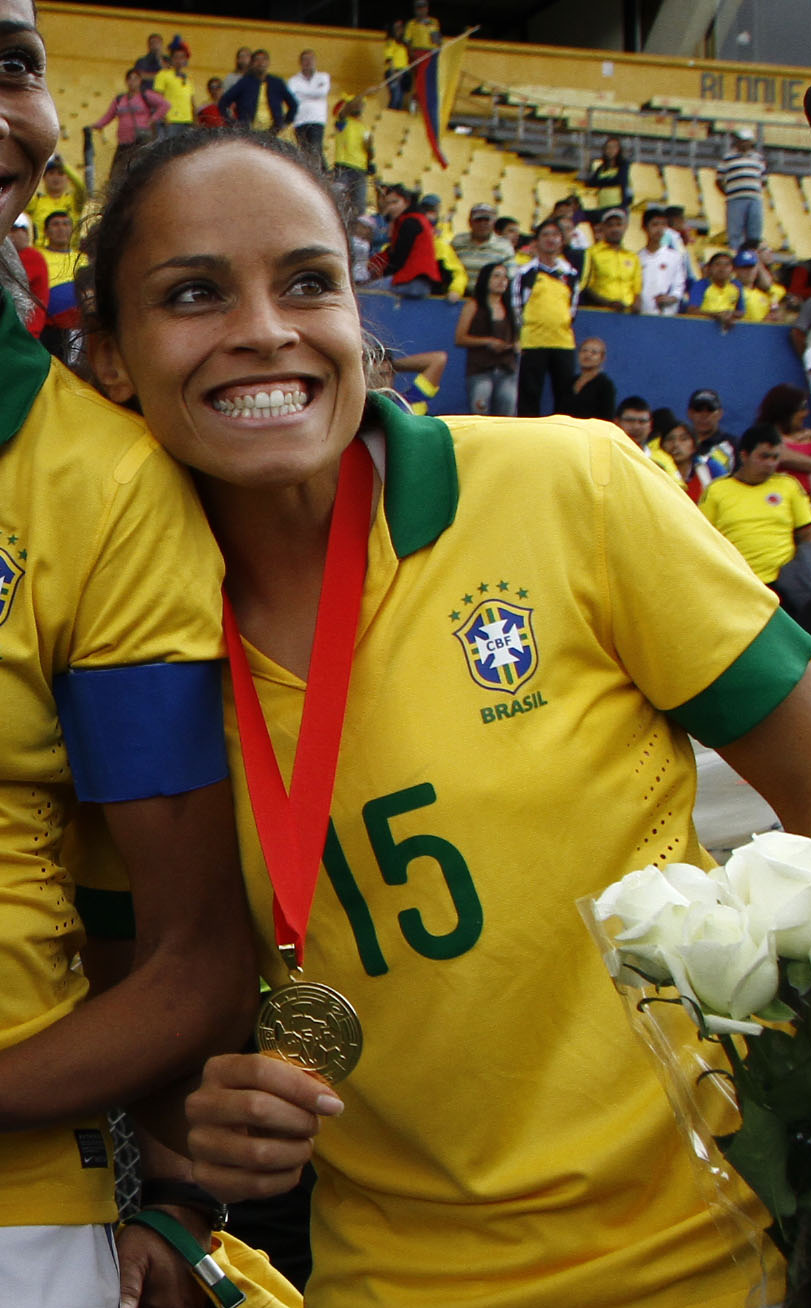
- Mônica at the 2014 Copa América Femenina

Personal information
- Full name: Mônica Hickmann Alves
- Date of birth: 21 April 1987 (age 39)
- Place of birth: Porto Alegre, Brazil
- Height: 1.68 m (5 ft 6 in)
- Position: Defender

Team information
- Current team: Madrid CFF
- Number: 5

Senior career*
Years	Team	Apps	(Gls)
- Internacional
- Marília
2007–2012	SV Neulengbach		
2012	Botucatu		
2013	Foz Cataratas	5	(0)
2013–2014	Ferroviária	10	(0)
2015	Flamengo	6	(0)
2016–2018	Orlando Pride	52	(0)
2016–2017	→ Adelaide United (loan)	9	(1)
2017–2018	→ Atlético Madrid (loan)	11	(1)
2019	Corinthians	3	(0)
2019–	Madrid CFF	61	(7)

International career^{‡}
2014–	Brazil	42	(6)
Medal record
Women's football
Representing Brazil
Pan American Games
Gold medal – first place	2015 Toronto	Team
- * Club domestic league appearances and goals as of 8 September 2019 ‡ National team caps and goals as of 23 June 2015

Mônica Hickmann Alves (born 21 April 1987), commonly known as Mônica, is a Brazilian professional footballer who plays as a defender for Spanish Liga F club Madrid CFF and the Brazil national team. She participated in the 2015 and 2019 FIFA Women's World Cups and the 2016 Rio Olympics.

== Club career ==
Between 2007 and 2012, Mônica played club football in Austria for SV Neulengbach, the dominant team in the ÖFB-Frauenliga. Upon returning to Brazil, she had a short spell with Botucatu Futebol Clube, then joined Ferroviária ahead of the 2013 season.

She then joined the new expansion side, the Orlando Pride of the National Women's Soccer League for the 2016 season, complemented by loan spells with Adelaide United and Atlético Madrid in the 2016 and 2017 offseasons respectively. On February 18, 2019, after three seasons with Orlando she announced she was leaving the club.

In April 2019, Mônica signed for reigning Campeonato Brasileiro de Futebol Feminino champions Corinthians.

In August 2019, Mônica signed for Spanish Primera División club Madrid CFF.

== International career ==
At the 2006 FIFA U-20 Women's World Championship, Mônica was part of the Brazilian team which finished third. She made her senior Brazil women's national football team debut on 11 June 2014, a 0–0 friendly draw with France staged in Guyana. She scored her first national team goal in Brazil's 7–1 win over Ecuador at the 2015 Pan American Games. A controversial own goal by Mônica against Australia at the 2019 FIFA Women's World Cup saw Brazil lose its first group stage match in 24 years.

=== International goals ===
Scores and results list Brazil's goal tally first.

#	Date	Venue	Opponent	Score	Result	Competition
1.	15 July 2015	Hamilton Pan Am Soccer Stadium, Hamilton, Ontario	Ecuador	1–1	7–1	2015 Pan American Games
2.	21 October 2015	CenturyLink Field, Seattle, Washington	United States	1–0	1–1	Friendly
3.	20 December 2015	Arena das Dunas, Natal, Brazil	Canada	2–1	3–1	Torneio Internacional Natal 2015
4.	20 December 2015	Arena das Dunas, Natal, Brazil	Canada	3–1	3–1	Torneio Internacional Natal 2015
5.	4 August 2016	Estádio Olímpico João Havelange, Rio de Janeiro, Brazil	China	1–0	3–0	Olympics 2016
