= Sanne Troelsgaard =

Danish footballer (born 1988)

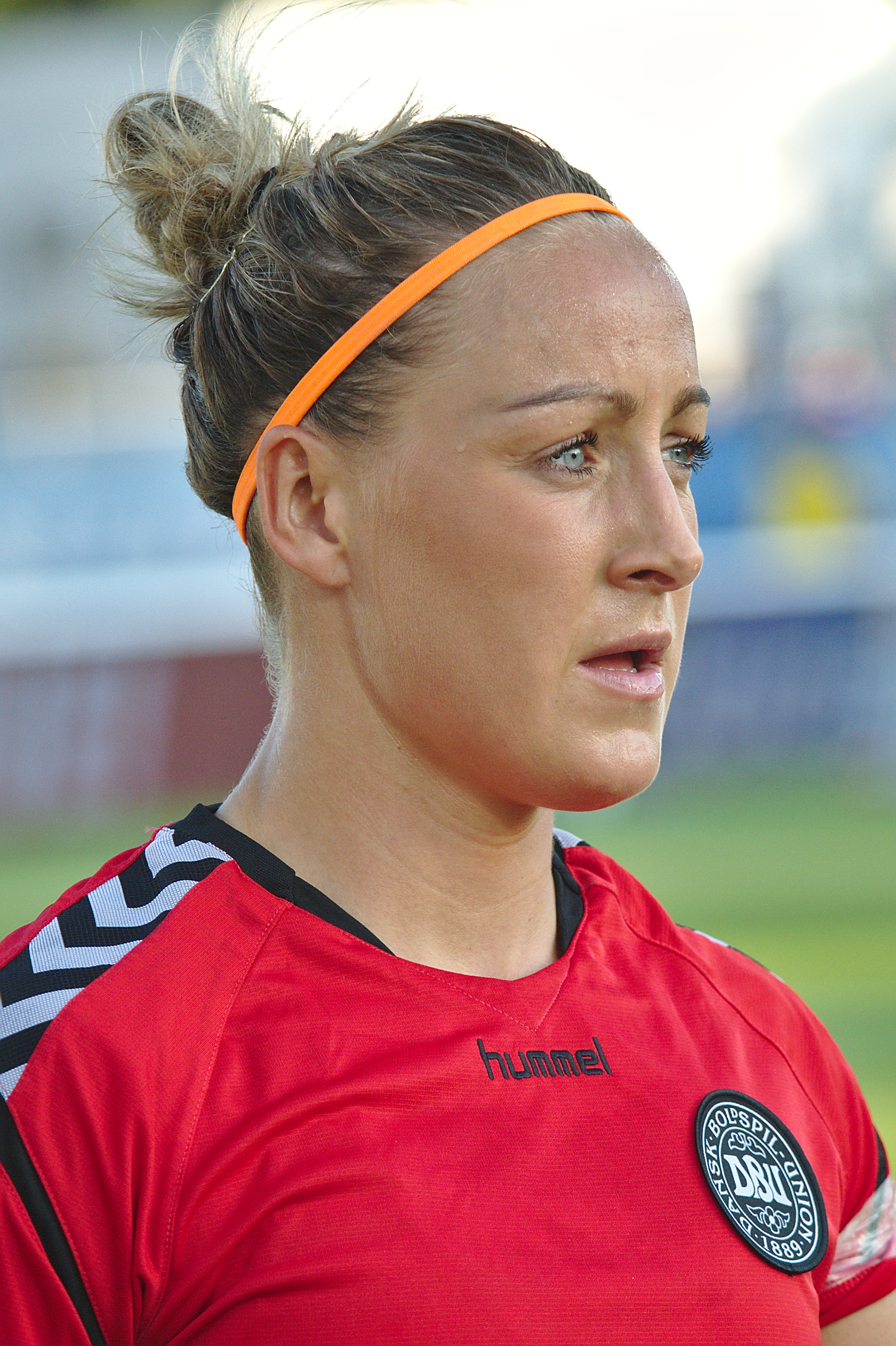
- Troelsgaard with Denmark in July 2017

Personal information
- Full name: Sanne Troelsgaard Nielsen
- Date of birth: 15 August 1988 (age 38)
- Place of birth: Vejen, Denmark
- Height: 1.76 m (5 ft 9 1/2 in)
- Positions: Midfielder; forward

Team information
- Current team: FC Midtjylland
- Number: 51

Youth career
- Vejen
- –2004: Haderslev FK

Senior career*
Years	Team	Apps	(Gls)
2005–2009	SønderjyskE		
2009–2011	Brøndby IF		
2011–2012	IK Skovbakken		
2012–2014	Brøndby IF		
2014–2017	KoldingQ		
2017–2021	Rosengård	146	(54)
2021–2024	Reading	51	(9)
2024–2025	AS Roma	42	(2)
2025–	FC Midtjylland	11	(3)

International career^{‡}
2008–2025	Denmark	197	(57)
Medal record
Association football
Representing Denmark
European Championship
Silver medal – second place	2017 Netherlands	Team
- * Club domestic league appearances and goals as of 6 October 2025 ‡ National team caps and goals as of 6 October 2025

Sanne Troelsgaard Nielsen (born 15 August 1988) is a Danish professional footballer who plays as a midfielder for Danish A-Liga club FC Midtjylland. From 2008 to 2025, Troelsgaard played for the Denmark national team, with which she earned 197 caps and scored 57 goals.

Troelsgaard played youth football in Vejen and Haderslev FK, before starting her professional career with SønderjyskE in 2005 at 17. After four years, Troelsgaard signed with Brøndby IF in 2009 where she played for two years, winning the league with them in 2011, before moving to IK Skovbakken that same year. Troelsgaard was awarded Danish Football Player of the Year in 2011. In 2012, she returned to Brøndby for two years, where she won the league in 2013. During her time with Brøndby, Troelsgaard helped the club win the Danish Women's Cup four times. In 2014, Troelsgaard moved to Kolding Q, where she played for three years. She was also made captain of the team during her tenure. In 2017, she signed with Damallsvenskan club Rosengård, Troelsgaard's first foray into professional football, with whom she won the league twice. Troelsgaard continued her career abroad with Women's Super League club Reading in 2021, and left after the club's relegation in 2023 to join Serie A club AS Roma in 2024. Troelsgaard won the double with Roma in 2024, as they won both the league and the Coppa Italia. Troelsgaard decided to return to the Danish league in 2025 to help further establish Danish women's league football.

A legend of the Danish national team with a career spanning almost 20 years, Troelsgaard was part of five Danish international squads for both the UEFA Women's Euros and the FIFA Women's World Cup. She was a member of the 2017 Euros silver medal-winning squad. In October 2025, after 18 years with the national team, Troelsgaard announced her retirement from international football.

== Club career ==
In 2010, Troelsgaard won the Danish Cup with Brøndby IF, while winning the player of the tournament award. In 2011, she was named Denmark's Player of the Year after scoring 29 goals in her first 15 matches for IK Skovbakken. In February 2017, Troelsgaard signed for FC Rosengård in the Swedish Damallsvenskan.

On 21 December 2021, Reading announced the signing of Troelsgaard on a contract until June 2023. She scored her first Women's Super League goal against West Ham on 23 October 2022, scoring a penalty in the 82nd minute. On 11 January 2024, Reading announced the departure of Troelsgaard from the club by mutual consent.

On 2 February 2024, AS Roma announced the signing of Troelsgaard on a contract until 30 June 2024. On 28 May 2024, she signed a new one-year contract extension with the club.

On 1 July 2025, Troelsgaard was announced at FC Midtjylland on a two-year contract.

== International career ==
Troelsgaard made her senior international debut for Denmark in March 2008, playing the last four minutes of a 1–0 win over Finland at the 2008 Algarve Cup. At the 2011 Matchworld Women's Cup in June 2011, she scored all three goals in the Danes' 3–0 win over Wales.

A serious illness in the family caused Troelsgaard to withdraw from national coach Kenneth Heiner-Møller's squad for UEFA Women's Euro 2013.

On 19 June 2017, Troelsgaard was called up to the Danish squad for the UEFA Women's Euro 2017.

On 16 June 2022, Troelsgaard was called up to the Danish squad for the UEFA Women's Euro 2022.

On 30 June 2023, Troelsgaard was called up to the 23-player Danish squad for the 2023 FIFA Women's World Cup.

On 20 June 2025, Troelsgaard was called up to the Danish squad for the UEFA Women's Euro 2025.

Troelsgaard announced her retirement from the national team on 6 October 2025. Denmark men's coach Brian Riemer called Troelsgaard a luminary of Danish football and remarked that all her efforts to spotlight Danish women's football commands respect, while men's national team player Gustav Isaksen called her a leader and commended her total commitment as a player, as well as her charismatic personality and presence on the field. The Danish Football Association Head of Football declared Troelsgaard one of the biggest players in the history of Danish national team football. Troelsgaard herself released a statement wherein she stated the national team had been “a home” for her.

== Personal life ==
Troelsgaard has a twin sister, former footballer Lotte Troelsgaard, who retired her active playing career in 2019.

== Career statistics ==
=== Club ===
As of match played 30 April 2023

Appearances and goals by club, season and competition
Club	Season	League			National Cup		League Cup		Continental		Other		Total	
Club	Season	Division	Apps	Goals	Apps	Goals	Apps	Goals	Apps	Goals	Apps	Goals	Apps	Goals
Rosengård	2017	Damallsvenskan	21	8	5	4	-		6	0	-		32	12
Rosengård	2018	Damallsvenskan	21	8	6	11	-		4	0	-		31	19
Rosengård	2019	Damallsvenskan	22	3	4	2	-		0	0	-		26	5
Rosengård	2020	Damallsvenskan	22	2	1	1	-		2	3	-		25	6
Rosengård	2021	Damallsvenskan	21	9	5	2	-		6	1	-		32	12
Rosengård	Total		107	30	21	20	-	-	18	4	-	-	146	54
Reading	2021–22	FA Women's Super League	13	0	2	0	0	0	—		—		15	0
Reading	2022–23	FA Women's Super League	20	4	3	2	2	2	—		—		25	8
Reading	2023–24	Women's Championship	8	0	1	0	3	0	—		—		12	0
Reading	Total		41	4	6	2	5	2	-	-	-	-	52	8
Career total			148	34	27	22	5	2	18	4	-	-	198	62

=== International goals ===
No.	Date	Venue	Opponent	Score	Result	Competition
1.	24 October 2009	Vejle Stadion, Vejle, Denmark	Georgia	14–0	15–0	2011 FIFA Women's World Cup qualification
2.	24 October 2009	Vejle Stadion, Vejle, Denmark	Georgia	15–0	15–0	2011 FIFA Women's World Cup qualification
3.	27 March 2010	Vejle Stadion, Vejle, Denmark	Bulgaria	5–0	9–0	2011 FIFA Women's World Cup qualification
4.	18 June 2011	Terrain des Planches, Apples, Switzerland	Wales	1–0	3–0	2011 Matchworld Women's Cup
5.	18 June 2011	Terrain des Planches, Apples, Switzerland	Wales	2–0	3–0	2011 Matchworld Women's Cup
6.	18 June 2011	Terrain des Planches, Apples, Switzerland	Wales	3–0	3–0	2011 Matchworld Women's Cup
7.	21 September 2011	Mika Stadium, Yerevan, Armenia	Armenia	2–0	5–0	UEFA Women's Euro 2013 qualifying
8.	23 November 2011	Velje Stadion, Velje, Denmark	Armenia	1–0	11–0	UEFA Women's Euro 2013 qualifying
9.	23 November 2011	Velje Stadion, Velje, Denmark	Armenia	2–0	11–0	UEFA Women's Euro 2013 qualifying
10.	23 November 2011	Velje Stadion, Velje, Denmark	Armenia	7–0	11–0	UEFA Women's Euro 2013 qualifying
11.	8 December 2011	Estádio do Pacaembu, São Paulo, Brazil	Chile	2–0	4–0	2011 International Tournament of São Paulo
12.	15 December 2011	Estádio do Pacaembu, São Paulo, Brazil	Brazil	1–0	1–0	2011 International Tournament of São Paulo
13.	7 March 2012	Desportivo da Nora Park, Ferreiras, Portugal	Iceland	1–0	3–1	2012 Algarve Cup
14.	7 March 2012	Desportivo da Nora Park, Ferreiras, Portugal	Iceland	2–0	3–1	2012 Algarve Cup
15.	9 December 2012	Estádio do Pacaembu, São Paulo, Brazil	Mexico	4–0	5–0	2012 International Tournament of São Paulo
16.	24 November 2013	Centenary Stadium, Ta'Qali, Malta	Malta	1–0	5–0	2015 FIFA Women's World Cup qualification
17.	12 March 2014	Estádio Municipal, Albufeira, Portugal	China	1–1	1–1 (4–5 p)	2013 Algarve Cup
18.	19 June 2014	Ramat Gan Stadium, Ramat Gan, Israel	Israel	3–0	5–0	2015 FIFA Women's World Cup qualification
19.	12 January 2015	Kempinski Hotel Belek, Belek, Turkey	New Zealand	1–1	1–1	Friendly
20.	4 March 2015	Stadium Bela Vista, Parchal, Portugal	Japan	1–0	2–1	2015 Algarve Cup
21.	6 March 2015	Stadium Bela Vista, Parchal, Portugal	France	1–4	1–4	2015 Algarve Cup
22.	9 March 2015	Estádio Municipal, Vila Real de Santo António, Portugal	Portugal	1–0	2–2	2015 Algarve Cup
23.	8 April 2015	Tele2 Arena, Stockholm, Sweden	Sweden	2–2	3–3	Friendly
24.	17 September 2015	Stadionul CNAF, Buftea, Romania	Romania	2–0	2–0	Friendly
25.	22 October 2015	Viborg Stadion, Viborg, Denmark	Moldova	1–0	4–0	UEFA Women's Euro 2017 qualifying
26.	26 November 2015	NTC Senec, Senec, Slovakia	Slovakia	1–0	1–0	UEFA Women's Euro 2017 qualifying
27.	25 January 2016	Arcardia Belek, Belek, Turkey	Netherlands	1–1	1–2	Friendly
28.	9 March 2016	Bela Vista Municipal Stadium, Parchal, Portugal	Portugal	1–0	3–1	2016 Algarve Cup
29.	9 March 2016	Bela Vista Municipal Stadium, Parchal, Portugal	Portugal	2–0	3–1	2016 Algarve Cup
30.	2 June 2016	Viborg Stadion, Viborg, Denmark	Slovakia	4–0	4–0	UEFA Women's Euro 2017 qualifying
31.	7 June 2016	Viborg Stadion, Viborg, Denmark	Poland	1–0	6–0	UEFA Women's Euro 2017 qualifying
32.	7 June 2016	Viborg Stadion, Viborg, Denmark	Poland	3–0	6–0	UEFA Women's Euro 2017 qualifying
33.	7 June 2016	Viborg Stadion, Viborg, Denmark	Poland	6–0	6–0	UEFA Women's Euro 2017 qualifying
34.	20 October 2016	Yongchuan Sports Center, Yongchuan, China	Uzbekistan	1–1	2–1	2016 Yongchuan International Tournament
35.	3 March 2017	Bela Vista Municipal Stadium, Parchal, Portugal	Portugal	3–0	6–0	2017 Algarve Cup
36.	3 March 2017	Bela Vista Municipal Stadium, Parchal, Portugal	Portugal	6–0	6–0	2017 Algarve Cup
37.	11 April 2017	Harboe Arena Slagelse, Slagelse, Denmark	Finland	2–0	5–0	Friendly
38.	16 July 2017	De Vijverberg, Doetinchem, Netherlands	Belgium	1–0	1–0	UEFA Women's Euro 2017
39.	19 September 2017	Ménfői úti Stadion, Győr, Hungary	Hungary	2–1	6–1	2019 FIFA Women's World Cup qualification
40.	19 September 2017	Ménfői úti Stadion, Győr, Hungary	Hungary	3–1	6–1	2019 FIFA Women's World Cup qualification
41.	19 September 2017	Ménfői úti Stadion, Győr, Hungary	Hungary	5–1	6–1	2019 FIFA Women's World Cup qualification
42.	7 March 2018	VRS António Sports Complex, Vila Real de Santo António, Portugal	Iceland	1–0	1–1 (4–5 p)	2018 Algarve Cup
43.	9 April 2018	Viborg Stadium, Viborg, Denmark	Ukraine	1–0	1–0	2019 FIFA Women's World Cup qualification
44.	8 June 2018	Arena Lviv, Lviv, Ukraine	Ukraine	4–0	5–1	2019 FIFA Women's World Cup qualification
45.	8 June 2018	Arena Lviv, Lviv, Ukraine	Ukraine	5–1	5–1	2019 FIFA Women's World Cup qualification
46.	29 August 2019	Viborg Stadium, Viborg, Denmark	Malta	1–0	8–0	UEFA Women's Euro 2022 qualifying
47.	29 August 2019	Viborg Stadium, Viborg, Denmark	Malta	4–0	8–0	UEFA Women's Euro 2022 qualifying
48.	4 October 2019	Viborg Stadium, Viborg, Denmark	Bosnia and Herzegovina	2–0	2–0	UEFA Women's Euro 2022 qualifying
49.	17 September 2020	Bosnia and Herzegovina FA Training Centre, Zenica, Bosnia & Herzegovina	Bosnia and Herzegovina	2–0	4–0	UEFA Women's Euro 2022 qualifying
50.	22 September 2020	Centenary Stadium, Ta'Qali, Malta	Malta	4–0	8–0	UEFA Women's Euro 2022 qualifying
51.	22 September 2020	Centenary Stadium, Ta'Qali, Malta	Malta	8–0	8–0	UEFA Women's Euro 2022 qualifying
52.	16 September 2021	Viborg Stadium, Viborg, Denmark	Malta	1–0	7–0	2023 FIFA Women's World Cup qualification
53.	26 October 2021	Podgorica City Stadium, Podgorica, Montenegro	Montenegro	4–1	5–1	2023 FIFA Women's World Cup qualification
54.	30 November 2021	Viborg Stadium, Viborg, Denmark	Russia	2–0	3–1	2023 FIFA Women's World Cup qualification
55.	1 August 2023	Perth Rectangular Stadium, Perth, Australia	Haiti	2–0	2–0	2023 FIFA Women's World Cup
56.	26 September 2023	Cardiff City Stadium, Cardiff, Wales	Wales	4–1	5–1	2023–24 UEFA Women's Nations League

== Honours ==
Brøndby IF

- Elitedivisionen: 2010–11, 2012–13
- Danish Women's Cup: 2010, 2011, 2013, 2014

FC Rosengård

- Damallsvenskan: 2019, runner-up: 2020, 2017
- Svenska Cupen Women: 2017–2018, 2016–2017

AS Roma

- Serie A: 2023-24
- Coppa Italia: 2023-24
- Supercoppa italiana: 2024

== See also ==
- List of women's footballers with 100 or more international caps
