= Nadia Lawrence =

Welsh footballer

Personal information
- Full name: Nadia Patricia Lawrence
- Date of birth: 29 November 1989 (age 36)
- Position: Forward

Team information
- Current team: Cardiff City

Senior career*
Years	Team	Apps	(Gls)
- Cardiff Met.
2012–2013	Cardiff City LFC	16	(6)
2013–2014	ÍBV	29	(4)
2014–2015	Newcastle Emlyn		
2015	Bristol Academy	10	(0)
2016–2018	Yeovil Town	31	(2)
2018–	Cardiff City	29	(3)

International career^{‡}
2012–	Wales	42	(3)
- * Club domestic league appearances and goals as of 12:27, 21 August 2018 (UTC) ‡ National team caps and goals as of 15:25, 7 February 2016 (UTC)

Nadia Patricia Lawrence (born 29 November 1989) is a footballer who plays as a forward for the Wales national team. She won her first senior cap for Wales against Belgium in a 1–1 draw hosted at Mijnstadion, Beringen on 5 August 2012.
