= Yulieth Domínguez =

Colombian footballer (born 1993)

Personal information
- Full name: Yulieth Paola Domínguez Ochoa
- Date of birth: 6 September 1993 (age 33)
- Place of birth: Colombia
- Height: 1.64 m (5 ft 5 in)
- Position: Defender

Senior career*
Years	Team	Apps	(Gls)
2011–2012	Estudiantes F.C.		

International career
2010–2012	Colombia		
- * Club domestic league appearances and goals

Yulieth Paola Domínguez Ochoa (born 6 September 1993) is a Colombian football defender who plays for the Colombia women's national football team. She represented Colombia at the 2011 FIFA Women's World Cup and 2012 Summer Olympics. At the club level, she played for Estudiantes F.C.

== See also ==
- Colombia at the 2012 Summer Olympics
