= Mildrey Pineda =

Colombian footballer (born 1989)

Carolina Pineda
Personal information
- Full name: Mildrey Carolina Pineda Echeverri
- Date of birth: 1 October 1989 (age 37)
- Place of birth: Colombia
- Height: 1.66 m (5 ft 5 1/2 in)
- Position: Midfielder

Team information
- Current team: América de Cali
- Number: 8

Senior career*
Years	Team	Apps	(Gls)
- CD Palmiranas
2017	Atlético Huila		
2018-	América de Cali		

International career^{‡}
2014–2016	Colombia	25	(2)
- * Club domestic league appearances and goals ‡ National team caps and goals as of 23:18, 23 June 2015 (UTC)

Mildrey Carolina Pineda Echeverri (born 1 October 1989) is a Colombian international football player who plays for América de Cali as a midfielder.
