= Bridge Meadow Stadium =

Stadium in Haverfordwest, Wales

Coordinates: 51.809°N 4.967°W

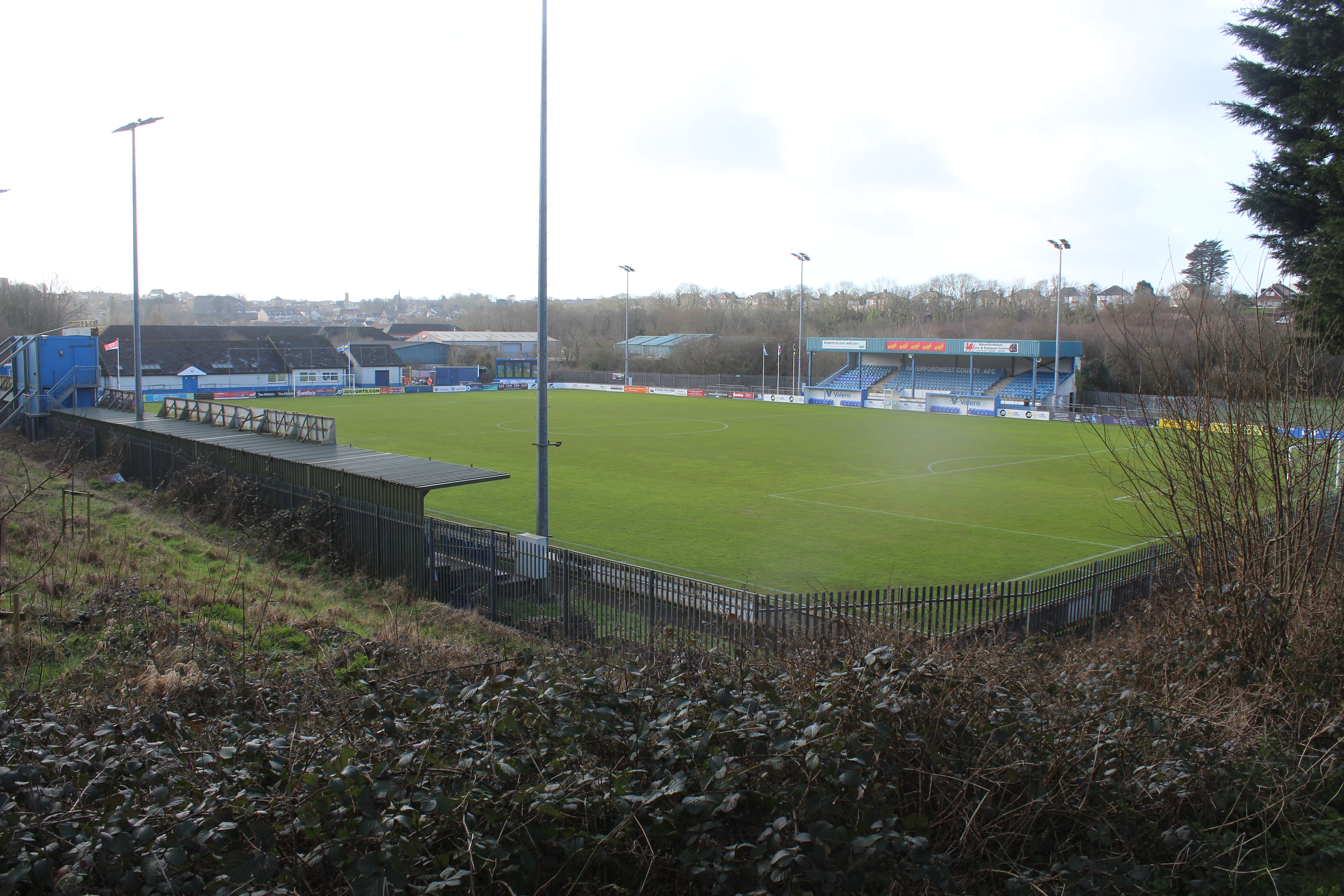
Bridge Meadow stadium in 2024

Bridge Meadow Stadium, also known as the Ogi Bridge Meadow Stadium for sponsorship reasons, is a multi-purpose stadium in Haverfordwest, Wales. It is currently used mostly for football matches and is the home ground of Haverfordwest County A.F.C. The stadium holds 2,467 people.

== History ==
Bridge Meadow Stadium was built in the mid-1990s as the new home venue of Haverfordwest County. In August 2021, the club signed a sponsorship deal with the Welsh Fibre Broadband company Ogi for naming rights at the ground. As a result, the ground was renamed the Ogi Bridge Meadow Stadium. The ground has hosted matches featuring the Wales women's national football team and its youth sides.

== Layout ==
The main area of the ground is the Main Stand which is all-seated, covered stand that runs for most of the length of the pitch. The remaining areas at the side of the stand are used as spectator standing areas. Directly opposite the Main Stand, are two small, all-seated stands that are separated by a press and TV camera gantry.

The club's offices and changing rooms are located at one end of the pitch, known as the Town End. The building has a small standing terrace between it and the pitch. The opposite end of the pitch features a similar, small standing terrace for spectators. There are eight floodlights at the ground, split between four on each side of the pitch.

The away end of the stadium is located at the North of the pitch. Access is gained via Well Lane.
