= Carmen Rodallega =

Colombian footballer (born 1983)

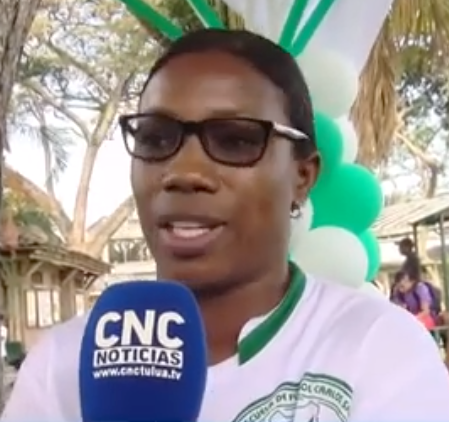
- In a 2018 interview

Personal information
- Full name: Carmen Elisa Rodallega
- Date of birth: 15 July 1983 (age 43)
- Place of birth: Cali, Colombia
- Height: 1.60 m (5 ft 3 in)
- Position: Full back

Team information
- Current team: Atlético Huila
- Number: 4

Senior career*
Years	Team	Apps	(Gls)
2000–20??	Escuela Carlos Sarmiento Lora		
2019–	Atlético Huila		

International career
2010–2012	Colombia	42	(6)
- * Club domestic league appearances and goals

Carmen Elisa Rodallega (born 15 July 1983) is a Colombian footballer who plays as a full back for Atlético Huila. She has been a member of the Colombia women's national team.

== Career ==
Born in Cali, Rodallega began playing football in her neighbourhood and joined Escuela Carlos Sarmiento Lora at age 17.

Rodallega has played as a striker for the senior Colombia women's national football team, featuring as Colombia finished as runners-up in the 2010 Sudamericano Femenino and helping her team qualify for its first ever FIFA Women's World Cup finals.

She also played at the 2012 Olympics. After Colombia were beaten in all three group matches Rodallega criticised a lack of support from the association. She also supported the team's coach over the controversial omission of Yoreli Rincón, stating that Rincón had arrived at the tournament in poor condition.

== Personal life ==
Carmen's cousin Hugo Rodallega played football in England for Wigan and Fulham. She has one daughter.
