= Nataly Arias =

Colombian footballer (born 1986)

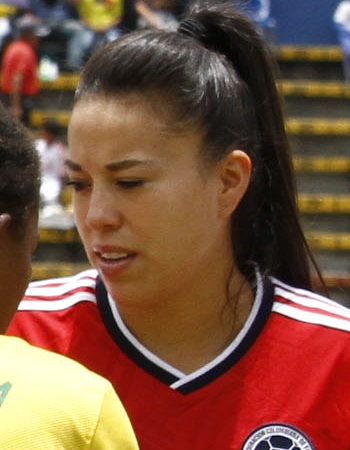
- Arias with Colombia in 2014

Personal information
- Full name: Katherine Nataly Arias Peña
- Date of birth: 2 April 1986 (age 40)
- Place of birth: Arlington County, Virginia, U.S.
- Height: 1.70 m (5 ft 7 in)
- Position: Defender

College career
Years	Team	Apps	(Gls)
2004–2008	Maryland Terrapins		

Senior career*
Years	Team	Apps	(Gls)
- Atlanta Silverbacks Women
- Formas Íntimas

International career^{‡}
2010–2016	Colombia	60	(6)
- * Club domestic league appearances and goals ‡ National team caps and goals as of 9 August 2023

Katherine Nataly Arias Peña (born 2 April 1986) is a Colombian former footballer who played as a center back. She represented Colombia in the 2011 FIFA Women's World Cup in Germany, 2012 Summer Olympics in London, 2015 FIFA Women's World Cup in Canada, and the 2016 Summer Olympics in Brazil.
