= 2015 FIFA Women's World Cup Group F =

Football tournament group stage

Group F of the 2015 FIFA Women's World Cup consisted of France, England, Colombia and Mexico. Matches were played from 9 to 17 June 2015.

== Teams ==
| Draw position | Team | Confederation | Method of qualification | Date of qualification | Finals appearance | Last appearance | Previous best performance | FIFA Rankings at start of event |
|---|---|---|---|---|---|---|---|---|
| F1 (seed) | France | UEFA | UEFA Group 7 winners | 13 September 2014 | 3rd | 2011 | Fourth place (2011) | 3 |
| F2 | England | UEFA | UEFA Group 6 winners | 21 August 2014 | 4th | 2011 | Quarter-finals (1995, 2007, 2011) | 6 |
| F3 | Colombia | CONMEBOL | Copa América Femenina runners-up | 28 September 2014 | 2nd | 2011 | Group stage (2011) | 28 |
| F4 | Mexico | CONCACAF | CONCACAF Women's Championship 3rd place | 26 October 2014 | 3rd | 2011 | Group stage (1999, 2011) | 25 |

== Standings ==
| Pos | Team | Pld | W | D | L | GF | GA | GD | Pts | Qualification |
|---|---|---|---|---|---|---|---|---|---|---|
| 1 | France | 3 | 2 | 0 | 1 | 6 | 2 | +4 | 6 | Advance to knockout stage |
| 2 | England | 3 | 2 | 0 | 1 | 4 | 3 | +1 | 6 | Advance to knockout stage |
| 3 | Colombia | 3 | 1 | 1 | 1 | 4 | 3 | +1 | 4 | Advance to knockout stage |
| 4 | Mexico | 3 | 0 | 1 | 2 | 2 | 8 | −6 | 1 | |

Source: FIFA
Rules for classification: Group stage tiebreakers

In the round of 16:

- France advanced to play South Korea (runner-up of Group E).
- England advanced to play Norway (runner-up of Group B).
- Colombia (as one of the four best third-placed teams) advanced to play United States (winner of Group D).

== Matches ==
=== France vs England ===
9 June 2015
14:00 ADT (UTC−3)

| France | 1–0 | England |
|---|---|---|
| Le Sommer 29' | Report |

Moncton Stadium, Moncton
Attendance: 11,686
Referee: Efthalia Mitsi (Greece)

| France | England |

| GK | 16 | Sarah Bouhaddi |
| RB | 8 | Jessica Houara |
| CB | 4 | Laura Georges |
| CB | 2 | Wendie Renard (c) |
| LB | 3 | Laure Boulleau |
| CM | 6 | Amandine Henry |
| CM | 10 | Camille Abily |
| RW | 12 | Élodie Thomis | (substituted off) 71' |
| LW | 14 | Louisa Nécib | (substituted off) 87' |
| CF | 9 | Eugénie Le Sommer | (substituted off) 81' |
| CF | 17 | Gaëtane Thiney |
Substitutions:
| MF | 7 | Kenza Dali | (substituted on) 71' |
| MF | 15 | Élise Bussaglia | (substituted on) 81' |
| MF | 11 | Claire Lavogez | (substituted on) 87' |
Manager:
Philippe Bergeroo

| GK | 1 | Karen Bardsley |
| RB | 2 | Alex Scott | | (substituted off) 68' |
| CB | 5 | Steph Houghton (c) |
| CB | 6 | Laura Bassett |
| LB | 3 | Claire Rafferty |
| CM | 16 | Katie Chapman | (yellow card) 66' | (substituted off) 76' |
| CM | 4 | Fara Williams |
| RW | 8 | Jill Scott |
| LW | 12 | Lucy Bronze |
| CF | 23 | Ellen White | | (substituted off) 60' |
| CF | 9 | Eniola Aluko |
Substitutions:
| FW | 18 | Toni Duggan | | (substituted on) 60' |
| FW | 22 | Fran Kirby | | (substituted on) 68' |
| MF | 11 | Jade Moore | | (substituted on) 76' |
Manager:
Mark Sampson

Player of the Match:
Eugénie Le Sommer (France)

Assistant referees:
Chrysoula Kourompylia (Greece)
Angela Kyriakou (Cyprus)
Fourth official:
Michelle Pye (Canada)
Fifth official:
Suzanne Morisset (Canada)

=== Colombia vs Mexico ===
9 June 2015
17:00 ADT (UTC−3)

| Colombia | 1–1 | Mexico |
|---|---|---|
| Montoya 82' | Report | V. Pérez 36' |

Moncton Stadium, Moncton
Attendance: 11,686
Referee: Thérèse Neguel (Cameroon)

| Colombia | Mexico |

| GK | 1 | Stefany Castaño |
| RB | 17 | Carolina Arias |
| CB | 13 | Ángela Clavijo |
| CB | 14 | Nataly Arias |
| LB | 9 | Oriánica Velásquez | (yellow card) 34' |
| CM | 3 | Natalia Gaitán (c) | (yellow card) 26' |
| CM | 6 | Daniela Montoya | (yellow card) 55' |
| RW | 4 | Diana Ospina | | (substituted off) 88' |
| AM | 10 | Yoreli Rincón |
| LW | 16 | Lady Andrade | | (substituted off) 77' |
| CF | 11 | Catalina Usme | | (substituted off) 78' |
Substitutions:
| FW | 15 | Tatiana Ariza | | (substituted on) 77' |
| FW | 7 | Ingrid Vidal | | (substituted on) 78' |
| FW | 18 | Yisela Cuesta | | (substituted on) 88' |
Manager:
Fabián Taborda

| GK | 1 | Cecilia Santiago | (yellow card) 18' |
| RB | 2 | Kenti Robles |
| CB | 3 | Christina Murillo |
| CB | 4 | Alina Garciamendez |
| LB | 5 | Valeria Miranda |
| CM | 11 | Mónica Ocampo | | (substituted off) 87' |
| CM | 10 | Stephany Mayor |
| RW | 7 | Nayeli Rangel (c) |
| LW | 17 | Verónica Pérez |
| CF | 9 | Charlyn Corral |
| CF | 19 | Renae Cuéllar | | (substituted off) 79' |
Substitutions:
| MF | 6 | Jennifer Ruiz | | (substituted on) 79' |
| FW | 22 | Fabiola Ibarra | | (substituted on) 87' |
Manager:
Leonardo Cuéllar

Player of the Match:
Nayeli Rangel (Mexico)

Assistant referees:
Ayawa Dzodope (Togo)
Souad Oulhaj (Morocco)
Fourth official:
Ledya Tafesse (Ethiopia)
Fifth official:
Suzanne Morisset (Canada)

=== France vs Colombia ===
13 June 2015
14:00 ADT (UTC−3)

| France | 0–2 | Colombia |
|---|---|---|
| | Report | Andrade 19'; Usme 90+3' |

Moncton Stadium, Moncton
Attendance: 13,138
Referee: Qin Liang (China)

| France | Colombia |

| GK | 16 | Sarah Bouhaddi |
| RB | 8 | Jessica Houara |
| CB | 4 | Laura Georges |
| CB | 2 | Wendie Renard (c) |
| LB | 3 | Laure Boulleau |
| CM | 15 | Élise Bussaglia | (substituted off) 63' |
| CM | 10 | Camille Abily |
| RW | 7 | Kenza Dali | (substituted off) 77' |
| LW | 14 | Louisa Nécib | (substituted off) 63' |
| CF | 9 | Eugénie Le Sommer |
| CF | 17 | Gaëtane Thiney |
Substitutions:
| MF | 6 | Amandine Henry | (substituted on) 63' |
| MF | 11 | Claire Lavogez | (substituted on) 63' |
| FW | 18 | Marie-Laure Delie | (substituted on) 77' |
Manager:
Philippe Bergeroo

| GK | 12 | Sandra Sepúlveda | (yellow card) 69' |
| RB | 17 | Carolina Arias |
| CB | 13 | Ángela Clavijo |
| CB | 14 | Nataly Arias |
| LB | 9 | Oriánica Velásquez |
| CM | 3 | Natalia Gaitán (c) |
| CM | 6 | Daniela Montoya |
| RW | 4 | Diana Ospina | (yellow card) 79' |
| AM | 10 | Yoreli Rincón | | (substituted off) 87' |
| LW | 16 | Lady Andrade | | (substituted off) 90+1' |
| CF | 7 | Ingrid Vidal | | (substituted off) 55' |
Substitutions:
| FW | 11 | Catalina Usme | | (substituted on) 55' |
| MF | 21 | Isabella Echeverri | | (substituted on) 87' |
| FW | 15 | Tatiana Ariza | | (substituted on) 90+1' |
Manager:
Fabián Taborda

Player of the Match:
Lady Andrade (Colombia)

Assistant referees:
Cui Yongmei (China)
Fang Yan (China)
Fourth official:
Michelle Pye (Canada)
Fifth official:
María Rocco (Argentina)

=== England vs Mexico ===
13 June 2015
17:00 ADT (UTC−3)

| England | 2–1 | Mexico |
|---|---|---|
| Kirby 71'; Carney 82' | Report | Ibarra 90+1' |

Moncton Stadium, Moncton
Attendance: 13,138
Referee: Anna-Marie Keighley (New Zealand)

| England | Mexico |

| GK | 1 | Karen Bardsley |
| RB | 12 | Lucy Bronze | | (substituted off) 85' |
| CB | 5 | Steph Houghton (c) |
| CB | 6 | Laura Bassett |
| LB | 3 | Claire Rafferty | | (substituted off) 53' |
| CM | 8 | Jill Scott | | (substituted off) 66' |
| CM | 4 | Fara Williams |
| CM | 11 | Jade Moore |
| RF | 18 | Toni Duggan |
| CF | 9 | Eniola Aluko |
| LF | 22 | Fran Kirby |
Substitutions:
| DF | 14 | Alex Greenwood | | (substituted on) 53' |
| MF | 10 | Karen Carney | (yellow card) 90+2' | (substituted on) 66' |
| DF | 2 | Alex Scott | | (substituted on) 85' |
Manager:
Mark Sampson

| GK | 1 | Cecilia Santiago |
| RB | 2 | Kenti Robles |
| CB | 15 | Bianca Sierra | | (substituted off) 46' |
| CB | 4 | Alina Garciamendez | (yellow card) 64' |
| LB | 6 | Jennifer Ruiz |
| CM | 11 | Mónica Ocampo | | (substituted off) 89' |
| CM | 10 | Stephany Mayor |
| RW | 7 | Nayeli Rangel (c) |
| LW | 17 | Verónica Pérez |
| CF | 9 | Charlyn Corral |
| CF | 19 | Renae Cuéllar | | (substituted off) 77' |
Substitutions:
| DF | 5 | Valeria Miranda | | (substituted on) 46' |
| MF | 20 | Maria Sánchez | | (substituted on) 77' |
| MF | 22 | Fabiola Ibarra | | (substituted on) 89' |
Manager:
Leonardo Cuéllar

Player of the Match:
Fran Kirby (England)

Assistant referees:
Allyson Flynn (Australia)
Lata Kaumatule (Tonga)
Fourth official:
Salomé di Iorio (Argentina)
Fifth official:
María Rocco (Argentina)

=== Mexico vs France ===
17 June 2015
16:00 EDT (UTC−4)

| Mexico | 0–5 | France |
|---|---|---|
| | Report | Delie 1'; Ruiz 9' (o.g.); Le Sommer 13', 36'; Henry 80' |

TD Place Stadium, Ottawa
Attendance: 21,562
Referee: Sachiko Yamagishi (Japan)

| Mexico | France |

| GK | 1 | Cecilia Santiago |
| RB | 2 | Kenti Robles |
| CB | 4 | Alina Garciamendez |
| CB | 13 | Greta Espinoza |
| LB | 5 | Valeria Miranda | (yellow card) 62' |
| CM | 6 | Jennifer Ruiz |
| CM | 10 | Stephany Mayor | | (substituted off) 46' |
| RW | 7 | Nayeli Rangel (c) | | (substituted off) 83' |
| LW | 11 | Mónica Ocampo |
| CF | 17 | Verónica Pérez | (yellow card) 87' |
| CF | 9 | Charlyn Corral | | (substituted off) 46' |
Substitutions:
| DF | 14 | Arianna Romero | | (substituted on) 46' |
| FW | 19 | Renae Cuéllar | | (substituted on) 46' |
| DF | 3 | Christina Murillo | | (substituted on) 83' |
Manager:
Leonardo Cuéllar

| GK | 16 | Sarah Bouhaddi |
| RB | 8 | Jessica Houara |
| CB | 4 | Laura Georges |
| CB | 2 | Wendie Renard (c) |
| LB | 3 | Laure Boulleau | (substituted off) 78' |
| CM | 6 | Amandine Henry |
| CM | 10 | Camille Abily | (substituted off) 70' |
| RW | 12 | Élodie Thomis |
| LW | 22 | Amel Majri |
| CF | 18 | Marie-Laure Delie |
| CF | 9 | Eugénie Le Sommer | (substituted off) 63' |
Substitutions:
| FW | 17 | Gaëtane Thiney | (substituted on) 63' |
| MF | 15 | Élise Bussaglia | (substituted on) 70' |
| DF | 5 | Sabrina Delannoy | (substituted on) 78' |
Manager:
Philippe Bergeroo

Player of the Match:
Amandine Henry (France)

Assistant referees:
Naomi Teshirogi (Japan)
Fang Yan (China)
Fourth official:
Qin Liang (China)
Fifth official:
Cui Yongmei (China)

=== England vs Colombia ===
17 June 2015
16:00 EDT (UTC−4)

| England | 2–1 | Colombia |
|---|---|---|
| Carney 15'; Williams 38' (pen.) | Report | Andrade 90+4' |

Olympic Stadium, Montreal
Attendance: 13,862
Referee: Carol Anne Chenard (Canada)

| England | Colombia |

| GK | 1 | Karen Bardsley |
| RB | 2 | Alex Scott | (yellow card) 65' |
| CB | 5 | Steph Houghton (c) |
| CB | 15 | Casey Stoney |
| LB | 14 | Alex Greenwood |
| DM | 4 | Fara Williams |
| CM | 7 | Jordan Nobbs |
| CM | 11 | Jade Moore |
| AM | 10 | Karen Carney | | (substituted off) 56' |
| CF | 18 | Toni Duggan | | (substituted off) 81' |
| CF | 22 | Fran Kirby | | (substituted off) 66' |
Substitutions:
| FW | 20 | Lianne Sanderson | | (substituted on) 56' |
| MF | 17 | Josanne Potter | | (substituted on) 66' |
| FW | 19 | Jodie Taylor | | (substituted on) 81' |
Manager:
Mark Sampson

| GK | 12 | Sandra Sepúlveda | (yellow card) 85' |
| RB | 17 | Carolina Arias | (yellow card) 37' |
| CB | 14 | Nataly Arias |
| CB | 13 | Ángela Clavijo |
| LB | 9 | Oriánica Velásquez |
| CM | 3 | Natalia Gaitán (c) |
| CM | 6 | Daniela Montoya |
| RW | 11 | Catalina Usme | (yellow card) 36' | (substituted off) 58' |
| AM | 10 | Yoreli Rincón | | (substituted off) 74' |
| LW | 16 | Lady Andrade |
| CF | 4 | Diana Ospina | | (substituted off) 83' |
Substitutions:
| FW | 7 | Ingrid Vidal | | (substituted on) 58' |
| FW | 15 | Tatiana Ariza | | (substituted on) 74' |
| MF | 19 | Leicy Santos | | (substituted on) 83' |
Manager:
Fabián Taborda

Player of the Match:
Fara Williams (England)

Assistant referees:
Marie-Josée Charbonneau (Canada)
Suzanne Morisset (Canada)
Fourth official:
Michelle Pye (Canada)
Fifth official:
Princess Brown (Jamaica)

== See also ==
- Colombia at the FIFA Women's World Cup
- England at the FIFA Women's World Cup
- France at the FIFA Women's World Cup
- Mexico at the FIFA Women's World Cup
