= Football at the 2016 Summer Olympics – Women's tournament – Group G =

Group G of the women's football tournament at the 2016 Summer Olympics was played from 3 to 9 August 2016, and included Colombia, France, New Zealand and United States. The top two teams advanced to the knockout stage, while the third-placed team will also advance if they are among the two best third-placed teams among all three groups.

All times are BRT (UTC−3). For matches in Manaus, which is in AMT (UTC−4), local times are listed in parentheses.

== Teams ==
Draw position	Team	Confederation	Method of qualification	Date of qualification	Olympic appearance	Last appearance	Previous best performance	FIFA Rankings at start of event
G1	United States	CONCACAF	CONCACAF Qualifying 1st place	19 February 2016	6th	2012	Gold medal (1996, 2004, 2008, 2012)	1
G2	New Zealand	OFC	OFC Qualifying 1st place	26 January 2016	3rd	2012	Quarter-finals (2012)	17
G3	France	UEFA	FIFA World Cup 2nd best European team	22 June 2015	2nd	2012	Fourth place (2012)	3
G4	Colombia	CONMEBOL	Copa América 2nd place	28 September 2014	2nd	2012	Group stage (2012)	24

== Standings ==
Pos	Team	Pld	W	D	L	GF	GA	GD	Pts	Qualification
1	United States	3	2	1	0	5	2	+3	7	Quarter-finals
2	France	3	2	0	1	7	1	+6	6	Quarter-finals
3	New Zealand	3	1	0	2	1	5	−4	3	
4	Colombia	3	0	1	2	2	7	−5	1	

Source: Rio2016 & FIFA
Rules for classification: Tiebreakers

== Matches ==
=== United States vs New Zealand ===
3 August 2016
19:00

United States	2–0	New Zealand
Lloyd 9'; Morgan 46'	Report (Rio2016); Report (FIFA)

Mineirão, Belo Horizonte
Attendance: 10,059
Referee: Kateryna Monzul (Ukraine)

United States	New Zealand

GK	1	Hope Solo
DF	4	Becky Sauerbrunn
DF	5	Kelley O'Hara
DF	7	Meghan Klingenberg
DF	8	Julie Johnston
MF	3	Allie Long
MF	10	Carli Lloyd (c)
MF	14	Morgan Brian	(substituted off) 64'
MF	17	Tobin Heath
FW	2	Mallory Pugh	(substituted off) 51'
FW	13	Alex Morgan	(substituted off) 81'
Substitutions:
FW	16	Crystal Dunn	(substituted on) 51'
MF	9	Lindsey Horan	(substituted on) 64'
FW	12	Christen Press	(substituted on) 81'
Manager:
Jill Ellis

GK	1	Erin Nayler
DF	2	Ria Percival	(yellow card) 64'
DF	5	Abby Erceg (c)
DF	6	Rebekah Stott
DF	7	Ali Riley	(yellow card) 30'
MF	4	Katie Duncan		(substituted off) 71'
MF	12	Betsy Hassett	(yellow card) 18'
MF	14	Katie Bowen		(substituted off) 60'
MF	16	Annalie Longo
FW	9	Amber Hearn
FW	17	Hannah Wilkinson		(substituted off) 83'
Substitutions:
FW	10	Sarah Gregorius		(substituted on) 60'
MF	11	Kirsty Yallop		(substituted on) 71'
FW	8	Jasmine Pereira		(substituted on) 83'
Manager:
Tony Readings

Assistant referees:
Nataliya Rachynska (Ukraine)
Sanja Rođak-Karšić (Croatia)
Fourth official:
María Carvajal (Chile)

=== France vs Colombia ===
3 August 2016
22:00

France	4–0	Colombia
C. Arias 2' (o.g.); Le Sommer 14'; Abily 42'; Majri 82'	Report (Rio2016); Report (FIFA)

Mineirão, Belo Horizonte
Attendance: 6,847
Referee: Ri Hyang-ok (North Korea)

France	Colombia

GK	16	Sarah Bouhaddi
DF	2	Griedge Mbock Bathy
DF	3	Wendie Renard (c)
DF	7	Amel Majri	(yellow card) 50'
DF	8	Jessica Houara
MF	6	Amandine Henry
MF	10	Camille Abily		(substituted off) 72'
MF	14	Louisa Necib
MF	15	Élise Bussaglia
FW	9	Eugénie Le Sommer		(substituted off) 75'
FW	13	Kadidiatou Diani		(substituted off) 80'
Substitutions:
MF	11	Claire Lavogez		(substituted on) 72'
FW	18	Marie-Laure Delie		(substituted on) 75'
FW	12	Élodie Thomis		(substituted on) 80'
Manager:
Philippe Bergeroo

GK	18	Sandra Sepúlveda
DF	6	Liana Salazar
DF	9	Oriánica Velásquez
DF	13	Angela Clavijo
DF	14	Nataly Arias
DF	17	Carolina Arias
MF	3	Natalia Gaitán (c)
MF	4	Diana Ospina		(substituted off) 67'
MF	10	Leicy Santos		(substituted off) 89'
MF	11	Catalina Usme
FW	16	Lady Andrade		(substituted off) 76'
Substitutions:
FW	7	Ingrid Vidal	(yellow card) 71'	(substituted on) 67'
MF	15	Tatiana Ariza		(substituted on) 76'
DF	8	Mildrey Pineda		(substituted on) 89'
Manager:
Felipe Taborda

Assistant referees:
Hong Kum-nyo (North Korea)
Allyson Flynn (Australia)
Fourth official:
Melissa Borjas (Honduras)

=== United States vs France ===
6 August 2016
17:00

United States	1–0	France
Lloyd 64'	Report (Rio2016); Report (FIFA)

Mineirão, Belo Horizonte
Attendance: 11,782
Referee: Claudia Umpierrez (Uruguay)

United States	France

GK	1	Hope Solo
DF	4	Becky Sauerbrunn
DF	5	Kelley O'Hara
DF	6	Whitney Engen
DF	7	Meghan Klingenberg		(substituted off) 90'
MF	3	Allie Long
MF	10	Carli Lloyd (c)		(substituted off) 82'
MF	14	Morgan Brian
MF	17	Tobin Heath
FW	13	Alex Morgan
FW	16	Crystal Dunn	(yellow card) 67'	(substituted off) 70'
Substitutions:
FW	11	Ali Krieger		(substituted on) 70'
MF	9	Lindsey Horan		(substituted on) 82'
FW	12	Christen Press		(substituted on) 90'
Manager:
Jill Ellis

GK	16	Sarah Bouhaddi
DF	2	Griedge Mbock Bathy	(yellow card) 80'
DF	3	Wendie Renard (c)
DF	7	Amel Majri
DF	8	Jessica Houara
MF	6	Amandine Henry
MF	10	Camille Abily		(substituted off) 82'
MF	14	Louisa Necib		(substituted off) 70'
MF	15	Élise Bussaglia
FW	13	Kadidiatou Diani
FW	18	Marie-Laure Delie		(substituted off) 86'
Substitutions:
FW	12	Élodie Thomis		(substituted on) 70'
MF	17	Kheira Hamraoui		(substituted on) 82'
MF	11	Claire Lavogez		(substituted on) 86'
Manager:
Philippe Bergeroo

Assistant referees:
Loreto Toloza (Chile)
Neuza Back (Brazil)
Fourth official:
María Carvajal (Chile)

=== Colombia vs New Zealand ===
6 August 2016
20:00

Colombia	0–1	New Zealand
	Report (Rio2016); Report (FIFA)	Hearn 31'

Mineirão, Belo Horizonte
Attendance: 8,505
Referee: Gladys Lengwe (Zambia)

Colombia	New Zealand

GK	18	Sandra Sepúlveda
DF	6	Liana Salazar	(yellow card) 21'	(substituted off) 89'
DF	9	Oriánica Velásquez
DF	13	Angela Clavijo
DF	14	Nataly Arias
DF	17	Carolina Arias
MF	3	Natalia Gaitán (c)
MF	4	Diana Ospina		(substituted off) 79'
MF	10	Leicy Santos
MF	11	Catalina Usme
FW	16	Lady Andrade		(substituted off) 73'
Substitutions:
MF	15	Tatiana Ariza		(substituted on) 73'
FW	7	Ingrid Vidal		(substituted on) 79'
FW	12	Nicole Regnier		(substituted on) 89'
Manager:
Felipe Taborda

GK	1	Erin Nayler
DF	2	Ria Percival
DF	5	Abby Erceg (c)	(red card) 88'
DF	6	Rebekah Stott
DF	7	Ali Riley
MF	4	Katie Duncan	(yellow card) 45'
MF	12	Betsy Hassett
MF	16	Annalie Longo
FW	9	Amber Hearn
FW	10	Sarah Gregorius		(substituted off) 57'
FW	17	Hannah Wilkinson	(yellow card) 26'	(substituted off) 62'
Substitutions:
MF	14	Katie Bowen		(substituted on) 57'
FW	13	Rosie White	(substituted on) 62'	(substituted off) 90'
DF	15	Meikayla Moore		(substituted on) 90'
Manager:
Tony Readings

Assistant referees:
Bernadettar Kwimbira (Malawi)
Souad Oulhaj (Morocco)
Fourth official:
Melissa Borjas (Honduras)

=== Colombia vs United States ===
9 August 2016
19:00 (18:00 UTC–4)

Colombia	2–2	United States
Usme 26', 90'	Report (Rio2016); Report (FIFA)	Dunn 41'; Pugh 59'

Arena da Amazônia, Manaus
Attendance: 30,557
Referee: Teodora Albon (Romania)

Colombia	United States

GK	18	Sandra Sepúlveda
DF	6	Liana Salazar	(yellow card) 72'
DF	9	Oriánica Velásquez		(substituted off) 46'
DF	13	Angela Clavijo
DF	14	Nataly Arias
DF	17	Carolina Arias
MF	3	Natalia Gaitán (c)	(yellow card) 88'
MF	10	Leicy Santos
MF	11	Catalina Usme
MF	15	Tatiana Ariza		(substituted off) 80'
FW	16	Lady Andrade		(substituted off) 62'
Substitutions:
DF	5	Isabella Echeverri		(substituted on) 46'
MF	4	Diana Ospina		(substituted on) 62'
FW	7	Ingrid Vidal		(substituted on) 80'
Manager:
Felipe Taborda

GK	1	Hope Solo
DF	4	Becky Sauerbrunn
DF	5	Kelley O'Hara
DF	6	Whitney Engen
DF	11	Ali Krieger	(yellow card) 86'
MF	9	Lindsey Horan
MF	10	Carli Lloyd (c)		(substituted off) 46'
MF	14	Morgan Brian		(substituted off) 65'
MF	15	Megan Rapinoe		(substituted off) 33'
FW	12	Christen Press
FW	16	Crystal Dunn
Substitutions:
FW	2	Mallory Pugh		(substituted on) 33'
FW	13	Alex Morgan		(substituted on) 46'
MF	3	Allie Long		(substituted on) 65'
Manager:
Jill Ellis

Assistant referees:
Petruța Iugulescu (Romania)
Mária Súkeníková (Slovakia)
Fourth official:
Melissa Borjas (Honduras)

=== New Zealand vs France ===
9 August 2016
19:00

New Zealand	0–3	France
	Report (Rio2016); Report (FIFA)	Le Sommer 38'; Cadamuro 63', 90+2' (pen.)

Itaipava Arena Fonte Nova, Salvador
Attendance: 7,350
Referee: Lucila Venegas (Mexico)

New Zealand	France

GK	1	Erin Nayler
DF	2	Ria Percival
DF	5	Abby Erceg (c)
DF	6	Rebekah Stott
DF	7	Ali Riley	(yellow card) 90+1'
MF	4	Katie Duncan
MF	12	Betsy Hassett		(substituted off) 60'
MF	14	Katie Bowen		(substituted off) 78'
MF	16	Annalie Longo
FW	9	Amber Hearn
FW	17	Hannah Wilkinson		(substituted off) 71'
Substitutions:
FW	10	Sarah Gregorius		(substituted on) 60'
FW	13	Rosie White		(substituted on) 71'
FW	8	Jasmine Pereira	(yellow card) 83'	(substituted on) 78'
Manager:
Tony Readings

GK	16	Sarah Bouhaddi
DF	3	Wendie Renard (c)
DF	4	Sakina Karchaoui
DF	5	Sabrina Delannoy
DF	8	Jessica Houara
MF	6	Amandine Henry	(substituted off) 72'
MF	11	Claire Lavogez
MF	14	Louisa Necib
MF	15	Élise Bussaglia	(substituted off) 67'
FW	12	Élodie Thomis
FW	18	Marie-Laure Delie	(substituted off) 35'
Substitutions:
FW	9	Eugénie Le Sommer	(substituted on) 35'
MF	10	Camille Abily	(substituted on) 67'
MF	17	Kheira Hamraoui	(substituted on) 72'
Manager:
Philippe Bergeroo

Assistant referees:
Mayte Chávez (Mexico)
Enedina Caudillo (Mexico)
Fourth official:
Rita Gani (Malaysia)
