= 2015 FIFA Women's World Cup knockout stage =

Football tournament knockout stage

The knockout stage of the 2015 FIFA Women's World Cup began on 20 June and ended with the final match on 5 July 2015. A total of 16 teams competed in this knockout stage.

== Format ==
The knockout stage comprises the 16 teams that advanced from the group stage of the tournament. There are four rounds of matches, with each round eliminating half of the teams entering that round. The successive rounds are the round of 16, quarter-finals, semi-finals, and the final. There is also a match to decide third and fourth place. For each game in the knockout stage, any draw at 90 minutes is followed by 30 minutes of extra time; if scores are still level, there is a penalty shootout to determine who progresses to the next round. Single yellow cards accrued will be cancelled after the quarter-finals, therefore ensuring that no players miss the Final because of receiving a caution in the semi-finals.

=== Combinations of matches in the round of 16 ===
The third-placed teams which advanced will be placed with the winners of groups A, B, C, and D according to a table of 15 possible combinations published in Section 28 of the tournament regulations.

Combination used according to the four qualified teams

Third teams qualify from groups:	Canada (1A) plays vs.:	Germany (1B) plays vs.:	Japan (1C) plays vs.:	USA (1D) plays vs.:
A B C D	3C	3D	3A	3B
A B C E	3C	3A	3B	3E
A B C F	3C	3A	3B	3F
A B D E	3D	3A	3B	3E
A B D F	3D	3A	3B	3F
A B E F	3E	3A	3B	3F
A C D E	3C	3D	3A	3E
A C D F	3C	3D	3A	3F
A C E F	3C	3A	3F	3E
A D E F	3D	3A	3F	3E
B C D E	3C	3D	3B	3E
B C D F	3C	3D	3B	3F
B C E F	3E	3C	3B	3F
B D E F	3E	3D	3B	3F
C D E F	3C	3D	3F	3E

== Qualified teams ==
The top two teams of each preliminary group and the four best-ranked third place teams advanced to the knockout stage.

Group	Winners	Runners-up	Third place (Best four qualified)
A	Canada	China	Netherlands
B	Germany	Norway	—N/a
C	Japan	Cameroon	Switzerland
D	United States	Australia	Sweden
E	Brazil	South Korea	—N/a
F	France	England	Colombia

== Bracket ==
Round of 16
20 June – Edmonton
China	1
Cameroon	0
22 June – Edmonton
United States	2
Colombia	0
20 June – Ottawa
Germany	4
Sweden	1
21 June – Montreal
France	3
South Korea	0
21 June – Moncton
Brazil	0
Australia	1
23 June – Vancouver
Japan	2
Netherlands	1
22 June – Ottawa
Norway	1
England	2
21 June – Vancouver
Canada	1
Switzerland	0

Quarter-finals
26 June – Ottawa
China	0
United States	1
26 June – Montreal
Germany (p)	1 (5)
France	1 (4)
27 June – Edmonton
Australia	0
Japan	1
27 June – Vancouver
England	2
Canada	1

Semi-finals
30 June – Montreal
United States	2
Germany	0
1 July – Edmonton
Japan	2
England	1

Final
5 July – Vancouver
United States	5
Japan	2
Third place play-off
4 July – Edmonton
Germany	0
England (a.e.t.)	1

== Round of 16 ==
=== Germany vs Sweden ===
20 June 2015
16:00 EDT (UTC−4)

Germany	4–1	Sweden
Mittag 24'; Šašić 36' (pen.), 78'; Marozsán 88'	Report	Sembrant 82'

TD Place Stadium, Ottawa
Attendance: 22,486
Referee: Ri Hyang-ok (North Korea)

Germany	Sweden

GK	1	Nadine Angerer (c)
RB	4	Leonie Maier
CB	5	Annike Krahn
CB	3	Saskia Bartusiak	(yellow card) 28'
LB	22	Tabea Kemme		(substituted off) 77'
CM	20	Lena Goeßling
CM	16	Melanie Leupolz		(substituted off) 46'
RW	6	Simone Laudehr
AM	11	Anja Mittag
LW	18	Alexandra Popp		(substituted off) 89'
CF	13	Célia Šašić
Substitutions:
MF	10	Dzsenifer Marozsán		(substituted on) 46'
DF	15	Jennifer Cramer		(substituted on) 77'
MF	9	Lena Lotzen		(substituted on) 89'
Manager:
Silvia Neid

GK	1	Hedvig Lindahl
RB	4	Emma Berglund		(substituted off) 80'
CB	14	Amanda Ilestedt	(yellow card) 35'
CB	5	Nilla Fischer
LB	18	Jessica Samuelsson		(substituted off) 46'
CM	3	Linda Sembrant
CM	17	Caroline Seger (c)
RW	23	Elin Rubensson		(substituted off) 67'
LW	15	Therese Sjögran
CF	8	Lotta Schelin	(yellow card) 68'
CF	10	Sofia Jakobsson
Substitutions:
DF	16	Lina Nilsson		(substituted on) 46'
FW	9	Kosovare Asllani		(substituted on) 67'
FW	11	Jenny Hjohlman		(substituted on) 80'
Manager:
Pia Sundhage

Player of the Match:
Anja Mittag (Germany)

Assistant referees:
Hong Kum-nyo (North Korea)
Widiya Shamsuri (Malaysia)
Fourth official:
Carina Vitulano (Italy)
Fifth official:
Fang Yan (China)

=== China vs Cameroon ===
20 June 2015
17:30 MDT (UTC−6)

China	1–0	Cameroon
Wang Shanshan 12'	Report

Commonwealth Stadium, Edmonton
Attendance: 15,958
Referee: Bibiana Steinhaus (Germany)

China	Cameroon

GK	12	Wang Fei
RB	5	Wu Haiyan (c)
CB	14	Zhao Rong
CB	6	Li Dongna
LB	2	Liu Shanshan
CM	19	Tan Ruyin
CM	23	Ren Guixin
RW	21	Wang Lisi	(substituted off) 72'
AM	13	Tang Jiali	(substituted off) 40'
LW	18	Han Peng
CF	9	Wang Shanshan	(substituted off) 90+1'
Substitutions:
FW	11	Wang Shuang	(substituted on) 40'
MF	16	Lou Jiahui	(substituted on) 72'
FW	17	Gu Yasha	(substituted on) 90+1'
Assistant Coach:
Chang Weiwei

GK	1	Annette Ngo Ndom
RB	12	Claudine Meffometou	(yellow card) 90+3'
CB	2	Christine Manie (c)
CB	11	Aurelle Awona
LB	4	Yvonne Leuko
CM	10	Jeannette Yango
CM	8	Raissa Feudjio
RW	7	Gabrielle Onguéné
AM	6	Francine Zouga		(substituted off) 64'
LW	17	Gaëlle Enganamouit
CF	9	Madeleine Ngono Mani		(substituted off) 74'
Substitutions:
FW	3	Ajara Nchout		(substituted on) 64'
MF	18	Henriette Akaba		(substituted on) 74'
Manager:
Ngachu Enow

Player of the Match:
Ren Guixin (China)

Assistant referees:
Katrin Rafalski (Germany)
Marina Wozniak (Germany)
Fourth official:
Rita Gani (Malaysia)
Fifth official:
Sarah Ho (Australia)

=== Brazil vs Australia ===
21 June 2015
14:00 ADT (UTC−3)

Brazil	0–1	Australia
	Report	Simon 80'

Moncton Stadium, Moncton
Attendance: 12,054
Referee: Teodora Albon (Romania)

Brazil	Australia

GK	1	Luciana
RB	2	Fabiana	(yellow card) 14'
CB	3	Mônica Alves
CB	16	Rafaelle Souza
LB	6	Tamires		(substituted off) 83'
CM	20	Formiga
CM	8	Thaísa Moreno		(substituted off) 83'
RW	10	Marta (c)	(yellow card) 81'
AM	5	Andressinha
LW	9	Andressa Alves
CF	11	Cristiane
Substitutions:
MF	7	Bia Zaneratto		(substituted on) 83'
FW	18	Raquel Fernandes		(substituted on) 83'
Manager:
Vadão

GK	1	Lydia Williams
CB	5	Laura Alleway
CB	14	Alanna Kennedy
CB	7	Stephanie Catley
DM	8	Elise Kellond-Knight
CM	10	Emily van Egmond
CM	13	Tameka Butt	(substituted off) 72'
RW	11	Lisa De Vanna (c)
LW	9	Caitlin Foord
CF	23	Michelle Heyman	(substituted off) 64'
CF	20	Samantha Kerr
Substitutions:
FW	17	Kyah Simon	(substituted on) 64'
MF	19	Katrina Gorry	(substituted on) 72'
Manager:
Alen Stajcic

Player of the Match:
Elise Kellond-Knight (Australia)

Assistant referees:
Petruța Iugulescu (Romania)
Mária Súkeníková (Slovakia)
Fourth official:
Therese Neguel (Cameroon)
Fifth official:
Mana Dzodope (Togo)

=== France vs South Korea ===
21 June 2015
16:00 EDT (UTC−4)

France	3–0	South Korea
Delie 4', 48'; Thomis 8'	Report

Olympic Stadium, Montreal
Attendance: 15,518
Referee: Salomé di Iorio (Argentina)

France	South Korea

GK	16	Sarah Bouhaddi
RB	8	Jessica Houara
CB	4	Laura Georges
CB	2	Wendie Renard (c)
LB	3	Laure Boulleau
CM	6	Amandine Henry
CM	10	Camille Abily		(substituted off) 77'
RW	12	Élodie Thomis
LW	14	Louisa Nécib
CF	18	Marie-Laure Delie		(substituted off) 84'
CF	9	Eugénie Le Sommer		(substituted off) 74'
Substitutions:
FW	17	Gaëtane Thiney		(substituted on) 74'
MF	23	Kheira Hamraoui	(yellow card) 80'	(substituted on) 77'
FW	13	Kadidiatou Diani		(substituted on) 84'
Manager:
Philippe Bergeroo

GK	18	Kim Jung-mi
RB	19	Kim Soo-yun
CB	4	Shim Seo-yeon
CB	5	Kim Do-yeon
LB	2	Lee Eun-mi	(yellow card) 33'
CM	13	Kwon Hah-nul		(substituted off) 60'
CM	8	Cho So-hyun (c)
RW	16	Kang Yu-mi		(substituted off) 78'
AM	23	Lee Geum-min	(yellow card) 85'
LW	7	Jeon Ga-eul
CF	9	Park Eun-sun		(substituted off) 55'
Substitutions:
FW	12	Yoo Young-a		(substituted on) 55'
MF	22	Lee So-dam		(substituted on) 60'
MF	15	Park Hee-young		(substituted on) 78'
Manager:
Yoon Deok-yeo

Player of the Match:
Amandine Henry (France)

Assistant referees:
Maria Rocco (Argentina)
Mariana de Almeida (Argentina)
Fourth official:
Olga Miranda (Paraguay)
Fifth official:
Elizabeth Aguilar (El Salvador)

=== Canada vs Switzerland ===
21 June 2015
16:30 PDT (UTC−7)

Canada	1–0	Switzerland
Bélanger 52'	Report

BC Place, Vancouver
Attendance: 53,855
Referee: Anna-Marie Keighley (New Zealand)

Canada	Switzerland

GK	1	Erin McLeod
RB	7	Rhian Wilkinson		(substituted off) 88'
CB	3	Kadeisha Buchanan	(yellow card) 74'
CB	10	Lauren Sesselmann
LB	15	Allysha Chapman
CM	22	Ashley Lawrence		(substituted off) 76'
CM	11	Desiree Scott
CM	13	Sophie Schmidt
RF	14	Melissa Tancredi		(substituted off) 69'
CF	9	Josée Bélanger
LF	12	Christine Sinclair (c)	(yellow card) 13'
Substitutions:
FW	16	Jonelle Filigno		(substituted on) 69'
MF	6	Kaylyn Kyle		(substituted on) 76'
DF	20	Marie-Ève Nault		(substituted on) 88'
Manager:
John Herdman

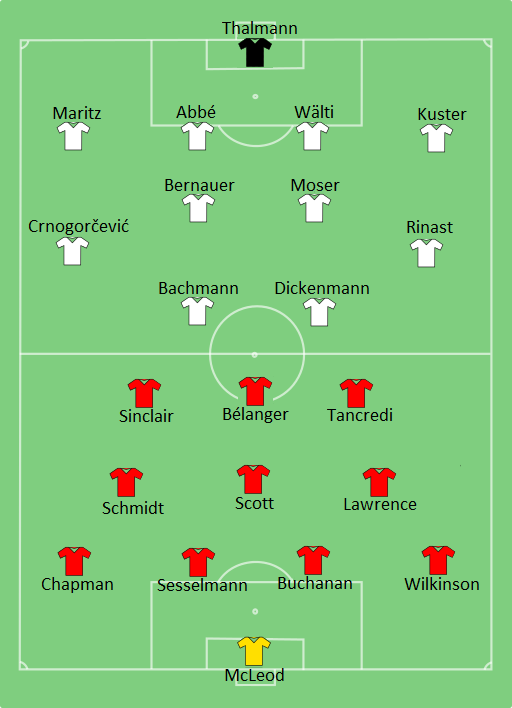

GK	1	Gaëlle Thalmann
RB	5	Noelle Maritz
CB	15	Caroline Abbé (c)
CB	9	Lia Wälti
LB	6	Selina Kuster	(yellow card) 46'	(substituted off) 61'
CM	22	Vanessa Bernauer
CM	7	Martina Moser		(substituted off) 72'
RW	13	Ana-Maria Crnogorčević
LW	4	Rachel Rinast		(substituted off) 80'
CF	10	Ramona Bachmann
CF	11	Lara Dickenmann
Substitutions:
MF	18	Vanessa Bürki		(substituted on) 61'
FW	16	Fabienne Humm		(substituted on) 72'
DF	14	Rahel Kiwic		(substituted on) 80'
Manager:
Martina Voss-Tecklenburg

Player of the Match:
Erin McLeod (Canada)

Assistant referees:
Sarah Walker (New Zealand)
Allyson Flynn (Australia)
Fourth official:
Gladys Lengwe (Zambia)
Fifth official:
Lidwine Rakotozafinoro (Madagascar)

=== Norway vs England ===
22 June 2015
17:00 EDT (UTC−4)

Norway	1–2	England
Gulbrandsen 54'	Report	Houghton 61'; Bronze 76'

TD Place Stadium, Ottawa
Attendance: 19,829
Referee: Esther Staubli (Switzerland)

Norway	England

GK	1	Ingrid Hjelmseth
RB	6	Maren Mjelde
CB	7	Trine Rønning (c)	(substituted off) 46'
CB	3	Marita Skammelsrud Lund
LB	13	Ingrid Moe Wold	(substituted off) 87'
CM	8	Solveig Gulbrandsen
CM	17	Lene Mykjåland
CM	4	Gry Tofte Ims
RF	19	Kristine Minde	(substituted off) 70'
CF	9	Isabell Herlovsen
LF	21	Ada Hegerberg
Substitutions:
DF	2	Maria Thorisdottir	(substituted on) 46'
FW	16	Elise Thorsnes	(substituted on) 70'
FW	5	Lisa-Marie Karlseng Utland	(substituted on) 87'
Manager:
Even Pellerud

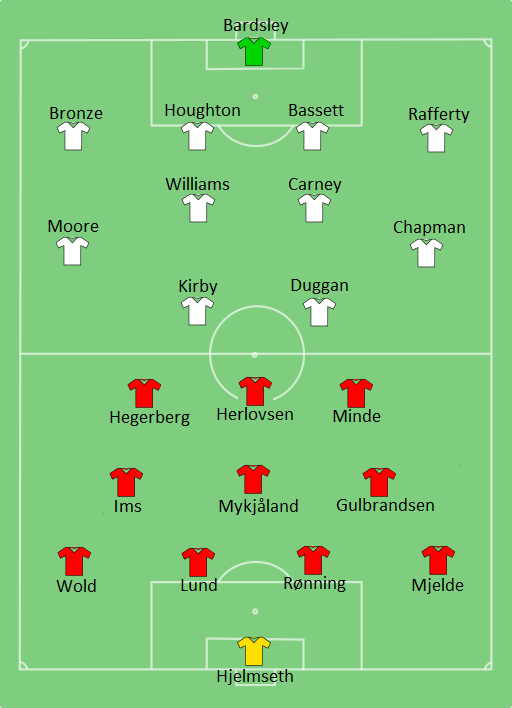

GK	1	Karen Bardsley
RB	12	Lucy Bronze
CB	5	Steph Houghton (c)
CB	6	Laura Bassett
LB	3	Claire Rafferty
CM	4	Fara Williams
CM	10	Karen Carney
RW	11	Jade Moore
LW	16	Katie Chapman
CF	22	Fran Kirby	(substituted off) 54'
CF	18	Toni Duggan	(substituted off) 63'
Substitutions:
MF	8	Jill Scott	(substituted on) 54'
FW	19	Jodie Taylor	(substituted on) 63'
Manager:
Mark Sampson

Player of the Match:
Karen Bardsley (England)

Assistant referees:
Ella de Vries (Belgium)
Lucie Ratajová (Czech Republic)
Fourth official:
Efthalia Mitsi (Greece)
Fifth official:
Chrysoula Kourompylia (Greece)

=== United States vs Colombia ===
22 June 2015
18:00 MDT (UTC−6)

United States	2–0	Colombia
Morgan 53'; Lloyd 66' (pen.)	Report

Commonwealth Stadium, Edmonton
Attendance: 19,412
Referee: Stéphanie Frappart (France)

United States	Colombia

GK	1	Hope Solo
RB	11	Ali Krieger		(substituted off) 81'
CB	4	Becky Sauerbrunn
CB	19	Julie Johnston
LB	22	Meghan Klingenberg
CM	12	Lauren Holiday	(yellow card) 17'
CM	10	Carli Lloyd
RW	15	Megan Rapinoe	(yellow card) 41'	(substituted off) 75'
LW	17	Tobin Heath
CF	20	Abby Wambach (c)		(substituted off) 69'
CF	13	Alex Morgan
Substitutions:
MF	14	Morgan Brian		(substituted on) 69'
FW	23	Christen Press		(substituted on) 75'
DF	16	Lori Chalupny		(substituted on) 81'
Manager:
Jill Ellis

GK	22	Catalina Pérez	(red card) 47'
RB	17	Carolina Arias
CB	14	Nataly Arias
CB	13	Ángela Clavijo	(yellow card) 65'
LB	9	Oriánica Velásquez
CM	6	Daniela Montoya		(substituted off) 85'
CM	3	Natalia Gaitán (c)
RW	4	Diana Ospina
AM	10	Yoreli Rincón		(substituted off) 72'
LW	16	Lady Andrade
CF	7	Ingrid Vidal		(substituted off) 49'
Substitutions:
GK	1	Stefany Castaño		(substituted on) 49'
FW	11	Catalina Usme		(substituted on) 72'
MF	19	Leicy Santos		(substituted on) 85'
Manager:
Fabián Taborda

Player of the Match:
Carli Lloyd (United States)

Assistant referees:
Manuela Nicolosi (France)
Yolanda Parga (Spain)
Fourth official:
Abirami Naidu (Singapore)
Fifth official:
Sarah Ho (Australia)

=== Japan vs Netherlands ===
23 June 2015
19:00 PDT (UTC−7)

Japan	2–1	Netherlands
Ariyoshi 10'; Sakaguchi 78'	Report	Van de Ven 90+2'

BC Place, Vancouver
Attendance: 28,717
Referee: Lucila Venegas (Mexico)

Japan	Netherlands

GK	18	Ayumi Kaihori
RB	19	Saori Ariyoshi	(yellow card) 50'
CB	3	Azusa Iwashimizu
CB	4	Saki Kumagai
LB	5	Aya Sameshima
CM	6	Mizuho Sakaguchi
CM	13	Rumi Utsugi
RW	9	Nahomi Kawasumi		(substituted off) 80'
LW	8	Aya Miyama (c)
CF	17	Yūki Ōgimi
CF	11	Shinobu Ohno		(substituted off) 66'
Substitutions:
FW	16	Mana Iwabuchi		(substituted on) 66'
MF	10	Homare Sawa		(substituted on) 80'
Manager:
Norio Sasaki

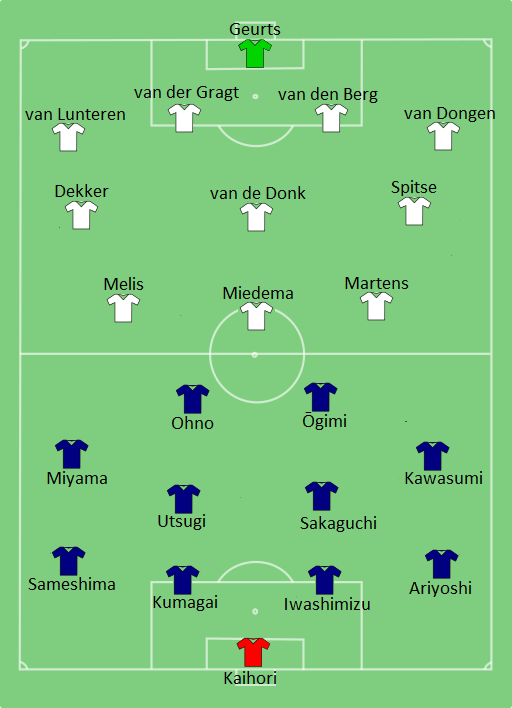

GK	1	Loes Geurts
RB	2	Desiree van Lunteren
CB	3	Stefanie van der Gragt
CB	4	Mandy van den Berg (c)
LB	15	Merel van Dongen	(substituted off) 86'
CM	6	Anouk Dekker
CM	10	Daniëlle van de Donk	(substituted off) 53'
CM	8	Sherida Spitse
RF	7	Manon Melis
CF	9	Vivianne Miedema
LF	11	Lieke Martens
Substitutions:
FW	19	Kirsten van de Ven	(substituted on) 53'
MF	17	Tessel Middag	(substituted on) 86'
Manager:
Roger Reijners

Player of the Match:
Mizuho Sakaguchi (Japan)

Assistant referees:
Mayte Chávez (Mexico)
Enedina Caudillo (Mexico)
Fourth official:
Claudia Umpierrez (Uruguay)
Fifth official:
Luciana Mascaraña (Uruguay)

== Quarter-finals ==
=== Germany vs France ===
26 June 2015
16:00 EDT (UTC−4)

Germany	1–1 (a.e.t.)	France
Šašić 84' (pen.)	Report	Nécib 64'
Penalties
Behringer (penalty scored); Laudehr (penalty scored); Peter (penalty scored); Marozsán (penalty scored); Šašić (penalty scored)	5–4	(penalty scored) Thiney; (penalty scored) Abily; (penalty scored) Nécib; (penalty scored) Renard; (penalty missed) Lavogez

Olympic Stadium, Montreal
Attendance: 24,859
Referee: Carol Anne Chenard (Canada)

Germany	France

GK	1	Nadine Angerer (c)
RB	4	Leonie Maier
CB	5	Annike Krahn
CB	14	Babett Peter
LB	22	Tabea Kemme
CM	20	Lena Goeßling	(yellow card) 68'	(substituted off) 79'
CM	16	Melanie Leupolz	(yellow card) 91'
RW	6	Simone Laudehr
AM	11	Anja Mittag	(yellow card) 37'	(substituted off) 46'
LW	18	Alexandra Popp		(substituted off) 70'
CF	13	Célia Šašić
Substitutions:
MF	10	Dzsenifer Marozsán	(yellow card) 68'	(substituted on) 46'
MF	23	Sara Däbritz		(substituted on) 70'
MF	7	Melanie Behringer		(substituted on) 79'
Manager:
Silvia Neid

GK	16	Sarah Bouhaddi
RB	8	Jessica Houara
CB	4	Laura Georges	(yellow card) 57'
CB	2	Wendie Renard (c)
LB	22	Amel Majri
CM	6	Amandine Henry
CM	10	Camille Abily
RW	12	Élodie Thomis		(substituted off) 69'
LW	14	Louisa Nécib
CF	18	Marie-Laure Delie	(yellow card) 55'	(substituted off) 101'
CF	9	Eugénie Le Sommer		(substituted off) 91'
Substitutions:
MF	11	Claire Lavogez		(substituted on) 69'
FW	17	Gaëtane Thiney		(substituted on) 91'
MF	23	Kheira Hamraoui		(substituted on) 101'
Manager:
Philippe Bergeroo

Player of the Match:
Nadine Angerer (Germany)

Assistant referees:
Marie-Josée Charbonneau (Canada)
Suzanne Morisset (Canada)
Fourth official:
Efthalia Mitsi (Greece)
Fifth official:
Chrysoula Kourompylia (Greece)

=== China vs United States ===
26 June 2015
19:30 EDT (UTC−4)

China	0–1	United States
	Report	Lloyd 51'

TD Place Stadium, Ottawa
Attendance: 24,141
Referee: Carina Vitulano (Italy)

China	United States

GK	12	Wang Fei
RB	5	Wu Haiyan (c)	(yellow card) 50'
CB	14	Zhao Rong
CB	6	Li Dongna
LB	2	Liu Shanshan
CM	19	Tan Ruyin		(substituted off) 58'
CM	23	Ren Guixin
RW	21	Wang Lisi
AM	16	Lou Jiahui		(substituted off) 35'
LW	18	Han Peng		(substituted off) 74'
CF	9	Wang Shanshan
Substitutions:
FW	11	Wang Shuang		(substituted on) 35'
DF	3	Pang Fengyue		(substituted on) 58'
MF	13	Tang Jiali		(substituted on) 74'
Manager:
Hao Wei

GK	1	Hope Solo
RB	11	Ali Krieger
CB	19	Julie Johnston
CB	4	Becky Sauerbrunn
LB	22	Meghan Klingenberg
CM	14	Morgan Brian
CM	10	Carli Lloyd (c)
RW	5	Kelley O'Hara	(substituted off) 61'
LW	17	Tobin Heath
CF	8	Amy Rodriguez	(substituted off) 86'
CF	13	Alex Morgan	(substituted off) 81'
Substitutions:
FW	23	Christen Press	(substituted on) 61'
MF	9	Heather O'Reilly	(substituted on) 81'
MF	20	Abby Wambach	(substituted on) 86'
Manager:
Jill Ellis

Player of the Match:
Carli Lloyd (United States)

Assistant referees:
Michelle O'Neill (Republic of Ireland)
Tonja Paavola (Finland)
Fourth official:
Salomé di Iorio (Argentina)
Fifth official:
María Rocco (Argentina)

=== Australia vs Japan ===
27 June 2015
14:00 MDT (UTC−6)

Australia	0–1	Japan
	Report	Iwabuchi 87'

Commonwealth Stadium, Edmonton
Attendance: 19,814
Referee: Kateryna Monzul (Ukraine)

Australia	Japan

GK	1	Lydia Williams
CB	5	Laura Alleway
CB	14	Alanna Kennedy
CB	7	Stephanie Catley
DM	8	Elise Kellond-Knight
CM	10	Emily van Egmond
CM	19	Katrina Gorry	(substituted off) 76'
RW	17	Kyah Simon	(substituted off) 89'
LW	9	Caitlin Foord
CF	11	Lisa De Vanna (c)	(substituted off) 67'
CF	20	Samantha Kerr
Substitutions:
FW	2	Larissa Crummer	(substituted on) 67'
FW	23	Michelle Heyman	(substituted on) 76'
FW	3	Ashleigh Sykes	(substituted on) 89'
Manager:
Alen Stajcic

GK	18	Ayumi Kaihori
RB	19	Saori Ariyoshi
CB	3	Azusa Iwashimizu	(yellow card) 27'
CB	4	Saki Kumagai
LB	5	Aya Sameshima
CM	6	Mizuho Sakaguchi		(substituted off) 90'
CM	13	Rumi Utsugi
RW	9	Nahomi Kawasumi
LW	8	Aya Miyama (c)
CF	11	Shinobu Ohno		(substituted off) 72'
CF	17	Yūki Ōgimi
Substitutions:
FW	16	Mana Iwabuchi		(substituted on) 72'
MF	10	Homare Sawa		(substituted on) 90'
Manager:
Norio Sasaki

Player of the Match:
Rumi Utsugi (Japan)

Assistant referees:
Nataliya Rachynska (Ukraine)
Sanja Rođak-Karšić (Croatia)
Fourth official:
Melissa Borjas (Honduras)
Fifth official:
Shirley Perello (Honduras)

=== England vs Canada ===
27 June 2015
16:30 PDT (UTC−7)

England	2–1	Canada
Taylor 11'; Bronze 14'	Report	Sinclair 42'

BC Place, Vancouver
Attendance: 54,027
Referee: Claudia Umpiérrez (Uruguay)

England	Canada

GK	1	Karen Bardsley		(substituted off) 52'
RB	12	Lucy Bronze
CB	5	Steph Houghton (c)
CB	6	Laura Bassett
LB	3	Claire Rafferty
DM	4	Fara Williams		(substituted off) 79'
CM	11	Jade Moore	(yellow card) 63'
CM	8	Jill Scott
AM	16	Katie Chapman
CF	19	Jodie Taylor
CF	10	Karen Carney		(substituted off) 90+3'
Substitutions:
GK	13	Siobhan Chamberlain		(substituted on) 52'
FW	23	Ellen White		(substituted on) 79'
DF	15	Casey Stoney		(substituted on) 90+3'
Manager:
Mark Sampson

GK	1	Erin McLeod
RB	7	Rhian Wilkinson		(substituted off) 62'
CB	3	Kadeisha Buchanan
CB	10	Lauren Sesselmann	(yellow card) 90+3'
LB	15	Allysha Chapman
CM	22	Ashley Lawrence
CM	11	Desiree Scott		(substituted off) 77'
CM	13	Sophie Schmidt
RF	14	Melissa Tancredi		(substituted off) 71'
CF	9	Josée Bélanger
LF	12	Christine Sinclair (c)
Substitutions:
MF	8	Diana Matheson		(substituted on) 62'
FW	19	Adriana Leon		(substituted on) 71'
MF	6	Kaylyn Kyle		(substituted on) 77'
Manager:
John Herdman

Player of the Match:
Steph Houghton (England)

Assistant referees:
Luciana Mascaraña (Uruguay)
Loreto Toloza (Chile)
Fourth official:
Rita Gani (Malaysia)
Fifth official:
Widiya Shamsuri (Malaysia)

== Semi-finals ==
=== United States vs Germany ===
30 June 2015
19:00 EDT (UTC−4)

United States	2–0	Germany
Lloyd 69' (pen.); O'Hara 84'	Report

Olympic Stadium, Montreal
Attendance: 51,176
Referee: Teodora Albon (Romania)

United States	Germany

GK	1	Hope Solo
RB	11	Ali Krieger
CB	19	Julie Johnston	(yellow card) 59'
CB	4	Becky Sauerbrunn	(yellow card) 38'
LB	22	Meghan Klingenberg
CM	12	Lauren Holiday
CM	14	Morgan Brian
RW	17	Tobin Heath		(substituted off) 75'
LW	15	Megan Rapinoe		(substituted off) 80'
SS	10	Carli Lloyd (c)
CF	13	Alex Morgan		(substituted off) 90+3'
Substitutions:
DF	5	Kelley O'Hara		(substituted on) 75'
FW	20	Abby Wambach		(substituted on) 80'
FW	2	Sydney Leroux		(substituted on) 90+3'
Manager:
Jill Ellis

GK	1	Nadine Angerer (c)
RB	4	Leonie Maier	(yellow card) 34'
CB	5	Annike Krahn	(yellow card) 67'
CB	3	Saskia Bartusiak
LB	22	Tabea Kemme
CM	20	Lena Goeßling
CM	16	Melanie Leupolz
RW	6	Simone Laudehr
AM	11	Anja Mittag		(substituted off) 77'
LW	18	Alexandra Popp
CF	13	Célia Šašić
Substitutions:
MF	10	Dzsenifer Marozsán		(substituted on) 77'
Manager:
Silvia Neid

Player of the Match:
Carli Lloyd (United States)

Assistant referees:
Petruța Iugulescu (Romania)
Mária Súkeníková (Slovakia)
Fourth official:
Salomé di Iorio (Argentina)
Fifth official:
Mariana de Almeida (Argentina)

=== Japan vs England ===
1 July 2015
17:00 MDT (UTC−6)

Japan	2–1	England
Miyama 33' (pen.); Bassett 90+2' (o.g.)	Report	Williams 40' (pen.)

Commonwealth Stadium, Edmonton
Attendance: 31,467
Referee: Anna-Marie Keighley (New Zealand)

Japan	England

GK	18	Ayumi Kaihori
RB	19	Saori Ariyoshi
CB	3	Azusa Iwashimizu
CB	4	Saki Kumagai
LB	5	Aya Sameshima
CM	6	Mizuho Sakaguchi
CM	13	Rumi Utsugi
RW	9	Nahomi Kawasumi
LW	8	Aya Miyama (c)
CF	11	Shinobu Ohno		(substituted off) 70'
CF	17	Yūki Ōgimi	(yellow card) 90'
Substitutions:
FW	16	Mana Iwabuchi		(substituted on) 70'
Manager:
Norio Sasaki

GK	1	Karen Bardsley
RB	12	Lucy Bronze		(substituted off) 75'
CB	5	Steph Houghton (c)
CB	6	Laura Bassett
LB	3	Claire Rafferty	(yellow card) 31'
CM	11	Jade Moore
CM	4	Fara Williams		(substituted off) 86'
CM	16	Katie Chapman
RF	8	Jill Scott
CF	19	Jodie Taylor		(substituted off) 60'
LF	18	Toni Duggan
Substitutions:
FW	23	Ellen White		(substituted on) 60'
DF	2	Alex Scott		(substituted on) 75'
MF	10	Karen Carney		(substituted on) 86'
Manager:
Mark Sampson

Player of the Match:
Saori Ariyoshi (Japan)

Assistant referees:
Sarah Walker (New Zealand)
Allyson Flynn (Australia)
Fourth official:
Stéphanie Frappart (France)
Fifth official:
Manuela Nicolosi (France)

== Third place play-off ==
4 July 2015
14:00 MDT (UTC−6)

Germany	0–1 (a.e.t.)	England
	Report	Williams 108' (pen.)

Commonwealth Stadium, Edmonton
Attendance: 21,483
Referee: Ri Hyang-ok (North Korea)

Germany	England

GK	1	Nadine Angerer (c)
RB	2	Bianca Schmidt
CB	14	Babett Peter
CB	3	Saskia Bartusiak
LB	22	Tabea Kemme
CM	20	Lena Goeßling	(substituted off) 101'
CM	7	Melanie Behringer	(substituted off) 46'
RW	6	Simone Laudehr
LW	23	Sara Däbritz
CF	13	Célia Šašić	(substituted off) 73'
CF	19	Lena Petermann
Substitutions:
MF	16	Melanie Leupolz	(substituted on) 46'
FW	11	Anja Mittag	(substituted on) 73'
FW	18	Alexandra Popp	(substituted on) 101'
Manager:
Silvia Neid

GK	1	Karen Bardsley	(yellow card) 83'
CB	5	Steph Houghton (c)
CB	6	Laura Bassett	(yellow card) 92'
CB	17	Jo Potter
DM	4	Fara Williams		(substituted off) 112'
CM	8	Jill Scott
CM	16	Katie Chapman	(yellow card) 77'	(substituted off) 80'
RW	12	Lucy Bronze
LW	14	Alex Greenwood
SS	10	Karen Carney
CF	23	Ellen White		(substituted off) 61'
Substitutions:
FW	9	Eniola Aluko		(substituted on) 61'
FW	20	Lianne Sanderson		(substituted on) 80'
DF	15	Casey Stoney		(substituted on) 112'
Manager:
Mark Sampson

Player of the Match:
Karen Bardsley (England)

Assistant referees:
Hong Kum-nyo (North Korea)
Kim Kyoung-min (South Korea)
Fourth official:
Gladys Lengwe (Zambia)
Fifth official:
Bernadettar Kwimbira (Malawi)

== Final ==
5 July 2015
16:00 PDT (UTC−7)

United States	5–2	Japan
Lloyd 3', 5', 16'; Holiday 14'; Heath 54'	Report	Ōgimi 27'; Johnston 52' (o.g.)

BC Place, Vancouver
Attendance: 53,341
Referee: Kateryna Monzul (Ukraine)

United States	Japan

GK	1	Hope Solo
RB	11	Ali Krieger
CB	19	Julie Johnston
CB	4	Becky Sauerbrunn
LB	22	Meghan Klingenberg
RM	17	Tobin Heath	(substituted off) 79'
CM	12	Lauren Holiday
CM	14	Morgan Brian
LM	15	Megan Rapinoe	(substituted off) 61'
CF	13	Alex Morgan	(substituted off) 86'
CF	10	Carli Lloyd (c)
Substitutions:
DF	5	Kelley O'Hara	(substituted on) 61'
FW	20	Abby Wambach	(substituted on) 79'
DF	3	Christie Rampone	(substituted on) 86'
Manager:
Jill Ellis

GK	18	Ayumi Kaihori
RB	19	Saori Ariyoshi
CB	3	Azusa Iwashimizu		(substituted off) 33'
CB	4	Saki Kumagai
LB	5	Aya Sameshima
RM	9	Nahomi Kawasumi		(substituted off) 39'
CM	6	Mizuho Sakaguchi
CM	13	Rumi Utsugi
LM	8	Aya Miyama (c)
CF	11	Shinobu Ohno		(substituted off) 60'
CF	17	Yūki Ogimi
Substitutions:
MF	10	Homare Sawa	(yellow card) 82'	(substituted on) 33'
FW	15	Yuika Sugasawa		(substituted on) 39'
FW	16	Mana Iwabuchi	(yellow card) 85'	(substituted on) 60'
Manager:
Norio Sasaki

Player of the Match:
Carli Lloyd (United States)

Assistant referees:
Nataliya Rachynska (Ukraine)
Yolanda Parga (Spain)
Fourth official:
Claudia Umpierrez (Uruguay)
Fifth official:
Loreto Toloza (Chile)
