= Colombia at the FIFA Women's World Cup =

Colombia women's national football team's record at the FIFA Women's World Cup

The Colombia women's national football team has represented Colombia at the FIFA Women's World Cup at three stagings of the tournament, in 2011, 2015, 2023.

== FIFA Women's World Cup record ==
FIFA Women's World Cup record
Year	Result	Position	Pld	W	D*	L	GF	GA	Squad
(China) 1991	Did not enter								
(Sweden) 1995	Did not enter								
(United States) 1999	Did not qualify								
(United States) 2003	Did not qualify								
(China) 2007	Did not qualify								
(Germany) 2011	Group stage	14th	3	0	1	2	0	4	Squad
(Canada) 2015	Round of 16	12th	4	1	1	2	4	5	Squad
(France) 2019	Did not qualify								
(Australia) (New Zealand) 2023	Quarter-finals	8th	5	3	0	2	6	4	Squad
(Brazil) 2027	Qualified								
(Costa Rica) (Jamaica) (Mexico) (United States) 2031	To be determined								
(United Kingdom) 2035	To be determined								
Total	Quarter-finals	4/10	12	4	2	6	10	13	

FIFA Women's World Cup history
Year	Round	Date	Opponent	Result	Stadium
(Germany) 2011	Group stage	28 June	Sweden	L 0–1	BayArena, Leverkusen
(Germany) 2011	Group stage	2 July	United States	L 0–3	Rhein-Neckar-Arena, Sinsheim
(Germany) 2011	Group stage	6 July	North Korea	D 0–0	Ruhrstadion, Bochum
(Canada) 2015	Group stage	9 June	Mexico	D 1–1	Moncton Stadium, Moncton
(Canada) 2015	Group stage	13 June	France	W 2–0	Moncton Stadium, Moncton
(Canada) 2015	Group stage	17 June	England	L 1–2	Olympic Stadium, Montreal
(Canada) 2015	Round of 16	22 June	United States	L 0–2	Commonwealth Stadium, Edmonton
(Australia) (New Zealand) 2023	Group stage	25 July	South Korea	W 2–0	Sydney Football Stadium, Sydney
(Australia) (New Zealand) 2023	Group stage	30 July	Germany	W 2–1	Sydney Football Stadium, Sydney
(Australia) (New Zealand) 2023	Group stage	3 August	Morocco	L 0–1	Perth Oval, Perth
(Australia) (New Zealand) 2023	Round of 16	8 August	Jamaica	W 1–0	Melbourne Rectangular Stadium, Melbourne
(Australia) (New Zealand) 2023	Quarter-Finals	12 August	England	L 1–2	Stadium Australia, Sydney
(Brazil) 2027	Group stage				

== 2011 FIFA Women's World Cup ==
=== Group C ===
Pos	Team	Pld	W	D	L	GF	GA	GD	Pts	Qualification
1	Sweden	3	3	0	0	4	1	+3	9	Advance to knockout stage
2	United States	3	2	0	1	6	2	+4	6	Advance to knockout stage
3	North Korea	3	0	1	2	0	3	−3	1	
4	Colombia	3	0	1	2	0	4	−4	1	

Source: FIFA
Rules for classification: Group stage tiebreakers
28 June 2011
15:00

Colombia	0–1	Sweden
	Report	Landström 57'

BayArena, Leverkusen
Attendance: 21,106
Referee: Carol Anne Chenard (Canada)
2 July 2011
18:00

United States	3–0	Colombia
O'Reilly 12'; Rapinoe 50'; Lloyd 57'	Report

Rhein-Neckar-Arena, Sinsheim
Attendance: 25,475
Referee: Dagmar Damková (Czech Republic)
6 July 2011
20:45

North Korea	0–0	Colombia
	Report

Ruhrstadion, Bochum
Attendance: 7,805
Referee: Christina Pedersen (Norway)

== 2015 FIFA Women's World Cup ==
=== Group F ===
Pos	Team	Pld	W	D	L	GF	GA	GD	Pts	Qualification
1	France	3	2	0	1	6	2	+4	6	Advance to knockout stage
2	England	3	2	0	1	4	3	+1	6	Advance to knockout stage
3	Colombia	3	1	1	1	4	3	+1	4	Advance to knockout stage
4	Mexico	3	0	1	2	2	8	−6	1	

Source: FIFA
Rules for classification: Group stage tiebreakers
9 June 2015
17:00 ADT (UTC−3)

Colombia	1–1	Mexico
Montoya 82'	Report	V. Pérez 36'

Moncton Stadium, Moncton
Attendance: 11,686
Referee: Thérèse Neguel (Cameroon)
13 June 2015
14:00 ADT (UTC−3)

France	0–2	Colombia
	Report	Andrade 19'; Usme 90+3'

Moncton Stadium, Moncton
Attendance: 13,138
Referee: Qin Liang (China PR)
17 June 2015
16:00 EDT (UTC−4)

England	2–1	Colombia
Carney 15'; Williams 38' (pen.)	Report	Andrade 90+4'

Olympic Stadium, Montreal
Attendance: 13,862
Referee: Carol Anne Chenard (Canada)

=== Round of 16 ===
22 June 2015
18:00 MDT (UTC−6)

United States	2–0	Colombia
Morgan 53'; Lloyd 66' (pen.)	Report

Commonwealth Stadium, Edmonton
Attendance: 19,412
Referee: Stéphanie Frappart (France)

== 2023 FIFA Women's World Cup ==
=== Group H ===
Pos	Team	Pld	W	D	L	GF	GA	GD	Pts	Qualification
1	Colombia	3	2	0	1	4	2	+2	6	Advance to knockout stage
2	Morocco	3	2	0	1	2	6	−4	6	Advance to knockout stage
3	Germany	3	1	1	1	8	3	+5	4	
4	South Korea	3	0	1	2	1	4	−3	1	

Source: FIFA
Rules for classification: Group stage tiebreakers
25 July 2023
12:00 UTC+10

Colombia	2–0	South Korea
Usme 30' (pen.); Caicedo 39'	Report

Sydney Football Stadium, Sydney
Attendance: 24,323
Referee: Rebecca Welch (England)

30 July 2023
19:30 UTC+10

Germany	1–2	Colombia
Popp 89' (pen.)	Report	Caicedo 52'; Vanegas 90+7'

Sydney Football Stadium, Sydney
Attendance: 40,499
Referee: Melissa Borjas (Honduras)

3 August 2023
18:00 UTC+8

Morocco	1–0	Colombia
Lahmari 45+4'	Report

Perth Rectangular Stadium, Perth
Attendance: 17,342
Referee: Maria Sole Ferrieri Caputi (Italy)

=== Round of 16 ===
8 August 2023
18:00 UTC+10

Colombia	1–0	Jamaica
Usme 51'	Report

Melbourne Rectangular Stadium, Melbourne
Attendance: 27,706
Referee: Kate Jacewicz (Australia)

=== Quarter-finals ===
12 August 2023
20:30 UTC+10

England	2–1	Colombia
Hemp 45+7'; Russo 63'	Report	Santos 44'

Stadium Australia, Sydney
Attendance: 75,784
Referee: Ekaterina Koroleva (United States)

== Goalscorers ==
Player	Goals	2011	2015	2023	2027
Catalina Usme	3		1	2	
Lady Andrade	2		2		
Linda Caicedo	2			2	
Daniela Montoya	1		1		
Manuela Vanegas	1			1	
Leicy Santos	1			1	
Total	10	0	4	6	

== Head-to-head record ==
Opponent	Pld	W	D	L	GF	GA	GD	Win %
England	2	0	0	2	2	4	−2	0.00
France	1	1	0	0	2	0	+2	100.00
Germany	1	1	0	0	2	1	+1	100.00
Jamaica	1	1	0	0	1	0	+1	100.00
Mexico	1	0	1	0	1	1	+0	0.00
Morocco	1	0	0	1	0	1	−1	0.00
North Korea	1	0	1	0	0	0	+0	0.00
South Korea	1	1	0	0	2	0	+2	100.00
Sweden	1	0	0	1	0	1	−1	0.00
United States	2	0	0	2	0	5	−5	0.00
Total	12	4	2	6	10	13	−3	33.33
