= Valeria Miranda =

Mexican footballer (born 1992)

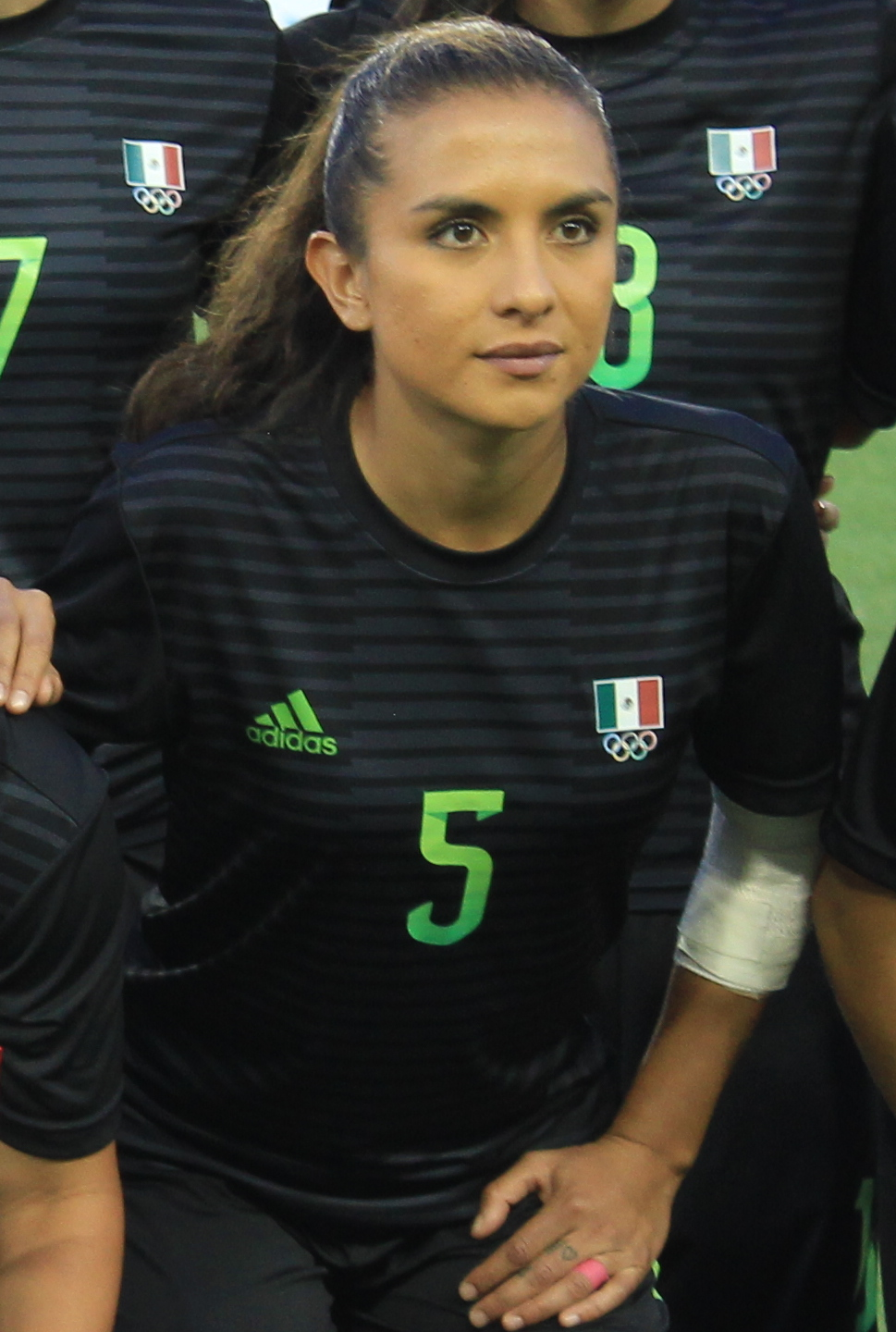
- Miranda in 2015

Personal information
- Full name: Valeria Aurora Miranda Rodríguez
- Date of birth: 18 August 1992 (age 34)
- Place of birth: Mexico City, Mexico
- Height: 1.65 m (5 ft 5 in)
- Position: Centre-back

Team information
- Current team: Cruz Azul
- Number: 2

Youth career
- 2000–2010: Pumas UNAM

College career
Years	Team	Apps	(Gls)
2016–2018	Tyler Junior College		

Senior career*
Years	Team	Apps	(Gls)
2010–2016	Pumas UNAM	0	(0)
2020–2023	Querétaro	48	(1)
2023	Pachuca	0	(0)
2024	Atlas	32	(0)
2025–	Cruz Azul	27	(1)

International career^{‡}
2010	Mexico U17	?	(?)
2010–2012	Mexico U20	?	(?)
2015–	Mexico	17	(0)
- * Club domestic league appearances and goals as of 1 February 2026 ‡ National team caps and goals as of 09:39, 18 June 2015 (UTC)

Valeria Aurora Miranda Rodríguez (born 25 August 1992) is a Mexican professional Footballer who currently plays as defender for Liga Femenil club Cruz Azul and the Mexico women's national team.

== Club career ==
=== Pumas UNAM ===
Miranda joined Pumas UNAM at age 8.

=== Taylor Junior College ===
In July 2016, Miranda signed a two-year-contract with Tyler Junior College of Texas in the United States.
