= Oriánica Velásquez =

Colombian footballer (born 1989)

Orianica Velásquez
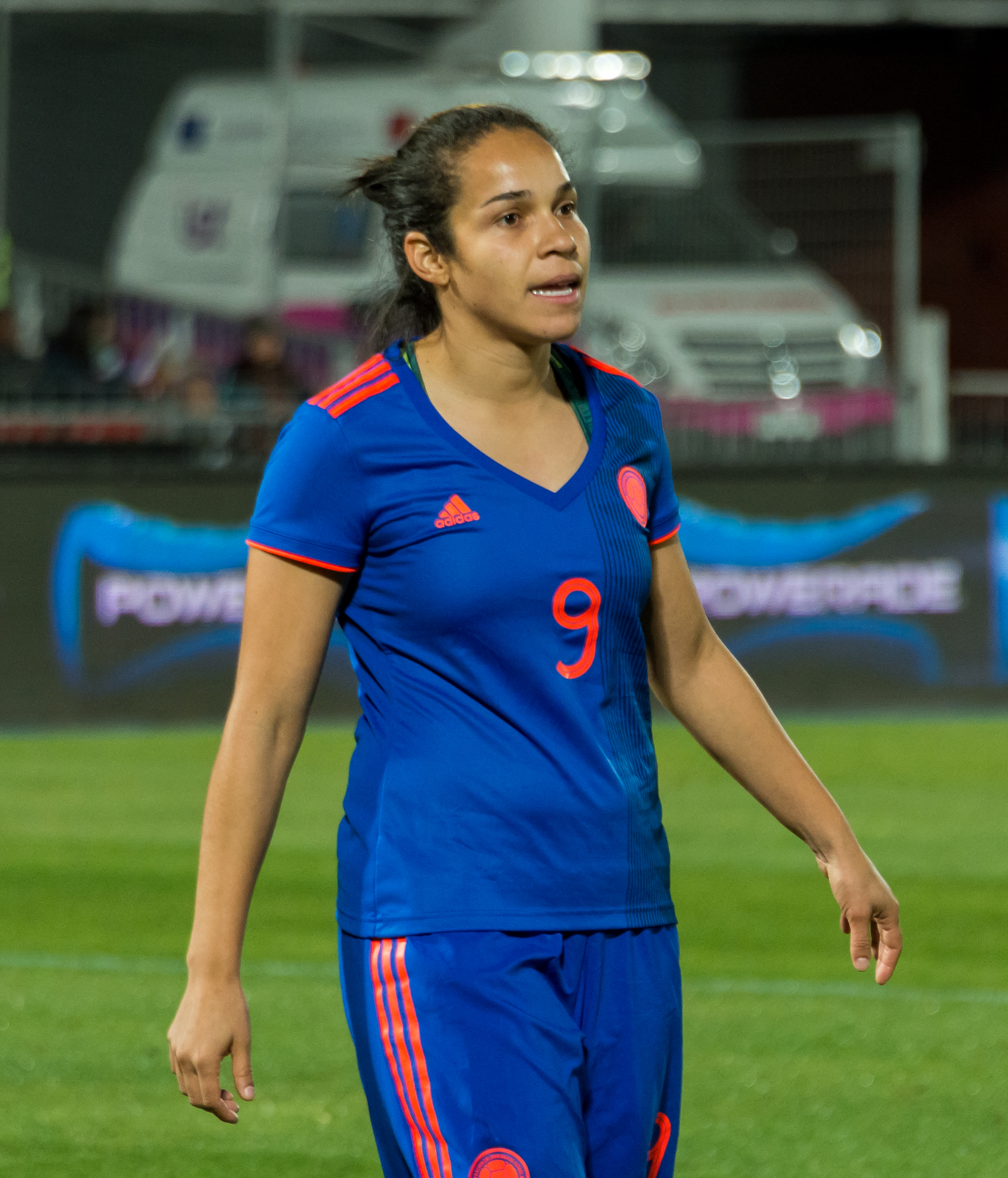
- Oriánica Velásquez, Chile v Colombia, 2019

Personal information
- Full name: Orianica Velásquez Herrera
- Date of birth: 1 August 1989 (age 37)
- Place of birth: Villanueva, La Guajira, Colombia
- Height: 1.70 m (5 ft 7 in)
- Position: Left back

Team information
- Current team: Junior

College career
Years	Team	Apps	(Gls)
2009–2012	Indiana Hoosiers		

Senior career*
Years	Team	Apps	(Gls)
- Club Gol Star
- Formas Íntimas
- Club Gol Star
2013–2014	Transportes Alcaine	29	(8)
2014	Houston Aces		
2016–2017	1207 Antalya Spor	14	(14)
20??–	Junior		

International career^{‡}
2010–	Colombia	41	(2)
Medal record
Women's football
Representing Colombia
Pan American Games
Gold medal – first place	2019 Lima	Team
- * Club domestic league appearances and goals as of 15 March 2017 ‡ National team caps and goals as of 23 June 2015

Orianica Velasquez Herrera (born 1 August 1989) is a Colombian footballer who plays as a left back for Atlético Junior and the Colombia women's national team.

== Club career ==
In October 2016, Velasquez moved to Turkey, and joined 1207 Antalya Dçşemealtı Belediye Spor along with her compatriots Lady Andrade and Carolina Arias to play in the 2016–17 Turkish Women's First Football League.

== International career ==
Velasquez made her international debut for Colombia on 12 November 2006 against Uruguay. She represented the country at both the 2012 and 2016 Summer Olympics, and the 2011 and 2015 Women's World Cups.

== Career statistics ==
As of match played 15 March 2017.

Club	Season	League			Continental		National		Total	
Club	Season	Division	Apps	Goals	Apps	Goals	Apps	Goals	Apps	Goals
1207 Antalyaspor	2016–17	First League	14	14	–	–			14	14
1207 Antalyaspor	Total		14	14	–	–			14	14
