= Carolina Arias =

Colombian footballer (born 1990)

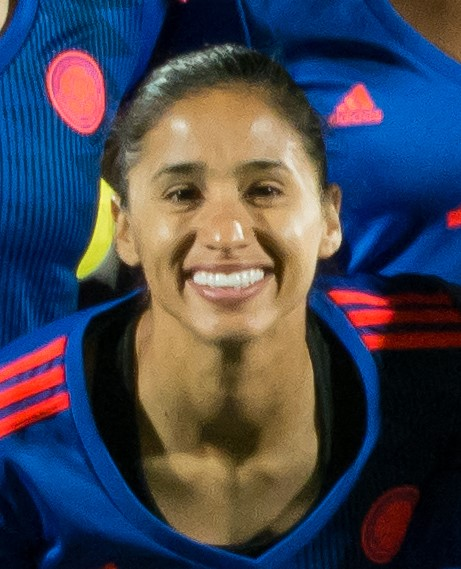
- Arias with Colombia in 2019

Personal information
- Full name: Carolina Arias Vidal
- Date of birth: 2 September 1990 (age 36)
- Place of birth: Cali, Colombia
- Height: 1.60 m (5 ft 3 in)
- Position: Right-back

Team information
- Current team: América de Cali
- Number: 17

College career
Years	Team	Apps	(Gls)
2011	LCCC Golden Eagles	15	(3)

Senior career*
Years	Team	Apps	(Gls)
- CD Palmiranas
- Orsomarso
2016–2017	1207 Antalya Spor	9	(2)
2018	Atlético Nacional		
2018–2019	Servette		
2019	Atlético Huila		
2020	Atlético Madrid	0	(0)
2021–2022	Deportivo Cali	32	(0)
2023	Atlético Junior	16	(2)
2024–	América de Cali		

International career^{‡}
2010	Colombia U20	6	(0)
2010–	Colombia	71	(1)
Medal record
Women's football
Representing Colombia
Copa América Femenina
Runner-up	2014 Ecuador
Runner-up	2022 Colombia
Silver medal – second place	2025 Ecuador
Pan American Games
Gold medal – first place	2019 Lima	Team
- * Club domestic league appearances and goals as of 18 July 2023 ‡ National team caps and goals as of 18 July 2023

Carolina Arias Vidal (born 2 September 1990) is a Colombian footballer who plays as a right-back for Liga Femenina club América de Cali and the Colombia national team.

After a season of college soccer in the United States, Arias played for Orsomarso before moving abroad to Turkey with 1207 Antalya Spor, Switzerland with Servette and Spain with Atlético Madrid. Back in Colombia she won the 2021 Liga Femenina with Deportivo Cali and later joined América de Cali.

A Colombia international since 2010, Arias has played at the 2015 and 2023 World Cups and the 2016 and 2024 Olympic tournaments, won gold at the 2019 Pan American Games, and finished as a runner-up at three editions of the Copa América Femenina.

== Early life ==
Arias was born in Cali on 2 September 1990 to María Isabel Vidal and Hernando Arias, and grew up in the Alirio Mora Beltrán neighbourhood as the youngest of several sisters. Her mother's enthusiasm for the game drew her to football, and she played barefoot in the street with other children in the neighbourhood. She trained at the Carlos Sarmiento Lora school in Cali and with local sides including Águilas Rojas, Cali Juniors and Generaciones Palmiranas.

== College career ==
Arias spent the 2011 season with the Golden Eagles of Laramie County Community College in the United States, making 15 appearances and scoring three goals.

== Club career ==
=== Early career ===
Arias came through the Carlos Sarmiento Lora school in Cali and played for Generaciones Palmiranas and Orsomarso in Colombia before moving abroad.

=== 1207 Antalya Spor ===
In October 2016, Arias moved to Turkey and joined 1207 Antalya Döşemealtı Belediye Spor alongside her compatriots Lady Andrade and Oriánica Velásquez, the three arriving together for the 2016–17 Turkish Women's First Football League season. She made nine league appearances and scored twice for the club. A fractured tibia ended her time in Turkey.

=== Atlético Nacional ===
Arias returned to Colombia in 2018 with Atlético Nacional, who reached the final of that year's Liga Femenina. Atlético Huila won the first leg 2–1, and after Nacional levelled the tie at 2–2 on aggregate the final went to a shootout, which Huila won 3–0 on 31 May 2018.

=== Servette ===
On 13 August 2018, Arias signed for Swiss club Servette FCCF from Atlético Nacional, taking the number 17 shirt. The club described her as a versatile player able to operate as a full-back or a winger, and noted that she arrived with 80 caps for Colombia and previous experience in the United States and the Turkish top flight. Her spell in Switzerland ran into 2019.

=== Atlético Huila ===
Arias joined Atlético Huila in 2019, playing in the Liga Femenina and in the Copa Libertadores Femenina, which the club had won the previous year as Colombian champions.

=== Atlético Madrid ===
Atlético Madrid announced Arias's signing on 22 January 2020. Introducing herself, she said she was "very fast", read the game well and brought an attacking threat unusual for a defender: "I am a player with a lot of surprise in terms of the offensive part." She made no competitive appearance for the club in a season cut short by the COVID-19 pandemic, and was one of five players whose contracts the club allowed to expire on 30 June 2020.

=== Deportivo Cali ===
Arias returned to her home city with Deportivo Cali for the 2021 season. Cali went through the campaign unbeaten — nine wins and five draws from 14 matches — and won the club's first women's league title, beating Independiente Santa Fe 4–1 at El Campín on 7 September and drawing the return leg 2–2 at Palmaseca for a 6–3 aggregate win.

Cali reached the final again in 2022, this time against América de Cali. Cali won the first leg 2–1, but América took the second 3–1 at the Estadio Olímpico Pascual Guerrero to win the title 4–3 on aggregate. Arias made 32 league appearances across her two seasons with the club.

=== Atlético Junior ===
In January 2023, Arias joined Atlético Junior in Barranquilla, where she made 16 league appearances and scored twice.

=== América de Cali ===
Arias signed for América de Cali in 2024, joining the club that had beaten her Deportivo Cali side in the 2022 final. In January 2026, as América rebuilt under the returning coach Andrés Usme following a disappointing 2025 season, she was named among the experienced players retained for the new campaign.

== International career ==
Arias represented Colombia at under-20 level at the 2010 FIFA U-20 Women's World Cup in Germany and made her senior debut in 2010, the year she also played at the 2010 South American Women's Football Championship.

She was a runner-up at the 2014 Copa América Femenina and played at the 2015 FIFA Women's World Cup in Canada. On 14 July 2016, she was named in the squad for the 2016 Summer Olympics, and she was also called up for the 2018 Copa América Femenina. In 2019 she was part of the Colombia team that won the gold medal in the women's tournament at the 2019 Pan American Games in Lima.

Named in the squad for the 2022 Copa América Femenina on 3 July 2022, Arias tested positive for COVID-19 on 7 July and took no further part in the tournament: CONMEBOL withdrew her accreditation on the grounds that she had not completed the seven days of isolation its protocols required, although she had returned a negative test after five. The Colombian federation appealed the decision. Colombia finished as runners-up.

On 4 July 2023, Arias was called up for the 2023 FIFA Women's World Cup, at which Colombia reached the quarter-finals. She was also selected for the 2024 CONCACAF W Gold Cup and, on 5 July 2024, for the 2024 Summer Olympics in Paris. She was a runner-up for a third time at the 2025 Copa América Femenina.

== Career statistics ==
As of match played 5 February 2017.

Club	Season	League			Continental		National		Total	
Club	Season	Division	Apps	Goals	Apps	Goals	Apps	Goals	Apps	Goals
1207 Antalyaspor	2016–17	First League	9	2	–	–			9	2
1207 Antalyaspor	Total		9	2	–	–			9	2

== Honours ==
Deportivo Cali

- Liga Femenina: 2021

Colombia

- Pan American Games gold medal: 2019
- Copa América Femenina runner-up: 2014, 2022, 2025

== See also ==
- List of women's footballers with 100 or more international caps
