= Natalia Rachynska =

Ukrainian football referee

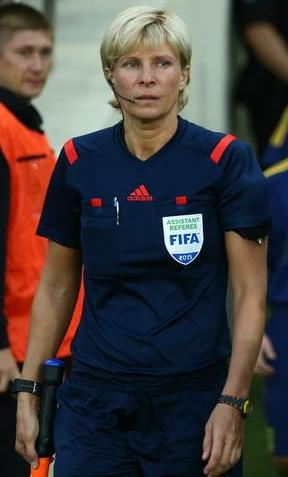
- Born: 14 August 1970 (age 56)

Domestic
Years	League	Role

International
Years	League	Role

Natalia Volodymyrivna Rachynska (Ukrainian: Наталія Володимирівна Рачинська; born 14 August 1970) is a retired Ukrainian assistant football referee. She was the first female referee in a Ukrainian Premier League. Rachynska was selected to become a referee at UEFA Women's Euro 2013. She was previously also a professional football player.
