= Thérèse Neguel =

Cameroonian football referee (born 1981)

- Full name: Thérèse Raïssa Neguel
- Born: 30 December 1981 (age 44); Cameroon

Domestic
Years	League	Role

International
Years	League	Role
2007–	FIFA-listed	Referee

Thérèse Raissa Neguel (born 30 December 1981) is a Cameroonian football referee.

== Career ==
She has been an international referee since 2007. She started at the Regional League North of Cameroon and Cameroon represented the women's tournament at the 2012 London Olympic Games. She was one of 16 referees selected for the FIFA Women's World Cup 2011.

She is part of female referees and assistant referees from 31 countries who were selected by FIFA to referee matches in the 2014 Algarve Cup in Portugal. This tournament is part of the preparation of candidates for the FIFA U-20 Women's World, Canada 2014 and the 2015 Women's World Cup FIFA, Canada.
