= Sandra Sepúlveda =

Colombian footballer (born 1988)

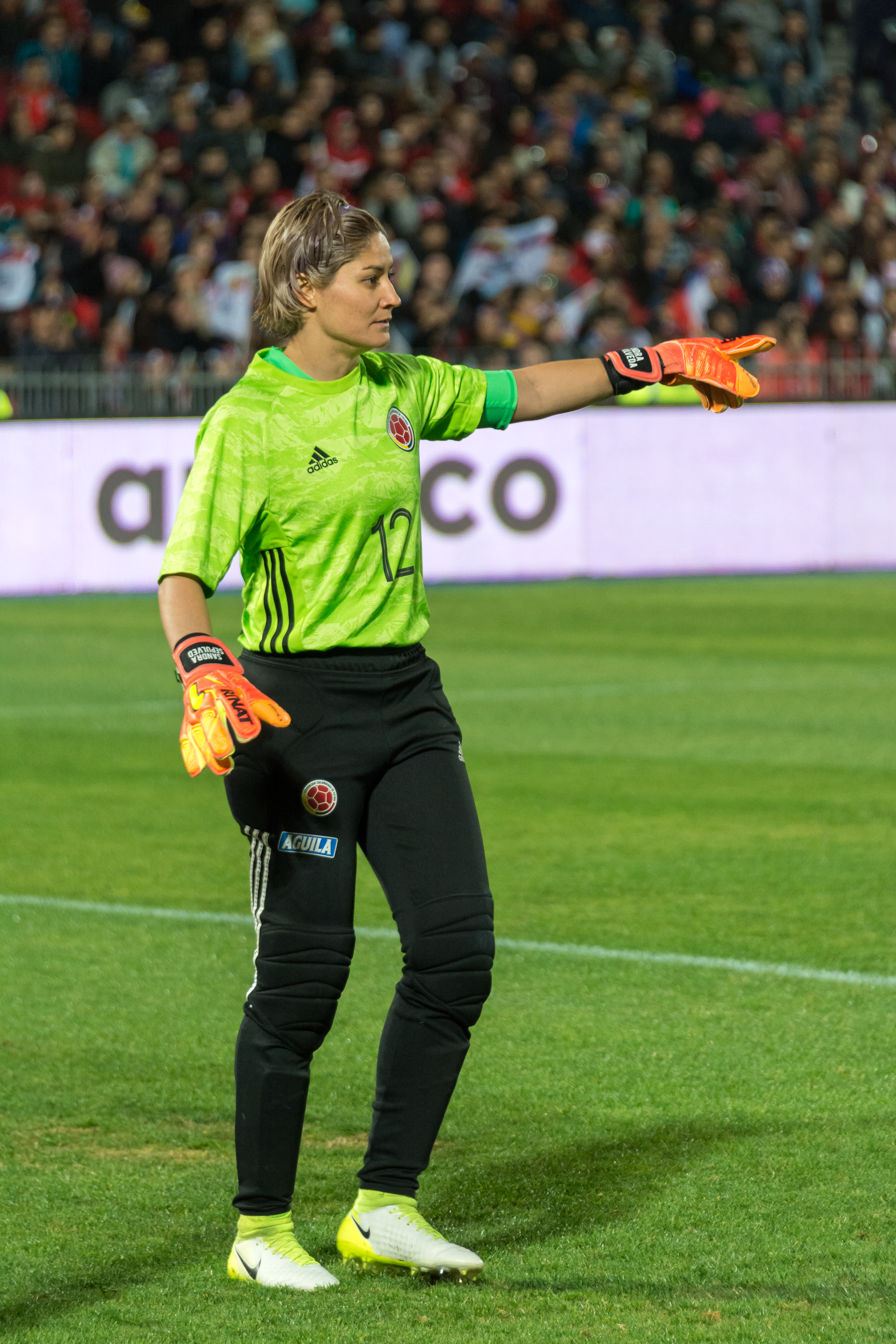
- Sepúlveda with Colombia in 2019

Personal information
- Full name: Sandra Milena Sepúlveda Lopera
- Date of birth: 3 March 1988 (age 38)
- Place of birth: Bello, Antioquia, Colombia
- Height: 1.68 m (5 ft 6 in)
- Position: Goalkeeper

Team information
- Current team: Llaneros

Senior career*
Years	Team	Apps	(Gls)
2009–2014	Formas Íntimas		
2015–2017	Kiryat Gat		
2018	Junior		
2019–2020	Independiente Medellín		
2021	Deportivo Cali	13	(0)
2023	Independiente Medellín	14	(0)
2024-	Llaneros		

International career^{‡}
2009–2024	Colombia	49	(0)
Medal record
Women's football
Representing Colombia
Copa América Femenina
Runner-up	2014 Ecuador
Runner-up	2022 Colombia
- * Club domestic league appearances and goals ‡ National team caps and goals as of 18 July 2023

Sandra Milena Sepúlveda Lopera (born 3 March 1988) is a Colombian footballer who plays as a goalkeeper for Llaneros.

== Club career ==
Sepúlveda joined her first club, Formas Íntimas, as a 10-year-old. She rose to club captain and played in the Copa Libertadores Femenina. She accepted a contract offer from the Israeli club Kiryat Gat in November 2015. In January 2018 she agreed to sign for Atlético Junior's newly formed women's team, who were entering the Colombian Women's Football League.

In 2023, Sepúlveda was announced at Independiente Medellín for a second spell.

== International career ==
Sepúlveda made her debut for Colombia at 16 years old. In 2011, she was listed in the Top 10 of the FIFA Ranking of the best goalkeepers in the world.

Sepúlveda played for Colombia at the 2012 and 2016 Olympics.

She was voted best goalkeeper at the 2014 Women's Copa America.

She was part of Colombia's team at the 2015 World Cup.

On 14 July 2016, she was called up to the Colombia squad for the 2016 Summer Olympics.

Sepúlveda was called up to the Colombia squad for the 2018 Copa América Femenina.

On 3 July 2022, she was called up to the Colombia squad for the 2022 Copa América Femenina, which Colombia finished as runners-up.

In April 2023, Sepúlveda discussed prioritizing the World Cup, after Colombia missed out on the 2019 World Cup. On 4 July 2023, she was called up to the Colombia squad for the 2023 FIFA Women's World Cup.

Sepúlveda was called up to the Colombia squad for the 2024 CONCACAF W Gold Cup.

On 5 July 2024, she was called up to the Colombia squad for the 2024 Summer Olympics.
