= Fabián Taborda =

Colombian football manager

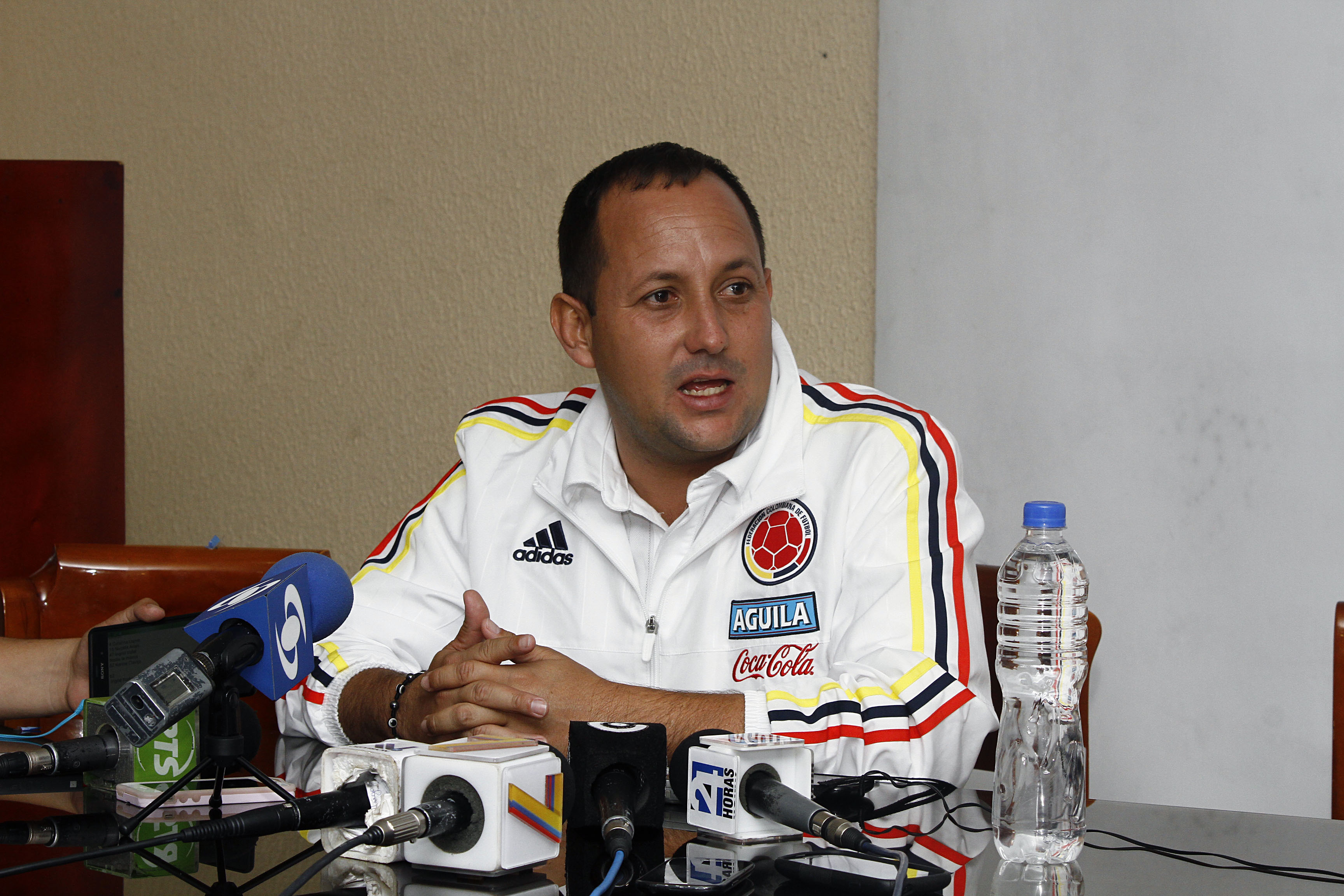
- Taborda in 2015

Personal information
- Full name: Fabián Felipe Taborda Torres
- Date of birth: 19 September 1978 (age 48)
- Place of birth: Palmira, Colombia

Managerial career
- Years: Team
- 2012–2014: Colombia Women U17
- 2014–2017: Colombia Women

Fabián Felipe Taborda Torres (born 19 September 1978) is a Colombian football manager.

== Career ==
Taborda was the head coach of the Colombia women's national team at the 2015 FIFA Women's World Cup and 2016 Summer Olympics. Under Taborda, Colombia won its first-ever Women's World Cup match in 2015, beating third-ranked France 2–0 in the group stage, and went on to reach the knockout stage for the first time.
