= Natalia Gaitán =

Colombian footballer (born 1991)

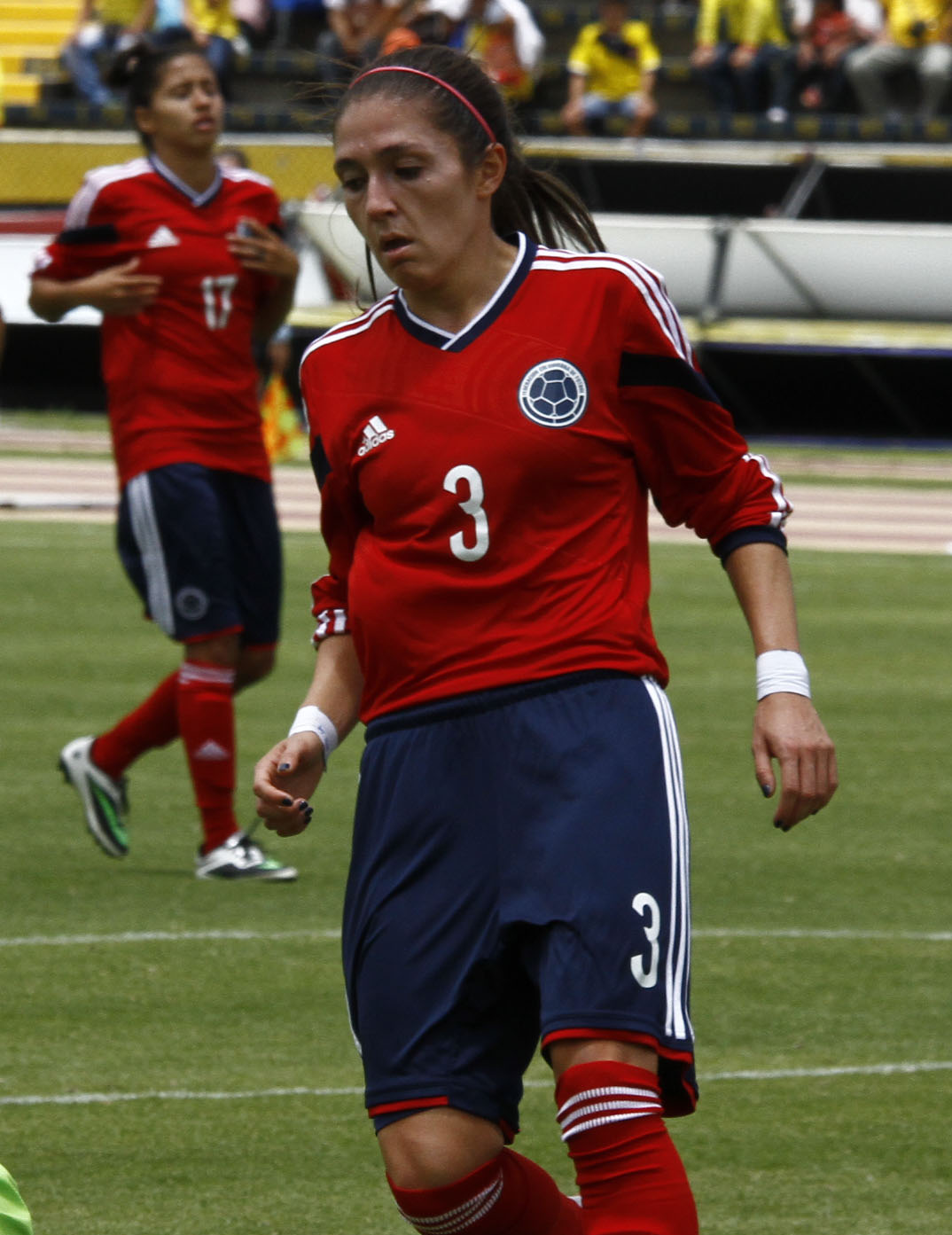

Personal information
- Full name: Natalia Gaitán Laguado
- Date of birth: 3 April 1991 (age 35)
- Place of birth: Bogotá, Colombia
- Height: 1.64 m (5 ft 5 in)
- Position: Midfielder

Youth career
- 2001–2008: Internacional de Bogotá Club

College career
Years	Team	Apps	(Gls)
2009–2012	Toledo Rockets		

Senior career*
Years	Team	Apps	(Gls)
2013–2014	CD Transportes Alcaine	28	(0)
2014	Houston Aces		
2015–2020	Valencia	97	(4)
2020–2022	Sevilla	29	(1)
2022–2023	Tigres UANL	28	(0)
2023-2024	Sante Fe	0	(0)

International career^{‡}
2008	Colombia U17		
2010	Colombia U20	6	(0)
2011–2016	Colombia	39	(4)
Medal record
Women's football
Representing Colombia
Pan American Games
Gold medal – first place	2019 Lima	Team
- * Club domestic league appearances and goals as of 15 May 2022 ‡ National team caps and goals as of 23:10, 23 June 2015 (UTC)

Natalia Gaitán Laguado (born 3 April 1991) is a Colombian former professional footballer who played as a midfielder. With her country Gaitán played at the 2012 and 2016 Olympics and also made a powerful appearance at the 2015 Women's World Cup in Canada.

== Club career ==
Gaitán signed for Valencia CF in September 2015. She had previously played in Spain for CD Transportes Alcaine in the 2013–14 season. She played the 2014 WPSL season with Houston Aces and spent the first half of 2015 in a national team training camp.

== Studies ==
Gaitán received a Bachelor's of Business Administration from the University of Toledo and an MBA in International Sports Management from Valencia CF in Spain.

== Personal life ==
Gaitán was diagnosed with acute lymphoblastic leukemia aged four and underwent chemotherapy treatment from 1994 to 1998.
