= Ángela Clavijo =

Colombian footballer (born 1993)

Korina Clavijo
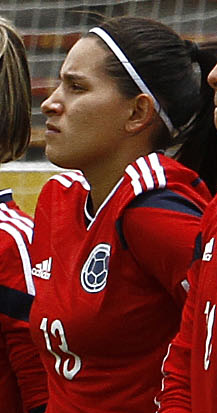
- Clavijo with Colombia in 2014

Personal information
- Full name: Ángela Corina Clavijo Silva
- Date of birth: 1 September 1993 (age 33)
- Place of birth: Villavicencio, Colombia
- Height: 1.65 m (5 ft 5 in)
- Position: Centre back

Team information
- Current team: Colo-Colo
- Number: 13

Senior career*
Years	Team	Apps	(Gls)
2013–2015	Club Kamatsa		
2017–2018	América de Cali		
2019	Independiente Cali		
2019–2021	Sporting de Huelva	15	(0)
2021	Deportivo Cali	10	(1)
2022	Cruzeiro	8+	(0+)
2023–	Colo-Colo		

International career^{‡}
2014–	Colombia	19	(0)
- * Club domestic league appearances and goals as of 16 May 2022 ‡ National team caps and goals as of 23:56, 23 June 2015 (UTC)

Ángela Corina Clavijo Silva (born 1 September 1993), known as Korina, is a Colombian professional footballer who plays as a centre back for Chilean club Colo-Colo and the Colombia women's national team.

== Career ==
In January 2021, Clavijo left the Sporting Club de Huelva and signed for Córdoba. In 2023, Clavijo moved to Chile and signed with Colo-Colo.
