= Philippe Bergerôo =

French footballer and manager (born 1954)

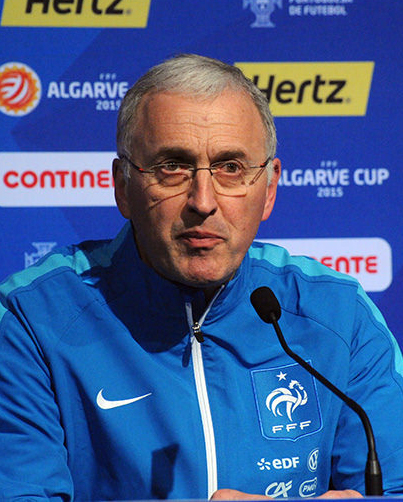
- Bergerôo as manager of the France women's national team in 2015

Personal information
- Full name: Philippe Bergerôo
- Date of birth: 13 January 1954 (age 72)
- Place of birth: Ciboure, Pyrénées-Atlantiques, France
- Height: 1.91 m (6 ft 3 in)
- Position: Goalkeeper

Youth career
- 1969–1971: Saint-Jean-de-Luz

Senior career*
Years	Team	Apps	(Gls)
1971–1978	Bordeaux	133	(0)
1978–1983	Lille	180	(0)
1983–1988	Toulouse	172	(0)
Total		485	(0)

International career
1979–1986	France	3	(0)

Managerial career
- 1999–2000: Paris Saint-Germain
- 2002: Rennes
- 2003–2004: France U17
- 2013–2016: France (women)
Medal record
Representing France
UEFA European Championship
Winner	1984
- * Club domestic league appearances and goals

Philippe Bergerôo (born 28 January 1954) is a French football manager and former player who played as a goalkeeper. For France, he earned a total number of three international caps during the late 1970s, early 1980s. He was a member of the French squad in the 1986 FIFA World Cup and the team that won the European Championship in 1984. He gained fame in the 1986-87 UEFA Cup when he saved the decisive penalty from Diego Maradona, who had recently captained Argentina to the FIFA World Cup 1986, in a first-round penalty shoot-out between his club and SSC Napoli.

Later on he became a football manager with Paris Saint-Germain and Stade Rennais.

== Honours ==
France

- UEFA European Championship: 1984

Orders

- Officer of the National Order of Merit: 1998
