= Ingrid Vidal =

Colombian footballer (born 1991)

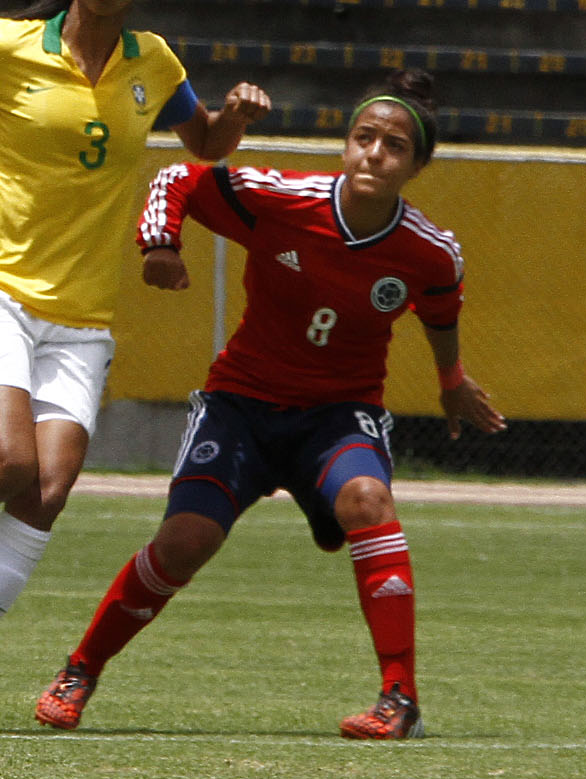

Personal information
- Full name: Ingrid Yulieth Vidal Isaza
- Date of birth: 22 April 1991 (age 35)
- Place of birth: Palmira, Valle del Cauca, Colombia
- Height: 1.59 m (5 ft 3 in)
- Position: Forward

Team information
- Current team: Dragonas IDV
- Number: 28

College career
Years	Team	Apps	(Gls)
2011	Kansas Jayhawks	21	(11)

Senior career*
Years	Team	Apps	(Gls)
2010–2022	CD Palmiranas		
2022–2025	América de Cali	8	(1)
2024	-> ZFK Ljuboten (loan)	2	(0)
2025–	Dragonas IDV	0	(0)

International career^{‡}
2008	Colombia U17		
2010	Colombia U20		
2009–2016	Colombia	54	(11)
- * Club domestic league appearances and goals ‡ National team caps and goals as of 23:17, 23 June 2015 (UTC)

Ingrid Julieth Vidal Isaza (born 22 April 1991) is a Colombian footballer who plays as a forward for Dragonas IDV and the Colombia national team. She also played for the Colombia U17 and U20 teams.

She made her debut for Colombia against Peru on 17 November 2009. Born in Palmira, Valle del Cauca, she began her career in 2009 with Generaciones Palmiranas. In 2011, she moved to the United States to play for the Kansas Jayhawks college soccer team, but she has since returned to Generaciones Palmiranas.

She was part of the Colombian 2012 Olympic team.
