= Lady Andrade =

Colombian footballer (born 1992)

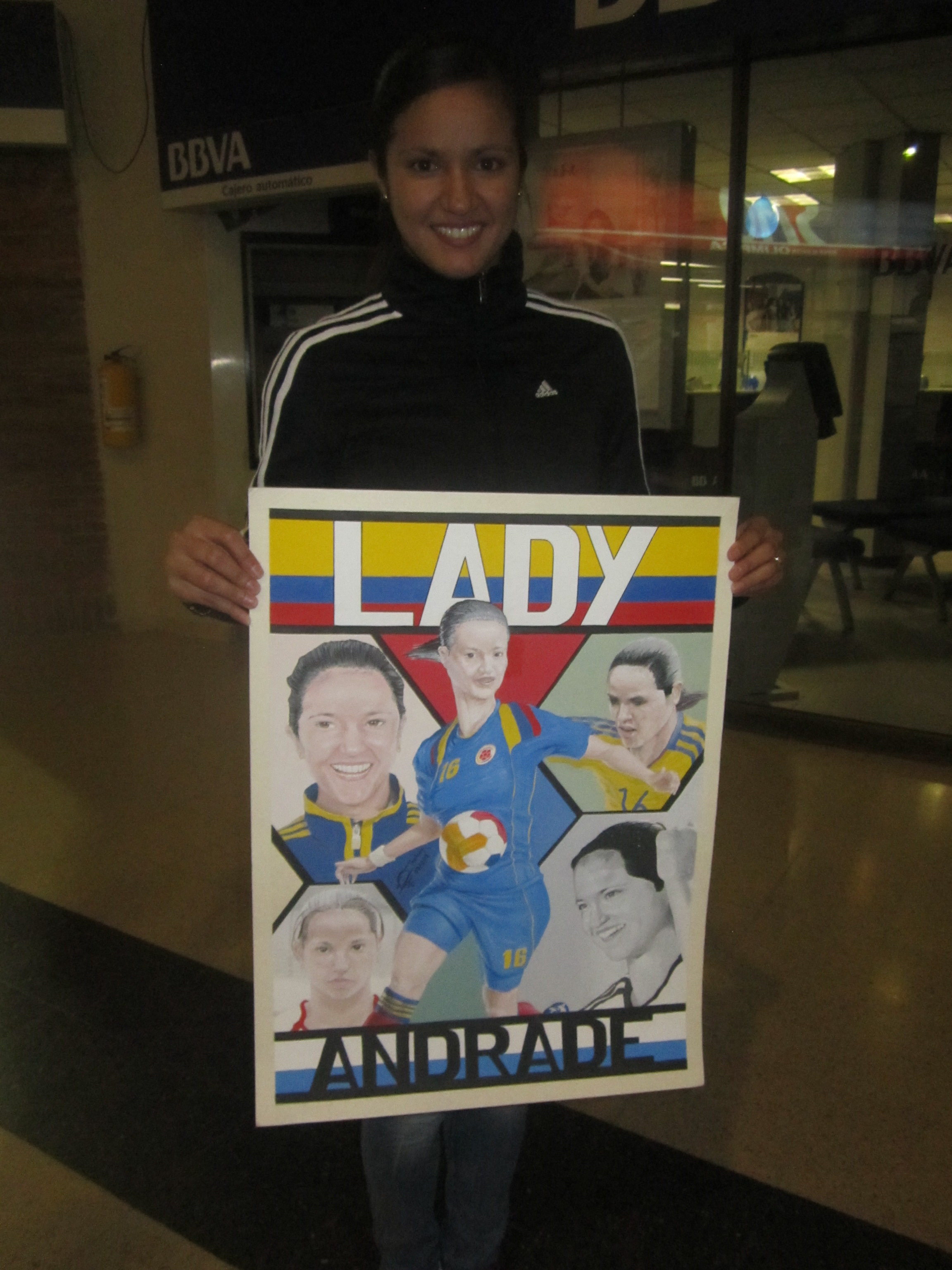
- Andrade in 2013

Personal information
- Full name: Lady Patricia Andrade Rodríguez
- Date of birth: 10 January 1992 (age 34)
- Place of birth: Bogotá, Colombia
- Height: 1.71 m (5 ft 7 in)
- Positions: Attacking midfielder; striker

Youth career
- 2002–2009: Inter Bogotá

Senior career*
| Years | Team | Apps | (Gls) |
| 2010–2012 | Formas Íntimas | | |
| 2012 | Sporting Huelva | | |
| 2013 | PK-35 Vantaa | 14 | (0) |
| 2014 | Generaciones Palmiranas | | |
| 2015–2016 | Western New York Flash | 8 | (1) |
| 2016 | 1207 Antalyaspor | 13 | (0) |
| 2017 | Independiente Santa Fe | 8 | (1) |
| 2018 | Atlético Nacional | 9 | (4) |
| 2018–2020 | AC Milan | 8 | (0) |
| 2020–2021 | Deportivo La Coruña | 19 | (2) |
| 2021 | Atlético Nacional | | |
| 2021–2022 | Tauro | | |
| 2022 | Atlético Nacional | | |
| 2022–2023 | Deportivo Cali | 0 | (0) |
| 2023–2024 | Real Brasília | 17 | (3) |
| 2024 | PAOK | | |
| 2025 | Cruzeiro | | |
| 2025–2026 | Querétaro | 13 | (2) |

International career^{‡}
| 2010 | Colombia U20 | 5 | (1) |
| 2011– | Colombia | 30 | (3) |
Medal record
Women's football
Representing Colombia
Pan American Games
| Gold medal – first place | 2019 Lima | Team |
- * Club domestic league appearances and goals as of 5 February 2026 ‡ National team caps and goals as of 19 July 2023

Lady Patricia Andrade Rodríguez (born 10 January 1992) is a Colombian professional footballer. She is an attacking midfielder who can also play as a striker.

== Club career ==
Andrade signed for Finnish Naisten Liiga club PK-35 Vantaa in the spring of 2013.

She was signed by the Western New York Flash of the NWSL on 7 July 2015. She was waived by the Flash on 20 May 2016.

In September 2016, she moved to Turkey and signed a three-year contract with 1207 Antalyaspor. In the first match of the Turkish First Football League's 2016–17 season, she scored two goals, and helped her team win the match 2–1.

On 10 February 2017, She moved to the new Colombian Football League to play for Santa Fe, and won a championship. A season later she played for Atletico National and won the league again.

On 16 July 2019, Andrade officially signed for A.C. Milan in the Italian Serie A. She had originally joined the team in August 2018, but visa complications prevented her from being signed.

On 7 July 2020, Andrade was announced at Deportivo La Coruña.

== International career ==
Andrade has represented Colombia at the 2010 U-20 Women's World Cup, making 5 appearances and scoring one goal, at the 2011 Women's World Cup, making one appearance, at the 2015 Women's World Cup, making four appearances and scoring two goals, and at the 2012 and 2016 Summer Olympics, making five total appearances. In a group match at the 2012 Olympics against the United States, she punched opposition player Abby Wambach in the right eye, resulting in a two-game ban.

Andrade made her mark on the world stage during the 2015 Women's World Cup in Canada. Andrade was Colombia's top scorer at the competition with two goals.

On 14 July 2016, she was called up to the Colombia squad for the 2016 Summer Olympics.

On 4 July 2023, she was called up to the Colombia squad for the 2023 FIFA Women's World Cup.

Andrade was called up to the Colombia squad for the 2024 CONCACAF W Gold Cup.

On 5 July 2024, she was called up to the Colombia squad for the 2024 Summer Olympics.

== International goals ==
| No. | Date | Venue | Opponent | Score | Result | Competition |
|---|---|---|---|---|---|---|
| 1. | 13 September 2014 | Estadio Bellavista, Ambato, Ecuador | Uruguay | 1–0 | 4–0 | 2014 Copa América Femenina |
| 2. | 13 June 2015 | Moncton Stadium, Moncton, Canada | France | 1–0 | 2–0 | 2015 FIFA Women's World Cup |
| 3. | 17 June 2015 | Olympic Stadium, Montreal, Canada | England | 1–2 | 1–2 | 2015 FIFA Women's World Cup |
| 4. | 2 June 2024 | Estadio Metropolitano de Lara, Barquisimeto, Venezuela | Venezuela | 3–0 | 3–0 | Friendly |
