= List of Guggenheim Fellowships awarded in 2015 =

List of Guggenheim Fellowships awarded in 2015: Guggenheim Fellowships have been awarded annually since 1925, by the John Simon Guggenheim Memorial Foundation to those "who have demonstrated exceptional capacity for productive scholarship or exceptional creative ability in the arts."

| Category | Field of Study | Fellow | Ref |
|---|---|---|---|
| Creative Arts | Choreography | Jonah Bokaer | |
| Creative Arts | Choreography | Beth Gill | |
| Creative Arts | Choreography | Jennifer Lacey | |
| Creative Arts | Choreography | Zoe Scofield | |
| Creative Arts | Choreography | Rosy Simas | |
| Creative Arts | Drama and Performance Art | Kristoffer Diaz | |
| Creative Arts | Drama and Performance Art | Lucas Hnath | |
| Creative Arts | Drama and Performance Art | Dan O'Brien | |
| Creative Arts | Fiction | Jeffrey Renard Allen | |
| Creative Arts | Fiction | Maud Casey | |
| Creative Arts | Fiction | Vikram Chandra | |
| Creative Arts | Fiction | Percival Everett | |
| Creative Arts | Fiction | Rivka Galchen | |
| Creative Arts | Fiction | Mary Beth Keane | |
| Creative Arts | Fiction | Anthony Marra | |
| Creative Arts | Fiction | Anne Michaels | |
| Creative Arts | Fiction | Kevin Powers | |
| Creative Arts | Fiction | Akhil Sharma | |
| Creative Arts | Film - Video | Julia Bacha | |
| Creative Arts | Film - Video | Almudena Carracedo | |
| Creative Arts | Film - Video | Victoria Fu | |
| Creative Arts | Film - Video | Janet Paxton Gardner | |
| Creative Arts | Film - Video | Aron Gaudet | |
| Creative Arts | Film - Video | Nadia Hironaka | |
| Creative Arts | Film - Video | Silas Howard | |
| Creative Arts | Film - Video | Keith Miller | |
| Creative Arts | Film - Video | Moon Molson | |
| Creative Arts | Film - Video | Daniel Nearing | |
| Creative Arts | Film - Video | Madeleine Olnek | |
| Creative Arts | Film - Video | Akosua Adoma Owusu | |
| Creative Arts | Film - Video | Gita Pullapilly | |
| Creative Arts | Film - Video | Iva Radivojevic | |
| Creative Arts | Film - Video | PJ Raval | |
| Creative Arts | Film - Video | Matthew Suib | |
| Creative Arts | Film - Video | Jack Walsh | |
| Creative Arts | Fine Arts | Rick Araluce | |
| Creative Arts | Fine Arts | Miyoshi Barosh | |
| Creative Arts | Fine Arts | Amy Bennett | |
| Creative Arts | Fine Arts | Matthew Blackwell | |
| Creative Arts | Fine Arts | Mel Chin | |
| Creative Arts | Fine Arts | Amanda Church | |
| Creative Arts | Fine Arts | Russell Crotty | |
| Creative Arts | Fine Arts | Karin Davie | |
| Creative Arts | Fine Arts | Stephen Davis | |
| Creative Arts | Fine Arts | Alison Hawthorne Deming | |
| Creative Arts | Fine Arts | Agnes Denes | |
| Creative Arts | Fine Arts | Fred Escher | |
| Creative Arts | Fine Arts | Tim Hawkinson | |
| Creative Arts | Fine Arts | Frank Holliday | |
| Creative Arts | Fine Arts | Vishal Jugdeo | |
| Creative Arts | Fine Arts | Mary Kelly | |
| Creative Arts | Fine Arts | Diane Landry | |
| Creative Arts | Fine Arts | Michael C. McMillen | |
| Creative Arts | Fine Arts | Sabina Ott | |
| Creative Arts | Fine Arts | M. Louise Stanley | |
| Creative Arts | Fine Arts | Kyle Staver | |
| Creative Arts | Fine Arts | Kukuli Velarde | |
| Creative Arts | Fine Arts | Royce Weatherly | |
| Creative Arts | Fine Arts | Pinar Yoldas | |
| Creative Arts | General Nonfiction | Meghan Daum | |
| Creative Arts | General Nonfiction | Melissa Fay Greene | |
| Creative Arts | General Nonfiction | Thomas Healy | |
| Creative Arts | General Nonfiction | Barbara Hurd | |
| Creative Arts | General Nonfiction | David Lazar | |
| Creative Arts | General Nonfiction | Patricia Marx | |
| Creative Arts | General Nonfiction | Christine Montross | |
| Creative Arts | General Nonfiction | Alex Ross | |
| Creative Arts | General Nonfiction | David L. Ulin | |
| Creative Arts | Music Composition | Darcy James Argue | |
| Creative Arts | Music Composition | Matthew Barnson | |
| Creative Arts | Music Composition | Richard Carrick | |
| Creative Arts | Music Composition | Etienne Charles | |
| Creative Arts | Music Composition | Chihchun Chi-sun Lee | |
| Creative Arts | Music Composition | Steve Lehman | |
| Creative Arts | Music Composition | George E. Lewis | |
| Creative Arts | Music Composition | Andreia Pinto Correia | |
| Creative Arts | Music Composition | Sean Shepherd | |
| Creative Arts | Music Composition | Rand Steiger | |
| Creative Arts | Music Composition | Amy Williams | |
| Creative Arts | Photography | Gary Briechle | |
| Creative Arts | Photography | Miles Coolidge | |
| Creative Arts | Photography | Susan Lipper | |
| Creative Arts | Photography | Susan Meiselas | |
| Creative Arts | Photography | Arno Rafael Minkkinen | |
| Creative Arts | Photography | Richard Renaldi | |
| Creative Arts | Photography | Stuart Rome | |
| Creative Arts | Photography | Richard Rothman | |
| Creative Arts | Photography | Moises Saman | |
| Creative Arts | Photography | Kim Stringfellow | |
| Creative Arts | Photography | William S. Sutton | |
| Creative Arts | Photography | Terri Weifenbach | |
| Creative Arts | Poetry | Matthew Dickman | |
| Creative Arts | Poetry | Dan Beachy-Quick | |
| Creative Arts | Poetry | Thomas Sayers Ellis | |
| Creative Arts | Poetry | Gregory Fraser | |
| Creative Arts | Poetry | Cathy Park Hong | |
| Creative Arts | Poetry | Cate Marvin | |
| Creative Arts | Poetry | Bernadette Mayer | |
| Creative Arts | Poetry | Joshua Mehigan | |
| Creative Arts | Poetry | Rowan Ricardo Phillips | |
| Creative Arts | Poetry | Christina Pugh | |
| Humanities | American Literature | Lynn Keller | |
| Humanities | American Literature | Benjamin Reiss | |
| Humanities | American Literature | Kenneth W. Warren | |
| Humanities | Architecture, Planning and Design | Swati Chattopadhyay | |
| Humanities | Architecture, Planning and Design | Michael Sorkin | |
| Humanities | Classics | Beryl Barr-Sharrar | |
| Humanities | Classics | Walter Scheidel | |
| Humanities | East Asian Studies | Andrew F. Jones | |
| Humanities | English Literature | Thomas Keymer | |
| Humanities | European and Latin American History | Kris Lane | |
| Humanities | European and Latin American History | Mary D. Lewis | |
| Humanities | European and Latin American History | James Retallack | |
| Humanities | European and Latin American History | Sarah Abrevaya Stein | |
| Humanities | European and Latin American Literature | Nicholas D. Paige | |
| Humanities | European and Latin American Literature | Maurice Samuels | |
| Humanities | Fine Arts Research | Martha Buskirk | |
| Humanities | Fine Arts Research | Matthew P. Canepa | |
| Humanities | History of Science, Technology and Economics | Nikolai Krementsov | |
| Humanities | History of Science, Technology and Economics | Lawrence M. Principe | |
| Humanities | History of Science, Technology and Economics | Asif Azam Siddiqi | |
| Humanities | Intellectual and Cultural History | Edward Baring | |
| Humanities | Intellectual and Cultural History | Richard Rabinowitz | |
| Humanities | Intellectual and Cultural History | Vanessa R. Schwartz | |
| Humanities | Linguistics | Chris Collins | |
| Humanities | Literary Criticism | Jeff Dolven | |
| Humanities | Literary Criticism | Brent Hayes Edwards | |
| Humanities | Literary Criticism | G. Gabrielle Starr | |
| Humanities | Medieval and Renaissance History | Carmela Vircillo Franklin | |
| Humanities | Music Research | Thomas Christensen | |
| Humanities | Near Eastern Studies | Christiane Gruber | |
| Humanities | Philosophy | Dominic McIver Lopes | |
| Humanities | Photography Studies | Maria Gough | |
| Humanities | Religion | José Ignacio Cabezon | |
| Humanities | Religion | Jennifer Reid | |
| Humanities | Religion | Seth L. Sanders | |
| Humanities | Religion | John S. Strong | |
| Humanities | South Asian Studies | Anthony Cerulli | |
| Humanities | Translation | Ross Benjamin | |
| Humanities | Translation | Tess Lewis | |
| Humanities | United States History | Kathleen M. Brown | |
| Humanities | United States History | Beryl Satter | |
| Humanities | United States History | Brenda Elaine Stevenson | |
| Humanities | United States History | Michael Willrich | |
| Natural Sciences | Applied Mathematics | Michael Doebeli | |
| Natural Sciences | Astronomy and Astrophysics | Amy Barger | |
| Natural Sciences | Astronomy and Astrophysics | Marla Geha | |
| Natural Sciences | Chemistry | Paula L. Diaconescu | |
| Natural Sciences | Computer Science | Vincent Conitzer | |
| Natural Sciences | Computer Science | Krishna Palem | |
| Natural Sciences | Engineering | Deb Niemeier | |
| Natural Sciences | Mathematics | Emery N. Brown | |
| Natural Sciences | Mathematics | Jordan Ellenberg | |
| Natural Sciences | Mathematics | Tatiana Toro | |
| Natural Sciences | Medicine and Health | Howard Markel | |
| Natural Sciences | Neuroscience | Laurence T. Maloney | |
| Natural Sciences | Organismic Biology & Ecology | Harold F. Greeney | |
| Natural Sciences | Organismic Biology & Ecology | Sheila N. Patek | |
| Natural Sciences | Physics | Sean M. Carroll | |
| Natural Sciences | Physics | Philip W. Phillips | |
| Natural Sciences | Plant Sciences | Eran Pichersky | |
| Natural Sciences | Science Writing | Alexander Gann | |
| Social Sciences | Anthropology and Cultural Studies | Niloofar Haeri | |
| Social Sciences | Anthropology and Cultural Studies | Steven Lubar | |
| Social Sciences | Anthropology and Cultural Studies | Jonathan Rieder | |
| Social Sciences | Economics | Timothy Kehoe | |
| Social Sciences | Education | Mark R. Warren | |
| Social Sciences | Geography and Environmental Studies | Anne Kelly Knowles | |
| Social Sciences | Law | Mark Fathi Massoud | |
| Social Sciences | Law | Gideon Yaffe | |
| Social Sciences | Sociology | Susan Eckstein | |
| Social Sciences | Sociology | Monica Prasad | |
| Social Sciences | Political Science | Wendy K. Tam Cho | |
| Social Sciences | Political Science | Sarah Barringer Gordon | |
| Social Sciences | Psychology | Jennifer Richeson | |

== See also ==
- Guggenheim Fellowship
- List of Guggenheim Fellowships awarded in 2014
- List of Guggenheim Fellowships awarded in 2016
