= Minda de Gunzburg Center for European Studies =

Research center at Harvard University

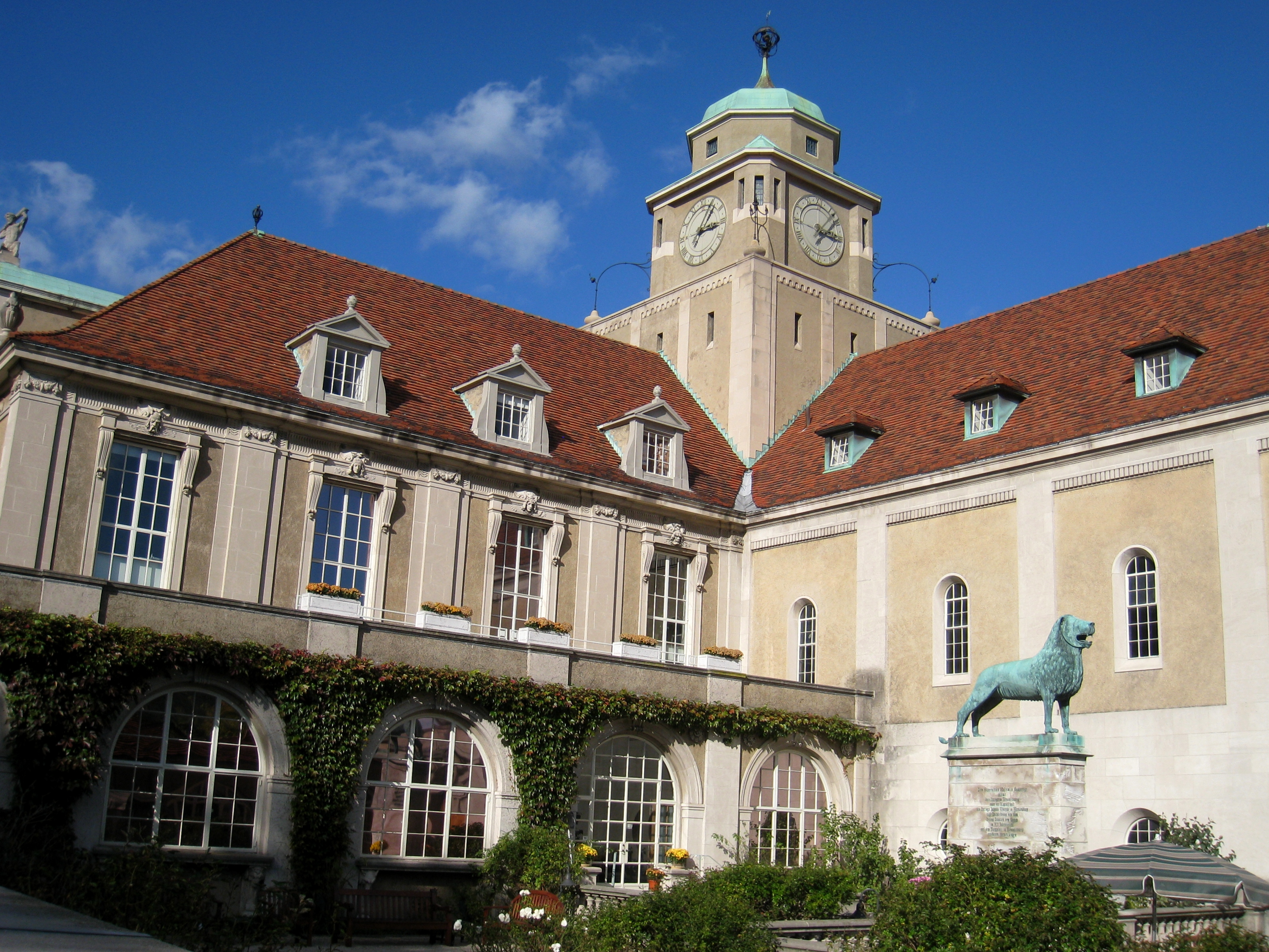
Adolphus Busch Hall, home of the center

The Minda de Gunzburg Center for European Studies (CES) is a center at Harvard University dedicated to the study, understanding, and promotion of European affairs and transatlantic relations. Founded in 1969, the center focuses on interdisciplinary scholarship in social, political, historical, and cultural dimensions of Europe. It has hosted notable political and scholarly personalities, established partnerships with institutions worldwide, hosted dozens of visiting researchers, and run programs, seminars, events, and issued publications.

== History ==
Originally founded as "West European Studies" in 1969, the Center for European Studies (CES) at Harvard evolved from two prior initiatives, the "German Research Program" initiated by Henry Kissinger and Guido Goldman, at the time Harvard faculty member, and a "West European Studies" seminar run professor Stanley Hoffmann and his student assistant Guido Goldman. The proposal by professors Hoffmann, David Landes, and Laurence Wylie to the Ford Foundation to fund European academics' visits to Harvard was one of the key milestones in the development of the center. In the center's initial years, Goldman served as the center's director, and Hoffman was the chairman. Goldman and Hoffman are seen as founders of the center. In 1978, twelve members of the Center published a letter in The New York Times criticizing Kissinger for his statements about the threat of communism.

In 1986, with a $10 million donation by Baron Alain de Gunzburg and his family that controlled the Seagram Company, the Center was named after his sister Baroness Aileen Mindel "Minda" Bronfman de Gunzburg (1925-1985), the wife of a prominent French banker and industrialist. A year earlier she had died of cancer. She was the daughter of millionaires Saidye and Samuel Bronfman.

In 1989, the Center for European Studies transitioned into its new permanent location at Adolphus Busch Hall (originally home to Harvard's Germanic Museum, which later became known as the Busch-Reisinger Museum). This relocation was celebrated with a conference featuring European Commission President Jacques Delors. The building formerly housed the Busch-Reisinger Museum, a component of Harvard Art Museum.

The move was facilitated by two significant developments. First, the Fogg Art Museum's expansion allowed the German art collection to be relocated, ensuring its better preservation within the newly consolidated Harvard Art Museums. Goldman, CES director from 1969 to 1994 and a close family friend, noted the crucial role of the de Gunzburgs' support in securing the center's future.

The Center incorporated a larger number of faculty, students, and scholars. By 1996–97, it hosted 18 senior faculty, 10 junior faculty, 26 visiting scholars, 47 affiliates, and 52 graduate students.

Goldman raised over 75 million dollars for the Center and the Harvard university from the German government, German and American corporations, and other sources which donated large sums to bolster ties between Europe and the United States.

Charles S. Maier directed the center from 1994 to 2001, taking over from Guido Goldman. Grzegorz Ekiert, professor of government at Harvard, was the center's director from 2012. Elaine Papoulias has been the executive director since 2013.

The CES celebrated its 50th anniversary in September 2019.

In September 2023, Daniel Ziblatt was named the new director, to start in January 2024.

== Faculty and fellows ==
As of 2023, the Center's resident faculty are Grzegorz Ekiert, Alison Frank Johnson, Peter E. Gordon, Peter A. Hall, Patrice Higonnet, Maya Jasanoff, Hans-Helmut Kotz, Mary D. Lewis, Charles S. Maier, Derek J. Penslar, David Spreen, and Daniel Ziblatt. Faculty associates include Alberto Abadie, Rawi E. Abdelal, Daron Acemoglu, James Alt, David Armitage, Jacqueline Bhabha, Sven Beckert, Jason Beckfield, Suzanne Berger, Manja Klemenčič, and Pippa Norris. Senior fellows and affiliates include Jutta Allmendinger, Nicolas Berggruen, Mark Franklin, Sigmar Gabriel, Anna Grzymała-Busse, Michael Ignatieff, Louise Richardson, Radosław Sikorski, Paul Tucker, and Joseph H.H. Weiler.

For the spring 2025 semester, former Greek Prime Minister Alexis Tsipras was appointed resident Policy Fellow at CES and Harvard's Center for Hellenic Studies.

== Notable speakers ==
Notable speakers hosted by the Center in its first years included Jacques Delors, Christiane Lemke, Andreas Buschner, Sigmar Gabriel, and Miriam Meckel.

The center has hosted presidents, prime ministers, other prominent politicians, and distinguished scholars and personalities. Some of them are Roberta Metsola, Sviatlana Tsikhanouskaya, and Radek Sikorski Several of the center's affiliates, including Alexander Görlach, have been frequent contributors to The New York Times.

== External link ==
- https://ces.fas.harvard.edu
