= Richard Benefield =

American museum director

Richard Benefield (born in Birmingham, Alabama) is executive director of the George Rickey Foundation, Inc., as well as an independent consultant to museums and educational organizations including the Heard Museum, University of Arizona, and Fine Arts Museums of San Francisco. He previously held director positions at The David Hockney Foundation, the Fine Arts Museums of San Francisco, The Walt Disney Family Museum, and Harvard University Art Museums.

== Early life and education ==
Benefield was born in 1954 in Birmingham, Alabama to parents Bettie Ann Caudle Benefield and Dotson Benefield. He received a Bachelor of Music (1976) and Master of Music (1980) at Baylor University and a Doctor of Musical Arts in 1995 from the New England Conservatory of Music.

== Career ==
=== Early career ===
After working as an instructor in vocal music and a choral director, Benefield became an administrator for the David Winton Bell Gallery at Brown University from 1988-1996. He then moved to the Museum of Art at Rhode Island School of Design where he was the Assistant Director until 1999.

=== Harvard Art Museums ===
At the Harvard Art Museums, he was promoted from assistant director in 1999 to associate director in 2000, and to deputy director in 2002. During that period until 2008, he led the institution to focus on education, outreach to Harvard undergrads, providing resources for teachers, and extending free entry to Cambridge library card holders. He also oversaw planning for the massive renovation of the Fogg Museum.

He organized the 2008 exhibition of Renzo Piano’s design for transformation of the Fogg Art Museum as well as the exhibition Windshield: Richard Neutra’s House for the John Nicholas Brown Family in 2002.

=== Walt Disney Family Museum ===
In 2008, Benefield became the founding executive director of The Walt Disney Family Museum, which opened October 1, 2009 in San Francisco’s Presidio. Along with museum co-founder Diane Disney Miller, oldest daughter of Walt Disney, Benefield helped establish the organization as an institution devoted to academically showcasing the man of Walt Disney rather than the commercial empire under his name. Using the Disney family’s vast personal archives and loans from others, the museum celebrates the history of Disney’s life and the beginnings of his career, encourages scholarship, hosts special exhibitions, and debunks myths like the popular belief that Disney was frozen upon his death.

=== Fine Arts Museums of San Francisco ===
Benefield was the deputy director of the Fine Arts Museums of San Francisco, both the de Young and Legion of Honor, from 2012-2015. In 2015 when the director of museums announced he was leaving FAMSF, the board of trustees voted to appoint Benefield as the acting director until a new director was named in 2016. While working for the Fine Arts Museums, Benefield improved the breadth of technology utilized, such as implementing a museum guide that operates with a refined indoor GPS and is specialized for visitors with Apple watches.

Benefield organized (with curator Gregory Evans) the blockbuster 2013 exhibition David Hockney: A Bigger Exhibition. More than 300 works filled 10 galleries, including multi-camera digital movies displayed on 18 monitors for each movie.

Other exhibitions under Benefield’s organization were Modernism from the National Gallery of Art: The Robert & Jane Meyerhoff Collection (co-curated with Harry Cooper) and Oscar de la Renta: The Retrospective (with curator André Leon Talley).

=== The David Hockney Foundation ===
Based on the success of David Hockney: A Bigger Exhibition and the good relationships he formed with artist David Hockney and curator Gregory Evans, Benefield was asked to be the first executive director of The David Hockney Foundation in 2017. Under his guidance, the nonprofit based in Los Angeles established a website with an extensive chronology of the artist’s life and a searchable artwork database. Benefield also coordinated with many museums hosting exhibitions using loans from the Foundation’s collection, including the massive touring retrospective exhibition of 2017-2018 that traveled to the Metropolitan Museum of Art in New York, Pompidou in Paris, and Tate Britain in London.

=== Richard Benefield Associates, Independent Consultant ===
Since 2010, Benefield has worked as an independent consultant to various institutions, including advising and lecturing at the Monterey Museum of Art and at the Heard Museum of Native American Art for the exhibition David Hockney’s Yosemite. Other projects have included advising the Fred Jones Jr. Museum of Art’s exhibition A Century of Magic: The Animation of Walt Disney Studios.

=== George Rickey Foundation, Inc. ===
On January 1, 2020, Benefield became the first executive director of the George Rickey Foundation, Inc. The Foundation was established in 1993 and became active after the artist’s death in 2002 with the goal of advancing the appreciation and understanding of Rickey’s work and the promotion of scholarship on the artist. George Rickey (1907–2002) is best known for his abstract kinetic sculptures, which poeticize the medium of burnished stainless steel in a transformative manner, bringing them to life with the movement of air and the reflective effects of ambient light. As executive director, Benefield is responsible for advancing the legacy of the artist by encouraging and overseeing publications and exhibitions of Rickey’s work, including a catalogue raisonné of his sculpture. Benefield also oversees all aspects of the care of the Foundation’s collection of Rickey works and the vast archive of his drawings, technical studies, papers, and correspondence, as well as photographs and videos of the sculpture and the sculptor at work.

=== The Ogunquit Museum of American Art ===
In February 2022, Benefield joined The Ogunquit Museum of American Art's Board of Directors.

== Musical career ==
Before working his way toward executive director positions at art museums, Benefield was a musician and music educator. Growing up, he was often found practicing the organ at his local church after school. After graduating with a Master of Music from Baylor University in 1980, he became instructor of vocal music and music history as well as a choral director at Paris Junior College (TX). He then moved on to Boston University (MA) where he was a graduate assistant from 1983-1986. In 1989, he began positions as an Adjunct Instructor of Voice, Special Lecturer in Music, and Choral Director at Providence College (RI). He completed the Doctor of Musical Arts in 1995 from the New England Conservatory of Music. The title of his dissertation was "The Organ-Accompanied Solo Motets of Franck, Gounod, and Saint-Saëns." While working at the Harvard University Art Museums, he was also given the honor as the Keeper of the Organ in Adolphus Busch Hall, made famous by E. Power Biggs, at Harvard University.

== Personal life ==
Richard Benefield married John Kunowski in 2004. They currently reside in Stratham, New Hampshire.

== Selected publications ==
- Oscar de la Renta (editor), San Francisco & New York: Fine Arts Museums of San Francisco and Del Monico | Prestel Books, 2016.
- John Goodman (essay in one-person exhibition catalogue), San Francisco: Elins Eagles-Smith Gallery, 2013.
- David Hockney: A Bigger Exhibition (essay author and editor), San Francisco & New York: Fine Arts Museums of San Francisco and Del Monico | Prestel Books, 2013.
- Picturing The Walt Disney Family Museum (author and editor), San Francisco: The Walt Disney Family Museum, 2010.
- The Walt Disney Family Museum: The Man, The Magic, The Memories (preface and editor), San Francisco: The Walt Disney Family Museum, 2009.
- Lois Orswell, David Smith, and Friends: Works from the Lois Orswell Collection, Harvard University (preface), New York: Knoedler & Company, 2003.
- Motets for One Voice by Franck, Gounod, and Saint-Saëns: The Organ-Accompanied Solo Motet in Nineteenth-Century France (author and editor), Middleton, WI: A-R Editions, Inc., 2003.
- "Daniel Pinkham's The Small Requiem and Advent Cantata," article in The American Organist, March 1993.
- "Cyclic Simplicity in Richard Strauss's Schlichte Weisen, Opus 21" (unpublished).
- "Conflict and Irresolution in the Finale of Mahler's Das Lied von der Erde" (unpublished).
- "The Organ-Accompanied Solo Motets of Franck, Gounod, and Saint-Saëns" (with edition of 31 motets), doctoral dissertation.
- "Clara Schumann and Pauline Viardot: The Two Oldest Friends of the Century" (unpublished).
