= Haeri =

Haeri may refer to the following people:

- Abdolkarim Haeri Yazdi (1859–1937), Iranian cleric
- Kazem al-Haeri (born 1938), Iraqi-born Iranian cleric and grand ayatollah
- Mehdi Haeri Yazdi (1923–1999), Iranian philosopher and cleric
- Morteza Haeri Yazdi (1916–1986), Iranian cleric
- Niloofar Haeri (born 1958), Iranian-American Islamic scholar, anthropologist and linguist
- Safa Haeri (1937–2016), Iranian journalist

== See also ==
- Lee Hae-ri (born 1985), singer and musical theater actress
- Rokni Haerizadeh (born 1978), artist
