= PCMOS =

Semiconductor manufacturing technology

Probabilistic complementary metal-oxide semiconductor (PCMOS) is a semiconductor manufacturing technology invented by Prof. Krishna Palem of Rice University and Director of NTU's Institute for Sustainable Nanoelectronics (ISNE). The technology hopes to compete against current CMOS technology. Proponents claim it uses one thirtieth as much electricity while running seven times faster than the current fastest technology.

PCMOS-based system on a chip architectures were shown to have gains that are as high as a substantial multiplicative factor of 560 when compared to a competing energy-efficient CMOS based realization on applications based on probabilistic algorithms such as hyper-encryption, bayesian networks, random neural networks and probabilistic cellular automata.
