= Brunswick Lion =

Medieval statue of a lion

- Braunschweiger Löwe (German)
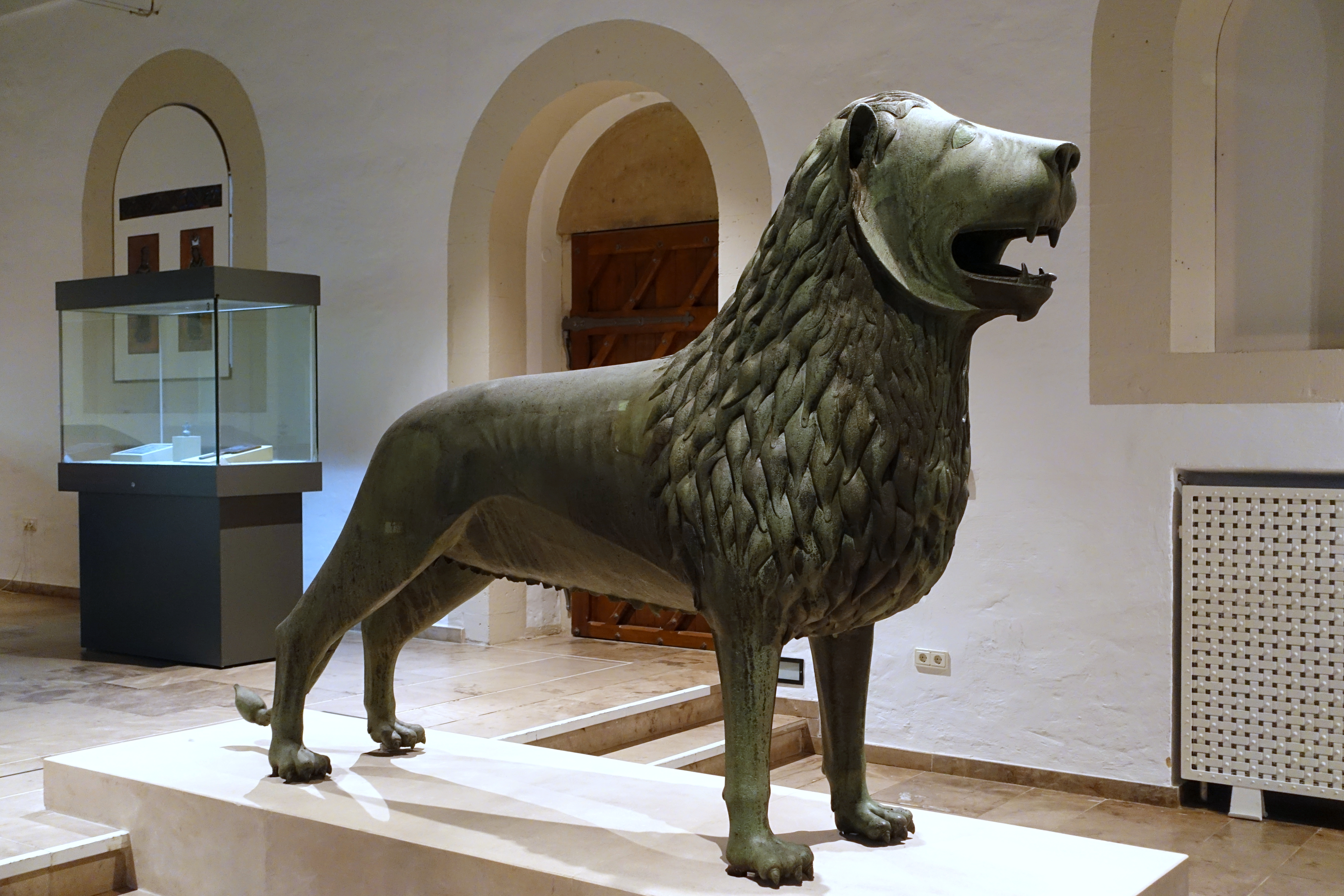
- Year: 1164–1176: original version 1989: current version
- Medium: Bronze
- Location: Dankwarderode Castle, Brunswick; 52°15′53.5″N 10°31′27.0″E

The Brunswick Lion (German: Braunschweiger Löwe) is a medieval sculpture, created in bronze between 1164 and 1176, and the best-known landmark in the German city of Brunswick. The Brunswick Lion was originally located on the Burgplatz square in front of Brunswick Cathedral. The monument was moved to Dankwarderode Castle in 1980, and later replaced at the original location by a replica. Within Brunswick, it is commonly known as the "Castle Lion" (Burglöwe).

== Creation ==
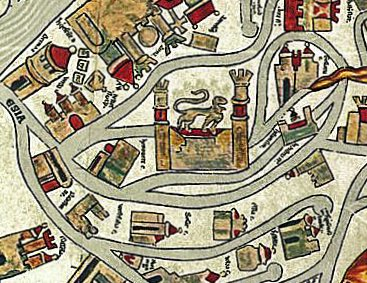
Brunswick and the Brunswick Lion on the Ebstorf Map (around 1300)

The medieval chronicler Abbot Albert of Stade mentioned "1166" as the year of origin. Nevertheless, according to recent research, the monument was created between 1164 and 1176, at the time when the Welf duke Henry the Lion (1129/31–1195), ruler of both Saxony and Bavaria, took his residence at Braunschweig. Newly-married with the English princess Matilda, he had Dankwarderode Castle built in the style of a Kaiserpfalz, rivalling with the nearby Imperial Palace of Goslar. The lion statue was erected in the centre of the castle complex as seigniorial symbol of his ducal authority and jurisdiction, probably also as an expression of Henry's claim to power towards the Hohenstaufen emperor Frederick Barbarossa.

The Brunswick Lion was the first large detached sculpture of the Middle Ages north of the Alps and the first large hollow casting of a figure since antiquity. The bronze casting by an unknown artist, probably from Brunswick, weighs 880 kilogrammes, has a height of 1.78 metres (5.8 ft), a length of 2.79 m (9.2 ft) and a maximum thickness of 12 millimetres. The sculpture was originally gilded.

The Lion's design apparently is modelled on Italian art of sculpture, such as the Capitoline Wolf, the Lion of Saint Mark, or the ancient Equestrian Statue of Marcus Aurelius. Henry may have been inspired during the Italian campaigns he undertook together with Emperor Frederick Barbarossa. The elaborate artistic achievement and naturalistic design of the sculpture indicate the work of a versed goldsmith or bell founder.

== History ==
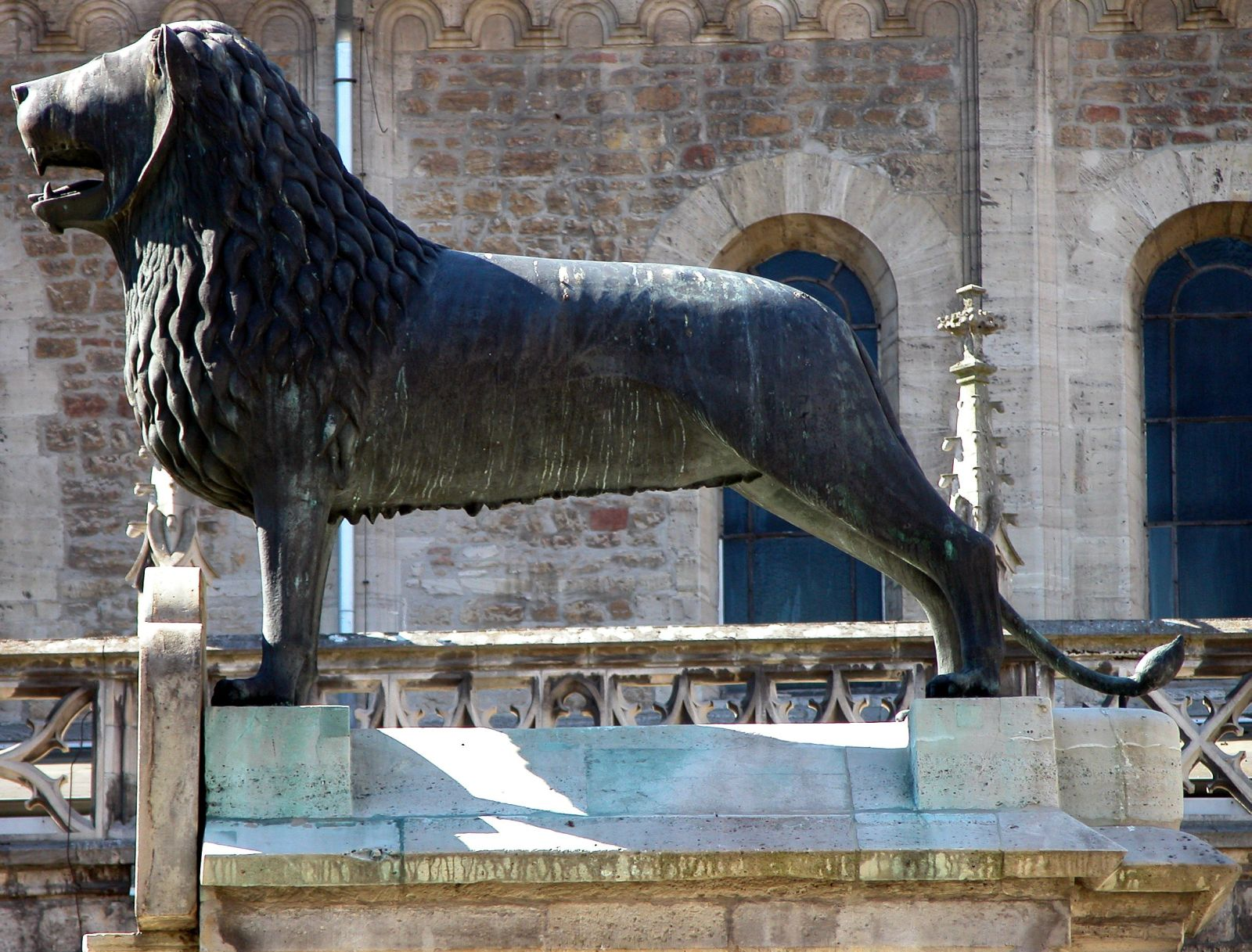
A replica of the Brunswick Lion now stands outside Brunswick Cathedral

The Lion soon became the heraldic animal of Braunschweig; it appeared in the city's seal and on ducal coins. The sculpture and its pedestal were extensively restored in 1616, under the rule of Duke Frederick Ulrich of Brunswick-Wolfenbüttel, after long quarrels with the Braunschweig citizens were settled. During the Napoleonic Wars, it was narrowly rescued from melting down when the Westphalian government prepared for the 1812 Russian Campaign. Another restoration was carried out by the sculptor Georg Ferdinand Howaldt in 1858.

The Braunschweig Büssing automotive company established in 1903 adopted the Lion as a logo mounted on its busses and trucks. Taken over by MAN SE in 1972, the Büssing signet still adorns MAN commercial vehicles.

The threat by strategic bombing during World War II prompted the city administration to replace the original sculpture by a copy already cast in 1937. Kept safe at the Rammelsberg mines in the Harz mountains, the original statue was brought back to Braunschweig by the British occupation forces after the war and re-installed in a festive ceremony.

Finally in 1980, the original statue was removed inside Dankwarderode Castle to protect it from further damages caused by air pollution. A specially manufactured replica has been set up at the original site.

== Legend ==
Shortly after the death of Henry the Lion in 1195, the duke became the subject of a folktale, the so-called Heinrichssage. The tale was later also turned into the opera Enrico Leone by Italian composer Agostino Steffani. The Heinrichssage details a fictional account of Henry's pilgrimage to the Holy Land. A popular part of the tale deals with the Brunswick Lion. According to legend, Henry witnessed the fight between a lion and a dragon while on pilgrimage. He joins the lion in its fight and they slay the dragon. The faithful lion then accompanies Henry on his return home. After its master's death, the lion refuses all food and dies of grief on Henry's grave. The people of Brunswick then erect the statue in the lion's honour.

== Replicas ==
Around the world, but mainly in Germany, there are several replicas of the Brunswick Lion. For example, in front of Ratzeburg Cathedral (erected in 1881), in the interior of Weingarten Abbey, in front of Wiligrad Castle, set up in 1913/14 by John Albert of Mecklenburg (from 1907 to 1913 ruler of the Duchy of Brunswick), disappeared after 1950, in Blankenburg im Harz in 1915 on the terrace of the Great Castle, since 1953 in the Baroque Gardens of the Little Castle and in the Victoria and Albert Museum in London. Other replicas are located here:

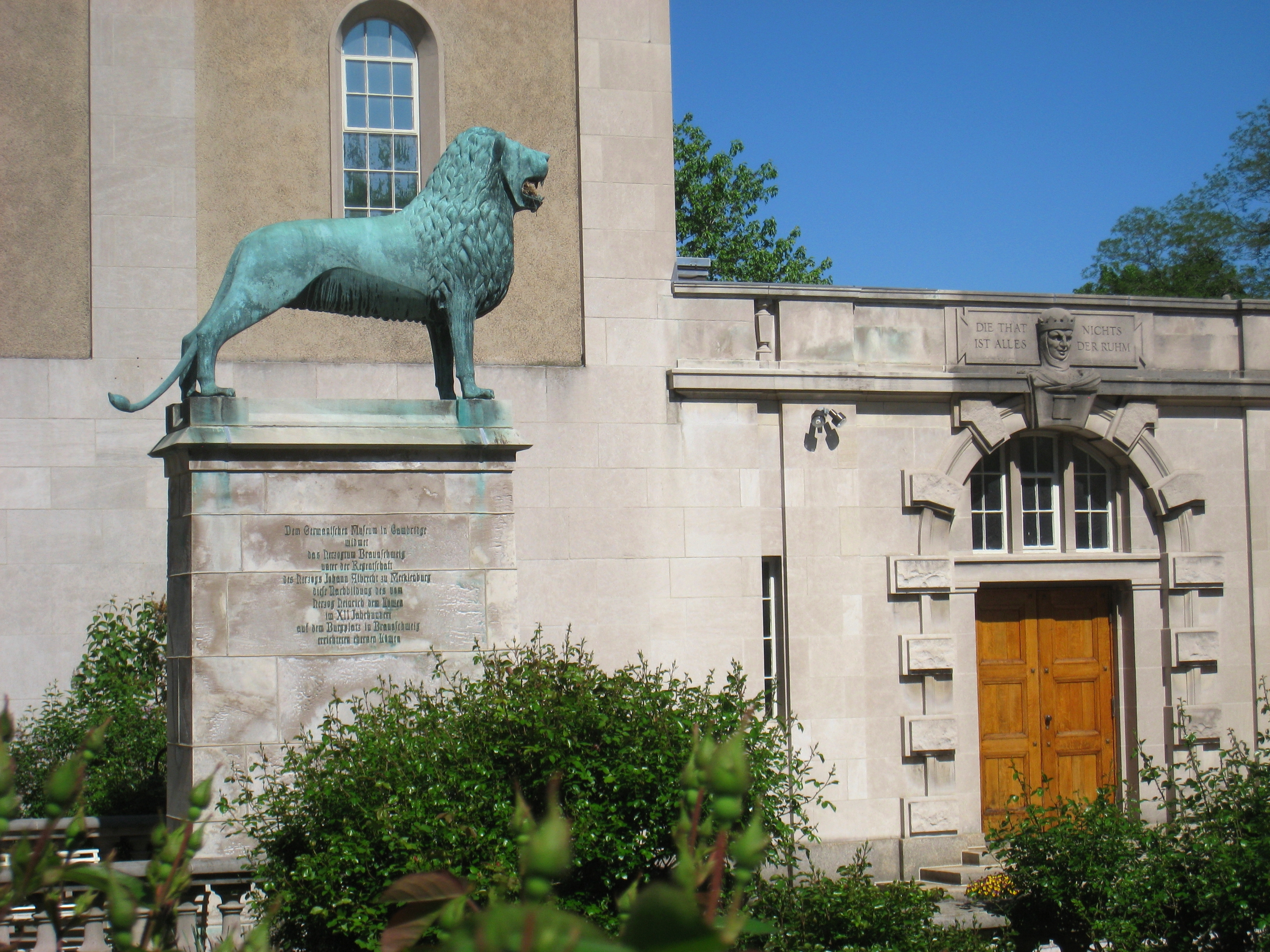
Cambridge, Massachusetts:
Lion in front of Adolphus Busch Hall, Harvard University

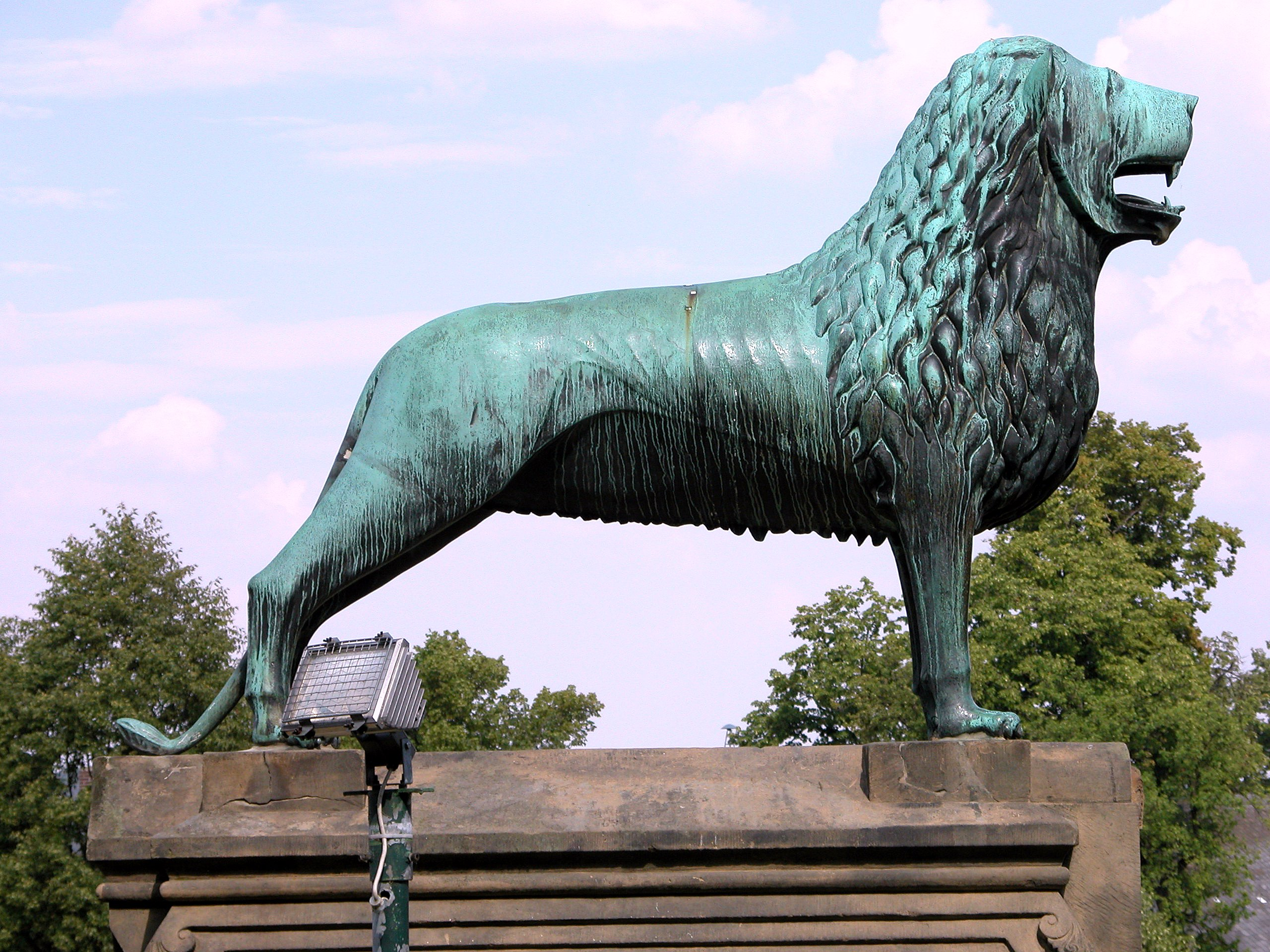
Goslar:
One of the two replica lions from 1900 in front of the Imperial Palace of Goslar

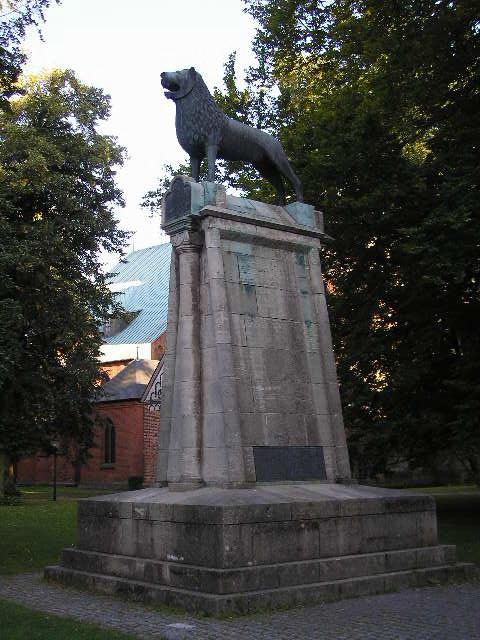
Lübeck:
In front of Lübeck Cathedral since 1975

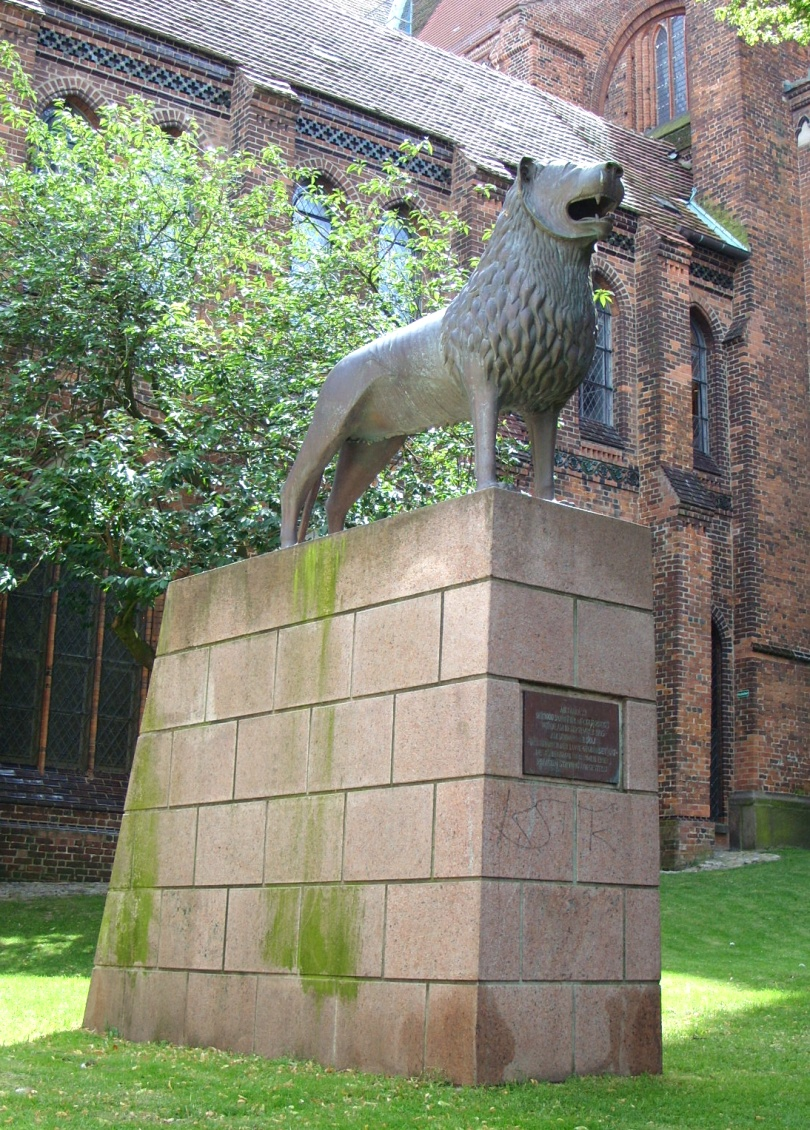
Schwerin:
At Schwerin Cathedral, 1995 on the 1000th anniversary of Mecklenburg

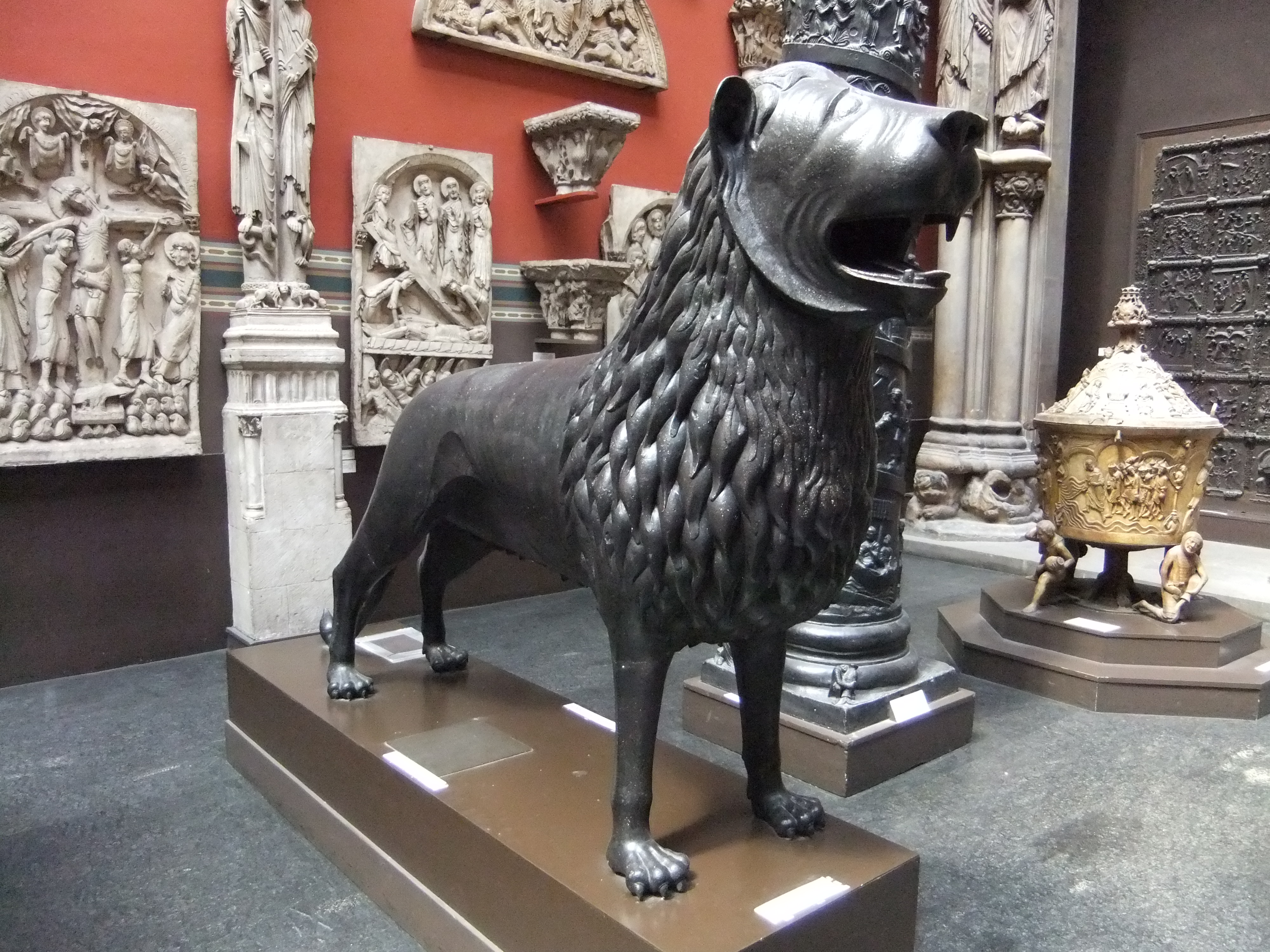
London:
Plaster cast at the Victoria and Albert Museum

== Gallery ==
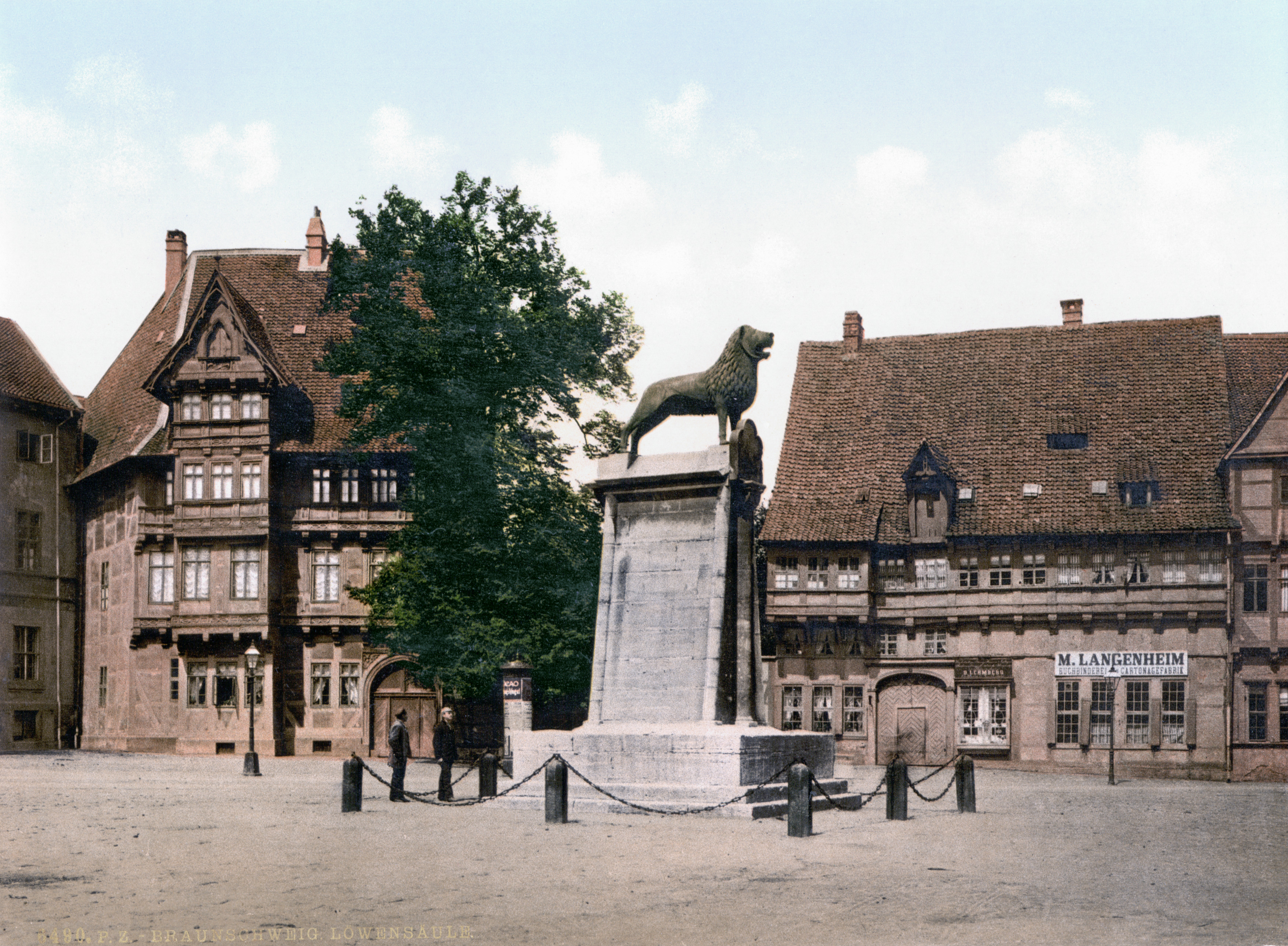
Brunswick Lion in 1900

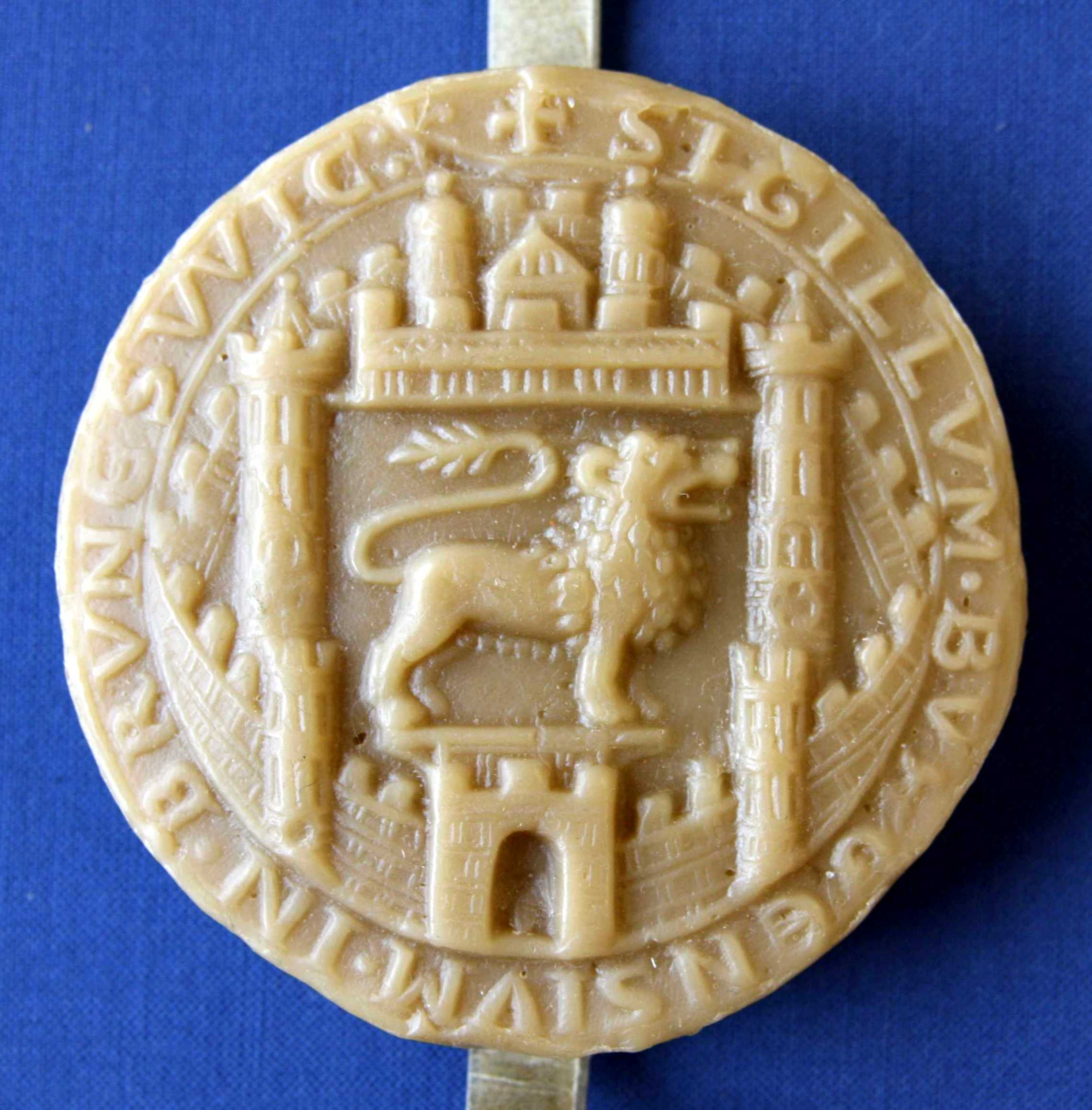
Brunswick Lion on 1231 seal of the city of Brunswick

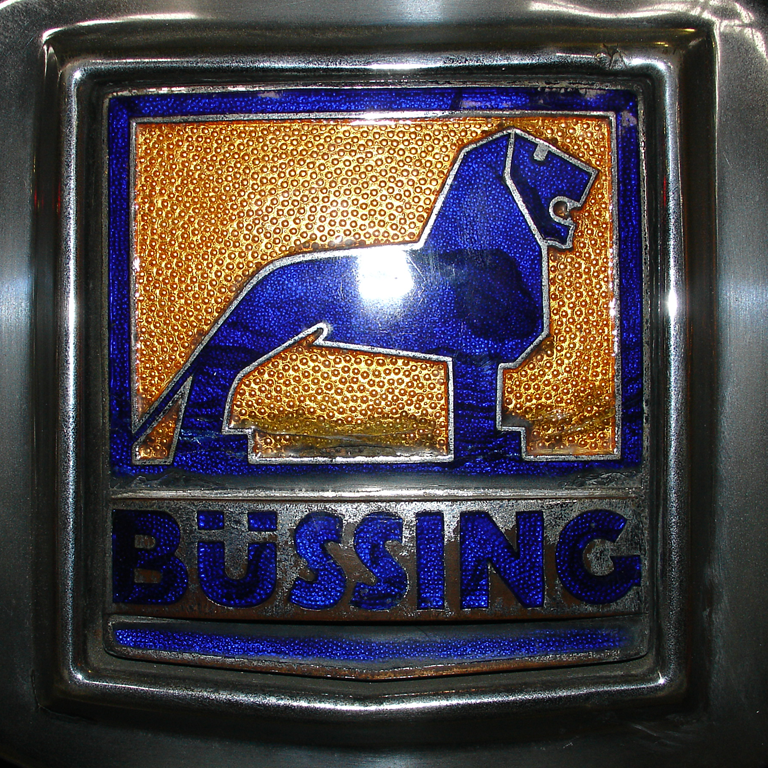
Brunswick Lion on the logo of Büssing

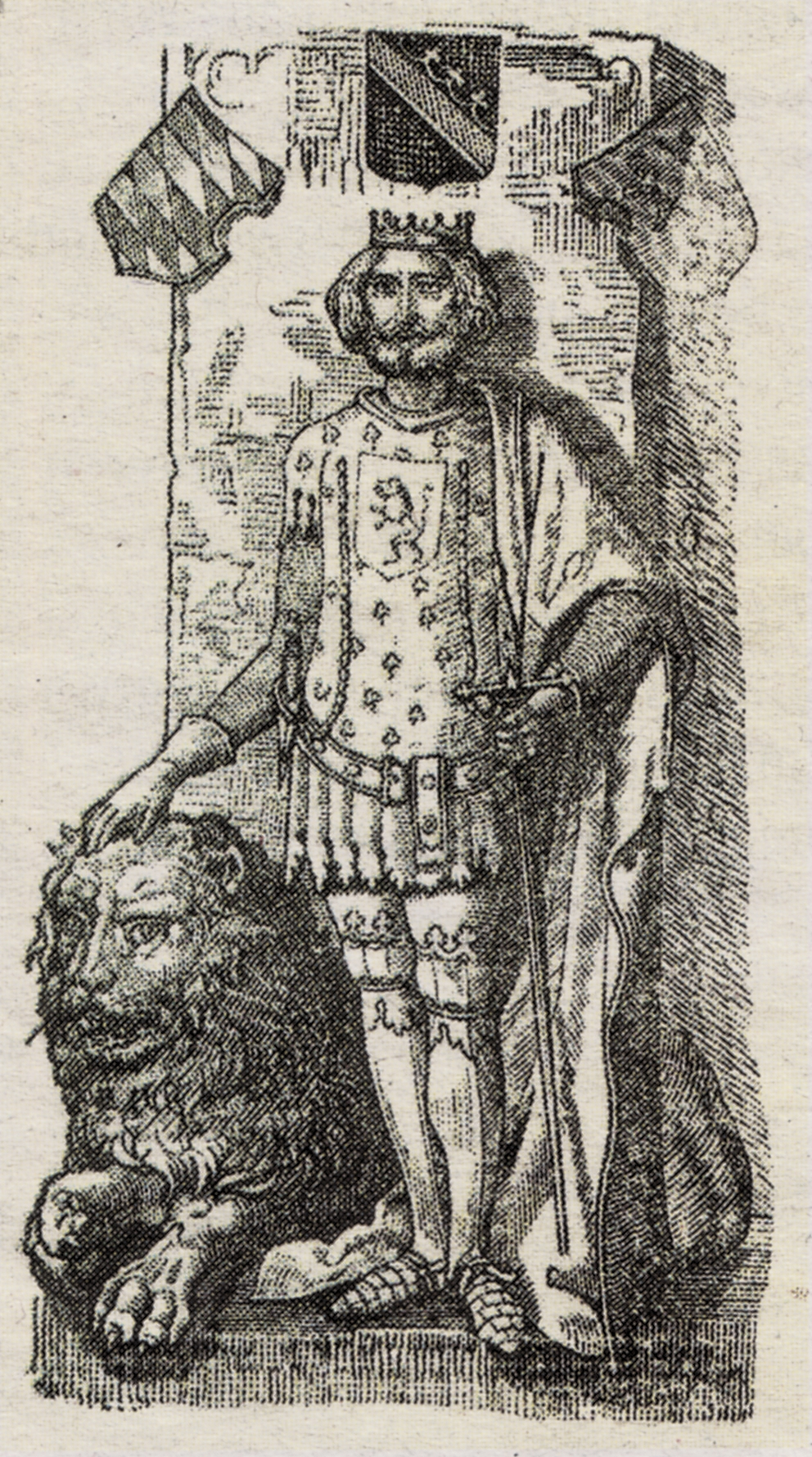
Henry and his lion (title page illustration from Karl Joseph Simrock's retelling of the folktale (1844))

== Sources ==
- Reinhard Bein und Bernhardine Vogel: Nachkriegszeit. Das Braunschweiger Land 1945 bis 1950. Materialien zur Landesgeschichte. Braunschweig 1995
- Braunschweiger Zeitung (Hrsg.): Die 100 größten Braunschweiger, Braunschweig 2005
- Cay Friemuth: Die geraubte Kunst. Der dramatische Wettlauf um die Rettung der Kulturschätze nach dem Zweiten Weltkrieg, Braunschweig 1989
- Martin Gosebruch (Hrsg.): Der Braunschweiger Löwe. Bericht über ein wissenschaftliches Symposion in Braunschweig vom 12.10. bis 15. Oktober 1983. In: Schriftenreihe der Kommission für Niedersächsische Bau- und Kunstgeschichte bei der Braunschweigischen Wissenschaftlichen Gesellschaft. Göttingen 1985
- Mathias Haenchen: Der Sockel des Braunschweiger Löwenmonuments, in: Braunschweigische Heimat – Zeitschrift des Landesvereins für Heimatschutz im Herzogtum Braunschweig, Bd. 84 (1998), S. 8–10
- Karl Jordan, Martin Gosebruch: 800 Jahre Braunschweiger Burglöwe 1166–1966. Braunschweig 1967
- Jochen Luckhardt und Franz Niehoff (Hrsg.): Heinrich der Löwe und seine Zeit. Herrschaft und Repräsentation der Welfen 1125–1235. Katalog der Ausstellung, Braunschweig 1995
- Gerd Spies (Hrsg.): Braunschweig – Das Bild der Stadt in 900 Jahren. Geschichte und Ansichten. Ausstellungskatalog, Braunschweig 1985
- Gerd Spies (Hrsg.): Der Braunschweig Löwe. In: Braunschweiger Werkstücke, Band 62, Braunschweig 1985
- Städtisches Museum Braunschweig (Hrsg.): "Geschichte der Stadt Braunschweig" im Altstadtrathaus. Ausstellungskatalog, Braunschweig 1991
- Reinhart Staats: Der Braunschweiger Löwe in biblischer Bedeutung. In: Quellen und Beiträge zur Geschichte der Evangelisch-Lutherischen Landeskirche in Braunschweig. Heft 10, Wolfenbüttel 2002
