= Thomas Sayers Ellis =

American poet (1963–2025)

- Born: October 5, 1963; Washington, D.C., U.S.
- Died: July 17, 2025 (aged 61); St. Petersburg, Florida, U.S.
- Education: Alabama State University; Brown University
- Occupations: Poet, photographer, musician, bandleader, teacher
- Children: 1

Thomas Sayers Ellis (October 5, 1963 – July 17, 2025) was an American poet, photographer, musician, bandleader and teacher. He previously taught as an associate professor at Case Western Reserve University in Cleveland, Bennington College in Vermont, and also at Sarah Lawrence College until 2012.

== Early life ==
Ellis was born on October 5, 1963, in Washington, D.C., and attended Dunbar High School. He attended Alabama State University, and then moved to Massachusetts. In 1988, he co-founded the Dark Room Collective in Cambridge, Massachusetts, an organization that celebrated and gave greater visibility to emerging and established writers of color. He was the leader and a founding member of the band Heroes are Gang Leaders. Ellis received his M.F.A. from Brown University in 1995.

== Career ==
Ellis was known in the poetry community as a literary activist and innovator, whose poems "resist limitations and rigorously embrace wholeness." His poems have appeared in magazines such as AGNI Callaloo, Grand Street, Harvard Review, Tin House, Columbia: A Journal of Literature and Art, and anthologized in The Best American Poetry (1997, 2001, and 2010) and in Take Three: AGNI New Poets Series (Graywolf Press, 1996), an anthology series featuring the work of three emerging poets in each volume. He has received fellowships and grants from the Fine Arts Work Center, the Ohio Arts Council, the Bread Loaf Writers' Conference, Yaddo, and the MacDowell Colony.

Ellis was a contributing editor to Callaloo. He compiled and edited Quotes Community: Notes for Black Poets (University of Michigan Press, Poets on Poetry Series).

His first full-length collection, The Maverick Room, was published by Graywolf Press and won the John C. Zacharis First Book Award from Ploughshares.

The book takes as its subject the social, geographical and historical neighborhoods of Washington, D.C., bringing different tones of voice to bear on the various quadrants of the city.

He was also the author of a chapbook, The Genuine Negro Hero (Kent State University Press, 2001), and the chaplet Song On (Wintered Press 2005).

Ellis taught at the Iowa Writers' Workshop until 2016, when he left after he was accused of sexual misconduct.

== Personal life and death ==
Ellis had a son.

On July 17, 2025, Ellis died at his home in St. Petersburg, Florida, after an undisclosed respiratory illnesses. He was 61.

== Awards ==
- 2005: Whiting Award
- 2006: John C. Zacharis First Book Award
- 2015: Guggenheim Fellowships for Poetry

== Works ==
- The corny toys. Arrowsmith Press. 2018. ISBN 978-1-64255-027-6.
- Skin Inc.: Identity Repair Poems. Graywolf Press. 2010. ISBN 978-1-55597-567-8.
- The maverick room: poems. Graywolf Press. 2005. ISBN 978-1-55597-414-5.
- The genuine Negro hero. Kent State University Press. 2001. ISBN 978-0-87338-704-0.
- Thomas Sayers Ellis; Larissa Szporluk; Joe Osterhaus (1996). Askold Melnyczuk (ed.). Take three. Graywolf Press. ISBN 978-1-55597-239-4.

=== Anthologies ===
- Camille T. Dungy, ed. (2009). "The Market". Black Nature: Four Centuries of African American Nature Poetry. University of Georgia Press. ISBN 978-0-8203-3431-8.
- Nikky Finney, ed. (2007). "Afronauts". The ringing ear: Black poets lean south. University of Georgia Press. ISBN 978-0-8203-2925-3.
- William J. Walsh, ed. (2006). "Zapruder; View of the Library of Congress; Ways to be Black in a Poem". Under the rock umbrella: contemporary American poets, 1951-1977. Mercer University Press. ISBN 978-0-88146-047-6.
- Charles H. Rowell, ed. (2002). "Fatal April". Making Callaloo: 25 years of Black literature. Macmillan. ISBN 978-0-312-28898-3.
- Michael Collier, ed. (2000). "Practice: For Derek Walcott". The new American poets. UPNE. ISBN 978-0-87451-964-8.
- Maggie Anderson; David Hassler, eds. (1999). "Stayed Back". Learning by heart: contemporary American poetry about school. University of Iowa Press. ISBN 978-0-87745-663-6.
- James Tate; David Lehman, eds. (1997). "Atomic Bride". The Best American Poetry 1997. Simon and Schuster. ISBN 978-0-684-81452-0.
