= Dankwarderode Castle =

- Burg Dankwarderode
- Braunschweig
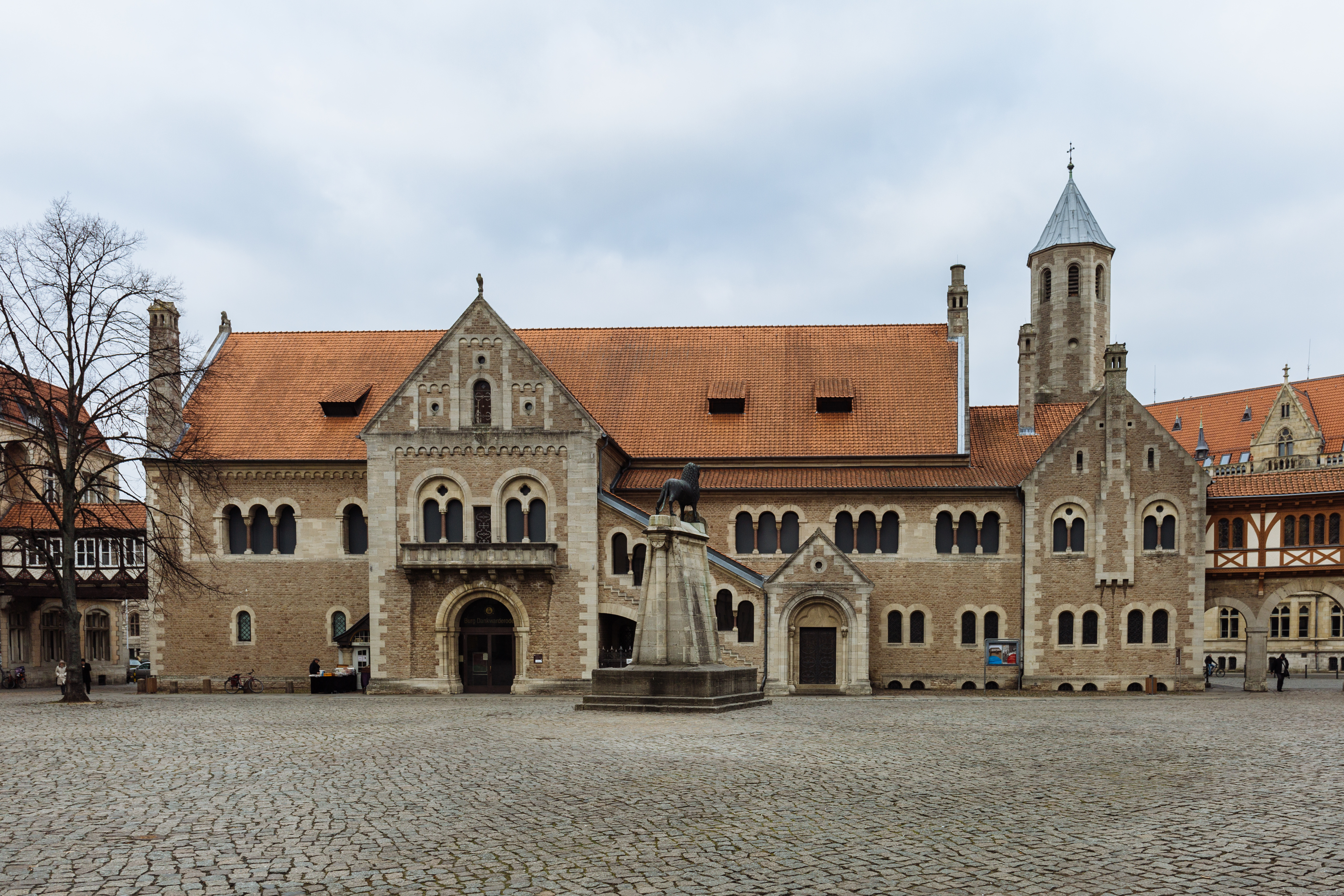
- Burg Dankwarderode

Site information
- Type: lowland castle
- Code: DE-NI
- Condition: Reconstruction from the 19th/20th centuries

Location
- Location within Lower Saxony Location within Germany
- Coordinates: 52°15′53″N 10°31′27″E

Site history
- Built: 12th century

Garrison information
- Occupants: higher nobility

Museum Burg Dankwarderode
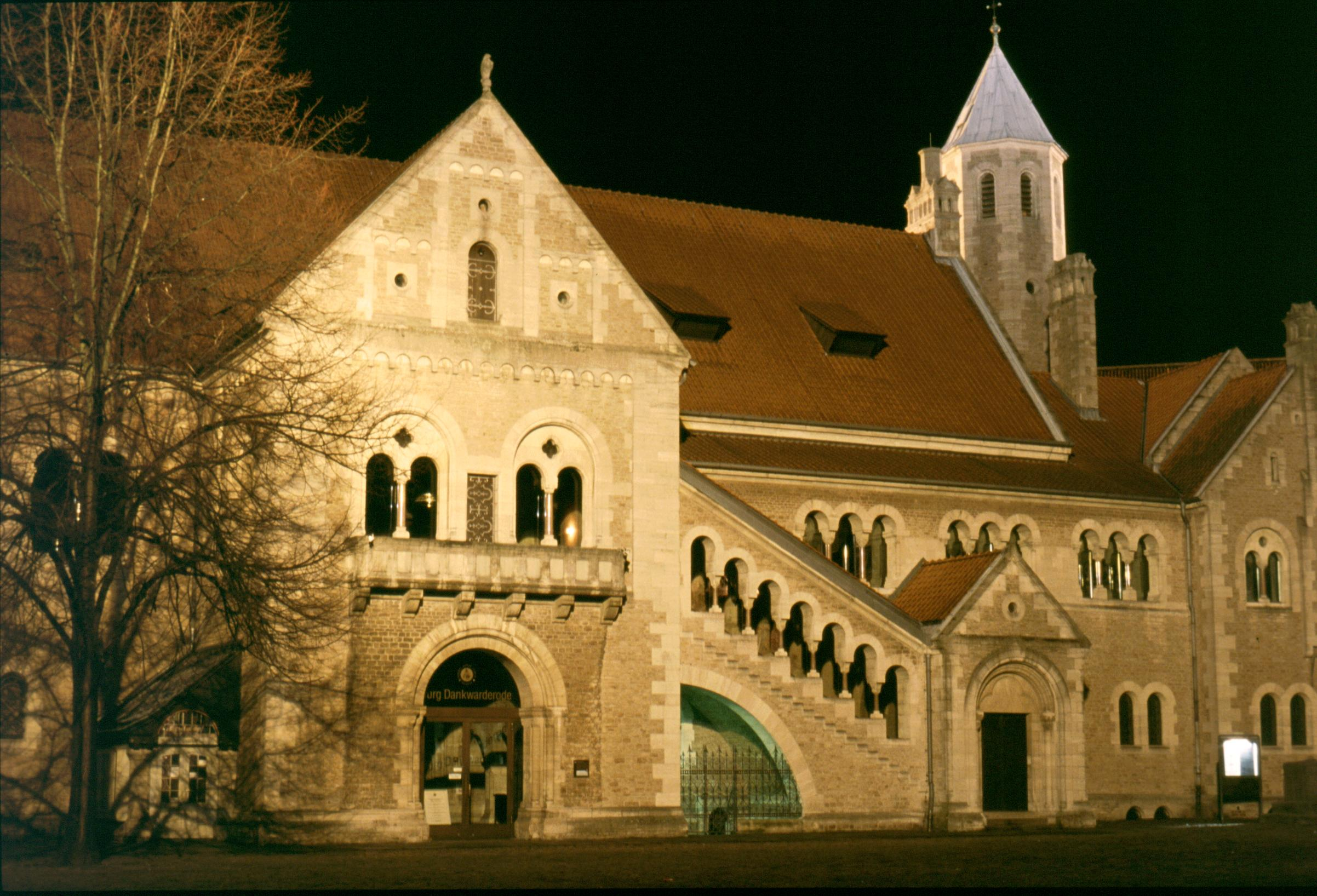
- Dankwarderode Castle, rebuilt 1887–1906
- Established: 1963
- Location: Brunswick
- Type: Medieval Division of the Herzog Anton Ulrich Museum
- Architect: Ludwig Winter (Reconstruction 1887–1906)
- Owner: Niedersächsische Landesmuseen Braunschweig
- Website: http://www.haum.niedersachsen.de

Dankwarderode Castle (German: Burg Dankwarderode) on the Burgplatz ("castle square") in Braunschweig (Brunswick) is a Saxon lowland castle. It was the residence of the Brunswick dukes for centuries and, today, is part of the Herzog Anton Ulrich Museum.

== Construction and history of use ==
Dankwarderode Castle was built between c. 1160 and 1175 as the Pfalz of Duke Henry the Lion on an island in the river Oker. Next to the castle, the construction of Brunswick Cathedral began in 1173. The castle lost its military significance as a defensive structure early when it became surrounded completely by the growing city.

During the 15th century, the dukes of Brunswick-Wolfenbüttel moved their Residenz out of the city and to the nearby town of Wolfenbüttel. In 1616 the palas was remodelled in the Renaissance style, while the rest of the castle was demolished or left to decay. During the 19th century, the castle keep served as a barrack, with plans to demolish it stopped by public protests in 1873. The present structure was rebuilt in 1887 by Ludwig Winter, based on archaeological investigations. Today the ground floor of Dankwarderode Castle houses the permanent collection of medieval objects from the Herzog Anton Ulrich Museum.

== Gallery ==
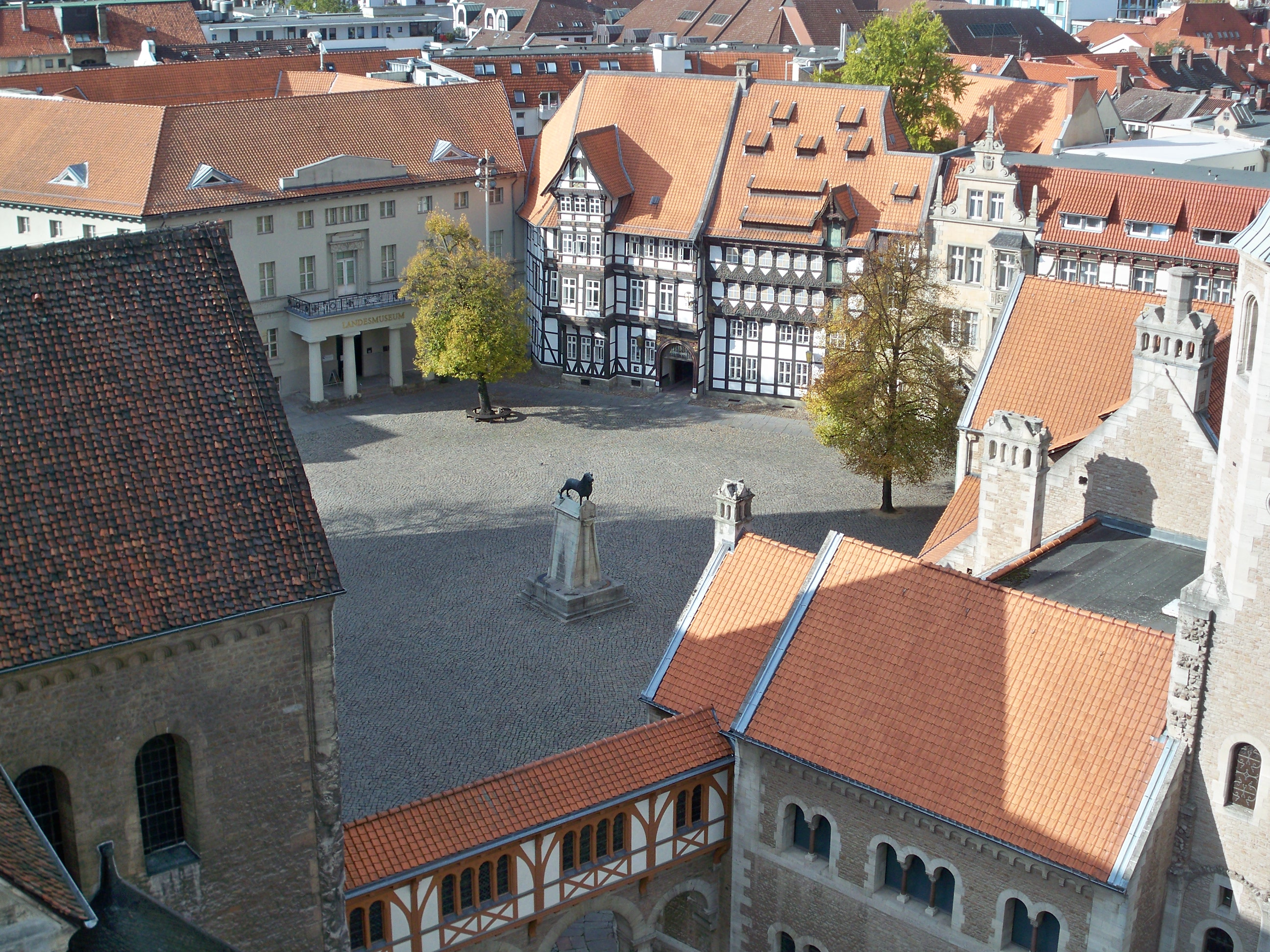
Castle courtyard

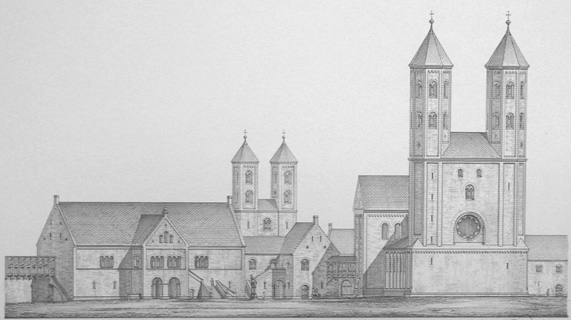
Dankwarderode Castle c. 1200, artist's impression by Ludwig Winter (1884)

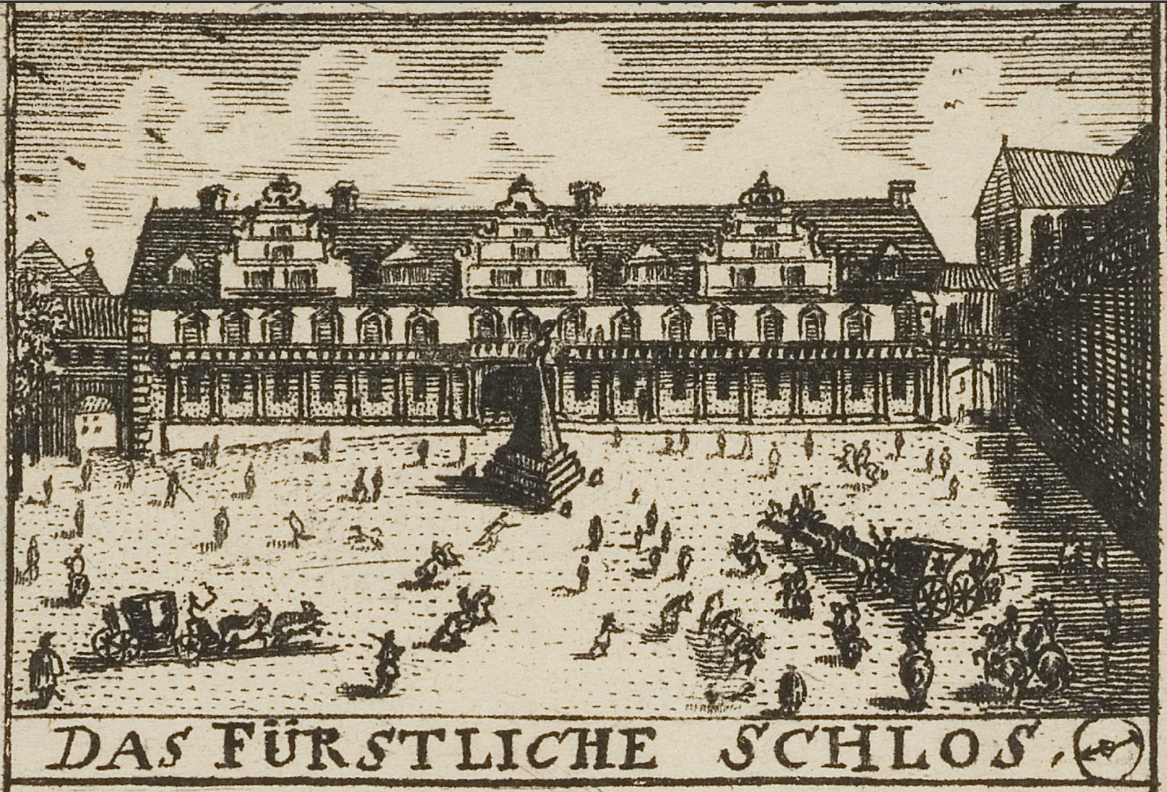
Dankwarderode in the 18th century

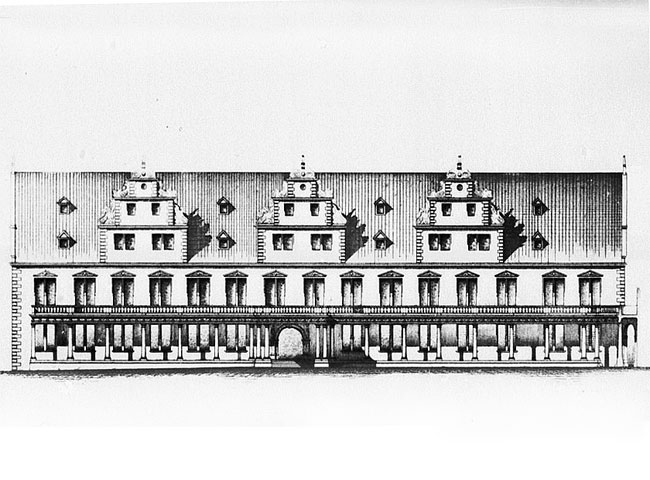
Dankwarderode c. 1720

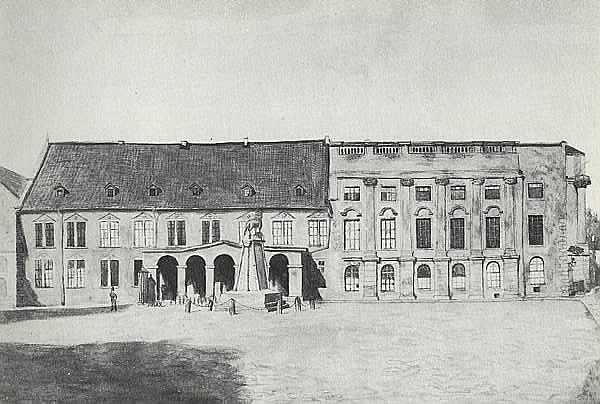
Dankwarderode c. 1865

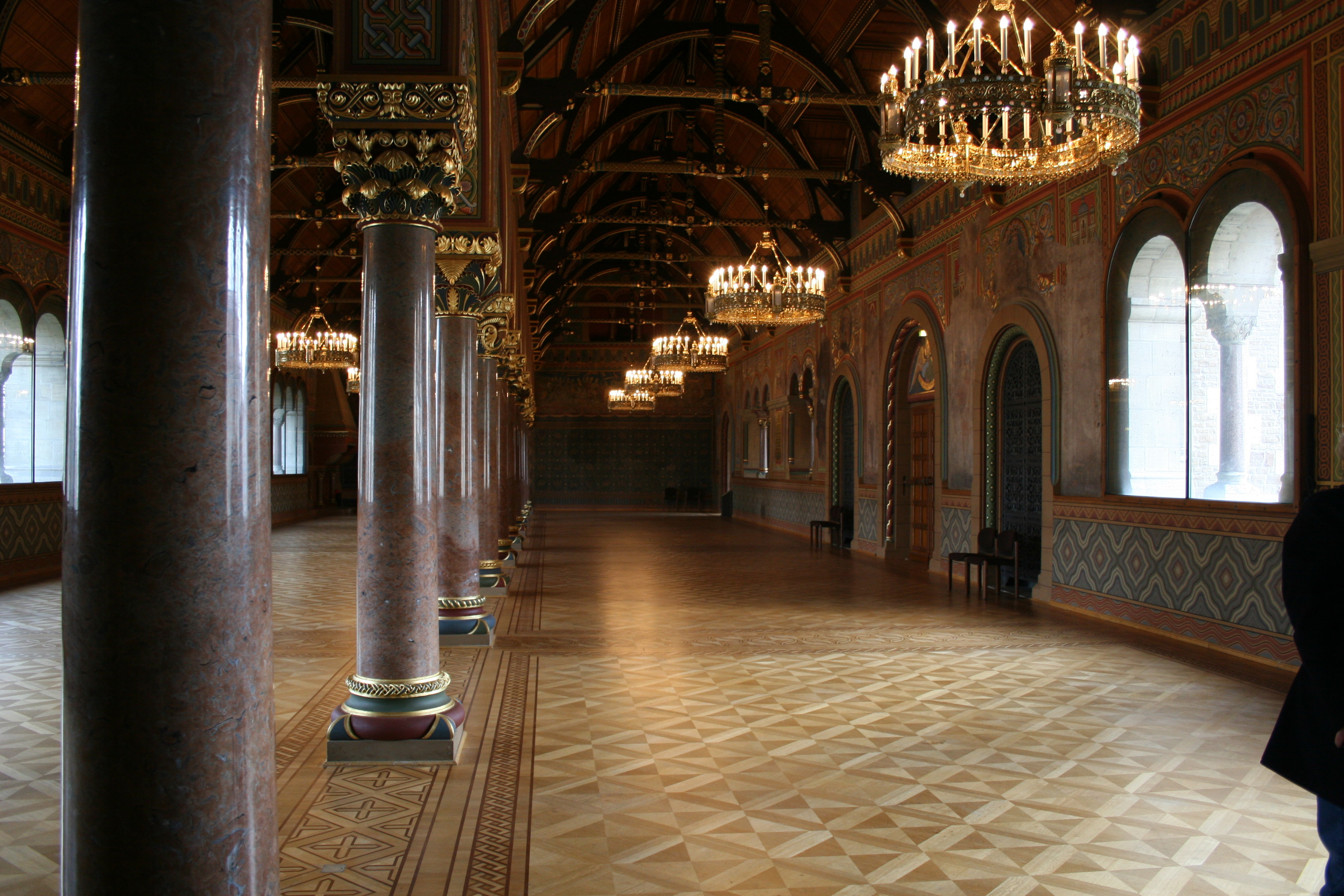
Great Hall

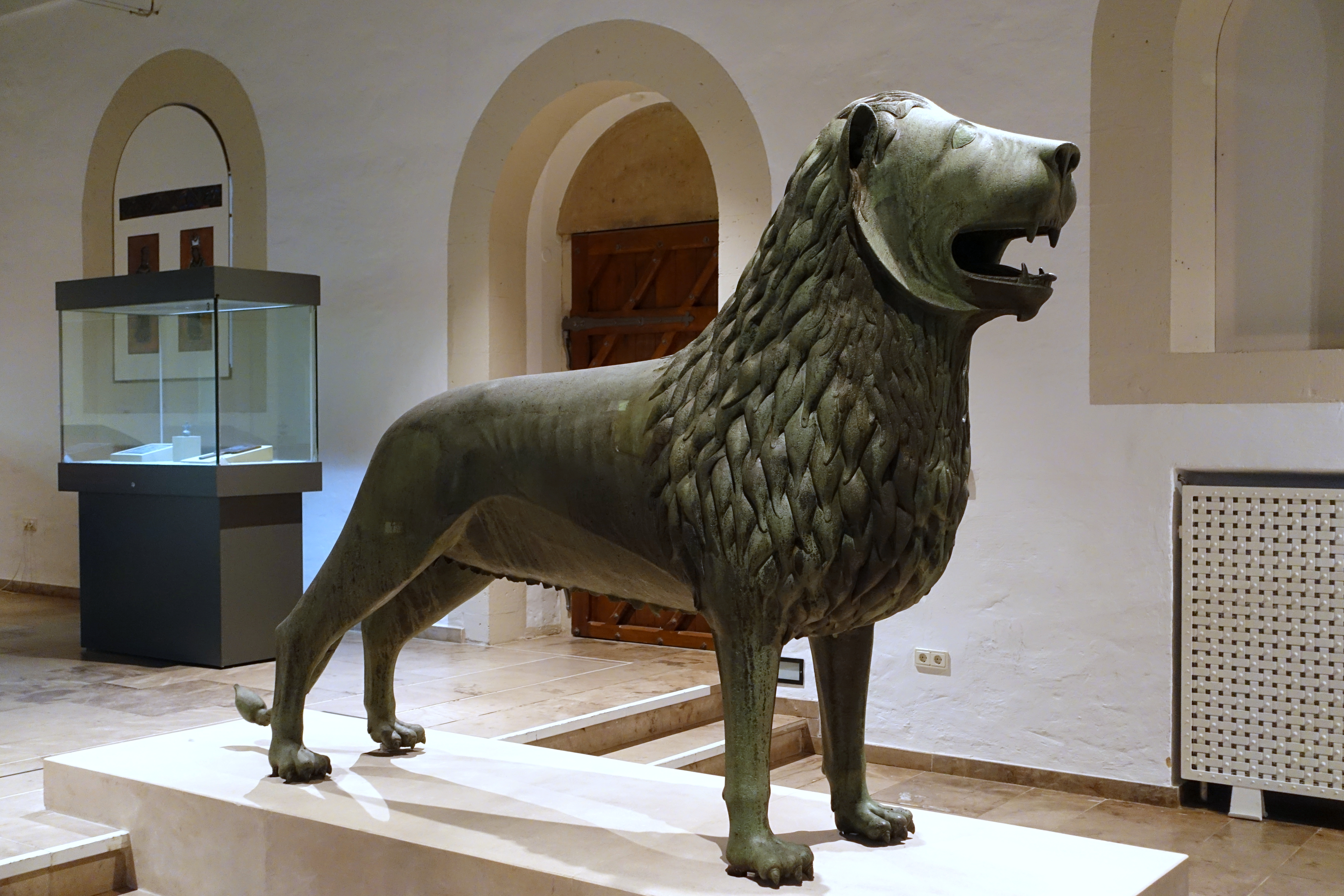
Brunswick Lion, original on display in the museum.

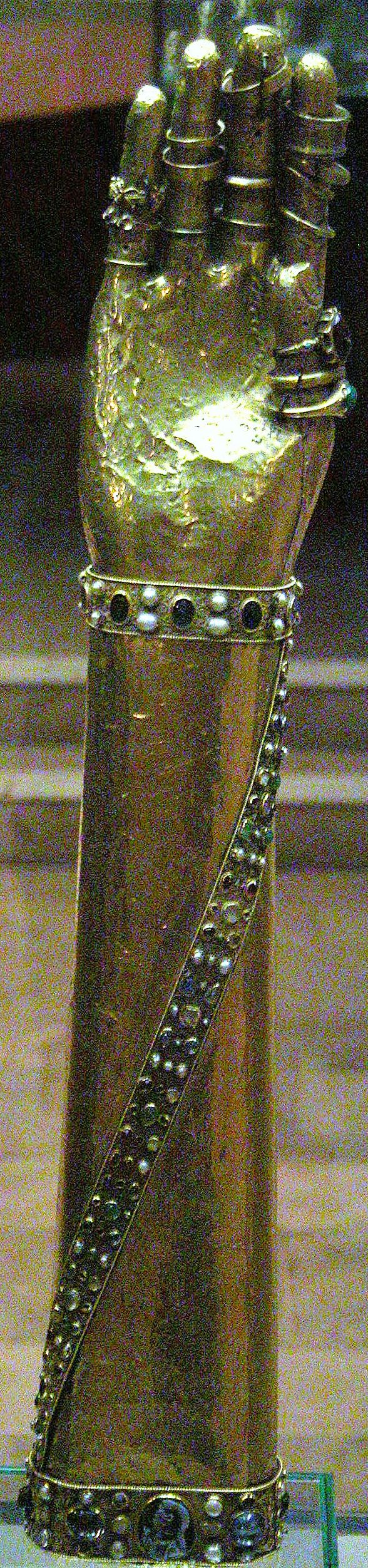
Arm reliquary of Saint Blaise on display in the museum.

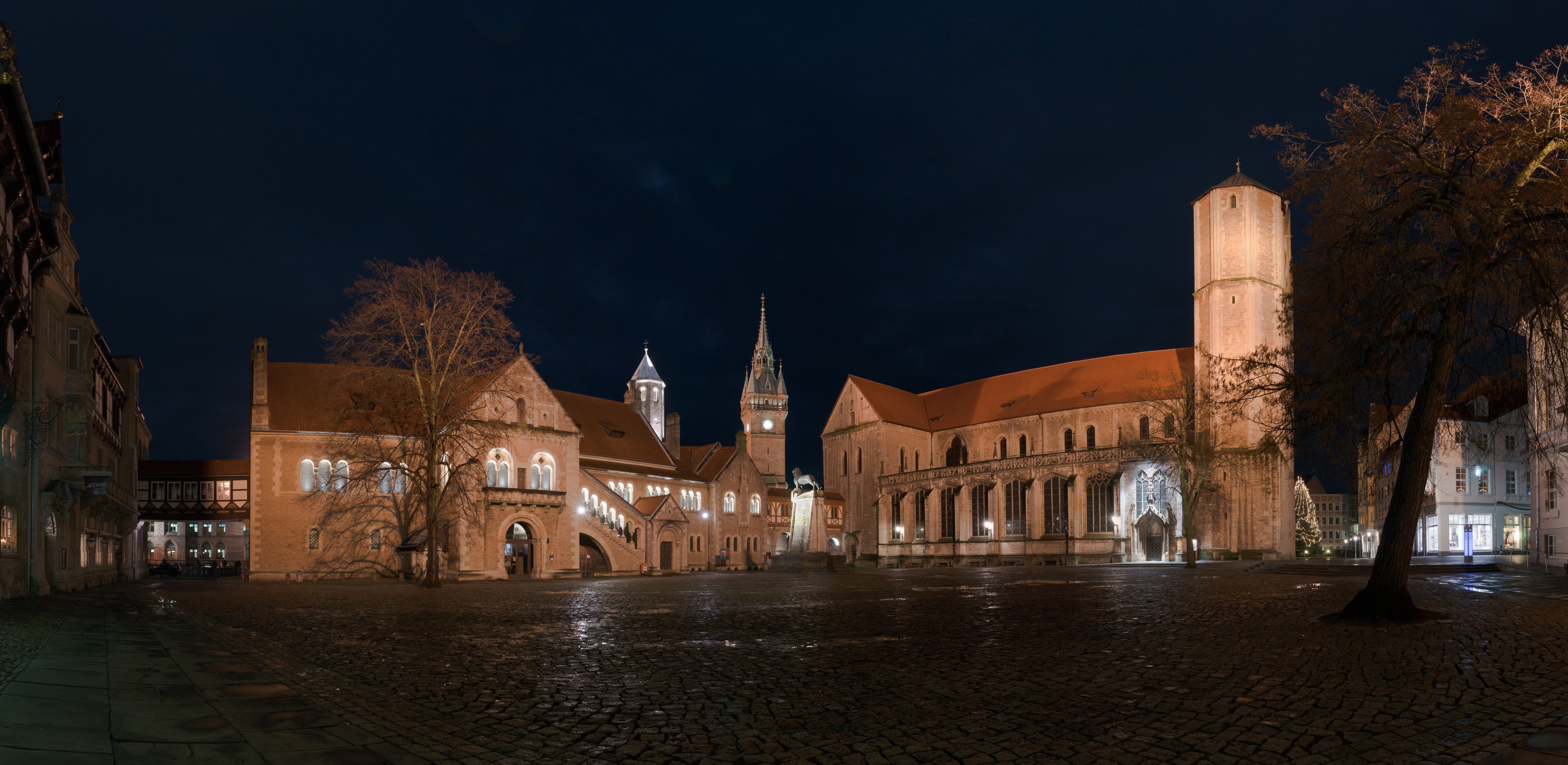
Dankwarderode Castle on the Burgplatz by night.

== Sources ==
- Reinhold Wex: Burg Dankwarderode, in: Braunschweiger Stadtlexikon, herausgegeben im Auftrag der Stadt Braunschweig von Luitgard Camerer, Manfred R. W. Garzmann und Wolf-Dieter Schuegraf unter besonderer Mitarbeit von Norman-Mathias Pingel, Brunswick, 1992, page 52, ISBN 3-926701-14-5.
- Georg Dehio: Handbuch der deutschen Kunstdenkmäler, Bremen/Niedersachsen, Deutscher Kunstverlag, 1977.
- Richard Moderhack: Braunschweiger Stadtgeschichte, Brunswick, 1997.
