= Amanda Church =

American visual artist

- Born: Poughkeepsie, New York, United States
- Education: New York Studio School, Bennington College
- Known for: Painting
- Awards: Guggenheim Fellowship, Pollock-Krasner Foundation, New York Foundation for the Arts
- Website: Amanda Church

Amanda Church, Split, oil on canvas, 32" x 36", 2019.

Amanda Church is an American artist known for abstract paintings that reference the human figure and other discernible elements. Her works straddle representational and formalist art traditions, suggesting recognizable body parts, objects, and perspectival elements in an otherwise abstract field. Church's distinctive use of contrasting style elements has been consistently noted by critics such as Hyperallergic's Cora Fisher, who described Church's work as "whimsically overruling the left-right brain dichotomy as well as the traditionally gendered axis that divides geometric and decorative art." Church received a Guggenheim Fellowship in 2015 and a Pollock-Krasner Foundation grant in 2017, among other awards. Her work has been covered in publications such as The New York Times, The Boston Globe, ARTnews, Hyperallergic and Forbes Magazine. Her paintings have been exhibited in major U.S. cities as well as internationally, in galleries and museums such as the Brooklyn Museum of Art and the Aldrich Museum. She lives and works in New York.

== Life and career ==
Born in Poughkeepsie, New York, Church has spent much of her life in and around New York City. She received a degree in Painting and Drawing from Bennington College in Vermont, which included one year of study at the New York Studio School in Manhattan. She began participating in area group shows by 1995, the first being "Ooze" at Black and Herron in Soho. Her first solo exhibitions were at Galerie du Tableau (Marseille, 1997 and 2000) and Clifford Smith Gallery (Boston, 1999). During this time she was also featured in pop, figurative-themed and other group shows at the Brooklyn Museum of Art, the Aldrich Museum, Hallwalls, and the Newhouse Center for Contemporary Art. Since then, Church has shown throughout the United States and in London, Milan, Brussels, Copenhagen, Istanbul and Prague, including solo shows at Michael Steinberg Fine Art and High Noon Gallery (New York), Julie Chae Gallery (Boston), and Jancar Gallery (Los Angeles). In addition to her artmaking, Church has contributed reviews to art publications such as ARTnews, Art in America, Flash Art, and Art on Paper. She has also co-curated exhibitions at Smack Mellon, Cuchifritos Gallery and Plus Ultra Gallery, receiving coverage in The New York Times, The New Yorker and Time Out.

In 2003, she was invited to participate in a fashion-art collaboration project organized by the Italian luxury fashion house Fendi in partnership with the New Museum. Fendi commissioned Church and other contemporary artists to embellish its Chef handbag, to be auctioned at a benefit later that year. She also designed her own line of beachwear, Mandy Pants, based on her paintings. These designs were featured at the Bass Museum in Miami during the Art Basel fair in 2010.

Amanda Church, The High Life, oil on canvas, 60" x 48", 1999.

== Work ==
Church is best known for essentially abstract oil-on-canvas paintings that allude to real-world elements, including—frequently—the human form. Her work bridges established art traditions, combining elements from representational movements such as Pop and Surrealism with an abstract modernist approach. Her post-pop, post-minimal style is noted by art critics for its layered, dialectical references, for example in the juxtaposition of biomorphic forms which are flesh-like in shape and color against more angular, purely abstracted shapes and lines. The paintings are flat in their use of color, with strong lines and frequent use of outlining.

Ambiguity—visual and spatial, as well as semiotic—is a running theme in Church's paintings, and her work is often described in dichotomous terms such as "distinct yet universal" or "distant yet familiar." A frequent subject of commentary is the emotional tension suggested by Church's use of light-hearted elements, such as a cartoon-like aesthetic, to depict potentially unsettling scenes of distorted and disembodied limbs. Critic John Yau described Church's paintings as "disarming and disturbing," while Adam Lehrer of Forbes Magazine called them "fun but simultaneously uncomfortable." Erotic elements are also prevalent, with Church's use of line, color, narrative and even perspective connoting sexual suggestiveness for many observers.

Church has described her artwork as "anthropomorphized pop extractions," and in her first decade of work, these often appeared as self-contained protozoan subjects set at some distance against flat, monochrome backdrops—for example in The High Life (1999), which she showed in an early solo exhibition at Clifford Smith Gallery in Boston. Cate McQuaid of The Boston Globe described Church's works in that show as "funky, biomorphic geometries [that] squirm against flat, bright backgrounds, hinting at humanity." Some early subjects evoked creamy desserts for reviewers, including one that New York Times art critic Ken Johnson likened to abstracted ice cream.

Amanda Church, Man with a Big Heart, oil on canvas, 72" x 80", 2010.

These scenes morphed over time into canvases with divided, multicolor backgrounds featuring an interplay of subjects with a greater number of protuberances, such as those displayed in "Three Strong Painters" (Maryland Institute of Art, 2002, curated by John Yau) and her solo exhibition, "Liquid Love" (Michael Steinberg Fine Art, 2006).

Later works feature even more complex compositions of curvy, disembodied limbs and torsos together with geometric abstractions. For example, in the Copenhagen show, "Minimal Baroque" (2014), Church exhibited Man with a Big Heart (2010), which places a "mini-Mondrian grid" in a field of curvilinear, organic shapes, some resembling genitalia. The later works also take a cropped, closer view of their figurative subjects, mirroring the intimacy and abstraction inherent in viewing objects or people at close range. Church's solo exhibition "Heads and Tales" (2015) at Espacio 20-20 in Puerto Rico featured shapes reminiscent—some simultaneously—of heads and buttocks at various close-up distances (e.g., Eggheads, 2014). In 2016, her contribution to the group show "Territory" at Crush Curatorial included close views of finger-like protuberances.

Her solo exhibition "Recliners" (High Noon Gallery, 2019) featured magnified views of humanoid curves in geometric settings. With titles such as "Voyeurs" and "Bedheads," many of the paintings suggest erotic scenarios with what art writer Adam Simon called a "winking" subtlety. In his review, Simon wrote that "closely cropped curves and rectangles, architecture, and folds of flesh conjure a situation that is either very familiar or vaguely recognizable…The erotic close-up, the camera zoomed in on parts of bodies, flesh and furniture, cue your mind to complete the picture."

== Public Recognition ==
Church has received awards from the Pollack-Krasner Foundation and New York Foundation for the Arts (both 2017), the Guggenheim Foundation (2015), and the Danish Arts Foundation (2014), among others. Her work belongs to public and private collections, including the Bondardo Collection (Italy), Deutsche Bank, the Jiménez-Colón Collection and the New Jersey State Museum.
