= Adolphus Busch Hall =

Building at Harvard University

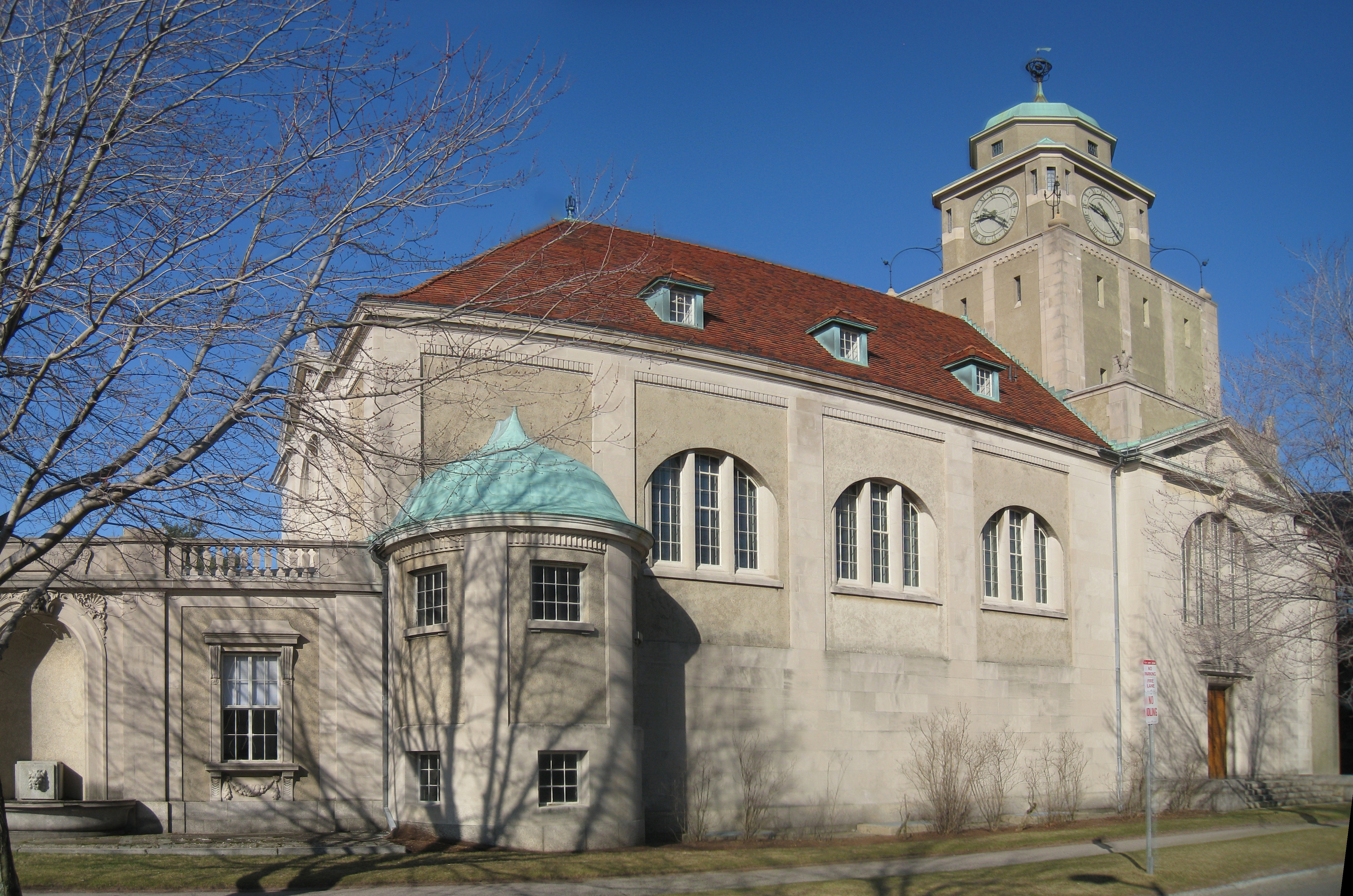
- Adolphus Busch Hall
- Interactive map of the Adolphus Busch Hall area

General information
- Location: Harvard University, 29 Kirkland Street, Boston
- Coordinates: 42°22′36.5″N 71°6′50.9″W
- Current tenants: Busch-Reisinger Museum collection; Minda de Gunzburg Center for European Studies
- Named for: Adolphus Busch
- Construction started: 1912
- Completed: 1917
- Opened: 1921
- Cost: $265,000
- Owner: Harvard University
- Governing body: Harvard Faculty of Arts and Sciences

Design and construction
- Architect: German Bestelmeyer
- Known for: Display of a copy of the Brunswick Lion

Adolphus Busch Hall is a Harvard University building located at 27 Kirkland Street in Cambridge, Massachusetts. It is named for brewer and philanthropist Adolphus Busch, former president of the Anheuser-Busch company, who contributed $265,000 to its building fund.

The hall was designed by architect German Bestelmeyer to house Harvard's Germanic Museum. Its cornerstone was laid in 1912 and the building completed in 1917, but it was not opened to the public until 1921, officially because of a lack of coal.

The Germanic Museum evolved into the Busch-Reisinger Museum, the only museum in North America dedicated to the study of art from the German-speaking countries of Central and Northern Europe. The Busch-Reisinger was located in Adolphus Busch Hall from 1921 to 1991 and the hall continues to house the Busch-Reisinger's founding collection of medieval plaster casts, as well as an exhibition on the history of the museum.

The hall also hosts concerts on its Flentrop pipe organ, which was made famous by organist E. Power Biggs, who broadcast and recorded his long-playing records there.

The hall is also home to Harvard's Minda de Gunzburg Center for European Studies. Its courtyard contains a copy of the Brunswick Lion.

== See also ==
- Harvard Art Museums
- Busch-Reisinger Museum
