= Miles Coolidge =

Miles Coolidge (born 1963 in Montreal, Quebec) is a Canadian-American photographer and art-educator who teaches as a professor at the University of California, Irvine. Known for his focus on subjects that blur the line between architecture and landscape, Coolidge's work has also been known to engage the viewing space through its use of scale, in combination with its subject matter. His photographic projects have been exhibited internationally in numerous galleries and museums. He lives and works in Los Angeles, California.

== Education ==
Coolidge obtained a bachelor's degree from Harvard University in 1986, and a Master of Fine Arts degree from the California Institute of the Arts in 1992. He also studied for a year as a post-graduate student with Bernhard Becher at the Kuntakademie Düsseldorf in 1993–4.

== Exhibitions ==
=== Solo (museum) ===
- Orange County Museum of Art, Irvine, CA (2000)
- Ulrich Museum of Art, Wichita, KS (2001)
- Harwood Museum, Taos, New Mexico (2004)

=== Group (museum) ===
NRW-Forum Düsseldorf (Germany), Las Vegas Art Museum, Metropolitan Museum of Art (New York City), Shanghai Museum of Art, California Museum of Photography, Los Angeles County Museum of Art, Museum of Contemporary Art (Los Angeles), Kunsthaus Graz (Austria), Guggenheim Museum (Bilbao), Guggenheim Museum (New York), Contemporary Museum (Baltimore), Pasadena Museum of California Art, Museum of Contemporary Art (Chicago), Fisher Gallery (USC, Los Angeles), Fotomuseum Wintertur (Switzerland), Nederlands Fotos Instituut, University Art Museum, CSULB (Long Beach, CA), Ursula Bickele Stiftung (Germany), MASS MoCA (Massachusetts), Kunsthalle Krems (Austria), Long Beach Museum of Art (California), Aldrich Museum of Art, (Connecticut), Institute of Contemporary Art (London), SFMOMA (San Francisco), Walker Art Center (MN), Carnegie Museum of Art (Pittsburgh), Albright-Knox Gallery (Buffalo, NY), Santa Monica Museum (CA).

Coolidge's work has also been shown in solo and group exhibitions in a variety of commercial galleries in the United States and Europe (for example, ACME., Los Angeles; Casey Kaplan, New York; Victoria Miro, London; Gisela Capitain, Cologne). He is represented by ACME., Los Angeles.

== Bodies of work ==
- 1989 America By Numbers
- 1992 Garage Pictures
- 1992-4 Elevator Pictures
- 1994-6 Safetyville
- 1996-8 Central Valley
- 1998 Moundbuilders' Golf Course
- 1999 Mattawa
- 2000 Mound Postcard Posters
- 2000 Ancient History
- 2002 Observatory Circle
- 2003 Instead of a Bridge
- 2003 Drawbridges
- 2006 Accident Investigation Site
- 2007 Wall of Death
- 2007 Street Furniture
- 2011- Mock-Ups

== Collections ==
Examples of Miles Coolidge's artwork can be found in a variety of museum collections, such as the Metropolitan Museum of Art (New York), the Museum of Contemporary Art (Los Angeles), the Los Angeles County Museum of Art, the Guggenheim Museum (New York), the Albright-Knox Gallery (Buffalo, New York), The San Francisco Museum of Modern Art, the Orange County Museum of Art (Newport Beach, CA), the Edwin A. Ulrich Museum of Art (Wichita State University, Wichita, Kansas), the Henry Art Gallery (Seattle, Washington) and the Art Gallery of New South Wales, (Sydney, Australia).

== Public Projects ==
Coolidge was commissioned by the Broward County (Florida) Cultural Division to create a large-scale permanent photographic work of art for the Southwest Terminal of the Fort Lauderdale/Hollywood International Airport. Installed in 2003 and titled Instead of a Bridge, the 1' by 360' artwork consists of 20 panoramic photographs of cul-de-sacs in nearby residential neighborhoods. Also in 2003, Coolidge was asked to create a public project (Hauptplatz Graz) for the Austrian Triennial of Photography. In 2002 he was commissioned by the Socrates Sculpture Park in Queens, New York to design a billboard for the park's entrance, titled The Serpent Mound, Adams County, Ohio. Also in 2002, he created a large scale reproduction of a 1909 hand-tinted postcard of The Serpent Mound in Ohio.

== Critical Surveys ==
In addition to exhibition reviews in newspapers and art journals, three critical surveys of his work have been published: "Nowheresville", by Helen Molesworth, in Frieze, Jan/Feb 1999; "Space Probes", by Kathleen Magnan, in World Art, May, 1999; and "Miles Coolidge", by Nadja Rottner, in Camera Austria #76 (2001).
