= Christiane Lemke =

German professor

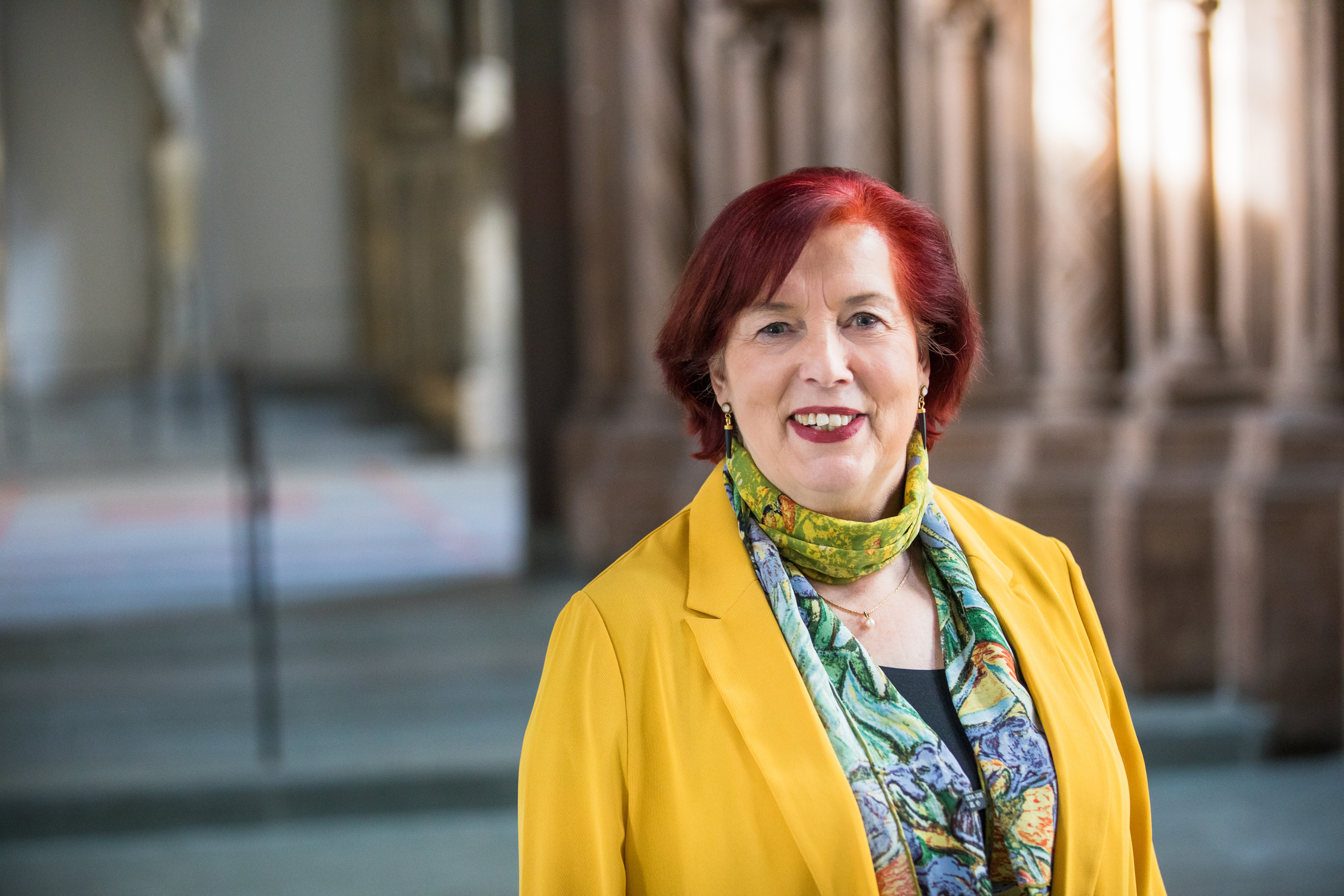
- Lemke
- Born: 10 October 1951 (age 75); Grünendeich, Nether saxony, Germany
- Occupation: Professor
- Website: https://www.ipw.uni-hannover.de/de/christiane-lemke/

Christiane Lemke is a German politician and professor of political science. She holds the chair in international relations and European studies at Leibniz University Hannover. In 1991–1992, she was a Visiting Krupp Chair in the department of government at Harvard University and from 2010 to 2014 she held the Max Weber Chair at New York University. She is currently also a visiting professor at the University of North Carolina at Chapel Hill.

Lemke was the first woman in Germany to serve as the director of the state parliament in Lower Saxony.

== Education ==
Christiane Lemke studied sociology, psychology and political science and went on to earn her Ph.D. in philosophy at the Free University of Berlin. In 1983–84 she was a John F. Kennedy Memorial Fellow at the Minda de Gunzburg Center for European Studies at Harvard University. She completed her Habilitation in 1989 at the Freie Universität Berlin and received the venia legendi in political science.

== Academic work ==
In her early work, Lemke studied East Germany, including the developments leading up to the fall of the Wall. Together with Gary Marks she wrote “The Crisis of Socialism in Europe” (Duke University Press, 1991) reflecting upon the sweeping changes brought about by the collapse of communism. Subsequently, she devoted her work to the democratic transformation of East Central European countries, the integration of Europe, citizenship, and the enlargement of the European Union.

She is the author of Internationale Beziehungen. Grundkonzepte, Theorien und Problemfelder (4th edition, de Gruyter Oldenbourg, 2018) and Germany Today. Politics and Policies in a Changing World (with Helga Welsh, Rowman and Littlefield, 2018). She also published several articles on the European Union and edited the series Europe as a Political Space (LIT Verlag) with publications on human rights and migration in Europe and European common defense and security policy.

She has also published articles and books on transatlantic relations, US politics and US elections. She is a frequent commentator on German radio and TV, including Phoenix TV, ARD and ZDF as well as in international news media.

Christiane Lemke was the director of the Jean Monnet European Center of Excellence at Leibniz University Hannover, where she held the Jean Monnet Chair.

She was a DAAD visiting professor at the University of North Carolina at Chapel Hill where she taught as adjunct professor in the Transatlantic Masters’ program. She was also a distinguished visiting professor at Suffolk University in Boston. In 2019, she was a visiting scholar at Harvard University. She lectured at the University Cambridge and at universities in Paris, Siena, Stockholm, Warsaw and the Institute for Human Sciences in Vienna. In addition, she has traveled extensively in Asia and the Pacific, including China, India, Nepal, Japan, Australia and New Zealand.

== Other accomplishments ==
In 2000, Christiane Lemke was one of the founding professors for the International Women's University (ifu) in Hannover, Germany. In 2010, she was a finalist in the elections for president of the Freie Universität Berlin.

== Select publications ==
- Internationale Beziehungen: Grundkonzepte, Theorien und Problemfelder, fourth edition, Berlin: deGruyter Oldenbourg Publishers 2018 (International Relations. Concepts, Theories, and Key Issues)
- Germany Today: Politics and Policies in a Changing World, Lanham: Rowman and Littlefield 2018 (with Helga A. Welsh)
- Richtungswechsel. Reformpolitik der Obama-Administration, Wiesbaden: VS Verlag 2011 (Change. Reform Politics of the Obama-Administration)
- Europäische Außen- und Sicherheitspolitik, series „Europa als politischer Raum“, Vol. 3, Münster: LIT publishers 2010 (ed. with Volker Epping and Alim Baluch) (European Foreign and Security Policy)
- Menschenrechte und Migration, series „Europa als politischer Raum, Vol. 2, Münster: LIT publishers 2009 (with Heike Brabandt et.al.) (Human Rights and Migration)
- Konstitutionalisierung und Governance in der EU: Perspektiven einer europäischen Verfassung, Reihe „Europa als politischer Raum“, Münster: LIT publishers 2006 (editor with Ines Katenhusen, Jutta Joachim) (Governance and Constitutionalisation)
- Amerikabilder: US-Politik zwischen Moralisierung und Macht, Münster: LIT Verlag 2005 (American Politics: Moralization and Power)
