= Laurence T. Maloney =

Laurence T. Maloney is an American psychology professor at New York University’s Department of Psychology and Center for Neural Science. He is known for applying mathematical models to human behavior.

Maloney has a master's degree in mathematical statistics from Stanford University in 1982, and a doctorate in psychology, also from Stanford, in 1985. During his doctoral semester he studied with Brian Wandell Amos Tversky, and Ewart Thomas. His doctoral thesis was on surface color perception and color constancy.

He was appointed an assistant professor at the University of Michigan, Ann Arbor in Psychology and in Electrical Engineering and Computer Science in 1985. He joined NYU as Assistant Professor in 1988, and was promoted to Associate Professor in 1990, and to Full Professor in 2004. He has been a visiting professor at the universities of Freiburg, Giessen, Paris, and Padova.

Maloney has conducted studies in the physics and mathematics of color vision that resulted in two highly cited articles in the Journal of the Optical Society of America. (Note: According to Google Scholar, it has been cited 923 times.) Previously, his work in visual-cue combination led to a frequently cited review article in Vision Research. (Note: According to Google Scholar, it has been cited 977 times.)

Maloney and his colleagues have studied color perception and surface material perception in complex, three-dimensional scenes, human performance in perceptual and movement tasks equivalent to economic games, and face perception. Recently, his studies on movement planning and decision making under risk are a contribution to the newly emerging field of neuroeconomics.
