= Sheila N. Patek =

American biologist and professor

- Born: Sheila Nadine Patek
- Education: Harvard University (A.B.), Duke University (Ph.D.)
- Known for: Research on ultrafast animal movements
- Awards: Guggenheim Fellowship (2015), NSF CAREER Award, George A. Bartholomew Award
- Scientific career
- Fields: Biomechanics, Evolutionary biology
- Workplaces: Duke University

Sheila Nadine Patek is an American biologist and professor at Duke University, specializing in the biomechanics and evolutionary biology of rapid movements in animals. She serves as the Deputy Editor-in-Chief of the Journal of Experimental Biology.

== Education and career ==
Patek earned her A.B. in Biology from Harvard University and her Ph.D. in Biology from Duke University. She conducted postdoctoral research at the University of California, Berkeley, before joining the faculty at Duke University, where she leads the Patek Lab in the Department of Biology.

== Research ==
Patek's research focuses on the mechanics and evolutionary biology of ultrafast movements in animals. Her work on mantis shrimp revealed that their appendages can strike with extreme speed and force, producing cavitation bubbles that contribute to their powerful impact. She has also studied the rapid jaw movements of trap-jaw ants and the sound production mechanisms in spiny lobsters.

== Honors and awards ==
Patek has received several honors, including:

- Guggenheim Fellowship in Organismic Biology & Ecology (2015)
- NSF CAREER Award
- George A. Bartholomew Award from the Society for Integrative and Comparative Biology

== Public engagement ==
In 2007, Patek delivered a TED Talk titled "The shrimp with a kick!" discussing her research on the mantis shrimp's rapid strike. She has also contributed essays and appeared in media discussions emphasizing the importance of basic scientific research.

== Selected publications ==
- Patek, S. N. (2015). "The Most Powerful Movements in Biology." American Scientist, 103(5), 330–337.
- Biewener, A. A., & Patek, S. N. (2018). Animal Locomotion. Oxford University Press.
