= Niloofar Haeri =

Iranian-American linguist and anthropologist

Niloofar Haeri (Persian: نیلوفر حائری) is an Iranian-American anthropologist and linguist. She is a professor in the Department of Anthropology and the Program Chair in Islamic Studies at Johns Hopkins University.

== Biography ==
Haeri received her BA and PhD in linguistics at the University of Pennsylvania. Her dissertation on gender and linguistic innovation was written under the supervision of William Labov, Gillian Sankoff, and Charles Ferguson.

Her 2021 book, Say What Your Longing Heart Desires: Women, Prayer, and Poetry in Iran (Stanford University Press), won two awards: The American Academy of Religion Award for Excellence in the Study of Religion: Constructive-Reflective Studies, and The Middle East Studies Association Fatema Mernissi Book Award for outstanding scholarship in studies of gender, sexuality, and women's lived experience.

She is the author and co-editor of several books and articles on Egypt and Iran. Her first book, published in 1997, is titled: The Sociolinguistic Market of Cairo: Gender, Class and Education. Her second book on Egypt, titled Sacred Language, Ordinary People: Dilemmas of Culture and Politics in Egypt, is an ethnography of the co-existence of Egyptian Arabic and Classical Arabic. It is also a study of the modernization of Classical Arabic and poses the question: What is a modern language and can a language be both sacred and modern at once?. Co-edited and co-authored works of hers include: Structuralist Studies in Arabic Linguistics: Charles A. Ferguson's Papers, 1954-1994 (with A. Belnap, 1997); New Perspectives in Arabic Linguistics (with E. Bannamoun and M. Eid, 1998); Langue, Religion, et Modernité dans l’Espace Musulman (with C. Miller, 2008).

Haeri was the Marta Sutton Weeks Fellow (2015–2016) at the Stanford Humanities Center. She was also a Guggenheim Fellow in 2015–2016.

She won the Johns Hopkins Discovery Award in 2019 along with Professors Anne Eakin Moss and Narges Bajoghli for their project entitled "Invitation to the masses: The Russian and Iranian Revolutions and their Arts of Persuasion."

== Publications ==
- 2021: Say What Your Longing Heart Desires: Women, Prayer & Poetry in Iran. Stanford University Press.
- 2011: Translation into Arabic of Sacred Language, Ordinary People, with Arabic preface. National Center for Translation, Ministry of Culture, Egypt. Elham Eidarous, translator.
- 2008: Langue, religion et modernité dans l'espace Musulman. Guest edited with Catherine Miller. Special issue of Revue des mondes musulmans et de la Méditerranée (REMMM).
- 2003: Sacred Language, Ordinary People: Dilemmas of Culture and Politics in Egypt. Palgrave Macmillan, New York. Reprinted 2007.
- 1998: New Perspectives in Arabic Linguistics. Philadelphia, Amsterdam: John Benjamin Publishers. Co-edited by N. Haeri, A. Benamoun and M. Eid.
- 1997: Structuralist Studies in Arabic Linguistics: Charles A. Ferguson's Papers, 1954-1994. Studies in Semitic Languages and Linguistics, Leiden, New York, Köln: E. J. Brill. Co-written and co-edited with K. Belnap.
- 1997: The Sociolinguistic Market of Cairo: Gender, Class, and Education. London, New York: Kegan Paul International.
