= Mary D. Lewis =

American historian

- Born: California, U.S.

Academic background
- Education: University of California, Davis (BA); New York University (MA, PhD)
- Thesis: The company of strangers: Immigration and citizenship in interwar Lyon and Marseille. (2000)

Academic work
- Institutions: Harvard University

Mary Dewhurst Lewis is the Robert Walton Goelet Professor of French History at Harvard University. She was co-president of the Society for French Historical Studies in 2012.

== Early life and education ==
As a native of California, Lewis earned her Bachelor of Arts degree from the University of California, Davis in 1991. Upon earning her undergraduate degree, she spent two years working for the U.S. Department of Education in its Office for Civil Rights. She then attended New York University for her Master's degree and PhD. Growing up, she became interested in French history when her father would relate stories of his time there working in the offices of the Marshall Plan.

== Career ==
Upon earning her PhD, Lewis joined the faculty at Harvard University as a tenure-track professor in 2002. As an assistant professor, she accepted an American Council of Learned Societies (ACLS) Fellowship to research The Company of Strangers: Immigration and Citizenship in Interwar France. She was soon promoted to the John L. Loeb Associate Professor of the Social Sciences in 2006. During her early years at the school, Lewis published her first book titled The Boundaries of the Republic: Migrant Rights and the Limits of Universalism in France, 1918-1940, which was the co-winner of the 2008 James Willard Hurst Prize. The book focused on the influx of immigrants France experienced after the First World War and how the country dealt with it. She discovered that although France established Europe's first guest worker program, their policies championed inequality and let to economic and political hardships for immigrants. She later published Necropoles and Nationality: Land Rights, Burial Rites, and the Development of Tunisian National Consciousness in the 1930s.

Following the publication of her first book, Lewis was granted tenure by Harvard and appointed co-president of the Society for French Historical Studies. She published her second book in 2013 titled Divided Rule: Sovereignty and Empire in French Tunisia, 1881-1938 through the University of California Press. The book focused on French rule in Tunisia from the 1880s to the mid-20th century. Two years later, she accepted an ACLS Frederick Burkhardt Residential Fellowships for Recently Tenured Scholars to research The First French Decolonization: A New History of Nineteenth-Century Empire. Lewis also received a Guggenheim Memorial Foundation Fellowship to study European and Latin American history. In 2019, she was appointed a senior scholar of the Harvard Academy.
