= Krishna Palem =

American academic (born 1963)

Krishna.V.Palem
- Education: University of Texas at Austin; National Institute of Technology, Tiruchirappalli
- Awards: W. Wallace McDowell Award, Fellow AAAS, ACM, IEEE, Guggenheim Fellow, Moore Scholar at Caltech.
- Scientific career
- Fields: Algorithms, Applied Mathematics; Computer architecture, Circuits; Compilers, Devices; Embedded Computing; Physics; Quantum Computing
- Workplaces: Rice University, US; NYU, US; Georgia Institute of Technology, US; Nanyang Technological University, Singapore

Krishna V. Palem is a computer scientist known for pioneering work in probabilistic and inexact computing, fields that explore the trade-off between strict computational precision and gains in energy efficiency and scalability. His research has influenced approaches to energy-aware computing, embedded systems, and scalable architectures for artificial intelligence. He has held academic and visiting appointments at institutions including New York University Courant, Rice University, Georgia Tech, Caltech, and the Hebrew University. Prior to academia, his career started at IBM. In 2022, Palem founded Accelequant, a venture-backed company focused on technology platforms for hybrid classical/quantum computing systems, and is currently its CEO. The company aims to accelerate the time to delivery of Quantum Commercial advantage, through its platform initially supporting applications in Optimization and Machine Learning.

== Education ==
Krishna Palem obtained his Master of Science (Biomedical Engineering) and a PhD degree (Electrical and Computer Engineering) from the University of Texas at Austin.

== Career and Academia ==
Palem started his career in 1986 as a research staff member at the Thomas J. Watson Research Center at IBM where he worked on probabilistic algorithms and Optimizing Compilers till 1994. During this period, he also served as an advanced technology consultant at IBM's Santa Teresa Laboratory.

In 1994, Palem joined the Courant Institute of Mathematical Sciences at NYU as an associate professor, where he worked on compiler technologies and embedded computing systems. In 2000, he moved to the Georgia Institute of Technology, where he held professorships in Electrical and Computer Engineering and Computer Science, and served as Director of the Center for Research in Embedded Systems and Technology. In 1999, he co-founded Proceler Inc., an Atlanta-based venture-funded company focused on commercializing research in architecture assembly for productive application development on FPGA platforms.

In 2006–2007, Palem was a Moore Distinguished Faculty Fellow at the California Institute of Technology. During this period, he also held visiting and invited academic appointments, including serving as Canon Visiting Professor at Nanyang Technological University (NTU) in Singapore and as an invited professor at École Normale Supérieure (ENS) in Paris, France.

In 2006–2007, Palem joined Rice University as the inaugural Kenneth and Audrey Kennedy Professor of Computing, with joint appointments in Computer Science, Electrical and Computer Engineering and Statistics. During his tenure at Rice (2007–2022), he conducted research in what has become the field of inexact computing. He also served as Director of the Rice University Center for Computing at the Margins from 2015 to 2022.

In 2022, Palem founded Accelequant, Inc., a technology company focused on developing software platforms that improve the scalability and reliability of existing quantum computing systems for deploying commercially relevant applications by leveraging existing quantum computing hardware. The company builds on his prior research in probabilistic and inexact computing to address limitations in classical hardware systems by computing in the presence of noise and other uncertainties.

== Research ==
=== Probabilistic and inexact computing ===
Palem is known for his work on inexact computing, beginning in the early 2000s. The approach challenges traditional assumptions in digital system design by demonstrating that useful classes of applications can tolerate bounded computational imprecision in exchange for significant gains in energy and performance.

His group expanded his framework to embedded systems, ultra-low-energy architectures, and beyond.

In later work, including a 2023 paper on Algorithmic Foundations of Inexact Computing, Palem and collaborators developed formal models for analyzing the use of controlled inexactness in algorithm design.

Palem's and his group's work in this area has been cited in academic and industry discussions about the limits of Moore's Law and the increasing energy demands of large-scale computing systems. In a 2016 article in The New York Times, "Beyond Silicon: Squeezing More Out of Chips," this work on exact computing was discussed in the context of emerging alternatives of traditional silicon scaling, including approaches that treat mathematical precision as a controllable parameter in computing systems.

=== Energy-aware algorithm design ===
Work done with his graduate student advisees and collaborators include energy-aware algorithm design, exploring how algorithms and hardware architecture can be co-designed to reduce energy consumption without compromising functional outcomes. His research contributed to early discussions around the trade-offs between precision, reliability, and power efficiency in embedded and large-scale computing systems.

=== Embedded systems and architecture research ===
Earlier in his career, Palem contributed to compiler infrastructure, instruction set architectures, and hardware-software co-design for heterogeneous computing platforms. His research addressed architectural design space exploration, and reconfigurable systems.

=== Quantum computing and learning systems ===
Palem has co-authored research on quantum learning systems and computational approaches for large-scale Boolean function learning with his final PhD advisee and collaborator.

More generally, since 2015, Palem's research has focused on fundamental complexity questions in both classical and quantum computing.

=== Applications and impact ===
Palem's research has informed applied work in advanced computing systems, particularly in contexts where efficiency constraints shape system design. His work on inexact computing has been referenced in discussions of computational approaches for artificial intelligence and large-scale data processing, where trade-offs between accuracy and resource use are increasing relevant.

More recently, these ideas have been extended to emerging computing domains, including quantum systems, where limitations in hardware scale and reliability present challenges analogous to those encountered in classical architectures. His work has examined how principles from probabilistic and inexact computation can be applied to improve the effective use of emerging technologies, notably in the quantum computing domain.

== Entrepreneurial Work ==
The company Accelequant, which Palem has founded and is building, aims to accelerate the time to delivery of commercial advantage to enterprises enabled by quantum computing, through its software platform initially supporting application in Optimization and Machine Learning.

Its technical approach extends the reach of probabilistic and inexact computing through improved utilization of existing quantum computing hardware resources to unlock a path for enterprises to hyper-scale affordability.

== Significant Publications ==
=== Quantum Computing ===
1. Palem, K. V., Pham, D. H., & Rao, M. V. P. (2022). Quantum learning of concentrated Boolean functions. Quantum Information Processing, 21(7).

=== Inexact Computing ===
1. Augustine, J., Fried, D., Palem, K. V., Pham, D. H., & Shrivastava, A. (2023). Algorithmic Foundations of Inexact Computing. arXiv:2305.18705.
2. Palem, K. V., & Lingamneni, A. (2013). Ten years of building broken chips: The physics and engineering of inexact computing. ACM Transactions on Embedded Computing Systems, 12(2s).
3. Lingamneni, A., Enz, C., Palem, K. V., & Piguet, C. (2011). Energy parsimonious circuit design through probabilistic pruning. Proceedings of DATE.
4. Kedem, Z. M., Mooney, V. J., & Palem, K. V. (2011). An approach to energy-error tradeoffs in approximate ripple carry adders. Proceedings of ISLPED.
5. Chakrapani, L. N., Korkmaz, P., Akgul, B. E. S., & Palem, K. V. (2007). Probabilistic system-on-a-chip architectures. ACM Transactions on Design Automation of Electronic Systems, 12(3).
6. George, J., Marr, B., Akgul, B. E. S., & Palem, K. V. (2006). Probabilistic arithmetic and energy efficient embedded signal processing. Proceedings of CASES.
7. Korkmaz, P., Akgul, B. E. S., Palem, K. V., & Chakrapani, L. N. (2006). Advocating noise as an agent for ultra-low energy computing: Probabilistic CMOS devices. Japanese Journal of Applied Physics, 45(4S).
8. Palem, K.V. (2005). Energy aware computing through probabilistic switching: A study of limits. IEEE transactions on Computing.
9. Palem, K. V. (2003). Computational Proof as Experiment: Probabilistic Algorithms from a Thermodynamic Perspective. Lecture Notes in Computer Science (LNCS).
10. Palem, K. V. (2003). Energy aware algorithm design via probabilistic computing. Proceedings of CASES.

== Awards and recognitions ==
Palem has received professional honors and peer recognition for his contributions to computing, spanning research, engineering, and academic leadership. Awards include:

- Test of Time Award, ACM-IEEE Embedded Systems Week, 2024
- Guggenheim Fellowship, 2015
- Fellow, American Association for the Advancement of Science (AAAS), 2012
- Recognitions:
  - I-Slate, featured at the IEEE's 125th anniversary as one of the seven "Technologies That Will Change the Way Humans Interact with Machines, the World and Each Other", 2009.
  - PCMOS, recognized by Technology Review published by MIT as one of the "10 technologies that we think are most likely not to change the way we live", 2008.
- W. Wallace McDowell Award, IEEE Computer Society, 2008
- Moore Distinguished Faculty Fellow, California Institute of Technology, 2006–07
- Fellow, Association for Computing Machinery (ACM), 2006
- Distinguished Mentor Award, School of Electrical and Computer Engineering, Georgia Institute of Technology, 2005
- Fellow, Institute of Electrical and Electronics Engineers (IEEE), 2004.
- Schonbrunn Fellow, Hebrew University of Jerusalem, 2000
- Teaching Excellence, The Hebrew University of Jerusalem, 1999.
- External Recognition Award, IBM Research Division, 1994.
- Palem’s advisees have also been recognized, with honors including:
  - The Janet Fabri Prize (Surendranath Talla)
  - The Sigma Xi Best Dissertation Award (Lakshmi Chakrapani)
