= Kylie (name) =

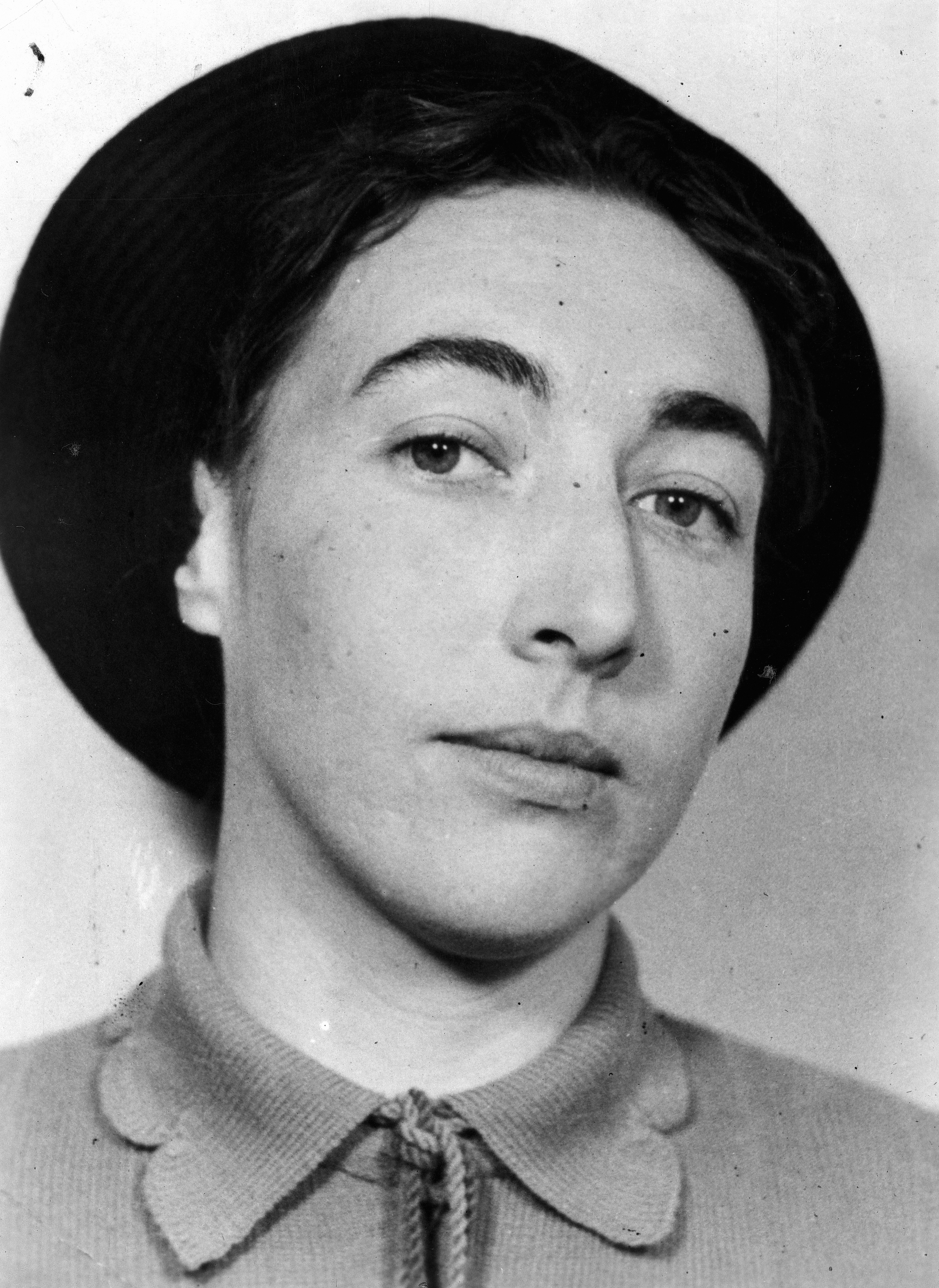
- Australian novelist Kylie Tennant (1912-1988) was an early bearer of the name.
- Pronunciation: /ˈkaɪliː/ KYE-lee
- Gender: Female
- Language: Noongar, Gaelic Irish

Origin
- Meaning: boomerang or graceful/beautiful or princess
- Region of origin: Australia, Ireland, Scotland

Other names
- Related names: Kyle, Kyla, Kylee, Kiley, Kayleigh, Kaylee, Kayla

Kylie is an English feminine given name with multiple origins. It might be a variant of the name Kyle. It might be derived from the Aboriginal Australian Noongar word kiley, meaning 'curved, returning stick, boomerang'. It also might be derived from the Irish surname O'Kiely, which in turn derives from the Old Gaelic surname O'Cadhla, meaning 'graceful or beautiful', 'descendant(s) of the graceful one'.

Public records show that the given name Kylie was in use in Australia at least as far back as 1877. A 1947 survey of newborn names reported that "Australian parents show a general reluctance to use aboriginal words in naming their children" and cited Kylie as one of the few exceptions.

The name became popular during the late 1960s to the early 1970s and was listed in 1970 in Australia as the fifth most popular girl's name. The Australian author Kylie Tennant (1912–1988) may have been the modern originator of this name. She was born Kathleen Tennant, but was called Kylie (her nickname) since her childhood. According to the Australian Dictionary of Biography, the publication of her third novel in 1941 "made her a household name and brought her international acclaim". "Kylie" first appeared on the list of 100 most popular female baby names in New South Wales in 1965, reaching a peak of popularity in 1972–1974 when it was the second most popular girl's name.

The name and its variants have been in use in the United States since the late 19th century. In the United States, the name was first recorded in the top 1000 female baby names in 1978, but did not reach the top 100 until 2001. It remains a well-used name for girls in the United States.

Many spelling variants of the name are also in use, including Khylie, Kilee, Kileigh, Kiley, Kylee, Kyley, Kyleigh, and Kyly, among others.

Usage of the name increased throughout the Anglosphere due to the popularity of Australian singer Kylie Minogue.

== People ==
=== Musicians and hosts ===
- Kylie Auldist, Australian singer
- Kylie Burtland, Canadian-born Australian composer
- Kylie Minogue (born 1968), Australian singer and actress
- Kylie Padilla (born 1993) Filipino-Australian actress and model
- Kylie Price (born 1993), New Zealander singer-songwriter
- Kylie Rae Harris (1989–2019), American country singer-songwriter
- Kylie Speer, Australian television host

=== Athletes (association football) ===
- Kylie Bivens (born 1978), American former soccer player
- Kylie Cockburn (born 1988), Scottish football match official
- Kylie Fitts (born 1994), American football linebacker
- Kylie Louw (born 1989), South African footballer
- Kylie McCarthy (born 1987), English-born Welsh footballer
- Kylie Nolan (born 1998), Welsh footballer
- Kylie Strom (born 1992), American soccer player

=== Athletes (other sports) ===
- Kylie Cronk (born 1984), Australian softball player
- Kylie Dickson (born 1999), American-born Belarusian artistic gymnast
- Kylie Dowling (born 1974), Australian Polocrosse rider
- Kylie Feuerbach (born 2001), American basketball player
- Kylie Foy (born 1971), New Zealander former field hockey striker
- Kylie Gauci (born 1985), Australian wheelchair basketball player
- Kylie Gill (born 1974), Australian-born competitive skier from New Zealand
- Kylie Grimes (born 1987), British para-athlete
- Kylie Halliday (born c. 1981), Australian sports aerobics athlete
- Kylie Hanigan (born 1971), Australian sprinter
- Kylie Henry (born 1986), Scottish golfer
- Kylie Hilder (born 1976), Australian former rugby league footballer
- Kylie Hutson (born 1987), American track and field athlete
- Kylie Jameson (born 1976), New Zealand sailor
- Kylie Jones, British ballroom dancer
- Kylie Ledbrook (born 1986), Australian soccer player
- Kylie Leuluai (born 1978), New Zealand former rugby player
- Kylie Lindsay (born 1983), squash player who represents New Zealand
- Kylie Masse (born 1996), Canadian swimmer
- Kylie Neira (born 2007), American pole vaulter
- Kylie Palmer (born 1990), Australian swimmer
- Kylie Peters (born c. 1975), Australian cricketer
- Kylie Rae (born 1992), American wrestler
- Kylie Reed (born 1974), Australian former bobsledder and track and field athlete
- Kylie Risk (born 1973), Australian long-distance runner
- Kylie Robilliard (born 1988), athlete from Guernsey
- Kylie Shadbolt (born 1972), Australian artistic gymnast
- Kylie Shea (born 1986), American ballet dancer
- Kylie Stone (born 1987), Canadian female artistic gymnast
- Kylie Waterreus (born 1998), Dutch cyclist
- Kylie Wheeler (born 1980), Australian retired heptathlete
- Kylie Whitehead (born 1995), Australian lawn bowler

=== Actresses ===
- Kylie Babbington (born 1987), British actress
- Kylie Belling, Australian actress
- Kylie Bunbury (born 1989), Canadian-American actress
- Kylie Cantrall (born 2005), American actress and singer
- Kylie Farmer, Aboriginal Australian actress
- Kylie Flinker, born 1974, Australian actress
- Kylie Padilla (born 1993), Filipino-Australian actress, model, and recording artist
- Kylie Rogers (born 2004), American child actress
- Kylie Travis (born 1970), Australian actress
- Kylie Tyndall (born 1992), American identical twin actresses
- Kylie Verzosa (born 1992), Filipino actress
- Kylie Watson (born 1978), Australian actress, interior designer, and model

=== Other ===
- Kylie Adams, American author
- Kylie Bax (born 1975), New Zealander fashion model
- Kylie Bisutti (born 1990), American author
- Kylie Brant, American author
- Kylie Chan, Australian author
- Kylie Cox, American Twitch streamer and YouTuber, TheSketchReal
- Kylie Gillies (born 1967), Australian television presenter
- Kylie Hercules (born 1989), Saint Helenian politician
- Kylie Ireland (born 1970), American actress best known for her work in pornographic films
- Kylie Jenner (born 1997), American reality TV personality, businesswoman, CEO and founder of Kylie Cosmetics
- Kylie Kelce (born 1992), American podcaster and media personality
- Kylie Kwong (born 1969), Australian television chef, author, television presenter and restaurateur
- Kylie Sonique Love (born 1983), American drag queen
- Kylie Maybury (1978–1984), Australian murder victim
- Kylie Moore-Gilbert, Australian-British academic and expert on Islamic studies
- Kylie Morris, Australian newsreader in the UK
- Kylie Oversen (born 1989), American politician
- Kylie Pentelow (born 1979), English journalist and TV news presenter
- Kylie Percival, Australian archivist
- Kylie Sturgess, Australian author and former President of the Atheist Foundation of Australia
- Kylie Tennant (1912–1988), Australian novelist, playwright, writer, critic, biographer, and historian
- Kylie Watson (British Army soldier), British Army medic
- Kylie Williams (born 1983), American beauty queen

== Fictional characters ==
- Kylie Galen, the protagonist of the novel series Shadow Falls
- Kylie Griffin, a character in the Ghostbusters franchise
- Kylie Mole, a Comedy Company schoolgirl character
- Kylie Platt, a character on the British television series Coronation Street
- Kylie the Carnival Fairy, a character in the Rainbow Magic book franchise

== See also ==
- Kyle (given name)
- Kylee, Keely, Kaylee, Kayleigh and Kayla
- Kylie (disambiguation)
- Life of Kylie, an American reality television series
