= Kaila =

- Gender: Female

Other names
- Related names: Kayla, Caila, Cayla, Cala, Kila, Cyla, Kyla

Kaila may refer to:

People with the surname Kaila:

- Mai al-Kaila (born 1955), Palestinian physician, diplomat and politician
- Eino Kaila (1890–1958), Finnish philosopher, critic and teacher
- Erkki Kaila (1867–1944), Finnish theologian, Archbishop of Turku
- Lauri Kaila, Finnish entomologist and researcher of biodiversity
- Osmo Kaila (1916–1991), Finnish chess master
- Toto Fogelberg-Kaila (1924–2013), Finnish cartoonist

People with the given name Kaila:

- Kaila Charles (born 1998), American basketball player
- Kaila Estrada (born 1996), Filipina actress
- Kaila Holtz (born 1981), Canadian softball pitcher
- Kaïla Issoufi (born 2001), French judoka
- Kaila Kuhn (born 2003), American freestyle skier
- Kaila McKnight (born 1986), Australian athlete
- Kaila Methven (born 1994), American fashion designer
- Kaila Mullady (born 1993), American musician
- Kaila Murnain, Australian politician
- Kaila Story (born 1980), African-American podcaster
- Kaila Yu (born 1979), Taiwanese-American singer-songwriter

== See also ==
- Kaila (开啦) – Chinese e-zine edited by actress and director Xu Jinglei
- Kaila (genus) – an insect genus in the tribe Empoascini
- Cala (disambiguation)
- Kala (disambiguation)
- Kayla (disambiguation)
- Kila (disambiguation)
- Kíla – Irish musical group
- Kyla (given name)
