= Keeley =

Keeley may refer to:

== People ==
=== Surname ===
- Barbara Keeley, British Labour MP
- Damian Keeley (born 1963), English professional football player
- Earl Keeley (born 1936), Canadian football player
- Edmund Keeley (1928–2022), American author, translator, and Professor Emeritus of English
- Edna Keeley (1884–1961) American stage actress
- Fred Keeley (born 1950), American politician from California; state representative
- James Keeley (1867–1934), American newspaper editor and publisher
- Joseph C. Keeley (1907–1994), American American Legion magazine editor
- Keon Keeley (born 2005), American football player
- Leslie Keeley (1836–1900), American physician, originator of the Keeley Cure
- Mary Anne Keeley (1805–1899), English actress
- Robert Keeley (1793–1869), English actor and comedian
- Sam Keeley (born 1990), Irish Actor
- Samuel Keeley (footballer), Scottish footballer
- Tom Keeley (born 1979), American guitarist
- Robert Keeley, founder of Keeley Electronics

=== Given name ===
- Keeley Hawes (born 1976), English actress
- Keeley Hazell (born 1986), English glamour model

== Other uses ==
- Kelly pool, game also called "Keeley"

== See also ==
- Keely (disambiguation)
