= Kyla (given name) =

- Pronunciation: KY-lah
- Gender: Female

Origin
- Origin: Gaelic
- Meaning: beauty, crowned

Other names
- Related names: Kelila; Kylie; Kyli; Kylah; Cala; Kala; Kaila; Kaela; Kayla; Cayla; Cadhla

Kyla is a female given name. It is a derivative of the originally Irish and Scottish Gaelic Kyle.

Kyla may refer to:

== Music ==
- Kyla (Filipino singer), Filipino R&B singer Melanie C. Alvarez's stage name
- Kyla (British singer) (Kyla Reid), British singer
- Kyla Brox, British singer
- Kyla Greenbaum, British pianist
- Kyla La Grange, British musician
- Kyla-Rose Smith, South African musician

== Sports ==
- Kyla Atienza, Filipina volleyball player
- Kyla Bremner, an Olympic athlete
- Kyla Inquig, Filipina footballer
- Kyla Josifovic (born 2003), Canadian ice hockey player
- Kyla Leibel (born 2001), Canadian swimmer
- Kyla Richey, Canadian volleyball player
- Kyla Ross, an American gymnast

== Other ==
- Kyla Cole (born 1978), Slovak glamour model
- Kyla Garcia, American actress
- Kyla Kenedy (born 2003), American actress
- Kyla Pratt (born 1986), American actress
- Kyla Tyson, a fictional character on the television series Holby City
- Kyla Ward, Australian author

== See also ==
- Cala (disambiguation)
- Kaila (disambiguation)
- Kala (disambiguation)
- Kayla (disambiguation)
- Kila (disambiguation)
