= List of Australian sportswomen =

List of notable Australian sportswomen. List is based on their inclusion into the Sport Australia Hall of Fame, Olympic and Paralympic individual gold medalist, multiple individual medalist at Olympic Games and world championships or recognized through public opinion lists. The list is not exhaustive.

== Athletics ==
- Judy Amoore – Olympic Games individual medalist and Sport Australia Hall of Fame inductee
- Raelene Boyle – multiple Olympic medalist and Sport Australia Hall of Fame inductee
- Maureen Caird – Olympic Games gold medalist and Sport Australia Hall of Fame inductee
- Betty Cuthbert – multiple Olympic gold medalist and Sport Australia Hall of Fame inductee
- Shirley de la Hunty – multiple Olympic gold medalist and Sport Australia Hall of Fame inductee
- Jane Flemming – multiple Commonwealth Games gold medalist
- Debbie Flintoff-King – Olympic gold medalist and Sport Australia Hall of Fame inductee
- Cathy Freeman – Olympic gold medalist and Sport Australia Hall of Fame inductee
- Tracey Freeman – multiple Paralympic Games gold medalist
- Marjorie Jackson – multiple Olympic gold medalist and Sport Australia Hall of Fame inductee
- Pam Kilborn – multiple Olympic Games individual medalist and Sport Australia Hall of Fame inductee
- Lisa Llorens – multiple Paralympic Games gold medalist
- Marlene Mathews – multiple Olympic medalist and Sport Australia Hall of Fame inductee
- Lisa McIntosh – multiple Paralympic Games gold medalist
- Decima Norman – multiple Commonwealth Games gold medalist and Sport Australia Hall of Fame inductee
- Glynis Nunn – Olympic gold medalist and Sport Australia Hall of Fame inductee
- Lisa Ondieki – Olympic Games individual medalist and Sport Australia Hall of Fame inductee
- Sally Pearson – Olympic games gold medalist
- Alison Quinn – multiple Paralympic Games gold medalist
- Louise Sauvage – multiple Paralaympic Games gold medalist and Sport Australia Hall of Fame inductee
- Donna Smith – multiple Paralympic Games gold medalist
- Katrina Webb – multiple Paralympic Games gold medalist
- Jodi Willis – multiple Paralympic Games gold medalist
- Amy Winters – multiple Paralympic Games gold medalist

== Basketball ==
- Suzy Batkovic – multiple Olympic Games medalist
- Sandy Brondello – multiple Olympic Games medalist
- Donna Burns – gold medalist at 1992 Paralympic Games for Persons with Mental Handicap
- Trisha Fallon – multiple Olympic Games medalist
- Kristi Harrower – multiple Olympic Games medalist
- Lauren Jackson – multiple Olympic Games medalist and three-time WNBA MVP; 2021 inductee of the Naismith Memorial Basketball Hall of Fame
- Erin Phillips – Olympic Games medalist and multiple FIBA World Cup medalist; also two-time MVP of AFL Women's in Australian rules football
- Rachael Sporn – multiple Olympic Games medalist
- Penny Taylor – multiple Olympic Games medalist
- Liesl Tesch – multiple Paralympic medalist and gold medalist in sailing.
- Michele Timms – multiple Olympic Games medalist and Sport Australia Hall of Fame inductee

== Canoeing ==
- Katrin Borchert – multiple Olympic medalist
- Jessica Fox – Olympic Games and world championship gold medalist
- Anna Wood – multiple Olympic medalist
- Danielle Woodward – Olympic Games medalist

== Cricket ==
- Belinda Clark – former captain and Sport Australia Hall of Fame inductee
- Ellyse Perry – dual international cricket and football
- Karen Rolton – former leading batsman
- Lisa Sthalekar – former leading all rounder
- Betty Wilson – former leading batsman and Sport Australia Hall of Fame inductee

== Cycling ==
- Sara Carrigan – Olympic Games gold medalist
- Michelle Ferris – multiple Olympic Games medalist
- Anna Meares – multiple Olympic Games gold medalist
- Kathy Watt – Olympic gold medalist and Sport Australia Hall of Fame inductee

== Diving ==
- Brittany Broben – Olympic Games individual medallist
- Jenny Donnet – multiple Commonwealth Games gold medalist
- Chantelle Newbery – Olympic Games gold medalist
- Loudy Wiggins – multiple Olympic Games medalist
- Melissa Wu – multiple Olympic Games medalist

== Equestrian ==
- Julie Higgins – multiple Paralympic Games gold medalist
- Gillian Rolton – Olympic Games gold medalist and Sport Australia Hall of Fame inductee
- Wendy Schaeffer – Olympic Games gold medalist and Sport Australia Hall of Fame inductee

== Golf ==
- Edwina Kennedy – Sport Australia Hall of Fame inductee
- Jan Stephenson – Sport Australia Hall of Fame and World Golf Hall of Fame inductee
- Karrie Webb – winner of multiple women's major championships and World Golf Hall of Fame inductee
- Leonara Wray – Sport Australia Hall of Fame inductee

== Gymnastics ==
- Alexandra Kiroi-Bogatyreva (born 2002) - Olympic rhythmic gymnast
- Lauren Mitchell – World champion gold medalist
- Monette Russo – World champion medalist

== Hockey ==
- Alyson Annan – multiple Olympic Games gold medalist and Sport Australia Hall of Fame inductee
- Sharon Buchanan – Olympic Games gold medalist and Sport Australia Hall of Fame inductee
- Diane Gorman – former captain and Sport Australia Hall of Fame inductee
- Rechelle Hawkes – multiple Olympic gold medalist and Sport Australia Hall of Fame inductee
- Jacqueline Pereira – multiple Olympic gold medalist and Sport Australia Hall of Fame inductee
- Nova Peris – Olympic Games gold medalist and Commonwealth Games gold medalist in athletics
- Liane Tooth – multiple Olympic Games gold medalist and Sport Australia Hall of Fame inductee

== Horse racing ==
- Gai Waterhouse – leading Australian trainer

== Motor sport ==
- Leanne Tander – leading Australian driver

== Lacrosse ==
- Jen Adams – world champion, NCAA Lacrosse legend
- Hannah Nielsen – world champion
- Wendy Piltz – world champion
- Jenny Williams – world champion

== Netball ==
- Margaret Caldow – Sport Australia Hall of Fame inductee
- Jane Cowan – Sport Australia Hall of Fame inductee
- Michelle den Dekker – leading defender, World and Commonwealth Games champion, longest reigning Captain, elite coach
- Liz Ellis – leading defender and Sport Australia Hall of Fame inductee
- Sharelle McMahon – leading Australian shooter
- Anne Sargeant – leading goal shooter and Sport Australia Hall of Fame inductee
- Vicki Wilson – leading goal shooter and Sport Australia Hall of Fame inductee

== Polocrosse ==
- Kylie Dowling – Western Australian, polocrosse rider

== Rock Climbing ==
- Oceana Mackenzie - Olympian sport climber
- Angie Scarth-Johnson - sport climber, youngest person to climber grade 5.14b

== Rowing ==
- Kim Crow – Olympic Games multiple medalist
- Adair Ferguson – Sport Australia Hall of Fame inductee
- Megan Marcks – Olympic Games gold medalist and Sport Australia Hall of Fame inductee
- Kate Slatter – Olympic Games gold medalist and Sport Australia Hall of Fame inductee

== Sailing ==
- Jenny Armstrong – Olympic Games gold medalist
- Kay Cottee – Sport Australia Hall of Fame inductee
- Tessa Parkinson – Olympic Games gold medalist
- Elise Rechichi – Olympic Games gold medalist
- Belinda Stowell – Olympic Games gold medalist
- Liesl Tesch – Paralympic Games gold medalist

== Shooting ==
- Suzanne Balogh – Olympic Games gold medalist
- Libby Kosmala – Multiple Paralympic Games gold medalist
- Judith Trim – Sport Australia Hall of Fame inductee

== Skateboarding ==
- Arisa Trew – Olympic medalist

== Skiing ==
- Torah Bright – Olympic Games gold medalist
- Alisa Camplin – Olympic Games gold medalist and Sport Australia Hall of Fame inductee
- Jacqui Cooper – world champion
- Lydia Lassila – Olympic Games gold medalist
- Kirstie Marshall – world champion and Sport Australia Hall of Fame inductee
- Anna Segal – Olympic freestyle skier and two-time world champion
- Zali Steggall – Olympic Games medalist and Sport Australia Hall of Fame inductee

== Soccer ==
- Melissa Barbieri – former Australian captain
- Ashley Brown – player for Melbourne Victory
- Sam Kerr – current Australia captain; all-time leading goal scorer for the W-League and the US National Women's Soccer League; two-time NWSL MVP
- Melissa Maizels (born 1993) – footballer
- Julie Murray – early professional pioneer
- Ellyse Perry – dual international cricket and football
- Cheryl Salisbury – former Australian captain
- Kyah Simon – first Aboriginal Australian footballer to score a goal at a World Cup final
- Sarah Walsh

== Softball ==
- Joyce Lester – Sport Australia Hall of Fame inductee
- Marjorie Nelson – Sport Australia Hall of Fame inductee

== Squash ==
- Vicki Cardwell – multiple British Open and Sport Australia Hall of Fame inductee
- Sarah Fitz-Gerald – multiple world champion and Sport Australia Hall of Fame inductee
- Michelle Martin – multiple world champion and Sport Australia Hall of Fame inductee
- Heather McKay – multiple British Open and Sport Australia Hall of Fame inductee

== Surf life saving ==
- Reen Corbett – former Australian champion
- Karla Gilbert – former Australian champion

== Surfing ==
- Layne Beachley – multiple world champion and Sport Australia Hall of Fame inductee
- Wendy Botha – multiple world champion
- Pam Burridge – world champion and Sport Australia Hall of Fame inductee
- Stephanie Gilmore – multiple world champion

== Swimming ==
- Cate Campbell – multiple individual medalist at Olympic Games and world championships
- Melissa Carlton – multiple Paralympic Games gold medalist
- Ellie Cole – multiple Paralympic Games gold medalist
- Priya Cooper – multiple Paralympic Games gold medalist
- Alicia Coutts – multiple Commonwealth Games gold medalist
- Lorraine Crapp – Olympic Games gold medalist and Sport Australia Hall of Fame inductee
- Anne Currie – multiple Paralympic Games gold medalist
- Lisa Curry-Kenny
- Gemma Dashwood – multiple Paralympic Games gold medalist
- Clare Dennis – Olympic Games gold medalist and Sport Australia Hall of Fame inductee
- Fanny Durack – Olympic Games gold medalist and Sport Australia Hall of Fame inductee
- Elizabeth Edmondson – multiple Paralympic Games gold medalist
- Michelle Ford – Olympic Games gold medalist and Sport Australia Hall of Fame inductee
- Dawn Fraser – multiple Olympic Games gold medalist and Sport Australia Hall of Fame inductee
- Tracey Freeman – multiple Paralympic Games gold medalist
- Jacqueline Freney – multiple Paralympic Games gold medalist
- Shane Gould – multiple Olympic Games gold medalist and Sport Australia Hall of Fame inductee
- Jodie Henry – multiple Olympic Games gold medalist
- Daphne Hilton – multiple Paralympic Games gold medalist
- Liesel Jones – multiple Olympic Games gold medalist
- Annette Kellerman – Sport Australia Hall of Fame inductee
- Ilsa Konrads – Commonwealth Games gold medalist and Sport Australia Hall of Fame inductee
- Hayley Lewis – multiple Olympic Games medalist and Sport Australia Hall of Fame inductee
- Libby Lenton – multiple Olympic Games gold medalist
- Lyn McClements – Olympic Games gold medalist and Sport Australia Hall of Fame inductee
- Emma McKeon – multiple Olympic Games gold medalist
- Kaylee McKeown – multiple Olympic Games gold medalist
- Bonnie Mealing – Olympic Games medalist and Sport Australia Hall of Fame inductee
- Karen Moras – multiple Commonwealth Games gold medalist and Sport Australia Hall of Fame inductee
- Gail Neall – Olympic Games gold medalist and Sport Australia Hall of Fame inductee
- Susan O'Neill – multiple Olympic Games gold medalist and Sport Australia Hall of Fame inductee
- Siobhan Paton – multiple Paralympic Games gold medalist
- Stephanie Rice – multiple Olympic Games gold medalist
- Jessica Schipper – multiple world champion
- Emily Seebohm – multiple individual medalist at Olympic Games and world championships
- Petria Thomas – multiple Olympic Games gold medalist and Sport Australia Hall of Fame inductee
- Ariarne Titmus – multiple Olympic Games gold medallist
- Beverley Whitfield – Olympic Games gold medalist and Sport Australia Hall of Fame inductee
- Tracey Wickham – multiple world champion and Sport Australia Hall of Fame inductee
- Mina Wylie – Olympic Games medalist and Sport Australia Hall of Fame inductee

== Taekwondo ==
- Lauren Burns – Olympic Games gold medalist

== Tennis ==
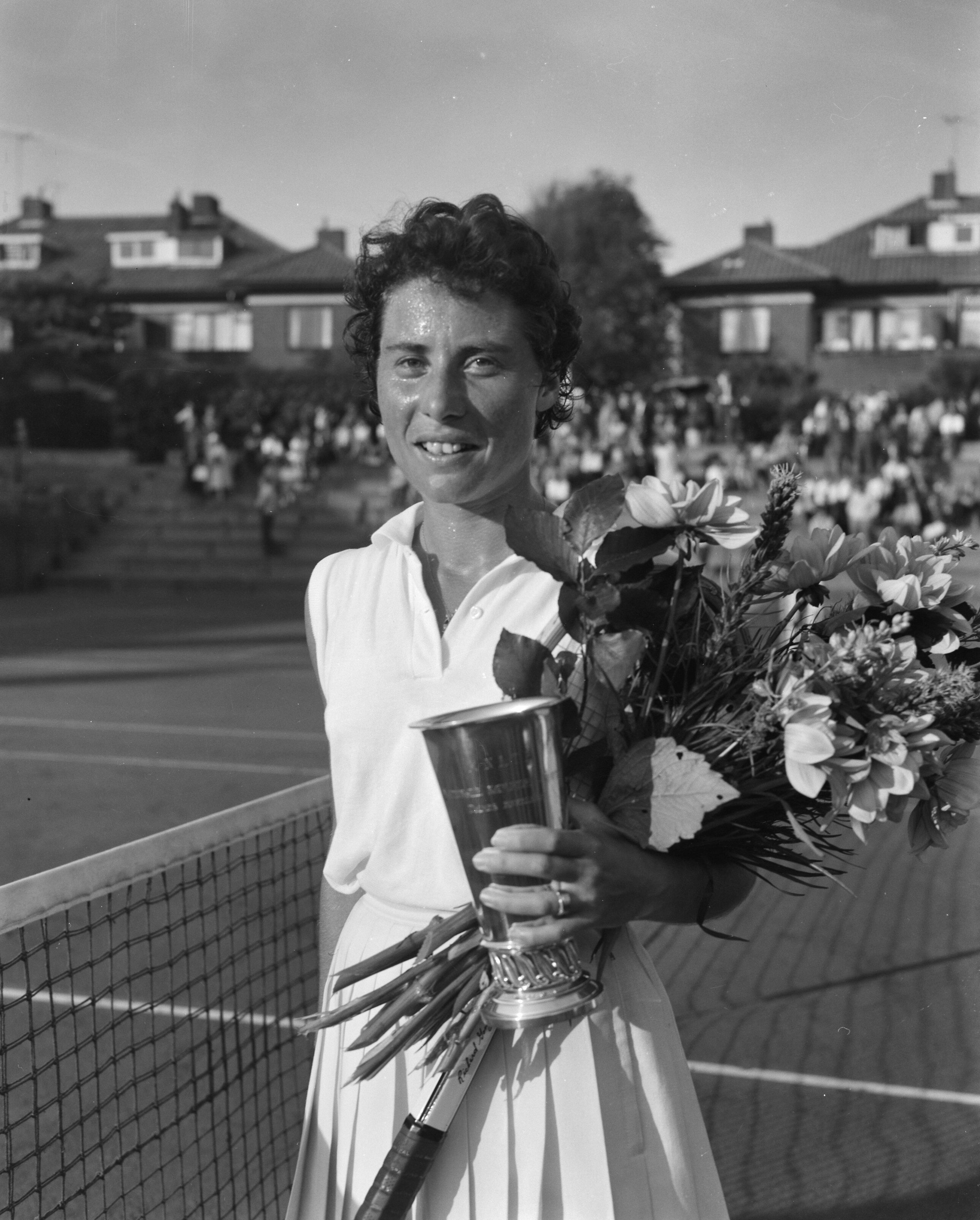
Eva Duldig

- Ashleigh Barty – multiple grand slam champion and two-time year-end world #1 player
- Lesley Bowrey – multiple grand slam champion and Sport Australia Hall of Fame inductee
- Margaret Court – multiple grand slam champion and Sport Australia Hall of Fame inductee
- Eva Duldig (born 1938) – Austrian-born Australian and Dutch tennis player, author
- Evonne Goolagong – multiple grand slam champion and Sport Australia Hall of Fame inductee
- Sam Stosur – grand slam champion

== Triathlon ==
- Emma Carney – world champion
- Jackie Gallagher – world champion
- Nicole Hackett – world champion
- Loretta Harrop – Olympic Games medalist and world champion
- Michellie Jones – Olympic medalist and world champion
- Joanne King – world champion
- Emma Moffatt – Olympic medalist and world champion
- Emma Snowsill – Olympic gold medalist and world champion

== Volleyball ==
- Natalie Cook – Olympic gold medalist beach volleyball
- Kerri Pottharst – Olympic gold medalist beach volleyball

== Water polo ==
- Sienna Green (born 2004) – water polo Olympian
- Debbie Watson – Olympic gold medalist and Sport Australia Hall of Fame inductee
