= Australian Women's Register =

Online database of Australian women

The Australian Women's Register (AWR) is a searchable online database which aims to cover Australian women and Australian women's organisations. It is maintained by the National Foundation for Australian Women (NFAW) and the University of Melbourne.

== History and description ==
Part of the Australian Women's Archives Project, the Australian Women's Register was established in 2000 and is maintained by the National Foundation for Australian Women (NFAW), together with the University of Melbourne.

The Australian Women's Register is a searchable online database that combines many resources and allows users to find historical and contemporary material on notable Australian women in all fields, as well as women's organisations. It aims to help users find:

- women
- organisations
- archives
- publications
- and other digital resources.

== National Foundation for Australian Women ==
The National Foundation for Australian Women (NFAW) was set up by a group of women's rights campaigners who wished to establish a body to promote women's movement ideas and policies. It was established in 1989 with seed money of $100,000 from Pamela Denoon and a trust fund in her name. It was to be independent of political parties and was to form partnerships with other women's organisations. Its purpose was to ensure that women's history, knowledge, and wisdom would be accessible to new generations of women, and to advance and protect Australian women's interest in all spheres of life.

== See also ==
- Convict women in Australia
- List of Australian women artists
- List of Australian women writers
- List of Australian sportswomen
- Women and government in Australia
- Women in the Australian military
