= Samuel Keeley =

Samuel Keeley may refer to:

- Sam Keeley (born 1991), Irish actor
- Samuel Keeley (footballer) (1874–?), Scottish footballer
