= Keely =

- Pronunciation: [KEE-lee]
- Gender: Primarily female

Origin
- Origin: Irish origin
- Region of origin: Ireland

Other names
- Variant forms: Keeley, Keelie
- Related names: Kaelyn, Keira, Kiley, Kaylee

Keely is a given name and surname.

== Surname ==
- Alan Keely (1982–2021), Irish football defender
- Bob Keely (1909–2001), American baseball coach, scout, and player
- Conrad Keely, American rock music singer
- Dermot Keely, Irish professional football player and manager
- John Ernst Worrell Keely (1827–1898), American inventor; invented the Keely Motor
- Pat Keely, British graphic artist
- Patrick Keely (fl. early 20th century), American church architect
- Peter Keely, Irish footballer
- Reggie Keely (born 1991), American basketball player
- Séamus Keely (1889–1974), Irish politician

== Given name ==
- Keely Andrew, Australian surfer
- Keely Brown (born 1993), Canadian curler
- Keely Brown (goaltender) (born 1976), Canadian ringette, roll-in-line hockey, and ice hockey player
- Keely Cashman (born 1999), American alpine skier
- Keely Cat-Wells, British disability rights activist
- Keely Froling (born 1996), Australian basketball forward
- Keely Hodgkinson (born 2002), English middle-distance runner
- Keely Kelleher, American alpine skier
- Keely Medeiros (born 1987), Brazilian shot putter
- Keely Moy (born 1998), Swiss and American ice hockey player
- Keely Shaw (born 1994), Canadian cyclist
- Keely Small (born 2001), Australian middle-distance runner
- Keely Smith (1928–2017), American jazz singer
- Keely Shaye Smith, American journalist, author and television host

== See also ==
- Keeley (disambiguation)
