= Kila =

Kila or KILA can refer to:

== Arts and entertainment ==
- Kíla, an Irish folk band
- "Kila", a 2019 song from Stolen Diamonds by the Cat Empire
- Kila Kila Kila, album by Japanese rock band OOIOO
- Kila Marr, a xenologist in the fictional Star Trek universe

== People ==
- 100 Kila, stage name of Bulgarian rapper Yavor Dimitrov Yanakiev (born 1985)
- Kíla Lord Cassidy (fl. 2020–present), British-Irish child actress
- Kila Haoda (born 1949), Papua New Guinean politician and former governor of Central Province
- Kila Iaravai (born 1991), Papua New Guinean football
- Kila Kaʻaihue (born 1984), American former Major League Baseball and Nippon Professional Baseball player
- Kila Pala (born 1986), Papua New Guinean cricket coach and former player
- Adefemi Kila (born 1945), Nigerian politician and engineer
- Darius Kila, American politician elected to the Hawaii House of Representatives in 2022
- Jason Kila (born 1990), Papua New Guinean cricketer
- Yuguda Hassan Kila (1951–2021), Nigerian politician

== Places ==
- Galeh, Lorestan, Iran, also spelled Kīla, a village
- Kila, Sweden, a settlement in Sala Municipality, Sweden
- Kila, Montana, United States, a census-designated place and unincorporated community
- Kila Airfield, a World War II airfield near Port Moresby, Papua New Guinea

== Other uses ==
- Kīla (Buddhism), an iconic ritual dagger and deity
- KILA, original callsign of KSOS, a radio station serving Las Vegas
- KILA-LD, a low-power television station licensed to serve Cherry Valley, California, United States
- Kerala Institute of Local Administration (KILA) an autonomous government training and research institute in Kerala

== See also ==
- Kaila
- Kala (disambiguation)
- Kayla (disambiguation)
- Koila, Kozani, a village in northern Greece
- Kyla (given name)
