= Caitlin Foord =

Australian soccer player (born 1994)

- Foord with Arsenal in 2026

Personal information
- Full name: Caitlin Jade Foord
- Date of birth: 11 November 1994 (age 32)
- Place of birth: Shellharbour, New South Wales, Australia
- Height: 1.69 m (5 ft 7 in)
- Positions: Winger; right wing back; forward

Team information
- Current team: Arsenal
- Number: 9

Youth career
- Warilla Wanderers
- –2008: Illawarra Sports H.S.
- 2008–2009: NSWIS

Senior career*
Years	Team	Apps	(Gls)
2009–2010	Central Coast Mariners	0	(0)
2010–2013	Sydney FC	35	(6)
2013–2014	Sky Blue FC	36	(0)
2013–2014	→ Sydney FC (loan)	11	(5)
2014–2016	Perth Glory	20	(6)
2015	Sky Blue FC	10	(0)
2016–2017	Sydney FC	10	(2)
2017	Vegalta Sendai Ladies	17	(4)
2017–2020	Sydney FC	30	(15)
2018–2019	Portland Thorns FC	26	(3)
2020–	Arsenal	129	(32)

International career^{‡}
2007–2011	Australia U-17	5	(1)
2011–	Australia	152	(42)
- * Club domestic league appearances and goals as of 22 November 2026 ‡ National team caps and goals as of 13 October 2026

Caitlin Jade Foord (born 11 November 1994) is an Australian professional soccer player who plays as a forward for Women's Super League club Arsenal and the Australia national team. She became the youngest Australian to play at a World Cup in 2011 at the age of 16.

In 2011, Foord was named World Cup Best Women's Young Player, Asian Women's Young Footballer of the Year, and Football Federation Australia's U20 Women's Footballer of the Year. In 2016, she was awarded Asian Women's Footballer of the Year by the Asian Football Confederation.

== Early life ==
Raised with her sister Jamie by their mother Simone in Shellharbour, a suburb 100 kilometres south of Sydney in the Illawarra region of New South Wales, Foord attended Illawarra Sports High School. Her mother would frequently drive Foord three-four hours round-trip to Sydney for training and games: "She'd pick me up straight after school and drive me to Sydney Olympic Park and back four times a week for training – and again on the weekend for a game." Her sister Jamie recommended to their mother to let Caitlin try football after seeing her play on the playground at school with boys. "She was just doing so many sports. We took her down and signed her up for the Warilla Wanderers ... I think in the first game she scored six goals." Foord is the only member of her family to play football.

Foord played for local teams Illawarra Stingrays and the Sutherland Sharks before spending some time at the New South Wales Institute of Sport. In 2009, she was named Junior Sports Star of the Year at the Shellharbour Sports Awards. She also played futsal for the NSW Under 13 team who competed in the Australian Championships in Canberra. At age 13, she earned her first cap for Australia's under-17 national team.

== Club career ==
=== Central Coast Mariners (2009) ===
At the age of 14, Foord signed with Central Coast Mariners ahead of the 2009 W-League season, but did not play in a match for the club.

=== Sydney FC (2010–14) ===
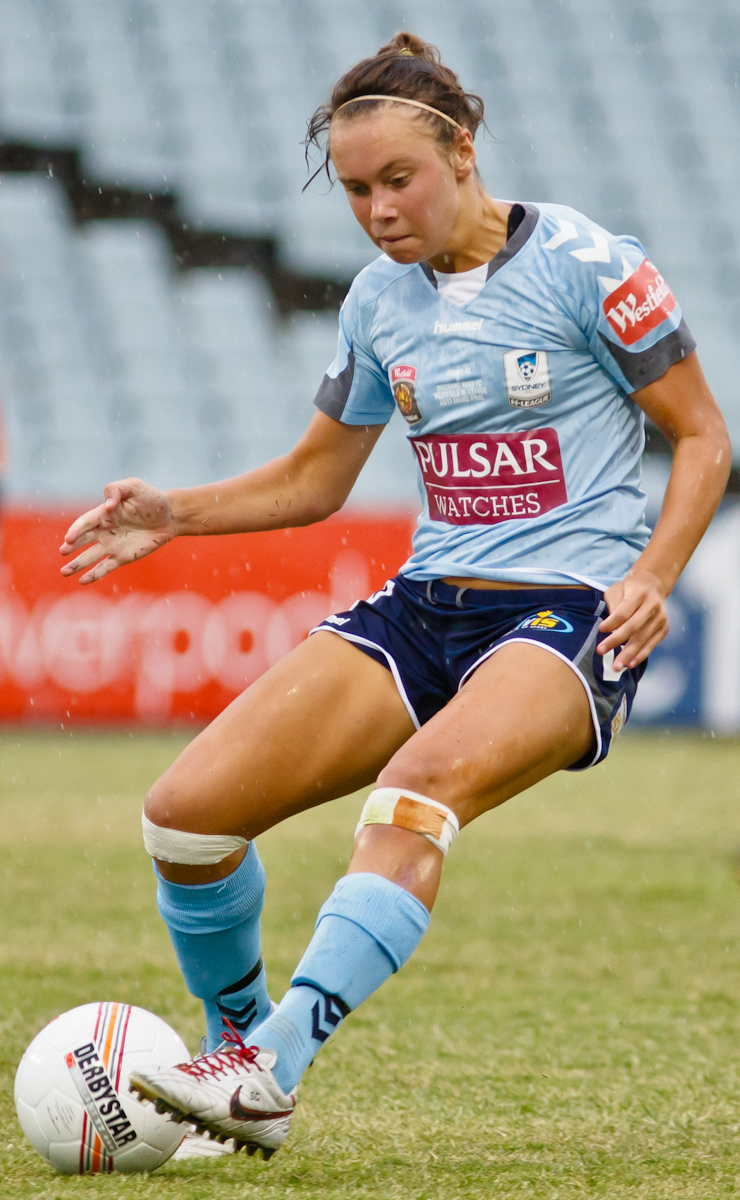
Foord playing for Sydney FC in the 2010-11 W-League grand final

With the announcement that the Central Coast Mariners would not field a women's team in the 2010–11 W-League season, Foord, along with fellow Mariners players Teresa Polias, Lydia Vandenbergh, and Renee Rollason, switched to nearby club, Sydney FC. Foord spent four straight seasons with Sydney FC, where she appeared in 44 games and scored 10 goals.

Foord scored her first goal for Sydney FC during a 4–1 win against Adelaide United on 20 November 2010. It was her only goal during the 2010–11 season. She was a starting player in 10 of the 11 games she played. Sydney finished first in the league with a 8–2–0 record.

During the 2011–12 W-League season, Foord started in five of the eleven matches she played and scored two goals. On 12 November, she scored a goal in a 4–1 win against Newcastle Jets, pouncing on an errant back pass from the Jets defence and coolly slotting the ball into goal. Sydney FC finished third during the regular season with a 5–3–2 record.

Returning to Sydney for the 2012–13 W-League season, Foord scored three goals in eleven matches. During a match against Melbourne Victory on 8 December, she scored the game-opening goal in the fifth minute. Sydney finished in fourth place during the regular season with a 6–4–2 record. After defeating Brisbane Roar 3–2 in the semi-finals, Foord helped Sydney FC clinch the championship title with a 3–1 grand final win against Melbourne Victory.

During the 2013–14 W-League season, Foord scored four goals in eleven matches for Sydney FC. After sitting out many of the early season matches due to a foot injury, she scored a hat trick against Perth Glory in an 8–2 win on 5 January. Sydney FC finished in second place during the regular season with a 8–2–2 record. The team was eliminated in the semi-finals in a 2–1 defeat against Canberra United.

=== Sky Blue FC (2013–15) ===
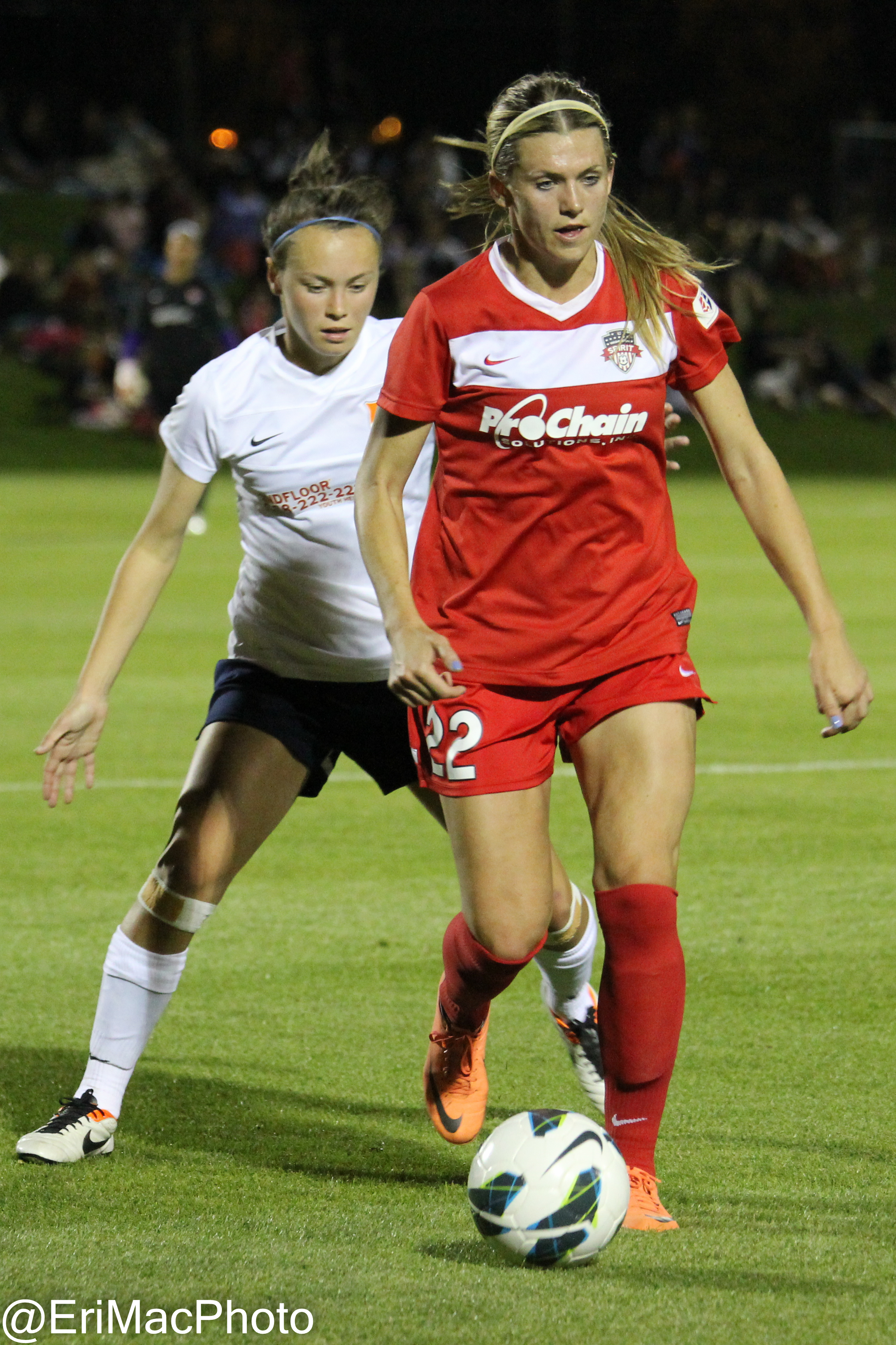
Foord defends against Washington Spirit player Stephanie Ochs, June 2013.

In March 2013, it was announced that Foord had signed with American team, Sky Blue FC, for the inaugural season of the National Women's Soccer League (NWSL). In 2013, she appeared in 15 games, helping Sky Blue to their only playoff appearance in club history. She was named to the 2013 NWSL Second XI Team.

Foord returned to Sky Blue for the 2014 NWSL Season and was in the starting lineup for 20 of her 21 appearances. Sky Blue finished the season in sixth place.

In February 2015, Foord agreed to return to Sky Blue alongside fellow Matildas teammate Sam Kerr. Due to the 2015 FIFA Women's World Cup, they did not join Sky Blue until July. Foord appeared in the final 10 games of the 2015 NWSL season. The team finished in eighth place with a 5–8–7 record.

After being listed on Sky Blue's preseason roster for the 2016 NWSL Season, Foord did not participate in preseason training and did not play for Sky Blue during the 2016 season. In December 2016, it was reported that Foord would not play in the NWSL in 2017 as she was signing with a team in Japan. Reports later emerged about poor long-term conditions for players in terms of housing, travel, and training facilities.

=== Perth Glory (2014–16) ===
In August 2014, Foord signed a one-year deal to join Perth Glory for the 2014 W-League season. In 12 appearances for Perth, Foord scored 5 goals.

Foord re-signed with Perth of the 2015–16 W-League season. On 2 January 2016, Foord suffered a broken collar bone that required surgery. This injury ruled her out for the remainder of the season.

=== Return to Sydney FC (2016–17) ===
On 13 September 2016, Sydney FC announced that Foord had re-signed, returning to the club where she had previously played for four seasons. In 10 matches for Sydney during the 2016-17 W-League season, she played 766 minutes and scored 2 goals.

=== Vegalta Sendai Ladies (2017) ===
In January 2017, Japan Women's Football League club Vegalta Sendai Ladies announced that the club had signed Foord on a one-year deal. Foord scored four goals in 17 games for the club and reported having a challenging time adapting to the unrelenting Japanese training schedule.

=== Second return to Sydney FC (2017–20) ===
On 15 December 2017, after her season had concluded in Japan, Foord returned to Sydney FC and re-signed for the 2017-18 W-League season. Foord scored 3 goals in 6 games and helped Sydney FC qualify for the playoffs. In the semi-final match against the Newcastle Jets, Foord suffered a ruptured Lisfranc ligament which required surgery. The injury forced her to miss the 2018 grand final against Melbourne City. Melbourne won the game 2–0.

In the 2018–19 W-League season, Foord scored her second career W-League hat-trick on 9 December 2018 against the Brisbane Roar. Her three goals helped Sydney to a 5–1 victory, ending a three-game losing streak.

Foord briefly returned to Sydney for the 2019–20 W-League season, scoring 2 goals in 9 appearances before leaving early to pursue an opportunity with Arsenal in January 2020.

=== Portland Thorns (2018–19) ===
On 11 January 2018, Foord's rights in the NWSL were traded from Sky Blue to Seattle Reign FC for Katie Johnson and Rebekah Stott. Her rights were subsequently traded to the Portland Thorns FC along with a 2020 NWSL 2nd Round draft pick in exchange for US international midfielder Allie Long. However, Foord was still playing in the W-League at the time and suffered a serious foot injury in the semi-final that required surgery. As a result, she didn't make her debut for the Thorns until 6 August 2018. On 14 April 2019, Foord scored her first goal for Portland, in a 2–0 win over Orlando Pride.

On 8 January 2020, Foord's NWSL rights were traded to Orlando Pride along with Emily Sonnett and two draft picks in exchange for Orlando's No. 1 overall selection in the 2020 NWSL College Draft.

=== Arsenal (2020–present) ===
On 24 January 2020, Foord left Sydney FC to sign for FA WSL club Arsenal, becoming the fifth Australian to move to the league during the 2019–20 season. She made her debut for the club on 23 February 2020, scoring in a 2–0 FA Cup victory over second division club Lewes. The following week, Foord made her second appearance, this time playing the full 90 minutes as Arsenal lost the 2020 FA Women's League Cup Final against Chelsea on 29 February.

During the 2020–21 season, Foord scored a brace against Tottenham Hotspur helping lift Arsenal to a 6–1 win.

In June 2023, Foord signed a new contract with the club. She gained her 100th appearance for Arsenal against Bristol City on 22 October 2023.

Foord kicked her first four goal haul for Arsenal during the club's 2024–25 UEFA Women's Champions League qualifier game against Rangers in September 2024, which they won 6-0. She was named Arsenal's player of the month for both September 2024 and October 2024. Foord also won the club-wide goal of the month for October 2024. On 6 February 2025, Foord made her 150th appearance for Arsenal in their narrow 1–2 loss to Manchester City in the Women's League Cup semi-final. She scored her 50th goal for the club against Liverpool on 22 March 2025. On 24 May 2025, Foord was part of the team that defeated Barcelona 1–0 to claim the 2024–25 UEFA Women's Champions League trophy.

Foord kicked the winning goal in the 2026 FIFA Women's Champions Cup final on 1 February in Arsenal's 3–2 victory over South American champions, Corinthians. She made her 200th appearance for Arsenal against Brighton & Hove Albion on 6 May 2026.

On 11 June 2026, Foord signed a new 2-year deal with the club.

== International career ==
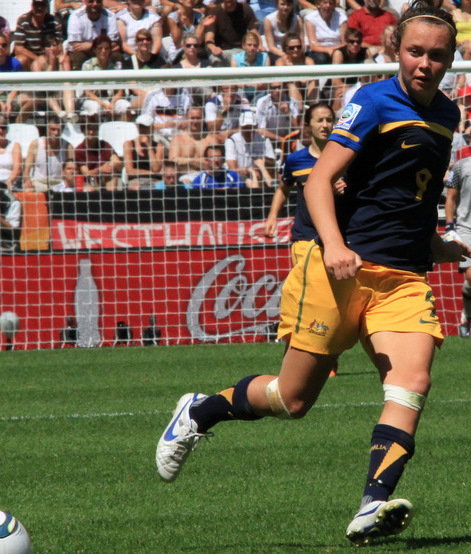
Foord playing for Australia at the 2011 FIFA Women's World Cup in Germany at age 16

Foord has represented Australia on the senior national team as well as the under-16 and under-17 national teams. As part of the Australian under-16 national team, Foord helped the team progress undefeated through to the AFC U17 Women's Championship by scoring a hat-trick in a match against the Philippines.

=== Senior national team, 2011–present ===
Foord made her debut for the Australia national team, the Matildas, on 12 May 2011 in a friendly against New Zealand in Gosford. She scored a goal in her debut, as Australia won the match 3–0.

At the age of 16, Foord was named to the Matildas squad for the 2011 FIFA Women's World Cup in Germany. Foord started in two of the three group matches as a right back. She then started in the midfield for Australia's quarter-final match against Sweden. She returned to the full-back position after Ellyse Perry was substituted for Tameka Butt in the 59th minute. The Matildas were eliminated from the competition after losing the match 3–1. Foord was given the "Best Young Player" award for the tournament. As a result of her play at the 2011 Women's World Cup, Foord was named AFC Youth Player of the year for 2011.

Foord was named to the Australian roster for the 2014 AFC Women's Asian Cup. She appeared in all 5 matches for Australia and scored a goal in their 2–2 draw against Japan in the group stage. Australia lost 1–0 to Japan in the final, but had already clinched a qualifying spot at the 2015 FIFA Women's World Cup.

In 2015, Foord was named to her second World Cup squad, this time as a forward. At the 2015 World Cup, Foord played every minute of Australia's five matches, with the Matildas eliminated in the quarter-finals by AFC rival, Japan.

Foord competed in her first Olympics in 2016. She scored a goal in Australia's 2–2 draw against Germany in the group stage. Australia was eliminated in the quarter-finals by Brazil on penalties.

In December 2016, Foord was named AFC Player of the year, becoming only the second player to win youth and senior player of the year awards.

At the 2017 Tournament of Nations, Foord scored two goals against Brazil, en route to a 6–1 Australian victory. Australia won the inaugural edition of the tournament.

Due to the foot injury she suffered in February 2018 during the W-League semi-final, Foord missed the 2018 Algarve Cup and the 2018 AFC Women's Asian Cup. She made her return to the Matildas line-up at the 2018 Tournament of Nations, where she made three substitute appearances.

Foord scored her first international hat-trick in a friendly game against Chile on 13 November 2018. Australia won the match 5–0.

In May 2019, Foord was named to her third World Cup Team. At the World Cup, Foord played in all four of Australia's matches. She scored a goal in the group stage against Brazil, helping Australia overcome a 2–0 deficit to win 3–2. Australia was eliminated by Norway in the Round of 16.

Foord was selected for the Matildas team which qualified for the Tokyo 2020 Olympics. The Matildas advanced to the quarter-finals with one victory and a draw in the group play. In the quarter-finals, they beat Great Britain 4–3 after extra time. However, they lost 1–0 to Sweden in the semi-final and were then beaten 4–3 in the bronze medal playoff by USA. On 8 April 2022, Foord played her 100th match for Australia in a 2–1 win over New Zealand in a friendly match.

At the 2023 FIFA Women's World Cup, in the Round of 16 against Denmark, Foord scored the opening goal in a 2-0 win.

On 4 June 2024, Foord was named in the Matildas team which qualified for the Paris 2024 Olympics, her third Olympic games.

Foord scored Australia's first goal in a 2–1 victory over China in the 2026 AFC Women's Asian Cup on 17 March 2026, helping the Matildas to reach the tournament's final.

== In popular media ==
External videos
- Aussies Abroad: The Matildas (ESPN) retrieved 12/18/2013

In 2013, Foord was featured in an hour-long episode of ESPN's Aussies Abroad entitled, The Matildas, which profiled four Australian national team players (Foord, Lisa De Vanna, Kyah Simon, and Sam Kerr) and their experience playing internationally. She starred in the film, Back Of The Net.

Foord was featured along with her national teammates in the EA Sports' FIFA video game series starting in FIFA 16, the first time women players were included in the game.

She is currently sponsored by Adidas, and in August 2023 appeared in the song Forums by Mallrat featuring Thatboykwame as part of the Back Of The Net Beats campaign.

== Personal life ==
Foord has been in a relationship with former Arsenal teammate and Irish international, Katie McCabe since May 2023. She was previously in a relationship with Swiss footballer Lia Wälti from 2020 until 2022.

== Career statistics ==
=== Club ===
As of match played 22 November 2026

Appearances and goals by club, season and competition
Club	Season	League			National cup		League cup		Continental		Other		Total	
Club	Season	Division	Apps	Goals	Apps	Goals	Apps	Goals	Apps	Goals	Apps	Goals	Apps	Goals
Sydney FC	2010–11	W-League	9	1	—		2 (Note: Appearance(s) in the W-League Finals series)	0	—		—		11	1
Sydney FC	2011–12	W-League	10	2	—		1	0	—		—		11	2
Sydney FC	2012–13	W-League	9	3	—		2	0	—		—		11	3
Sydney FC	2013–14	W-League	10	5	—		1	0	—		—		11	5
Sydney FC	Total		38	11	0	0	6	0	0	0	0	0	44	11
Sky Blue FC	2013	NWSL	15	0	—		0	0	—		—		15	0
Sky Blue FC	2014	NWSL	21	0	—		0	0	—		—		21	0
Sky Blue FC	2015	NWSL	10	0	—		0	0	—		—		10	0
Sky Blue FC	Total		46	0	0	0	0	0	0	0	0	0	46	0
Perth Glory	2014	W-League	11	5	—		2	0	—		—		13	5
Perth Glory	2015–16	W-League	7	1	—		0	0	—		—		7	1
Perth Glory	Total		18	6	0	0	2	0	0	0	0	0	20	6
Sydney FC	2016–17	W-League	9	2	—		1	0	—		—		10	2
Vegalta Sendai	2017	L.League	17	4	3	3	4	1	—		—		24	8
Sydney FC	2017–18	W-League	6	2	—		1	1	—		—		7	3
Sydney FC	2018–19	W-League	12	9	—		2	1	—		—		14	10
Sydney FC	2019–20	W-League	9	2	—		0	0	—		—		9	2
Sydney FC	Total		27	13	0	0	3	2	0	0	0	0	30	15
Portland Thorns	2018	NWSL	6	0	—		2 (Note: Appearance(s) in the NWSL Playoffs)	0	—		—		8	0
Portland Thorns	2019	NWSL	17	3	—		1	0	—		—		18	3
Portland Thorns	Total		23	3	0	0	3	0	0	0	0	0	26	3
Arsenal	2019–20	FA WSL	0	0	3	1	1	0	1	0	—		5	1
Arsenal	2020–21	FA WSL	21	10	1	0	3	2	—		—		25	12
Arsenal	2021–22	FA WSL	16	4	3	2	0	0	9	2	—		28	8
Arsenal	2022–23	FA WSL	19	6	2	1	3	1	9	4	—		33	12
Arsenal	2023–24	FA WSL	22	4	2	0	7	1	2	1	—		33	6
Arsenal	2024–25	FA WSL	20	6	2	0	1	0	15	7	—		38	13
Arsenal	2025–26	FA WSL	20	2	3	0	2	0	11	0	2 (Note: Appearance(s) in the FIFA Women's Champions Cup)	1	38	3
Arsenal	2026–27	FA WSL	11	0	0	0	—		5	0	—		16	0
Arsenal	Total		129	32	16	4	17	4	52	14	2	1	216	55
Career total			307	71	19	7	36	7	52	14	2	1	416	100

=== International ===
As of match played 13 October 2026
Scores and results list Australia's goal tally first, score column indicates score after each Foord goal.

List of international goals scored by Caitlin Foord
No.	Date	Venue	Opponent	Score	Result	Competition
1	12 May 2011	Bluetongue Stadium, Gosford, Australia	New Zealand	1–0	3–0	Friendly
2	14 May 2014	Thống Nhất Stadium, Ho Chi Minh City, Vietnam	Japan	1–0	2–2	2014 AFC Women's Asian Cup
3	12 February 2015	Bill McKinlay Park, Auckland, New Zealand	New Zealand	3–0	3–2	Friendly
4	19 May 2015	Valentine Sports Park, Sydney, Australia	Vietnam	2–0	4–0	Friendly
5	21 May 2015	Jubilee Oval, Sydney, Australia	Vietnam	11–0	11–0	Friendly
6	4 June 2016	Moreshead Park Stadium, Ballarat, Australia	New Zealand	1–0	2–0	Friendly
7	4 June 2016	Moreshead Park Stadium, Ballarat, Australia	New Zealand	2–0	2–0	Friendly
8	6 August 2016	Arena Corinthians, São Paulo, Brazil	Germany	2–0	2–2	2016 Summer Olympics
9	3 August 2017	StubHub Center, Carson, United States	Brazil	2–1	6–1	2017 Tournament of Nations
10	3 August 2017	StubHub Center, Carson, United States	Brazil	5–1	6–1	2017 Tournament of Nations
11	9 September 2017	McDonald Jones Stadium, Newcastle, Australia	Brazil	2–1	3–2	Friendly
12	13 November 2018	McDonald Jones Stadium, Newcastle, Australia	Chile	2–0	5–0	Friendly
13	13 November 2018	McDonald Jones Stadium, Newcastle, Australia	Chile	3–0	5–0	Friendly
14	13 November 2018	McDonald Jones Stadium, Newcastle, Australia	Chile	5–0	5–0	Friendly
15	6 March 2019	AAMI Park, Melbourne, Australia	Argentina	3–0	3–0	2019 Cup of Nations
16	4 April 2019	Dick's Sporting Goods Park, Commerce City, United States	United States	2–1	3–5	Friendly
17	13 June 2019	Stade de la Mosson, Montpellier, France	Brazil	1–2	3–2	2019 FIFA Women's World Cup
18	7 February 2020	Campbelltown Stadium, Sydney, Australia	Chinese Taipei	1–0	7–0	2020 Olympic Qualifying
19	7 February 2020	Campbelltown Stadium, Sydney, Australia	Chinese Taipei	2–0	7–0	2020 Olympic Qualifying
20	7 February 2020	Campbelltown Stadium, Sydney, Australia	Chinese Taipei	4–0	7–0	2020 Olympic Qualifying
21	5 August 2021	Kashima Soccer Stadium, Kashima, Japan	United States	2–4	3–4	2020 Summer Olympics
22	21 January 2022	Mumbai Football Arena, Mumbai, India	Indonesia	3–0	18–0	2022 AFC Women's Asian Cup
23	8 October 2022	Kingsmeadow, London, England	South Africa	4–0	4–1	Friendly
24	11 October 2022	Viborg Stadium, Viborg, Denmark	Denmark	1–1	3–1	Friendly
25	11 October 2022	Viborg Stadium, Viborg, Denmark	Denmark	3–1	3–1	Friendly
26	12 November 2022	AAMI Park, Melbourne, Australia	Sweden	2–0	4–0	Friendly
27	12 November 2022	AAMI Park, Melbourne, Australia	Sweden	4–0	4–0	Friendly
28	19 February 2023	CommBank Stadium, Sydney, Australia	Spain	3–0	3–2	2023 Cup of Nations
29	22 February 2023	McDonald Jones Stadium, Newcastle, Australia	Jamaica	3–0	3–0	2023 Cup of Nations
30	7 August 2023	Stadium Australia, Sydney, Australia	Denmark	1–0	2–0	2023 FIFA Women's World Cup
31	29 October 2023	Perth Stadium, Perth, Australia	Philippines	3–0	8–0	2024 AFC Women's Olympic Qualifying Tournament
32	29 October 2023	Perth Stadium, Perth, Australia	Philippines	4–0	8–0	2024 AFC Women's Olympic Qualifying Tournament
33	29 October 2023	Perth Stadium, Perth, Australia	Philippines	7–0	8–0	2024 AFC Women's Olympic Qualifying Tournament
34	24 February 2024	Milliy Stadium, Tashkent, Uzbekistan	Uzbekistan	3–0	3–0	2024 AFC Women's Olympic Qualifying Tournament
35	28 February 2024	Marvel Stadium, Melbourne, Australia	Uzbekistan	7–0	10–0	2024 AFC Women's Olympic Qualifying Tournament
36	9 April 2024	Toyota Field, San Antonio, United States	Mexico	2–0	2–0	Friendly
37	25 October 2024	Stadion Letzigrund, Zurich, Switzerland	Switzerland	1–0	1–1	Friendly
38	28 November 2024	Suncorp Stadium, Brisbane, Australia	Brazil	1–2	1–3	Friendly
39	25 October 2025	Cardiff City Stadium, Cardiff, Wales	Wales	2–1	2–1	Friendly
40	17 March 2026	Perth Stadium, Perth, Australia	China	1–0	2–1	2026 AFC Women's Asian Cup
41	9 June 2026	CommBank Stadium, Sydney, Australia	Mexico	3–1	3–1	Friendly
42	13 October 2026	Stade Walter-Luzi, Chambly, France	Haiti	4–1	7–1	Friendly

== Honours ==
Sydney FC

- W-League Premiership: 2010–11
- W-League Championship: 2012–13, 2018–19

Perth Glory

- W-League Premiership: 2014

Arsenal

- FA Women's League Cup: 2022–23 2023-24
- UEFA Women's Champions League: 2024–25
- FIFA Women's Champions Cup: 2026

Australia U16

- AFF U-16 Women's Championship: 2009

Australia

- AFC Olympic Qualifying Tournament: 2016
- Tournament of Nations: 2017
- FIFA Series: 2026

Individual

- FIFA Women's World Cup Best Women's Young Player: 2011
- Asian Women's Young Footballer of the Year: 2011
- Football Federation Australia U20 Women's Footballer of the Year: 2011
- Asian Women's Footballer of the Year: 2016
- PFA W-League Team of the Season: 2017-18, 2018-2019
- PFA WSL Fans Player of the Month: January 2024
- Arsenal Player of the Month: September 2024, October 2024, April 2025
- Arsenal Emirates Goal of the Month: October 2024

== See also ==
- List of W-League (Australia) hat-tricks
- List of Australia women's international soccer players
- List of women's footballers with 100 or more international caps
