= Kyah Simon =

Australian footballer (born 1991)

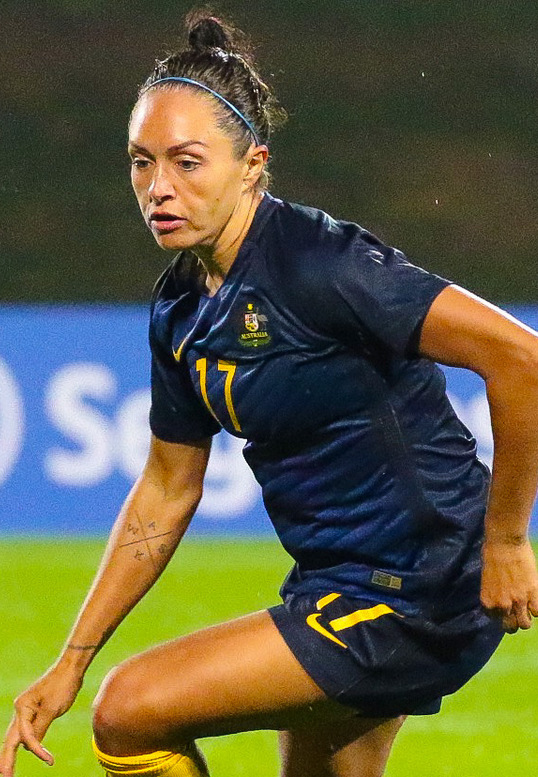
- Simon playing at the 2017 Algarve Cup

Personal information
- Full name: Kyah Pam Simon
- Date of birth: 25 June 1991 (age 35)
- Place of birth: Blacktown, Australia
- Height: 1.65 m (5 ft 5 in)
- Position: Striker

Team information
- Current team: Hibernian
- Number: 71

Senior career*
Years	Team	Apps	(Gls)
2008–2009	Central Coast Mariners	9	(5)
2009–2013	Sydney FC	41	(23)
2012–2013	Boston Breakers	30	(16)
2013–2014	Western Sydney Wanderers	0	(0)
2014–2017	Sydney FC	27	(12)
2015–2016	Boston Breakers	23	(3)
2017–2020	Melbourne City	31	(10)
2018–2019	Houston Dash	25	(4)
2020–2021	PSV	7	(2)
2021–2023	Tottenham Hotspur	14	(3)
2023–2024	Central Coast Mariners	12	(3)
2024–2025	Sydney FC	0	(0)
2025–2026	Dijon FCO	3	(0)
2026–	Hibernian	0	(0)

International career^{‡}
2008–2009	Australia U-20	15	(10)
2007–2023	Australia	111	(29)
- * Club domestic league appearances and goals as of 28 May 2024 ‡ National team caps and goals as of 20 July 2023

Kyah Pam Simon (born 25 June 1991) is an Australian professional soccer player who plays as a striker for Hibernian. She has represented Australia from 2007 to 2023, making 111 caps and scoring 29 goals. In 2011, Simon became the first Indigenous Australian player to score a goal in a FIFA Women's World Cup.

Simon has played for Sydney FC, Central Coast Mariners, Western Sydney Wanderers, and Melbourne City in the Australian A-League Women, as well as Boston Breakers and Houston Dash in the American National Women's Soccer League (NWSL).

== Early life and education ==
Kyah Pam Simon, who is of Aboriginal Australian descent, was born on 25 June 1991 in the western suburbs of Sydney in New South Wales, one of four children. Her mother, Pam, is of the Anaiwan people, while her father, Gordon, is of the Biripi people. The family moved to Quakers Hill when she was a year old and she attended school at Pacific Hills Christian School, with her siblings. She only later realised what enormous sacrifices her parents had made for their children to attend private school, and to support her career. She later attended Hills Sports High School, where Alen Stajcic (later coach of the Matildas) was head coach.

Growing up amongst a family of rugby league players, Simon was introduced to soccer by her neighbors, and began playing for the Quakers Hill under-8s and fell in love with the game. As a youth, she played for the Hills Brumbies before moving across to Penrith Nepean United. At age 15, she broke her leg just on the verge of earning a scholarship with the NSW Institute of Sport, but that did not deter her from pursuing her dream. She made her national debut for the Australia women's national soccer team the following year at age 16.

== Club career ==
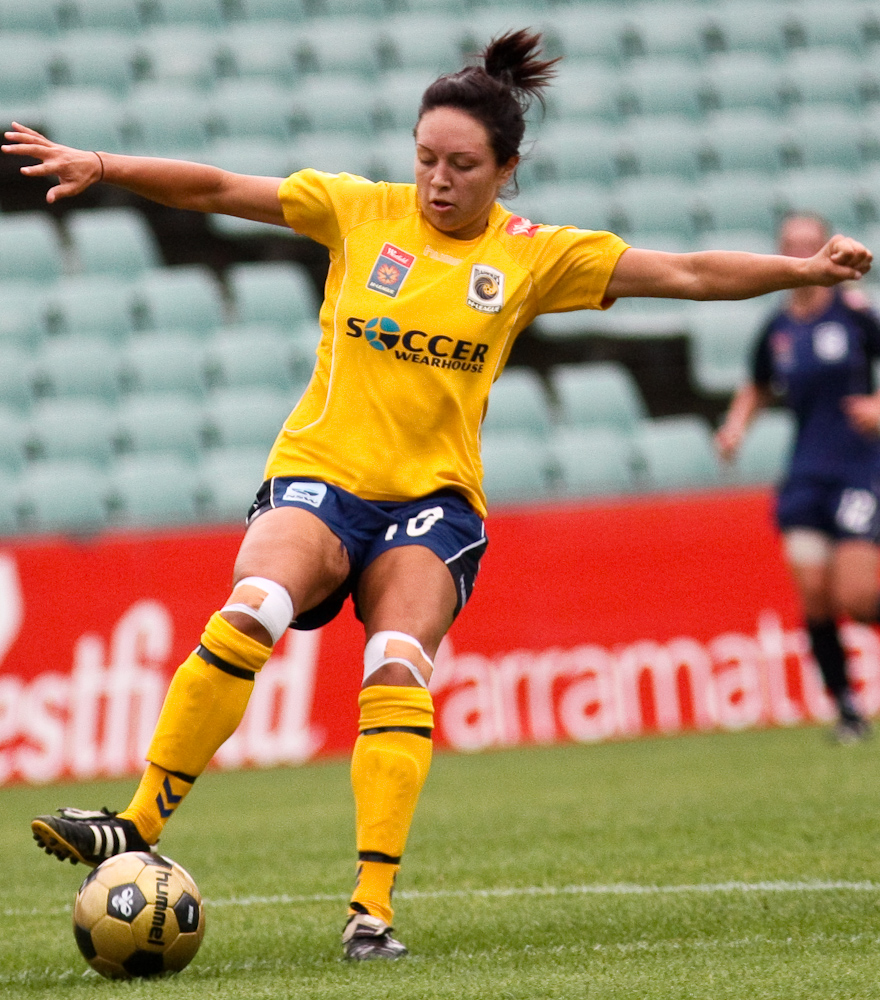
Simon playing for the Central Coast Mariners

=== Central Coast Mariners ===
Simon made her debut for the Central Coast Mariners against Melbourne Victory on Saturday, 25 October 2008. Simon then made her scoring debut during Round 3 against Canberra United, scoring a double to assist the Mariners to a 2–1 win away from home.

=== Sydney FC ===
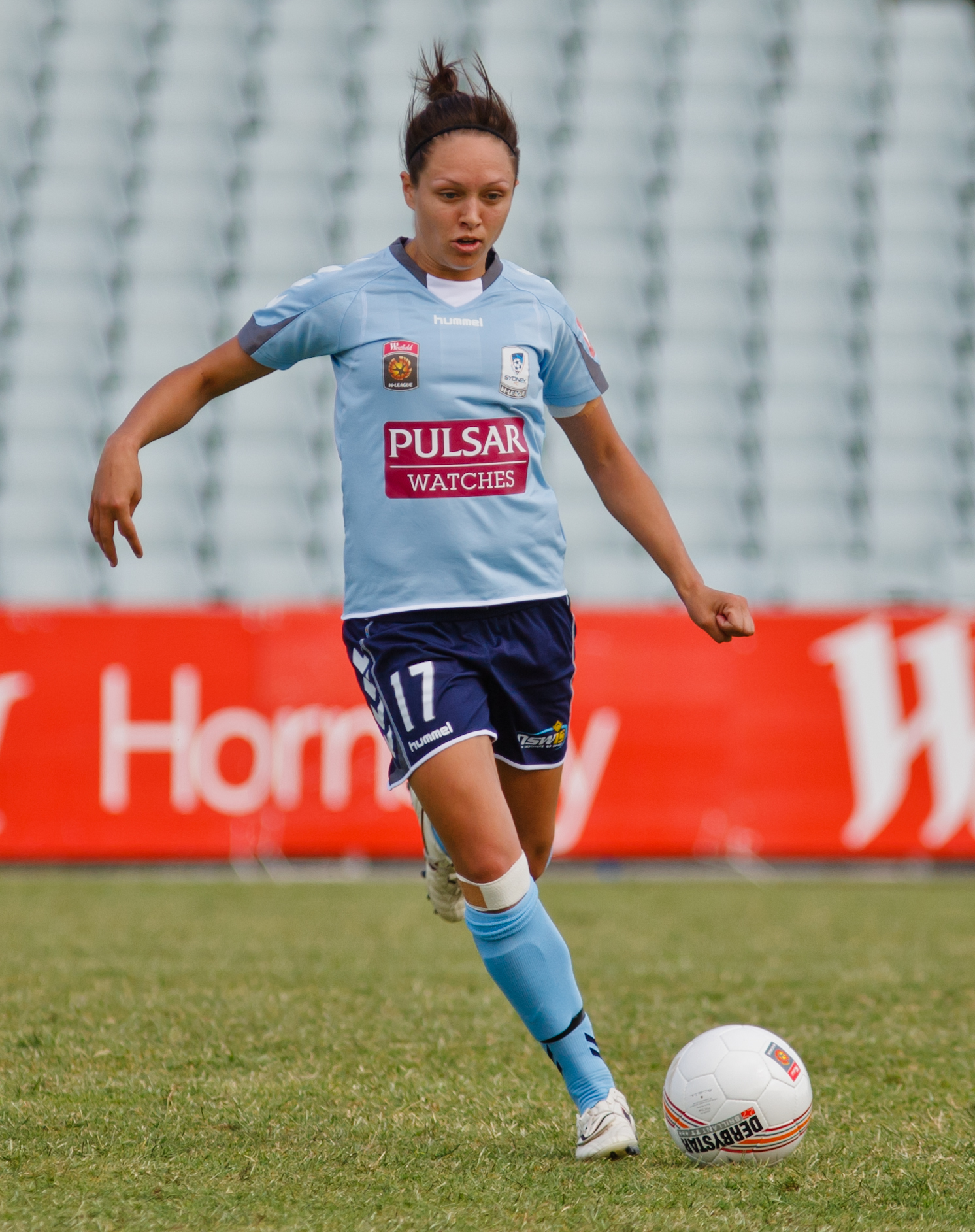
Simon playing for Sydney FC

Simon joined Sydney FC for the 2009 W-League Season, playing in the first round against former club the Central Coast Mariners.

She was the top scorer in the 2010–11 W-League with 11 goals in 12 games. She also earned Player of the Year, Young Player of the Year and Players Player of the Year honours.

=== Boston Breakers ===
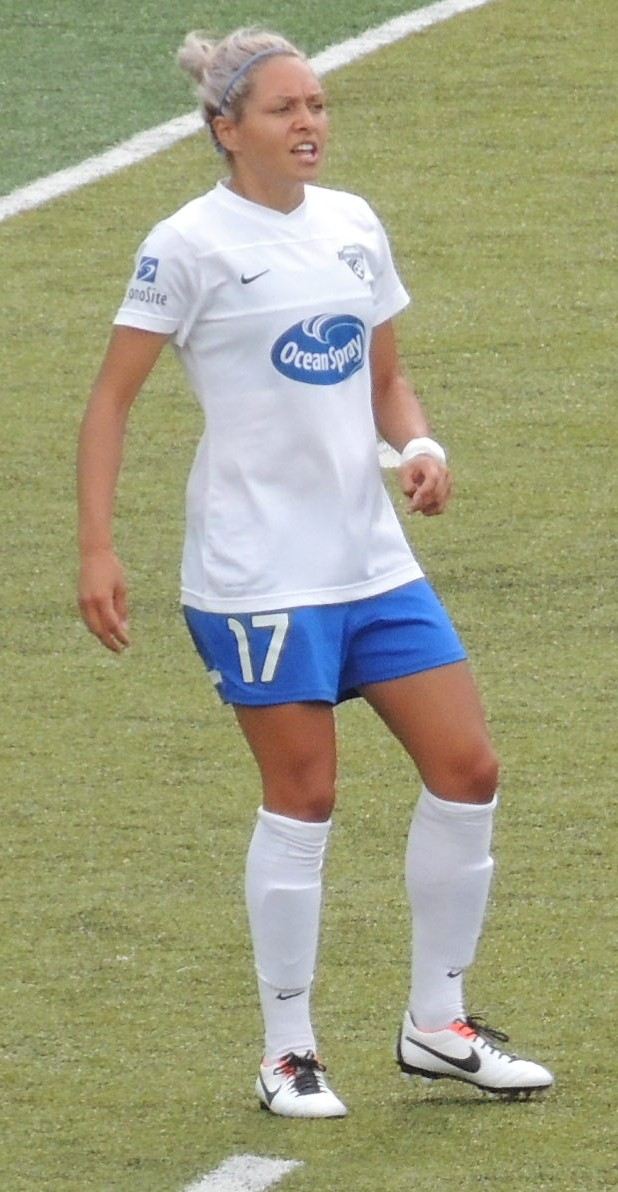
Simon playing for the Boston Breakers

In April 2012, Simon signed with the Boston Breakers for the first and only season of the Women's Premier Soccer League Elite (WPSL Elite). She finished the season as the team's leading scorer with 12 goals and 26 points. She also ranked second in the league in the same categories. Simon logged 1,052 minutes with the Breakers and finished with two assists.

In 2013, Simon signed as a free agent with the Breakers for the inaugural season of the National Women's Soccer League.

=== Western Sydney Wanderers ===
In September 2013, Simon signed with Western Sydney Wanderers.

=== Return to Sydney FC ===
After being injured for most of the 2013–14 season and hardly playing, Simon returned to Sydney FC for the 2014 season.

=== Return to Boston Breakers ===
On 30 June 2015, after leading the Australia women's national soccer team to a quarter-final of the 2015 FIFA Women's World Cup, the Boston Breakers announced the signing of Simon, returning her to the National Women's Soccer League.

In January 2017, citing a need to "get my mind and body back to 100 percent health and fitness, and be ready for the next season", it was announced that Simon would not return to the Boston Breakers for the 2017 season. The Breakers retained the rights to her contract for the 2017 season.

=== Melbourne City ===
On 6 October 2017, Simon returned to Australia, joining Melbourne City. She missed much of 2018 due to successive injuries, shoulder reconstruction, Achilles tendinitis and, in November 2018 an ankle injury. She missed the rest of the 2018–19 season due to rehab.

=== Houston Dash ===
After the Breakers folded ahead of the 2018 NWSL season, the NWSL held a dispersal draft to distribute Breakers players across the league. Her rights were selected 6th overall by Houston. On 28 February, the Dash announced they signed Simon to a contract. She made her debut for the Dash on 28 April against the North Carolina Courage in a 2–0 loss. Simon scored her first goal of the season in a 1–1 draw against the Portland Thorns FC on 9 May. Following the 2019 NWSL season, the Dash and Kyah came to a mutual agreement to depart the club, placing her on the re-entry wire.

=== Return to Central Coast Mariners ===
In October 2023, Simon re-signed with Central Coast Mariners. On 28 January 2024, Simon made her first appearance of the season as a 83rd minute substitute in a 2–0 win over Newcastle Jets. This was Simon's first match after 480 days, after spending a lengthy period of time out due to injury. In August 2024, the club announced her departure.

=== Return to Sydney FC ===
In September 2024, Simon returned to former club Sydney FC, signing for the 2024–25 A-League Women season. Simon was released by the club after one season, having not made a single appearance for the club.

=== Dijon FCO ===
In October 2025, Simon was signed by French club Dijon FCO.

=== Hibernian ===
In August 2026, Simon signed a one-year contract with Scottish club Hibernian.

== International career ==
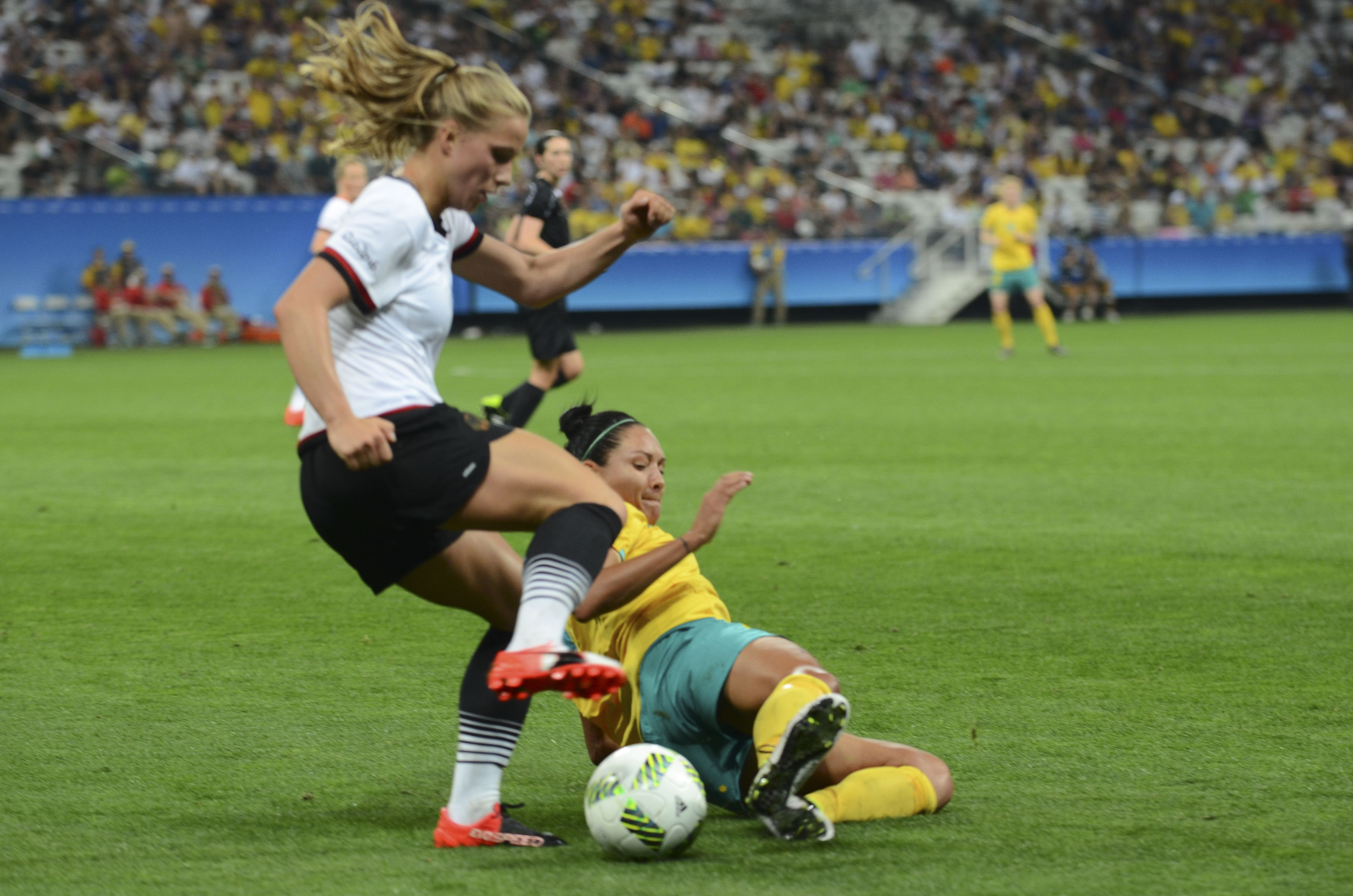
Simon slides for the ball during a match against Germany at the 2016 Olympics

Simon made her debut for the Matildas in August 2007, at the age of 16, in a match against Hong Kong. She scored her first goal in a win over Brazil in the 2008 Peace Cup. In 2010, she scored the winning penalty for Australia to win the 2010 Asian Cup.

Simon appeared at the 2011 FIFA Women's World Cup, where she scored both of Australia's goals in a 2–1 win over Norway to ensure qualification for the quarter finals. She was the first male or female Indigenous Australian player to score a goal in a World Cup tournament.

During the 2015 FIFA Women's World Cup round of 16 match against higher ranked Brazil, Simon slotted in the winning goal on a rebound after an initial attempt by Lisa De Vanna bounced off the Brazilian goalkeeper Luciana. The Matildas qualified for a historic quarter-final match after the 1–0 win against Brazil, however were knocked out by Japan in the quarterfinal. Simon played each of Australia's 5 matches and scored 3 goals, including both goals in a 2–0 win against Nigeria in group stage.

Following rehab after injuries during 2018 (see above), she was named as a stand-by player for Australia's 2019 FIFA Women's World Cup squad in May. However, during the training camp, Simon was injured again and was unavailable.

During the 2020 Tokyo Olympics, Simon became the ninth Matilda and first Indigenous Australian player to reach 100 caps. The Matildas qualified for the quarter-finals and beat Great Britain before being eliminated in the semi-final with Sweden. In the playoff for the Bronze medal they were beaten by the USA. The striker had an Anterior cruciate ligament injury (ACL) in October 2022 and was still recovering in June of the following year when she was named for the home FIFA Women's World Cup squad. She spent the entire tournament on the substitutes bench.

== Other activities ==
Simon has learnt about the hardships and discrimination endured by her grandparents' families, which gave her new appreciation for what her family has given her. She has said "...every time I pull on the Matildas jersey, it's for my family. As I see it, the jersey is as much theirs as mine".

She is proud of her Aboriginal heritage, and appreciates social media for the role it plays in helping to "change that conversation [about what it means to be Aboriginal] and open people's eyes to get different perspectives". Simon was instrumental in the Matildas' decision to display the Aboriginal flag in the team photo for their first game of the Tokyo Olympics, as a uniquely Australian gesture, rather than taking the knee in solidarity with the Black Lives Matter movement. She has joined Football Australia's inaugural National Indigenous Advisory Group to help foster engagement between the game and Aboriginal and Torres Strait Islander people.

== In popular culture ==
=== Television and film ===
In 2013, Simon was featured in an hour-long episode of ESPN's Aussies Abroad entitled, The Matildas, which profiled four Australian national team players (Simon, Lisa De Vanna, Samantha Kerr, and Caitlin Foord) and their experience playing internationally.

Simon was also one of the subjects, the other being Lydia Williams, of a football documentary titled No Apologies by filmmaker Ashley Morrison. This documentary tells the story of the two Aboriginal female footballers and their journey to the Women's World Cup in Germany in 2011.

=== Magazines ===
In June 2011, Simon was on the cover of the Australian FourFourTwo Magazine along with fellow Matildas Melissa Barbieri, Sam Kerr, Thea Slatyer and Sarah Walsh.

== Personal life ==
Simon is in a relationship with Faye Bryson. Her cousin, Gema Simon, was also an Australian international footballer.

== Career statistics ==
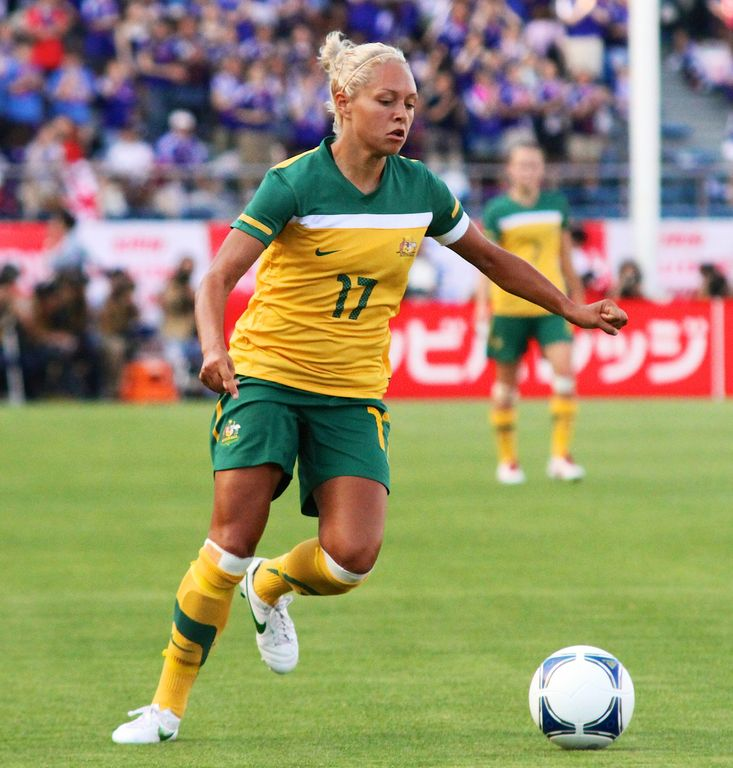
Kyah Simon playing against Japan in Tokyo, June 2012

=== International ===
As of 19 August 2023

Australia national team
Year	Apps	Goals
2007	1	0
2008	11	1
2009	0	0
2010	10	1
2011	11	5
2012	7	4
2013	2	0
2014	0	0
2015	18	5
2016	12	5
2017	6	2
2018	9	1
2019	0	0
2020	5	2
2021	13	1
2022	6	2
Total	111	29

Scores and results list Australia's goal tally first, score column indicates score after each Simon goal.

List of international goals scored by Kyah Simon
#	Date	Venue	Opponent	Score	Result	Competition
1	19 June 2008	Suwon Sports Complex, Suwon, South Korea	Brazil	1–0	1–0	2008 Peace Queen Cup
2	6 March 2010	Ballymore Stadium, Brisbane, Australia	North Korea	3–2	3–2	Friendly
3	12 May 2011	Bluetongue Stadium, Gosford, Australia	New Zealand	2–0	3–0	Friendly
4	20 June 2011	Jahnstadion, Göttingen, Germany	Mexico	3–2	3–2	Friendly
5	6 July 2011	BayArena, Leverkusen, Germany	Norway	1–1	2–1	2011 FIFA Women's World Cup
6	6 July 2011	BayArena, Leverkusen, Germany	Norway	2–1	2–1	2011 FIFA Women's World Cup
7	3 September 2011	Jinan Olympic Sports Center Stadium, Jinan, China	Thailand	1–0	5–1	2012 Olympics qualifying
8	13 September 2012	Carroll Stadium, Indianapolis, United States	Haiti	3–0	4–0	Friendly
9	20 November 2012	Bao'an Stadium, Shenzhen, China	Chinese Taipei	3–0	7–0	2013 EAFF Women's East Asian Cup
10	20 November 2012	Bao'an Stadium, Shenzhen, China	Chinese Taipei	6–0	7–0	2013 EAFF Women's East Asian Cup
11	22 November 2012	Bao'an Stadium, Shenzhen, China	Hong Kong	2–0	4–0	2013 EAFF Women's East Asian Cup
12	19 May 2015	Valentine Sports Park, Sydney, Australia	Vietnam	3–0	4–0	Friendly
13	12 June 2015	Winnipeg Stadium, Winnipeg, Canada	Nigeria	1–0	2–0	2015 FIFA Women's World Cup
14	12 June 2015	Winnipeg Stadium, Winnipeg, Canada	Nigeria	2–0	2–0	2015 FIFA Women's World Cup
15	21 June 2015	Moncton Stadium, Moncton, Canada	Brazil	1–0	1–0	2015 FIFA Women's World Cup
16	29 November 2015	Incheon Sungui Stadium, Incheon, South Korea	South Korea	1–0	1–0	Friendly
17	2 March 2016	Nagai Stadium, Osaka, Japan	Vietnam	2–0	9–0	2016 Olympics qualifying
18	2 March 2016	Nagai Stadium, Osaka, Japan	Vietnam	4–0	9–0	2016 Olympics qualifying
19	2 March 2016	Nagai Stadium, Osaka, Japan	Vietnam	5–0	9–0	2016 Olympics qualifying
20	4 March 2016	Nagai Stadium, Osaka, Japan	South Korea	1–0	2–0	2016 Olympics qualifying
21	9 August 2016	Itaipava Arena Fonte Nova, Salvador, Brazil	Zimbabwe	4–0	6–1	2016 Summer Olympics
22	8 March 2017	Albufeira Municipal Stadium, Albufeira, Portugal	Denmark	1–0	1–1	2017 Algarve Cup
23	26 November 2017	GMHBA Stadium, Geelong, Australia	China	1–1	5–1	Friendly
24	10 April 2018	Amman International Stadium, Amman, Jordan	Vietnam	1–0	8–0	2018 AFC Women's Asian Cup
25	10 February 2020	Campbelltown Stadium, Campbelltown, Sydney, Australia	Thailand	3–0	6–0	2020 Olympic Qualifying Tournament
26	10 February 2020	Campbelltown Stadium, Campbelltown, Sydney, Australia	Thailand	6–0	6–0	2020 Olympic Qualifying Tournament
27	30 November 2021	McDonald Jones Stadium, Newcastle, Australia	United States	1–1	1–1	Friendly
28	21 January 2022	Mumbai Football Arena, Mumbai, India	Indonesia	14–0	18–0	2022 AFC Women's Asian Cup
29	21 January 2022	Mumbai Football Arena, Mumbai, India	Indonesia	16–0	18–0	2022 AFC Women's Asian Cup

== Honours ==
Sydney

- W-League Championship: 2009, 2012–13
- W-League Premiership: 2009, 2010–11

Melbourne City

- W-League Championship: 2017–18

Australia

- AFC Women's Asian Cup: 2010
- AFC Olympic Qualifying Tournament: 2016

Individual

- Julie Dolan Medal: 2010–11
- W-League Golden Boot: 2010–11
- W-League Young Player of the Year: 2010–11

== See also ==
- List of A-League Women hat-tricks
- List of Indigenous Australian sportspeople
- List of Australian sportswomen
- List of Australia women's international soccer players
- List of association football families
- List of women's footballers with 100 or more international caps
