= List of A-League Women hat-tricks =

Since the A-League Women's inaugural season in 2008–09 as the W-League, nearly fifty players have scored hat-tricks in A-League Women matches by scoring three goals in one game. In addition, five players have scored more than three goals in a A-League Women regular season match. The first hat-trick was scored by Sandra Scalzi for Adelaide United in a win over Newcastle Jets.

== Hat-tricks ==
Key
^{4}	Player scored four goals
^{5}	Player scored five goals
*	The home team

Note: The results column shows the player's team score first

Player	Nationality	For	Against	Result	Date	Ref
Sandra Scalzi	Australia	Adelaide United*	Newcastle Jets	3–2	31 October 2008	
Michelle Heyman	Australia	Central Coast Mariners	Adelaide United*	6–0	14 November 2009	
Tameka Yallop	Australia	Brisbane Roar	Newcastle Jets*	6–0	5 December 2009	
Michelle Heyman	Australia	Canberra United	Perth Glory*	4–1	7 November 2010	
Tara Andrews ^{4}	Australia	Newcastle Jets*	Adelaide United	7–1	8 January 2011	
Kyah Simon	Australia	Sydney FC	Perth Glory*	5–1	9 January 2011	
Michelle Heyman	Australia	Canberra United*	Perth Glory	3–2	29 October 2011	
Tameka Yallop	Australia	Brisbane Roar	Perth Glory*	5–2	19 November 2011	
Caitlin Friend	Australia	Melbourne Victory*	Adelaide United	4–0	19 November 2011	
Kylie Ledbrook	Australia	Sydney FC*	Perth Glory	11–0	3 December 2011	
Renee Rollason	Australia	Sydney FC*	Perth Glory	11–0	3 December 2011	
Leena Khamis	Australia	Sydney FC*	Perth Glory	11–0	3 December 2011	
Jodie Taylor	England	Melbourne Victory	Perth Glory*	5–0	10 December 2011	
Sarah McLaughlin	New Zealand	Adelaide United*	Western Sydney Wanderers	4–3	20 October 2012	
Kate Gill	Australia	Perth Glory	Newcastle Jets*	6–1	10 November 2012	
Rosie Sutton	Australia	Perth Glory*	Sydney FC	3–1	17 November 2012	
Lisa De Vanna	Australia	Perth Glory	Sydney FC*	7–5	15 December 2012	
Emily Gielnik	Australia	Brisbane Roar*	Adelaide United	6–2	22 December 2012	
Kyah Simon	Australia	Sydney FC	Newcastle Jets*	4–0	23 December 2012	
Tameka Yallop	Australia	Brisbane Roar*	Canberra United	5–1	12 January 2013	
Katrina Gorry	Australia	Brisbane Roar	Western Sydney Wanderers*	4–1	1 December 2013	
Caitlin Friend	Australia	Melbourne Victory*	Newcastle Jets	6–0	7 December 2013	
Caitlin Foord	Australia	Sydney FC*	Perth Glory	8–2	5 January 2014	
Lisa De Vanna	Australia	Melbourne Victory	Newcastle Jets*	4–1	25 January 2014	
Kate Gill ^{5}	Australia	Perth Glory	Western Sydney Wanderers*	10–1	5 October 2014	
Amy Jackson	Australia	Melbourne Victory*	Adelaide United	4–0	12 October 2014	
Racheal Quigley	Australia	Melbourne Victory*	Newcastle Jets	4–0	22 November 2014	
Sam Kerr	Australia	Perth Glory	Sydney FC*	5–0	30 November 2014	
Rosie Sutton	Australia	Adelaide United	Melbourne Victory*	4–0	8 November 2015	
Natasha Dowie	England	Melbourne Victory	Brisbane Roar*	4–1	1 January 2017	
Ashleigh Sykes ^{4}	Australia	Canberra United*	Perth Glory	7–2	14 January 2017	
Adriana Jones	Australia	Adelaide United*	Western Sydney Wanderers	10–2	14 January 2017	
Sofia Huerta	Mexico	Adelaide United*	Western Sydney Wanderers	10–2	14 January 2017	
Arin Gilliland	United States	Newcastle Jets	Sydney FC*	3–1	21 January 2017	
Rachel Hill	United States	Perth Glory	Brisbane Roar*	4–1	5 November 2017	
Makenzy Doniak	United States	Adelaide United*	Perth Glory	3–1	10 November 2017	
Arin Gilliland	United States	Newcastle Jets	Brisbane Roar*	3–0	10 December 2017	
Sam Kerr	Australia	Perth Glory	Newcastle Jets*	3–3	16 December 2017	
Elise Thorsnes	Norway	Canberra United*	Adelaide United	6–1	7 January 2018	
Sam Kerr	Australia	Perth Glory*	Canberra United	4–4	20 January 2018	
Katie Stengel	United States	Newcastle Jets	Canberra United*	5–1	28 January 2018	
Jasmyne Spencer	United States	Melbourne City*	Sydney FC	3–1	2 November 2018	
Natasha Dowie	England	Melbourne Victory	Sydney FC*	3–2	25 November 2018	
Caitlin Foord	Australia	Sydney FC*	Brisbane Roar	5–1	9 December 2018	
Sam Kerr	Australia	Perth Glory	Melbourne Victory*	4–2 (a.e.t.)	10 February 2019	
Kristen Hamilton	United States	Western Sydney Wanderers	Brisbane Roar*	3–1	28 November 2019	
Michelle Heyman	Australia	Canberra United*	Adelaide United	4–3	30 December 2020	
Emily Gielnik	Australia	Brisbane Roar*	Adelaide United	4–2	12 March 2021	
Melina Ayres	Australia	Melbourne Victory	Brisbane Roar*	6–2	4 April 2021	
Hannah Wilkinson ^{5}	New Zealand	Melbourne City	Melbourne Victory*	5–1	26 December 2021	
Mackenzie Hawkesby	Australia	Sydney FC	Wellington Phoenix*	5–0	30 December 2021	
María José Rojas	Chile	Sydney FC*	Canberra United	6–0	15 January 2022	
Fiona Worts ^{5}	England	Adelaide United	Brisbane Roar*	8–2	13 February 2022	
Fiona Worts	England	Adelaide United*	Melbourne Victory	3–0	26 February 2022	
Larissa Crummer	Australia	Brisbane Roar	Newcastle Jets*	5–1	4 March 2022	
Michelle Heyman	Australia	Canberra United	Brisbane Roar*	3–3	10 March 2022	
Sarah Griffith	United States	Newcastle Jets*	Western Sydney Wanderers	4–2	26 November 2022	
Kayla Morrison	United States	Melbourne Victory*	Newcastle Jets	5–2	18 December 2022	
Princess Ibini-Isei	Australia	Sydney FC	Melbourne Victory*	6–3	26 January 2023	
Michelle Heyman	Australia	Canberra United*	Adelaide United	4–2	4 March 2023	
Melina Ayres	Australia	Melbourne Victory	Melbourne City*	4–3 (a.e.t.)	15 April 2023	
Holly McNamara	Australia	Melbourne City*	Western Sydney Wanderers	4–3	12 November 2023	
Millie Farrow	England	Perth Glory	Melbourne City*	3–1	9 December 2023	
Vesna Milivojević	Serbia	Canberra United*	Brisbane Roar	5–1	10 December 2023	
Emina Ekic	Bosnia and Herzegovina	Melbourne City*	Brisbane Roar	5–3	28 December 2023	
Daniela Galic	Australia	Melbourne City	Adelaide United*	5–0	6 January 2024	
Sarina Bolden	Philippines	Newcastle Jets*	Brisbane Roar	3–0	17 February 2024	
Hannah Keane	United States	Western United*	Canberra United	4–2	1 March 2024	
Emily Gielnik	Australia	Melbourne Victory*	Adelaide United	4–1	10 March 2024	
Emily Gielnik	Australia	Melbourne Victory*	Western United	4–1	17 November 2024	
Sienna Saveska	Australia	Western Sydney Wanderers*	Western United	5–1	14 December 2024	
Laini Freier	Australia	Brisbane Roar	Newcastle Jets*	6–1	21 December 2024	
Laini Freier	Australia	Brisbane Roar	Western United *	8–2	29 December 2024	
Holly McNamara	Australia	Melbourne City*	Western United	5–1	4 February 2025	
Holly McNamara	Australia	Melbourne City*	Adelaide United	4–3	16 March 2025	
Tameka Yallop	Australia	Brisbane Roar*	Western Sydney Wanderers	4–4	13 April 2025	
Kennedy White	United States	Melbourne Victory	Western Sydney Wanderers*	4–1	9 November 2025	
Holly McNamara	Australia	Melbourne City*	Perth Glory	3–1	28 December 2025	
Pia Vlok	New Zealand	Wellington Phoenix	Newcastle Jets*	5–1	1 February 2026	
Daisy Brown	Australia	Brisbane Roar*	Newcastle Jets	4–2	20 March 2026	

== Multiple hat-tricks ==
The following table lists the number of hat-tricks scored by players who have scored two or more hat-tricks.

As of 2 February 2026

Rank	Player	Hat-tricks
1	(Australia) Michelle Heyman	6
2	(Australia) Emily Gielnik	4
2	(Australia) Sam Kerr	4
2	(Australia) Holly McNamara	4
2	(Australia) Tameka Yallop	4
6	(Australia) Melina Ayres	2
6	(Australia) Lisa De Vanna	2
6	(England) Natasha Dowie	2
6	(Australia) Caitlin Foord	2
6	(Australia) Laini Freier	2
6	(Australia) Caitlin Friend	2
6	(Australia) Kate Gill	2
6	(United States) Arin Gilliland	2
6	(Australia) Kyah Simon	2
6	(Australia) Rosie Sutton	2
6	(England) Fiona Worts	2

== Fastest hat-tricks ==
Minutes	Player	Match	Date
7	(Australia) Sam Kerr	Newcastle Jets v Perth Glory	16 December 2017
7	(United States) Kennedy White	Western Sydney Wanderers v Melbourne Victory	9 November 2025
11	(New Zealand) Sarah McLaughlin	Adelaide United v Western Sydney Wanderers	20 October 2012
11	(Australia) Kate Gill	Western Sydney Wanderers v Perth Glory	5 October 2014
15	(Norway) Elise Thorsnes	Canberra United v Adelaide United	7 January 2018
16	(Australia) Michelle Heyman	Canberra United v Perth Glory	29 October 2011
16	(Australia) Leena Khamis	Sydney FC v Perth Glory	3 December 2011
17	(Australia) Sienna Saveska	Western Sydney Wanderers v Western United	14 December 2024
18	(Australia) Emily Gielnik	Brisbane Roar v Adelaide United	12 March 2021
19	(Australia) Melina Ayres	Melbourne City v Melbourne Victory	15 April 2023
19	(Australia) Daniela Galic	Melbourne City v Adelaide United	28 December 2023

== See also ==
- A-League Women records and statistics
