= Kylie =

Kylie may refer to:

- Kylie (name), a female given name
  - Kylie Jenner (born 1997), television personality and cosmetics company executive
  - Kylie Minogue (born 1968), Australian singer
  - Kylie Sonique Love (born 1983) American drag performer and winner of RuPaul's Drag Race All Stars season 6.

== Music ==
- Kylie (album), 1988 album by Minogue
- Kylie Minogue (album), 1994 album by Minogue
- Kylie and Garibay, musical duo including Minogue
- "Kylie" (song), by Akcent

== Other uses ==
- Kylie, a type of non-returning boomerang

== See also ==
- Kiley (disambiguation)
- Kylee (born 1994), an American-Japanese singer
- Life of Kylie, an American reality television series
