= Kylie Peters =

Australian cricketer

Personal information
- Born: c. 1975 (age 50–51)
- Role: All-rounder

Domestic team information
- Years: Team
- 1996/97: Queensland

Career statistics
Competition	WLA
Matches	3
Runs scored	5
Batting average	5.00
100s/50s	0/0
Top score	5*
Catches/stumpings	0/–
- Source: CricketArchive, 30 June 2021

Kylie Peters (born c. 1975) is an Australian former cricketer. She played three List A matches for Queensland during the 1996–97 season of the Women's National Cricket League (WNCL). She was also active in international indoor cricket. Hailing from Mackay, Queensland, Peters is a schoolteacher outside of cricket.
