= Kylie Watson (British Army soldier) =

Northern Irish army medic

- Born: Ballymena, County Antrim, Northern Ireland
- Military career
- Allegiance: United Kingdom
- Branch: British Army
- Service years: 2006–present
- Rank: Warrant Officer Class 2
- Service number: Q1060658
- Unit: Royal Army Medical Corps
- Conflicts: Iraq War; War in Afghanistan
- Awards: Military Cross

Kylie Elizabeth Watson, MC is a British Army medic from Northern Ireland. She was awarded the Military Cross on 25 March 2011 in recognition of gallantry in Afghanistan.

== Military career ==
Watson joined the British Army in 2006 and, after basic training and studying battlefield medicine, she joined the Royal Army Medical Corps in September 2007. After her first six-month tour of duty in Basra, Iraq in 2008, she returned to the United Kingdom and qualified as a Class One medic.

In 2010, Watson was on her first tour as a fully qualified battlefield medic, serving alongside 9 Platoon, C Company, 1st Battalion, the Duke of Lancaster's Regiment, based mostly at Checkpoint Azadie in Helmand Province, Afghanistan. While out on patrol Watson undertook the actions for which she was awarded the Military Cross. An Afghan National Army (ANA) soldier, about 70 metres (230 ft) ahead of Watson, received two bullet wounds in the pelvis. The soldier, who was in shock, was being tended by a sniper. Watson ran forward under heavy fire to take over but his Afghan comrades tried to stop her because they did not want a woman to treat him. She managed to stem the bleeding and splinted his pelvis. He was then evacuated by Chinook to hospital at Camp Bastion.

On another patrol, Watson put herself in "mortal danger" to attend to a wounded Afghan soldier while under heavy Taliban fire. Another ANA soldier was hit in the chest and had stopped breathing. Watson tried to resuscitate him for 20 minutes but was unable to do so.

The citation for Watson's Military Cross read:

Watson's immense courage, willingness to put her own life at risk and absolute bravery saved the life of one warrior and acted as an inspiration to her platoon and their Afghan National Army partners.

The Military Cross is the third highest award for gallantry in the United Kingdom.

As of 2026, Watson continues to serve in the British Army. In August 2026 Watson, now a WO2 RQMS had a training company at the Pirbright Army Training Centre named after her in recognition of her inspirational bravery.

=== Awards ===

| Military Cross (MC) | (2011) |
| Iraq Medal | |
| OSM Afghanistan | with AFGHANISTAN clasp |

== Personal life ==
Watson was born in Ballymena, County Antrim, Northern Ireland, and is one of five children.
