= Kylie Percival =

Australian archivist

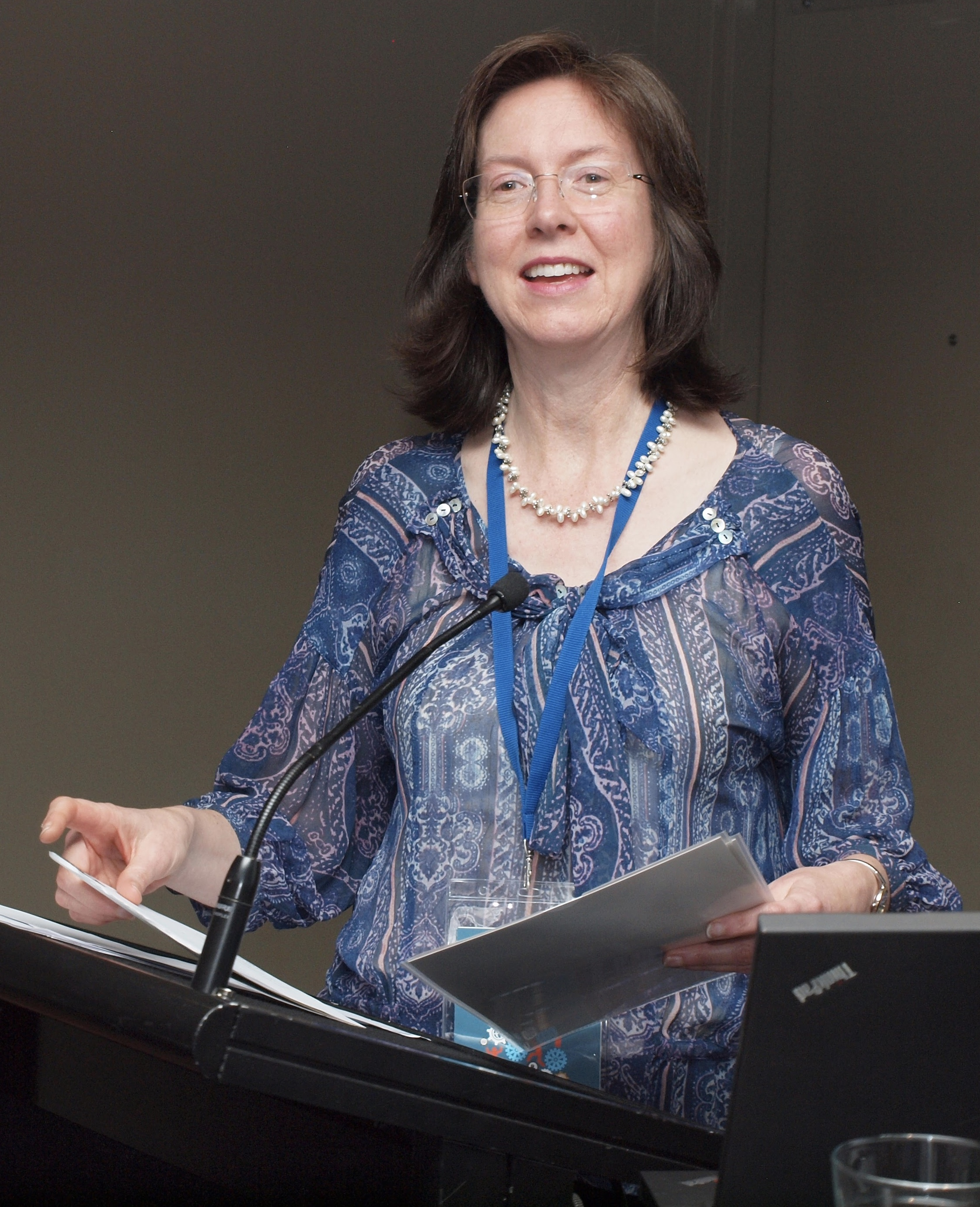
- Known for: Former president of the Australian Society of Archivists

Kylie Percival is an Australian archivist. She is University Librarian of Curtin University, having previously served as Associate University Librarian (Academic Engagement) at University of Adelaide. In addition, she is a former president of the Australian Society of Archivists.

== Career ==
After graduating from University, Percival was hired as an archivist in government, school and private company archives. In 1988, she joined the Australian Society of Archivists (ASA), and worked in various roles such as past conference organiser and Convenor of the South Australian Branch. As Convenor of the South Australian Branch, Percival helped fight against the closure of archives in Darwin, Adelaide and Hobart. By 1994, Percival began her archiving career at the University of Adelaide Archives.

In 2011, Percival became Vice-President of the ASA National Council, where she was subsequently elected President the following year. She held the role of president until 2016, where she was then presented with the Distinguished Achievement Award by the ASA. Two years later, Percival was appointed Associate University Librarian of Academic Engagement at the University of Adelaide, where she remained for six years. In late 2022, she relocated to Perth to commence her role as University Librarian at Curtin University.
