= Angie Scarth-Johnson =

Australian rock climber (born 2004)

Personal information
- Born: 20 May 2004 (age 22) Canberra, ACT, Australia

Climbing career
- Type of climber: Sport climbing
- Known for: Youngest climber to ascend 5.14b (8c) (aged 10)

Angelina Scarth-Johnson is an Australian rock climber. When she was nine years old, she became the youngest person to climb grade 5.13d (8b) .

== Career ==
Scarth-Johnson was born in Canberra, Australia, on 20 May 2004. She has Spanish heritage from her mother's side.

Scarth-Johnson began climbing at seven years old, after she fell out of a tree and her father took her to the local climbing gym to climb in safer conditions. At age nine, she broke the world record as the youngest person to climb grade 5.13d (8b) (Swingline, Red River Gorge, USA).

She was youngest person to ascend grade 5.14b (8c) when she topped Welcome to Tijuana, Rodellar, Spain, at the age of 10.

In 2022, Scarth-Johnson became the first Australian female climber to climb 5.14d (9a) after her ascent of Victimes Del Futur and completed the first female ascent of Victimas Perez 5.14d (9a).

A film, Momentum, following her progress as a climber, was released in 2023.

== Notable ascents ==
Grade 5.14d (9a)

- Victimes del Futur, Margalef, Spain - September 2021 (aged 17) (Note: The grade for Victimes del Futur has changed multiple times. It currently assigned an in-between grade 8c+ (5.14c)/9a (5.14d))
- Victimas Perez, Margalef, Spain - June 2022. First female ascent (aged 18)
- Pornographie, Ceuse, France - 2022

Grade 5.14c (8c+)

- Lucifer, Red River Gorge, USA - 2017 (aged 12)

Grade 5.14b (8c)

- Welcome to Tijuana, Rodellar, Spain - Youngest person to send this grade (aged 10)
- L'Espiadimonis, Margalef, Spain

Grade 5.14a (8b+)

- God's Own Stone, Red River Gorge, USA
- Speed Baby, Margalef, Spain

Grade 5.13d (8b)

- Swingline, Red River Gorge, USA - 2013 (aged 9) Youngest person to send this grade

== Filmography ==
- The North Face Presents: Pacific Lines (2019)
- Red Bull Dual Ascent (2022)
- Momentum: Angie Scarth-Johnson (2023)
- Reel Rock S10 E1: Yeah Buddy (2024)
