= Kayla (name) =

- Gender: Female

Other names
- Popularity: see popular names

Kayla is a recently created English feminine given name combining the name elements Kay and -la. Its use has been influenced by similar-sounding names such as Kaylee. Use of the name increased in the 1980s after the name was used for the character Kayla Brady on the American soap opera Days of Our Lives.

Notable people with the name include:

- Ryan Ackroyd, a British computer hacker who posed as a female known as Kayla
- Kayla Adamek (born 1995), Polish footballer
- Kayla Alexander (born 1991), Canadian professional basketball
- Kayla Ard (born 1984), American college basketball coach
- Kayla Bamwarth (born 1989), American volleyball player and coach
- Kayla Barron (born 1987), American submarine warfare officer, engineer, and astronaut
- Kayla Bashore Smedley (born 1983), American field hockey player
- Kayla Blake (born 1963), an American actress
- Kayla Braxton (born 1991), American sports broadcaster
- Kayla Bell (born 1996), British wheelchair basketball player
- Kayla Canett (born 1998), American rugby union player
- Kayla Clarke (born 1991), Australian swimmer
- Kayla Cromer (born 1998), American actress
- Kayla Cross (born 2005), Canadian tennis player
- Kayla Cullen (born 1992), New Zealand netball player
- Kayla Day (born 1999), American professional tennis player
- Kayla DiCello (born 2004), American gymnast
- Kayla Ewell (born 1985), American actress
- Kayla Fischer (born 2000), American professional soccer player
- Kayla Grey (born 1993), Canadian television sportscaster
- Kayla Harrison (born 1990), American judoka
- Kayla Hoffman (born 1988), American artistic gymnast
- Kayla Itsines (born 1991), American author, entrepreneur, and personal trainer
- Kayla Kessinger (born 1993), American politician from West Virginia
- Kayla Kent, American Guitarist and YouTuber.
- Kayla Laserson, American epidemiologist
- Kayla Maisonet (born 1999), American actress and influencer
- Kayla Martell (born 1989), American beauty queen
- Kayla McAlister (born 1988), New Zealand netball player
- Kayla McBride (born 1992), American professional basketball player
- Kayla Mendoza (born 1992), American serving 24 years in prison after being charged with vehicular homicide
- Kayla Miracle (born 1996), American wrestler
- Kayla Moore (born 1961), American president of Foundation for Moral Law
- Kayla Morrison (born 1996), American-Australian footballer
- Kayla Mueller (1988–2015), American human rights activist
- Kayla Parker (1971–2007), American musician
- Kayla Pedersen (born 1989), American basketball player
- Kayla Reeves (born 1992), American musician
- Kayla Rolland (1993–2000), American child shot and killed by another child
- Kayla Sanchez (born 2001), Filipino-Canadian swimmer
- Kayla Sharland (born 1985), New Zealand field hockey player
- Kayla Sims (born 1999), American YouTuber
- Kayla Standish (born 1989), American basketball player
- Kayla Stra (born 1984), Australian jockey
- Kayla Swarts (born 2003), South African field hockey player
- Kayla Tausche (born 1986), American broadcast journalist
- Kayla Thornton (born 1992), American basketball player
- Kayla Vespa (born 1997), Canadian ice hockey player
- Kayla White (born 1996), American track and field athlete
- Kayla Whitelock (born 1985), New Zealand field hockey player
- Kayla Williams (author) (born 1976), American writer
- Kayla Williams (gymnast) (born 1993), American artistic gymnast
- Kayla Young (born 1988), American politician

== Fictional characters ==
- Kayla Azfal, character from Ackley Bridge
- Kayla Booth, character from Home and Away
- Kayla Brady, Days of Our Lives character
- Kayla Butts, from Margaret Peterson Haddix's Summer of Broken Rules
- Kayla Day, from Eighth Grade
- Kayla Forester, from Tom and Jerry.
- Kayla Knowles, a daughter of Apollo from Rick Riordan's The Trials of Apollo.
- Kayla Morgan, from Cloud 9
- Kayla Silverfox, Marvel supervillain
- Kayla, the sister of Lee (Timothée Chalamet) from Luca Guadagnino's Bones and All.
- Kayla, a kangaroo and Zill's girlfriend in the webcomic ZooPhobia.
- Kayla, the alias used by Amy Lau, a character in the Netflix series Beef
- Bio-Mech Kayla, the alias used by Mikayla "Kayla" Maciel, a character created by Canadian YouTuber PopCross Studios.

== See also ==
- Cayla (disambiguation)
- Kalla (name)
- Kyla (given name)
- McKayla Maroney – American artistic gymnast (born 1995)
