= Kylie Halliday =

Australian aerobic gymnast

- Born: 1981 (age 44–45)

Gymnastics career
- Discipline: Aerobic gymnastics
- Country represented: Australia

Kylie Halliday (born c. 1981) is one of Australia's and the world's top sports aerobics athletes. Ranked number 1 in South Australia for 5 years from 2000 to 2004, she was Australian ranked number 1 in 2003 and 2004 and world ranked number 2 in 2004.

Kylie's home town of Adelaide, South Australia hosted the FISAF World Championships in 2004 where Kylie placed 2nd to Finland's Tiia Piili.
