= Damian Keeley =

English footballer

Personal information
- Full name: Damian Keeley
- Date of birth: 14 February 1963 (age 63)
- Place of birth: Salford, England
- Position: Forward

Senior career*
Years	Team	Apps	(Gls)
1981–1982	Torquay United	3	(0)
1982–19??	Teignmouth		
- * Club domestic league appearances and goals

Damian Keeley (born 14 February 1963) is an English former professional footballer, born in Salford, who played in the Football League for Torquay United.

Keeley, a forward, joined Frank O'Farrell's Torquay United in September 1981, making his debut, as a substitute for Willie Young, on 27 March 1982 in a 2–1 home win against Rochdale. With Torquay in a mid-table position with nothing to play for, Keeley made a further appearance as a substitute (this time replacing Martin Musgrove) in the penultimate game of the season (a 2–0 defeat away to Port Vale) and started the final game of the season, a 1–1 draw away to Darlington.

He was released at the end of the season, joining non-league club Teignmouth.
