= Keely Cat-Wells =

British disability rights activist

Keely Cat-Wells (born 1996 or 1997) is a British entrepreneur, disability rights advocate, and writer. She is the founder of C Talent, a talent agency focused on representing disabled actors, for which she was honored as part of Forbes 30 Under 30 North America in 2021.

Cat-Wells is a contributor to Forbes.

== Early life and education ==
Cat-Wells grew up on a farm in West Sussex, England. As a child, she struggled in school; she was diagnosed with dyslexia at age 8. She enjoyed dance and acting, and first planned to become a professional dancer and actor. However, at age 17, six months after beginning school at a performing arts college, she became ill and needed to be hospitalized. After initial struggles for a diagnosis and multiple surgeries on her colon, in 2016 she underwent an ileostomy. She was also later diagnosed with PTSD from her experiences with chronic illness.

== Career ==
Cat-Wells began working at a London-based talent agency while recovering from her ileostomy, first as an intern and then as the head of children's talent.

In 2017, Cat-Wells visited Los Angeles to audition for a film. She was offered the role, which was later rescinded following a fitting where a bikini revealed her ileostomy bag. She relocated to Los Angeles in 2018, where she became involved with the disabled acting community and decided to found C Talent, a talent agency focused on representing disabled actors, writers, and producers. The company was acquired by Whalar in 2022, at which point it represented 85 disabled creators. Cat-Wells remained involved as the president of Whalar's C Talent division.

In the early 2020s, Cat-Wells began working on Zetta Studios, a UK-based film studio that aims to be fully accessible.

In December 2021, Cat-Wells was a speaker at the International Paralympic Committee's 2021 Inclusion Summit.

In early 2022, Cat-Wells participated in the first Mental Health Youth Action Forum at the White House.

She later co-founded Making Space Media with Sophie Morgan.

== Awards and recognition ==
Cat-Wells is a member of the Shaw Trust Disability Power 100.

In 2020, Cat-Wells was named one of Aerie's #AerieReal Changemakers.

In 2021, Cat-Wells was a Diana Award recipient and a member of Forbes 30 Under 30 North America.

Cat-Wells was one of six young activists honored at the 2022 Young Activists Summit. That same year, she was also one of five entrepreneurs honored as part of the One Young World Entrepreneur of the Year Award.
