= Kayla Kent =

American guitarist

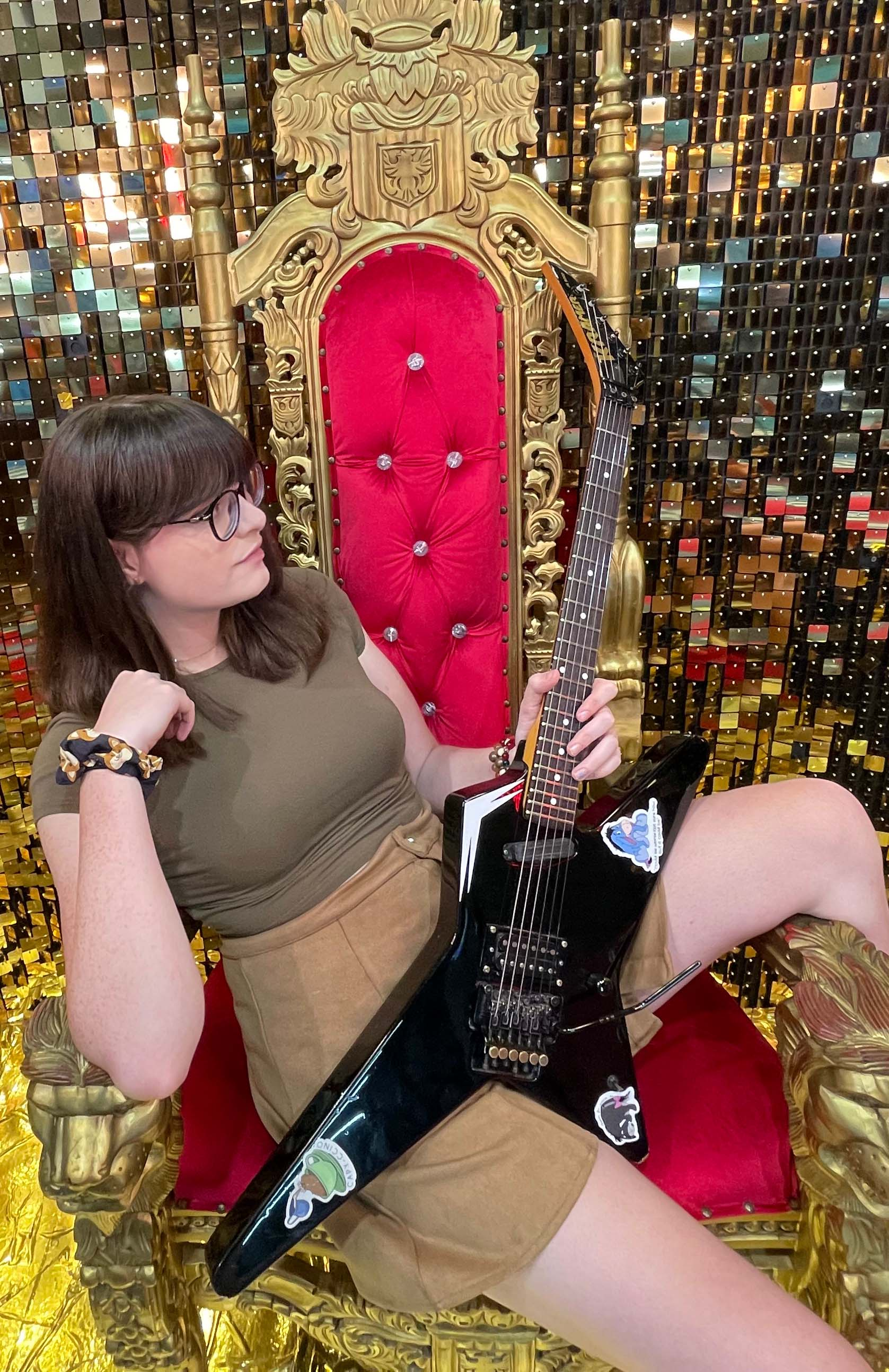
- Kayla in 2022

Background information
- Genres: groove metal, thrash metal
- Occupations: Musician, songwriter, YouTuber
- Instruments: Guitar, bass
- Years active: 2020–present
- Website: kaylakent.com

Kayla Kent is an American guitarist and YouTuber known for her covers of Dimebag Darrell guitar solos. She first came to wider attention after being featured in Guitar World in early 2022, and is predominantly associated with her Kramer JK8000 and Kapybara model guitars.

Following her rise in popularity, she was revealed to have been considered as a potential replacement guitarist for Pantera following the death of Dimebag Darrell, with Phil Anselmo disclosing this to her at a Pantera concert in Austin, TX in 2023.

Kent maintains a YouTube channel under her own name, where she began posting videos in late 2020.

== Influences ==
While Kent is well known to accredit Dimebag Darrell as her single biggest guitar influence, she lists Ty Tabor, Joe Satriani, and Alex Lifeson as her biggest secondary influences.

She is known to cover a select few other guitar players on her channel other than Dimebag Darrell - such as leads from Eddie Van Halen and Jake E Lee.

== Discography ==
Even though Kent is known for her Heavy Metal playing style, she has released several singles under her own name which she described as "more indie rock than metal" to Guitar World.

Year	Band	Title	Notes
2019	Kayla Kent	Silly Insults	Single
2019	Kayla Kent	All For Nothing	Single
2021	Kayla Kent	a (cute) stress disorder	Single
2021	Kayla Kent	cauliflower crust	Single
2021	Kayla Kent	Halloween	Single
2021	Kayla Kent	Fractured Soul	Single
2021	Kayla Kent	How Nice	Single
2022	Kayla Kent	Chaos Reigns	Single
2023	Otu	Believe (In the style of Pantera) (feat. Kayla Kent)	Otu album featuring her solo on this track.
2025	Kayla Kent	Smoke This	Single
2025	Kayla Kent	Lost and Found	Single

== Gear ==
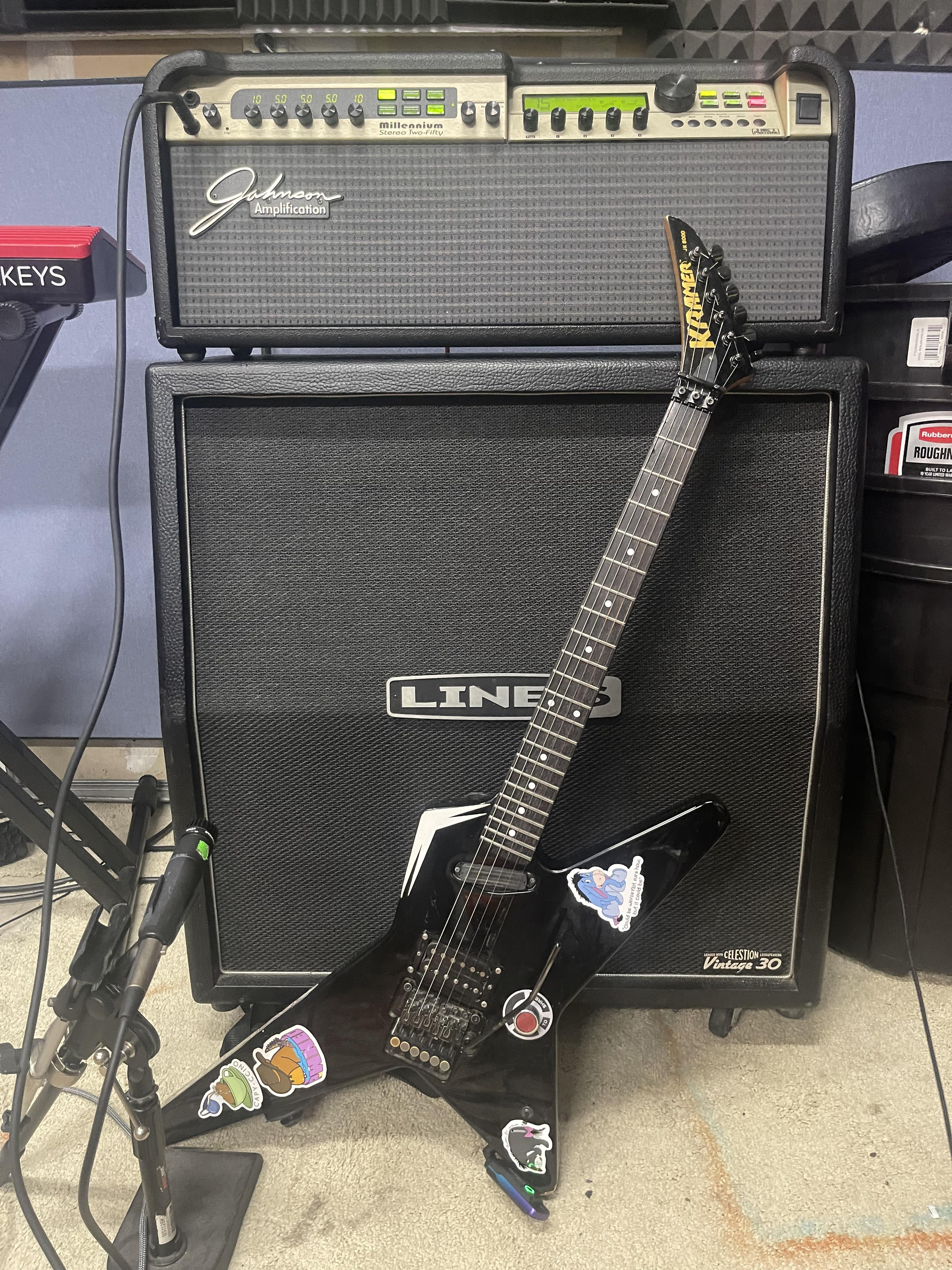
Kayla Kent's JK8000 and Johnson Millenium Stereo 250

Kent is only known to play her Kramer JK8000, as it is the only Kramer Guitars model that has ever been officially made with a star body and a reverse hockey stick headstock. She has gone on record of turning down several other guitar manufacturers that offered her free guitars and exclusivity clauses, in order to keep playing her JK8000.

After explaining this to a forum dedicated to Kramer Guitars, the forum collectively decided to build her a backup guitar identical to her JK8000. She named the guitar the Kramer Kapybara.

Kent has only ever been seen using a Johnson Millenium amplifier. She credits receiving a USB audio interface for Christmas 2019 from her father for enabling her to practice more and learn Dimebag Darrell solos.

== New Band ==
In February of 2025, Kent released a video on her YouTube channel featuring a demo she had recorded with her band. The demo was entitled "Big Groovy". Guitar World reported her intent behind releasing the demo prematurely without vocals was to seek a singer.

The Demo was met with favorable reception, with Guitar World stating:

"It sounds like an unreleased cut from Reinventing The Steel [Pantera], full of sleek turns, chunky power chord riffs, and squealing licks." - Phil Weller Guitar World, February 2025

Kent stated that she was looking for an aggressive male vocalist who "fits the same vibe that we do". While also stating that she isn't looking to tour right away with only gigs here and there.
