= Cayla =

Cayla may refer to:

== First name ==
- Cayla Barnes (born 1999), American ice hockey player
- Cayla George (born 1989), Australian professional basketball player
- Cayla Kluver, American author

== Other uses ==
- Cayla (grape)
- My Friend Cayla, children's doll
- Zoé Talon, comtesse du Cayla

== See also ==
- Kayla (disambiguation)
