= Kylie Speer =

Australian television presenter, actor, photographer and author

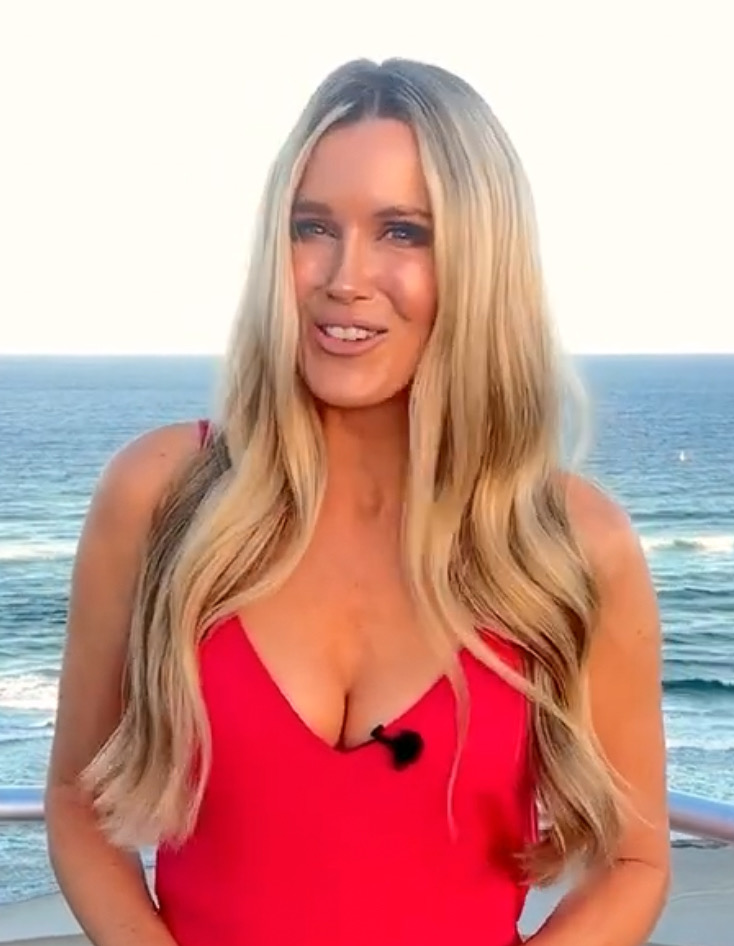
- Speer in 2026
- Education: Queensland University of Technology (Bachelor Degree)
- Occupations: Television presenter; actor

Kylie Speer is an Australian television presenter, actor, photographer and author. She is known for her work in television hosting and on-camera presenting in Australia and the United States.

== Career ==
Speer began her career in music journalism and television presenting. She was a music journalist for The Sunday Telegraph, and subsequently worked across a range of television and digital media roles in Australia. She hosted both the BigPond Movies and BigPond Music channels in Australia (2010–2013), as well as TheFIX on Ninemsn (2009–2012) where she worked as host on MusicFIX TV and the SummerFIX TV series.

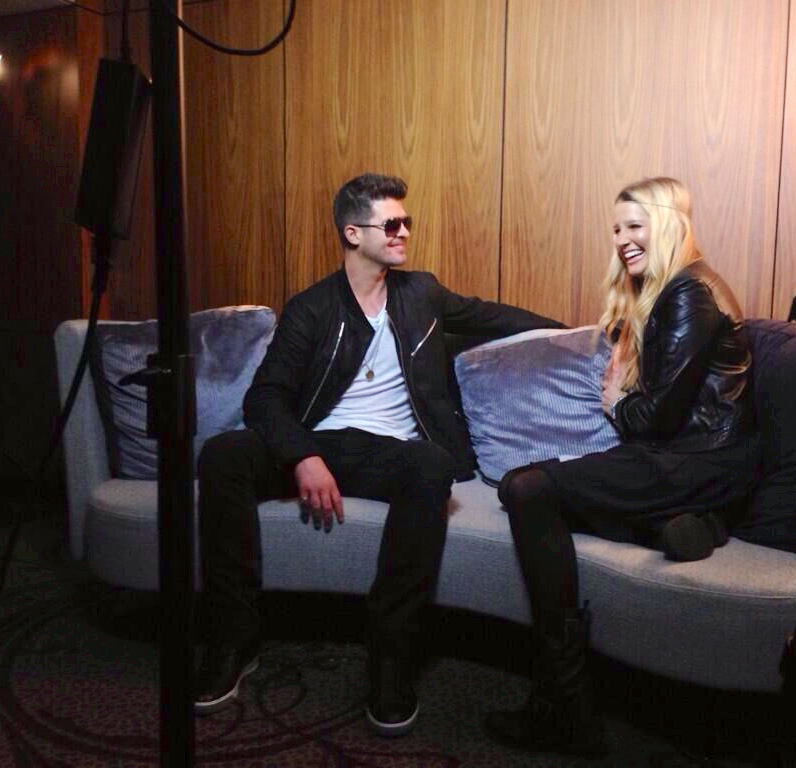
Speer interviewing Robin Thicke in 2013

Speer later served as the United States entertainment correspondent for the Nine Network's live morning television program Today Extra (2013–2016), broadcast nationally in Australia, and as the Los Angeles-based film correspondent for BigPond Movies (2013–2017).

In addition to her presenting work, Speer hosted red carpet and entertainment broadcasts including coverage of the annual Australian television industry awards, the TV Week Logie Awards, and Foxtel's ASTRA Awards national red carpet broadcast.. She also served as host of Hamilton Island Race Week TV (2010–2016) and emceed the Australian Defence Force (ADF) Forces Entertainment Tour to the Sinai Desert in Egypt.

In the 2020s, Speer expanded her work as a television host and presenter. Since 2023, she has hosted the World Dog Surfing Championships Best Waves television specials.

Speer is a photographer. Speer also contributed editorial and photographic work to Australians in Film, a Los Angeles-based non-profit organisation supporting Australian screen industry professionals working in the United States. Australians in Film credited Speer with editing and creative direction for Charlie's magazine and with producing editions of the organisation's Aura publication.

Alongside her presenting and media work, Speer has pursued acting projects in Australia and the United States. Her screen work has included independent film, television and digital productions. Speer wrote the 2025 book The Book of Revolution.
