= Kayla =

Kayla may refer to:

- Kayla (name), a feminine given name (and list of people with the name)

== Ethiopia ==
- Kayla (Beta Israel), a Beta Israel community
- Kayla dialect, an Agaw language of Beta Israel

== India ==
- Kayla River, a river in the state of Gujarat
- Kayla, Bhiwani, a village in Haryana state

== Myanmar ==
- Kayla, Myanmar

== Songs ==
- "Kayla", a song by Stephen Sanchez from What Was, Not Now, 2021

== See also ==
- Cayla (disambiguation)
- Kalla (disambiguation)
