= Kylie Dowling =

Australian Polocrosse rider

Kylie Dowling (born 1974) is an Australian Polocrosse rider. Dowling competed for many years, and retired in 2008. She rode in Australia's winning team 2007 in the United Kingdom at the Polocrosse World Cup. In 2008, Dowling also won Best Number 1 Women's Rider at the Polocrosse Nationals in Perth. Dowling's most successful horse was Kebarinup Lisa.

She was born in Western Australia.

== Career ==
- 2001 Great Southern Zone Polocrosse Women's Winner
- 2001 great southern zone Polocrosse Women's R/U in Australian champs.
- 2000 WA Women's Polocrosse Naracoorte.
- 1999 WA Vs Zimbabwe mixed Polocrosse.
- 1998 WA Women's Polocrosse
- Won Aust Zone Championships.

== See also ==
- Women's sport in Australia
