= Kiley =

Kiley may refer to:

== Given name ==
- Kiley Boynton, American acrobatic gymnast
- Kiley Dean (born 1982), American contemporary R&B singer
- Kiley Gaffney, Australian musician and performance artist
- Kiley May (born 1986/1987), actor, filmmaker, and two-spirit activist

== Surname ==
- Bob Kiley (1935–2016), public transit planner and supervisor
- Deborah Scaling Kiley (1958–2012), American sailor, author, motivational speaker, and businesswoman
- Dan Kiley (1912–2004), American landscape architect in the modernist style
- James Kiley (1865–1953), British businessman and Liberal Party politician, MP from 1916 to 1922
- John Kiley (1912–1993), organist at Fenway Park from 1953 to 1989 and at the Boston Garden from 1941 to 1984
- John Kiley (baseball) (1859–1940), Major League Baseball outfielder and pitcher
- Kevin C. Kiley (born 1950), Surgeon General of the United States Army, commander of the U.S. Army Medical Command
- Kevin Kiley (sportscaster), American sportscaster and talk show host
- Kevin Kiley (wrestler) (born 1981), American professional wrestler (ring name Alex Riley)
- Kevin Kiley (politician), born 1985, California Assemblyman and gubernatorial candidate
- Moses E. Kiley (1876–1953), Canadian-born prelate of the Roman Catholic Church
- Nathan Kiley (born 1981), English stage actor
- Richard Kiley (1922–1999), American stage, television, and film actor
- Roger Kiley (1900–1974), United States federal judge
- Sam Kiley (born 1964), Defence and Security Editor of Sky News
- Tony Kiley, drummer in The Blow Monkeys, an alternative rock band

== Fictional characters ==
- Kiley, a fictional character in the television series My Life with the Walter Boys
- Okayasu Kiley, in the English-language version of the manga Peach Girl

== See also ==
- Kailey, a surname and feminine given name
- Keighley (disambiguation)
- Kylee (born 1994), Japanese singer
- Kylie (disambiguation)
- Kyly Clarke (AKA Kyly, born 1981) Australian former model
- Rilo Kiley, American indie rock band formed in Los Angeles, active from 1998 to 2013
