= Samuel Keeley (footballer) =

Scottish footballer

Personal information
- Full name: Samuel Keeley
- Date of birth: 1874
- Place of birth: Scotland
- Position: Centre forward

Senior career*
Years	Team	Apps	(Gls)
1897	Everton	1	(0)
1897–1898	Dundee		
Total		1	(0)
- * Club domestic league appearances and goals

Samuel Keeley (1874–unknown) was a Scottish footballer who played in the Football League for Everton. Keeley's only appearance for Everton came in a 2–0 defeat away at Stoke on 9 April 1898.
