= Kyle (given name) =

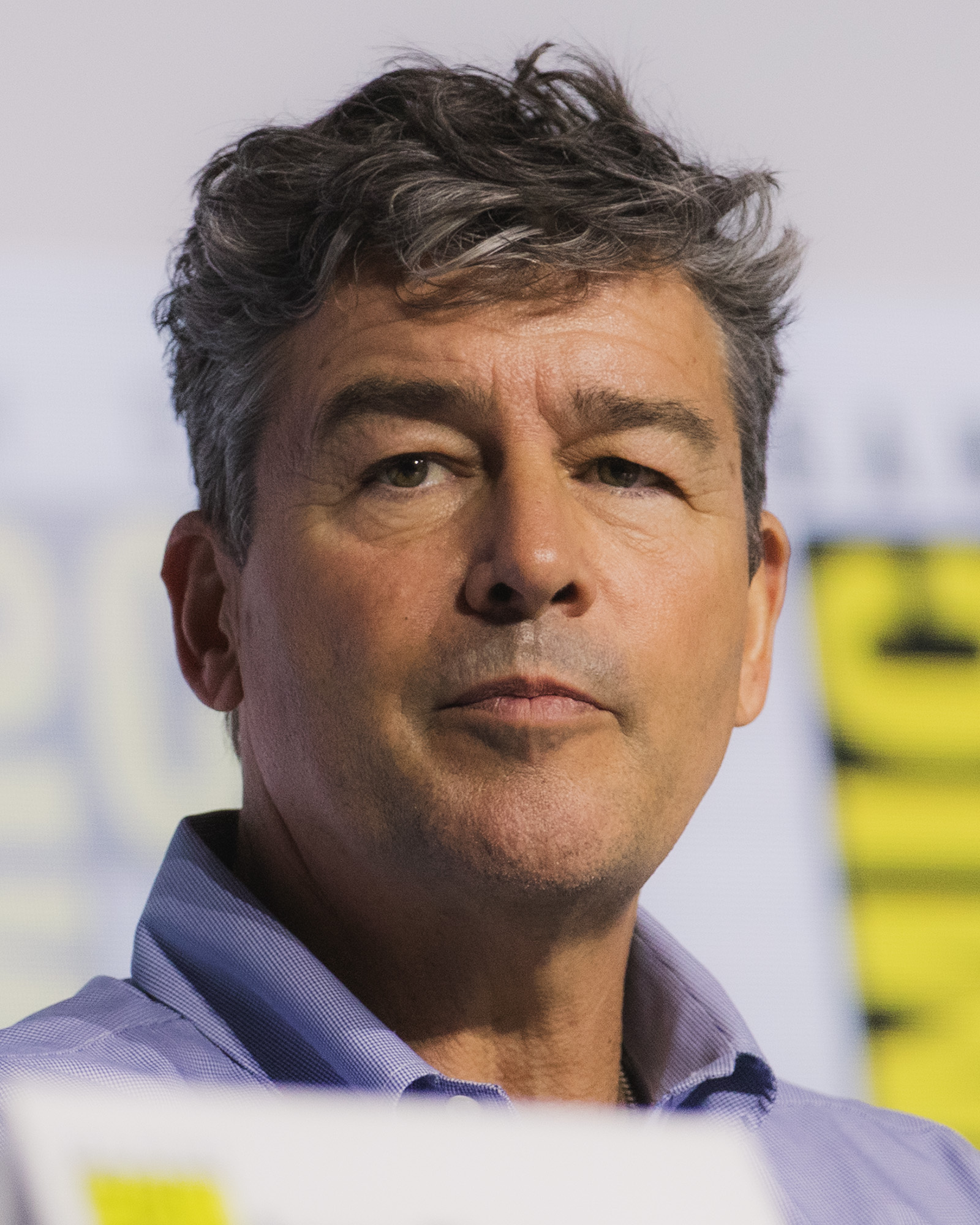
- Kyle Chandler in 2026
- Pronunciation: /ˈkaɪlˌˈkaɪəl/
- Gender: Unisex (mostly male)
- Language: English

Origin
- Languages: 1. Scottish Gaelic; 2. English
- Origin: From the surname or place names
- Derivation: Gaelic: caol
- Meaning: "narrow strait"
- Region of origin: Scotland

Other names
- Related names: Kylie; Kylah; Kyla

Kyle is a unisex English-language given name. It is a transferred use of the Scottish surname Kyle or of place names such as Kyle, Ayrshire on the southwest coast of Scotland. Kyle is also a Scots word for a strait, derived from the Gaelic caol ("narrow").

== History of usage ==
Kyle is predominantly masculine and has been in use as a given name at least since the 1800s. It has been among the top 1,000 names for American boys at various times since 1902, influenced by American football player Kyle Rote (1928–2002) and his son, soccer star Kyle Rote Jr. (born 1950), and later by the character Kyle Hadley played by Robert Stack in the 1956 film Written on the Wind and the character Kyle Reese played by Michael Biehn in the 1984 film The Terminator. The name peaked in usage for American boys in 1990, when it was in 18th place on the popularity chart.

Kyle also has a history of use as a name for women, with American model and game show panelist "Miss Television" Kyle MacDonnell (1922–2004) being a prominent example; she was at the height of her fame in the late 1940s and early 1950s. The name Kyle first appeared among the top 1,000 names for American girls in 1950 and peaked in usage in 1951, when it ranked 594th on the chart. It remained among the top 1,000 names for girls in the United States until 1990. The similar feminine names Kyla and Kylie, which can both also be derived from unrelated sources, are often grouped as variants of Kyle. These feminine names then became more popular than Kyle for girls.

The name has also been well used for boys in Australia, Canada, Ireland, New Zealand and the United Kingdom.

== Men ==
=== A–C ===
- Kyle (musician) (born 1993), American rapper, singer, songwriter, and actor
- Kyle Abbott (disambiguation), multiple people
- Kyle Abeysinghe (born 2000), Sri Lankan swimmer
- Kyle Abraham (born 1977), American choreographer
- Kyle Adams (born 1988), American football tight end
- Kyle Adnam (born 1993), Australian basketball player
- Kyle Alcorn (born 1985), American track and field athlete
- Kyle Alessandro (born 2006), Norwegian singer
- Kyle Alexander (born 1996), Canadian basketball player for Hapoel Tel Aviv of the Israeli Basketball Premier League
- Kyle Allen (born 1996), American football quarterback
- Kyle Allison (born 1990), Scottish professional goalkeeper
- Kyle Altman (born 1986), American soccer player
- Kyle Amendt (born 2000), American baseball player
- Kyle Amor (born 1987), English professional rugby league footballer
- Kyle Alandy Amor, American visual artist, commercial model, singer, and actor of Filipino descent
- Kyle Anderson (disambiguation), multiple people
- Kyle Andrews (born 1982), American songwriter and performer
- Kyle Arrington (born 1986), American football cornerback
- Kyle Asante (born 1991), English footballer
- Kyle Austin (born 1988), American professional basketball player
- Kyle Bagwell (born 1961), American economics professor
- Kyle Baker (born 1965), American writer and illustrator of comic books
- Kyle Balda (born 1971), American animator and film director
- Kyle Baldock (born 1991), Australian BMX rider
- Kyle Barker (born 2000), English footballer
- Kyle Barone (born 1989), American basketball player
- Kyle Barraclough (born 1990), American baseball player
- Kyle Bartsch (born 1991), American baseball player
- Kyle Bartley (born 1991), English footballer
- Kyle Basler (born 1982), American football punter
- Kyle Bass (born 1969), founder and principal of Hayman Capital Management, L.P.
- Kyle Baun (born 1992), Canadian ice hockey player
- Kyle Beach (born 1990), Canadian professional ice hockey player
- Kyle Beckerman (born 1982), American soccer player
- Kyle Bekker (born 1990), Canadian soccer player
- Kyle Bell (born 1985), American football fullback
- Kyle Benedictus (born 1991), Scottish footballer
- Kyle Bennett (disambiguation), multiple people
- Kyle Berkshire (born 1996), American racing driver
- Kyle Bibb (born 1987), English rugby league footballer
- Kyle Biggar (born 1986), Canadian professor
- Kyle Bird (born 1993), American baseball player
- Kyle Blanks (born 1986), American professional baseball outfielder and first baseman
- Kyle Bochniak (born 1987), American mixed martial artist
- Kyle Boddy (born 1983), American baseball trainer
- Kyle Boller (born 1981), American football quarterback
- Kyle Bornheimer (born 1975), American actor
- Kyle Bosworth (born 1986), American football outside linebacker
- Kyle Bradish (born 1996), American baseball player
- Kyle Brady (born 1972), professional American football player
- Kyle Brandt (born 1979), American actor and TV presenter
- Kyle Bridgwood (born 1989), South African born Australian cyclist
- Kyle Briggs (born 1987), English rugby league player
- Kyle Brindza (born 1993), American football player
- Kyle Brnovich (born 1997), American baseball player
- Kyle Brodziak (born 1984), Canadian ice hockey player
- Kyle Brown (disambiguation), multiple people
- Kyle Bruckmann (born 1971), American composer and oboist
- Kyle Burkhart (born 1986), American football tackle
- Kyle Burroughs (born 1995), Canadian ice hockey player
- Kyle Busch (1985–2026), American NASCAR racer
- Kyle Calder (born 1979), Canadian ice hockey player
- Kyle Calloway (1987–2016), American football offensive tackle
- Kyle Cameron (born 1997), English professional footballer
- Kyle Carlson (born 1978), American fashion model, twin brother of Lane Carlson
- Kyle Carpenter (born 1989), United States Marine Corps Corporal
- Kyle Carter (born 1992), American football tight end
- Kyle Cassidy (born 1966), American photographer
- Kyle Cave, professor of psychology at UMass Amherst
- Kyle Cease (born 1977), American actor, comedian, and motivational speaker
- Kyle Cerminara (born 1983), American Olympic wrestler
- Kyle Chalmers (born 1998), Australian swimmer
- Kyle Chandler (born 1965), American actor
- Kyle Chapman (disambiguation), multiple people
- Kyle Chen (born 2000), New Zealand boxer
- Kyle Cheney (disambiguation), multiple people
- Kyle Chipchura (born 1986), Canadian professional ice hockey centre
- Kyle Christy (born 1992), American football player
- Kyle Clement (born 1985), American football defensive tackle
- Kyle Clemons (born 1990), American track and field sprinter
- Kyle Clifford (born 1991), Canadian ice hockey winger
- Kyle Clifton (born 1962), American football linebacker
- Kyle Coetzer (born 1985), Scottish cricketer
- Kyle Coney (born 1990), Irish Gaelic footballer
- Kyle Cook (born 1975), member of rock band Matchbox Twenty
- Kyle Connor (born 1996), American ice hockey player
- Kyle Cooper (born 1962), designer of motion picture title sequences
- Kyle Corning (1889–1970), pseudonym of American lawyer and author Erle Stanley Gardner
- Kyle Cranmer (born 1977), American physicist and a professor at New York University
- Kyle Creed (1912–1982), American musician and banjo luthier of 20th-century Appalachia
- Kyle Crick (born 1992), American professional baseball pitcher
- Kyle Critchell (born 1987), English footballer
- Kyle Crutchmer (born 1993), American professional mixed martial artist
- Kyle Culbertson (born 1992), American soccer player
- Kyle Cumiskey (born 1986), Canadian ice hockey defenceman
- Kyle Curinga (born 1993), American soccer player

=== D–H ===
- Kyle Dake (born 1991), American wrestler
- Kyle Davis (disambiguation), multiple people
- Kyle Davies (disambiguation), multiple people
- Kyle De Silva (born 1993), English footballer
- Kyle De'Volle (born 1989), British fashion designer
- Kyle Denney (born 1977), Major League Baseball pitcher
- Kyle Dempsey (born 1995), English professional footballer
- Kyle DeVan (born 1985), American football guard
- Kyle Diamantas (born 1987), American attorney and government official
- Kyle DiFulvio (born 1975), American singer-songwriter and musician
- Kyle Dinkheller (died 1998), sheriff and murder victim
- Kyle Dixon (disambiguation), multiple people
- Kyle Dowdy (born 1993), American baseball player
- Kyle Downes (born 1983), Canadian-American actor
- Kyle Drabek (born 1987), American professional baseball pitcher
- Kyle Dubas (born 1985), Canadian ice hockey manager
- Kyle Dugger (born 1996), American football player
- Kyle Duncan (born 1997), American soccer player
- Kyle Bobby Dunn (born 1986), composer, arranger, and live performer of modern and neo-classical based drone music
- Kyle Dunkley (born 2000), Australian football player
- Kyle Dunnigan (born 1971), American comedian
- Kyle Eastmond (born 1989), English professional rugby union and former professional rugby league footballer
- Kyle Eastwood (born 1968), American jazz musician
- Kyle Echarri (born 2003), Filipino actor and singer
- Kyle Eckel (born 1981), American football fullback
- Kyle Edmund (born 1995), South African-born British tennis player
- Kyle Edwards (disambiguation), multiple people
- Kyle Efford (born 2003), American football player
- Kyle Egan (born 1998), English footballer
- Kyle Emanuel (born 1991), American football player
- Kyle Even (born 1985), American member of rock band Breathe Carolina
- Kyle Exume (born 1987), Canadian professional Canadian football running back
- Kyle Falconer (born 1987), Scottish musician
- Kyle Farmer (born 1990), American baseball player
- Kyle Farnsworth (born 1976), Major League Baseball pitcher
- Kyle Fawcett (born 1979), Canadian politician and current Member of the Legislative Assembly of Alberta
- Kyle Feldt (born 1992), Australian professional rugby league footballer
- Kyle Fiat (born 1983), American professional lacrosse player
- Kyle Filipowski (born 2003), American basketball player
- Kyle Finch (born 1998), English professional squash player
- Kyle Finn (born 1998), Irish football player
- Kyle Finnegan (born 1991), American baseball player
- Kyle Fisher (born 1994), American soccer player
- Kyle Flanagan (disambiguation), multiple people
- Kyle Flood (born 1971), American football head coach and former player
- Kyle Fogg (born 1990), American professional basketball player
- Kyle Foggo (born 1954), Republican and American government intelligence officer
- Kyle Fowler (born 1992), American stock car racing driver
- Kyle Fraser-Allen (born 1990), English football player
- Kyle Freadrich (born 1978), Canadian professional ice hockey player
- Kyle Freeland (born 1993), American baseball player
- Kyle Froman (born 1976), American dancer of the New York City Ballet
- Kyle Fuller (disambiguation), multiple people
- Kyle Funkhouser (born 1994), American professional baseball player
- Kyle Gallner (born 1986), American actor
- Kyle Gann (born 1955), American composer
- Kyle Garlick (born 1992), American baseball player
- Kyle Garrett (1956–2016), pseudonym of American comic book artist Gary Reed
- Kyle Gass (born 1960), American actor and musician
- Kyle Gibson (born 1987), American professional baseball pitcher
- Kyle Gibson (basketball) (born 1987), American basketball player for Hapoel Galil Elyon of the Israeli Basketball Premier League
- Kyle Gilmour (born 1988), Canadian rugby union flanker
- Kyle Godwin (born 1992), Australian rugby union footballer
- Kyle Goldwin (born 1985), Gibraltarian footballer
- Kyle Good (born 1991), Irish hockey player
- Kyle Gookins (born 1982), American soccer coach
- Kyle Gordon (born 1992), American comedian and musician
- Kyle Gourlay (born 1998), Scottish professional footballer
- Kyle Graham (1899–1973), Major League Baseball pitcher
- Kyle Graves (born 1989), Canadian soccer player
- Kyle Greentree (born 1983), Canadian professional ice hockey player
- Kyle Greig (born 1990), American soccer player
- Kyle Greaux (born 1988), Trinidad and Tobago sprinter
- Kyle Gupton (born 1990), American basketball player
- Kyle Gurrieri (born 1998), American soccer player
- Kyle Guy (born 1997), American basketball player
- Kyle Hagel (born 1985), Canadian professional ice hockey player
- Kyle Justin Hamm (born 1975), American rock musician
- Kyle Hardingham (born 1988), Australian rules footballer
- Kyle Harris (born 1986), American actor
- Kyle Harrison (baseball) (born 2001), American baseball pitcher for the San Francisco Giants
- Kyle Harrison (lacrosse) (born 1983), professional American lacrosse player
- Kyle Hartigan (born 1991), Australian professional football player
- Kyle Hartzell (born 1985), American lacrosse player
- Kyle D. Hawkins (born 1980), American Solicitor General of Texas
- Kyle Hawkins, American lacrosse head coach
- Kyle Haynes (born 1991), English footballer
- Kyle Hebert (born 1969), American voice actor and podcaster
- Kyle T. Heffner (born 1957), American television and film actor
- Kyle Helms (born 1986), Canadian professional ice hockey player
- Kyle Helton (born 1986), American soccer player
- Kyle Hendricks (born 1989), American baseball player
- Kyle Henry, American independent filmmaker
- Kyle Hergel (born 1999), Canadian football player
- Kyle Higashioka (born 1991), American baseball player
- Kyle Higgins (born 1985), American comic book writer and film director
- Kyle Hill (born 1979), American professional basketball player
- Kyle Hines (born 1986), American professional basketball player
- Kyle Hinton (born 1998), American football player
- Kyle Hodnett (born 1986), South African-born English cricketer
- Kyle Hodsoll (born 1988), Bermudian cricketer
- Kyle Hoffer (born 1989), American soccer player
- Kyle Hogg (born 1983), English cricketer
- Kyle Holder (born 1994), American professional baseball player
- Kyle Hollingsworth (born 1968), American rock keyboard player
- Kyle Horch (born 1964), American classical saxophonist
- Kyle Hosford (born 1989), Irish basketball player
- Kyle Hotz (born 1950), American comic book writer and artist
- Kyle Howard (born 1978), American actor
- Kyle Howarth (born 1994), British speedway rider
- Kyle Hudson (born 1987), American professional baseball outfielder
- Kyle Hope, Barbados cricketer and Shai Hope's brother
- Kyle Aaron Huff (1977–2006), Capitol Hill massacre mass murderer
- Kyle Hughes (born 1989), British motorcycle speedway rider
- Kyle Hunter (born 1973), Canadian badminton player
- Kyle Hutton (born 1991), Scottish association footballer

=== I–M ===
- Kyle Isbel (born 1997), American baseball player
- Kyle Israel (born 1985), American starting college football quarterback
- Kyle Jacobs (disambiguation), multiple people
- Kyle Jameson (born 1998), English professional footballer
- Kyle Jamieson (born 1994), New Zealand cricketer
- Kyle Janek (born 1958), Republican member of the Texas Senate
- Kyle Jarrow (born 1979), American writer and rock musician
- Kyle Jarvis (born 1989), Zimbabwean cricketer
- Kyle Jason (born 1972), American singer, songwriter, musician and performer
- Kyle Jean-Baptiste (1993–2015), American Broadway singer
- Kyle Jeffery, Canadian sprint canoer
- Kyle Jensen (born 1988), American baseball player
- Kyle Johansen (born 1967), Republican Majority Leader in the Alaska House of Representatives
- Kyle Johnson (disambiguation), multiple people
- Kyle Jones (disambiguation), multiple people
- Kyle Julius (born 1979), Canadian basketball player
- Kyle Justin (disambiguation), multiple people
- Kyle Juszczyk (born 1991), American football fullback
- Kyle Kacal (born 1969), Republican member of the Texas House of Representatives
- Kyle Kalis (born 1993), American football player
- Kyle Kaplan (born 1990), American actor
- Kyle Kashuv (born 2001), American conservative activist
- Kyle Kelley (born 1985), American sports car racing driver
- Kyle Kendrick (born 1984), American professional baseball pitcher
- Kyle Kennard (born 2001), American football player
- Kyle Kennedy, Irish singer on the television talent show The Voice of Ireland
- Kyle Kentish (born 1985), British Grand Prix motorcycle racer
- Kyle Kenyon (1924–1996), American Republican politician
- Kyle Killen, American television writer and producer
- Kyle Killion (born 1984), American football linebacker
- Kyle Kinane (born 1976), American stand-up comedian
- Kyle Kingsbury (born 1982), American mixed martial artist
- Kyle Kirkwood (born 1998), American auto racing driver
- Kyle Klubertanz (born 1985), professional American ice hockey defenseman
- Kyle Knotek (born 1988), American soccer player
- Kyle Knoyle (born 1996), English footballer
- Kyle Knox (born 1989), Canadian football player
- Kyle Koch (born 1984), professional Canadian football offensive lineman
- Kyle Konrardy (born 2004), American football player
- Kyle Konwea (born 1989), Swedish footballer
- Kyle Kopp (born 1966), American water polo player
- Kyle Korver (born 1981), American basketball player
- Kyle Kosier (born 1978), American NFL football player with the Dallas Cowboys
- Kyle Kragen (born 1993), American football player
- Kyle Krisiloff (born 1986), American race car driver
- Kyle Kubitza (born 1990), American baseball player
- Kyle Kuric (born 1989), American basketball player
- Kyle Kuzma (born 1995), American basketball player
- Kyle Labine (born 1983), Canadian actor
- Kyle Lafferty (born 1987), Northern Irish association footballer
- Kyle Lake (1972–2005), American pastor of University Baptist Church
- Kyle Landas (born 1979), American fine art artist
- Kyle Lander (born 1996), Scottish professional footballer
- Kyle Landry (born 1990), Canadian professional basketball player
- Kyle Larson (disambiguation), multiple people
- Kyle Lauletta (born 1995), American football player
- Kyle Legault (born 1985), Canadian speedway rider
- Kyle Lehning (born 1949), American record producer
- Kyle Letheren (born 1987), Welsh professional footballer
- Kyle Lewis (born 1995), American baseball player
- Kyle Lightbourne (born 1968), Bermudian footballer
- Kyle Linahan, Australian singer and TV presenter
- Kyle Lobstein (born 1989), American minor league baseball pitcher
- Kyle Logue, American law professor
- Kyle Lohse (born 1978), American baseball player
- Kyle Long (born 1988), American football offensive guard
- Kyle Lotzkar (born 1989), Canadian minor league baseball pitcher
- Kyle Louis (born 2004), American football player
- Kyle Love (born 1986), American football defensive end
- Kyle Lovett (born 1993), Australian professional rugby league footballer
- Kyle Lowder (born 1980), American actor
- Kyle Lowry (born 1986), American professional basketball player
- Kyle Loza (born 1986), FMX freestyle motocross rider
- Kyle Lukoff (born 1984), American author and former bookseller
- Kyle Macaulay (born 1986), Scottish professional footballer
- Kyle Mack (born 1997), American snowboarder
- Kyle Mackey (born 1962), American arena football League player and coach
- Kyle MacKinnon (born 1987), American hockey player
- Kyle MacLachlan (born 1959), American actor
- Kyle Macy (born 1957), American basketball broadcaster
- Kyle Magee (born 2001), Irish cricketer
- Kyle Magennis (born 1998), Scottish professional footballer
- Kyle Manzardo (born 2000), American baseball player
- Kyle Markway (born 1997), American football player
- Kyle Marquart, American politician
- Kyle Martel (born 1987), American professional stock car racing driver
- Kyle Martin (disambiguation), multiple people
- Kyle Martino (born 1981), American soccer player
- Kyle Massey (born 1991), American actor
- Kyle Dean Massey (born 1981), American theatre performer
- Kyle Maxwell (born 1990), Barbadian judoka
- Kyle Mayers (born 1992), Barbadian cricket player
- Kyle Maynard (born 1986), American speaker, author, and mixed marshal artist
- Kyle McAlarney (born 1987), American basketball coach
- Kyle McAllister (born 1999), Scottish footballer
- Kyle McAusland (born 1993), Scottish footballer
- Kyle McCall (born 1992), Irish rugby union player
- Kyle McCallan (born 1975), Irish cricketer
- Kyle McCarley (born 1985), American voice actor
- Kyle McCarter (born 1962), American ambassador to Kenya and member of the Illinois Senate
- Kyle McCarthy (American football) (born 1986), American football player
- Kyle McClean (born 1998), Northern Irish footballer
- Kyle McClellan (born 1984), American baseball player
- Kyle McClellan (ice hockey) (born 1999), American ice hockey player
- Kyle McCord (born 2002), American football player
- Kyle McCulloch (born 1962), Canadian writer
- Kyle McFadzean (born 1991), English professional footballer
- Kyle McGinn (born 1988), Australian politician
- Kyle McGowin (born 1987), American baseball player
- Kyle McGrath (born 1992), American baseball pitcher
- Kyle McLaren (born 1977), Canadian ice hockey player
- Kyle McNeely, real name of wrestler Onyx
- Kyle McPherson (born 1987), American baseball player
- Kyle E. McSlarrow (born 1960), former Deputy Secretary of the United States Department of Energy
- Kyle Miller (disambiguation), multiple people
- Kyle Milliken (born 1989), American computer hacker
- Kyle Mills (born 1979), New Zealand cricketer
- Kyle Minor (born 1976), American writer
- Kyle Mitchell (born 1983), American-Canadian football player
- Kyle Monangai (born 2002), American football player
- Kyle Mooney (born 1984), American comedian
- Kyle Moore (born 1986), American football player
- Kyle Moore-Brown (born 1971), American football player
- Kyle Moran (born 1987), Irish footballer
- Kyle Morrell (born 1963), American football defensive back
- Kyle Morton (born 1994), American soccer player
- Kyle Mosher (born 1985), American artist
- Kyle Muller (born 1997), American baseball player
- Kyle Mullica (born 1986), American politician
- Kyle Munro (born 2001), Scottish professional footballer
- Kyle Murphy (disambiguation), multiple people

=== N–R ===
- Kyle Nakazawa (born 1988), American soccer player
- Kyle Naughton (born 1988), English footballer
- Kyle Nelson (disambiguation), multiple people
- Kyle Newacheck (born 1984), American filmmaker and actor
- Kyle Newman (born 1976), American director, writer, producer and editor
- Kyle Nipper (born 1987), South African cricketer
- Kyle Nissen (born 1979), Canadian freestyle skier
- Kyle Nix (born 1986), Australian-born English footballer
- Kyle Noke (born 1980), Australian mixed martial artist
- Kyle Norris (born 1990), Canadian football player
- Kyle Okposo (born 1988), American ice hockey player
- Kyle Onstott (1887–1966), American novelist
- Kyle Orton (born 1982), American football player
- Kyle O'Donnell (born 1990), Australian rugby player
- Kyle O'Gara (born 1995), American racing driver
- Kyle O'Quinn (born 1990), American NBA basketball player
- Kyle O'Reilly (born 1987), Canadian professional wrestler
- Kyle Padron (born 1991), American football player
- Kyle Palmieri (born 1991), American hockey player
- Kyle Pascual (born 1990), Filipino basketball player
- Kyle Park (born 1985), American country singer
- Kyle Parker (born 1989), American baseball player
- Kyle Parrott (born 1985), Canadian long track speed skater
- Kyle Patrick (born 1986), American singer-songwriter
- Kyle Patterson (born 1986), English footballer
- Kyle Pennington (born 1979), American television writer
- Kyle Perry (born 1986), English footballer
- Kyle Peschel (born 1979), American video game producer
- Kyle Peterson (born 1976), American baseball player
- Kyle Pettey, Canadian paralympian
- Kyle Petty (born 1960), American racing commentator
- Kyle Pfeiffer (born 1990), American musician
- Kyle Philips (born 1999), American football player
- Kyle Phillips (disambiguation), multiple people
- Kyle Pierce (kinesiologist), American professor
- Kyle Pitts (born 2000), American football player
- Kyle Platzer (born 1995), Canadian hockey player
- Kyle Plott (born 1996), American professional stock car racing driver
- Kyle Polak (born 1984), American soccer player
- Kyle Pontifex (born 1980), New Zealand field hockey player
- Kyle Porter (born 1990), Canadian soccer player
- Kyle Prandi (born 1979), American Olympic diver
- Kyle Prater (born 1992), American football player
- Kyle Prepolec (born 1989), Canadian mixed martial arts fighter
- Kyle Pruett (born 1943), American physician and author
- Kyle Pryor (born 1984), English actor
- Kyle Queiro (born 1994), American football player
- Kyle Quincey (born 1985), Canadian hockey player
- Kyle Quinlan (born 1989), American football coach
- Kyle Rae (born 1954), Canadian politician
- Kyle Randall (born 1991), American basketball player
- Kyle Rankin (born 1972), American filmmaker
- Kyle Rapps (born 1980), American hip-hop musician
- Kyle Rasmussen (born 1968), American alpine skier
- Kyle Rau (born 1992), American hockey player
- Kyle Rea (born 1981), American actor and producer
- Kyle Rees (born 1988), Welsh actor
- Kyle Reeves (born 1971), Canadian ice hockey player
- Kyle Regnault (born 1988), American baseball player
- Kyle Reifers (born 1983), American professional golfer
- Kyle Reimers (born 1989), Australian footballer
- Kyle Renfro (born 1991), American soccer player
- Kyle Reynish (born 1983), American soccer player
- Kyle Riabko (born 1987), Canadian musician
- Kyle Richardson (disambiguation), multiple people
- Kyle Rideout (born 1984), Canadian actor, writer and director
- Kyle Rittenhouse (born 2003), American defendant acquitted in the 2020 Kenosha unrest shooting
- Kyle Roberts (born 1992), American football player
- Kyle Roche (born 1987), American attorney
- Kyle Roller (born 1988), American baseball player
- Kyle Ross (born 1983), Canadian professional lacrosse player
- Kyle Rossiter (born 1980), Canadian hockey player
- Kyle Rote (1927–2002), American football player
- Kyle Rote, Jr. (born 1950), American soccer player
- Kyle Rowe (born 1998), Scottish rugby union player
- Kyle Rowley (born 1979), American football player
- Kyle Rubisch (born 1988), American lacrosse player
- Kyle Rudolph (born 1989), American football player
- Kyle Russell (disambiguation), multiple people
- Kyle Ryan (born 1991), American baseball player
- Kyle Ryde (born 1997), British motorcycle road racer

=== S–Z ===
- Kyle Salyards (born 1980), American swimmer
- Kyle Sampson (born 1969), American politician and attorney
- Kyle Sandilands (born 1971), Australian radio presenter
- Kyle Saylors (born 1973), American film producer
- Kyle Saxelid (born 1995), Canadian football player
- Kyle Schickner, American film producer
- Kyle Schmid (born 1984), Canadian actor
- Kyle Schuneman (born 1985), American interior designer
- Kyle Schwarber (born 1993), American baseball player
- Kyle Scott (born 1997), English footballer
- Kyle Seager (born 1987), American baseball player
- Kyle Secor (born 1957), American television and film actor
- Kyle Seeback (born 1970), Canadian lawyer
- Kyle Segebart (born 1987), American soccer player
- Kyle Selig (born 1992), American actor
- Kyle Shelford (born 1996), English professional rugby league footballer
- Kyle Shanahan (born 1979), American football coach
- Kyle Shepherd (born 1987), South African musician
- Kyle Shewfelt (born 1982), American gymnast
- Kyle Shurmur (born 1996), American football player
- Kyle Sieg (born 2001), American NASCAR driver
- Kyle Sinckler (born 1993), English professional rugby player
- Kyle Singer (born 1980), American soccer player
- Kyle Singler (born 1988), American basketball player
- Kyle Skipworth (born 1990), American baseball player
- Kyle Sleeth (born 1981), American baseball player
- Kyle Sloter (born 1994), American football player
- Kyle E. Smalley (born 1961), American amateur astronomer
- Kyle Smith (disambiguation), multiple people
- Kyle Snyder (disambiguation), multiple people
- Kyle Sokol (born 1974), American bassist and skateboarder
- Kyle Soller (born 1983), American actor
- Kyle Sonnenburg (born 1986), Canadian-German ice hockey player
- Kyle Sorensen (born 1986), Canadian lacrosse player
- Kyle South (born 1981), American politician
- Kyle Spence (born 1997), English professional footballer
- Kyle Spencer, multiple people
- Kyle Stanford (born 1970), American professor
- Kyle Stanger (born 1997), British actor
- Kyle Stanley (born 1987), American professional golfer
- Kyle Staver (born 1953), American artist
- Kyle Steenland (born 1946), American professor
- Kyle Steyn (born 1994), Scottish rugby union player
- Kyle Stolk (born 1996), Dutch competitive swimmer
- Kyle Storer (born 1987), English footballer
- Kyle Stowers (born 1998), American baseball player
- Kyle Strickler (born 1983), American professional dirt track racing driver
- Kyle Sullivan (born 1988), American actor
- Kyle Sumsion (born 1993), American rugby union player
- Kyle Sutton (born 1980), American hip-hop artist
- Kyle Swanston (born 1986), American basketball player
- Kyle Sweeney (born 1981), American professional lacrosse player
- Kyle Switzer (born 1985), Canadian actor
- Kyle Swords (born 1974), American soccer player
- Kyle Taylor (born 1999), English professional footballer
- Kyle Testerman (1934–2015), American mayor of Knoxville, Tennessee
- Kyle Thomas (born 1983), Canadian filmmaker
- Kyle Thomas (born 2004), British influencer
- Kyle Thompson (born 1992), American photographer
- Kyle Thousand (born 1980), American sports agent
- Kyle Tonetti (born 1987), South African born Irish rugby player
- Kyle Townsend (born 1978), American record producer
- Kyle Trask (born 1998), American football player
- Kyle Traynor (born 1986), Scottish rugby union player
- Kyle Tress (born 1981), American skeleton racer
- Kyle Troup (born 1991), American professional ten-pin bowler
- Kyle Trout (born 1991), British rugby player
- Kyle Tucker (born 1997), American baseball player
- Kyle Tudge (born 1987), Welsh cricketer
- Kyle Turley (born 1975), American football player for the Kansas City Chiefs
- Kyle Turnbull (born 1995), Scottish professional footballer
- Kyle Turris (born 1989), Canadian ice hockey player
- Kyle Tyler (born 1996), American baseball player
- Kyle Uyehara (born 1989), American short track speed skater
- Kyle Van Noy (born 1991), American football player
- Kyle Vanden Bosch (born 1978), American football player
- Kyle Vander Kuyp (born 1971), Australian athlete
- Kyle Vashkulat (born 1990), Ukrainian-American judoka
- Kyle Vassell (born 1993), Northern Irish professional footballer
- Kyle Velasquez (1982–1998), victim of the Columbine Shooting
- Kyle Veris (born 1983), American soccer player
- Kyle Vinales (born 1992), American basketball player
- Kyle Vincent (born 1967), American singer-songwriter
- Kyle Visser (born 1985), American basketball player
- Kyle Vogt, American engineer
- Kyle Wachholtz (born 1972), American football player
- Kyle Wailes (born 1983), Canadian lacrosse player
- Kyle Waldrop (born 1991), American baseball player
- Kyle Walker (born 1990), English footballer
- Kyle Wanvig (born 1981), Canadian hockey player
- Kyle Ward (disambiguation), multiple people
- Kyle Watson, South African music producer and DJ
- Kyle Wealleans (born 1969), New Zealand cricketer
- Kyle Weatherman (born 1997), American professional stock car racing driver
- Kyle Weaver (born 1986), American professional basketball player
- Kyle Weems (born 1989), American basketball player
- Kyle Weiland (born 1986), American baseball player
- Kyle Wellwood (born 1983), Canadian ice hockey player
- Kyle White (born 1970), Australian rugby league footballer
- Kyle Whittingham (born 1959), American football coach
- Kyle Wieche (born 1967), American alpine skier
- Kyle Wilber (born 1989), American football player
- Kyle Wilkie (born 1991), Scottish footballer
- Kyle Williams (disambiguation), multiple people
- Kyle Wilson (disambiguation), multiple people
- Kyle Wiltjer (born 1992), Canadian-American basketball player
- Kyle Winter (born 1974), American rugby union player
- Kyle Wood (disambiguation), multiple people
- Kyle Woodring (1967–2009), American studio artist
- Kyle Wootton (born 1996), English footballer
- Kyle Wren (born 1991), American baseball player
- Kyle Wright (born 1995), American baseball player
- Kyle Yamada (born 1983), Canadian soccer player
- Kyle Yamashita (born 1959), American politician
- Kyle York (born 1982), American football player
- Kyle Yousaf (born 1990), British professional boxer
- Kyle Zajec (born 1997), American soccer player
- Kyle Zenoni (born 1984), American soccer player
- Kyle Zimmer (born 1991), American baseball player
- Kyle Zobeck (born 1990), American soccer player

== Women ==
- Kyle Aletter, American actress
- Kyle Carey (born 1988), American singer
- Kyle Chavarria (born 1995), American teen actress
- Kyle Copeland (born 1961), American tennis player
- Kyle deCamp, American multimedia performance artist
- Kyle DeWoody (born c. 1984 or 1985), American gallery owner and curator
- Kyle Evans Gay (born c. 1985 or 1986), American politician
- Kyle Kavanagh, American model
- Kyle Larsen, American actress
- Kyle MacDonnell (1922–2004), American actress
- Kyle Marsh, American actress
- Kyle Mewburn (born 1963), Australian-New Zealand writer
- Kyle J. Myers, American scientist
- Kyle Negrito (born 1996), Filipina volleyball player
- Kyle Danielle Ocampo, Filipina actress
- Kyle Rechlicz (born 1980), American women's basketball coach
- Kyle Richards (born 1969), American actress
- Kyle Spencer, American journalist
- Kyle Staver, American artist
- Kyle Zimmer (First Book), founder of First Book

== Fictional characters ==
- Kyle, foster sister of Andy Barclay from the Child's Play franchise
- Kyle Braxton, a character in Home and Away
- Kyle Broflovski, one of the main characters in South Park
- Kyle Bush, a character in Looped
- Kyle Canning, a character in Neighbours
- Kyle Katarn, the main character of the Star Wars: Jedi Knight series
- Kyle Rayner, a DC Comics character
- Kyle Reese, a character from the Terminator franchise
- Kyle Schwartz, the cousin of Kyle Broflovski from South Park
- Kyle Trager, the main character in the television series Kyle XY

== See also ==
- Sonia Keys (1961–2018), formerly known as Kyle Smalley
- Kyle (disambiguation)
- Kylie (name), unrelated but has a similar spelling
