= Karl Larsen (disambiguation) =

Karl Larsen is an American photographer.

Karl Larsen may also refer to:

- Karl Hess Larsen (1900–1966), Norwegian lawyer and politician
- Karl Alfred Larsen (wrestler) (1905–1982), Norwegian sport wrestler
- Karl Larsen, character in Secret Agent of Japan

== See also ==
- Karl Larsson (disambiguation)
- Carl Larson (disambiguation)
- Carl Larsen (disambiguation)
- Carl Larsson (1853–1919), Swedish painter and decorator
- Kyle Larson (disambiguation)
