= Jami Deadly =

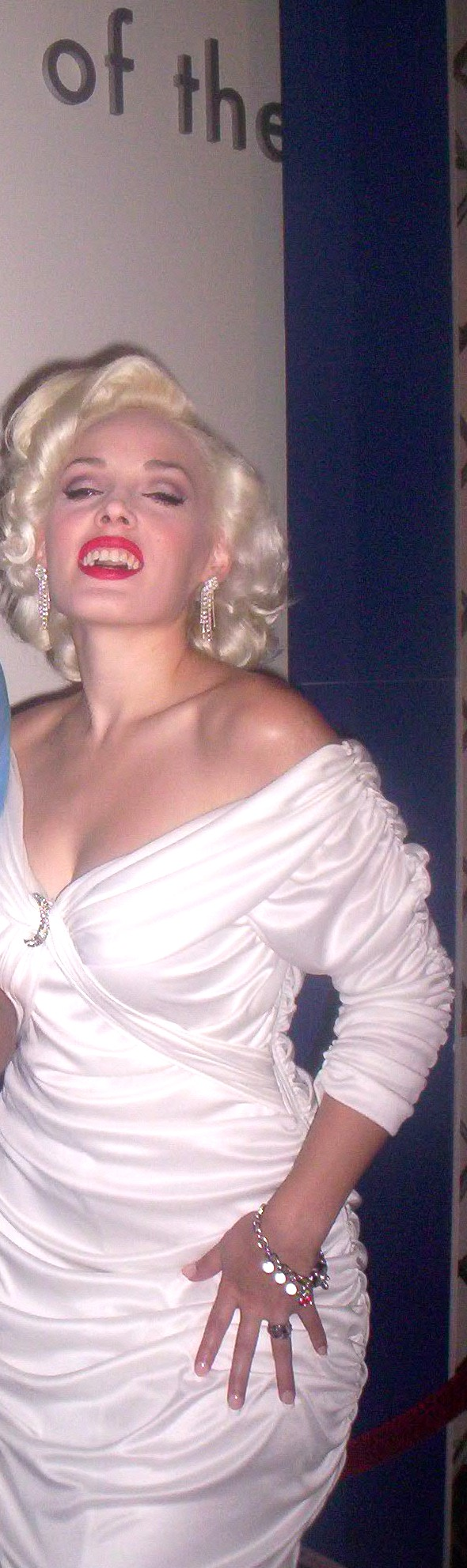
- Jami at the Marilyn Monroe Exhibit in Dallas
- Born: May 18, 1979
- Occupations: model, actress, burlesque dancer, horror host and singer
- Awards: Scream Queen of the Month; 2005

Jami Deadly (born May 18, 1979, as Jami Edwards) is an American actress, glamour model, singer, burlesque dancer and horror host. Jami grew up in Texas. She lives in Las Vegas, Nevada.

== Biography ==
Jami Edwards was a nightclub dancer. Along with students from the University of North Texas, she launched and hosted the horror host show Deadly Cinema which ran from 2003 to 2005 (2 seasons) on the Denton channel NTTV. The staff was amateur and working for school credits. The show is currently broadcast on Roku.

After Deadly Cinema, Jami Deadly became a burlesque performer. She made an appearance in the 2007 movie Devil Girl alongside Dita Von Teese. Jami is also a Marilyn Monroe tribute artist, and performed as such during the 2006 Texas State Fair. Jami's transformation into Marilyn is supported by a coach to help her coax her Texas twang into Marilyn's breathiness. She has taken singing and dancing lessons to perfect Marilyn's routines, and her blond hair requires weekly peroxide applications.

Jamie Deadly has modeled for Poison Candy and Versatile Fashions. She was a SuicideGirls model.

Since the mid-2000s, she only made rare appearances in public events.

== Filmography ==
Film
Year	Film	Role
2006	Vampira: The Movie	Herself
2007	Devil Girl	Burlesque Performer
Television
Year	Title	Role
2003–2005	Deadly Cinema	Jami Deadly

== Prizes ==
- 2005: Scream Queen of the month by Screamqueen.com
