= Cyle =

Cyle is a male given name. Notable people with the name include:

- Cyle Brink (born 1994), South African rugby union player
- Cyle Larin (born 1995), Canadian soccer player

== See also ==
- Kyle (given name)
