= Uyehara =

Uyehara is a surname. Notable people with the surname include:

- Denise Uyehara, American performance artist
- Grayce Uyehara (1919–2014), Japanese-American social worker
- Kyle Uyehara (born 1989), American speed skater
- Margaret A. Uyehara (born 1958), American diplomat
