= Landas (disambiguation) =

Landas is a commune in northern France, Landas may also refer to

- Landås, a neighbourhood in the city of Bergen, Norway
- Kyle Landas (born 1979), American craftsperson
- Rudolph de Landas Berghes (1873–1920), Regionary Bishop of Scotland
