= Kylie Williams =

Kylie Williams may refer to:

- Kylie Williams (Miss Florida) (born 1983), American model and Miss Florida 2007 winner
- Kylie Williams (geoscientist), Canadian geoscientist and recipient of the 2021 E. R. Ward Neale Medal

== See also ==
- Kyle Williams (disambiguation)
