= Carl Larsen =

Carl Larsen may refer to:

- Carl Larsen (gymnast) (1886–1962), Danish gymnast
- Carl Anton Larsen (1860–1924), Norwegian Antarctic explorer
- Emanuel Larsen (Carl Frederik Emanuel Larsen, 1823–1859), Danish painter
- Carl G. Larsen (1844–1928), Danish emigrant to San Francisco and Larsen Park donor
- Carl Larsen (footballer) (1911–1995), Danish footballer

== See also ==
- Carl Larson (disambiguation)
- Carl Larsson (1853–1919), Swedish painter and interior designer
- Karl Larsen (disambiguation)
- Karl Larsson (disambiguation)
