= Ann Ashmead =

American archaeologist (1929–2026)

- Born: October 7, 1929; Princeton, New Jersey, U.S.
- Died: January 17, 2026 (aged 96)

Academic background
- Education: Bryn Mawr College

Academic work
- Discipline: Archaeology

Ann Wheeler Ashmead (née Harnwell; October 7, 1929 – January 17, 2026) was an American archaeologist who specialised in Greek Vase Painting.

== Early life and education ==
Ann Harnwell was born in Princeton, New Jersey, and moved to Wynnewood, Pennsylvania in 1938, after her father Gaylord Harnwell was appointed to the Physics department at the University of Pennsylvania. During World War II, her family moved to California for three years. Upon returning East, she graduated from Lower Merion High School in 1947. She received her archaeology education at Bryn Mawr College, BA (1952, Honors, Magna Cum Laude), MA (1954), and PhD (1959) in Classical Archaeology with Rhys Carpenter. Her doctoral thesis was on the painter Onesimos.

== Career ==
Awarded an Ella Riegel Fellowship, Ashmead worked with Lucy Talcott in 1956-1957 at the American School of Classical Studies at Athens on the excavations at the Ancient Agora of Athens, under the directorship of Homer Thompson and his wife Dorothy Burr Thompson, and published the fragments of vases from the Athenian Agora by the Kleophrades Painter. Ashmead then taught at Bryn Mawr College and was the curator for the Ella Riegel Museum. She became a research associate at the University of Pennsylvania Museum of Archaeology and Anthropology, having written and compiled its Corpus vasorum antiquorum with Kyle Meredith Phillips, Jr..

Ashmead co-authored comprehensive catalogues with archaeologist and Etruscologist Kyle Meredith Phillips, Jr. of the Greek Vase Painting collections of Bryn Mawr College (1971) and the Rhode Island School of Design (1976). She also wrote the main catalogue for the Antiquities Collection of Haverford College (1999). and published many articles on Greek Vases.

Ashmead was a classical Greek vase painting expert, the leading authority on depictions of cats, particularly the cheetah, on 5th Century Red-Figured Greek Vases.

== Personal life and death ==
For most of Ashmead's career, she was married to the Haverford College professor and writer John Ashmead. They wed on October 15, 1949, and had five children: John Ashmead, Graham Gaylord Ashmead, Gaylord Harnwell Ashmead, Louisa Harral Ashmead, and Theodora Wheeler Ashmead. They divorced in 1976.

Ashmead died on January 17, 2026, at the age of 96.

== Selected works ==
- Corpus Vasorum Antiquorum. [United States of America]. The Ella Riegel Memorial Museum, Bryn Mawr College.(1971) by Ann Harnwell Ashmead and Kyle Meredith Phillips.
- Classical Vases : Excluding Attic Black-Figure, Attic Red-Figure and Attic White Ground, Catalogue of the Classical Collection, Museum of Art Rhode Island School of Design, (1976) by Ann Harnwell Ashmead and Kyle Meredith Phillips, Jr., dedicated to Richmond Lattimore and Richard Stillwell.
- Haverford College Collection of Classical Antiquities,(1999) by Ann Harnwell Ashmead.
- “Fragments by the Kleophrades Painter from the Athenian Agora,” Hesperia 35 (1966), pp. 20–36, pls. 7-12.
- “An Unpublished Cup by Makron in Philadelphia,” American Journal of Archaeology 70 (1966) pp. 66–68 in collaboration with Kyle Meredith Phillips.
- “A Chong Byong at Bryn Mawr College and its twin in Honolulu,” Archives of Asian Art XX (1966–67), pp 80–81.
- Contributor to The Frederick M. Watkins College, The Fogg Art Museum, January 31, 1973 to March 31, 1974, pp. 45–52 in collaboration with Kyle Meredith Phillips.
- “Greek Cats: Exotic Pets Kept by Rich Youths in Fifth Century B.C. Athens as Portrayed on Greek Vases,” Expedition vol. 20, no. 3, Spring 1978, pp. 38–47.
- “Three Goddesses and a Falcon,” Studies in Classical Art and Archaeology: A Tribute to Peter Heinrich von Blanckenhagen, Locust Valley, New York, 1979 (Edited by G. Kopcke and M. Moore) 45-52, with Kyle Meredith Phillips.
- “Undoing the Past: Changing Attitudes Towards the Restoration of Greek Pots,” Expedition, vol. 30, no.2 (1989) pp. 21–28, with Kyle Meredith Phillips. https://www.penn.museum/sites/expedition/volume/30/page/2/
- “A Lekythos by the Pan Painter at Haverford College: Bread and Soup for Dinner?,” Eumousia: Ceramic and Iconographic Studies in Honor of Alexander Cambitoglou Mediterranean Archaeology Mediterranean Archaeology Suppl. I Edited by Jean-Paul Descoeudres (Sydney, 1990), pp. 95–103.
- “A Monstrously Good Idea,” Review of Adrienne Mayor article, Paleocryptozoology, Vol. 9, (1991).
- “The Tame Etruscan Cat: Classical Conformist or Etruscan Original,” Murlo and the Etruscans: Art and Society in Ancient Etruria Edited by Richard De Puma and Jocelyn Penny Small (Madison, Wisconsin, 1994).
