= Karl Larsson =

Karl or Carl Larsson may refer to:

- Karl Larsson (artist) (1893–1967), Swedish-American artist
- Karl Larsson (sport shooter) (1865–1943), Swedish sports shooter
- Karl August Larsson (1906–1971), Swedish sports shooter
- Karl Larson, a character in the 2000 film Supernova
- Carl Larsson (1853–1919), Swedish painter and interior designer

== See also ==
- Karl Larsen (disambiguation)
- Carl Larson (disambiguation)
- Carl Larsen (disambiguation)
