= Cheryl Lyndsey =

American singer–songwriter and musician (born 1978)

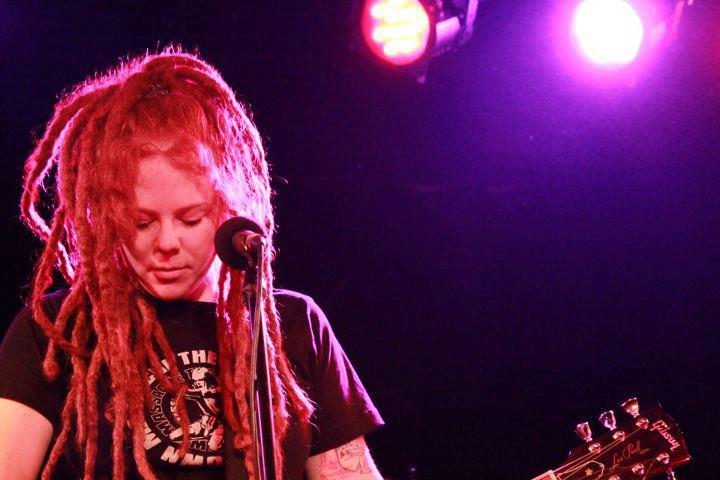
- Cheryl Lyndsey performing with the Carrions at El Cid, Los Angeles, CA in 2012

Background information
- Born: Cheryl Lane Lyndsey; May 7, 1978 (age 47); Vero Beach, Florida, US
- Origin: Orlando, Florida, US
- Genres: Alternative rock, indie rock, psychedelic metal, hard rock, glam punk
- Occupation: Musician
- Instruments: Guitar, vocals, drums, keyboard, bass guitar
- Years active: 1995–present
- Label: Xemu Records
- Website: Mono Ono Productions; The Carrions website HALT website

Cheryl Lane Lyndsey (born May 7, 1978) is an American singer–songwriter and musician best known as touring member of alternative rock band The Breeders. She is noted as guitarist for Exene Cervenka's solo band and contributed to Exene's 2011 album The Excitement of Maybe. She was declared "One of LA's Best" by LA Weekly.

== Musical career ==
Cheryl Lyndsey currently fronts Los Angeles rock band the Carrions as guitarist and singer. Their debut album A New Level of Neon (2012) was recorded by Steve Kille of Dead Meadow and mastered by Howie Weinberg (Nirvana's Nevermind) and is distributed by Kille's label Xemu Records. Lyndsey was the drummer of Los Angeles-based rock band HALT, a band formed with Skeleteen co-founder Kyle DiFulvio and fellow Carrions member Michèle Lane.

Lyndsey is most noted for her work as touring guitarist, keyboardist, and backing vocalist for Kim Deal's band the Breeders. She toured with the Breeders in support of their Mountain Battles album and Fate to Fatal EP. Deal reported that the band found Lyndsey through a Craigslist ad.

Lyndsey also served as touring acoustic guitarist for Exene Cervenka's solo band, and contributed to a track on Exene's album The Excitement of Maybe.

She began her music career in the mid-1990s in Orlando, Florida as bassist and backing vocalist in glam punk band Dirty Barby and as drummer and co-vocalist in hard rock band Skeleteen.

== Personal life ==
Cheryl currently lives in the deep south playing in bands "CHEEKS" & "Werewolf Hours" and her podcast "The Livin' With Me Show" at CherylsShows.com

== Discography ==
With The Carrions:

- A New Level of Neon (2012, Xemu Records)

With Exene Cervenka:

- The Excitement of Maybe (2011, Bloodshot Records)

With Skeleteen:

- Sorry for Everything (2003, DB Records)
