= Kyle Miller =

Kyle Miller may refer to:

- Kyle Miller (footballer) (born 1992), Scottish footballer
- Kyle Miller (Counter-Strike player) (born 1984), American Counter-strike player
- Kyle Miller (American football) (born 1988), American football tight end
- Kyle Miller (lacrosse) (1981–2013), Canadian lacrosse player
- Kyle Miller (soccer) (born 1989), American soccer player
- Kyle Miller (golfer) (born 1990), Canadian golfer
- Kyle Miller (politician), American politician
