= Eric "Red Mouth" Gebhardt =

American singer-songwriter

Eric Gebhardt
- Also known as: Red Mouth
- Born: Eric Gebhardt
- Origin: Texas
- Genres: American roots music Punk rock Alternative rock Blues-rock; Country; Hard rock Acoustic; Gospel; Honky Tonk
- Occupations: Musician
- Instruments: Guitar banjo lap steel
- Years active: ?-present
- Labels: High Society Records; Orange Recordings; Pegasus Records
- Website: www.redmouth.net

Eric "Red Mouth" Gebhardt is an American singer-songwriter, from Alabama (born in Vernon, Texas) who plays a blend of southern music that blends punk, post punk, proto punk, blues, broken-hearted honky tonk, Stonesy rock and roll, with gospel music. Blues in London described his sound as:

"a joyfully chaotic reworking of the common sources... identifiably adhering to bluesey, country, folky, forms but happy to accept (actively embrace) a loose interpretation of the detail... a great blend of sarsparilla Americana styles pulled together without meandering to 'authenticity', and played with a wit and verve that honour it's antecedents whilst managing a contemporary freshness."

Gebhardt started in a band dubbed The Throwaways who still perform occasionally around the north Alabama area. The band's most notable achievement was a one-off release with High Society Records, an independent record label in Hamburg, Germany. The record did well in Europe, where the band never toured to support the release. The label folded shortly after.

Following the disappointment, Gebhardt moved to Orlando, Florida and formed The Studdogs with Dickie Evans and Jeremy Talcott. Gebhardt stayed with the group for five years, releasing three compact discs. The band was signed by Orange Recordings in Los Angeles and toured all over the country, sharing bills with the Demolition Doll Rods, the Porch Ghouls, Bob Log III, and the Immortal Lee County Killers. His songwriting, however, started to outgrow the sleazy blues rock of the Studdogs, and Gebhardt left the band to pursue a solo career.

This growing interest in songwriting brought Gebhardt back to Florence, and later Biloxi, Mississippi, where his Delta blues-influenced solo acoustic performances (and blazing red beard) earned him the bluesman nickname "Red Mouth."

In 2005, Red Mouth released his solo debut Blues $1.49/lb which scored critical favor in the underground American circuits and the United Kingdom. Blues in London loved the album so much that they appointed Gebhardt as their own personal "man in the States." He regularly writes articles on underground American blues artists, documenting the rigors of life on the road, and occasionally reviews records.

Joe Mauceri of the Dictator Monthly described him as "the bastard rebel child of Lou Reed."

In 2010, Redmouth performed in Lausanne, Switzerland at the 1st Annual Blues Rules Festival. This was a two-day concert featuring acts from around Europe and the United States.

In 2023, after a five-year hiatus (during which "Et Tu Brute" was completed and released to public and critical acclaim), Gebhardt emerged with a new configuration of his backing band, reputedly called Coke Mirror, consisting of veteran Red Mouth associates Jason Hall (bass), Nathan Pitts (lead guitar) and newcomer Bryan Cabler, formerly of Western Civ (drums). Following an unannounced appearance at an underground venue in rural Colbert County, Alabama, on July 1 (billed as "Strutter"), the band announced its first hometown gig at Florence's Lava Room, to take place on July 29. The show reportedly sold out weeks in advance. Recording of a new Red Mouth album was reportedly underway as of mid-2023.
