= 2019 Lucas Oil 150 =

Race details
- Race 22 of 23 in the 2019 NASCAR Gander Outdoors Truck Series season
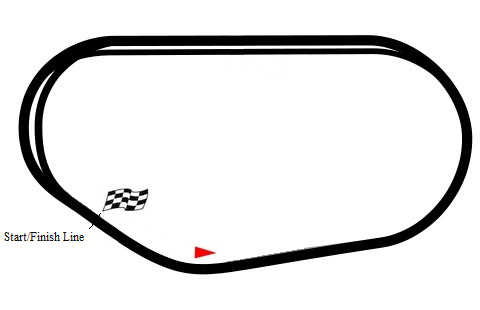
- Date: November 8, 2019
- Location: ISM Raceway in Avondale, Arizona
- Course: Permanent racing facility
- Course length: 1 miles (1.6 km)
- Distance: 150 laps, 150 mi (241.402 km)

Pole position
Driver	Austin Hill	Hattori Racing Enterprises
- Time: 27.021

Most laps led
Driver	Ben Rhodes	ThorSport Racing
- Laps: 47

Winner
No. 52	Stewart Friesen	Halmar Friesen Racing

Television in the United States
- Network: FS1

Radio in the United States
- Radio: MRN

The 2019 Lucas Oil 150 is a NASCAR Gander Outdoors Truck Series race held on November 8, 2019, at ISM Raceway in Avondale, Arizona. Contested over 150 laps on the one-mile (1.6 km) oval, it was the 22nd race of the 2019 NASCAR Gander Outdoors Truck Series season, sixth race of the Playoffs, and final race of the Round of 6.

== Background ==
=== Track ===
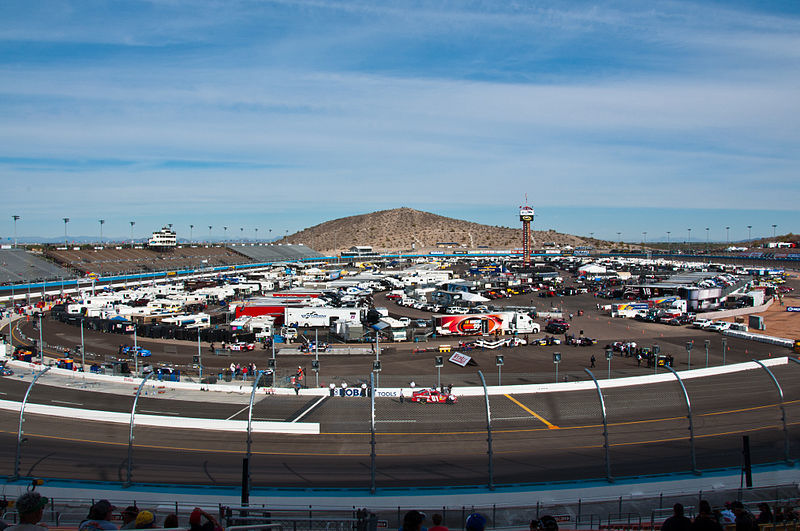
ISM Raceway, the track where the race was held.

ISM Raceway is a 1-mile, low-banked tri-oval race track located in Avondale, Arizona, near Phoenix. The motorsport track opened in 1964 and currently hosts two NASCAR race weekends annually. ISM Raceway has also hosted the CART, IndyCar Series, USAC and the WeatherTech SportsCar Championship. The raceway is currently owned and operated by International Speedway Corporation.

== Entry list ==
No.	Driver	Team	Manufacturer
02	Tyler Dippel (R)	Young's Motorsports	Chevrolet
2	Sheldon Creed (R)	GMS Racing	Chevrolet
3	Jordan Anderson	Jordan Anderson Racing	Chevrolet
4	Todd Gilliland	Kyle Busch Motorsports	Toyota
5	Dylan Lupton	DGR-Crosley	Toyota
7	Tanner Gray	DGR-Crosley	Toyota
8	John Hunter Nemechek (i)	NEMCO Motorsports	Chevrolet
10	Jennifer Jo Cobb	Jennifer Jo Cobb Racing	Chevrolet
12	Gus Dean (R)	Young's Motorsports	Chevrolet
13	Johnny Sauter	ThorSport Racing	Ford
15	Anthony Alfredo (R)	DGR-Crosley	Toyota
16	Austin Hill	Hattori Racing Enterprises	Toyota
17	Tyler Ankrum (R)	DGR-Crosley	Toyota
18	Harrison Burton (R)	Kyle Busch Motorsports	Toyota
19	Derek Kraus	Bill McAnally Racing	Toyota
20	Colby Howard (R)	Young's Motorsports	Chevrolet
21	Sam Mayer	GMS Racing	Chevrolet
22	Austin Wayne Self	AM Racing	Chevrolet
24	Brett Moffitt	GMS Racing	Chevrolet
30	Danny Bohn	On Point Motorsports	Toyota
33	Carson Ware (R)	Reaume Brothers Racing	Toyota
34	Kyle Plott (R)	Reaume Brothers Racing	Toyota
44	Ty Majeski (R)	Niece Motorsports	Chevrolet
45	Ross Chastain	Niece Motorsports	Chevrolet
46	Chandler Smith	Kyle Busch Motorsports	Toyota
51	Brandon Jones (i)	Kyle Busch Motorsports	Toyota
52	Stewart Friesen	Halmar Friesen Racing	Chevrolet
54	Natalie Decker (R)	DGR-Crosley	Toyota
56	Carson Hocevar	Jordan Anderson Racing	Chevrolet
87	Joe Nemechek	NEMCO Motorsports	Chevrolet
88	Matt Crafton	ThorSport Racing	Ford
97	Jesse Little	JJL Motorsports	Ford
98	Grant Enfinger	ThorSport Racing	Ford
99	Ben Rhodes	ThorSport Racing	Ford

== Practice ==
=== First practice ===
Chandler Smith was the fastest in the first practice session with a time of 26.918 seconds and a speed of 133.740 mph (215.234 km/h).

Pos	No.	Driver	Team	Manufacturer	Time	Speed
1	46	Chandler Smith	Kyle Busch Motorsports	Toyota	26.918	133.740
2	52	Stewart Friesen	Halmar Friesen Racing	Chevrolet	26.935	133.655
3	17	Tyler Ankrum (R)	DGR-Crosley	Toyota	27.008	133.294

=== Final practice ===
Harrison Burton was the fastest in the final practice session with a time of 26.968 seconds and a speed of 133.492 mph (214.835 km/h).

Pos	No.	Driver	Team	Manufacturer	Time	Speed
1	18	Harrison Burton (R)	Kyle Busch Motorsports	Toyota	26.968	133.492
2	46	Chandler Smith	Kyle Busch Motorsports	Toyota	26.981	133.427
3	52	Stewart Friesen	Halmar Friesen Racing	Chevrolet	27.014	133.264

== Qualifying ==
Austin Hill scored the pole for the race with a time of 27.021 seconds and a speed of 133.230 mph (214.413 km/h).

=== Qualifying results ===
Pos	No	Driver	Team	Manufacturer	Time
1	16	Austin Hill	Hattori Racing Enterprises	Toyota	27.021
2	52	Stewart Friesen	Halmar Friesen Racing	Chevrolet	27.042
3	2	Sheldon Creed (R)	GMS Racing	Chevrolet	27.070
4	99	Ben Rhodes	ThorSport Racing	Ford	27.078
5	44	Ty Majeski (R)	Niece Motorsports	Chevrolet	27.093
6	46	Chandler Smith	Kyle Busch Motorsports	Toyota	27.101
7	51	Brandon Jones (i)	Kyle Busch Motorsports	Toyota	27.121
8	98	Grant Enfinger	ThorSport Racing	Ford	27.128
9	4	Todd Gilliland	Kyle Busch Motorsports	Toyota	27.130
10	88	Matt Crafton	ThorSport Racing	Ford	27.164
11	13	Johnny Sauter	ThorSport Racing	Ford	27.181
12	24	Brett Moffitt	GMS Racing	Chevrolet	27.186
13	15	Anthony Alfredo (R)	DGR-Crosley	Toyota	27.198
14	45	Ross Chastain	Niece Motorsports	Chevrolet	27.254
15	17	Tyler Ankrum (R)	DGR-Crosley	Toyota	27.266
16	5	Dylan Lupton	DGR-Crosley	Toyota	27.341
17	56	Carson Hocevar	Jordan Anderson Racing	Chevrolet	27.359
18	02	Tyler Dippel (R)	Young's Motorsports	Chevrolet	27.433
19	12	Gus Dean (R)	Young's Motorsports	Chevrolet	27.470
20	7	Tanner Gray	DGR-Crosley	Toyota	27.484
21	21	Sam Mayer	GMS Racing	Chevrolet	27.503
22	8	John Hunter Nemechek (i)	NEMCO Motorsports	Chevrolet	27.510
23	19	Derek Kraus	Bill McAnally Racing	Toyota	27.511
24	3	Jordan Anderson	Jordan Anderson Racing	Chevrolet	27.620
25	22	Austin Wayne Self	AM Racing	Chevrolet	27.626
26	87	Joe Nemechek	NEMCO Motorsports	Chevrolet	27.642
27	30	Danny Bohn	On Point Motorsports	Toyota	27.671
28	20	Colby Howard (R)	Young's Motorsports	Chevrolet	27.748
29	34	Kyle Plott (R)	Reaume Brothers Racing	Toyota	27.905
30	54	Natalie Decker (R)	DGR-Crosley	Toyota	27.909
31	33	Carson Ware (R)	Reaume Brothers Racing	Toyota	29.845
32	18	Harrison Burton (R)	Kyle Busch Motorsports	Toyota	0.000
Did not qualify
33	97	Jesse Little	JJL Motorsports	Ford	27.857
34	10	Jennifer Jo Cobb	Jennifer Jo Cobb Racing	Chevrolet	28.825

. – Playoffs driver

== Race ==
=== Summary ===
Austin Hill started on pole. Stewart Friesen was penalized for beating Hill to the start/finish line on the initial start. A caution flew on lap 2 for Brandon Jones spinning in turn 2, sending Friesen to the rear of the field on the restart. On the restart, Ben Rhodes took the lead when Hill was unable to keep up speed.

The caution flag flew for John Hunter Nemechek swerving below Kraus as they entered turn 3, hitting Kraus and sending him into the wall. Rhodes battled Chandler Smith on the restart, ultimately completing a pass and winning Stage 1.

Chastain struggled in Stage 2 as only his left-side tires were changed. Stage 2 was won by Jones, while Brett Moffitt secured a spot in the championship 4 due to having a significant points lead. This left Chastain, Friesen, Hill, and Matt Crafton battling for the remaining spots.

The final stage only saw one caution, occurring when Sam Mayer overdrove in a turn and collected Nemechek. On the restart, Friesen slipped his way through the pack and caught up to Jones, overtaking him with 4 laps remaining. Jones attempted to take the lead, but Friesen successfully blocked him on the corners and held him off to win the race and a spot in the championship 4. Chastain and Crafton (with a 13 point and 6 point respective lead over the cutoff) secured the last two spots over Hill, whose stage points weren't enough to overtake Crafton for a spot. Tyler Ankrum was also eliminated due to not winning any stage points and falling too far behind in the race.

=== Stage Results ===
Stage One Laps: 40

Pos	No	Driver	Team	Manufacturer	Points
1	99	Ben Rhodes	ThorSport Racing	Ford	10
2	46	Chandler Smith	Kyle Busch Motorsports	Toyota	9
3	88	Matt Crafton	ThorSport Racing	Ford	8
4	45	Ross Chastain	Niece Motorsports	Chevrolet	7
5	24	Brett Moffitt	GMS Racing	Chevrolet	6
6	4	Todd Gilliland	Kyle Busch Motorsports	Toyota	5
7	16	Austin Hill	Hattori Racing Enterprises	Toyota	4
8	98	Grant Enfinger	ThorSport Racing	Ford	3
9	52	Stewart Friesen	Halmar Friesen Racing	Chevrolet	2
10	13	Johnny Sauter	ThorSport Racing	Ford	1

Stage Two Laps: 40

Pos	No	Driver	Team	Manufacturer	Points
1	51	Brandon Jones (i)	Kyle Busch Motorsports	Toyota	0
2	88	Matt Crafton	ThorSport Racing	Ford	9
3	46	Chandler Smith	Kyle Busch Motorsports	Toyota	8
4	52	Stewart Friesen	Halmar Friesen Racing	Chevrolet	7
5	18	Harrison Burton (R)	Kyle Busch Motorsports	Toyota	6
6	16	Austin Hill	Hattori Racing Enterprises	Toyota	5
7	4	Todd Gilliland	Kyle Busch Motorsports	Toyota	4
8	2	Sheldon Creed (R)	GMS Racing	Chevrolet	3
9	24	Brett Moffitt	GMS Racing	Chevrolet	2
10	13	Johnny Sauter	ThorSport Racing	Ford	1

=== Final Stage Results ===
Stage Three Laps: 70

Pos	Grid	No	Driver	Team	Manufacturer	Laps	Points
1	2	52	Stewart Friesen	Halmar Friesen Racing	Chevrolet	150	49
2	7	51	Brandon Jones (i)	Kyle Busch Motorsports	Toyota	150	0
3	6	46	Chandler Smith	Kyle Busch Motorsports	Toyota	150	51
4	4	99	Ben Rhodes	ThorSport Racing	Ford	150	43
5	8	98	Grant Enfinger	ThorSport Racing	Ford	150	35
6	10	88	Matt Crafton	ThorSport Racing	Ford	150	48
7	32	18	Harrison Burton (R)	Kyle Busch Motorsports	Toyota	150	36
8	11	13	Johnny Sauter	ThorSport Racing	Ford	150	31
9	14	45	Ross Chastain	Niece Motorsports	Chevrolet	150	35
10	12	24	Brett Moffitt	GMS Racing	Chevrolet	150	35
11	5	44	Ty Majeski (R)	Niece Motorsports	Chevrolet	150	26
12	3	2	Sheldon Creed (R)	GMS Racing	Chevrolet	150	28
13	1	16	Austin Hill	Hattori Racing Enterprises	Toyota	150	33
14	9	4	Todd Gilliland	Kyle Busch Motorsports	Toyota	150	32
15	18	02	Tyler Dippel (R)	Young's Motorsports	Chevrolet	150	22
16	16	5	Dylan Lupton	DGR-Crosley	Toyota	150	21
17	20	7	Tanner Gray	DGR-Crosley	Toyota	149	20
18	25	22	Austin Wayne Self	AM Racing	Chevrolet	149	19
19	21	21	Sam Mayer	GMS Racing	Chevrolet	149	18
20	19	12	Gus Dean (R)	Young's Motorsports	Chevrolet	149	17
21	28	20	Colby Howard (R)	Young's Motorsports	Chevrolet	149	16
22	30	54	Natalie Decker (R)	DGR-Crosley	Toyota	149	15
23	17	56	Carson Hocevar	Jordan Anderson Racing	Chevrolet	149	14
24	13	15	Anthony Alfredo (R)	DGR-Crosley	Toyota	148	13
25	29	34	Kyle Plott (R)	Reaume Brothers Racing	Toyota	148	12
26	15	17	Tyler Ankrum (R)	DGR-Crosley	Toyota	144	11
27	27	30	Danny Bohn	On Point Motorsports	Toyota	144	10
28	24	3	Jordan Anderson	Jordan Anderson Racing	Chevrolet	120	9
29	22	8	John Hunter Nemechek (i)	NEMCO Motorsports	Chevrolet	108	0
30	31	33	Carson Ware (R)	Reaume Brothers Racing	Toyota	37	7
31	23	19	Derek Kraus	Bill McAnally Racing	Toyota	28	6
32	26	87	Joe Nemechek	NEMCO Motorsports	Chevrolet	11	5

. – Driver advanced to the Championship 4.

. – Driver was eliminated from the playoffs.

Previous race: 2019 NASCAR Hall of Fame 200	NASCAR Gander Outdoors Truck Series; 2019 season	Next race: 2019 Ford EcoBoost 200
