= Kyle Justin =

Kyle Justin may refer to:

- The composer and set designer for the Internet comedy series Angry Video Game Nerd
- Kyle DiFulvio, rock musician who has gone by the name Kyle Justin
