= Carl Larson =

Carl Larson may refer to:

- Carl Larson (basketball) in AAU Men's Basketball All-Americans
- Carl Larson, pen name of George Tuska

== See also ==
- Carl Larsson, Swedish painter
- Carl Larsen (disambiguation)
- Karl Larsen (disambiguation)
- Karl Larsson (disambiguation)
