= Kyle Phillips =

Kyle Phillips may refer to:

- Kyle Phillips (baseball) (born 1984), American baseball player
- Kyle Phillips (American football) (born 1997), American football defensive end
- Kyle Philips (born 1999), American football wide receiver
- Kyle Meredith Phillips Jr. (1934–1988), American historian

== See also ==
- Kyle Phillip (born 1997), Trinidadian cricketer
- Kyler Phillips (born 1995), American mixed martial artist
