= Kyle Spencer =

Kyle Spencer can refer to:

- Kyle Spencer (tennis), British tennis player
- Kyle Spencer (journalist), American author and journalist
- Kyle Spencer, a character from American Horror Story: Coven
