= Kyle Milliken =

American computer hacker and security consultant (born 1989)

- Born: 1989 (age 36–37)
- Occupation: Security Consultant
- Known for: Computer Hacking

Kyle Milliken is an American computer hacker from Sherwood, Arkansas best known for hacking Kickstarter, Disqus, and Imgur for the purpose of sending unsolicited email. Milliken stole data on more than 168 million people. In 2014 the FBI raided his $2 million, 25,000-square-foot estate in the Burbank Hills. He is reported to have earned over $1.4 million between 2010 and 2014. In 2018 he was sentenced to 17 months in a federal work camp. Upon his release, Milliken said he was not interested in returning to a life of crime, but in using his skills for good as a security consultant.
