= Kyle Brown =

Kyle Brown may refer to:

- Kyle Brown (soccer) (born 1983), American soccer player
- Kyle Brown (rugby union, born 1987), South African rugby union sevens player
- Kyle Brown (rugby union, born 2002), New Zealand rugby union player
- Kyle Brown (cricketer) (born 1973), New Zealand cricketer
- Kyle Brown (computer scientist) (born 1967), American computer scientist
- Kyle Brown (politician) (fl. 2022), American politician
- Kyle Brown, Canadian soldier, see Somalia affair
