= Kyle Wilson =

Kyle Wilson may refer to:

- Kyle Wilson (cornerback) (born 1987), American football cornerback
- Kyle Wilson (cricketer) (born 1989), South African cricketer
- Kyle Wilson (English footballer) (born 1985), English footballer
- Kyle Wilson (ice hockey) (born 1984), Canadian ice hockey forward
- Kyle Wilson (linebacker) (born 1995), American football linebacker
