= Kyle Abbott =

Kyle Abbott can refer to:

- Kyle Abbott (baseball) (born 1968), American baseball player
- Kyle Abbott (cricketer) (born 1987), South African cricketer
- Kyle Abbott (The Young and the Restless), a character in The Young and the Restless
