= Kyle MacKinnon =

American ice hockey player (born 1987)

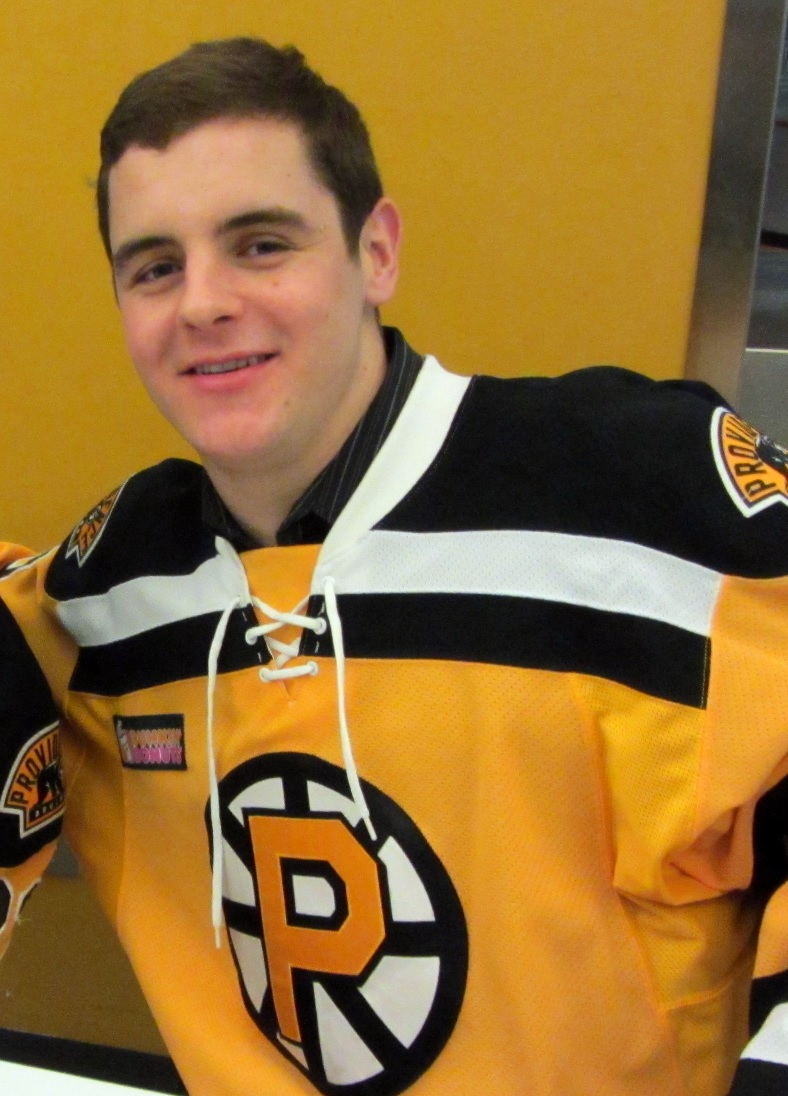
- Born: October 28, 1987 (age 39) Walnut, California, U.S.
- Height: 5 ft 11 in (180 cm)
- Weight: 185 lb (84 kg; 13 st 3 lb)
- Position: Centre
- Shot: Left
- Played for: Providence Bruins; St. John's IceCaps; San Diego Gulls; Straubing Tigers
- NHL draft: Undrafted
- Playing career: 2011–2018

Kyle MacKinnon (born October 28, 1987) is an American former professional ice hockey player who advanced as far as the American Hockey League and the Deutsche Eishockey Liga. He is currently a professional scout with the Detroit Red Wings .

== Playing career ==
MacKinnon attended Providence College where he played four seasons (2007-2011) of college hockey with the NCAA Division I Providence Friars men's ice hockey team, scoring 70 points and registering 79 penalty minutes in 137 career games.

MacKinnon made his professional debut during the 2010–11 season playing in the American Hockey League with the Providence Bruins.

After solidifying his career in the AHL in two seasons with the St. John's IceCaps, MacKinnon signed as a free agent on a two-year contract with his third AHL club, the San Diego Gulls on July 8, 2015.

MacKinnon's tenure with the Gulls was largely interrupted through injury, limiting him to just 32 games over two seasons. On June 7, 2017, MacKinnon left the AHL as a free agent and signed his first contract abroad with German club, Straubing Tigers of the Deutsche Eishockey Liga (DEL), on a one-year agreement.

== Post-playing career ==
On August 16, 2019, MacKinnon was hired by the Detroit Red Wings as a professional scout, a position he has held ever since.

== Career statistics ==
			Regular season					Playoffs
Season	Team	League	GP	G	A	Pts	PIM	GP	G	A	Pts	PIM
2005–06	Chilliwack Chiefs	BCHL	58	19	26	45	63	9	0	5	5	12
2006–07	Langley Chiefs	BCHL	60	33	59	92	63	7	2	5	7	4
2007–08	Providence College	HE	36	5	5	10	8	—	—	—	—	—
2008–09	Providence College	HE	33	6	7	13	8	—	—	—	—	—
2009–10	Providence College	HE	34	12	13	25	39	—	—	—	—	—
2010–11	Providence College	HE	34	14	9	23	24	—	—	—	—	—
2010–11	Providence Bruins	AHL	5	1	2	3	2	—	—	—	—	—
2011–12	Providence Bruins	AHL	67	14	7	21	21	—	—	—	—	—
2011–12	Reading Royals	ECHL	2	0	0	0	2	—	—	—	—	—
2012–13	Providence Bruins	AHL	70	13	15	28	10	12	1	2	3	6
2013–14	St. John's IceCaps	AHL	71	12	27	39	32	21	2	3	5	12
2014–15	St. John's IceCaps	AHL	47	6	21	27	22	—	—	—	—	—
2015–16	San Diego Gulls	AHL	11	3	3	6	0	9	0	2	2	0
2016–17	San Diego Gulls	AHL	21	2	4	6	10	—	—	—	—	—
2017–18	Straubing Tigers	DEL	45	5	14	19	44	—	—	—	—	—
AHL totals			292	51	79	130	97	42	3	7	10	18
