= Kyle Nelson =

Kyle Nelson may refer to:

- Kyle Nelson (American football) (born 1986), American football long snapper
- Kyle Nelson (fighter) (born 1991), Canadian mixed martial artist
- Kyle Nelson (baseball) (born 1996), American baseball pitcher
