= Kyle Wood =

Kyle Wood may refer to:

- Kyle Wood (rugby league) (born 1989), rugby league footballer
- Kyle Wood (ice hockey) (born 1996), Canadian ice hockey defenceman
