= Kyle Mitchell =

American gridiron football player (born 1983)

Profile
- Position: Defensive end

Personal information
- Born: February 7, 1983 (age 43); East Chicago, Indiana
- Listed height: 6 ft 2 in (1.88 m)
- Listed weight: 240 lb (109 kg)

Career information
- College: Indiana State
- NFL draft: 2006: undrafted

Career history
- Saskatchewan Roughriders (2006–2007); BC Lions (2009)*
- * Offseason or practice squad member only

Kyle Mitchell (born February 7, 1983) is a former professional Canadian football defensive end.

He played college football at Indiana State.

He was signed by the Saskatchewan Roughriders as an undrafted free agent in 2006 and played two seasons there, appearing in four games, recording ten tackles, and one fumble recovery. In his 2nd season with the 'Riders; they won the Grey Cup

He was signed by the BC Lions on January 26, 2009, and released at the end of training camp — June 24, 2009.
