= Kyle Helms =

Canadian ice hockey player

- Born: April 21, 1986 (age 38); Cambridge, Ontario, Canada
- Height: 5 ft 7 in (170 cm)
- Weight: 176 lb (80 kg; 12 st 8 lb)
- Position: Left wing
- Shoots: Left
- Oberliga team Former teams: Saale Bulls Halle; EHC München; Augsburger Panther
- NHL draft: Undrafted
- Playing career: 2007–present

Kyle Helms (born April 21, 1986) is a Canadian-German professional ice hockey player. He is currently playing for Saale Bulls Halle in the third German division, the Oberliga.

== Playing career ==
Helms played for the Streetsville Derbys (OPJHL) and the Cambridge Winter Hawks (MWJHL) in his native Canada, before moving to Germany in 2007. After spending the 2007-08 season with EV Landsberg, he joined fellow second-division side EV Ravensburg for the following two season.

He was set to join the Hamburg Freezers of the German top-flight Deutsche Eishockey Liga (DEL) for the 2010-11 campaign, but had his contract terminated before the season due to medical concerns: Helms had sustained a shoulder injury in January 2010. He signed with another DEL team, EHC München, instead and spent the 2010-11 season with the club.

From 2011 to 2013 he played for the Augsburger Panther in the Deutsche Eishockey Liga (DEL). In 2013, he moved to German DEL2 side EC Bad Nauheim, where he spent three years and left at the conclusion of the 2015-16 season. In May 2016, he signed with Heilbronner Falken of the German DEL2. Helms left the Heilbronn side after three years, signing with Oberliga team MEC Halle 04 in April 2019.

== Personal life ==
Helms' father is a native of Hameln, Germany.
