= Kyle Johnson =

Kyle Johnson may refer to:

- Kyle Johnson (American football) (born 1978), American football fullback
- Kyle Johnson (actor) (born 1951), American actor
- Kyle Johnson (basketball) (born 1988), British basketball player
- Kyle Johnson (tennis) (born 1993), American tennis player
- Kyle Johnson, bass player in the progressive metalcore band Misery Signals
