= Kyle Thompson (photographer) =

American photographer (born 1992)

Kyle J Thompson
- Born: January 11, 1992 (age 34); Chicago, Illinois, United States of America
- Occupation: Photographer
- Website: kylethompsonphotography.com

Kyle Thompson (born January 11, 1992) is an American photographer from Chicago, Illinois. His style, as he describes it, is surreal conceptual photography: the creation of a surreal world in order to depict concepts. Thompson specializes in self-portraiture and has a fascination with abandoned houses and empty forests, locations where the majority of his photographs take place.

== Early life ==
Thompson was born January 11, 1992. He has lived in the suburbs of Chicago all his life. His photographs first came to attention through his posts on Reddit, which garnered hundreds of thousands of views.

He has no formal education in photography.

== Style ==
Thompson is renowned for his use of unusual locations. He frequently uses abandoned houses, vacant forests and rivers and lakes. His love of the outdoors sprang from his distaste of the suburbs where he grew up. He has said "the suburbs are a fake and constructed reality."

Thompson's photographs have been called "surrealist and almost dreamlike". He has received attention for his artistic interpretation of the selfie.

== Exhibitions ==
- Ghost Town, One Grand Gallery, Portland, Oregon, February 2015
- Reggia di Caserta, March 2018
