= Kyle Jones =

Kyle Jones may refer to:

- Kyle Jones (politician) (born 1955), musician, archivist and former Maine state politician
- Kyle Jones (Canadian football) (born 1986), Canadian football linebacker
- Kyle Jones (triathlete) (born 1984), Canadian triathlete
- Kyle C. Jones, American voice actor, director, script writer and producer for anime
