= Kyle Chapman =

Kyle Chapman may refer to:

- Kyle Chapman (American activist) (born 1975 or 1976), also known as "Based Stickman", American white nationalist and alt-right activist
- Kyle Chapman (New Zealand activist) (born 1971), New Zealand white nationalist and far-right activist
