= Kyle Ward =

Kyle Ward may refer to:

- Kyle Ward (American football) (born 1984), American football cornerback
- Kyle Ward (musician), musician for the In the Groove series of video games
