= Kyle Davis =

Kyle Davis may refer to:

- Kyle Davis (actor) (born 1978), American actor
- Kyle Davis (American football) (born 1952), former American football center
- Kyle Davis (table tennis) (born 1989), Australian table tennis player
- Kyle Davis (basketball) for Rio Grande Valley Vipers
- Kyle Davis (golfer) in Pennsylvania Open Championship
- Kyle Davis, dancer at the Pacific Northwest Ballet

== See also ==
- Kyle Davies (disambiguation)
