= Kyle Plott =

American racing driver

- Born: Kyle A. Plott; March 8, 1996 (age 30); Marietta, Georgia, U.S.

NASCAR FedEx Freight Truck Series career
- 1 race run over 1 year
- 2019 position: 84th
- Best finish: 84th (2019)
- First race: 2019 Lucas Oil 150 (Phoenix)
Wins	Top tens	Poles
0	0	0
- Statistics up to date as of November 18, 2019.

Kyle A. Plott (born March 8, 1996) is an American professional stock car racing driver. He last competed part-time in the NASCAR Gander Outdoors Truck Series, driving the No. 34 Toyota Tundra for Reaume Brothers Racing.

== Racing career ==
Plott began racing at an early age, doing so in legend cars.

Plott spent the 2018 racing season in the Southern Super Series and CARS Tour. In August and September, he scored his first wins in the two series at Watermelon Capital Speedway and Orange County Speedway, respectively.

In November 2019, Plott joined Reaume Brothers Racing for his NASCAR Gander Outdoors Truck Series debut in the Lucas Oil 150 at ISM Raceway.

== Personal life ==
Plott's younger brother Kason is also a racing driver.

== Motorsports career results ==
=== NASCAR ===
(key) (Bold – Pole position awarded by qualifying time. Italics – Pole position earned by points standings or practice time. * – Most laps led.)

==== Gander Outdoors Truck Series ====
NASCAR Gander Outdoors Truck Series results
Year	Team	No.	Make	1	2	3	4	5	6	7	8	9	10	11	12	13	14	15	16	17	18	19	20	21	22	23	NGOTC	Pts	Ref
2019	Reaume Brothers Racing	34	Toyota	DAY	ATL	LVS	MAR	TEX	DOV	KAN	CLT	TEX	IOW	GTW	CHI	KEN	POC	ELD	MCH	BRI	MSP	LVS	TAL	MAR	PHO; 25	HOM	84th	12	

=== ARCA Racing Series ===
(key) (Bold – Pole position awarded by qualifying time. Italics – Pole position earned by points standings or practice time. * – Most laps led.)

ARCA Racing Series results
Year	Team	No.	Make	1	2	3	4	5	6	7	8	9	10	11	12	13	14	15	16	17	18	19	20	ARSC	Pts	Ref
2016	Goodson Racing Development	1	Ford	DAY	NSH; 29	SLM; 23	TAL	TOL	NJE	POC	MCH	MAD	WIN	IOW	IRP	POC	BLN	ISF	DSF	SLM	CHI	KEN	KAN	94th	200	

=== CARS Late Model Stock Car Tour ===
(key) (Bold – Pole position awarded by qualifying time. Italics – Pole position earned by points standings or practice time. * – Most laps led. ** – All laps led.)

CARS Late Model Stock Car Tour results
Year	Team	No.	Make	1	2	3	4	5	6	7	8	9	10	CLMSCTC	Pts	Ref
2015	Donna Plott	4P	Ford	SNM	ROU	HCY; 11	SNM	TCM	MMS	ROU	CON	MYB	HCY	45th	22	

=== CARS Super Late Model Tour ===
(key)

CARS Super Late Model Tour results
Year	Team	No.	Make	1	2	3	4	5	6	7	8	9	10	11	12	13	CSLMTC	Pts	Ref
2017	N/A	4P	Ford	CON	DOM	DOM	HCY	HCY	BRI; 10	AND; 5	ROU	TCM	ROU	HCY	CON	SBO	N/A	0	
2018	Alan Plott	4	Ford	MYB	NSH	ROU	HCY	BRI	AND; 3	HCY							31st	34	
2018	Alan Plott	4P	Ford								ROU; 1	SBO					31st	34	
2019	Matt Drake	21	Ford	SNM	HCY	NSH	MMS	BRI	HCY	ROU; 12	SBO						36th	21	
2020	Plott Boyz Racing	4	Ford	SNM	HCY	JEN; 11	HCY	FCS	BRI	FLC	NSH						N/A	0	
2021	Alan Plott	4	Ford	HCY	GPS; 9	NSH	JEN	HCY; 5	MMS; 6	TCM; 8	SBO						6th	80	

^{*} Season still in progress
^{1} Ineligible for series points
