= Kyle Miller (golfer) =

Canadian professional golfer (born 1990)

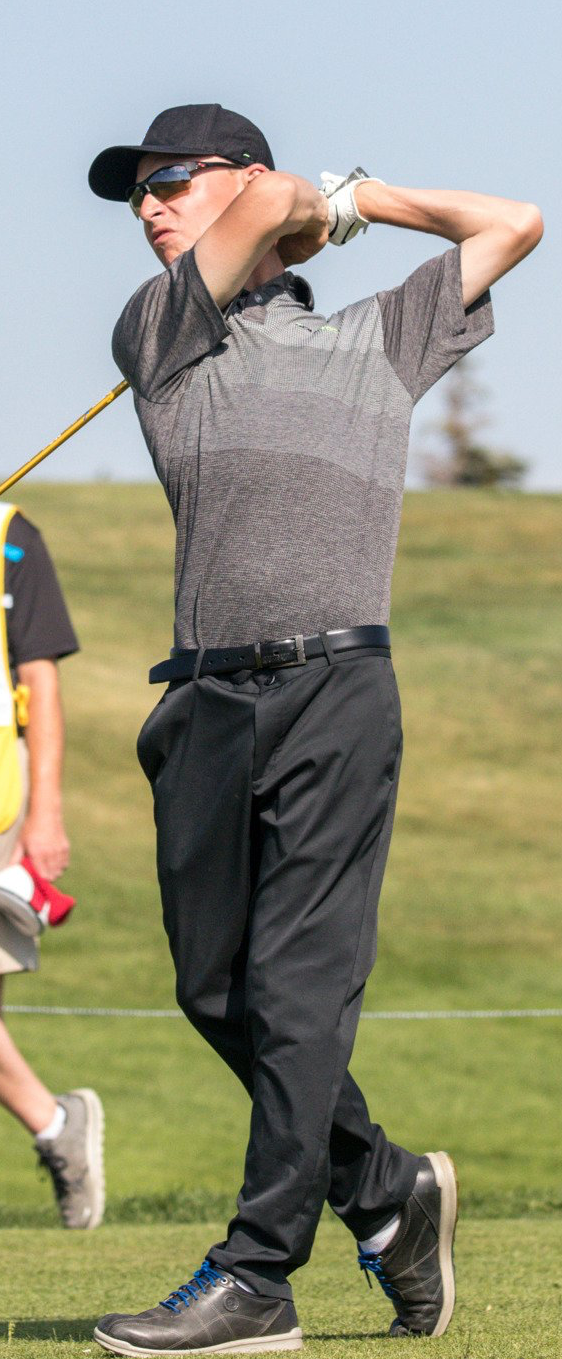
- Kyle at the Mackenzie Tour in August 2017

Personal information
- Full name: Kyle Miller
- Nationality: Canadian
- Born: December 11, 1990 (age 35) Calgary, Alberta
- Height: 5 ft 10 in (178 cm)
- Weight: 155 lb (70 kg)

Career
- Sport: Golf
- Turned professional: 2013

Kyle Miller (born 11 December 1990) is a Canadian professional golfer born in Calgary, Alberta, Canada. He is the first golfer with cerebral palsy to participate in a PGA Tour sanctioned event.

== Early life and golf development ==
Kyle was born a month early and suffered a stroke during birth, causing his cerebral palsy.

From an early age, Miller's left hand was rigidly curled and walking required him to limp on his toes. At the age of 9, Miller and his mother approached the Shriners Hospital for Children to operate on Miller's hand, hoping to straighten it by transferring muscle from the bottom of his wrist to the top. He was very aware that this surgery could mean not waking up, and has stated: "The decision was ultimately mine, and it was with a deep breath I signed the waiver with my good hand." By the time Kyle began playing golf, he had accumulated 14 surgeries, including one to straighten his left leg.

Miller began playing golf while in elementary school. During high school, he would skip classes to go to the driving range. Miller learned much of his ability by shadowing local golfer and coach Marty Desmarais at a local golf club in Calgary.

Miller studied business during university, but dropped out and moved to Florida despite having limited funds in order to pursue his dreams of becoming a professional golfer.

While in Florida, Kyle met fellow Canadian golf instructor Sean Foley. Miller has attributed much of his success to Foley, stating "What Sean has given me is hope and belief", "Here's someone who has become one of the top teachers in the world, and he's telling me I could make it. So why would I doubt myself?"

== Professional career ==
Miller turned professional in 2013 after finishing second in his Play Ability test. Subsequently, he went on to be featured in the Calgary Herald and Golf Digest in October 2013. In 2017, Miller was given a spot in the Mackenzie Tour. In doing so, Miller became the first golfer with Cerebral Palsy to achieve such a feat.

Miller believes that much of his success so far has been due to his disadvantage, and the lack of belief in his ability by his peers. Miller states, "I've been able to teach and inspire countless people with disabilities that achieving your dream is possible, regardless of what people tell you."

== Technique ==
The left half of Miller's body is numb, which means that he cannot feel his weight transfer forward during his downswing. His mobility range through his left hand and left leg are limited.

In regards to his approach, Miller has stated "I've been forced to understand what the body could do, how the body got better and how I'm going to be good. So I think it's an advantage, not a disadvantage".

== Coaching ==
Alongside earning his professional status and competing in various Professional Golf Tour's, Miller has coached at golf's highest level, and has given thousands of lessons in an effort to inspire others to overcome their own obstacles through golf.

Miller has stated "Some guys need to learn how to get knocked down and get back up again, and enjoy it", "There's an art to that. There's a genuine art to thoroughly loving failure. I love it. It's the greatest thing that happened to me. And that's what I want to offer to players."

Miller is a current member of the Canadian Golf Teachers Federation and the World Golf Teachers Federation.

== Charitable efforts ==
Kyle is the spokesman for The Cerebral Palsy Association of Alberta and remains a passionate advocate to those with cerebral palsy and other disabilities. Much of his earnings and fundraising through golf are donated to charity.
