= Kyle Russell =

Kyle Russell may refer to:

- Kyle Russell (baseball) (born 1986), American former baseball player
- Kyle Russell (volleyball) (born 1993), American volleyball player
- Kyle Russell (soccer) (born ?), American college soccer coach
