= Kyle Staver =

American artist

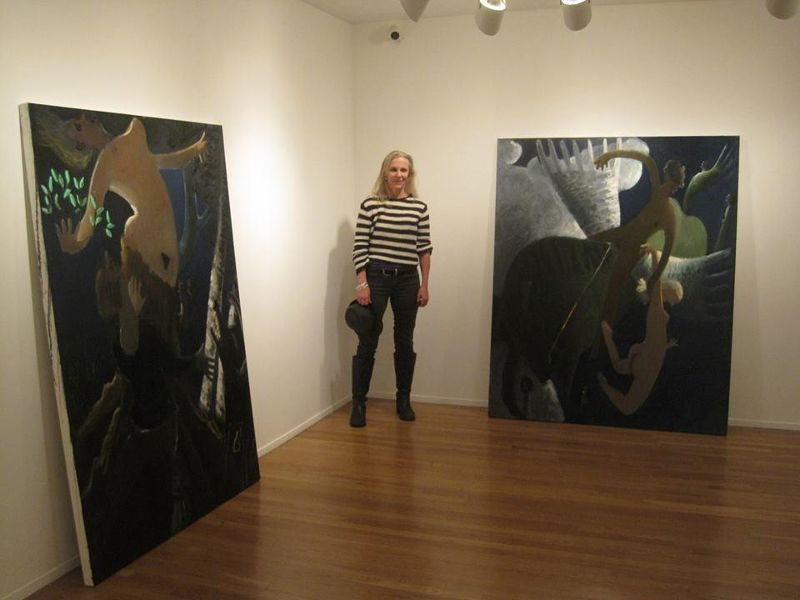
- Born: Minnesota, United States
- Known for: Painting, Sculpture, Ceramics
- Awards: Louis Comfort Tiffany Foundation Award, Benjamin Altman Figure Prize, John Simon Guggenheim Memorial Foundation Fellowship, American Academy of Arts and Letters Purchase Prize

Kyle Staver is an artist who lives in New York City.

== Biography ==
Originally from Minnesota, Kyle Staver settled in New York following graduate studies at Yale University. She has been the recent recipient of a John Simon Guggenheim Memorial Foundation Fellowship (2015) and the American Academy of Arts and Letters Purchase Prize (2015). Staver was also recognized as a distinguished member of the National Academy of New York. Her work has been exhibited in Pennsylvania College of Art & Design, the American Academy of Arts & Letters, the National Academy, Fordham University, and Haverford College. Staver received her BFA from Minneapolis College of Art and Design and a decade later she received her MFA in Painting from Yale University's College of Art.

== Selected exhibitions ==
2023

Kyle Staver and June Leaf Drawings, Steven Harvey Fine Art Projects, New York

Nino Mier Gallery, Brussels

2022 Moskowitz Bayse, Los Angeles Half Gallery, New York

2021 Paper Trails, Steven Harvey Fine Art Projects, New York

2020 Kyle Staver; Zürcher Gallery, New York

2019 Kyle Staver curated by Gwenolee Zürcher, RX Gallery, Paris Kyle Staver; Printed Matters 2001-2018, National Arts Club, New York

2018 Kyle Staver; Zürcher Gallery, New York

2017 Kyle Staver; Ohio State University at Lima, Ohio

2016 Kyle Staver; Kent Fine Art, New York

2015 Tall Tales; Steven Harvey Fine Art Projects, New York

== Selected bibliography ==
- Barry, Mark. “Myth and Magic on the Hudson.” IonArts 2 June 2013. Web.
- Belz, Carl. “Wherefore the Figure, Wherefore the Self.” Left Bank Art Blog 17 May 2012. Web.
- Butler, Sharon. “In Her Own Words: Kyle Staver.” Two Coats of Paint 26 Jan. 2013
- Doubrovskaia, Maria. “Kyle Staver on Myth, Irony and Being a Painter.” Project Inkblot 2013. Web.
- Ebony, David. “Top 10 New York Gallery Shows This Fall,” Artnet News 22 Sept. 2015.
- Einspruch, Franklin. “Hail the High Priestess: Kyle Staver and the Cult of Painting,” Artcritical 28 Sept. 2015.
- Einspruch, Franklin. “Surety and Uncertainty.” The New York Sun 5 Feb. 2013.
- Goodrich, John. “Kyle Staver: Paintings, Prints, Reliefs.” OnViewAt.com 18 Feb. 2013. Web.
- Goodrich, John. “Cozy, Playful and Disciplined.” The New York Sun 12 Jan. 2006.
- Haider, Faheem. “Kyle Staver: Painting in Relief.” Anartism 18 Feb. 2014. Web.
- Johnson, Ken. “The Listings: Kyle Staver.” New York Times 20 Jan 2006.
- Kaczmarczyk, Jeffrey. “Art Prize 2013.” MLive.com 23 Sept. 2013. Web.
- Keeting, Zachary. “Kyle Staver.” Gorky's Granddaughter 9 Dec. 2011. Web.
- Kohler, William Echkardt. “Painting Lives! ‘Mark, Wipes, Scrape, Shape’ at Spaceshifter.” Huffington Post 29 Nov. 2012.
- “Kyle Staver.” ArtPneuma 22 Feb. 2012. Web video.
- Maidman, Daniel. “Theophany: Kyle Staver’s Greek Myth Paintings at Tibor de Nagy Gallery.” Huffington Post 16 Oct. 2013.
- Miller, Chris. “Push Pull Riverside Arts Center.” New City Art 19 June 2012. Web.
- Naves, Mario. “Unabashedly Under the Influence: Powerful Tributes to Precedent.” New York Observer 30 Jan. 2006.
- Naves, Mario. “A Sensation (Minus the Buzz): The Intimate, Acutely Observed.” New York Observer 27 Oct. 2003
- Radell, Thaddeus. “Kyle Staver: Theater of the Odd,” Painting Perceptions 21 Nov. 2013.
- Samet, Jennifer. “Kyle Staver.” Beer with a Painter 9 Feb. 2013. Web.
- Seed, John. “Into the Mythological Zone.” Huffington Post 2 Feb. 2013.
- Seed, John. “A Brother Honored.” Huffington Post 13 Dec. 2011.
- Smith, Roberta. “The Listings: Kyle Staver Recent Works.” New York Times 18 March 2010.
- Smith, Roberta. “A Profusion of Painting, Very Much Alive.” New York Times 10 May 2002.
- The Labletter, 13th Edition 2011.
- Wilkin, Karen. The Hudson Review 2014.
- Wilkin, Karen. “At the Galleries.” The Hudson Review Vol. LXI, No. 1, Spring 2008.
- Yau, John. “Paradise Regained, If Only for the Night,” Hyperallergic 13 Sept. 2015.
- Yau, John. “How to Kiss the Sky: Kyle Staver’s Recent Paintings.” Hyperallergic 27 Oct. 2013.
