= Kyle Smith =

Kyle Smith may refer to:

- Kyle Smith (critic) (born 1966), American critic, novelist, essayist
- Kyle Smith (American football) (born 1984), American football player and executive
- Kyle Smith (basketball) (born 1969), American basketball coach
- Kyle Smith (curler) (born 1992), Scottish curler
- Kyle Smith (motorcyclist) (born 1991), British motorcycle racer
- Kyle Smith (soccer, born 1973), retired American soccer midfielder/defender
- Kyle Smith (soccer, born 1992), American soccer defender
- Kyle Smith (born 1980), American rapper better known as Cecil Otter
