= Kyle Murphy =

Kyle Murphy may refer to:

- Kyle Murphy (cyclist) (born 1991), American cyclist
- Kyle Murphy (soccer) (born 1992), American soccer player
- Kyle Murphy (American football, born 1993), American football offensive tackle
- Kyle Murphy (American football, born 1998), American football offensive tackle
