= Kyle Cheney =

Kyle Cheney may refer to:

- Kyle Cheney (footballer) (born 1989), Australian rules footballer
- Kyle Cheney (journalist), journalist for Politico
