= Kyle Martin =

Kyle Martin may refer to:

- Kyle Martin (first baseman) (born 1992), American baseball first baseman
- Kyle Martin (footballer) (born 1990), Australian rules football player
- Kyle Martin (musician), American musician
- Kyle Martin (pitcher) (born 1991), American baseball pitcher
