= Kyle Swanston =

American basketball player (born 1986)

Personal information
- Born: October 25, 1986 (age 39) Spring Hill, Florida, U.S.
- Listed height: 201 cm (6 ft 7 in)
- Listed weight: 82 kg (181 lb)

Career information
- High school: Worcester Academy (Worcester, Massachusetts)
- College: James Madison (2005–2009)
- NBA draft: 2009: undrafted
- Playing career: 2009–2014
- Position: Forward
- Number: 0

Career history
- 2009–2010: Lapua Korikobrat
- 2010–2011: CB Clavijo
- 2011–2012: Palencia Baloncesto
- 2012: Akita Northern Happinets
- 2012–2013: Kaposvári KK
- 2013–2014: Affrico basket Firenze

Kyle Swanston (born October 24, 1986) is an American former professional basketball player for the Akita Northern Happinets of the Japanese bj league. He played college basketball at James Madison and went undrafted during the 2009 NBA draft.

== Early life ==
Swanston was born in Brooksville, Florida. He was a star basketball player at Worcester Academy, graduating in 2005. He was regarded a 0-star recruit coming out of high school.

He committed to play for James Madison University with interest in 3 other colleges.

Swanston finished 3rd in JMU history for three-pointers made with 206. He led the CAA made in the 2008-2009 season (95). Tied JMU's record for three-pointers made in a single game against Liberty with 9 in the 2008–2009 season.

== College statistics ==
Year	Team	GP	GS	MPG	FG%	3P%	FT%	RPG	APG	SPG	BPG	PPG
2005-06	James Madison	27	14	21.4	.407	.359	.842	2.41	1.04	0.26	0.11	5.85
2006-07	James Madison	30	27	25.1	.408	.350	.667	2.63	1.20	0.57	0.17	6.50
2007-08	James Madison	23	20	27.9	.429	.395	.655	3.57	1.09	0.35	0.26	9.39
2008-09	James Madison	35	29	30.1	.392	.408	.821	3.54	0.97	0.63	0.29	11.57
Career		115	90	26.3	.406	.387	.761	3.04	1.07	0.47	0.21	8.47

== Career statistics ==
Legend
GP	Games played	GS	Games started	MPG	Minutes per game
FG%	Field goal percentage	3P%	3-point field goal percentage	FT%	Free throw percentage
RPG	Rebounds per game	APG	Assists per game	SPG	Steals per game
BPG	Blocks per game	PPG	Points per game	**Bold**	Career high

=== Regular season ===
Year	Team	GP	GS	MPG	FG%	3P%	FT%	RPG	APG	SPG	BPG	PPG
2009-10	Korikobrat	27		34.7	.557	.423	.833	5.4	1.0	0.1	0.2	21.3
2010-11	Clavijo	28		27.8	.466	.372	.691	2.9	1.1	0.3	0.1	13.4
2011-12	Palencia	14	2	19.5	.444	.452	.722	2.21	0.36	0.57	0.29	6.86
2012-13	Akita	21	21	32.5	.337	.286	.802	4.2	2.0	1.0	0.2	19.2
2012-13	Kaposvári	41	41	37.6	.438	.389	.768	4.66	1.51	1.49	0.20	20.24

=== Playoffs ===
Year	Team	GP	GS	MPG	FG%	3P%	FT%	RPG	APG	SPG	BPG	PPG
2011-12	Akita	4		23.0	.294	.222	.923	3.5	1.8	0.5	0.0	9.5
2012-13	Kaposvari	11		38.5	.425	.340	.808	4.5	2.0	1.7	0.2	19.2
