= The Studdogs =

American rock band

- The Studdogs in Kyle Justin's rehearsal space

Background information
- Origin: Orlando, Florida, U.S.
- Genres: Punk rock, rock, blues rock, noise rock, garage rock
- Years active: 2000–2005
- Labels: Orange Recordings; Mutiny Productions
- Past members: Richard Evans; Eric "Red Mouth" Gebhardt; Jeremy Talcott; Jason Testasecca; Kyle Justin; Joe Brooks
- Website: Studdogs @ Orange Recordings site

The Studdogs was an American rock band from Orlando, Florida, United States. The band's music contains elements of punk, blues rock, garage rock, and noise rock. The band was formed in 2000 and stayed active until 2005. They released a lot of material, particularly the album, The Gospel According to the Studdogs and the 7" vinyl three-song EP, and gained local and national notoriety. They were featured in several national music magazines, including Magnet and Amplifier. Comparisons were made to the Stooges, Dead Boys, and it was said they sounded "like absolute victory by way of slurring, Rolling Stones-y garage rock from nowhere in particular." Their drunken, abrasive live shows often ended with someone bleeding or being thrown out of the venue. Their live shows were said to be "what Howling Wolf would sound like through a wall of noise and distortion." The band was signed by Orange Recordings in Los Angeles and toured all over the country, sharing bills with the Demolition Doll Rods, Bob Log III, The Fleshtones, and Immortal Lee County Killers and a one-time show with the Suicide Girls Burlesque Tour in Orlando. While in the Studdogs, Rich Evans began promoting concerts under the tag 'Mutiny Productions'. He now heads the independent Florida's Dying label, promoting and releasing material from the Florida-underground music scene. Kyle Justin joined the band on drums in early 2002 to replace Jason, who was moving to Texas. Kyle vacated his position as drummer in 2003 to pursue a music career in Los Angeles. Eric Gebhardt left the band in 2005 to pursue a solo career under the alias Red Mouth.

== Discography ==
=== Albums ===
- The Gospel According to the Studdogs (2004) – Orange Recordings

=== EPs ===
- Thousands of Degrees Hot! And Not a Drop of Water (2001) – Mutiny Productions
