= Kyle D. Logue =

American legal scholar

Academic background
- Education: Auburn University (BA); Yale University (JD)

Academic work
- Discipline: Private law

Kyle D. Logue is an American legal scholar on private law. He is the Douglas A. Kahn Collegiate Professor of Law at the University of Michigan Law School. He was appointed to serve as interim dean of the Law School effective January 1, 2024, until a permanent dean is appointed. From 2006 to 2016, Logue was the Wade H. and Dores M. McCree Collegiate Professor of Law.

Logue is a leading scholar and teacher in the fields of insurance law, tax law, and torts. Logue uses insights from economics, psychology, and other disciplines to shed light on issues relating to the allocation, regulation, and fair distribution of risk in society. His recent research includes work on how private insurance contracts regulate individual and commercial behavior and on how public law regulates the behavior of insurance companies.

== Career ==
Logue received his B.A., summa cum laude, from Auburn University in Alabama in 1987. He was a Harry S. Truman Scholar and a Phi Kappa Phi Scholar. Logue received his J.D. from Yale Law School, where he was an Olin Scholar in Law and Economics and an articles editor of the Yale Law Journal.

Logue served as a law clerk to Judge Patrick E. Higginbotham of the United States Court of Appeals for the Fifth Circuit before joining the law firm of Sutherland Asbill & Brennan in Atlanta as a tax attorney.

Logue joined the University of Michigan Law School faculty in 1993 and received tenure in 1998. Logue served as Michigan Law's associate dean for academic affairs from 2006 to 2008. He has taught courses in corporate and individual income tax, torts, tax policy, insurance, distributive justice, costs and benefits, asbestos liability, and other subjects.

Logue is highly cited in the area of tax law. The U.S. Supreme Court cited Logue on the transition effects of changes to the Internal Revenue Code in United States v. Winstar Corp. (1996). Logue has published important articles in a number of fields, including torts, insurance, and tax. He has co-written articles with many famous legal and policy scholars, including Kenneth S. Abraham, Ronen Avraham, Tom Baker, Omri Ben-Shahar, David F. Bradford, Jon D. Hanson, Saul Levmore, Daniel Schwarcz, and Joel Slemrod. Logue's work has appeared in various law journals, including the Michigan Law Review, the University of Chicago Law Review, the Cornell Law Review, the Tax Law Review, the Virginia Law Review, and the Yale Law Journal.

Logue was, along with Erwin Chemerinsky and David F. Levi, a finalist for the post of Duke University School of Law dean in 2006-2007; Levi was named to the position.

Logue is a member of the American Law Institute and has been the associate reporter of the ALI Principles of Liability Insurance Project since 2010. He is also the Chair-Elect of the Association of American Law Schools Section on Insurance Law.
