= Kyle Meredith Phillips Jr. =

American Etruscologist (1934–1988)

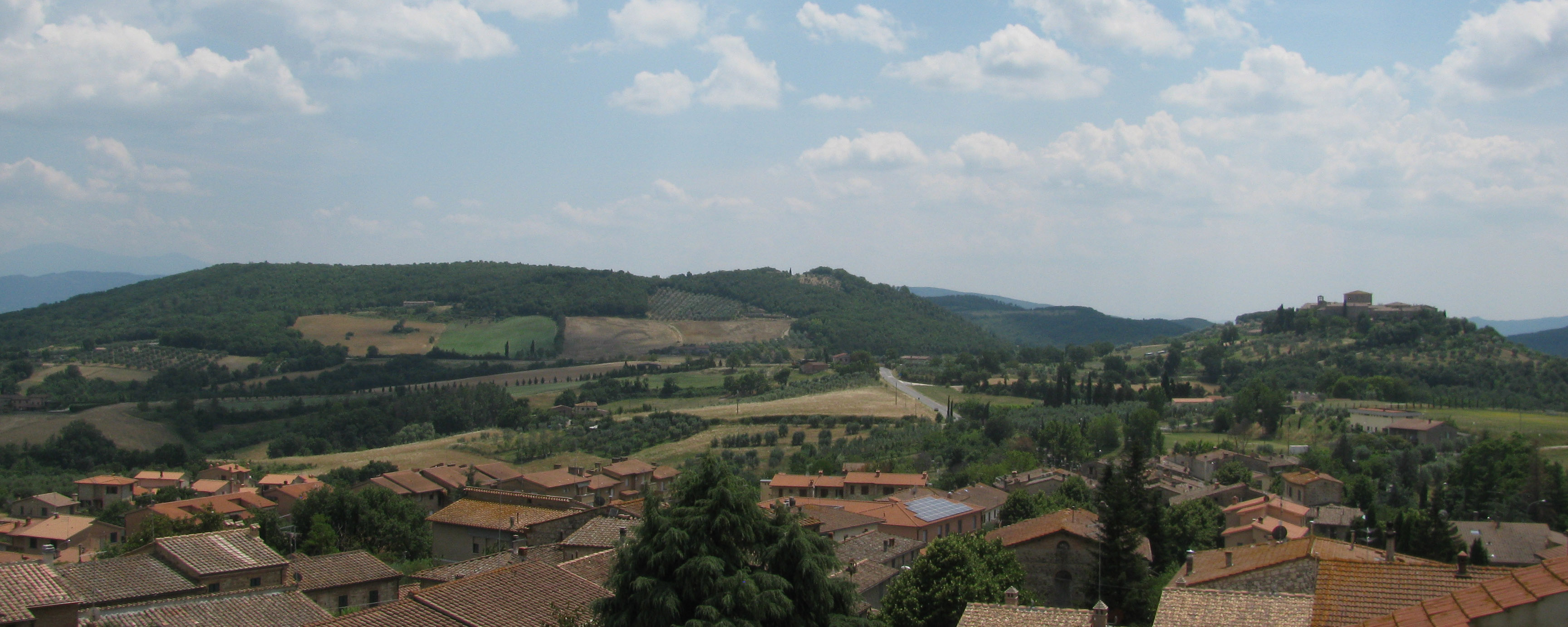
Poggio Civitate and Murlo

Kyle Meredith Phillips Jr. (May 20, 1934, Cabot, Vermont – August 7, 1988, Bryn Mawr, Pennsylvania) was a leading American Etruscologist.

Phillips was educated at Bowdoin College (A.B. cum laude 1956) and Princeton University (M.A. 1959, Ph.D. 1962). At Princeton he studied with Erik Sjöqvist. In 1962 he joined the faculty of Bryn Mawr College. Having excavated with the Princeton team at Morgantina in Sicily, Phillips decided to start a new project. Based on advice from Ranuccio Bianchi Bandinelli, Phillips embarked on the excavation of an Etruscan center at Poggio Civitate near Murlo, Siena in 1966. Here Phillips discovered a monumental complex whose interpretation remains controversial, despite ongoing fieldwork. From 1973 he was joined by his student Erik Nielsen in directing the project. In 1994 a monograph entitled Murlo and the Etruscans. Art and society in Ancient Etruria appeared in Phillips's honor. The book, which has many contributions by Etruscologists, includes a list of his publications and a posthumously published article.

== Selected works ==
- Ashmead, Ann Harnwell; Phillips, Kyle Meredith (1971). The Ella Riegel Memorial Museum, Bryn Mawr College. Corpus Vasorum Antiquorum. [United States of America]. Vol. 13. ISBN 0-691-03535-0.
- Ashmead, Ann Harnwell; Phillips, Kyle Meredith (1976). Classical Vases : Excluding Attic Black-Figure, Attic Red-Figure and Attic White Ground, Catalogue of the Classical Collection, Museum of Art Rhode Island School of Design. LCCN 76-45537. OCLC 3425876.
- The Barberini mosaic: sunt hominum animaliumque complures imagines. 1981.
- In the Hills of Tuscany: Recent Excavations at the Etruscan Site of Poggio Civitate (Murlo, Siena). 1993.

== Necrology ==
- De Puma, Richard D., Ingrid E. M. Edlund-Berry, and Lucy Shoe Meritt. "Kyle Meredith Phillips, Jr., 1934-1988." American Journal of Archaeology 93, no. 2 (1989): 239-40. Accessed April 5, 2021. http://www.jstor.org/stable/505091.
