= Kyle Davies =

Kyle Davies may refer to:

- Kyle Davies (baseball) (born 1983), American baseball pitcher
- Kyle Davies (soccer) (born 1989), American soccer player
- Kyle Davies, a founder of cryptocurrency hedge fund Three Arrows Capital

== See also ==
- Kylie Davies
- Kyle Davis (disambiguation)
- Carl Davies, British biathlete
