= Kyle Williams =

Kyle Williams may refer to:

- Kyle Williams (defensive tackle) (born 1983), American football defensive tackle
- Kyle Williams (offensive tackle) (born 1984), American football offensive tackle
- Kyle Williams (footballer) (born 1987), association football player
- Kyle Williams (wide receiver, born 1988), American football wide receiver
- Kyle Williams (wide receiver, born 2002), American football wide receiver
- Kyle Williams, character in Legion (2010 film)

== See also ==
- Kylie Williams (disambiguation)
