= Kyle Snyder =

Kyle Snyder may refer to:

- Kyle Snyder (baseball) (born 1977), Major League Baseball relief pitcher
- Kyle Snyder (soldier) (born 1983), United States Army soldier and conscientious objector
- Kyle Snyder (wrestler) (born 1995), American freestyle wrestler
