= Kyle J. Myers =

- Education: University of Arizona (PhD); Occidental College (BS)
- Known for: Medical imaging Diagnostics
- Scientific career
- Workplaces: Food and Drug Administration

Kyle J. Myers is the Director of Imaging and Applied Mathematics at the Food and Drug Administration Centre for Devices and Radiological Health. She is a Fellow of the Optical Society and SPIE.

== Early life and education ==
Myers was inspired to study physics by her father, who was an engineer. Myers studied physics and mathematics at Occidental College and graduated in 1980. She moved to University of Arizona for her graduate studies, and earned a PhD in optical science in 1985. She was supervised by Harrison Hooker Barrett. She stayed at the University of Arizona for a postdoctoral fellowship until 1987.

== Research and career ==
Myers joined the Food and Drug Administration in 1987. Myers' book Foundations of Image Science was selected as The Optical Society Joseph W. Goodman Book Writing Award winner in 2006. In 2014 Myers was appointed as the Director of the Division of Imaging, Diagnostics, and Software Reliability. She is interested in next-generation screening techniques, medical diagnosis and 3D imaging. These include imaging breast tissue for the visualisation of abnormalities, as well as diagnosing Alzheimer's and Parkinson's disease. 3D imaging, such as tomosynthesis, 3D ultrasound and breast CT scans offer improved sensitivity over 2D screening methods such as mammography. In her capacity at the Food and Drug Administration Myers is involved with the regulation and approval of new technologies, which includes approving the first dedicated breast CT system (2012) and breast ultrasound (2014).

=== Academic service and honours ===
In 2012 Myers was elected University of Arizona College of Optical Sciences Alumna of the Year. She was a finalist in the Service to America Medals in 2012. Myers has been involved different initiatives to promote gender equality in science. In 2014 she was featured in the SPIE Women in Optics planner, which is produced annually and distributed to college and high school students. She was elected to the National Academy of Engineering in 2015. She serves on the Steering Committee of the Medical Device Innovation Consortium. She is a Fellow of the American Institute for Medical and Biological Engineering, The Optical Society and SPIE. Myers is a member of the Board of Directors of SPIE from 2018 to 2020.

=== Selected publications ===
Her publications include;

- Myers, Kyle J. (2003). Foundations of Imaging Science. Wiley-Interscience. ISBN 978-0471153009.
- Myers, Kyle J. (1993). "Model observers for assessment of image quality". PNAS. 1993 (21): 9758–9765. Bibcode:1993PNAS...90.9758B. doi:10.1073/pnas.90.21.9758. PMC 47653. PMID 8234311.
- Myers, Kyle J. (1987). "Addition of a channel mechanism to the ideal-observer model". Journal of the Optical Society of America A. 4 (12): 2447–2457. Bibcode:1987JOSAA...4.2447M. doi:10.1364/JOSAA.4.002447. PMID 3430229.
