= Kyle Schuneman =

Kyle Schuneman (born Chicago, Illinois) is an American interior designer, author and television personality. He wrote the book, "The First Apartment Book: Cool Design for Small Spaces" that was published by Clarkson Potter on August 28, 2012. He runs the design firm, Kyle Schuneman Designs, in Los Angeles that handles interior design, art directing, and product design. Kyle first rose to fame doing design segments for the Los Angeles morning show, "The KTLA Morning Show", which turned into a design career specializing in small spaces.

He has been named on House Beautiful's "Next Wave" list, Refinery 29's "30 under 30" list, and a "Tastemaker" by Los Angeles Magazine. His work has also appeared in Esquire, Dwell, Cosmopolitan, This Old House, Redbook, Sunset, HGTV Magazine, The Chicago Tribune, Real Simple, Angeleno Interiors, and L'Uomo Vogue. Kyle also wrote the former Los Angeles Times column, "The Apt. Life" following the success of his book.

His art directing work includes the Emmy-winning Food Network show, "Giada At Home", and the Style Network show, "Peter Perfect", as well as print work for Target, CB2, Martha Stewart, JCP, Vizio, Microsoft, and QVC.

Kyle released his first upholstery line in January 2014. The line aimed at urban apartment-dwellers was in collaboration with the online retailer Apt2B. The debut line consisted of 16 pieces including chairs, sofas, and sectionals. The line, Kyle Schuneman for Apt2B, eventually grew to 3 collections and 90 pieces.
