= Kyle Larson (disambiguation) =

Kyle Larson (born 1992) is an American racing driver.

Kyle Larson may also refer to:

- Kyle Larson Racing, Larson's dirt racing team
- Kyle Larson vs. The Double, 2026 documentary by Amazon Prime Video surrounding Larson's attempts at The Double in 2024 and 2025.

== Other uses ==
- Kyle Larson (American football) (born 1980), American football punter
- Kyle Larson, participated in Rowing at the 2008 Summer Olympics – Qualification

== See also ==
- Kyle Larsen (1950–2012), American contract bridge player
- Larson (surname)
