= Kyle Uyehara =

American speed skater

Kyle Uyehara (born November 27, 1989, in Whittier, California) is a U.S. short track speed skater.

== Early career ==
Uyehara started his speed skating career in Lakewood, California, then moved to Marquette, Michigan, to train with the USOEC from 2006 to 2008. In 2015 Uyehara joined the U.S national short track team, training at the Utah Olympic Oval.

Some highlights of his career include:

- 2008 North American Champion
- 2008 World Junior Championships team member (7th overall)
- 2008 American cup series junior champion
- 2010–11 World Cup team member
  - Won a silver medal with the team at World Cup 3 in Changchun, China at the men's relay
