= Kyle DiFulvio =

American singer–songwriter and musician

- Kyle DiFulvio performing live with Skeleteen

Background information
- Also known as: Kyle Hamm, Kyle Lime, Kyle Justin, Kyle DeFluzio
- Born: May 18, 1975 (age 51); Johnson City, New York, U.S.
- Origin: Orlando, Florida
- Genres: Alternative rock, indie rock, hard rock, noise rock
- Instruments: Guitar, vocals, bass guitar, drums
- Years active: 1987–present
- Website: www.wearehalt.com www.skeleteen.com

Kyle DiFulvio (born May 18, 1975) is an American singer–songwriter and musician. He is noted for his work in American rock bands Scarling., The Studdogs, and Skeleteen.

== Musical career ==
Currently, Kyle is guitarist and singer of Los Angeles–based rock band HALT, a band formed with Skeleteen co-founder Cheryl Lyndsey. Kyle is best known as a member of the Los Angeles–based noise rock band Scarling. and the Orlando, Florida–based punk rock band The Studdogs. He is noted for fronting the rock band Skeleteen. He began his music career in the mid-1990s in Orlando as a singer–songwriter and live drummer in glam punk band Dirty Barby. He played drums for punk band The UV's, leading to his appearance in the film Devil Girl with that group.

=== Skeleteen 2002–2010 ===
Kyle served as singer-songwriter of Skeleteen, an American rock band from Los Angeles. Kyle initially formed Skeleteen in Orlando, Florida with Cheryl Lyndsey in 2002. Skeleteen's style of rock music was categorized as noise rock and experimental rock. They released one EP and one mini-album via independent record label Future Static.

=== Dirty Barby 1996–2003 ===
Kyle served as songwriter, multi-instrumentalist, and live drummer for glam punk band Dirty Barby in the mid-1990s. He cited several Seattle sound and early-1990s punk rock bands for inspiring the formation of Dirty Barby.

Dirty Barby were noted for their onstage behavior. In 2001, Orlando Weekly reported, "the group's performances often turn into raging band vs. audience battles that border on out-and-out brawls." The film Vampire Clan featured the Dirty Barby song Nothing's Real, credited to Kyle Justin. The film was based on the 1996 "vampire cult killings" that occurred in Central Florida.

Kyle Lime, Scarling. live at Curiosa (Los Angeles), 2004

=== Scarling. 2003–2004 ===
Kyle was bassist for the Los Angeles–based rock band Scarling. He went by the alias Kyle Lime during his stint in the band. In August 2004, Scarling was an opening act on The Cure's Curiosa Festival tour. After the tour, he vacated his position in Scarling to pursue songwriting in Skeleteen.

=== The Studdogs 2002–2003 ===
Kyle was live drummer for the Orlando, Florida–based punk rock band The Studdogs for a short time. He left the band due to his move to Los Angeles.

=== The UV's 2004–2005 ===
In 2004, Kyle played drums for Los Angeles–based punk rock band The UV's. They filmed a live scene for the independent film Devil Girl. For this film, he is credited under the alias Kyle DeFluzio.

== Ladyfest Orlando ==
In a 2002 interview, Kyle described himself as "a longtime feminist." Kyle led the organization of Ladyfest Orlando after reading a Bust Magazine article about the original Ladyfest that occurred in Olympia, Washington in 2000. He curated the event on September 29, 2002, which featured over 30 female musicians, spoken word, visual and performance artists. The proceeds were donated to a number of local women's charitable organizations. An article in Orlando Weekly praised him as the only known male to have curated such an event.

== Discography ==
With Skeleteen:

- Sorry for Everything (2003, DB Records)
- Bury the Seasons (2006, independent release)
- No Fun Intended (2009, Future Static)
- Bury the Seasons remastered + bonus tracks (2009, Future Static)

With Scarling

- Crispin Glover (2004, Sympathy for the Record Industry)

With Dirty Barby:

- Sleep When I'm Dead (2000, DB Records)

== Soundtracks ==
Film	Song	Performer	Credit	Year
Vampire Clan	"Nothing's Real"	Dirty Barby	Kyle Justin	2002
Grindhouse Massacre	"Falter"	Skeleteen	Kyle DiFulvio	2007

== Filmography ==
- Devil Girl (2007), as The UV's drummer, credited as Kyle DeFluzio
- Janeane from Des Moines (2012), as gay bar patron, credited as Kyle DiFulvio
