= Kyle Spencer (journalist) =

American journalist

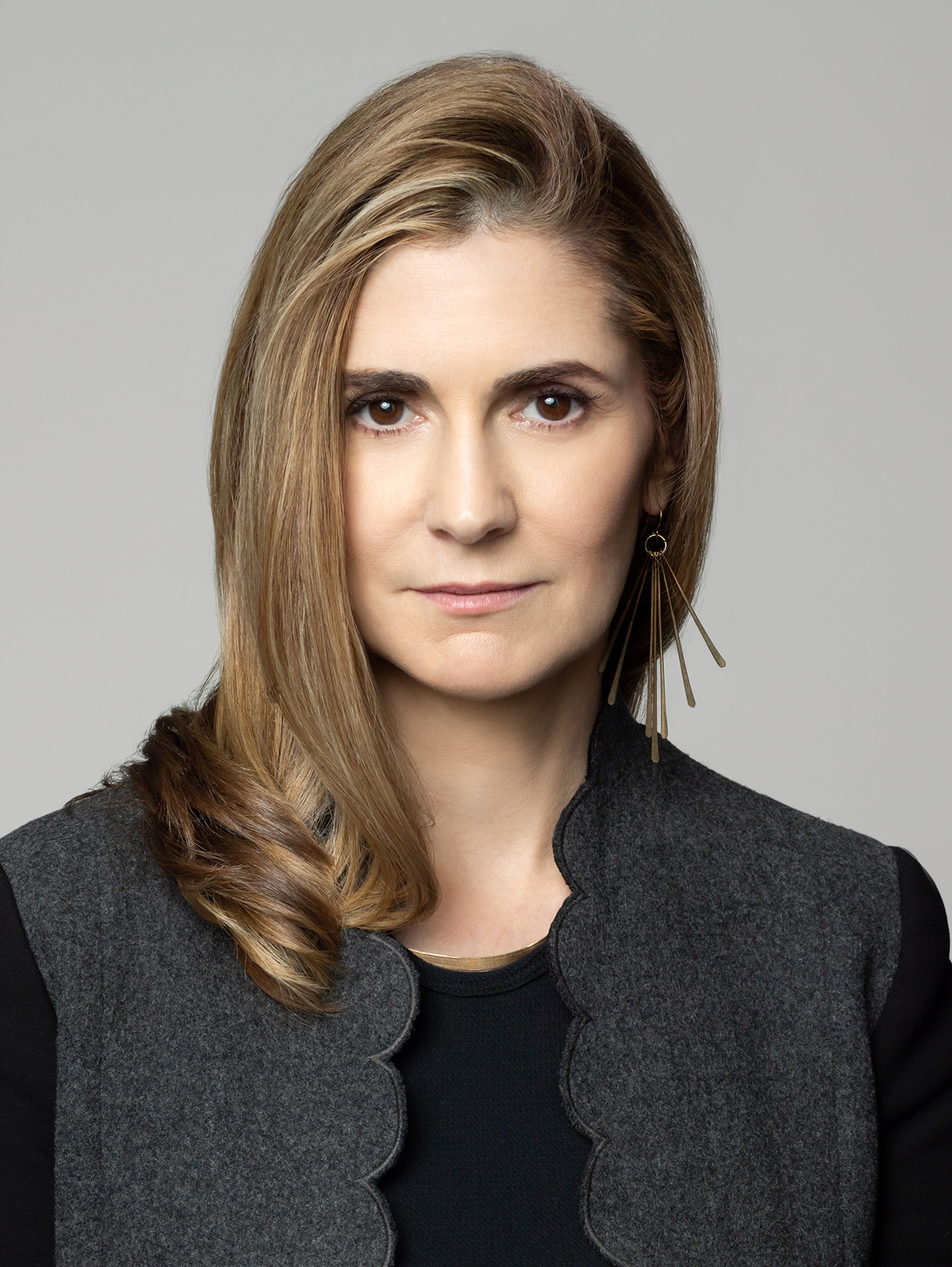
Kyle Spencer

Kyle Spencer is an American author and journalist who primarily writes about education. A frequent New York Times contributor since 2012, Spencer began reporting on how far-right groups are targeting US college students to form a conservative youth movement in 2018.

Her reporting led to the book Raising Them Right: The Untold Story of America's Ultraconservative Youth Movement and Its Plot for Power, published by HarperCollins in 2022, which focuses on such figures as Turning Point USA founder Charlie Kirk and conservative commentator Candace Owens. The book showed how the groups "use social media, flashy trips to conservative conferences in vacation hotspots, celebrity conservatives, and wedge issues" to draw in young people. Spencer found that the movement was a "reaction to Obama-ism," with Kirk and others inspired by President Barack Obama's use of social media while also responding to his policies.

She also reported that conservative donors spend more than three times as much on youth education and activism every year as their liberal counterparts.

== Life and career ==
Spencer has written for The Washington Post, The Atlantic, The Baltimore Sun, The Daily Beast, The International Herald Tribune, New York magazine, Slate, The Philadelphia Inquirer and Politico magazine, among other publications. From 2012 to 2020, she covered education for the New York Times.

In 2014 she co-produced a Frontline episode about a school district resegregation plan in Baton Rouge, Louisiana, that won the EWA Broadcast Award.

Spencer's previous book, She's Gone Country, was a memoir about her time working as a journalist in North Carolina.
