= Kyle Landas =

American craftsperson (born 1979)

- Born: January 8, 1979 (age 46); Iowa City, Iowa, United States
- Known for: Leatherwork
- Patrons: Zac Brown, Hank Williams, Jr., Brad Paisley, Jerrod Niemann, Willie Nelson
- Website: www.sandmancollection.com

Kyle Landas (born January 8, 1979, in Iowa City, Iowa) is an American craftsperson who typically works in leather. Landas has created album artwork for chart topping artists, their guitar straps and fashion pieces such as vests that Landas has created have been used in music videos, music awards and the Country Music Hall of Fame. He has also created works of art for large corporations.

Landas was Zac Brown's (Zac Brown Band) personal leather artist from 2010 to 2012 and has created guitar straps and fine leather art for musicians such as Hank Williams, Jr., Brad Paisley, Jerrod Niemann, and Willie Nelson.

Landas is an amateur artist with no formal training. Originally a bricklayer by profession, he turned to leather work when a painful condition meant he could no longer do heavy work.
