= Kyle (surname) =

Origin
- Origin: Scottish

Kyle is a surname of Scottish origin.

== Etymology ==
The surname is derived from a placename, likely from Gaelic caol "narrow, strait" but there are other possible derivations.

The name of the Kyle District itself is traditionally attributed to the legendary king Coel Hen (there are actually no narrows or straights in Ayrshire's Kyle District; cf. Coylton).

On the geographical origin of those bearing the surname Kyle, by 1881 it occurred most densely in the county of Berwickshire, followed by Dumfries.

== People ==
- Aaron Kyle (born 1954), American football player
- Alex Kyle (1907–1990), Scottish amateur golfer
- Alexandra Kyle (born 1988), American actress
- Andrew Kyle (born 1978), Northern Irish lawn and indoor bowler
- Andy Kyle (Andrew Ewing Kyle) (1889–1971), Canadian baseball and ice hockey player
- Anne Dempster Kyle (1896–1966), American children's writer
- Archie Kyle (1883–1957), Scottish football player
- Aryn Kyle (born 1978), American novelist and short story writer
- Barbara Kyle (1909–1966), English librarian and information scientist
- Barry Kyle (born 1947), English theatre director
- Beatrice Kyle (1902–1970), American high diver
- Ben Kyle (born 1981), Irish-American singer-songwriter and musician
- Benjaman Kyle (born 1948), pseudonymous American with retrograde amnesia
- Bert Kyle (1873–1955), New Zealand politician
- Bill Kyle (William Miller Kyle) (1924–1968), Canadian ice hockey player
- Billy Kyle (1914–1966), American jazz pianist
- Bob Kyle (1870–1941), Irish association football manager
- Bruce Kyle (born 1969), American politician and judge from Florida
- Chris Kyle (1974–2013), United States Navy SEAL
- Christiane Jacox Kyle (born 1950), American poet
- Chuck Kyle (born 1950), American football coach and schoolteacher
- Chuck Kyle (American football) (Charles Douglas Kyle) (born 1947), American football player
- Cicely Kyle (born 1984), American weightlifter
- Craig Kyle (born 1971), American comics writer
- Dallas Kyle, American swimmer
- Danny Kyle (1939–1998), Scottish folk singer-songwriter
- Darwin K. Kyle (1918–1951), United States Army officer
- David Kyle (1919–2016), American science fiction writer
- Doug Kyle (1932–2023), Canadian long-distance runner and coach
- Duncan Kyle, pseudonym of John Franklin Broxholme (1930–2000), English thriller writer
- Edwin Jackson Kyle (1876–1963), American diplomat
- Elisabeth Kyle, pseudonym of Agnes Mary Robertson Dunlop (1901–1982), Scottish journalist and writer
- Euan Kyle (born 1997), Scottish curler
- Fergus Kyle (1834–1906), American farmer and politician from Texas
- Frances Kyle (1893–1958), Northern Irish barrister
- Frank Kyle (1882–1929), American college football player and coach
- George Kyle (1908–1998), Scottish footballer
- Georgina Moutray Kyle (1865–1950), Northern Ireland painter
- Gibson Kyle (1820–1903), English architect
- Gunhild Kyle (1921–2016), Swedish historian
- Gus Kyle (1923–1996), Canadian ice hockey player
- Harry Macdonald Kyle (1872–1951), Scottish ichthyologist and pioneer of fisheries science
- Hedi Kyle (born 1937), German-American book artist and educator
- Howard Kyle (1861–1950), American actor and lecturer
- Iris Kyle (born 1974), American bodybuilder
- Jack Kyle (1926–2014), Irish rugby union footballer
- Jada Kyle, Australian beauty pageant titleholder
- James Kyle (bishop) (1788–1869), Scottish Roman Catholic bishop
- James Kyle (cricketer) (1879–1919), Australian cricketer
- James H. Kyle (1854–1901), American politician
- Jason Kyle (born 1972), American football player
- Jason Kyle (politician), American engineer and politician from Utah
- Jayanthi Kyle (born c.1979), American gospel and soul singer-songwriter
- Jeremy Kyle (born 1965), British TV and radio presenter
- Jim Kyle (born 1950), American lawyer and politician from Tennessee
- John Kyle (Northern Ireland politician) (born 1952), Northern Irish politician and physician
- John C. Kyle (1851–1913), American attorney and politician from Mississippi
- John Joseph Jolly Kyle (1838–1922), Scottish-born Argentine chemist
- John W. Kyle (1891–1965), American politician and judge from Mississippi
- Johnny Kyle (1898–1974), American football player
- Jonathan Kyle (born 1982), American politician from West Virginia
- Jordan Kyle, American music producer, songwriter and sound engineer
- Joseph Kyle (1913–1962), Scottish footballer
- Kaylyn Kyle (born 1988), Canadian soccer player
- Keith Kyle (1925–2007), British writer, broadcaster and historian
- Kevin Kyle (born 1981), Scottish footballer
- Killer Kyle, ring name of American professional wrestler Mark Kyle
- Léa Kyle (born 1995), French magician
- Louisa Venable Kyle (1903–1999), American historian, author and journalist
- Maeve Kyle (1928–2025), Irish track athlete and field hockey player
- Mark Kyle (equestrian) (born 1973), Irish eventing rider
- Maurice Kyle (1937–1981), English footballer
- Mike Kyle (born 1980), American mixed martial artist and boxer
- Mollie Kyle (1886–1937), American Osage woman
- Patrick J. Kyle (1854–1929), United States Navy sailor
- Penelope W. Kyle, American college president
- Peter Kyle (born 1970), British politician
- Peter Kyle (footballer) (1878–1957), Scottish footballer
- Ranz Kyle (born 1997), Filipino actor, dancer and singer
- Redvers Kyle (1929–2015), South African-British broadcaster, actor and composer
- Richard Kyle (politician) (born 1960), American politician from Arizona
- Richard G. Kyle, American academic, theologian and author
- Richard H. Kyle (1937–2021), American judge from Minnesota
- Robert Kyle (American football) (1913–2010), American football and minor league baseball player
- Robert A. Kyle, American medical academic
- Roberto Kyle, South African actor and vocalist
- Roy Kyle (1897–1996), Australian soldier and diarist
- Sam Kyle (1884–1962), Irish trade unionist and politician
- Samuel Kyle (bishop) (1770–1848), Church of Ireland bishop
- Samuel Kyle (priest) (1801–1890), Church of Ireland archdeacon
- Sara Kyle (born 1952), American attorney and politician
- Scott Kyle (born 1983), Scottish actor
- Sissela Kyle (born 1957), Swedish actress, theater director and comedian
- Syafiq Kyle (born 1992), Malaysian actor
- Syd Kyle-Little (1918–2012), Australian army officer and businessman
- Taya Kyle (born 1974), American author, political commentator and activist
- Thomas B. Kyle (1856–1915), American lawyer and politician from Ohio
- Tom Kyle (born 1959), Australian wheelchair basketball coach
- Wallace Kyle (1910–1988), Australian Royal Air Force commander and Governor of Western Australia
- Walt Kyle (born 1956), American ice hockey coach
- Willie Kyle (1881–1959), Scottish rugby union footballer
- Wood B. Kyle (1915–2000), United States Marine Corp officer

== Fictional characters ==
- Benjamin Kyle (Babylon 5), TV series character
- Selina Kyle, better known as Catwoman

== See also ==
- Kile (surname)
- Kyl (disambiguation)
