= Keel (disambiguation) =

A keel is the central beam of the hull of a boat.

Keel may also refer to:

== Art, entertainment and media ==
- Keel (band), heavy metal group in the 1980s
  - Keel (album)
- KEEL, AM radio station in Shreveport, Louisiana
- Keel Lorenz, a character in Neon Genesis Evangelion

== Biology ==
- Keel (bird anatomy), a perpendicular extension of a bird's breastbone, to which wing muscles anchor
- Keel (slug), a morphological feature on the back of some slugs
- Caudal keel, in fish
- Keeled scales, reptile scales that have a ridge down the center, rather than being smooth
- Sagittal keel, a feature of the human skull
- Keel (botany), a ridge on the petals of a flower

== Boats ==
- Humber Keel, a type of boat used on the Humber Estuary in England
- Keelboat or "keel", a flat-bottomed boat designed for use on rivers

== People ==
- Keel (surname), includes a list of notable people with this surname
- Keel Watson (1964–2023), British opera singer

== Places ==
- Keel, County Mayo, town on Achill Island, Ireland
- Keel, a parish of Castlemaine, County Kerry, Ireland
- Keel Creek Bridge, a road bridge near Coalgate, Oklahoma, U.S.
- Keel Island, an island off the Antarctica coast
- Keel Mountain (disambiguation)

== Other uses ==
- Keel (unit), a measure of coal in North East England
- Studio Keel, Serbian swimwear company specializing in water polo

== See also ==
- Keal (disambiguation)
- Keeill, a Manx Gaelic word for a chapel
- Keele (disambiguation)
- Keels (disambiguation)
- Keely (disambiguation)
- Kiel (disambiguation)
- Kil (disambiguation)
- Kile (disambiguation)
- Kill (disambiguation)
- Kyl (disambiguation)
- Kyle (disambiguation)
- Kyll, a river in western Germany
