= Keele (disambiguation) =

Keele is a village in Staffordshire, England.

Keele may also refer to:

== Britain ==
- Keele (ward), a local council ward in the borough of Newcastle-under-Lyme
- Keele University

== Canada ==
=== Toronto ===
- Keele Street, Toronto
  - Keele station, a Toronto subway station sited on the street
  - Keelesdale station, an under-construction Toronto subway station sited on the street intersection

=== Northwest Territories ===
- Keele River, a tributary of the Mackenzie River

== People ==
- Thomas Keele (disambiguation)

== See also ==
- Keal (disambiguation)
- Keel (disambiguation)
- Kiel (disambiguation)
- Kil (disambiguation)
- Kile (disambiguation)
- Kill (disambiguation)
- Kyl (disambiguation)
- Kyle (disambiguation)
- Kyll
