= KILE =

Kile or KILE may refer to:

- Darryl Kile, a Major League Baseball player
- Kile, a TeX/LaTeX text editor
- Kile, Warmian-Masurian Voivodeship, Poland
- Kile (surname)
- Kile (unit), an Ottoman unit of volume
- KWCC-FM, a radio station (89.5 FM) licensed to serve Woodland Park, Colorado, United States, which held the call sign KILE-FM from 2008 to 2017
- Skylark Field, the airport serving Killeen, Texas, United States, assigned ICAO code KILE
- KGOW, a radio station (1560 AM) licensed to Bellaire, Texas, United States, assigned call sign KILE from 1996 to 2007

== See also ==
- Keal (disambiguation)
- Keel (disambiguation)
- Keele (disambiguation)
- Kiel (disambiguation)
- Kil (disambiguation)
- Kill (disambiguation)
- Kyl (disambiguation)
- Kyle (disambiguation)
- Kyll
