= Keal =

Keal may refer to:

== People with the name ==
- Clifford Keal (1901–1965), Australian rules footballer
- Minna Keal (1909–1999), British composer
- Keal Carlile (born 1990), English rugby league player

== Places ==
- Keal Cotes, a village in England
- East Keal, a village in England

== Other uses ==
- KEAL, a radio station of California

== See also ==
- Keel (disambiguation)
- Keele (disambiguation)
- Kiel (disambiguation)
- Kil (disambiguation)
- Kile (disambiguation)
- Kill (disambiguation)
- Kyl (disambiguation)
- Kyle (disambiguation)
- Kyll
