= Kiel (disambiguation) =

Kiel is a city in northern Germany.

Kiel may also refer to:

- Kiel (electoral district), a Bundestag constituency in Kiel
- Kiel (name)
- Kiel (mountain), Saxony, Germany
- Kiel, Missouri, US
- Kiel, Wisconsin, US
- Loyal, Oklahoma, US, originally Kiel
- KIEL (FM), a radio station (89.3 FM) licensed to serve Loyal, Oklahoma, United States

== See also ==
- Keal (disambiguation)
- Keel (disambiguation)
- Keele (disambiguation)
- Kil (disambiguation)
- Kile (disambiguation)
- Kill (disambiguation)
- Kyl (disambiguation)
- Kyle (disambiguation)
- Kyll, a river in Germany
