= Kyle =

Kyle or Kyles may refer to:

== Name ==
- Kyle (given name), a Gaelic given name, usually masculine
- Kyle (surname), a surname of Scottish origin
- Kyle (musician), a hip hop artist from California
- David Kyles (born 1989), American basketball player

== Places ==
=== Canada ===
- Kyle, Saskatchewan, Canada

=== Ireland ===
- Kyle, County Laois
- Kyle, County Wexford

=== Scotland ===
- Kyle, Ayrshire, area of Scotland which stretched across parts of modern-day East Ayrshire and South Ayrshire
  - Kyle (ward)
- Kyles of Bute, the channel between Isle of Bute and the Cowal Peninsula
- Kyle of Durness, the coastal inlet which divides the Cape Wrath peninsula from the Scottish mainland
- Kyle of Lochalsh, Ross and Cromarty
  - Kyle of Lochalsh Line, a primarily single track railway line
- Kyle of Sutherland, a river estuary

=== United States ===
- Kyle, Indiana, an unincorporated community
- Kyle, South Dakota, a census-designated place
- Kyle, Texas, a city
- Kyles, Missouri, a ghost town
- Kyle Canyon, Nevada
- Lake Kyle, Texas

== Other uses ==
- Kyle, a Scottish term for a strait
- KYLE-TV, a MyNetworkTV network affiliate
- Kyles Athletic, a shinty team from Tighnabruaich, Argyll, Scotland
- SS Kyle, a Newfoundland steamship
- Tropical Storm Kyle
- Kh-28, also known as AS-9 "Kyle", a Soviet anti-radiation missile
- The Kyle Railroad

== See also ==
- Keal (disambiguation)
- Keel (disambiguation)
- Keele (disambiguation)
- Kiel (disambiguation)
- Kil (disambiguation)
- Kile (disambiguation)
- Kill (disambiguation)
- Kyhl
- Kyl (disambiguation)
- Kyll
