= Kill =

Kill often refers to:

- Homicide, the killing of a human by another human
- The act of causing the death of a living organism

Other common uses include:

- Kill (body of water), a body of water, most commonly a creek
- Kill (command), a computing command
- Killed animal, the flesh of which is called carrion

Kill may also refer to:

== Media ==
- Kill!, a 1968 Japanese film directed by Kihachi Okamoto
- Kill , a 2023 Indian action film directed by Nikhil Nagesh Bhat
- Kill (Cannibal Corpse album), 2006
- Kill (Electric Six album), 2009
- "Kill" (song), 2008, by Mell
- The Kills, English-American rock band founded in 2001
- Kill, the original title of the 2023 film Betrayal

== Places in Ireland ==
=== Republic of Ireland ===
- Kill, County Dublin
- Kill, County Kildare
- Kill, County Waterford
- Kill, Kilbixy, County Westmeath
- Kill, Kilcar, County Donegal
- Kill, Kilcleagh, County Westmeath

=== United Kingdom ===
- Kill, County Tyrone, a townland in County Tyrone

== Sports ==
- Baserunner kill, a baseball term
- Penalty kill, an ice hockey term
- Kill, a type of attack in volleyball

== Other ==
- Well kill, the act of preventing flow of reservoir fluids from a well bore

== See also ==
- Keal (disambiguation)
- Keel (disambiguation)
- Keele (disambiguation)
- Kiel (disambiguation)
- Kil (disambiguation)
- Kile (disambiguation)
- Kyl (disambiguation)
- Kyle (disambiguation)
- Kyll
- The Kill (disambiguation)
- The Kills (disambiguation)
- Killing (disambiguation)
