= Kiel (name) =

Kiel is a surname or given name. As first name it is an alternate spelling of Kyle (kahyl). It can be pronounced like "Kyle"

It is also believed to be rooted in the Hawaiian for "lily of the valley".

== Notable bearers of this name ==
As a first name:

- Kiel Brown (born 1984), Australian field hockey player
- Kiel Giddens, Canadian politician
- Kiel Martin (1944–1990), American actor
- Kiel McLeod (born 1982), Canadian hockey player
- Kiel Moe (born 1976), American architect
- Kiel Reijnen (born 1986), American cyclist
- Kiel Pease (born 1983), American Visual Effects Artist
- Kiel Cruz (born 1995), Filipino Engineer

As a surname:

- Blair Kiel (1961–2012), American footballer
- Deb Kiel (born 1957), American politician (Minnesota)
- Emil Charles Kiel (1895–1971), American soldier
- Friedrich Kiel (1821–1885), German composer
- Friedrich-Wilhelm Kiel (1934–2022), German politician
- Gunner Kiel (born 1993), American footballer
- Henry Kiel (1871–1942), American politician, mayor of St. Louis
- Machiel Kiel (1938–2025), Dutch art historian and orientalist
- Niklas Kiel (born 1997), German basketball player
- Peter Kiel (born 1958), Australian rules footballer
- Richard Kiel (1939–2014), American actor
- Shelley Kiel (born 1950), American politician from Nebraska
- Sid Kiel (1916–2007), South African cricketer
- Terrence Kiel (1980–2008), American football player
- Wayne Kiel (born 1949), Canadian curler and coach
- Yehuda Kiel (1916–2011), Israeli educator

== See also ==
- Kiehl, a surname
