= List of American musicians of Irish descent =

This is a list of notable Irish-American musicians.

To be included in this list, the person must have a Wikipedia article and/or references showing the person is Irish American and a notable musician.

== Musicians ==
=== A–J ===
- Christina Aguilera – singer-songwriter; Ecuadorian father and Irish-American mother
- (Gustav Elijah Åhr) Lil Peep rapper and singer
- Tori Amos – singer-songwriter and musician
- Anastacia – singer-songwriter
- Michelle Branch – part Irish through her father
- Laura Branigan – singer-songwriter and musician
- Jeff Buckley – estranged son of Tim Buckley
- Tim Buckley – father was the son of Irish immigrants
- Chris Byrne – pop musician
- Mariah Carey – pop musician
- Aaron Carter – singer and Nick Carter's brother
- Nick Carter – member of the boy band Backstreet Boys
- Dennis Casey – Flogging Molly member
- Ken Casey – bass player and vocalist for the Boston-based Celtic punk-rock band Dropkick Murphys
- Kelly Clarkson – pop singer
- Rosemary Clooney – singer and actress
- Kurt Cobain – singer-songwriter of the rock band Nirvana
- George M. Cohan – singer-songwriter; vaudeville and Broadway theatre performer
- Edward Joseph Collins – composer
- Judy Collins – singer/songwriter
- Eddie Condon – jazz guitarist
- Alice Cooper – of partial Irish descent
- Copywrite – rapper; mixed Irish and Italian descent
- Billy Corgan – singer, lead guitarist of alternative-rock band The Smashing Pumpkins
- Chris Cornell – lead singer of rock band Soundgarden
- Frankie Cosmos – of Irish descent on her father's side
- Henry Cowell – composer
- Auliʻi Cravalho – singer and actress of partial Irish descent
- Bing Crosby – singer and actor
- Miley Cyrus – pop and country singer, songwriter and actress, daughter of Billy Ray Cyrus and Tish Cyrus, sister of Noah Cyrus, ex of Nick Jonas and Liam Hemsworth
- Chris Daughtry – American Idol 2006 finalist; lead singer of the rock band Daughtry
- Dennis Day – singer
- Lee DeWyze – American Idol 2010 winner
- Marié Digby – singer-songerwriter
- Howie Dorough – member of the boy band Backstreet Boys; Irish father
- Jimmy Dorsey – jazz musician
- Tommy Dorsey – jazz musician
- Hilary Duff – actress and singer/songwriter
- Stephyn Duffy – singer-songwriter, guitarist, musician
- Billie Eilish – singer-songwriter, director, actress, musician, and first female and youngest artist ever to win all 4 general field categories at the Grammy Awards
- Everlast (born 1969) – singer-songwriter; known for his genre-crossing mix of rap and acoustic-based rock music
- Eileen Farrell – opera singer
- Fergie – pop singer
- Karen Finley – performer and musician
- Michael Fitzpatrick – frontman of Fitz and the Tantrums
- John Fogerty – singer-songwriter for rock band Creedence Clearwater Revival
- Mike Fuentes – drummer for Pierce The Veil, born to an Irish American mother
- Vic Fuentes – lead singer and guitarist for Pierce The Veil, born to an Irish American mother
- G-Eazy (born 1989) – rapper
- Judy Garland – singer and actress
- Billy Gibbons – guitarist and singer for rock band ZZ Top; has Irish ancestry on both sides of family
- Greg Graffin – singer-songwriter for punk-rock band Bad Religion
- Conan Gray – singer-songwriter
- Sasha Grey – actress and musician
- Kirk Hammett – guitarist for rock band Metallica; Irish father, Filipino mother
- Kay Hanley – lead singer and songwriter for rock band Letters to Cleo
- Arthur Hanlon – pianist and Latin music musician
- Jack Harlow – rapper
- Matt Heafy – lead singer and guitarist for heavy-metal band Trivium; Irish father, Japanese mother
- Jimi Hendrix – guitarist, singer
- Swan Hennessy – composer
- Victor Herbert – composer
- James Hetfield – lead singer and guitarist for rock band Metallica
- Paris Hilton – media personality, businesswoman, socialite, model, singer, and actress
- Brent Hinds – singer and guitarist for heavy-metal band Mastodon
- Julianne Hough – country-music singer and ballroom dancer
- Vanessa Hudgens – actress and singer
- Andy Hurley – drummer for rock band Fall Out Boy
- Danny Hutton – one of the three lead vocalists in the rock band Three Dog Night
- Jonas Brothers – pop-rock band; of Irish descent from their maternal grandfather

=== K–Z ===
- Maynard James Keenan – singer/songwriter
- Bill Kelliher – guitarist for the heavy-metal band Mastodon; father was an Irish immigrant who moved to New York in the 1950s
- Tori Kelly – singer/songwriter
- Alicia Keys – singer/songwriter
- Dave King – singer/songwriter
- Chris Kirkpatrick – former member of the boy band 'N Sync
- Larry Kirwan – punk musician
- Beyoncé – pop singer
- Ben Kyle – singer-songwriter; leader of the Americana band Romantica
- Lindsay Lohan – actress, singer-songwriter, producer, and entrepreneur
- Demi Lovato – singer/songwriter and actress of Hispanic, Italian and Irish ancestry
- Lorna Luft – actress and singer
- Macklemore (Ben Haggerty) – rapper
- Benji Madden – lead guitarist of the pop-punk band Good Charlotte; both parents are Irish
- Joel Madden – lead singer of the pop-punk band Good Charlotte; both parents are Irish
- Barry Manilow – iconic singer/songwriter from Brooklyn; paternal great-grandfather from County Limerick
- Meaghan Jette Martin – actress and singer from television musical film Camp Rock (2008)
- Mike McColgan – former lead singer of the Celtic-punk band Dropkick Murphys; vocalist of the punk-rock band Street Dogs
- John McCormack – tenor
- Travie McCoy – rapper, singer co founder and lead singer of Gym Class Heroes
- Tim McGraw – singer; both parents have Irish ancestry
- The McGuire Sisters – female vocal group of the 1950s
- Katharine McPhee – singer; runner-up on American Idol, season 5
- Natalie Merchant – singer; mother is of Irish descent
- Patrick Monahan – singer with the pop-rock band Train
- Mandy Moore – actress and singer; father is Irish
- Jim Morrison – singer-songwriter of the rock band The Doors
- Lacey Mosley – lead singer of hard-rock band Flyleaf
- Gerry Mulligan – jazz musician
- Dave Mustaine – co-founder of the heavy-metal band Megadeth; first lead guitarist for the heavy-metal band Metallica
- James Murphy founder, lead singer, songwriter, musician of LCD Soundsystem
- Willie Nile – rock singer-songwriter
- Bradley Nowell – lead singer and guitarist for the ska-punk band Sublime
- Virginia O'Brien – actress and singer
- Finneas O'Connell – Singer, songwriter, record producer, musician, and actor with Scottish and Irish ancestry
- Aubrey O'Day – member of the female music group Danity Kane
- Chauncey Olcott – singer and composer
- Katy Perry – her great-great-grandmother was from Eyrecourt, County Galway, Ireland
- Tom Petty – rock musician
- Pink – pop-singer
- Robert Pollard – singer-songwriter; leader of the alternative-rock band Guided by Voices
- Elvis Presley – singer
- Seth Putnam – musician
- Carmel Quinn – singer
- Christopher "Kid" Reid – rapper; Jamaican and Irish descent
- Trent Reznor – singer-songwriter, composer and record producer; founder of the industrial-rock band Nine Inch Nails
- Geoff Rickly – vocalist of the bands Thursday and No Devotion
- Olivia Rodrigo, pop singer
- Jack Russell – founder of Great White
- Bianca Ryan – singer/songwriter and actress
- Michael Shrieve - drummer of Santana
- Slaine – rapper
- Carly Smithson – Dublin, Ireland, native who placed sixth on the seventh installment of American Idol; lead singer of the gothic-metal band We Are the Fallen
- Britney Spears – pop singer
- Bruce Springsteen – instrumentalist and singer-songwriter
- Gwen Stefani – mother is part Irish
- Kevin Shields – vocalist and guitarist of My Bloody Valentine
- The Rev – former drummer for metal band Avenged Sevenfold
- Jessica Sutta – member of pop girl group The Pussycat Dolls
- Corey Taylor – lead singer of heavy metal band Slipknot
- Stuart Michael Thomas – film and television composer and producer
- Tinashe – singer of Zimbabwean, Danish, Norwegian and Irish descent
- Chris Trousdale – singer
- Shania Twain – pop singer
- Danielle White – singer from the television singing-competition series American Juniors
- Joseph M. White – tenor
- Robert White – tenor
- Ace Young – singer from American Idol

== See also ==
- List of Americans of Irish descent
- Lists of musicians
