= Alfred Jansson =

American painter

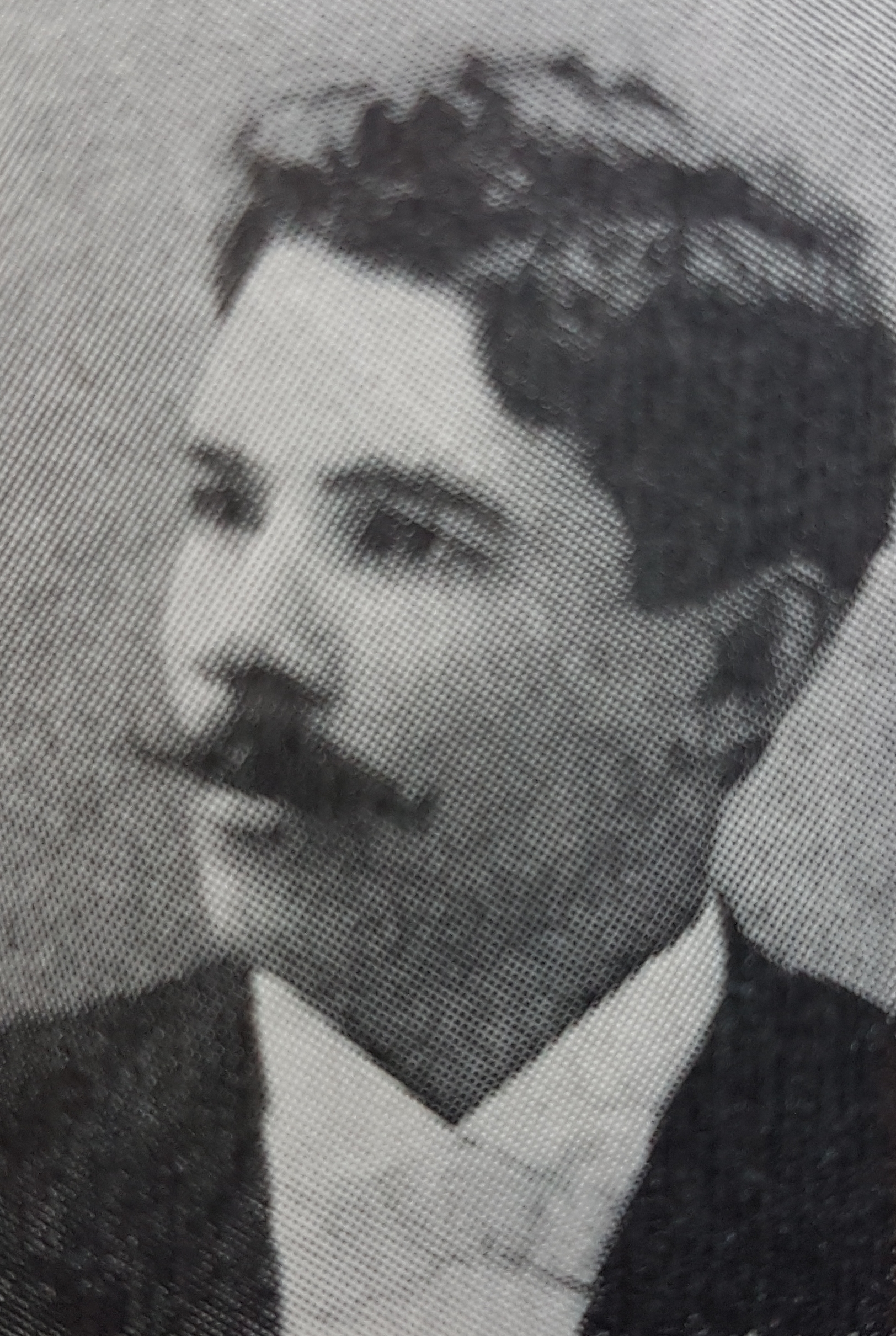
- Jansson's photography in Svenskt konstnärslexikon
- Born: December 11, 1863; Kil, Värmland
- Died: September 4, 1931 (aged 67); Chicago
- Known for: landscape painting
- Movement: Impressionism

Alfred Jansson (December 11, 1863 – September 4, 1931) was a Swedish-American landscape painter.

Jansson was born in Kil, Värmland. He studied in Stockholm and Paris before emigrating to the US in 1889 and settling in Chicago. He painted landscapes of prairie and winter scenes. He died in Chicago.

Jansson's painting Sunset in the Park is in Nationalmuseum, Snösamt in Smålands museum in Växjö and other works are in several American museums.

== Gallery ==
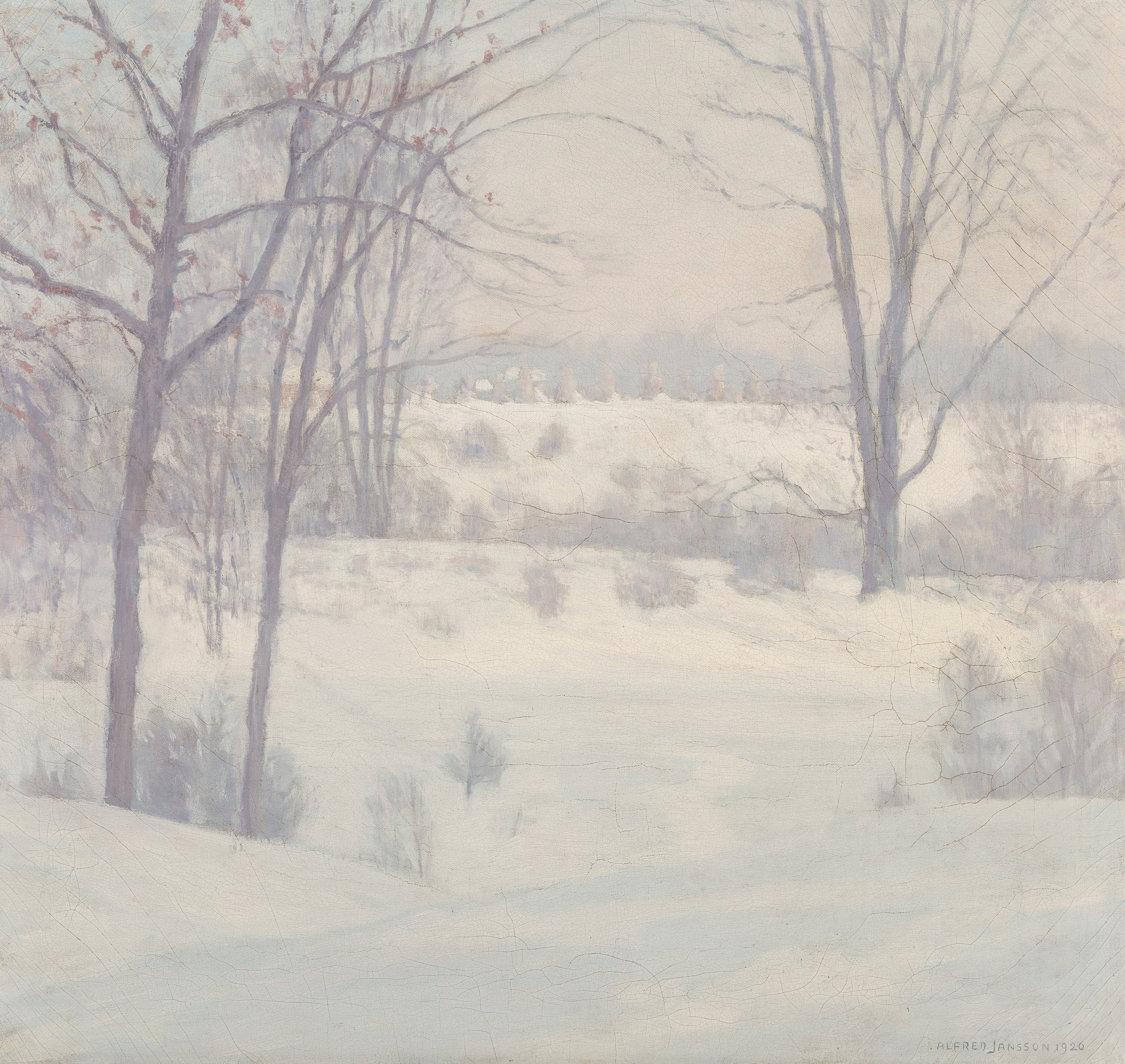

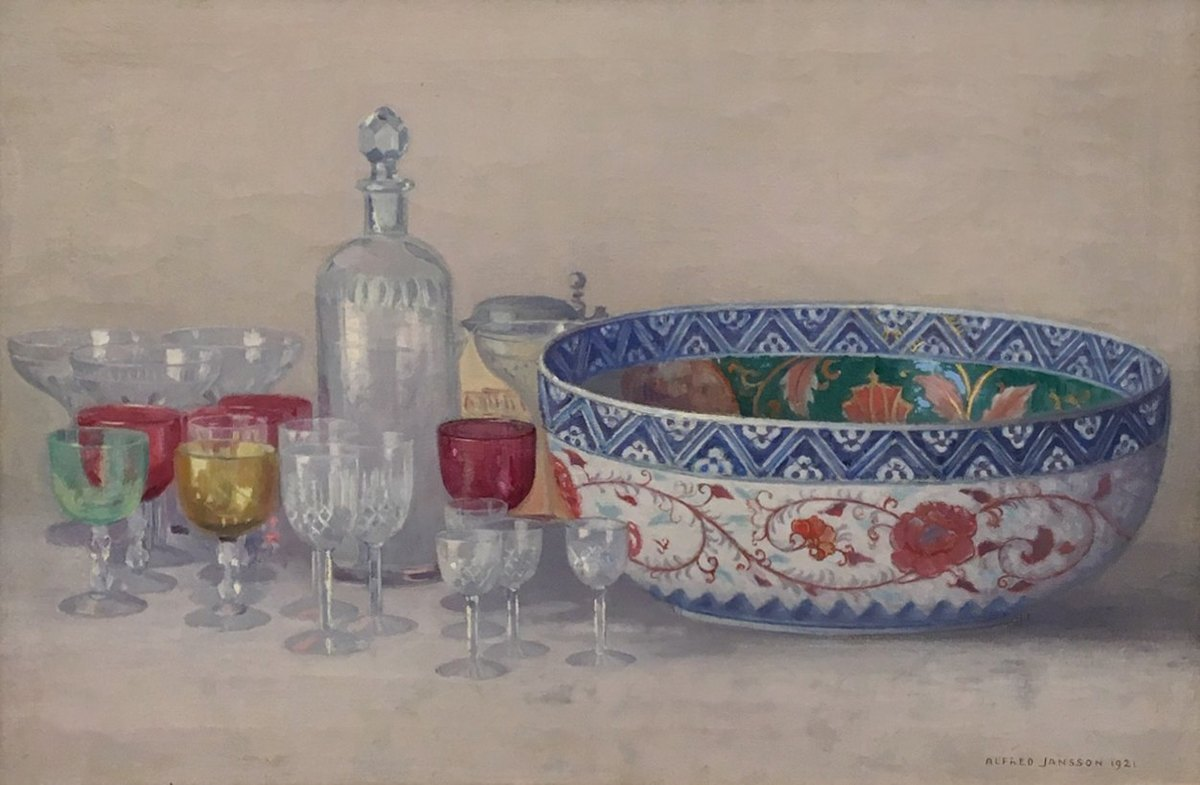

== Sources ==
- Greenhouse, Wendy. "Alfred Jansson". M. Christine Schwartz Collection.
- Svenskt konstnärslexikon, vol III site 261, Allhems Förlag, Malmö
