= Richard Kyle =

Richard Kyle may refer to:

- Richard H. Kyle (1937–2021), American judge in Minnesota
- Richard G. Kyle, American academic, theologian and author
- Richard G. Kyle (businessman), CEO of Timken Company
- Richard Kyle (politician), member of the Arizona House of Representatives
