= Kihle =

Kihle is a surname. Notable people with the surname include:

- Anker Kihle (1917–2000), Norwegian footballer
- Harald Kihle (1905–1997), Norwegian painter and illustrator
- Morten Kihle (born 1967), Norwegian footballer

== See also ==
- Kile (surname)
