= Waldeifel =

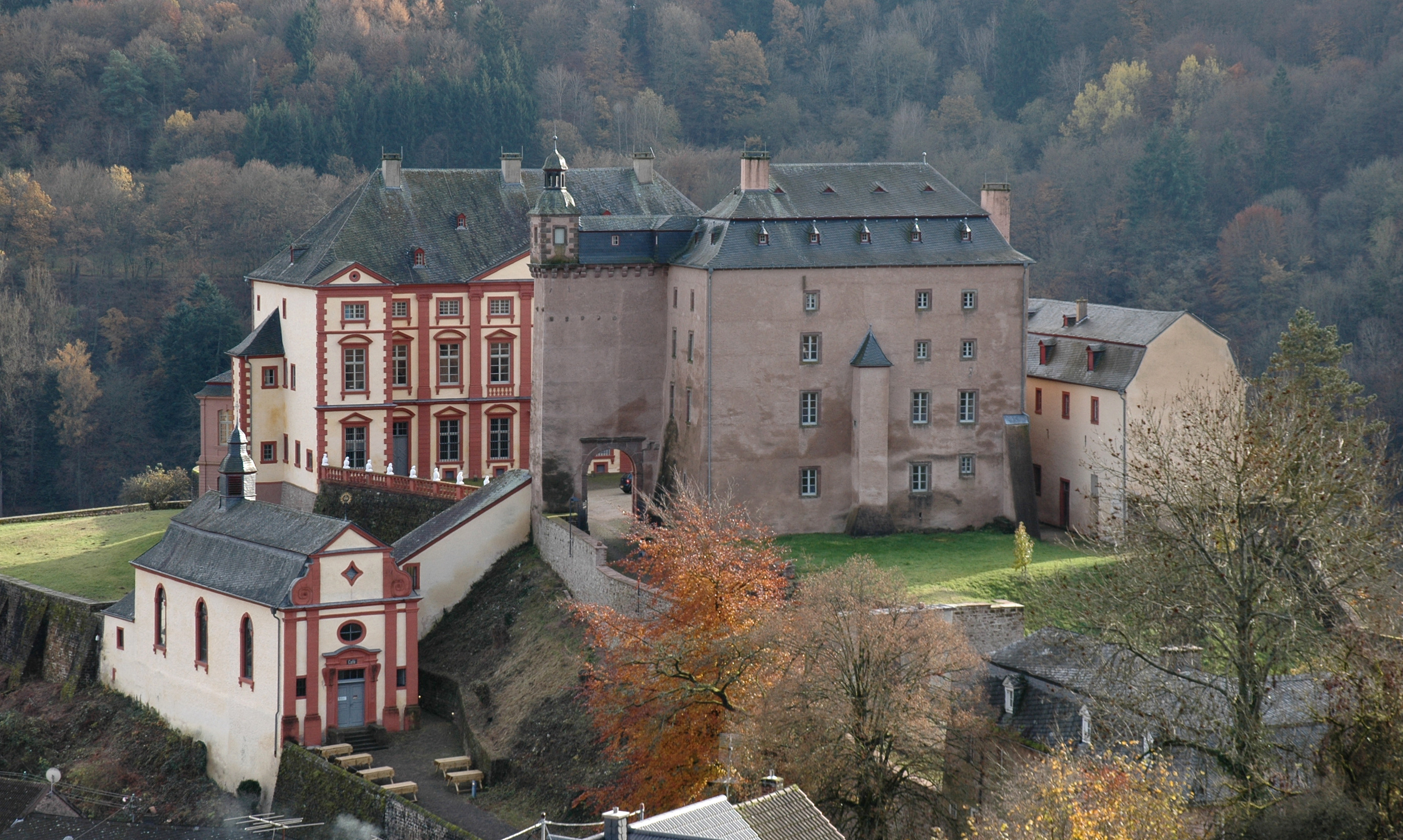
Schloss Malberg, a baroque castle in the Waldeifel

The Waldeifel or Kyllburger Waldeifel is a landscape region of the South Eifel in Germany along the middle and lower Kyll valley and its immediate surrounding area. The uplands vary in height from 300 to 500 metres above sea level. In the west the Waldeifel borders on the Bitburg Gutland (Bitburger Gutland).

There the Kyll leaves the Snow Eifel, cutting deeper into the as truncated highland of the Eifel and the foothills of the High Eifel and Volcanic Eifel descend towards the south, the countryside of this Eifel landscape is characterised by extensive woodlands, frequently interrupted by small scale arable fields and pastures.

From north to south flows the Kyll in numerous meanders through the ancient mountains before emptying into the Moselle north of Trier. In the geographical centre is the town of Kyllburg which is recorded as early as AD 800. It is the seat of the collective municipality of Kyllburg which was formed in 1970 and is also the smallest town in the German state of Rhineland-Palatinate.

The region is popular, especially in summer and autumn, as a holiday region for hikers and cyclists.
