= Kiehl =

Kiehl is a surname. Notable people with the surname include:

- August Kiehl (1854–1938), Dutch actor, director and playwright
- Cinta Laura Kiehl (born 1993), Indonesian actress, singer, and model
- Heinz Kiehl (1943–2016), German wrestler
- Jeffrey Kiehl (born 1952), American climatologist
- Jesse Kiehl (born 1976), American politician
- Kent Kiehl, American neuroscientist
- Marina Kiehl (born 1965), German skier
- Reinhardt Kiehl (1935–2026), German mathematician

== See also ==
- Keel (surname)
- Kiehl Frazier (born 1992), American footballer
- Kiehl's, brand of cosmetics
- Kiel (disambiguation)
