= Keels =

Keels may refer to:

- Keels, Newfoundland and Labrador, Canada
- Paul Keels (21st century), play-by-play radio sports announcer
- Trevor Keels (born 2003), American basketball player

== See also ==
- Keel (disambiguation)
