= Kil (surname) =

Kil is a surname, and may refer to:

- Ayşe Kil (born 1972), Turkish sport shooter
- Chosil Kil (born 1975), South Korean artist
- Pelle Kil (born 1971), Dutch cyclist
- Kil Sŏnju (1869–1935), Korean Presbyterian minister
- Kil Son-hui (born 1986), North Korean footballer

== See also ==
- Kile (surname)
