= Fagerås =

- Location within Sweden
- Coordinates: 59°32′N 13°12′E
- Country: Sweden
- Province: Värmland
- County: Värmland County
- Municipality: Kil Municipality

Area
  - Total: 0.77 km^{2} (0.30 sq mi)

Population (31 December 2010)
  - Total: 427
  - Density: 556/km^{2} (1,440/sq mi)
- Time zone: UTC+1 (CET)
  - Summer (DST): UTC+2 (CEST)

Fagerås is a locality situated in Kil Municipality, Värmland County, Sweden, with 427 inhabitants in 2010.
