= The Kills (disambiguation) =

The Kills are an indie rock band.

The Kills or Kills may also refer to:

- The Kills (novel), by Richard House, 2013
- The Kills, a 2004 novel by Linda Fairstein
- Kills (mixtape), by jj, 2010

== See also ==
- The Kill (disambiguation)
- Kill (disambiguation)
