= The Kill (disambiguation) =

"The Kill" is a song by Thirty Seconds to Mars.

The Kill may also refer to:

- The Kill (novel) or La Curée, a novel by Émile Zola
- "The Kill", a song by Joy Division from Still, 1981
- "The Kill", a song by Maggie Rogers from Don't Forget Me, 2024

== See also ==
- Kill (disambiguation)
- The Kills (disambiguation)
