= Kyhl =

Kyhl is a surname. Notable people with the surname include:

- Christian Kyhl (1762–1827), Danish gunsmith and inventor
- Henrik Kyhl (1793–1866), Danish clockmaker and politician
- Vernon Kyhl (1908–1973), American politician

== See also ==
- Kyl (disambiguation)
- Kyle (disambiguation)
