= Kyllburg =

Town in Germany

- Town
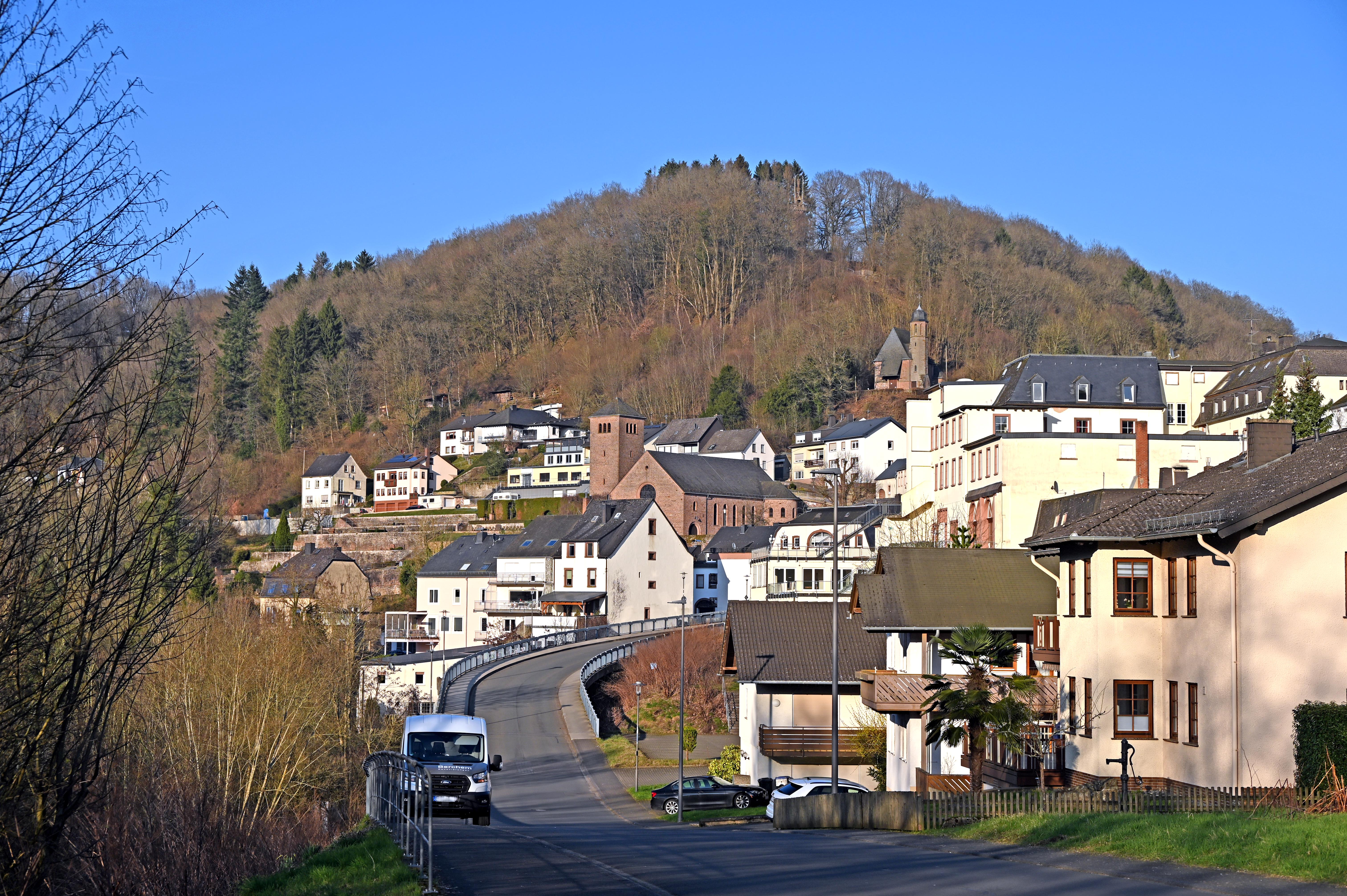

- Coat of arms

- Location of Kyllburg within Eifelkreis Bitburg-Prüm district
- Interactive map of Kyllburg
- Location within Germany Location within Rhineland-Palatinate
- Coordinates: 50°02′31″N 06°35′41″E
- Country: Germany
- State: Rhineland-Palatinate
- District: Eifelkreis Bitburg-Prüm
- Municipal assoc.: Bitburger Land

Government
  - Mayor (2019–24): Wolfgang Krämer (CDU)

Area
  - Total: 4.62 km^{2} (1.78 sq mi)
- Elevation: 300 m (980 ft)

Population (2025-12-31)
  - Total: 906
  - Density: 196/km^{2} (508/sq mi)
- Time zone: UTC+01:00 (CET)
  - Summer (DST): UTC+02:00 (CEST)
- Postal codes: 54655
- Dialling codes: 06563
- Vehicle registration: BIT
- Website: www.stadt-kyllburg.de

Kyllburg (German pronunciation: [ˈkɪlbʊʁk]) is a town in the Waldeifel region in the district of Bitburg-Prüm, in Rhineland-Palatinate, Germany. It is situated in the Eifel mountains, on the river Kyll, approximately 10 km north-east of Bitburg.

Kyllburg was the seat of the former Verbandsgemeinde ("collective municipality") Kyllburg. Since 1 July 2014 it is part of the Verbandsgemeinde Bitburger Land.

== Notable people ==
- Patrick Schnieder (born 1968), politician
