= Keel Mountain =

Keel Mountain may refer to:

- Keel Mountain (Alabama)
- Keel Mountain (Oregon)
- Scandinavian Mountains, also known as Keel Mountains
