= William Booth Wecker =

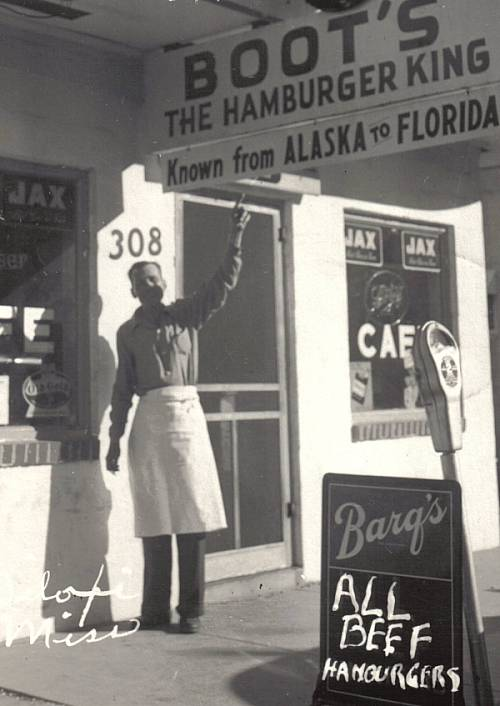
Will Wecker in retirement. Biloxi, Mississippi, 1955.

William Booth Wecker (December 17, 1892 – September 3, 1969) was an American entertainer and showman and was also the agent for his wife Bee Kyle, a high diver.

William Booth Wecker was born in Owensboro, Kentucky on December 17, 1892. Wecker was born to Frank and Martha Beverly Boehm Wecker. Wecker's father was a German immigrant and a Confederate drummer boy during the Civil War, while his mother a descendant of the Reverend Martin Boehm who helped found the United Methodist Church. He had four brothers, George W., Frank, Isidore, and Joseph Wecker, all of whom lived during their adult lives in St. Louis, Missouri. His brother Joe was a friend of Charles Lindbergh and helped pay for his nonstop flight from New York City to Paris.

Will Wecker served in the United States Army in France in World War I, and he was a member of the Army of Occupation in Germany after that war. He married Beatrice (Bee) Kyle, from Maine, who was a high diver, and Will became her manager. They traveled throughout the United States and the world, and he and Bee worked at carnivals and circuses and other shows.

In 1939, she was a featured high diver in a show in Japan. Will returned to the United States and told his brother George's son-in-law, Herman Francis Borgman, that, based on his experiences and contacts in Japan, he had gained the impression that someday the United States was going to have to fight the Japanese.

Will Wecker, through the years, did many things as an entertainer and showman. He was a jockey, a magician, a circus producer, a pitch man on circus main ways, and he once entered a lion cage at a circus and held back an attacking lion, saving the lion tamer's life.

In the late 1930s and early 1940s, he produced the annual Firemen Circuses in St. Louis. In the summer of 1946, Will Wecker and Bee Kyle were with the Cole Brothers Circus in Effingham, Illinois. Will was in charge of all the concessions on the circus main way. Bee Kyle was bedridden (in her and Will's house trailer) and unable to high dive any more, for she, while appearing in a show in Alabama, had hit the side of the tank once too often, and doctors said if she hit the side of the tank again, she would die.

Will and Bee subsequently moved to Biloxi, Mississippi, where they operated a restaurant. Bee Kyle was famous for her cooking. Wecker died on September 3, 1969, and was interred with his wife at the Jefferson Barracks National Cemetery. They never had any children.
