= Högboda =

- Location within Sweden
- Coordinates: 59°34′N 13°01′E
- Country: Sweden
- Province: Värmland
- County: Värmland County
- Municipality: Kil Municipality

Area
  - Total: 0.59 km^{2} (0.23 sq mi)

Population (31 December 2010)
  - Total: 262
  - Density: 443/km^{2} (1,150/sq mi)
- Time zone: UTC+1 (CET)
  - Summer (DST): UTC+2 (CEST)

Högboda is a locality situated in Kil Municipality, Värmland County, Sweden, with 262 inhabitants in 2010.
