= Christiane Jacox Kyle =

American poet

Christiane Jacox Kyle (born 1950) is an American poet. She is a member of PEN American Center 2006.

== Works ==
- Bears dancing in the northern air. Yale University Press. 1991. ISBN 978-0-300-05007-3.

Translations

- Gabriela Mistral (1996). Poemas de las madres. Translated by Christiane Jacox Kyle. Illustrator Sara Adlerstein González. Eastern Washington University Press. ISBN 978-0-910055-29-1.
