= Kil =

Kil or KIL may refer to:

== Geography ==
=== Features ===
- Kil (body of water)

=== Places ===
- Kil Municipality, a municipality in Värmland County, Sweden
  - Kil, Värmland, a village in Kil Municipality in Värmland County, Sweden
- Kil, Nacka Municipality, a village in Nacka Municipality in Stockholm County, Sweden
- Kil Hundred, a former hundred in Värmland County, Sweden
- Kil, Telemark, a village in Kragerø Municipality in Telemark county, Norway
- Dordtsche Kil, a river in the Netherlands

== People ==
- Kil (surname)

== Media ==
- KIL (film), 2014, Malaysia

== Abbreviations ==
The abbreviation KIL may refer to:

- Kildonan railway station, the National Rail code for this station in Scotland
- Kongsvinger IL, a sports club in Kongsvinger, Norway
  - KIL Toppfotball, a sports club in Kongsvinger, Norway
- Russian rescue ship KIL-168, a Russian ship

== See also ==
- Kiel (disambiguation)
- Kyl (disambiguation)
