= Keel (surname) =

Keel is a surname. Notable people with the surname include:

- Adam Keel (1924-2018), Swiss visual artist
- Aileen Keel (born 1952), Scottish doctor and academic
- Alton G. Keel Jr. (born 1943), American engineer, diplomat and businessman
- Avo Keel (born 1962), Estonian volleyball coach
- Brooks A. Keel, American academic and university president
- Carl Eugen Keel (1885-1961), Swiss Expressionist artist
- Frederick Keel (1871-1954), English composer and singer
- Howard Keel (1919-2004), American actor who starred in classic motion picture musicals
- Johann Joseph Keel (1837-1902), Swiss politician
- John Keel (1930-2009), American author, journalist, and ufologist
- Larry Keel (born 1968), American bluegrass singer and songwriter
- Mary Lou Keel, American judge
- Philipp Keel, Swiss artist, writer and publisher
- Ron Keel (born 1961), American heavy metal vocalist and guitarist
- Stephen Keel (born 1983), American soccer player
- Thomas Keell (1866-1938), English compositor and journal editor

== See also ==
- Kiehl
