= Keel Mountain (Oregon) =

- Location within Oregon

Highest point
- Elevation: 2,833 ft (863 m) NGVD 29
- Coordinates: 44°32′03″N 122°37′20″W

Geography
- Location: Linn County, Oregon, U.S.
- Topo map: USGS Keel Mountain

Keel Mountain is a mountain in Linn County, Oregon, USA. Variant names include Green Mountain and Green Ridge.
