= Chosil Kil =

South Korean artist

- Born: 1975 (age 50–51); Seoul, South Korea
- Occupation: Artist

Korean name
- Hangul: 길초실
- RR: Gil Chosil
- MR: Kil Ch'osil

Chosil Kil (born 1975) is a South Korean artist.

Kil was born in Seoul. In 2004 she graduated from the Royal College of Art, London.

Kil lives and works in London and Seoul and is represented by Aoyama | Meguro, Tokyo. and Galleri Opdahl, Norway

Kil has exhibited at institutions and festivals internationally including: Basel Statements 2013; 9th Gwangju Biennale, Korea; Objectif Exhibitions, Antwerp, Belgium; Lewis Glucksman Gallery, Cork, Ireland; National Museum of Contemporary Art, Korea; Seoul Museum of Art, Korea; Adelaide International Festival, 2012, Australia; Cornerhouse, UK.

== Publications ==
- Libretto VOL II, Mousse Publishing (2013)
- Chosil Kil: 2007-2009 (2009)
