= Kiel Moe =

American architect

Kiel Kenneth Moe (born 1976). is a registered practicing American architect. Moe has taught architecture and energy at University of Illinois at Chicago, Syracuse University, Northeastern University and Harvard Graduate School of Design. He holds the Gerald Sheff Chair of Architecture in McGill University.

Moe received the B.Arch from the University of Cincinnati, M.Arch from University of Virginia, and a Master in Design and Environmental Studies from the Harvard Graduate School of Design Advanced Studies Program.

== Honors and awards ==
2012, 2014, 2016 Fellow, MacDowell Colony for the Arts

2013 Boston Design Biennial winner by Boston Society of Architects

2012 Barbara and Andrew Senchak Fellowship, The MacDowell Colony

2011 Architectural League Prize by Architectural League of New York

2011 Young Architects Award American Institute of Architects

2010 Fellow of American Academy in Rome (FAAR)

== Books ==
- Unless: The Seagram Building Construction Ecology; Actar Publishers; New York, Barcelona (2020)
- Empire, State & Building; Actar Publishers; New York, Barcelona (2017)
- Insulating modernism: isolated and non-isolated thermodynamics in architecture, Basel, Switzerland; Boston : Birkhäuser, (2014)
- Convergence: Architectural Agenda for Energy, Routledge, Taylor & Francis Group., (2013)
- Building Systems: Technology, Design, & Society, Abingdon, Oxon [England]; New York, NY : Routledge (2012)
- Thermally Active Surfaces in Architecture (2010)
- Integrated Design in Contemporary Architecture, Princeton Architectural Press (2008)
