= Kil Municipality =

Kil Municipality Kils kommun
- Municipality
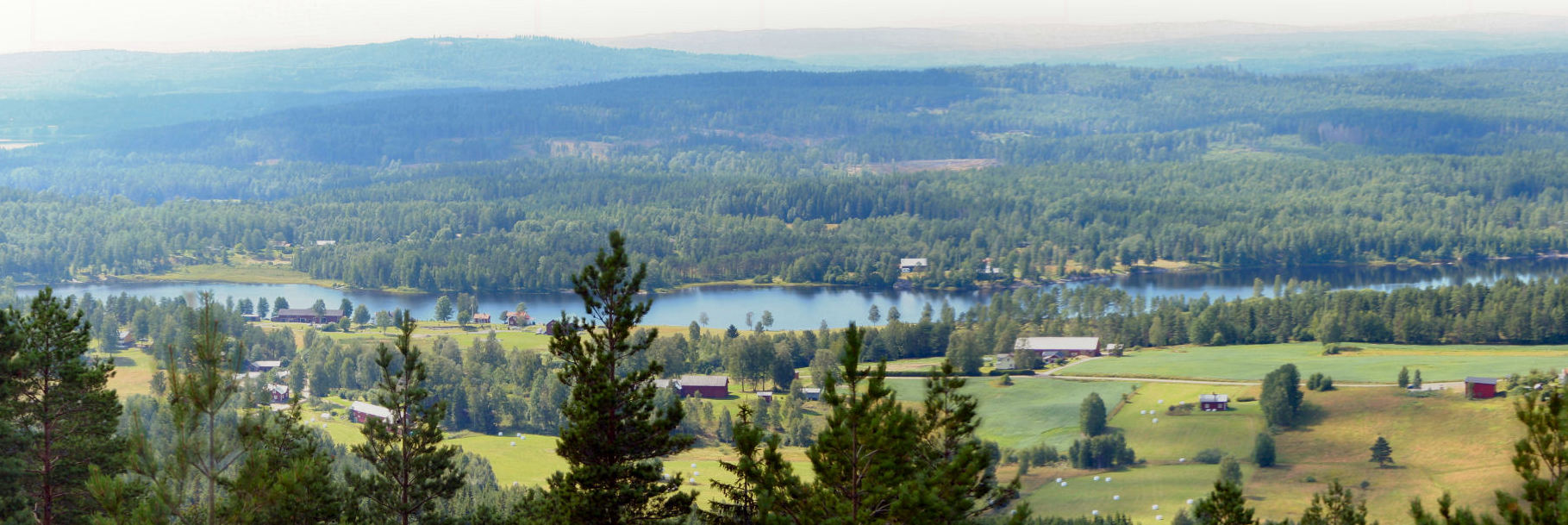

- Coat of arms

- Coordinates: 59°30′N 13°18′E
- Country: Sweden
- County: Värmland County
- Seat: Kil

Area
  - Total: 406.87 km^{2} (157.09 sq mi)
  - Land: 359.73 km^{2} (138.89 sq mi)
  - Water: 47.14 km^{2} (18.20 sq mi)
- Area as of 1 January 2014.

Population (30 June 2025)
  - Total: 12,014
  - Density: 33.397/km^{2} (86.499/sq mi)
- Time zone: UTC+1 (CET)
  - Summer (DST): UTC+2 (CEST)
- ISO 3166 code: SE
- Province: Värmland
- Municipal code: 1715
- Website: www.kil.se

Kil Municipality (Swedish: Kils kommun) is a municipality in Värmland County in west central Sweden. Its seat is located in the town of Kil.

The local government reform of 1971 amalgamated Stora Kil, Järnskog and a part of Brunskog, thus forming Kil Municipality.

Kil means wedge, crack or similar in Swedish, in this case referring to a bay (old Swedish). The name is at least from the fifteenth century, referring to a bay by the small lake Hyn, where the church was constructed. The town later became the seat of the juridical Kil Hundred, which is known to have existed in 1426. The wedge is noted in the coat of arms.

The town is notable as the location of Sweden's first railroad in 1849.

== Localities ==
- Fagerås
- Högboda
- Kil (seat)

== Demographics ==
This is a demographic table based on Kil Municipality's electoral districts in the 2022 Swedish general election sourced from SVT's election platform, in turn taken from SCB official statistics.

In total there were 12,129 residents, including 9,297 Swedish citizens of voting age. 46.1% voted for the left coalition and 53.2% for the right coalition. Indicators are in percentage points except population totals and income.

Location	Residents	Citizen adults	Left vote	Right vote	Employed	Swedish parents	Foreign heritage	Income SEK	Degree
Location			%	%					
Boda	815	652	44.2	54.5	77	94	6	24,568	37
Dalliden	2,154	1,790	51.2	47.8	80	91	9	23,320	35
Fagerås	861	643	36.0	62.7	80	93	7	24,403	32
Frykerud	839	671	43.3	55.9	89	95	5	27,757	37
Sannerud	2,381	1,705	49.9	49.3	72	79	21	20,871	30
Stenåsen	2,221	1,702	46.4	53.2	84	93	7	27,994	38
Tolita	870	653	39.9	59.8	83	95	5	26,106	35
Vikstad	1,988	1,481	44.8	54.9	88	94	6	29,054	47
Source: SVT

== Sister cities ==
- Laihia, Finland
- Skuodas, Lithuania
- Svinninge, Denmark
- Trysil, Norway
