= Beatrice Kyle =

American diver

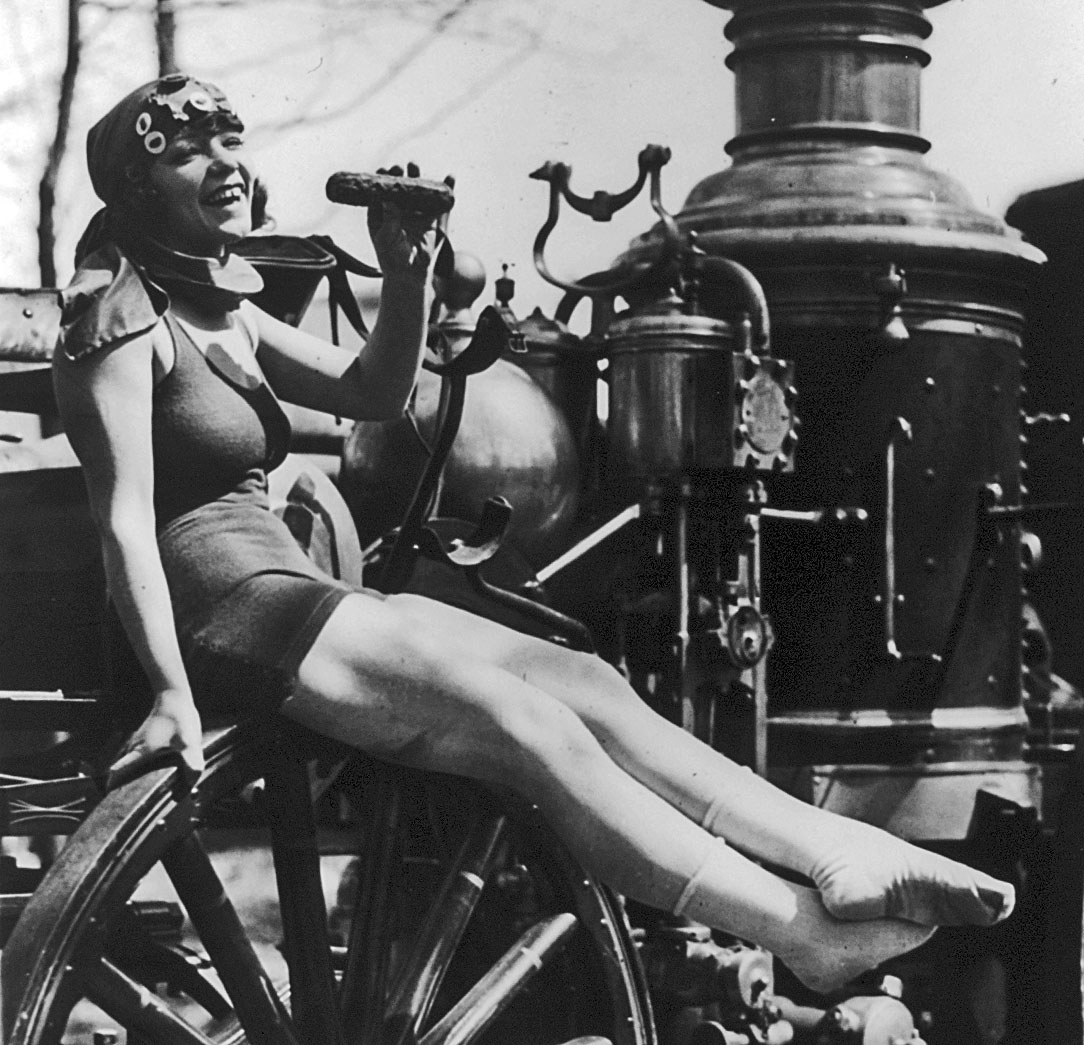
- Beatrice Kyle sitting on a fire engine in 1924 in her high diving outfit

Personal information
- Born: January 23, 1902 Maine, United States
- Died: July 7, 1970 (aged 68) Missouri, United States

Sport
- Sport: Diving

Beatrice Kyle (January 23, 1902 – July 7, 1970) was known as Bee Kyle and was a world-famous American high diver. She would jump into an 8-foot-deep (2.4 m) tank of water from a height of 100 feet (30 m) or more.

Kyle was born in the state of Maine in the United States of America in 1902 and made her living as a high diver. She married William Booth Wecker who worked at various jobs and carnivals and circuses. He did everything from selling tickets to lion taming. They had a nomadic lifestyle and performed all over the world including Japan in the 1930s. They never had any children.

In 1939, Billboard Magazine had a contest on who the most popular outdoor performer was in the U.S. and Kyle won, getting 32,728 votes.

Kyle suffered in her old age from injuries sustained while diving. She died in 1970 and was buried with her husband at Jefferson Barracks National Cemetery in Missouri.
