= Thomas Keele =

Thomas Keele may refer to:

- Thomas Keell (1886–1938), English anarchist newspaper editor
- Thomas Keele (MP) for Wycombe (UK Parliament constituency)
