= Jayanthi Kyle =

American gospel and soul singer/songwriter

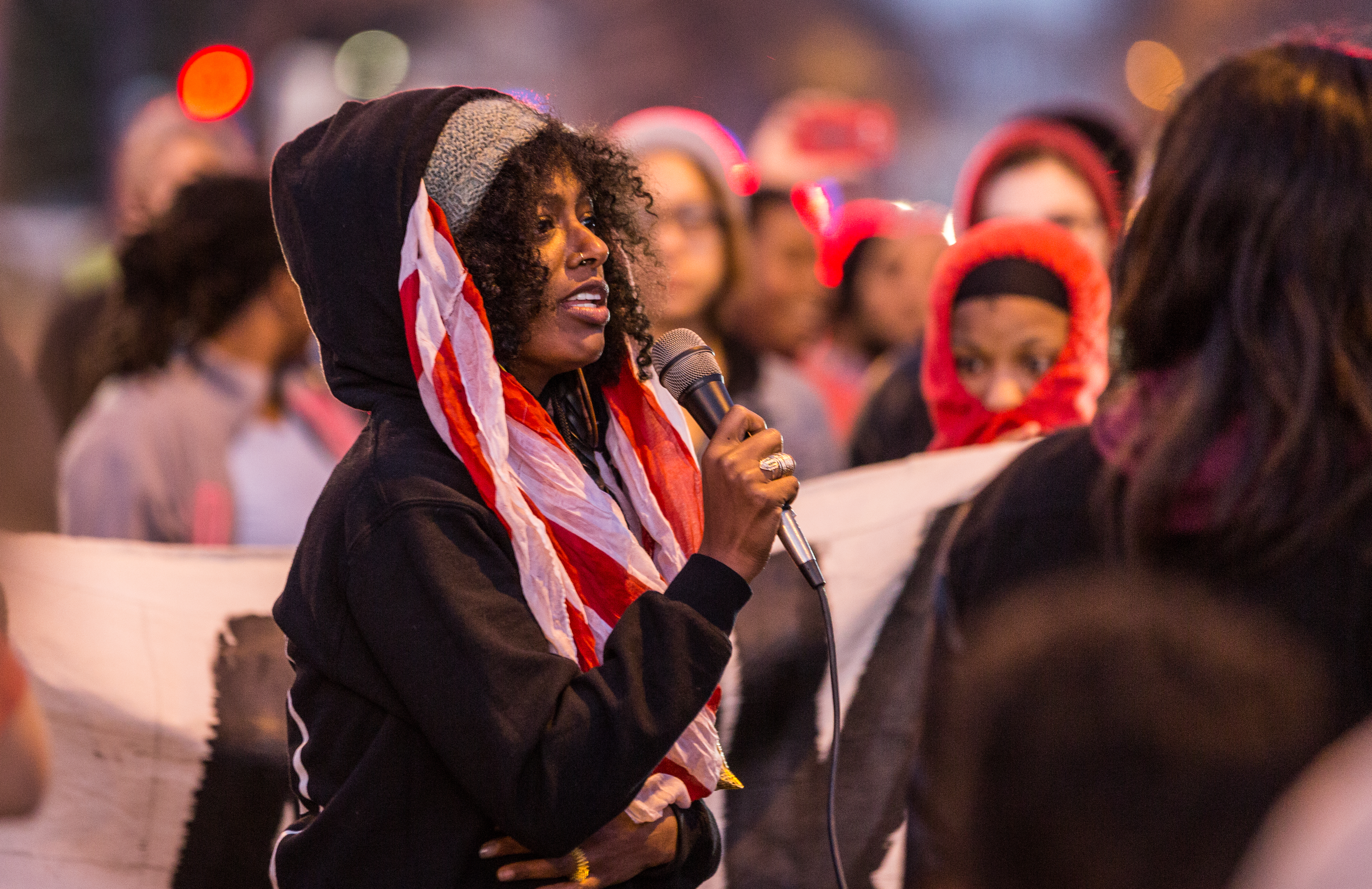
- Kyle performing at a Black Lives Matter demonstration, 2015

Background information
- Born: c. 1979
- Genres: Gospel, soul
- Occupation: Singer

Jayanthi Kyle (born c.1979) is an American gospel and soul singer/songwriter based in Minneapolis, Minnesota who uses music, song, and storytelling to empower both youth and adults alike. Kyle has been active in more than 11 bands in her career, including Black Audience, Jayanthi Kyle and the Crybabies, Romantica, Gospel Machine, Davis Bain Band, Passed Presents, Give Get Sistet, Miss Pennie's Microphone, and The Blacker The Berry Arts Collective.

== Early life ==
Kyle was born c. 1979 to an Indian father and a Native American and black mother. Her family moved from Ford Heights, Illinois to Maple Grove, Minnesota. She grew up in Maple Grove and Chicago's South Side. Kyle discovered her love of singing at an early age through her mother, as well as through singing in Baptist, Pentecostal, and Evangelical congregations with her sister, of which she became active because both her parents were preachers.

== Career ==
Kyle formed the band Black Audience to open for Jim Ruiz at PalmFest. The band initially included Kyle's husband Robin Kyle, her brother Luke, Mike Gunther, and Doug Anderson. Gunther left the group, which was joined by bassist Jon Davis and harmonium player Matt Hardy. The group plays old gospel, country, blues, traditional Irish reels, and covers of songs by Bob Dylan and Harry Belafonte.

Kyle also sings for Jayanthi and the Crybabies and the indie R&B group Gospel Machine. Kyle and Gospel Machine guitarist Wes Burdine wrote the song "Hand in Hand" in for the Million Artist Movement. The song, inspired by the deaths of Eric Garner and Michael Brown, was first performed at the Million March MN rally on December 13, 2014. "Hand in Hand" addresses both the police and elected officials; Kyle also performed the song at In the Heart of the Beast Puppet and Mask Theatre's May Day Parade in 2015 and at Black Lives Matter events. The song has become an unofficial anthem for the Minneapolis Black Lives Matter movement. Kyle was also active in protests following the death of Philando Castille, where she used her singing to process grief and deliver hope.

Kyle led the choir that sang during the first same-sex marriages in Minnesota at Minneapolis City Hall in July 2013. She also sings at funerals; Kyle cites the experiences of her youth, where she had many friends and family members pass away, as why she uses music to heal in these situations. "At a wedding, you can never sing a song beautiful enough.The singer is just part of the show and everyone is just focused on the dress or something else. At a funeral, everyone is, like, please, we need this."

== Personal life ==
Kyle is married to Robin Kyle and has three children.
