= Kile (surname) =

Kile is a surname. Notable people with the surname include:

- Darryl Kile (1968–2002), American baseball player
- Marit Velle Kile (born 1978), Norwegian actress
- Mikey Kile (born 1983), American stock car racing driver
- Pongsa Kile (1918–1990), Nanai poet and ethnographer
- Sverre Kile (born 1953), Norwegian swimmer

== See also ==
- Kyle (surname)
- Kil (surname)
