= Jeffrey Kiehl =

American climate scientist

Jeffrey Theodore Kiehl (born June 10, 1952) is an American climate scientist. He is head of the Climate Change Research Section in the National Center for Atmospheric Research located in Boulder, Colorado. He completed his atmospheric science doctoral studies at the University at Albany, SUNY.

He was awarded the 2012 Climate Communication Prize from the American Geophysical Union.

With Kevin E. Trenberth, he is notable for the "Earth's Annual Global Mean Energy Budget" and the related diagram showing the Earth's energy balance that is contained in the IPCC's AR4 WG I

== See also ==
- James Hansen
- Gavin Schmidt
- Kevin E. Trenberth
