= Kyles, Missouri =

Extinct hamlet in Missouri, U.S.

Coordinates: 37.1389404°N 90.5209490°W

Kyles is an extinct town in Wayne County, in the U.S. state of Missouri.

A post office called Kyles was established in 1892, and remained in operation until 1933. "Kyles" may have been the name of an early postmaster, according to local history.
