= Pongsa Kile =

Nanai poet

- Поӈса Киле
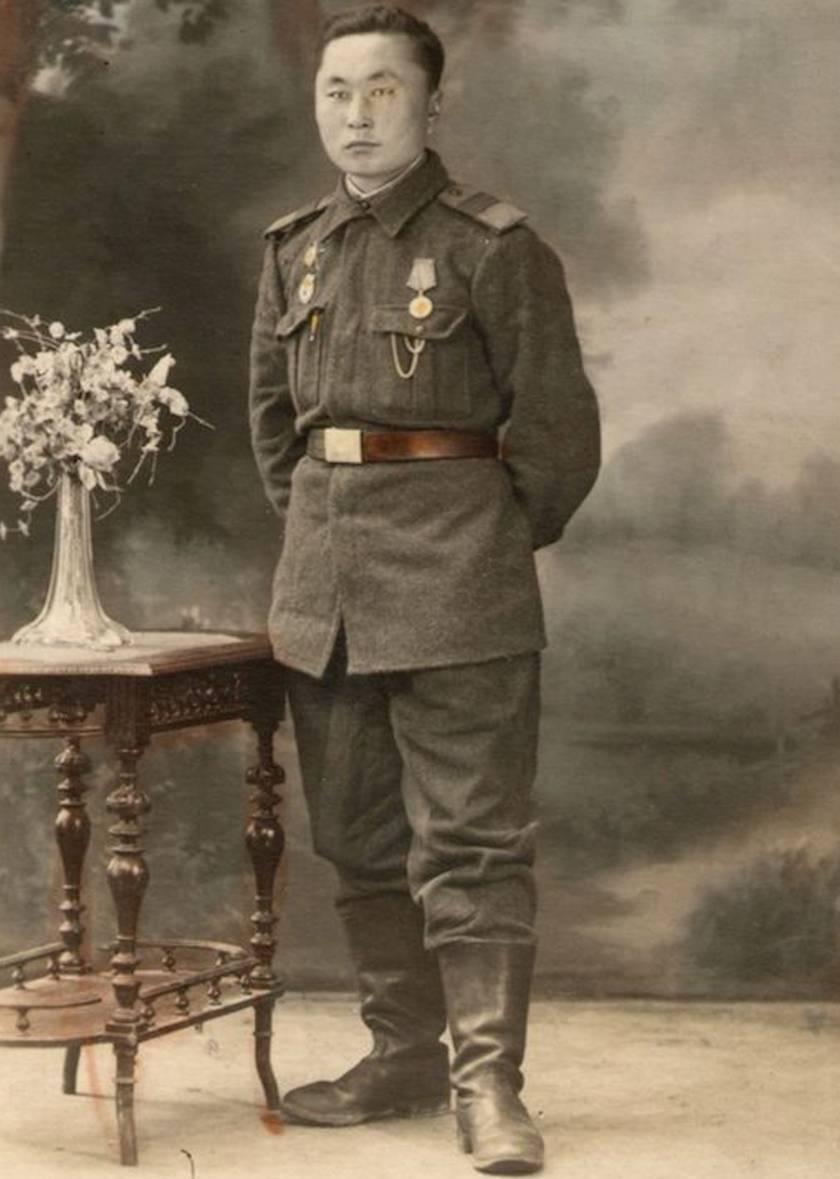
- Born: 1918; Dada village
- Died: 1990 (aged 71–72); Amursk, Soviet Union
- Resting place: Naikhin village
- Spouse: Maria Borisovna Kile
- Writing career
- Language: Nanai, Russian
- Years active: 1979–1990

Pongsa Kile (Nanai: Поӈса Киле; Russian: Понгса Константинович Киле; 1918–1990) was a Nanai poet and ethnographer of the Soviet period.

He died in 1990 in Amursk. He was buried in the village of Naikhin. According to his wife Maria Kile, her husband's will included a call to future generations to try to preserve their culture and avoid its “stylization” and distortion.

== Bibliography ==
=== Books ===
- Киле П (1993). Титарёвой Г. Т (ed.). Творческое наследие. Комсомольск-на-Амурсе: Тип. Комсомольского-на-Амуре авиационного производственного объединения.
- Киле П (1993). Пер. с нан. Кабушкина Н.; худож. Колесов А. В. (eds.). Песни сердца: Стихи [на нанайском и рус. яз.] Хабаровск: Хабаровское книжное издательство. pp. /111. ISBN 5-7663-0336-X.
- Художественное наследие Понгсы Киле (из собрания Амурского городского краеведческого музея): каталог. Амурск. 1998. pp. /35.
- Киле П (1999). Амурский гор. краевед. музей (ed.). Словами предков пою. Комсомольск-на-Амуре: КГПУ. pp. /64.
- Киле П (2000). Сост.: Киле М. Б. и др.; Пер.: Чадаева А. Я. и др. (eds.). Творческое наследие. Vol. I. Комсомольск-на-Амуре: Изд-во КнАГПУ.

- Киле П (2000). Сост.: Киле М. Б. и др.; Пер.: Чадаева А. Я. и др. (eds.). Прекрасная родина моя. Vol. II. Комсомольск-на-Амуре: Изд-во КнАГПУ. pp. /143.

- Киле П. (2007). Сост. Синицына Л.; худ.: Пассар Л., Попельский П. (eds.). Избранное. Амурск: Амурский гор. краевед. музей. pp. /91.
- Киле П. (2014). Загляни в душу мне... Амурск: Амурский гор. краевед. музей. pp. /191.

=== Publications in periodicals and collections ===
- Kile, Pongsa (1988). Напевы Дярини: "Войну со мной прошедшие..."; Адо миава; Нанайская песня; Я "эниэ" скажу; Тоямака: Стихи [Chant of Dyarini: “Those who passed the war with me...”; Ado miawa; Nanai song; I'll say "enie"; Toyamaka: Poems]. Дальний Восток (in Russian) (4). Translated by Alina Chadaeva. Preface by Alina Chadaeva: 96–99. ISSN 0130-3023.
- —— (1990). Пока дышу — пою...; Порда Пэрхи-мала хэдун; Мать Анюй-река: Стихи [While I breathe, I sing...; Porda Perhi-mala hedun; Mother Anyui River: Poems]. Дальний Восток (in Russian) (9). Translated by Alina Chadaeva: 52–53. ISSN 0130-3023.
- —— (1991). Игры моего детства [Games of my childhood]. Северные просторы (in Russian) (6): 35–37. ISSN 0233-7762.
- —— (1994). Друг-енот : Поэма [Raccoon Friend: Poem]. Слово народов Севера (in Russian) (2). Translated by Alina Chadaeva: 23.
- —— (1996). Серебряный яоко; Плач вдовы: Стихи [Silver Yaoko; The Widow's Lament: Poems]. Современная литература народов Севера и Дальнего Востока (in Russian) (2). Translated by Alina Chadaeva: 11–14.
- —— (1996). Хэрире — путешествие шамана в небо: Стихи. Слово народов Севера (in Russian) (3 [7]). Translated by Alina Chadaeva: 11.

=== Translations into foreign languages ===
- ポンサ K.キレ著. Нанайские национальные игры = ナーナイの民族遊戯 / ポンサ K.キレ著; 佐々木史郎, 匹田剛, 津曲敏郎編訳. — Otaru: Language Center of Otaru University of Commerce, 1993. — (ツングース言語文化論集, 2).

== Sources ==
- Van Deusen, Kira (2001). The Flying Tiger: Women Shamans and Storytellers of the Amur. McGill–Queen's University Press. ISBN 9780773521568.
- Chadaeva, Alina (2004). Признание в любви [Declaration of love]. Мир Севера (in Russian). 2 (3): 50–51. ISSN 1560-6864.
