= Dallas Kyle =

Personal information
- Nationality: American

Sport
- Country: United States
- Sport: Swimming
Medal record
Men's swimming
World University Games
| Gold medal – first place | 1983 Edmonton | Men's 4×100 m freestyle relay |

Dallas Kyle was an American former competitive swimmer who represented the United States at the 1983 World University Games in Edmonton, Alberta, Canada. He won a gold medal as a member of the U.S. men's 4 × 100 m freestyle relay team at the Games. A contemporary report on the 1983 Universiade described Kyle as a swimmer from the University of Tennessee and discussed his relay split during the men's 4 × 100 m freestyle relay.
