= Kil, Nacka Municipality =

Kil
- Location within Stockholm Location within Sweden Location within European Union
- Coordinates: 59°20′N 18°19′E
- Country: Sweden
- Province: Uppland
- County: Stockholm County
- Municipality: Nacka Municipality

Area
  - Total: 0.76 km^{2} (0.29 sq mi)

Population (31 December 2010)
  - Total: 731
  - Density: 966/km^{2} (2,500/sq mi)
- Time zone: UTC+1 (CET)
  - Summer (DST): UTC+2 (CEST)

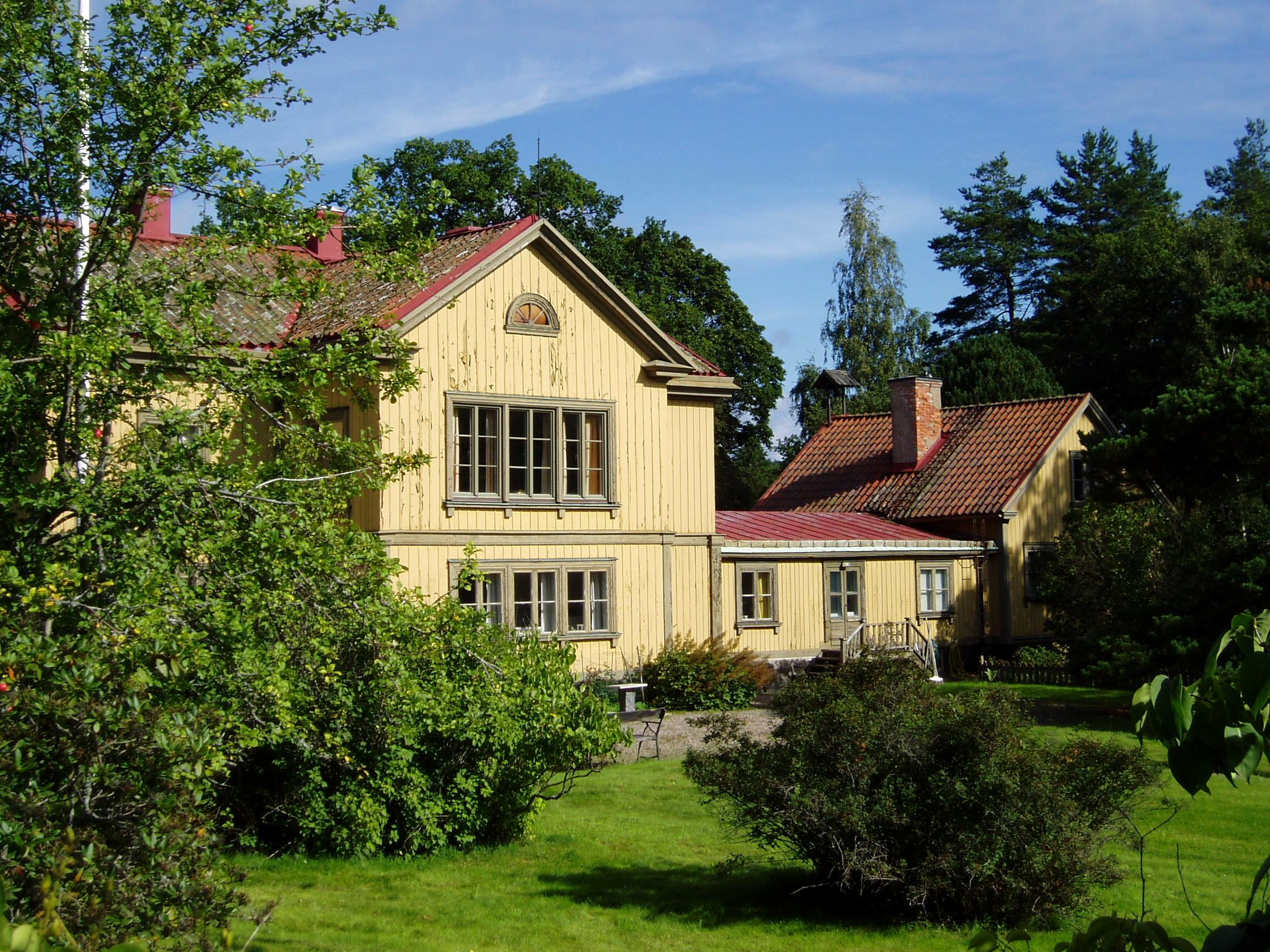
Kil mansion, Nacka Municipality, Sweden

Kil is a locality situated on the island of Värmdö in Sweden's Stockholm archipelago. From an administrative perspective, it is located in Nacka Municipality and Stockholm County, and has 731 inhabitants as of 2010.
