= Kiel (mountain) =

Mountain in Germany

Coordinates: 50°25′N 12°28′E

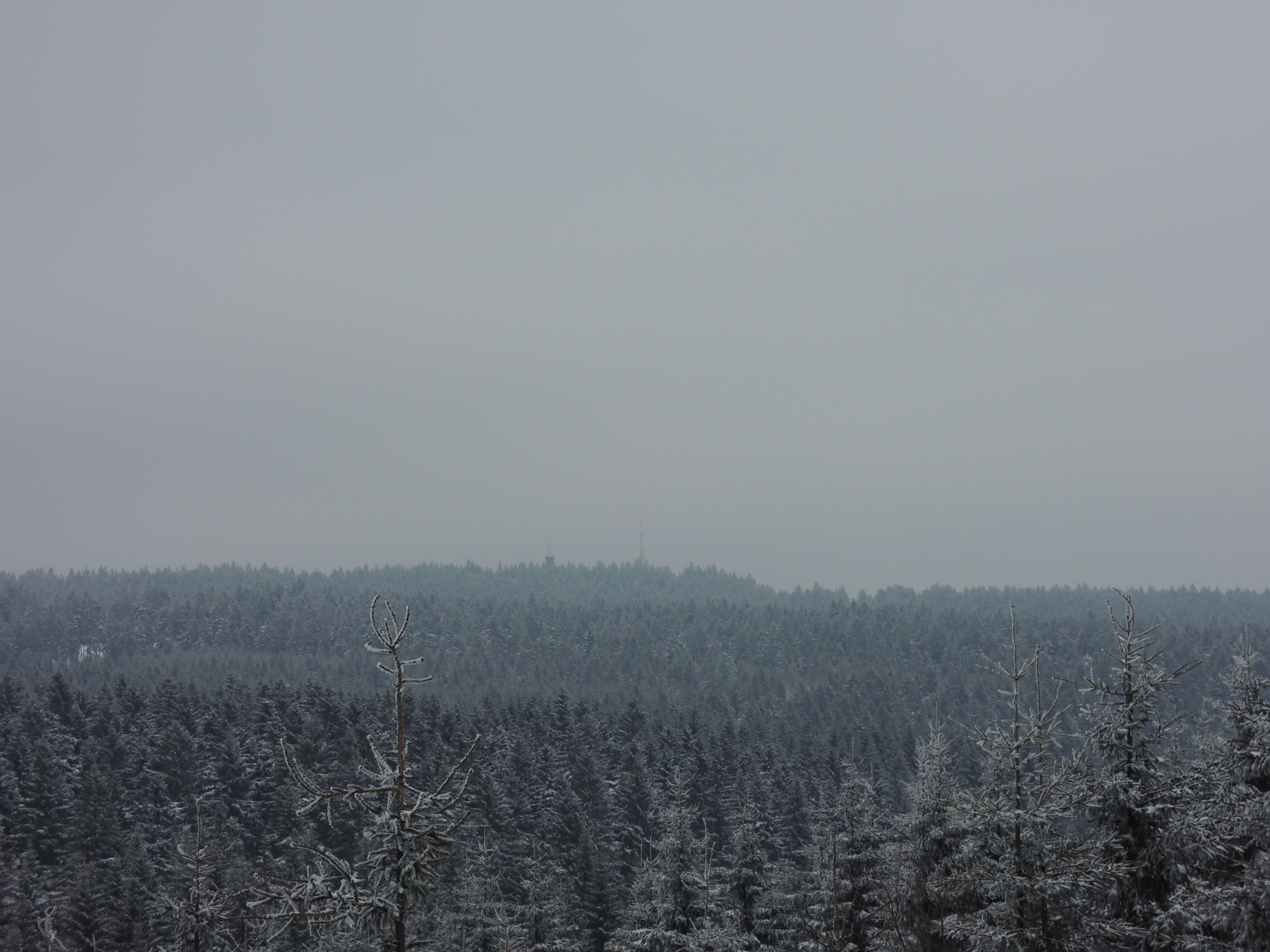
- Peak of Kiel (mountain) seen from Schneckensteiner Halde

Highest point
- Elevation: 942 m (3,091 ft)

Geography
- Location: Saxony, Germany

Kiel is a mountain of Saxony, southeastern Germany.
