= Romantica (band) =

Americana band

- Origin: Minneapolis, Minnesota, United States
- Genres: Rock, Americana, folk rock, country
- Years active: 2002 - present
- Label: 2024, Across the Pond
- Members: Ben Kyle; Tony Zaccardi; Ryan Lovan; Dave Strahan; Jayanthi Kyle; Luke Jacobs; Joe Savage; Aaron Fabbrini

Romantica are an Americana band formed in 2002 by Ben Kyle. The band's members, past and present, have come from the Minneapolis-St. Paul, Twin Cities area of Minnesota. Mixing together elements of folk, rock, and Americana, Romantica creates a rich and unique sound. The original line-up consisted of Kyle (vocals and guitar), Luke Jacobs (bass and keys), Mark Hedlund (drums) and Christopher Becknell (violin). While the group's members and contributors have changed over the years, Kyle's vision, vocals and songwriting have been the consistent thread throughout the different iterations. To date, the band has recorded four albums (Three studio, and one live session album).

== History ==
=== 2002-2006 ===
The band's first album, It's your Weakness That I Want, brings together Americana with an Irish rock flair. The album, produced by Alex Oana, won the band a Minnesota Music Academy award for Best Folk/Roots/Americana Recording in 2004. Christopher Becknell left the band during this first recording and was replaced by Jessy Greene (founding member of Geraldine Fibbers and collaborator with The Foo Fighters, Wilco and The Jayhawks). Other significant contributors to this recording included Susan Enan, Darren Jackson, and Erik Applewick of the band Tapes and Tapes. The live band, for much of this period, also included Erik Brandt, Jeremy Szopinski, and Peter Rasmussen.

=== 2007-2009 ===
Romantica's second studio recording America was produced by Ben Kyle at Slow Studios and went on to be named #58 on Paste Magazines "Top 100 Albums of 2007". James Orvis joined the band as drummer for this recording, and in addition to Kyle, Jacobs and Greene, significant contributors to the sound and shape of this project included pedal steel guitar player Eric Heywood (of Ray LaMontagne and the Pariah Dogs fame), guitarist Peter Rasmussen, and vocalist Laurie Kyle. Tony Zaccardi joined as bass guitar player after the recording. The core touring band for the next three years (2007 - 2010) was Zaccardi, James Orvis, Luke Jacobs and Kyle. While on tour in Austin, Texas at SXSW in 2009, this instantiation of Romantica wrote and recorded the album Control Alt Country Delete live, in the space of one day. Joe Savage joined 2008, frequently contributing to the live show.

=== 2010-Onwards ===
In 2010, Kyle recorded a duets album with frequent touring partner Carrie Rodriguez and toured Europe playing Romantica's music as a duo with Luke Jacobs. In 2010, James Orvis retired and was replaced by Ryan Lovan. "Danger" Dave Strahan joined as significant live contributor in the same year. In 2011 Aaron Fabbrini and Jayanthi Kyle joined the live show as well.

== Personnel ==
Over 15 musicians have performed live as a part of Romantica. Some have spent only a short time with the band, contributing to a single tour or album, while others have been long-term members with significant contributions. Kyle has been the band's lead vocalist, motivating force, and sole songwriter throughout the group's history, but a number of other musicians are closely identified with the band.

=== Current members ===
- Ben Kyle - vocals, guitar, piano (2002–present)
- Luke Jacobs - guitar, pedal steel guitar, vocals (2002–present)
- Tony Zaccardi - bass, vocals (2007–present)
- Ryan Lovan - drums (2010–present)
- "Danger" Dave Strahan - guitar (2010–present)
- Jayanthi Kyle - vocals (2011–present)
- Joe Savage - pedal steel guitar (2008–present)
- Aaron Fabbrini - pedal steel guitar (2011–present)

=== Former Members ===
- James Orvis - drums (2007-2010)
- Jessy Greene - violin (2003-2009)
- Eric Heywood - pedal steel guitar (2007)
- Mark Hedlund - drums (2002-2006)
- Peter Rasmussen - guitar (2004-2005)
- Erik Brandt - keys, accordion (2004-2007)
- Jeremy Szopinski - guitar (2004-2007)
- Laurie Kyle - vocals (2007-2009)
- Phillip Potyondy - trumpet (2007-2009)
- Christopher Becknell - violin (2002-2003)

== Discography ==
- It's Your Weakness That I Want (2004)
- America (2007)
- Control Alt Country Delete (2009)
- Shadowlands (2016)
