= Ben Kyle =

American singer-songwriter

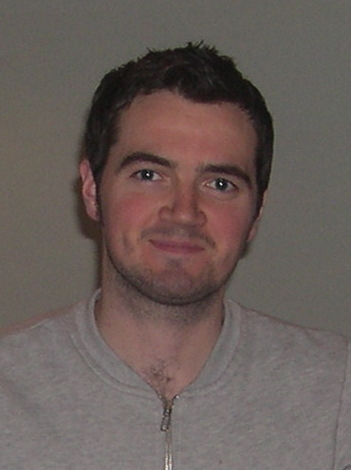
- Ben Kyle in 2008

Background information
- Born: 21 May 1981 (age 45); Belfast, Northern Ireland
- Origin: Gilnahirk, Belfast, Northern Ireland
- Genres: Americana, folk, rock
- Occupations: Musician, singer-songwriter, producer
- Instruments: Guitar, piano, vocals, harmonica, percussion
- Years active: 2002– Present
- Website: www.benkyle.com

Ben Kyle (born 21 May 1981) is an Irish-American singer-songwriter and multi-instrumentalist. He is best known as the lead singer and songwriter for the Americana band Romantica. Kyle's singing style has been compared to those of Tom Odell and Ryan Adams.

== Early life ==
Ben Kyle was born in Belfast, Northern Ireland but moved with his family to Minneapolis, Minnesota at age 13. Kyle grew up in a family of musicians and showed an interest in music from an early age.

== Career ==
=== 2002–2009: early career ===
In 2002, Kyle formed Romantica, an alternative country band with an Irish influence. Based in Minneapolis, Romantica has acquired a following in the United States while releasing three albums. Their first, It's Your Weakness That I Want, came out in 2004, bringing an Irish rock approach to the Americana genre of music. Their second album, America, brought the band more widespread recognition as Kyle's lyrics and poetic approach earned enthusiastic praise. Paste magazine ranked the album 58th on its Top 100 Albums of 2007 list. As the songwriter of the America album, Kyle won several awards at the 2007 International Songwriting Competition. In 2009, Romantica released Control Alt Country Delete which was written and recorded in a single day in Austin, Texas.

=== 2010–present ===
After the release of Romantica's third album, Kyle went on tour in Europe with Carrie Rodriguez in 2010. They performed in the Netherlands, Belgium, Germany, and the United Kingdom. Kyle and Rodriguez also recorded a duet album, We Still Love Our Country. The album has two original songs: Your Lonely Heart, by Kyle, and Fire Alarm, co-written by Kyle and Rodriguez. The other six tracks are covers of classic country songs. Both the tour and the album were well received in Europe.

In 2012, Kyle began his solo career with the release of Ben Kyle, a compilation of songs of a more personal nature. Commenting on the solo album's name, Kyle stated, "It's not like the Romantica songs were not personal, but this collection is definitely very autobiographical...." As of early 2013, Kyle was working on several musical projects as producer and arranger while also developing future Romantica and solo recordings.

=== Collaborations ===
In addition to his work with Romantica and Carrie Rodriguez, Ben Kyle has worked with Ryan Adams, Alejandro Escovedo, Lucinda Williams, Sara Watkins, and Dan Wilson.

== Discography ==
=== Romantica ===
- 2004: Its Your Weakness That I Want
- 2007: America
- 2009: Control Alt Country Delete
- 2016: Shadowlands
- 2018: Outlaws

=== Collaboration ===
- 2011: We Still Love Our Country (Duet album with Carrie Rodriguez)

=== Solo ===
- 2012: Ben Kyle
- 2015: MASSA
- 2015: MASSA Deux
