= Kil, Värmland =

Kil
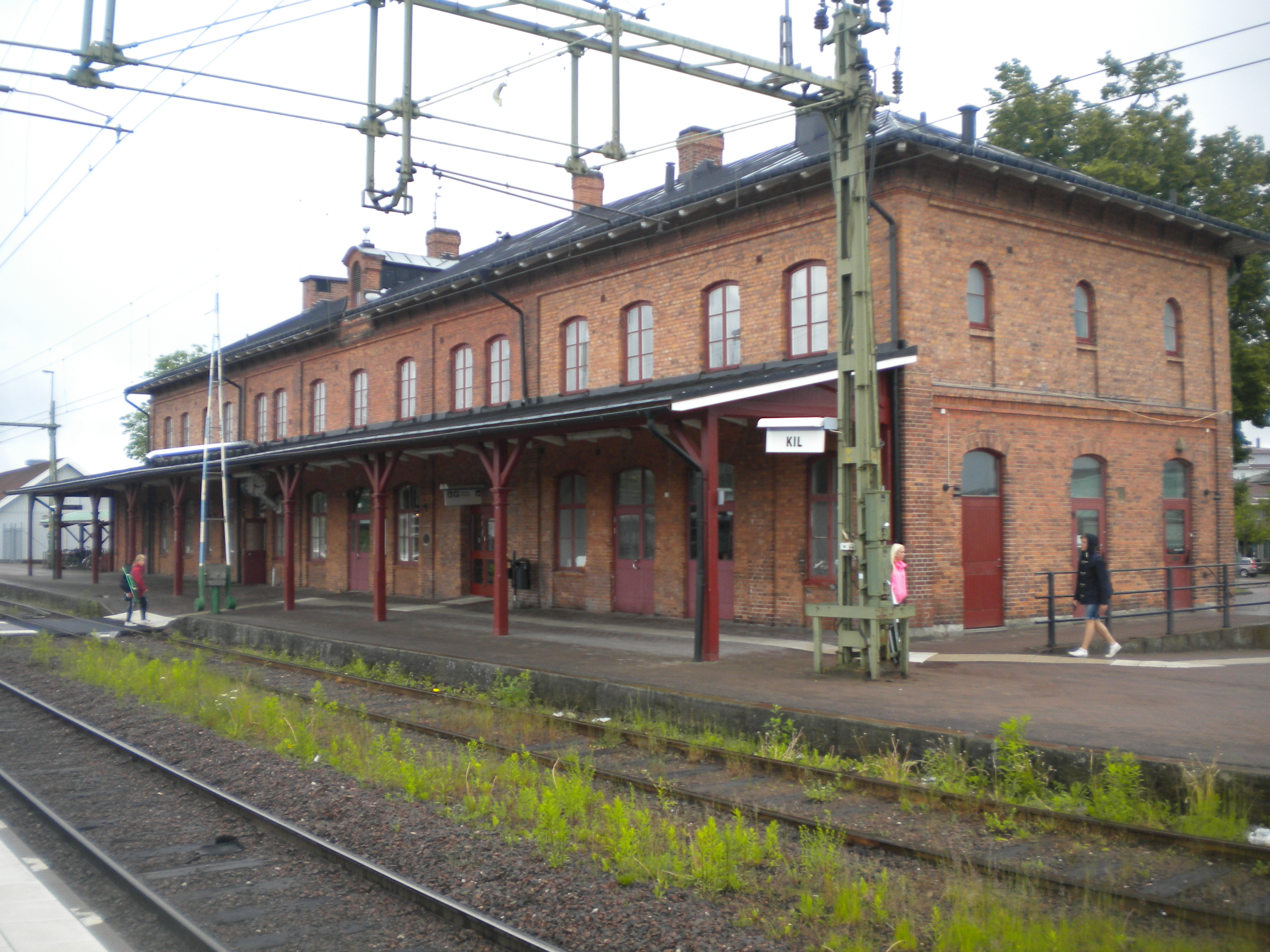
- Kil Train Station

- Location within Sweden
- Coordinates: 59°30′N 13°19′E
- Country: Sweden
- Province: Värmland
- County: Värmland County
- Municipality: Kil Municipality

Area
  - Total: 6.75 km^{2} (2.61 sq mi)

Population (31 December 2010)
  - Total: 7,842
  - Density: 1,161/km^{2} (3,010/sq mi)
- Time zone: UTC+1 (CET)
  - Summer (DST): UTC+2 (CEST)

Kil (Swedish pronunciation: [ˈɕiːl]) is a locality and the seat of Kil Municipality in Värmland County, Sweden, with 7,842 inhabitants in 2010.

It is a railway junction which unites railways from five directions, all but one having passenger services. Swedish world elite high jumper Stefan Holm competed for the Kil AIK athletics club. Per Åslund who plays for the Färjestad BK is from Kil.
