= Richard G. Kyle =

American academic, theologian and author

Richard G. Kyle is an American academic, theologian and author. He is Professor of History and Religion at Tabor College, Hillsboro, Kansas.

Kyle received theological training at both Baptist and Presbyterian divinity schools while his own church membership has been a part of the Mennonite Brethren. He holds five degrees including a doctorate from the University of New Mexico.

He has published books on The New age movement, Millennialism, John Knox and history of popular evangelicalism in the United States.

== Publications ==
- Mind of John Knox by Richard G. Kyle, Coronado Press, July (1984)
- From sect to denomination by Richard G. Kyle, Center for Mennonite Brethren Studies, 1985)
- The religious fringe by Richard G. Kyle, InterVarsity Press, (1993)
- The New Age movement in American culture by Richard G. Kyle, University Press of America, 1995)
- The last days are here again by Richard G. Kyle, Baker Books, (1998)
- The Ministry of John Knox by Richard G. Kyle, Edwin Mellen Press, (August 2002)
