= Kyl =

Kyl or KYL may refer to:

- John Kyl (1919–2002), U.S. politician
- Jon Kyl (1942–2026), U.S. politician
- Kauppakorkeakoulun Ylioppilaskunnan Laulajat, a men's choir

== See also ==
- Kyhl
- Kyle (disambiguation)
- Kyll
