= Kyll =

River in Germany

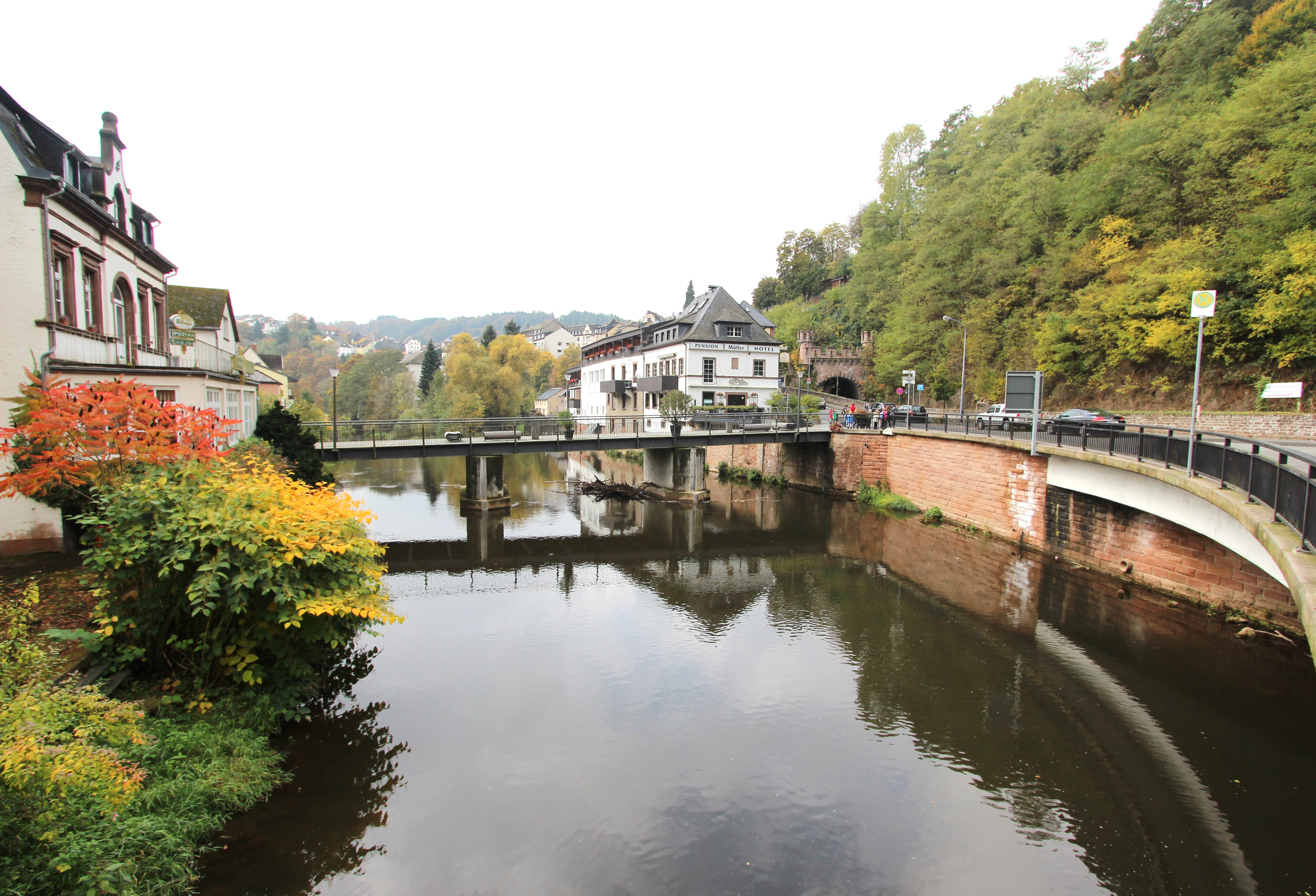
- The Kyll at the town Kyllburg

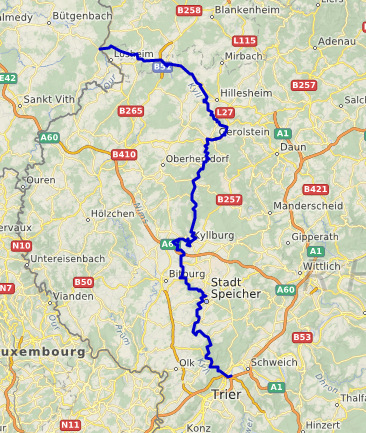

Location
- Country: Germany

Physical characteristics
- Source
  - location: Hautes Fagnes
  - elevation: ±600 m (2,000 ft)
- Mouth
  - location: Moselle
  - coordinates: 49°48′12″N 6°42′6″E
- Length: 127.6 km (79.3 mi)
- Basin size: 849 km^{2} (328 sq mi)

Basin features
- Progression: Moselle→ Rhine→ North Sea

The Kyll (German pronunciation: [ˈkɪl]), noted by the Roman poet Ausonius as Celbis, is a 128-kilometre-long (80 mi) river in western Germany (North Rhine-Westphalia and Rhineland-Palatinate), left tributary of the Moselle. It rises in the Eifel mountains, near the border with Belgium and flows generally south through the towns Stadtkyll, Gerolstein, Kyllburg and east of Bitburg. It flows into the Moselle in Ehrang, a suburb of Trier.

== In fiction ==
The river Kyll, personified as a woman named Kelly, is one of the central characters in the fantasy/crime novel "October Man", written by the author Ben Aaronovitch, in the book series Rivers of London.

== Transport ==
Kyll train stop is located at Cross Eifel Railway although right now it is out of service, also the touristic special trains are currently not running.

== See also ==
- List of rivers of North Rhine-Westphalia
- List of rivers of Rhineland-Palatinate
