= Scotland at the FIFA Women's World Cup =

The Scotland women's national football team has represented Scotland at the FIFA Women's World Cup on one occasion, in 2019. Scotland is set to co-host the 2035 tournament along with the three other countries in the United Kingdom, earning the team automatic qualification as co-host.

== FIFA Women's World Cup record ==
World Cup Finals
Year	Result	GP	W	D*	L	GF	GA	GD
1991	Did not enter							
1995	Did not qualify							
1999	Unable to qualify							
2003	Unable to qualify							
2007	Did not qualify							
2011	Did not qualify							
2015	Did not qualify							
2019	Group stage	3	0	1	2	5	7	–2
2023	Did not qualify							
2027	To be determined							
2031	To be determined							
2035	Qualified as co-host							
Total	2/12	3	0	1	2	5	7	–2

FIFA Women's World Cup history
Year	Round	Date	Opponent	Result	Stadium
2019	Group stage	9 June	England	L 1–2	Allianz Riviera, Nice
2019	Group stage	14 June	Japan	L 1–2	Roazhon Park, Rennes
2019	Group stage	19 June	Argentina	D 3–3	Parc des Princes, Paris

== 2019 FIFA Women's World Cup ==
Scotland, 20th in the March 2019 FIFA World Rankings, qualified for their first World Cup after finishing top of UEFA Group 2 ahead of Switzerland and Poland. At the draw for the finals held in France, they were placed in Group D alongside rivals England (ranked 3rd in the world, who had beaten an under-strength Scottish team 6–0 at the 2017 European Championship), Japan (ranked 7th, who won the tournament in 2011 and reached the final in 2015), and Argentina (ranked 37th, who had lost all six of their previous World Cup finals matches).

All three group matches saw the use of the newly introduced Video Assistant Referee (VAR) system feature prominently. In the opening match against England in Nice, a penalty kick was awarded against Scotland for accidental handball after a VAR review. This was converted, and England dominated play and scored again before half time. Scotland improved in the second half and scored a goal late on through Claire Emslie, but could not find an equaliser.

The second match against Japan in Rennes followed a similar pattern; this time the opponents took the lead in open play, then scored a penalty awarded via VAR for a foul to deservedly lead by two at the interval. Scotland created more in the second half and appeared to have two reasonable penalty claims in incidents involving Erin Cuthbert (a foul and handball), but no VAR reviews were carried out. Substitute Lana Clelland scored a fine goal with two minutes remaining, but a 2–1 defeat was again the final outcome.

Four third-place teams would qualify for the knockout rounds, and other results meant that either Scotland or Argentina would be likely to progress if they won their meeting in Paris. The Scots took the lead through Kim Little, and were 3–0 up with 21 minutes remaining after further goals from Jen Beattie and Cuthbert. Argentina quickly pulled two goals back, the second rebounding in off goalkeeper Lee Alexander after hitting the crossbar. With four minutes to go, Argentina were awarded a penalty for a foul challenge after a lengthy VAR review. Alexander saved the shot, but it was ordered to be re-taken when VAR indicated she had moved slightly off her line before it was struck; Argentina scored with the second attempt, with the goal timed at 94 minutes. Despite the delays, little further stoppage time was played and the match ended with the final score 3–3, eliminating both teams, with the fact Scotland had gained their first World Cup point providing no consolation in the dramatic circumstances.

=== Group D ===
Pos	Team	Pld	W	D	L	GF	GA	GD	Pts	Qualification
1	England	3	3	0	0	5	1	+4	9	Advance to knockout stage
2	Japan	3	1	1	1	2	3	−1	4	Advance to knockout stage
3	Argentina	3	0	2	1	3	4	−1	2	
4	Scotland	3	0	1	2	5	7	−2	1	

Source: FIFA
Rules for classification: Group stage tiebreakers
9 June 2019
18:00

England	2–1	Scotland
Parris 14' (pen.); White 40'	Report	Emslie 79'

Allianz Riviera, Nice
Attendance: 13,188
Referee: Jana Adámková (Czech Republic)
14 June 2019
15:00

Japan	2–1	Scotland
Iwabuchi 23'; Sugasawa 37' (pen.)	Report	Clelland 88'

Roazhon Park, Rennes
Attendance: 13,201
Referee: Lidya Tafesse (Ethiopia)
19 June 2019
21:00

Scotland	3–3	Argentina
Little 19'; Beattie 49'; Cuthbert 69'	Report	Menéndez 74'; Alexander 79' (o.g.); Bonsegundo 90+4' (pen.)

Parc des Princes, Paris
Attendance: 28,205
Referee: Ri Hyang-ok (North Korea)

== 2035 FIFA Women's World Cup ==
Scotland is set to co-host the FIFA Women's World Cup in 2035. They also automatically qualified as co-host.

== Goalscorers ==
Player	Goals	2019
Claire Emslie	1	1
Kim Little	1	1
Jen Beattie	1	1
Erin Cuthbert	1	1
Lana Clelland	1	1
Total	5	5

== Head-to-head record ==
Opponent	Pld	W	D	L	GF	GA	GD	Win %
Argentina	1	0	1	0	3	3	+0	0.00
England	1	0	0	1	1	2	−1	0.00
Japan	1	0	0	1	1	2	−1	0.00
Total	3	0	1	2	5	7	−2	0.00
