= 2019 FIFA Women's World Cup Group F =

Football tournament group stage

Group F of the 2019 FIFA Women's World Cup took place from 11 to 20 June 2019. The group consisted of Chile, Sweden, Thailand and the United States. The top two teams, the United States and Sweden, advanced to the round of 16. It was the fifth successive World Cup (and the sixth from seven tournaments played) in which Sweden and the United States were drawn together in the group stage.

== Teams ==
Draw position	Team	Pot	Confederation	Method of qualification	Date of qualification	Finals appearance	Last appearance	Previous best performance	FIFA Rankings	
Draw position	Team	Pot	Confederation	Method of qualification	Date of qualification	Finals appearance	Last appearance	Previous best performance	December 2018 (Note: The rankings of December 2018 were used for seeding for the final draw.)	March 2019
F1	United States	1	CONCACAF	CONCACAF Women's Championship champions	14 October 2018	8th	2015	Winners (1991, 1999, 2015)	1	1
F2	Thailand	3	AFC	AFC Women's Asian Cup 4th place	12 April 2018	2nd	2015	Group stage (2015)	29	34
F3	Chile	4	CONMEBOL	Copa América Femenina runners-up	22 April 2018	1st	—	Debut	38	39
F4	Sweden	2	UEFA	UEFA Group 4 winners	4 September 2018	8th	2015	Runners-up (2003)	9	9

== Standings ==
Pos	Team	Pld	W	D	L	GF	GA	GD	Pts	Qualification
1	United States	3	3	0	0	18	0	+18	9	Advance to knockout stage
2	Sweden	3	2	0	1	7	3	+4	6	Advance to knockout stage
3	Chile	3	1	0	2	2	5	−3	3	
4	Thailand	3	0	0	3	1	20	−19	0	

Source: FIFA
Rules for classification: Group stage tiebreakers

In the round of 16:

- The winners of Group F, the United States, advanced to play the runners-up of Group B, Spain.
- The runners-up of Group F, Sweden, advanced to play the runners-up of Group E, Canada.

== Matches ==
All times listed are local, CEST (UTC+2).

=== Chile vs Sweden ===
At 19:30 CEST, in the 72nd minute, the match was interrupted due to severe weather. The match resumed at 20:12 CEST.

11 June 2019
18:00

Chile	0–2	Sweden
	Report	Asllani 83'; Janogy 90+4'

Roazhon Park, Rennes
Attendance: 15,875
Referee: Lucila Venegas (Mexico)

Chile	Sweden

GK	1	Christiane Endler (c)
RB	15	Su Helen Galaz
CB	3	Carla Guerrero	(yellow card) 78'
CB	18	Camila Sáez
LB	17	Javiera Toro
CM	8	Karen Araya
CM	10	Yanara Aedo		(substituted off) 84'
CM	4	Francisca Lara
RF	20	Daniela Zamora
CF	9	María José Urrutia		(substituted off) 59'
LF	21	Rosario Balmaceda
Substitutions:
MF	11	Yessenia López	(yellow card) 90+6'	(substituted on) 59'
DF	2	Rocío Soto		(substituted on) 84'
Manager:
José Letelier

GK	1	Hedvig Lindahl
RB	4	Hanna Glas
CB	5	Nilla Fischer
CB	3	Linda Sembrant
LB	6	Magdalena Eriksson	(yellow card) 67'
CM	23	Elin Rubensson		(substituted off) 81'
CM	9	Kosovare Asllani
CM	17	Caroline Seger (c)
RF	10	Sofia Jakobsson
CF	11	Stina Blackstenius		(substituted off) 65'
LF	18	Fridolina Rolfö		(substituted off) 65'
Substitutions:
MF	19	Anna Anvegård		(substituted on) 65'
MF	8	Lina Hurtig		(substituted on) 65'
FW	7	Madelen Janogy		(substituted on) 81'
Manager:
Peter Gerhardsson

Player of the Match:
Kosovare Asllani (Sweden)

Assistant referees:
Mayte Chávez (Mexico)
Enedina Caudillo (Mexico)
Fourth official:
Marie-Soleil Beaudoin (Canada)
Reserve assistant referee:
Princess Brown (Jamaica)
Video assistant referee:
Chris Beath (Australia)
Assistant video assistant referees:
Mohammed Abdulla Hassan Mohamed (United Arab Emirates)
Kylie Cockburn (Scotland)

=== United States vs Thailand ===
The United States opened their defence of their Women's World Cup title with a 13–0 victory against Thailand, setting a new record for the largest margin of victory in the tournament's history, as well as the most goals in a match. Alex Morgan scored five times, tying a tournament and team record set by Michelle Akers for most goals scored by a player in a single World Cup match, while four of her teammates scored their first World Cup goals in their debut at the tournament. The U.S. team were later criticised for celebrating their later goals during the match, with some media commentators and former players calling it disrespectful, but the celebrations were defended by other media commentators, the team's players and members of the opposing Thai bench.

11 June 2019
21:00

United States	13–0	Thailand
Morgan 12', 53', 74', 81', 87'; Lavelle 20', 56'; Horan 32'; Mewis 50', 54'; Rapinoe 79'; Pugh 85'; Lloyd 90+2'	Report

Stade Auguste-Delaune, Reims
Attendance: 18,591
Referee: Laura Fortunato (Argentina)

United States	Thailand

GK	1	Alyssa Naeher
RB	5	Kelley O'Hara
CB	7	Abby Dahlkemper
CB	8	Julie Ertz	(substituted off) 69'
LB	19	Crystal Dunn
CM	16	Rose Lavelle	(substituted off) 57'
CM	3	Sam Mewis
CM	9	Lindsey Horan
RF	17	Tobin Heath	(substituted off) 57'
CF	13	Alex Morgan
LF	15	Megan Rapinoe (c)
Substitutions:
FW	10	Carli Lloyd	(substituted on) 57'
FW	23	Christen Press	(substituted on) 57'
FW	2	Mallory Pugh	(substituted on) 69'
Manager:
Jill Ellis

GK	18	Sukanya Chor Charoenying
RB	9	Warunee Phetwiset		(substituted off) 71'
CB	2	Kanjanaporn Saenkhun
CB	3	Natthakarn Chinwong
LB	10	Sunisa Srangthaisong
DM	5	Ainon Phancha
CM	20	Wilaiporn Boothduang		(substituted off) 35'
CM	7	Silawan Intamee
RM	21	Kanjana Sungngoen (c)
LM	12	Rattikan Thongsombut		(substituted off) 65'
CF	8	Miranda Nild
Substitutions:
MF	6	Pikul Khueanpet		(substituted on) 35'
FW	17	Taneekarn Dangda	(yellow card) 72'	(substituted on) 65'
FW	13	Orathai Srimanee		(substituted on) 71'
Manager:
Nuengrutai Srathongvian

Player of the Match:
Alex Morgan (United States)

Assistant referees:
Mariana de Almeida (Argentina)
Mary Blanco (Colombia)
Fourth official:
Claudia Umpiérrez (Uruguay)
Reserve assistant referee:
Luciana Mascaraña (Uruguay)
Video assistant referee:
Mauro Vigliano (Argentina)
Assistant video assistant referees:
José María Sánchez Martínez (Spain)
Sarah Jones (New Zealand)

=== Sweden vs Thailand ===
16 June 2019
15:00

Sweden	5–1	Thailand
Sembrant 6'; Asllani 19'; Rolfö 42'; Hurtig 81'; Rubensson 90+6' (pen.)	Report	Kanjana 90+1'

Allianz Riviera, Nice
Attendance: 9,354
Referee: Salima Mukansanga (Rwanda)

Sweden	Thailand

GK	1	Hedvig Lindahl
RB	4	Hanna Glas
CB	5	Nilla Fischer
CB	3	Linda Sembrant
LB	6	Magdalena Eriksson
CM	23	Elin Rubensson
CM	9	Kosovare Asllani
CM	17	Caroline Seger (c)	(substituted off) 69'
RF	8	Lina Hurtig
CF	19	Anna Anvegård	(substituted off) 77'
LF	18	Fridolina Rolfö	(substituted off) 46'
Substitutions:
FW	7	Madelen Janogy	(substituted on) 46'
FW	22	Olivia Schough	(substituted on) 69'
FW	20	Mimmi Larsson	(substituted on) 77'
Manager:
Peter Gerhardsson

GK	1	Waraporn Boonsing
RB	5	Ainon Phancha
CB	3	Natthakarn Chinwong	(yellow card) 90+5'
CB	19	Pitsamai Sornsai
LB	10	Sunisa Srangthaisong
DM	6	Pikul Khueanpet
CM	7	Silawan Intamee		(substituted off) 89'
CM	8	Miranda Nild
RM	17	Taneekarn Dangda	(yellow card) 45+1'
LM	12	Rattikan Thongsombut		(substituted off) 56'
CF	21	Kanjana Sungngoen (c)
Substitutions:
FW	13	Orathai Srimanee		(substituted on) 56'	(substituted off) 81'
MF	15	Orapin Waenngoen			(substituted on) 81'
MF	11	Sudarat Chuchuen		(substituted on) 89'
Manager:
Nuengrutai Srathongvian

Player of the Match:
Kosovare Asllani (Sweden)

Assistant referees:
Bernadettar Kwimbira (Malawi)
Lidwine Rakotozafinoro (Madagascar)
Fourth official:
Katalin Kulcsár (Hungary)
Reserve assistant referee:
Katalin Török (Hungary)
Video assistant referee:
Felix Zwayer (Germany)
Assistant video assistant referees:
Paolo Valeri (Italy)
Sarah Jones (New Zealand)

=== United States vs Chile ===
The United States fielded a reserve squad with seven changes to the starting lineup to rest its players ahead of the final group stage match against Sweden. Carli Lloyd scored in the 11th minute from the edge of the penalty area and Julie Ertz added a second with a header on a corner kick in the 26th minute. Lloyd scored her second goal of the match in the 35th minute, heading in another corner kick, and missed a penalty kick in the 81st minute that would have given her a hat-trick. Chilean goalkeeper Christiane Endler made several major saves as her team was outshot 26–1, and was named the player of the match for her efforts. With her brace, Carli Lloyd set a new record for most consecutive World Cup appearances with a goal, having scored six matches in a row (starting in the 2015 knockout stage), surpassing the record of German forward Birgit Prinz from 2003.

16 June 2019
18:00

United States	3–0	Chile
Lloyd 11', 35'; Ertz 26'	Report

Parc des Princes, Paris
Attendance: 45,594
Referee: Riem Hussein (Germany)

United States	Chile

GK	1	Alyssa Naeher
RB	11	Ali Krieger
CB	7	Abby Dahlkemper		(substituted off) 82'
CB	4	Becky Sauerbrunn
LB	12	Tierna Davidson
CM	6	Morgan Brian
CM	8	Julie Ertz		(substituted off) 46'
CM	9	Lindsey Horan	(yellow card) 23'	(substituted off) 59'
RF	23	Christen Press
CF	10	Carli Lloyd (c)
LF	2	Mallory Pugh
Substitutions:
FW	22	Jessica McDonald		(substituted on) 46'
MF	20	Allie Long	(yellow card) 88'	(substituted on) 59'
DF	14	Emily Sonnett		(substituted on) 82'
Manager:
Jill Ellis

GK	1	Christiane Endler (c)
RB	15	Su Helen Galaz	(yellow card) 90+4'
CB	3	Carla Guerrero
CB	18	Camila Sáez
LB	17	Javiera Toro
CM	6	Claudia Soto		(substituted off) 46'
CM	8	Karen Araya
CM	4	Francisca Lara	(yellow card) 76'	(substituted off) 89'
RF	20	Daniela Zamora
CF	9	María José Urrutia		(substituted off) 68'
LF	21	Rosario Balmaceda
Substitutions:
MF	11	Yessenia López		(substituted on) 46'
FW	19	Yessenia Huenteo	(yellow card) 80'	(substituted on) 68'
MF	14	Daniela Pardo		(substituted on) 89'
Manager:
José Letelier

Player of the Match:
Christiane Endler (Chile)

Assistant referees:
Kylie Cockburn (Scotland)
Mihaela Țepușă (Romania)
Fourth official:
Esther Staubli (Switzerland)
Reserve assistant referee:
Susanne Küng (Switzerland)
Video assistant referee:
Clément Turpin (France)
Assistant video assistant referees:
Drew Fischer (Canada)
Maryna Striletska (Ukraine)

=== Sweden vs United States ===
20 June 2019
21:00

Sweden	0–2	United States
	Report	Horan 3'; Andersson 50' (o.g.)

Stade Océane, Le Havre
Attendance: 22,418
Referee: Anastasia Pustovoitova (Russia)

Sweden	United States

GK	1	Hedvig Lindahl
RB	15	Nathalie Björn
CB	13	Amanda Ilestedt
CB	3	Linda Sembrant
LB	2	Jonna Andersson
DM	9	Kosovare Asllani		(substituted off) 79'
CM	16	Julia Zigiotti Olme
CM	17	Caroline Seger (c)		(substituted off) 63'
RM	10	Sofia Jakobsson	(yellow card) 87'
LM	22	Olivia Schough		(substituted off) 56'
CF	11	Stina Blackstenius
Substitutions:
FW	18	Fridolina Rolfö		(substituted on) 56'
DF	4	Hanna Glas		(substituted on) 63'
MF	8	Lina Hurtig		(substituted on) 79'
Manager:
Peter Gerhardsson

GK	1	Alyssa Naeher
RB	5	Kelley O'Hara	(yellow card) 59'
CB	7	Abby Dahlkemper
CB	4	Becky Sauerbrunn
LB	19	Crystal Dunn
CM	3	Sam Mewis
CM	16	Rose Lavelle		(substituted off) 63'
CM	9	Lindsey Horan
RF	17	Tobin Heath
CF	13	Alex Morgan (c)		(substituted off) 46'
LF	15	Megan Rapinoe		(substituted off) 83'
Substitutions:
FW	10	Carli Lloyd		(substituted on) 46'
FW	23	Christen Press		(substituted on) 63'
FW	2	Mallory Pugh		(substituted on) 83'
Manager:
Jill Ellis

Player of the Match:
Tobin Heath (United States)

Assistant referees:
Ekaterina Kurochkina (Russia)
Petruța Iugulescu (Romania)
Fourth official:
Esther Staubli (Switzerland)
Reserve assistant referee:
Susanne Küng (Switzerland)
Video assistant referee:
Danny Makkelie (Netherlands)
Assistant video assistant referees:
Chris Beath (Australia)
Chrysoula Kourompylia (Greece)

=== Thailand vs Chile ===
20 June 2019
21:00

Thailand	0–2	Chile
	Report	Waraporn 48' (o.g.); Urrutia 80'

Roazhon Park, Rennes
Attendance: 13,567
Referee: Anna-Marie Keighley (New Zealand)

Thailand	Chile

GK	1	Waraporn Boonsing	(yellow card) 85'
RB	9	Warunee Phetwiset		(substituted off) 90+1'
CB	3	Natthakarn Chinwong
CB	19	Pitsamai Sornsai	(yellow card) 59'
LB	10	Sunisa Srangthaisong
DM	5	Ainon Phancha
CM	6	Pikul Khueanpet
CM	8	Miranda Nild
RM	12	Rattikan Thongsombut		(substituted off) 58'
LM	7	Silawan Intamee		(substituted off) 73'
CF	21	Kanjana Sungngoen (c)
Substitutions:
MF	15	Orapin Waenngoen		(substituted on) 58'
MF	11	Sudarat Chuchuen		(substituted on) 73'
DF	2	Kanjanaporn Saenkhun		(substituted on) 90+1'
Manager:
Nuengrutai Srathongvian

GK	1	Christiane Endler (c)
RB	2	Rocío Soto
CB	3	Carla Guerrero
CB	18	Camila Sáez
LB	4	Francisca Lara
DM	8	Karen Araya	(substituted off) 46'
CM	10	Yanara Aedo
CM	11	Yessenia López
RM	20	Daniela Zamora
LM	21	Rosario Balmaceda
CF	9	María José Urrutia
Substitutions:
FW	13	Javiera Grez	(substituted on) 46'	(substituted off) 88'
FW	7	María José Rojas		(substituted on) 88'
Manager:
José Letelier

Player of the Match:
María José Urrutia (Chile)

Assistant referees:
Sarah Jones (New Zealand)
Maria Salamasina (Samoa)
Fourth official:
Gladys Lengwe (Zambia)
Reserve assistant referee:
Bernadettar Kwimbira (Malawi)
Video assistant referee:
Paolo Valeri (Italy)
Assistant video assistant referees:
Drew Fischer (Canada)
Mihaela Țepușă (Romania)

== Discipline ==
Fair play points would have been used as tiebreakers in the group if the overall and head-to-head records of teams were tied, or if teams had the same record in the ranking of third-placed teams. These were calculated based on yellow and red cards received in all group matches as follows:

- first yellow card: minus 1 point;
- indirect red card (second yellow card): minus 3 points;
- direct red card: minus 4 points;
- yellow card and direct red card: minus 5 points;

Only one of the above deductions were applied to a player in a single match.

Team	Match 1				Match 2				Match 3				Points
Team	Yellow card	(yellow card) (yellow-red card)	Red card	(yellow card) (red card)	Yellow card	(yellow card) (yellow-red card)	Red card	(yellow card) (red card)	Yellow card	(yellow card) (yellow-red card)	Red card	(yellow card) (red card)	Points
Sweden	1								1				−2
United States					2				1				−3
Chile	2				3								−5
Thailand	1				2				2				−5

== See also ==
- Chile at the FIFA Women's World Cup
- Sweden at the FIFA Women's World Cup
- Thailand at the FIFA Women's World Cup
- United States at the FIFA Women's World Cup
