= Chile at the FIFA Women's World Cup =

The Chile women's national football team has represented Chile at the FIFA Women's World Cup at one staging of the tournament, in 2019.

== FIFA Women's World Cup record ==
World Cup Finals
Year	Result	Pld	W	D*	L	GF	GA	GD
(China) 1991	Did not qualify							
(Sweden) 1995	Did not qualify							
(United States) 1999	Did not qualify							
(United States) 2003	Did not qualify							
(China) 2007	Did not qualify							
(Germany) 2011	Did not qualify							
(Canada) 2015	Did not qualify							
(France) 2019	Group stage	3	1	0	2	2	5	−3
(Australia) (New Zealand) 2023	Did not qualify							
(Brazil) 2027	Did not qualify							
(Costa Rica) (Jamaica) (Mexico) (United States) 2031	To be determined							
(United Kingdom) 2035	To be determined							
Total	1/12	3	1	0	2	2	5	−3

FIFA Women's World Cup history
Year	Round	Date	Opponent	Result	Stadium
(France) 2019	Group stage	11 June	Sweden	L 0–2	Roazhon Park, Rennes
(France) 2019	Group stage	16 June	United States	L 0–3	Parc des Princes, Paris
(France) 2019	Group stage	20 June	Thailand	W 2–0	Roazhon Park, Rennes

=== Record by opponent ===
FIFA Women's World Cup matches (by team)
Opponent	Pld	W	D	L	GF	GA
Sweden	1	0	0	1	0	2
Thailand	1	1	0	0	2	0
United States	1	0	0	1	0	3

== 2019 FIFA Women's World Cup ==
=== Group F ===
Pos	Team	Pld	W	D	L	GF	GA	GD	Pts	Qualification
1	United States	3	3	0	0	18	0	+18	9	Advance to knockout stage
2	Sweden	3	2	0	1	7	3	+4	6	Advance to knockout stage
3	Chile	3	1	0	2	2	5	−3	3	
4	Thailand	3	0	0	3	1	20	−19	0	

Source: FIFA
Rules for classification: Group stage tiebreakers
11 June 2019
18:00

Chile	0–2	Sweden
	Report	Asllani 83'; Janogy 90+4'

Roazhon Park, Rennes
Attendance: 15,875
Referee: Lucila Venegas (Mexico)

16 June 2019
18:00

United States	3–0	Chile
Lloyd 11', 35'; Ertz 26'	Report

Parc des Princes, Paris
Attendance: 45,594
Referee: Riem Hussein (Germany)

20 June 2019
21:00

Thailand	0–2	Chile
	Report	Waraporn 48' (o.g.); Urrutia 80'

Roazhon Park, Rennes
Attendance: 13,567
Referee: Anna-Marie Keighley (New Zealand)

== Goalscorers ==
Player	Goals	2019
María José Urrutia	1	1
Own goals	1	1
Total	2	2
