= 2019 FIFA Women's World Cup Group D =

Women's association football tournament

Group D of the 2019 FIFA Women's World Cup took place from 9 to 19 June 2019. The group consisted of Argentina, England, 2015 finalists Japan and debutants Scotland. The top two teams, England and Japan, advanced to the round of 16. It was the third occasion in four editions of the World Cup in which England and Japan were drawn together at the group stage (in the other, 2015, they met in the semi-finals).

== Teams ==
Draw position	Team	Pot	Confederation	Method of qualification	Date of qualification	Finals appearance	Last appearance	Previous best performance	FIFA Rankings	
Draw position	Team	Pot	Confederation	Method of qualification	Date of qualification	Finals appearance	Last appearance	Previous best performance	December 2018 (Note: The rankings of December 2018 were used for seeding for the final draw.)	March 2019
D1	England	1	UEFA	UEFA Group 1 winners	31 August 2018	5th	2015	Third place (2015)	4	3
D2	Scotland	3	UEFA	UEFA Group 2 winners	4 September 2018	1st	—	Debut	20	20
D3	Argentina	4	CONMEBOL	CONCACAF v CONMEBOL play-off winners	13 November 2018	3rd	2007	Group stage (2003, 2007)	36	37
D4	Japan	2	AFC	AFC Women's Asian Cup champions	13 April 2018	8th	2015	Winners (2011)	8	7

== Standings ==
Pos	Team	Pld	W	D	L	GF	GA	GD	Pts	Qualification
1	England	3	3	0	0	5	1	+4	9	Advance to knockout stage
2	Japan	3	1	1	1	2	3	−1	4	Advance to knockout stage
3	Argentina	3	0	2	1	3	4	−1	2	
4	Scotland	3	0	1	2	5	7	−2	1	

Source: FIFA
Rules for classification: Group stage tiebreakers

In the round of 16:

- The winners of Group D, England, advanced to play the third-placed team of Group E, Cameroon.
- The runners-up of Group D, Japan, advanced to play the winners of Group E, the Netherlands.

== Matches ==
All times listed are local, CEST (UTC+2).

=== England vs Scotland ===
9 June 2019
18:00

England	2–1	Scotland
Parris 14' (pen.); White 40'	Report	Emslie 79'

Allianz Riviera, Nice
Attendance: 13,188
Referee: Jana Adámková (Czech Republic)

England	Scotland

GK	1	Karen Bardsley
RB	2	Lucy Bronze
CB	5	Steph Houghton (c)
CB	6	Millie Bright	(substituted off) 55'
LB	3	Alex Greenwood
CM	4	Keira Walsh
CM	10	Fran Kirby	(substituted off) 82'
CM	8	Jill Scott
RF	7	Nikita Parris
CF	18	Ellen White
LF	22	Beth Mead	(substituted off) 71'
Substitutions:
DF	15	Abbie McManus	(substituted on) 55'
MF	20	Karen Carney	(substituted on) 71'
MF	19	Georgia Stanway	(substituted on) 82'
Manager:
Phil Neville

GK	1	Lee Alexander
RB	15	Sophie Howard		(substituted off) 75'
CB	4	Rachel Corsie (c)
CB	5	Jen Beattie	(yellow card) 43'
LB	3	Nicola Docherty	(yellow card) 47'	(substituted off) 55'
DM	8	Kim Little
CM	16	Christie Murray		(substituted off) 87'
CM	9	Caroline Weir
RM	11	Lisa Evans
LM	18	Claire Emslie
CF	22	Erin Cuthbert
Substitutions:
DF	2	Kirsty Smith		(substituted on) 55'
DF	14	Chloe Arthur		(substituted on) 75'
MF	23	Lizzie Arnot		(substituted on) 87'
Manager:
Shelley Kerr

Player of the Match:
Nikita Parris (England)

Assistant referees:
Lucie Ratajová (Czech Republic)
Mária Súkeníková (Slovakia)
Fourth official:
Anastasia Pustovoitova (Russia)
Reserve assistant referee:
Sanja Rođak-Karšić (Croatia)
Video assistant referee:
Felix Zwayer (Germany)
Assistant video assistant referees:
Paweł Gil (Poland)
Ekaterina Kurochkina (Russia)

=== Argentina vs Japan ===
10 June 2019
18:00

Argentina	0–0	Japan
	Report

Parc des Princes, Paris
Attendance: 25,055
Referee: Stéphanie Frappart (France)

Argentina	Japan

GK	1	Vanina Correa
RB	13	Virginia Gómez
CB	2	Agustina Barroso
CB	6	Aldana Cometti
LB	3	Eliana Stábile
DM	16	Lorena Benítez	(substituted off) 79'
CM	8	Ruth Bravo	(substituted off) 64'
CM	14	Miriam Mayorga
RM	10	Estefanía Banini (c)
LM	11	Florencia Bonsegundo	(substituted off) 77'
CF	9	Sole Jaimes
Substitutions:
MF	5	Vanesa Santana	(substituted on) 64'
MF	19	Mariana Larroquette	(substituted on) 77'
MF	17	Mariela Coronel	(substituted on) 79'
Manager:
Carlos Borrello

GK	18	Ayaka Yamashita
RB	22	Risa Shimizu	(yellow card) 38'
CB	4	Saki Kumagai (c)
CB	12	Moeka Minami
LB	3	Aya Sameshima
RM	7	Emi Nakajima		(substituted off) 74'
CM	6	Hina Sugita	(yellow card) 45+1'
CM	17	Narumi Miura
LM	14	Yui Hasegawa
CF	9	Yuika Sugasawa		(substituted off) 90'
CF	20	Kumi Yokoyama		(substituted off) 57'
Substitutions:
FW	8	Mana Iwabuchi	(yellow card) 85'	(substituted on) 57'
FW	19	Jun Endo		(substituted on) 74'
MF	13	Saori Takarada		(substituted on) 90'
Manager:
Asako Takakura

Player of the Match:
Estefanía Banini (Argentina)

Assistant referees:
Manuela Nicolosi (France)
Michelle O'Neill (Republic of Ireland)
Fourth official:
Anna-Marie Keighley (New Zealand)
Reserve assistant referee:
Sarah Jones (New Zealand)
Video assistant referee:
Clément Turpin (France)
Assistant video assistant referees:
Carlos del Cerro Grande (Spain)
Kathryn Nesbitt (United States)

=== Japan vs Scotland ===
14 June 2019
15:00

Japan	2–1	Scotland
Iwabuchi 23'; Sugasawa 37' (pen.)	Report	Clelland 88'

Roazhon Park, Rennes
Attendance: 13,201
Referee: Lidya Tafesse (Ethiopia)

Japan	Scotland

GK	18	Ayaka Yamashita
RB	22	Risa Shimizu
CB	4	Saki Kumagai (c)
CB	5	Nana Ichise
LB	3	Aya Sameshima	(yellow card) 19'
RM	7	Emi Nakajima
CM	17	Narumi Miura
CM	6	Hina Sugita
LM	19	Jun Endo		(substituted off) 66'
CF	9	Yuika Sugasawa
CF	8	Mana Iwabuchi		(substituted off) 81'
Substitutions:
FW	11	Rikako Kobayashi		(substituted on) 66'
MF	14	Yui Hasegawa		(substituted on) 81'
Manager:
Asako Takakura

GK	1	Lee Alexander
RB	2	Kirsty Smith
CB	4	Rachel Corsie (c)	(yellow card) 36'
CB	5	Jen Beattie
LB	7	Hayley Lauder
RM	11	Lisa Evans		(substituted off) 85'
CM	8	Kim Little
CM	9	Caroline Weir
LM	23	Lizzie Arnot		(substituted off) 60'
CF	22	Erin Cuthbert
CF	13	Jane Ross		(substituted off) 76'
Substitutions:
FW	18	Claire Emslie		(substituted on) 60'
FW	19	Lana Clelland		(substituted on) 76'
FW	20	Fiona Brown		(substituted on) 85'
Manager:
Shelley Kerr

Player of the Match:
Mana Iwabuchi (Japan)

Assistant referees:
Mary Njoroge (Kenya)
Queency Victoire (Mauritius)
Fourth official:
Gladys Lengwe (Zambia)
Reserve assistant referee:
Princess Brown (Jamaica)
Video assistant referee:
Massimiliano Irrati (Italy)
Assistant video assistant referees:
Drew Fischer (Canada)
Oleksandra Ardasheva (Ukraine)

=== England vs Argentina ===
14 June 2019
21:00

England	1–0	Argentina
Taylor 62'	Report

Stade Océane, Le Havre
Attendance: 20,294
Referee: Qin Liang (China)

England	Argentina

GK	13	Carly Telford
RB	2	Lucy Bronze
CB	5	Steph Houghton (c)
CB	15	Abbie McManus
LB	3	Alex Greenwood
CM	22	Beth Mead		(substituted off) 81'
CM	16	Jade Moore	(yellow card) 45+2'
CM	8	Jill Scott
RF	10	Fran Kirby		(substituted off) 89'
CF	9	Jodie Taylor
LF	7	Nikita Parris		(substituted off) 87'
Substitutions:
MF	19	Georgia Stanway		(substituted on) 81'
DF	17	Rachel Daly		(substituted on) 87'
MF	20	Karen Carney		(substituted on) 89'
Manager:
Phil Neville

GK	1	Vanina Correa
RB	4	Adriana Sachs
CB	2	Agustina Barroso	(yellow card) 69'
CB	6	Aldana Cometti	(yellow card) 39'
LB	3	Eliana Stábile
DM	14	Miriam Mayorga
CM	8	Ruth Bravo
CM	16	Lorena Benítez		(substituted off) 77'
RM	10	Estefanía Banini (c)		(substituted off) 68'
LM	11	Florencia Bonsegundo
CF	9	Sole Jaimes		(substituted off) 90'
Substitutions:
MF	19	Mariana Larroquette		(substituted on) 68'
MF	5	Vanesa Santana		(substituted on) 77'
FW	7	Yael Oviedo		(substituted on) 90'
Manager:
Carlos Borrello

Player of the Match:
Vanina Correa (Argentina)

Assistant referees:
Fang Yan (China)
Kim Kyoung-min (South Korea)
Fourth official:
Ri Hyang-ok (North Korea)
Reserve assistant referee:
Hong Kum-nyo (North Korea)
Video assistant referee:
Felix Zwayer (Germany)
Assistant video assistant referees:
Sascha Stegemann (Germany)
Katrin Rafalski (Germany)

=== Japan vs England ===
19 June 2019
21:00

Japan	0–2	England
	Report	White 14', 84'

Allianz Riviera, Nice
Attendance: 14,319
Referee: Claudia Umpiérrez (Uruguay)

Japan	England

GK	18	Ayaka Yamashita
RB	22	Risa Shimizu
CB	4	Saki Kumagai (c)
CB	5	Nana Ichise
LB	3	Aya Sameshima
RM	11	Rikako Kobayashi	(substituted off) 62'
CM	7	Emi Nakajima
CM	6	Hina Sugita
LM	19	Jun Endo	(substituted off) 85'
CF	20	Kumi Yokoyama	(substituted off) 61'
CF	8	Mana Iwabuchi
Substitutions:
FW	9	Yuika Sugasawa	(substituted on) 61'
MF	17	Narumi Miura	(substituted on) 62'
MF	13	Saori Takarada	(substituted on) 85'
Manager:
Asako Takakura

GK	1	Karen Bardsley
RB	2	Lucy Bronze
CB	5	Steph Houghton (c)
CB	6	Millie Bright
LB	12	Demi Stokes
CM	8	Jill Scott
CM	4	Keira Walsh	(substituted off) 72'
CM	19	Georgia Stanway	(substituted off) 74'
RF	17	Rachel Daly
CF	18	Ellen White
LF	11	Toni Duggan	(substituted off) 83'
Substitutions:
MF	16	Jade Moore	(substituted on) 72'
MF	20	Karen Carney	(substituted on) 74'
FW	7	Nikita Parris	(substituted on) 83'
Manager:
Phil Neville

Player of the Match:
Ellen White (England)

Assistant referees:
Luciana Mascaraña (Uruguay)
Mónica Amboya (Ecuador)
Fourth official:
María Carvajal (Chile)
Reserve assistant referee:
Queency Victoire (Mauritius)
Video assistant referee:
Carlos del Cerro Grande (Spain)
Assistant video assistant referees:
José María Sánchez Martínez (Spain)
Leslie Vasquez (Chile)

=== Scotland vs Argentina ===
19 June 2019
21:00

Scotland	3–3	Argentina
Little 19'; Beattie 49'; Cuthbert 69'	Report	Menéndez 74'; Alexander 79' (o.g.); Bonsegundo 90+4' (pen.)

Parc des Princes, Paris
Attendance: 28,205
Referee: Ri Hyang-ok (North Korea)

Scotland	Argentina

GK	1	Lee Alexander	(yellow card) 90+3'
RB	2	Kirsty Smith		(substituted off) 86'
CB	4	Rachel Corsie (c)
CB	5	Jen Beattie
LB	3	Nicola Docherty
CM	8	Kim Little
CM	10	Leanne Crichton
CM	9	Caroline Weir	(yellow card) 86'
RF	11	Lisa Evans		(substituted off) 86'
CF	22	Erin Cuthbert	(yellow card) 85'
LF	18	Claire Emslie
Substitutions:
DF	15	Sophie Howard		(substituted on) 86'
FW	20	Fiona Brown		(substituted on) 86'
Manager:
Shelley Kerr

GK	1	Vanina Correa
RB	8	Ruth Bravo
CB	2	Agustina Barroso
CB	6	Aldana Cometti
LB	3	Eliana Stábile
RM	19	Mariana Larroquette	(yellow card) 75'
CM	5	Vanesa Santana		(substituted off) 82'
CM	16	Lorena Benítez
LM	11	Florencia Bonsegundo
CF	10	Estefanía Banini (c)		(substituted off) 60'
CF	9	Sole Jaimes		(substituted off) 70'
Substitutions:
FW	22	Milagros Menéndez		(substituted on) 60'
MF	20	Dalila Ippólito		(substituted on) 70'
MF	14	Miriam Mayorga		(substituted on) 82'
Manager:
Carlos Borrello

Player of the Match:
Erin Cuthbert (Scotland)

Assistant referees:
Hong Kum-nyo (North Korea)
Kim Kyoung-min (South Korea)
Fourth official:
Lidya Tafesse (Ethiopia)
Reserve assistant referee:
Makoto Bozono (Japan)
Video assistant referee:
Bastian Dankert (Germany)
Assistant video assistant referees:
Drew Fischer (Canada)
Katrin Rafalski (Germany)

== Discipline ==
Fair play points would have been used as tiebreakers in the group if the overall and head-to-head records of teams were tied, or if teams had the same record in the ranking of third-placed teams. These were calculated based on yellow and red cards received in all group matches as follows:

- first yellow card: minus 1 point;
- indirect red card (second yellow card): minus 3 points;
- direct red card: minus 4 points;
- yellow card and direct red card: minus 5 points;

Only one of the above deductions were applied to a player in a single match.

Team	Match 1				Match 2				Match 3				Points
Team	Yellow card	(yellow card) (yellow-red card)	Red card	(yellow card) (red card)	Yellow card	(yellow card) (yellow-red card)	Red card	(yellow card) (red card)	Yellow card	(yellow card) (yellow-red card)	Red card	(yellow card) (red card)	Points
England					1								−1
Argentina					2				1				−3
Japan	3				1								−4
Scotland	2				1				3				−6

== See also ==
- Argentina at the FIFA Women's World Cup
- England at the FIFA Women's World Cup
- Japan at the FIFA Women's World Cup
- Scotland at the FIFA Women's World Cup
