= Ian Toro =

Chilean footballer

Personal information
- Full name: Ian Ronaldo Toro Ibarra
- Date of birth: 24 December 2002 (age 23)
- Place of birth: Tocopilla, Chile
- Height: 1.67 m (5 ft 6 in)
- Position: Left-back

Team information
- Current team: Las Zocas
- Number: 22

Youth career
- 2016: Universidad Católica
- 2016–2020: O'Higgins
- 2020–2021: Universidad Católica

Senior career*
Years	Team	Apps	(Gls)
2020–2024	Universidad Católica	0	(0)
2021–2023	→ Deportes Copiapó (loan)	46	(0)
2025	Rangers	3	(0)
2026	Marino	–	(–)
2026–	Las Zocas	0	(0)
- * Club domestic league appearances and goals as of 9 January 2026

Ian Ronaldo Toro Ibarra (born 24 December 2002) is a Chilean footballer who plays as a left-back for Spanish club Las Zocas.

== Club career ==
Born in Tocopilla, Chile, Toro briefly joined the Universidad Católica under-15 team before joining the O'Higgins youth ranks. Later, he returned to Universidad Católica at under-17 level and was promoted to the first team by Ariel Holan in 2020.

In May 2021, Toro was loaned out to Deportes Copiapó. The next season, they got promotion to the top division and Toro continued with them in the 2023 Chilean Primera División.

Back to Universidad Católica for the 2024 season, Toro made an appearance in the 0–2 away win against Glorias Navales for the 2022 Copa Chile.

In 2025, Toro signed with Rangers de Talca. On 29 August of the same year, he suffered a serious car accident alongside his fellow Martín Díaz.

Following Rangers, Toro moved to Spain and joined Marino. Later, he switched to UD Las Zocas.

== Personal life ==
Ian is the younger brother of the Chile international footballer Javiera Toro.
