= Lana Clelland =

Scottish footballer

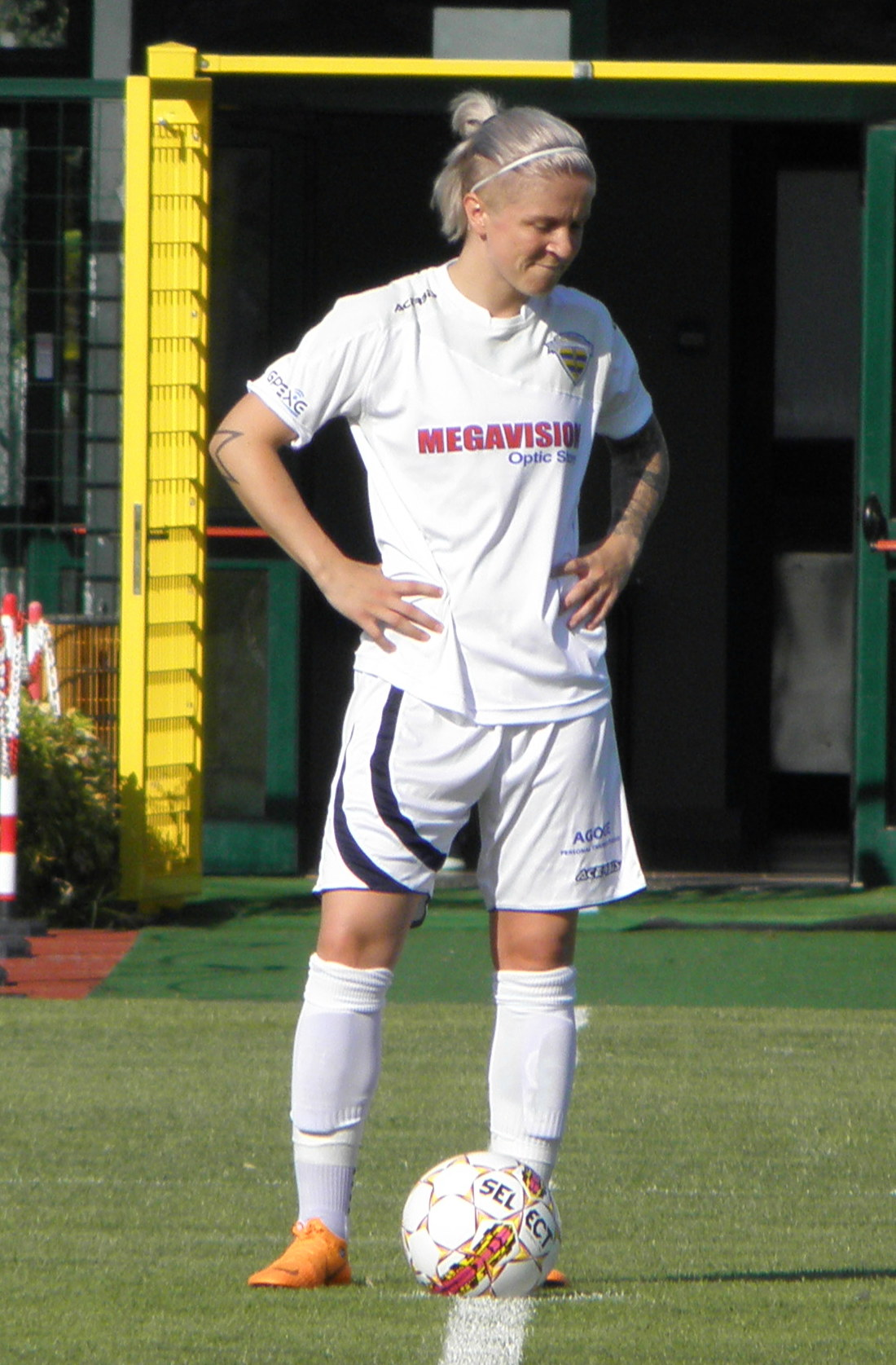
- Clelland with UPC Tavagnacco in 2018

Personal information
- Date of birth: 26 January 1993 (age 33)
- Place of birth: Perth, Scotland
- Height: 1.69 m (5 ft 7 in)
- Positions: Midfielder; forward

Team information
- Current team: Sassuolo
- Number: 26

Youth career
- Letham Girls
- St Johnstone Girls
- Rangers

Senior career*
Years	Team	Apps	(Gls)
2008–2011	Rangers	36	(21)
2011–2014	Spartans	35	(21)
2014–2015	ASD Pink Bari	16	(10)
2015–2018	Tavagnacco	50	(44)
2018–2021	Fiorentina	35	(13)
2021–	Sassuolo	72	(35)

International career^{‡}
2008	Scotland U15	1	(0)
2008–2010	Scotland U17	13	(3)
2010–2012	Scotland U19	16	(12)
2012–	Scotland	40	(5)
- * Club domestic league appearances and goals as of 28 June 2025 ‡ National team caps and goals as of 8 April 2023

Lana Clelland (born 26 January 1993) is a Scottish professional footballer who plays for Sassuolo in the Italian women's Serie A as well as the Scotland women's national team. She is the highest foreign goalscorer in the history of Italian women's club football.

== Club career ==
Born in Perth where she attended Perth Grammar School, Clelland began her career at local clubs (youth teammates included future international teammate Lisa Evans) before joining Rangers where she made her senior Scottish Women's Premier League debut. Clelland joined Spartans during the 2011 summer break.

In December 2014, she signed a professional contract with ASD Pink Bari in the Italian women's Serie A. In June 2015, Clelland transferred to Tavagnacco and in 2016–17 was the highest goal scorer in the Serie A, emulating her compatriot Rose Reilly. After her 2017–18 season was disrupted by a heel injury, Clelland joined Fiorentina in July 2018. In her first season with La Viola, the team defeated reigning league champions Juventus to win the Supercoppa, but lost the Coppa Italia final and finished runners-up in Serie A to the same opponents.

Clelland moved to Sassuolo in July 2021.

She is the highest scoring foreign player in Serie A Femminile history with 99 goals.

== International career ==
Clelland has appeared for the Scotland women's national team at all age group levels, beginning with the under-15 side in 2008. Having continued as a prolific scorer at under-19 level, she made her full Scotland debut in July 2012 against Cameroon. She was selected in the Scotland squads for the UEFA Women's Euro 2017 and 2019 FIFA Women's World Cup tournaments.

== Career statistics ==
=== International appearances ===
As of the match played on 11 April 2023

National team	Year	Apps	Goals
Scotland	2012	1	0
Scotland	2013	3	1
Scotland	2014	1	0
Scotland	2015	5	0
Scotland	2016	1	0
Scotland	2017	9	1
Scotland	2018	2	0
Scotland	2019	4	2
Scotland	2020	—	
Scotland	2021	6	0
Scotland	2022	8	1
Total		40	5

=== International goals ===
Results list Scotland's goal tally first.

#	Date	Venue	Opponent	Score	Result	Competition
1.	21 August 2013	FSS Sports Centre, Stara Pazova	Serbia	1–1	1–1	Friendly
2.	14 September 2017	Telki Training Centre, Telki	Hungary	1–0	3–0	Friendly
3.	21 January 2019	La Manga Stadium, La Manga	Iceland	1–2	1–2	Friendly
4.	14 June 2019	Roazhon Park, Rennes	Japan	1–2	1–2	2019 FIFA World Cup
5.	16 February 2022	Pinatar Arena, San Pedro del Pinatar	Wales	1–0	1–3	2022 Pinatar Cup
