= María José Urrutia =

Chilean footballer (born 1993)

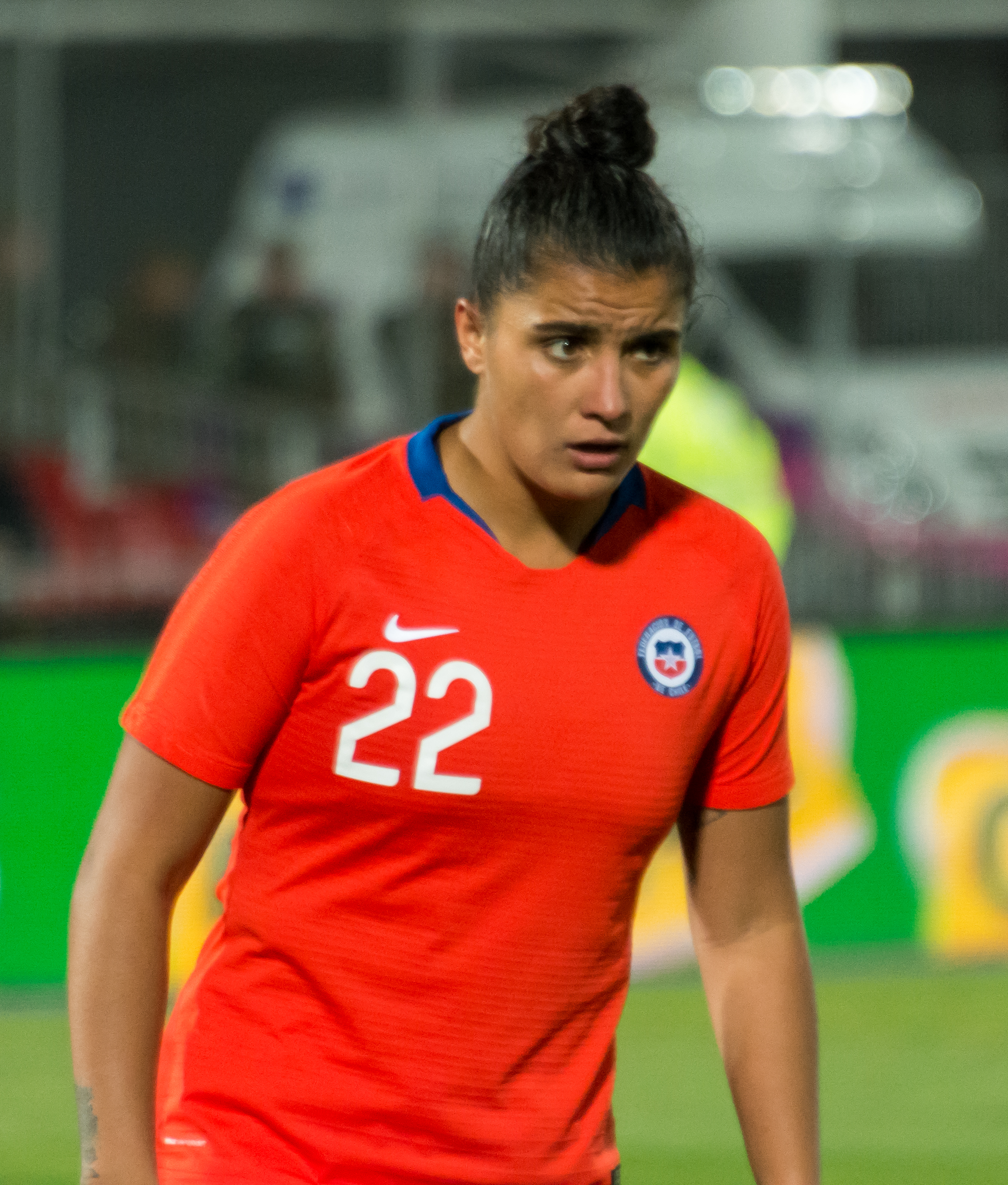
- Urrutia with Chile in 2019

Personal information
- Full name: María José Urrutia Sánchez
- Date of birth: 17 December 1993 (age 32)
- Place of birth: Chile
- Height: 1.71 m (5 ft 7 1/2 in)
- Positions: Forward; midfielder

Team information
- Current team: Colo-Colo
- Number: 9

Senior career*
Years	Team	Apps	(Gls)
2010–2018	Universidad Católica		
2018	Palestino		
2019	3B da Amazônia		
2019–2020	Palestino		
2021–	Colo-Colo		

International career^{‡}
2010	Chile U17	2	(0)
2018–	Chile	10	(1)
Medal record
Women's football
Representing Chile
Pan American Games
Silver medal – second place	2023 Santiago	Team
- * Club domestic league appearances and goals ‡ National team caps and goals as of 13 November 2018

María José Urrutia Sánchez (born 17 December 1993) is a Chilean footballer who plays as a forward for Colo-Colo and the Chile women's national team.

== International career ==
Urrutia represented Chile at the 2010 FIFA U-17 Women's World Cup.

She represented Chile at the 2023 Pan American Games, where Chile won the silver medal. She performed as goalkeeper in the gold medal match due to the fact that there were no goalkeepers in the squad.

== Personal life ==
Urrutia has a daughter, whom she gave birth to in 2014.

She got civil union with the also footballer Maryorie Hernández on 15 May 2023. Hernández got pregnant with twins in 2025.

== Honours ==
Colo-Colo

- Primera División (5): 2022, 2023, 2024, 2025, 2026

Chile

- Copa América Runner-up: 2018
- Turkish Women's Cup: 2020
- Pan American Games Silver Medal: 2023

Individual

- Premios El Gráfico - Best Women's Player: 2018
- Premios Contragolpe - Best Goal: 2021
- Premios Contragolpe - Ideal Team: 2021
- CPD - Best Women's Footballer: 2023

== International goals ==
Scores and results list Chile's goal tally first.

No.	Date	Venue	Opponent	Score	Result	Competition
1.	19 May 2019	Estadio Nacional Julio Martínez Prádanos, Santiago, Chile	Colombia	1–0	2–2	Friendly
2.	20 June 2019	Roazhon Park, Rennes, France	Thailand	2–0	2–0	2019 FIFA Women's World Cup
3.	28 November 2021	Arena da Amazônia, Manaus, Brazil	India	1–0	3–0	2021 International Women's Football Tournament of Manaus
4.	28 October 2023	Estadio Elías Figueroa Brander, Valparaíso, Chile	Jamaica	5–0	6–0	2023 Pan American Games
5.	29 May 2024	Estadio Cementos Progreso, Guatemala City, Guatemala	Guatemala	2–1	4–3	Friendly
6.	29 May 2024	Estadio Cementos Progreso, Guatemala City, Guatemala	Guatemala	3–2	4–3	Friendly
