= Javiera Toro =

Chilean footballer (born 1998)

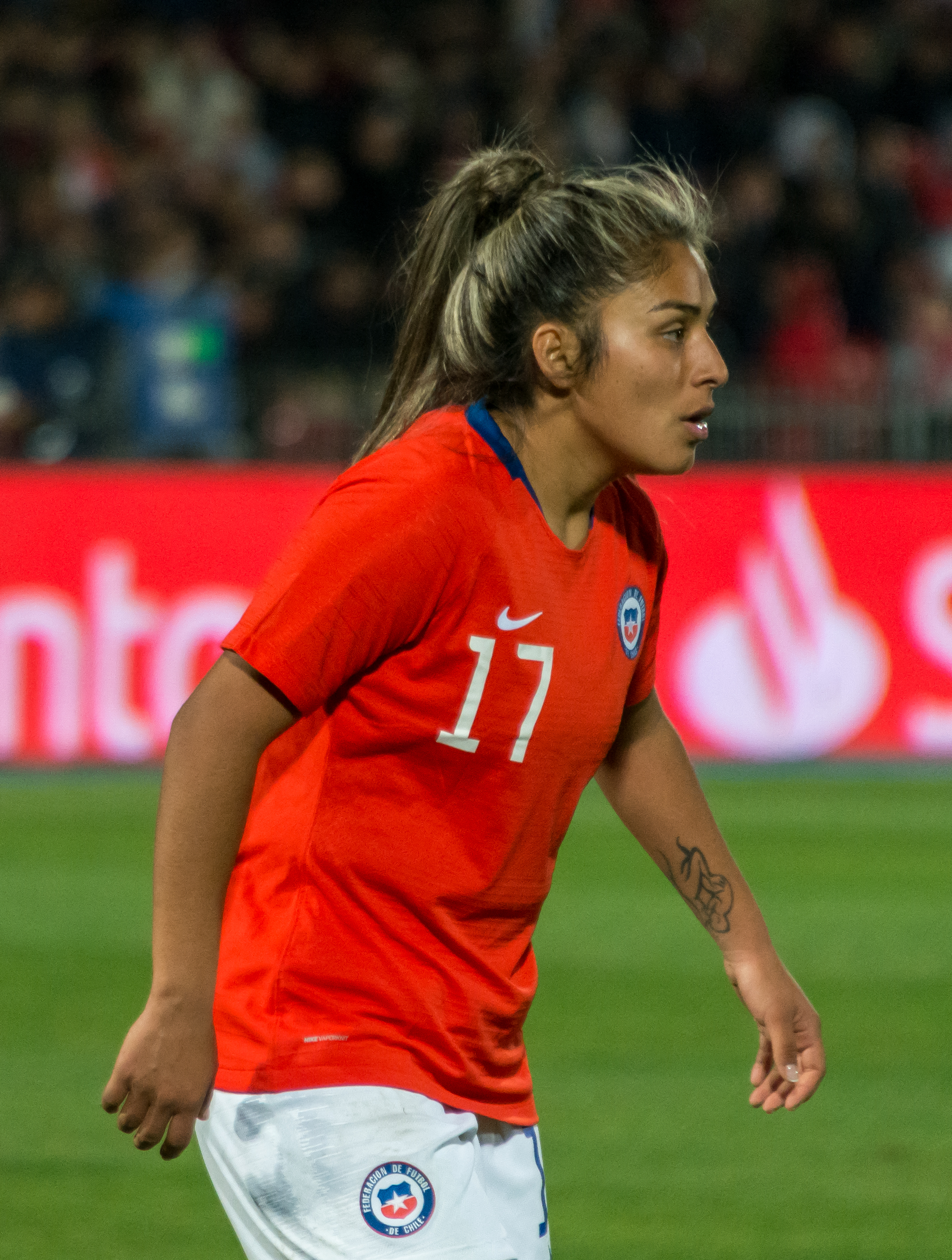
- Toro with Chile in 2019

Personal information
- Full name: Javiera Paz Toro Ibarra
- Date of birth: 22 April 1998 (age 28)
- Place of birth: Tocopilla, Chile
- Height: 1.59 m (5 ft 3 in)
- Position: Defender

Team information
- Current team: Real Unión Tenerife
- Number: 23

Senior career*
Years	Team	Apps	(Gls)
2017–2018	Palestino		
2019	Santiago Morning		
2020	Colo-Colo		
2020–2022	Sevilla	40	(0)
2022–2024	Granadilla Tenerife	12	(0)
2024–2025	Cacereño	25	(2)
2025–2026	Alhama ElPozo	3	(0)
2026–	Real Unión Tenerife	0	(0)

International career^{‡}
2018	Chile U20		
2019–	Chile	5	(0)
- * Club domestic league appearances and goals as of 5 December 2023 ‡ National team caps and goals as of 28 February 2019

Javiera Paz Toro Ibarra (born 22 April 1998) is a Chilean professional footballer who plays as a defender for Spanish club Real Unión de Tenerife.

== Club career ==
In July 2022, she moved to UDG Tenerife from Sevilla.

In the second half of 2024, Toro signed with CP Cacereño. On 4 July 2025, she switched to Alhama ElPozo.

In July 2026, Toro signed with Real Unión de Tenerife.

== International career ==
At under-20 level, she was part of the Chile squad at the 2018 South American Games.

== Personal life ==
She is the older sister of the professional footballer Ian Toro.
