= Kylie Cockburn =

Scottish association football referee

Kylie McMullan
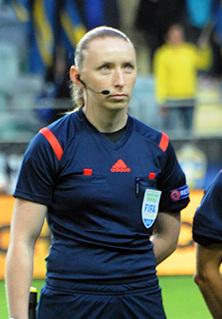
- McMullan at a pre-match ceremony, 2015
- Full name: Kylie Margaret McMullan
- Born: Kylie Margaret McMullan; 1 December 1988 (age 37); Scotland
- Other occupation: Police officer

Domestic
Years	League	Role
2010–2021	Scottish Professional Football League	Assistant Referee

International
Years	League	Role
2013–2021	FIFA listed	Assistant Referee

Kylie Margaret McMullan; born 1 December 1988) is a Scottish football match official who officiates generally in the role of assistant referee in the Scottish Professional Football League. She has also been appointed to matches in the UEFA Women's Champions League and the FIFA Women's World Cup. Cockburn was appointed to the FIFA list of women assistant referees in 2013. She received media attention when she became the first female match official at a top-division men's match in Scotland in 2014.

== Career ==
Raised in Baillieston, Cockburn had ambitions to be a football player when young, and was involved in the Scotland women's national football team at youth level while playing in the Scottish Women's Premier League including spells at Queen's Park and Hibernian. However, she began to find it difficult to balance her training and match schedule with the demands of her chosen career as a police officer, and realising she was unlikely to succeed at the very top of the women's game where professional contracts were available, dropped out of playing but decided to take up refereeing as a way of staying involved in the sport, beginning her training at the age of 21.

Having officiated at women's domestic matches, and in the early stages of the UEFA Women's Champions League from 2012, her appointments in the men's Scottish Professional Football League lower divisions commenced at the start of the 2013–14 season. By the end of that campaign, her performances were considered good enough for her to run the line in a Scottish Premiership fixture between Hearts and St Mirren, making history as the first female official to be involved in a men's top-tier match in Scotland (several other milestones were set by Morag Pirie during the previous decade).

At that time, Cockburn was still appointed to minor leagues such as in the Juniors, but over the subsequent years took part in an increasing number of top-level league matches in Scotland as well as relegation playoffs, in the later stages of the Women's Champions League, and FIFA Women's World Cup qualification and UEFA Women's Championship qualification matches at international level.

She was among the assistants selected for the 2016 UEFA Women's Under-19 Championship in Slovakia, 2016 FIFA U-17 Women's World Cup in Jordan and the 2018 FIFA U-17 Women's World Cup in Uruguay, and in December 2018 was selected for the upcoming 2019 FIFA Women's World Cup in France the following June, the only Scottish official to be involved. At the finals, she assisted on the field at three matches and was also in the Video Assistant Referee review room at two others, which she described as "biggest and most enjoyable experience of my refereeing career".

== See also ==
- List of football referees
