= Lidya Tafesse =

Ethiopian international football referee

- Full name: Lidya Tafesse Abebe
- Born: 30 April 1980 (age 46); Ethiopia

International
Years	League	Role

Lidya Tafesse Abebe (born 30 April 1980) is an international football referee from Ethiopia. She is an official at the 2019 FIFA Women's World Cup in France.
