= 2019 FIFA Women's World Cup =

Women's football tournament

Coupe du Monde Féminine de la FIFA – France 2019

Tournament details
- Host country: France
- Dates: 7 June – 7 July
- Teams: 24 (from 6 confederations)
- Venues: 9 (in 9 host cities)

Final positions
- Champions: United States (4th title)
- Runners-up: Netherlands
- Third place: Sweden
- Fourth place: England

Tournament statistics
- Matches played: 52
- Goals scored: 146 (2.81 per match)
- Attendance: 1,131,312 (21,756 per match)
- Top scorer(s): (England) Ellen White (United States) Alex Morgan (United States) Megan Rapinoe (6 goals each)
- Best player: (United States) Megan Rapinoe
- Best young player: (Germany) Giulia Gwinn
- Best goalkeeper: (Netherlands) Sari van Veenendaal
- Fair play award: France

The 2019 FIFA Women's World Cup was the eighth edition of the FIFA Women's World Cup, the quadrennial international Women's football championship contested by 24 women's national teams representing member associations of FIFA. It took place between 7 June and 7 July 2019, with 52 matches staged in nine cities in France, which was awarded the right to host the event in March 2015, the first time the country hosted the tournament. The tournament was the first Women's World Cup to use the video assistant referee (VAR) system. This was the second and last edition with 24 teams before expanding to 32 teams for the 2023 tournament in Australia and New Zealand.

The United States entered the competition as defending champions after winning the 2015 edition and successfully defended their title, with a 2–0 victory over the Netherlands in the final. In doing so, they secured their record fourth title and became the second nation, after Germany, to have successfully retained the title. Unlike Germany, however, this victory held a distinction as the United States won both 2015 and 2019 tournaments under one manager, Jill Ellis. It was the first time in 81 years since Vittorio Pozzo did so for the Italian men's team at the 1934 and 1938 FIFA World Cups.

The matches were broadcast globally and attracted a combined audience of 1.12 billion people.

== Host selection ==
On 6 March 2014, FIFA announced that bidding had begun for the 2019 FIFA Women's World Cup. Member associations interested in hosting the tournament had to submit a declaration of interest by 15 April 2014, and provide the complete set of bidding documents by 31 October 2014. As a principle, FIFA preferred the 2019 Women's World Cup and the 2018 FIFA U-20 Women's World Cup to be hosted by the same member association, but reserved the right to award the hosting of the events separately.

Initially, five countries indicated interest in hosting the events: France, England, South Korea, New Zealand and South Africa. Both England and New Zealand registered expressions of interest by the April 2014 deadline, but in June 2014 it was announced that each would no longer proceed. South Africa registered an expression of interest by the April 2014 deadline; but later decided to withdraw prior to the final October deadline. Both Japan and Sweden had also expressed interest in bidding for the 2019 tournament, but Japan chose to focus on the 2019 Rugby World Cup and the 2020 Summer Olympics, whilst Sweden decided to focus on European U-17 competitions instead. France and South Korea made official bids for hosting the tournament by submitting their documents by 31 October 2014.

On 19 March 2015, France officially won the bid to host the Women's World Cup and the U-20 Women's World Cup. The decision came after a vote by the FIFA Executive Committee. Upon the selection, France became the third European nation to host the Women's World Cup (following Sweden and Germany), and the fourth country to host both the men's and women's World Cup, having hosted the men's tournament in 1938 and 1998. By the time France hosted the women's World Cup, the country had also earlier hosted the UEFA Euro 2016, which served as a precursor for France's preparation to host this competition.

| Vote | First ballot |
|---|---|
| France | 17 |
| South Korea | 5 |

== Qualification ==
The slot allocation was approved by the FIFA Council on 13–14 October 2016. The slots for each confederation were unchanged from those of the previous tournament, except the slot for the hosts was moved from CONCACAF (Canada) to UEFA (France).

- AFC (Asia): 5 slots
- CAF (Africa): 3 slots
- CONCACAF (North America, Central America and the Caribbean): 3 slots
- CONMEBOL (South America): 2 slots
- OFC (Oceania): 1 slot
- UEFA (Europe): 8 slots
- Host nation: 1 slot
- CONCACAF–CONMEBOL play-off: 1 slot

Qualifying matches started on 3 April 2017 and ended on 1 December 2018.

=== Qualified teams ===
A total of 24 teams qualified for the final tournament. Each team's FIFA Rankings in March 2019 are shown in parentheses.

AFC (5)

- Australia (6)
- China (16)
- Japan (7)
- South Korea (14)
- Thailand (34)

CAF (3)

- Cameroon (46)
- Nigeria (38)
- South Africa (49) (debut)

CONCACAF (3)

- Canada (5)
- Jamaica (53) (debut)
- United States (1)

CONMEBOL (3)

- Argentina (37)
- Brazil (10)
- Chile (39) (debut)

OFC (1)

- New Zealand (19)

UEFA (9)

- England (3)
- France (4) (hosts)
- Germany (2)
- Italy (15)
- Netherlands (8)
- Norway (12)
- Scotland (20) (debut)
- Spain (13)
- Sweden (9)

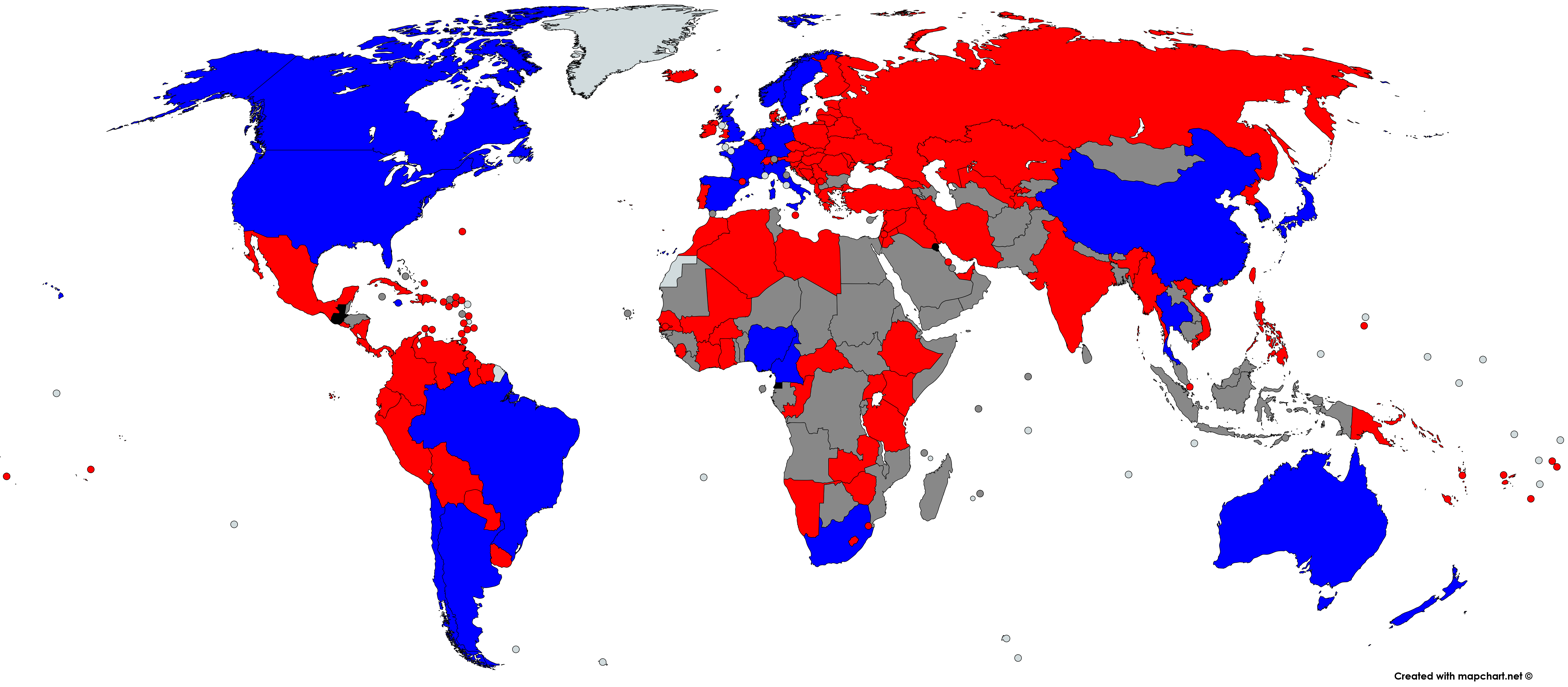
Teams qualified for World Cup Teams failed to qualify for World Cup Teams expelled from the tournament by FIFA Teams did not enter qualification

Chile, Jamaica, Scotland and South Africa made their Women's World Cup debuts, while Italy took part in the event for the first time since 1999 and Argentina took part for the first time since 2007. Brazil, Germany, Japan, Nigeria, Norway, Sweden and the United States qualified for their eighth World Cup, continuing their streak of qualifying for every World Cup held so far.

== Venues ==
Twelve cities were candidates. The final nine stadiums were chosen on 14 June 2017; Stade de la Beaujoire in Nantes, Stade Marcel-Picot in Nancy, and Stade de l'Abbé-Deschamps in Auxerre were cut.

The semi-finals and final were played at Parc Olympique Lyonnais in the Lyon suburb of Décines-Charpieu, with 58,000 capacity, while the opening match was played at Parc des Princes in Paris. The 2019 tournament is the first under the 24-team format to be played without double-header fixtures.

| Lyon (Décines-Charpieu) | Paris | Nice | Rennes |
|---|---|---|---|
| Parc Olympique Lyonnais (Stade de Lyon) | Parc des Princes | Allianz Riviera (Stade de Nice) | Roazhon Park |
| Capacity: 57,900 | Capacity: 45,600 | Capacity: 35,100 | Capacity: 28,600 |
| Le Havre | Location of the host cities of the 2019 FIFA Women's World Cup. | | |
| Stade Océane | Location of the host cities of the 2019 FIFA Women's World Cup. | | |
| Capacity: 24,000 | Location of the host cities of the 2019 FIFA Women's World Cup. | | |
| Valenciennes | Reims | Montpellier | Grenoble |
| Stade du Hainaut | Stade Auguste-Delaune | Stade de la Mosson | Stade des Alpes |
| Capacity: 22,600 | Capacity: 20,500 | Capacity: 19,300 | Capacity: 18,000 |

== Match officials ==
On 3 December 2018, FIFA announced the list of 27 referees and 48 assistant referees for the tournament. On 4 June 2019, FIFA announced that Canadian referee Carol Anne Chenard and Chinese assistant referee Cui Yongmei had pulled out for "health reasons."

On 15 March 2019, the FIFA Council approved the use of the video assistant referee (VAR) system for the first time in a FIFA Women's World Cup tournament. The technology was previously deployed at the 2018 FIFA World Cup in Russia. The fifteen male VAR officials were announced by FIFA on 2 May 2019.

French referee Stéphanie Frappart was in charge for the final between the United States and the Netherlands.

Referees
| Confederation | Referee |
|---|---|
| AFC | Kate Jacewicz (Australia) |
| AFC | Qin Liang (China) |
| AFC | Casey Reibelt (Australia) |
| AFC | Ri Hyang-ok (North Korea) |
| AFC | Yoshimi Yamashita (Japan) |
| CAF | Salima Mukansanga (Rwanda) |
| CAF | Lidya Tafesse (Ethiopia) |
| CONCACAF | Marie-Soleil Beaudoin (Canada) |
| CONCACAF | Melissa Borjas (Honduras) |
| CONCACAF | Lucila Venegas (Mexico) |
| CONMEBOL | Edina Alves Batista (Brazil) |
| CONMEBOL | María Carvajal (Chile) |
| CONMEBOL | Laura Fortunato (Argentina) |
| CONMEBOL | Claudia Umpiérrez (Uruguay) |
| OFC | Anna-Marie Keighley (New Zealand) |
| UEFA | Jana Adámková (Czech Republic) |
| UEFA | Sandra Braz (Portugal) |
| UEFA | Stéphanie Frappart (France) |
| UEFA | Riem Hussein (Germany) |
| UEFA | Katalin Kulcsár (Hungary) |
| UEFA | Kateryna Monzul (Ukraine) |
| UEFA | Anastasia Pustovoitova (Russia) |
| UEFA | Esther Staubli (Switzerland) |
| UEFA | Bibiana Steinhaus (Germany) |

Fourth officials
| Confederation | Referee |
|---|---|
| CAF | Gladys Lengwe (Zambia) |
| CONCACAF | Katja Koroleva (United States) |

Assistant referees
| Confederation | Assistant referee |
|---|---|
| AFC | Makoto Bozono (Japan) |
| AFC | Fang Yan (China) |
| AFC | Maiko Hagio (Japan) |
| AFC | Hong Kum-nyo (North Korea) |
| AFC | Kim Kyoung-min (South Korea) |
| AFC | Lee Seul-gi (South Korea) |
| AFC | Naomi Teshirogi (Japan) |
| CAF | Bernadettar Kwimbira (Malawi) |
| CAF | Mary Njoroge (Kenya) |
| CAF | Lidwine Rakotozafinoro (Madagascar) |
| CAF | Queency Victoire (Mauritius) |
| CONCACAF | Chantal Boudreau (Canada) |
| CONCACAF | Princess Brown (Jamaica) |
| CONCACAF | Enedina Caudillo (Mexico) |
| CONCACAF | Mayte Chávez (Mexico) |
| CONCACAF | Felisha Mariscal (United States) |
| CONCACAF | Kathryn Nesbitt (United States) |
| CONCACAF | Shirley Perelló (Honduras) |
| CONCACAF | Stephanie-Dale Yee Sing (Jamaica) |
| CONMEBOL | Mónica Amboya (Ecuador) |
| CONMEBOL | Neuza Back (Brazil) |
| CONMEBOL | Mary Blanco (Colombia) |
| CONMEBOL | Mariana de Almeida (Argentina) |
| CONMEBOL | Luciana Mascaraña (Uruguay) |
| CONMEBOL | Tatiane Sacilotti (Brazil) |
| CONMEBOL | Loreto Toloza (Chile) |
| CONMEBOL | Leslie Vásquez (Chile) |
| OFC | Sarah Jones (New Zealand) |
| OFC | Maria Salamasina (Samoa) |
| UEFA | Oleksandra Ardasheva (Ukraine) |
| UEFA | Kylie Cockburn (Scotland) |
| UEFA | Petruța Iugulescu (Romania) |
| UEFA | Chrysoula Kourompylia (Greece) |
| UEFA | Susanne Küng (Switzerland) |
| UEFA | Ekaterina Kurochkina (Russia) |
| UEFA | Julia Magnusson (Sweden) |
| UEFA | Sian Massey-Ellis (England) |
| UEFA | Manuela Nicolosi (France) |
| UEFA | Michelle O'Neill (Republic of Ireland) |
| UEFA | Katrin Rafalski (Germany) |
| UEFA | Lisa Rashid (England) |
| UEFA | Lucie Ratajová (Czech Republic) |
| UEFA | Sanja Rođak-Karšić (Croatia) |
| UEFA | Maryna Striletska (Ukraine) |
| UEFA | Mária Súkeníková (Slovakia) |
| UEFA | Mihaela Țepușă (Romania) |
| UEFA | Katalin Török (Hungary) |

Video assistant referees
| Confederation | Male VAR officials |
|---|---|
| AFC | Chris Beath (Australia) |
| AFC | Mohammed Abdulla Hassan Mohamed (United Arab Emirates) |
| CONCACAF | Drew Fischer (Canada) |
| CONMEBOL | Mauro Vigliano (Argentina) |
| UEFA | Bastian Dankert (Germany) |
| UEFA | Carlos del Cerro Grande (Spain) |
| UEFA | Paweł Gil (Poland) |
| UEFA | Massimiliano Irrati (Italy) |
| UEFA | Danny Makkelie (Netherlands) |
| UEFA | Tiago Martins (Portugal) |
| UEFA | José María Sánchez Martínez (Spain) |
| UEFA | Sascha Stegemann (Germany) |
| UEFA | Clément Turpin (France) |
| UEFA | Paolo Valeri (Italy) |
| UEFA | Felix Zwayer (Germany) |

== Draw ==
The draw for the final tournament was held on 8 December 2018, 18:00 CET (UTC+1), at the La Seine Musicale on the island of Île Seguin, Boulogne-Billancourt. The 24 teams were drawn into six groups of four teams.

The 24 teams were allocated to four pots based on the FIFA Women's World Rankings released on 7 December 2018, with hosts France automatically placed in Pot 1 and position A1 in the draw. Teams from Pot 1 were drawn first and assigned to Position 1. This was followed by Pot 2, Pot 3, and finally Pot 4, with each of these teams also drawn to one of the positions 2–4 within their group. No group could contain more than one team from each confederation apart from UEFA, which have nine teams, where three groups had to contain two UEFA teams.

| Pot 1 | Pot 2 | Pot 3 | Pot 4 |
|---|---|---|---|
| France (3) (hosts); United States (1; title holders); Germany (2); England (4); Canada (5); Australia (6) | Netherlands (7); Japan (8); Sweden (9); Brazil (10); Spain (12); Norway (13) | South Korea (14); China (15); Italy (16); New Zealand (19); Scotland (20); Thailand (29) | Argentina (36); Chile (38); Nigeria (39); Cameroon (46); South Africa (48); Jamaica (53) |

== Squads ==
Each team had to provide to FIFA a preliminary squad of between 23 and 50 players by 26 April 2019, which was not to be published. From the preliminary squad, each team had to name a final squad of 23 players (three of whom had to be goalkeepers) by 24 May 2019. Players in the final squad could be replaced by a player from the preliminary squad due to serious injury or illness up to 24 hours prior to kickoff of the team's first match.

== Group stage ==
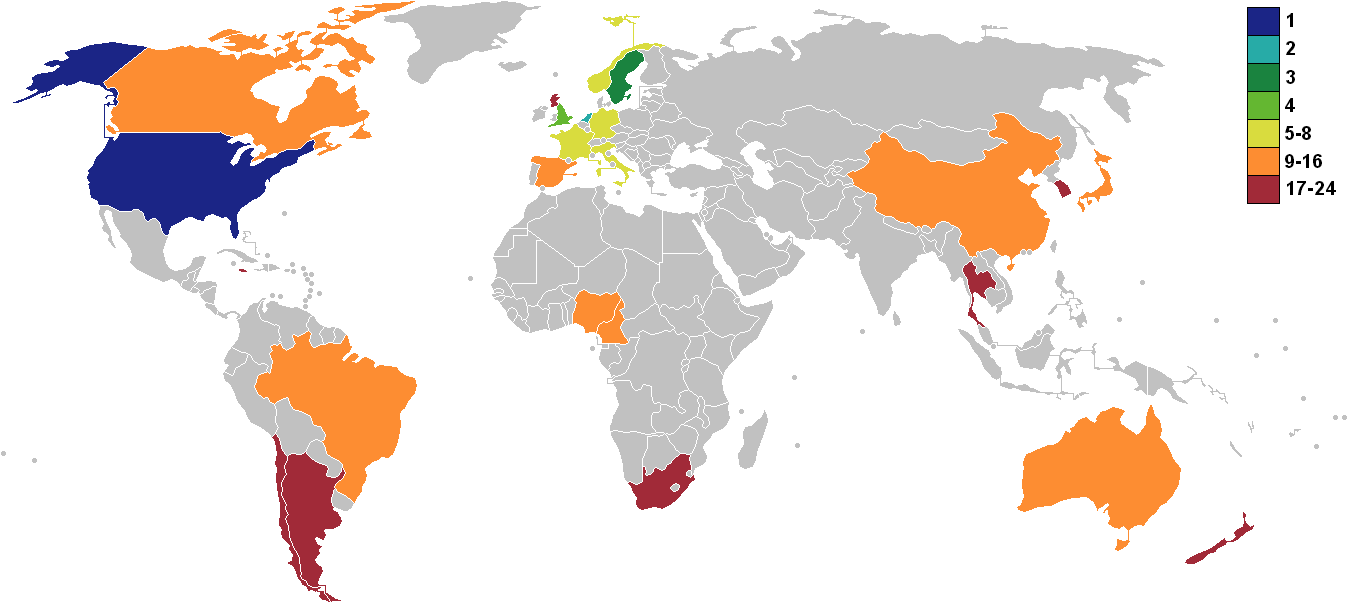
Champions Runners-up / Third place Fourth place / Quarter-finals Round of 16 / Group stage

The match schedule for the tournament was released on 8 February 2018. Following the final draw, seven group stage kick-off times were adjusted by FIFA.

The top two teams of each group and the four best third-placed teams advanced to the round of 16.

All times are local, CEST (UTC+2).

Tie-breaking criteria for group play
The ranking of teams in the group stage was determined as follows:
1. Points obtained in all group matches (three points for a win, one for a draw, none for a defeat);
2. Goal difference in all group matches;
3. Number of goals scored in all group matches;
4. Points obtained in the matches played between the teams in question;
5. Goal difference in the matches played between the teams in question;
6. Number of goals scored in the matches played between the teams in question;
7. Fair play points in all group matches (only one deduction could be applied to a player in a single match):
  - Yellow card: −1 point;
  - Indirect red card (second yellow card): −3 points;
  - Direct red card: −4 points;
  - Yellow card and direct red card: −5 points;
8. Drawing of lots.

=== Group A ===
| Pos | Team | Pld | W | D | L | GF | GA | GD | Pts | Qualification |
|---|---|---|---|---|---|---|---|---|---|---|
| 1 | France (H) | 3 | 3 | 0 | 0 | 7 | 1 | +6 | 9 | Advance to knockout stage |
| 2 | Norway | 3 | 2 | 0 | 1 | 6 | 3 | +3 | 6 | Advance to knockout stage |
| 3 | Nigeria | 3 | 1 | 0 | 2 | 2 | 4 | −2 | 3 | Advance to knockout stage |
| 4 | South Korea | 3 | 0 | 0 | 3 | 1 | 8 | −7 | 0 | |

Source: FIFA
(H) Hosts
7 June 2019
21:00

| France | 4–0 | South Korea |
|---|---|---|
| Le Sommer 9'; Renard 35', 45+2'; Henry 85' | Report |

Parc des Princes, Paris
Attendance: 45,261
Referee: Claudia Umpiérrez (Uruguay)
8 June 2019
21:00

| Norway | 3–0 | Nigeria |
|---|---|---|
| Reiten 17'; Utland 34'; Ohale 37' (o.g.) | Report |

Stade Auguste-Delaune, Reims
Attendance: 11,058
Referee: Kate Jacewicz (Australia)

12 June 2019
15:00

| Nigeria | 2–0 | South Korea |
|---|---|---|
| Kim Do-yeon 29' (o.g.); Oshoala 75' | Report |

Stade des Alpes, Grenoble
Attendance: 11,252
Referee: Anastasia Pustovoitova (Russia)
12 June 2019
21:00

| France | 2–1 | Norway |
|---|---|---|
| Gauvin 46'; Le Sommer 72' (pen.) | Report | Renard 54' (o.g.) |

Allianz Riviera, Nice
Attendance: 34,872
Referee: Bibiana Steinhaus (Germany)

17 June 2019
21:00

| Nigeria | 0–1 | France |
|---|---|---|
| | Report | Renard 79' (pen.) |

Roazhon Park, Rennes
Attendance: 28,267
Referee: Melissa Borjas (Honduras)
17 June 2019
21:00

| South Korea | 1–2 | Norway |
|---|---|---|
| Yeo Min-ji 78' | Report | Graham Hansen 5' (pen.); Herlovsen 51' (pen.) |

Stade Auguste-Delaune, Reims
Attendance: 13,034
Referee: Marie-Soleil Beaudoin (Canada)

=== Group B ===
| Pos | Team | Pld | W | D | L | GF | GA | GD | Pts | Qualification |
|---|---|---|---|---|---|---|---|---|---|---|
| 1 | Germany | 3 | 3 | 0 | 0 | 6 | 0 | +6 | 9 | Advance to knockout stage |
| 2 | Spain | 3 | 1 | 1 | 1 | 3 | 2 | +1 | 4 | Advance to knockout stage |
| 3 | China | 3 | 1 | 1 | 1 | 1 | 1 | 0 | 4 | Advance to knockout stage |
| 4 | South Africa | 3 | 0 | 0 | 3 | 1 | 8 | −7 | 0 | |

Source: FIFA
8 June 2019
15:00

| Germany | 1–0 | China |
|---|---|---|
| Gwinn 66' | Report |

Roazhon Park, Rennes
Attendance: 15,283
Referee: Marie-Soleil Beaudoin (Canada)
8 June 2019
18:00

| Spain | 3–1 | South Africa |
|---|---|---|
| Hermoso 69' (pen.), 82' (pen.); L. García 89' | Report | Kgatlana 25' |

Stade Océane, Le Havre
Attendance: 12,044
Referee: María Carvajal (Chile)

12 June 2019
18:00

| Germany | 1–0 | Spain |
|---|---|---|
| Däbritz 42' | Report |

Stade du Hainaut, Valenciennes
Attendance: 20,761
Referee: Kateryna Monzul (Ukraine)
13 June 2019
21:00

| South Africa | 0–1 | China |
|---|---|---|
| | Report | Li Ying 40' |

Parc des Princes, Paris
Attendance: 20,011
Referee: Katalin Kulcsár (Hungary)

17 June 2019
18:00

| South Africa | 0–4 | Germany |
|---|---|---|
| | Report | Leupolz 14'; Däbritz 29'; Popp 40'; Magull 58' |

Stade de la Mosson, Montpellier
Attendance: 15,502
Referee: Sandra Braz (Portugal)
17 June 2019
18:00

| China | 0–0 | Spain |
|---|---|---|
| | Report |

Stade Océane, Le Havre
Attendance: 11,814
Referee: Edina Alves Batista (Brazil)

=== Group C ===
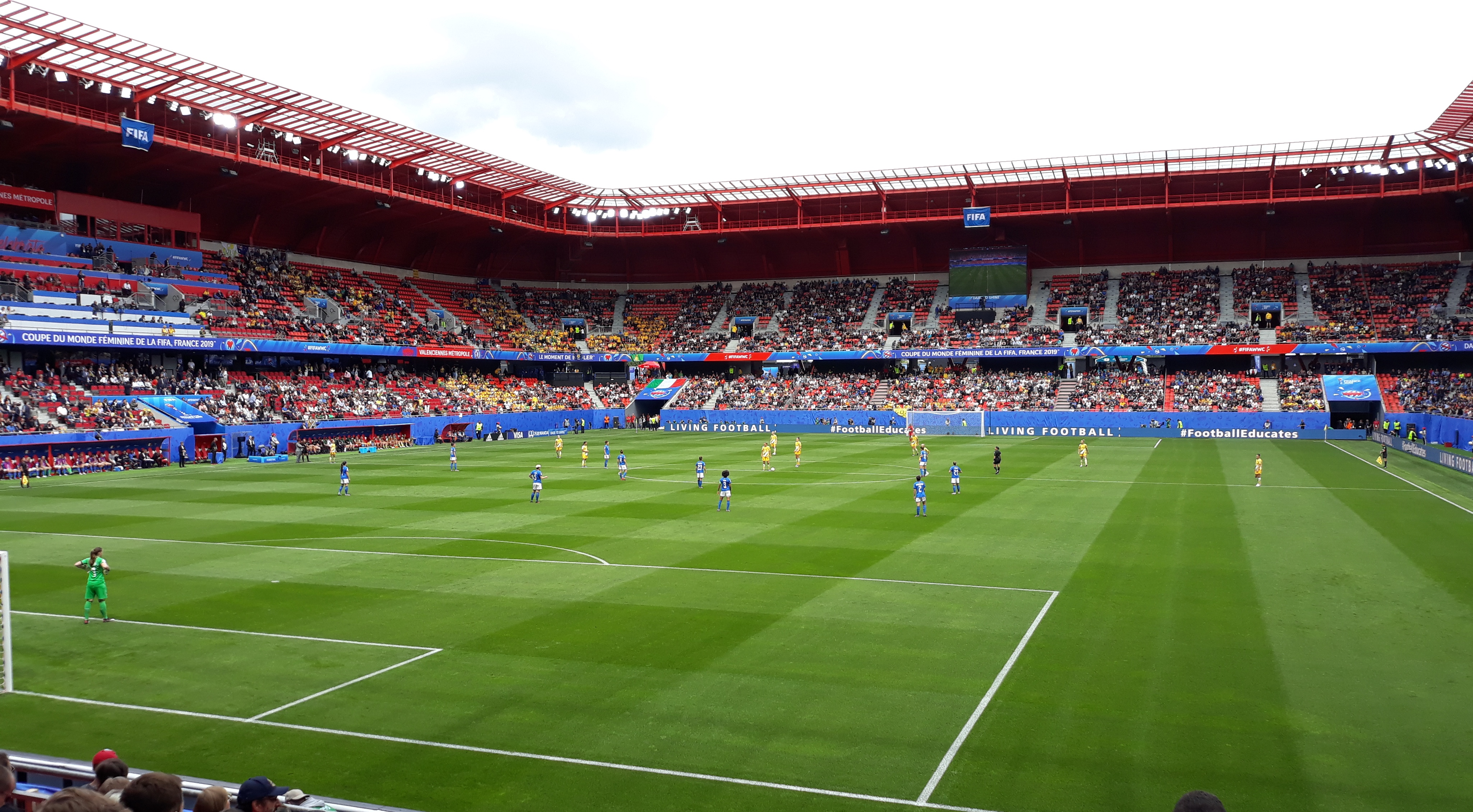
Australia vs Italy in Valenciennes

| Pos | Team | Pld | W | D | L | GF | GA | GD | Pts | Qualification |
|---|---|---|---|---|---|---|---|---|---|---|
| 1 | Italy | 3 | 2 | 0 | 1 | 7 | 2 | +5 | 6 | Advance to knockout stage |
| 2 | Australia | 3 | 2 | 0 | 1 | 8 | 5 | +3 | 6 | Advance to knockout stage |
| 3 | Brazil | 3 | 2 | 0 | 1 | 6 | 3 | +3 | 6 | Advance to knockout stage |
| 4 | Jamaica | 3 | 0 | 0 | 3 | 1 | 12 | −11 | 0 | |

Source: FIFA
9 June 2019
13:00

| Australia | 1–2 | Italy |
|---|---|---|
| Kerr 22' | Report | Bonansea 56', 90+5' |

Stade du Hainaut, Valenciennes
Attendance: 15,380
Referee: Melissa Borjas (Honduras)
9 June 2019
15:30

| Brazil | 3–0 | Jamaica |
|---|---|---|
| Cristiane 15', 50', 64' | Report |

Stade des Alpes, Grenoble
Attendance: 17,668
Referee: Riem Hussein (Germany)

13 June 2019
18:00

| Australia | 3–2 | Brazil |
|---|---|---|
| Foord 45+1'; Logarzo 58'; Mônica 66' (o.g.) | Report | Marta 27' (pen.); Cristiane 38' |

Stade de la Mosson, Montpellier
Attendance: 17,032
Referee: Esther Staubli (Switzerland)
14 June 2019
18:00

| Jamaica | 0–5 | Italy |
|---|---|---|
| | Report | Girelli 12' (pen.), 25', 46'; Galli 71', 81' |

Stade Auguste-Delaune, Reims
Attendance: 12,016
Referee: Anna-Marie Keighley (New Zealand)

18 June 2019
21:00

| Jamaica | 1–4 | Australia |
|---|---|---|
| Solaun 49' | Report | Kerr 11', 42', 69', 83' |

Stade des Alpes, Grenoble
Attendance: 17,402
Referee: Katalin Kulcsár (Hungary)
18 June 2019
21:00

| Italy | 0–1 | Brazil |
|---|---|---|
| | Report | Marta 74' (pen.) |

Stade du Hainaut, Valenciennes
Attendance: 21,669
Referee: Lucila Venegas (Mexico)

=== Group D ===
| Pos | Team | Pld | W | D | L | GF | GA | GD | Pts | Qualification |
|---|---|---|---|---|---|---|---|---|---|---|
| 1 | England | 3 | 3 | 0 | 0 | 5 | 1 | +4 | 9 | Advance to knockout stage |
| 2 | Japan | 3 | 1 | 1 | 1 | 2 | 3 | −1 | 4 | Advance to knockout stage |
| 3 | Argentina | 3 | 0 | 2 | 1 | 3 | 4 | −1 | 2 | |
| 4 | Scotland | 3 | 0 | 1 | 2 | 5 | 7 | −2 | 1 | |

Source: FIFA
9 June 2019
18:00

| England | 2–1 | Scotland |
|---|---|---|
| Parris 14' (pen.); White 40' | Report | Emslie 79' |

Allianz Riviera, Nice
Attendance: 13,188
Referee: Jana Adámková (Czech Republic)
10 June 2019
18:00

| Argentina | 0–0 | Japan |
|---|---|---|
| | Report |

Parc des Princes, Paris
Attendance: 25,055
Referee: Stéphanie Frappart (France)

14 June 2019
15:00

| Japan | 2–1 | Scotland |
|---|---|---|
| Iwabuchi 23'; Sugasawa 37' (pen.) | Report | Clelland 88' |

Roazhon Park, Rennes
Attendance: 13,201
Referee: Lidya Tafesse (Ethiopia)
14 June 2019
21:00

| England | 1–0 | Argentina |
|---|---|---|
| Taylor 62' | Report |

Stade Océane, Le Havre
Attendance: 20,294
Referee: Qin Liang (China)

19 June 2019
21:00

| Japan | 0–2 | England |
|---|---|---|
| | Report | White 14', 84' |

Allianz Riviera, Nice
Attendance: 14,319
Referee: Claudia Umpiérrez (Uruguay)
19 June 2019
21:00

| Scotland | 3–3 | Argentina |
|---|---|---|
| Little 19'; Beattie 49'; Cuthbert 69' | Report | Menéndez 74'; Alexander 79' (o.g.); Bonsegundo 90+4' (pen.) |

Parc des Princes, Paris
Attendance: 28,205
Referee: Ri Hyang-ok (North Korea)

=== Group E ===
| Pos | Team | Pld | W | D | L | GF | GA | GD | Pts | Qualification |
|---|---|---|---|---|---|---|---|---|---|---|
| 1 | Netherlands | 3 | 3 | 0 | 0 | 6 | 2 | +4 | 9 | Advance to knockout stage |
| 2 | Canada | 3 | 2 | 0 | 1 | 4 | 2 | +2 | 6 | Advance to knockout stage |
| 3 | Cameroon | 3 | 1 | 0 | 2 | 3 | 5 | −2 | 3 | Advance to knockout stage |
| 4 | New Zealand | 3 | 0 | 0 | 3 | 1 | 5 | −4 | 0 | |

Source: FIFA
10 June 2019
21:00

| Canada | 1–0 | Cameroon |
|---|---|---|
| Buchanan 45' | Report |

Stade de la Mosson, Montpellier
Attendance: 10,710
Referee: Ri Hyang-ok (North Korea)
11 June 2019
15:00

| New Zealand | 0–1 | Netherlands |
|---|---|---|
| | Report | Roord 90+2' |

Stade Océane, Le Havre
Attendance: 10,654
Referee: Edina Alves Batista (Brazil)

15 June 2019
15:00

| Netherlands | 3–1 | Cameroon |
|---|---|---|
| Miedema 41', 85'; Bloodworth 48' | Report | Onguéné 43' |

Stade du Hainaut, Valenciennes
Attendance: 22,423
Referee: Casey Reibelt (Australia)
15 June 2019
21:00

| Canada | 2–0 | New Zealand |
|---|---|---|
| Fleming 48'; Prince 79' | Report |

Stade des Alpes, Grenoble
Attendance: 14,856
Referee: Yoshimi Yamashita (Japan)

20 June 2019
18:00

| Netherlands | 2–1 | Canada |
|---|---|---|
| Dekker 54'; Beerensteyn 75' | Report | Sinclair 60' |

Stade Auguste-Delaune, Reims
Attendance: 19,277
Referee: Stéphanie Frappart (France)
20 June 2019
18:00

| Cameroon | 2–1 | New Zealand |
|---|---|---|
| Nchout 57', 90+5' | Report | Awona 80' (o.g.) |

Stade de la Mosson, Montpellier
Attendance: 8,009
Referee: Kateryna Monzul (Ukraine)

=== Group F ===
| Pos | Team | Pld | W | D | L | GF | GA | GD | Pts | Qualification |
|---|---|---|---|---|---|---|---|---|---|---|
| 1 | United States | 3 | 3 | 0 | 0 | 18 | 0 | +18 | 9 | Advance to knockout stage |
| 2 | Sweden | 3 | 2 | 0 | 1 | 7 | 3 | +4 | 6 | Advance to knockout stage |
| 3 | Chile | 3 | 1 | 0 | 2 | 2 | 5 | −3 | 3 | |
| 4 | Thailand | 3 | 0 | 0 | 3 | 1 | 20 | −19 | 0 | |

Source: FIFA
11 June 2019
18:00

| Chile | 0–2 | Sweden |
|---|---|---|
| | Report | Asllani 83'; Janogy 90+4' |

Roazhon Park, Rennes
Attendance: 15,875
Referee: Lucila Venegas (Mexico)
11 June 2019
21:00

| United States | 13–0 | Thailand |
|---|---|---|
| Morgan 12', 53', 74', 81', 87'; Lavelle 20', 56'; Horan 32'; Mewis 50', 54'; Rapinoe 79'; Pugh 85'; Lloyd 90+2' | Report |

Stade Auguste-Delaune, Reims
Attendance: 18,591
Referee: Laura Fortunato (Argentina)

16 June 2019
15:00

| Sweden | 5–1 | Thailand |
|---|---|---|
| Sembrant 6'; Asllani 19'; Rolfö 42'; Hurtig 81'; Rubensson 90+6' (pen.) | Report | Kanjana 90+1' |

Allianz Riviera, Nice
Attendance: 9,354
Referee: Salima Mukansanga (Rwanda)
16 June 2019
18:00

| United States | 3–0 | Chile |
|---|---|---|
| Lloyd 11', 35'; Ertz 26' | Report |

Parc des Princes, Paris
Attendance: 45,594
Referee: Riem Hussein (Germany)

20 June 2019
21:00

| Sweden | 0–2 | United States |
|---|---|---|
| | Report | Horan 3'; Andersson 50' (o.g.) |

Stade Océane, Le Havre
Attendance: 22,418
Referee: Anastasia Pustovoitova (Russia)
20 June 2019
21:00

| Thailand | 0–2 | Chile |
|---|---|---|
| | Report | Waraporn 48' (o.g.); Urrutia 80' |

Roazhon Park, Rennes
Attendance: 13,567
Referee: Anna-Marie Keighley (New Zealand)

=== Ranking of third-placed teams ===
The four best third-placed teams from the six groups advanced to the knockout stage along with the six group winners and six runners-up.

| Pos | Grp | Team | Pld | W | D | L | GF | GA | GD | Pts | Qualification |
|---|---|---|---|---|---|---|---|---|---|---|---|
| 1 | C | Brazil | 3 | 2 | 0 | 1 | 6 | 3 | +3 | 6 | Advance to knockout stage |
| 2 | B | China | 3 | 1 | 1 | 1 | 1 | 1 | 0 | 4 | Advance to knockout stage |
| 3 | E | Cameroon | 3 | 1 | 0 | 2 | 3 | 5 | −2 | 3 | Advance to knockout stage |
| 4 | A | Nigeria | 3 | 1 | 0 | 2 | 2 | 4 | −2 | 3 | Advance to knockout stage |
| 5 | F | Chile | 3 | 1 | 0 | 2 | 2 | 5 | −3 | 3 | |
| 6 | D | Argentina | 3 | 0 | 2 | 1 | 3 | 4 | −1 | 2 | |

Source: FIFA
Rules for classification: 1) Points; 2) Goal difference; 3) Goals scored; 4) Fair play points; 5) Drawing of lots.

== Knockout stage ==
In the knockout stage, if a match was level at the end of 90 minutes of normal playing time, extra time was played (two periods of 15 minutes each), where each team was allowed to make a fourth substitution. If the score was still level after extra time, the winners were determined by a penalty shoot-out.

=== Bracket ===
Round of 16
22 June – Nice
Norway (p) | 1 (4)
Australia | 1 (1)
23 June – Valenciennes
England | 3
Cameroon | 0
23 June – Le Havre
France (a.e.t.) | 2
Brazil | 1
24 June – Reims
Spain | 1
United States | 2
25 June – Montpellier
Italy | 2
China | 0
25 June – Rennes
Netherlands | 2
Japan | 1
22 June – Grenoble
Germany | 3
Nigeria | 0
24 June – Paris
Sweden | 1
Canada | 0

Quarter-finals
27 June – Le Havre
Norway | 0
England | 3
28 June – Paris
France | 1
United States | 2
29 June – Valenciennes
Italy | 0
Netherlands | 2
29 June – Rennes
Germany | 1
Sweden | 2

Semi-finals
2 July – Décines-Charpieu
England | 1
United States | 2
3 July – Décines-Charpieu
Netherlands (a.e.t.) | 1
Sweden | 0

Final
7 July – Décines-Charpieu
United States | 2
Netherlands | 0
Third place play-off
6 July – Nice
England | 1
Sweden | 2

=== Round of 16 ===
22 June 2019
17:30

| Germany | 3–0 | Nigeria |
|---|---|---|
| Popp 20'; Däbritz 27' (pen.); Schüller 82' | Report |

Stade des Alpes, Grenoble
Attendance: 17,988
Referee: Yoshimi Yamashita (Japan)

22 June 2019
21:00

| Norway | 1–1 (a.e.t.) | Australia |
|---|---|---|
| Herlovsen 31' | Report | Kellond-Knight 83' |
Penalties
| Graham Hansen (penalty scored); Reiten (penalty scored); Mjelde (penalty scored); Syrstad Engen (penalty scored) | 4–1 | (penalty missed) Kerr; (penalty missed) Gielnik; (penalty scored) Catley |

Allianz Riviera, Nice
Attendance: 12,229
Referee: Riem Hussein (Germany)

23 June 2019
17:30

| England | 3–0 | Cameroon |
|---|---|---|
| Houghton 14'; White 45+4'; Greenwood 58' | Report |

Stade du Hainaut, Valenciennes
Attendance: 20,148
Referee: Qin Liang (China)

23 June 2019
21:00

| France | 2–1 (a.e.t.) | Brazil |
|---|---|---|
| Gauvin 52'; Henry 107' | Report | Thaisa 63' |

Stade Océane, Le Havre
Attendance: 23,965
Referee: Marie-Soleil Beaudoin (Canada)

24 June 2019
18:00

| Spain | 1–2 | United States |
|---|---|---|
| Hermoso 9' | Report | Rapinoe 7' (pen.), 75' (pen.) |

Stade Auguste-Delaune, Reims
Attendance: 19,633
Referee: Katalin Kulcsár (Hungary)

24 June 2019
21:00

| Sweden | 1–0 | Canada |
|---|---|---|
| Blackstenius 55' | Report |

Parc des Princes, Paris
Attendance: 38,078
Referee: Kate Jacewicz (Australia)

25 June 2019
18:00

| Italy | 2–0 | China |
|---|---|---|
| Giacinti 15'; Galli 49' | Report |

Stade de la Mosson, Montpellier
Attendance: 17,492
Referee: Edina Alves Batista (Brazil)

25 June 2019
21:00

| Netherlands | 2–1 | Japan |
|---|---|---|
| Martens 17', 90' (pen.) | Report | Hasegawa 43' |

Roazhon Park, Rennes
Attendance: 21,076
Referee: Melissa Borjas (Honduras)

=== Quarter-finals ===
27 June 2019
21:00

| Norway | 0–3 | England |
|---|---|---|
| | Report | Scott 3'; White 40'; Bronze 57' |

Stade Océane, Le Havre
Attendance: 21,111
Referee: Lucila Venegas (Mexico)

28 June 2019
21:00

| France | 1–2 | United States |
|---|---|---|
| Renard 81' | Report | Rapinoe 5', 65' |

Parc des Princes, Paris
Attendance: 45,595
Referee: Kateryna Monzul (Ukraine)

29 June 2019
15:00

| Italy | 0–2 | Netherlands |
|---|---|---|
| | Report | Miedema 70'; Van der Gragt 80' |

Stade du Hainaut, Valenciennes
Attendance: 22,600
Referee: Claudia Umpiérrez (Uruguay)

29 June 2019
18:30

| Germany | 1–2 | Sweden |
|---|---|---|
| Magull 16' | Report | Jakobsson 22'; Blackstenius 48' |

Roazhon Park, Rennes
Attendance: 25,301
Referee: Stéphanie Frappart (France)

=== Semi-finals ===
2 July 2019
21:00

| England | 1–2 | United States |
|---|---|---|
| White 19' | Report | Press 10'; Morgan 31' |

Parc Olympique Lyonnais, Décines-Charpieu
Attendance: 53,512
Referee: Edina Alves Batista (Brazil)

3 July 2019
21:00

| Netherlands | 1–0 (a.e.t.) | Sweden |
|---|---|---|
| Groenen 99' | Report |

Parc Olympique Lyonnais, Décines-Charpieu
Attendance: 48,452
Referee: Marie-Soleil Beaudoin (Canada)

=== Third place play-off ===
6 July 2019
17:00

| England | 1–2 | Sweden |
|---|---|---|
| Kirby 31' | Report | Asllani 11'; Jakobsson 22' |

Allianz Riviera, Nice
Attendance: 20,316
Referee: Anastasia Pustovoitova (Russia)

=== Final ===
7 July 2019
17:00

| United States | 2–0 | Netherlands |
|---|---|---|
| Rapinoe 61' (pen.); Lavelle 69' | Report |

Parc Olympique Lyonnais, Décines-Charpieu
Attendance: 57,900
Referee: Stéphanie Frappart (France)

== Awards ==
The following awards were given at the conclusion of the tournament. The Golden Ball (best overall player), Golden Boot (top scorer) and Golden Glove (best goalkeeper) awards were sponsored by Adidas, while the Goal of the Tournament was sponsored by Hyundai Motor Company. FIFA.com shortlisted ten goals for users to vote on as the tournaments' best, with the poll closing on 17 July 2019.

| Golden Ball | Silver Ball | Bronze Ball |
|---|---|---|
| (United States) Megan Rapinoe | (England) Lucy Bronze | (United States) Rose Lavelle |
| Golden Boot | Silver Boot | Bronze Boot |
| (United States) Megan Rapinoe | (United States) Alex Morgan | (England) Ellen White |
| 6 goals, 3 assists 428 minutes played | 6 goals, 3 assists 490 minutes played | 6 goals, 0 assists 514 minutes played |
Golden Glove
(Netherlands) Sari van Veenendaal
FIFA Young Player Award
(Germany) Giulia Gwinn
Goal of the Tournament
(Brazil) Cristiane
38' for 2–0 in Group C vs Australia (matchday 2; 13 June)
FIFA Fair Play Award
France

=== Players who Dared to Shine ===
The FIFA Technical Study Group announced a list of ten key players of the tournament who "dared to shine".

| Goalkeeper | Defenders | Midfielders | Forwards |
|---|---|---|---|
| (Netherlands) Sari van Veenendaal | (England) Lucy Bronze (United States) Crystal Dunn | (England) Jill Scott (United States) Julie Ertz (United States) Rose Lavelle | (England) Ellen White (Netherlands) Vivianne Miedema (Sweden) Sofia Jakobsson (United States) Megan Rapinoe |

=== Prize money ===
Prize money amounts were announced in October 2018.

| Position | Amount (million USD) | |
| Position | Per team | Total |
|---|---|---|
| Champions | 4.0 | 4.0 |
| Runner-up | 2.6 | 2.6 |
| Third place | 2.0 | 2.0 |
| Fourth place | 1.6 | 1.6 |
| 5th–8th place (quarter-finals) | 1.45 | 5.8 |
| 9th–16th place (round of 16) | 1.0 | 8.0 |
| 17th–24th place (group stage) | 0.75 | 6.0 |
| Total | | 30.0 |

== Statistics ==
=== Goalscorers ===
There were 146 goals scored in 52 matches, for an average of 2.81 goals per match.

6 goals

- (England) Ellen White
- (United States) Alex Morgan
- (United States) Megan Rapinoe

5 goals

- (Australia) Sam Kerr

4 goals

- (Brazil) Cristiane
- (France) Wendie Renard

3 goals

- (Germany) Sara Däbritz
- (Italy) Aurora Galli
- (Italy) Cristiana Girelli
- (Netherlands) Vivianne Miedema
- (Spain) Jennifer Hermoso
- (Sweden) Kosovare Asllani
- (United States) Rose Lavelle
- (United States) Carli Lloyd

2 goals

- (Brazil) Marta
- (Cameroon) Ajara Nchout
- (France) Valérie Gauvin
- (France) Amandine Henry
- (France) Eugénie Le Sommer
- (Germany) Lina Magull
- (Germany) Alexandra Popp
- (Italy) Barbara Bonansea
- (Netherlands) Lieke Martens
- (Norway) Isabell Herlovsen
- (Sweden) Stina Blackstenius
- (Sweden) Sofia Jakobsson
- (United States) Lindsey Horan
- (United States) Sam Mewis

1 goal

- (Argentina) Florencia Bonsegundo
- (Argentina) Milagros Menéndez
- (Australia) Caitlin Foord
- (Australia) Elise Kellond-Knight
- (Australia) Chloe Logarzo
- (Brazil) Thaisa
- (Cameroon) Gabrielle Onguéné
- (Canada) Kadeisha Buchanan
- (Canada) Jessie Fleming
- (Canada) Nichelle Prince
- (Canada) Christine Sinclair
- (Chile) María José Urrutia
- (China) Li Ying
- (England) Lucy Bronze
- (England) Alex Greenwood
- (England) Steph Houghton
- (England) Fran Kirby
- (England) Nikita Parris
- (England) Jill Scott
- (England) Jodie Taylor
- (Germany) Giulia Gwinn
- (Germany) Melanie Leupolz
- (Germany) Lea Schüller
- (Italy) Valentina Giacinti
- (Jamaica) Havana Solaun
- (Japan) Yui Hasegawa
- (Japan) Mana Iwabuchi
- (Japan) Yuika Sugasawa
- (Netherlands) Lineth Beerensteyn
- (Netherlands) Dominique Bloodworth
- (Netherlands) Anouk Dekker
- (Netherlands) Stefanie van der Gragt
- (Netherlands) Jackie Groenen
- (Netherlands) Jill Roord
- (Nigeria) Asisat Oshoala
- (Norway) Caroline Graham Hansen
- (Norway) Guro Reiten
- (Norway) Lisa-Marie Karlseng Utland
- (Scotland) Jen Beattie
- (Scotland) Lana Clelland
- (Scotland) Erin Cuthbert
- (Scotland) Claire Emslie
- (Scotland) Kim Little
- (South Africa) Thembi Kgatlana
- (South Korea) Yeo Min-ji
- (Spain) Lucía García
- (Sweden) Lina Hurtig
- (Sweden) Madelen Janogy
- (Sweden) Fridolina Rolfö
- (Sweden) Elin Rubensson
- (Sweden) Linda Sembrant
- (Thailand) Kanjana Sungngoen
- (United States) Julie Ertz
- (United States) Christen Press
- (United States) Mallory Pugh

1 own goal

- (Brazil) Mônica (against Australia)
- (Cameroon) Aurelle Awona (against New Zealand)
- (France) Wendie Renard (against Norway)
- (Nigeria) Osinachi Ohale (against Norway)
- (Scotland) Lee Alexander (against Argentina)
- (South Korea) Kim Do-yeon (against Nigeria)
- (Sweden) Jonna Andersson (against United States)
- (Thailand) Waraporn Boonsing (against Chile)

Source: FIFA

=== Assists ===
4 assists

- (Netherlands) Sherida Spitse

3 assists

- (England) Beth Mead
- (France) Amel Majri
- (Italy) Manuela Giugliano
- (United States) Sam Mewis
- (United States) Alex Morgan
- (United States) Megan Rapinoe

2 assists

- (Brazil) Andressa Alves
- (England) Lucy Bronze
- (England) Toni Duggan
- (France) Gaëtane Thiney
- (United States) Tierna Davidson
- (United States) Lindsey Horan
- (United States) Kelley O'Hara

1 assist

- (Argentina) Dalila Ippólito
- (Australia) Ellie Carpenter
- (Australia) Emily Gielnik
- (Australia) Katrina Gorry
- (Australia) Chloe Logarzo
- (Brazil) Debinha
- (Cameroon) Raissa Feudjio
- (Cameroon) Yvonne Leuko
- (Canada) Janine Beckie
- (Canada) Ashley Lawrence
- (Canada) Nichelle Prince
- (Chile) Yessenia López
- (China) Zhang Rui
- (England) Karen Carney
- (England) Fran Kirby
- (England) Nikita Parris
- (England) Jill Scott
- (England) Georgia Stanway
- (France) Kadidiatou Diani
- (France) Amandine Henry
- (France) Eugénie Le Sommer
- (Germany) Sara Däbritz
- (Germany) Giulia Gwinn
- (Germany) Lina Magull
- (Germany) Verena Schweers
- (Italy) Lisa Boattin
- (Italy) Valentina Cernoia
- (Italy) Alia Guagni
- (Jamaica) Khadija Shaw
- (Japan) Jun Endo
- (Japan) Mana Iwabuchi
- (Netherlands) Lineth Beerensteyn
- (Netherlands) Desiree van Lunteren
- (Netherlands) Shanice van de Sanden
- (Nigeria) Chidinma Okeke
- (Norway) Caroline Graham Hansen
- (Norway) Guro Reiten
- (Norway) Karina Sævik
- (Scotland) Erin Cuthbert
- (Scotland) Lisa Evans
- (Scotland) Caroline Weir
- (South Africa) Linda Motlhalo
- (South Korea) Lee Geum-min
- (Spain) Lucía García
- (Spain) Virginia Torrecilla
- (Sweden) Anna Anvegård
- (Sweden) Kosovare Asllani
- (Sweden) Stina Blackstenius
- (Sweden) Magdalena Eriksson
- (Sweden) Elin Rubensson
- (Sweden) Linda Sembrant
- (Thailand) Taneekarn Dangda
- (United States) Crystal Dunn
- (United States) Tobin Heath
- (United States) Christen Press
- (United States) Mallory Pugh

Source: FIFA Technical Report

=== Discipline ===
A player was automatically suspended for the next match for the following offences:

- Receiving a red card (red card suspensions could be extended for serious offences)
- Receiving two yellow cards in two matches; yellow cards expired after the completion of the quarter-finals (yellow card suspensions were not carried forward to any other future international matches)

The following suspensions were served during the tournament:

| Player | Offence(s) | Suspension |
|---|---|---|
| (Netherlands) Anouk Dekker | (red card) in qualifying vs Switzerland (13 November 2018) | Group E vs New Zealand (matchday 1; 11 June) |
| (South Africa) Nothando Vilakazi | (yellow card) (yellow-red card) in Group B vs Spain (matchday 1; 8 June) | Group B vs China (matchday 2; 13 June) |
| (Brazil) Formiga | (yellow card) in Group C vs Jamaica (matchday 1; 9 June); (yellow card) in Group C vs Australia (matchday 2; 13 June) | Group C vs Italy (matchday 3; 18 June) |
| (Thailand) Taneekarn Dangda | (yellow card) in Group F vs United States (matchday 1; 11 June); (yellow card) in Group F vs Sweden (matchday 2; 16 June) | Group F vs Chile (matchday 3; 20 June) |
| (Nigeria) Ngozi Ebere | (yellow card) (yellow-red card) in Group A vs France (matchday 3; 17 June) | Round of 16 vs Germany (22 June) |
| (Nigeria) Rita Chikwelu | (yellow card) in Group A vs South Korea (matchday 2; 12 June); (yellow card) in Group A vs France (matchday 3; 17 June) | Round of 16 vs Germany (22 June) |
| (Sweden) Fridolina Rolfö | (yellow card) in Round of 16 vs Canada (24 June); (yellow card) in Quarter-finals vs Germany (29 June) | Semi-finals vs Netherlands (3 July) |
| (England) Millie Bright | (yellow card) (yellow-red card) in Semi-finals vs United States (2 July) | Third place play-off vs Sweden (6 July) |

=== Tournament ranking ===
Per statistical convention in soccer, matches decided in extra time are counted as wins and losses, while matches decided by penalty shoot-outs are counted as draws.

| Pos | Grp | Team | Pld | W | D | L | GF | GA | GD | Pts | Final result |
|---|---|---|---|---|---|---|---|---|---|---|---|
| 1 | F | United States | 7 | 7 | 0 | 0 | 26 | 3 | +23 | 21 | Champions |
| 2 | E | Netherlands | 7 | 6 | 0 | 1 | 11 | 5 | +6 | 18 | Runners-up |
| 3 | F | Sweden | 7 | 5 | 0 | 2 | 12 | 6 | +6 | 15 | Third place |
| 4 | D | England | 7 | 5 | 0 | 2 | 13 | 5 | +8 | 15 | Fourth place |
| 5 | B | Germany | 5 | 4 | 0 | 1 | 10 | 2 | +8 | 12 | Eliminated in quarter-finals |
| 6 | A | France (H) | 5 | 4 | 0 | 1 | 10 | 4 | +6 | 12 | Eliminated in quarter-finals |
| 7 | C | Italy | 5 | 3 | 0 | 2 | 9 | 4 | +5 | 9 | Eliminated in quarter-finals |
| 8 | A | Norway | 5 | 2 | 1 | 2 | 7 | 7 | 0 | 7 | Eliminated in quarter-finals |
| 9 | C | Australia | 4 | 2 | 1 | 1 | 9 | 6 | +3 | 7 | Eliminated in round of 16 |
| 10 | C | Brazil | 4 | 2 | 0 | 2 | 7 | 5 | +2 | 6 | Eliminated in round of 16 |
| 11 | E | Canada | 4 | 2 | 0 | 2 | 4 | 3 | +1 | 6 | Eliminated in round of 16 |
| 12 | B | Spain | 4 | 1 | 1 | 2 | 4 | 4 | 0 | 4 | Eliminated in round of 16 |
| 13 | D | Japan | 4 | 1 | 1 | 2 | 3 | 5 | −2 | 4 | Eliminated in round of 16 |
| 14 | B | China | 4 | 1 | 1 | 2 | 1 | 3 | −2 | 4 | Eliminated in round of 16 |
| 15 | E | Cameroon | 4 | 1 | 0 | 3 | 3 | 8 | −5 | 3 | Eliminated in round of 16 |
| 16 | A | Nigeria | 4 | 1 | 0 | 3 | 2 | 7 | −5 | 3 | Eliminated in round of 16 |
| 17 | F | Chile | 3 | 1 | 0 | 2 | 2 | 5 | −3 | 3 | Eliminated in group stage |
| 18 | D | Argentina | 3 | 0 | 2 | 1 | 3 | 4 | −1 | 2 | Eliminated in group stage |
| 19 | D | Scotland | 3 | 0 | 1 | 2 | 5 | 7 | −2 | 1 | Eliminated in group stage |
| 20 | E | New Zealand | 3 | 0 | 0 | 3 | 1 | 5 | −4 | 0 | Eliminated in group stage |
| 21 | A | South Korea | 3 | 0 | 0 | 3 | 1 | 8 | −7 | 0 | Eliminated in group stage |
| 22 | B | South Africa | 3 | 0 | 0 | 3 | 1 | 8 | −7 | 0 | Eliminated in group stage |
| 23 | C | Jamaica | 3 | 0 | 0 | 3 | 1 | 12 | −11 | 0 | Eliminated in group stage |
| 24 | F | Thailand | 3 | 0 | 0 | 3 | 1 | 20 | −19 | 0 | Eliminated in group stage |

Source: FIFA Technical Report
(H) Hosts

== Branding ==
The emblem and slogan were launched on 19 September 2017 at the Musée de l'Homme in Paris. The emblem mimics the shape of the World Cup trophy and features a stylised football surrounded by eight decorative shards of light, symbolising the eighth edition of the Women's World Cup. It alludes to several French cultural icons:

- the colours of the flag of France
- the blue and white stripes of the marinière, known also as the "Breton stripe"
- the fleur-de-lis

The World Cup's official English-language slogan is "Dare to Shine"; its French slogan is "Le moment de briller".

== Ticketing ==
FIFA and the local organising committee sold tickets for the Women's World Cup beginning with a pre-sale of individual tickets in December 2018, single-city ticket packages in late 2018, and single-ticket sales for the general public beginning on 7 March 2019. The online platform, hosted by AP2S, permitted fans to print their tickets beginning on 20 May 2019, which included seating assignments that had separated ticketholders who had purchased their tickets as a group or family. FIFA responded to online complaints by referring to a warning in the online system that had reminded purchasers that its tickets would not be guaranteed in the same areas, inciting further outrage, but allowed families with underage children to have adjacent seating.

== Marketing ==
=== Mascot ===
The official mascot, "Ettie" (stylised in lowercase as "ettie") was unveiled on 12 May 2018 at the TF1 Group headquarters, and was broadcast on LCI. She made her first public appearance in Paris in front of the iconic Eiffel Tower. FIFA describe her as "a young chicken with a passion for life and football" and state that "she comes from a long line of "feathered mascots" and is the daughter of Footix, the Official Mascot of the 1998 FIFA World Cup in France".

=== Sponsorships ===
| FIFA partners | National supporters |
|---|---|
| Adidas; Coca-Cola; Hyundai–Kia; Qatar Airways; Visa; Wanda Group | Arkema; Crédit Agricole; Électricité de France; Orange; PROMAN; SNCF |

== Broadcasting ==
FIFA sold the broadcasting rights for the World Cup to broadcasters through several companies. A total of 1.12 billion people globally watched the matches, and the final match attracted 82.18 million viewers, setting a new FIFA Women's World Cup record, surpassing the 2015 final. The 2019 tournament set several new viewership records for various countries.

=== Participating nations ===
| Country | Broadcaster | |
| Country | Free | Pay |
|---|---|---|
| **France (host)** | **TF1** **(French)** | **Canal+ (French)** |
| Cameroon | CRTV (English and French) | **Canal+ (French)** |
| Cameroon | CRTV (English and French) | SuperSport (English) |
| Nigeria | | SuperSport (English) |
| South Africa | | SuperSport (English) |
| Argentina | Televisión Pública | TyC Sports |
| Chile | Chilevisión | DirecTV Sports |
| Australia | SBS | Optus Sport |
| Brazil | Grupo Globo | |
| Brazil | Grupo Bandeirantes | |
| Canada | CTV (English) | TSN (English) |
| Canada | CTV (English) | RDS (French) |
| China | CCTV | |
| Germany | ARD | DAZN |
| Germany | ZDF | DAZN |
| Italy | RAI | Sky Sport |
| Jamaica | TVJ | |
| Japan | NHK | J Sports |
| Japan | Fuji TV | J Sports |
| Netherlands^{EBU} | NOS | |
| New Zealand | | Sky Sport |
| Norway | NRK | |
| Norway | TV2 | |
| South Korea | KBS | |
| South Korea | MBC | |
| Spain | Gol | |
| Sweden | SVT | |
| Sweden | TV4 | |
| Thailand | PPTV | beIN Sports |
| United Kingdom | BBC | |
| United States | Fox (English) | Fox Sports 1/2 (English) |
| United States | NBC Sports * Telemundo (Spanish) | |
| United States | NBC Sports * Telemundo (Spanish) | NBC Sports (Spanish) * Universo * NBC Sports Network (selected USWNT games) |

=== Non-participating nations ===
| Country/Region | Broadcaster | |
| Country/Region | Free | Pay |
|---|---|---|
| Afghanistan | ATN | |
| Albania^{EBU} | RTSH | |
| Andorra | Gol (Spanish) | Canal+ (French) |
| Andorra | TF1 (French) | Canal+ (French) |
| Monaco | TF1 (French) | Canal+ (French) |
| Francophone countries: French Guiana; French Polynesia; Guadeloupe; Martinique; **Mayotte**; New Caledonia; Réunion; **Saint Pierre and Miquelon**; **Wallis and Futuna**; Bold indicates not available on C+. | La 1ère (French) | Canal+ (French) |
| Sub-Saharan Africa non-participants **English language only**: Botswana; Eritrea; Eswatini; Ethiopia; Gambia; Ghana; Kenya; Lesotho; Liberia; Malawi; Namibia; Sierra Leone; Somalia; South Sudan; Sudan; Tanzania; Uganda; Zimbabwe; Zambia; **Also available in French language**: Benin; Burkina Faso; Burundi; Central African Republic; Chad; Comoros; Congo; DR Congo; Djibouti; Equatorial Guinea; Gabon; Guinea; Ivory Coast; Madagascar; Mali; Mauritania; Mauritius; Niger; Rwanda; Senegal; Seychelles; Togo; **Also available in Portuguese language**: Angola; Cape Verde; Guinea-Bissau; Mozambique; Sao Tome and Principe | | Canal+ (French) |
SuperSport (English and Portuguese)
| Armenia^{EBU} | APMTV | |
| Austria^{EBU} | ORF | |
| Azerbaijan | İTV | |
| Belarus^{EBU} | Belteleradio | |
| Belgium^{EBU} | VRT (Dutch); RTBF (French) | |
| Luxembourg^{EBU} | VRT (Dutch); RTBF (French) | |
| Bolivia | Unitel | Tigo Sports^{CTA} |
| Bolivia | Red Uno | Tigo Sports^{CTA} |
| Paraguay | | Tigo Sports^{CTA} |
| Central America: Costa Rica; Dominican Republic; El Salvador; Guatemala; Honduras; Nicaragua; Panama | | Tigo Sports^{CTA} |
| Central America: Costa Rica; Dominican Republic; El Salvador; Guatemala; Honduras; Nicaragua; Panama | Televisa | |
| Mexico | Televisa | |
| Brunei | | Astro |
| Malaysia | | Astro |
| Bulgaria^{EBU} | BNT | |
| Caribbean | | DirecTV Sports |
| South America non-participants: Colombia; Ecuador; Peru; Uruguay; Venezuela | | DirecTV Sports |
| Cambodia | | beIN Sports |
| Indonesia | | beIN Sports |
| Laos | | beIN Sports |
| Middle East and North Africa: Algeria; Bahrain; Chad; Comoros; Djibouti; Egypt; Iran; Iraq; Jordan; Kuwait; Lebanon; Libya; Mauritania; Morocco; Oman; Palestine; Qatar; Saudi Arabia; Somalia; Sudan; Syria; Tunisia; United Arab Emirates; Yemen | | beIN Sports |
| Philippines | | beIN Sports |
| Singapore | | beIN Sports |
| Timor-Leste | | beIN Sports |
| Colombia | Caracol | |
| Colombia | RCN | |
| Costa Rica | Teletica | |
| Croatia^{EBU} | HRT | |
| Curaçao | Direct Media | |
| Cyprus^{EBU} | RIK | |
| Czech Republic^{EBU} | Czech Republic | |
| Denmark | DR; SVT (except Denmark) | |
| Faroe Islands | DR; SVT (except Denmark) | |
| Greenland | DR; SVT (except Denmark) | |
| El Salvador | TCS | |
| Estonia^{EBU} | ERR | |
| Finland | YLE | |
| Honduras | TVC | |
| Hong Kong | Hong Kong Open TV | i-Cable |
| Hungary^{EBU} | MTVA | |
| Iceland^{EBU} | RÚV | |
| Indian subcontinent: Bangladesh; Bhutan; India; Maldives; Nepal; Pakistan; Sri Lanka | | SPN |
| Ireland^{EBU} | RTÉ (English) | |
| Ireland^{EBU} | TG4 (Irish) | |
| Israel^{EBU} | KAN | |
| Kosovo | RTK | |
| Latvia^{EBU} | LTV | |
| Liechtenstein^{EBU} | SRG SSR | |
| Switzerland^{EBU} | SRG SSR | |
| Lithuania^{EBU} | LRT | |
| Malta^{EBU} | PBS | |
| Montenegro^{EBU} | RTCG | |
| Nicaragua | Televicentro | |
| Nicaragua | Canal 10 | |
| North Korea | KBS | |
| North Korea | MBC | |
| North Korea | SBS | |
| North Macedonia^{EBU} | MRT | |
| Pacific | | Sky Sport |
| Peru | Latina | |
| Poland^{EBU} | TVP | |
| Portugal^{EBU} | RTP | |
| Puerto Rico | Telemundo (Spanish) | |
| Puerto Rico | Fox (English) | |
| Romania^{EBU} | TVR | |
| San Marino | RAI | Sky Sport |
| Vatican City | RAI | Sky Sport |
| Senegal | RTS | |
| Serbia^{EBU} | RTS | |
| Slovakia^{EBU} | RTVS | |
| Slovenia^{EBU} | RTVSLO | |
| Togo | New World | |
| Turkey^{EBU} | TRT | |
| Ukraine^{EBU} | UA:PBC | |
| Uruguay | Teledoce | ANTEL |
| Uruguay | Canal 4 | ANTEL |
| Uruguay | Canal 10 | ANTEL |

== Radio ==
=== Participating nations ===
| Country | Broadcaster |
|---|---|
| France (host) | Radio France |
| France (host) | Europe 1 |
| France (host) | RMC |
| France (host) | RTL |
| Argentina | TyC |
| Australia | SBS |
| Brazil | Grupo Globo |
| Brazil | Grupo Bandeirantes |
| Cameroon | CRTV |
| Chile | TyC |
| China | CNR |
| Germany | ARD |
| Italy | RAI |
| Jamaica | RJ |
| Japan | NHK |
| Netherlands^{EBU} | NOS |
| New Zealand | Radio NZ |
| Norway | NRK |
| South Korea | KBS |
| South Korea | MBC |
| South Korea | SBS |
| Sweden | SVT |
| Thailand | MCOT |
| United Kingdom | BBC |
| United Kingdom | Talksport |
| United States | Fox Sports Radio (English) |
| United States | Fútbol de Primera (Spanish) |

=== Non-participating nations ===
| Country/Region | Broadcaster |
|---|---|
| Albania^{EBU} | RTSH |
| Andorra | Radio France (French); Europe 1 (French); RMC (French); RTL (French) |
| Monaco | Radio France (French); Europe 1 (French); RMC (French); RTL (French) |
| Luxembourg^{EBU} | Radio France (French); Europe 1 (French); RMC (French); RTL (French) |
| Luxembourg^{EBU} | VRT (Dutch); RTBF (French) |
| Belgium^{EBU} | VRT (Dutch); RTBF (French) |
| Armenia^{EBU} | HR |
| Austria^{EBU} | ORF |
| Azerbaijan^{EBU} | İctimai Radio |
| Belarus^{EBU} | Belteleradio |
| Bulgaria^{EBU} | BNR |
| Caribbean | TyC |
| South America non-participants: Bolivia; Colombia; Ecuador; Paraguay; Peru; Uruguay; Venezuela | TyC |
| Central America: Costa Rica; Dominican Republic; El Salvador; Guatemala; Honduras; Nicaragua; Panama | Televisa |
| Mexico | Televisa |
| Colombia | Caracol |
| Colombia | RCN |
| Costa Rica | Teletica |
| China | CRI |
| Croatia^{EBU} | HRT |
| Cambodia | WMCAM |
| Curaçao | Direct Media |
| Cyprus^{EBU} | RIK |
| Czech Republic^{EBU} | ČR |
| Denmark | DR |
| Estonia^{EBU} | ERR |
| Finland | YLE |
| Hungary^{EBU} | MTVA |
| Iceland^{EBU} | RÚV |
| Ireland^{EBU} | RTÉ (English and Irish) |
| Israel^{EBU} | KAN |
| Latvia^{EBU} | LR |
| Liechtenstein^{EBU} | SRG SSR |
| Switzerland^{EBU} | SRG SSR |
| Lithuania^{EBU} | LRT |
| Mali | ORTM |
| Malta^{EBU} | PBS |
| Montenegro^{EBU} | RTCG |
| North Korea | KBS |
| North Korea | MBC |
| North Korea | SBS |
| North Macedonia^{EBU} | MRT |
| Pacific | Radio NZ |
| Papua New Guinea | NBC |
| Poland^{EBU} | PR |
| Portugal^{EBU} | RTP |
| Puerto Rico | Fútbol de Primera (Spanish) |
| Puerto Rico | Fox Sports Radio (English) |
| Romania^{EBU} | RR |
| Samoa | Radio Polynesia |
| San Marino | RAI |
| Vatican City | RAI |
| Senegal | RTS |
| Serbia^{EBU} | RTS |
| Slovakia^{EBU} | RTVS |
| Slovenia^{EBU} | RTVSLO |
| Tonga | Broadcom |
| Turkey^{EBU} | TRT |
| Ukraine^{EBU} | UA:PBC |
| Vanuatu | VBTC |

== Qualified UEFA teams for the Summer Olympics ==
The World Cup was used by UEFA to qualify three teams for the 2020 Summer Olympic women's football tournament in Japan, with the three European teams with the best results (considering only the round they reach) qualifying. If teams in contention for Olympic spots were eliminated in the same round, a maximum of four teams (determined by group stage results if necessary) would advance to play-offs in early 2020 to decide the remaining spot(s). However, this scenario did not happen for this tournament.

For the first time, as per the agreement between the four British football associations (England, Northern Ireland, Scotland, and Wales) for the women's team, Great Britain would attempt to qualify for the Olympics through England's performance in the World Cup (a procedure already successfully employed by Team GB in field hockey and rugby sevens), which they succeeded as England were among the three best European teams. Scotland also qualified for the World Cup but, under the agreement whereby the highest ranked home nation was nominated to compete for the purposes of Olympic qualification, their performance would not be taken into account. In effect, therefore, eight European teams competed for three qualification places during the World Cup.

The United States' win over France in the quarter-finals guaranteed that the three remaining semi-finalists, all from UEFA, qualified for the Olympics.

| Team | Qualified on | Previous appearances at the Summer Olympics (Note: Bold indicates champions for that year. Italic indicates hosts for that year.) |
|---|---|---|
| Great Britain | 28 June 2019 | 1 (2012) |
| Netherlands | 29 June 2019 | 0 (debut) |
| Sweden | 29 June 2019 | 6 (1996, 2000, 2004, 2008, 2012, 2016) |

== Controversies ==
The final's scheduling on 7 July led to a degree of criticism among supporters of women's football, as two continental men's tournament finals were held on the same day—the Copa América in Rio de Janeiro and the CONCACAF Gold Cup in Chicago. CONCACAF president Victor Montagliani described the scheduling as "a mistake", but claimed the error could not be reversed for logistical reasons. The lack of outdoor advertising across Paris, except for the Parc des Princes stadium and the temporary World Cup museum at Châtelet, was also criticised.

The Women's World Cup was the first major competition to use the updated Laws of the Game approved by the International Football Association Board (IFAB), which came into effect on 1 June 2019. Among the changes, the more severe punishment of goalkeeper encroachment during penalty kicks—including retakes after a video assistant referee review—gained the most attention and caused several successful saves to be disallowed in the group stage. The use of the Women's World Cup as a "guinea pig" for the new changes to the rules was also criticised by some footballers and coaches for being potentially sexist, as several concurrent men's continental competitions had not implemented them. Pierluigi Collina, head of referees for FIFA, denied the claim, stating that it had long been customary for rule changes to be introduced in June, before major tournaments. Following widespread criticism and a request from FIFA, the IFAB issued a temporary dispensation to waive the requirement to show goalkeepers a yellow card for stepping off the line during a penalty shoot-out during the knockout stage of the Women's World Cup.

The round of 16 fixture between England and Cameroon was marred by misbehaviour of some Cameroonian players, who refused to kick off for several minutes after the second English goal, deliberately fouled several players, and argued with the referee while huddling around her. Cameroonian defender Augustine Ejangue was also seen on camera spitting at English winger Toni Duggan after conceding an indirect free kick in the penalty area, from which England later scored. After the match, England manager Phil Neville said it "didn't feel like football" and that he was "completely and utterly ashamed of the opposition". The Confederation of African Football (CAF) condemned some of the players' actions, while also criticising the refereeing. Cameroon felt three crucial decisions were unjust, two of which involved the video assistant referee (VAR). FIFA announced that it would investigate the match.
