= Milagros Menéndez =

Argentine footballer (born 1997)

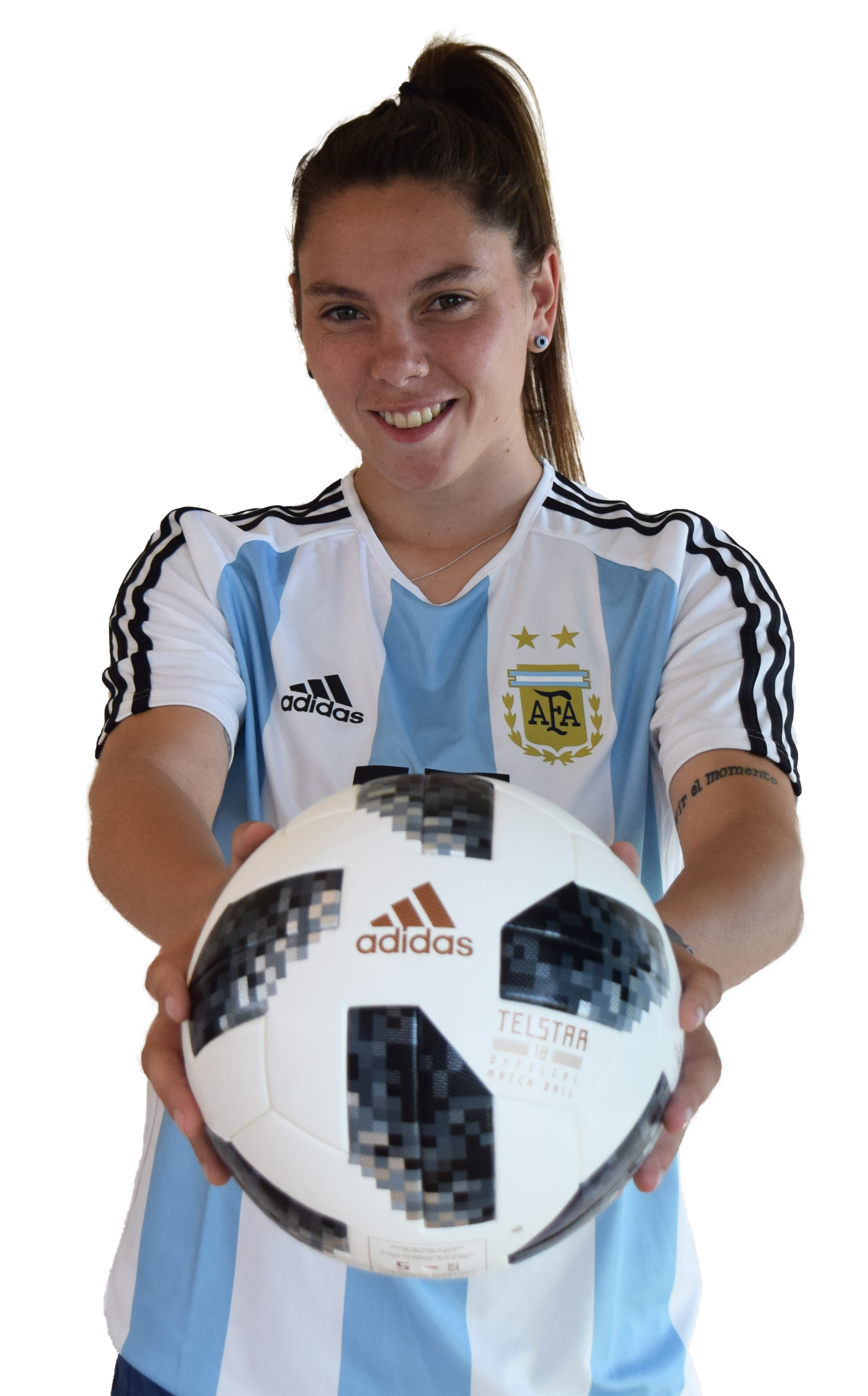
- Menéndez with Argentina in 2018

Personal information
- Full name: Milagros Abigail Menéndez
- Date of birth: 23 March 1997 (age 29)
- Place of birth: Mar del Plata, Argentina
- Height: 1.69 m (5 ft 7 in)
- Position: Forward

Team information
- Current team: Al-Amal
- Number: 32

Senior career*
Years	Team	Apps	(Gls)
2013–2015	General Urquiza		
2016–2019	UAI Urquiza		
2019–2020	Racing Club	15	(10)
2020–2021	Granada	7	(0)
2021–2022	Elche	28	(4)
2022–2024	Racing Club		
2024	→ Santos (loan)	10	(1)
2025–	Al-Amal	0	(0)

International career
2018–	Argentina	13	(3)
Medal record
Women's football
Representing Argentina
Pan American Games
Silver medal – second place	2019 Lima	Team
- * Club domestic league appearances and goals as of 21:00, 19 December 2024 (UTC)

Milagros Abigail "Mili" Menéndez (born 23 March 1997) is an Argentine professional footballer who plays as a forward for Saudi club Al-Amal, and the Argentina women's national team.

== Club career ==
A successful kart racing driver as a teenager, Menéndez began her career playing an Asociación de Futbol Femenino de la Provincia de Buenos Aires (AFFEBA) national tournament for General Urquiza FC of Mar del Plata before being transferred to UAI Urquiza in 2015. On 23 August 2019, she was presented at Racing Club after signing her first professional contract.

On 1 July 2020, Menéndez moved abroad and signed for Segunda División Pro club Granada CF on a two-year contract. On 3 August of the following year, after featuring rarely, she moved to Elche CF.

In July 2022, Menéndez returned to Racing. On 2 February 2024, she was announced at Santos on a one-year loan deal, with a buyout clause.

On 13 January 2025, Menéndez moved to Saudi Arabia with Al-Amal.

== International career ==
Menéndez was selected by the senior team of Argentina for the 2019 FIFA Women's World Cup. On 19 June that year, during the tournament, she scored her first international goal, in a 3–3 group stage draw against Scotland.

== Career statistics ==
=== International ===
As of 13 February 2024

National team	Year	Apps	Goals
Argentina	2019	10	3
Argentina	2021	1	0
Argentina	2022	2	0
Total		13	3

==== International goals ====
Scores and results list Argentina's goal tally first

No.	Date	Venue	Opponent	Score	Result	Competition
1	19 June 2019	Parc des Princes, Paris, France	Scotland	1–3	3–3	2019 FIFA Women's World Cup
2	12 November 2019	Centro de Entrenamiento de Ezeiza, Ezeiza, Buenos Aires, Argentina	Colombia	1–1	2–2	Friendly
3	12 November 2019	Centro de Entrenamiento de Ezeiza, Ezeiza, Buenos Aires, Argentina	Colombia	2–2	2–2	Friendly

== Honours ==
Santos

- Copa Paulista de Futebol Feminino: 2024
