= Roazhon Park =

Football stadium in France

Coordinates: 48°6′27″N 1°42′46″W

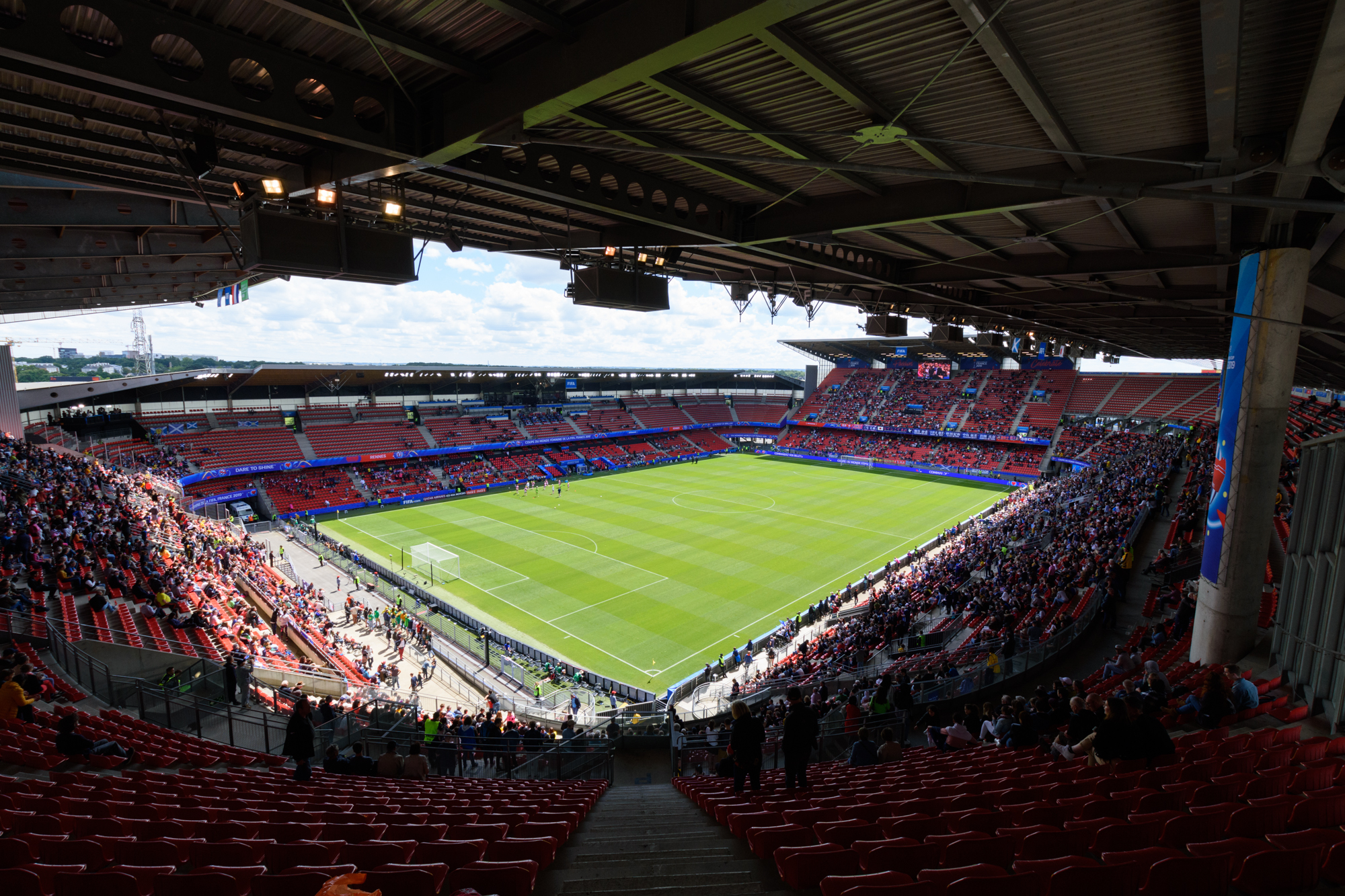
- Interactive map of Roazhon Park
- Full name: Roazhon Park
- Former names: Stade de la Route de Lorient (1912–2015)
- Location: 111 Route de Lorient; 35000 Rennes; France
- Owner: City of Rennes
- Capacity: 29,778
- Surface: AirFibr (hybrid grass)
- Record attendance: 29,490 (Stade Rennais - Olympique de Marseille, 20 August 2005)
- Field size: 105 x 68 m

Construction
- Opened: 15 September 1912
- Renovated: 1939, 1955–1957, 1987, 1999–2004
- Expanded: 2004
- Cost: 37.3 million Euros (1999–2004 renovation)
- Architect: Bruno Gaudin (1999–2004 renovation)

Tenant
- Stade Rennais (1912–present)

Roazhon Park is a football stadium in Rennes, Brittany, France. Roazhon [ˈrwɑːõn] or [ˈrwaː.zən] is the Breton name of Rennes.

The stadium was inaugurated on 15 September 1912. It is located at 111 route de Lorient, in west-central Rennes. Rebuilt in 2001 and able to seat 29,778, the stadium is currently the home of Stade Rennais.

The stadium has hosted France men's and women's national football team matches. On 19 and 20 June 2016 it hosted the semifinals of the Top 14 rugby union tournament. It was also selected as a venue for the 2019 FIFA Women's World Cup, in which it hosted six matches: four in the group stage, one in the Round of 16, and one quarter final.

== 2019 FIFA Women's World Cup matches ==
Date	Time (CEST)	Team #1	Result	Team #2	Round	Attendance
8 June 2019	15:00	Germany	1–0	China	Group B	15,283
11 June 2019	18:00	Chile	0–2	Sweden	Group F	15,875
14 June 2019	15:00	Japan	2–1	Scotland	Group D	13,201
17 June 2019	21:00	Nigeria	0–1	France	Group A	28,267
20 June 2019	21:00	Thailand	0–2	Chile	Group F	13,567
25 June 2019	21:00	Netherlands	2–1	Japan	Round of 16	21,076
29 June 2019	18:30	Germany	1–2	Sweden	Quarter-finals	25,301
