= 2019 FIFA Women's World Cup Group E =

Football tournament group stage

Group E of the 2019 FIFA Women's World Cup took place from 10 to 20 June 2019. The group consisted of Cameroon, Canada, the Netherlands and New Zealand. The top two teams, the Netherlands and Canada, along with the third-placed team, Cameroon (as one of the four best third-placed teams), advanced to the round of 16.

== Teams ==
Draw position	Team	Pot	Confederation	Method of qualification	Date of qualification	Finals appearance	Last appearance	Previous best performance	FIFA Rankings	
Draw position	Team	Pot	Confederation	Method of qualification	Date of qualification	Finals appearance	Last appearance	Previous best performance	December 2018 (Note: The rankings of December 2018 were used for seeding for the final draw.)	March 2019
E1	Canada	1	CONCACAF	CONCACAF Women's Championship runners-up	14 October 2018	7th	2015	Fourth place (2003)	5	5
E2	Cameroon	4	CAF	Africa Women Cup of Nations 3rd place	30 November 2018	2nd	2015	Round of 16 (2015)	46	46
E3	New Zealand	3	OFC	OFC Women's Nations Cup champions	1 December 2018	5th	2015	Group stage (1991, 2007, 2011, 2015)	19	19
E4	Netherlands	2	UEFA	UEFA play-off winners	13 November 2018	2nd	2015	Round of 16 (2015)	7	8

== Standings ==
Pos	Team	Pld	W	D	L	GF	GA	GD	Pts	Qualification
1	Netherlands	3	3	0	0	6	2	+4	9	Advance to knockout stage
2	Canada	3	2	0	1	4	2	+2	6	Advance to knockout stage
3	Cameroon	3	1	0	2	3	5	−2	3	Advance to knockout stage
4	New Zealand	3	0	0	3	1	5	−4	0	

Source: FIFA
Rules for classification: Group stage tiebreakers

In the round of 16:

- The winners of Group E, the Netherlands, advanced to play the runners-up of Group D, Japan.
- The runners-up of Group E, Canada, advanced to play the runners-up of Group F, Sweden.
- The third-placed team of Group E, Cameroon, advanced to play the winners of Group D, England (as one of the four best third-placed teams).

== Matches ==
All times listed are local, CEST (UTC+2).

=== Canada vs Cameroon ===
10 June 2019
21:00

Canada	1–0	Cameroon
Buchanan 45'	Report

Stade de la Mosson, Montpellier
Attendance: 10,710
Referee: Ri Hyang-ok (North Korea)

Canada	Cameroon

GK	1	Stephanie Labbé
RB	10	Ashley Lawrence
CB	3	Kadeisha Buchanan
CB	4	Shelina Zadorsky
LB	2	Allysha Chapman
RM	15	Nichelle Prince	(substituted off) 75'
CM	11	Desiree Scott
CM	13	Sophie Schmidt
LM	16	Janine Beckie
CF	12	Christine Sinclair (c)
CF	17	Jessie Fleming
Substitutions:
FW	6	Deanne Rose	(substituted in) 75'
Manager:
(Denmark) Kenneth Heiner-Møller

GK	1	Annette Ngo Ndom
CB	11	Aurelle Awona
CB	2	Christine Manie (c)
CB	6	Estelle Johnson
RWB	4	Yvonne Leuko
LWB	12	Claudine Meffometou
RM	3	Ajara Nchout		(substituted off) 67'
CM	8	Raissa Feudjio
CM	10	Jeannette Yango		(substituted off) 82'
LM	7	Gabrielle Onguéné
CF	19	Marlyse Ngo Ndoumbouk	(yellow card) 37'	(substituted off) 68'
Substitutions:
FW	18	Henriette Akaba		(substituted in) 67'
FW	17	Gaëlle Enganamouit	(yellow card) 74'	(substituted in) 68'
MF	13	Charlène Meyong		(substituted in) 82'
Manager:
Alain Djeumfa

Player of the Match:
Kadeisha Buchanan (Canada)

Assistant referees:
Hong Kum-nyo (North Korea)
Kim Kyoung-min (South Korea)
Fourth official:
Qin Liang (China PR)
Reserve assistant referee:
Lee Seul-gi (South Korea)
Video assistant referee:
Massimiliano Irrati (Italy)
Assistant video assistant referees:
Mohammed Abdulla Hassan Mohamed (United Arab Emirates)
Sian Massey-Ellis (England)

=== New Zealand vs Netherlands ===
11 June 2019
15:00

New Zealand	0–1	Netherlands
	Report	Roord 90+2'

Stade Océane, Le Havre
Attendance: 10,654
Referee: Edina Alves Batista (Brazil)

New Zealand	Netherlands

GK	1	Erin Nayler
RB	4	C. J. Bott
CB	6	Rebekah Stott
CB	8	Abby Erceg
LB	7	Ali Riley (c)
DM	2	Ria Percival
CM	14	Katie Bowen
CM	13	Rosie White	(substituted off) 73'
RM	12	Betsy Hassett	(substituted off) 67'
LM	22	Olivia Chance
CF	11	Sarah Gregorius	(substituted off) 73'
Substitutions:
MF	10	Annalie Longo	(substituted in) 67'
FW	19	Paige Satchell	(substituted in) 73'
FW	17	Hannah Wilkinson	(substituted in) 73'
Manager:
(Scotland) Tom Sermanni

GK	1	Sari van Veenendaal (c)
RB	2	Desiree van Lunteren
CB	3	Stefanie van der Gragt
CB	20	Dominique Bloodworth
LB	5	Kika van Es	(substituted off) 70'
CM	14	Jackie Groenen	(substituted off) 75'
CM	10	Daniëlle van de Donk
CM	8	Sherida Spitse
RF	7	Shanice van de Sanden	(substituted off) 86'
CF	9	Vivianne Miedema
LF	11	Lieke Martens
Substitutions:
DF	4	Merel van Dongen	(substituted in) 70'
MF	19	Jill Roord	(substituted in) 75'
FW	21	Lineth Beerensteyn	(substituted in) 86'
Manager:
Sarina Wiegman

Player of the Match:
Lieke Martens (Netherlands)

Assistant referees:
Neuza Back (Brazil)
Tatiane Sacilotti (Brazil)
Fourth official:
María Carvajal (Chile)
Reserve assistant referee:
Mónica Amboya (Ecuador)
Video assistant referee:
Carlos del Cerro Grande (Spain)
Assistant video assistant referees:
Tiago Martins (Portugal)
Felisha Mariscal (United States)

=== Netherlands vs Cameroon ===
15 June 2019
15:00

Netherlands	3–1	Cameroon
Miedema 41', 85'; Bloodworth 48'	Report	Onguéné 43'

Stade du Hainaut, Valenciennes
Attendance: 22,423
Referee: Casey Reibelt (Australia)

Netherlands	Cameroon

GK	1	Sari van Veenendaal (c)
RB	2	Desiree van Lunteren
CB	20	Dominique Bloodworth
CB	6	Anouk Dekker
LB	5	Kika van Es	(substituted off) 86'
CM	8	Sherida Spitse
CM	10	Daniëlle van de Donk	(substituted off) 71'
CM	14	Jackie Groenen
RF	7	Shanice van de Sanden	(substituted off) 66'
CF	9	Vivianne Miedema
LF	11	Lieke Martens
Substitutions:
FW	21	Lineth Beerensteyn	(substituted in) 66'
MF	19	Jill Roord	(substituted in) 71'
DF	4	Merel van Dongen	(substituted in) 86'
Manager:
Sarina Wiegman

GK	1	Annette Ngo Ndom
CB	4	Yvonne Leuko
CB	2	Christine Manie (c)	(yellow card) 14'
CB	6	Estelle Johnson
RWB	8	Raissa Feudjio	(yellow card) 68'
LWB	12	Claudine Meffometou
RM	22	Michaela Abam		(substituted off) 60'
CM	10	Jeannette Yango
CM	20	Genevieve Ngo Mbeleck	(yellow card) 37'	(substituted off) 66'
LM	7	Gabrielle Onguéné
CF	17	Gaëlle Enganamouit		(substituted off) 75'
Substitutions:
FW	3	Ajara Nchout		(substituted in) 60'
MF	13	Charlène Meyong		(substituted in) 66'
FW	18	Henriette Akaba		(substituted in) 75'
Manager:
Alain Djeumfa

Player of the Match:
Vivianne Miedema (Netherlands)

Assistant referees:
Lee Seul-gi (South Korea)
Maiko Hagio (Japan)
Fourth official:
Katja Koroleva (United States)
Reserve assistant referee:
Mária Súkeníková (Slovakia)
Video assistant referee:
Paolo Valeri (Italy)
Assistant video assistant referees:
Mauro Vigliano (Argentina)
Mayte Chávez (Mexico)

=== Canada vs New Zealand ===
15 June 2019
21:00

Canada	2–0	New Zealand
Fleming 48'; Prince 79'	Report

Stade des Alpes, Grenoble
Attendance: 14,856
Referee: Yoshimi Yamashita (Japan)

Canada	New Zealand

GK	1	Stephanie Labbé
RB	8	Jayde Riviere	(substituted off) 75'
CB	3	Kadeisha Buchanan
CB	4	Shelina Zadorsky
LB	10	Ashley Lawrence
RM	15	Nichelle Prince	(substituted off) 84'
CM	11	Desiree Scott
CM	13	Sophie Schmidt
LM	16	Janine Beckie	(substituted off) 83'
CF	12	Christine Sinclair (c)
CF	17	Jessie Fleming
Substitutions:
DF	2	Allysha Chapman	(substituted in) 75'
DF	5	Quinn (Note: Then known as Rebecca Quinn)	(substituted in) 83'
FW	19	Adriana Leon	(substituted in) 84'
Manager:
(Denmark) Kenneth Heiner-Møller

GK	1	Erin Nayler
RB	4	C. J. Bott	(substituted off) 18'
CB	6	Rebekah Stott
CB	8	Abby Erceg
LB	7	Ali Riley (c)
RM	22	Olivia Chance
CM	2	Ria Percival
CM	14	Katie Bowen
LM	12	Betsy Hassett	(substituted off) 85'
CF	11	Sarah Gregorius	(substituted off) 62'
CF	13	Rosie White
Substitutions:
MF	10	Annalie Longo	(substituted in) 18'
DF	3	Anna Green	(substituted in) 62'
FW	9	Emma Kete	(substituted in) 85'
Manager:
(Scotland) Tom Sermanni

Player of the Match:
Jessie Fleming (Canada)

Assistant referees:
Naomi Teshirogi (Japan)
Makoto Bozono (Japan)
Fourth official:
Kate Jacewicz (Australia)
Reserve assistant referee:
Sanja Rođak-Karšić (Croatia)
Video assistant referee:
José María Sánchez Martínez (Spain)
Assistant video assistant referees:
Paweł Gil (Poland)
Kathryn Nesbitt (United States)

=== Netherlands vs Canada ===
20 June 2019
18:00

Netherlands	2–1	Canada
Dekker 54'; Beerensteyn 75'	Report	Sinclair 60'

Stade Auguste-Delaune, Reims
Attendance: 19,277
Referee: Stéphanie Frappart (France)

Netherlands	Canada

GK	1	Sari van Veenendaal (c)
RB	2	Desiree van Lunteren
CB	6	Anouk Dekker	(yellow card) 23'
CB	20	Dominique Bloodworth
LB	4	Merel van Dongen
CM	8	Sherida Spitse		(substituted off) 70'
CM	10	Daniëlle van de Donk		(substituted off) 87'
CM	14	Jackie Groenen
RF	7	Shanice van de Sanden
CF	9	Vivianne Miedema
LF	11	Lieke Martens		(substituted off) 70'
Substitutions:
MF	19	Jill Roord	(yellow card) 90'	(substituted in) 70'
FW	21	Lineth Beerensteyn		(substituted in) 70'
FW	13	Renate Jansen		(substituted in) 87'
Manager:
Sarina Wiegman

GK	1	Stephanie Labbé
RB	10	Ashley Lawrence
CB	3	Kadeisha Buchanan	(yellow card) 38'
CB	4	Shelina Zadorsky
LB	2	Allysha Chapman		(substituted off) 69'
CM	17	Jessie Fleming
CM	11	Desiree Scott		(substituted off) 79'
CM	13	Sophie Schmidt
RF	9	Jordyn Huitema
CF	12	Christine Sinclair (c)		(substituted off) 68'
LF	16	Janine Beckie
Substitutions:
FW	19	Adriana Leon		(substituted in) 68'
DF	8	Jayde Riviere		(substituted in) 69'
DF	5	Quinn	(yellow card) 80'	(substituted in) 79'
Manager:
(Denmark) Kenneth Heiner-Møller

Player of the Match:
Christine Sinclair (Canada)

Assistant referees:
Manuela Nicolosi (France)
Michelle O'Neill (Republic of Ireland)
Fourth official:
Salima Mukansanga (Rwanda)
Reserve assistant referee:
Stephanie-Dale Yee Sing (Jamaica)
Video assistant referee:
Felix Zwayer (Germany)
Assistant video assistant referees:
Sascha Stegemann (Germany)
Neuza Back (Brazil)

=== Cameroon vs New Zealand ===
20 June 2019
18:00

Cameroon	2–1	New Zealand
Nchout 57', 90+5'	Report	Awona 80' (o.g.)

Stade de la Mosson, Montpellier
Attendance: 8,009
Referee: Kateryna Monzul (Ukraine)

Cameroon	New Zealand

GK	1	Annette Ngo Ndom
CB	4	Yvonne Leuko
CB	5	Augustine Ejangue
CB	6	Estelle Johnson
RWB	8	Raissa Feudjio
LWB	11	Aurelle Awona
RM	22	Michaela Abam
CM	3	Ajara Nchout
CM	10	Jeannette Yango		(substituted off) 84'
LM	7	Gabrielle Onguéné (c)
CF	17	Gaëlle Enganamouit		(substituted off) 54'
Substitutions:
FW	21	Alexandra Takounda	(yellow card) 69'	(substituted in) 54'
MF	14	Ninon Abena		(substituted in) 84'
Manager:
Alain Djeumfa

GK	1	Erin Nayler
CB	6	Rebekah Stott
CB	8	Abby Erceg
CB	3	Anna Green	(yellow card) 68'	(substituted off) 68'
RWB	14	Katie Bowen
LWB	7	Ali Riley (c)
CM	2	Ria Percival
CM	16	Katie Duncan		(substituted off) 68'
CM	22	Olivia Chance		(substituted off) 88'
CF	11	Sarah Gregorius
CF	13	Rosie White
Substitutions:
MF	12	Betsy Hassett		(substituted in) 68'
FW	17	Hannah Wilkinson		(substituted in) 68'
MF	10	Annalie Longo		(substituted in) 88'
Manager:
(Scotland) Tom Sermanni

Player of the Match:
Ajara Nchout (Cameroon)

Assistant referees:
Maryna Striletska (Ukraine)
Oleksandra Ardasheva (Ukraine)
Fourth official:
Sandra Braz (Portugal)
Reserve assistant referee:
Julia Magnusson (Sweden)
Video assistant referee:
Massimiliano Irrati (Italy)
Assistant video assistant referees:
Bastian Dankert (Germany)
Lisa Rashid (England)

== Discipline ==
Fair play points would have been used as tiebreakers in the group if the overall and head-to-head records of teams were tied, or if teams had the same record in the ranking of third-placed teams. These were calculated based on yellow and red cards received in all group matches as follows:

- first yellow card: minus 1 point;
- indirect red card (second yellow card): minus 3 points;
- direct red card: minus 4 points;
- yellow card and direct red card: minus 5 points;

Only one of the above deductions were applied to a player in a single match.

Team	Match 1				Match 2				Match 3				Points
Team	Booked	(yellow card) (yellow-red card)	Sent off (straight red)	(yellow card) (red card)	Booked	(yellow card) (yellow-red card)	Sent off (straight red)	(yellow card) (red card)	Booked	(yellow card) (yellow-red card)	Sent off (straight red)	(yellow card) (red card)	Points
New Zealand									1				−1
Canada									2				−2
Netherlands									2				−2
Cameroon	2				3				1				−6

== See also ==
- Cameroon at the FIFA Women's World Cup
- Canada at the FIFA Women's World Cup
- Netherlands at the FIFA Women's World Cup
- New Zealand at the FIFA Women's World Cup
