= 2019 FIFA Women's World Cup statistics =

These are statistics for the 2019 FIFA Women's World Cup, which took place in France from 7 June to 7 July 2019. Goals, assist, performance analyses, and squad performance are shown here. Goals scored in penalty shoot-outs are not counted, and matches decided by penalty shoot-outs are counted as draws.

== Goalscorers ==
There were 146 goals scored in 52 matches, for an average of 2.81 goals per match.

6 goals

- (England) Ellen White
- (United States) Alex Morgan
- (United States) Megan Rapinoe

5 goals

- (Australia) Sam Kerr

4 goals

- (Brazil) Cristiane
- (France) Wendie Renard

3 goals

- (Germany) Sara Däbritz
- (Italy) Aurora Galli
- (Italy) Cristiana Girelli
- (Netherlands) Vivianne Miedema
- (Spain) Jennifer Hermoso
- (Sweden) Kosovare Asllani
- (United States) Rose Lavelle
- (United States) Carli Lloyd

2 goals

- (Brazil) Marta
- (Cameroon) Ajara Nchout
- (France) Valérie Gauvin
- (France) Amandine Henry
- (France) Eugénie Le Sommer
- (Germany) Lina Magull
- (Germany) Alexandra Popp
- (Italy) Barbara Bonansea
- (Netherlands) Lieke Martens
- (Norway) Isabell Herlovsen
- (Sweden) Stina Blackstenius
- (Sweden) Sofia Jakobsson
- (United States) Lindsey Horan
- (United States) Sam Mewis

1 goal

- (Argentina) Florencia Bonsegundo
- (Argentina) Milagros Menéndez
- (Australia) Caitlin Foord
- (Australia) Elise Kellond-Knight
- (Australia) Chloe Logarzo
- (Brazil) Thaisa
- (Cameroon) Gabrielle Onguéné
- (Canada) Kadeisha Buchanan
- (Canada) Jessie Fleming
- (Canada) Nichelle Prince
- (Canada) Christine Sinclair
- (Chile) María José Urrutia
- (China) Li Ying
- (England) Lucy Bronze
- (England) Alex Greenwood
- (England) Steph Houghton
- (England) Fran Kirby
- (England) Nikita Parris
- (England) Jill Scott
- (England) Jodie Taylor
- (Germany) Giulia Gwinn
- (Germany) Melanie Leupolz
- (Germany) Lea Schüller
- (Italy) Valentina Giacinti
- (Jamaica) Havana Solaun
- (Japan) Yui Hasegawa
- (Japan) Mana Iwabuchi
- (Japan) Yuika Sugasawa
- (Netherlands) Lineth Beerensteyn
- (Netherlands) Dominique Bloodworth
- (Netherlands) Anouk Dekker
- (Netherlands) Stefanie van der Gragt
- (Netherlands) Jackie Groenen
- (Netherlands) Jill Roord
- (Nigeria) Asisat Oshoala
- (Norway) Caroline Graham Hansen
- (Norway) Guro Reiten
- (Norway) Lisa-Marie Karlseng Utland
- (Scotland) Jen Beattie
- (Scotland) Lana Clelland
- (Scotland) Erin Cuthbert
- (Scotland) Claire Emslie
- (Scotland) Kim Little
- (South Africa) Thembi Kgatlana
- (South Korea) Yeo Min-ji
- (Spain) Lucía García
- (Sweden) Lina Hurtig
- (Sweden) Madelen Janogy
- (Sweden) Fridolina Rolfö
- (Sweden) Elin Rubensson
- (Sweden) Linda Sembrant
- (Thailand) Kanjana Sungngoen
- (United States) Julie Ertz
- (United States) Christen Press
- (United States) Mallory Pugh

1 own goal

- (Brazil) Mônica (against Australia)
- (Cameroon) Aurelle Awona (against New Zealand)
- (France) Wendie Renard (against Norway)
- (Nigeria) Osinachi Ohale (against Norway)
- (Scotland) Lee Alexander (against Argentina)
- (South Korea) Kim Do-yeon (against Nigeria)
- (Sweden) Jonna Andersson (against United States)
- (Thailand) Waraporn Boonsing (against Chile)

Source: FIFA

== Assists ==
4 assists

- (Netherlands) Sherida Spitse

3 assists

- (England) Beth Mead
- (France) Amel Majri
- (Italy) Manuela Giugliano
- (United States) Sam Mewis
- (United States) Alex Morgan
- (United States) Megan Rapinoe

2 assists

- (Brazil) Andressa Alves
- (England) Lucy Bronze
- (England) Toni Duggan
- (France) Gaëtane Thiney
- (United States) Tierna Davidson
- (United States) Lindsey Horan
- (United States) Kelley O'Hara

1 assist

- (Argentina) Dalila Ippólito
- (Australia) Ellie Carpenter
- (Australia) Emily Gielnik
- (Australia) Katrina Gorry
- (Australia) Chloe Logarzo
- (Brazil) Debinha
- (Cameroon) Raissa Feudjio
- (Cameroon) Yvonne Leuko
- (Canada) Janine Beckie
- (Canada) Ashley Lawrence
- (Canada) Nichelle Prince
- (Chile) Yessenia López
- (China) Zhang Rui
- (England) Karen Carney
- (England) Fran Kirby
- (England) Nikita Parris
- (England) Jill Scott
- (England) Georgia Stanway
- (France) Kadidiatou Diani
- (France) Amandine Henry
- (France) Eugénie Le Sommer
- (Germany) Sara Däbritz
- (Germany) Giulia Gwinn
- (Germany) Lina Magull
- (Germany) Verena Schweers
- (Italy) Lisa Boattin
- (Italy) Valentina Cernoia
- (Italy) Alia Guagni
- (Jamaica) Khadija Shaw
- (Japan) Jun Endo
- (Japan) Mana Iwabuchi
- (Netherlands) Lineth Beerensteyn
- (Netherlands) Desiree van Lunteren
- (Netherlands) Shanice van de Sanden
- (Nigeria) Chidinma Okeke
- (Norway) Caroline Graham Hansen
- (Norway) Guro Reiten
- (Norway) Karina Sævik
- (Scotland) Erin Cuthbert
- (Scotland) Lisa Evans
- (Scotland) Caroline Weir
- (South Africa) Linda Motlhalo
- (South Korea) Lee Geum-min
- (Spain) Lucía García
- (Spain) Virginia Torrecilla
- (Sweden) Anna Anvegård
- (Sweden) Kosovare Asllani
- (Sweden) Stina Blackstenius
- (Sweden) Magdalena Eriksson
- (Sweden) Elin Rubensson
- (Sweden) Linda Sembrant
- (Thailand) Taneekarn Dangda
- (United States) Crystal Dunn
- (United States) Tobin Heath
- (United States) Christen Press
- (United States) Mallory Pugh

Source: FIFA Technical Report

== Scoring ==
=== Overall ===
- Total number of goals scored: 146
- Average goals per match: 2.81
- Total number of braces: 13
  Barbara Bonansea, Aurora Galli, Jennifer Hermoso, Rose Lavelle, Carli Lloyd, Lieke Martens, Sam Mewis, Vivianne Miedema, Ajara Nchout, Megan Rapinoe (2), Wendie Renard, Ellen White
- Total number of hat-tricks: 2
  Cristiane, Cristiana Girelli
- Total number of penalty kicks awarded: 25
- Total number of penalty kicks scored: 18
  Florencia Bonsegundo, Sara Däbritz, Cristiana Girelli, Caroline Graham Hansen, Isabell Herlovsen, Jennifer Hermoso (2), Eugénie Le Sommer, Marta (2), Lieke Martens, Nikita Parris, Megan Rapinoe (3), Wendie Renard, Elin Rubensson, Yuika Sugasawa
- Total number of penalty kicks missed or saved: 7
  Janine Beckie, Steph Houghton, Sam Kerr, Francisca Lara, Carli Lloyd, Nikita Parris (2)
- Penalty kick success rate: 72%
- Own goals scored: 8
  Lee Alexander, Jonna Andersson, Aurelle Awona, Waraporn Boonsing, Mônica, Osinachi Ohale, Wendie Renard, Kim Do-yeon

=== Timing ===
- First goal of the tournament: Eugénie Le Sommer for France against South Korea
- First brace of the tournament: Wendie Renard for France against South Korea
- First hat-trick of the tournament: Cristiane for Brazil against Jamaica
- Last goal of the tournament: Rose Lavelle for United States against Netherlands
- Last brace of the tournament: Megan Rapinoe for United States against France
- Last hat-trick of the tournament: Cristiana Girelli for Italy against Jamaica
- Fastest goal in a match from kickoff: 3rd minute

Jill Scott for England against Norway

- Fastest goal in a match after coming on as a substitute:
- Latest goal in a match without extra time: 90+6th minute

Elin Rubensson for Sweden against Thailand

- Latest goal in a match with extra time: 107th minute

Amandine Henry for France against Brazil

- Latest winning goal in a match without extra time: 95th minute

Ajara Nchout for Senegal against New Zealand

- Latest winning goal in a match with extra time: 107th minute

Amandine Henry for France against Brazil

- Shortest time difference between two goals scored by the same team in a match: 1 minute

Alex Morgan and Sam Mewis for United States against Thailand

=== Teams ===
- Most goals scored by a team: 26

United States

- Fewest goals scored by a team: 1

China, Jamaica, New Zealand, South Africa, South Korea, Thailand

- Most goals conceded by a team: 20

Thailand

- Fewest goals conceded by a team: 2

Germany

- Best goal difference: +23

United States

- Worst goal difference: –19

Thailand

- Most goals scored in a match by both teams: 13

United States 13–0 Thailand

- Most goals scored in a match by one team: 13

United States against Thailand

- Most goals scored in a match by the losing team: 2

Brazil against Australia

- Biggest margin of victory: 13 goals

United States 13–0 Thailand

- Most clean sheets achieved by a team: 4

Germany and United States

- Fewest clean sheets achieved by a team: 0

Australia, Cameroon, Jamaica, New Zealand, Scotland, South Africa, South Korea, Thailand

- Most clean sheets given by an opposing team: 3

China

- Fewest clean sheets given by an opposing team: 0

Australia, Brazil, England, France, Germany, Scotland, United States

- Most consecutive clean sheets achieved by a team: 4

Germany
Most consecutive clean sheets given by an opposing team: 2
Argentina, China, Jamaica, New Zealand, Nigeria, South Africa, South Korea, Spain

=== Individual ===
- Most goals scored by an individual: 6
  Alex Morgan, Megan Rapinoe, Ellen White
- Most assists provided by an individual: 4
  Sherida Spitse
- Most goals and assists produced by an individual: 9
  Alex Morgan, Megan Rapinoe (6 goals, 3 assists)
- Most clean sheets achieved by a goalkeeper: 4
  Alyssa Naeher, Almuth Schult
- Most consecutive clean sheets achieved by a goalkeeper: 3
  Almuth Schult
- Most goals scored by one player in a match: 5

Alex Morgan for United States against Thailand

== Wins and losses ==
- Most wins: 7 – United States
- Fewest wins: 0 – Argentina, Jamaica, New Zealand, Scotland, South Africa, South Korea, Thailand
- Most losses: 3 – Cameroon, Jamaica, New Zealand, Nigeria, South Africa, South Korea, Thailand
- Fewest losses: 0 – United States
- Most draws: 2 – Argentina
- Fewest draws: 0 – Brazil, Cameroon, Canada, Chile, England, France, Germany, Italy, Jamaica, Netherlands, New Zealand, Nigeria, South Africa, South Korea, Sweden, Thailand, United States

== Match awards ==
=== Player of the Match ===
Rank	Name	Team	Opponent	Awards
1	Megan Rapinoe	United States	Spain (R16), France (QF), Netherlands (F)	3
2	Kosovare Asllani	Sweden	Chile (GS), Thailand (GS)	2
2	Sara Däbritz	Germany	Spain (GS), South Africa (GS)	2
2	Caroline Graham Hansen	Norway	South Korea (GS), Australia (R16)	2
2	Sofia Jakobsson	Sweden	Germany (QF), England (TP)	2
2	Lieke Martens	Netherlands	New Zealand (GS), Japan (R16)	2
2	Vivianne Miedema	Netherlands	Cameroon (GS), Italy (QF)	2
2	Alex Morgan	United States	Thailand (GS), England (SF)	2
2	Wendie Renard	France	South Korea (GS), Nigeria (GS)	2

=== Clean sheets ===
Rank	Name	Team	Opponent	Awards
1	Alyssa Naeher	United States	Thailand (GS), Chile (GS), Sweden (GS), Netherlands (F)	4
1	Almuth Schult	Germany	China PR (GS), Spain (GS), South Africa (GS), Nigeria (R16)	4
3	Karen Bardsley	England	Japan (GS), Cameroon (R16), Norway (QF)	3
3	Sari van Veenendaal	Netherlands	New Zealand (GS), Italy (QF), Sweden (SF)	3
5	Bárbara	Brazil	Jamaica (GS), Italy (GS)	2
5	Sarah Bouhaddi	France	South Korea (GS), Nigeria (GS)	2
5	Hedvig Lindahl	Sweden	Chile (GS), Canada (R16)	2
5	Laura Giuliani	Italy	Jamaica (GS), China (R16)	2
5	Stephanie Labbé	Canada	Cameroon (GS), New Zealand (GS)	2
5	Peng Shimeng	China	South Africa (GS), Spain (GS)	2

== Discipline ==
A player was automatically suspended for the next match for the following offences:

- Receiving a red card (red card suspensions could be extended for serious offences)
- Receiving two yellow cards in two matches; yellow cards expired after the completion of the quarter-finals (yellow card suspensions were not carried forward to any other future international matches)

The following suspensions were served during the tournament:

Player	Offence(s)	Suspension
(Netherlands) Anouk Dekker	(red card) in qualifying vs Switzerland (13 November 2018)	Group E vs New Zealand (matchday 1; 11 June)
(South Africa) Nothando Vilakazi	(yellow card) (yellow-red card) in Group B vs Spain (matchday 1; 8 June)	Group B vs China PR (matchday 2; 13 June)
(Brazil) Formiga	(yellow card) in Group C vs Jamaica (matchday 1; 9 June); (yellow card) in Group C vs Australia (matchday 2; 13 June)	Group C vs Italy (matchday 3; 18 June)
(Thailand) Taneekarn Dangda	(yellow card) in Group F vs United States (matchday 1; 11 June); (yellow card) in Group F vs Sweden (matchday 2; 16 June)	Group F vs Chile (matchday 3; 20 June)
(Nigeria) Ngozi Ebere	(yellow card) (yellow-red card) in Group A vs France (matchday 3; 17 June)	Round of 16 vs Germany (22 June)
(Nigeria) Rita Chikwelu	(yellow card) in Group A vs South Korea (matchday 2; 12 June); (yellow card) in Group A vs France (matchday 3; 17 June)	Round of 16 vs Germany (22 June)
(Sweden) Fridolina Rolfö	(yellow card) in Round of 16 vs Canada (24 June); (yellow card) in Quarter-finals vs Germany (29 June)	Semi-finals vs Netherlands (3 July)
(England) Millie Bright	(yellow card) (yellow-red card) in Semi-finals vs United States (2 July)	Third place play-off vs Sweden (6 July)

== Multiple World Cups ==
Scoring at three or more World Cups

Name	(United States) 2003		(China) 2007		(Germany) 2011		(Canada) 2015		(France) 2019		Total goals
Name	Goals	Against	Goals	Against	Goals	Against	Goals	Against	Goals	Against	Total goals
(Brazil) Cristiane	0	—N/a	5	NZL, CHN (2), AUS, USA	2	EQG (2)	0	—N/a	4	JAM (3), AUS	11
(Norway) Isabell Herlovsen	—N/a		2	GHA, CHN	0	—N/a	2	THA (2)	2	KOR, AUS	6
(United States) Carli Lloyd	—N/a		0	—N/a	1	COL	6	COL, CHN, GER, JPN (3)	3	THA, CHI (2)	10
(Brazil) Marta	3	KOR, NOR, SWE	7	NZL (2), CHN (2), AUS, USA (2)	4	NOR (2), USA (2)	1	KOR	2	AUS, ITA	17
(United States) Alex Morgan	—N/a		—N/a		2	FRA, JPN	1	COL	6	THA (5), ENG	9
(United States) Megan Rapinoe	—N/a		—N/a		1	COL	2	AUS (2)	6	THA, ESP (2), FRA (2), NED	9
(Canada) Christine Sinclair	3	GER, JPN, USA	3	GHA (2), AUS	1	GER	2	CHN, ENG	1	NED	10
(England) Jill Scott	—N/a		1	ARG	2	NZL, FRA	0	—N/a	1	NOR	4

Appearing at four or more World Cups

Name	(Sweden) 1995		(United States) 1999		(United States) 2003		(China) 2007		(Germany) 2011		(Canada) 2015		(France) 2019		Total
Name	Apps	Against	Apps	Against	Apps	Against	Apps	Against	Apps	Against	Apps	Against	Apps	Against	Total
(England) Karen Carney	—N/a		—N/a		—N/a		4	JPN, GER, ARG, USA	4	MEX, NZL, JPN, FRA	6	MEX, COL, NOR, Canada, JPN, GER	4	SCO, ARG, JPN, SWE	18
(Brazil) Cristiane	—N/a		—N/a		4	KOR, NOR, FRA, SWE	6	NZL, CHN, DEN, AUS, USA, GER	4	AUS, NOR, EQG, USA	3	KOR, ESP, AUS	4	JAM, AUS, ITA, FRA	21
(Australia) Lisa De Vanna	—N/a		—N/a		—N/a		4	GHA, NOR, Canada, BRA	4	BRA, EQG, NOR, SWE	5	USA, NGA, SWE, BRA, JPN	2	ITA, JAM	15
(New Zealand) Katie Duncan	—N/a		—N/a		—N/a		1	BRA	3	JPN, ENG, MEX	3	NED, CAN, CHN	1	CMR	8
(Nigeria) Onome Ebi	—N/a		—N/a		3	PRK, USA, SWE	2	SWE, PRK	3	FRA, GER, CAN	3	SWE, AUS, USA	4	NOR, KOR, FRA, GER	15
(New Zealand) Abby Erceg	—N/a		—N/a		—N/a		3	BRA, DEN, CHN	3	JPN, ENG, MEX	3	NED, CAN, CHN	3	NED, CAN, CMR	12
(Sweden) Nilla Fischer	—N/a		—N/a		—N/a		2	USA, PRK	5	COL, PRK, USA, AUS, FRA	4	NGA, USA, AUS, GER	6	CHI, THA, CAN, GER, NED, ENG	17
(Brazil) Formiga	2	JPN, GER	6	MEX, ITA, GER, NGA, USA, NOR	3	KOR, NOR, SWE	6	NZL, CHN, DEN, AUS, USA, GER	4	AUS, NOR, EQG, USA	3	KOR, ESP, AUS	3	JAM, AUS, FRA	27
(Norway) Isabell Herlovsen	—N/a		—N/a		—N/a		3	GHA, CHN, GER	3	EQG, BRA, AUS	3	THA, GER, ENG	5	NGA, FRA, KOR, AUS, ENG	14
(Sweden) Hedvig Lindahl	—N/a		—N/a		—N/a		3	NGA, USA, PRK	6	COL, PRK, USA, AUS, JPN, FRA	4	AUS, NOR, EQG, USA	7	CHI, THA, USA, CAN, GER, NED, ENG	20
(United States) Carli Lloyd	—N/a		—N/a		—N/a		5	PRK, SWE, NGA, ENG, BRA	6	PRK, COL, SWE, BRA, FRA, JPN	7	AUS, SWE, NGA, COL, CHN, GER, JPN	7	THA, CHI, SWE, ESP, FRA, ENG, NED	25
(New Zealand) Annalie Longo	—N/a		—N/a		—N/a		1	DEN	1	JPN	3	NED, CAN, CHN	3	NED, CAN, CMR	8
(Brazil) Marta	—N/a		—N/a		4	KOR, NOR, FRA, SWE	6	NZL, CHN, DEN, AUS, USA, GER	4	AUS, NOR, EQG, USA	3	KOR, ESP, AUS	3	AUS, ITA, FRA	20
(New Zealand) Ria Percival	—N/a		—N/a		—N/a		3	BRA, DEN, CHN	3	JPN, ENG, MEX	3	NED, CAN, CHN	3	NED, CAN, CMR	12
(New Zealand) Ali Riley	—N/a		—N/a		—N/a		3	BRA, DEN, CHN	3	JPN, ENG, MEX	3	NED, CAN, CHN	3	NED, CAN, CMR	12
(England) Jill Scott	—N/a		—N/a		—N/a		4	JPN, GER, ARG, USA	4	MEX, NZL, JPN, FRA	6	FRA, MEX, NOR, CAN, JPN, GER	7	SCO, ARG, JPN, CMR, NOR, USA, SWE	21
(Canada) Sophie Schmidt	—N/a		—N/a		—N/a		3	NOR, GHA, AUS	3	GER, FRA, NGA	5	CHN, NZL, NED, SUI, ENG	4	CMR, NZL, NED, SWE	15
(Sweden) Caroline Seger	—N/a		—N/a		—N/a		3	NGA, USA, PRK	3	COL, PRK, AUS	4	NGA, USA, AUS, GER	7	CHI, THA, USA, CAN, GER, NED, ENG	17
(Canada) Christine Sinclair	—N/a		—N/a		6	GER, ARG, JPN, CHN, SWE, USA	3	NOR, GHA, AUS	3	GER, FRA, NGA	5	CHN, NZL, NED, SUI, ENG	4	CMR, NZL, NED, SWE	21

== Overall results ==
Bold numbers indicate the maximum values in each column.

=== By team ===
Team	Pld	W	D	L	Pts	APts	GF	AGF	GA	AGA	GD	AGD	CS	ACS	YC	AYC	RC	ARC
Argentina	3	0	**2**	1	2	0.67	3	1.00	4	1.33	−1	−0.33	1	0.33	3	1.00	0	0.00
Australia	4	2	1	1	7	1.75	9	2.25	6	1.50	+3	0.75	0	0.00	2	0.50	**1**	0.25
Brazil	4	2	0	2	6	1.50	7	1.75	5	1.25	+2	0.50	2	0.50	**11**	**2.75**	0	0.00
Cameroon	4	1	0	**3**	3	0.75	3	0.75	8	2.00	−5	−1.25	0	0.00	8	2.00	0	0.00
Canada	4	2	0	2	6	1.50	4	1.00	3	0.75	+1	0.25	2	0.50	3	0.75	0	0.00
Chile	3	1	0	2	3	1.00	2	0.67	5	1.67	−3	−1.00	1	0.33	5	1.67	0	0.00
China	4	1	1	2	4	1.00	1	0.25	3	0.75	−2	−0.50	2	0.50	5	1.25	0	0.00
England	**7**	5	0	2	15	2.14	13	1.86	5	0.71	+8	1.14	4	0.57	5	0.71	**1**	0.14
France	5	4	0	1	12	2.40	10	2.00	4	0.80	+6	1.20	2	0.40	5	1.00	0	0.00
Germany	5	4	0	1	12	2.40	10	2.00	2	0.40	+8	1.60	**4**	**0.80**	5	1.00	0	0.00
Italy	5	3	0	2	9	1.80	9	1.80	4	0.80	+5	1.00	2	0.40	8	1.60	0	0.00
Jamaica	3	0	0	**3**	0	0.00	1	0.33	12	4.00	−11	−3.67	0	0.00	4	1.33	0	0.00
Japan	4	1	1	2	4	1.00	3	0.75	5	1.25	−2	−0.50	1	0.25	5	1.25	0	0.00
Netherlands	**7**	6	0	1	18	2.57	11	1.57	5	0.71	+6	0.86	3	0.43	6	0.86	0	0.00
New Zealand	0	0	0	0	0	0.00	1	0.00	5	0.00	−4	0.00	0	0.00	1	0.00	0	0.00
Nigeria	4	1	0	**3**	3	0.75	2	0.50	7	1.75	−5	−1.25	1	0.25	10	2.50	**1**	0.25
Norway	5	2	1	2	7	1.40	7	1.40	7	1.40	0	0.00	1	0.20	5	1.00	0	0.00
Scotland	3	0	1	2	1	0.33	5	1.67	7	2.33	−2	−0.67	0	0.00	6	2.00	0	0.00
Spain	4	1	1	2	4	1.00	4	1.00	4	1.00	0	0.00	1	0.25	1	0.25	0	0.00
South Africa	3	0	0	**3**	0	0.00	1	0.33	8	2.67	−7	−2.33	0	0.00	8	2.67	**1**	**0.33**
South Korea	3	0	0	**3**	0	0.00	1	0.33	8	2.67	−7	−2.33	0	0.00	4	1.33	0	0.00
Sweden	**7**	5	0	2	15	2.14	12	1.71	6	0.86	+6	0.86	2	0.29	7	1.00	0	0.00
**United States**	**7**	**7**	0	0	**21**	**3.00**	**26**	**3.71**	3	0.43	**+23**	**3.29**	**4**	0.57	7	1.00	0	0.00
Thailand	3	0	0	**3**	0	0.00	1	0.33	**20**	**6.67**	−19	−6.33	0	0.00	5	1.67	0	0.00
Total	52^{(1)}	48	4^{(2)}	48	152	1.46	146	1.40	146	1.40	0	0.00	33	0.32	129	1.24	4	0.04

Team(s) rendered in italics represent(s) the host nation(s). The competition's winning team is rendered in bold.
^{(1)} – Total games lost not counted in total games played (total games lost = total games won)
^{(2)} – Total number of games drawn (tied) for all teams = Total number of games drawn (tied) ÷ 2 (both teams involved)
^{(3)} – As per statistical convention in football, matches decided in extra time are counted as wins and losses, while matches decided by penalty shoot-outs are counted as draws.

=== By confederation ===
Confederation	T	Pld	W	D	L	Pts	APts	Pts/T
AFC	5	18	4	**3**	11	15	0.83	3.00
CAF	3	10	2	1	7	7	0.70	2.33
CONCACAF	3	14	9	0	5	27	**1.93**	9.00
CONMEBOL	3	10	3	2	5	11	1.10	3.67
OFC	1	3	0	0	3	0	0.00	0.00
UEFA	**9**	**49**	**30**	2	**17**	**92**	1.88	**10.22**
Total	24	52^{(1)}	48	4^{(2)}	48	152	1.46	6.33

Host nation(s) are situated in the region(s) rendered in italics.
^{(1)} – Total games lost not counted in total games played (total games lost = total games won)
^{(2)} – Total number of games drawn (tied) for all teams = Total number of games drawn (tied) ÷ 2 (both teams involved)
^{(3)} – As per statistical convention in football, matches decided in extra time are counted as wins and losses, while matches decided by penalty shoot-outs are counted as draws.
