= 2019 FIFA Women's World Cup knockout stage =

The knockout stage of the 2019 FIFA Women's World Cup was the second and final stage of the competition, following the group stage. It began on 22 June with the round of 16 and ended on 7 July with the final match, held at the Parc Olympique Lyonnais in Décines-Charpieu. A total of 16 teams (the top two teams from each group, along with the four best third-placed teams) advanced to the knockout stage to compete in a single-elimination style tournament.

All times listed are local, CEST (UTC+2).

== Format ==
In the knockout stage, if a match was level at the end of 90 minutes of normal playing time, extra time was played (two periods of 15 minutes each), where each team was allowed to make a fourth substitution. If still tied after extra time, the match was decided by a penalty shoot-out to determine the winner.

FIFA set out the following schedule for the round of 16:

- Match 37: Runners-up Group A v Runners-up Group C
- Match 38: Winners Group B v 3rd Group A / C / D
- Match 39: Winners Group D v 3rd Group B / E / F
- Match 40: Winners Group A v 3rd Group C / D / E
- Match 41: Runners-up Group B v Winners Group F
- Match 42: Runners-up Group F v Runners-up Group E
- Match 43: Winners Group C v 3rd Group A / B / F
- Match 44: Winners Group E v Runners-up Group D

=== Combinations of matches in the round of 16 ===
In the round of 16, the four third-placed teams were matched with the winners of groups A, B, C, and D. The specific match-ups involving the third-placed teams depend on which four third-placed teams qualified for the round of 16:

Combination used according to the four qualified teams

Third-placed teams qualify from groups						1A vs	1B vs	1C vs	1D vs
A	B	C	D			3C	3D	3A	3B
A	B	C		E		3C	3A	3B	3E
A	B	C			F	3C	3A	3B	3F
A	B		D	E		3D	3A	3B	3E
A	B		D		F	3D	3A	3B	3F
A	B			E	F	3E	3A	3B	3F
A		C	D	E		3C	3D	3A	3E
A		C	D		F	3C	3D	3A	3F
A		C		E	F	3C	3A	3F	3E
A			D	E	F	3D	3A	3F	3E
	B	C	D	E		3C	3D	3B	3E
	B	C	D		F	3C	3D	3B	3F
	B	C		E	F	3E	3C	3B	3F
	B		D	E	F	3E	3D	3B	3F
		C	D	E	F	3C	3D	3F	3E

== Qualified teams ==
The top two placed teams from each of the six groups, plus the four best-placed third teams, qualified for the knockout stage.

Group	Winners	Runners-up	Third-placed teams (Best four qualified)
A	France	Norway	Nigeria
B	Germany	Spain	China
C	Italy	Australia	Brazil
D	England	Japan	—N/a
E	Netherlands	Canada	Cameroon
F	United States	Sweden	—N/a

== Bracket ==
Round of 16
22 June – Nice
Norway (p)	1 (4)
Australia	1 (1)
23 June – Valenciennes
England	3
Cameroon	0
23 June – Le Havre
France (a.e.t.)	2
Brazil	1
24 June – Reims
Spain	1
United States	2
25 June – Montpellier
Italy	2
China	0
25 June – Rennes
Netherlands	2
Japan	1
22 June – Grenoble
Germany	3
Nigeria	0
24 June – Paris
Sweden	1
Canada	0

Quarter-finals
27 June – Le Havre
Norway	0
England	3
28 June – Paris
France	1
United States	2
29 June – Valenciennes
Italy	0
Netherlands	2
29 June – Rennes
Germany	1
Sweden	2

Semi-finals
2 July – Décines-Charpieu
England	1
United States	2
3 July – Décines-Charpieu
Netherlands (a.e.t.)	1
Sweden	0

Final
7 July – Décines-Charpieu
United States	2
Netherlands	0
Third place play-off
6 July – Nice
England	1
Sweden	2

== Round of 16 ==
=== Germany vs Nigeria ===
German captain Alexandra Popp opened the scoring for her side in the 20th minute after heading in Lina Magull's corner from close range. In the 26th minute, Germany were awarded a penalty after Evelyn Nwabuoku was judged to have fouled Magull in the box after missing a clearance. Sara Däbritz converted the resulting penalty by scoring low to Chiamaka Nnadozie's left. Nigeria missed a great scoring chance early in the second half, when substitute Rasheedat Ajibade's low cross was missed by Nigerian captain Desire Oparanozie. In the 82nd minute, Germany scored their third goal when Halimatu Ayinde's misjudged back pass played in Lea Schüller, who shot low to the far post to seal the game for Germany.

22 June 2019
17:30

Germany	3–0	Nigeria
Popp 20'; Däbritz 27' (pen.); Schüller 82'	Report

Stade des Alpes, Grenoble
Attendance: 17,988
Referee: Yoshimi Yamashita (Japan)

Germany	Nigeria

GK	1	Almuth Schult
RB	15	Giulia Gwinn
CB	23	Sara Doorsoun
CB	5	Marina Hegering
LB	17	Verena Schweers		(substituted off) 46'
RM	9	Svenja Huth	(yellow card) 57'
CM	18	Melanie Leupolz		(substituted off) 46'
CM	20	Lina Magull		(substituted off) 69'
LM	13	Sara Däbritz
CF	11	Alexandra Popp (c)	(yellow card) 32'
CF	7	Lea Schüller
Substitutions:
FW	19	Klara Bühl		(substituted on) 46'
DF	2	Carolin Simon		(substituted on) 46'
MF	6	Lena Oberdorf		(substituted on) 69'
Manager:
Martina Voss-Tecklenburg

GK	16	Chiamaka Nnadozie
RB	20	Chidinma Okeke
CB	5	Onome Ebi
CB	6	Evelyn Nwabuoku	(yellow card) 26'	(substituted off) 46'
LB	3	Osinachi Ohale
RM	17	Francisca Ordega
CM	18	Halimatu Ayinde
CM	13	Ngozi Okobi-Okeoghene
LM	12	Uchenna Kanu		(substituted off) 84'
CF	19	Chinwendu Ihezuo		(substituted off) 75'
CF	9	Desire Oparanozie (c)	(yellow card) 61'
Substitutions:
FW	15	Rasheedat Ajibade	(yellow card) 82'	(substituted on) 46'
FW	11	Chinaza Uchendu		(substituted on) 75'
FW	22	Alice Ogebe		(substituted on) 84'
Manager:
(Sweden) Thomas Dennerby

Player of the Match:
Alexandra Popp (Germany)

Assistant referees:
Naomi Teshirogi (Japan)
Makoto Bozono (Japan)
Fourth official:
Casey Reibelt (Australia)
Reserve assistant referee:
Maiko Hagio (Japan)
Video assistant referee:
Carlos del Cerro Grande (Spain)
Assistant video assistant referees:
José María Sánchez Martínez (Spain)
Mayte Chávez (Mexico)

=== Norway vs Australia ===
Australia started the match quickly: Caitlin Foord's through ball found Sam Kerr at the edge of the penalty area within 30 seconds. Kerr dribbled past Maren Mjelde, but shot just wide of Ingrid Hjelmseth's goal. At the half-hour mark, Karina Sævik's curling pass played in Isabell Herlovsen, who shot past Lydia Williams to give Norway the lead. Minutes before half-time, Australia were awarded a penalty after Maria Thorisdottir was judged to have handled Kerr's cross from the right. A subsequent VAR check revealed that Thorisdottir touched the ball with her shoulder and the penalty call was reversed. Kerr would have a goal ruled out in the 60th minute after she was judged to be offside. Elise Kellond-Knight equalised for Australia in the 83rd minute after her corner kick evaded all contact and bounced into the net at the far post. Caroline Graham Hansen almost won Norway the match in stoppage time when her curling strike from the edge of the penalty area struck the inside of the post and rolled along the goal line. The first period of extra time saw Williams make two strong saves to deny Norway, as well as Alanna Kennedy receive a red card after fouling Lisa-Marie Utland.

After a relatively tame second period of extra time, the match went to a penalty shoot-out. Graham Hansen scored the first penalty for Norway, shooting low to Williams left after she dove the wrong way. Kerr went first for Australia but sent her shot high and wide of the goal. After Guro Reiten copied her method, Emily Gielnik saw her low effort saved by Hjelmseth, who dove to her right to make the stop. After both Maren Mjelde and Steph Catley scored their penalties, Ingrid Syrstad Engen slotted into the bottom right corner to send Norway into the quarter-finals.

22 June 2019
21:00

Norway	1–1 (a.e.t.)	Australia
Herlovsen 31'	Report	Kellond-Knight 83'
Penalties
Graham Hansen (penalty scored); Reiten (penalty scored); Mjelde (penalty scored); Syrstad Engen (penalty scored)	4–1	(penalty missed) Kerr; (penalty missed) Gielnik; (penalty scored) Catley

Allianz Riviera, Nice
Attendance: 12,229
Referee: Riem Hussein (Germany)

Norway	Australia

GK	1	Ingrid Hjelmseth
RB	2	Ingrid Moe Wold		(substituted off) 102'
CB	6	Maren Mjelde (c)
CB	3	Maria Thorisdottir
LB	17	Kristine Minde	(yellow card) 53'
RM	21	Karina Sævik		(substituted off) 72'
CM	8	Vilde Bøe Risa	(yellow card) 105+2'
CM	14	Ingrid Syrstad Engen
LM	16	Guro Reiten
CF	10	Caroline Graham Hansen
CF	9	Isabell Herlovsen		(substituted off) 77'
Substitutions:
MF	18	Frida Maanum		(substituted on) 72'
FW	11	Lisa-Marie Utland	(yellow card) 96'	(substituted on) 77'
MF	5	Synne Skinnes Hansen		(substituted on) 102'
Manager:
(Sweden) Martin Sjögren

GK	1	Lydia Williams
RB	21	Ellie Carpenter		(substituted off) 120+2'
CB	14	Alanna Kennedy	(red card) 104'
CB	7	Steph Catley
LB	8	Elise Kellond-Knight		(substituted off) 94'
CM	6	Chloe Logarzo
CM	10	Emily van Egmond		(substituted off) 116'
CM	13	Tameka Yallop
RF	16	Hayley Raso		(substituted off) 74'
CF	20	Sam Kerr (c)
LF	9	Caitlin Foord
Substitutions:
FW	15	Emily Gielnik		(substituted on) 74'
DF	4	Clare Polkinghorne		(substituted on) 94'
DF	5	Karly Roestbakken		(substituted on) 116'
MF	22	Amy Harrison		(substituted on) 120+2'
Manager:
Ante Milicic

Player of the Match:
Caroline Graham Hansen (Norway)

Assistant referees:
Kylie Cockburn (Scotland)
Mihaela Țepușă (Romania)
Fourth official:
Jana Adámková (Czech Republic)
Reserve assistant referee:
Mária Súkeníková (Slovakia)
Video assistant referee:
Felix Zwayer (Germany)
Assistant video assistant referees:
Sascha Stegemann (Germany)
Katrin Rafalski (Germany)

=== England vs Cameroon ===
In the 12th minute, England were awarded an indirect free kick in Cameroon's penalty area after goalkeeper Annette Ngo Ndom was judged to have picked up a back-pass from Augustine Ejangue. England captain Steph Houghton scored the free kick by shooting low into the bottom right corner. England doubled their lead in first half stoppage time when Ellen White received a pass from Lucy Bronze just inside the penalty area and sent a low left-footed shot past Ndom. Early in the second half, Ajara Nchout appeared to get a goal back for Cameroon after firing a Gabrielle Onguéné cutback into the top corner, but the goal was disallowed when a VAR check showed that Onguéné was offside in the build-up to the goal. Alexandra Takounda missed a great chance just after being brought in when she collected Alex Greenwood's weak back pass in front of goal. However, her effort was saved by Karen Bardsley. England added another goal in the 58th minute when Greenwood hit Toni Duggan's low driven corner into the net at the far post.

The fixture attracted considerable controversy. The actions of the Cameroonian players, including delaying the restart after England's second and third goals, as well as what was perceived to be deliberately rough play, prompted a FIFA investigation into their actions. Match referee Qin Liang also received significant criticism for failing to punish several Cameroonian infractions, and was seen to have lost control of the game.

23 June 2019
17:30

England	3–0	Cameroon
Houghton 14'; White 45+4'; Greenwood 58'	Report

Stade du Hainaut, Valenciennes
Attendance: 20,148
Referee: Qin Liang (China)

England	Cameroon

GK	1	Karen Bardsley
RB	2	Lucy Bronze
CB	5	Steph Houghton (c)
CB	6	Millie Bright
LB	3	Alex Greenwood
CM	4	Keira Walsh
CM	10	Fran Kirby
CM	8	Jill Scott	(substituted off) 78'
RF	7	Nikita Parris	(substituted off) 84'
CF	18	Ellen White	(substituted off) 64'
LF	11	Toni Duggan
Substitutions:
FW	9	Jodie Taylor	(substituted on) 64'
MF	23	Lucy Staniforth	(substituted on) 78'
DF	14	Leah Williamson	(substituted on) 84'
Manager:
Phil Neville

GK	1	Annette Ngo Ndom
RB	4	Yvonne Leuko	(yellow card) 4'
CB	5	Augustine Ejangue		(substituted off) 64'
CB	6	Estelle Johnson
LB	11	Aurelle Awona
DM	8	Raissa Feudjio
CM	22	Michaela Abam		(substituted off) 68'
CM	10	Jeannette Yango
RM	3	Ajara Nchout
LM	7	Gabrielle Onguéné (c)
CF	17	Gaëlle Enganamouit		(substituted off) 53'
Substitutions:
FW	21	Alexandra Takounda	(yellow card) 90+10'	(substituted on) 53'
DF	15	Ysis Sonkeng		(substituted on) 64'
MF	14	Ninon Abena		(substituted on) 68'
Manager:
Alain Djeumfa

Player of the Match:
Steph Houghton (England)

Assistant referees:
Fang Yan (China)
Hong Kum-nyo (North Korea)
Fourth official:
Ri Hyang-ok (North Korea)
Reserve assistant referee:
Kim Kyoung-min (South Korea)
Video assistant referee:
Bastian Dankert (Germany)
Assistant video assistant referees:
Mohammed Abdulla Hassan Mohamed (United Arab Emirates)
Michelle O'Neill (Republic of Ireland)

=== France vs Brazil ===
23 June 2019
21:00

France	2–1 (a.e.t.)	Brazil
Gauvin 52'; Henry 107'	Report	Thaisa 63'

Stade Océane, Le Havre
Attendance: 23,965
Referee: Marie-Soleil Beaudoin (Canada)

France	Brazil

GK	16	Sarah Bouhaddi
RB	4	Marion Torrent		(substituted off) 109'
CB	19	Griedge Mbock Bathy
CB	3	Wendie Renard	(yellow card) 36'
LB	10	Amel Majri		(substituted off) 118'
RM	11	Kadidiatou Diani
CM	6	Amandine Henry (c)
CM	15	Élise Bussaglia
LM	18	Viviane Asseyi		(substituted off) 81'
CF	13	Valérie Gauvin		(substituted off) 90+3'
CF	9	Eugénie Le Sommer
Substitutions:
MF	17	Gaëtane Thiney		(substituted on) 81'
FW	20	Delphine Cascarino		(substituted on) 90+3'
DF	2	Ève Périsset		(substituted on) 109'
DF	7	Sakina Karchaoui		(substituted on) 118'
Manager:
Corinne Diacre

GK	1	Bárbara
RB	13	Letícia Santos		(substituted off) 89'
CB	14	Kathellen	(yellow card) 101'
CB	21	Mônica
LB	6	Tamires	(yellow card) 45+2'
CM	8	Formiga	(yellow card) 70'	(substituted off) 75'
CM	5	Thaisa
CM	10	Marta (c)
RF	19	Ludmila		(substituted off) 71'
CF	11	Cristiane		(substituted off) 96'
LF	9	Debinha
Substitutions:
FW	16	Beatriz	(yellow card) 82'	(substituted on) 71'
MF	17	Andressinha		(substituted on) 75'
DF	2	Poliana		(substituted on) 89'
FW	23	Geyse		(substituted on) 96'
Manager:
Vadão

Player of the Match:
Amandine Henry (France)

Assistant referees:
Princess Brown (Jamaica)
Stephanie-Dale Yee Sing (Jamaica)
Fourth official:
Esther Staubli (Switzerland)
Reserve assistant referee:
Susanne Küng (Switzerland)
Video assistant referee:
Massimiliano Irrati (Italy)
Assistant video assistant referees:
Chris Beath (Australia)
Oleksandra Ardasheva (Ukraine)

=== Spain vs United States ===
24 June 2019
18:00

Spain	1–2	United States
Hermoso 9'	Report	Rapinoe 7' (pen.), 75' (pen.)

Stade Auguste-Delaune, Reims
Attendance: 19,633
Referee: Katalin Kulcsár (Hungary)

Spain	United States

GK	13	Sandra Paños
RB	7	Marta Corredera
CB	4	Irene Paredes (c)	(yellow card) 85'
CB	16	María Pilar León
LB	3	Leila Ouahabi
CM	6	Vicky Losada		(substituted off) 32'
CM	14	Virginia Torrecilla		(substituted off) 83'
CM	12	Patricia Guijarro
RF	17	Lucía García
CF	10	Jennifer Hermoso
LF	11	Alexia Putellas		(substituted off) 78'
Substitutions:
FW	22	Nahikari García		(substituted on) 32'
MF	21	Andrea Falcón		(substituted on) 78'
FW	9	Mariona Caldentey		(substituted on) 83'
Manager:
Jorge Vilda

GK	1	Alyssa Naeher
RB	5	Kelley O'Hara
CB	7	Abby Dahlkemper
CB	4	Becky Sauerbrunn
LB	19	Crystal Dunn
CM	16	Rose Lavelle		(substituted off) 89'
CM	8	Julie Ertz
CM	3	Sam Mewis
RF	17	Tobin Heath
CF	13	Alex Morgan		(substituted off) 85'
LF	15	Megan Rapinoe (c)	(yellow card) 37'	(substituted off) 90+7'
Substitutions:
FW	10	Carli Lloyd		(substituted on) 85'
MF	9	Lindsey Horan		(substituted on) 89'
FW	23	Christen Press		(substituted on) 90+7'
Manager:
Jill Ellis

Player of the Match:
Megan Rapinoe (United States)

Assistant referees:
Katalin Török (Hungary)
Sanja Rođak-Karšić (Croatia)
Fourth official:
Anna-Marie Keighley (New Zealand)
Reserve assistant referee:
Sarah Jones (New Zealand)
Video assistant referee:
Danny Makkelie (Netherlands)
Assistant video assistant referees:
Paweł Gil (Poland)
Lucie Ratajová (Czech Republic)

=== Sweden vs Canada ===
24 June 2019
21:00

Sweden	1–0	Canada
Blackstenius 55'	Report

Parc des Princes, Paris
Attendance: 38,078
Referee: Kate Jacewicz (Australia)

Sweden	Canada

GK	1	Hedvig Lindahl
RB	4	Hanna Glas
CB	5	Nilla Fischer
CB	3	Linda Sembrant
LB	6	Magdalena Eriksson
CM	23	Elin Rubensson		(substituted off) 79'
CM	9	Kosovare Asllani	(yellow card) 68'
CM	17	Caroline Seger (c)
RF	10	Sofia Jakobsson
CF	11	Stina Blackstenius		(substituted off) 90+4'
LF	18	Fridolina Rolfö	(yellow card) 45'	(substituted off) 89'
Substitutions:
DF	15	Nathalie Björn		(substituted on) 79'
MF	8	Lina Hurtig		(substituted on) 89'
MF	19	Anna Anvegård		(substituted on) 90+4'
Manager:
Peter Gerhardsson

GK	1	Stephanie Labbé
RB	10	Ashley Lawrence
CB	3	Kadeisha Buchanan	(yellow card) 85'
CB	4	Shelina Zadorsky
LB	2	Allysha Chapman		(substituted off) 84'
RM	15	Nichelle Prince		(substituted off) 64'
CM	11	Desiree Scott
CM	13	Sophie Schmidt
LM	16	Janine Beckie		(substituted off) 84'
CF	12	Christine Sinclair (c)
CF	17	Jessie Fleming
Substitutions:
FW	19	Adriana Leon		(substituted on) 64'
DF	8	Jayde Riviere		(substituted on) 84'
DF	5	Quinn (Note: Then known as Rebecca Quinn)		(substituted on) 84'
Manager:
(Denmark) Kenneth Heiner-Møller

Player of the Match:
Hedvig Lindahl (Sweden)

Assistant referees:
Kathryn Nesbitt (United States)
Felisha Mariscal (United States)
Fourth official:
Sandra Braz (Portugal)
Reserve assistant referee:
Lisa Rashid (England)
Video assistant referee:
José María Sánchez Martínez (Spain)
Assistant video assistant referees:
Paolo Valeri (Italy)
Manuela Nicolosi (France)

=== Italy vs China ===
25 June 2019
18:00

Italy	2–0	China
Giacinti 15'; Galli 49'	Report

Stade de la Mosson, Montpellier
Attendance: 17,492
Referee: Edina Alves Batista (Brazil)

Italy	China

GK	1	Laura Giuliani
RB	7	Alia Guagni
CB	3	Sara Gama (c)
CB	5	Elena Linari
LB	13	Elisa Bartoli
CM	2	Valentina Bergamaschi	(substituted off) 63'
CM	23	Manuela Giugliano
CM	21	Valentina Cernoia
RF	19	Valentina Giacinti
CF	10	Cristiana Girelli	(substituted off) 39'
LF	11	Barbara Bonansea	(substituted off) 71'
Substitutions:
MF	4	Aurora Galli	(substituted on) 39'
FW	18	Ilaria Mauro	(substituted on) 63'
MF	6	Martina Rosucci	(substituted on) 71'
Manager:
Milena Bertolini

GK	12	Peng Shimeng
RB	6	Han Peng
CB	5	Wu Haiyan (c)
CB	3	Lin Yuping
LB	2	Liu Shanshan
RM	11	Wang Shanshan	(substituted off) 61'
CM	20	Zhang Rui
CM	13	Wang Yan	(substituted off) 61'
LM	17	Gu Yasha	(substituted off) 46'
CF	7	Wang Shuang
CF	10	Li Ying
Substitutions:
FW	9	Yang Li	(substituted on) 46'
FW	15	Song Duan	(substituted on) 61'
MF	21	Yao Wei	(substituted on) 61'
Manager:
Jia Xiuquan

Player of the Match:
Valentina Giacinti (Italy)

Assistant referees:
Neuza Back (Brazil)
Tatiane Sacilotti (Brazil)
Fourth official:
Laura Fortunato (Argentina)
Reserve assistant referee:
Mary Blanco (Colombia)
Video assistant referee:
Mauro Vigliano (Argentina)
Assistant video assistant referees:
Tiago Martins (Portugal)
Mariana de Almeida (Argentina)

=== Netherlands vs Japan ===
25 June 2019
21:00

Netherlands	2–1	Japan
Martens 17', 90' (pen.)	Report	Hasegawa 43'

Roazhon Park, Rennes
Attendance: 21,076
Referee: Melissa Borjas (Honduras)

Netherlands	Japan

GK	1	Sari van Veenendaal (c)
RB	2	Desiree van Lunteren
CB	3	Stefanie van der Gragt
CB	20	Dominique Bloodworth
LB	4	Merel van Dongen	(substituted off) 85'
CM	14	Jackie Groenen
CM	10	Daniëlle van de Donk	(substituted off) 87'
CM	8	Sherida Spitse
RF	7	Shanice van de Sanden	(substituted off) 68'
CF	9	Vivianne Miedema
LF	11	Lieke Martens
Substitutions:
FW	21	Lineth Beerensteyn	(substituted on) 68'
DF	5	Kika van Es	(substituted on) 85'
MF	19	Jill Roord	(substituted on) 87'
Manager:
Sarina Wiegman

GK	18	Ayaka Yamashita
RB	22	Risa Shimizu
CB	4	Saki Kumagai (c)	(yellow card) 89'
CB	5	Nana Ichise
LB	3	Aya Sameshima
RM	7	Emi Nakajima		(substituted off) 72'
CM	17	Narumi Miura
CM	6	Hina Sugita
LM	14	Yui Hasegawa
CF	9	Yuika Sugasawa
CF	8	Mana Iwabuchi		(substituted off) 90+1'
Substitutions:
MF	15	Yuka Momiki		(substituted on) 72'
MF	13	Saori Takarada		(substituted on) 90+1'
Manager:
Asako Takakura

Player of the Match:
Lieke Martens (Netherlands)

Assistant referees:
Shirley Perello (Honduras)
Chantal Boudreau (Canada)
Fourth official:
Katja Koroleva (United States)
Reserve assistant referee:
Sian Massey-Ellis (England)
Video assistant referee:
Chris Beath (Australia)
Assistant video assistant referees:
Clément Turpin (France)
Kylie Cockburn (Scotland)

== Quarter-finals ==
=== Norway vs England ===
27 June 2019
21:00

Norway	0–3	England
	Report	Scott 3'; White 40'; Bronze 57'

Stade Océane, Le Havre
Attendance: 21,111
Referee: Lucila Venegas (Mexico)

Norway	England

GK	1	Ingrid Hjelmseth
RB	2	Ingrid Moe Wold		(substituted off) 85'
CB	6	Maren Mjelde (c)
CB	3	Maria Thorisdottir	(yellow card) 88'
LB	17	Kristine Minde
RM	21	Karina Sævik		(substituted off) 64'
CM	8	Vilde Bøe Risa
CM	14	Ingrid Syrstad Engen
LM	16	Guro Reiten		(substituted off) 74'
CF	10	Caroline Graham Hansen
CF	9	Isabell Herlovsen
Substitutions:
FW	11	Lisa-Marie Utland		(substituted on) 64'
FW	15	Amalie Eikeland		(substituted on) 74'
MF	5	Synne Skinnes Hansen		(substituted on) 85'
Manager:
(Sweden) Martin Sjögren

GK	1	Karen Bardsley
RB	2	Lucy Bronze
CB	5	Steph Houghton (c)
CB	6	Millie Bright
LB	12	Demi Stokes
CM	4	Keira Walsh
CM	10	Fran Kirby	(substituted off) 74'
CM	8	Jill Scott
RF	7	Nikita Parris	(substituted off) 88'
CF	18	Ellen White
LF	11	Toni Duggan	(substituted off) 54'
Substitutions:
FW	22	Beth Mead	(substituted on) 54'
MF	19	Georgia Stanway	(substituted on) 74'
DF	17	Rachel Daly	(substituted on) 88'
Manager:
Phil Neville

Player of the Match:
Lucy Bronze (England)

Assistant referees:
Mayte Chávez (Mexico)
Enedina Caudillo (Mexico)
Fourth official:
Katalin Kulcsár (Hungary)
Reserve assistant referee:
Sanja Rođak-Karšić (Croatia)
Video assistant referee:
Massimiliano Irrati (Italy)
Assistant video assistant referees:
Paolo Valeri (Italy)
Manuela Nicolosi (France)

=== France vs United States ===
28 June 2019
21:00

France	1–2	United States
Renard 81'	Report	Rapinoe 5', 65'

Parc des Princes, Paris
Attendance: 45,595
Referee: Kateryna Monzul (Ukraine)

France	United States

GK	16	Sarah Bouhaddi
RB	4	Marion Torrent
CB	19	Griedge Mbock Bathy	(yellow card) 4'
CB	3	Wendie Renard
LB	10	Amel Majri
CM	6	Amandine Henry (c)
CM	17	Gaëtane Thiney
CM	15	Élise Bussaglia	(yellow card) 90+4'
RF	11	Kadidiatou Diani
CF	13	Valérie Gauvin		(substituted off) 76'
LF	9	Eugénie Le Sommer		(substituted off) 82'
Substitutions:
FW	20	Delphine Cascarino		(substituted on) 76'
FW	18	Viviane Asseyi		(substituted on) 82'
Manager:
Corinne Diacre

GK	1	Alyssa Naeher
RB	5	Kelley O'Hara
CB	7	Abby Dahlkemper
CB	4	Becky Sauerbrunn
LB	19	Crystal Dunn
CM	16	Rose Lavelle	(substituted off) 63'
CM	8	Julie Ertz
CM	3	Sam Mewis	(substituted off) 82'
RF	17	Tobin Heath
CF	13	Alex Morgan (c)
LF	15	Megan Rapinoe	(substituted off) 87'
Substitutions:
MF	9	Lindsey Horan	(substituted on) 63'
FW	10	Carli Lloyd	(substituted on) 82'
FW	23	Christen Press	(substituted on) 87'
Manager:
Jill Ellis

Player of the Match:
Megan Rapinoe (United States)

Assistant referees:
Maryna Striletska (Ukraine)
Oleksandra Ardasheva (Ukraine)
Fourth official:
Kate Jacewicz (Australia)
Reserve assistant referee:
Kim Kyoung-min (South Korea)
Video assistant referee:
Danny Makkelie (Netherlands)
Assistant video assistant referees:
Paweł Gil (Poland)
Chantal Boudreau (Canada)

=== Italy vs Netherlands ===
29 June 2019
15:00

Italy	0–2	Netherlands
	Report	Miedema 70'; Van der Gragt 80'

Stade du Hainaut, Valenciennes
Attendance: 22,600
Referee: Claudia Umpiérrez (Uruguay)

Italy	Netherlands

GK	1	Laura Giuliani
RB	7	Alia Guagni	(yellow card) 66'
CB	3	Sara Gama (c)
CB	5	Elena Linari	(yellow card) 41'
LB	13	Elisa Bartoli		(substituted off) 46'
RM	2	Valentina Bergamaschi		(substituted off) 75'
CM	4	Aurora Galli
CM	23	Manuela Giugliano
LM	21	Valentina Cernoia	(yellow card) 73'
CF	19	Valentina Giacinti
CF	11	Barbara Bonansea		(substituted off) 55'
Substitutions:
DF	17	Lisa Boattin		(substituted on) 46'
FW	9	Daniela Sabatino	(yellow card) 79'	(substituted on) 55'
MF	15	Annamaria Serturini		(substituted on) 75'
Manager:
Milena Bertolini

GK	1	Sari van Veenendaal (c)
RB	2	Desiree van Lunteren
CB	3	Stefanie van der Gragt	(substituted off) 87'
CB	20	Dominique Bloodworth
LB	4	Merel van Dongen
CM	14	Jackie Groenen
CM	10	Daniëlle van de Donk
CM	8	Sherida Spitse
RF	7	Shanice van de Sanden	(substituted off) 56'
CF	9	Vivianne Miedema	(substituted off) 87'
LF	11	Lieke Martens
Substitutions:
FW	21	Lineth Beerensteyn	(substituted on) 56'
DF	6	Anouk Dekker	(substituted on) 87'
MF	19	Jill Roord	(substituted on) 87'
Manager:
Sarina Wiegman

Player of the Match:
Vivianne Miedema (Netherlands)

Assistant referees:
Luciana Mascaraña (Uruguay)
Mónica Amboya (Ecuador)
Fourth official:
Qin Liang (China)
Reserve assistant referee:
Fang Yan (China)
Video assistant referee:
Carlos del Cerro Grande (Spain)
Assistant video assistant referees:
Clément Turpin (France)
Mariana de Almeida (Argentina)

=== Germany vs Sweden ===
29 June 2019
18:30

Germany	1–2	Sweden
Magull 16'	Report	Jakobsson 22'; Blackstenius 48'

Roazhon Park, Rennes
Attendance: 25,301
Referee: Stéphanie Frappart (France)

Germany	Sweden

GK	1	Almuth Schult
RB	15	Giulia Gwinn
CB	23	Sara Doorsoun
CB	5	Marina Hegering
LB	2	Carolin Simon	(substituted off) 43'
CM	13	Sara Däbritz
CM	16	Linda Dallmann	(substituted off) 46'
CM	20	Lina Magull
RF	9	Svenja Huth
CF	11	Alexandra Popp (c)
LF	7	Lea Schüller	(substituted off) 69'
Substitutions:
DF	4	Leonie Maier	(substituted on) 43'
MF	10	Dzsenifer Marozsán	(substituted on) 46'
MF	6	Lena Oberdorf	(substituted on) 69'
Manager:
Martina Voss-Tecklenburg

GK	1	Hedvig Lindahl
RB	4	Hanna Glas
CB	5	Nilla Fischer		(substituted off) 66'
CB	3	Linda Sembrant
LB	6	Magdalena Eriksson
CM	23	Elin Rubensson		(substituted off) 86'
CM	9	Kosovare Asllani
CM	17	Caroline Seger (c)
RF	10	Sofia Jakobsson
CF	11	Stina Blackstenius
LF	18	Fridolina Rolfö	(yellow card) 56'	(substituted off) 90+5'
Substitutions:
DF	13	Amanda Ilestedt		(substituted on) 66'
DF	15	Nathalie Björn		(substituted on) 86'
MF	8	Lina Hurtig		(substituted on) 90+5'
Manager:
Peter Gerhardsson

Player of the Match:
Sofia Jakobsson (Sweden)

Assistant referees:
Manuela Nicolosi (France)
Michelle O'Neill (Republic of Ireland)
Fourth official:
Melissa Borjas (Honduras)
Reserve assistant referee:
Felisha Mariscal (United States)
Video assistant referee:
José María Sánchez Martínez (Spain)
Assistant video assistant referees:
Chris Beath (Australia)
Lucie Ratajová (Czech Republic)

== Semi-finals ==
=== England vs United States ===
External videos
- Full match on FIFATV on YouTube

With the win, the United States extended their winning streak at the Women's World Cup to eleven matches, breaking the ten-match record of Norway set between 1995 and 1999, having last drawn against Sweden in the 2015 group stage. The U.S. also extended their undefeated streak to sixteen World Cup matches, breaking the record of fifteen set by Germany between 2003 and 2011, last losing against Sweden in the 2011 group stage (matches decided by penalty shoot-outs are counted as draws).

2 July 2019
21:00

England	1–2	United States
White 19'	Report	Press 10'; Morgan 31'

Parc Olympique Lyonnais, Décines-Charpieu
Attendance: 53,512
Referee: Edina Alves Batista (Brazil)

England	United States

GK	13	Carly Telford
RB	2	Lucy Bronze
CB	5	Steph Houghton (c)
CB	6	Millie Bright	(yellow card) 40' (yellow-red card) 86'
LB	12	Demi Stokes
RM	4	Keira Walsh		(substituted off) 71'
CM	8	Jill Scott
CM	22	Beth Mead		(substituted off) 58'
LM	17	Rachel Daly		(substituted off) 89'
CF	7	Nikita Parris	(yellow card) 90+5'
CF	18	Ellen White
Substitutions:
FW	10	Fran Kirby		(substituted on) 58'
MF	16	Jade Moore		(substituted on) 71'
MF	19	Georgia Stanway		(substituted on) 89'
Manager:
Phil Neville

GK	1	Alyssa Naeher
RB	5	Kelley O'Hara		(substituted off) 87'
CB	7	Abby Dahlkemper
CB	4	Becky Sauerbrunn	(yellow card) 82'
LB	19	Crystal Dunn
CM	9	Lindsey Horan	(yellow card) 46'
CM	8	Julie Ertz
CM	16	Rose Lavelle		(substituted off) 65'
RF	17	Tobin Heath		(substituted off) 80'
CF	13	Alex Morgan (c)
LF	23	Christen Press
Substitutions:
MF	3	Sam Mewis		(substituted on) 65'
FW	10	Carli Lloyd		(substituted on) 80'
DF	11	Ali Krieger		(substituted on) 87'
Manager:
Jill Ellis

Player of the Match:
Alex Morgan (United States)

Assistant referees:
Neuza Back (Brazil)
Tatiane Sacilotti (Brazil)
Fourth official:
Melissa Borjas (Honduras)
Reserve assistant referee:
Shirley Perello (Honduras)
Video assistant referee:
Carlos del Cerro Grande (Spain)
Assistant video assistant referees:
Tiago Martins (Portugal)
Manuela Nicolosi (France)

=== Netherlands vs Sweden ===
3 July 2019
21:00

Netherlands	1–0 (a.e.t.)	Sweden
Groenen 99'	Report

Parc Olympique Lyonnais, Décines-Charpieu
Attendance: 48,452
Referee: Marie-Soleil Beaudoin (Canada)

Netherlands	Sweden

GK	1	Sari van Veenendaal (c)
RB	2	Desiree van Lunteren
CB	3	Stefanie van der Gragt
CB	20	Dominique Bloodworth
LB	4	Merel van Dongen
CM	14	Jackie Groenen
CM	10	Daniëlle van de Donk	(yellow card) 116'
CM	8	Sherida Spitse	(yellow card) 85'
RF	21	Lineth Beerensteyn		(substituted off) 71'
CF	9	Vivianne Miedema
LF	11	Lieke Martens		(substituted off) 46'
Substitutions:
MF	19	Jill Roord		(substituted on) 46'
FW	7	Shanice van de Sanden		(substituted on) 71'
Manager:
Sarina Wiegman

GK	1	Hedvig Lindahl
RB	4	Hanna Glas
CB	5	Nilla Fischer
CB	3	Linda Sembrant
LB	6	Magdalena Eriksson		(substituted off) 111'
CM	23	Elin Rubensson		(substituted off) 79'
CM	9	Kosovare Asllani
CM	17	Caroline Seger (c)
RF	10	Sofia Jakobsson
CF	11	Stina Blackstenius		(substituted off) 111'
LF	8	Lina Hurtig		(substituted off) 79'
Substitutions:
FW	16	Julia Zigiotti Olme	(yellow card) 94'	(substituted on) 79'
FW	7	Madelen Janogy		(substituted on) 79'
FW	20	Mimmi Larsson		(substituted on) 111'
DF	2	Jonna Andersson		(substituted on) 111'
Manager:
Peter Gerhardsson

Player of the Match:
Jackie Groenen (Netherlands)

Assistant referees:
Princess Brown (Jamaica)
Stephanie-Dale Yee Sing (Jamaica)
Fourth official:
Kateryna Monzul (Ukraine)
Reserve assistant referee:
Maryna Striletska (Ukraine)
Video assistant referee:
Massimiliano Irrati (Italy)
Assistant video assistant referees:
Mohammed Abdulla Hassan Mohamed (United Arab Emirates)
Chantal Boudreau (Canada)

== Third place play-off ==
6 July 2019
17:00

England	1–2	Sweden
Kirby 31'	Report	Asllani 11'; Jakobsson 22'

Allianz Riviera, Nice
Attendance: 20,316
Referee: Anastasia Pustovoitova (Russia)

England	Sweden

GK	13	Carly Telford
RB	2	Lucy Bronze
CB	5	Steph Houghton (c)
CB	15	Abbie McManus		(substituted off) 83'
LB	3	Alex Greenwood
CM	10	Fran Kirby
CM	8	Jill Scott
CM	16	Jade Moore	(yellow card) 90+4'
RF	7	Nikita Parris		(substituted off) 74'
CF	18	Ellen White
LF	22	Beth Mead		(substituted off) 50'
Substitutions:
FW	9	Jodie Taylor		(substituted on) 50'
MF	20	Karen Carney		(substituted on) 74'
DF	17	Rachel Daly		(substituted on) 83'
Manager:
Phil Neville

GK	1	Hedvig Lindahl	(yellow card) 85'
RB	4	Hanna Glas
CB	5	Nilla Fischer
CB	3	Linda Sembrant
LB	6	Magdalena Eriksson
CM	15	Nathalie Björn		(substituted off) 72'
CM	9	Kosovare Asllani		(substituted off) 46'
CM	17	Caroline Seger (c)
RF	10	Sofia Jakobsson
CF	11	Stina Blackstenius
LF	18	Fridolina Rolfö		(substituted off) 27'
Substitutions:
MF	8	Lina Hurtig		(substituted on) 27'
FW	16	Julia Zigiotti Olme		(substituted on) 46'
DF	13	Amanda Ilestedt		(substituted on) 72'
Manager:
Peter Gerhardsson

Player of the Match:
Sofia Jakobsson (Sweden)

Assistant referees:
Ekaterina Kurochkina (Russia)
Petruța Iugulescu (Romania)
Fourth official:
Kate Jacewicz (Australia)
Reserve assistant referee:
Chantal Boudreau (Canada)
Video assistant referee:
Felix Zwayer (Germany)
Assistant video assistant referees:
Bastian Dankert (Germany)
Kathryn Nesbitt (United States)

== Final ==
7 July 2019
17:00

United States	2–0	Netherlands
Rapinoe 61' (pen.); Lavelle 69'	Report

Parc Olympique Lyonnais, Décines-Charpieu
Attendance: 57,900
Referee: Stéphanie Frappart (France)

United States	Netherlands

GK	1	Alyssa Naeher
RB	5	Kelley O'Hara		(substituted off) 46'
CB	7	Abby Dahlkemper	(yellow card) 42'
CB	4	Becky Sauerbrunn
LB	19	Crystal Dunn
CM	3	Sam Mewis
CM	8	Julie Ertz
CM	16	Rose Lavelle
RF	17	Tobin Heath		(substituted off) 87'
CF	13	Alex Morgan
LF	15	Megan Rapinoe (c)		(substituted off) 79'
Substitutions:
DF	11	Ali Krieger		(substituted on) 46'
FW	23	Christen Press		(substituted on) 79'
FW	10	Carli Lloyd		(substituted on) 87'
Manager:
Jill Ellis

GK	1	Sari van Veenendaal (c)
RB	2	Desiree van Lunteren
CB	6	Anouk Dekker		(substituted off) 73'
CB	3	Stefanie van der Gragt	(yellow card) 60'
LB	20	Dominique Bloodworth
CM	14	Jackie Groenen
CM	10	Daniëlle van de Donk
CM	8	Sherida Spitse	(yellow card) 10'
RF	21	Lineth Beerensteyn
CF	9	Vivianne Miedema
LF	11	Lieke Martens		(substituted off) 70'
Substitutions:
MF	19	Jill Roord		(substituted on) 70'
FW	7	Shanice van de Sanden		(substituted on) 73'
Manager:
Sarina Wiegman

Player of the Match:
Megan Rapinoe (United States)

Assistant referees:
Manuela Nicolosi (France)
Michelle O'Neill (Republic of Ireland)
Fourth official:
Claudia Umpiérrez (Uruguay)
Reserve assistant referee:
Luciana Mascaraña (Uruguay)
Video assistant referee:
Carlos del Cerro Grande (Spain)
Assistant video assistant referees:
José María Sánchez Martínez (Spain)
Mariana de Almeida (Argentina)
