= Cameroon at the FIFA Women's World Cup =

The Cameroon women's national football team has represented Cameroon at the FIFA Women's World Cup on two occasions, in 2015 and 2019.

== FIFA Women's World Cup record ==
Year	Round	Position	Pld	W	D	L	GF	GA
(China) 1991	Did not qualify							
(Sweden) 1995	Withdrew from qualification							
(United States) 1999	Did not qualify							
(United States) 2003	Did not qualify							
(China) 2007	Did not qualify							
(Germany) 2011	Did not qualify							
(Canada) 2015	Round of 16	11th	4	2	0	2	9	4
(France) 2019	Round of 16	15th	4	1	0	3	3	8
(Australia) (New Zealand) 2023	Did not qualify							
(Brazil) 2027	To be determined							
(Costa Rica) (Jamaica) (Mexico) (United States) 2031	To be determined							
(United Kingdom) 2035	To be determined							
Total	2/12	11th	8	3	0	5	12	12

FIFA Women's World Cup history
Year	Round	Date	Opponent	Result	Stadium
(Canada) 2015	Group stage	8 June	Ecuador	W 6–0	BC Place, Vancouver
(Canada) 2015	Group stage	12 June	Japan	L 1–2	BC Place, Vancouver
(Canada) 2015	Group stage	16 June	Switzerland	W 2–1	Commonwealth Stadium, Edmonton
(Canada) 2015	Round of 16	20 June	China	L 0–1	Commonwealth Stadium, Edmonton
(France) 2019	Group stage	10 June	Canada	L 0–1	Stade de la Mosson, Montpellier
(France) 2019	Group stage	15 June	Netherlands	L 1–3	Stade du Hainaut, Valenciennes
(France) 2019	Group stage	20 June	New Zealand	W 2–1	Stade de la Mosson, Montpellier
(France) 2019	Round of 16	23 June	England	L 0–3	Stade du Hainaut, Valenciennes

== 2015 FIFA Women's World Cup ==
=== Group C ===
Pos	Team	Pld	W	D	L	GF	GA	GD	Pts	Qualification
1	Japan	3	3	0	0	4	1	+3	9	Advance to knockout stage
2	Cameroon	3	2	0	1	9	3	+6	6	Advance to knockout stage
3	Switzerland	3	1	0	2	11	4	+7	3	Advance to knockout stage
4	Ecuador	3	0	0	3	1	17	−16	0	

Source: FIFA
Rules for classification: Group stage tiebreakers
8 June 2015
16:00 PDT (UTC−7)

Cameroon	6–0	Ecuador
Ngono Mani 34'; Enganamouit 36', 73', 90+4' (pen.); Manie 44' (pen.); Onguéné 79' (pen.)	Report

BC Place, Vancouver
Attendance: 25,942
Referee: Katalin Kulcsár (Hungary)
12 June 2015
19:00 PDT (UTC−7)

Japan	2–1	Cameroon
Sameshima 6'; Sugasawa 17'	Report	Nchout 90'

BC Place, Vancouver
Attendance: 31,441
Referee: Pernilla Larsson (Sweden)
16 June 2015
15:00 MDT (UTC−6)

Switzerland	1–2	Cameroon
Crnogorčević 24'	Report	Onguéné 47'; Ngono Mani 62'

Commonwealth Stadium, Edmonton
Attendance: 10,177
Referee: Claudia Umpierrez (Uruguay)

=== Round of 16 ===
20 June 2015
17:30 MDT (UTC−6)

China	1–0	Cameroon
Wang Shanshan 12'	Report

Commonwealth Stadium, Edmonton
Attendance: 15,958
Referee: Bibiana Steinhaus (Germany)

== 2019 FIFA Women's World Cup ==
=== Group E ===
Pos	Team	Pld	W	D	L	GF	GA	GD	Pts	Qualification
1	Netherlands	3	3	0	0	6	2	+4	9	Advance to knockout stage
2	Canada	3	2	0	1	4	2	+2	6	Advance to knockout stage
3	Cameroon	3	1	0	2	3	5	−2	3	Advance to knockout stage
4	New Zealand	3	0	0	3	1	5	−4	0	

Source: FIFA
Rules for classification: Group stage tiebreakers
10 June 2019
21:00

Canada	1–0	Cameroon
Buchanan 45'	Report

Stade de la Mosson, Montpellier
Attendance: 10,710
Referee: Ri Hyang-ok (North Korea)
15 June 2019
15:00

Netherlands	3–1	Cameroon
Miedema 41', 85'; Bloodworth 48'	Report	Onguéné 43'

Stade du Hainaut, Valenciennes
Attendance: 22,423
Referee: Casey Reibelt (Australia)
20 June 2019
18:00

Cameroon	2–1	New Zealand
Nchout 57', 90+5'	Report	Awona 80' (o.g.)

Stade de la Mosson, Montpellier
Attendance: 8,009
Referee: Kateryna Monzul (Ukraine)

=== Round of 16 ===
23 June 2019
17:30

England	3–0	Cameroon
Houghton 14'; White 45+4'; Greenwood 58'	Report

Stade du Hainaut, Valenciennes
Attendance: 20,148
Referee: Qin Liang (China PR)

== Goalscorers ==
Player	Goals	2015	2019
Gaëlle Enganamouit	3	3	
Gabrielle Onguéné	3	2	1
Ajara Nchout	3	1	2
Madeleine Ngono Mani	2	2	
Christine Manie	1	1	
Total	12	9	3

== Head-to-head record ==
Opponent	Pld	W	D	L	GF	GA	GD	Win %
Canada	1	0	0	1	0	1	−1	0.00
China	1	0	0	1	0	1	−1	0.00
Ecuador	1	1	0	0	6	0	+6	100.00
England	1	0	0	1	0	3	−3	0.00
Japan	1	0	0	1	1	2	−1	0.00
Netherlands	1	0	0	1	1	3	−2	0.00
New Zealand	1	1	0	0	2	1	+1	100.00
Switzerland	1	1	0	0	2	1	+1	100.00
Total	8	3	0	5	12	12	+0	37.50
