= Netherlands at the FIFA Women's World Cup =

The Netherlands has qualified three times for the FIFA Women's World Cup: In 2015, in 2019, and in 2023. They reached the 2nd round in 2015 and the final in 2019.

== 1991 World Cup ==
The Netherlands failed in the quarter-finals of qualification for UEFA Women's Euro 1991, which served as the qualifying tournament for the first women's World Cup in China. In the group stage, the Netherlands came first place with three wins and a draw against Ireland and Northern Ireland. In the quarter-finals they met Denmark in a two-legged tie. After a goalless draw in Denmark they lost the home game in Denekamp 0-1 after extra time.

== 1995 World Cup ==
As in 1991, UEFA designated the UEFA Women's Euro 1995 the qualifying tournament for that year's World Cup. The Netherlands failed to qualify in the group stage of qualification. This time Iceland, against which both games were lost, and Greece, against which both games were won, were the group opponents. As second in the group, they failed to reach the quarter-finals and the World Cup.

== 1999 World Cup ==
For the third World Cup, UEFA started its own qualification process. The Netherlands in the group stage encountered world champion Norway, European champion Germany, and England. In their home games, the Netherlands won 1–0 against Germany and 2–1 against England, and reached a goalless draw against Norway, but lost all three away games and placed third ahead of England.

== 2003 World Cup ==
For the 2003 World Cup, the Netherlands faced Germany and England again in qualification, as well as Portugal for the first time. The Netherlands started with a 0–0 draw in England, but then lost four games before they won against Portugal in the final game, resulting in third place overall. Germany, who won all the matches, this time qualified directly for the World Cup, which they ended up winning.

== 2007 World Cup ==
England and France were the opponents in qualification for the 2007 World Cup, which was held for the second time in China. As other group opponents, the Netherlands faced Austria and Hungary for the first time. The Netherlands started with two 1-0 victories in France and Austria, but then lost 1–0 to England. After a 5–0 in Hungary, they also lost the next home game, this time with 0–2 against France. This was followed by three games that ended 4-0: In England with four goals for England, as well as in the two home games with four goals for the Netherlands against Austria and Hungary.

== 2011 World Cup ==
In March 2010, Roger Reijners took over as the national team coach from Vera Pauw, who had coached the Netherlands since 2004, and was fired over differences with the association's leadership. At the draw for qualification they were tied with Norway again. Other opponents were Belarus, Slovakia, and Macedonia. The Netherlands started with a 0–3 loss in Norway. They followed up with the 13–1 against Macedonia, one of their two highest international wins, and a 1–1 against Belarus. All subsequent matches were won, except for the home game against Norway, which ended in a 2–2 draw. In the end the Netherlands placed second behind Norway, which won in the play-off round of the group winners against Ukraine.

== 2015 World Cup ==
Starting positions in the first World Cup match of the Netherlands

The Netherlands qualified for the 2015 World Cup. At the qualification draw for the World Cup in Canada, they were again matched with Norway. Other group opponents were Belgium, whom they beat in the first game 4–0, Portugal, Greece, and Albania. After a 0–7 win in Portugal, they lost out on direct qualification in the home games against Norway and Belgium losing 1-2 and drawing 1-1. However, on the final day of qualifying, the Netherlands were able to secure their participation in the playoff games of the runners-up by winning in Norway. In the playoffs they qualified for the first time with two wins against Scotland and, after a 1–1 home game a 2–1 victory in Italy. Both goals were scored by 18-year-old Vivianne Miedema, who became topscorer in the UEFA qualification with 16 goals.

In the draw for the groups, the Netherlands were not placed and were assigned to Group A with hosts Canada

In the second round they were eliminated by Japan.

=== Group A ===
Pos	Team	Pld	W	D	L	GF	GA	GD	Pts	Qualification
1	Canada (H)	3	1	2	0	2	1	+1	5	Advance to knockout stage
2	China	3	1	1	1	3	3	0	4	Advance to knockout stage
3	Netherlands	3	1	1	1	2	2	0	4	Advance to knockout stage
4	New Zealand	3	0	2	1	2	3	−1	2	

Source: FIFA
(H) Hosts
6 June 2015
19:00 MDT (UTC−6)

New Zealand	0–1	Netherlands
	Report	Martens 33'

Commonwealth Stadium, Edmonton
Attendance: 53,058
Referee: Quetzalli Alvarado (Mexico)

11 June 2015
16:00 MDT (UTC−6)

China	1–0	Netherlands
Wang Lisi 90+1'	Report

Commonwealth Stadium, Edmonton
Attendance: 35,544
Referee: Yeimy Martínez (Colombia)

15 June 2015
19:30 EDT (UTC−4)

Netherlands	1–1	Canada
Van de Ven 87'	Report	Lawrence 10'

Olympic Stadium, Montreal
Attendance: 45,420
Referee: Ri Hyang-ok (North Korea)

=== Round of 16 ===
23 June 2015
19:00 PDT (UTC−7)

Japan	2–1	Netherlands
Ariyoshi 10'; Sakaguchi 78'	Report	Van de Ven 90+2'

BC Place, Vancouver
Attendance: 28,717
Referee: Lucila Venegas (Mexico)

== 2019 World Cup ==
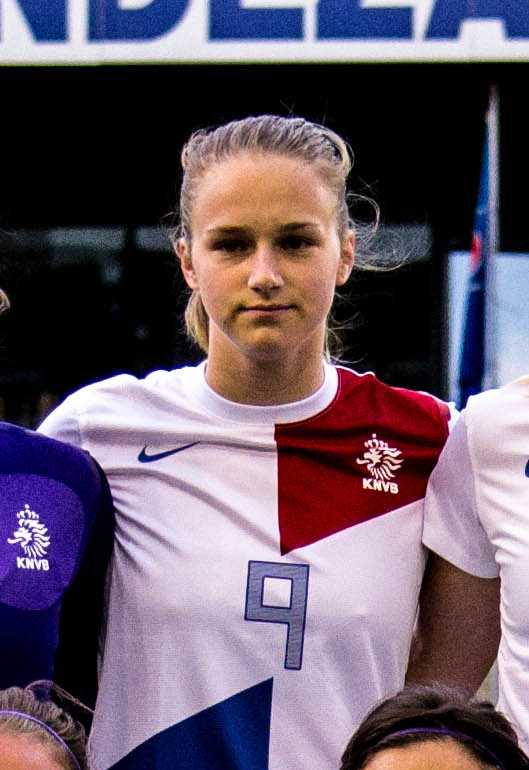
Vivianne Miedema, top scorer in World Cup qualification

Start positions in the final

In July 2017, the Netherlands won the UEFA Women's Euro's. In the World Cup qualification starting in September 2017 they were one of the group favorites, as they were Norway's supposedly strongest opponents. They won the first qualifier against Norway with 1–0, won against Slovakia with 5–0, and drew against Ireland with 0–0. Despite victories in the other games, a 1–2 defeat in Norway on the final day ensured they only finished second in the group and Norway qualified as group winners directly for the 2019 World Cup. As the best runner-up however, the Netherlands qualified for the playoffs of the four best runners-up. In the semi-final against Denmark, the Netherlands were victorious with two wins (2-0 and 2–1). In the playoff final, they met Switzerland. In the first leg, they won with 3–0. In the second leg, Anouk Dekker was sent off with a red card, and the result was a draw, making the Netherlands qualify for the second time for a World Cup.

In France, like in 2015, the Netherlands met Canada and New Zealand in the group stage as well as Cameroon. With three wins, the Netherlands qualified for the knockout stages. Again like in 2015, Japan was the opponent in the first knock-out round. With two goals from Lieke Martens, the Netherlands reached the quarter-final against Italy. The Netherlands won 2–0, with Miedema scoring her third World Cup goal. With this, the Netherlands also qualified for the Olympic Games 2020 for the first time. In the semi-final, after 90 goalless minutes, Jackie Groenen scored the only goal of the match in extra time. The Netherlands reached the final, where they lost to defending champions United States with 0–2.

=== Group E ===
Pos	Team	Pld	W	D	L	GF	GA	GD	Pts	Qualification
1	Netherlands	3	3	0	0	6	2	+4	9	Advance to knockout stage
2	Canada	3	2	0	1	4	2	+2	6	Advance to knockout stage
3	Cameroon	3	1	0	2	3	5	−2	3	Advance to knockout stage
4	New Zealand	3	0	0	3	1	5	−4	0	

Source: FIFA
11 June 2019
15:00

New Zealand	0–1	Netherlands
	Report	Roord 90+2'

Stade Océane, Le Havre
Attendance: 10,654
Referee: Edina Alves Batista (Brazil)

15 June 2019
15:00

Netherlands	3–1	Cameroon
Miedema 41', 85'; Bloodworth 48'	Report	Onguéné 43'

Stade du Hainaut, Valenciennes
Attendance: 22,423
Referee: Casey Reibelt (Australia)

20 June 2019
18:00

Netherlands	2–1	Canada
Dekker 54'; Beerensteyn 75'	Report	Sinclair 60'

Stade Auguste-Delaune, Reims
Attendance: 19,277
Referee: Stéphanie Frappart (France)

=== Round of 16 ===
25 June 2019
21:00

Netherlands	2–1	Japan
Martens 17', 90' (pen.)	Report	Hasegawa 43'

Roazhon Park, Rennes
Attendance: 21,076
Referee: Melissa Borjas (Honduras)

=== Quarter-finals ===
29 June 2019
15:00

Italy	0–2	Netherlands
	Report	Miedema 70'; Van der Gragt 80'

Stade du Hainaut, Valenciennes
Attendance: 22,600
Referee: Claudia Umpiérrez (Uruguay)

=== Semi-finals ===
3 July 2019
21:00

Netherlands	1–0 (a.e.t.)	Sweden
Groenen 99'	Report

Parc Olympique Lyonnais, Décines-Charpieu
Attendance: 48,452
Referee: Marie-Soleil Beaudoin (Canada)

=== Final ===
7 July 2019
17:00

United States	2–0	Netherlands
Rapinoe 61' (pen.); Lavelle 69'	Report

Parc Olympique Lyonnais, Décines-Charpieu
Attendance: 57,900
Referee: Stéphanie Frappart (France)

== 2023 World Cup ==
=== Group E ===
Pos	Team	Pld	W	D	L	GF	GA	GD	Pts	Qualification
1	Netherlands	3	2	1	0	9	1	+8	7	Advance to knockout stage
2	United States	3	1	2	0	4	1	+3	5	Advance to knockout stage
3	Portugal	3	1	1	1	2	1	+1	4	
4	Vietnam	3	0	0	3	0	12	−12	0	

Source: FIFA
Rules for classification: Group stage tiebreakers
23 July 2023
19:30 UTC+12

Netherlands	1–0	Portugal
Van der Gragt 13'	Report

Forsyth Barr Stadium, Dunedin
Attendance: 11,991
Referee: Kateryna Monzul (Ukraine)

27 July 2023
13:00 UTC+12

United States	1–1	Netherlands
Horan 62'	Report	Roord 17'

Wellington Regional Stadium, Wellington
Attendance: 27,312
Referee: Yoshimi Yamashita (Japan)

1 August 2023
19:00 UTC+12

Vietnam	0–7	Netherlands
	Report	Martens 8'; Snoeijs 11'; Brugts 18', 57'; Roord 23', 83'; Van de Donk 45'

Forsyth Barr Stadium, Dunedin
Attendance: 8,215
Referee: Ivana Martinčić (Croatia)

=== Round of 16 ===
6 August 2023
12:00 UTC+10

Netherlands	2–0	South Africa
Roord 9'; Beerensteyn 68'	Report

Sydney Football Stadium, Sydney
Attendance: 40,233
Referee: Yoshimi Yamashita (Japan)

=== Quarter-finals ===
11 August 2023
13:00 UTC+12

Spain	2–1 (a.e.t.)	Netherlands
Caldentey 81' (pen.); Paralluelo 111'	Report	Van der Gragt 90+1'

Wellington Regional Stadium, Wellington
Attendance: 32,021
Referee: Stéphanie Frappart (France)

== FIFA World Cup record ==
Netherlands's FIFA World Cup record
Host nation and year	Result	Pos	Pld	W	D*	L	GF	GA
(China) 1991	Did not qualify							
(Sweden) 1995	Did not qualify							
(United States) 1999	Did not qualify							
(United States) 2003	Did not qualify							
(China) 2007	Did not qualify							
(Germany) 2011	Did not qualify							
(Canada) 2015	Round of 16	13th	4	1	1	2	3	4
(France) 2019	Runners-up	2nd	7	6	0	1	11	5
(Australia) (New Zealand) 2023	Quarter-finals	7th	5	3	1	1	12	3
(Brazil) 2027	To be determined							
(Costa Rica) (Jamaica) (Mexico) (United States) 2031	To be determined							
(United Kingdom) 2035	To be determined							
Total	3/12	2nd	16	10	2	4	26	12

* Draws include knockout matches decided on penalty kicks.

FIFA Women's World Cup history
Year	Round	Date	Opponent	Result	Stadium
(Canada) 2015	Group stage	6 June	New Zealand	W 1–0	Commonwealth Stadium, Edmonton
(Canada) 2015	Group stage	11 June	China	L 0–1	Commonwealth Stadium, Edmonton
(Canada) 2015	Group stage	15 June	Canada	D 1–1	Olympic Stadium, Montreal
(Canada) 2015	Round of 16	23 June	Japan	L 1–2	BC Place, Vancouver
(France) 2019	Group stage	11 June	New Zealand	W 1–0	Stade Océane, Le Havre
(France) 2019	Group stage	15 June	Cameroon	W 3–1	Stade du Hainaut, Valenciennes
(France) 2019	Group stage	20 June	Canada	W 2–1	Stade Auguste-Delaune, Reims
(France) 2019	Round of 16	25 June	Japan	W 2–1	Roazhon Park, Rennes
(France) 2019	Quarter-finals	29 June	Italy	W 2–0	Stade du Hainaut, Valenciennes
(France) 2019	Semi-finals	3 July	Sweden	W 1–0 (a.e.t.)	Parc Olympique Lyonnais, Décines-Charpieu
(France) 2019	Final	7 July	United States	L 0–2	Parc Olympique Lyonnais, Décines-Charpieu
(Australia) (New Zealand) 2023	Group stage	23 July	Portugal	W 1–0	Forsyth Barr Stadium, Dunedin
(Australia) (New Zealand) 2023	Group stage	27 July	United States	D 1–1	Wellington Regional Stadium, Wellington
(Australia) (New Zealand) 2023	Group stage	1 August	Vietnam	W 7–0	Forsyth Barr Stadium, Dunedin
(Australia) (New Zealand) 2023	Round of 16	6 August	South Africa	W 2–0	Sydney Football Stadium, Sydney
(Australia) (New Zealand) 2023	Round of 16	6 August	Spain	L 1–2 (a.e.t.)	Wellington Regional Stadium, Wellington

== Head-to-head record ==
Opponent	Pld	W	D	L	GF	GA	GD	Win %
Cameroon	1	1	0	0	3	1	+2	100.00
Canada	2	1	1	0	3	2	+1	50.00
China	1	0	0	1	0	1	−1	0.00
Italy	1	1	0	0	2	0	+2	100.00
Japan	2	1	0	1	3	3	+0	50.00
New Zealand	2	2	0	0	2	0	+2	100.00
Portugal	1	1	0	0	1	0	+1	100.00
South Africa	1	1	0	0	2	0	+2	100.00
Spain	1	0	0	1	1	2	−1	0.00
Sweden	1	1	0	0	1	0	+1	100.00
United States	2	0	1	1	1	3	−2	0.00
Vietnam	1	1	0	0	7	0	+7	100.00
Total	16	10	2	4	26	12	+14	62.50

== Goalscorers ==
Player	Goals	2015	2019	2023
Jill Roord	5		1	4
Lieke Martens	4	1	2	1
Vivianne Miedema	3		3	
Stefanie van der Gragt	3		1	2
Esmee Brugts	2			2
Kirsten van de Ven	2	2		
Lineth Beerensteyn	2		1	1
Dominique Bloodworth	1		1	
Jackie Groenen	1		1	
Anouk Dekker	1		1	
Katja Snoeijs	1			1
Daniëlle van de Donk	1			1
Total	26	3	11	12

== See also ==
- Netherlands at the UEFA Women's Championship
