= Augustine Ejangue =

Cameroonian footballer (born 1989)

Personal information
- Full name: Augustine Silvia Ejangue Siliki
- Date of birth: 19 January 1989 (age 37)
- Place of birth: Douala, Cameroon
- Height: 1.58 m (5 ft 2 in)
- Position: Defender

Youth career
- Sawa United

Senior career*
Years	Team	Apps	(Gls)
- Franck Rollycek
- Águilas Verdes
- Etarek United
2011–2012	Energiya Voronezh	19	(0)
2012–2013	WFC Rossiyanka	9	(0)
2014	Tyresö FF	0	(0)
2014	Amazon Grimstad	8	(0)
2015–2017	Fortuna Hjørring		
2017–2018	Santa Teresa CD	19	(0)
2018–2019	Amazone FAP		
2019	Arna-Bjørnar	16	(0)
2020–2021	FC Ebolowa		
2021–2022	Pomigliano	7	(0)
2022–2023	Fatih Karagümrük	9	(1)

International career^{‡}
	Cameroon	58	(0)
- * Club domestic league appearances and goals as of 29 January 2023 ‡ National team caps and goals as of 16:31, 23 June 2015 (UTC)

Augustine Silvia Ejangue Siliki (born 19 January 1989) is a Cameroonian footballer, who plays as a defender for and the Cameroon women's national team.

== Club career ==
She played for Energiya Voronezh and WFC Rossiyanka of the Russian Top League, Arna-Bjørnar of the Norwegian Toppserien and also Danish Elitedivisionen club Fortuna Hjørring.

A Russian-speaking agent secured Ejangue and compatriot Ajara Nchout a lucrative transfer to Energiya Voronezh in 2011. But her time in Russia was interrupted by illness when she contracted malaria while back in Cameroon on national team duty.

Ejangue had signed for Swedish club Tyresö FF when they suffered a financial implosion and withdrew from the 2014 Damallsvenskan season, expunging all their results and making all their players free agents. She moved on to finish the season with Amazon Grimstad of the Norwegian Toppserien. In February 2015 Ejangue agreed a two-year contract with another Scandinavian club, Fortuna Hjørring. In summer 2017 she moved to Spain and signed for Santa Teresa CD.

In November 2020, Ejangue debuted for FC Ebolowa in the Cameroonian Women's Championship. In August 2021 she returned to Europe, signing a one-year contract with newly-promoted Italian Serie A club Pomigliano.

End October 2022, she moved to Turkey, and signed with the Istanbul-based club Fatih Karagümrük to play in the Women's Super League.

== International career ==
She is a member of the Cameroonian national team, who she represented at the 2012 Summer Olympics and the 2015 and 2019 editions of the FIFA Women's World Cup.

At the 2019 FIFA Women's World Cup, Cameroon faced England in the last sixteen stage. Ejangue's back-pass to her goalkeeper conceded the indirect free kick from which England took the lead. She spat on Toni Duggan in the immediate aftermath, one of several controversies during Cameroon's 0–3 defeat.
