= 2003 Cameroonian Premier League =

Cameroonian Premier League
- Champions: Cotonsport Garoua

In the 2003 Cameroonian Premier League season, 16 teams competed. Cotonsport Garoua won the championship.

== League standings ==
Pos	Team	Pld	W	D	L	GF	GA	GD	Pts
1	Cotonsport Garoua (C)	30	18	8	4	46	19	+27	62
2	Canon Yaoundé	30	15	6	9	40	25	+15	51
3	PWD Bamenda	30	14	9	7	21	15	+6	51
4	Bamboutos	30	14	8	8	31	19	+12	50
5	Mount Cameroon	30	14	7	9	27	22	+5	49
6	Unisport Bafang	30	12	9	9	28	28	0	45
7	Fovu Baham	30	12	7	11	32	30	+2	43
8	Union Douala	30	11	9	10	40	32	+8	42
9	Victoria United	30	9	11	10	27	25	+2	38
10	Cintra Yaoundé	30	10	7	13	23	37	−14	37
11	Tonnerre Yaoundé	30	8	11	11	27	35	−8	35
12	Renaissance Ngoumou	30	8	10	12	28	34	−6	34
13	Racing Bafoussam	30	6	15	9	26	26	0	33
14	Sable	30	7	11	12	24	31	−7	32
15	Caïman Douala (R)	30	8	4	18	31	48	−17	28
16	Stade Bandjoun (R)	30	4	8	18	13	38	−25	20

Source: rsssf.com
(C) Champions; (R) Relegated
