= Alain Djeumfa =

Cameroonian football manager (born 1972)

Personal information
- Full name: Alain Djeumfa Defrasne
- Date of birth: 30 July 1972 (age 54)
- Place of birth: Bangou, Cameroon
- Height: 1.75 m (5 ft 9 in)

Managerial career
- Years: Team
- 2003–2004: PWD Bamenda
- 2005–2006: Aigle Royal Menoua
- Fovu Club
- Botafogo FC
- Canon Yaoundé
- New Star de Douala
- 2019–2022: Cameroon Women

Alain Djeumfa Defrasne (born 30 July 1972) is a Cameroonian football manager, most recently the head coach of the Cameroon women's national team.

== Career ==
Djeumfa earned his UEFA coaching license in Hennef, Germany, and began his managerial career at PWD Bamenda. He helped the team to finish second in the 2003 Cameroonian Premier League and qualify for the 2004 CAF Confederation Cup. At Aigle Royal Menoua, he helped the team finish second in 2005 and qualify for the 2006 CAF Champions League. He has also been the coach at Fovu Club, Botafogo FC, Canon Yaoundé and New Star de Douala.

Later, Djeumfa began to work as the fitness coach for the Cameroon women's national team. On 26 January 2019, he was appointed as the team's head coach heading into the 2019 FIFA Women's World Cup in France, replacing Joseph Ndoko.
