= Annette Ngo Ndom =

Cameroonian footballer

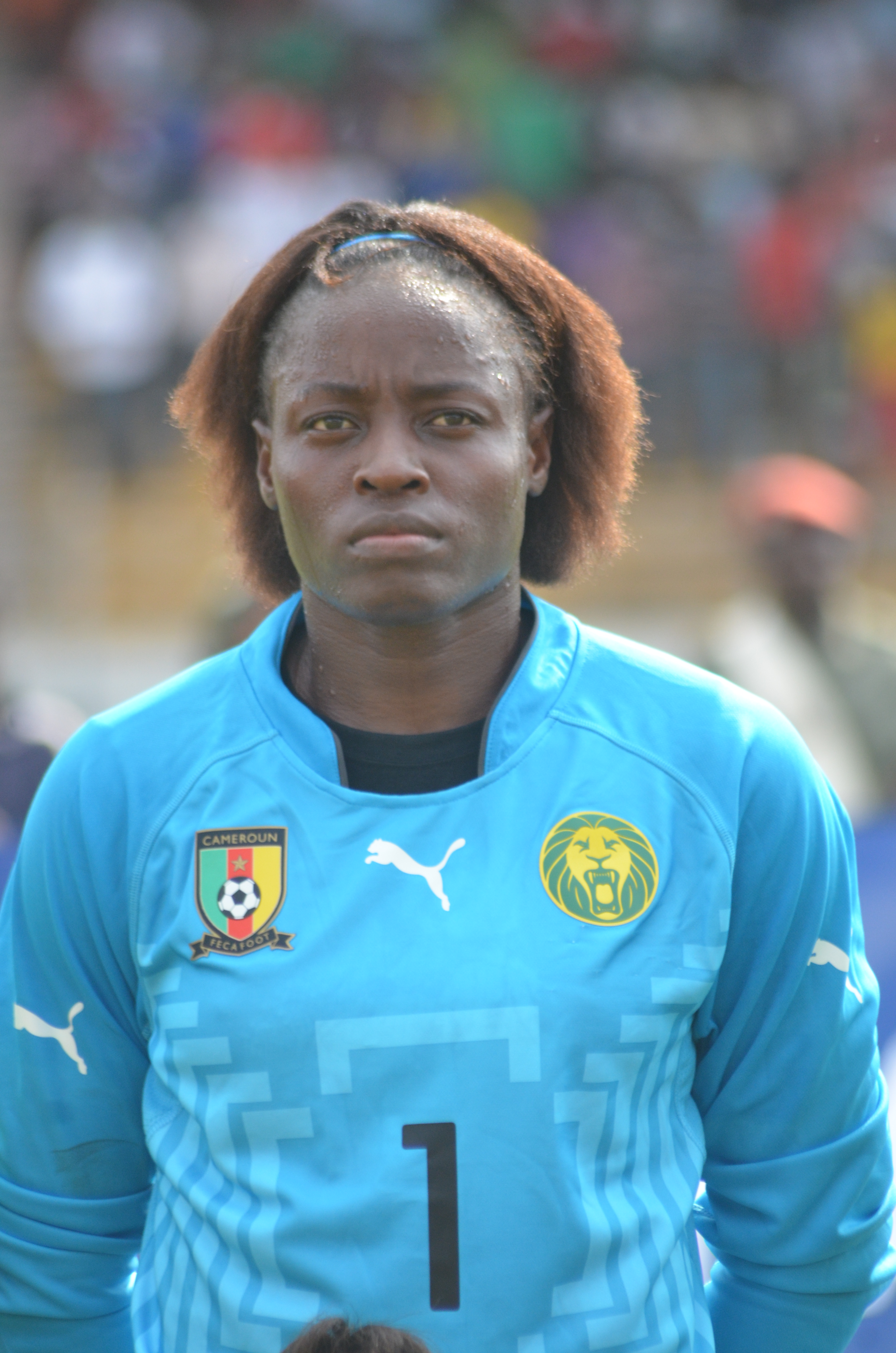

Personal information
- Full name: Annette Flore Ngo Ndom
- Date of birth: June 2, 1985 (age 41)
- Place of birth: Ndom, Cameroon
- Height: 1.71 m (5 ft 7 1/2 in)
- Position: Goalkeeper

Team information
- Current team: Amazones
- Number: 1

Senior career*
Years	Team	Apps	(Gls)
2013–2018	FK Union Nové Zámky		
2018-	Amazones		

International career^{‡}
2012–	Cameroon	44	(0)
- * Club domestic league appearances and goals as of 15:29, 12 April 2015 (UTC) ‡ National team caps and goals as of 16:21, 23 June 2015 (UTC)

Annette Flore Ngo Ndom (born 2 June 1985) is a Cameroonian football goalkeeper who currently plays for Amazones.

== Career ==
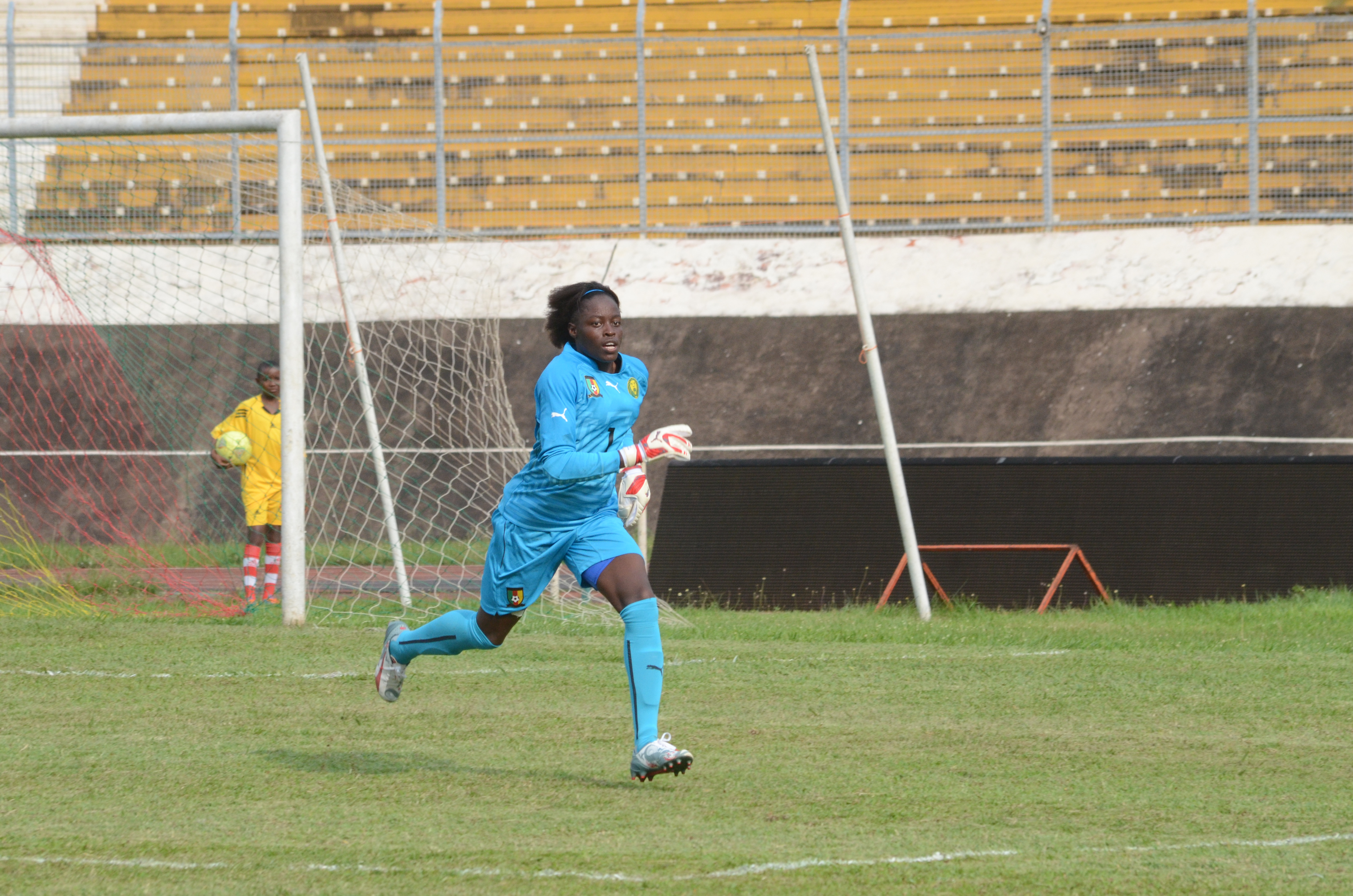
Ndom playing for Cameroon in 2015

She played for the Cameroon women's national football team at the 2012 London Olympics, her country's first appearance at a major tournament. A report in the Metro newspaper said Ngo Ndom displayed "an aversion to footballs" and was "flapping like a chicken in a disco" during 5–0 and 3–0 defeats by Brazil and Great Britain.

She enjoyed more success at club level, saving four penalties and converting one herself in Nové Zámky's 2014 Slovak Women's Cup final win over rivals Slovan Bratislava.

== Honours ==
Nové Zámky

- Slovak Women's First League: 2013–14
- Slovak Women's Cup: 2014

Individual

- IFFHS Women's CAF Team of the Decade: 2011–2020
- IFFHS All-time Africa Women's Dream Team: 2021
