= Alexandra Takounda =

Cameroonian footballer (born 2000)

Personal information
- Full name: Alexandra Takounda Engolo
- Date of birth: 7 July 2000 (age 26)
- Place of birth: Cameroon
- Height: 1.72 m (5 ft 7 1/2 in)
- Position: Forward

Senior career*
Years	Team	Apps	(Gls)
- Éclair
2021	Djurgården	16	(0)
2022-2023	Hamburger SV	2	(1)
2023–2025	Beylerbeyi	13	(6)
2025	Fatih Vatan	7	(1)
2025–2026	Giresun Sanayispor	5	(0)

International career^{‡}
2016	Cameroon U17	2	(1)
2019–	Cameroon	3	(0)
- * Club domestic league appearances and goals ‡ National team caps and goals as of 02:55, 28 June 2019 (UTC)

Alexandra Takounda Engolo (born 7 July 2000), known as Alexandra Takounda, is a Cameroonian football forward who have plays for the Cameroon women's national team.

Takounda joined Djurgårdens IF for the 2021 season. She left after one season.

== International career ==
Takounda represented Cameroon at the 2016 FIFA U-17 Women's World Cup and FIFA World Cup France 2019 where she played her first game in a 2:0 win over New Zealand.
