= Yvonne Leuko =

Cameroonian footballer

Personal information
- Full name: Yvonne Patrice Leuko Chibosso
- Date of birth: 20 November 1991 (age 34)
- Place of birth: Kékem, Cameroon
- Height: 1.63 m (5 ft 4 in)
- Position: Defender

Senior career*
Years	Team	Apps	(Gls)
2009–2010	Montigny	21	(0)
2010–2011	COM Bagneux	19	(0)
2011–2012	Montigny	19	(2)
2012–2017	Arras FCF	75	(6)
2017–2018	ASPTT Albi	16	(1)
2018–2019	Strasbourg	18	(0)
2019-2020	Nantes	5	(0)
2020-2022	Strasbourg	22	(0)
2022-2023	Racing FC Union		

International career^{‡}
2012–2019	Cameroon	26	(0)
- * Club domestic league appearances and goals as of 16:42, 8 June 2015 (UTC) ‡ National team caps and goals as of 16:29, 23 June 2015 (UTC)

Yvonne Patrice Leuko Chibosso (born 20 November 1991), known as Yvonne Leuko, is a Cameroonian footballer who plays as a defender.

She appeared for Cameroon at the 2012 Summer Olympics, 2015 World Cup, and the 2019 World Cup.
