= Qin Liang =

Chinese football referee

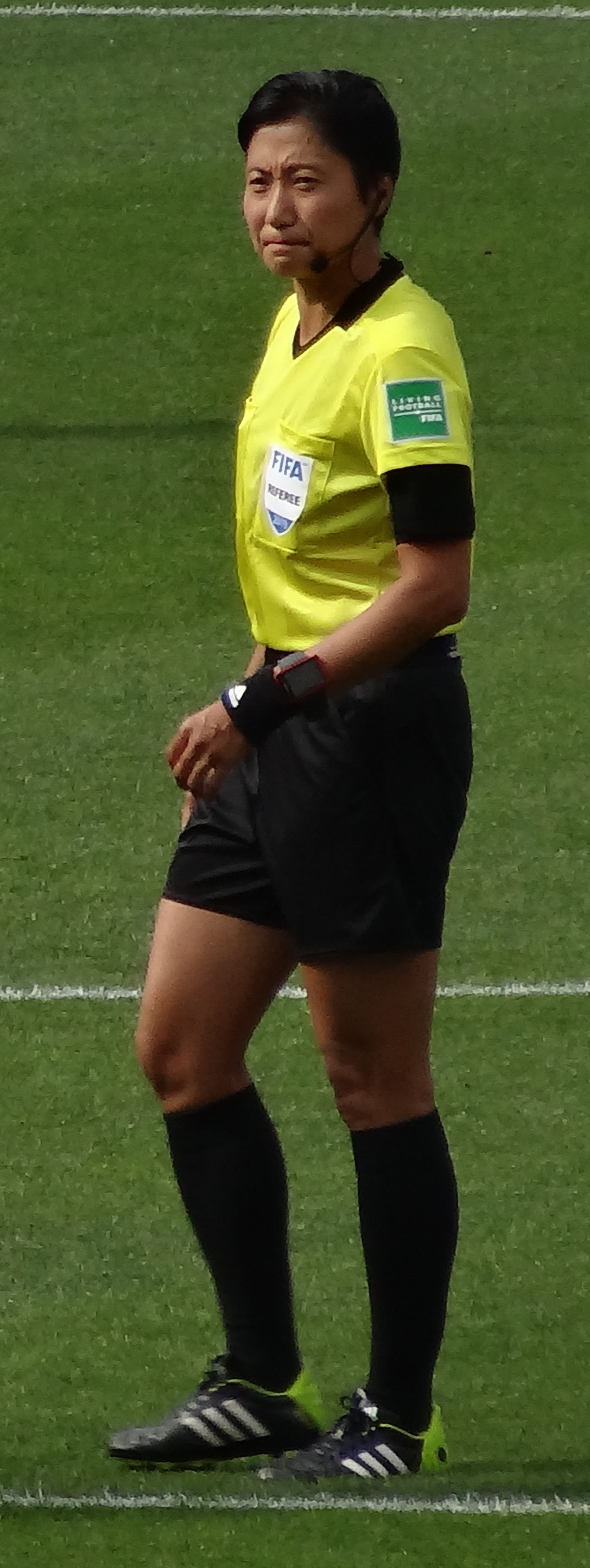
- Full name: Qin Liang
- Born: 29 March 1979 (age 47); Dunhuang, Gansu, China

International
Years	League	Role
2010–	FIFA listed	Referee

Qin Liang (Chinese: 秦亮; pinyin: Qín Liàng; born 29 March 1979) is an international football referee from China. She has been officiating international since 2011.

In December 2018, Liang was appointed to be a referee at the 2019 FIFA Women's World Cup in France.
