= Raissa Feudjio =

Cameroonian footballer (born 1995)

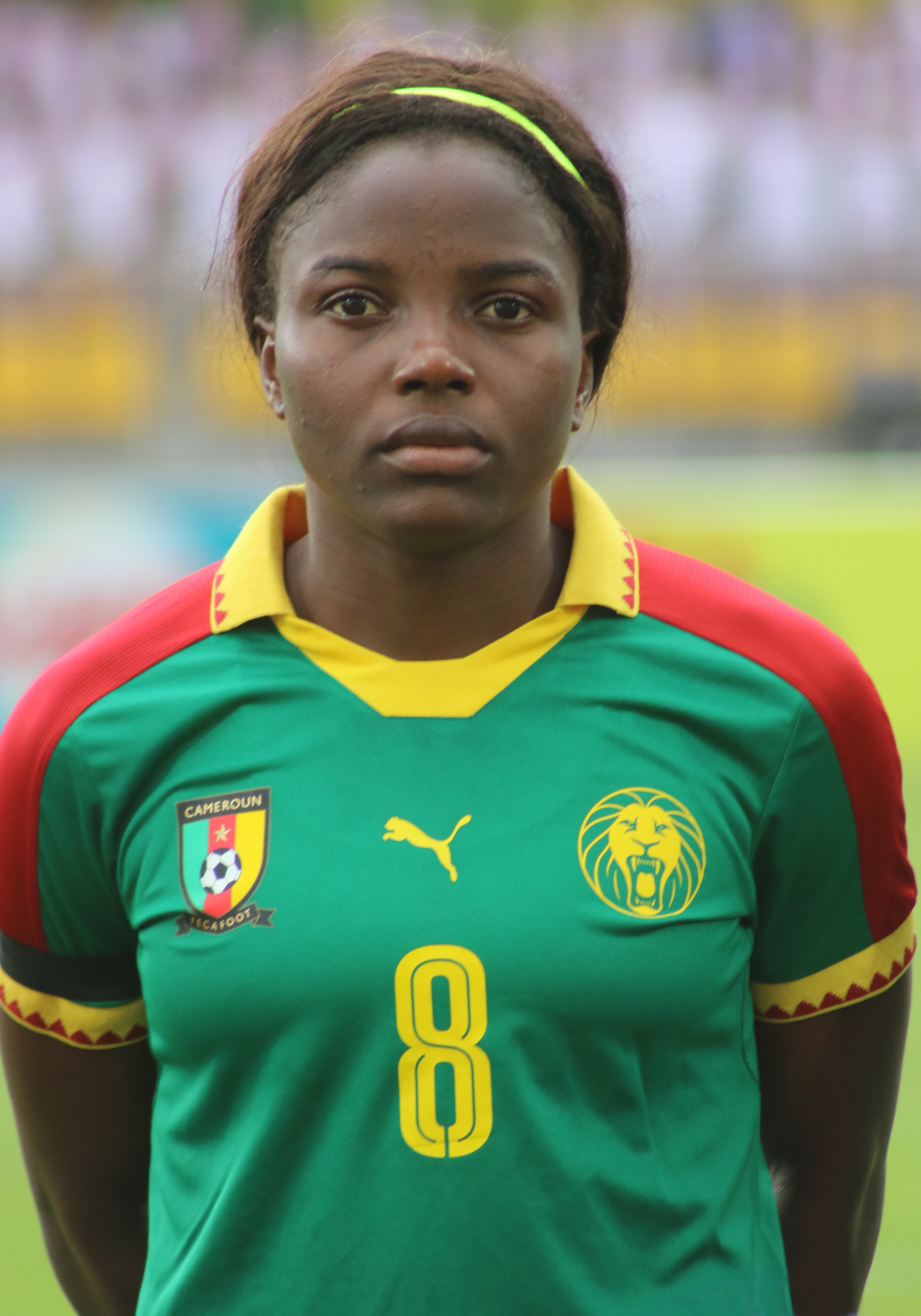
- Feudjio representing Cameroon

Personal information
- Full name: Raissa Feudjio Tchuanyo
- Date of birth: 29 October 1995 (age 31)
- Place of birth: Yaoundé, Cameroon
- Height: 1.63 m (5 ft 4 in)
- Position: Midfielder

Senior career*
Years	Team	Apps	(Gls)
2013–2014	Trabzon İdmanocağı	5	(2)
2015	Merilappi United	18	(3)
2016–2017	Åland United	37	(6)
2019–2023	UDG Tenerife	43	(0)
2023-2024	Dux Logroño	4	(0)

International career^{‡}
	Cameroon	44	(1)
- * Club domestic league appearances and goals as of 10 June 2019 ‡ National team caps and goals as of 16:39, 23 June 2015 (UTC)

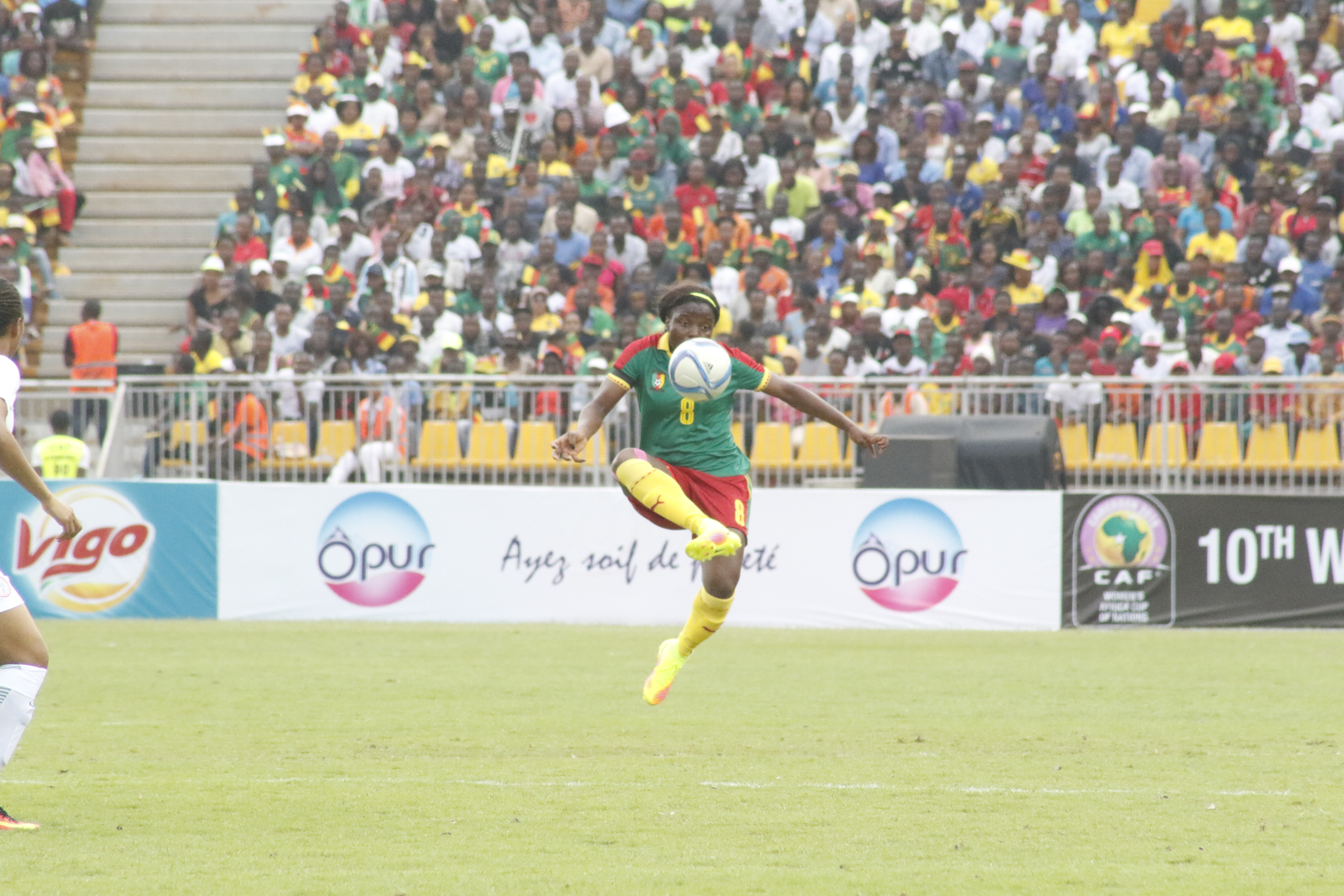
Feudjio playing for Cameroon against Nigeria

Raissa Feudjio Tchuanyo (born 29 October 1995) is a Cameroonian professional footballer who plays as a midfielder for the Cameroon women's national team. She has previously played for Trabzon İdmanocağı in the Turkish Women's First Football League and for Merilappi United and Åland United in the Finnish Naisten Liiga. She represented Cameroon at the 2012 Summer Olympics.
