= Aurelle Awona =

Cameroonian footballer (born 1993)

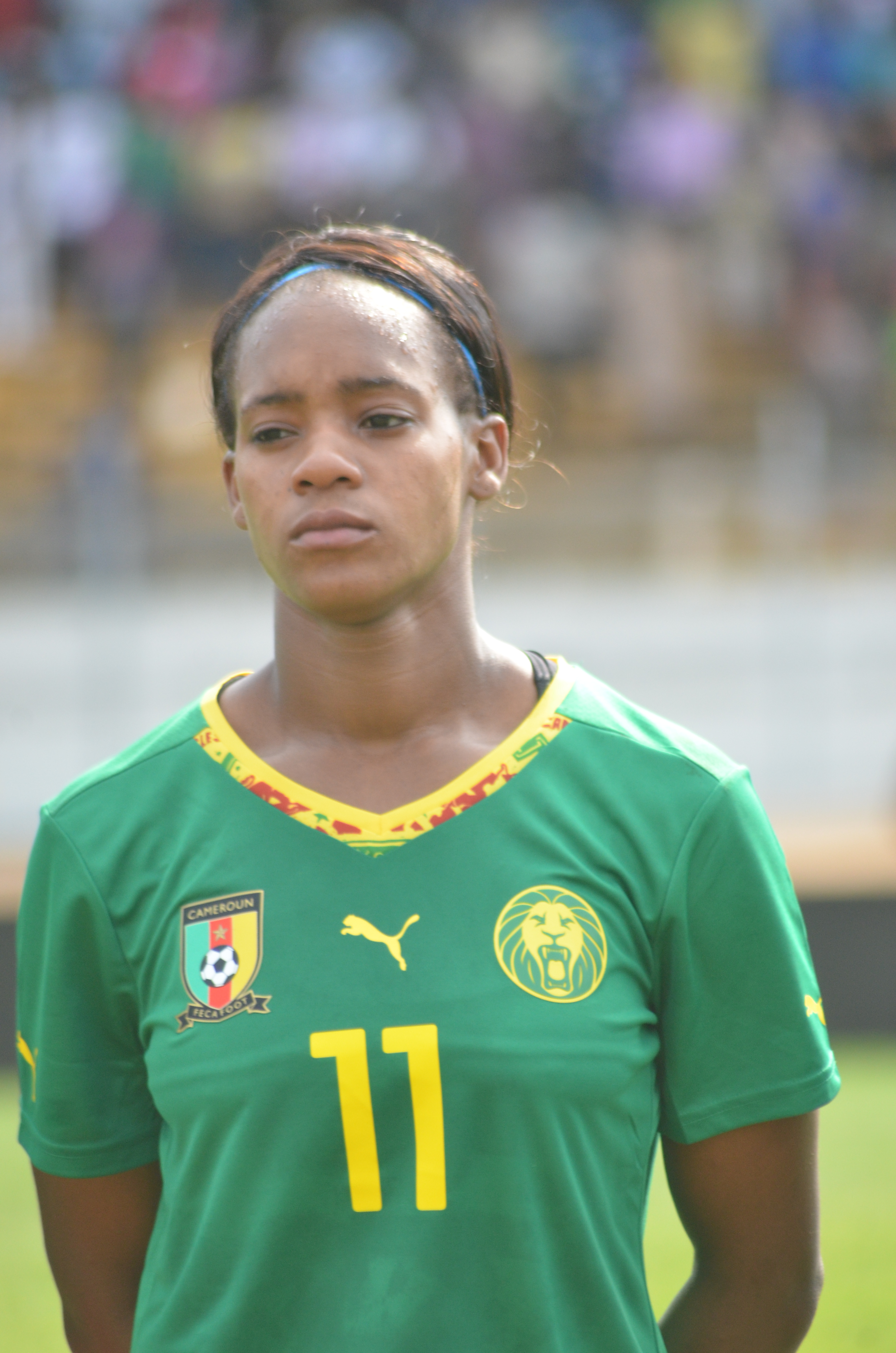

Personal information
- Full name: Marie Aurelle Awona
- Date of birth: 2 February 1993 (age 33)
- Place of birth: Yaoundé, Cameroon
- Height: 1.71 m (5 ft 7 in)
- Position: Defender

Youth career
- 2007–2009: FC Domont

Senior career*
Years	Team	Apps	(Gls)
2007–2008	FC Domont	14	(2)
2009–2011	Le Mans	26	(2)
2009–2010	Le Mans B	11	(2)
2011–2018	ASJ Soyaux	109	(1)
2018–2020	Dijon	23	(0)
2020	Madrid CFF	3	(0)
2020–2021	Reims	12	(0)
2021–2022	Napoli	13	(0)
2022	Braga	16	(1)
2023–2024	MyNavi Sendai	0	(0)

International career^{‡}
2009	France U16	2	(1)
2011–2012	France U19	3	(0)
2015–	Cameroon	11	(0)
- * Club domestic league appearances and goals as of July 2023 ‡ National team caps and goals as of 16:49, 23 June 2015 (UTC)

Marie Aurelle Awona (born 2 February 1993) is a Cameroonian professional footballer who plays as a defender. She previously played for Stade de Reims in the French Division 1 Féminine and plays at international level for the Cameroon women's national team.

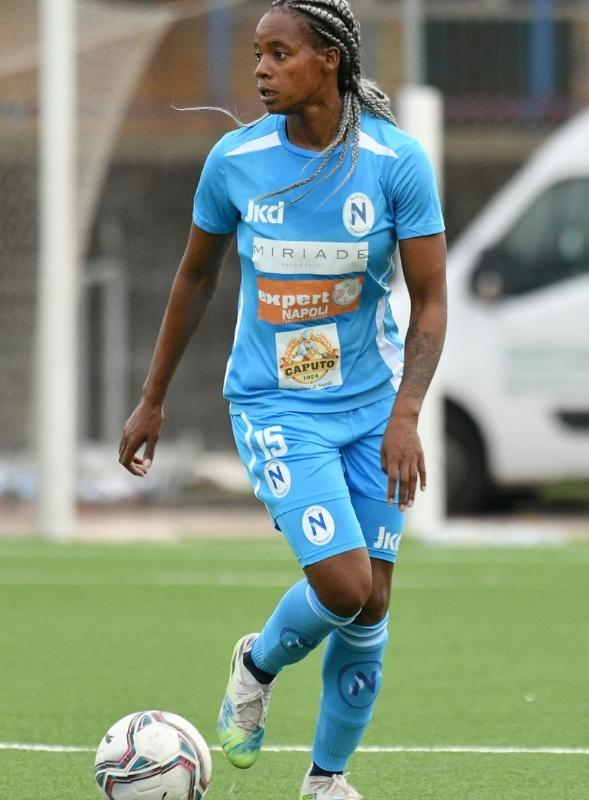
Awona with Napoli Femminile in 2022

Born in Yaoundé, Cameroon in 1993, Awona arrived in France at the age of six. She could have chosen to play for France internationally, and was a part of the France U19 team, but instead chose to represent Cameroon at senior level.

On 28 May 2015, Awona was selected in Cameroon's 23-player squad for 2015 FIFA Women's World Cup. After not playing the first two matches she made her FIFA Women's World Cup debut on 16 June 2015 in a 2–1 win against Switzerland in the last group stage match. She also started the next match in the Round of 16 against China.

At the 2019 FIFA Women's World Cup, she played in 3 out of 4 games.

In 2022, she was part of Braga when it finished third in the league and second in the cup.
