= Ajara Nchout =

Cameroonian footballer (born 1993)

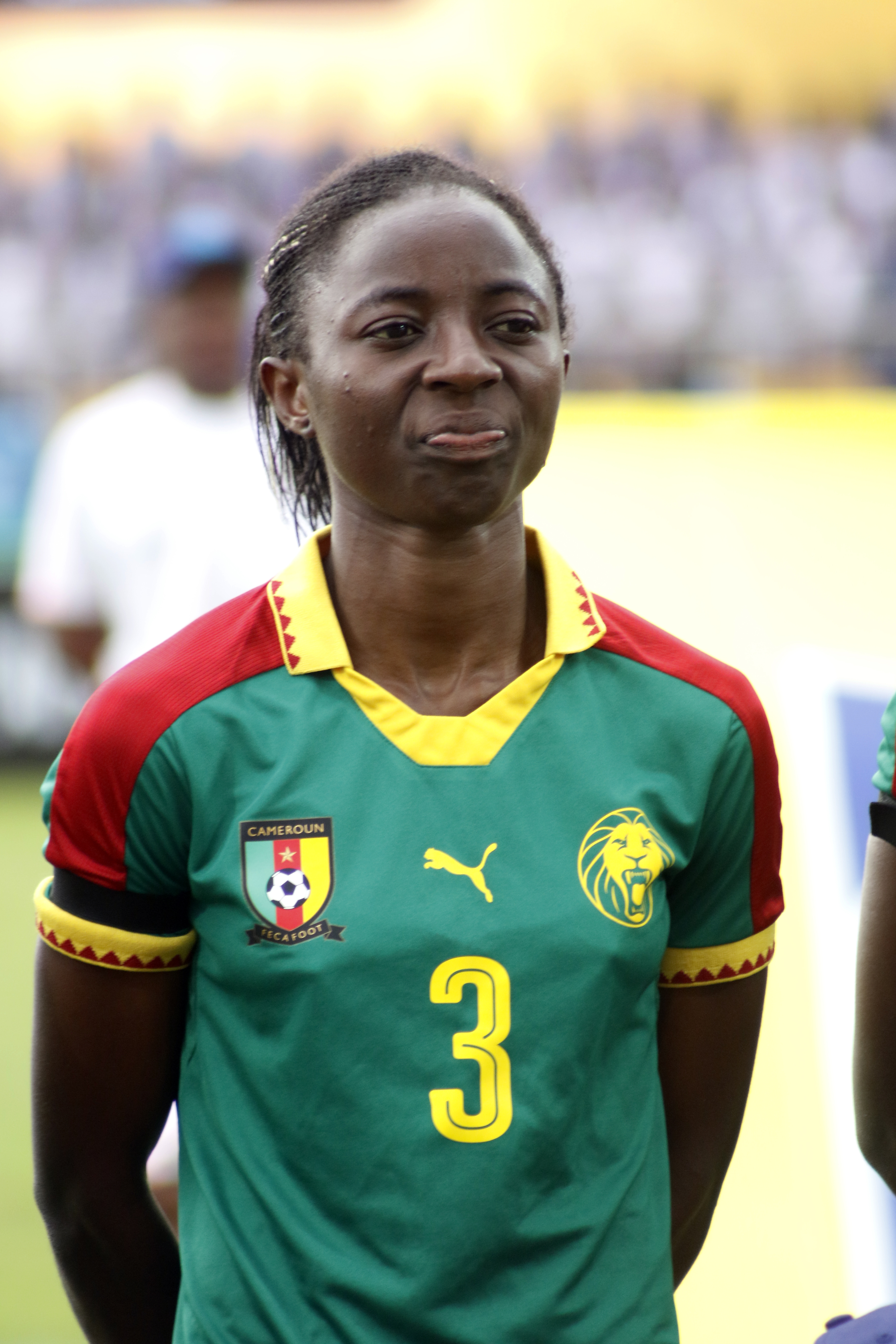
- Nchout playing for Cameroon

Personal information
- Full name: Ajara Nchout Njoya
- Date of birth: 12 January 1993 (age 33)
- Place of birth: Njissé, Cameroon
- Height: 1.64 m (5 ft 5 in)
- Position: Forward

Senior career*
Years	Team	Apps	(Gls)
2007–2010	Franck Rollycek de Douala	0	(0)
2011–2012	FC Energy Voronezh	23	(5)
2012–2013	WFC Rossiyanka	14	(2)
2014	AS Police de Yaoundé	0	(0)
2015	Western New York Flash	7	(0)
2016–2017	Sundsvalls	41	(22)
2018	IL Sandviken	19	(15)
2019–2020	Vålerenga	40	(20)
2021	Atlético Madrid	17	(2)
2021–2024	Inter Milan	39	(10)
2024–2026	Al Qadsiah	31	(29)

International career^{‡}
2012–	Cameroon	43	(15)
- * Club domestic league appearances and goals as of 22 April 2023 ‡ National team caps and goals as of 16:26, 23 June 2015 (UTC)

Ajara Nchout Njoya (born 12 January 1993) is a Cameroonian professional footballer who plays as a forward for the Cameroon women's national team.

== Early life ==
Born in Njissé, Foumban, Nchout states that her family discouraged her from playing football, preferring that she focus on education instead.

== Club career ==
In January 2015 Nchout agreed to join Western New York Flash of the NWSL. She had previously played in the Russian Top Division for FC Energy Voronezh and WFC Rossiyanka.

She was waived by the Flash in October 2015. In December 2015 she announced that she had signed for Sundsvalls DFF of the Swedish Elitettan.

Nchout later signed with Vålerenga after appearing in 22 matches for Sandviken. She missed the final of the Norwegian cup with Sandviken as she was on international duty with Cameroon, a match they lost.

== International career ==
As a member of the Cameroonian national team, she played at the 2012 Summer Olympics. She was also part of the national team at the 2015 FIFA Women's World Cup and 2019 FIFA Women's World Cup. She played all four matches in the 2015 World Cup, and scored a goal against Japan, the team that ended up placing second in the tournament. During the 2019 World Cup, she scored both of her team's goals in Cameroon's only win of group play that led them to the round of 16. In August 2019, she was nominated for 2019 FIFA Puskas Award for her goal against New Zealand at the FIFA Women's World Cup.

== Honours ==
Vålerenga

- Toppserien: 2020
- Norwegian Women's Cup: 2020

Atlético Madrid

- Supercopa de Espana: 2020–21

Cameroon

- Women's Africa Cup of Nations: runner-up: 2014, 2016, third place: 2018

Individual

- Elitettan top scorer: 2016
- Toppserien top scorer: 2020
- African Women's Footballer of the Year finalist: 2019, 2022

== Career statistics ==
=== International goals ===
No.	Date	Venue	Opponent	Score	Result	Competition
1.	24 May 2014	Stade Aline Sitoe Diatta, Ziguinchor, Senegal	Senegal	1–0	1–1	2014 African Women's Championship qualification
2.	12 June 2015	BC Place, Vancouver, Canada	Japan	1–0	1–2	2015 FIFA Women's World Cup
3.	6 June 2018	Stade Alphonse Massemba-Débat, Brazzaville, Congo	Congo	2–0	5–0	2018 Women's Africa Cup of Nations qualification
4.	9 June 2018	Stade Ahmadou Ahidjo, Yaoundé, Cameroon	Congo	1–0	5–0	2018 Women's Africa Cup of Nations qualification
5.	17 November 2018	Accra Sports Stadium, Accra, Ghana	Mali	2–1	2–1	2018 Women's Africa Cup of Nations
6.	20 November 2018	Accra Sports Stadium, Accra, Ghana	Algeria	3–0	3–0	2018 Women's Africa Cup of Nations
7.	20 June 2019	Stade de la Mosson, Montpellier, France	New Zealand	1–0	2–1	2019 FIFA Women's World Cup
8.	20 June 2019	Stade de la Mosson, Montpellier, France	New Zealand	2–1	2–1	2019 FIFA Women's World Cup
9.	3 October 2019	Stade Ahmadou Ahidjo, Yaoundé, Cameroon	DR Congo	2–0	2–0	2020 CAF Women's Olympic Qualifying Tournament
10.	8 October 2019	Stade des Martyrs, Kinshasa, DR Congo	DR Congo	1–2	1–2	2020 CAF Women's Olympic Qualifying Tournament
11.	12 November 2019	Stade Ahmadou Ahidjo, Yaoundé, Cameroon	Ivory Coast	2–1	2–1	2020 CAF Women's Olympic Qualifying Tournament
12.	5 March 2020	Stade Ahmadou Ahidjo, Yaoundé, Cameroon	Zambia	1–1	3–2	2020 CAF Women's Olympic Qualifying Tournament
13.	10 March 2020	Nkoloma Stadium, Lusaka, Zambia	Zambia	1–2	1–2	2020 CAF Women's Olympic Qualifying Tournament
14.	10 April 2021	Arslan Zeki Demirci Sports Complex, Antalya, Turkey	Chile	1–2	1–2	2020 Summer Olympics qualification
15.	18 February 2022	Stade Ahmadou Ahidjo, Yaoundé, Cameroon	Gambia	2–0	8–0	2022 Women's Africa Cup of Nations qualification
16	9 July 2022	Stade Mohammed V, Casablanca, Morocco	Tunisia	2–0	2–0	2022 Women's Africa Cup of Nations
17.	17 July 2022	Stade Moulay Hassan, Rabat, Morocco	Botswana	1–0	1–0	2022 Women's Africa Cup of Nations
18.	21 February 2023	Waikato Stadium, Hamilton, New Zealand	Portugal	1–1	1–2	2023 FIFA Women's World Cup qualification
19.	31 October 2023	Stade de la Réunification, Douala, Cameroon	Uganda	1–0	3–0 (a.e.t.)	2024 CAF Women's Olympic Qualifying Tournament
20.	24 October 2025	Miloud Hadefi Stadium, Oran, Algeria	Algeria	1–2	1–2	2026 Women's Africa Cup of Nations qualification
