= 2015 FIFA Women's World Cup squads =

Football squads

This is a list of squads of the 2015 FIFA Women's World Cup, an international women's association football tournament that was held in Canada from 6 June until 5 July 2015. The 24 national teams involved in the tournament were required to register a squad of 23 players, including three goalkeepers. Only players in these squads were eligible to take part in the tournament. The deadline to submit squads to FIFA was 25 May 2015.

Totals for caps and goals, club affiliations, and ages are as of the opening day of the tournament on 6 June 2015.

== Group A ==
=== Canada ===
Head coach: (England) John Herdman

The final 23-player squad was announced on 27 April 2015.

No.	Pos.	Player	Date of birth (age)	Caps	Goals	Club
1	GK	Erin McLeod	26 February 1983 (aged 32)	110	0	(United States Soccer Federation) Houston Dash
2	DF	Emily Zurrer	12 July 1987 (aged 27)	82	3	(Swedish Football Association) Jitex BK
3	DF	Kadeisha Buchanan	5 November 1995 (aged 19)	40	2	(United States Soccer Federation) West Virginia Univ.
4	DF	Carmelina Moscato	2 May 1984 (aged 31)	94	2	Unattached
5	DF	Robyn Gayle	31 October 1985 (aged 29)	81	2	Unattached
6	MF	Kaylyn Kyle	6 October 1988 (aged 26)	101	6	(United States Soccer Federation) Portland Thorns
7	DF	Rhian Wilkinson	12 May 1982 (aged 33)	166	7	(United States Soccer Federation) Portland Thorns
8	MF	Diana Matheson	6 April 1984 (aged 31)	167	15	(United States Soccer Federation) Washington Spirit
9	FW	Josée Bélanger	14 May 1986 (aged 29)	35	5	Unattached
10	DF	Lauren Sesselmann	14 August 1983 (aged 31)	44	0	(United States Soccer Federation) Houston Dash
11	MF	Desiree Scott	31 July 1987 (aged 27)	95	0	(The Football Association) Notts County
12	FW	Christine Sinclair (captain)	12 June 1983 (aged 31)	228	155	(United States Soccer Federation) Portland Thorns
13	MF	Sophie Schmidt	28 June 1988 (aged 26)	137	16	Unattached
14	FW	Melissa Tancredi	27 December 1981 (aged 33)	105	22	(United States Soccer Federation) Chicago Red Stars
15	DF	Allysha Chapman	25 January 1989 (aged 26)	17	1	(United States Soccer Federation) Houston Dash
16	FW	Jonelle Filigno	24 September 1990 (aged 24)	71	11	(United States Soccer Federation) Sky Blue
17	MF	Jessie Fleming	11 March 1998 (aged 17)	18	1	(Canadian Soccer Association) Nor'West SC
18	MF	Selenia Iacchelli	5 June 1986 (aged 29)	4	0	Unattached
19	FW	Adriana Leon	2 October 1992 (aged 22)	38	5	(United States Soccer Federation) Chicago Red Stars
20	DF	Marie-Ève Nault	16 February 1982 (aged 33)	68	0	Unattached
21	GK	Stephanie Labbé	10 October 1986 (aged 28)	20	0	Unattached
22	DF	Ashley Lawrence	11 June 1995 (aged 19)	23	1	(United States Soccer Federation) West Virginia Univ.
23	GK	Karina LeBlanc	30 March 1980 (aged 35)	110	0	(United States Soccer Federation) Chicago Red Stars

=== China ===
Head coach: Hao Wei

A 29-player provisional squad was revealed on 17 April 2015, which was reduced to 25 players on 14 May 2015. The final 23-player squad was announced on 28 May 2015.

No.	Pos.	Player	Date of birth (age)	Caps	Goals	Club
1	GK	Zhang Yue	30 September 1990 (aged 24)	48	0	(Chinese Football Association) Beijing BG
2	DF	Liu Shanshan	16 March 1992 (aged 23)	33	0	(Chinese Football Association) Hebei Zhongji
3	DF	Pang Fengyue	19 January 1989 (aged 26)	50	7	(Chinese Football Association) Dalian Junfeng
4	DF	Li Jiayue	8 June 1990 (aged 24)	45	1	(Chinese Football Association) Shanghai Vinpac
5	DF	Wu Haiyan (captain)	26 February 1993 (aged 22)	50	0	(Chinese Football Association) Shandong
6	DF	Li Dongna	6 December 1988 (aged 26)	50	5	(Korea Football Association) Suwon FMC
7	MF	Xu Yanlu	16 September 1991 (aged 23)	27	3	(Chinese Football Association) Jiangsu Huatai
8	MF	Ma Jun	6 March 1989 (aged 26)	50	15	(Korea Football Association) Daejeon Sportstoto
9	FW	Wang Shanshan	27 January 1990 (aged 25)	41	0	(Chinese Football Association) Tianjin Huisen
10	FW	Li Ying	7 January 1993 (aged 22)	8	2	(Chinese Football Association) Shandong
11	FW	Wang Shuang	23 January 1995 (aged 20)	11	1	(Chinese Football Association) Wuhan Jianghan Univ.
12	GK	Wang Fei	22 March 1990 (aged 25)	52	0	(German Football Association) Turbine Potsdam
13	FW	Tang Jiali	16 March 1995 (aged 20)	10	2	(Chinese Football Association) Shanghai Vinpac
14	FW	Zhao Rong	2 August 1991 (aged 23)	14	0	(Chinese Football Association) Beijing BG
15	MF	Lei Jiahui	22 September 1995 (aged 19)	6	0	(Chinese Football Association) Henan
16	MF	Lou Jiahui	26 May 1991 (aged 24)	45	1	(Chinese Football Association) Henan
17	FW	Gu Yasha	28 November 1990 (aged 24)	87	10	(Chinese Football Association) Beijing BG
18	FW	Han Peng	20 December 1989 (aged 25)	52	3	(Chinese Football Association) Tianjin Huisen
19	MF	Tan Ruyin	17 July 1994 (aged 20)	8	0	(Chinese Football Association) Guangdong Sports Lottery
20	MF	Zhang Rui	17 January 1989 (aged 26)	60	11	(Chinese Football Association) Liberation Army FC
21	FW	Wang Lisi	28 November 1991 (aged 23)	45	5	(Chinese Football Association) Jiangsu Huatai
22	GK	Zhao Lina	18 September 1991 (aged 23)	0	0	(Chinese Football Association) Shanghai Vinpac
23	MF	Ren Guixin	19 December 1988 (aged 26)	45	5	(Chinese Football Association) Changchun Zhuoyue

=== Netherlands ===
Head coach: Roger Reijners

The final 23-player squad was announced on 10 May 2015. Claudia van den Heiligenberg was ruled out because on an injury and was replaced by Shanice van de Sanden.

No.	Pos.	Player	Date of birth (age)	Caps	Goals	Club
1	GK	Loes Geurts	12 January 1986 (aged 29)	103	0	(Swedish Football Association) Kopparbergs/Göteborg FC
2	DF	Desiree van Lunteren	30 December 1992 (aged 22)	21	0	(Royal Dutch Football Association) AFC Ajax
3	DF	Stefanie van der Gragt	16 August 1992 (aged 22)	22	1	(Royal Dutch Football Association) Telstar
4	DF	Mandy van den Berg (captain)	26 August 1990 (aged 24)	57	3	(Norwegian Football Federation) LSK Kvinner FK
5	DF	Petra Hogewoning	26 March 1986 (aged 29)	96	0	(Royal Dutch Football Association) AFC Ajax
6	DF	Anouk Dekker	15 November 1986 (aged 28)	38	5	(Royal Dutch Football Association) FC Twente
7	FW	Manon Melis	31 August 1986 (aged 28)	123	54	(Swedish Football Association) Kopparbergs/Göteborg FC
8	MF	Sherida Spitse	29 May 1990 (aged 25)	104	15	(Norwegian Football Federation) LSK Kvinner FK
9	FW	Vivianne Miedema	15 July 1996 (aged 18)	23	19	(German Football Association) FC Bayern Munich
10	MF	Daniëlle van de Donk	5 August 1991 (aged 23)	35	6	(Royal Dutch Football Association) PSV/FC Eindhoven
11	FW	Lieke Martens	16 December 1992 (aged 22)	49	20	(Swedish Football Association) Kopparbergs/Göteborg FC
12	DF	Dyanne Bito	10 August 1981 (aged 33)	146	6	(Royal Dutch Football Association) Telstar
13	DF	Dominique Bloodworth	17 January 1995 (aged 20)	6	0	(German Football Association) SGS Essen
14	MF	Anouk Hoogendijk	6 May 1985 (aged 30)	101	9	(Royal Dutch Football Association) AFC Ajax
15	DF	Merel van Dongen	11 February 1993 (aged 22)	4	1	(Royal Dutch Football Association) AFC Ajax
16	GK	Sari van Veenendaal	3 April 1990 (aged 25)	13	0	(Royal Dutch Football Association) FC Twente
17	MF	Tessel Middag	23 December 1992 (aged 22)	24	3	(Royal Dutch Football Association) AFC Ajax
18	DF	Maran van Erp	3 December 1990 (aged 24)	1	0	(Royal Dutch Football Association) PSV/FC Eindhoven
19	FW	Kirsten van de Ven	11 May 1985 (aged 30)	82	16	(Swedish Football Association) FC Rosengård
20	MF	Jill Roord	22 April 1997 (aged 18)	5	1	(Royal Dutch Football Association) FC Twente
21	MF	Vanity Lewerissa	1 April 1991 (aged 24)	4	0	(Royal Belgian Football Association) Standard Liège
22	FW	Shanice van de Sanden	2 October 1992 (aged 22)	15	3	(Royal Dutch Football Association) FC Twente
23	GK	Angela Christ	6 March 1989 (aged 26)	13	0	(Royal Dutch Football Association) PSV/FC Eindhoven

=== New Zealand ===
Head coach: (England) Tony Readings

A 20-player squad was announced on 19 March 2015. The final roster was revealed on 14 May 2015.

No.	Pos.	Player	Date of birth (age)	Caps	Goals	Club
1	GK	Erin Nayler	17 April 1992 (aged 23)	28	0	(New Zealand Football) Norwest United
2	MF	Ria Percival	7 December 1989 (aged 25)	103	11	(German Football Association) USV Jena
3	DF	Anna Green	20 August 1990 (aged 24)	55	7	Unattached
4	MF	Katie Hoyle	1 February 1988 (aged 27)	102	1	(Swiss Football Association) FC Zürich
5	DF	Abby Erceg (captain)	20 November 1989 (aged 25)	113	4	(United States Soccer Federation) Chicago Red Stars
6	DF	Rebekah Stott	17 June 1993 (aged 21)	39	0	Unattached
7	DF	Ali Riley	30 October 1987 (aged 27)	92	1	(Swedish Football Association) FC Rosengård
8	FW	Jasmine Pereira	20 July 1996 (aged 18)	8	0	(New Zealand Football) Three Kings United
9	FW	Amber Hearn	28 November 1984 (aged 30)	99	45	(German Football Association) USV Jena
10	FW	Sarah Gregorius	6 August 1987 (aged 27)	66	23	(Japan Football Association) AS Elfen Saitama
11	MF	Kirsty Yallop	4 November 1986 (aged 28)	89	12	(Swedish Football Association) Vittsjö GIK
12	MF	Betsy Hassett	4 August 1990 (aged 24)	79	8	Unattached
13	MF	Rosie White	6 June 1993 (aged 22)	69	14	Unattached
14	MF	Katie Bowen	15 April 1994 (aged 21)	26	0	(United States Soccer Federation) Univ. of North Carolina
15	DF	Meikayla Moore	4 June 1996 (aged 19)	10	0	(New Zealand Football) Eastern Suburbs
16	MF	Annalie Longo	1 July 1991 (aged 23)	78	6	(New Zealand Football) Coastal Spirit
17	FW	Hannah Wilkinson	28 May 1992 (aged 23)	69	22	(United States Soccer Federation) Univ. of Tennessee
18	DF	C. J. Bott	22 April 1995 (aged 20)	1	0	(New Zealand Football) Forrest Hill Milford
19	MF	Evie Millynn	23 November 1994 (aged 20)	2	0	(New Zealand Football) Eastern Suburbs
20	MF	Daisy Cleverley	30 April 1997 (aged 18)	3	2	(New Zealand Football) Forrest Hill Milford
21	GK	Rebecca Rolls	22 August 1975 (aged 39)	21	0	(New Zealand Football) Three Kings United
22	FW	Emma Kete	1 September 1987 (aged 27)	48	3	(New Zealand Football) Fencibles United
23	GK	Cushla Lichtwark	29 November 1980 (aged 34)	0	0	(New Zealand Football) Hutt City

== Group B ==
=== Germany ===
Head coach: Silvia Neid

A 27-player preliminary roster was announced on 11 May 2015. The final squad was revealed on 24 May 2015.

No.	Pos.	Player	Date of birth (age)	Caps	Goals	Club
1	GK	Nadine Angerer (captain)	10 November 1978 (aged 36)	139	0	(United States Soccer Federation) Portland Thorns
2	DF	Bianca Schmidt	23 January 1990 (aged 25)	48	3	(German Football Association) 1. FFC Frankfurt
3	DF	Saskia Bartusiak	9 September 1982 (aged 32)	80	1	(German Football Association) 1. FFC Frankfurt
4	DF	Leonie Maier	29 September 1992 (aged 22)	25	3	(German Football Association) FC Bayern Munich
5	DF	Annike Krahn	1 July 1985 (aged 29)	117	5	(French Football Federation) Paris Saint-Germain
6	MF	Simone Laudehr	12 July 1986 (aged 28)	88	24	(German Football Association) 1. FFC Frankfurt
7	MF	Melanie Behringer	18 November 1985 (aged 29)	104	26	(German Football Association) FC Bayern Munich
8	FW	Pauline Bremer	10 April 1996 (aged 19)	5	0	(German Football Association) 1. FFC Turbine Potsdam
9	FW	Lena Lotzen	11 September 1993 (aged 21)	22	4	(German Football Association) FC Bayern Munich
10	MF	Dzsenifer Marozsán	18 April 1992 (aged 23)	48	25	(German Football Association) 1. FFC Frankfurt
11	FW	Anja Mittag	16 May 1985 (aged 30)	120	33	(Swedish Football Association) FC Rosengård
12	GK	Almuth Schult	9 February 1991 (aged 24)	20	0	(German Football Association) VfL Wolfsburg
13	FW	Célia Šašić	27 June 1988 (aged 26)	104	57	(German Football Association) 1. FFC Frankfurt
14	DF	Babett Peter	12 May 1988 (aged 27)	89	4	(German Football Association) VfL Wolfsburg
15	DF	Jennifer Cramer	24 February 1993 (aged 22)	21	0	(German Football Association) 1. FFC Turbine Potsdam
16	MF	Melanie Leupolz	14 April 1994 (aged 21)	28	5	(German Football Association) FC Bayern Munich
17	DF	Josephine Henning	8 September 1989 (aged 25)	25	0	(French Football Federation) Paris Saint-Germain
18	FW	Alexandra Popp	6 April 1991 (aged 24)	54	27	(German Football Association) VfL Wolfsburg
19	FW	Lena Petermann	5 February 1994 (aged 21)	2	0	(German Football Association) SC Freiburg
20	MF	Lena Goeßling	8 March 1986 (aged 29)	72	8	(German Football Association) VfL Wolfsburg
21	GK	Laura Benkarth	14 October 1992 (aged 22)	0	0	(German Football Association) SC Freiburg
22	DF	Tabea Kemme	14 December 1991 (aged 23)	13	0	(German Football Association) 1. FFC Turbine Potsdam
23	MF	Sara Däbritz	15 February 1995 (aged 20)	16	0	(German Football Association) SC Freiburg

=== Ivory Coast ===
Head coach: Clémentine Touré

A 23-player squad was announced on 15 May 2015.

No.	Pos.	Player	Date of birth (age)	Caps	Goals	Club
1	GK	Lydie Saki	22 December 1984 (aged 30)	27	0	(Ivorian Football Federation) Juventus de Yopougon
2	DF	Fatou Coulibaly	13 February 1987 (aged 28)	31	1	(Ivorian Football Federation) Juventus de Yopougon
3	DF	Djelika Coulibaly	22 February 1984 (aged 31)	29	0	(Ivorian Football Federation) Juventus de Yopougon
4	DF	Nina Kpaho	30 December 1996 (aged 18)	12	0	(Ivorian Football Federation) Juventus de Yopougon
5	DF	Mariam Diakité	11 April 1995 (aged 20)	12	9	(Ivorian Football Federation) ES Abobo
6	MF	Rita Akaffou	5 December 1986 (aged 28)	33	4	(Ivorian Football Federation) Juventus de Yopougon
7	FW	Nadege Essoh	5 May 1990 (aged 25)	29	4	(Ivorian Football Federation) Juventus de Yopougon
8	FW	Ines Nrehy	1 October 1993 (aged 21)	17	13	(Russian Football Union) WFC Rossiyanka
9	FW	Sandrine Niamien	30 August 1994 (aged 20)	2	1	(Ivorian Football Federation) ES Abobo
10	FW	Ange N'Guessan	18 November 1990 (aged 24)	19	3	(Ivorian Football Federation) Omness de Dabou
11	FW	Rebecca Elloh	25 December 1994 (aged 20)	15	2	(Ivorian Football Federation) Onze Sœurs de Gagnoa
12	MF	Ida Guehai	15 July 1994 (aged 20)	22	1	(Swedish Football Association) Kristianstads DFF
13	DF	Fernande Tchetche	20 June 1988 (aged 26)	19	0	(Ivorian Football Federation) Omness de Dabou
14	FW	Josée Nahi	29 May 1989 (aged 26)	18	12	(Russian Football Union) Zvezda 2005 Perm
15	MF	Christine Lohoues	18 October 1992 (aged 22)	22	1	(Ivorian Football Federation) Onze Sœurs de Gagnoa
16	GK	Dominique Thiamale (captain)	20 May 1982 (aged 33)	27	0	(Ivorian Football Federation) Omness de Dabou
17	FW	Nadège Cissé	4 April 1997 (aged 18)	6	0	(Ivorian Football Federation) ES Abobo
18	MF	Binta Diakité	7 May 1988 (aged 27)	20	2	(Tunisian Football Federation) ASF Medenine
19	MF	Jessica Aby	16 June 1998 (aged 16)	1	0	(Ivorian Football Federation) Onze Sœurs de Gagnoa
20	MF	Aminata Haidara	13 May 1997 (aged 18)	4	0	(Ivorian Football Federation) Onze Sœurs de Gagnoa
21	DF	Sophie Aguie	31 December 1996 (aged 18)	4	0	(Ivorian Football Federation) Omness de Dabou
22	DF	Raymonde Kacou	7 January 1987 (aged 28)	6	0	(Ivorian Football Federation) Juventus de Yopougon
23	GK	Cynthia Djohore	16 December 1987 (aged 27)	27	0	(Ivorian Football Federation) Onze Sœurs de Gagnoa

=== Norway ===
Head coach: Even Pellerud

A 35-player preliminary squad was revealed on 23 April 2015. The final 23-player squad was announced on 13 May. Caroline Graham Hansen was ruled out because on an injury and was replaced by Anja Sønstevold.

No.	Pos.	Player	Date of birth (age)	Caps	Goals	Club
1	GK	Ingrid Hjelmseth	10 April 1980 (aged 35)	92	0	(Norwegian Football Federation) Stabæk
2	DF	Maria Thorisdottir	5 June 1993 (aged 22)	5	0	(Norwegian Football Federation) Klepp IL
3	DF	Marita Skammelsrud Lund	29 January 1989 (aged 26)	62	2	(Norwegian Football Federation) LSK Kvinner FK
4	MF	Gry Tofte Ims	2 March 1986 (aged 29)	42	4	(Norwegian Football Federation) Klepp IL
5	FW	Lisa-Marie Karlseng Utland	19 September 1992 (aged 22)	1	0	(Norwegian Football Federation) Trondheims-Ørn SK
6	MF	Maren Mjelde	6 November 1989 (aged 25)	87	10	(Norwegian Football Federation) Avaldsnes IL
7	DF	Trine Rønning (captain)	14 June 1982 (aged 32)	153	21	(Norwegian Football Federation) Stabæk
8	MF	Solveig Gulbrandsen	12 January 1981 (aged 34)	179	53	(Norwegian Football Federation) Kolbotn
9	FW	Isabell Herlovsen	23 June 1988 (aged 26)	100	41	(Norwegian Football Federation) LSK Kvinner FK
10	MF	Anja Sønstevold	21 June 1992 (aged 22)	3	0	(Norwegian Football Federation) LSK Kvinner FK
11	DF	Nora Holstad Berge	26 March 1987 (aged 28)	46	1	(German Football Association) FC Bayern Munich
12	GK	Silje Vesterbekkmo	22 June 1983 (aged 31)	8	0	(Norwegian Football Federation) Røa IL
13	DF	Ingrid Moe Wold	29 January 1990 (aged 25)	10	1	(Norwegian Football Federation) LSK Kvinner FK
14	MF	Ingrid Schjelderup	21 December 1987 (aged 27)	9	0	(Norwegian Football Federation) Stabæk
15	DF	Marit Sandvei	21 May 1987 (aged 28)	7	0	(Norwegian Football Federation) LSK Kvinner FK
16	FW	Elise Thorsnes	14 August 1988 (aged 26)	81	16	(Norwegian Football Federation) Avaldsnes IL
17	MF	Lene Mykjåland	20 February 1987 (aged 28)	78	11	(Norwegian Football Federation) LSK Kvinner FK
18	FW	Melissa Bjånesøy	18 April 1992 (aged 23)	20	4	(Norwegian Football Federation) Stabæk
19	MF	Kristine Minde	8 August 1992 (aged 22)	47	6	(Swedish Football Association) Linköpings FC
20	FW	Emilie Haavi	16 June 1992 (aged 22)	40	11	(Norwegian Football Federation) LSK Kvinner FK
21	FW	Ada Hegerberg	10 July 1995 (aged 19)	34	16	(French Football Federation) Olympique Lyon
22	FW	Hege Hansen	24 October 1990 (aged 24)	9	4	(Norwegian Football Federation) Klepp IL
23	GK	Cecilie Fiskerstrand	20 March 1996 (aged 19)	3	0	(Norwegian Football Federation) Stabæk

=== Thailand ===
Head coach: Nuengrutai Srathongvian

A 28-player squad was announced on 19 May 2015. The final squad was named on 26 May 2015. On 6 June 2015, Nattaya Duanjanthuek replaced Irravadee Makris.

No.	Pos.	Player	Date of birth (age)	Caps	Goals	Club
1	GK	Waraporn Boonsing	16 February 1990 (aged 25)	84	0	(Football Association of Thailand) BG Bundit Asia
2	DF	Darut Changplook	3 February 1988 (aged 27)	20	1	(Football Association of Thailand) North Bangkok College
3	DF	Natthakarn Chinwong	15 March 1992 (aged 23)	8	0	(Football Association of Thailand) BG Bundit Asia
4	DF	Duangnapa Sritala (captain)	4 February 1986 (aged 29)	22	2	(Football Association of Thailand) Bangkok F.C.
5	DF	Ainon Phancha	27 January 1992 (aged 23)	7	3	(Football Association of Thailand) Chonburi Sriprathum
6	MF	Pikul Khueanpet	20 September 1988 (aged 26)	41	0	(Football Association of Thailand) Khonkaen F.C.
7	MF	Silawan Intamee	22 January 1994 (aged 21)	11	0	(Football Association of Thailand) Chonburi Sriprathum
8	MF	Naphat Seesraum	11 May 1987 (aged 28)	83	20	(Football Association of Thailand) BG Bundit Asia
9	DF	Warunee Phetwiset	13 December 1990 (aged 24)	41	0	(Football Association of Thailand) Chonburi Sriprathum
10	DF	Sunisa Srangthaisong	6 May 1988 (aged 27)	24	2	(Football Association of Thailand) BG Bundit Asia
11	FW	Alisa Rukpinij	2 February 1995 (aged 20)	3	0	(Football Association of Thailand) Chonburi Sriprathum
12	MF	Rattikan Thongsombut	7 July 1991 (aged 23)	18	3	(Football Association of Thailand) BG Bundit Asia
13	FW	Orathai Srimanee	12 June 1988 (aged 26)	5	0	(Football Association of Thailand) Khonkaen F.C.
14	FW	Thanatta Chawong	19 June 1989 (aged 25)	66	23	(Football Association of Thailand) BG Bundit Asia
15	MF	Nattaya Duanjanthuek	9 June 1991 (aged 23)	1	0	(Football Association of Thailand) BG Bundit Asia
16	DF	Khwanrudi Saengchan	10 September 1993 (aged 21)	20	0	(Football Association of Thailand) BG Bundit Asia
17	MF	Anootsara Maijarern	14 February 1986 (aged 29)	80	21	(Football Association of Thailand) Air Force United
18	GK	Yada Sengyong	10 September 1993 (aged 21)	3	0	(Football Association of Thailand) North Bangkok College
19	FW	Taneekarn Dangda	15 December 1992 (aged 22)	16	9	(Football Association of Thailand) Bangkok F.C.
20	MF	Wilaiporn Boothduang	25 June 1987 (aged 27)	45	11	(Football Association of Thailand) Bangkok F.C.
21	MF	Kanjana Sungngoen	21 September 1986 (aged 28)	44	30	(Football Association of Thailand) Bangkok F.C.
22	GK	Sukanya Chor Charoenying	24 November 1987 (aged 27)	8	0	(Football Association of Thailand) Air Force United
23	FW	Nisa Romyen	18 January 1990 (aged 25)	47	32	(Football Association of Thailand) North Bangkok College

== Group C ==
=== Cameroon ===
Head coach: Carl Enow Ngachu

A 25-player squad was announced on 17 April 2015.

No.	Pos.	Player	Date of birth (age)	Caps	Goals	Club
1	GK	Annette Ngo Ndom	2 June 1985 (aged 30)	40	0	(Slovak Football Association) Union Nové Zámky
2	DF	Christine Manie (captain)	4 May 1984 (aged 31)	59	9	(Romanian Football Federation) CFF Olimpia Cluj
3	FW	Ajara Nchout	12 January 1993 (aged 22)	39	2	(United States Soccer Federation) Western New York Flash
4	DF	Yvonne Leuko	20 November 1991 (aged 23)	23	0	(French Football Federation) Arras FCF
5	DF	Augustine Ejangue	19 January 1989 (aged 26)	56	0	(Russian Football Union) Energy Voronezh
6	FW	Francine Zouga	9 November 1987 (aged 27)	52	5	(Swiss Football Association) FF Chênois
7	FW	Gabrielle Onguéné	25 February 1989 (aged 26)	49	13	(Cameroonian Football Federation) Louves Minproff
8	MF	Raissa Feudjio	29 October 1995 (aged 19)	40	1	(Football Association of Finland) Merilappi United
9	FW	Madeleine Ngono Mani	16 October 1983 (aged 31)	72	38	(French Football Federation) Claix Football
10	FW	Jeannette Yango	12 June 1993 (aged 21)	31	1	(French Football Federation) FF Yzeure
11	DF	Aurelle Awona	2 February 1993 (aged 22)	2	0	(French Football Federation) ASJ Soyaux
12	DF	Claudine Meffometou	1 July 1990 (aged 24)	21	1	(Russian Football Union) Zvezda 2005 Perm
13	DF	Cathy Bou Ndjouh	7 November 1987 (aged 27)	52	0	(Football Federation of Belarus) FC Minsk
14	MF	Ninon Abena	5 September 1994 (aged 20)	3	0	(Cameroonian Football Federation) Louves Minproff
15	DF	Ysis Sonkeng	20 September 1989 (aged 25)	42	0	(Cameroonian Football Federation) Louves Minproff
16	GK	Thècle Mbororo	24 September 1989 (aged 25)	5	0	(Cameroonian Football Federation) Panthère de Garoua
17	FW	Gaëlle Enganamouit	9 June 1992 (aged 22)	39	2	(Swedish Football Association) Eskilstuna United
18	MF	Henriette Akaba	7 June 1992 (aged 22)	31	0	(Cameroonian Football Federation) Louves Minproff
19	MF	Agathe Ngani	26 May 1992 (aged 23)	3	0	(Cameroonian Football Federation) Louves Minproff
20	MF	Genevieve Ngo Mbeleck	10 March 1993 (aged 22)	6	0	(Cameroonian Football Federation) Caïman Douala
21	FW	Rose Bella	5 May 1994 (aged 21)	7	0	(Cameroonian Football Federation) AS Police
22	DF	Wanki Awachwi	6 January 1994 (aged 21)	5	0	(Cameroonian Football Federation) Locomotive Yaoundé
23	GK	Flore Enyegue	9 July 1991 (aged 23)	9	0	(Cameroonian Football Federation) AS Police

=== Ecuador ===
Head coach: Vanessa Arauz

A 25-player squad was announced on 24 April 2015. The final squad was revealed on 15 May 2015.

No.	Pos.	Player	Date of birth (age)	Caps	Goals	Club
1	GK	Shirley Berruz	6 January 1991 (aged 24)	25	0	(Ecuadorian Football Federation) Rocafuerte Fútbol Club
2	DF	Katherine Ortiz	16 February 1991 (aged 24)	23	3	(Ecuadorian Football Federation) Rocafuerte Fútbol Club
3	DF	Lorena Aguilar	6 July 1985 (aged 29)	46	0	(Ecuadorian Football Federation) Atlético de Febrero
4	DF	Merly Zambrano	7 December 1981 (aged 33)	11	0	(Ecuadorian Football Federation) Espuce
5	MF	Mayra Olvera	22 August 1992 (aged 22)	33	2	(Ecuadorian Football Federation) Atlético de Febrero
6	DF	Angie Ponce	14 July 1996 (aged 18)	28	4	(Ecuadorian Football Federation) Talleres Emanuel
7	DF	Ingrid Rodríguez	24 November 1991 (aged 23)	34	6	(Ecuadorian Football Federation) Unión Española
8	MF	Erika Vásquez	4 August 1992 (aged 22)	32	3	(Ecuadorian Football Federation) Unión Española
9	FW	Giannina Lattanzio	19 May 1993 (aged 22)	13	0	(Ecuadorian Football Federation) Atlético de Febrero
10	FW	Ámbar Torres	21 December 1994 (aged 20)	23	10	(Ecuadorian Football Federation) Talleres Emanuel
11	FW	Mónica Quinteros	5 July 1988 (aged 26)	42	8	(Ecuadorian Football Federation) Atlético de Febrero
12	GK	Irene Tobar	5 May 1989 (aged 26)	10	0	(Ecuadorian Football Federation) Atlético de Febrero
13	MF	Madelin Riera	7 August 1989 (aged 25)	32	0	(Ecuadorian Football Federation) Unión Española
14	FW	Carina Caicedo	23 July 1987 (aged 27)	8	1	(Ecuadorian Football Federation) Deportivo Quito
15	MF	Valeria Palacios	16 February 1991 (aged 24)	30	0	(Ecuadorian Football Federation) Rocafuerte Fútbol Club
16	DF	Ligia Moreira (captain)	19 March 1992 (aged 23)	44	3	(Ecuadorian Football Federation) Atlético de Febrero
17	MF	Alexandra Salvador	11 August 1995 (aged 19)	13	0	(Ecuadorian Football Federation) Universidad de Quito
18	MF	Adriana Barré	4 April 1995 (aged 20)	23	0	(Ecuadorian Football Federation) Galápagos S.C.
19	MF	Kerlly Real	7 November 1998 (aged 16)	24	2	(Ecuadorian Football Federation) Espuce
20	FW	Denise Pesántes	14 January 1988 (aged 27)	32	3	(Ecuadorian Football Federation) Galápagos S.C.
21	MF	Mabel Velarde	4 December 1988 (aged 26)	13	0	(Ecuadorian Football Federation) Deportivo Quito
22	GK	Andrea Vera	10 April 1993 (aged 22)	2	0	(Ecuadorian Football Federation) Universidad de Quito
23	FW	Mariela Jácome	6 March 1996 (aged 19)	1	0	(Ecuadorian Football Federation) Universidad de Quito

=== Japan ===
Head coach: Norio Sasaki

The roster was announced on 1 May 2015.

No.	Pos.	Player	Date of birth (age)	Caps	Goals	Club
1	GK	Miho Fukumoto	2 October 1983 (aged 31)	77	0	(Japan Football Association) Okayama Yunogo Belle
2	DF	Yukari Kinga	2 May 1984 (aged 31)	94	5	(Japan Football Association) INAC Kobe Leonessa
3	DF	Azusa Iwashimizu	14 October 1986 (aged 28)	111	11	(Japan Football Association) NTV Beleza
4	DF	Saki Kumagai	17 October 1990 (aged 24)	65	0	(French Football Federation) Olympique Lyon
5	DF	Aya Sameshima	16 June 1987 (aged 27)	60	3	(Japan Football Association) INAC Kobe Leonessa
6	MF	Mizuho Sakaguchi	15 October 1987 (aged 27)	89	26	(Japan Football Association) NTV Beleza
7	MF	Kozue Ando	9 July 1982 (aged 32)	123	19	(German Football Association) 1. FFC Frankfurt
8	MF	Aya Miyama (captain)	28 January 1985 (aged 30)	147	36	(Japan Football Association) Okayama Yunogo Belle
9	MF	Nahomi Kawasumi	23 September 1985 (aged 29)	70	19	(Japan Football Association) INAC Kobe Leonessa
10	MF	Homare Sawa	6 September 1978 (aged 36)	197	82	(Japan Football Association) INAC Kobe Leonessa
11	FW	Shinobu Ohno	23 January 1984 (aged 31)	128	39	(Japan Football Association) INAC Kobe Leonessa
12	DF	Megumi Kamionobe	15 March 1986 (aged 29)	29	2	(Japan Football Association) Albirex Niigata
13	MF	Rumi Utsugi	5 December 1988 (aged 26)	78	5	(French Football Federation) Montpellier HSC
14	MF	Asuna Tanaka	23 April 1988 (aged 27)	33	3	(Japan Football Association) INAC Kobe Leonessa
15	FW	Yuika Sugasawa	5 October 1990 (aged 24)	28	9	(Japan Football Association) JEF United
16	FW	Mana Iwabuchi	18 March 1993 (aged 22)	25	3	(German Football Association) FC Bayern Munich
17	FW	Yūki Ōgimi	15 July 1987 (aged 27)	115	52	(German Football Association) VfL Wolfsburg
18	GK	Ayumi Kaihori	4 September 1986 (aged 28)	47	0	(Japan Football Association) INAC Kobe Leonessa
19	DF	Saori Ariyoshi	1 November 1987 (aged 27)	34	0	(Japan Football Association) NTV Beleza
20	DF	Yuri Kawamura	17 May 1989 (aged 26)	13	2	(Japan Football Association) Vegalta Sendai Ladies
21	GK	Erina Yamane	20 December 1990 (aged 24)	14	0	(Japan Football Association) JEF United
22	MF	Asano Nagasato	24 January 1989 (aged 26)	10	1	(German Football Association) 1. FFC Turbine Potsdam
23	DF	Kana Kitahara	17 December 1988 (aged 26)	14	2	(Japan Football Association) Albirex Niigata

=== Switzerland ===
Head coach: (Germany) Martina Voss-Tecklenburg

A 27-player squad was announced on 13 May 2015. The final 23-player squad was announced on 22 May 2015.

No.	Pos.	Player	Date of birth (age)	Caps	Goals	Club
1	GK	Gaëlle Thalmann	18 January 1986 (aged 29)	36	0	(German Football Association) MSV Duisburg
2	DF	Nicole Remund	31 December 1989 (aged 25)	42	2	(Swiss Football Association) FC Zürich
3	DF	Sandra Betschart	30 March 1989 (aged 26)	66	2	(Swedish Football Association) Sunnanå SK
4	DF	Rachel Rinast	2 June 1991 (aged 24)	6	0	(German Football Association) 1. FC Köln
5	DF	Noelle Maritz	23 December 1995 (aged 19)	29	1	(German Football Association) VfL Wolfsburg
6	DF	Selina Kuster	8 August 1991 (aged 23)	59	1	(Swiss Football Association) FC Zürich
7	MF	Martina Moser	9 April 1986 (aged 29)	105	16	(German Football Association) TSG Hoffenheim
8	MF	Cinzia Zehnder	4 August 1997 (aged 17)	6	0	(Swiss Football Association) FC Zürich
9	MF	Lia Wälti	19 April 1993 (aged 22)	42	3	(German Football Association) Turbine Potsdam
10	FW	Ramona Bachmann	25 December 1990 (aged 24)	61	33	(Swedish Football Association) FC Rosengård
11	MF	Lara Dickenmann	27 November 1985 (aged 29)	99	40	(French Football Federation) Olympique Lyon
12	GK	Stenia Michel	23 October 1987 (aged 27)	11	0	(German Football Association) USV Jena
13	FW	Ana-Maria Crnogorčević	3 October 1990 (aged 24)	69	35	(German Football Association) 1. FFC Frankfurt
14	DF	Rahel Kiwic	5 January 1991 (aged 24)	28	3	(German Football Association) MSV Duisburg
15	DF	Caroline Abbé (captain)	13 January 1988 (aged 27)	105	9	(German Football Association) Bayern Munich
16	FW	Fabienne Humm	20 December 1986 (aged 28)	35	10	(Swiss Football Association) FC Zürich
17	MF	Florijana Ismaili	1 January 1995 (aged 20)	10	0	(Swiss Football Association) BSC YB Frauen
18	MF	Vanessa Bürki	1 April 1986 (aged 29)	68	9	(German Football Association) Bayern Munich
19	FW	Eseosa Aigbogun	23 May 1993 (aged 22)	19	2	(Swiss Football Association) FC Basel
20	DF	Daniela Schwarz	9 September 1985 (aged 29)	23	1	(Norwegian Football Federation) Vålerenga
21	GK	Jennifer Oehrli	13 January 1989 (aged 26)	15	0	(Swiss Football Association) BSC YB Frauen
22	MF	Vanessa Bernauer	23 March 1988 (aged 27)	50	3	(German Football Association) VfL Wolfsburg
23	FW	Barla Deplazes	14 November 1995 (aged 19)	1	0	(Swiss Football Association) FC Zürich

== Group D ==
=== Australia ===
Head coach: Alen Stajcic

The final 23-player squad was announced on 12 May 2015.

No.	Pos.	Player	Date of birth (age)	Caps	Goals	Club
1	GK	Lydia Williams	13 May 1988 (aged 27)	46	0	(United States Soccer Federation) Washington Spirit
2	FW	Larissa Crummer	10 January 1996 (aged 19)	7	1	(Football Australia) Brisbane Roar
3	FW	Ashleigh Sykes	15 December 1991 (aged 23)	16	4	(Football Australia) Canberra United
4	DF	Clare Polkinghorne	1 February 1989 (aged 26)	79	5	(Football Australia) Brisbane Roar
5	DF	Laura Alleway	28 November 1989 (aged 25)	36	2	(Football Australia) Brisbane Roar
6	MF	Servet Uzunlar	8 March 1989 (aged 26)	49	2	(Football Australia) Sydney FC
7	DF	Steph Catley	26 January 1994 (aged 21)	39	2	(Football Australia) Melbourne Victory
8	MF	Elise Kellond-Knight	10 August 1990 (aged 24)	62	1	(Football Australia) Brisbane Roar
9	FW	Caitlin Foord	11 November 1994 (aged 20)	35	5	(Football Australia) Perth Glory
10	MF	Emily van Egmond	12 July 1993 (aged 21)	45	11	(Football Australia) Newcastle Jets
11	FW	Lisa De Vanna (captain)	14 November 1984 (aged 30)	104	37	(Football Australia) Melbourne Victory
12	FW	Leena Khamis	19 June 1986 (aged 28)	25	5	(Football Australia) Sydney FC
13	MF	Tameka Butt	16 June 1991 (aged 23)	49	6	(Football Australia) Brisbane Roar
14	MF	Alanna Kennedy	21 January 1995 (aged 20)	34	0	(Football Australia) Perth Glory
15	MF	Teresa Polias	16 May 1990 (aged 25)	10	0	(Football Australia) Sydney FC
16	FW	Hayley Raso	5 September 1994 (aged 20)	13	1	(Football Australia) Brisbane Roar
17	FW	Kyah Simon	25 June 1991 (aged 23)	57	14	(Football Australia) Sydney FC
18	GK	Melissa Barbieri	20 January 1980 (aged 35)	86	0	(Football Australia) Adelaide United
19	MF	Katrina Gorry	13 August 1992 (aged 22)	35	11	(Football Australia) Brisbane Roar
20	FW	Sam Kerr	10 September 1993 (aged 21)	42	7	(Football Australia) Perth Glory
21	GK	Mackenzie Arnold	25 February 1994 (aged 21)	7	0	(Football Australia) Perth Glory
22	MF	Nicola Bolger	3 March 1993 (aged 22)	6	0	(Football Australia) Sydney FC
23	FW	Michelle Heyman	4 July 1988 (aged 26)	40	15	(Football Australia) Canberra United

=== Nigeria ===
Head coach: Edwin Okon

A 26-player squad was announced on 19 May 2015. The final squad was named on 27 May 2015.

No.	Pos.	Player	Date of birth (age)	Caps	Goals	Club
1	GK	Precious Dede	18 January 1980 (aged 35)	96	0	(Nigeria Football Federation) Ibom Queens
2	DF	Blessing Edoho	5 September 1992 (aged 22)	4	1	(Nigeria Football Federation) Pelican Stars
3	DF	Osinachi Ohale	21 December 1991 (aged 23)	24	1	(Nigeria Football Federation) Rivers Angels
4	FW	Perpetua Nkwocha	3 January 1976 (aged 39)	98	80	(Swedish Football Association) Clemensnäs IF
5	DF	Onome Ebi	8 May 1983 (aged 32)	48	0	(Football Federation of Belarus) FC Minsk
6	DF	Josephine Chukwunonye	19 March 1992 (aged 23)	22	0	(Nigeria Football Federation) Rivers Angels
7	FW	Esther Sunday	13 March 1992 (aged 23)	23	5	(Football Federation of Belarus) FC Minsk
8	FW	Asisat Oshoala	9 October 1994 (aged 20)	14	10	(The Football Association) Liverpool
9	FW	Desire Oparanozie	17 December 1993 (aged 21)	32	22	(French Football Federation) Guingamp
10	FW	Courtney Dike	3 February 1995 (aged 20)	0	0	(United States Soccer Federation) Oklahoma State Univ.
11	FW	Ini-Abasi Umotong	15 May 1994 (aged 21)	0	0	(The Football Association) Portsmouth
12	MF	Halimatu Ayinde	16 May 1995 (aged 20)	9	0	(Nigeria Football Federation) Delta Queens
13	MF	Ngozi Okobi	14 December 1993 (aged 21)	22	2	(Nigeria Football Federation) Delta Queens
14	MF	Evelyn Nwabuoku (captain)	14 November 1985 (aged 29)	39	3	(Kazakhstan Football Federation) BIIK Kazygurt
15	DF	Ugo Njoku	27 November 1994 (aged 20)	6	0	(Nigeria Football Federation) Rivers Angels
16	GK	Ibubeleye Whyte	9 January 1992 (aged 23)	6	0	(Nigeria Football Federation) Rivers Angels
17	FW	Francisca Ordega	19 October 1993 (aged 21)	23	6	(United States Soccer Federation) Washington Spirit
18	FW	Loveth Ayila	6 September 1994 (aged 20)	3	0	(Nigeria Football Federation) Rivers Angels
19	MF	Martina Ohadugha	5 May 1991 (aged 24)	35	2	(Nigeria Football Federation) Rivers Angels
20	MF	Cecilia Nku	26 October 1992 (aged 22)	8	1	(Nigeria Football Federation) Rivers Angels
21	GK	Christy Ohiaeriaku	13 December 1996 (aged 18)	0	0	(Nigeria Football Federation) Rivers Angels
22	DF	Sarah Nnodim	25 December 1995 (aged 19)	1	0	(Nigeria Football Federation) Nasarawa Amazons
23	DF	Ngozi Ebere	5 August 1991 (aged 23)	17	1	(Nigeria Football Federation) Rivers Angels

=== Sweden ===
Head coach: Pia Sundhage

The final 23-player squad was announced on 11 May 2015.

No.	Pos.	Player	Date of birth (age)	Caps	Goals	Club
1	GK	Hedvig Lindahl	29 April 1983 (aged 32)	107	0	(The Football Association) Chelsea
2	DF	Charlotte Rohlin	2 December 1980 (aged 34)	77	7	(Swedish Football Association) Linköpings FC
3	DF	Linda Sembrant	15 May 1987 (aged 28)	55	4	(French Football Federation) Montpellier HSC
4	DF	Emma Berglund	19 December 1988 (aged 26)	35	0	(Swedish Football Association) FC Rosengård
5	DF	Nilla Fischer	2 August 1984 (aged 30)	130	19	(German Football Association) VfL Wolfsburg
6	DF	Sara Thunebro	26 April 1979 (aged 36)	131	5	(Swedish Football Association) Eskilstuna United
7	MF	Lisa Dahlkvist	6 February 1987 (aged 28)	95	9	(Swedish Football Association) KIF Örebro
8	FW	Lotta Schelin (co-captain)	27 February 1984 (aged 31)	149	80	(French Football Federation) Olympique Lyon
9	FW	Kosovare Asllani	29 July 1989 (aged 25)	76	21	(French Football Federation) Paris Saint-Germain
10	FW	Sofia Jakobsson	23 April 1990 (aged 25)	56	10	(French Football Federation) Montpellier HSC
11	FW	Jenny Hjohlman	13 February 1990 (aged 25)	12	1	(Swedish Football Association) Umeå IK
12	GK	Hilda Carlén	13 August 1991 (aged 23)	1	0	(Swedish Football Association) Piteå IF
13	MF	Malin Diaz	3 January 1994 (aged 21)	11	0	(Swedish Football Association) Eskilstuna United
14	DF	Amanda Ilestedt	17 January 1993 (aged 22)	6	1	(Swedish Football Association) FC Rosengård
15	MF	Therese Sjögran	8 April 1977 (aged 38)	209	21	(Swedish Football Association) FC Rosengård
16	DF	Lina Nilsson	17 June 1987 (aged 27)	64	3	(Swedish Football Association) FC Rosengård
17	MF	Caroline Seger (co-captain)	19 March 1985 (aged 30)	137	21	(French Football Federation) Paris Saint-Germain
18	DF	Jessica Samuelsson	30 January 1993 (aged 22)	21	0	(Swedish Football Association) Linköpings FC
19	FW	Emma Lundh	26 June 1989 (aged 25)	11	2	(Swedish Football Association) AIK Fotboll
20	MF	Emilia Appelqvist	11 February 1990 (aged 25)	4	0	(Swedish Football Association) Piteå IF
21	GK	Carola Söberg	29 July 1982 (aged 32)	11	0	(Swedish Football Association) KIF Örebro
22	MF	Olivia Schough	11 March 1991 (aged 24)	22	1	(Swedish Football Association) Eskilstuna United
23	DF	Elin Rubensson	11 May 1993 (aged 22)	18	0	(Swedish Football Association) Kopparbergs/Göteborg FC

=== United States ===
Head coach: Jill Ellis

The final 23-player squad was announced on 14 April 2015.

No.	Pos.	Player	Date of birth (age)	Caps	Goals	Club
1	GK	Hope Solo	30 July 1981 (aged 33)	170	0	(United States Soccer Federation) Seattle Reign
2	FW	Sydney Leroux	7 May 1990 (aged 25)	71	35	(United States Soccer Federation) Western New York Flash
3	DF	Christie Rampone (captain)	24 June 1975 (aged 39)	306	4	(United States Soccer Federation) Sky Blue
4	DF	Becky Sauerbrunn	6 June 1985 (aged 30)	81	0	(United States Soccer Federation) Kansas City
5	DF	Kelley O'Hara	4 August 1988 (aged 26)	60	0	(United States Soccer Federation) Sky Blue
6	DF	Whitney Engen	28 November 1987 (aged 27)	26	3	(United States Soccer Federation) Western New York Flash
7	MF	Shannon Boxx	29 June 1977 (aged 37)	190	27	(United States Soccer Federation) Chicago Red Stars
8	FW	Amy Rodriguez	17 February 1987 (aged 28)	123	29	(United States Soccer Federation) Kansas City
9	MF	Heather O'Reilly	2 January 1985 (aged 30)	219	41	(United States Soccer Federation) Kansas City
10	MF	Carli Lloyd	16 July 1982 (aged 32)	195	63	(United States Soccer Federation) Houston Dash
11	DF	Ali Krieger	28 July 1984 (aged 30)	66	1	(United States Soccer Federation) Washington Spirit
12	MF	Lauren Holiday	30 September 1987 (aged 27)	124	23	(United States Soccer Federation) Kansas City
13	FW	Alex Morgan	2 July 1989 (aged 25)	84	51	(United States Soccer Federation) Portland Thorns
14	MF	Morgan Brian	26 February 1993 (aged 22)	29	4	(United States Soccer Federation) Houston Dash
15	MF	Megan Rapinoe	5 July 1985 (aged 29)	102	29	(United States Soccer Federation) Seattle Reign
16	DF	Lori Chalupny	29 January 1984 (aged 31)	102	10	(United States Soccer Federation) Chicago Red Stars
17	MF	Tobin Heath	29 May 1988 (aged 27)	92	11	(United States Soccer Federation) Portland Thorns
18	GK	Ashlyn Harris	19 October 1985 (aged 29)	6	0	(United States Soccer Federation) Washington Spirit
19	DF	Julie Johnston	6 April 1992 (aged 23)	12	3	(United States Soccer Federation) Chicago Red Stars
20	FW	Abby Wambach	2 June 1980 (aged 35)	242	182	Unattached
21	GK	Alyssa Naeher	20 April 1988 (aged 27)	1	0	(United States Soccer Federation) Boston Breakers
22	DF	Meghan Klingenberg	2 August 1988 (aged 26)	34	2	(United States Soccer Federation) Houston Dash
23	FW	Christen Press	29 December 1988 (aged 26)	45	20	(United States Soccer Federation) Chicago Red Stars

== Group E ==
=== Brazil ===
Head coach: Vadão

The squad was announced on 25 May 2015. On the eve of the tournament, Rafinha was called in to replace Érika, who withdrew with a knee injury.

No.	Pos.	Player	Date of birth (age)	Caps	Goals	Club
1	GK	Luciana	24 July 1987 (aged 27)	33	0	(Brazilian Football Confederation) Ferroviária
2	DF	Fabiana	4 August 1989 (aged 25)	53	6	(Brazilian Football Confederation) Centro Olímpico
3	DF	Mônica Alves	21 April 1987 (aged 28)	21	0	(Brazilian Football Confederation) Ferroviária
4	FW	Rafinha Travalão	18 August 1988 (aged 26)	0	0	(United States Soccer Federation) Boston Breakers
5	MF	Andressinha	1 May 1995 (aged 20)	17	7	(Brazilian Football Confederation) Kindermann
6	DF	Tamires	10 October 1987 (aged 27)	31	3	(Brazilian Football Confederation) Centro Olímpico
7	FW	Bia Zaneratto	17 December 1993 (aged 21)	16	1	(Korea Football Association) Incheon Hyundai Steel Red Angels
8	MF	Thaísa Moreno	17 December 1988 (aged 26)	26	2	(Brazilian Football Confederation) Ferroviária
9	FW	Andressa Alves	10 November 1992 (aged 22)	36	9	(Brazilian Football Confederation) São José
10	FW	Marta (captain)	19 February 1986 (aged 29)	92	91	(Swedish Football Association) FC Rosengård
11	FW	Cristiane	15 May 1985 (aged 30)	106	74	(Brazilian Football Confederation) Centro Olímpico
12	GK	Bárbara	4 April 1988 (aged 27)	22	0	(Brazilian Football Confederation) Kindermann
13	DF	Poliana	6 February 1991 (aged 24)	32	2	(Brazilian Football Confederation) São José
14	DF	Géssica do Nascimento	19 March 1991 (aged 24)	0	0	(Brazilian Football Confederation) Ferroviária
15	DF	Tayla	9 May 1992 (aged 23)	31	1	(Brazilian Football Confederation) Ferroviária
16	DF	Rafaelle Souza	18 June 1991 (aged 23)	3	0	(Brazilian Football Confederation) São Francisco
17	FW	Rosana	7 July 1982 (aged 32)	111	17	(Brazilian Football Confederation) São José
18	FW	Raquel Fernandes	21 March 1991 (aged 24)	18	3	(Brazilian Football Confederation) Ferroviária
19	MF	Maurine	14 January 1986 (aged 29)	56	6	(Brazilian Football Confederation) Ferroviária
20	MF	Formiga	3 March 1978 (aged 37)	131	19	(Brazilian Football Confederation) São José
21	MF	Gabi Zanotti	28 February 1985 (aged 30)	20	2	(Brazilian Football Confederation) Centro Olímpico
22	FW	Darlene	11 January 1990 (aged 25)	31	4	(Brazilian Football Confederation) Centro Olímpico
23	GK	Letícia Izidoro	13 August 1994 (aged 20)	0	0	(Brazilian Football Confederation) São José

=== Costa Rica ===
Head coach: Amelia Valverde

The squad was announced on 20 May 2015.

No.	Pos.	Player	Date of birth (age)	Caps	Goals	Club
1	GK	Dinnia Díaz	14 January 1988 (aged 27)	21	0	(Costa Rican Football Federation) UD Moravia
2	DF	Gabriela Guillén	1 March 1992 (aged 23)	10	0	(Costa Rican Football Federation) Deportivo Saprissa
3	DF	Emilie Valenciano	15 February 1997 (aged 18)	4	0	(Costa Rican Football Federation) L.D. Alajuelense
4	DF	Mariana Benavides	26 December 1994 (aged 20)	12	4	(Costa Rican Football Federation) C.S. Herediano
5	DF	Diana Sáenz	15 April 1989 (aged 26)	48	0	(United States Soccer Federation) Univ. of South Florida
6	DF	Carol Sánchez	16 April 1986 (aged 29)	33	2	(Costa Rican Football Federation) UD Moravia
7	FW	Melissa Herrera	10 October 1996 (aged 18)	20	12	(Costa Rican Football Federation) Deportivo Saprissa
8	DF	Daniela Cruz	8 March 1991 (aged 24)	33	6	(Costa Rican Football Federation) Deportivo Saprissa
9	FW	Carolina Venegas	28 September 1991 (aged 23)	35	15	(Costa Rican Football Federation) Deportivo Saprissa
10	MF	Shirley Cruz (captain)	28 August 1985 (aged 29)	60	21	(French Football Federation) Paris Saint-Germain
11	FW	Raquel Rodríguez	28 October 1993 (aged 21)	37	24	(United States Soccer Federation) Penn State Univ.
12	DF	Lixy Rodríguez	4 November 1990 (aged 24)	47	2	(Costa Rican Football Federation) L.D. Alajuelense
13	GK	Noelia Bermúdez	20 September 1994 (aged 20)	1	0	(Costa Rican Football Federation) Deportivo Saprissa
14	FW	María Barrantes	12 April 1989 (aged 26)	20	21	(Costa Rican Football Federation) UD Moravia
15	MF	Cristín Granados	19 August 1989 (aged 25)	53	10	(Costa Rican Football Federation) Deportivo Saprissa
16	MF	Katherine Alvarado	11 April 1991 (aged 24)	47	18	(Costa Rican Football Federation) Deportivo Saprissa
17	FW	Karla Villalobos	16 July 1986 (aged 28)	6	3	(Costa Rican Football Federation) C.S. Herediano
18	GK	Yirlania Arroyo	28 May 1986 (aged 29)	40	0	(United States Soccer Federation) Sky Blue FC
19	DF	Fabiola Sánchez	9 April 1993 (aged 22)	10	3	(United States Soccer Federation) Martin Methodist College
20	FW	Wendy Acosta	19 December 1989 (aged 25)	38	18	(Costa Rican Football Federation) UD Moravia
21	FW	Adriana Venegas	12 June 1989 (aged 25)	10	5	(Costa Rican Football Federation) C.S. Herediano
22	DF	María Coto	2 March 1998 (aged 17)	3	0	(Costa Rican Football Federation) L.D. Alajuelense
23	MF	Gloriana Villalobos	20 August 1999 (aged 15)	12	2	(Costa Rican Football Federation) Deportivo Saprissa

=== South Korea ===
Head coach: Yoon Deok-yeo

A 23-player squad was announced on 30 April 2015.

No.	Pos.	Player	Date of birth (age)	Caps	Goals	Club
1	GK	Jun Min-kyung	16 January 1985 (aged 30)	45	0	(Korea Football Association) Icheon Daekyo
2	DF	Lee Eun-mi	18 August 1988 (aged 26)	60	12	(Korea Football Association) Icheon Daekyo
3	DF	Lim Seon-joo	27 November 1990 (aged 24)	44	2	(Korea Football Association) Incheon Hyundai Steel Red Angels
4	DF	Shim Seo-yeon	15 April 1989 (aged 26)	48	0	(Korea Football Association) Icheon Daekyo
5	DF	Kim Do-yeon	7 December 1988 (aged 26)	60	1	(Korea Football Association) Incheon Hyundai Steel Red Angels
6	DF	Hwang Bo-ram	10 June 1987 (aged 27)	32	0	(Korea Football Association) Icheon Daekyo
7	FW	Jeon Ga-eul	14 September 1988 (aged 26)	67	32	(Korea Football Association) Incheon Hyundai Steel Red Angels
8	MF	Cho So-hyun (captain)	24 June 1988 (aged 26)	78	9	(Korea Football Association) Incheon Hyundai Steel Red Angels
9	FW	Park Eun-sun	25 December 1986 (aged 28)	32	18	(Russian Football Union) WFC Rossiyanka
10	MF	Ji So-yun	21 February 1991 (aged 24)	74	38	(The Football Association) Chelsea
11	FW	Jung Seol-bin	1 June 1990 (aged 25)	40	11	(Korea Football Association) Incheon Hyundai Steel Red Angels
12	FW	Yoo Young-a	15 April 1988 (aged 27)	63	28	(Korea Football Association) Incheon Hyundai Steel Red Angels
13	MF	Kwon Hah-nul	7 March 1988 (aged 27)	94	15	(Korea Football Association) Busan Sangmu
14	DF	Song Su-ran	7 September 1990 (aged 24)	20	1	(Korea Football Association) Daejeon Sportstoto
15	MF	Park Hee-young	21 March 1991 (aged 24)	38	8	(Korea Football Association) Daejeon Sportstoto
16	FW	Kang Yu-mi	5 October 1991 (aged 23)	2	0	(Korea Football Association) Hwacheon KSPO
17	DF	Kim Hye-yeong	26 February 1995 (aged 20)	7	1	(Korea Football Association) Icheon Daekyo
18	GK	Kim Jung-mi	16 October 1984 (aged 30)	89	0	(Korea Football Association) Incheon Hyundai Steel Red Angels
19	DF	Kim Soo-yun	30 August 1989 (aged 25)	43	9	(Korea Football Association) Hwacheon KSPO
20	DF	Kim Hye-ri	25 June 1990 (aged 24)	45	1	(Korea Football Association) Incheon Hyundai Steel Red Angels
21	GK	Yoon Young-geul	28 October 1987 (aged 27)	1	0	(Korea Football Association) Suwon FMC
22	MF	Lee So-dam	12 October 1994 (aged 20)	17	1	(Korea Football Association) Daejeon Sportstoto
23	FW	Lee Geum-min	7 April 1994 (aged 21)	6	1	(Korea Football Association) Seoul

=== Spain ===
Head coach: Ignacio Quereda

The final 23-player squad was announced on 11 May 2015.

No.	Pos.	Player	Date of birth (age)	Caps	Goals	Club
1	GK	Ainhoa Tirapu	4 September 1984 (aged 30)	43	0	(Royal Spanish Football Federation) Athletic Bilbao
2	DF	Celia Jiménez	20 June 1995 (aged 19)	3	0	(United States Soccer Federation) Univ. of Alabama
3	DF	Leire Landa	19 December 1986 (aged 28)	20	0	(Royal Spanish Football Federation) FC Barcelona
4	DF	Melanie Serrano	12 October 1989 (aged 25)	9	0	(Royal Spanish Football Federation) FC Barcelona
5	DF	Ruth García	26 April 1987 (aged 28)	45	2	(Royal Spanish Football Federation) FC Barcelona
6	MF	Virginia Torrecilla	4 September 1994 (aged 20)	13	0	(Royal Spanish Football Federation) FC Barcelona
7	FW	Natalia Pablos	15 October 1985 (aged 29)	17	12	(The Football Association) Arsenal
8	FW	Sonia Bermúdez	18 November 1984 (aged 30)	50	28	(Royal Spanish Football Federation) FC Barcelona
9	FW	Verónica Boquete (captain)	9 April 1987 (aged 28)	46	29	(German Football Association) 1. FFC Frankfurt
10	MF	Jennifer Hermoso	9 May 1990 (aged 25)	24	11	(Royal Spanish Football Federation) FC Barcelona
11	FW	Priscila Borja	28 April 1985 (aged 30)	22	6	(Royal Spanish Football Federation) Atlético Madrid
12	MF	Marta Corredera	8 August 1991 (aged 23)	25	2	(Royal Spanish Football Federation) FC Barcelona
13	GK	Lola Gallardo	10 June 1993 (aged 21)	7	0	(Royal Spanish Football Federation) Atlético Madrid
14	MF	Vicky Losada	5 March 1991 (aged 24)	22	3	(The Football Association) Arsenal
15	MF	Silvia Meseguer	12 March 1989 (aged 26)	35	3	(Royal Spanish Football Federation) Atlético Madrid
16	DF	Ivana Andrés	1 July 1994 (aged 20)	1	0	(Royal Spanish Football Federation) Valencia CF
17	MF	Elisabeth Ibarra	29 June 1981 (aged 33)	42	2	(Royal Spanish Football Federation) Athletic Bilbao
18	DF	Marta Torrejón	27 February 1990 (aged 25)	48	7	(Royal Spanish Football Federation) FC Barcelona
19	FW	Erika Vázquez	16 February 1983 (aged 32)	45	7	(Royal Spanish Football Federation) Athletic Bilbao
20	DF	Irene Paredes	4 July 1991 (aged 23)	22	1	(Royal Spanish Football Federation) Athletic Bilbao
21	MF	Alexia Putellas	4 February 1994 (aged 21)	19	3	(Royal Spanish Football Federation) FC Barcelona
22	MF	Amanda Sampedro	26 June 1993 (aged 21)	4	0	(Royal Spanish Football Federation) Atlético Madrid
23	GK	Sandra Paños	4 November 1992 (aged 22)	3	0	(Royal Spanish Football Federation) Levante UD

== Group F ==
=== Colombia ===
Head coach: Fabián Taborda

A 25-player squad was announced on 1 May 2015. The final roster was revealed on 20 May 2015. On 2 June 2015, Lina Granados was called up to replace the injured Melissa Ortiz.

No.	Pos.	Player	Date of birth (age)	Caps	Goals	Club
1	GK	Stefany Castaño	11 January 1994 (aged 21)	7	0	(United States Soccer Federation) Graceland Univ.
2	DF	Carolina Arbeláez	8 March 1995 (aged 20)	1	0	(Colombian Football Federation) Formas Íntimas
3	MF	Natalia Gaitán (captain)	3 April 1991 (aged 24)	35	4	(United States Soccer Federation) CD Gol Star
4	FW	Diana Ospina	3 March 1989 (aged 26)	29	3	(Colombian Football Federation) Formas Íntimas
5	DF	Lina Granados	19 May 1994 (aged 21)	0	0	(United States Soccer Federation) Vanderbilt University
6	MF	Daniela Montoya	22 August 1990 (aged 24)	32	2	(Colombian Football Federation) Formas Íntimas
7	FW	Ingrid Vidal	22 April 1991 (aged 24)	50	11	(Colombian Football Federation) CD Palmiranas
8	MF	Mildrey Pineda	1 October 1989 (aged 25)	25	2	(Colombian Football Federation) CD Palmiranas
9	DF	Oriánica Velásquez	1 August 1989 (aged 25)	37	2	(Colombian Football Federation) CD Gol Star
10	FW	Yoreli Rincón	27 July 1993 (aged 21)	45	9	(Italian Football Federation) Torres Calcio
11	FW	Catalina Usme	25 December 1989 (aged 25)	40	19	(Colombian Football Federation) Formas Íntimas
12	GK	Sandra Sepúlveda	3 March 1988 (aged 27)	37	0	(Colombian Football Federation) Formas Íntimas
13	DF	Ángela Clavijo	1 September 1993 (aged 21)	15	0	(Colombian Football Federation) Club Kamatsa
14	DF	Nataly Arias	2 April 1986 (aged 29)	43	6	(United States Soccer Federation) Atlanta Silverbacks
15	FW	Tatiana Ariza	21 February 1991 (aged 24)	35	8	(Colombian Football Federation) CD Gol Star
16	MF	Lady Andrade	10 January 1992 (aged 23)	41	7	(Colombian Football Federation) CD Palmiranas
17	DF	Carolina Arias	2 September 1990 (aged 24)	38	0	(Colombian Football Federation) CD Palmiranas
18	FW	Yisela Cuesta	27 September 1991 (aged 23)	4	1	(Colombian Football Federation) Formas Íntimas
19	MF	Leicy Santos	16 May 1996 (aged 19)	13	2	(Colombian Football Federation) Club Besser
20	FW	Laura Cosme	5 March 1992 (aged 23)	5	1	(Colombian Football Federation) CD Palmiranas
21	MF	Isabella Echeverri	16 June 1994 (aged 20)	14	1	(United States Soccer Federation) Univ. of Toledo
22	GK	Catalina Pérez	8 November 1994 (aged 20)	4	0	(United States Soccer Federation) Univ. of Miami
23	FW	Manuela González	29 August 1995 (aged 19)	1	0	(Colombian Football Federation) CD Palmiranas

=== England ===
Head coach: (Wales) Mark Sampson

The squad was announced on 11 May 2015.

No.	Pos.	Player	Date of birth (age)	Caps	Goals	Club
1	GK	Karen Bardsley	14 October 1984 (aged 30)	43	0	(The Football Association) Manchester City
2	DF	Alex Scott	14 October 1984 (aged 30)	123	12	(The Football Association) Arsenal
3	DF	Claire Rafferty	11 January 1989 (aged 26)	9	0	(The Football Association) Chelsea
4	MF	Fara Williams	25 January 1984 (aged 31)	139	37	(The Football Association) Liverpool
5	DF	Steph Houghton (captain)	23 April 1988 (aged 27)	53	7	(The Football Association) Manchester City
6	DF	Laura Bassett	2 August 1983 (aged 31)	49	2	(The Football Association) Notts County
7	MF	Jordan Nobbs	8 December 1992 (aged 22)	21	3	(The Football Association) Arsenal
8	MF	Jill Scott	2 February 1987 (aged 28)	90	13	(The Football Association) Manchester City
9	FW	Eniola Aluko	21 February 1987 (aged 28)	90	32	(The Football Association) Chelsea
10	MF	Karen Carney	1 August 1987 (aged 27)	103	23	(The Football Association) Birmingham City
11	MF	Jade Moore	22 October 1990 (aged 24)	16	1	(The Football Association) Birmingham City
12	DF	Lucy Bronze	28 October 1991 (aged 23)	16	2	(The Football Association) Manchester City
13	GK	Siobhan Chamberlain	15 August 1983 (aged 31)	33	0	(The Football Association) Arsenal
14	DF	Alex Greenwood	7 September 1993 (aged 21)	12	1	(The Football Association) Notts County
15	DF	Casey Stoney	13 May 1982 (aged 33)	118	6	(The Football Association) Arsenal
16	MF	Katie Chapman	15 June 1982 (aged 32)	85	8	(The Football Association) Chelsea
17	MF	Jo Potter	13 November 1984 (aged 30)	19	2	(The Football Association) Birmingham City
18	FW	Toni Duggan	25 July 1991 (aged 23)	25	14	(The Football Association) Manchester City
19	FW	Jodie Taylor	17 May 1986 (aged 29)	8	4	(United States Soccer Federation) Portland Thorns
20	FW	Lianne Sanderson	3 February 1988 (aged 27)	46	15	(United States Soccer Federation) Portland Thorns
21	GK	Carly Telford	7 July 1987 (aged 27)	5	0	(The Football Association) Notts County
22	FW	Fran Kirby	29 June 1993 (aged 21)	8	2	(The Football Association) Chelsea
23	FW	Ellen White	9 May 1989 (aged 26)	50	17	(The Football Association) Notts County

=== France ===
Head coach: Philippe Bergeroo

The final 23-player squad on 23 April 2015.

No.	Pos.	Player	Date of birth (age)	Caps	Goals	Club
1	GK	Céline Deville	24 January 1982 (aged 33)	65	0	(French Football Federation) FCF Juvisy
2	DF	Wendie Renard (captain)	20 July 1990 (aged 24)	65	16	(French Football Federation) Olympique Lyon
3	DF	Laure Boulleau	22 October 1986 (aged 28)	57	0	(French Football Federation) Paris Saint-Germain
4	DF	Laura Georges	20 August 1984 (aged 30)	158	6	(French Football Federation) Paris Saint-Germain
5	DF	Sabrina Delannoy	18 May 1986 (aged 29)	25	2	(French Football Federation) Paris Saint-Germain
6	MF	Amandine Henry	28 September 1989 (aged 25)	39	3	(French Football Federation) Olympique Lyon
7	MF	Kenza Dali	31 July 1991 (aged 23)	11	2	(French Football Federation) Paris Saint-Germain
8	DF	Jessica Houara	29 September 1987 (aged 27)	32	1	(French Football Federation) Paris Saint-Germain
9	FW	Eugénie Le Sommer	18 May 1989 (aged 26)	104	44	(French Football Federation) Olympique Lyon
10	MF	Camille Abily	5 December 1984 (aged 30)	145	29	(French Football Federation) Olympique Lyon
11	MF	Claire Lavogez	18 June 1994 (aged 20)	9	1	(French Football Federation) Montpellier HSC
12	MF	Élodie Thomis	13 August 1986 (aged 28)	116	31	(French Football Federation) Olympique Lyon
13	FW	Kadidiatou Diani	1 April 1995 (aged 20)	5	1	(French Football Federation) FCF Juvisy
14	MF	Louisa Nécib	23 January 1987 (aged 28)	125	32	(French Football Federation) Olympique Lyon
15	MF	Élise Bussaglia	24 September 1985 (aged 29)	143	26	(French Football Federation) Olympique Lyon
16	GK	Sarah Bouhaddi	17 October 1986 (aged 28)	93	0	(French Football Federation) Olympique Lyon
17	FW	Gaëtane Thiney	28 October 1985 (aged 29)	122	55	(French Football Federation) FCF Juvisy
18	FW	Marie-Laure Delie	29 January 1988 (aged 27)	85	57	(French Football Federation) Paris Saint-Germain
19	DF	Griedge Mbock Bathy	26 February 1995 (aged 20)	9	0	(French Football Federation) EA Guingamp
20	DF	Annaïg Butel	15 February 1992 (aged 23)	8	0	(French Football Federation) FCF Juvisy
21	GK	Méline Gérard	30 May 1990 (aged 25)	1	0	(French Football Federation) Olympique Lyon
22	DF	Amel Majri	25 January 1993 (aged 22)	7	1	(French Football Federation) Olympique Lyon
23	MF	Kheira Hamraoui	13 January 1990 (aged 25)	15	0	(French Football Federation) Paris Saint-Germain

=== Mexico ===
Head coach: Leonardo Cuéllar

A 24-player squad was announced on 11 May 2015. The final roster was published on 20 May 2015.

No.	Pos.	Player	Date of birth (age)	Caps	Goals	Club
1	GK	Cecilia Santiago	19 October 1994 (aged 20)	39	0	Unattached
2	DF	Kenti Robles	15 February 1991 (aged 24)	40	0	(Royal Spanish Football Federation) RCD Espanyol
3	DF	Christina Murillo	28 January 1993 (aged 22)	22	0	(United States Soccer Federation) Univ. of Michigan
4	DF	Alina Garciamendez	16 April 1991 (aged 24)	46	1	Unattached
5	DF	Valeria Miranda	18 August 1992 (aged 22)	12	0	(Mexican Football Federation) Pumas UNAM
6	MF	Jenny Ruiz	9 August 1983 (aged 31)	31	4	Unattached
7	MF	Nayeli Rangel (captain)	28 February 1992 (aged 23)	67	6	Unattached
8	MF	Teresa Noyola	15 April 1990 (aged 25)	38	3	(United States Soccer Federation) Houston Dash
9	FW	Charlyn Corral	11 September 1991 (aged 23)	28	15	(Football Association of Finland) Merilappi United
10	MF	Stephany Mayor	23 September 1991 (aged 23)	50	10	(Mexican Football Federation) UDLA Puebla
11	FW	Mónica Ocampo	4 January 1987 (aged 28)	73	14	(United States Soccer Federation) Sky Blue FC
12	GK	Pamela Tajonar	2 December 1984 (aged 30)	37	0	(Royal Spanish Football Federation) Sevilla FC
13	DF	Greta Espinoza	5 June 1995 (aged 20)	11	0	(United States Soccer Federation) Arizona Strikers
14	DF	Arianna Romero	29 July 1992 (aged 22)	29	1	(United States Soccer Federation) Washington Spirit
15	DF	Bianca Sierra	25 June 1992 (aged 22)	30	0	(United States Soccer Federation) Boston Breakers
16	MF	Mónica Alvarado	11 January 1991 (aged 24)	20	0	(United States Soccer Federation) Texas Christian Univ.
17	MF	Verónica Pérez	18 May 1988 (aged 27)	73	8	(United States Soccer Federation) Washington Spirit
18	MF	Amanda Pérez	31 July 1994 (aged 20)	4	0	(United States Soccer Federation) Univ. of Washington
19	FW	Renae Cuéllar	24 June 1990 (aged 24)	26	7	(United States Soccer Federation) Washington Spirit
20	MF	María Sánchez	20 February 1996 (aged 19)	0	0	Unattached
21	FW	Anisa Guajardo	10 March 1991 (aged 24)	13	4	(Football Australia) Heidelberg United
22	MF	Fabiola Ibarra	2 February 1994 (aged 21)	3	0	(Mexican Football Federation) Club Tijuana
23	GK	Emily Alvarado	9 June 1998 (aged 16)	0	0	(United States Soccer Federation) Texas Rush
