= Doumerc =

Doumerc is a surname. Notable people with the surname include:

- Beatriz Doumerc (1929–2014), Argentine writer
- Jean-Pierre Doumerc (1767–1847), French general
