= Salomon Isacovici =

Ecuadorian businessman and Holocaust survivor (1924–1998)

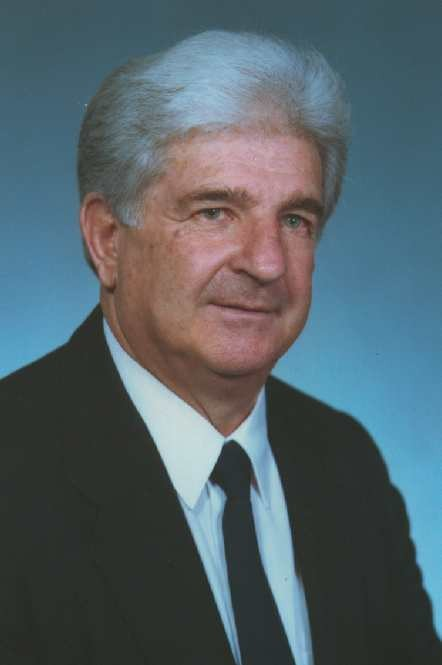
- Born: 1924; Sighetu Marmaţiei, Romania
- Died: February 1998 (aged 73–74); Ecuador
- Occupations: Businessman, writer

Salomon Isacovici (1924 – February 1998) was a Romanian-born Ecuadorian Jewish Holocaust survivor who became a writer and businessman in Ecuador. Born in Romania, he moved to Ecuador following World War II, and co-authored with Juan Manuel Rodriguez the book Man of Ashes.

== Personal life ==
Isacovici grew up in Sighetu Marmaţiei on his parents' farm. In 1944 he was interned at the Auschwitz concentration camp, is both the Auschwitz I and Auschwitz II-Birkenau camps. He escaped during a massacre, was shot, recaptured and sent to the Gross-Rosen concentration camp. He remained there until U.S. soldiers liberated the camp.

At the end of the war, he returned to his original home only to find another family in residence. He joined a Zionist group and considered emigrating to Palestine. Instead, in 1948, he followed his sweetheart to Ecuador, and beginning with menial jobs, rose to become a successful businessman. He was deeply concerned that the treatment of Ecuadorian indigenous peoples by the Spanish was comparable to those in the concentration camps of Nazi Germany.

== Man of Ashes ==
A book co-authored by Isacovici and Juan Manuel Rodriguez was published in Mexico in 1990 as A7393: Hombre de Cenizas. The book recounted Isacovici's youth in Romania, his years in Nazi Germany, and his eventual emigration to Ecuador. It was described by its publisher as a "cruel and truthful testimony of the Nazi concentration camps". The book was awarded the Fernando Jeno literary prize by Mexico's Jewish community in 1991.

In 1995, the University of Nebraska Press planned to an English-language version, with a translation by Dick Gerdes, a professor at George Mason University in Virginia. The university press described the book as important to Holocaust studies as a rare account of a Romanian and Latin American Jew. However, its publication was delayed by a dispute about the book's principal authorship and status as a novel or autobiography. Isacovici asserted that the book was his memoir, and that he had hired Rodriguez to improve the Spanish text. Rodriguez threatened legal action, stating that the book was fictionalized, incorporated some of his own memories, and argued he was the main author and should be credited as such. The controversy has been critiqued as an example of literary usurpation and as an attempt to cast doubt on a Holocaust survivor's experience.

The English translation was published in 1999 with Isacovici and Rodriguez listed as co-authors.

== Works ==
- Isacovici, Salomon; Rodríguez, Juan Manuel (1999). Man of Ashes.
- Isacovici, Salomon; Rodríguez, Juan Manuel (1990). A7393: Hombre de Cenizas.

== Death ==
Isacovici died of cancer in February 1998, a year before the publication of the English translation of Man of Ashes.
