= Cushla =

Cushla is a feminine given name. Notable people with the name include:

- Cushla Lichtwark (born 1980), New Zealand netball and football player
- Cushla Tangaere-Manuel (fl. 2009), New Zealand politician
