= Lichtwark =

Lichtwark is a German surname. Notable people with the surname include:

- Alfred Lichtwark (1852–1914), German art historian, museum director, and art educator
- Cushla Lichtwark (born 1980), New Zealand netball player
