= Piotr Orzechowski =

Polish jazz pianist and composer

Piotr Orzechowski Pianohooligan
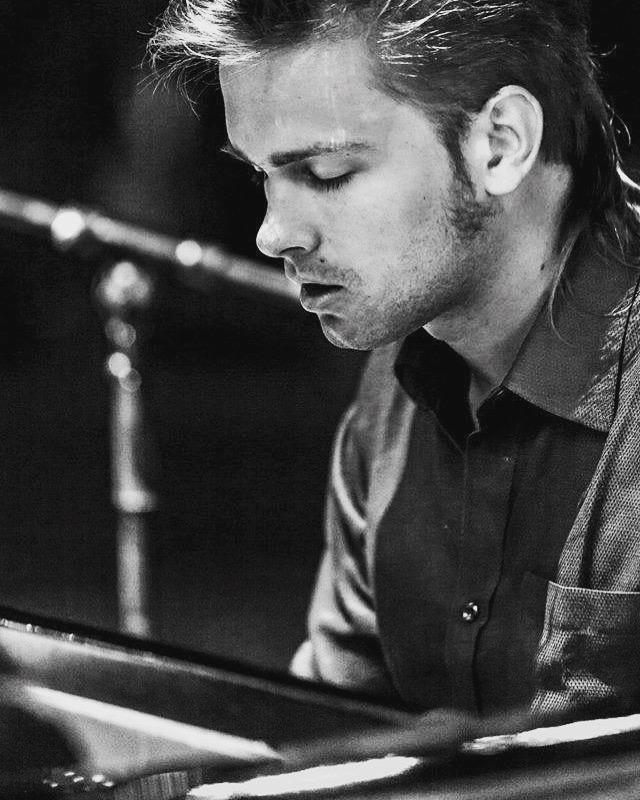
- Piotr Orzechowski, New Delhi, India 2014

Background information
- Also known as: Pianohooligan
- Born: Piotr Orzechowski; 31 December 1990 (age 35); Kraków, Poland
- Genres: Jazz
- Occupation: Musician
- Instrument: Piano
- Labels: Universal Music Poland, Decca Classics
- Website: www.pianohooligan.com

Piotr Orzechowski (Polish pronunciation: [pjɔtr ɔʐɛˈxɔfskʲi]; born 31 December 1990, Kraków), also known by his stage name Pianohooligan, is a Polish jazz pianist and composer. He is a graduate of the Berklee College of Music in Valencia and a winner of the Montreux Jazz Piano Competition and Jazz Hoeilaart, hailed by the critics as "the most creative and uncompromising young Polish jazz artist."

== Biography ==
He was born in Kraków, Poland. In parallel with his regular classical education, he was multiply awarded at different international jazz competitions such as "Jazz Juniors", "Jazz nad Odrą" or "Krokus Jazz". Since his win at Montreux Jazz Solo Piano Competition 2011 in Switzerland, where he was awarded the 1st prize, he has been touring all over the world. He performs successfully within the realms of classical and improvised music, often blurring the boundaries between genres.

This trait is also manifested on his solo debut album Experiment: Penderecki (Decca/Universal, 2012), which was an attempt to explore the core of the style developed by the Polish composer by converting Krzysztof Penderecki's orchestral structures into solo piano. This was the first instrumental album from Poland recorded on prestigious London label Decca. Similarly his second solo album, 15 Studies for the Oberek (Decca/Universal, 2014) – a musical analysis of the various elements of the Polish oberek dance – stylistically remains suspended between folk music, contemporary music and jazz.

He is the leader of High Definition Quartet. The ensemble's debut Hopasa (EmArcy Records/Universal, 2013) is comprising the pianist's own compositions, as well as Bucolics (ForTune, 2015), presenting Orzechowski's original arrangements of music by Witold Lutosławski, which soon after its premiere won a place on Jazz Forum magazine's prestigious list of the best Polish albums of all time.

Apart from his solo activity as a jazz pianist, he also performs with leading Polish orchestras such as the Sinfonia Varsovia, the Polish National Radio Symphony Orchestra in Katowice, the AUKSO Chamber Orchestra, and the Polish Radio Symphony Orchestra. With Marcin Masecki and the Capella Cracoviensis, he recorded an album entitled Bach Rewrite (Decca/Universal, 2013) featuring J.S. Bach's harpsichord concertos performed on a Rhodes electroacoustic piano.

The artist has collaborated with such prominent contemporary music composers as Philip Glass, Steve Reich, and Krzysztof Penderecki. He has toured with highly esteemed jazz musicians, including Randy Brecker, Avishai Cohen, Victor Mendoza, and Michał Urbaniak. He has also contributed to the projects of such great figures in the world of music as Adrian Utley of Portishead, Carlos Zíngaro, Agata Zubel, Skalpel, William Basinski, Fennesz, and Krzysztof Knittel.

In 2017 he has released his third solo piano double-album '24 Preludes & Improvisations' (Decca/Universal). This monumental work, alluding in its form to Johann Sebastian Bach's 24 Preludes and Fugues, by using as examples short musical structures (Preludes), and equally short but far more complex improvisational creations (Improvisations), artist intends to expound a new way of understanding the notion of jazz and self-expression in music.

== Discography ==
Solo piano

Year	Album	Record label		
2012	Experiment: Penderecki	Decca Classics	–	–
2014	15 Studies For The Oberek	Decca Classics	–	–
2017	24 Preludes & Improvisations	Decca Classics	–	–
2024	Critique of Swing in Two Parts	Pianohooligan	–	–

with High Definition Quartet

Year	Album	Record label		
2013	Hopasa	EmArcy Records	–	–
2015	Bukoliki	For Tune	–	–
2019	Dziady	Polish Music Publishing House	–	–

Collaborations

Year	Album	Record label		
2013	Bach Rewrite (with Marcin Masecki & Capella Cracoviensis)	Decca Classics	–	–
2014	Weird Glitches (with Stephen McHale)	Stephen McHale Music	–	–
2014	Elapse (with Daniel Toledo Trio)	Universidad San Francisco de Quito	–	–
2016	PIANO.PL (with Dorota Miśkiewicz)	Universal Music Polska	–	–
2016	H. M. Górecki. Concerto for harpsichord and string orchestra (with Polish National Radio Symphony Orchestra)	Polish National Radio Symphony Orchestra	–	–
2017	H. Wars. Symphonic Works (with Polish Radio Symphony Orchestra)	Polish Radio	–	–
2019	Works for Rhodes Piano & Strings (with Aukso Chamber Orchestra)	Polish Music Publishing House	–	–
2022	Themes of Dracula (with Kuba Więcek)	Polish Music Publishing House	–	–

== See also ==
- Music of Poland
- List of Poles
