= Josef Strobl (geographer) =

Austrian geographer

Josef Strobl is an Austrian geographer. He is a professor at the University of Salzburg and leads its Centre for Geoinformatics and the GIScience Institute. Strobl was key to the implementation of the worldwide UNIGIS postgraduate distance learning programme. He leads the annual AGIT and GI_Forum symposia in Salzburg.

== Education ==
- Habilitation, Geography, University of Salzburg, Salzburg, Austria, 1993
- Doctor of Science (Dr.rer.nat.), Geography, University of Vienna, Austria, 1984
- Master of Science (Mag.rer.nat.), Geography, University of Vienna, Austria, 1982
