= Nattaya Duanjanthuek =

Thai footballer (born 1991)

Personal information
- Date of birth: 9 June 1991 (age 35)
- Place of birth: Thailand
- Height: 1.66 m (5 ft 5 in)
- Position: Midfielder

Team information
- Current team: BG Bundit Asia

Senior career*
Years	Team	Apps	(Gls)
- BG Bundit Asia

International career
	Thailand	1+	
- * Club domestic league appearances and goals

Nattaya Duanjanthuek (Thai: นาตยา ดวนจันทึก; born 9 June 1991) is a Thai footballer who plays as a midfielder for BG Bundit Asia and the Thailand women's national team.

== Career ==
Duanjanthuek has appeared for the Thailand women's national team, including at the 2015 AFF Women's Championship in Vietnam, where she appeared in a match against Laos on 5 May 2015, which finished as a 12–0 win. She was subsequently included in Thailand's squad for the 2015 FIFA Women's World Cup in Canada.
