= Abel Sierra Madero =

Cuban author

- Born: 1976 (age 49–50); Matanzas, Cuba
- Education: University of Havana; New York University
- Occupations: Author and Scholar
- Writing career
- Genre: Essay
- Notable works: La nación sexuada (2001); Del otro lado del espejo: La sexualidad en la construcción de la nación cubana. (2006); Fidel Castro. El comandante Playboy. Sexo, revolución y guerra fría. (2019); El cuerpo nunca olvida: Trabajo forzado, hombre nuevo y memoria en Cuba (1959-1980). (2022)
- Notable awards: Casa de las Américas Prize (2006) Martin Duberman (CUNY 2012)
- Website: abelsierramadero.com

Abel Sierra Madero (born in Matanzas, 1976) is a Cuban author and scholar who was awarded the Casa de las Américas Prize in 2006.

He holds a PhD in History from the University of Havana (2009) and second PhD in Literature from New York University (2019). His work has contributed with a transdisciplinary approach to the field of History of Sexuality. According to the historian Louis A. Pérez, "an original contribution to the historiography of Cuba is found in Abel Sierra Madero, Del otro lado del espejo: la sexualidad en la construcción de la nación cubana. Additionally, his work is taught in courses about Latin America and Cultural Studies in universities in the United States. Abel Sierra Madero has also been invited to deliver lectures in universities such as, Princeton, Harvard, Columbia, NYU and many others.

Aside from the Casa de las Américas Prize, he has received various awards and fellowships, including The Martin Duberman (CLAGS, CUNY); Research Fellowship, International Association for the Study of Sexuality, Culture and Society (IASSCS)/Ford Foundation; ERASMUS (European Community); Research Fellowship "Sexualities, Masculinities and Modernities", Ford Foundation/South-South Exchange Program for Research on the History of Development (SEPHIS); and "Catauro Cubano", Cuban Book Institute Award for his contribution to the Social Sciences in Cuba.

Sierra Madero has contributed with several magazines, journals, and newspapers such as Letras Libres, Cuban Studies, The Rumpus, Diario de Cuba, El Nuevo Herald, Hypermedia Magazine among others.

== Awards and fellowships ==
- 2001 "Pinos Nuevos", Cuban Book Institute Award to the book: La nación sexuada. Relaciones de género y sexo en Cuba durante la primera mitad del siglo XIX [The sexed nation. Gender & sex relations, in Cuba during the first half of 19th Century].
- 2001 "Razón de Ser" Award, Alejo Carpentier Foundation, for the project: "Relaciones de género y sexo en Cuba durante las guerras de independencia" [Gender and sex relations during the Cuban independence wars], Havana, Cuba.
- 2006 Casa de las Américas Book Award for Del otro lado del espejo. La sexualidad en la construcción de la nación cubana.
- 2007 "Catauro Cubano", Cuban Book Institute Award to the book Del otro lado del espejo. La sexualidad en la construcción de la nación cubana, for its contribution to the Social Sciences in Cuba.
- 2009 Fellowship "Sexualities, masculinities and modernities". Ford Foundation/South-South Exchange Program for Research on the History of Development (SEPHIS).
- 2011 Erasmus Mundus (European Community).
- 2012 The Martin Duberman Fellowship, Center for Lesbian and Gay Studies, CUNY.

== Books ==
- 2001 La nación sexuada. Relaciones de género en Cuba durante la primera mitad del siglo XIX (The Sexed Nation. Gender relations in Cuba during the first half of the 19th Century), Havana, Ciencias Sociales.
- 2006 Del otro lado del espejo: La sexualidad en la construcción de la nación cubana (On the other side of de mirror. Sexuality in the construction of the Cuban Nation). Havana: Casa de las Américas.
- 2019 Fidel Castro. El comandante Playboy. Sexo, revolución y guerra fría. Editorial Hypermedia. ISBN 978-1948517461
- 2022 El cuerpo nunca olvida: Trabajo forzado, hombre nuevo y memoria en Cuba (1959-1980). Archive Fever. ISBN 979-8218252250.

== Chapters in books ==
- 2013 "Sexing The Nation's Body During The Cuban Republican Era." In: S. Wieringa and H. Sivori (Eds.) The sexual history of the Global South. Sexual politics in Africa, Asia and Latin America, London and New York: Zed Books, pp. 65–82.
- 2019 "Here, Everyone's Got Huevos, Mister!: Nationalism, Sexuality, and Collective Violence during the Mariel Exodus." In: Michael J. Bustamante y Jennifer L. Lambe. The Revolution from Within, Cuba 1959–1980. Duke University Press, pp 244–276.
