= Luis Aguilar Monsalve =

Ecuadorian writer and professor

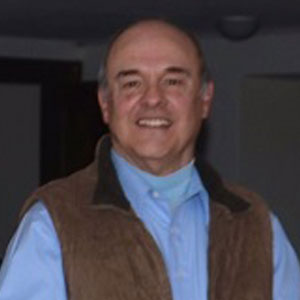
- Born: 7 October 1942 (age 83); Cuenca, Ecuador
- Citizenship: Ecuador
- Education: University of California, Los Angeles; Claremont Graduate University; Loyola Marymount University
- Occupations: Writer, professor
- Writing career
- Notable works: Breve historia y crítica de los movimientos literarios en Hispanoamérica; Y el hombre dio su vuelta en 80 mundos... Homenaje a Julio Cortázar; En busca de sor Edwina Marie; The Stitch of Silence
- Notable awards: The Daryl R. Karns Award for Scholarly and Creative Activity; The Fray Vicente Solano Award for Outstanding Educator and Creative Writer
- Movement: Latin American literature

Luis Aguilar Monsalve (born 7 October 1942) is a distinguished Ecuadorian writer, critic, and professor emeritus at Hanover College in the United States. He is a member of the Ecuadorian Academy of Language (Academia Ecuatoriana de la Lengua).

== Biography ==
Born in Cuenca, Aguilar Monsalve pursued his higher education in the United States. He earned a BA from Loyola Marymount University and an MA from Claremont Graduate University. He subsequently received both an MA and a PhD in Political Science and Latin American Literature from the University of California, Los Angeles (UCLA).

His academic career includes serving as a lecturer in language, culture, and literature at UCLA (1982–1995). From 1995 to 2001, he was Professor of Latin American Literature, Political Science, and International Relations at the Universidad San Francisco de Quito. He later served as a visiting assistant professor and writer-in-residence at Wabash College (2001–2006), followed by a decade-long tenure as a professor of Latin American literature and cultures at Hanover College (2006–2016).

== Literary work ==
Since 1986, Aguilar Monsalve has published nineteen collections of short stories, several of which have seen multiple editions. His work is recognized for its contribution to contemporary Ecuadorian letters, particularly through his mastery of the short story and his role in promoting the genre of *flash fiction* (*minificción*).

His bibliography includes the novel En busca de sor Edwina Marie(published by Editorial Verbum), two volumes of essays, and two notable anthologies: one focused on 21st-century Ecuadorian short stories and another on the evolution of Ecuadorian flash fiction.

== Awards and recognition ==
- 2013: The Daryl R. Karns Award for Scholarly and Creative Activity.
- 2012: Fray Vicente Solano Award for Outstanding Educator and Creative Writer.
- 2012: Elected Member of the Ecuadorian Academy of Language.
- 1996: Member of the Grupo América.

== Selected works ==
Year	Literary work	Genre
2025	Alcantarillas	Short Stories
2025	Más allá de la lluvia	Flash Fiction
2025	Antología del cuento de ciencia ficción ecuatoriano moderno	Anthology
2023	En el borde de lo etéreo	Flash Fiction
2023	Bajo el vaivén de lo insólito	Essay
2022	Antología del cuento infantil y juvenil ecuatoriano	Anthology
2021	Herederos de las sombras	Flash Fiction
2020	Disfraz	Flash Fiction
2019	Antología del Microcuento Ecuatoriano	Anthology
2019	If Winter Comes	Flash Fiction
2018	The Stitch of Silence	Short Stories
2017	Antología bilingüe del cuento ecuatoriano de inicios del siglo XXI	Anthology
2016	Antología básica e historia del cuento ecuatoriano	Anthology
2015	Y el hombre dio su vuelta en ochenta mundos... (Homenaje a Julio Cortázar)	Essay
2014	Escombros de humo	Short Stories
2013	Breve historia y crítica de los movimientos literarios en Hispanoamérica	Essay
2012	El cuento ecuatoriano 1970–2010	Anthology
2010	Mínimo mirador: microrrelatos	Flash Fiction
2009	Imágenes y otras historias	Short Stories
2008	En busca de sor Edwina Marie	Novel
2006	La otra cara del tiempo y otros cuentos	Short Stories
2005	Al otro lado de mi voz y otros cuentos	Short Stories
2004	Dejen pasar al viento	Short Stories
2003	Creo que se ha dicho que vuelvo	Short Stories
2001	La otra cara del tiempo	Short Stories
1999	El umbral del silencio	Short Stories
1995	Huellas y silencios	Short Stories
1986	A través de una rendija	Short Stories
1979	Alfredo Pareja Diezcanseco y su novela socio-política	Essay

== Selected anthologies ==
Aguilar Monsalve's work is included in the following anthologies:

Year	Title	Publisher and Details
2001	Literatura del Ecuador (cuatrocientos años): crítica y selecciones	Abya-Yala. ISBN 9789978046760.
2004	Antología Básica e Histórica del Cuento Ecuatoriano	11th edition.
2012	El cuento ecuatoriano 1970–2010	CCE Benjamín Carrión.
2012	Narrativa de Azuay y Cañar	CCE Benjamín Carrión. ISBN 9789942288165.
2016	Antología básica e historia del cuento ecuatoriano	
2017	Antología bilingüe del cuento ecuatoriano de inicios del siglo XXI	Bilingual anthology.
2017	Cuentos migrantes: antología	
2019	Antología del Microcuento Ecuatoriano	Eskeletra Editorial.
2021	Un autor, un relato	Generis Publishing. ISBN 9781639023226.
2022	Antología del cuento infantil y juvenil ecuatoriano	SK Editorial. ISBN 978-9942-42-458-7.
