= World Summit on Evolution =

Coordinates: 0°53′43.7″S 89°36′31.3″W

The World Summit on Evolution is an evolutionary biology meeting hosted at the Galapagos Islands by Universidad San Francisco de Quito (USFQ), an Ecuadorian private liberal arts university. Its focus is on recent research and new advances in our understanding of evolution and the diversity of life.

The summit hosts more than 150 participants presenting invited and submitted talks, poster sessions and scientific-outreach talks. It has been called "The Woodstock of Evolution" bringing together experts and students from widely different areas of evolutionary biology that rarely meet. It has attracted researchers working on evolution from over 15 different countries, including Peter and Rosemary Grant, Niles Eldredge, Antonio Lazcano, Douglas Futuyma, Lynn Margulis, Ada Yonath, William H. Calvin and Daniel Dennett.

== Objectives ==
Objectives:

Tree of Life

- Join experts from different branches of evolutionary biology to discuss on the impacts of recent discoveries in order to integrate them inside the basic concepts of evolution.

Through a series of presentations and discussions the participants ask the big questions: What is the evidence for the theory of evolution? How has each field and their respective approaches deepened our understating? And where are the future horizons? Bringing together international experts and students for debate helps to answer these questions and hopefully lead to decisions that will shape the direction of evolutionary science in the foreseeable future.

- Remind the scientific community of the importance of the Galapagos Islands and the discoveries produced thanks to their particular natural resources. Present the islands as a living and dynamic laboratory of evolution.
- Promote Ecuador, its research community and its academic institutions.

== Subjects ==
Subjects:

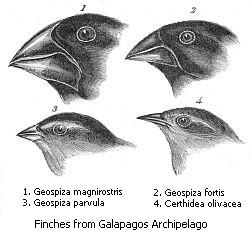
Darwin's Finches

- Origin and diversification of life—How did the first living cells originate, clues provided by RNA, new paradigms in prokaryotic and early eukaryotic evolution.
- Evolution of plants and animals—The origin of animals and fungi, evolution of tropical plants and social behavior in animals.
- Human Evolution—The study of human diet and digestive system explains human evolution and Darwin's ideas applied to human evolution.
- Evolution and infectious agents—The origin and evolution of AIDS and how bacteria acquire pathogenic features
- Creationism and Intelligent Design—Containing the spread of creationism and intelligent design, while improving the public’s understanding of evolution throughout the Americas and elsewhere.

== Location ==
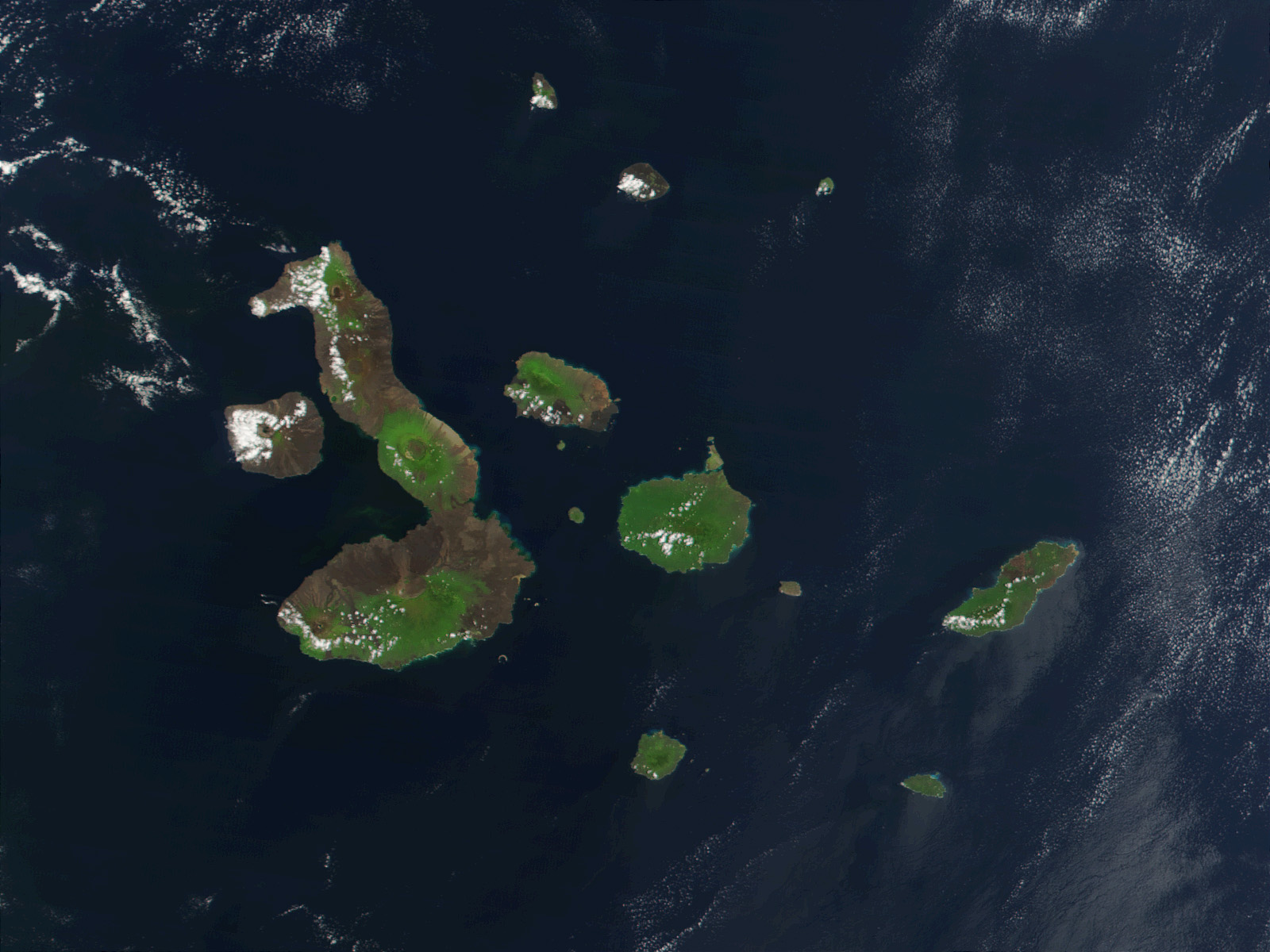
Satellite map of the Galapagos Islands

The World Summit on Evolution takes place at Galapagos Academic Institute for the Arts and Sciences (GAIAS), part of the Universidad San Francisco de Quito. GAIAS was established in 2002 at the capital town of the Galapagos province, Puerto Baquerizo Moreno, on the island of San Cristobal, one of the largest of the Galapagos Islands.

Its 4.5 hectare campus is the only one located on the historically significant Galapagos islands. GAIAS was founded on the principle that would become a first-rate institution for international students and researchers.

The Galapagos Islands inspired Charles Darwin to define his evolutionary theory, which revolutionized human understanding in relation to the diversity of species, including humans. His ideas were presented in On the Origin of Species.

The Galapagos Islands, are important for the scientific studies that have been developed over the centuries after his visit.

== Past and future summits ==
=== 9–12 June 2005 - First World Summit on Evolution ===
Source:

=== 22–26 August 2009 - Second World Summit on Evolution ===
The Second World Summit on Evolution was launched to celebrate Charles Darwin's 200th birthday.

The 2009 summit included the first meeting of the Sociedad Iberoamericana de Biología Evolutiva (SIBE). SIBE led to the establishment of academic and intellectual bonds between the Spanish- and Portuguese-speaking specialists in evolutionary biology.

=== 1–5 June 2013 - Third World Summit on Evolution ===
The summit adopted the theme ‘Why Does Evolution Matter’. 200-attendees met, to listen to 12 keynote speakers, 20 oral presentations and 31 posters by faculty, postdocs and graduate and undergraduate students. The Summit encompassed five sessions: evolution and society, pre-cellular evolution and the RNA world, behavior and environment, genome, and microbes and diseases. USFQ and GAIAS launched officially the Lynn Margulis Center for Evolutionary Biology and showcased the Galapagos Science Center, developed in partnership with the University of North Carolina at Chapel Hill.

Sessions
Title	Presenter(s)
Evolution, Science, Pseudo Science and the Public’s Perception of Reality	Guillermo Paz-y-Miño-C (University of Massachusetts) and Avelina Espinosa (Roger Williams University).
Evidence for the Protoribosome, a Pre-Bacterial Bonding Apparatus	Ada Yonath (Weizmann Institute, Israel)
RNA World Hypothesis	Marie-Christine Maurel (University Pierre-and-Marie-Curie, France)
RNA Molecules: From Zymonucleic Acids To Ribozymes	Antonio Lazcano (National Autonomous University of Mexico)
The Evolution of Cooperation	Charles Snowdon (University of Wisconsin Madison)
Impact of Pathogens on the Behavior, Ecology, and Conservation of the Endemic Galapagos Avifauna	Patricia Parker (University of Missouri St. Louis)
The Female Rule in the Galapagos Flightless Cormorant Phalacrocorax harrisi	Carlos Valle (USFQ-GAIAS)
Complexity and Evolution of Coral Reef Holobionts	Forest Rohwer (San Diego State University)
Technological Cutting-edge Strategies to Study the Human Genome	Roderic Guigó (University of Pompeu
Human Adaptations to Harsh Environments: The Molecular Footprint	Rasmus Nielsen (University of California Berkeley)
Examined Crypticity in Entamoeba: a Behavioral and Biochemical Tale	Avelina Espinosa and Guillermo Paz-y-Miño-C
Highly Fit Pathogens – Where to They Come From, How do they Evolve and Do they Really go Extinct?	Paul Keim (Northern Arizona University)
Multi-level Selection in the ‘Microbiosphere' as Consequence of Exposure to Human-made Antibiotics	Fernando Baquero (Ramón and Cajal University Hospital)
