= Iván Ulchur =

Iván Ulchur (born in Timbio, Cauca, 1950) is a literature professor at Universidad San Francisco de Quito. He is a writer and columnist in Ecuador, where he has lived with his family since 1987.

He has written five books, two of which are essays on Colombian theater, Imágenes de la Violencias and Teatro de Enrique Buenaventura, and one published in 1997 on the work of Gabriel García Marquez, Del Humor y otros Dominios. His other three books are fictional and vary from short stories, Muerte Profunda más allá de la ilusión, and Magnuscritos, to a recently published novel, Las No Veladas Vidas de Magnus Shorter (Editorial Norma, Ecuador, 2004).

As a columnist he has written for two Ecuadorian newspapers: El Comercio and El Hoy.

He obtained his Ph.D. at University of Texas at Austin in 1987, and worked as a visiting professor in Berea College, Kentucky, from 2001 to 2003.

Though he was born in Colombia, most of his work has been published in Ecuador.
