= Daniel Toledo =

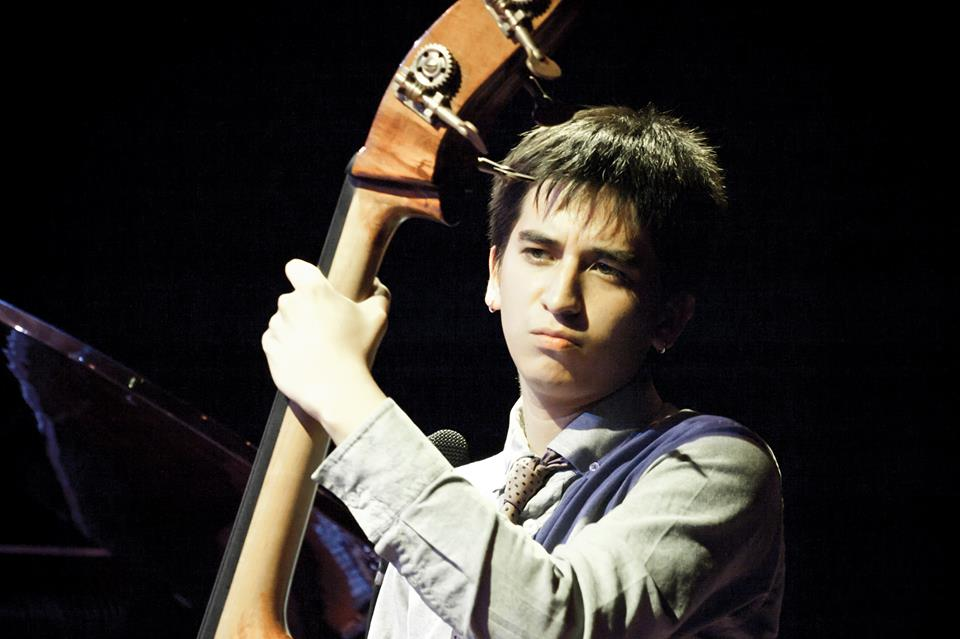

Background information
- Also known as: Daniel Toledo
- Born: Daniel Toledo; 11 June 1991 (age 34); Quito, Ecuador
- Genres: Jazz
- Occupation: Musician
- Instruments: Double Bass, Electric Bass
- Label: Audio Cave
- Website: www.dantbass.com

Daniel Toledo (born 11 June 1991, Quito, Ecuador) is an Ecuadorian jazz double bassist and composer. Graduated from the Berklee College of Music, Valencia Campus.

== Biography ==
Graduated of the Berklee College of Music with a master in "contemporary performance". He's a full-time professor at the Universidad San Francisco de Quito in the faculty of music giving classes of bass and ensembles. Quickly he begins to have prominence in different stages of his local city and forms part of the College of Music of the USFQ at an early age, where he makes the majority of his studies.

Winning of the edition 2010 of the Jazz Envoys with whom he performs in the prestigious Kennedy Center in Washington, D.C.. Since then he has kept actively working with the Embassy of the United States and the Department of State.

Daniel has been involved in the Polish Jazz scene since the year 2014, leading his own trio with Piotr Orzechowski (Pianohooligan) and Joshua Wheatley with whom he recorded his debut album Elapse in the 2014. In 2017 he releases his second album in Trio format with Piotr and Paul Svanberg entitled Atrium. This album received reviews in places like "All About Jazz", Polish Jazz Top 10 of 2017 among others. In 2018 he forms his Quartet with Polish musicians including Piotr Orzechowski, Kuba Więcek and Michał Miśkiewicz they release the album Fletch in 2020 with the Polish label Audio Cave receiving reviews in Polish and international media and do regular touring.

He has worked with artists and groups like Piotr Orzechowski, Ted Lo, John Blackwell, Perico Sambeat, Yoron Israel, Victor Mendoza, and others performing and making workshops in America south, America north, Asia and Europe.

== Discography ==
=== Fletch (February 2020) ===
Track list:

1. Fletch
2. Blue Star
3. Meek
4. Reflections
5. Keystone
6. Spiral Pin
7. Alerting

=== Atrium (February 2017) ===
Track list:

1. Atrium
2. Tawny
3. Abridged Perspective
4. Noa
5. Horyzont
6. Margins
7. Near Focus

=== Elapse (October 2014) ===
Track list:

1. Elapse
2. Mikkakan
3. Alerting
4. Nardis
5. Atmosphere Melt
6. Delicate Earthly Life
