= Casa de las Américas Prize =

Literary award

- Awarded for: Latin American and Caribbean literature in Spanish, Portuguese, English, and French
- Presented by: Casa de las Américas
- First award: 1960
- Website: www.casa.cult.cu/premios/literario

The Casa de las Américas Prize (Premio Literario Casa de las Américas) is a literary award given by the Cuban Casa de las Américas. Established in 1959, it is one of Latin America's oldest and most prestigious literary prizes.

The award is presented for works in Spanish, Portuguese, English, and French by writers from Latin America and the Caribbean. In addition to the main categories of fiction, poetry, and essays, it also includes categories for narrative and children's literature.

== History ==
The award was founded in 1959 as the Hispanic American Literary Competition (Concurso Literario Hispanoamericano), as a Latin American counterpart to the British Booker Prize and the U.S. Pulitzer Prize. It was renamed as the Latin American Literary Competition (Concurso Literario Latinoamericano) in 1964, and has been presented under its current name since 1965.

Since 1960, the main categories have been novels, poetry, short stories, drama, and essays in Spanish. In 1970, a new category was added for testimonial narratives, and in 1973, the essay and testimonio awards were expanded to include works in Portuguese by Brazilian authors. A category for children's literature was introduced in 1975, and works by Caribbean authors in English and French have been eligible in all fiction genres since 1976 and 1978, respectively. Since 1978, works by Brazilian authors in Portuguese have been eligible in all categories. In 2000, three honorary awards were established in the categories narrative, essay, and poetry.

Due to the growing diversity of genres and categories, awards in some categories are now presented in alternate years, and awards are not always presented in every category.

== Winners ==
Juries for the awards are made up of prominent writers, academics, and intellectuals from throughout Latin America.

Scholars and writers who have won the prize include Edward Brathwaite, Humberto Costantini, Beatriz Doumerc, Eduardo Galeano, Renato Prada Oropeza, Susana Rotker, Rachel Beauvoir-Dominique, Françoise Perus, Beatriz González-Stephan, Anthony Phelps, Luis Britto García, Diego Falconí and Abel Sierra Madero. Among them are many recipients whose work was virtually unknown and who are now widely read and translated into many languages, such as Jorge Enrique Adoum and Roque Dalton.

The Casa de las Américas Prize has been credited with attracting international attention to Latin American literature, and with contributing to a major literary renaissance that resulted in the awarding of the Nobel Prize in Literature to writers such as Pablo Neruda in 1971 and Gabriel García Márquez in 1982.
