= Diego Falconí =

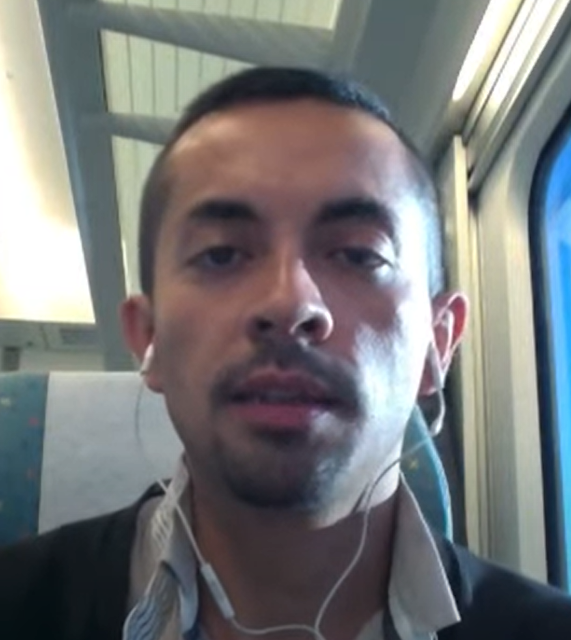
- Falconí in 2013
- Born: 1979 (age 46–47); Quito, Ecuador
- Education: Universidad San Francisco de Quito
- Occupations: Lawyer; Professor; Essayist

Diego Falconí Trávez (born in 1979, Quito) is an Ecuadorian lawyer, professor, and essayist. He focuses on gender studies, sexuality, decolonial theory, and Andean literature. He received the Casa de las Américas Prize in the essay category for his book De las cenizas al texto in 2016.

== Biography ==
Falconí studied at the San Francisco University of Quito and became a human rights lawyer focusing on gender and LGBTQIA+ perspectives. He obtained a doctorate degree in comparative literature and literary theory at the Autonomous University of Barcelona.

Falconí won the 2016 Casa de las Américas Prize in the essay category for his work, De las cenizas al texto. Literaturas andinas de las disidencias sexuales en el siglo XX. In the book, Falconí used the work of authors such as Pablo Palacio, Julieta Paredes, Fernando Vallejo, Jaime Bayly, and Adalberto Ortiz.

In 2018, he compiled, as an editor, the work Inflexión Marica. Escrituras del descalabro gay en América Latina. His work consists of essays by different authors on gay identity and sexual diversity in Latin America. In 2022, a newspaper called El Universo recommended his work among LGBT works by Ecuadorian authors.

Falconí is a professor and researcher at the College of Jurisprudence of the San Francisco University of Quito. He is also the director of the university's law journal, Iuris Dictio, and co-director of the Intertextos research group.

=== Personal life ===
Falconí is homosexual and claims the word "maricón" to identify his sexuality.

== Works ==
- Las entrañas del sujeto jurídico. Un diálogo entre la literatura y el derecho (2012)
- De las cenizas al texto. Literaturas andinas de las disidencias sexuales en el siglo XX (2016)

=== Editor ===
As an editor, Falconí has published the following works:

- Me fui a volver. Narrativas, autorías y lecturas teorizadas de las migraciones ecuatorianas (2014)
- A medio camino. Intertextos entre la literatura y el derecho (2016)
- Inflexión Marica. Escrituras del descalabro gay en América Latina (2018)

== See also ==
- LGBTQ literature in Ecuador
