= UNIGIS =

Worldwide network of universities

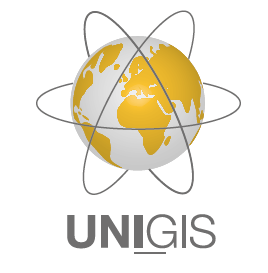
Logo of the UNIGIS Network

UNIGIS is a worldwide network of universities cooperating since 1992 in the design, development and delivery of distance learning in Geographical Information Science and Systems (GIS). Members of the UNIGIS network offer Postgraduate Certificate, Diploma and Masters courses in GIS by open and distance learning, following the mission of Educating GIS Professionals Worldwide.

Members of the UNIGIS network also work together in research and curriculum development activities related to GIS education. Programmes and courses are under continuous development and are currently being offered in English, German, Hungarian, Portuguese, Spanish and Polish languages. UNIGIS each year enrolls more than 600 new students worldwide.

== UNIGIS courses ==
UNIGIS courses are modular and flexible study programmes. The content varies to meet local student needs. Optional courses give the opportunity to tailor the programme to meet individual student needs, and residential workshops are offered to support areas of the courses. Topics covered in the UNIGIS courses include:

- Spatial data
- Database theory
- Geodata sources
- GIS and organisations
- Spatial Thinking
- Visualisation of Spatial Data
- Project management
- Applications development
- Remote sensing
- GIS and modelling
- Environmental impact analysis

Students use digital and printed study materials including specially developed study notes, guided readings, and practical exercises. Professional GIS software to support practical work is provided at no cost to students. Students are encouraged to use their work experience in the course, and to apply their new knowledge from their study to their work situations.

== Partner institutions ==
- UNIGIS International Association
- UNIGIS Amsterdam at the Vrije Universiteit Amsterdam
- UNIGIS Central Asia at ACA*GIScience
- UNIGIS Girona at the University of Girona
- UNIGIS Hungary at the Óbuda University (Alba Regia Technical Faculty, Institute of Geoinformatics)
- UNIGIS India
- UNIGIS Kathmandu, jointly provided by the University of Salzburg and Kathmandu Forestry College
- UNIGIS Latin America at Universidad San Francisco de Quito and the University of Belgrano
- UNIGIS Lisbon at Universidade Nova de Lisboa
- UNIGIS Poland at the Jagiellonian University in Kraków
- UNIGIS Salzburg (German and English language) at the University of Salzburg
- UNIGIS Zagreb at the University of Salzburg, delivered through Oikon

== See also ==
- Geographic information system (GIS)
- Geographic information science
- Geoinformatics

== Social media ==
- LinkedIn UNIGIS alumni worldwide
- Blog UNIGIS news
