= Marit Sandvei =

Norwegian footballer (born 1987)

Personal information
- Full name: Marit Sandvei
- Date of birth: 21 May 1987 (age 39)
- Height: 1.62 m (5 ft 4 in)
- Positions: Defender; midfielder

Youth career
- Rælingen
- Skjetten Fotball

Senior career*
| Years | Team | Apps | (Gls) |
| 2006–2016 | LSK Kvinner FK | 134 | (17) |

International career^{‡}
| 2009–2016 | Norway | 11 | (0) |
- * Club domestic league appearances and goals ‡ National team caps and goals as of 09:10, 24 October 2016 (UTC)

Marit Sandvei (born 21 May 1987) is a Norwegian former footballer who played as a defender. She spent her entire career with LSK Kvinner FK with whom she has also played in the Champions League.

She has been a member of the Norway women's national football team, taking part in UEFA Women's Euro 2009 and being recalled to the squad for the 2015 FIFA Women's World Cup.
