= Juan Manuel Rodriguez (writer) =

Spanish-born Ecuadorian author and professor

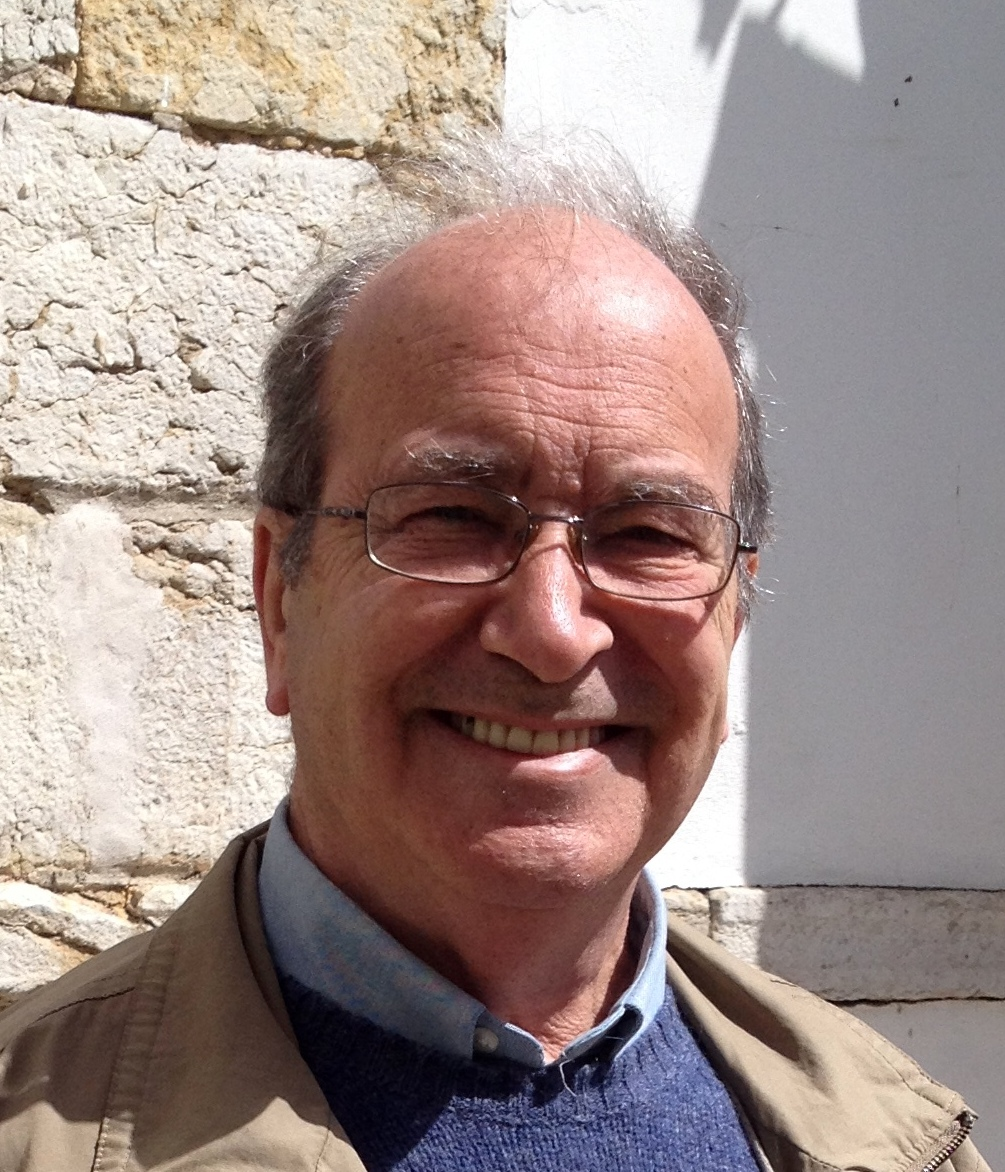

Juan Manuel Rodríguez López (born in Bilbao in 1945) is a Spanish-born, naturalized Ecuadorian author and professor. He holds a licenciate/BA degree in philosophy and a doctorate in literature from Pontificia Universidad Católica del Ecuador (PUCE). He was a professor at Universidad Central del Ecuador and Universidad Católica, as well as a founding professor of Universidad San Francisco de Quito, where he was Dean of the College of Communication and Contemporary Arts.

He has published novels and short-story collections in Ecuador, Spain and Mexico, as well as various academic and reference books, including essays and literary criticism. He has also been a columnist and editorial writer for the newspaper La Hora and the magazine Chasqui (CIESPAL).

== Published works ==
=== Fiction ===
==== Short stories ====
- Trepa la Nube. Quito: Rayuela Editores, 2019.
- El Mar y la Muralla. Quito: Libresa, 1992 & 1997 (3rd ed. Quito: Editorial Universitaria, Universidad Central del Ecuador, 1994).
- Fricciones. Quito: Ediciones de la Pontificia Universidad Católica del Ecuador, 1991.
- Algunas Compras y Otros Encargos. Quito: Ediciones y Distribuciones J.L.I., 1981.

==== Novels ====
- Un vacío tan lleno. Quito: Dinediciones, 2025.
- Camaleón albino. Quito: Dinediciones, 2012.
- Cinturón de Fuego. Quito: Ediciones Libri Mundi, 2005 (2nd ed. Quito: Casa de la Cultura Ecuatoriana, 2009).
- El Poder de los Vencidos. Madrid: Mileto Ediciones, 2003.
- El Pez Perfume. Quito: Grupo Editorial Norma, 1997 (2nd ed. Madrid: Mileto Ediciones, 2002).
- El Pulso de la Nada. Quito: Libresa, 1996.
- El Espantapájaros. Mexico: Editorial Diana, 1990 (2nd ed. Quito: Libresa, 1995).
- Jorma el Predicador. Madrid: Alba, 1983 (2nd ed. Quito: Universidad San Francisco de Quito, 2015).

=== Non-fiction ===
- Rodríguez, Juan Manuel (2017). El animal infoxicado. Quito: Universidad San Francisco de Quito.
- Rodríguez, Juan Manuel (2015). Convivencias del caminante. Quito: Universidad San Francisco de Quito.
- Rodríguez, Juan Manuel (2009). "Cosmovisión, ideología y alienación en El muelle". In Égüez, Ivan (ed.). Capítulo Aparte. Quito: Campaña Nacional Eugenio Espejo por el Libro y la Lectura.
- Rodríguez, Juan Manuel (2008). Información Estética en el Relato. Quito: Ediciones Ciespal.
- Rodríguez, Juan Manuel (2007). "El ombligo: enchufe o puerto". Anaconda, Cultura y Arte. Quito.
- Rodríguez, Juan Manuel (2003). "Desafíos de la Televisión Frente a Otros Medios de Comunicación". In Jaramillo Salas, Edgar P (ed.). Evolución y Retos de la Televisión. Quito: CIESPAL.
- Rodríguez, Juan Manuel (December 2002). "Viaje hacia la noche". Re/incidencias: Centenario de Jorge Carrera Andrade (1902-1978) (1). Quito: Centro Cultural Benjamín Carrión: 311–318.
- Rodríguez, Juan Manuel (2002). "Riqueza Informativa, Miseria Comunicacional". In Jaramillo Salas, Edgar P (ed.). El Futuro de los Diarios. Quito: CIESPAL.
- Rodríguez, Juan Manuel; Mónica Burbano de Lara (2001–2002). Educar para la Vida: Desarrollo del Pensamiento, Vol. 1-10. Quito: Libresa.
- Isacovici, Salomon; Rodríguez, Juan Manuel (1999). Man of Ashes. trans. by Dick Gerdes. Lincoln, Nebraska: University of Nebraska Press.
- Rodríguez, Juan Manuel (1998). Diccionario de Conjugación de los Verbos Castellanos. Quito: Universidad San Francisco de Quito: Grupo Editorial Santillana.
- Isacovici, Salomon; Rodríguez, Juan Manuel (1990). A7393: Hombre de Cenizas [A7393: Man of Ashes]. Mexico: Editorial Diana.
- Rodríguez, Juan Manuel (1986). Manual de Conjugación de los Verbos Castellanos. Madrid: Alba.
- Rodríguez, Juan Manuel (1979). "Aproximación à la Estructura Narrativa de la Novela Cumandá". In Corrales Pascual, Manuel; Aguirre, Francisco E (eds.). Cumandá, 1879-1979: Contribución a un Centenario. Quito: Ediciones de la Universidad Católica.
- Rodríguez, Juan Manuel (1977). "R. Pérez Torres o el Absurdo Agónico". In Corrales Pascual, Manuel (ed.). Situación del Relato Ecuatoriano, Vol II. Quito: Centro de Publicaciones, Pontificia Universidad Católica del Ecuador.

== Awards ==
- Second prize, Gabriel Miró International Short Story Contest (Alicante, España), for the short story 'Levedad del vino', 1986.
- Finalist,'Novedades y Diana' International Literary Prize (Mexico), with the novel El espantapájaros, 1988.
- Ecuador's National Prize for Literature 'Aurelio Espinosa Pólit' for the short-story collection Fricciones, 1990.
- Second Prize for Art and Literature, Universidad Central del Ecuador, for the novel El espantapájaros, 1991.
- Finalist,'Planeta/Joaquín Mortiz' Award (Mexico), with the novel La derrota, 1992 (later published in revised form in 2003 as El poder de los vencidos).
- First Prize for Art and Literature, Universidad Central del Ecuador, for the short-story collection El Mar y la Muralla, 1992.
- Third Prize, IV Biennal Ecuadorian Novel Contest, for the work El pulso de la nada, 1996.
- Doctorado Honoris Causa en Artes ('in artibus') de la Universidad San Francisco de Quito (USFQ), 1998.
