= Beatriz Doumerc =

Argentine writer of children's literature (1929–2014)

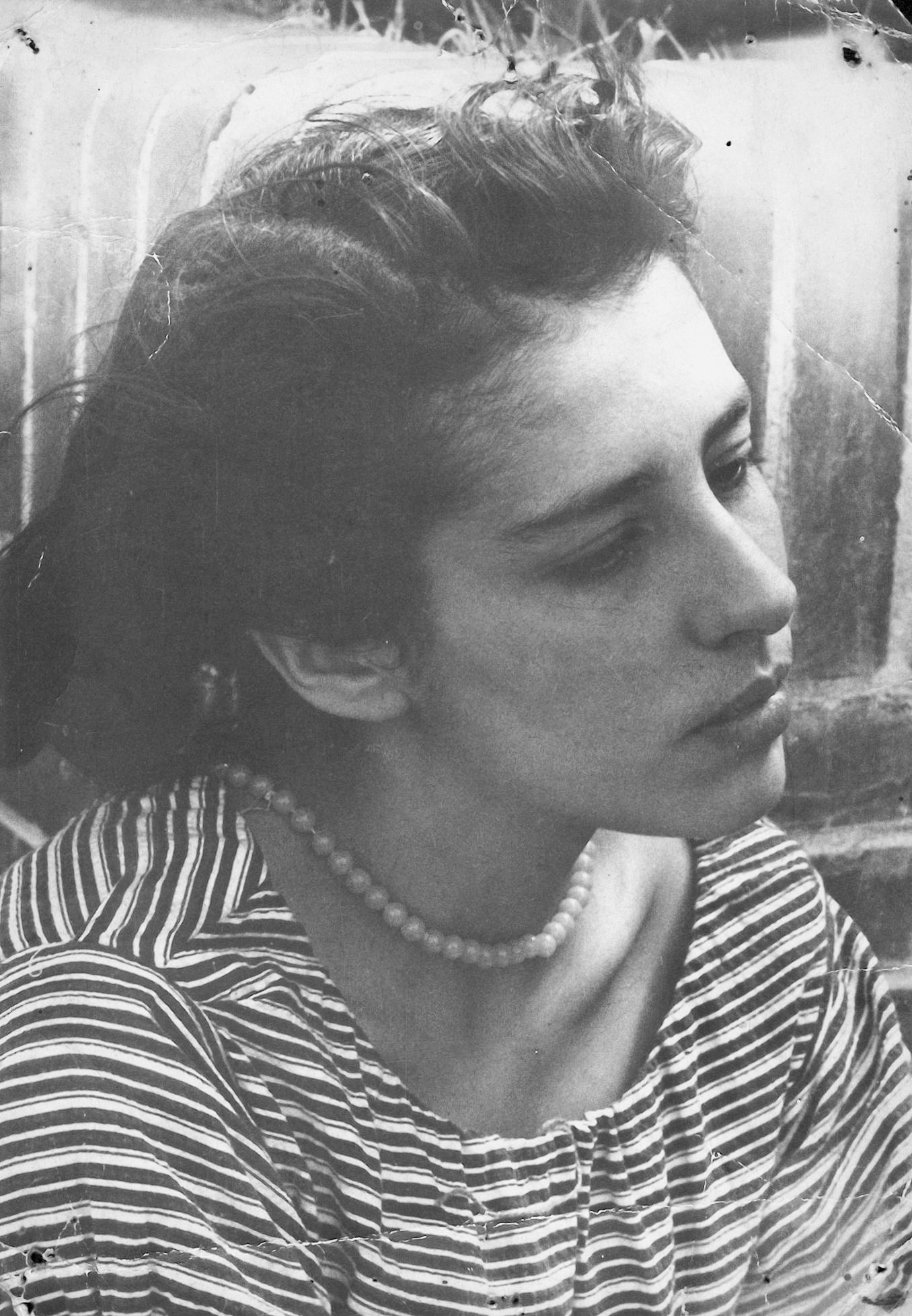
- Born: 1929; Buenos Aires, Argentina
- Died: March 26, 2014 (aged 84–85); Barcelona, Spain
- Occupation: Writer
- Spouse: Ayax "Pacho" Barnes
- Children: 1
- Writing career
- Genre: Children's literature
- Notable work: La línea
- Notable awards: Casa de las Américas Prize

Beatriz Doumerc de Barnes (Buenos Aires, Argentina, 1929 – Barcelona, Spain, March 26, 2014) was an Argentine writer of children's literature. Her book, La línea (Buenos Aires, Granica, 1975), illustrated by her husband, Ayax "Pacho" Barnes, was awarded the Casa de las Américas Prize in 1975.

== Biography ==
Beatriz Doumerc was born in Buenos Aires in 1929. Her studies included Fine Arts.

Censored in Argentina during the Dirty War, she lived in Rome, Italy, from 1977 to 1984. From 1984 until her death in 2014, she resided in Barcelona, Spain. her books were published in Argentina, Spain, Italy, Venezuela, Uruguay, and Sweden. Her work has been awarded in the U.S. and Europe. In addition to her many books, Doumerc also made adaptations of Gargantua and Pantagruel (1986) and the Popol Vuh (1988) for the Spanish publisher, Lumen.

She married illustrator Ajax Barnes, who illustrated many of her texts. She had a son, Gabriel.

== Awards and honours ==
- Casa de las Américas Prize, 1975, for La línea
- Apel.les Mestres Award, Barcelona, 1986, for Daniel y los reyes
- Premio Lazarillo, Spain, 1987, for Un cuento grande como una casa

== Selected works ==
- Cómo se hacen los niños (Buenos Aires, Schapire, 1974). Illustrated by Ayax Barnes
- La línea (Buenos Aires, Granica, 1975). Illustrated by Ayax Barnes.
- Truck sale de paseo (Buenos Aires, 1975). Illustrated by Ayax Barnes
- El pueblo que no quería ser gris (Buenos Aires, Editorial Rompan Fila, 1975). Illustrated by Ayax Barnes. (It was banned by decree 1888 of September 3, 1976.)
- La pipa de Juan (Madrid, Nueva Frontera, 1980)
- Blanca Rosa y Salem-Salim (Madrid, Nueva Frontera, 1980)
- Firulete en el trono (Madrid, Nueva Frontera, 1980)
- Tic Tac, el marciano (Madrid, Nueva Frontera, 1980)
- El búho Caramelo (Madrid, Nueva Frontera, 1980)
- La abeja Jovita (Madrid, Nueva Frontera, 1980)
- Zorrito y el cazador (Madrid, Nueva Frontera, 1980)
- Bruja Maruja contra Ogro Torvo (Madrid, Bruguera, 1981)
- El viaje de Ida/El viaje de Regreso (Estocolmo, Nordan, 1982).
- Aserrín, aserrán (Estocolmo, Nordan, 1984).
- Casos y cosas de gusano y mariposa (Madrid, Espasa-Calpe, 1985).
- Caramelo va de paseo (Madrid, Espasa Calpe, 1985).
- Truck capitán intrépido (Barcelona, Juventud, 1986).
- Truck desaparece (Barcelona, Juventud, 1986).
- Truck en el circo (Barcelona, Juventud, 1986).
- Truck sale de noche (Barcelona, Juventud, 1986).
- De puerta en puerta (Madrid, Espasa Calpe, 1987).
- Tamarindo el pastelero (Barcelona, Juventud, 1987).
- El castillo embrujado (Barcelona, Juventud, 1987).
- Tal para cual (Barcelona, Destino, 1987).
- Daniel y los reyes (Barcelona, Destino, 1987).
- Cuando todo pasa volando (Zaragoza, Edelvives, 1988).
- El pueblo que no quería ser gris (Rompan Filas Ediciones 1975).
- Un cuento grande como una casa (Madrid, Anaya, 1988).
- Eva Perón (Buenos Aires, Lumen, 1989)
- El pájaro Federico (Zaragoza, Edelvives, 1990).
- Una pluma con historia (Zaragoza, Edelvives, 1990).
- ¿Quién llegará primero? (Madrid, SM, 1990).
- Simón el dragón (Madrid, SM, 1990).
- Dos en apuros (Barcelona, Edebé, 1994).
- Vida de gato (Barcelona, Grijalbo-Mondadori, 1995).
