= Universidad San Francisco de Quito =

Private university in Quito, Ecuador

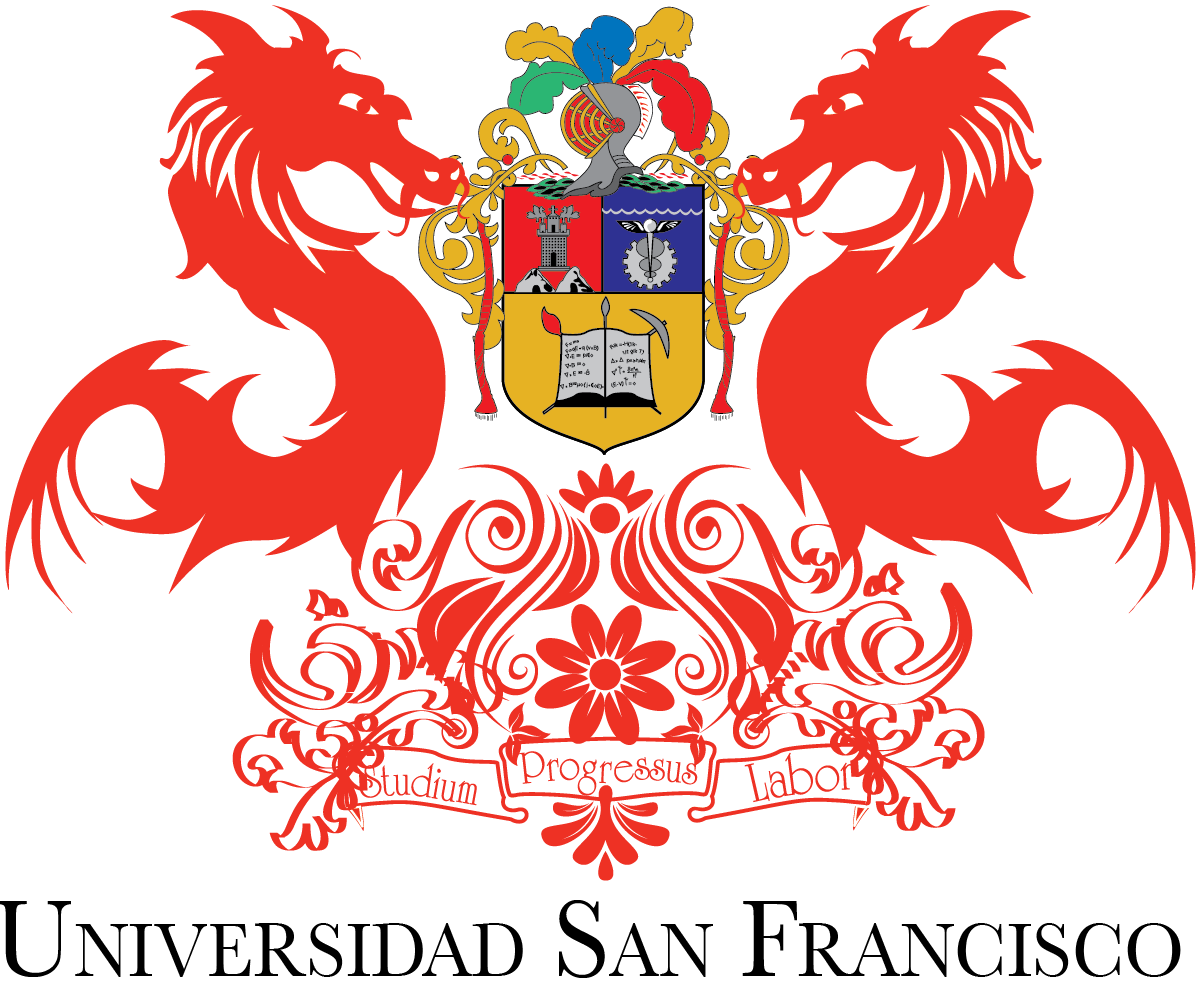
- Seal of Universidad San Francisco de Quito
- Motto: Studium, Progressus, Labor (in Latin)
- Motto in English: Study, Progress, Work
- Type: Private university
- Established: August 16, 1988; 37 years ago
- Affiliations: Berklee International Network; UNIGIS; Institut Paul Bocuse Worldwide Alliance; Confucius Institute; CLI
- Chancellor: Santiago Gangotena, Ph.D.
- Rector: Diego Quiroga, Ph.D.
- Faculty: 300 full-time faculty
- Administrative staff: 160
- Students: 9,044
- Undergraduates: 8,700
- Postgraduates: 300
- Location: Quito, Ecuador; 0°11′48″S 78°26′09″W
- Campus: Three throughout Ecuador, in Cumbayá-Quito, Galápagos Islands, and Tiputini Biodiversity Station, next to the Yasuni National Park
- Umbrella organization: Corporación de Promoción Universitaria
- Colours: Red
- Mascot: Dragon
- Website: usfq.edu.ec (in Spanish)

Universidad San Francisco de Quito USFQ (informally Universidad San Francisco, or simply USFQ) is a liberal-arts, private university located in Quito, Ecuador. It was the first totally private self-financed university in Ecuador and the first liberal-arts institution in the Andean region.

Academically, USFQ ranks as one of the three-top universities (category A) in the ranking of Ecuadorian universities (being the only totally private university to qualify for the highest category), issued by the Ecuadorian Council of Evaluation and Accreditation of High Education (Consejo Nacional de Evaluación y Acreditación de la Educación Superior CONEA). In 2009, it was ranked first in Ecuador in relation to the number of peer-reviewed scientific publications.

The university now enrolls 5,500 students, 4,500 of whom are undergraduates. The university each year has about 100 indigenous students and 1,000 international students participate in USFQ academic programs. USFQ has developed a scholarship program for indigenous students, offering full scholarships to the best students of public high schools throughout Ecuador. Although USFQ receives no funding from the government of Ecuador, its faculty comprises one-half of all the people in that nation who hold a Ph.D.

The main campus of USFQ is located in Cumbayá, outside of Quito, where students use a library, education and research laboratories, classrooms, and seven restaurants. USFQ is the only university in the world that owns a campus in the Galapagos Islands, and a campus in the Yasuni Biosphere Reserve (Tiputini Biodiversity Station), one of Earth's most biodiverse areas.

== History ==
Universidad San Francisco de Quito USFQ was founded in 1988 by Santiago Gangotena González through a non-profit institution he also founded, Corporación de Promoción Universitaria, its umbrella foundation. It was the first totally private self-financed university in Ecuador. It was named after the city of Quito. It was recognized by the Ministry of Education and Culture of Ecuador in October 1995 and accredited by CONESUP in May 2001.

=== Establishment of the Corporación de Promoción Universitaria ===
In 1980, Santiago Gangotena brought together a group of Ecuadorian and international intellectuals and businesspeople, to establish the non-profit Corporación de Promoción Universitaria, with the mission to create a private Ecuadorian university. The corporation was legalized by the Ministry of Education and Culture of Ecuador in June 1985.

=== Foundation of the University ===
After eight years of planning and promotion, the first class of students started on September 1, 1988, in a manor located on the 12 de Octubre Ave. 1983 and Salazar St., in the northern area of Quito, with 132 students. The university was recognized by the Ecuadorian government on October 18, 1995, under Executive Decree 3166, published in the Official Registry 809 on October 25, 1995. The statutes of the university were approved by the National Council of High Education CONESUP on May 18, 2001.

=== Creation of the colleges ===
USFQ is divided among academic colleges (faculties). In 1988, students were distributed among three academic colleges: Colegio de Administración para el Desarrollo for business studies, Colegio de Ciencias Aplicadas for applied sciences, and Colegio de Comunicación y Cultura for communication, arts and cultural studies. In 1990, USFQ started the Colegio de Ciencias Ambientales for environmental sciences.

In 1992, six colleges were established: Colegio de Administración para el Desarrollo, Colegio de Comunicación y Artes, Colegio de Ciencias Ambientales, Colegio de Ciencias Aplicadas, Colegio de Ciencias Sociales y Humanidades, y Colegio de Lenguas. Subsequently, in 1993, the Colegio de Arquitectura started, followed in 1994 by the Colegio de Agricultura and the Colegio de Ciencias de la Salud. In 1997, the Colegio de Ciencias Sociales y Humanidades changed its name to Colegio de Artes Liberales.

=== Colleges of the university ===
By 2017, USFQ is divided in 10 academic in three campuses across Ecuador (Cumbayá-Quito, Tiputini Biodiversity Station, and the Galápagos Islands):

- Colegio de Administración y Economía (CADE) - College of Business Administration and Economics
- Colegio de Arquitectura y Diseño Interior (CADI) - College of Architecture and Interior Design
- Colegio de Ciencias Sociales y Humanidades (COCISOH) - College of Social Sciences and Humanities
- Colegio de Ciencias Biológicas y Ambientales (COCIBA) - College of Biological and Environmental Sciences
- Colegio de Ciencias de la Salud (COCSA) - College of Health Science
- Colegio de Ciencias e Ingeniería (Politécnico) - College of Sciences and Engineering - The Polytechnic
- Colegio de Comunicación y Artes Contemporáneas (COCOA) - College of Communication and Contemporary Arts
- Colegio de Hospitalidad, Arte Culinario y Turismo (CHAT) - College of Hospitality, Culinary Arts, and Tourism
- Colegio de Jurisprudencia (JUR)- College of Jurisprudence
- Colegio de Musica (CoM) - College of Music
- Academia Regional de Redes CISCO-USFQ - Regional CISCO-USFQ Academy
- GAIAS - Galapagos Academic Institute for the Arts and Sciences
- Instituto Confucio - Confucius Institute
- Instituto de Enseñanza y Aprendizaje (IDEA) - Institute of Teaching and Learning
- Instituto de Lenguas Extranjeras (ILE) - Institute of Foreign Languages

=== Contributions to the advancement of science and society ===
- DØ experiment, by Bruce Hoeneisen, founder and professor of the Physics department at the Colegio de Ciencias e Ingeniería El Politécnico, USFQ.
- Hosting the First and Second World Summit on Evolution (called "The Woodstock of Evolution")
- Extending higher education to indigenous people, with the largest Ecuadorian scholarship program focused solely on native Ecuadorian people.
- Conducting one of the largest studies in the country on the effects of environmental changes on diarrheal disease, Project EcoDess
- Making revolutionary genetic discoveries on the Rotavirus and Leptospira, by the Institute of Microbiology of the Colegio de Ciencias Biológicas y Ambientales (COCIBA), USFQ.
- Discovering and describing the first animal genus (Nymphargus) described by an Ecuadorian, by Diego F. Cisneros-Heredia, professor of the Colegio de Ciencias Biológicas y Ambientales (COCIBA), USFQ.
- Working on the publication of the book on Important Bird Area of Ecuador.
- Research on the biodiversity of Amazonia, confirming that Yasuni has global conservation significance due to its biodiversity and potential to sustain this biodiversity in the long term.
- Involvement in all major films of last-decade Ecuadorian cinema, including Ratas, ratones y rateros, Crónicas by Sebastián Cordero, and Qué tan lejos by Tania Hermida.

=== Traditions ===
The university has developed traditions, including:

- University Day, Dies Universitatis (El Día de la Universidad), celebrates the foundation of the university and is held on the first Thursday of September.
- The White Coat Ceremony (La Ceremonia del Mandil Blanco), marks the transition of the students of the College of Health Sciences from the study of preclinical to clinical health sciences.
- Academic dress is worn by faculty and students during the graduation ceremonies and on the Day of the university.

== Notable alumni and faculty ==
- Magdalena Barreiro, former Minister of Economy of Ecuador - USFQ Professor
- Rafael Correa, former President of Ecuador- former USFQ Professor (taught Economic Theory).
- Juan Martín Cueva, film director - USFQ Professor
- Diego Falconí, lawyer - USFQ Professor.
- Fausto Miño, singer - USFQ alumni
- Amy Gende, indigenous politician
- Luis Aguilar Monsalve - writer and USFQ professor emeritus
- Juan Manuel Rodriguez, writer - USFQ Professor
- Ana Estrella Santos, dialectologist, writer - former USFQ Professor
- Daniel Toledo, musician, composer - USFQ Professor and Alumni
- Iván Ulchur, Writer - USFQ Professor
- Valentina Centeno, assemblywoman - USFQ Alumni
- Joaquín López, trailrunner - USFQ Alumni
- Gabriela Sommerfeld, chancellor - USFQ Alumni
- Esteban Torres, assemblyman - USFQ Alumni
- Gisella Bayona, journalist - USFQ Alumni
- María Grazzia Acosta, journalist - USFQ Alumni
- Gabriela Galarraga, journalist and former queen of Quito - USFQ Alumni

== See also ==
- List of universities in Ecuador
