= Cushla Lichtwark =

New Zealand netball player and footballer

- Born: Cushla Myra Arama Lichtwark; 29 November 1980 (age 45); Hamilton, New Zealand
- Years active: 2008–present
- Known for: Netball player, footballer
- Height: 1.81 m (5 ft 11 in)
- Netball career
- Playing positions: GD, WD
Years	Club team	Apps
2008–2011	Central Pulse	
Association football career
- Position: Goalkeeper
Senior career*
Years	Team	Apps	(Gls)
- Upper Hutt City
- Capital Football
- Upper Hutt City
- * Club domestic league appearances and goals

Cushla Myra Arama Lichtwark (born 29 November 1980) is a New Zealand netball player and a former footballer.

== Career ==
She played netball in the ANZ Championship for the Central Pulse since the inaugural season of the Wellington-based in 2008, and became captain of the side in 2009. She also became a member of the New Zealand Accelerant Group since 2008.

After retiring from professional netball in 2011, she began her football career, which she had played as a child. She was first called up to the New Zealand women's national team in January 2015 for friendlies against Denmark, and again in February for matches against North Korea and Australia. She was again called up for matches against Spain in March 2015, and on 13 May was included in New Zealand's squad for the 2015 FIFA Women's World Cup in Canada, despite having no international caps. In late 2015, she was called up for friendlies against Brazil, before being called up in January 2016 for Olympic qualifying against Papua New Guinea. She received her last call up for matches against Australia in June 2016, but never made an international appearance.
