= 2016 Women's Africa Cup of Nations final =

Association Football match

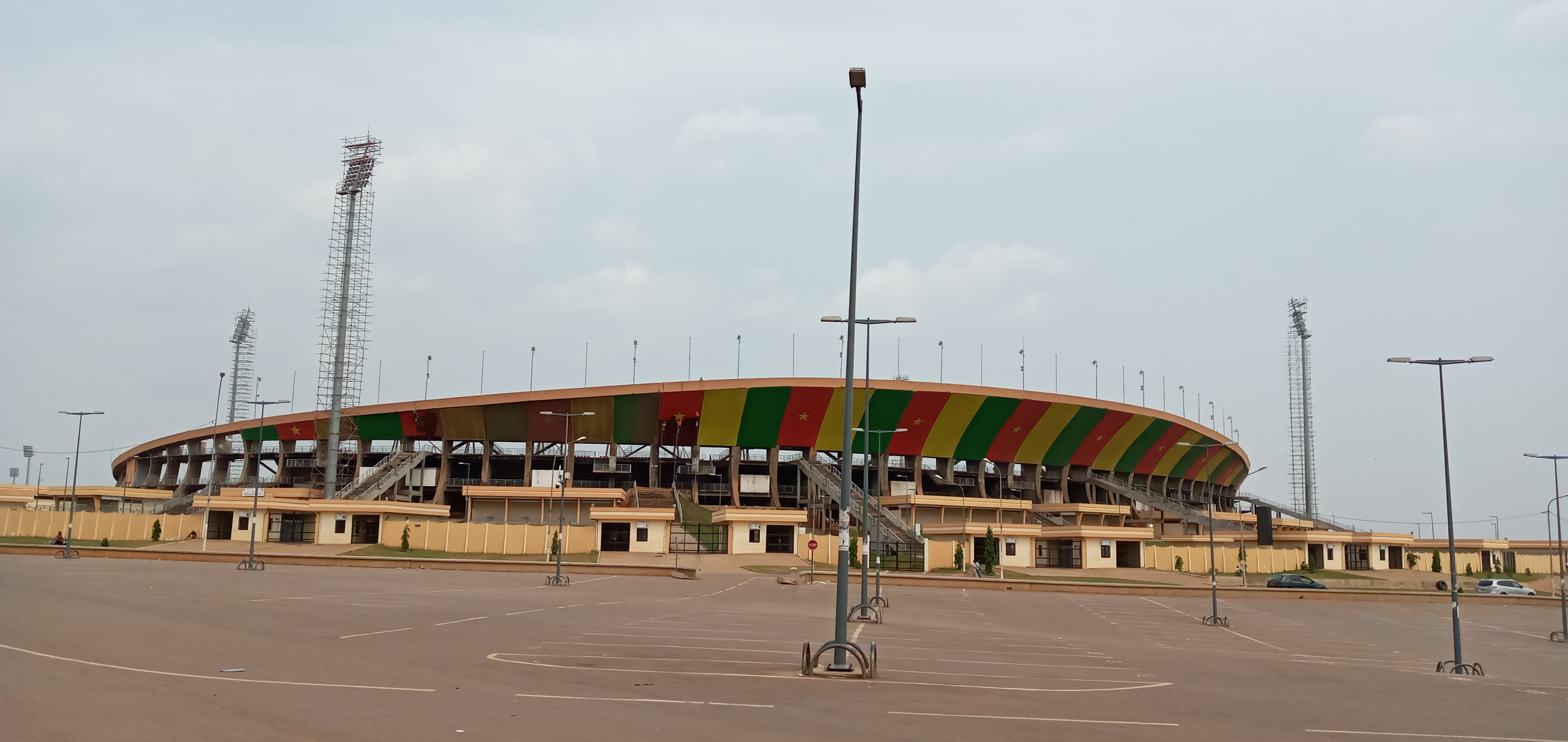
- The venue of the final
- Event: 2016 Women's Africa Cup of Nations
Cameroon	Nigeria
(Cameroon)	(Nigeria)
0	1
- Date: 3 December 2016
- Venue: Ahmadou Ahidjo Stadium, Yaoundé
- Player of the Match: Desire Oparanozie (Nigeria)
- Referee: Aissata Ameyo Amegee (Togo)
- Attendance: 40,000

The 2016 Women's Africa Cup of Nations final was an association football match that took place on 3 December 2016 at the Ahmadou Ahidjo Stadium in Yaoundé, Cameroon which determined the winner of the 2016 Women's Africa Cup of Nations. The final was contested between hosts Cameroon and Nigeria in what was a repeat of the 2014 final.

Nigeria won their eighth Wafcon title, emerging victorious 1–0 courtesy of a 86th minute goal by Desire Oparanozie, who also won player of the match.

== Background ==
Before the match, Cameroon had reached the Women's Africa Cup of Nations final twice (2004 and 2014), finishing runners-up in all attempts losing both to Nigeria. This was also Nigeria's eighth appearance in a continental final after previously winning in all finals they have featured in.

Cameroon qualified for the final after topping their group where they won all of their group matches. A 1–0 semi-final win over Mali sealed another consecutive finals.

Nigeria, also led by a female coach Florence Omagbemi, topped Group B with emphatic 6–0 and 4–0 victories over Ghana and Kenya before 1–0 wins over South Africa in the semi-final saw them into the final. The 2016 Final was the third time that the two teams had met in the competition's final.

== Venue ==
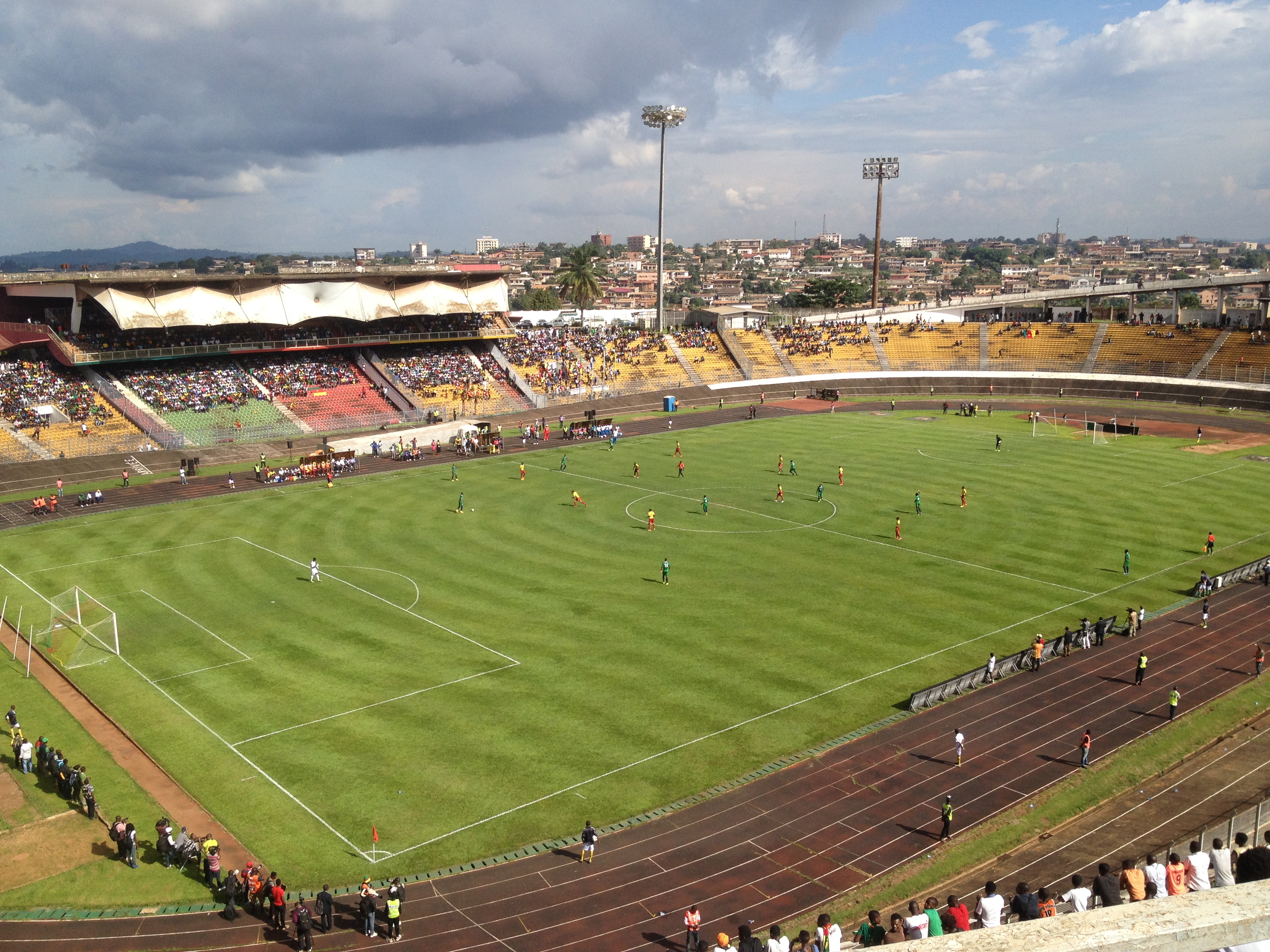
Stade Ahmadou Ahidjo in Yaoundé, Cameroon hosted the final.

Ahmadou Ahidjo Stadium is a multi-purpose stadium in Yaoundé, Cameroon. It is used mostly for football matches and it also has athletics facilities. It was built in 1972. The stadium has been renovated in 2016 ahead of the African Women Cup of Nations tournament. It has a capacity of 42,500 seats. It is the home stadium of Canon Yaoundé, Tonnerre Yaoundé and the women's club Louves Minproff. The stadium is also known as the home venue of the Cameroonian national football team, who drew the stadium's record attendance of 120,000 in a football match in the 1980s.

== Route to the final ==
Cameroon
Round
Nigeria
Opponent
Result
Group stage
Opponent
Result
Egypt
2–0
Match 1
Mali
6–0
South Africa
1–0
Match 2
Ghana
1–1
Zimbabwe
2–0
Match 3
Kenya
4–0
Group A winners

Team	Pld	W	D	L	GF	GA	GD	Pts
Cameroon (H)	3	3	0	0	5	0	+5	9
South Africa	3	1	1	1	5	1	+4	4
Egypt	3	1	0	2	1	7	−6	3
Zimbabwe	3	0	1	2	0	3	−3	1

Source: CAF
(H) Hosts
Final standings
Group B winners

Group B winner
Team	Pld	W	D	L	GF	GA	GD	Pts
Nigeria	3	2	1	0	11	1	+10	7
Ghana	3	2	1	0	7	3	+4	7
Mali	3	1	0	2	4	10	−6	3
Kenya	3	0	0	3	2	10	−8	0

Source: CAF
Opponent
Result
Knockout stage
Opponent
Result
Ghana
1–0
Semi-finals
South Africa
1–0

== Match ==
In front of Cameroon president Paul Biya and the thousands of fans who filled the 40,000 capacity Ahmadou Ahidjo Stadium, the hosts had the best of the first half, with a number of chances for Aboudi Onguene, but the Indomitable Lionesses failed to make the most of their opportunities.

In the second half, Desire Oparanozie, who also scored Nigeria's winner against South Africa in their semi-final, hit the decisive goal again when she broke the deadlock four minutes from time after following through on a pass from the tournament's leading scorer Asisat Oshoala to give Nigeria their record extending eighth championship.

=== Details ===
3 December 2016
15:30

Cameroon	0–1	Nigeria
	Report	Oparanozie 86'

Ahmadou Ahidjo Stadium, Yaoundé
Attendance: 40,000
Referee: Aissata Ameyo Amegee (Togo)

Cameroon	Nigeria

GK	1	Annette Ngo Ndom
DF	15	Ysis Sonkeng
CB	2	Christine Manie (c)
DF	11	Aurelle Awona
DF	12	Falone Meffometou
MF	19	Agathe Ngani
MF	8	Raissa Feudjio
FW	7	Gabrielle Aboudi Onguene
MF	3	Nchout Njoya Ajara
FW	18	Henriette Akaba
FW	17	Gaëlle Enganamouit
Substitutes:
DF	4	Yvonne Leuko
MF	5	Augustine Ejangue
FW	14	Agnès Nkada
Manager:
(Cameroon) Enow Ngachu

GK	16	Alaba Jonathan	(yellow card) 94'
RB	15	Ugo Njoku
DF	2	Faith Ikidi
CB	5	Onome Ebi
DF	3	Osinachi Ohale
MF	13	Ngozi Okobi
MF	18	Halimatu Ayinde
MF	10	Rita Chikwelu (c)
FW	17	Francisca Ordega		(substituted off) 64'
FW	9	Desire Oparanozie
FW	8	Asisat Oshoala
Substitutes:
MF	7	Wogu Chioma Success		(substituted on) 64'
DF	14	Evelyn Nwabuoku
MF	19	Ijeoma Obi
Manager:
(Nigeria) Florence Omagbemi
