= 2014 Women's Africa Cup of Nations final =

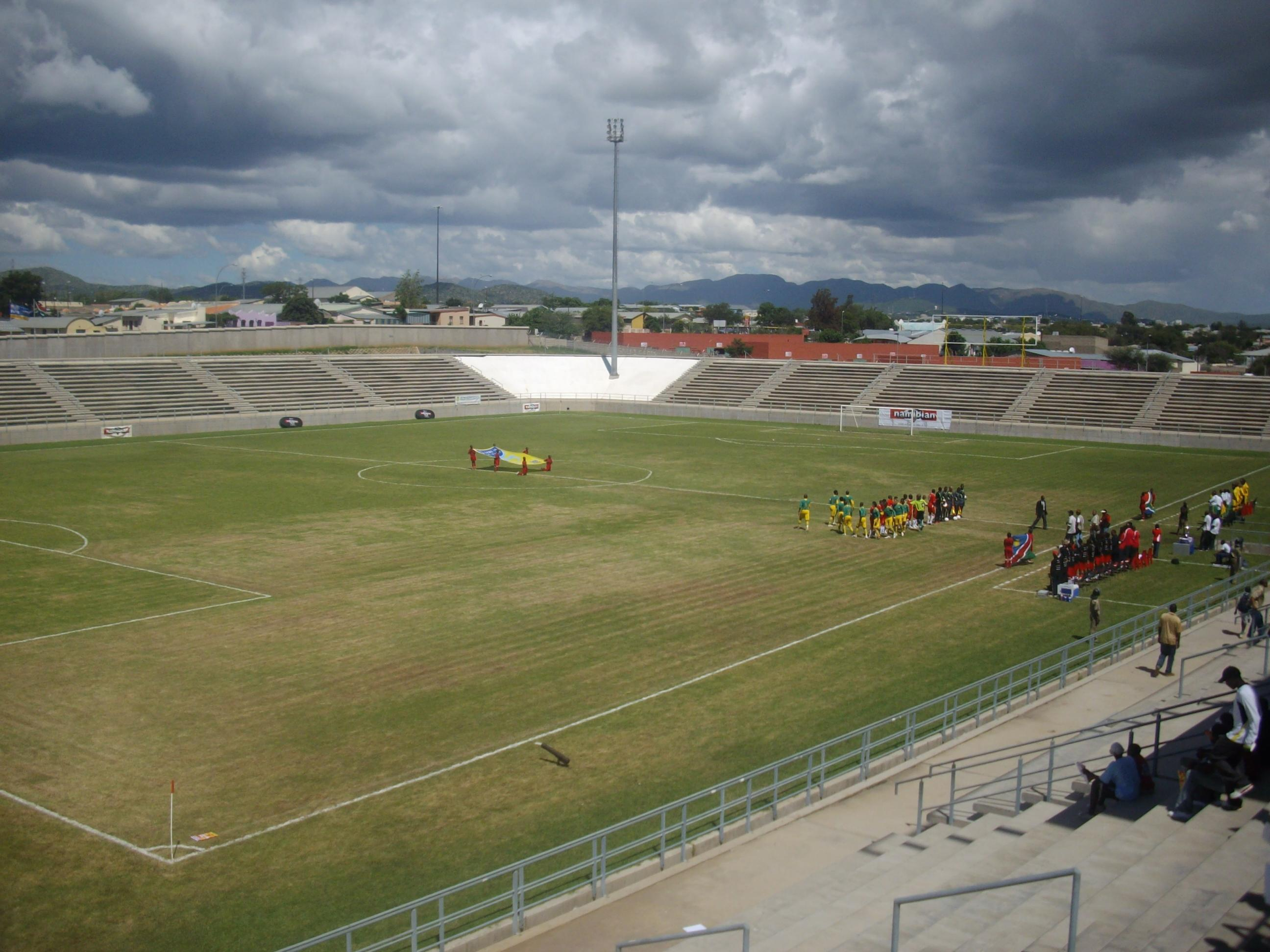
- Sam Nujoma Stadium, Windhoek, Namibia, where the final was held
- Event: 2014 African Women's Championship
| Nigeria | Cameroon |
| (Nigeria) | (Cameroon) |
| 2 | 0 |
- Date: 25 October 2014
- Venue: Sam Nujoma Stadium, Windhoek, Namibia
- Referee: Gladys Lengwe (Zambia)
- Attendance: 7,000

The final of 2014 African Women's Championship was held on 25 October 2014 at Sam Nujoma Stadium in Windhoek, Namibia. The match was won by the record champions Nigeria, who earned their seventh African title with a 2–0 win over Cameroon.

== Route to the final ==
Nigeria
Round
Cameroon
Opponent
Result
Group stage
Opponent
Result
Ivory Coast
4–2
Match 1
South Africa
1–0
Zambia
6–0
Match 2
Algeria
2–0
Namibia
2–0
Match 3
Ghana
0–1
Group A winner

| Pos | Team | Pld | Pts |
|---|---|---|---|
| 1 | Nigeria | 3 | 9 |
| 2 | Ivory Coast | 3 | 4 |
| 3 | Namibia (H) | 3 | 3 |
| 4 | Zambia | 3 | 1 |

Source: CAF
(H) Hosts
Final standings
Group B winner

| Pos | Team | Pld | Pts |
|---|---|---|---|
| 1 | Cameroon | 3 | 6 |
| 2 | South Africa | 3 | 4 |
| 3 | Ghana | 3 | 4 |
| 4 | Algeria | 3 | 3 |

Source: CAF
Opponent
Result
Knockout stage
Opponent
Result
South Africa
2–1
Semi-finals
Ivory Coast
2–1 (a.e.t.)

== Match ==
=== Summary ===
The final began with Nigeria dominating fashion when they gained a 1-0 led on the 12th minute through Desire Oparanozie.

Just before the interval Asisat Oshoala, who had just won the Golden Ball at the 2014 FIFA U-20 Women's World Cup scored to extend Nigeria's lead. The match ended 2–0 to secure Nigeria's seventh WAFCON title.

== Final ==
25 October 2014
20:00

| Nigeria | 2–0 | Cameroon |
|---|---|---|
| Oparanozie 12'; Oshoala 43' | Report |

Sam Nujoma Stadium, Windhoek
Attendance: 7,000
Referee: Gladys Lengwe (Zambia)

| Nigeria | Cameroon |

| GK | 16 | Ibubeleye Whyte |
| DF | 3 | Ngozi Ebere |
| MF | 2 | Evelyn Nwabuoku (c) |
| DF | 20 | Ugo Njoku | (substituted off) 79' |
| DF | 5 | Onome Ebi |
| DF | 6 | Josephine Chukwunonye |
| FW | 8 | Asisat Oshoala | (substituted off) 87' |
| MF | 10 | Halimatu Ayinde | (substituted off) 65' |
| MF | 18 | Ngozi Okobi |
| FW | 9 | Desire Oparanozie |
| FW | 14 | Francisca Ordega |
Substitutes:
| FW | 19 | Martina Ohadugha | (substituted on) 65' |
| DF | 12 | Osinachi Ohale | (substituted on) 79' |
| FW | 4 | Perpetua Nkwocha | (substituted on) 87' |
| FW | 7 | Stella Mbachu |
Manager:
Edwin Okon

| GK | 1 | Annette Ngo Ndom |
| DF | 2 | Christine Manie (c) |
| DF | 13 | Cathy Bou Ndjouh |
| DF | 4 | Yvonne Leuko |
| DF | 5 | Augustine Ejangue |
| MF | 8 | Raissa Feudjio |
| MF | 10 | Jeannette Yango |
| FW | 6 | Francine Zouga | (substituted off) 46' |
| DF | 7 | Gabrielle Onguene | (substituted off) 78' |
| FW | 17 | Gaëlle Enganamouit |
| FW | 9 | Madeleine Ngono Mani | (substituted off) 61' |
Substitutes:
| FW | 3 | Njoya Nkout | (substituted on) 46' |
| MF | 11 | Adrienne Iven | (substituted on) 61' |
| MF | 18 | Henriette Akaba | (substituted on) 78' |
| DF | 15 | Ysis Sonkeng |
Manager:
Enow Ngachu

MATCH OFFICIALS

- Assistant referees:
  - Souad Oulhaj (Morocco)
  - Bernadettar Kwimbira (Malawi)

== Aftermath ==
Nigeria reclaimed the African title. The Super Falcons won their seventh African championship, extending their record as the continent's most successful women's national team.

Cameroon's coach Enow Ngachu viewed qualification for the World Cup as an opportunity to increase participation and improve the development and organisation of women's football in Cameroon.

Asisat Oshoala was named the tournament's Best Player, having already won the Golden Ball and Golden Boot at the 2014 FIFA U-20 Women's World Cup earlier in the year. In January 2015, she also won both the CAF Female Player of the Year and CAF Youth Women's Player of the Year awards. Desire Oparanozie won the Golden Boot, finishing the tournament with five goals. Cameroon's goalkeeper Annette Ngo Ndom won the Best Goalkeeper award.
