= 2026 Women's Africa Cup of Nations final =

Final match of the 2026 Women's Africa Cup of Nations

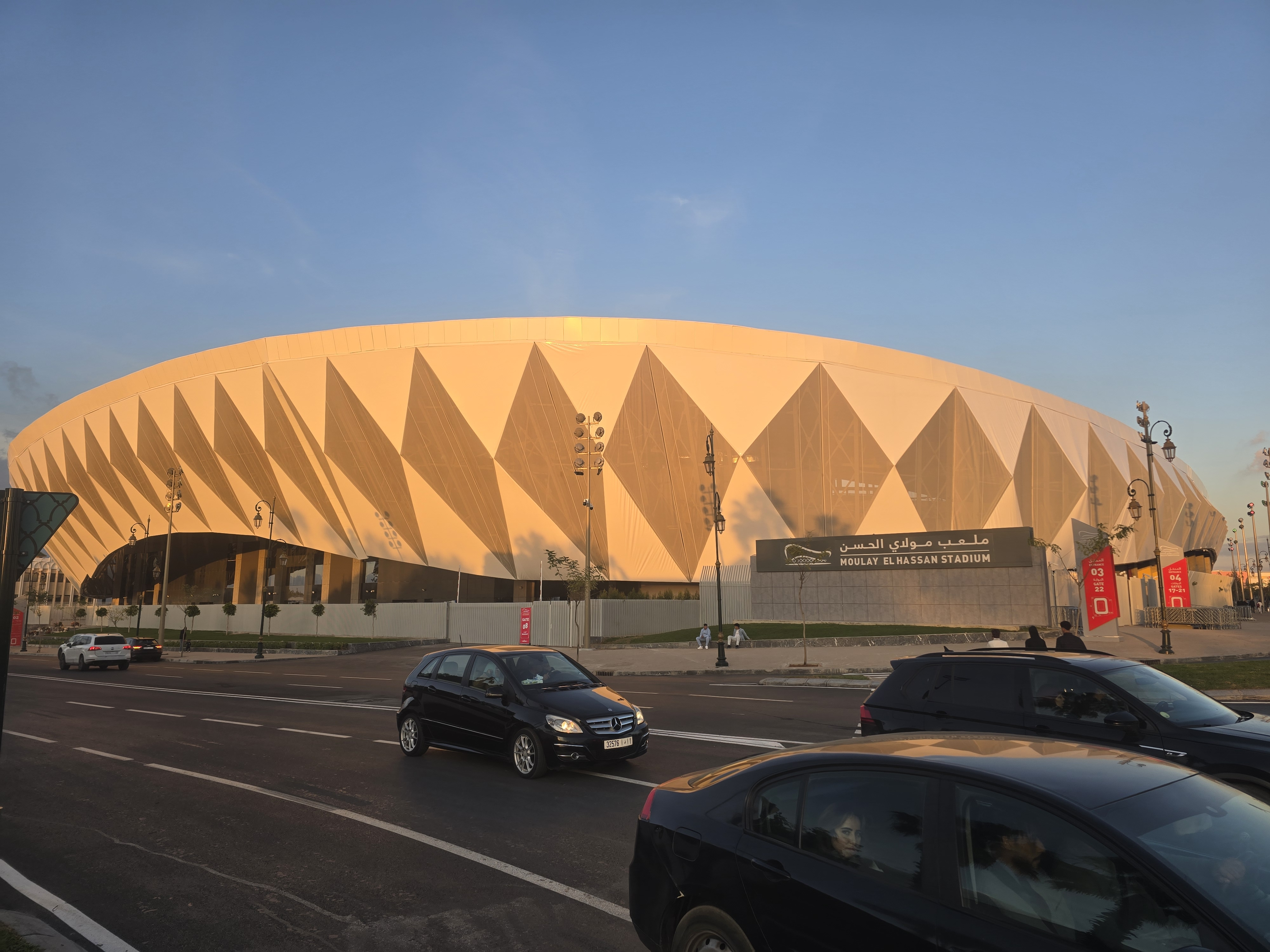
- The final was played at Moulay El Hassan Stadium.
- Event: 2026 Women's Africa Cup of Nations
Cameroon	Malawi
3	0
- Date: 16 August 2026
- Venue: Moulay El Hassan Stadium, Rabat
- Player of the Match: Marie Ngah Manga
- Referee: Shahenda El Maghrabi (Egypt)

The 2026 Women's Africa Cup of Nations final was a women's football match played on 16 August 2026 at the Moulay El Hassan Stadium in Rabat, Morocco. It determined the winners of the 2026 Women's Africa Cup of Nations (WAFCON), the 14th edition (Note: If hostless editions of the tournament are included, the 2026 edition was the 16th edition.) of the African women's football championship, organised by the Confederation of African Football (CAF). It was contested between Cameroon and debutants Malawi.

The final matchup was widely regarded as one of the greatest upsets in the history of WAFCON, with neither being among the favourites to win it, and neither team has ever won a major women's trophy. Furthermore, Malawi were competing in the tournament for the first time in their history and the lowest ranked team in it (ranked 153rd in the world), but won Group C and later qualified for their first ever FIFA Women's World Cup in 2027 in Brazil. Cameroon played in their fourth final, having previously featured in the 2004, 2014 and 2016 finals, losing to Nigeria on all three occasions 5–0, 2–0 and 1–0 respectively. Cameroon became just the fourth team to ever win WAFCON, with Equatorial Guinea, Nigeria and South Africa being the only teams to win the tournament.

== Background ==
The 2026 Women's Africa Cup of Nations (WAFCON) featured 16 teams divided into four groups of four, expanded from the 12 teams initially planned to compete. The top two teams advanced to the knockout stage. Morocco hosted their third consecutive tournament, with Casablanca and Rabat hosting the matches at six separate venues (two in Casablanca and four in Rabat), after plans to also play some matches in Fez were cancelled. The tournament was controversially postponed to be held from 25 July to 16 August 2026.

Neither Cameroon nor Malawi (who had never even played in a major tournament before) have ever won the tournament, and thus were not expected to make the final over the favourites, who were hosts and reigning runners-up Morocco and reigning champions and record 10-time champions Nigeria, with Algeria, South Africa and Zambia being regarded as the other primary contenders. Cameroon have previously played in three Women's Africa Cup of Nations (WAFCON; formerly the African Women's Championship) finals, losing to Nigeria on all three occasions (5–0 in 2004, 2–0 in 2014 and 1–0 in 2016). Either team will become just the fourth team to win WAFCON, with Nigeria, Equatorial Guinea and South Africa being the only other women's African champions.

== Venue ==
The final was held at Moulay El Hassan Stadium in Rabat, Morocco. Having completed construction in 2025, it had never been used for a major final before.

== Match ==
16 August 2026
20:00

Cameroon	3–0	Malawi
Ngah Manga 20', 45+3'; Eto 29'	Report (FIFA)

Moulay El Hassan Stadium, Rabat
Referee: Shahenda El Maghrabi (Egypt)
