= 2015 FIFA Women's World Cup Group D =

Football tournament group stage

Group D of the 2015 FIFA Women's World Cup consisted of the United States, Australia, Sweden and Nigeria. Matches were played from 8 to 16 June 2015.

Group D was the group of death of the 6 groups of this FIFA World Cup with three top 10-ranked teams. Sweden (5th ranked) and the United States (2nd ranked) were drawn together for the fourth successive World Cup (two of those groups had also featured Nigeria), and were joined by 10th ranked Australia, along with 33-ranked Nigeria.

== Teams ==
Draw position	Team	Confederation	Method of qualification	Date of qualification	Finals appearance	Last appearance	Previous best performance	FIFA Rankings at start of event
D1 (seed)	United States	CONCACAF	CONCACAF Women's Championship winners	24 October 2014	7th	2011	Winners (1991, 1999)	2
D2	Australia	AFC	AFC Women's Asian Cup runners-up	18 May 2014	6th	2011	Quarter-finals (2007, 2011)	10
D3	Sweden	UEFA	UEFA Group 4 winners	17 September 2014	7th	2011	Runners-up (2003)	5
D4	Nigeria	CAF	African Women's Championship winners	22 October 2014	7th	2011	Quarter-finals (1999)	33

== Standings ==
Pos	Team	Pld	W	D	L	GF	GA	GD	Pts	Qualification
1	United States	3	2	1	0	4	1	+3	7	Advance to knockout stage
2	Australia	3	1	1	1	4	4	0	4	Advance to knockout stage
3	Sweden	3	0	3	0	4	4	0	3	Advance to knockout stage
4	Nigeria	3	0	1	2	3	6	−3	1	

Source: FIFA
Rules for classification: Group stage tiebreakers

The group's final standings was one of the three instances in a FIFA World Cup where advancement may have been different under the old two points for a win scoring system compared to the actual result under the three points for a win system.

In the round of 16:

- United States advanced to play Colombia (third-placed team of Group F).
- Australia advanced to play Brazil (winner of Group E).
- Sweden (as one of the four best third-placed teams) advanced to play Germany (winner of Group B).

== Matches ==
=== Sweden vs Nigeria ===
8 June 2015
15:00 CDT (UTC−5)

Sweden	3–3	Nigeria
Oparanozie 21' (o.g.); Fischer 31'; Sembrant 60'	Report	Okobi 50'; Oshoala 53'; Ordega 87'

Investors Group Field, Winnipeg
Attendance: 31,148
Referee: Ri Hyang-ok (North Korea)

Sweden	Nigeria

GK	1	Hedvig Lindahl
RB	23	Elin Rubensson
CB	5	Nilla Fischer
CB	4	Emma Berglund	(substituted off) 73'
LB	16	Lina Nilsson
CM	17	Caroline Seger (c)
CM	7	Lisa Dahlkvist	(substituted off) 57'
RW	9	Kosovare Asllani	(substituted off) 46'
LW	15	Therese Sjögran
CF	8	Lotta Schelin
CF	10	Sofia Jakobsson
Substitutions:
MF	22	Olivia Schough	(substituted in) 46'
DF	3	Linda Sembrant	(substituted in) 57'
DF	14	Amanda Ilestedt	(substituted in) 73'
Manager:
Pia Sundhage

GK	1	Precious Dede
RB	3	Osinachi Ohale
CB	6	Josephine Chukwunonye
CB	5	Onome Ebi
LB	23	Ngozi Ebere
CM	14	Evelyn Nwabuoku (c)
CM	12	Halimat Ayinde
RW	8	Asisat Oshoala
LW	13	Ngozi Okobi
CF	17	Francisca Ordega
CF	9	Desire Oparanozie
Manager:
Edwin Okon

Player of the Match:
Ngozi Okobi (Nigeria)

Assistant referees:
Hong Kum-nyo (North Korea)
Kim Kyoung-min (South Korea)
Fourth official:
Abirami Naidu (Singapore)
Fifth official:
Widiya Shamsuri (Malaysia)

=== United States vs Australia ===
8 June 2015
18:30 CDT (UTC−5)

United States	3–1	Australia
Rapinoe 12', 78'; Press 61'	Report	De Vanna 27'

Investors Group Field, Winnipeg
Attendance: 31,148
Referee: Claudia Umpiérrez (Uruguay)

United States	Australia

GK	1	Hope Solo
RB	11	Ali Krieger
CB	4	Becky Sauerbrunn
CB	19	Julie Johnston
LB	22	Meghan Klingenberg
CM	12	Lauren Holiday	(yellow card) 56'
CM	10	Carli Lloyd
RW	23	Christen Press		(substituted off) 68'
LW	15	Megan Rapinoe	(yellow card) 64'	(substituted off) 86'
CF	20	Abby Wambach (c)
CF	2	Sydney Leroux		(substituted off) 79'
Substitutions:
MF	17	Tobin Heath		(substituted in) 68'
FW	13	Alex Morgan		(substituted in) 79'
MF	14	Morgan Brian		(substituted in) 86'
Manager:
Jill Ellis

GK	18	Melissa Barbieri
RB	5	Laura Alleway	(substituted off) 83'
CB	6	Servet Uzunlar
CB	8	Elise Kellond-Knight
LB	7	Stephanie Catley
CM	10	Emily van Egmond
CM	19	Katrina Gorry	(substituted off) 80'
RW	11	Lisa De Vanna (c)
LW	9	Caitlin Foord
CF	23	Michelle Heyman	(substituted off) 69'
CF	20	Samantha Kerr
Substitutions:
FW	17	Kyah Simon	(substituted in) 69'
DF	14	Alanna Kennedy	(substituted in) 80'
FW	3	Ashleigh Sykes	(substituted in) 83'
Manager:
Alen Stajcic

Player of the Match:
Megan Rapinoe (United States)

Assistant referees:
Luciana Mascaraña (Uruguay)
Loreto Toloza (Chile)
Fourth official:
Gladys Lengwe (Zambia)
Fifth official:
Widiya Shamsuri (Malaysia)

=== Australia vs Nigeria ===
12 June 2015
16:00 CDT (UTC−5)

Australia	2–0	Nigeria
Simon 29', 68'	Report

Investors Group Field, Winnipeg
Attendance: 32,716
Referee: Stéphanie Frappart (France)

Australia	Nigeria

GK	1	Lydia Williams
CB	5	Laura Alleway
CB	14	Alanna Kennedy
CB	7	Stephanie Catley
DM	8	Elise Kellond-Knight
CM	10	Emily van Egmond
CM	19	Katrina Gorry	(substituted off) 62'
RW	17	Kyah Simon	(substituted off) 87'
LW	9	Caitlin Foord
CF	11	Lisa De Vanna (c)
CF	20	Samantha Kerr
Substitutions:
MF	13	Tameka Butt	(substituted in) 62'
FW	23	Michelle Heyman	(substituted in) 87'
Manager:
Alen Stajcic

GK	1	Precious Dede
RB	3	Osinachi Ohale		(substituted off) 52'
CB	6	Josephine Chukwunonye	(yellow card) 60'
CB	5	Onome Ebi
LB	23	Ngozi Ebere
CM	14	Evelyn Nwabuoku (c)	(yellow card) 42'
CM	12	Halimat Ayinde
RM	8	Asisat Oshoala		(substituted off) 84'
LM	13	Ngozi Okobi
CF	17	Francisca Ordega
CF	9	Desire Oparanozie		(substituted off) 54'
Substitutions:
DF	15	Ugo Njoku		(substituted in) 52'
FW	4	Perpetua Nkwocha		(substituted in) 54'
FW	10	Courtney Dike		(substituted in) 84'
Manager:
Edwin Okon

Player of the Match:
Lisa De Vanna (Australia)

Assistant referees:
Manuela Nicolosi (France)
Yolanda Parga (Spain)
Fourth official:
Quetzalli Alvarado (Mexico)
Fifth official:
Souad Oulhaj (Morocco)

=== United States vs Sweden ===
12 June 2015
19:00 CDT (UTC−5)

United States	0–0	Sweden
	Report

Investors Group Field, Winnipeg
Attendance: 32,716
Referee: Sachiko Yamagishi (Japan)

United States	Sweden

GK	1	Hope Solo
RB	11	Ali Krieger
CB	19	Julie Johnston
CB	4	Becky Sauerbrunn
LB	22	Meghan Klingenberg
CM	10	Carli Lloyd (c)
CM	12	Lauren Holiday
RW	14	Morgan Brian	(substituted off) 58'
LW	15	Megan Rapinoe
CF	23	Christen Press	(substituted off) 67'
CF	2	Sydney Leroux	(substituted off) 78'
Substitutions:
FW	8	Amy Rodriguez	(substituted in) 58'
FW	20	Abby Wambach	(substituted in) 67'
FW	13	Alex Morgan	(substituted in) 78'
Manager:
Jill Ellis

GK	1	Hedvig Lindahl
RB	23	Elin Rubensson
CB	14	Amanda Ilestedt
CB	5	Nilla Fischer
LB	18	Jessica Samuelsson
CM	7	Lisa Dahlkvist
CM	17	Caroline Seger
RW	10	Sofia Jakobsson
LW	16	Lina Nilsson	(substituted off) 70'
CF	15	Therese Sjögran	(substituted off) 75'
CF	8	Lotta Schelin (c)
Substitutions:
DF	3	Linda Sembrant	(substituted in) 70'
MF	20	Emilia Appelqvist	(substituted in) 75'
Manager:
Pia Sundhage

Player of the Match:
Hedvig Lindahl (Sweden)

Assistant referees:
Naomi Teshirogi (Japan)
Sarah Walker (New Zealand)
Fourth official:
Ledya Tafesse (Ethiopia)
Fifth official:
Souad Oulhaj (Morocco)

=== Nigeria vs United States ===
16 June 2015
17:00 PDT (UTC−7)

Nigeria	0–1	United States
	Report	Wambach 45'

BC Place, Vancouver
Attendance: 52,193
Referee: Kateryna Monzul (Ukraine)

Nigeria	United States

GK	1	Precious Dede
RB	22	Sarah Nnodim	(yellow card) 38' (yellow-red card) 69'
CB	6	Josephine Chukwunonye	(yellow card) 60'
CB	5	Onome Ebi	(yellow card) 43'
LB	23	Ngozi Ebere
CM	14	Evelyn Nwabuoku (c)
CM	13	Ngozi Okobi	(yellow card) 68'
RW	17	Francisca Ordega		(substituted off) 77'
LW	7	Esther Sunday		(substituted off) 50'
CF	10	Courtney Dike		(substituted off) 50'
CF	8	Asisat Oshoala
Substitutions:
FW	9	Desire Oparanozie		(substituted in) 50'
MF	12	Halimat Ayinde		(substituted in) 50'
MF	20	Cecilia Nku		(substituted in) 77'
Manager:
Edwin Okon

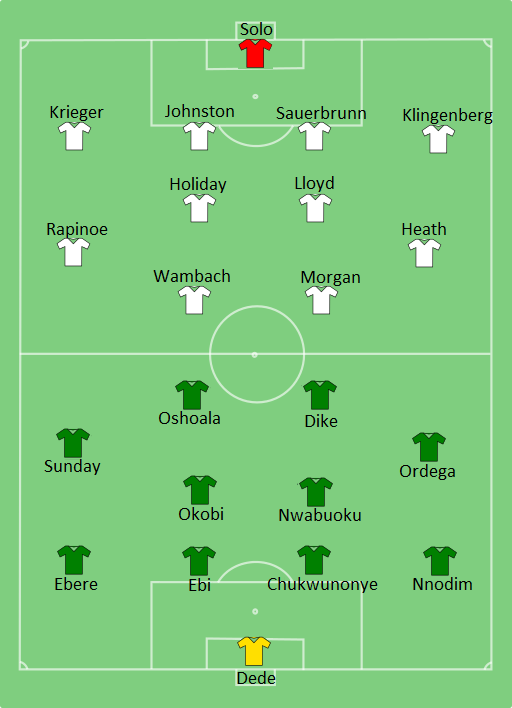

GK	1	Hope Solo
RB	11	Ali Krieger
CB	19	Julie Johnston
CB	4	Becky Sauerbrunn
LB	22	Meghan Klingenberg
CM	12	Lauren Holiday
CM	10	Carli Lloyd
RW	15	Megan Rapinoe	(substituted off) 74'
LW	17	Tobin Heath	(substituted off) 80'
CF	20	Abby Wambach (c)
CF	13	Alex Morgan	(substituted off) 66'
Substitutions:
FW	2	Sydney Leroux	(substituted in) 66'
MF	7	Shannon Boxx	(substituted in) 74'
DF	3	Christie Rampone	(substituted in) 80'
Manager:
Jill Ellis

Player of the Match:
Julie Johnston (United States)

Assistant referees:
Nataliya Rachynska (Ukraine)
Sanja Rođak-Karšić (Croatia)
Fourth official:
Rita Gani (Malaysia)
Fifth official:
Widiya Shamsuri (Malaysia)

=== Australia vs Sweden ===
16 June 2015
18:00 MDT (UTC−6)

Australia	1–1	Sweden
De Vanna 5'	Report	Jakobsson 15'

Commonwealth Stadium, Edmonton
Attendance: 10,177
Referee: Lucila Venegas (Mexico)

Australia	Sweden

GK	1	Lydia Williams
CB	5	Laura Alleway
CB	14	Alanna Kennedy
CB	7	Stephanie Catley
DM	8	Elise Kellond-Knight
CM	10	Emily van Egmond
CM	19	Katrina Gorry	(substituted off) 85'
RW	17	Kyah Simon	(substituted off) 72'
LW	9	Caitlin Foord
CF	11	Lisa De Vanna (c)	(substituted off) 63'
CF	20	Samantha Kerr
Substitutions:
FW	2	Larissa Crummer	(substituted in) 63'
FW	23	Michelle Heyman	(substituted in) 72'
MF	13	Tameka Butt	(substituted in) 85'
Manager:
Alen Stajcic

GK	1	Hedvig Lindahl
RB	23	Elin Rubensson	(substituted off) 76'
CB	14	Amanda Ilestedt
CB	5	Nilla Fischer
LB	18	Jessica Samuelsson
CM	7	Lisa Dahlkvist
CM	17	Caroline Seger
RW	10	Sofia Jakobsson
LW	16	Lina Nilsson	(substituted off) 74'
CF	15	Therese Sjögran
CF	8	Lotta Schelin (c)
Substitutions:
FW	9	Kosovare Asllani	(substituted in) 74'
DF	6	Sara Thunebro	(substituted in) 76'
Manager:
Pia Sundhage

Player of the Match:
Elise Kellond-Knight (Australia)

Assistant referees:
Mayte Chávez (Mexico)
Enedina Caudillo (Mexico)
Fourth official:
Tupou Patia (Cook Islands)
Fifth official:
Janette Arcanjo (Brazil)

== See also ==
- Australia at the FIFA Women's World Cup
- Nigeria at the FIFA Women's World Cup
- Sweden at the FIFA Women's World Cup
- United States at the FIFA Women's World Cup
