= Women's association football in Africa =

Overview of women's football in the African continent

Women's football in Africa
- Governing body: Confederation of African Football

International competitions
- Olympics; FIFA Women's World Cup(National Team); Africa Women Cup of Nations(National Team)

Women's football in Africa can be divided into distinct historical periods. Football is one of several sports played by women in Africa with the sport facing several challenges during development. Initially seen as a male participant sport, women have long held leadership and support roles within football in Africa.

== History ==
Peter Alegi, has identified distinct time periods with the development of Women's football in Africa including, "emergence and development (1970s–1980s), growth and transition (1990s), and institutionalization (2000–present)." During the 1960s and 1970s, male football administrators across Africa were largely uninterested in supporting the development women's football teams. Prior to the 1960s, women's role in sports revolved around support for their male players, both on the field and at home. Although in Nigeria women teams were playing during the 1940s with the matches being reported in the national newspaper Nigerian Spokesman. These games featured women playing in shorts and were attended by a number of spectators. In South Africa in the 1960s, women several tried to create women's football clubs including Jessie Maseko who tried to create a girls high school football club in 1962. In Cape Town a high school team called the Mother City Girls was created and played against boys' clubs. Women set up teams without the help or support of the Nigerian Football Association. By the 1970s, regular matches were being played by women in Senegal and South Africa. During the late 1970s, the national football federation started to set up women's league across the country.

In South Africa, white women were allowed to play football in the 1960s because of apartheid. Despite their race, those women still managed to grow women's involvement in the sport, subverting many gender expectations. Social scientist Cynthia Pelak quotes in Peter Alegi's African Soccerscapes that "South African women of European ancestry challenged gender expectations and forged new opportunities and identities in soccer." African women were prohibited from participating, often taking up roles in different teams' fan clubs. This led to the formation of the South African Women's Football Association (SAWFA). Very few African female players were able to play on teams, as the South African government wanted a chance to reenter international sports. South African women's involvement in football grew dramatically after the end of apartheid in the 1990s. Black women became the majority of players, switching roles with white players, who were now in very few supply in the country.

As Peter Alegi states in his book African Soccerscapes, "The boom in women's soccer around the world in the 1990s and 2000s fueled the creation of women's leagues and clubs and the further strengthening of the game in Africa."

== Popularity ==
Football has had to compete with a number of sports that are more popular with women across the continent, including track and field, netball, basketball, team handball and other sports. The masculine nature of football has proved a deterrent to women's involvement in football in Africa.

== Behind the scenes ==
While women were not always playing the game, they supported Footballs development by the 1920s women took on support roles that freed up time and resources which allowed men to actively participate. During the 1960s in South Africa, women began to emerge as leaders in the sport, taking on leadership positions in fan clubs.

== Fans ==
Single women were attending games by the 1960s.

== National teams ==
Before 1985 across the globe very few countries had a national women's football team. In Africa, this was true with for many countries including Burundi and Madagascar with their senior national sides having yet to play a FIFA sanctioned match.

== See also ==
- Football in Africa
