= Ugo Njoku =

Nigerian footballer

Personal information
- Full name: Ugo Njoku
- Date of birth: 27 November 1994 (age 31)
- Place of birth: Nigeria
- Height: 1.72 m (5 ft 8 in)
- Position: Defender

Team information
- Current team: Rivers Angels
- Number: 16

Senior career*
Years	Team	Apps	(Gls)
2013–2017	Rivers Angels		
2018–????	Croix Savoie Ambilly		
????-	Rivers Angels		

International career^{‡}
2014–2015	Nigeria	7	(0)
- * Club domestic league appearances and goals ‡ National team caps and goals as of 18:22, 17 June 2015 (UTC)

Ugo Njoku (born 27 November 1994, in Nigeria) is a Nigerian footballer who plays defender for Rivers Angels in the Nigerian Women's Championship.

== International career ==
Ugo Njoku played for Rivers Angels in the Nigerian Women's Championship from 2013 to 2017, before moving to Croix Savoie Ambilly.

Njoku had her first international action in 2014 while playing for Nigeria in the 2014 FIFA U-20 Women's World Cup match against Namibia. She was also part of the winning squad at the 2014 African Women's Championship. In May 2015 Njoku was called up to play for team Nigeria in the 2015 FIFA Women's World Cup.

During the 2015 FIFA Women's World Cup Group Match vs Australia Njoku elbowed Australian player Sam Kerr in the face. Njoku's action was described as one of the most violent acts seen in a women's football match. Njoku was suspended for three competitive games by the disciplinary panel, in effect ruling her out for the remainder of the tournament.

== Honours ==
=== International ===
Nigeria

- African Women's Championship (2): 2014, 2016
