= Bernadettar Kwimbira =

Malawian female referee

Personal information
- Full name: Bernadettar Asimenye Kwimbira-Mzika
- Date of birth: 11 September 1981 (age 44)
- Place of birth: Blantyre, Malawi

Bernadettar Asimenye Kwimbira Mzika (born 11 September 1981), also known as Bernadette Kwimbira, is a Malawian football referee.

== Life ==
Kwimbira has been on the FIFA list of referees since 2008 and is involved in officiating international matches. She was the first Malawian female referee to officiate at both the 2016 Olympic Games and as an assistant referee at the 2015 FIFA Women's World Cup in Canada. She has also officiated at events including the 2019 FIFA Women's World Cup in France, the 2016 Olympics football tournament in Rio de Janeiro, the 2017 Algarve Cup, the 2018 U-20 World Cup in France and the 2020 Olympic football tournament in Tokyo.

== Career ==
Bernadettar Kwimbira began her career as an assistant football referee in 2000, after joining the Malawi Defence Force (MDF) as one of their first female soldiers. During her time in the military, she remained an active athlete, attending football matches at the Civo Stadium, the Silver Stadium or the Nankhaka Ground in Lilongwe at weekends. In 2002, she expressed her ambitions to former FIFA referee Youngson Chilinda, and shortly thereafter completed the Football Association of Malawi refereeing course in Kasungu, earning a Grade 3 certificate.

Prior to this, Kwimbira attended Chichiri Secondary School where she competed in 100 and 200 metre races and was a member of the school's netball team. She subsequently pursued a two-year course in secretarial and administration in Mpemba's Staff Development Institute.
