= Josephine Chukwunonye =

Nigerian footballer

Personal information
- Full name: Josephine Chiwendu Chukwunonye
- Date of birth: 19 March 1992 (age 34)
- Place of birth: Nigeria
- Height: 1.73 m (5 ft 8 in)
- Position: Defender

Senior career*
Years	Team	Apps	(Gls)
2008–2015	Rivers Angels		
2015	Washington Spirit	2	(0)
2016	Vittsjö GIK	10	(1)
2018	Asarums IF	19	(1)
2019	Kungsbacka	7	(0)

International career^{‡}
2012	Nigeria U20	6	(0)
2011–2019	Nigeria	25	(0)
- * Club domestic league appearances and goals as of 16 July 2018 ‡ National team caps and goals as of 17 June 2015

Josephine Chiwendu Chukwunonye (born 19 March 1992) is a Nigerian professional footballer who plays as a defender. She has previously played for Nigerian domestic side Rivers Angels for seven years, and for Washington Spirit in the National Women's Soccer League.

== Club career ==
After seven years playing for Rivers Angels in the Nigerian Women's Championship, in June 2015 it was announced Chukwunonye was joining the National Women's Soccer League side Washington Spirit. She was signed at the same time as Australian international Hayley Raso, with the announcement coming the day before the Nigeria women's national football team played Australia in the 2015 FIFA Women's World Cup. Chukwunonye said at the time, "I am excited to join the Washington Spirit family; it's a thing of joy and a dream come true for me, I love playing with great players like Crystal Dunn, who I faced in the U20 World Cup in 2012. I am excited to work with coach Parsons because I know he will bring out the best in me." Chukwunonye was the second Nigerian international in the squad, joining Francisca Ordega. After playing two games for the team, she was released in December 2015.

In March 2016, both Chukwynonye and fellow Nigerian international Ngozi Okobi were signed by Swedish side Vittsjö GIK. They had previously played together at the Washington Spirit, and on their move to Vittsjö GIK, they joined two other Nigerian internationals there, Nkem Ezurike and Ifeoma Dieke. Chukwynonye said "I am excited to join the Vittsjo family; it's a thing of joy and a dream come true for me, I am eager to prove myself and give my very best to propel the club to glory".

== International career ==
Chukwunonye has represented Nigeria on junior levels at the 2008 FIFA U-17 Women's World Cup and 2012 FIFA U-20 Women's World Cup. At senior level she was part of Nigeria's squads in the FIFA Women's World Cup tournaments of 2011 and 2015 as well as the African Women's Championship in the 2010, 2012 and 2014 editions, winning the tournament three times (2010 and 2014), and the 2018 Africa women's championship.)

== Honours ==
=== International ===
Nigeria

- African Women's Championship (2): 2010, 2014

=== Club ===
Rivers Angels

- Nigerian Women's Championship (1): 2010
- Nigerian Women's Cup (5): 2010, 2011, 2012, 2013, 2014
