= Souad Oulhaj =

Moroccan football referee

- Full name: Souad Oulhaj
- Born: 12 June 1974 (age 52); Morocco

Domestic
Years	League	Role

International
Years	League	Role
2005–	FIFA-listed	Referee

Souad Oulhaj (Arabic: سعاد أولحاج, born June 12, 1974) is a Moroccan football referee.

She officiated in her first international match in 2005, before going on to participate in the 2005 Algarve Cup, 2006 Women's African Football Championship and the 2006 FIFA U-20 Women's World Championship in Russia.

Oulhaj was selected as one of the 36 match officials for the 2007 FIFA Women's World Cup in China.
