= Ngozi Okobi-Okeoghene =

Nigerian footballer (born 1993)

Ngozzi Okobi-Okeoghene
- Okeoghene kicking the ball in a game with the Nigerian national team.

Personal information
- Full name: Ngozi Sonia Okobi-Okeoghene
- Birth name: Ngozi Sonia Okobi
- Date of birth: 14 December 1993 (age 32)
- Place of birth: Nigeria
- Height: 1.65 m (5 ft 5 in)
- Position: Forward

Team information
- Current team: Ottawa Rapid
- Number: 13

Senior career*
| Years | Team | Apps | (Gls) |
| 2010–2015 | Delta Queens | | |
| 2015 | Washington Spirit | 4 | (0) |
| 2016–2017 | Vittsjö GIK | 38 | (3) |
| 2018–2023 | Eskilstuna United | 107 | (11) |
| 2023 | Levante Las Planas | 10 | (0) |
| 2025– | Ottawa Rapid | 17 | (2) |

International career^{‡}
| 2010 | Nigeria U17 | 4 | (5) |
| 2012 | Nigeria U20 | 6 | (1) |
| 2010– | Nigeria | 27 | (4) |
- * Club domestic league appearances and goals as of 30 October 2026 ‡ National team caps and goals as of 23 January 2025

Ngozi Sonia Okobi-Okeoghene (née Okobi; born 14 December 1993) is a Nigerian professional footballer who plays as a forward for Canadian club Ottawa Rapid and the Nigeria women's national team.

== Club career ==
On 23 June 2015, Washington Spirit announced a deal (in principle) for the attacker from her home-town club, Delta Queens of the Nigerian Women's Championship for an undisclosed fee; this made her the third Nigerian to move to the National Women's Soccer League club in 2015 behind attacker Francisca Ordega and the second in the World Cup behind defender, Josephine Chukwunonye.

On 6 January 2016, the Washington Spirit waived Okobi.

In February 2023, Okobi joined Spanish Liga F club Levante Las Planas.

On 23 January 2025, Okobi signed with Canadian side Ottawa Rapid FC in the newly-launched Northern Super League.

== International career ==
Ngozi played the 2008 FIFA U-17 Women's World Cup, 2010 FIFA U-17 Women's World Cup and 2012 FIFA U-20 Women's World Cup with the Falconets (nickname of the younger Nigeria women's national football teams).

At senior level (nicknamed Super Falcons) she was part of the squads at the African Women's Championship tournaments of 2010, 2012 and 2014, winning two of them (2010 and 2014). She also played for Nigeria at the 2015 FIFA Women's World Cup.

Ngozi Okobi has played for the Nigerian team albeit the under 17 squad since 2008 and got her first senior call up immediately after the U-17 tournament in 2010. The forward registered her first international goal against Zambia where she aided Nigeria trounce the hosts 6–0 at the 2014 African Women's Championship.

== Style of play ==
Okobi-Okeoghene primarily plays in the number 10 role as an attacking midfielder, but has also been deployed in other positions including winger and right wing-back.

== Honours ==
Nigeria

- African Women's Championship (4): 2010, 2014, 2016, 2018

Individual

- IFFHS CAF Women's Team of the Decade: 2011–2020
