= Evelyn Nwabuoku =

Nigerian footballer

Personal information
- Full name: Evelyn Chiedu Nwabuoku
- Date of birth: 14 November 1985 (age 40)
- Place of birth: Lagos, Nigeria
- Height: 1.67 m (5 ft 5 1/2 in)
- Position: Midfielder

Senior career*
Years	Team	Apps	(Gls)
- Bayelsa Queens
??–2015	Rivers Angels		
2015	BIIK Kazygurt		
2016	Östersunds DFF		
2016	Guingamp	4	(0)
2017-2020	Rivers Angels		
2020-2021	CD Pozoalbense	16	(0)
2021-2022	Rivers Angels		
2022-2023	Spezia		

International career^{‡}
2015-2019	Nigeria	42	(3)
- * Club domestic league appearances and goals ‡ National team caps and goals as of 18:19, 17 June 2015 (UTC)

Evelyn Nwabuoku (born 14 November 1985) is a Nigerian footballer who plays as a midfielder. She is the captain of the national side. Nwabuoku played previously for BIIK Kazygurt in the Kazakhstani women's football championship and for Bayelsa Queens and Rivers Angels in the Nigerian Women's Championship.

== Club career ==
Nwabuoku played in the Nigerian Women's Championship for Bayelsa Queens and Rivers Angels before moving to BIIK Kazygurt of the Kazakhstani women's football championship in 2015. She subsequently moved to French side En Avant de Guingamp, where she joined up with her sister, and fellow Nigerian international Desire Oparanozie. She helped Nwabuoku with the initial language difficulties and to settle in the area. Nwabuoku made her debut in the victory against league favourites FCF Juvisy, and praised the atmosphere in the Fred-Aubert Stadium.

== International career ==
She captained the Nigeria women's national football team, nicknamed the "Super Falcons", at the 2015 FIFA Women's World Cup and the 2014 African Women's Championship winning the latter. Nwabuoku said that becoming the captain was "amazing", and that "There is nothing as great as representing and defending the pride of your country." However, she added that the team had underperformed in the previous few years and were looking to improve at the 2017 Africa Cup of Nations. She was also part of the squad at the 2012 African Women's Championship.

== Honours ==
=== Club ===
Rivers Angels

- Nigerian Women's Championship: 2014
- Nigerian Women's Cup: 2014

=== International ===
Nigeria

- African Women's Championship: 2014
