= Ysis Sonkeng =

Cameroonian footballer

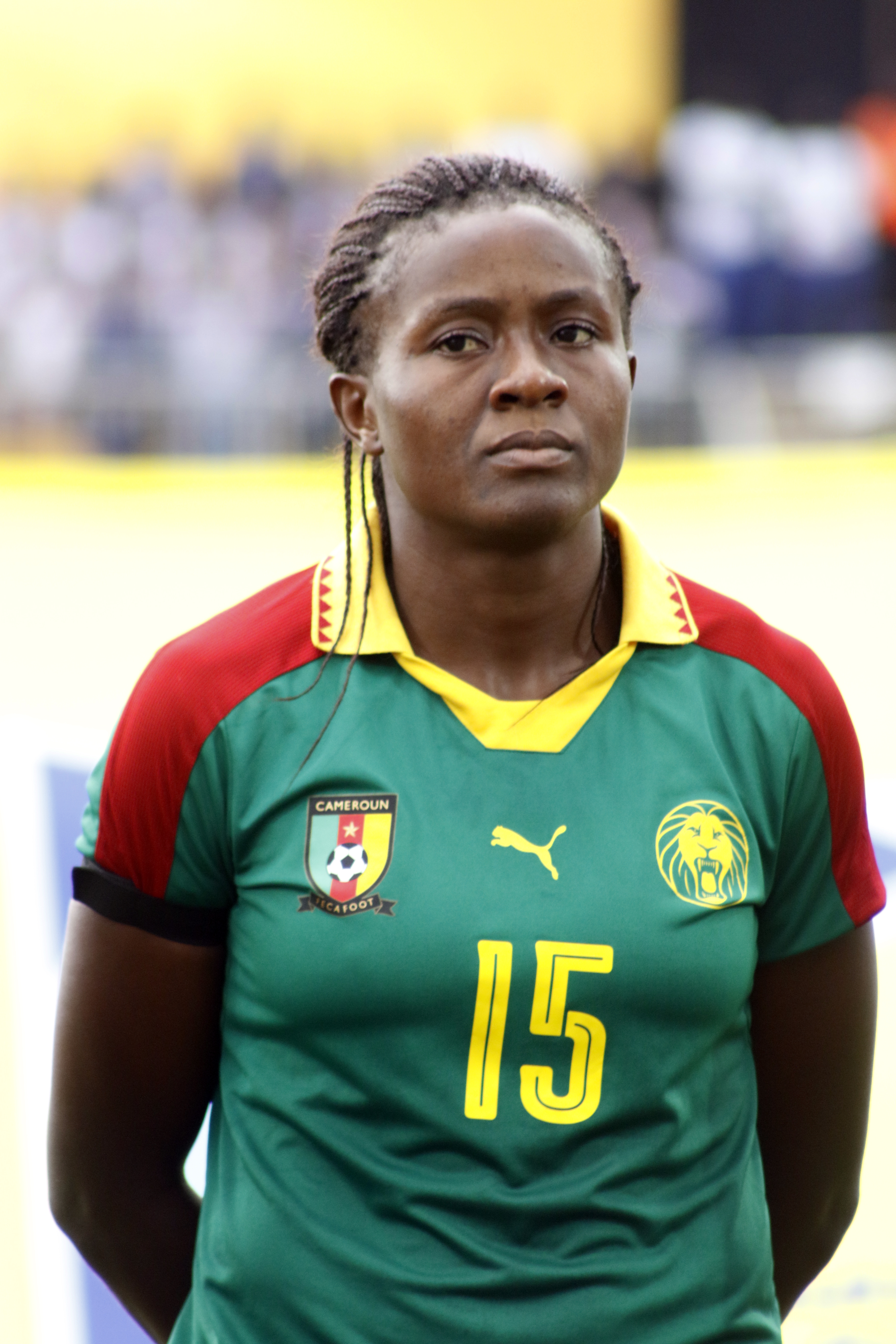
- Ysis Sonkeng in 2016

Personal information
- Full name: Ysis Amariele Sonkeng
- Date of birth: September 20, 1989 (age 37)
- Place of birth: Cameroon
- Height: 1.65 m (5 ft 5 in)
- Position: Defender

Senior career*
Years	Team	Apps	(Gls)
2020	Bnot Netanya	3	(0)
2021–2024	Kryvbas Kryvyi Rih	31	(7)
2024–2026	SeaSters	38	(4)

International career
2010–	Cameroon		
- * Club domestic league appearances and goals

Ysis Amariele Sonkeng (born September 20, 1989, Baleveng) is a Cameroonian women's football player, who plays for the Cameroon women's national football team. She plays as a defender and played in the 2012 Summer Olympics. She was known for scoring an own goal against New Zealand.
