= Women's Africa Cup of Nations =

Biennial international women's football tournament in Africa

Women’s Africa Cup of Nations
- Organiser(s): CAF
- Founded: 1998; 28 years ago
- Region: Africa
- Teams: 16 (finals) (from 2026)
- Current champions: Cameroon (1st title)
- Most championships: Nigeria (10 titles)
- Website: Official website
- 2026 Women's Africa Cup of Nations

The Women's Africa Cup of Nations (WAFCON), known for sponsorship purposes as the TotalEnergies Women's Africa Cup of Nations and formerly the African Women's Championship, is a biennial international women's football tournament organised by the Confederation of African Football (CAF) since 1998 as the qualification for the FIFA Women's World Cup for African nations. Initially started as a home-and-away qualification competition, it got renamed as a biennial tournament in 1998 and took on its current name as of the 2016 edition.

Nigeria is the most successful nation in the history of the tournament since it became full-scale in 1998, winning 10 titles so far. Equatorial Guinea won as hosts of the 2008 and 2012 editions. South Africa won the 2022 edition to become the third African nation to ever win the tournament. Cameroon won the 2026 edition to become the fourth African nation to ever win the tournament. Morocco, Ghana and Malawi are the only nations outside of the previous winners to have also made it to the tournament's final. Cameroon is the current champion, having won the 2026 final.

== History ==
=== 1990s: Origin and early years ===
In 1991, FIFA organized the inaugural World Cup tournament for women after multiple trials dating back to 1974, causing CAF to organize a qualification competition on a home-and-away basis for its nations. For its first 2 editions in 1991 and 1995, multiple nations withdrew their teams from qualification or its matches, as they were not ready for the new developments at the time. CAF, under then-president Issa Hayatou, decided to rechristen the competition as a biennial tournament by installing an 8-team group stage and a knockout stage, creating the traditional tournament structure that would last until 2015.

=== 1991-2006: Nigerian domination ===
While 1991 was the first year of the tournament Congo, Senegal, Zambia and Zimbabwe all withdrew which led to the tournament only consisting of six matches. The tournament was played at locations across Africa, with no host nation. Nigeria defeated Cameroon, who had received two walkovers, in the final of the inaugural tournament in 1991 to win the first title. The victory earned Nigeria qualification to the 1991 FIFA Women's World Cup. Similarly in the 1995 edition Ghana and Angola withdrew, which left the tournament with only six nations. Nigeria claimed their second tournament win by defeating South Africa by an aggregate score of 11–2 over two legs.

The 1998 edition was hosted from 17 to 31 October by Nigeria, who would claim their third consecutive win by defeating Ghana 2–0 in the final at Gateway Stadium. This was the first edition that featured a qualification round with Nigeria qualifying automatically as hosts, with the remaining seven spots determined by a qualification round, and a play-off round. From then on, the tournament would continue to take place biennially, with the 2000 edition being hosted in South Africa. Nigeria won their fourth title by beating South Africa 2–0 in the final in what was the only final in the tournaments history that was never completed. The match was abandoned at the 73rd minute due to fans throwing objects at the referee following Stella Mbachu's second goal.

Nigeria returned to hosting duties in 2002 which saw them beat Ghana 2–0 in the final to take their fifth consecutive title. They would also lift the trophy in the following two tournaments in 2004 and 2006, defeating Cameroon, and Ghana, in respective finals.

The 2008 edition of the tournament was hosted by Equatorial Guinea between 15 and 29 November. The tournament marked the competition debuts of Congo and Tunisia and was the first final that did not feature seven-time winner Nigeria. The final was held at the Estadio Internacional stadium, where hosts Equatorial Guinea defeated South Africa 2–1 to be the first nation beyond Nigeria to win the tournament. Nigeria would again lift the trophy in 2010 after defeating Equatorial Guinea 4–2 in the final, although Equatorial Guinea would again lift the trophy two years later in the 2012 edition by defeating South Africa 2–1 in the final, marking their second tournament win.

The eleventh edition of the tournament in 2014 saw Nigeria pick up their ninth title as they beat Cameroon 2–0 in the final. Namibia was granted hosting duties for the tournament and thus made their debut in the final tournament. Namibia faced criticism in their hosting of the tournament because the national Namibia Women's Super League was suspended due to a lack of financial availability upon hosting the African Women's Championship. Also for the first time, the defending champions of the tournament, Equatorial Guinea, were not taking part after failing to win their last qualifying round match after they were defeated by Ivory Coast.

=== African Women Cup of Nations ===
On 6 August 2015, the CAF Executive Committee decided to change the tournament's name to the Africa Women Cup of Nations, similar to the male Africa Cup of Nations; however the name on the tournament logo for the forthcoming edition following the announcement would read as the Women's Africa Cup of Nations. The 2016 Women's Africa Cup of Nations was hosted by Cameroon and was delayed to between 19 November and 3 December 2016 due to weather considerations. Nigeria won their tenth championship as they defeated Cameroon 1–0 with a late goal in the final.

On 21 July 2016, French energy and petroleum giant TotalEnergies (formerly Total S.A.) secured an 8-year sponsorship package from CAF to support its competitions.

=== New Format and Winners ===
Nigeria won the Women African Cup of Nations 2018, achieving a 4-3 penalty shootout victory against South Africa in the final. The title was Nigeria's third consecutive and eleventh overall Africa Women Cup of Nations title and cemented their place in the 2019 FIFA Women's World Cup, where they would subsequently reach the round of sixteen. Cameroon came third after beating Mali 4–2 in their third-place decider match. The prize money awarded to Nigeria for winning the 2018 Africa Cup of Nations amounted to $200,000.

The 2020 edition was cancelled due to the COVID-19 pandemic in Africa and its impact. The cancellation of the Women's tournament, opposed to the Men's rendition being postponed is accredited to the worsening impact of the pandemic along with no new host nation coming forward, after Congo withdrew from hosting duties the previous year.

=== Tournament expansion ===
In 2021, the president of CAF, Patrice Motsepe announced the CAF 2021-2025 Action Plan, in a speech during the 44th Ordinary General Assembly, in Tanzania. Motsepe deemed the plan as “a commitment to the women who play the game, to the young girls who dream of a football career, and to all those who invest in the promotion and advancement of African Women’s football.”

The 2022 edition of the tournament was the first edition with 12 teams, with there previously only being 8 teams who took part in the competition. It also went down in history as the edition which broke the attendance and audience records, with the semi-final clash between Morocco and Nigeria gaining 45,562 spectators in attendance at the Prince Moulay Abdellah Stadium on July 18, 2022. It was the first of the editions to be played in North Africa, with Morocco taking up hosting duties, which saw games played across three venues in Rabat and Casablanca from 2–23 July. Semi-finalists Zambia and Nigeria joined the finalists Morocco and South Africa in earning automatic qualification for the 2023 FIFA World Cup, making Morocco the first country from North Africa and the Arab world to qualify for the 2023 FIFA Women's World Cup. South Africa won the tournament for the first time after beating host nation Morocco 2–1 in the final, which itself marked the first final in the history of the competition to feature neither the nine-time winners and defending champions Nigeria, nor two-time host-nation winners Equatorial Guinea.

On 3 July 2025, the Confederation of African Football (CAF) announced a major increase in prize money for the 2024 Women's Africa Cup of Nations (WAFCON), set to take place in Morocco. The entire prize pool has increased by 45% to US$3,475,000, while the winner's award has been doubled to US$1,000,000. In order to improve player, coach, and staff pay and support the increasing international recognition of women's football on the continent, CAF president Patrice Motsepe emphasised that this decision represents CAF's continued commitment to the growth of women's football in Africa.

== Format ==
The inaugural editions in 1991 and 1995 were purely home-and-away qualification matches as both CAF and African nations were adapting to the new developments from FIFA and that only one qualification spot for the FIFA Women's World Cup was available to African teams. The format continued with the installation of a full-scale tournament consisting of an initial eight-team group stage in the 1998 edition and an additional qualification spot. This stood until the 2016 edition when it was established that, henceforth, the finalists from every edition of the tournament would qualify for the FIFA Women's World Cup and the losing semi-finalists qualify for the play-offs to compete with the losing semi-finalists from the AFC qualification tournament for 2 spare spots at the international tournament. During an executive committee meeting ahead of the final of the 2019 U-23 Africa Cup of Nations, CAF approved an expansion of the group stage to 12 teams or 3 groups of 4 teams.

At the onset of the competition, the defending champion qualifies automatically for the following edition of the tournament and since the 1998 edition, the appointed hosts nation of an edition of the tournament automatically qualifies.

=== Main tournament ===
Between 1998 and 2018, the 8 qualified teams were drawn into two groups of 4 with each team playing the other once. The top two advance to the knockout stage and earn qualification to the FIFA Women's World Cup every other edition.

Since the 2022 edition, the 12 qualified teams are drawn into three groups of four teams each with the same format as in previous editions, but with an inclusion of the quarter-finals in the knockout stage. The top two teams and two of the best third-placed teams advanced to the knockout stage. The winners of the quarter-finals advance to the semi-finals and earn qualification to the FIFA Women's World Cup whiles the losers of the quarter-finals compete with the losers of the quarter-finals of the AFC qualification tournament for the remaining two available spots for the World Cup (commonly referred to by CAF as the "Repechage" stage).

== Trophy and medals ==
Throughout the history of the Women's Africa Cup of Nations, three trophies have been awarded to the winners of the competition; the current trophy was first awarded in the 2024 edition.

On 2 July 2025, to mark the expansion and acceptance of women's football in Africa, CAF unveiled a new trophy for the 2024 TotalEnergies CAF Women's Africa Cup of Nations. The design, which was influenced by the men's AFCON trophy, has a golden football in the middle of a blossoming flower with petals that symbolise each team. The trophy, which was given out in Casablanca, symbolises CAF's dedication to empowerment, equality, and the growth of African women's football internationally.

== Results ==
=== African Women's Championship World Cup Qualifying ===
Edition	Year	Host nation	Final			Third Place		Teams
Edition	Year	Host nation	Qualified team	Score	Second Place	Third Place		Teams
1	1991	Home sites	Nigeria	6–0 (agg.)	Cameroon	Guinea	Zambia	4
2	1995	Home sites	Nigeria	11–2 (agg.)	South Africa	Angola	Ghana	6

=== Women's Africa Cup of Nations ===
Edition	Year	Host nation	Final			Third place match			Teams
Edition	Year	Host nation	Winner	Score	Second place	Third place match			Teams
			African Women's Championship						
1	1998	Nigeria	Nigeria	2–0	Ghana	DR Congo	3–3 (a.e.t.) (3–1 p)	Cameroon	7
2	2000	South Africa	Nigeria	2–0 (abd)	South Africa	Ghana	6–3	Zimbabwe	8
3	2002	Nigeria	Nigeria	2–0	Ghana	Cameroon	3–0	South Africa	8
4	2004	South Africa	Nigeria	5–0	Cameroon	Ghana	0–0 (a.e.t.) (6–5 p)	Ethiopia	8
5	2006	Nigeria	Nigeria	1–0	Ghana	South Africa	2–2 (5–4 p)	Cameroon	8
6	2008	Equatorial Guinea	Equatorial Guinea	2–1	South Africa	Nigeria	1–1 (5–4 p)	Cameroon	8
7	2010	South Africa	Nigeria	4–2	Equatorial Guinea	South Africa	2–0	Cameroon	8
8	2012	Equatorial Guinea	Equatorial Guinea	4–0	South Africa	Cameroon	1–0	Nigeria	8
9	2014	Namibia	Nigeria	2–0	Cameroon	Ivory Coast	1–0	South Africa	8
			Women's Africa Cup of Nations						
10	2016	Cameroon	Nigeria	1–0	Cameroon	Ghana	1–0	South Africa	8
11	2018	Ghana	Nigeria	0–0 (a.e.t.) (4–3 p)	South Africa	Cameroon	4–2	Mali	8
-	2020		Cancelled due to the COVID-19 pandemic in Africa and its impact on CAF.						
12	2022	Morocco	South Africa	2–1	Morocco	Zambia	1–0	Nigeria	12
13	2024	Morocco	Nigeria	3–2	Morocco	Ghana	1–1 (4–3 p)	South Africa	12
14	2026	Morocco	Cameroon	3–0	Malawi	Algeria	1–1 (3–2 p)	Morocco	16

Note: abd – match abandoned in the 73rd minute

== Summary ==
Team	Title(s)	Runners-up	Third place	Fourth place
Nigeria	10 (1998*, 2000*, 2002, 2004, 2006*, 2010, 2014, 2016, 2018, 2024)	—	1 (2008)	2 (2012, 2022)
Equatorial Guinea	2 (2008*, 2012*)	1 (2010)	—	—
South Africa	1 (2022)	4 (2000*, 2008, 2012, 2018)	2 (2006, 2010*)	4 (2002, 2014, 2016, 2024)
Cameroon	1 2026	3 (2004, 2014, 2016*)	3 (2002, 2012, 2018)	4 (1998, 2006, 2008, 2010)
Ghana	—	3 (1998, 2002, 2006)	4 (2000, 2004, 2016, 2024)	—
Morocco	—	2 (2022*, 2024*)	—	1 (2026*)
Malawi	—	1 (2026)	—	—
DR Congo	—	—	1 (1998)	—
Ivory Coast	—	—	1 (2014)	—
Zambia	—	—	1 (2022)	—
Algeria	—	—	1 (2026)	—
Zimbabwe	—	—	—	1 (2000)
Ethiopia	—	—	—	1 (2004)
Mali	—	—	—	1 (2018)

* hosts
** losing semi-finals

=== Performances by regions ===
Regional Federation	Performances			
Regional Federation	Winners	Runners-up	Third	Fourth
WAFU (West Africa)	10 times: Nigeria (10)	3 times: Ghana (3)	6 times: Ghana (4); Nigeria (1); Ivory Coast (1)	3 times: Nigeria (2); Mali (1)
UNIFFAC (Central Africa)	3 times: Equatorial Guinea (2); Cameroon (1)	4 times: Cameroon (3); Equatorial Guinea (1)	4 times: Cameroon (3); DR Congo (1)	4 times: Cameroon (4)
COSAFA (Southern Africa)	1 time: South Africa (1)	5 times: South Africa (4); Malawi (1)	3 times: South Africa (2); Zambia (1)	5 times: South Africa (4); Zimbabwe (1)
UNAF (North Africa)	—	2 times: Morocco (2)	1 time: Algeria (1)	1 time: Morocco (1)
CECAFA (East Africa)	—	—	—	1 time: Ethiopia (1)

== Records and statistics ==
=== Participating nations ===
Legend

- 1st – Champions
- 2nd – Runners-up
- 3rd – Third place
- 4th – Fourth place
- SF – Semi-finals
- QF – Quarter-finals
- GS – Group stage
- W – Winner and advance to World Cup
- Q – Qualified
- • – Did not qualify
- × – Did not enter
- × – Withdrew before qualification
- — Withdrew/Disqualified after qualification
- – Hosts

Team	1991	1995	(Nigeria) 1998	(South Africa) 2000	(Nigeria) 2002	(South Africa) 2004	(Nigeria) 2006	(Equatorial Guinea) 2008	(South Africa) 2010	(Equatorial Guinea) 2012	(Namibia) 2014	(Cameroon) 2016	(Ghana) 2018	(Morocco) 2022	(Morocco) 2024	(Morocco) 2026	Years
Algeria	×	×	×	•	×	GS	GS	•	GS	×	GS	•	GS	•	QF	3rd	7
Angola	×	SF	×	×	GS	×	•	×	•	×	×	×	×	•	•	•	2
Botswana	×	×	×	×	×	×	×	•	•	•	•	•	×	QF	GS	•	2
Burkina Faso	×	×	×	×	×	×	×	×	×	×	•	•	•	GS	•	GS	2
Burundi												×	×	GS	•	•	1
Cameroon	2nd	×	4th	GS	3rd	2nd	4th	4th	4th	3rd	2nd	2nd	3rd	QF	•	1st	14
Cape Verde														×	•	GS	1
Congo		×	×	×	×	•	•	GS	×	×	×	×	•	•	•	×	0
DR Congo	×	×	3rd	×	•	×	GS	•	•	GS	×	×	×	×	GS	•	4
Egypt	×	×	GS	•	×	×	•	×	×	•	•	GS	×	•	•	GS	3
Equatorial Guinea	×	×	×	×	•	•	GS	1st	2nd	1st	•	•	GS	•	•	•	5
Ethiopia	×	×	×	×	GS	4th	×	×	•	GS	•	•	•	•	•	•	3
Ghana	QF	SF	2nd	3rd	2nd	3rd	2nd	GS	GS	•	GS	3rd	GS	•	3rd	QF	14
Guinea	SF	×	•	×	×	•	•	•	•	•	×	•	×	•	•	•	1
Ivory Coast	×	×	×	×	•	×	•	•	•	GS	3rd	•	•	•	•	QF	3
Kenya	×	×	×	×	×	×	•	×	×	×	•	GS	•	•	•	GS	2
Malawi						•	•	×	×	•	×	×	×	•	×	2nd	1
Mali	×	×	×	×	GS	GS	GS	GS	GS	•	•	GS	4th	•	QF	GS	9
Morocco	×	×	GS	GS	•	×	•	•	•	•	•	•	•	2nd	2nd	4th	5
Mozambique	×	×		×	×	×	•	×	×	•	×	×	×	•	•	×	0
Namibia	×	×	×	×	×	×	•	•	•	•	GS	•	•	•	•	•	1
Nigeria	W	W	1st	1st	1st	1st	1st	3rd	1st	4th	1st	1st	1st	4th	1st	QF	16
Réunion	×	×	×	GS	×	×	×	×	×	×	×	×	×	×	×	×	1
Senegal		×	×	×	•	•	•	•	•	GS	•	•	•	QF	QF	GS	4
Sierra Leone	×	QF	×	×	×	×	×	×	•	×	×	×	×	•	×	•	1
South Africa	×	2nd	GS	2nd	4th	GS	3rd	2nd	3rd	2nd	4th	4th	2nd	1st	4th	QF	15
Tanzania	×	×	×	×	•	•	•	•	GS	•	•	•	•	•	GS	GS	3
Togo	×	×	×	×	×	×	•	×	×	×	×	×	×	GS	•	•	1
Tunisia	×	×	×	×	×	×	×	GS	•	•	•	•	×	QF	GS	•	3
Uganda	×	×	•	GS	•	×	×	×	×	•	×	×	•	GS	•	•	2
Zambia		QF	×	×	•	×	•	•	×	•	GS	•	GS	3rd	QF	GS	6
Zimbabwe		×	×	4th	GS	GS	×	•	×	•	•	GS	•	•	×	•	4
Total (31 teams)	4	6	7	8	8	8	8	8	8	8	8	8	8	12	12	16	

=== Debut of national teams ===
Year	Debuting teams		
Year	Teams	No.	Cum.
1998	Cameroon, DR Congo, Egypt, Ghana, Morocco, Nigeria, South Africa	7	7
2000	Réunion, Uganda, Zimbabwe	3	10
2002	Ethiopia, Mali	2	12
2004	Algeria	1	13
2006	Equatorial Guinea	1	14
2008	Congo, Tunisia	2	16
2010	Tanzania	1	17
2012	Ivory Coast, Senegal	2	19
2014	Namibia, Zambia	2	21
2016	Kenya	1	22
2018	None	0	22
2022	Botswana, Burkina Faso, Burundi, Togo	4	26
2024	None	0	26
2026	Cape Verde, Malawi	2	28

=== Most tournament editions hosted ===
Hosts	Nation	Year(s)
Thrice	Nigeria	1998, 2002, 2006
Thrice	South Africa	2000, 2004, 2010
Thrice	Morocco	2022, 2024, 2026
Twice	Equatorial Guinea	2008, 2012
Once	Namibia	2014
Once	Cameroon	2016
Once	Ghana	2018

== See also ==
- FIFA Women's World Cup
- CAF Women's Champions League
